= ES Gokin =

Toy line

- Type: SD Robot Die-Cast Figure
- Invented by: Action Toys
- Company: Action Toys, Art Storm
- Country: Hong Kong, Japan
- Availability: 2009–Present
- Materials: Plastic, Die-Cast Metal
- Official website

ES Gokin (ES合金) is a joint collaboration toy line produced/manufactured by Hong Kong Action Toys and licensing/distributed by Japanese toy company Art Storm. The line consists of SD (Super Deformed) Die-Cast robots which mainly focuses on mechas. It was first introduced and released in the year 2009. Though the line is in the SD family, Action Toys/Art Storm has made each robot (released so far) differ in size to make it look realistic. One of the selling points of the figures/robots is the articulation design. Despite it having limited mobility, they are still considered rather flexible enough to evoke some of the memorable moves and attacks seen in each of the robots' respective series. Each of these figure/robots come with a stand and some of them even have neat featuring gimmicks implemented in them. Though the ES Gokin are SD's, it is targeted to a mature demographic.

== Line-Up ==
Number	Figure	Series	Release date	Remarks
ES-01	Sengoku Majin GoShogun	GoShogun	2009.12	No gimmick
ES-02	Kotetsu Jeeg	Jeeg	2009.12	No gimmick
ES-03	Getter Robo 1	Getter Robo	2011.01	Its eyes can glow (Batteries not included)
ES-04	Getter Robo 2	Getter Robo	2011.02	Drill can spin (Batteries not included)
ES-05	Getter Robo 3	Getter Robo	2011.04	No gimmick
ES-06	Gowappa 5 Godam	Godam	2011.08	No gimmick
ES-07	Baikanfu	Machine Robo: Revenge of Cronos	2011.11	Baikanfu (only) eyes can glow (Batteries not included)
ES-08	VV-54 AR Mugen Calibur	Special Armored Battalion Dorvack	2012.04	Its eyes can glow (Batteries not included)
ES-09	Gaiking	Gaiking: Legend of Daiku-Maryu	2013.01	Can be combined with Raiking & Balking to form Gaiking the Great. First press release come with another Daiku-Maryu head with Gold plated pieces.
ES-10	Raiking & Balking	Gaiking: Legend of Daiku-Maryu	2013.02	Can be combined with Gaiking to form Gaiking the Great. Eyes can glow.
ES-11	Yusha Raideen	Brave Raideen	2013.07	No gimmick
ES-12	Mazinger Z	Mazinger Z	2014.06	Its eyes can glow (Batteries not included)
ES-13	Great Mazinger	Great Mazinger	2014.06	Its eyes can glow (Batteries not included)
ES-14	Roadbuster	Transformers	2014.06	Its eyes can glow (Batteries not included)
ES-15	Gordian	Gordian Warrior	2015.07	Its eyes can glow (Batteries not included)
ES-16	King Sccasher	NG Knight Lamune & 40	2015.01	The gold parts are done with chrome instead of paint.
ES-17	Shin Getter Robo 1	Getter Robo Armageddon	2016.01	Its eyes can glow (Batteries not included) and there is a switch where you can shift its eyes left till right.
ES-?	Shin Getter Robo 1 Black version	Getter Robo Armageddon	2016.06	Its eyes can glow (Batteries not included) and there is a switch where you can shift its eyes left till right.
ES-18	Choju Kishin Dancouga	Dancouga	2016.12	It can break up into the 4 animal fighters.
ES-?	Nyagou King	Kyatto Ninden Teyandee	2016.12	No gimmick
ES-?	Mazinger Z (East Toei version)	Mazinger Z	2016.12	Its eyes can glow (Batteries not included)
ES-?	Mazinger Z (True Mazinger Impact)	Mazinger Z	2016.12	Its eyes can glow (Batteries not included)
ES-19	UFO Robo Grendizer	UFO Robo Grendizer	2017.10	Its eyes can glow (Batteries not included)
ES-20	God Mars	Six God Combination Godmars	2019.06	Its eyes can glow (Batteries not included)
ES-21	Daltanious	Daltanious	2018.07	Its eyes can glow (Batteries not included)
ES-22	Mazinkaiser	Mazinkaiser	2019.02	Its eyes can glow (Batteries not included)
ES-23	Tetsujin 28	Tetsujin 28	2019.12	Its eyes can glow (Batteries not included)
ES-XX	Raijin-Oh	Matchless Raijin-Oh	2021.XX	Can separate and combine. Its eyes can glow (Batteries not included)
ES-25	Voltron	Beast King GoLion	2022.XX	Can separate and combine.
ES-26	Vehicle Voltron	Armored Fleet Dairugger XV	2022.XX	Can separate and combine.

=== Other Releases ===
Number	Figure	Series	Release date	Remarks
ES-PC01	Yattarou & Toritsukkun	Kyatto Ninden Teyandee	2013.03	No Gimmick
ESS-01	Pegasus Seiya	Saint Seiya	2013.12	Comes with a Saint Seiya Coin, Stand, & Effect Piece (x1)
ESS-02	Eagle Marin	Saint Seiya	2013.12	Comes with a Saint Seiya Coin, Stand, & Effect Piece (x1)
ESS-03	Dragon Shiryu	Saint Seiya	2014.02	Comes with a Saint Seiya Coin, Stand, & Effect Piece (x1)
ESS-04	Cygnus Hyoga	Saint Seiya	2014.02	Comes with a Saint Seiya Coin, Stand, & Effect Piece (x1)
ESS-05	Andromeda Shun	Saint Seiya	2014.05	Comes with a Saint Seiya Coin, Stand, & Effect Piece (x1)
ESS-06	Ophiuchus Shaina	Saint Seiya	2014.05	Comes with a Saint Seiya Coin, Stand, & Effect Piece (x1)
ESS-07	Phoenix Ikki	Saint Seiya	2014.06	Comes with a Saint Seiya Coin, Stand, & Effect Piece (x1)
ES-TB01	Tekkaman Blade	Tekkaman Blade	2014.01	Its eyes can glow (Batteries not included). Also it has very little Die-Cast in it.
ES-FX01	Tetsujin 28-Go FX	Tetsujin 28-go	2014.10	Its eyes can glow.
TF-01	Optimus Prime	Transformers	2015.01	Its eyes can glow (Batteries not included).
TF-02	Rodimus Prime	Transformers	20XX.XX	Yet to be announced

=== Special Releases ===
Number	Figure	Series	Release date	Remarks
ES-06D	Godam Dragon	Godam	2011.10	The Dragon can become an accessory parts for Series.06 Godam
ESS-M01	Pegasus Seiya (Gold Ver.)	Saint Seiya	2013.12	Hong Kong Mikiki Shopping Mall Special Version
Limited Edition	Saori Kido (Athena)	Saint Seiya	2014.XX	Limited release from toy event. Not sold outside
SP-01	Getter Robo (Repaint Ver.)	Getter Robo	2015.12	Hong Kong Toy Soul 2015 Event Exclusive Item. A repaint version of the previous release Getter 1-3 in one package. Come with Hanger for the Getter's.
SP-XX	Getter Robo (Repaint Ver.)	Getter Robo	2016.02	Release in Japan for a limited time. A repaint version of the previous release Getter 1-3 in one package. Come with Hanger for the Getter's.
DX-02	Mazinger Z	Mazinger Z	20XX.XX	
DX-03	Ougon Senshi Gold Lightan	Gold Lightan	2022.09	Gold pieces use 24 Gold Plating. Comes with extra LED head which the eyes will light up.
