= Gurren Lagann =

Japanese anime television series

- Key visual, featuring (foreground, left to right) Kamina, Simon (with Boota on his shoulder), Yoko Littner, and (background) the titular mecha, Gurren Lagann

天元突破グレンラガン (Tengen Toppa Guren Ragan)
- Genre: Adventure; Comedy drama; Mecha; Coming-of-age
- Created by: Gainax
- Anime television series
- Directed by: Hiroyuki Imaishi
- Produced by: Eiichi Kamagata; Norio Yamakawa; Naoki Sasada
- Written by: Kazuki Nakashima
- Music by: Taku Iwasaki
- Studio: Gainax
- Licensed by: AUS: Crunchyroll Store Australia (Note: Formerly known as Madman Anime.); NA: Aniplex of America; UK: Anime Limited
- Original network: TXN (TV Tokyo)
- English network: AU: C31; CA: Super Channel; NA: Neon Alley; SA: Animax; SEA: Animax Asia; UK: Viceland; US: Syfy, Adult Swim (Toonami)
- Original run: April 1, 2007 – September 30, 2007
- Episodes: 27
- Manga
- Written by: Kazuki Nakashima
- Illustrated by: Kotaro Mori
- Published by: ASCII Media Works
- English publisher: NA: Bandai Entertainment
- Magazine: Dengeki Comic Gao! (former); Dengeki Daioh
- Original run: June 2007 – July 2013
- Volumes: 10
- Light novel
- Written by: Kurasumi Sunayama
- Illustrated by: Hiroki Shinagawa
- Published by: Shogakukan
- Imprint: Gagaga Bunko
- Original run: August 17, 2007 – December 19, 2008
- Volumes: 4
- Video game
- Developer: Konami
- Publisher: Konami
- Platform: Nintendo DS
- Released: October 25, 2007
- Manga

Tengen Toppa Gurren Lagann: Gurren Gakuen-hen
- Written by: Ashi Zaitsu
- Illustrated by: Kabao Kikkawa
- Published by: Kadokawa Shoten
- Magazine: Comp Ace
- Original run: August 26, 2008 – January 26, 2009
- Volumes: 1
- Anime film

Gurren Lagann the Movie: Childhood's End
- Directed by: Hiroyuki Imaishi
- Studio: Gainax
- Licensed by: AUS: Crunchyroll Store Australia; NA: Aniplex of America
- Released: September 6, 2008
- Runtime: 112 minutes
- Anime film

Gurren Lagann the Movie: The Lights in the Sky Are Stars
- Directed by: Hiroyuki Imaishi
- Studio: Gainax
- Licensed by: AUS: Crunchyroll Store Australia; NA: Aniplex of America
- Released: April 25, 2009
- Runtime: 126 minutes

Gurren Lagann, known in Japan as Tengen Toppa Gurren Lagann (Japanese: 天元突破グレンラガン, Hepburn: Tengen Toppa Guren Ragan; lit. "Heaven-Piercing Gurren Lagann"), is a Japanese mecha anime television series animated by Gainax and produced by TV Tokyo, Konami Digital Entertainment, Dentsu and Aniplex. It ran for 27 episodes on TV Tokyo and its affiliates between April and September 2007. It was directed by Hiroyuki Imaishi with series composition by veteran playwright Kazuki Nakashima. Gurren Lagann takes place in a future where the Spiral King, Lordgenome, rules Earth and forces mankind to live in isolated subterranean villages. The plot focuses on two teenagers, Simon and Kamina, who live in a subterranean village and wish to go to the surface. Using a mecha known as Lagann, they reach the surface and start fighting alongside other humans against Lordgenome's forces before fighting the forces of their true enemy.

In North America, although initially announced to be licensed by ADV Films in 2007, the license was transferred to Bandai Entertainment in 2008 and then to Aniplex of America in 2013. In the United Kingdom, it was licensed by Manga Entertainment in 2007, then transferred to Beez Entertainment in 2008, and then to Anime Limited in 2013. The Sci Fi Channel acquired the broadcasting rights of Gurren Lagann and began airing it in July 2008, as part of Sci Fi's Ani-Monday anime block. A manga adaptation was published by ASCII Media Works between 2007 and 2013, which Bandai Entertainment licensed and released in English in North America. A series of four light novels was published by Shogakukan between 2007 and 2008. A Nintendo DS video game was released in October 2007, bundled with a special episode of the anime series. Two animated film versions were produced; the first premiered in Japanese theaters in September 2008, and the second premiered in April 2009.

Gurren Lagann has received several awards, including at the 7th Tokyo Anime Awards, the 12th Animation Kobe and the Excellence Prize at the 11th Japan Media Arts Festival. As of 2021, alongside Imaishi's other works during his time in Gainax, the rights to the series are owned by Studio Trigger, which was formed by Imaishi in 2011.

== Plot ==
=== Story ===
Gurren Lagann takes place in a future where the Spiral King, Lordgenome, rules Earth and forces mankind to live in isolated subterranean villages without contact with the surface world or other villages. The few humans who escape to the surface are constantly threatened by his Beastmen, humanoid creatures that serve as Lordgenome's army who pilot mechas. Each mecha is called a "Gunmen" and has a body that resembles a face.

Simon, a meek young digger conscripted to expand his home deeper underground, lives in Giha village with his best friend and older brother figure Kamina, an eccentric delinquent who dreams of visiting the surface world as his father did. One day, Simon unearths a drill-shaped key called a Core Drill, and then finds a small Gunmen. Soon after, a giant Gunmen crashes through the ceiling and begins attacking the village. It is pursued by a woman named Yoko. Simon uses his Core Drill to activate the smaller Gunmen (which Kamina names Lagann) and its drilling-based abilities. He successfully uses it to destroy the more prominent Gunmen and break through the ceiling, allowing him and Kamina to reach the surface world.

Along the way, Kamina hijacks a Gunmen and names it Gurren, combining it with Lagann to form the mecha Gurren Lagann. Their actions inspire other humans to steal their own Gunmen and join Team Gurren, leading Kamina to rename it Team Dai-Gurren. Eventually, Team Dai-Gurren captures an enemy Gunmen fortress to use as their base of operations, but one of Lordgenome's four generals kills Kamina in the preceding battle, and Simon sinks into depression until he meets Nia, who is revealed to be Lordgenome's daughter.

Nia helps Simon come to terms with Kamina's death, and the rest of Team Dai-Gurren prompt him to become the team's leader, leading them and other teams of humans who had captured other Gunmen and Gunmen fortresses to Lordgenome's palace, which is revealed to be a gigantic Gunmen called Teppelin. In the final battle, Simon, Nia, and Rossiu pilot Gurren Lagann to fight Lordgenome, who fights them in a similar Gunmen called Lazengann. With Lazengann and Gurren damaged, Lordgenome fights Simon with his bare hands until Simon uses his Core Drill to defeat him for good.

Seven years later, mankind prospers on the surface, with Simon and the other members of Team Dai-Gurren serving as the world's government in their new capital Kamina City. When the human population reaches one million, an alien race called the Anti-Spirals emerges and uses Nia as their messenger because the Anti-Spirals created her. They have sent the Moon on a collision course with the Earth to wipe out the planet's life and prevent them from evolving to the extent they will risk destroying the universe in a cataclysmic event called the Spiral Nemesis.

Lordgenome is resurrected as a bio-computer and reveals that he was once part of an intergalactic army of warriors who failed to stop the Anti-Spirals and forced mankind underground to protect them. Viral, an old enemy of Simon who pilots Gurren, joins forces with Lordgenome, Simon, Gurren Lagann, and Team Dai-Gurren to prevent the Moon's collision, in the process revealing it to be Lordgenome's flagship that the Anti-Spirals reprogrammed. Using it, they retrieve the real Moon from the pocket dimension the Anti-Spirals had hidden it in and go to their homeworld. They rescue Nia, and in a one-on-one Gunmen battle across the universe, Simon and Lagann destroy the Anti-Spirals. However, this causes Nia to fade away, as her existence is tied to that of the Anti-Spirals. With his life in battle finally over, Simon hands his Core Drill over to Gimmy and leaves his friends to wander the planet as a nameless vagrant, stating that his destiny was merely to "dig the tunnel to the future."

The epilogue takes place twenty years after the team defeats the Anti-Spirals. The surviving team members have retired and moved on with their lives. Simon watches over them as a squadron of Gurren Laganns flies through the night sky to join their Spiral brethren in the stars.

=== Main characters ===
The original Team Dai-Gurren. (L to R: Makken, Dayakka, Kittan, Balinbow, Kamina, Jorgun, Yoko, Simon, Kidd, Zorthy, Iraak)

Simon (シモン, Shimon)
Voiced by: Tetsuya Kakihara (Japanese); Jessie James Grelle (A.D. Vision dub), Yuri Lowenthal (Bang Zoom! dub) (English)
Simon (/siːmoʊn/) is the main protagonist of Gurren Lagann. He is introduced as a fourteen-year-old digger from Giha village who many of his peers look down upon for his timid and weak character. He greatly admires Kamina, one of his few friends in the village, and refers to him as his brother despite them not being related by blood. His discovery of the Core Drill and the Gunmen Lagann set the events of the series in motion. Simon spends much of the first quarter of the series in Kamina's footsteps, but over time gradually acquires his own fighting spirit and determination, acting independently more often until his personality mirrors that of Kamina. Throughout the series, Simon primarily pilots Lagann (Japanese for "head/face"), which can produce drills from his body when reacting to Simon's Spiral energy. He can use this ability to combine with Kamina's Gunmen, Gurren, to form Gurren Lagann, and to take control of other Gunmen.
Kamina (カミナ)
Voiced by: Katsuyuki Konishi (Japanese); Brett Weaver (A.D. Vision dub), Kyle Hebert (Bang Zoom! dub) (English)
Kamina (18 Years old) is a rebellious youth from Giha village who dreams of leaving his underground home and going to the surface world, which he saw as a child. His passionate and confident personality serves as a foil for the more timid and weak-willed Simon, and serves to instill courage in Simon. He is known for wearing sunglasses and a tattered cape that belonged to his late father. He wields a nodachi he stole from the chief of Giha village and his catchphrase of "just who the hell do you think I/we am/are?!" becomes the battle cry of his group. Although he dies early on in the show, his actions are greatly influential, as he founds Team Gurren, later renaming it Team Dai-Gurren, and acts as its leader to combat Lordgenome and the beastmen. Early on in the series, Kamina hijacks a Gunmen he names Gurren (Japanese for "scarlet"), which he pilots while combined with Simon's Lagann to form Gurren Lagann.
Yoko Littner (ヨーコ・リットナー, Yōko Rittonā)
Voiced by: Marina Inoue (Japanese); Tiffany Grant (A.D. Vision dub), Michelle Ruff (Bang Zoom! dub) (English)
Yoko (14 in the beginning-21 Years old) is a young woman from Littner, a village neighboring Giha, and is introduced as a member of a small resistance against the beastmen. She helps to introduce Simon and Kamina to the surface world, and becomes a member of Team Gurren soon after. She falls in love with Kamina early on the series, and thinks little of Simon until he begins showing signs of self-confidence. After Kamina's death, she tries to help Simon cope and forms a sisterly relationship with him. Instead of piloting a Gunmen, she wields a high-powered energy rifle and uses her marksmanship and wise counsel to aid her teammates.
Nia Teppelin (ニア・テッペリン, Nia Tepperin)
Voiced by: Yukari Fukui (Japanese); Luci Christian (A.D. Vision dub), Hynden Walch (young, Bang Zoom! dub), Bridget Hoffman (Bang Zoom! dub) (English)
Nia (14 in the beginning-21 Years old) is a major character introduced later in the series. Having lived a sheltered life as the daughter of Lordgenome, she is unaware of the war between the humans and Lordgenome until Lordgenome abandons her and Simon discovers her. She is polite, naive, and curious about the world, and acts as a soothing influence for Simon after he falls into depression following Kamina's death. The two fall in love and become engaged at the start of the second half of the series, after which she is discovered to be an agent of the Anti-Spirals. During this time, a cold and uncaring personality called "Messenger Nia" takes over her and she is forced to fight Simon against her will until he rescues her. Because her existence is tied to the Anti-Spirals, she fades away along with them following their defeat, but keeps herself alive long enough to marry Simon.

== Production ==
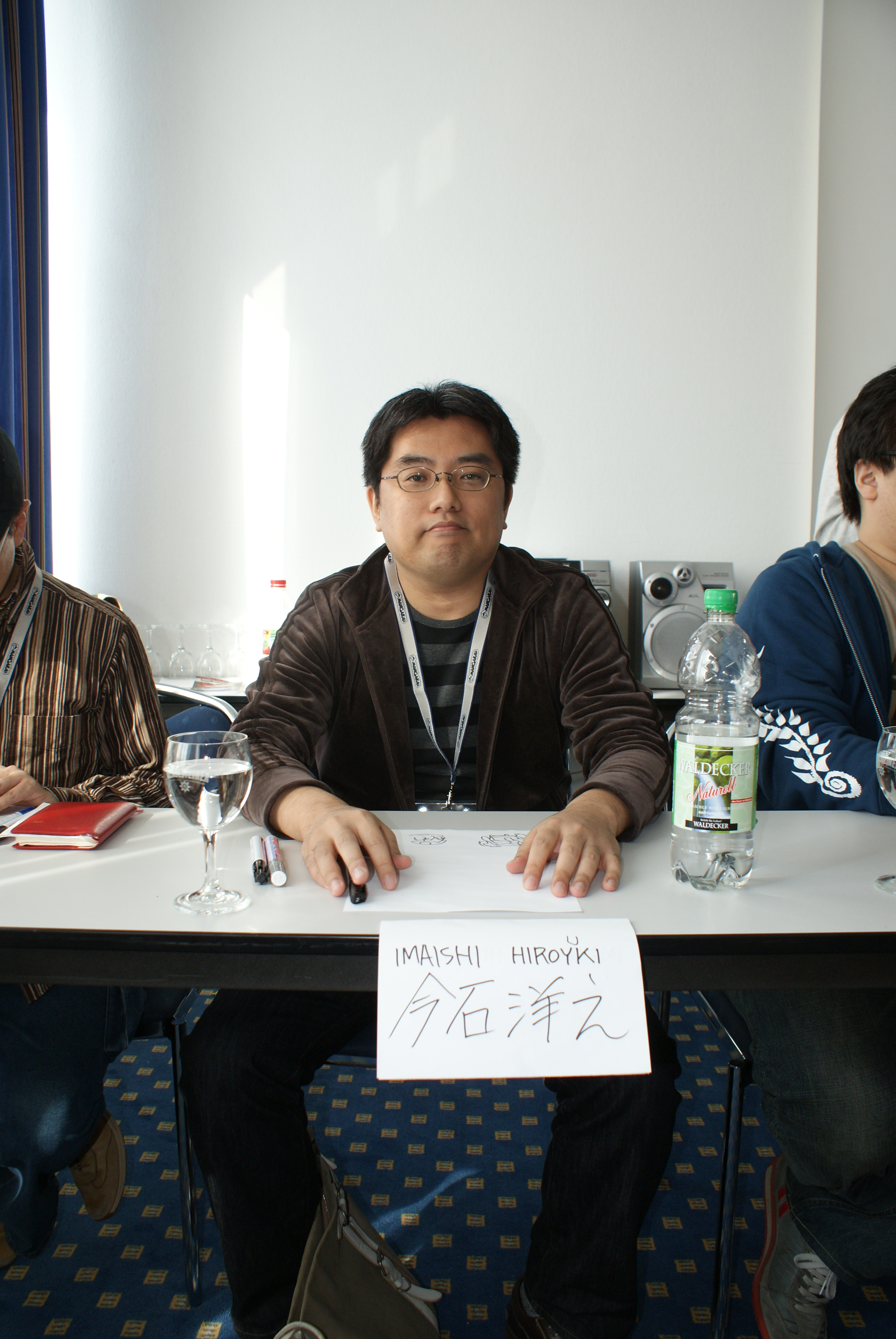
Imaishi in 2008

Gurren Lagann was first announced in July 2006 with Aniplex and Konami assisting Gainax in its making. Konami director Koichi Natsume suggested possibilities of the series getting multiple sequels. The series was directed by Hiroyuki Imaishi, who was a fan of the mecha genre, having previously done animation work for Neon Genesis Evangelion, and ever since he started working he had wanted to work in a mecha series. After working on Re: Cutey Honey with Kazuki Nakashima, Imaishi appointed him as the writer, believing him to be the best choice. Imaishi was surprised with how much material Nakashima could condense into 27 episodes. Imaishi had finished writing the main storyline long before reaching the end which facilitated the staff in making the episodes. According to Gainax president Hiroyuki Yamaga the series was in planning phases for a long time. Animation producer Yasuhiro Takeda used the time to research how the characters would live underground, although this aspect is used only briefly. Once the series started production, the team did not have much time to research materials.

In contrast to other popular series, Imaishi decided to include drills as the robot's main weapons despite its impact on the suspension of disbelief. Imaishi also wanted the series to only have robots. The robots were made organic so that they would be easier to animate. Nevertheless, animating episode 15 was challenging to the staff due to the number of shots it required. Its animator Sushio called himself the "super animator" for his work. Deciding the design of the Gurren Lagann was complicated since it was the basis for the other mechas appearing in the story.

In the making of the series, the team wanted to focus more on the underground life and Simon's imprisonment but their ideas could not be used. In the eighth episode Kamina dies to provide Simon's character development and make him become the main character. Simon's development kept on going until the final arc when staff planned ideas to make him surpass Kamina. The ending was written to finalize Simon's growth and not leave signs of a sequel. The finale had the pre-planned tragic event of Nia's death which left several staff members saddened. While the staff acknowledged how people were not satisfied with the sad conclusion, they noted that there were still issues that made her survival difficult for the characters. Once the series ended, Yamaga had the idea of releasing a film that retells the events of the series to expand the audience.

=== Influences ===
In an interview, the writer Kazuki Nakashima cites Ken Ishikawa, co-creator of Getter Robo, as one of Gurren Lagann's influences. Gurren Lagann occasionally pays homage to Ishikawa's Getter Robo, particularly towards the end of the series, where the scale becomes absurd, with the robots steadily becoming bigger and bigger, much like Getter Robo and more specifically, the manga version of Getter Robo Go. The final enemy also bears a striking resemblance to La Gooth of Records of Nothingness, another work by Ishikawa. Nakashima, however, wanted to conclude the story of Gurren Lagann in a more reasonable fashion than what Ishikawa usually does in his works. The post-apocalyptic setting, and the role of the Dai-Gurren, was influenced by Combat Mecha Xabungle.

According to Jason Green from Anime News Network, the anime was influenced by previous Gainax anime, particularly in the character development of the protagonist Simon, who goes through three stages in his character development during the three arcs of the series. Each of these stages in his development were influenced by protagonists from several previous Gainax anime: Shinji Ikari from the Neon Genesis Evangelion franchise, Noriko Takaya from Gunbuster, and Ken Kubo from Otaku no Video. The handling of the characters and personalities were tributes to the boxing manga Ashita no Joe which the staff idolized.

=== Conflicts ===
Takami Akai, an animation producer of the series and a co-founder of Gainax, announced that he would resign his position effective episode five, which aired on April 29, 2007, over comments that he made regarding posts on the Japanese textboard 2channel. Akai and another Gainax employee, Keiko Mimori, made disparaging remarks about comments criticizing the animation style of the fourth episode of Gurren Lagann, which was completely directed by guest and friend Osamu Kobayashi. With regard to reading the fan criticisms, Akai stated that it was "like putting [his] face next to an anus and breathing deeply." Fans later became aware of his comments, and he announced his departure from the company he helped found.

As a result of the series airing in a child-friendly time slot, the staff members had problems with episode 6. Although that episode had a subplot involving peeking into the women's bath, the television stations believed it was suitable when reading the script. After seeing the finished episode, the station said that it could not be aired, and a revised version of the episode was produced.

== Media ==
=== Anime series ===
Produced by the animation studio Gainax and directed by Hiroyuki Imaishi, Gurren Lagann aired in Japan on TXN stations between April 1 and September 30, 2007. The anime has 27 episodes plus two specials, the first being the uncensored version of the sixth episode, and the second is episode 5.5, a bonus that came with the Nintendo DS game.

The English version had been previously licensed by ADV Films, but was later acquired by Bandai Entertainment. A subtitle-only version was released in three volumes from July to September 2008, and an official English dub, with the episodes collected in three DVD sets, was released from November 18, 2008, to May 5, 2009. The show premiered on the Sci Fi Channel on July 28, 2008, as part of Sci Fi's Ani-Monday anime block, airing two episodes each week (and three the final week). The European distribution branch of Bandai, Beez Entertainment, distributed the series in the UK and Europe but has gone out of print since January 2012. In 2013, Anime Limited announced that they have the distribution license for Gurren Lagann on DVD and Blu-ray in the UK. In 2014, they released a limited Blu-ray Ultimate Edition on October 20, 2014, featuring the entire series, both film adaptations and the complete Parallel Works series, as well as a hardcover artbook. A standard edition Blu-ray containing the complete series was also released on the same day with the DVD release following later that year. The English version also aired on Animax across its English-language networks in Southeast Asia and South Asia starting on May 22, 2009. It was broadcast in Italy on Rai 4 between September 24, 2009, and April 1, 2010. Aniplex of America re-released the series in a limited edition DVD box set on May 9, 2013. A Blu-ray Disc box set, which includes both the television series and the two film adaptations, was released on June 26, 2013. Adult Swim began airing the series in English as part of the Toonami block on August 16, 2014.

==== Music ====
Taku Iwasaki composed the show's main background music. Four theme songs are used for the episodes; one opening theme and three ending themes. The opening theme is "Sorairo Days" (空色デイズ, Sorairo Deizu; lit. 'Sky-Blue Days') by Shoko Nakagawa. Starting from episode 17, the second verse and chorus was used, as compared to the first verse and chorus used in the previous episodes. For episodes 1 through 15 the ending theme is "Underground" by High Voltage. "Happily Ever After" by Shoko Nakagawa was used in episode 16. "Minna no Peace" (みんなのピース, Minna no Pīsu; "Everyone's Peace") by Afromania was used for episodes 17 to 27.

Tengen Toppa Gurren Lagann Character Song was released on July 25, 2007, by Aniplex, including image songs by the main voice cast, with songs sung by Simon (Tetsuya Kakihara), Kamina (Katsuyuki Konishi), and Yoko (Marina Inoue), the latter of which is a playable song in Dance Dance Revolution SuperNOVA 2. In addition, several music compilation albums have been released, most consisting of background music.

=== Manga ===
The Tengen Toppa Gurren Lagann manga, illustrated by Kotaro Mori, started serialization in the June 2007 issue of MediaWorks' magazine Dengeki Comic Gao!. The manga ended serialization in Dengeki Comic Gao! with the April 2008 issue when the magazine was discontinued, but continued serialization in ASCII Media Works' manga magazine Dengeki Daioh with the June 2008 issue and continued until the July 2013 issue. Ten tankōbon volumes were published between September 27, 2007, and June 27, 2013, in Japan under ASCII Media Works' Dengeki Comics imprint. Bandai Entertainment licensed the manga and released an English translation of the first six volumes in North America. The manga follows the same basic story as the anime, although there are some changes to the order of events, and the addition of character backstories that had been cut from the anime, such as the relationship between Dayakka and Kiyoh.

A spin-off manga entitled Tengen Toppa Gurren Lagann: Gurren Gakuen-hen (天元突破グレンラガン −紅蓮学園篇−) was serialized in Comp Ace between August 26, 2008, and January 26, 2009; a single tankōbon volume was released on March 26, 2009. The manga takes the characters from the original story and puts them in a school in a parallel world. In the manga, Simon attends Dai-Gurren Academy (ダイグレン学園, Dai Guren Gakuen) with his childhood friends Kamina and Yoko. Simon, who lives in a run down apartment building, wishes for a normal life, and meets the mysterious Nia one day when she trips down the stairs. She immediately takes a liking to Simon and declares him her husband. Kamina finds another "sister" in Nia, who shares his hot-blooded style. She enrolls in Dai-Gurren Academy, and all three must deal with the threat of students from Teppelin Academy, who wish to bring Nia back to her father, the principal.

Another spin-off manga titled Tengen Toppa Gurren Lagann 4-koma Kingdom: Yoko no Oheso-hen (天元突破グレンラガン4コマKINGDOM ヨーコのおヘソ編, Tengen Toppa Gurren Lagann 4-panel Kingdom: Yoko's Belly Button Chapter) was published by Futabasha in 2008 as a compilation of various short stories.

Another spin-off manga titled Tengen Toppa Gurren Lagann: Rasen Shounentan (天元突破グレンラガン 螺旋少年譚, Tengen Toppa Gurren Lagann: Spiral Boy) was published by Comp Ace from June 26, 2009, to January 26, 2010. In it, Simon lives in a domed city and works as a digger for a waste disposal unit. When he meets the mysterious Nia, this leads to him uncovering a conspiracy.

=== Video games ===
An online video game was developed by Konami called Tengen Toppa Gurren Lagann Chōzetsu Hakkutsu ONLINE (天元突破グレンラガン 超絶発掘ONLINE; literally "Tengen Toppa Gurren Lagann: Superior Excavation Online"). Beta testing had ended on April 16, 2007. The player takes up the role of a driller and drills for treasures in first person view. There is a shop to purchase drills—the shopkeeper is an original character named Asaki. The player can also collect digital trading cards. The game was canceled at the closed beta stage, as installing the game crashed Windows indefinitely. Konami even had to send out 500GB external hard drives to beta users so that they could back up files while reinstalling their operating systems.

A game for the Nintendo DS was released October 25, 2007, not only featuring the characters from the series, but also containing a special episode set in the early stages of the story as a pre-order bonus. In June 2010, Gainax re-acquired the video game rights to the series from Konami, which allowed Banpresto to include it in the latest installment of its storied Super Robot Wars franchise, 2nd Super Robot Wars Z: Destruction Chapter, released in April 2011.

A Pachislot game based on the anime teased by Konami was later released in February 2016.

An iOS and Android Gurren Lagann videogame was released in English on October 12, 2023, and was shut down on January 10, 2026.

=== Anime films ===
An animated film entitled Gurren Lagann the Movie: Childhood's End (劇場版 天元突破グレンラガン 紅蓮篇, Gekijōban Tengen Toppa Gurren Lagann Gurren-hen; Tengen Toppa Gurren Lagann The Movie: The Crimson Lotus Chapter), once again directed by Hiroyuki Imaishi, and written by Kazuki Nakashima, was produced by Gainax and released on September 6, 2008, in Japanese theaters and the DVD was released on April 22, 2009. The film is a compilation of the events of the first arc of the series (episodes one through fifteen) with around 20 minutes of newly animated scenes. In conjunction with the release of the film, Gainax released a series of music videos entitled Gurren Lagann Parallel Works, which contains alternative stories of Gurren Lagann set to songs from the original soundtrack. The film had a limited theatrical release on 11 screens, and grossed ¥150 million ($1.88 million) at the Japanese box office. The film had its first official English release at the Viz Pictures cinema in San Francisco, California on September 8, 2009.

A second film, Gurren Lagann The Movie: The Lights in the Sky are Stars (劇場版 天元突破グレンラガン 螺巌篇, Gekijōban Tengen Toppa Guren Lagann Lagann-hen; Tengen Toppa Gurren Lagann the Movie: The Spiral Stone Chapter) was released in Japanese theaters on April 25, 2009. It focuses on the second half of the series, contributing more new animation than the first film. The Japanese DVD for The Lights in the Sky are Stars was released on January 27, 2010. For both films, Shoko Nakagawa sang the theme songs: "Tsuzuku Sekai" (続く世界; "The World Goes On") for Childhood's End and "Namida no Tane, Egao no Hana" (涙の種、笑顔の花; "Seed of Tears, Flower of Smiles") for The Lights in the Sky are Stars. Taku Iwasaki returned to compose the films' scores.

Aniplex of America distributed both films on DVD in regular and special editions. Childhood's End was released on July 1, 2010, while The Lights in the Sky are Stars was released on July 30, 2010. Aniplex of America released the films on Blu-ray Disc as part of the Gurren Lagann Blu-ray box set on June 26, 2013. Aniplex of America re-released the films in a separate Blu-ray Disc set on July 15, 2014.

For the series' 15th anniversary, it was announced that both films would be re-shown in theaters in Japan, Taiwan and the United States as both a 2D and 4D film, along with a new release on Ultra HD Blu-ray. At the 15th Anniversary panel at AnimeNYC, it was announced the North American screenings for Childhood's End would be held on January 16 and 17, 2024 with The Lights in the Sky Are Stars following on January 23 and 24; the films were available for viewing in the original subtitled Japanese or a newly recorded English dub.

== Reception ==
=== Critical reception ===
Gurren Lagann has received near-critical acclaim since its release. The show currently sits at 100% on Rotten Tomatoes, based on 17 reviews, with the critic consensus reading, "This subterranean romp blazes on the screen with brilliant animation, charismatic characters, and subversive writing – making for a humorous spectacle that any anime connoisseur can appreciate." It is one of several science fiction anime to receive a 100% rating on Rotten Tomatoes.

Anime News Network gave Gurren Lagann a full 'A' rating, with reviewer Theron Martin describing it as "one of the liveliest series of the decade" and concluding that "Gainax's paean to boisterous, macho mecha action delivers in triumphant fashion." Anime News Network also gave the dubbed version of the first volume an 'A' rating. IGN gave the series a score of 9.7 out of 10, with reviewer Ramsey Isler describing it as "an inspiring story" and concluding that "overall it succeeds at being a great tale of the indomitable spirit of determined people." Anime World Order also gave the series a positive review, noting that it has become one of the most popular mecha anime on the Internet, which reviewer Clarissa Graffeo ascribes to its crossover appeal among various audiences who do not usually watch giant robot anime, by combining aspects from a number of different anime genres, including elements of the Super Robot, Real Robot, Shōnen, Shōjo, Seinen and Josei genres.

THEM Anime Reviews gave the anime a score of 4 out of 5 stars, with reviewer Tim Jones describing it as "Almost five-star material," and stating that it is "chuck full of action, comedy, drama, adventure, and sci-fi elements, managing to even entertain a person who couldn't care less about mecha in the process." UK Anime Network gave the first third of the series a score of 8/10, with reviewer Ross Liversidge noting that from episode 7 onwards, "the show's newfound edge makes it far more gripping," and concludes that it is a "high quality release" and "a fun, punchy series that stands out from the crowd." On the review website Mania.com, reviewer Chris Beveridge gave the first two-thirds of the series a full 'A' grade. He described the first third as "chaotic, magical and engaging," and then described the second third as captivating "with non-standard storytelling ideas for an anime series" and concluded that it was "fun, exciting, unpredictable and filled with the usual positive messages but done without any serious preaching."

Ian Wolf of Anime UK News stated, "when you look at the way that it was made as a whole, the story that was created, the characters that were portrayed, and the sheer scale of the entire project, it all combines into what is probably one of the greatest anime of all time." Guillermo Kurten of Comic Book Resources (CBR) called it one of the "modern classics" of anime, praising the art style and animation, the action, the mechs, the cast of characters and their emotional relationships, the world-building with gradually rising stakes, the "over-the-top and light-hearted" tone, and for dealing with real-world issues. Michael Iacono of CBR also praised the anime's use of hip-hop, including "what might be the greatest hip-hop song in the genre" of anime and hip-hop.

The Encyclopedia of Science Fiction described Gurren Lagann as a gloriously absurd and extravagantly ambitious mecha anime, praising its spectacular animation and ability to convey a vast sense of wonder, particularly in its climactic battles of escalating cosmic proportions. It highlighted the series' emphasis on determination and willpower, while criticizing its tendency to associate these qualities with masculinity and elevate them above intelligence. The encyclopedia also highlighted the portrayal of the gay character Leeron through it noted it also unfortunately used stereotypes and led to occasional expressions of gay panic by other characters. Although it admired the show's exuberance, it found that its broad humor and frantic silliness sometimes undermined attempts at emotional depth. The review interpreted the series partly as a reaction against the darker mecha narratives influenced by Neon Genesis Evangelion, emphasizing its references to the more optimistic super robot anime of the 1970s and 1980s. It also noted the series' enormous popularity and its role in director Hiroyuki Imaishi's subsequent establishment of Studio Trigger.

=== Accolades ===
The Gurren Lagann anime series received an Excellence Prize at the 11th Japan Media Arts Festival in 2007. Its director Hiroyuki Imaishi received an individual award for "Personal Best" at the 12th Animation Kobe Festival that same year for his work on the series. In 2008, during the 7th annual Tokyo Anime Awards held at the Tokyo International Anime Fair, Gurren Lagann won the "Best Television Production" award. In addition, the "Best Character Design" award was given to the character designer Atsushi Nishigori for his work on the anime. The series was also nominated for the 39th Seiun Awards in the Best Media category in 2008.

Japanator named Gurren Lagann the fourth best anime of the 2000s, calling it "a flawless execution of storytelling". Android Authority ranked it the second best anime on Netflix. Paste Magazine ranked it among the top 50 anime of all time.

=== Popular culture ===
Influences from and references to Gurren Lagann can be found in popular culture ranging from Japanese anime and video games, to American comics and animation, as well as politics in Europe. During a political debate over whether the British Union Flag should be updated by incorporating the Welsh Dragon, The Daily Telegraph newspaper held a contest for readers to submit their designs and have other readers vote for the winning design. On December 11, 2007, a Gurren Lagann-based design submitted from Norway won the contest, winning by a wide margin of 55% of the votes. Gurren Lagann has had an influence on the Transformers franchise, with the creators of Transformers: Animated citing it as an inspiration. The art director and lead character designer Derrick Wyatt stated that, while he "hadn't seen Gurren Lagann until after [they] had finished most of the first season of TFA," he confirmed that the creators have "definitely been inspired" by it ever since, particularly during the second and third seasons of Transformers: Animated.

The success of Gurren Lagann led to the creation of Studio Trigger, founded by director Hiroyuki Imaishi. Gurren Lagann's visual humor and style defined their work, and the studio is seen as a successor to Gainax. Mecha designer Shigeto Koyama, who did design work for Gurren Lagann, later worked on the concept design for Baymax in the 2014 Disney film Big Hero 6. Upon the film's release in Japan, comparisons were drawn to Gurren Lagann from Japanese audiences. Gurren Lagann is frequently referenced in the 2016 video game Kirby: Planet Robobot. Gurren Lagann was cited as an inspiration for the drill weaponry and narrative themes present in the 2018 game ZeroRanger. The French television show Wakfu also pays homage to Gurren Lagann. In League of Legends, Rumble's "Super Galaxy Rumble" skin, as well as many of the quotes with the skin, is based on the anime. In South Park: The Fractured but Whole, one of Stan Marsh's catch phrases is from the anime.

In an April 2019 interview with Diego Molano, creator of Victor and Valentino, he said that the series is "one of my all-time favorite series to watch," and even puts it in the background when he draws or writes. He also called the series brilliant, as he always finds "new things to admire" and praises the storyboards of the show for being "incredibly energetic, expressive and appealing."
