= Apocrypha Getter Robot Dash =

Japanese Manga Series

- Apocrypha Getter Robot Darkness
- Promotional image of Apocrypha Getter Robot Dash from Magazine Z #2008-08

偽書ゲッターロボダークネス (Gishō Gettā Robo Dākunesu)
- Genre: Mecha
- Created by: Ken Ishikawa; Go Nagai
- Manga
- Written by: Hideaki Nishikawa
- Published by: Kodansha; Hakusensha
- Magazine: Magazine Z (July 26, 2008–January 26, 2009); Young Animal Arashi (July 28, 2009–November 28, 2014)
- Original run: July 26, 2008 – November 28, 2014
- Volumes: 4

Apocrypha Getter Robo Darkness (偽書ゲッターロボダークネス, Gishō Gettā Robo Dākunesu), originally titled Apocrypha Getter Robo Dash (偽書ゲッターロボダッシュ, Gishō Gettā Robo Dasshu), is a Japanese manga written and illustrated by Hideaki Nishikawa based on Go Nagai and Ken Ishikawa's classic Getter Robo series. It was initially serialized monthly in Kodansha's Magazine Z. As the title suggests, the story takes place in an alternate universe, where the concepts of the Getter series are seen under the perspective of Nishikawa. When Magazine Z ceased publication in early 2009 the story was moved to Hakusensha's monthly magazine Young Animal Arashi, starting in the July 2009 issue, with the title changed to Apocryphal Getter Robo Darkness. The chapters were renumbered at this time, with chapter 0 in Arashi being a reprint of chapter 6 in Magazine Z, the last chapter published there. Previously published chapters were compiled into a volume titled "Shidōhen" (initiation chapter).
