= Getter Robo =

Japanese manga series

- First aizōban volume cover
- ゲッターロボ
- Genre: Super robot
- Creators: Ken Ishikawa; Go Nagai; Dynamic Production
- Character designer: Kazuo Komatsubara
- Music: Shunsuke Kikuchi
- Country of origin: Japan
- Original language: Japanese
- No. of episodes: 51

Production
- Fuji Television; Toei Animation

Original release
- Network: FNS (Fuji TV)
- Release: April 4, 1974 – May 8, 1975

Related
- Manga
- Written by: Go Nagai (Note: Although Go Nagai is credited as the writer and Ken Ishikawa as the illustrator of the manga, Getter Robo was actually written and illustrated by several artists from Dynamic Pro including Nagai and Ishikawa themselves.)
- Illustrated by: Ken Ishikawa
- Published by: Shogakukan; Futabasha (reprint)
- Magazine: Weekly Shōnen Sunday
- Original run: April 7, 1974 – August 24, 1975
- Volumes: 6
- Manga

Shin Getter Robo
- Written by: Ken Ishikawa
- Published by: Futabasha
- Magazine: Weekly Manga Action
- Original run: 1996 – 1998
- Volumes: 2
- Anime film
- Great Mazinger vs. Getter Robo

Getter Robo (Japanese: ゲッターロボ, Hepburn: Gettā Robo) is a Japanese mecha media franchise created by Ken Ishikawa and Go Nagai. An anime television series produced by Toei Animation was broadcast on Fuji TV from April 4, 1974, to May 8, 1975, with a total of 51 episodes. The manga was serialized in Shogakukan's Weekly Shōnen Sunday from April 7, 1974, to August 24, 1975, and was compiled in six volumes by Shogakukan and three volumes by Futabasha.

== Plot ==
The plot involves three strong-willed teenagers: Ryoma Nagare, Hayato Jin and Musashi Tomoe, who pilot three specially designed combat jets (Eagle, Jaguar, and Bear) which can be combined into three different giant robots, Getter-1 (balanced and for flight combat), Getter-2 (fast and for ground combat), and Getter-3 (strong and for marine combat). They were assembled by Prof. Saotome, who conceived the Getter Robo project as a means of deep-space exploration. The Getter machine is powered by an energy source known as Getter Rays, which are the invisible manifestation of the pilot's willpower. It became instead Earth's first line of defense against the Dinosaur Empire, a civilization of reptile-like humanoids who evolved from the now-extinct dinosaurs that roamed the earth millions of years ago. They have lived many years underground after being forced to do so by getter ray radiation from space that did not affect the apes who evolved into humans; they now want to reclaim the Earth as theirs and destroy humanity.

== Development ==
While already collaborating with Toei Animation producer Ken Ariga, Dynamic Pro president Takashi Nagai approached his brother and the founder of Dynamic Pro, Go Nagai, along with Ariga, to initiate the creation of another mecha series. Takashi proposed the concept of three main characters, and during discussions with Ken Ariga, the idea of three different piloted robots combining into one robot with three distinct forms emerged. Although Go Nagai was initially confused by the concept, he agreed to participate in the project. Later, it was decided that the anime production could not proceed until a manga version was also released. With Go Nagai already illustrating and writing multiple manga creations such as Mazinger Z, Violence Jack, and Cutie Honey, he expressed his inability to take on more work to his brother and recommended his assistant and friend, Ken Ishikawa, for the job.

Go Nagai assisted with the creation of characters Getter-2 and Getter-3 when Ishikawa faced difficulties after designing Getter-1. Nagai also contributed foundational ideas for Getter Robo, such as the concept of Getter Rays, but left the detailed development of the settings and plot to Ishikawa.

== Volume list ==
Shogakukan has compiled the series' chapters into six tankōbon volumes. The first four volumes compile the chapters of the Dinosaur Empire arc (equivalent to the Getter Robo anime story) while the last two volumes compiles the chapters of the Hundred Demons Empire arc (equivalent to the Getter Robo G anime story). The manga was re-released in three aizōban volumes by Futabasha in 2002.

Futabasha edition

No.	Japanese release date	Japanese ISBN
1	February 19, 2002	4-575-72372-X
Prologue; Chapters 1 to 7
2	February 19, 2002	4-575-72373-8
Chapters 8 to 13; Extra chapter
3	March 19, 2002	4-575-72380-0
Chapters 14 to 18

== Sequels and remakes ==
=== Getter Robo G ===
The last episode of the Getter Robo series showed the defeat of the Dinosaur Empire, but with a high price: the death of one of the Getter Robo pilots, Musashi Tomoe. It also introduced a new enemy, the Clan of the 100 Demons, who at that very moment were preparing an invasion of Earth from space. This would be the basis of a sequel with a new, improved version of the original robot, piloted by Ryoma, Hayato, and newcomer pilot Benkei Kuruma. The series, called Getter Robo G, would not be as long and successful as the first one, lasting 39 episodes. The new robot and its pilots were also featured in the Go Nagai short features Great Mazinger vs. Getter Robo G and Grendizer, Getter Robo G & Great Mazinger: Decisive Showdown! Great Sea Beast, despite the fact Getter Robo was conceived as existing in a different universe from the Mazinger/Grendizer continuity.

G also became famous in the U.S. as it was included in edited form as part of the Force Five robot series produced for the American market, where its name was changed to Starvengers. These episodes would later be the basis for the direct to video series; Robo Formers. Additionally, toys based on the Getter Robo mecha were licensed by the U.S. toy company Mattel and sold under the company's Shogun Warriors toy line.

There was a limited video release of Starvengers in the UK, renamed Formators.

=== Getter Robo Go ===
After some years, the franchise was revived in 1991 with the new series Getter Robo Go, directed by Hiroki Shibata, and featuring a new robot and an all-new team. While originally planned as a remake of Mazinger Z, sponsor Yutaka Nakamura turned instead to rebooting Getter Robo, with the anime focusing on a new Getter Team, Go Ichimonji, Sho Tachibana and Gai Daido, fighting the forces of Prof. Rando and his Metal Beasts. At the same time, Nagai and Ishikawa penned a 7 volume Getter Robo Go manga from 1990 to 1993, with a dramatically different plot, albeit sharing several characters. The Go manga continued the story of the original 1970s installments, and later featured the debut of the Shin Getter Robo in its final 3 volumes. Many products were released, such as CDs, toys, video cassettes, and later a DVD set. In addition to that, this was the first time Go Nagai and Toei Animation began working together since the Gaiking incident.

In the advent of Getter Robo Go's success, the influence and popularity of the original show continued in Japan, and it found a way to stay with fans through video games (like the Super Robot Wars game series, in which the Getter Robo is one of its lineup mainstays) and other merchandise. The series was even spoofed successfully in the mecha anime series Martian Successor Nadesico, where the anime-within-anime Gekiganger III was a direct pun (and homage) to the Getter Robo legacy, among many other super robot series. Gekiganger III was the favorite show of the character Gai in Martian Successor Nadesico. His voice actor, Tomokazu Seki, has also said that Getter Robo is his favorite anime. Tomokazu Seki would also voice Go (the protagonist of Getter Robo Go) in Getter Robo Armageddon.

=== Shin Getter Robo ===
After the ending of Getter Robo Go, Ishikawa, motivated by his editor Kazuki Nakashima, decided to extend and explain some topics, like what really happened to Benkei and the Saotome Institute, the reason Ryoma was scared of Getter Rays, what Getter is and such. The series features the return of the original Getter Robo, alongside Getter Robo G, the latter of whom had mysteriously vanished alongside Benkei as of the events of Getter Go. The manga would also feature the first full look at Shin Getter 2, who had made a brief appearance in Getter Go, and the first ever appearance of Shin Getter 3. Additionally, it featured new insect-like enemies from the far future, later used in Getter Arc, which would also revisit the fate of Getter G. All of this was told in the Getter Robo Go manga prequel, Shin Getter Robo, started in 1996 and lasted two tankōbon volumes. The title was later reprinted into a single aizōban volume of 500 pages.

=== Getter Robo Arc ===
Getter Robo Arc is a three-volume manga taking place in a science fiction post-apocalyptic futuristic setting. Ryoma's son Takuma joins the human-dinosaur hybrid Kamui and Messiah Tayel's younger brother Baku Yamagishi aboard the Getter Robo Arc, fighting, alongside the Dinosaur Empire, the insect-like enemies of the Andromeda Flow Country (アンドロメダ流国, Andoromeda Ryōkoku) from the far future. Unfortunately, Super Robot Comics, the magazine in which Arc was published, was canceled and the story ended prematurely. On November 2, 2020, an anime adaptation of Arc was announced. It was released in 2021, and was produced by Bee Media and directed by Jun Kawagoe.

=== Getter Robo Armageddon ===
The concept was re-invented in 1998 with the retro-styled OVA Change Getter Robo!!: The Last Day of the World (released outside Japan as Getter Robo: Armageddon). Giant Robo director Yasuhiro Imagawa was to direct the OVA, but had a falling out with the studio after Episode 3. This would lead to Jun Kawagoe taking over as the director from episode 4 onwards, a position he would keep throughout the following 2 OVAs. The OVA ran 13 episodes and was presented as the sequel to a story - which was never actually animated - about the Getter Team fighting a race of amorphous aliens called "Invaders." This production made use of an animation style reminiscent of the old Getter Robo and other 1970s anime shows with thick, sketchy lines, albeit with character and robot designs more reminiscent of Ken Ishikawa's original manga.

=== Shin Getter Robo vs Neo Getter Robo ===
Two years later, the same staff returned for the four-part OVA Shin Getter Robo vs Neo Getter Robo. The plot of the OVA is loosely based on the original Getter Robo, with the Dinosaur Empire as the antagonists. The OVA introduces a new Getter Robo, the titular Neo Getter Robo, which is similar in design to the Getter Robo from Getter Robo Go and also shares elements of Getter Robo G's design. In addition, it features characters from Getter Robo Go that are closer in personality to those found in the original manga than the anime adaptation. The OVA also included a three part miniseries that lasted five minutes called Dynamic Super Robot's Grand Battle which shows several Go Nagai created robots battling with the Mycene empire from the anime Great Mazinger. The short included appearances by Getter Robo G and Shin Getter Robo.

=== New Getter Robo ===
In 2004, director Jun Kawagoe produced a new OVA called New Getter Robo, this time being a re-telling of the Getter Robo story. In this new story, humanity is under attack by demonic creatures called Oni. As in the original stories, Dr. Saotome creates a series of Getter-Ray-powered robots to fight the monsters, culminating the creation of Getter Robo. Both the robot and the Getter Team were redesigned for the new series. Getter Robo is more detailed and mechanical-looking than its earlier forms, and all three pilots - Ryoma, Hayato, and a combination of Musashi and Benkei's archetypes named "Benkei Musashibo" - are as violent and antiheroic as they were in the 70s manga. Ryoma is now an irresponsible street fighter, Hayato a bloodthirsty, sadistic terrorist, and Benkei a hedonistic and gluttonous apprentice monk.

=== Getter Robo Hien ===
In 2007, a new manga entitled Getter Robo Hien: The Earth Suicide was released in Japan. It has since concluded at 3 volumes, and was serialized in a monthly webcomic. This series continues the Ken Ishikawa continuity of Getter manga, temporally taking place after Getter Robo Go and before Getter Arc. The series features an older Hayato leading a new team of Getter Pilots (and a new Getter) as they defend the earth from large plant-like monsters.

=== Apocrypha Getter Robo ===
Dash

Published in 2008, the manga Apocrypha Getter Robot Dash was released in Japanese magazine Magazine Z, authored by Hideaki Nishikawa for another alternate re-telling of the original Getter Robo story. After Magazine Z discontinued in 2009, it was renamed Apocrypha Getter Robo DARKNESS.

Darkness

Apocrypha Getter Robo Darkness continued serialization with its new title under seinen magazine Young Animal Arashi five months later. Chapter 0 of Getter Robo DARKNESS, published in the July 2009 issue of the magazine, is a reprint of the sixth chapter of Getter Robo DASH, the last one published in Magazine Z before its cancellation.

=== Getter Robo High ===
Published in Kindai Mahjong from 2016 to 2018, Getter Robo High is a spinoff of the Getter Robo manga featuring three pilots that face off against a sudden attack from an underwater civilization. The Key difference being the mode of battle, now using mahjong matches to decide conflicts. The manga was written by Bingo Morihashi and drawn by Drill Jill. The manga was announced to be receiving an English translation by Mahjong pros and is set to release on May 30, 2026.

== List of Getter Robo series ==
Manga

Title	Writer	Illustrator	Publishing company	Magazine	No. of volumes	Original run
Getter Robo	Go Nagai	Ken Ishikawa	Shogakukan	Weekly Shōnen Sunday	6	1974–1975
Getter Robo Go	Ken Ishikawa (Note: In Getter Robo Go, Shin and Arc Ken Ishikawa is credited as writer and illustrator while Go Nagai is credited as original author/creator.)		Tokuma Shoten	Monthly Shōnen Captain	7	1991–1993
Shin Getter Robo	Ken Ishikawa		Futabasha	Weekly Manga Action	2	1996–1998
Getter Robo Arc	Ken Ishikawa		Futabasha	Super Robot Magazine	3	2001–2003
Getter Robo Armageddon: Try to Remember	Yasuhiro Imagawa	Hisashi Matsumoto	Kodansha	Magazine Z	3	2001
Getter Robo Hien: The Earth Suicide	Naoto Tsushima		Gentosha	Comic Magna	3	2007–2008
Apocrypha Getter Robo Darkness	Hideaki Nishikawa		Hakusensha	Young Animal Arashi	4	2008–2014
Getter Robo Devolution	Eiichi Shimizu	Tomohiro Shimoguchi	Akita Shoten	Bessatsu Shōnen Champion	5	2015–2019

Anime

Title	Director	Head writer	Character designer	Composer	Studio	No. of episodes	Release year
Getter Robo	Tomoharu Katsumata	Shun'ichi Yukimuro	Kazuo Komatsubara	Shunsuke Kikuchi	Toei Animation	51	1974–1975
Getter Robo G	Osamu Kasai	Shozo Uehara	Kazuo Komatsubara	Shunsuke Kikuchi	Toei Animation	39	1975–1976
Getter Robo Go	Hiroki Shibata	Hiroyuki Hoshiyama	Joji Oshima	Chumei Watanabe	Toei Animation	50	1991–1992
Getter Robo Armageddon	Yasuhiro Imagawa (ep. 1–3) Jun Kawagoe (ep. 4–13)	Yasuhiro Imagawa (ep. 1–4) Shinzo Fujita (ep. 5–13)	Kenji Hayama	Yasunori Iwasaki	Brain's Base & Studio OX	13	1998–1999
Shin Getter Robo x Neo Getter Robo	Jun Kawagoe	Shizo Fujita	Fujio Suzuki	Kazuo Nobuta	Brain's Base	4	2000–2001
New Getter Robo	Jun Kawagoe	Shinsuke Onishi	Fujio Suzuki	Kazuo Nobuta & Try Force	Brain's Base	13	2004
Getter Robo Arc	Jun Kawagoe	Tadashi Hayakawa	Hideyuki Motohashi	Yoshichika Kuriyama & Shiho Terada	Bee Media & Studio A-Cat	13	2021

== Video games ==
The various Getter Robos are mainstay characters in the Super Robot Wars series by Banpresto, usually found in the super deformed style which the series is popular for; Getter appeared in almost every non-original exclusive installment with Gundam and Mazinger (except for Judgement, K, L, UX, BX, and X, in which Getter does not take part). The Getter Robos also received their own turn based strategy game similar to the Super Robot Wars series for the Sony PlayStation titled Getter Robo Daikessen!. This game featured the various versions of Getter Robo from the manga and anime and OVAs produced until that point, as well as an original pink mecha piloted by a trio of ninja women. Shin Getter and Black Getter are included in Another Century's Episode 3, which features the storyline of Getter Robo Armageddon.

== Legacy ==
In an interview with Kazuki Nakashima, the writer of Gurren Lagann and chief editor on the Getter Robo Saga compilation, Getter Robo was cited as one of Gurren Lagann's main inspirations. Video game company SNK also commented they were influenced by the series when designing the three main characters of The King of Fighters '94.

=== Live-action film ===
A live-action film adaptation was announced, produced by Big One and directed by Junya Okabe with a planned release for the franchise's 50th anniversary in 2025.
