= Getter Robo Devolution =

Japanese manga series

- Getter Robo Devolution: The Last 3 Minutes of the Universe

ゲッターロボ DEVOLUTION ~宇宙最後の3分間~ (Getter Robot Devolution - Uchuu Saigo no 3-punkan)
- Genre: Mecha
- Created by: Ken Ishikawa; Go Nagai
- Manga
- Written by: Eiichi Shimizu
- Illustrated by: Tomohiro Shimoguchi
- Published by: Akita Shoten
- English publisher: NA: Seven Seas Entertainment
- Magazine: Bessatsu Shōnen Champion
- Original run: December 12, 2015 – June 12, 2019
- Volumes: 5

Getter Robo Devolution: The Last 3 Minutes of the Universe (Japanese: ゲッターロボ DEVOLUTION ~宇宙最後の3分間~, Hepburn: Gettā Robo Devolution - Uchuu Saigo no 3-punkan) is a manga written by Eiichi Shimizu and illustrated by Tomohiro Shimoguchi. It is a re-imagining of the 1974 manga, created by Go Nagai and Ken Ishikawa

== Synopsis ==
A group of spatial distorting aliens, called the Devolved, start attacking the planet. Three teenagers, Ryoma Nagare, Hayato Jin, and Musashi Tomoe are brought together by Dr. Saotome for their connection to the mysterious Getter Rays. The three of them together need to pilot the most powerful weapon, the Getter Robo, in order to defeat the Devolved.

== Publication ==
Written by Eiichi Shimizu and illustrated by Tomohiro Shimoguchi, Getter Robo Devolution: The Last 3 Minutes of the Universe was serialized in Akita Shoten's Bessatsu Shōnen Champion magazine from December 12, 2015, to June 12, 2019. The series is a re-imagining of the original Getter Robo manga series by Go Nagai and Ken Ishikawa.

No.	Original release date	Original ISBN	English release date	English ISBN
1	July 8, 2016	978-4-253-13141-4	June 26, 2018	978-1-626926-18-9
2	January 6, 2017	978-4-253-13142-1	September 18, 2018	978-1-626926-97-4
3	October 6, 2017	978-4-253-13143-8	April 16, 2019	978-1-642750-09-6
4	October 5, 2018	978-4-253-13144-5	October 29, 2019	978-1-642756-97-5
5	October 8, 2019	978-4-253-13145-2	October 20, 2020	978-1-64505-475-7

== See also ==
- Ultraman – Another manga series from the same creators
