= Hien =

Hien may refer to:

- Hien (Netherlands), a village near Dodewaard
- Kawasaki Ki-61 (Japanese: 飛燕), a Japanese World War II aircraft
- Getter Robot Hien (Japanese: 飛焔), a manga and fictional character
- Hien (character) (Japanese: 緋鉛), a Japanese fictional character
- Strider Hien, a character from Strider 2
- Hien, a character from the Aero Fighters series

== People with the given name ==
- Nguyen Thanh Hien, Vietnamese-Hungarian singer
