= Getter Robo Go =

Japanese anime and manga series

- Cover of Getter Robot Go Ongakushu CD album. From left to right, characters Gai, Go and Sho, and Getter Robot's main form in the back.
- ゲッターロボ號
- Genre: Mecha
- Created by: Go Nagai; Ken Ishikawa; Dynamic Planning
- Directed by: Hiroki Shibata
- Music by: Michiaki Watanabe
- No. of episodes: 50

Production
- Producers: Chiyo Okazaki (TV Setouchi); Tatsuya Yoshida
- Production companies: TV Setouchi; Big West; Toei Animation

Original release
- Network: TXN (TSC, TV Tokyo)
- Release: February 11, 1991 – January 27, 1992

Related
- Manga
- Written by: Tatsuya Yasuda
- Published by: Shogakukan
- Magazine: TV-Kun; Coro Coro Comic Special
- Original run: December 28, 1990 – February 1992
- Volumes: 2
- Manga
- Written by: Ken Ishikawa
- Published by: Tokuma Shoten; Futabasha (reprint)
- English publisher: US: Viz Media
- Magazine: Monthly Shōnen Captain
- Original run: February 1991 – May 1993
- Volumes: 7

Getter Robo Go (ゲッターロボ號, Gettā Robo Gō), sometimes romanized as Getter Robot Go and known in the United States as Venger Robo, is a Japanese mecha anime and manga series and the third entry in the Getter Robo franchise originally created by Go Nagai and Ken Ishikawa.

The anime was originally broadcast from February 11, 1991, to January 27, 1992, on TV Setouchi and TV Tokyo with a total of 50 episodes. Along with the TV series, a few manga versions were released. One of them was released in the US under the name Venger Robo and in Spain as Venger Robot Go. The international title given to the anime on Toei's website is Goldbang.

The manga written by Ishikawa is a sequel to the original Getter Robo manga and its second instalment, Getter Robo G, taking place some years after G. Go itself is followed by the Getter Robo Arc manga and anime. The Getter Robo Go anime is a very loose adaptation of the manga.

== Premise ==
In the year 200X, Doctor Rando, a genius scientist gone mad, has broken the peace on the Earth by trying to conquer the world from his Polar base, using an army of his Metal Beasts, super robots developed by him to conquer the world and led by his genetically created officers. No regular weapons seem to work against the Metal Beasts. To combat him, Japan's Defense Agency requests the cooperation of NISAR, the Japan International Aerospace Corporation, which has developed a robot, the Getter Robo. Dr. Tachibana, the head of the Getter Robo project, is reluctant to use the robot for battle. Despite this, Getter Robo, piloted by Go Ichimonji (later joined by Sho Tachibana and Gai Daido), is able to defeat a Metal Beast with the sacrifice of Shinichi, the son of Dr. Tachibana. This prompts the improvement of Getter to make it a transforming machine piloted by three persons, capable of defeating the Metal Beasts and stopping Dr. Rando from conquering the world.

=== Episodes ===
No.	Title	Directed by	Written by	Original release date
1	"Dispatch! Battle without Weapons!"; Transliteration: "shutsudō!! buki naki tatakai" (Japanese: 出動!! 武器なき戦い)	Hiroki Shibata	Hiroyuki Hoshiyama	February 11, 1991
2	"Battle Helicopter"; Transliteration: "batoru heri kōbōsen" (Japanese: バトルヘリ攻防戦)	Toru Yamada	Yukiyoshi Ohashi	February 18, 1991
3	"Arm up! Getter Robo"; Transliteration: "busō seyo! gettā robo" (Japanese: 武装せよ!ゲッターロボ)	Yoshikata Nitta	Junki Takegami	February 25, 1991
4	"Double Bomber Explosion!"; Transliteration: "daburu bonbā sakuretsu!!" (Japanese: ダブルボンバー炸裂!!)	Masayuki Akechi	Shoji Tonoike	March 4, 1991
5	"Gai, Death Diving"; Transliteration: "gai, kesshi no daibingu" (Japanese: 剴、決死のダイビング)	Takao Yoshizawa	Hiroyuki Hoshiyama	March 11, 1991
6	"Dr. Tachibana's recovery strategy!" Transliteration: "tachibana-hakase dakkaisakusen!" (Japanese: 橘博士奪回作戦!)	Takenori Kawada	Yukiyoshi Ohashi	March 18, 1991
7	"Scream !! Burning Brotherly Bonds"; Transliteration: "sakebe!! atsuki kyōdai no kizuna" (Japanese: 叫べ!! 熱き兄弟の絆)	Toru Yamada	Junki Takegami	March 25, 1991
8	"Amazing! The enemy is in the sky" Transliteration: "kyōi! teki wa ōzora ni ari" (Japanese: 驚異!敵は大空にあり)	Yoshikata Nitta	Shoji Tonoike	April 1, 1991
9	"NISAR Headquarters close call!" Transliteration: "neizā honbu kikiippatsu" (Japanese: ネイザー本部危機一髪)	Masayuki Akechi	Hiroyuki Hoshiyama	April 8, 1991
10	"Clash !! Terrifying Undersea Battle"; Transliteration: "gekitotsu!! kyōfu no kaitei kessen" (Japanese: 激突!! 恐怖の海底決戦)	Takao Yoshizawa	Yukiyoshi Ohashi	April 15, 1991
11	"Combine! Steel Warrior"; Transliteration: "gattai seyo! kōtetsu no senshi" (Japanese: 合体せよ!鋼鉄の戦士)	Takenori Kawada	Junki Takegami	April 22, 1991
12	"Sho's Revenge Ballad"; Transliteration: "shō, fukushū no barādo" (Japanese: 翔、復讐のバラード)	Toru Yamada	Hiroyuki Hoshiyama	April 29, 1991
13	"Counterattck! Getter Gai"; Transliteration: "hangeki seyo! gettā gai" (Japanese: 反撃せよ!ゲッター剴)	Yoshikata Nitta	Yukiyoshi Ohashi	May 6, 1991
14	"The Fear of Cloned Humans"; Transliteration: "kurōn ningen no kyōfu" (Japanese: クローン人間の恐怖)	Masayuki Akechi	Junki Takegami	May 13, 1991
15	"Rescue the Children"; Transliteration: "kodomo tachi o kyūshutsu seyo" (Japanese: 子供たちを救出せよ)	Takao Yoshizawa	Shoji Tonoike	May 20, 1991
16	"Can you do it? First Underwater Combination"; Transliteration: "dekiru ka? kaichū hatsu gattai" (Japanese: 出来るか?海中初合体)	Takenori Kawada	Hiroyuki Hoshiyama	May 27, 1991
17	"Stand Tetsu! Beat Yourself"; Transliteration: "tate tetsu! jibun ni kate" (Japanese: 立てテツ!自分に勝て)	Hiroki Shibata	Yukiyoshi Ohashi	June 3, 1991
18	"Lawless Challenger"; Transliteration: "muhō naru chousensha" (Japanese: 無法なる挑戦者)	Toru Yamada	Junki Takegami	June 10, 1991
19	"Ghost of the Metal Beast"; Transliteration: "metaru bīsuto no bōrei" (Japanese: メタルビーストの亡霊)	Yoshikata Nitta	Yukiyoshi Ohashi	June 17, 1991
20	"Brilliant Speed Showdown"; Transliteration: "karei naru supīdo taiketsu" (Japanese: 華麗なるスピード対決)	Masayuki Akechi	Hiroyuki Hoshiyama	June 24, 1991
21	"NISAR Base Destruction Operation"; Transliteration: "neizā kichi kaimetsu sakusen" (Japanese: ネイザー基地壊滅作戦)	Takao Yoshizawa	Shoji Tonoike	July 1, 1991
22	"Tragedy! Underwater Dictator"; Transliteration: "higeki! shinkai no dokusaisha" (Japanese: 悲劇!深海の独裁者)	Takenori Kawada	Junki Takegami	July 8, 1991
23	"Fight Together! My Friend"; Transliteration: "tomoni tatakae! waga senyū yo" (Japanese: 共に戦え!我戦友よ)	Toru Yamada	Yukiyoshi Ohashi	July 15, 1991
24	"The Human Evaporation Case"; Transliteration: "ningen jōhatsu jiken o oe" (Japanese: 人間蒸発事件を追え)	Yoshikata Nitta	Hiroyuki Hoshiyama	July 22, 1991
25	"Fight Gai! Promising Tears"; Transliteration: "tatakae gai! namida no yakusoku" (Japanese: 戦えガイ!涙の約束)	Masayuki Akechi	Shoji Tonoike	July 29, 1991
26	"Rampage! Baron Yasha"; Transliteration: "dai abare! yasha danshaku" (Japanese: 大暴れ!ヤシャ男爵)	Takao Yoshizawa	Yukiyoshi Ohashi	August 5, 1991
27	"Bay City's Close Call"; Transliteration: "beishitei kikiippatsu" (Japanese: ベイシティ危機一髪)	Takenori Kawada	Junki Takegami	August 12, 1991
28	"The Holy Sword, Tomahawk"; Transliteration: "seiken sōdo tomahōku" (Japanese: 聖剣ソードトマホーク)	Toru Yamada	Yukiyoshi Ohashi	August 19, 1991
29	"Sho, an oath for tomorrow" Transliteration: "shō, ashita e no chikai" (Japanese: 翔,明日への誓い)	Hiroki Shibata	Hiroyuki Hoshiyama	August 26, 1991
30	"Go! Enemy of the Blue Sky"; Transliteration: "todoke! aoki uchuu (sora) no teki" (Japanese: とどけ!蒼き宇宙(そら)の敵)	Yoshikata Nitta	Shoji Tonoike	September 2, 1991
31	"Mysterious Gentleman Narukiss"; Transliteration: "nazo no kikōshi narukisu" (Japanese: 謎の貴公子ナルキス)	Masayuki Akechi	Junki Takegami	September 9, 1991
32	"G-Arm Rizer Activated!"; Transliteration: "g āmu raizā hatsudō!!" (Japanese: Gアームライザー発動!!)	Takao Yoshizawa	Yukiyoshi Ohashi	September 16, 1991
33	"Showdown! Getter vs Yuji"; Transliteration: "taiketsu! gettā vs yūji" (Japanese: 対決!ゲッターVS由自)	Takenori Kawada	Shoji Tonoike	September 23, 1991
34	"Fear! Forbidden Water"; Transliteration: "kyōfu!! kindan no kaiiki" (Japanese: 恐怖!!禁断の海域)	Toru Yamada	Hiroyuki Hoshiyama	September 30, 1991
35	"The Typhoon Metal Beast"; Transliteration: "taifū metaru bīsuto" (Japanese: 台風メタルビースト)	Hiroki Shibata	Yukiyoshi Ohashi	October 7, 1991
36	"The Deprived Steel Blade"; Transliteration: "ubawa reta ji kō tsurugi (sōdo tomahōku)" (Japanese: 奪われた磁鋼剣(ソードトマホーク))	Masayuki Akechi	Shoji Tonoike	October 14, 1991
37	"Blue Mongolian Wolf"; Transliteration: "mongoru no aoki ōkami" (Japanese: モンゴルの青き狼)	Takao Yoshizawa	Junki Takegami	October 21, 1991
38	"Narukiss's Floating Fortress (Part One)"; Transliteration: "narukisu fuyū yōsai (zenpen)" (Japanese: ナルキス浮遊要塞(前編))	Takenori Kawada	Hiroyuki Hoshiyama	October 28, 1991
39	"Narukiss's Floating Fortress (Part Two)"; Transliteration: "narukisu fuyū yōsai (kōhen)" (Japanese: ナルキス浮遊要塞(後編))	Toru Yamada	Hiroyuki Hoshiyama	November 4, 1991
40	"Rescue Getter 1"; Transliteration: "gettā 1 o kyūshutsu seyo" (Japanese: ゲッター1を救出せよ)	Hiroki Shibata	Yukiyoshi Ohashi	November 11, 1991
41	"Escape from the Gravity Trap"; Transliteration: "jūryoku no wana karano dasshutsu" (Japanese: 重力の罠からの脱出)	Yoshikata Nitta	Katsuhiko Chiba	November 18, 1991
42	"Runaway! Metal Beast"; Transliteration: "bousō! metaru bīsuto" (Japanese: 暴走!メタルビースト)	Masayuki Akechi	Shoji Tonoike	November 25, 1991
43	"Yasha's Death in a Green Land"; Transliteration: "yasha, midori no chi ni shisu" (Japanese: ヤシャ,緑の地に死す)	Takao Yoshizawa	Junki Takegami	December 2, 1991
44	"Rebellion of the Greek Gods"; Transliteration: "girisha no kamigami no hanran" (Japanese: ギリシャの神々の反乱)	Takenori Kawada	Yukiyoshi Ohashi	December 9, 1991
45	"Emperor Landou Disappears?"; Transliteration: "teiō randō shōmetsu su !?" (Japanese: 帝王ランドウ消滅す!?)	Toru Yamada	Hiroyuki Hoshiyama	December 16, 1991
46	"Narukiss, a New Challenge"; Transliteration: "narukisu, arata naru chōsen" (Japanese: ナルキス,新たなる挑戦)	Hiroki Shibata	Katsuhiko Chiba	December 23, 1991
47	"UN Resolution to Surrender!!"; Transliteration: "kokuren ketsugi kōfuku seyo!!" (Japanese: 国連決議・降伏せよ!!)	Yoshikata Nitta	Shoji Tonoike	January 6, 1992
48	"Assault! 4 Warriors"; Transliteration: "totsugeki!! 4 nin no senshi" (Japanese: 突撃!!4人の戦士)	Masayuki Akechi	Yukiyoshi Ohashi	January 13, 1992
49	"Wonder! Revival of the Emperor"; Transliteration: "kyōi!! jatei fukkatsu" (Japanese: 驚異!!邪帝復活)	Takao Yoshizawa	Junki Takegami	January 20, 1992
50	"Getter, Rest Eternal"; Transliteration: "gettā yo eien ni nemure" (Japanese: ゲッターよ永遠に眠れ)	Hiroki Shibata	Hiroyuki Hoshiyama	January 27, 1992

=== Staff and production notes ===
- Airtime: Monday, 18:30-19:00
- Network: TV Setouchi, TV Tokyo
- Production: TV Setouchi, BigWest, Toei Company
- Animation studio: Toei Animation
- Planning: Yoshimasa Onishi (BigWest), Kenji Yokoyama (Toei)
- Planning cooperation: Dynamic Planning
- Producer: Chiyo Okazaki (TV Setouchi), Tatsuya Yoshida (Toei)
- Original work: Go Nagai, Ken Ishikawa
- Music: Michiaki Watanabe
- Chief animation director: Joji Oshima
- Series director: Hiroki Shibata
- Series composition: Hiroyuki Hoshiyama
- Script: Hiroyuki Hoshiyama, Yukiyoshi Ohashi, Junki Takegami, Shoji Tonoike, Katsuhiko Chiba
- Episode direction: Hiroki Shibata, Toru Yamada, Yoshikata Nitta, Masayuki Akechi, Takao Yoshizawa, Takenori Kawada
- Animation supervisor: Joji Oshima, Yuji Hakamada, Takahiro Kagami, Keiichi Sato, Joji Kikuchi, Seiya Nakahira, Takashi Nashizawa, Satoru Minowa, Masahiko Okura
- Art: Shinzo Ko, Kayoko Koitabashi, Masazumi Matsumiya, Ryu Tomamura

The anime is a remake of the original Getter Robo series with no real relationship with the previous anime or manga. Each episode features a different metal beast enemy, a similar format to the anime television series Mazinger Z. The design of the Getter Robo has some features reminiscent of Mazinger Z, such as a "Rocket Punch" attack. The series also marked the renewal of business relationships between Toei Animation and Go Nagai, which were interrupted by the conflict with Daiku Maryu Gaiking.

==== Theme songs ====
- Opening 1: 21st century boy (21世紀少年 (21st century boy), 21 seiki shōnen (21st century boy)) (lyrics by Bun Onoe, composition by Daiji Okai, arrangement by Hiroshi Toyama & Daiji Okai, song by Hiroyuki Takami)
- Ending 1: Grievous Rain (lyrics by Bun Onoe, composition by Daiji Okai, arrangement by Hiroshi Toyama, song by Hiroyuki Takami)
- Opening 2: Getter Robo Go (ゲッターロボ號, gettā robo gō) (lyrics by Kang Jin-hwa, composition & arrangement by Michiaki Watanabe, song by Ichiro Mizuki, chorus by Mori no Ki Jidogasshodan (森の木児童合唱団))
- Ending 2: Tomodachi ni Naritai (友だちになりたい) (lyrics by Kang Jin-hwa, composition & arrangement by Michiaki Watanabe, song by Ichiro Mizuki)

== Media ==
=== Home video ===
The series was released on Laserdisc by Toei Video. Toei also released the series on DVD:

Vol.	Discs	Standard number	Release date
1	2	DSTD-7211	April 21, 2006
2	2	DSTD-7212	May 21, 2006
3	2	DSTD-7213	June 21, 2006
4	2	DSTD-7214	July 21, 2006
5	2	DSTD-7215	August 4, 2006

=== Music ===
The opening and ending themes have been released as singles and have been compiled in albums of the artists who performed them. The soundtrack is available in two CDs, one of which was re-released years later,

Title	Type	Artist	Label	Standard number	Release date
Grievous Rain	8 cm single	Hiroyuki Takami	Bandai	BCDA-9	March 5, 1991
Getter Robo Go	8 cm single	Ichiro Mizuki	Columbia	CODC-8760	May 21, 1991
Getter Robo Go Ongakushu	Soundtrack album	Michiaki Watanabe	Columbia	COCC-7702	July 1, 1991
Getter Robo Go hit Kyokushu	Album	Various	Columbia	COCC-9122	October 1, 1991
Animex 1200 series 73: Getter Robo Go Ongakushu	Soundtrack album	Michiaki Watanabe	Columbia	COCC-72073	September 22, 2004

The opening and ending themes are available in several compilation albums of the Getter Robo series.

=== Manga ===
Three manga versions were published with the release of the TV series. Two of them were drawn by Tatsuo Yasuda, the first one was published in the magazine TV-kun from December 28, 1990 to April 30, 1991 and the chapters have been collected into a single volume. The second one was published in the magazine Bessatsu Coro Coro Comic Special from February 1991 to June 1991 and the chapters have been collected into a single volume too. Both of these versions were published by Shogakukan.

Another version, written and illustrated by Ken Ishikawa under the supervision of Go Nagai, was published in the magazine Shōnen Captain, published by Tokuma Shoten, from February 1991 to May 1993. This version was originally compiled in 7 volumes, and later reprinted in other collections published by Daitosha (5 volumes) and Futabasha (3 volumes).

No.	Release date	ISBN
1	June 1991	4-19-831070-X
2	November 1991	4-19-831120-X
3	February 1992	4-19-832030-6
4	September 1992	4-19-832101-9
5	January 1993	4-19-833021-2
6	March 1993	4-19-833041-7
7	May 1993	4-19-833060-3

From this manga, the first stories were published in the United States by Viz Media in 1993 in 7 issues (not volumes) under the name Venger Robo.

Some of these numbers were also published in Spain by Planeta DeAgostini in 1995, under the name Venger Robot Go. In France, the series was published from 1999 to 2001 for a total of 5 volumes by Dynamic Vision. A volume of the series was also published in South Korea by Seoul Cultural Publishers. In Italy, the series was published integrally as part of the Getter Saga series, which included all Getter Robot series in a single series of 12 volumes. There are a lot of major differences between Ken Ishikawa's version and the TV version. The whole plot is rewritten to match as the sequel to the last series, Getter Robo G as well as incorporating characters and storyline that would later be adapted in the OAVs Getter Robo Armageddon and Shin Getter Robo vs Neo Getter Robo. Another interesting thing is the debut of the iconic Shin Getter Robo in the Manga's 5th volume.

==== Manga plot ====
Sixteen years after Ryouma Nagare, Hayato Jin and Benkei Kuruma defeated the Hundred Oni Empire (百鬼帝国, Hyakki Teikoku), research has begun to develop a new set of Getter Machines in order to fight the threat of a new, cyborg-like species known as Metal Beasts, led by the evil Professor Rando of the "Vega Zone". Leading this project is Hayato himself, who soon scouts and enlists three young pilots: Go Ichimonji, a young professional athlete, Sho Tachibana, the daughter of Prof. Tachibana (leader of the Getter-Go project) and a skilled sword-fighter, and Gai Daidou, a former Getter mechanic. Together, these three pilots use a new set of Getter Machines to form the super robot known as "Getter Robo Go", and begin a battle to stop Rando once and for all.

==== Manga exclusive characters ====
- Hayato Jin (神隼 人)
- Ryoma Nagare (流 竜馬)
- Kei Minamikaze (南風渓)
- Schwartz Koff (シュワルツ・コフ)
- Messiah Tahir (メシア・タイール)
- Empress Jatego (女帝ジャテーゴ)
