= Pro-Wres no Hoshi Aztecaser =

- LDs packages showing the Aztecaser romanization
- Also known as: Pro-Wrestling Star Aztekaiser
- Genre: Tokusatsu, Action, Martial Arts, Pro-Wrestling
- Created by: Go Nagai; Ken Ishikawa
- Developed by: Bunzo Wakatsuki
- Directed by: Kiyosumi Fukazawa
- Starring: Miki Shimamura; Futoshi Kikuchi; Tadayoshi Kura; Akira Oizumi; Rika Yazaki; Takumi Usuda; Shouhei Yamamoto; Asao Matsumoto; Antonio Inoki
- Voices of: Joji Yanami
- Narrated by: Toshio Furukawa
- Theme music composer: Toshiaki Tsushima
- Composer: Toshiaki Tsushima
- Country of origin: Japan
- Original language: Japanese
- No. of seasons: 1
- No. of episodes: 26

Production
- Producer: Akira Kitsu
- Running time: 22-26 minutes
- Production company: Tsuburaya Productions

Original release
- Network: NET (now TV Asahi)
- Release: October 7, 1976 – March 31, 1977

Pro-Wres no Hoshi Aztecaser (プロレスの星 アステカイザー, Puroresu no Hoshi Asutekaizā; officially romanized as Aztecaser and translated as Pro-Wrestling Star Aztecaser) also known as Pro-Wrestling Star Aztekaiser is a Japanese pro-wrestling-themed tokusatsu/anime superhero television series produced by Tsuburaya Productions, and created by Go Nagai and Ken Ishikawa. Nagai and Ishikawa created three manga series, simply named Aztecaser (アステカイザー, asutekaizā), published in different magazines by Shogakukan. None of them are related between them or the TV show. They were compiled in a single tankōbon in 1978 (Futabasha), 1986 (Asahi Sonorama) and 2001 (Futabasha).

This primarily live-action series is unique, in that, during each climactic battle with the weekly demonic menace, the titular wrestling superhero is able to transform his entire live-action surroundings into anime footage, enabling him to perform superhuman wrestling techniques that are otherwise impossible to perform in live-action.

== See also ==
- List of professional wrestling television series
