= Getter Robo Hien: The Earth Suicide =

Japanese manga series

- Getter Robo Hien: The Earth suicide
- Cover of the printed volume 2 (2008)

ゲッターロボ飛焔 〜THE EARTH SUICIDE〜 (Gettā Robo Hien ~Ji Āsu Sūsaido~)
- Genre: Mecha
- Created by: Ken Ishikawa; Go Nagai
- Manga
- Written by: Naoto Tsushima
- Published by: Gentosha Comics
- Magazine: Webcomic Magna
- Original run: September 2007 – December 2008
- Volumes: 3

Getter Robo Hien ~THE EARTH SUICIDE~ (ゲッターロボ飛焔 〜THE EARTH SUICIDE〜, Gettā Robo Hien ~Ji Āsu Sūsaido~) is a Japanese manga created by Naoto Tsushima. It was a monthly serialized super robot manga continuing the Getter Robo mythos by way of the titular Getter Robo Hien. A total of 15 chapters were published the 28th of every month in Magna, a low-resolution free webcomic, only to be printed in higher quality in tankōbon volumes collecting five chapters each.

== Plot ==
Taking place after Getter Robo Go and before Getter Ark, The series features an older Hayato, one of the original pilots of Getter Robo, who leads a new team of 3 youngsters who pilot a new machine: Getter Robo Hien. Together, they face an army of plant monsters led by evil Professor Jacov. Jacov seeks to eradicate all human life, because he believes plants are the rightful heirs to the Earth because getter rays influenced their evolution long before humans even existed.

== Characters ==
=== Saotome Research Institute ===
- Hayato Jin (神隼人, Jin Hayato)

The Head of the Saotome Institute and ex-pilot of Getter. He currently manages the institute after Prof. Saotome's disappearance.

==== Getter Team ====
- Tsurugi Ryuga (竜牙剣, Ryūga Tsurugi)

Pilot of Getter Hien 1, he is the only survivor of D-City when his father and the friend were killed from the mysterious plant attacks. It excels in mechanic's manipulation, and it has the ability to turn parts of its body willingly into firearm-like weapons. The one's first campaign was decorated with mastering the control method of the first machine taken for the first time only by looking over the manual data for a short time, and subjugating father's enmity. He was then trained for a week and permanently became the main member of the Getter Team.

- Dan Amakusa (天草弾, Amakusa Dan)

Pilot of Getter Hien 2, the Jakofu killed her parents. Her white hair is from the shock of losing her parents at such a young age. They died right before her very eyes.

- Goki Hagane (鋼轟鬼, Hagane Gōki)

Pilot of Getter Hien 3.

=== American Army ===
- Rosario (ロザリオ, Rozario): Excalibur's Main Pilot.

=== Enemies ===
- Professor Jacov (プロフェッサー ジャコフ, Purofessā Jakofu): A mad scientist focused on world conquest.he seems to know when his creatures are killed.
- Manius Jacov (マニウス·ジャコフ, Maniusu Jakofu): Professor Jacov's son.

== Mechanics ==
=== Getter Robo Hien ===
==== Getter 1 ====
- Attacks
  - Getter Tomahawk: A gigantic twin-bladed axe, and Getter-1's main melee weapon.
  - Plasma Nova: A giant plasma beam from the twin cannons inside Getter-1's shoulders.

==== Getter 2 ====
- Attacks
  - Getter Drill

==== Getter 3 ====
- Attacks
  - Napalm Rain: Getter-3 launches an endless flurry of missiles launched from his arms, fingers, and many other spots.
  - Roaring Destruction of Heaven and Earth (天地轟橋, Tenchi Gōkai):

=== Excalibur ===
Excalibur (エクスカリバー, Ekusukaribā) is a Super Robot from the United States. It has an aerodynamic form and a humanoid form.

==== Humanoid form ====
- Attacks
  - Justice: the Statue of Liberty changes form and becomes a giant beam cannon wielded by Excalibur.
  - Maximum Thunder:

=== Excalibur II ===
Excalibur II (エクスカリバーII, Ekusukaribā II) is a Super Robot from the United States. It has an aerodynamic form and a humanoid form.

==== Humanoid form ====
- Attacks
  - Cross Judgement:
