= Getter Robo Arc =

Manga series (2001–2003)

- Cover of the Manga's first tankōbon volume

ゲッターロボ アーク (Gettā Robo Āku)
- Genre: Mecha
- Created by: Go Nagai; Ken Ishikawa
- Manga
- Written by: Ken Ishikawa
- Published by: Futabasha
- Magazine: Super Robot Magazine
- Original run: July 19, 2001 – September 19, 2003
- Volumes: 3
- Anime television series
- Directed by: Jun Kawagoe
- Written by: Tadashi Hayakawa
- Music by: Yoshichika Kuriyama; Shiho Terada
- Studio: Bee Media; Studio A-Cat
- Licensed by: Sentai Filmworks: SA/SEA: Medialink
- Original network: AT-X, Tokyo MX, BS SkyPer!, BS11
- Original run: July 4, 2021 – September 26, 2021
- Episodes: 13

Getter Robo Arc (Japanese: ゲッターロボ アーク, Hepburn: Gettā Robo Āku; pronounced also as "Āḥ" from the Sanskrit in the title) is a manga series written and illustrated by Ken Ishikawa based on Getter Robo franchise created by Ishikawa and Go Nagai. It was first serialized in Futabasha's Super Robot Magazine from July 19, 2001, to September 19, 2003, compiling into three tankōbon volumes (two aizōban volumes by Futabasha) until its premature cancellation. Taking place 10 years after both Shin Getter Robo and Getter Robo Go, it follows a new Getter Team led by Hayato to stop the invasion of the Andromeda Stellaration from invading Earth using the new mecha, Getter Robo Arc. An anime television series adaptation by Bee Media and Studio A-Cat aired from July to September 2021.

== Plot ==
Nineteen years after Ryoma Nagare, Go Ichimonji and Messiah Tyr left Earth in the Shin Getter 1 to Mars, (Note: In the manga version, the story takes place 10 years after Ryoma Nagare, Go Ichimonji and Messiah Tyr left Earth in the Shin Getter 1 to Mars, but in the anime version, the story takes place 19 years later.) the world is recovering from a previous conflict that almost changed the planet forever. Upon that time, the conflict between Earth and an unknown entity known as the Andromeda Stellaration is escalating as swarms of technorganic insect-like aliens almost brought the planet to its knees. However the Saotome Institute, now under the command of Hayato Jin, is doing its best to repel the enemy while training new pilots for protecting Earth against extraterrestrial threats both from within and beyond the planet. All for to pilot a new Getter unit meant as the final legacy of Professor Saotome: Getter Robo Arc.

In the midst of the conflict, Takuma Nagare, a teenage boy and the only son of Ryoma is searching for answers about his own legacy guided by his friend Baku Yamagishi. During a battle between a metal beast and the Saotome Institute's Getter Team, Takuma and Baku hijacked a fallen Getter D2 after its pilot has died. Much to the dismay and curiosity of Hayato, he sent the Getter Arc piloted by Sho Kamui to assist Takuma on defeating the metal beast and was brought in to the institute. Seeing Takuma and Baku's potentials, Hayato assigned both alongside Sho to operate Getter Robo Arc as humanity's last hope against the Andromeda Stellaration to protect humanity from its own extinction.

== Characters ==
=== Saotome Institute ===
Takuma Nagare (流拓馬, Nagare Takuma)
Voiced by: Yuma Uchida (Japanese); Andrew Love (English)
A 19-year-old boy and the only son of Ryoma Nagare, one of the original Getter Team pilots. During his childhood, his mother was killed by scientists who visited their home. Now searching for answers, he partnered up with Baku to go to the Saotome Institute to learn about his lineage. Both brash but intelligent, he also inherits Ryoma's DNA, which gives him exceptional stamina and strength as well as superb regenerative capabilities. He is also shown not to like flashy weapons like his father, as he only uses a Revolver. As a Getter pilot, Takuma pilots the Getter Arc, which focuses on both power and close combat.
Sho Kamui (カムイ・ショウ, Kamui Shō)
Voiced by: Arimaro Mukaino (Japanese); Scott Gibbs (English)
A 19-year-old Human-Dinosaur hybrid. Sho is the only son of Emperor Gore, the former ruler of the Dinosaur Empire. He was born from a human mother that Gore had kidnapped years ago, but despite all of that, she cared for him as her only child. He has a calm personality and is unrivaled in cold blood. Due to how he was born, his physical ability far exceeds that of ordinary human beings and can endure Getter Ray radiation. His strength also allows him to deliver punches that are five times more powerful than ordinary humans. Also, due to his relation to the Dinosaur Empire, he is right to succeed his half-brother Emperor Gore III to the throne. Hayato, seeing his strengths, decided to accept him to the Saotome Institute after a truce between them and the Empire to take down the Andromeda Stellaration. As a Getter pilot, Sho pilots the Getter Kirik, which focuses mainly on speed.
Baku Yamagishi (山岸獏, Yamagishi Baku)
Voiced by: Kazuhiro Sunseki (Japanese); Joe Daniels (English)
A 22-year-old Zen Buddhist monk, Baku was the younger brother of Messiah Tyr. He is supportive of the younger Takuma in finding answers to his origins. He also has a good ability to sense Getter Rays while being good at electronics, especially in hacking several systems. As a Getter pilot, Baku pilots the Getter Khan, which focuses mainly on defense.
Hayato Jin (神隼人, Jin Hayato)
Voiced by: Naoya Uchida (Japanese); Justin Doran (English)
One of the original three Getter Pilots and current head of the Saotome Institute. He has retired from piloting Getter Robo after his body started to lag behind him and the events that occurred 19 years ago. He also served as Kamui's stepfather while being taken in by the institute.
Shikishima (敷島, Shikishima)
Voiced by: Yōhei Tadano (Japanese); Greg Ayres (English)
A close friend of Professor Saotome and lead researcher in the Saotome Institute. He is kooky and rather unpredictable, yet his smarts contributed to the institute's progress in Getter Ray research. He knew Takuma very well due to his relation to his father.
Igari (伊賀利, Igari)
Voiced by: Mitsuo Iwata (Japanese); Cody Edgar (English)
The major sergeant who trains both the Arc and D2 teams. He is also once a Getter pilot who commands Shin Getter-3 during the events of Shin Getter Robo when the Andromeda Stellaration started investigating Earth and coordinating their attacks in the Saotome Institute.
Captain Hoshi (星一尉, Hoshi Ichii)
Voiced by: Chihiro Nishimori
One of the pilots of Getter D2 who had died during an attack against the Andromeda Stellaration.
Ryoma Nagare (流竜馬, Nagare Ryōma)
Voiced by: Hideo Ishikawa (Japanese); Adam Gibbs (English)
The original pilot of the Getter 1 and leader of the former Getter Team, alongside Hayato and Benkei. During the Andromeda Stellaration's attack in the Saotome Institute, he piloted the Shin Getter-1 to repel the first attack but never prevented Benkei's death after Getter Dragon destroyed the former part of the institute. He soon became one with the Getter Rays after his body fusing with Shin Getter-1 and left Earth for Mars.
Benkei Kuruma (車弁慶, Kuruma Benkei)
Voiced by: Kiyoyuki Yanada
One of the original pilots of Getter Robo, commanding Getter Poseidon and Shin Getter-3. He used the Getter Dragon to destroy the bugs that invaded the lab. But the sheer power inside Dragon killed him alongside Professor Saotome and some researchers in the institute, becoming one with the Getter Rays. With his spirit lingering inside Getter Dragon, he had finally found peace after the spirit of Professor Saotome told him to move on and let the new generation take care of future threats.
Professor Saotome (早乙女博士, Saotome Hakase)
Voiced by: Takayuki Sugō
The founder of the Saotome Institute, who did research on Getter Rays and created several Getter Robo units to protect Earth from existential threats. He died during the Andromeda Stellaration's attack on the institute when Benkei overloaded the Getter Dragon and destroyed the place.
Go Ichimonji (一文字號, Ichimonji Go)
Voiced by: Takahiro Sakurai
The leader of the Go Team, piloting the Getter Go. In the events prior to the series, he boarded the Shin Getter-1 until he became one with it alongside Ryoma and Messiah. A clone of him was later dispatched to Earth by the Getter Corps, piloting the Shin Getter Robo Tarak (真ゲッターロボ タラク, Shin Gettā Robo Taraku) to protect the planet against the Andromeda Stellaration's ongoing invasion.

=== Allied Forces ===
Sho Tachibana (橘翔, Tachibana Shou)
Voiced by: Yū Asakawa (Japanese); Patricia Duran (English)
The former member of the Go Team and pilot of Getter Sho, Sho is a retired pilot who leads the Allied Forces against the Andromeda Stellaration.
Schwarzkopf (シュワルツコフ, Shuwarutsukofu)
Voiced by: Kunihiko Yasui
A former pilot in the US Army Forces in Getter Robo Go and admiral in the Allied Forces.
Ron Schweitzer (ロン・シュヴァイツァ, Ron Shuvaitsa)
Voiced by: Daisuke Ono (Japanese); Bryson Baugus (English)

=== Dinosaur Empire ===
Emperor Gore (皇帝ゴール, Kōtei Gōru)
Voiced by: N/A
The former leader of the Dinosaur Empire, and the late father of Sho Kamui and Emperor Gore the 3rd. He was killed by Emperor Burai near the end of the original Getter Robo story. He appears in episode four of the anime as a ghost.
Emperor Gore the 3rd (皇帝ゴール三世, Kōtei Gōru San-sei)
Voiced by: Ryōtarō Okiayu (Japanese); Mark Mendelsohn (English)
The current leader of the Dinosaur Empire, he is the successor to the former leader Emperor Gore. He is also Kamui's half brother, who does not really trust humans despite his faction calling a truce with the Saotome Institute during the invasion of the Andromeda Stellaration. Despite his position, his mindset was plagued with fear due to Kamui's approval to the people of the empire.
Professor Han (ハン博士, Han Hakase)
Voiced by: Kenichi Ogata (Japanese); John Gremillion (English)
A close adviser and scientist of the Dinosaur Empire, who became Kamui's surrogate father after his mother was held hostage by the empire and Emperor Gore was killed. He is one of the few people who knew Kamui's true legacy and despite being a scientist, he is a very kind person. He developed the Getter Saurus, a replica Getter using technology from the Saotome Institute's research on Getter Rays and expertise on Mechasaurus development.
General Bat (バット将軍, Batto Shōgun)
Voiced by: Norio Wakamoto
The general and military adviser to Emperor Gore, who had various battles with the Getter Robo. He is now retired and suffering from dementia.
Vise (バイス, Baisu), Ganryu (ガンリュー, Ganryū) and Gozuro (ゴズロ, Gozuro)
Voiced by: Ryousuke Takahashi (Vise), Akihiro Sakata (Ganryu), Chihiro Nishimori (Gozuro) (Japanese); Cody House (Vise), James Marler (Ganryu), Jeremy Gee (Gozuro) (English)
Kamui's childhood friends who all belong to the Ryu Clan, one of the lower class of the Saurian races. They all became pilots for Getter Saurus 19 years later. In the manga, their physical designs were different compared to how they look in the anime. Their names were also different in the manga, Vise was originally named Zor, while Ganryu and Gozuro were nameless.
Campania (カンパニア, Kanpania)
Voiced by: Takahiro Fujii
General Basilisk (バジリスク将軍, Bajirisuku shōgun)
Voiced by: Mitsuo Iwata

=== Andromeda Stellaration ===
Queen Meldousa (大女王メルドウサ, Daijoō Merudousa)
Voiced by: Romi Park
The leader of the Andromeda Stellaration, who had orchestrated several attacks on Earth due to their relation to Getter Rays. She is only mentioned in the manga, while in the anime, her appearance is shown in a hologram during her interactions with Komei.
Zhuge Liang (諸葛孔明 (コーメイ), Shokatsu Kōmei)
Voiced by: Takaya Hashi
The senior general in the Andromeda Stellaration, who has coordinating several attacks in the Saotome Institute in order to destroy it and the link to Getter Rays.
Carter McDonald (カーター・マクドナル, Kātā Makudonaru)
Voiced by: Fumihiko Tachiki
An American scientist who works with Andromeda Stellaration, responsible for the death of Ryoma Nagare's wife when he and his group were on search to seize Takuma 19 years ago. He is in fact a survivor of the Hundred Oni Empire after the group was defeated at the hands of Getter Dragon.
Toenko (兎猿猴, Toenkō)
Voiced by: Hiroyuki Honda
A warrior sent by the Andromeda Stellaration to lead an army of insector robots to attack the Saotome Institute. He dresses in Chinese style warrior armor, and his name is derived from the Japanese words for Rabbit and Monkey. His design, characteristics and abilities also appear to be based on the legendary Chinese Monkey King (also known as Sun Wukong or Son Goku). He appears in episode 3 of the Anime.

=== Hundred Oni Empire ===
Emperor Burai (ブライ大帝, Burai Taitei)
Voiced by: Uncredited Voice Actor
The emperor of the Hundred Oni Empire (Hyakki Empire) who was killed at the end of Getter Robo G. He is seen in a flashback in episode 6.

=== Getter Corps ===
Musashi Tomoe (巴武蔵, Tomoe Musashi)
Voiced by: Shinpachi Tsuji
A clone of the original Musashi Tomoe, who was one of the original getter pilots until his death. His clone was based on the memories inside Getter Emperor and was sent to Earth as a commander of the Getter Corps.

=== Others ===
Ryō Nagare (流りょう, Nagare Ryō)
Voiced by: Sumi Shimamoto
Ryoma's wife and also Takuma's mother, who was murdered by Carter McDonald after he invaded her dojo 19 years ago.
Messiah Tyr (メシア・タイール, Meshia Taīru)
Voiced by: Nozomu Sasaki
The leader of the Green Earth cult and also Baku's older brother. 19 years ago during the Andromeda Stellaration's invasion of Earth, he became one with the Getter Rays after his body fusing with Shin Getter-1 and left Earth for Mars.
Kamui's Mother (カムイの母, Kamui no Haha)
Voiced by: Fumino Hase
Yamazaki (山崎, Yamazaki)
Voiced by: Miho Masaka
A former fiance of Hayato and self-defense force member who took part in the war against Professor Rando years ago during the events of Getter Robo Go and served as a second lieutenant. She died in an explosion after trying to defuse one of the bombs that Rando had planted in every country all over the world.

== Media ==
=== Manga ===
Getter Robo Arc was both written and drawn by Ken Ishikawa. Created as the third installment of the Getter Robo series after Getter Robo Go, it was serialized in Futabasha's Super Robot Magazine from July 19, 2001, to September 19, 2003. However, after all three volumes were published and "part 1" of the series has wrapped up, Ishikawa died on November 17, 2006, leaving the rest of the story unfinished. Futabasha later republished the manga in 2007 in an Aizoban edition and later in 2016 in a limited Kanzenban edition.

No.	Release date	ISBN
1	June 12, 2002	978-4-57-593786-2
2	May 28, 2003	978-4-57-593833-3
3	May 12, 2004	978-4-57-593893-7

=== Anime ===
An anime television series adaptation produced by Bee Media and Studio A-Cat was announced by Bandai Namco Entertainment on November 2, 2020, and aired from July 4 to September 26, 2021, on AT-X, Tokyo MX, BS SkyPer! and BS11. Jun Kawagoe is directing the series, with Tadashi Hayakawa as writer and music composed by both Yoshichika Kuriyama and Shiho Terada. JAM Project performed both the series' opening theme song "Bloodlines ~Unmei no Ketto~" (Bloodlines ~運命の血統~, Bloodlines ~Unmei no Kettō ~; "Bloodlines ~Fated Liniage~") and the series' ending themes: "Dragon 2021", "Storm 2021", "Heats 2021" and "Tomo yo" (戦友よ; "Comrade").

Medialink licensed the series for streaming in Asia and will stream the series through their Ani-One Asia YouTube channel on the same date as the series premiere in Japan. Sentai Filmworks also licensed the series for release outside of Asia, with the series streaming on Hidive on July 4, 2021, for the subbed version and August 14, 2021, for the English dubbed version.

==== Episode list ====
No.	Title	Directed by (Note: Information is taken from the ending credits of each episode.)	Storyboarded by	Animation directed by	Original release date
1	"The Demon on High"; Transliteration: "Ten no Oni" (Japanese: 天の鬼)	Jun Kawagoe	Jun Kawagoe	Hideyuki Motohashi, Chūji Nakajima, Hironori Hano	July 4, 2021
2	"The Children of Destiny"; Transliteration: "Sadame no Kora" (Japanese: 運命の子ら)	Naoki Ōhira	Tsū²	Hidekazu Yamana, Takayuki Chiba	July 11, 2021
3	"The Arc Activates"; Transliteration: "Āku Shidō" (Japanese: アーク始動)	Kaoru Yabana, Jin Keyi	Tsū³ Etsū	Gaku Bun Xu	July 18, 2021
4	"On a Gorgeous Night"; Transliteration: "Utsukushii Yoru ni" (Japanese: 美しい夜に)	Akihiro Nagao	Jun Kawagoe	Isamu Tsuki, Takurō Sakurai	July 25, 2021
5	"The Chosen Children"; Transliteration: "Mōshigo" (Japanese: 申し子)	Kaoru Yabana	Tsūkō	Gaku Bun Xu	August 1, 2021
6	"The Dragon's Descendant"; Transliteration: "Ryū no Matsuei" (Japanese: 竜の末裔)	Masashi Tsukino	Tsūkofu	Chūji Nakajima, Hironori Hano, Yoshio Usuda	August 8, 2021
7	"The Getter Coalition"; Transliteration: "Gettā Dōmei-gun" (Japanese: ゲッター同盟軍)	Naoki Ōhira	Naoki Ōhira	Hidekazu Yamana, Takayuki Chiba	August 15, 2021
8	"Blood of Dragons, Heart of Man"; Transliteration: "Ryū no Chi Hito no Kokoro" (Japanese: 竜の血 人の心)	Akihiro Nagao	Jun Kawagoe	Miyako Nishida, Isamu Utsuki	August 22, 2021
9	"Charge!!"; Transliteration: "Totsunyū!!" (Japanese: 突入!!)	Kaoru Yabana	Jun Kawagoe	Gaku Bun Xu	August 29, 2021
10	"The Interstellar Crusade"; Transliteration: "Isei no Seisen" (Japanese: 異星の聖戦)	Kentarō Mizuno	Naoki Ōhira	Chūji Nakajima, Hironori Hano, Yoshio Usuda	September 5, 2021
11	"Deep Desire"; Transliteration: "Shukugan" (Japanese: 宿願)	Michita Shiraishi	Naoki Ōhira	Kenji Hattori	September 12, 2021
12	"Overlapping Time"; Transliteration: "Orikasanaru Toki" (Japanese: 折り重なる刻)	Kaoru Yabana	Jun Kawagoe	Kenji Hattori, Gaku Bun Xu, Hidekazu Yamana, Takayuki Chiba	September 19, 2021
13	"The Never-ending Battle"; Transliteration: "Hateshinaki Tatakai" (Japanese: 果てしなき戦い)	Jun Kawagoe	Jun Kawagoe	Hidekazu Yamana, Takayuki Chiba, Kenji Hattori, Gaku Bun Xu	September 26, 2021
