= Ultraman (manga) =

Japanese manga series

- Cover of volume 1
- Genre: Science fiction; Superhero; Tokusatsu
- Created by: Tsuburaya Productions
- Manga
- Written by: Eiichi Shimizu
- Illustrated by: Tomohiro Shimoguchi
- Published by: Hero's Inc.
- English publisher: NA: Viz Media
- Magazine: Monthly Hero's (October 1, 2011 – October 30, 2020); Comiplex (November 27, 2020 – present)
- Original run: October 1, 2011 – present
- Volumes: 22
- Original net animation
- Directed by: Kenji Kamiyama; Shinji Aramaki; Hiroki Uchiyama (S2) (Note: Series Director (シリーズ監督))
- Produced by: Mitsuhisa Ishikawa; Joseph Chou
- Written by: Kurasumi Sunayama (S1); Harumi Doki (S1); Ryō Higaki (S1–2); Kento Shimoyama (S3)
- Music by: Nobuko Toda; Kazuma Jinnouchi
- Studio: Production I.G; Sola Digital Arts
- Licensed by: Netflix
- Released: April 1, 2019 – May 11, 2023
- Runtime: 23–25 minutes
- Episodes: 31
- icon

Ultraman (stylized in all caps) is a Japanese manga series written by Eiichi Shimizu and drawn by Tomohiro Shimoguchi of Linebarrels of Iron fame. It was published in Hero's Inc.'s Monthly Hero's magazine from October 2011 to October 2020, and was later transferred to the Comiplex website in November 2020. It is part of the Ultraman franchise and a manga sequel of the 1966 television series. The series has been collected in 22 tankōbon volumes as of November 2025.

A 3DCG original net animation (ONA) adaptation co-produced by Production I.G and Sola Digital Arts was released on Netflix in April 2019. A second season was released in April 2022. A third and final season was released in May 2023.

== Story ==
Decades have passed since the events of Ultraman, with the legendary "Giant of Light" (光の巨人, Hikari no Kyojin) now a memory, as it is believed he returned home after fighting the many giant aliens that invaded the Earth. Shin Hayata's son Shinjiro seems to possess a strange ability, and it is this ability, along with his father's revelation that he was Ultraman, that leads Shinjiro to battle the new aliens invading the Earth as the new Ultraman.

== Media ==
=== Manga ===
The series began serialization in the first issue of Monthly Hero's magazine, published on November 1, 2011. The magazine ceased publication on October 30, 2020, and the series was transferred to Comiplex website, starting publication on November 27 of that same year. The first collected tankōbon volume was published on September 8, 2012. As of November 5, 2025, 22 volumes have been released. In August 2025, it was announced that the manga would enter hiatus and is set to resume in Q2 2026 with its final story arc.

Viz Media licensed the series for English language release in North America in February 2015, and the first volume was released on August 18, 2015.

==== Volumes ====
No.	Original release date	Original ISBN	English release date	English ISBN
1	September 8, 2012	978-4-86468-301-2	August 18, 2015	978-1-4215-8182-8
2	March 5, 2013	978-4-86468-321-0	November 17, 2015	978-1-4215-8183-5
3	September 5, 2013	978-4-86468-341-8	February 16, 2016	978-1-4215-8184-2
4	March 5, 2014	978-4-86468-358-6	May 17, 2016	978-1-4215-8185-9
5	November 5, 2014	978-4-86468-378-4; 978-4-86468-377-7 (SE) (Note: This release is bundled with a soft vinyl figure of Shinjiro's Ultraman suit.)	August 16, 2016	978-1-4215-8186-6
6	July 4, 2015	978-4-86468-420-0	November 15, 2016	978-1-4215-8647-2
7	December 29, 2015	978-4-86468-422-4; 978-4-86468-423-1 (SE) (Note: This release is bundled with a soft vinyl figure of Moroboshi's Ultraman suit version 7.2.)	February 21, 2017	978-1-4215-9060-8
8	July 5, 2016	978-4-86468-301-2; 978-4-86468-466-8 (SE) (Note: This version is bundled with a DVD special and ULTRASINGLES. The DVD contains: Motion Comic Volume 1: Truth (実態, Jittai); Motion Comic Volume 2: Hokuto (北斗); Music Video: "Ultlove" (ウルトラブ, Urutorabu) by Maaya Uchida; Music Video: NO ONE KNOWS by Megumi Han)	May 16, 2017	978-1-4215-9272-5
9	December 29, 2016	978-4-86468-486-6	October 17, 2017	978-1-4215-9757-7
10	July 5, 2017	978-4-86468-507-8	May 15, 2018	978-1-9747-0044-8
11	December 5, 2017	978-4-86468-529-0	January 15, 2019	978-1-9747-0259-6
12	July 5, 2018	978-4-86468-537-5; 978-4-86468-538-2 (SE) (Note: This release is bundled with a soft vinyl figure of Shinjiro's Ultraman suit B-type.)	June 18, 2019	978-1-9747-0518-4
13	March 5, 2019	978-4-86468-624-2	April 21, 2020	978-1-9747-1055-3
14	November 5, 2019	978-4-86468-677-8	October 20, 2020	978-1-9747-1487-2
15	April 5, 2020	978-4-86468-716-4	April 20, 2021	978-1-9747-2012-5
16	December 4, 2020	978-4-86468-767-6	January 18, 2022	978-1-9747-2339-3
17	June 5, 2021	978-4-86468-809-3	August 16, 2022	978-1-9747-3000-1
18	April 5, 2022	978-4-86468-879-6	April 18, 2023	978-1-9747-3635-5
19	February 3, 2023	978-4-86468-154-4	January 16, 2024	978-1-9747-4297-4
20	February 5, 2024	978-4-86468-237-4	December 17, 2024	978-1-9747-4958-4
21	February 5, 2025	978-4-86805-045-2	February 17, 2026	978-1-9747-6160-9
22	November 5, 2025	978-4-86805-129-9	October 20, 2026	978-1-9747-6867-7

=== Motion comic ===
To celebrate the fourth volume of Ultraman, Monthly Hero's announced the launch of Motion Comic (モーションコミック, Mōshon Komikku) in March 2014, which features the manga itself being partially animated with colors and voice actors. The first release was all six chapters from Volume 1 of the manga, with Ryōhei Kimura was the first cast to be announced and voicing the main character Shinjiro Hayata. Soon, more casts were added as well while the Motion Comic in progress. Two special Motion Comics were bundled alongside a special release of Volume 8 of Ultraman manga alongside the ULTRASINGLES.

=== Discography ===
A single titled as ULTRASINGLES was released alongside the special release of Volume 8. The single contains three songs by Maaya Uchida, all of them were sung by her character, Rena Sayama, in the Motion Comic, with the lyrics provided by Eiichi Shimizu. The third single, "Ultlove", was first released in the official YouTube site of Monthly Hero's in late December 2015.

- Lovely Me
  - Composer: Tomokazu Tashiro (田代 智一, Tashiro Tomokazu)
- Authentic
  - Composer: Koji Igarashi (五十嵐広二, Igarashi Koji)
- Ultlove (ウルトラブ, Urutorabu)
  - Composer/Tsugaru-jamisen: Shinjiro "MANI" Sakamoto (坂本マニ真二郎, Sakamoto Mani Shinjirō)
  - Guitar Player: Eiichi Shimizu

=== Anime ===
An anime adaptation of the manga was announced in November 2017, which was later revealed to be a 3DCG anime co-produced by Production I.G and Sola Digital Arts. The anime was co-directed by Kenji Kamiyama and Shinji Aramaki and it was the 33rd series (3rd animated) in the Ultra Series. The music score was composed by Nobuko Toda and Kazuma Jinnouchi. The series was released on Netflix on April 1, 2019. Oldcodex performed the series' ending theme song "Sight Over The Battle."

During the 2019 Annecy International Animated Film Festival, Netflix announced that a second season is in production. The staff are returning to reprise their roles, with the addition of Hiroyuki Uchiyama as series director. A kickoff event for the second season occurred on August 24, 2021. Japanese voice actor Tatsuhisa Suzuki was originally announced to voice the new character, Kotaro Higashi, but eventually stepped down in August 2021 after he decided to suspend his activities in voice acting for the time being. Tomoaki Maeno replaced Suzuki for the role. The second season was released on April 14, 2022.

A third and final season was released on May 11, 2023.

==== Episodes ====
Series overview
Season	Episodes	Originally released
1	13	April 1, 2019
2	6	April 14, 2022
3	12	May 11, 2023

==== Season 1 (2019) ====
No. overall	No. in season	Title	Original release date
1	1	"A Power That Shouldn't Be On This Earth"; Transliteration: "Kono Chikyū ni Atte wa Naranai Chikara" (Japanese: この地球にあってはならない力)	April 1, 2019
2	2	"An Inescapable Fate"; Transliteration: "Nogare rarenai Unmei" (Japanese: 逃れられない運命)	April 1, 2019
3	3	"Being Ultraman Isn't Bad"; Transliteration: "Urutoraman Yaru no mo Warukunai kamo" (Japanese: ウルトラマンやるのも悪くないかも)	April 1, 2019
4	4	"Release the Limiter!"; Transliteration: "Rimittā Kaijo!" (Japanese: リミッター解除!)	April 1, 2019
5	5	"City of Aliens"; Transliteration: "Iseijin no Machi" (Japanese: 異星人の街)	April 1, 2019
6	6	"The Curse of Ultraman"; Transliteration: "Urutoraman to iu Noroi" (Japanese: ウルトラマンという呪い)	April 1, 2019
7	7	"Hidden Thoughts"; Transliteration: "Himerareta Omoi" (Japanese: 秘められた思い)	April 1, 2019
8	8	"The Beginning of Truth"; Transliteration: "Shinjitsu no Makuake" (Japanese: 真実の幕開け)	April 1, 2019
9	9	"Nice To Meet You, Brother"; Transliteration: "Hajimemashite, Nīsan" (Japanese: はじめまして、兄さん)	April 1, 2019
10	10	"Star Council"; Transliteration: "Seidan Hyōgi-kai" (Japanese: 星団評議会)	April 1, 2019
11	11	"You As You Are"; Transliteration: "Sono mama no Kimi de ite" (Japanese: そのままの君でいて)	April 1, 2019
12	12	"Ace Killer"; Transliteration: "Ēsu Kirā" (Japanese: エースキラー)	April 1, 2019
13	13	"A Real Ultraman"; Transliteration: "Hontō no Urutoraman" (Japanese: 本当のウルトラマン)	April 1, 2019

==== Season 2 (2022) ====
No. overall	No. in season	Title	Original release date
14	1	"The Man from NY"; Transliteration: "Nyūyōku kara kita otoko" (Japanese: NYから来た男)	April 14, 2022
15	2	"Flames of Fury"; Transliteration: "Fundo no Honō" (Japanese: 憤怒の炎)	April 14, 2022
16	3	"The Man without the Light"; Transliteration: "Ushinawareta Hikari" (Japanese: 失われた『光』)	April 14, 2022
17	4	"Attack on SSSP"; Transliteration: "Katoku-tai Kyūshū" (Japanese: 科特隊急襲)	April 14, 2022
18	5	"The Golden Fortress"; Transliteration: "Kogane no Jōsai" (Japanese: 黄金の城塞)	April 14, 2022
19	6	"Ultraman No.6"; Transliteration: "Roku-banme no Urutoraman" (Japanese: 六番目のULTRAMAN)	April 14, 2022

==== Season 3 (2023) ====
No. overall	No. in season	Title	Original release date
20	1	"The Sign of a New Awakening"; Transliteration: "Aratanaru Yochō" (Japanese: 新たなる予兆)	May 11, 2023
21	2	"The Curse of Ultraman"; Transliteration: "Oyako ni Furikakaru Noroi" (Japanese: 親子にふりかかる呪い)	May 11, 2023
22	3	"The Choice of a Hero"; Transliteration: "Hīrō to shite no Sentaku" (Japanese: ヒーローとしての選択)	May 11, 2023
23	4	"No One to Trust"; Transliteration: "Shinjite moraenainara, ore wa ichi-ri demo yaru" (Japanese: 信じてもらえないなら、俺は一人でもやる)	May 11, 2023
24	5	"Hide and Seek"; Transliteration: "Ou mono to owareru mono" (Japanese: 追うものと追われる者)	May 11, 2023
25	6	"A Warrior's Return"; Transliteration: "Rekisen no Yūshi" (Japanese: 歴戦の勇士)	May 11, 2023
26	7	"The Fourth Successor"; Transliteration: "Yo'ninme no Keishō-sha" (Japanese: 4人目の継承者)	May 11, 2023
27	8	"Taro vs Ultraman"	May 11, 2023
28	9	"Time of Awakening"; Transliteration: "Saranaru kakusei" (Japanese: 更なる覚醒)	May 11, 2023
29	10	"The Disaster"; Transliteration: "Shin no Yakusai" (Japanese: 真の厄災)	May 11, 2023
30	11	"A Nightmare Come True"; Transliteration: "Akumu no shōkan" (Japanese: 悪夢の召喚)	May 11, 2023
31	12	"Finale"; Transliteration: "Saraba, warera no..." (Japanese: さらば、我らの――)	May 11, 2023

== Video game ==
On January 10, 2020, an Ultraman mobile game based on the manga has been announced for released on iOS and Android devices. The game, titled Ultraman: Be Ultra, launched in early 2020 in Japan.

== Reception ==
In the week of June 29 to July 5, 2015, Japanese site Oricon revealed that the Volume 6 of Ultraman was placed at 33rd in a ranking with a total of estimated 26,214 sold copies. From July 6 to 12 of that year, Volume 6's selling was boosted to number with an estimated number of 73,673 copies. On December 28, 2015, to January 3, 2016, the Volume 7 of Ultraman was placed 20th rank with an estimated total of 43,969 copies. The ranking dropped to 38 in the week January 4–10 with a total of 68,100 copies. In the week of July 4–10, Volume 8 was ranked 20 with an estimated 41,077 sold. During the 2016 annual San Diego Comic-Con, Ultraman is ranked 5th in "Best New Manga for Kids/Teens". In early 2017, Volume 9 was ranked 24th with a total of 59,898 copies.

The manga sold over 2.4 million copies by 2017. As of 2018, the manga has sold more than 2.8 million copies.

Rebecca Silverman of the Anime News Network reviews volume 1 of the manga and praises Shinjiro for his plot involvements in the storyline, although highlighting that "the timeskip is a bit abrupt, as is Bemular's introduction".

== Merchandise ==
On April 30, 2016, a 1:1 scale FRP version of Dan Moroboshi/Ultraman Suit Version 7.2's Spacium Sword was announced to be released at August 2016 and pre-orders were made available at 55,000 Yen (59,400 Yen if tax is included) in Eikoh.

In October 2015, an articulated action figure of Shinjiro Hayata in his Ultraman Suit, which was made by a collaboration between Ultra Act (Tsuburaya's own figure line) and S.H. Figuarts. The figure is sold under the price of 6,840 Yen and pre-orders were made from October 23, 2015, while shipping started in May 2016. In 2016, Gecco Corp. produced a 1/6 scale diorama of Shinjiro Hayata in his Ultraman Suit, which has a removable head to switch between either Shinjiro or Ultraman Suit helmet. Another collaboration merchandise was made with Pioneer SE-MX9-K in releasing headphones themed after Shinjiro's Ultraman Suit helmet.

== See also ==
- Getter Robo Devolution, another manga series from the same creators
