= Kazuki Nakashima =

Japanese playwright, novelist and anime screenwriter

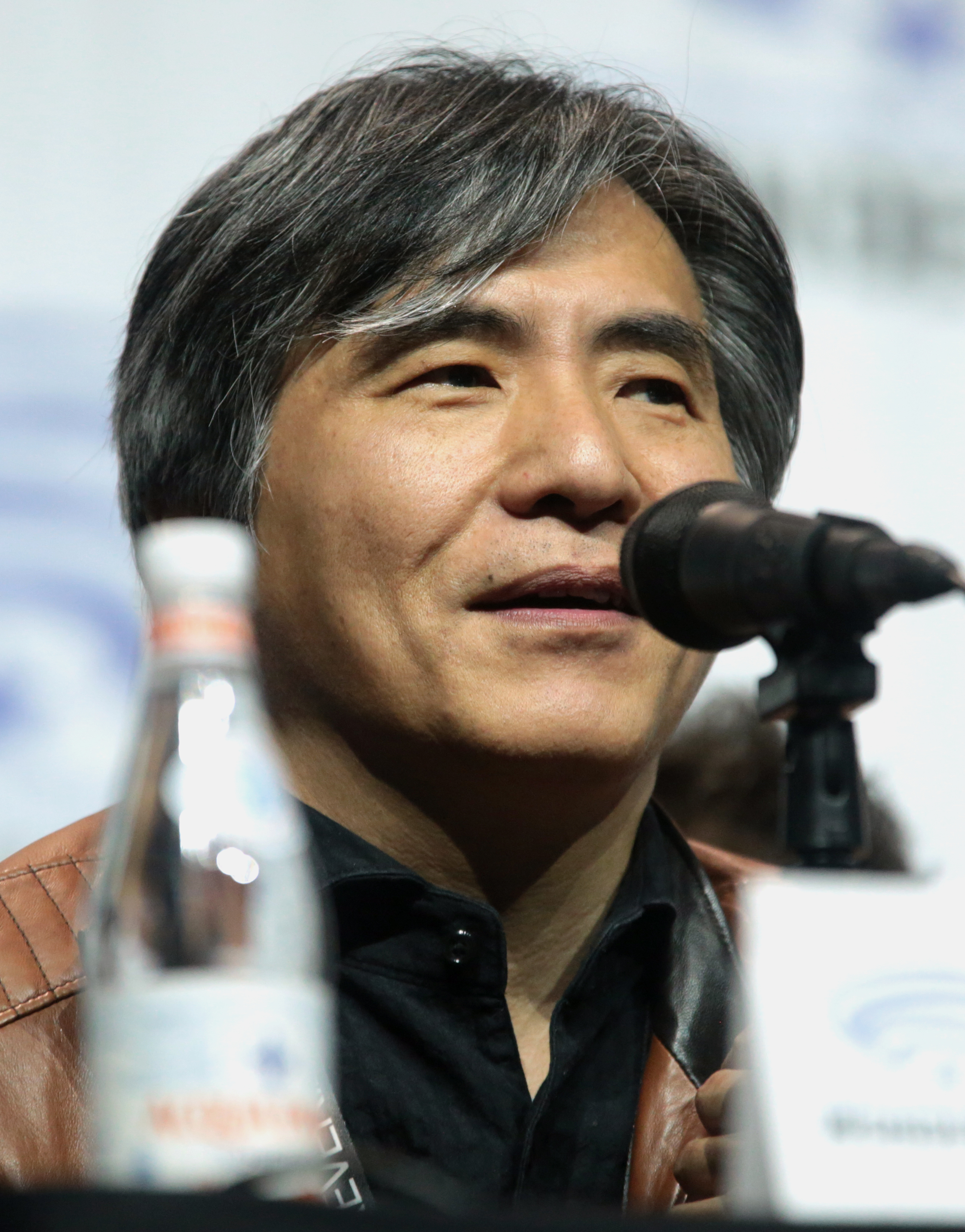
Nakashima in March 2018

Kazuki Nakashima (中島 かずき, Nakashima Kazuki; born August 19, 1959 in Fukuoka, Japan) is a Japanese playwright, novelist, contributing editor and screenwriter. In addition to working on Getter Robo, he is a fan of Ken Ishikawa.

== Screenwriting credits ==
=== Manga ===
- Getter Robo Saga (Editor)
- Kyomu Senki (Editor)

=== Novels ===
- Oh! Edo Rocket (2001)

=== Anime ===
Series head writer denoted in bold

- **Gurren Lagann** (2007)
- **Nodame Cantabile: Finale** (2010)
- **Kill la Kill** (2013-2014)
- Concrete Revolutio: The Last Song (2016)
- **BNA: Brand New Animal** (2020)
- **Back Arrow** (2021)

=== OVA ===
- **Re: Cutie Honey** (2004)

=== Anime films ===
- Gurren Lagann: Childhood's End (2008)
- Gurren Lagann: The Lights in the Sky are Stars (2009)
- Crayon Shin-chan: Intense Battle! Robo Dad Strikes Back (2014)
- Batman Ninja (2018)
- Promare (2019)
- Batman Ninja vs. Yakuza League (2025)

=== Live action television ===
Series head writer denoted in bold

- Ultraman Max (2006)
- Juken Sentai Gekiranger (2007)
- Kamen Rider W (2010)
- **Kamen Rider Fourze** (2011-2012)
- **Futagashira** (2015-2016)

=== Live action films ===
- Seven Souls in the Skull Castle (2004)
- Ashura (2005)
- Hidden Fortress: The Last Princess (2008)
- Kamen Rider × Kamen Rider Fourze & OOO: Movie War Mega Max (2011)
  - Beginning: Fight! Legendary Seven Riders
  - Fuuto, the Conspiracy Advances: Gallant! Kamen Rider Joker
  - Kamen Rider Fourze: Nadeshi-Ko Ad-Vent
  - Movie War Mega Max: Gather! Warriors of Glory
- Kamen Rider Fourze the Movie: Space, Here We Come! (2012)
- Kamen Rider × Kamen Rider Wizard & Fourze: Movie War Ultimatum (2012)
  - Kamen Rider Fourze
- Terra Formars (2016)

=== Theater ===
- No.9 – Immortal Melodies
