= Getter Robo Armageddon =

Japanese original video animation series

- Japanese DVD cover art of the first volume

真!!(チェンジ)ゲッターロボ (Change!! Getter Robo)
- Genre: Mecha
- Created by: Ken Ishikawa; Go Nagai
- Original video animation
- Directed by: Yasuhiro Imagawa (#1–3); Jun Kawagoe (#4–13)
- Produced by: Shigeru Watanabe; Tatsuo Ozawa
- Written by: Yasuhiro Imagawa (#1–4); Shinzo Fujita (#5–13); Yoshifumi Fukushima (#5–13)
- Music by: Yasunori Iwasaki
- Studio: Brain's Base; Studio OX
- Licensed by: US: A.D. Vision (former); Discotek Media (current)
- Released: August 25, 1998 – May 25, 1999
- Runtime: 30 minutes (each)
- Episodes: 13
- Manga
- Written by: Yasuhiro Imagawa
- Illustrated by: Hisashi Matsumoto
- Published by: Kodansha
- Magazine: Monthly Magazine Z
- Original run: April 2001 – December 2001
- Volumes: 3

Getter Robo Armageddon, known in Japan as Change!! Getter Robo (Note: Full anime title: Change!! Getter Robo – The Last Day of the World (真!!(チェンジ)ゲッターロボ 〜世界最後の日, Chenji!! Gettā Robo ~Sekai Saigo no Hi)) (Note: Full manga title: Change!! Getter Robo Strange Tales — Try to Remember (真!!(チェンジ)ゲッターロボ 異聞 トライトゥリメンバー, Chenji!! Gettā Robo Ibun Torai Tu Rimenbā)) (真!!(チェンジ)ゲッターロボ, Chenji!! Gettā Robo), is an OVA released between August 25, 1998, to May 25, 1999, by Bandai Visual and was animated by Brain's Base and Studio OX. The OVA is based on the manga and anime series Getter Robo, created by Ken Ishikawa and Go Nagai. The series adapts numerous elements from previous installments of both the Getter Robo manga and anime entries, in addition to other elements from Ken Ishikawa's library of work, but is an independent story from any other installments.

== Plot ==
The plot opens some time after the Moon Wars, where things for the original cast have taken a turn for the worse. The main character and pilot of Getter-1, Ryōma Nagare, has been framed for the murder of the Getter Machine builder Dr. Saotome after the death of Saotome's daughter, Michiru. However, he is released from jail and is reunited on Earth—unhappily—with his old allies, Hayato Jin and Musashi Tomoe, to fight none other than Dr. Saotome himself, who has seemingly risen from the grave to threaten humanity with his ultimate creation—and most dangerous weapon, the Shin Getter Dragon. The Shin Getter Dragon is a massive weapon powered by the same cosmic Getter Rays which gave life to their machines. However, their efforts to stop Dr. Saotome (not to mention an overzealous Japanese Defense Force), are in vain, as nuclear weapons are used on Shin Dragon.

The resulting explosion and shock wave of Getter Rays wipes out 99% of the human population worldwide. Thirteen years after this catastrophe, as humanity clings desperately to life, the re-emerged extraterrestrial invaders threaten planet Earth once more. The only safeguard against this alien threat is a giant robot that emerges from the wreckage of the nuclear blast—Shin Getter Robo—piloted by an artificially created human named Gō. With the help of Hayato's Super Robot Army and Gō's co-pilots Kei and Gai, Shin Getter fights to keep humanity's dreams alive.

Later, Ryōma returns piloting the Black Getter Robo to aid the new Getter team against Dr. Saotome, who returns with Stinger and Cowen when Shin Getter Dragon re-activates and continues its evolution. It was also revealed that Kei was Dr. Saotome's younger daughter and Michiru's younger sister, who was adopted by Benkei. Soon the invaders put their true plan into action by transforming Jupiter into a Getter Ray Sun and Ganymede, one of its moons, would soon go on a collision course with Earth, prompting both the old and new Getter teams to spring into action to save the planet.

== Characters ==
=== Old Getter Team ===
- Ryoma Nagare (流竜馬, Nagare Ryōma) – Former leader of the Getter team and pilot of Getter-1, he was framed some time before the events of the OVA for the death of Dr. Saotome. However, when Dr. Saotome seemingly returns from the dead and threatens to start the end of the world, he is released from jail to commit the very murder he was put in jail for, which he is all too happy to do. After the nuclear explosion he seems to have disappeared, but in reality he was transported 13 years into the future, and then returned from the Moon piloting the Black Getter.

Voiced by: Hideo Ishikawa (Japanese); Douglas Taylor (English)

- Hayato Jin (神隼人, Jin Hayato) – Former member of the Getter team and pilot of Getter-2, Hayato is manipulative and seems to have ulterior motives. He was the one who helped Dr. Saotome with his plan. He claims to regret helping Dr. Saotome and 13 years after the nuclear fallout, he reappears as the commander of a massive ground battleship called the Tower along with a small army of Super Robots to fight the resurfaced Invaders.

Voiced by: Naoya Uchida (Japanese); Bill Wise (English)

- Musashi Tomoe (巴武蔵, Tomoe Musashi) – Former member of the Getter team and pilot of Getter-3. After Saotome's supposed death, he took care of Genki, Saotome's daughter. However circumstances forced him back in a Getter, where he was killed by Invaders early in the story.

Voiced by: Shinpachi Tsuji (Japanese); Steve Sanders (English)

- Benkei Kuruma (車弁慶, Kuruma Benkei) – In the Armageddon story Musashi and Benkei have met and are friends, he raises Genki as his own daughter (giving her the name Kei) to protect her identity after the fallout. He plays the mentor role during most of the series but eventually returns to pilot Shin Getter.

Voiced by: Shozo Iizuka (Japanese); Lowell B. Bartholomee (English)

=== New Getter Team ===
- Go Saotome (早乙女號, Saotome Gō) – Pilot of Shin Getter-1, he is an artificial human created by Dr. Saotome in order to control Shin Dragon. After the nuclear fallout he realizes Kei is Dr. Saotome's daughter and devotes himself to protecting her. He does not seem to age, as he stays exactly the same after 13 years. Although based on the character of Go Ichimonji from Ken Ishikawa's Getter Robo Go manga, the two characters bear little similarity.

Voiced by: Tomokazu Seki (Japanese); David Stokey (English)

- Genki Saotome (早乙女元気, Saotome Genki) – The younger daughter of Dr. Saotome, she becomes traumatized after witnessing what truly happened to her older sister. When the nuclear bomb exploded, the trauma of everything caused her to become amnesic, where she began life fresh as "Kei Kuruma" (車渓, Kuruma Kei), Benkei's tomboyish daughter. As Kei, she pilots Shin Getter-2. Genki's character is a departure from the TV series, as Genki is a boy in that series as the tag-along happy-go-lucky character. Kei is based on the character of Kei Minamikaze from the Getter Robo Go manga, but aside from their appearance and involvement with the Getter Team, they are otherwise unrelated.

Voiced by: Narumi Hidaka (Japanese); Katherine Catmull (English)

- Gai (凱, Gai) – A large but good-natured guy, he was part of Benkei's group when they ventured to the outside world after 13 years. After Benkei is injured by Invaders, he becomes pilot of Shin Getter-3. He is friends with Kei and seems to have a small crush on her.

Voiced by: Yasunori Matsumoto (Japanese); Edwin Neal (English)

=== Antagonists ===
- Professor Saotome (早乙女博士, Saotome Hakase) – The father of Getter technology, he was supposedly killed by Hayato but mysteriously returned from the dead. He takes a departure from the traditional role by being the antagonist throughout most of the story. He holds a grudge against Ryoma and Hayato because of the death of Michiru, his daughter, and it is this grudge that starts his plans for the end of the world.

Voiced by: Mugihito (Japanese); John Paul Shephard (English)

- Mr. Stinger and Mr. Cowen (スティンガー&コーウェン, Sutingā ando Kōwen) – Two mysterious scientists who worked with Dr. Saotome on Getter Energy in the past. However, because of their desire for evolution they have allowed Invaders into their bodies and believe the Invaders are the only ones for the Earth, and therefore the Getter Energy. Along with Dr. Saotome, they are the antagonists of the story. Stinger and Cowen are both based on two characters from Ken Ishikawa's Majuu Sensen. Stinger is based on Dr. Barbia, and Cowen is based on Dr. Shot.
- Invaders (インベーダー, Inbēdā) – The amorphous creatures which were eradicated in the Moon Wars. However they seem to have resurfaced on Earth, with the intention of reaching Shin Dragon. After the nuclear explosion the Invaders have thrived and spread rapidly across the surface. Invaders have the power to possess humans, mutating them into hideous creatures, as well as survive even if reduced to tiny pieces. They can also assume any shape they want, as they are amorphous in nature. However their one weakness lies in the fact that Getter Rays cause their overevolution, destroying them with enough exposure. Their most distinctive features are their many eyeballs and protruding spikes.

=== Other ===
- Michiru Saotome (早乙女ミチル, Saotome Michiru) – Dr. Saotome's oldest daughter who was killed in a Getter combining accident involving Ryouma and Hayato. Dr. Saotome believes it was on purpose and holds an intense grudge against them, which starts the events of Armageddon.

Voiced by: Miki Nagasawa (Japanese); Jessica Hedrick (English)

- Professor Shikishima (敷島博士, Shikishima Hakase) – A creepy and odd scientist with a deformed face, he is always beside Hayato and is extremely interested in Shin Dragon's evolution and Go.

Voiced by: Yasuaki Suzuki (Japanese); David R. Jarrott (English)

- Schwartz (シュワルツ, Shuwarutsu) – An American Super Robot pilot in Hayato's army, he usually leads the attacks. It is implied his girlfriend was killed by Invaders in the past. He also has a hatred for the Japanese due to their hiding from the outside world, this causes him to dislike the new Getter Team. However he learns to respect the team after they save his life. He pilots the Stilva, which is a black humanoid robot capable of changing into a stealth fighter.

Voiced by: Kunihiko Yasui (Japanese); Dan Bisbee (English)

- Gore and Burai (ゴール&ブライ, Gōru ando Burai) – The Armageddon continuity's versions of Emperor Gore and Emperor Burai, the main antagonists from the original Getter Robo and Getter Robo G, respectively. In this setting they're cloned humans, made from Ryouma and Hayato's DNA and infused with Getter Rays, in order to control Shin Dragon. However, for unknown reasons became horrible monsters that rampage once awakened, eventually fusing into a giant monster (resembling Burai's Combined Hundred Oni Robot).

== Episodes ==
1. From Beyond the Grave (復活!!悪の要塞 早乙女研究所!, Fukkatsu!! Aku no Yōsai Saotome Kenkyūsho; Reborn!! Saotome Laboratory, the Stronghold of Evil!)
2. Shin Dragon: God or Devil? (脅威!! 神か悪魔か真ドラゴン!, Kyūi!! Kami ka Akuma ka Shin Doragon; Menace!! Shin Dragon, God or Devil?!)
3. Goodbye, Getters! (日本壊滅!!さらばゲッター!, Nihon Kaimetsu!! Saraba Gettā!; Japan Annihilated!! Farewell Getter!)
4. After the Blast (激震!!荒れ狂う大地!, Gekishin!! Arekuruu Daichi!; Earthquake!! The Raging Land!)
5. The New Generation (出撃!!新たなる戦士たち!, Shutsugeki!! Aratanaru Senshi-tachi!; Sortie!! New Warriors!)
6. The Awful Truth (悪夢!!暴かれた真実!, Akumu!! Abakareta Shinjitsu; Nightmare!! The Truth Revealed!)
7. Into the Dragon (決戦!!スーパーロボット軍団!, Kessen!! Sūpā Robotto Gundan!; Decisive Battle!! Super Robot Army!)
8. Blood and Ice (死闘!!血に染まる氷原!, Shitō!! Ketsu ni Somaru Hyōgen!; Struggle to the Death!! Blood Dyed Ice Fields!)
9. Battleground: Manhattan (謀略!!摩天楼の決闘!, Hōryaku!! Matenrō no Kettō; Stratagem!! Skyscraper Duel!)
10. War in the Pacific (降臨!!南海を断つ邪神!, Kōrin!! Nankai o Tatsu Jashin!; Advent!! The Evil God that Cleaves the Southern Sea!)
11. Overload! (襲来!!甦る亡者たち!, Shōrai!! Yomigaeru Mōja-tachi!; Invasion!! Resurrection of the Dead!)
12. Help from the Stars (戦慄!!砕け散る魂!, Senritsu!! Kudakechiru Tamashii!; Tremble!! Smashed Spirits!)
13. Evolution's End (閃光!!進化の果て!, Senkō!! Shinka no Hate!; Flash!! Evolution's End!)

== Manga ==
Mazinkaiser vs. Getter Robo Armageddon (Note: Japanese title: Mazinkaiser vs. Shin Getter Robo (マジンカイザー対真ゲッターロボ, Majinkaizā tai Shin Gettā Robo))

Written by Masanao Akahoshi and illustrated by Moo Nenpei. A crossover manga of the Mazinger and Getter Robo series from the Immortal Super Robot Encyclopedia, released about one month after VHS volume 1. Although it was released as a companion to the OVA, the setting conformed more to the one found in the Toei Manga Festival movies (e.g. Getter Robo vs Great Mazinger). In the magazine that published it, this manga was posted with a set of introductions from the OVA series.

Try to Remember

Written by Yasuhiro Imagawa and illustrated by Hisashi Matsumoto. The manga was serialized in Kodansha's Super Robot Battle Tribute. While the characters, terms, and the worldview have some parts in common with the OVA, the stories presented in the manga are different from that of the OVA. In addition, characters from Go Nagai's manga Gakuen Taikutsu Otoko also appear.

== Controversy ==
Yasuhiro Imagawa was originally put in charge of the project. Due to an unknown disagreement with the staff, he left the project, leaving the story in disarray from episode 4 and onward. His directing role was replaced by Jun Kawagoe for the subsequent episodes. Kawagoe would later go on to direct the Shin Getter Robo vs. Neo Getter Robo, New Getter Robo OVAs and the Getter Robo Arc television series.

== Reception ==
Daryl Surat of Otaku USA Magazine calls the animation "spectacular" and argues that even without Imagawa's guidance, the series despite taking a different turn still ended strongly. Bamboo Dong of Anime News Network was highly critical of the narrative, animation and artwork, critiquing the hard-to-follow story and the "almost disturbing to watch" physics of Ryoma's scarf, along with the "extraneous and overdone lines on the characters" that tend to "clutter the screen". Getter Robo Armageddon sold an average of 24,076 copies (VHS, LD, VHD, DVD, LD-BOX, DVD-BOX) making it one of the top 50 sold anime up to 2008.

== Release ==
Bandai Visual originally released the OVA across seven volumes on VHS and Laserdisc, priced at 1,500 yen per episode (which was an unusual price for OVAs at the time and now). In 2007, the series received a DVD boxed set release and in 2009 was released on UMD Video. In 2010, the OVA received a remastered Blu-Ray release, once again from Bandai Visual.

The OVA was licensed in the US by ADV Films on DVD under the title Getter Robo Armageddon. Following the closure of ADV Films in 2009, the series was more recently licensed and released by Discotek Media on Blu-ray on March 29, 2016.
