= Young Animal Arashi =

Japanese manga magazine

- Cover of the September 2012 issue featuring model Anri Sugihara, published by Hakusensha on August 3, 2012
- Categories: Seinen manga
- Frequency: Monthly
- Circulation: 70,000; (October – December 2017)
- First issue: 2000
- Final issue: 2018
- Company: Hakusensha
- Country: Japan
- Based in: Tokyo
- Language: Japanese
- Website: www.ya-arasi.com/index.html

Young Animal Arashi (Japanese: ヤングアニマル嵐, Hepburn: Yangu Animaru Arashi) was a monthly Japanese seinen manga magazine published by Hakusensha. A sister magazine to Young Animal, it was released on the first Friday of every month in B5 format from 2000 to 2018.

== Series featured in the magazine ==
The following is a partial list of the artists and manga serialized in the magazine:

- Hikari Asada (story), Maru Asakura (art)
  - 14 Juicy
- Kanji Kawashima
  - Anko Bomb-a-Yeah!!
- Serika Himuro
  - Aoi no Yuuwaku
- Ichiro Sasaki (story), Kazuo Maekawa (art)
  - Crack Hound
- Takakazu Nagakubo (story), Tsuyoshi Masuda (art)
  - Ecchi no Kamisama!
  - Miyakuji Otoshi
- Katsu Aki
  - Futari Ecchi
- Fumihiro Hayashizaki
  - Gabumento
- Jun Fujishima
  - Ginburu Taiheiki
- Hitoshi Iwaaki
  - Heureka
- GoDo (story), TAGRO (art)
  - Himawari Den!
- Rei Nakajima
  - Inumimi
  - Nurse Witch Komugi-chan Magikarte
- Yumi Unita
  - Kiki
- Kenjiro Kawatsu
  - Koibana Onsen
- Takeshi Matsumoto
  - Magical Strawberry
- Junya Takeuchi
  - Miko Shimai
- Maru Asakura
  - Mugen Shoujo
- Ryuta Amazume
  - Nana to Kaoru
  - Toshiue no Hito
- Shigemitsu Harada (story), Takahiro Seguchi (art)
  - My Balls
- Shizuya Wazarai
  - Kentō Shitō Den Cestvs (2014–2018) moved to Manga Park
- Tomohiro Takashima
  - Panda Zuke
- LINDA
  - Seki-la-la Kanojo
- Hideaki Nishikawa
  - Shokugyo Koroshiya
  - Apocrypha Getter Robot Dash
- Mahiru Teku
  - Zenbu, Kimi no Sei da
