= Yasuhiro Imagawa =

Japanese anime director and screenwriter (born 1961)

- Born: July 24, 1961 (age 65)
- Occupations: Anime director; screenwriter
- Known for: Giant Robo; Mobile Fighter G Gundam; Berserk; Tetsujin 28-go; Mazinger Edition Z: The Impact!

Yasuhiro Imagawa (今川 泰宏, Imagawa Yasuhiro; born July 24, 1961) is a Japanese anime director and screenwriter.

== Works ==
=== Anime ===
Major works

Year	Title	Series director	Head writer	Type
1987–1989	Mister Ajikko	Yes	No	TV series
1992–1998	Giant Robo	Yes	Yes	OVA series
1994–1995	Gin Rei	Yes	No	OVA series
1994–1995	Mobile Fighter G Gundam	Yes	No	TV series
1996–1997	Violinist of Hameln	No	Yes	TV series
1997	Hareluya II: Boy	No	Yes	TV series
1997–1998	Berserk	No	Yes	TV series
1998	Virgin Fleet	No	Yes	OVA series
1998–1999	Getter Robo Armageddon	Yes	Yes	OVA series
1999	Pet Shop of Horrors	No	Yes	TV miniseries
2001–2002	Seven of Seven	Yes	Yes	TV series
2004	Tetsujin 28	Yes	Yes	TV series
2006	Bartender	No	Yes	TV series
2006–2007	Fist of the Blue Sky	No	Yes	TV series
2007	Tetsujin 28: The Morning Moon of Midday	Yes	Yes	Theatrical film
2008	Dazzle	No	Yes	TV series
2009	Mazinger Edition Z: The Impact!	Yes	Yes	TV series
2013	Kanetsugu & Keiji	No	Yes	TV series
2014	Wasimo	Yes	Yes	TV series

Minor works

- Bremen 4: Angels in Hell (TV film, assistant director, 1981)
- Yattodetaman (TV series, assistant director, 1981–1982)
- Combat Mecha Xabungle (TV series, storyboard, 1982–1983)
- Tokimeki Tonight (TV series, storyboard, 1982–1983)
- Fang of the Sun Dougram (TV series, storyboard, 1981–1983)
- Aura Battler Dunbine (TV series, storyboard, 1983–1984)
- Heavy Metal L-Gaim (TV series, storyboard, 1984–1985)
- Mobile Suit Zeta Gundam (TV series, storyboard, 1984–1985)
- Pro Golfer Saru (TV series, storyboard, 1985–1988)
- Diary of Our Days at the Breakwater (TV series, episode script, 2020)

=== Manga ===
- Giant Robo: The Day the Earth Stood Still (with Mari Mizuta, 1992–1993)
- Getter Robo Armageddon: Try to Remember (with Hisashi Matsumoto, 2001)
- Seven of Seven (with Azusa Kunihiro, 2001–2002)
- Giant Robo: The Day the Earth Burned (with Yasunari Toda, 2006–2011)
- Chōkyū! Kidō Butōden G Gundam (with Kazuhiko Shimamoto, 2010–2011)
