= Ken Ishikawa =

Japanese manga artist (1948–2006)

- Born: Kenichi Ishikawa (石川 賢一, Ishikawa Kenichi); June 28, 1948; Karasuyama, Tochigi
- Died: November 15, 2006 (aged 58)
- Occupation: Manga artist
- Known for: Getter Robo

Ken Ishikawa (石川賢, Ishikawa Ken; June 28, 1948 – November 15, 2006) was a Japanese manga artist. He is renowned as the co-creator (with Go Nagai) of the Getter Robo anime series, as well as four of their subsequent manga continuations. According to Nagai, he considered Ishikawa his greatest friend and ally.

== Death ==
Ishikawa collapsed at a dinner banquet after golfing; he was rushed to the hospital where he was pronounced dead. The causes of death was acute heart failure.

== Influences ==
Kazuki Nakashima, chief editor of the Getter Robo Saga compilation cited Ken Ishikawa as an influence when he worked on the series composition of the anime show, Gurren Lagann, and also gave a memorial address at his funeral. He also calls himself Ken Ishikawa's number one fan.

Ishikawa's early art is quite reminiscent of that of his mentor, Go Nagai.

An adaptation of Ishikawa's manga Gokudō Heiki was filmed as Yakuza Weapon in 2011. The film is dedicated to Ishikawa.

== Works ==
=== Manga ===
- Getter Robo Saga (with Go Nagai)
  - Getter Robo (6 vol) (1974–75)
  - Getter Robo Go (7 vol) (1990)
  - Shin Getter Robo (2 vol) (1997)
  - Getter Robo Arc (3 vol, uncompleted) (2002)
- Kyomu Senki (Records of Nothingness)
  - Kyomu Senshi MIROKU (6 vol) (1987-1990)
  - Shiragikimon
  - Ninpō Hannouji Kashinkoji Yōjutsu
  - 5000 Kōnen no Tora (1980-1982)
  - Dogra Senki
  - Jigen Seibutsuki Dogra
  - Jakiō Bakuretsu (1987)
  - Skull Killer Jakiō (2 vol) (1990)
- Cutey Honey (1 vol) (1973 manga adaptation that ran in Bouken Oh)
- Ultraman Taro (1973 manga adaptation that ran in Shonen Sunday)
- Majū Sensen (3 vol) (1975)
- Seimaden (Saint Devil) (1977)
- Battle Hawk (with Go Nagai) (1978)
- Machine Saurer (first 6 months only) (1978)
- Makai Tenshō (1987)
- Heaven and Earth (1987)
- Seiten Taisen Freeder Bag (2 Vol) (1990)
- Garou Densetsu (1994)
- Samurai Spirits (1 vol) (1995)
- MAGA (2000)
- Eurasia 1274 (2001)
- Super Robot Wars (2002)
- Shinsetsu Majū Sensen (4 vol) (2004)
- Musashi~Isetsu Kengō Denki~ (2005-2006)
- Aztekaiser (with Go Nagai) (2 vol)
- Bakumatsuden (3 vol)
- Dynamic Superobot (with Go Nagai)
- Godzilla
- Momotaro Jigokuken (1 vol)
- Makuh Hakken Den
- Southern Cross Kid (4 vol)
- Tsu Ku Mo Ranzo (1 vol)
- Gokudō Heiki (1996)

=== Anime ===
- Getter Robo Series (original manga) (1974)
- Great Mazinger vs. Getter Robo (original idea) (1975)
- Great Mazinger tai Getter Robo G - Kuuchuu Dai-Gekitotsu (original idea) (1975)
- Robby the Rascal (Cybot Robotchi) (original idea) (TV series, 1982–83; U.S.-released compilation film, 1985)
- Kyomu Senshi Miroku (Expunged Chronicle of Miroku) (original manga) (1989)
- Majū Sensen (Demon Beast Warfront), Beast Fighter (original manga) (1990)
- Getter Robo Go (original manga) (1992)
- Gin Rei (mecha design) (1994-1995)
- Dragon Slayer: The Legend of Heroes (character designer) (1992)
- Ninja Resurrection (original manga) (1997-1998)
- Getter Robo Armageddon (original manga) (1998)
- Shin Getter Robo vs Neo Getter Robo (original manga) (2000)
- Beast Fighter, The Apocalypse (original manga) (2003)
- New Getter Robo (original manga) (2004)

=== Art books ===
- Majin Illustration Collection (3 vol)
