= Todd Haberkorn =

American voice actor

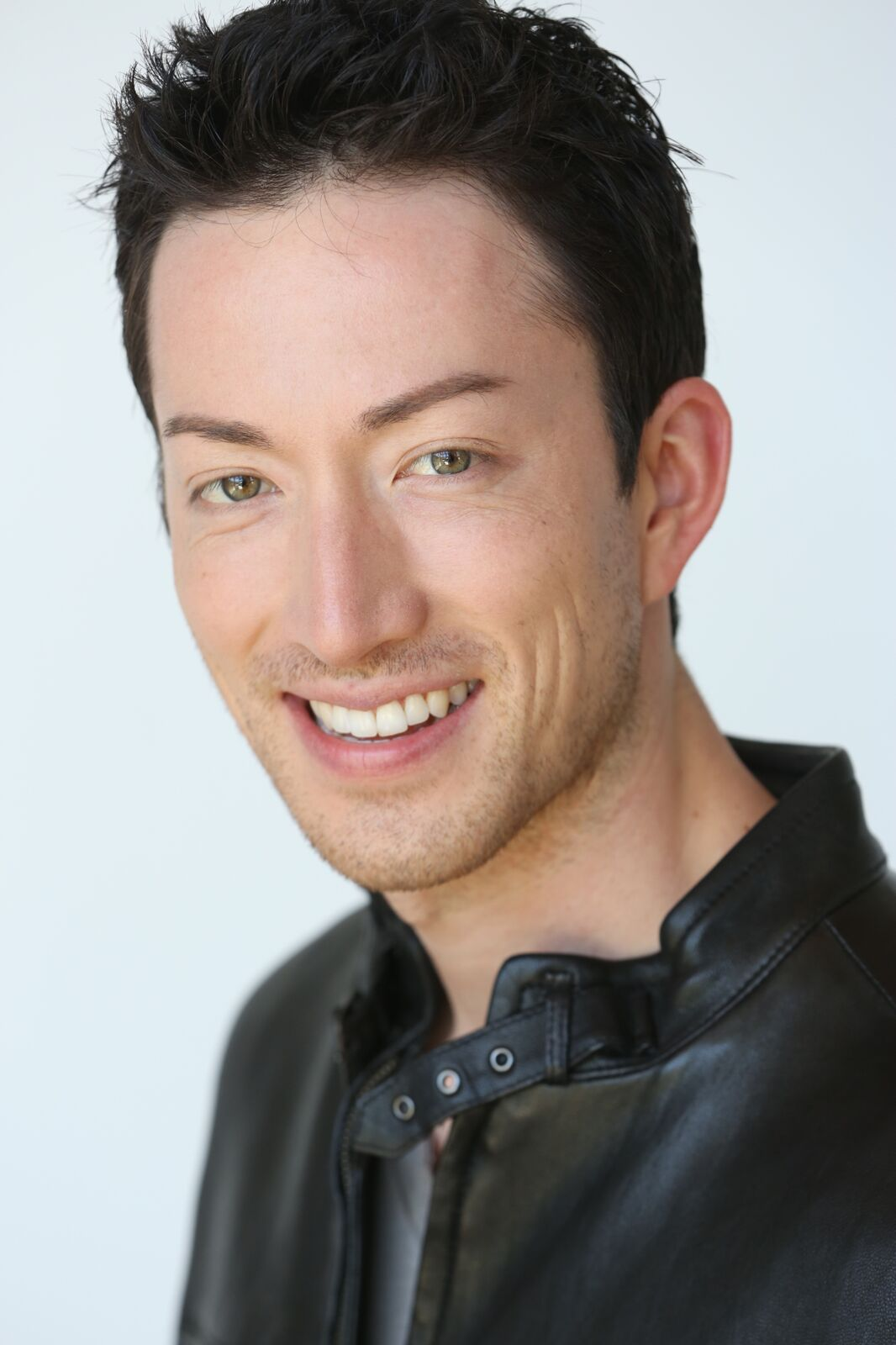
- Haberkorn in 2015
- Other name: Todd Stone
- Occupations: Voice actor; voice director
- Years active: 2006–present
- Agents: The Horne Agency; Atlas Talent Agency
- Known for: Keroro from Sgt. Frog; Allen Walker from D.Gray-man; Death the Kid from Soul Eater; Teruteru Hanamura from Danganronpa 2: Goodbye Despair and Danganronpa 2×2; Korekiyo Shinguji from Danganronpa V3: Killing Harmony; Natsu Dragneel from Fairy Tail
- Spouses: Bonnie Vanwinkle (m. 2008; div. 2010) Nicole Corona (m. 2021)
- Children: 1
- Website: www.toddhaberkorn.com

Todd Haberkorn is an American voice actor and voice director who has dubbed in anime, films, and video games. Some of his notable roles include Keroro from Sgt. Frog, Allen Walker from D.Gray-man, Death the Kid from Soul Eater, Teruteru Hanamura from Danganronpa 2: Goodbye Despair and Danganronpa 2×2, Korekiyo Shinguji from Danganronpa V3: Killing Harmony and Natsu Dragneel from Fairy Tail.

== Career ==
While Haberkorn was working in theater, he joined Funimation as a voice actor, with minor roles in One Piece, Black Cat, and Peach Girl. Since then, he has voiced characters such as Keroro from Sgt. Frog, Natsu Dragneel in Fairy Tail, Italy in Hetalia: Axis Powers, Hikaru Hitachiin in Ouran High School Host Club, Allen Walker in D.Gray-man, Death the Kid in Soul Eater, Tsukune Aono in Rosario + Vampire, Kimihiro Watanuki in xxxHolic, and Yamato Akitsuki in Suzuka.

He also played Aru Akise, one of the main characters in Future Diary and provided the English dub voice for Hiroki Hasegawa in Shin Godzilla, as well as Razor in Genshin Impact and Drifter in Destiny 2.

In live-action, he provided the voice of the different members of the Cell during the third season of Danger Force. He also played Spock in Star Trek Continues. He has also worked in Los Angeles as an actor, director, producer and writer. He was also the voice of Ceylan Jones in Tenkai Knights.

== Personal life ==
Haberkorn is of partial Vietnamese descent on the maternal side of his family, while his father's side of the family is of Scandinavian descent.

Haberkorn married Bonnie Vanwinkle on February 29, 2008. They divorced on November 19, 2010. He has one son from a previous relationship, who was born in 2004. In 2021, he married his partner, Nicole Corona.

== Filmography ==
=== Anime ===
List of dubbed voice performances in anime
Year	Title	Role	Notes	Source
2006	Black Cat	Flitt Morris		Voice123
2006	Crayon Shin-chan	The Flamer	Funimation dub	
2006	AM Driver	Jenath Dira		Resume
2007	One Piece	Koza, Siam	Funimation dub	
2007	Suzuka	Yamato Akitsuki	First major role	Resume
2007	Tsubasa Reservoir Chronicle	Kimihiro Watanuki		CA
2007	Mushishi	Nagi	Ep. 6	CA
2007	Glass Fleet	Magnus, others	Assistant ADR Director	CA
2007–08	School Rumble	Kentaro Nara		CA
2008	Shuffle!	Itsuki Midoriba	ADR Director	Tweet
2008	xxxHolic	Kimihiro Watanuki		CA
2008	Sasami: Magical Girls Club	Monta		
2008	Claymore	Raki	ADR Director	
2008	Ghost Hunt	Kazuya Shibuya		Resume
2008	School Rumble	Kentaro Nara		
2009	Beet the Vandel Buster	Jikku		Resume
2009	The Tower of Druaga series	Jil		Resume
2009	Ouran High School Host Club	Hikaru Hitachiin		
2009	Baccano!	Firo Prochainezo		
2009	Big Windup!	Yuichiro Tajima		
2009	Sgt. Frog	Keroro		Resume
2009	Blassreiter	Joseph Jobson		Resume
2009–18	D.Gray-man	Allen Walker	Co-assistant ADR Director	Resume
2010	Rin: Daughters of Mnemosyne	Apos		
2010	Eden of the East	Jintaro Tsuji		
2010	Strike Witches	Meyer		CA
2010	Sands of Destruction	Kyrie Ilnis		Resume
2010	Soul Eater	Death the Kid		
2010	Initial D series	Keisuke Takahashi	Funimation dub	
2010	Fullmetal Alchemist: Brotherhood	Ling Yao		
2010	Dragon Ball Z Kai	Android 19		
2010	My Bride Is a Mermaid	Nagasumi Michishio		Resume
2010	Hetalia: Axis Powers series	Italy		Resume
2010	Sekirei	Hayato Mikogami		
2011	Ga-Rei: Zero	Kensuke Nimura	Ep. 12	
2011	Black Butler series	Viscount Druitt		
2011	Phantom: Requiem for the Phantom	Atsushi Motegi		
2011	Baka and Test	Kyoji Nemoto		
2011	Chaos;Head	Takumi Nishijo		
2011	Rosario + Vampire series	Tsukune Aono		
2011–19	Fairy Tail	Natsu Dragneel		
2012	Okami-san and Her Seven Companions	Taro Urashima		
2012	Shiki	Masao Murasako		
2012	Fractale	Colin		
2012	Shangri-La	Soichiro Hata		
2012	Nura: Rise of the Yokai Clan series	Kubinashi	As Todd Stone	
2012	Aria the Scarlet Ammo	Kinji Toyama	Also AA	
2012	C	Kimimaro Yoga		
2012–13	Shakugan no Shana	Khamsin Nbh'w	Funimation dub	
2012–14	Hellsing Ultimate	Tom, Wild Geese, Vatican Officers	As Todd Stone	
2012–14	Bleach	Moe Shishigawari		
2013	Naruto: Shippuden	Atsui, Animal Path (Nagato), Genin Rain Shinobi, Young Gamamaru. Young Might Guy		Resume
2013	Tenkai Knights	Ceylan Jones / Tributon		Resume
2013	B-Daman Crossfire	Alba Cocodoro	As Todd Stone	
2013	Blood-C	Dog		
2013	Toriko	Takimaru		
2013	Accel World	Crimson Kingbolt	As Todd Stone	
2013	K Project series	Izumo Kusanagi, Kousuke Fujishima		
2013	Guilty Crown	Kurosu Ouma		
2013	Eureka Seven: AO	Truth		
2013	Magi: The Labyrinth of Magic series	Judar		
2013	Good Luck Girl!	Momo'o Inugami		
2013	Aesthetica of a Rogue Hero	Phil Barnett		
2013	Ikki Tousen: Great Guardians	En'in	Ep. 2	
2013	Sword Art Online	Nobuyuki Sugou / Oberon		
2013	Digimon Fusion	Puppetmon, Metalmamemon, Daigo Aonuma, Sethmon		
2013, 2017	Future Diary	Aru Akise	Also Redial in 2017	
2014	Sushi Ninja	Maguro		
2014	Space Dandy	Carpaccio		
2014	Code:Breaker	Toki Fujiwara		
2014	Knights of Sidonia	Norio Kunato		
2014–15	Kill la Kill	Shiro Iori	Also OVA	
2014–15	Sailor Moon	Jadeite	Viz dub	
2014–19	Attack on Titan	Marlowe		
2015	Tokyo Ghoul series	Ayato Kirishima		
2015	The Disappearance of Nagato Yuki-chan	Yukata Tamaru	Ep. 8 Co-ADR Director	
2015	Free! - Iwatobi Swim Club series	Haruka Nanase		
2015	Aldnoah.Zero	Trillam	Eps. 1–3	
2015	Fate/stay night: Unlimited Blade Works	Assassin	Television series	
2015	Attack on Titan: Junior High	Marlowe	Co-assistant ADR Director	
2015	Daimidaler the Sound Robot	Shouma Ameku		
2015–16	Sailor Moon Crystal	Jadeite		
2015–16	Glitter Force	Pop		
2016	Snow White with the Red Hair	Raj Schenazade		
2016	Prince of Stride: Alternative	Tomoe Yagami		
2016	Fairy Tail Zero	Natsu Dragneel		
2016	Grimgar of Fantasy and Ash	Kikkawa		
2016	Brothers Conflict	Hikaru Asahina		
2016	Ajin: Demi-Human	Tosaki	Netflix dub	
2016	Shōnen Maid	Keiichirō Shinozaki		
2016	One Punch Man	Drive Knight		
2016	Danganronpa 3: The End of Hope's Peak High School	Teruteru Hanamura	Also in the Hope Arc special	
2016	Show By Rock!! #	Deyan	Ep. 7	
2016	Aquarion Logos	Akira Kaibuki		
2016	Kuromukuro	Tom Borden	Netflix dub	
2016	March Comes In like a Lion	Toji Soya		
2016–18	Dagashi Kashi	Kokonotsu Shikada	2 seasons	
2017	Dragon Ball Super	Jaco		
2017	Fūka	Yamato Akitsuki		
2017	Rio: Rainbow Gate!	Mr. Clark		
2017	Gosick	Wong Kai		
2017	Samurai Warriors	Takatora Todo		
2017	Hunter × Hunter	Genthru	2011 version	
2017	Glitter Force Doki Doki	Riva	ADR Director	
2017	The Testament of Sister New Devil	Takashi Hayase		
2017	The Ancient Magus' Bride	Lindel		
2017	Black Clover	Salim de Hapsass		
2017	Mobile Suit Gundam Thunderbolt: Bandit Flower	Billy Hickam		
2017	Ai No Kusabi: The Space Between	Iason Mink		
2018	Yamada-kun and the Seven Witches	Toranosuke Miyamura		
2018	Terra Formars	Joseph Gustav Newton		
2018	Pop Team Epic	Popuko	Ep. 6b	
2018	Re:Zero − Starting Life in Another World	Petelgeuse Romanée-Conti		Tweet
2018	Katsugeki/Touken Ranbu	Mikazuki Munechika		
2018	Skip Beat!	Shinichi Ishibashi / Seiji Shingai		
2018	B: The Beginning	Quinn, Jonathan	Netflix dub	
2018	Bungo Stray Dogs	Edgar Allan Poe		
2018	Children of the Whales	Ouni	Netflix dub	
2018	Last Hope	Sieg	Netflix dub	
2018	Twin Star Exorcists	Ryogo Nagitsuji	Netflix dub	
2018	Saint Seiya: The Lost Canvas	Hypnos	Netflix dub	
2018	Boruto: Naruto Next Generations	Shikadai Nara	Netflix dub	Tweet
2018	Megalobox	Goskino	Netflix dub	
2018–23	Aggretsuko	Komiya	Netflix dub	
2019	Gundam Build Divers	Shahryar		
2019	Ingress: The Animation	Zion Kunikida	Netflix dub	
2019	Levius	Bill Weinberg	Netflix dub	
2019	Kengan Ashura	Setsuna Kiryu, Adam Dudley, Takayuki Chiba	Netflix dub	
2020	Scissor Seven	Redtooth		
2020	Marvel Future Avengers	Bruno/Twister, The Hood	ADR Director	
2020	Drifting Dragons	Niko	Netflix dub	
2020	Dorohedoro	Asu / Kawajiri	Netflix dub	
2020	My Hero Academia	Hiroshi Tameda	Season 4	
2021	High-Rise Invasion	Kazuma Aohara	Netflix dub	
2021	Pretty Boy Detective Club	Lai Fudatsuki		
2021	Moriarty the Patriot	Viscount Baxter		
2022	Blue Period	Haruka Hashida	ADR Director; Netflix dub	
2022	Komi Can't Communicate	Yuji Otaku, Tsukasa Aizawa, Junior Cat, Katsuki Yadano	Netflix dub	
2022	Bastard!! Heavy Metal, Dark Fantasy	Efreet, Joshua Belahia	Netflix dub	
2022	Tekken: Bloodline	Hwoarang	Netflix dub	
2022	Bleach: Thousand-Year Blood War	Ikkaku Madarame		
2022	JoJo's Bizarre Adventure: Stone Ocean	Ungalo		
2024	Delicious in Dungeon	Narrator	Netflix dub	Tweet
2024	Go! Go! Loser Ranger!	Shun Tokita		
2024	The Elusive Samurai	Kiyohara Shinano-no-kami		
2024	Fairy Tail: 100 Years Quest	Natsu Dragneel		
2024	Mononoke the Movie: Phantom in the Rain	Hiramoto		
2025	Sakamoto Days	Horiguchi		

=== Animation ===
List of voice performances in animation
Year	Title	Role	Notes	Source
2014	The Legend of Korra	Baatar Jr.	8 episodes	
2014–16	Ever After High	Sparrow Hood		Resume
2015	Be Cool, Scooby-Doo!	Aiden, David	Episode: "Scary Christmas"	
2015	Miraculous: Tales of Ladybug & Cat Noir	Xavier Ramier / Mr. Pigeon		
2015	Sofia the First	Elfonso	Episode: "Sofia in Elvenmoor"	
2016–21	Ben 10	Grey Matter, Tetrax, Slapback, Solar Twain, various characters		
2017	Avengers Assemble	Haechi, Astronaut	Episode: "Civil War Part 2: The Mighty Avengers"	
2018	Cadette in Charge	Sam	Pilot	
2019	Robot Chicken	Bambi, Brainy Smurf, Steve	Episode: "Spike Fraser in: Should I Happen to Back Into a Horse"	
2019–21	Power Players	Galileo, Dynamo		
2020	Transformers: War for Cybertron Trilogy	Shockwave, Red Alert		
2022	Kung Fu Panda: The Dragon Knight	Emperor, Rhino Guard #2	4 episodes	
2022–2024	Hello Neighbor: Welcome to Raven Brooks	Ivan, Crowface	2 episodes; also voice director	
2022–2024	Big Nate	Artur Pashkov		
2023	The Loud House	Chuck, Attendant, Judge	Episode: "Road Trip: From Brad to Worse"	
2024	Megamind Rules!	Big King Fish	Episode: "The Villainous Origin of Mr. Donut"	
2024	X-Men '97	Henry Peter Gyrich	2 episodes	
2024	Tales of the Teenage Mutant Ninja Turtles	Son		
2024-2026	Max & the Midknights	King Conrad, Artur Pashkov		

=== Film ===
List of voice performances in films
Year	Title	Role	Notes	Source
2008	One Piece Movie: The Desert Princess and the Pirates: Adventures in Alabasta	Kohza		
2011	Eden of the East the Movie: King of Eden	Tsuji		
2011	Eden of the East the Movie: Paradise Lost	Tsuji		
2012	King of Thorn	Walter		
2012	Mass Effect: Paragon Lost	Milque		
2013	Fairy Tail the Movie: Phoenix Priestess	Natsu Dragneel	First screened at Nan Desu Kan 2013	
2014	Hal	Ryu		
2014	Dive Olly Dive and the Pirate Treasure	Pudding		
2015	Monster High: Haunted	Porter Geiss		
2015	Hotel Transylvania 2	Additional voices		
2015	Monster High: Boo York, Boo York	Skeleton		
2015	Dragon Ball Z: Resurrection 'F'	Jaco		
2016	The Empire of Corpses	Friday	Limited theatrical release	
2016	Kingsglaive: Final Fantasy XV	Luche Lazarus	Limited theatrical release	
2017	Boruto: Naruto the Movie	Shikadai Nara		
2017	Gantz:O	Suzuki		
2017	In This Corner of the World	Shusaku		
2017	Fairy Tail: Dragon Cry	Natsu Dragneel		
2017	Shin Godzilla	Rando Yaguchi	Funimation dub	
2017	Hedgehogs	Scientist		
2018	Big Fish & Begonia	Kun	Limited theatrical release	
2018	Fate/stay night: Heaven's Feel I: Presage Flower	Assassin	Limited theatrical release	
2018	Hotel Transylvania 3: Summer Vacation	Additional voices		
2018	Digimon Adventure tri.	Digimon Emperor	Limited theatrical release, parts 5–6	
2018	Free! – Timeless Medley – The Promise	Haruka Nanase		
2018	Free! – Timeless Medley – The Bond	Haruka Nanase		
2018	Free! Take Your Marks	Haruka Nanase		
2018	The Seven Deadly Sins the Movie: Prisoners of the Sky	Bellion		
2020	A Whisker Away	Yōji Sasaki, Sugita	Netflix dub	
2020	Hayop Ka!	Inigo	Netflix dub	
2020	Ben 10 Versus The Universe: The Movie	Slapback, Tetrax Shard, Solar Twain		
2022	Mis/Identity	Titus		
2024	Megamind vs. the Doom Syndicate	Big King Fish		
2025	Anpanman: Apple Boy and Everyone's Hope	Uncle Jam	Netflix dub	

=== Live-action ===
List of acting performances in film and television
Year	Title	Role	Notes	Source
2006	Barney & Friends	Mr. Knickerbocker	Video: "Let's Make Music/Tryin' on Dreams"	Resume
2008–09	Funimation Updates	Host	Webcasts	
2011	Scream of the Banshee	Otto	Television film	Resume
2013–17	Star Trek Continues	Mr. Spock	11 episodes	
2017	Shin Godzilla	Rando Yaguchi	Funimation dub	
2023	Danger Force	Number 1, Number 22, Various Cell members (voices)	Recurring role	

=== Video games ===
List of voice performances in video games
Year	Title	Role	Notes	Source
2008	Dragon Ball Z: Burst Limit	Announcer		Resume
2008	Brothers in Arms: Hell's Highway	Corporal Thomas Zanovich		Resume
2009	Lux-Pain	Ryo Unami		Resume
2009	Case Closed: The Mirapolis Investigation	Keith Kozlof		
2009	Dragon Ball: Raging Blast	Android 19		
2009	Dragon Ball: Revenge of King Piccolo	VS Announcer		
2010	Super Street Fighter IV: Arcade Edition	Yun		
2010	Lufia: Curse of the Sinistrals	Maxim		Resume
2010	Dragon Ball: Raging Blast 2	Android 19, Tarble		
2010	Rune Factory 3	Micah		Resume
2011	Monster Tale	Meade		
2011	Orcs Must Die!	Elf Archer		
2011	Rage	Jackals		Resume
2011	Rune Factory: Tides of Destiny	Bismark		
2011	Dragon Ball Z: Ultimate Tenkaichi	Android 19		
2012	Borderlands 2	Moorin, Obnoxious Singer, Some Guy, Tran Cancelmo, Wilhelm, Wizard Simon		
2012	Dragon Ball Z: For Kinect	Android 19		
2013	Fire Emblem Awakening	Morgan (Male)	As Todd Stone	
2013	Tales of Xillia	Rowen J. Ilbert		Tweet
2014	Danganronpa 2: Goodbye Despair	Teruteru Hanamura		
2014	Dragon Ball Z: Battle of Z	Android #19		
2014	Earth Defense Force 2025	Various Soldiers		Tweet
2014	Smite	Vamana (Original), Lil' Mana		
2014	Tenkai Knights: Brave Battle	Ceylan / Tributon		
2014	Ultra Street Fighter IV	Yun		
2016	Seven Knights	Jave		Facebook
2016	Ghostbusters	Ghoul		Resume
2016	Battleborn	Boldur		
2016	Dragon Ball Xenoverse 2	Jaco		
2017	Fire Emblem Heroes	Joshua, Siegbert, Morgan (Male)		
2017	Club Penguin Island	Gary, Shellbeard, Herbert		
2017	Akiba's Beat	Kanon		
2017	Danganronpa V3: Killing Harmony	Korekiyo Shinguji		Tweet
2018	Dragon Ball Legends	Android 19, Jaco		
2018	Detective Pikachu	Wallace Carroll		
2018	Mega Man 11	Fuse Man		
2018	Realm Royale	Assassin		
2018	Sushi Striker: The Way of Sushido	Rio		
2018	Destiny 2: Forsaken	Drifter		
2018	Identity V	Freddy Riley / Lawyer		
2019	Yo-kai Watch 3	Steve Jaws, Deadcool, Runsure, Why Naant		
2019	Devil May Cry 5	Nobody, King Baphomet		
2019	Rage 2	Bobba Glass, Sol Tevee, Goon Minigunner		
2019	Zanki Zero	Daichi Terashima, Male Creature		
2019	Judgment	Ishimatsu		
2019	Fire Emblem: Three Houses	Metodey		
2019	Kill la Kill: IF	Shiro Iori		
2019	Marvel Ultimate Alliance 3: The Black Order	Ebony Maw		
2020	Dragon Ball Z: Kakarot	Android 19		
2020	Resident Evil 3	Murphy Seeker		
2020	Desperados III	Arthur "Doc" McCoy		
2020	Fallout 76: Wastelanders	Raider Punk, Nuclear Don, Earle Williams, Blood Eagles		
2020	Fallout 76: Steel Dawn	Initiate Russell Dorsey		
2020	Bugsnax	Shishkabug		
2020	Genshin Impact	Razor		
2020	Yakuza: Like a Dragon	Additional voices		
2021	Mr. Love: Queen's Choice	Cyril		
2021	Re:Zero − Starting Life in Another World: The Prophecy of the Throne	Petelgeuse Romanée-Conti		
2021	Persona 5 Strikers	Additional voices		
2021	Monster Hunter Rise	Kagero		
2021	BloodRayne Betrayal: Fresh Bites	Raven, Brimstoner 2		
2021	Lost Judgment	Jin Kuwana	English dub	
2021	Voice of Cards: The Isle Dragon Roars	Game Master		
2022	Stranger of Paradise: Final Fantasy Origin	Astos		
2022	Relayer	Alnitak		
2022	Fire Emblem Warriors: Three Hopes	Metodey		
2022	Star Ocean: The Divine Force	Bohld'or Il Vey'l		
2022	River City Girls 2	Ken, Aleister, Naritaka		
2022	Hi-Fi Rush	Zanzo, CAR-11E, VA-SER		
2023	Granblue Fantasy: Relink	Inquisitor Rook		
2023	Mato Anomalies	Gram, Old Beggar, Kid A		In-game credits
2023	Scars Above	Mike		
2023	Wo Long: Fallen Dynasty	Zhang Rang		
2023	The Legend of Heroes: Trails into Reverie	Henry McDowell, Tap, Ebon Defense Force		
2023	Octopath Traveler II	Additional voices		
2023	Azure Striker Gunvolt 3	Cayman		
2023	Armored Core VI: Fires of Rubicon	Additional voices		
2023	Tower of God: New World	Hansung Yu		
2023	Like a Dragon Gaiden: The Man Who Erased His Name	Additional voices		
2024	Persona 3 Reload	Additional voices		
2024	Helldivers 2	General Brasch		
2024	Romancing SaGa 2: Revenge of the Seven	Sparrow/Vagabond (M)		
2024	Farmagia	Gâteau		
2025	Like a Dragon: Pirate Yakuza in Hawaii	Keith		
2025	Kirby Air Riders	Narrator	English dub	
2025	Octopath Traveler 0	Pius		
2025	Dune Awakening	Alnaem, Thufir Hawat, Ishago Imota, Landsraad Weapons Vendor		
2026	Danganronpa 2×2	Teruteru Hanamura		

=== Audiobooks ===
List of voice performances in audiobooks
Year	Title	Role	Author	Notes	Ref.
2018	Grenade	Hideki Kaneshiro	Alan Gratz	Read with Andrew Eiden	
2022	Star Wars: The High Republic:Tales of Light and Life	Narrator	Daniel José Older		
2025	All-Star Superman	Klyzyzk Klzntplkz	Grant Morrison		
