= List of Kill la Kill episodes =

Kill la Kill
- Cover of the first home media volume
- No. of episodes: 24 + OVA

Release
- Original network: JNN (MBS)
- Original release: October 4, 2013 – March 28, 2014

Kill la Kill is a 2013 Japanese anime television series created and produced by Trigger. The series, directed by Hiroyuki Imaishi and written by Kazuki Nakashima, follows Ryuko Matoi, a girl seeking out the wielder of a scissor blade who murdered her father. Her search takes her to Honnouji Academy, where the student council, led by Satsuki Kiryuin, use powerful uniforms known as Goku Uniforms to rule the school and its city in fear. Teaming up with a living uniform named Senketsu, Ryuko fights against Satsuki and the student council in order to find the answers she seeks.

Kill la Kill aired on MBS' Anime-ism programming block between October 4, 2013, and March 28, 2014, (Note: The series aired in MBS' "Thursday 26:05" time slot (Friday 2:05 a.m. JST). The air dates shown in this list reflect the actual calendar date of broadcast.) also airing on TBS, Chubu-Nippon Broadcasting and BS-TBS. The series was released on nine home media volumes between January 8, 2014, and September 3, 2014, with an original video animation episode included on the final volume. The series is licensed in North America by Aniplex of America and was simulcasted on Crunchyroll, Hulu, and Daisuki.net. In the United States, the anime's English dub aired on Adult Swim's Toonami programming block from February 8 to August 2, 2015. In Australia and New Zealand the series is streamed by Madman Entertainment. The show is available in the United Kingdom by Wakanim and is streamed on the All the Anime website.

The series uses four pieces of theme music: two opening themes and two ending themes. For the first fifteen episodes, the opening theme is "Sirius" (シリウス, Shiriusu) by Eir Aoi, while the ending theme is "Gomen ne, Iiko ja Irarenai." (ごめんね、いいコじゃいられない。; "Sorry, I'm Done Being a Good Kid.") by Miku Sawai. From episode sixteen onwards, the opening theme is "Ambiguous" by Garnidelia, while the ending theme is "Shin Sekai Kōkyōgaku" (新世界交響楽; "New World Symphony") by Sayonara Ponytail.

The title of each episode is named after a Japanese classical pop song selected from within the iTunes collection of Kill la Kill head writer Kazuki Nakashima, an idea which he came up with as he wrote the script.

== Episode list ==
No.	English title Original Japanese title (song references)	Directed by (Note: Information is taken from the ending credits of each episode.)	Storyboarded by	Original release date	English air date (Note: Adult Swim listed Kill la Kill as airing on Saturday at 12:30 a.m. (24:30) EST/PST, which is effectively Sunday. The air dates shown in this list reflect the actual calendar date of broadcast.)
1	"If Only I Had Thorns Like a Thistle..."; Transliteration: "Azami no Gotoku Toge Areba" (Japanese: あざみのごとく棘あれば)	Hisatoshi Shimizu	Hiroyuki Imaishi	October 4, 2013	February 8, 2015
Ryuko Matoi transfers into Honnouji Academy, a high school dominated by its fearsome student council, who wear powerful Goku Uniforms that grant them superhuman abilities. Searching for clues to her father's murder, Ryuko confronts the student council president, Satsuki Kiryuin, demanding information about the owner of the other half of a giant red Scissor Blade she wields. Ryuko is easily beaten by the boxing club captain, Takaharu Fukuroda, who uses the power of his Two-Star Goku Uniform. She returns to her ruined home nearby where she is dropped down a trapdoor by her homeroom teacher, Aikuro Mikisugi. Badly wounded, she lands in a basement and when her blood drips onto a pile of clothes, a living sailor style uniform comes alive and forcibly fits itself onto her. The next day, Takaharu threatens to put Ryuko's friendly classmate Mako Mankanshoku to death for treason. Ryuko arrives to rescue her and confronts Takaharu again, this time using her new uniform's powers to defeat him and destroy his Goku Uniform. Ryuko then questions Satsuki again about the wielder of the other scissor blade, the one responsible for killing her father.
2	"So Sexy She Might Pass Out"; Transliteration: "Kizetsu Suru Hodo Nayamashii" (Japanese: 気絶するほど悩ましい)	Akiko Nakamura	Akiko Nakamura	October 11, 2013	February 15, 2015
Ryuko is fatigued after her battle and flees, passing out and ending up in the care of the Mankanshoku family. That night, Ryuko recalls how she was introduced to the uniform, which she decides to name Senketsu, who was created by her father, Isshin Matoi. The next day, Ryuko comes across the tennis club captain, Omiko Hakodate, who knocks her away when Senketsu fails to activate. She is found by Aikuro, who explains Senketsu is a Kamui that requires her blood to operate, providing her with a glove to help her in this regard. He offers to provide more information about Senketsu in exchange for Omiko's defeat. Ryuko goes to face Omiko which, after some interference from Mako, results in a tennis match between the two. Ryuko gets off to a rough start, but eventually manages to fight back by using her Scissor Blade as her own tennis racket, destroying Omiko's Two-Star Goku Uniform with a powerful serve, winning the match on a technicality. Afterwards, Satsuki herself appears before Ryuko to challenge her to a fight, but Ryuko flees due to the lack of her blood remaining.
3	"Junketsu" (Japanese: 純潔)	Akira Amemiya	Akira Amemiya	October 18, 2013	February 22, 2015
Aikuro tells Ryuko about the Life Fibers that give the Goku Uniforms their unique properties, with Kamui being uniforms made entirely of Life Fibers. He goes on to explain that Isshin entrusted him to give Senketsu to Ryuko following his death. Meanwhile, Satsuki, who is frustrated that Ryuko wore a Kamui before her, puts on a Kamui named Junketsu that has been sealed away by her family. The next day, Satsuki confronts Ryuko in her Junketsu, overwhelming Ryuko with her new power, showing no shame in her highly revealing appearance. After hearing Mako's advice that she should get completely naked, Ryuko comes to understand that she was unwilling to access Senketsu's true powers out of embarrassment, so she fully enables Senketsu to be one with her. She unleashes Senketsu's full power, allowing her to fight on equal ground with Satsuki. After Ryuko vows to crush Satsuki's ambitions in order to get the answers she seeks, Satsuki challenges Ryuko with facing every student she throws at, promising another duel with her if she succeeds.
4	"Dawn of a Miserable Morning"; Transliteration: "Totemo Fukō na Asa ga Kita" (Japanese: とても不幸な朝が来た)	Hisatoshi Shimizu	Hiroyuki Imaishi	October 25, 2013	March 1, 2015
While Senketsu is laundered, Ryuko is faced with "No Tardies Day", a school event where students must avoid expulsion by navigating a trap-filled obstacle course and reach school on time. Ryuko and Mako make their way across the perilous course along with their injured classmate Maiko Ogure, while the Mankanshoku family attempt to deliver Senketsu to Ryuko. After hijacking an armored bus, the girls manage to make it to the school grounds with fifteen minutes left. Mako's dog, Guts, manages to deliver Senketsu to Ryuko. However, Maiko reveals herself to be the head of trap development for the disciplinary committee, having acted injured to get close to Ryuko. She steals Senketsu and puts him on in a bid to overthrow Satsuki. Senketsu stiffens, restraining Maiko, and allows Ryuko to retrieve him. With five minutes remaining, Maiko sets off her last trap; a large platform that rolls the girls all the way back to the start, at the bottom of the city. Ryuko and Mako crash into class in time using an express cable car, while Ira Gamagoori, the disciplinary committee chair and one of the Elite Four, expels Maiko for her high-level treachery.
5	"Trigger"; Transliteration: "Hikigane" (Japanese: 銃爪(ヒキガネ))	Hiroshi Kobayashi	Hiroshi Kobayashi	November 1, 2013	March 8, 2015
A sniper named Tsumugu Kinagase targets Ryuko, but is interrupted by the gardening club president, whom he easily defeats. After dealing with the biology club, Ryuko is attacked by Tsumugu, who holds her down and demands for her to strip and hand over her Kamui to him, but retreats when he is interrupted by Aikuro. That night, Aikuro tells Tsumugu to leave Ryuko alone, but Tsumugu is concerned that Senketsu could be a greater threat than the Kiryuins, as it may corrupt Ryuko. He explains a case in which a Kamui suit betrayed and killed its bearer, which is the reason he desires to take Senketsu away from Ryuko. The next day, Ryuko confronts Tsumugu, but their fight is interrupted by the gardening, rakugo, and poetry clubs. Mako comes to defend Ryuko, explaining to Tsumugu that Senketsu and her are friends that care for each other. Tsumugu tries to attack Ryuko, so Senketsu gives himself up to protect her. Tsumugu comes to understand the bond between Ryuko and Senketsu, and leaves them unharmed. They are confronted by Nonon Jakuzure, one of the Elite Four, but Tsumugu helps the two escape. Afterward, Tsumugu tells Aikuro he is giving Ryuko and Senketsu another chance to coexist, but will destroy the Kamui at the first chance of trouble.
6	"Don't Toy With Me on a Whim"; Transliteration: "Kibun Shidai de Semenaide" (Japanese: 気分次第で責めないで)	Komatsuda Taizen	Komatsuda Taizen	November 8, 2013	March 15, 2015
After Ryuko learns of Aikuro's connection with Tsumugu, she tries to press Aikuro for more information, but does not get much outside of his organization's name, Nudist Beach. Meanwhile, Uzu Sanageyama, another of the Elite Four, gets permission from Satsuki to fight against Ryuko himself. The next day, Uzu challenges Ryuko, facing against her in his Three-Star Goku Uniform, Blade Regalia. He has the advantage due to his fast eyesight reading all of Ryuko's moves, but Ryuko overcomes this by using a part of her uniform to block Uzu's vision, allowing her to defeat him and destroy his uniform. Refusing to give up, Uzu proves his might to Satsuki, by undergoing an operation that leaves his eyes shut. Satsuki approves another fight between him and Ryuko. With his vision gone, Uzu's other senses connect more effectively with the Blade Regalia uniform, allowing him to completely overwhelm Ryuko, leaving Ryuko severely beaten. However, before Uzu can deliver the final blow, his Goku Uniform overheats due to him being more powerful than it can handle, giving Ryuko the opportunity to escape.
7	"A Loser I Can't Hate"; Transliteration: "Nikumi Kirenai Rokudenashi" (Japanese: 憎みきれないろくでなし)	Yuzuru Tachikawa	Yuzuru Tachikawa	November 15, 2013	March 22, 2015
Hearing about how many students have been starting their own clubs to become eligible to get better uniforms, and thus better living conditions, Ryuko decides to start her own fight club. As Ryuko increases the club's reputation by defeating other club presidents, Mako, who was assigned as the president, manages to earn a One-Star Goku Uniform, upgrading the Mankanshoku family to a better apartment. Mako's determination to preserve her family's newfound happiness moves the family up to an even more luxurious lifestyle. However, Ryuko starts to feel lonely as Mako has lost her charismatic personality, and the other family members indulge in their new luxurious habits. Realizing things were better before, Ryuko decides to resign from the fight club. However, Satsuki gives Mako a Two-Star Goku Uniform, telling her to defeat Ryuko if she wants to keep her life of luxury, and receive a Three-Star Goku Uniform in return. Blinded by her greed, Mako mercilessly attacks Ryuko. However, Ryuko appeals to their strong friendship, and stops responding to Mako's attacks. Seeing Ryuko injured and unresponsive makes Mako realize how her dream of a better life has separated her from Ryuko and her family, so she tearily apologizes, and allows Ryuko to destroy her Goku Uniform. An impressed Aikuro rejoices at Mako's strong willpower, as Satsuki is left shocked. The whole Mankanshoku clan apologizes to Ryuko, and return to their happy, chaotic lifestyle in the slums, together as a family again. Meanwhile, Satsuki reveals that by using Ryuko to purge the weaker clubs, she will restructure the student council by holding a snap election.
8	"I Will Wipe My Own Tears"; Transliteration: "Ore no Namida wa Ore ga Fuku" (Japanese: 俺の涙は俺が拭く)	Koji Aritomi	Kazuya Sakamoto	November 22, 2013	March 29, 2015
Satsuki announces her new Naturals Election scheme where students must survive a seven-day battle royal to earn Goku Uniforms. Meanwhile, Ryuko takes Mako to the ruins of her old house, where she shares about the circumstances surrounding her father's death. Finding no further clues, Ryuko and Mako head home, but their scooter runs out of gas. While pushing their scooter up the road, they are found by Ira, who offers to help them, as he is outside Academy grounds. During their ride, they are attacked by the automotive and airsoft clubs. Ira absorbs the hits, which power up his Goku Uniform, and lays waste to his opponents. He then leaves them at a gas station, but not before warning Ryuko that they will have their fight at the end of the seven-day trial. The next week, Satsuki has the remaining contenders scramble onto pillars in a king of the hill game, but Ryuko and the Elite Four easily secure their positions. There, Satsuki declares that Ryuko must defeat each of the Elite Four in exchange for details concerning her father's death, with her first opponent being Ira.
9	"A Once in a Lifetime Chance"; Transliteration: "Chansu wa Ichido" (Japanese: チャンスは一度)	Hiroshi Ikehata	Hiroshi Ikehata	November 29, 2013	April 5, 2015
As Ryuko awaits the time for her battle against Ira, Aikuro asks her to drop out of the match, warning that she is not ready to face the Elite Four, to which she naturally declines. The battle soon begins, with Ira activating his Shackle Regalia, attacking himself in order to provide the power needed to transform into Scourge Regalia. Ryuko finds that the Shackle Regalia also serves as an armor protecting its Life Fibers, and is unable to damage the Shackle Regalia without powering up the Scourge Regalia form. Undeterred, Ryuko keeps on attacking, forcing Ira to bring out Scourge Regalia's full power, and he attempts to forcefully mold Ryuko into a model student. However, Senketsu sets a plan into motion by pulling Ryuko out of her synchronized mode, allowing her to use Senketsu to bite down on one of Ira's cloth shackles. Ira then retracts the shackle deep within him and attempts to suffocate Ryuko, but she activates her suit, which pierces through Ira's armor, enabling her to destroy it when it's vulnerable.
10	"I Want to Know More About You"; Transliteration: "Anata o Motto Shiritakute" (Japanese: あなたを・もっと・知りたくて)	Yoshihide Ibata	Yuichiro Hayashi	December 6, 2013	April 12, 2015
Next up, Ryuko battles Houka Inumuta, who uses his Three-Star Goku Uniform, Probe Regalia, to analyze Ryuko's fighting abilities and to anticipate her movements. When Ryuko counteracts this by fighting haphazardly, Houka resorts to Optical Camouflage, cloaking himself and fighting her while invisible. Ryuko counters again by expanding and draping Senketsu's eye across the battle arena, which leaves him unable to evade, and then swatting the entire platform. Unwilling to lose the data he has gathered on Senketsu, Houka forfeits the match before Ryuko can destroy his uniform. Nonon, who is up next to fight, activates her Three-Star Goku Uniform, which initially is an array of speakers that attacks with sound called Symphony Regalia Grave, but later transforms into a hovering airship called Symphony Regalia Presto. She attempts to eliminate Ryuko by destroying the battle arena, but Ryuko activates a new aerial form, Senketsu Shippu, to remain in the match. Troubled by how quickly Senketsu has been evolving, Aikuro contacts Tsumugu, who makes his way to Honnouji Academy.
11	"I'm Not Your Cute Woman"; Transliteration: "Kawaii Onna to Yobanai de" (Japanese: 可愛い女と呼ばないで)	Akira Amemiya, Tetsushimizu Hisatoshi	Akira Amemiya	December 13, 2013	April 19, 2015
Although Ryuko tries to take advantage of her flight and goes straight for Satsuki, Nonon intervenes until Ryuko destroys Nonon's airship with her own missile. However, Nonon puts on an encore performance unleashing her uniform's second form, Symphony Regalia Da Capo, using its music to disrupt Ryuko's communication with Senketsu. However, Ryuko manages to defeat Nonon and destroy her uniform by using Senketsu Mubyoshi to negate and repel the sound waves back at her. Meanwhile, Tsumugu delivers a peculiar bullet to Aikuro, who is prepared to use it on Ryuko should the need arise. Just as Ryuko and Uzu begin their re-match, a mysterious girl appears between them, whom Satsuki recognizes as Nui Harime, the Grand Couturier of the Revocs Corporation owned by her mother, Ragyo Kiryuin. Nui instantly pulls apart Uzu's uniform by breaking its Banshi, the Life Fiber that holds the uniform together. Receiving permission to fight Ryuko from a disconcerted Satsuki, Nui pulls out a purple scissor blade and tells Ryuko that she is the one who killed Isshin, sending Ryuko into a fury.
12	"Spit Your Sadness Away"; Transliteration: "Kanashimi ni Tsuba o Kakero" (Japanese: 悲しみにつばをかけろ)	Tomoya Takahashi	Ken Otsuka	December 20, 2013	April 26, 2015
As Ryuko furiously attacks her, Nui recalls how six months ago, she was tasked with stealing Isshin's latest invention, the Rending Scissors. In his fight with him, her left eye was slashed, but she still managed to kill Isshin and leave with one of the blades, though she did not know of Senketsu's existence. The boiling blood of Ryuko's rage has an adverse effect on Senketsu, causing him to go berserk and consume her, resulting in a monstrous transformation. Mako and her family head towards the scene in order to save Ryuko from dying of blood loss, while Tsumugu tries to draw Nui away to give Aikuro the opportunity to use an adhesive starch bullet on Ryuko. Satsuki dons her Kamui in order to stop Ryuko, but it is Mako who manages to appeal with their friendship, enabling her to calm down, saving her life. Angered by Nui's interference, Satsuki bans her from the school grounds. Several days later, as Ryuko recovers from her battle, Satsuki reveals that she is the one who ordered Nui to steal the Rending Scissors from Isshin, before announcing that Ryuko's battles with the Elite Four have helped her perfect the Goku Uniforms, which they will use in an offensive against other institutions in Japan that oppose them.
13	"Crazy for You"; Transliteration: "Kimi ni Barabara... Toiu Kanji" (Japanese: 君に薔薇薔薇...という感じ)	Yoshiko Mikami, Masahiko Otsuka	Hiroyuki Imaishi	January 10, 2014	May 3, 2015
Satsuki prepares a raid on Osaka, Kyoto, and Kobe, issuing students with new Goku Uniforms created based on the data from Ryuko's battles. Meanwhile, Ryuko continues to sulk over losing control of Senketsu and is unwilling to wear him again. She is approached by Shinjiro Nagita, a suspended student and former newspaper club member, who pleads her to join the fight against Satsuki's war efforts, but she refuses. The next day, Mako gets roped into the raid trip for distributing Shinjiro's underground newspaper on school grounds. Encouraged by Senketsu, Ryuko puts him on to help Shinjiro, who reveals himself to be a disguised Nui, having done so to trick Ryuko into donning Senketsu again. Unable to fight at her full strength out of fear of losing control again, Ryuko is defeated by Nui, who shreds Senketsu to pieces. After Satsuki forces Nui to retreat, she takes all but one of Senketsu's scraps so that they may be distributed to suitable hosts to provide combat data during the raid trip. Left to her bare underwear on the street, Ryuko manages to hold on to Senketsu's last piece, the scarf.
14	"Ride Like the Wind"; Transliteration: "Isoge Kaze no Yō ni" (Japanese: 急げ風のように)	Kazutoshi Ohno	Masayuki (Note: Credited name; Masayuki's full name is Masayuki Yamaguchi.)	January 17, 2014	May 10, 2015
Awakening in Aikuro's hideout, Ryuko discovers Senketsu's consciousness still lives in the scarf that she managed to hold onto. After learning what has happened to his other pieces, Ryuko heads towards the Kansai region, where Satsuki has begun her raid operation. As the Elite Four attack the main schools in the tri-city area, Ryuko interrupts each of their raids and recovers the scraps that have been given to some of the students to increase their power before heading to her next destination, eventually reuniting with Mako in Osaka. With nearly all of Senketsu's pieces gathered in her scissor casing, Ryuko prepares to face Satsuki, who possesses the glove that makes up Senketsu's final piece.
15	"Don't Stop Me Now"; Transliteration: "Dōnimo Tomaranai" (Japanese: どうにもとまらない)	Onishi Keisuke	Shinji Higuchi	January 24, 2014	May 17, 2015
Satsuki confronts the money-hungry boss of Osaka, Kaneo Takarada, who fights against her using his Dotonbori Robo suit. However, he is thwarted by the arrival of the Elite Four and their new Three-Star Goku Uniforms, before being swiftly defeated by Uzu. Ryuko soon arrives on the scene to face against Satsuki, supported by the arrival of Aikuro, Tsumugu, and their organization Nudist Beach. While Nudist Beach fight against the Elite Four, Ryuko uses her own skin as a replacement for the glove so she can transform with Senketsu, allowing her to recover the glove from Satsuki. As Ryuko is disarmed of her scissor, she uses Senketsu to snatch Satsuki's sword from her, bringing the match to a stalemate. Ryuko coerces Satsuki into withdrawing her troops as opposed to simply killing each other, though Satsuki fulfills her objective of destroying Nudist Beach's base. As Satsuki and her troops depart, Aikuro agrees to tell Ryuko everything she needs to know.
16	"The Girl Can't Help It"; Transliteration: "Onna wa Sore o Gaman Dekinai" (Japanese: 女はそれを我慢できない)	Hisatoshi Shimizu	Mahiro Maeda	January 31, 2014	May 31, 2015 (Note: On the night of May 23–24, 2015, Adult Swim ran an episode of Dragon Ball Z Kai followed by a Kill la Kill marathon of episodes 10–15.)
Satsuki returns to the Kiryuin manor to recover from her battle with Ryuko. Impressed by her daughter's prowess with Junketsu, Ragyo shows Satsuki a chamber in their mansion containing the Primordial Life Fiber, a parasitic extraterrestrial that produces other fibers to feed on mankind. She then instructs Satsuki to organize a school festival as the final step in her plan to distribute COVERS, an army of Life Fiber clothing, across the world. Meanwhile, Aikuro and Tsumugu guide Ryuko and Mako to an undamaged section of their underground base. Aikuro reveals that Life Fibers are what induced humanity's evolution into Homo sapiens and the instinct to wear clothes. He explains that every piece of clothing distributed by Revocs, the Kiryuins' clothing company, contains a minimal amount of Life Fibers, and as such, pose an immense threat to humanity if they decide to awaken. He further explains that Isshin, who founded Nudist Beach, created Senketsu for Ryuko to wear and fight the Kiryuins and the Life Fiber threat when she came of age, as she displays a high resistance to Life Fibers. Ryuko is enraged and takes him off, refusing to let him kill his own kind. Deeming them of no more worth, Tsumugu prepares to kill Ryuko and Senketsu.
17	"Tell Me Why"; Transliteration: "Naze ni Omae wa" (Japanese: 何故にお前は)	Yasuo Ejima	Shinobu Yoshioka	February 7, 2014	June 7, 2015
After Mako and Senketsu dissolve the fight between Ryuko and Tsumugu, Aikuro explains to her how Tsumugu's sister, Kinue, died in a Life Fiber experiment, and that Senketsu was made with Ryuko's DNA, hence why only she can wear and communicate with him. Meanwhile, Honnouji Academy makes preparations for a cultural and sports festival to celebrate Ragyo visiting the school. Learning that this a cover up for a final experiment in which all of Honnouji City will be sacrificed to the Life Fibers, Ryuko and the others head for Honnouji Academy, where the ceremony has begun. As Ragyo begins having the Life Fibers devour everyone in the stadium, Ryuko and company arrive on the scene. Satsuki suddenly stabs Ragyo through the back and announces her rebellion against Ragyo and the Life Fibers, revealing this to be the purpose she has built Honnouji Academy for.
18	"Into the Night"; Transliteration: "Yoru e Isogu Hito" (Japanese: 夜へ急ぐ人)	Hiroshi Kobayashi	Hiroshi Kobayashi	February 14, 2014	June 14, 2015
After freeing all the trapped students and citizens from the Life Fibers, the Elite Four fight against Nui while Mako helps with the evacuation. Meanwhile, Satsuki reveals how Ragyo had used her in Life Fiber experiments, along with her newborn sister, who was discarded by Ragyo when the experiment allegedly failed. However, Ragyo, who is able to heal her injuries, breaks free and takes control of the students using Mind Stitching, turning them into her personal army. As Aikuro and Tsumugu fight against them, Ragyo takes control of Ryuko, pitting her against Satsuki, but Ryuko manages to break out of it with her own will. Ryuko fights against Nui while Satsuki goes to fight Ragyo, slicing off her head. However, Ragyo survives due to her Life Fiber being unsevered, completely overpowering Satsuki and stealing her Junketsu for herself. As an army of COVERS appear in the sky, Ragyo pulls out Ryuko's heart, which is covered in Life Fibers, revealing her to be Ragyo's presumed deceased daughter.
19	"Raindrops Keep Falling on My Head"; Transliteration: "Tadoritsuitara Itsumo Amefuri" (Japanese: たどりついたらいつも雨ふり)	Masayuki Ozeki	Akiko Nakamura	February 21, 2014	June 21, 2015
As the COVERS capture the citizens, including Mako, Satsuki triggers an explosion to destroy the stadium. One month later, the Elite Four have joined up with Nudist Beach to fight against the COVERS that have taken over Japan. Ryuko has remained in a coma since the battle, while Satsuki is held captive by Ragyo. In their backstory, Soichiro Kiryuin, who was Satsuki's father and Ragyo's husband, had faked his own death and went under the new identity of Isshin Matoi in order to raise Ryuko and prepare his revenge against Ragyo. Nudist Beach and the Elite Four use devices to extract humans from their COVERS imprisonment, freeing Mako. Ryuko awakens from her slumber and goes on her own rampage. Disgusted at the truth of who she really is, Ryuko vows that she will never put Senketsu on again.
20	"Far from the Madding Crowd"; Transliteration: "Tōku Gunshū o Hanarete" (Japanese: とおく群衆を離れて)	Hiroyuki Oshima	Akitoshi Yokoyama	February 28, 2014	June 28, 2015
Paper clones of Ragyo and Nui appear before Ryuko, coaxing her into travelling to Honnouji Academy to confront them. Unwilling to help anyone, Ryuko heads off alone. After hacking into Honnouji Academy's security cameras and finding Satsuki's location, Ryuko's allies find out from Satsuki's actions that she is planning something. With renewed resolve, they set forth on Aikuro's Naked Sol warship and head towards Honnouji Academy to join the fight. Ryuko arrives and takes on Nui, who is also revealed to have a Life Fiber body. Ragyo ensnares Ryuko and forces her to wear Junketsu, brainwashing by rewriting her memories. Meanwhile, Satsuki escapes from her confinement and rejoins Nudist Beach on the Naked Sol. As Ryuko, now clad in Junketsu, arrives on the ship to attack, Satsuki dons Senketsu and confronts Ryuko.
21	"Incomplete"; Transliteration: "Mikansei" (Japanese: 未完成)	Akira Amemiya	Akira Amemiya, Hiroyuki Imaishi	March 7, 2014	July 12, 2015 (Note: On the night of July 4–5, 2015, Adult Swim hosted a DBZ-a-thon where they played six episodes of Dragon Ball Z and an episode of Attack on Titan.)
Satsuki and Senketsu begin their fight against Ryuko to try to bring her back to her senses, but they are easily overpowered. The Elite Four soon join the battle, distracting Ryuko, while Shiro Iori tries to use his device to remove Junketsu. However, they are interrupted by Nui, who reveals that she has stitched Junketsu to Ryuko's Life Fibers, so forcibly removing it would kill her. Meanwhile, Ragyo uses the power of the COVERS to give the Primordial Life Fiber the power of flight. As Mako tries to reason with Ryuko, Senketsu puts himself onto her to protect her. Satsuki and the others create an opening for Mako and Senketsu to dive inside Ryuko body, helping bring her back to her senses, and allowing her to break free from Junketsu.
22	"Tell Me How You Feel"; Transliteration: "Kuchibiru yo, Atsuku Kimi o Katare" (Japanese: 唇よ、熱く君を語れ)	Hisatoshi Shimizu	Hiroshi Kobayashi, Akiko Nakamura	March 14, 2014	July 19, 2015
After removing Junketsu, Ryuko reunites with Senketsu and battles Nui, during which Ryuko recovers both scissor blades and severs Nui's arms. Nui is rescued by Ragyo's secretary, Rei Hououmaru, while the Elite Four and Nudist Beach take advantage of the COVERS used for her escape to recover their allies and Life Fibers. Afterwards, Satsuki offers to let Ryuko punch her in penance for manipulating her, but the Elite Four stand in the way of her blows. Recognizing that Satsuki also has friends who support her, Ryuko accepts her sister's apology and agrees to fight alongside her. After a reconciliatory celebration, Satsuki explains Ragyo's plan to transmit the Primordial Life Fiber's signal across Earth, absorbing all human beings into a massive Life Fiber cocoon, called the Starseed Cocoon Sphere, to cover the planet. Ryuko and Satsuki head off together to face Ragyo, while Mako, equipped with a new Two-Star Goku Uniform, stays behind with the others to defend the Naked Sol from giant-sized COVERS.
23	"Imitation Gold"; Transliteration: "Imiteishon Gōrudo" (Japanese: イミテイション・ゴールド)	Komatsuda Taizen	Komatsuda Taizen	March 21, 2014	July 26, 2015
Ryuko and Satsuki arrive at the Primordial Life Fiber to battle Ragyo, who wields her own set of blades that prove to be resilient to their weapons. As the Primordial Life Fiber attacks the ship, the Elite Four don new Three-Star Goku Uniforms to assist Mako. During the battle, Ragyo bisects Ryuko, but this is revealed to be a plan laid out by Ryuko, who has Satsuki distract Ragyo while Ryuko heals in the ocean and targets the Life Fiber. Mako uses her sheer willpower, along with the support of the other Honnouji Academy students, to launch the Naked Sol like a giant dagger to split through the Primordial Life Fiber. Spurred on by their arrival, Ryuko manages to cut through the core of the Life Fiber and send it crashing down. Nui finishes preparations for the ultimate Kamui, Shinra-Koketsu, which Raygo wears while using Rei as power source for the Kamui, with Ryuko and the others prepared to settle things with Ragyo once and for all.
24	"Past the Infinite Darkness"; Transliteration: "Hateshinaki Yami no Kanata ni" (Japanese: 果てしなき闇の彼方に)	Hiroyuki Imaishi, Masahiko Otsuka	Yoh Yoshinari, Hiroyuki Imaishi	March 28, 2014	August 2, 2015
Ragyo uses Shinra-Koketsu's powers of Absolute Submission to negate the effects of everyone else's Life Fibers. She then revives the Primordial Life Fiber to fuse everyone with it, but Senketsu, who is immune to Ragyo's ability, manages to knock Rei out of Shinra-Koketsu and restore everyone's power. This allows the Elite Four and Nudist Beach to destroy the satellite uplink while Ryuko and Satsuki deal a critical blow to Ragyo. However, Nui fuses herself with the Primordial Life Fiber and combines with Ragyo, enabling her to launch into space where she activates the satellite manually, covering the world in the Starseed Cocoon Sphere. Ryuko absorbs her allies' Goku Uniforms to form Senketsu-Kisaragi and battle Ragyo, taking her attacks to provide Senketsu with the power needed to absorb Shinra-Koketsu and finally eliminate all of the Life Fibers. Refusing to surrender, Ragyo kills herself by ripping out and destroying her own heart and warning Ryuko that the Life Fibers will return. Senketsu uses the last of his strength to return Ryuko safely to Earth, where she reunites with her friends and family. With the world now free to wear whatever clothes they want, Ryuko begins a new life with Mako and Satsuki sometime after Honnouji Academy sinks into the sea.
OVA	"Goodbye Again"; Transliteration: "Sayonara o Mōichido" (Japanese: さよならをもう一度)	Shimizu Hisatoshi, Amemiya Akira	Akira Amemiya	September 3, 2014 (Home media only)	April 28, 2015 (Home media only)
Two weeks after the battle against Ragyo, a graduation ceremony is held at Honnouji Academy before Satsuki shuts it down as it has served its purpose. The ceremony is interrupted by duplicates of the Elite Four in Goku Uniforms and a Junketsu-clad Satsuki clone. While Ryuko and the real Elite Four fight the doppelgangers, the real Satsuki and Mako are held captive by a revenge-driven Rei, who created the clones. Rei attempts to take control of a giant mech formed from Honnouji Academy itself, but Mako manages to briefly override it, encouraging Ryuko and the Elite Four to defeat the clones. Ryuko is knocked down a pit by Rei, but she hears Senketsu's voice and receives the Rending Scissors, managing to transmogrify them into even larger blades, Scissor Blades Alumni Mode, to finally destroy the mech, while Satsuki convinces Rei to surrender peacefully. Afterwards, everyone bids their farewells to Honnouji Academy as it sinks to the bottom of the sea along with the Rending Scissors, while Ryuko takes comfort from Mako knowing that Senketsu is always with her.
