= Carrie Keranen =

American voice actress

- Carrie Keranen at San Diego Comic Con 2025
- Born: Oak Park, Michigan, U.S.
- Other names: Caroline Lawson; Evelyn Lanto
- Education: University of Michigan
- Occupations: Voice actress, production manager, producer, voice director
- Years active: 2001–present

Carrie Keranen is an American voice actress. Her roles include Misato Katsuragi in the Netflix dub of Neon Genesis Evangelion, Satsuki Kiryuin in Kill la Kill, Casca in Berserk, Mami Tomoe in Puella Magi Madoka Magica, and Alya Césaire in Miraculous: Tales of Ladybug & Cat Noir. In her live-action work, she has played Piper Tate in Untitled Web Series About a Space Traveler Who Can Also Travel Through Time.

== Early life and career ==
Keranen grew up in Oak Park, Michigan. She is of Finnish and Swedish descent through her father, who is half Finnish and half Swedish. She had always been involved in acting, including high school plays, but in an interview with Everything Geek Podcast, she said she was more active in sports. She attended University of Michigan, and originally intended to major in international business with a specialization in Japanese but would be drawn back into doing plays and subbing in for major roles there. She graduated with a BA in theatre and linguistics, and after visiting Europe, moved to New York City to pursue acting. She worked on various acting jobs and did stand-up comedy. In 2003, she was a waitress at Rocco's which was featured in The Restaurant, a reality television series about the launch of celebrity chef Rocco DiSpirito's eatery. The series was broadcast on NBC for two seasons.

Keranen's first voice-over audition for 4Kids was April O'Neil in the 2003 TV series Teenage Mutant Ninja Turtles. She landed supporting roles, and also landed some guest and supporting voices on the Pokémon TV series. When fellow voice actress Tara Sands moved from New York to Los Angeles, Keranen auditioned to voice match Sands' character Mokuba Kaiba in Yu-Gi-Oh!. On her way out of the audition, Keranen started pitching another voice actress for the part, but director Eric Stuart later told her that she was the right person for the role and that he even vouched for her to play the part. That was her first major role as a lead male character. Later in the same season, she also got to voice Kisara, which she said was more typical of the characters and used her natural voice. She also voiced Mina Simington, which she described as "type A but not in a forceful way" and would totally get into something if she had the chance.

In 2010, she moved to Los Angeles, California, to continue working on other projects. She had a recurring role as Kate Harper in the Fringe TV series, and is a member of the Sacred Fools Theater Company. On July 23, 2011, she and fellow voice actress Cristina Vee were panelists at San Diego Comic-Con for Namco Bandai's preview of the Tekken: Blood Vengeance film.

In 2014, Keranen voiced Satsuki Kiryuin, the student council president and antagonist in the anime series Kill la Kill, which ran on Cartoon Network's Adult Swim. Since 2016, Keranen has voiced Alya Césaire in the English version of the French series Miraculous: Tales of Ladybug & Cat Noir. She attended the 2016 San Diego Comic-Con with series creator Thomas Astruc and the cast of Miraculous.

== Filmography ==
=== Anime ===
List of voice performances in anime
Year	Title	Role	Notes	Source
2001	Magic User's Club	Miki Mizusawa		
2002	Berserk series	Casca		
2004–15	Pokémon	Various characters	Debut roles with 4Kids	
2004	Gokusen	Kumiko Yamaguchi	As Caroline Lawson	
2004	Shrine of the Morning Mist	Seiko Rikishi	As Caroline Lawson	CA
2005	Mew Mew Power	Mimi	As Caroline Lawson	
2005	Midori Days	Beniko Iwasaki	As Caroline Lawson	
2005	Piano	Ms. Saito	As Evelyn Lanto	
2005–07	Ah! My Goddess series	Lind, Hikari the Flash	Production manager (season 1); Voice production manager (season 2); As Caroline Lawson or Evelyn Lanto	
2005–06	Yu-Gi-Oh! Duel Monsters	Mokuba Kaiba, Kisara	Season 5 As Caroline Lawson	
2007	Cutie Honey	Honey Kisaragi	Live-action dub	CA
2007	Phoenix	Hinaku		Press
2008	Yu-Gi-Oh! 5D's	Mina Simington, Misty Tredwell		Tweet
2009	Kurokami: The Animation	Shizuka		CA
2010	Slayers series	Ozzel	Revolution and Evolution-R	
2012–15	Puella Magi Madoka Magica	Mami Tomoe	Also movie	
2013	Fate/Zero	Maiya Hisau		Press
2013	Queen's Blade Rebellion	Luna Luna	As Evelyn Lanto	
2014	Magi: The Labyrinth of Magic	Yamraiha		Press
2014	Toradora!	Yuri Koigakubo		Press, Tweet
2014–15	Kill la Kill	Satsuki Kiryuin	Also OVA	
2014–16	Naruto Shippuden	Pakura		Tweet
2015	Yuki Yuna is a Hero	Teacher		
2015	Hyperdimension Neptunia: The Animation	Rom		
2015	Sailor Moon	Avocadora, Sailor Galaxia		Press
2015	Aldnoah.Zero	Femianne		
2015	Durarara!!	Mimizu (Earthworm)	Episode: "Mouth of Honey, a Needle in the Heart"	
2015	The Seven Deadly Sins	Guila		Tweet
2016	Your Lie in April	Hiroko Seto		
2016	Tales of Zestiria the X	Lailah		
2016	Danganronpa 3: The End of Hope's Peak Academy	Mahiru Koizumi	Despair Arc	
2016	Mobile Suit Gundam: Iron-Blooded Orphans	Carta Issue		
2016	Erased	Akemi Hinazuki		
2017	Hunter x Hunter	Baise, Female Operator (Ep. 38), PC Voice (Ep. 42)	2011 series	
2018–19	Bungo Stray Dogs	Ichiyou Higuchi, Elise		
2018	Dragon Pilot: Hisone and Masotan	Remi Kakiyasu	ADR Director	
2019	Neon Genesis Evangelion	Misato Katsuragi	ADR Director; Netflix re-dub	
2020–22	Magia Record: Puella Magi Madoka Magica Side Story	Mami Tomoe		
2020	Persona 5: The Animation	Caroline, Justine, Lavenza		
2020	Great Pretender	Dyshana		
2020	Gundam Seed	Murrue Ramius	ADR Director; HD Remastered dub	
2021–22	Yashahime: Princess Half-Demon	Zero / Otsuyu		
2021	Gundam Seed Destiny	Murrue Ramius	ADR Director; HD Remastered dub	
2021–22	Shaman King	Teruko Amano, Zorya Gagarik, Marion Phauna	2021 series	
2022	Bastard!! Heavy Metal, Dark Fantasy	Sean Ari, Young Kall-Su		
2023	Berserk: Memorial Edition	Casca		
2024	Konosuba -God's Blessing on this Wonderful World!	Sylvia		
2024	The Seven Deadly Sins: Four Knights of the Apocalypse	Guila	Episode: "Freezing, Burning Hearts"	

=== Animation ===
List of voice performances in animation
Year	Title	Role	Notes	Source
2004–06	Teenage Mutant Ninja Turtles	Ananda, Angel (Season 7), others		Press
2006–08	Kappa Mikey	Mitsuki	As Evelyn Lanto	
2007	Ellen's Acres	Ellen's Mom	As Evelyn Lanto	
2009–2012	Huntik	Narrator		Press, Tweet
2015–present	Miraculous: Tales of Ladybug & Cat Noir	Alya Césaire / Rena Rouge / Scarabella	6 seasons	
2016	Mr. Pickles	Lisa Gabagoolie	Ep. "Fish?"	
2017–18	OK K.O.! Let's Be Heroes	Yellow Technique, Giant Robot		
2021–23	DreamWorks Dragons: The Nine Realms	Wilma Sledkin		

=== Film ===
List of voice performances in film
Year	Title	Role	Notes	Source
2009	Pokémon: Arceus and the Jewel of Life	Sheena, Kiko	As Evelyn Lanto; Credited under "Featuring"	Press, Tweet
2011	Tekken: Blood Vengeance	Ling Xiaoyu		
2012	First Squad	Zena	As Evelyn Lanto	
2012–14	Berserk: The Golden Age series	Casca	As Carolyn Keranen	
2014	Naruto the Movie: Blood Prison	Ryūzetsu		
2014	Time of Eve: The Movie	Sammy	As Elizabeth Boyle	
2015	The Last: Naruto the Movie	Tenmonkata, Kunoichi		
2017	Sailor Moon R: The Movie	Xenian Flower	Viz Media dub	
2017	K: Missing Kings	Seri Awashima	Replacing Tara Platt	
2019	Evangelion Death (True)^{2}	Misato Katsuragi	ADR Director; Netflix re-dub	
2019	The End of Evangelion	Misato Katsuragi	ADR Director; Netflix re-dub	
2019	Konosuba -Gods' Blessing on this Wonderful World!- Legend of Crimson	Sylvia		
2021	The Seven Deadly Sins: Cursed by Light	Guila		
2023	Ladybug & Cat Noir: The Movie	Alya Césaire	English dub	
2024	Sailor Moon Cosmos	Sailor Galaxia	Parts 1 and 2	

=== Video games ===
List of voice performances in video games
Year	Title	Role	Notes	Source
2004	Red Dead Revolver	Annie Stoakes, Bargirls, Natalie Kelley		Press
2009–17	League of Legends	Luxanna Crownguard (Lux), Emilia LeBlanc (LeBlanc)		Press
2010	Shira Oka: Second Chances	Kiku		In-game credits
2011–present	Hyperdimension Neptunia series	Red, Rom, Vert	Replaced Tara Platt as Vert since Megadimension Neptunia VII	Press
2013	Killer Is Dead	Moon River, Natalia		
2014	D4: Dark Dreams Don't Die	Peggy Young		
2014	Danganronpa 2: Goodbye Despair	Mahiru Koizumi		Press, Tweet
2015	Tales of Zestiria	Lailah		Press
2015	Star Wars Battlefront	Female Rebel		Press, Tweet
2015	Xenoblade Chronicles X	Irina Akulov		
2015	The Legend of Heroes: Trails of Cold Steel	Sara Valestein		
2016	The Legend of Heroes: Trails of Cold Steel II	Sara Valestein		
2017	Fire Emblem Heroes	Gunnthrá, L'Arachel	Post-launch role	
2017	Persona 5	Caroline, Justine, Lavenza	Uncredited for Lavenza	
2018	BlazBlue: Cross Tag Battle	System No. XX		Tweet
2018	Valkyria Chronicles 4	Selvaria Bles		
2018	Persona 5: Dancing in Starlight	Caroline, Justine, Lavenza	Uncredited for Lavenza	Tweet
2019	Judgment	Amane		
2019	Kill la Kill: If	Satsuki Kiryuin		
2019	Daemon X Machina	Guns Empress		
2020	Persona 5 Royal	Caroline, Justine, Lavenza	Uncredited for Lavenza	
2020	Genshin Impact	Ying'er		Tweet
2020	The Legend of Heroes: Trails of Cold Steel IV	Sara Valestein		
2020	Sakuna: Of Rice and Ruin	Myrthe		
2021	Persona 5 Strikers	Lavenza		
2021	Earth Defense Force: World Brothers	Vogel 7, Attack Satellite Control Team		
2023	The Legend of Heroes: Trails into Reverie	Sara Valestein, Pruna		
2023	Persona 5 Tactica	Lavenza		
2024	Granblue Fantasy: Relink	Additional voices		
2025	Yakuza 0 Director's Cut	Additional voices		
2025	Digimon Story: Time Stranger	Additional voices		
2026	Yakuza Kiwami 3 & Dark Ties	Additional voices		
2026	Danganronpa 2×2	Mahiru Koizumi		

=== Live-action ===
List of acting performances in film and television
Year	Title	Role	Notes	Source
2003–04	The Restaurant	Herself (Waitress)	2 seasons	
2009	Fringe	Kate Harper	Episode: "Inner Child"	
2012–present	Untitled Web Series About a Space Traveler Who Can Also Travel Through Time	Piper Tate	Web series	
