= Untitled Web Series About a Space Traveler Who Can Also Travel Through Time =

2012 web series

- Genre: Web series
- Created by: Travis Richey
- Directed by: Vincent Talenti; Nicholas Acosta
- Starring: Travis Richey; Carrie Keranen; Eric Loya
- Opening theme: "UWSAASTWCATTT Opening Score"
- Composer: Brian Giovanni
- Country of origin: United States
- Original language: English
- No. of seasons: 1
- No. of episodes: 7

Production
- Executive producer: Travis Richey
- Producer: Golan Ramras
- Production locations: Los Angeles, California
- Camera setup: Single-camera
- Running time: 3–5 minutes
- Production company: Siv-Art Productions

Original release
- Release: September 10 – October 15, 2012

Untitled Web Series About a Space Traveler Who Can Also Travel Through Time (UWSAASTWCATTT), also known as Inspector Spacetime, is an American adventure-sci-fi web series created by Travis Richey, and based on the television comedy series Community. The series is based on a fictional series first mentioned during the episode "Biology 101" of Community. Inspector Spacetime is, by itself, a Doctor Who parody. UWSAASTWCATTT follows The Inspector, a character that can travel through time and space by way of a red BOOTH (Bio Organic Omnidirectional Time Helix), a special space/timeship similar in some ways to the TARDIS. Reception for the series has been positive, with USA Today including it in their "Best of TV on the Web in 2012" list. The series had only one season but production of the second season shifted to make a feature film based on the series, titled The Inspector Chronicles, in 2014. Although a crowdfunding campaign was launched that year, the film's further development seems to have been adjourned.

== Production ==
The series was initially pitched to NBC (Community's television network at the time), who appeared uninterested. Richey then began a Kickstarter campaign to fund the series, which was successful. After an animated teaser episode for the series was produced, NBC requested the production be cancelled. Richey continued with the series, but with references to the name 'Inspector Spacetime' removed and the appearance of the character altered. The series' name was then changed to Untitled Web Series About a Space Traveler Who Can Also Travel Through Time.

The second season began shooting in April 2013, with the announcement that Mayim Bialik would be joining the series as the voice of the time machine. In July 2013, it was also announced that Star Trek: Voyager alum Robert Picardo would also be joining the cast for season two. It was later announced that the second season would become a feature film titled The Inspector Chronicles. Sylvester McCoy joined the cast as Uncle Roderick. A crowdfunding campaign on Indiegogo funded development.

== Cast ==
Main cast as listed on the official website:

- Travis Richey as The Inspector
- Carrie Keranen as Piper Tate
- Eric Loya as Boyish the Extraordinary

== Reception ==
The series is said to have started as a "running gag". Paul Booth, in his 2015 book Playing Fans: Negotiating Fandom and Media in the Digital Age, stated that the pastiche "demonstrates the potential for a more nuanced examination of fan affect in industrial practices."
