= VVVVID =

Italian video on demand service

- Available in: Italian
- Headquarters: Rome, {{{location_country}}}
- Creator: Mperience
- Website: https://www.vvvvid.it
- Registration: Required
- Launched: April 2014
- Current status: Offline

VVVVID (pronounced vid) is an Italian video on demand service and a virtual community, with an offering that includes international movies, anime, series, music videos, and short thematic videos. VVVVID's service is free of charge and available exclusively in Italy on the Web and via dedicated apps for iPad and for Android smartphones and tablets. Registration is required.

In December 2014, for the first time in Italy, VVVVID has streamed the Italian dubbed version of the Japanese animated series Tokyo Ghoul, without any previous airing on traditional TV, followed in July 2015 with Tokyo Ghoul √A, in January 2016 by One-Punch Man and Prison School, and in October 2016 by Tokyo Ghoul's 2 OVA and All Out!!, in December 2016 by Parasyte and Death Parade, in June 2017 by The Dragon Dentist, in July 2017 by Drifters and the last 6 episodes of Hellsing Ultimate, in October 2017 by Fate/stay night: Unlimited Blade Works and the second season of Attack on Titan. In May 2018, Kill La Kill premiered on the platform, followed by My Hero Academia in August 2018. January 2020 saw the Italian-dubbed premiere of Demon Slayer: Kimetsu no Yaiba. In winter of the same year, they stream Magia Record.

As of 23 July 2024, the platform is not listed on search engines anymore and is allegedly in maintenance. Fears have been expressed by users and past collaborators that this could be a prelude to a definitive closure.

== See also ==
- Digital television
