= Kill la Kill: If =

2019 video game

Kill la Kill: IF
- Developer: A+ Games
- Publishers: JP/NA: Arc System Works; EU: PQube
- Director: Hideaki Mizota
- Platforms: PlayStation 4 Nintendo Switch; Windows
- Release: JP: July 25, 2019; WW: July 26, 2019
- Genre: Fighting
- Modes: Single-player, multiplayer

Kill la Kill: If (also known as Kill la Kill the Game: If and stylized as Kill la Kill: IF) is a 3D fighting game based on the Kill la Kill anime television series, released on July 25, 2019 in Japan and the following day in North America and Europe. The game was developed by A+ Games, working closely with both the publisher Arc System Works and the original animation studio Trigger.

Design of the game focused on accessibility for a wide audience, featuring simple, easy to learn combat mechanics and an emphasis on the single-player story mode. The plot follows a "What if?" story line where main character Satsuki Kiryuin is the protagonist instead of Ryuko Matoi. IF received overall mixed reviews from critics.

== Gameplay ==
Combat centers around the fundamental combination of short-range attacks, long-range attacks, and guard break attacks. These core elements are supplemented by movement options and special attacks. For movement, the player is able to roam freely around the fighting arena, as well as perform an air dash which brings the player directly to the opponent.

With the addition of dodging and guarding, a basic rock-paper-scissors relationship is formed where blocks stop attacks, guard breaks beat guards, and dodges avoid guard breaks. Special attacks are high damage moves which require charging a special gauge through dealing/taking damage. Using a special attack will also cause a short cut scene to play with an animation of the character performing the special move.

The game features eight playable characters: Ryuko Matoi, Satsuki Kiryuin, Nonon Jakuzure, Ira Gamagoori, Houka Inumuta, Uzu Sanageyama, Nui Harime, and Ragyo Kiryuin. Two additional characters, Nudist Beach D.T.R. and Mako Mankanshoku, were added to the game via free updates. Each of the playable characters have a completely unique fighting style determined by their respective implementations of the core move set (short/long-range attacks, break, special).

For example, Gamagoori has an additional "damage gauge" which charges up upon taking damage when in a special form; the act of switching forms replaces his long-range attack. Charging the damage gauge increases damage dealt, which can be done intentionally by whipping himself, sacrificing hit points for greater damage. Another example is Inumuta, whose long-range attacks charge a unique "analysis gauge", used to increase the damage of break attacks or cancel the opponent's specials.

The game has several playable modes, including story mode, local versus, online versus, a few practice modes, and a couple additional challenge modes. By default, only the story mode is playable, with the rest being unlocked after playing through the first few chapters of the story which act as the game's tutorial. The story mode contains a variety of battle types, including 1v1 duels, three-way battles, and one vs. many brawls against the Cover enemy type. The local and online versus modes are 1v1 duels only, typical for many fighting games. The brawl battles from the story mode reappear in the additional Cover Challenge mode, where the player has to fight off hordes of mindless enemies.

== Story ==
The story in the game features an entirely original, alternate version of the plot in the anime series, written under the supervision of the anime scenario writer Kazuki Nakashima. The story is split in two chapters, initially branching from the 8th episode of the anime. The first chapter follows a "What if?" story line with Satsuki Kiryuin as the protagonist, instead of the original protagonist Ryuko Matoi. The second chapter does follow Ryuko, continuing to explore alternate scenarios of the story in the show.

== Development ==
The idea for turning the Kill la Kill anime series into a fighting game first came when a producer at Arc System Works posted a tweet about their enjoyment of the show. This led to a meeting with the Kill la Kill rights holder, but nothing happened initially as Arc Systems were busy working on other projects. Roughly a year later, another meeting was held to revisit the idea, where A+ Games were brought on to the project, having worked with Trigger before on the game Little Witch Academia: Chamber of Time. Development was tumultuous in the early stages, with the game's original director being switched out for the final Hideaki Mizot, and the team pivoting two or three times on the game idea.

Much of the difficulty came from the close involvement of both Arc System Works and studio Trigger, with Mizota commenting that "in terms of development and working with either team was about 100 times more difficult than Little Witch Academia". In particular, Trigger had unusually deep involvement with the game's development, often requesting highly detailed changes to the team at A+ Games. After a few years of development, the first announcement for the game happened on June 16, 2018, following a countdown website launched by Studio Trigger. More details, including an announcement trailer, were revealed in July at that year's Anime Expo. The final release date was announced on March 20, 2019.

== Reception ==
Kill la Kill the Game: IF received "mixed or average" reviews for the Nintendo Switch version, according to review aggregator website Metacritic. Many sites praised the visual style and animations as a standout feature of the game; a review by Mike Epstein from IGN describes the game having "an elegant cel-shaded artstyle" with animation that "feel[s] like watching an anime in its rare, exciting moments".

Outside the visuals, the fighting mechanics are commonly criticized for lacking depth, resulting in a shallow experience. Lewis White of Nintendo Life deemed it "one of the weakest fighters we've played in quite some time", especially when comparing it to other critically acclaimed fighting games from the publisher Arc System Works such as BlazBlue and Guilty Gear.

Another point of criticism is the game's overall lack of content, stemming from the short story mode, small roster of playable characters, and small selection of fighting arenas. Reviewers also commented on problems with the game's camera losing track of the player, particularly during group battles in the story mode.
