= List of Kill la Kill characters =

The anime series Kill la Kill, produced by Trigger, features a cast of characters with a variety of designs and abilities. Honnouji Academy (本能字学園, Honnōji Gakuen) is a fictional high school situated in Tokyo Bay, Japan. The characters consist mainly of students who wear Goku Uniforms (極制服, Gokuseifuku; lit. "high quality uniform", from gokusei (極製) + seifuku (制服)), which give their wearers superhuman abilities. The protagonist Ryuko Matoi is a transfer student who searches for her father's killer, teaming up with one of her new classmates, Mako Mankanshoku, as they fight against the iron-fisted and hot-tempered student council president, Satsuki Kiryuin, and her mother, Ragyo Kiryuin's, fashion empire.

== Main characters ==
=== Ryuko Matoi ===
Voiced by: Ami Koshimizu (Japanese); Erica Mendez (English)

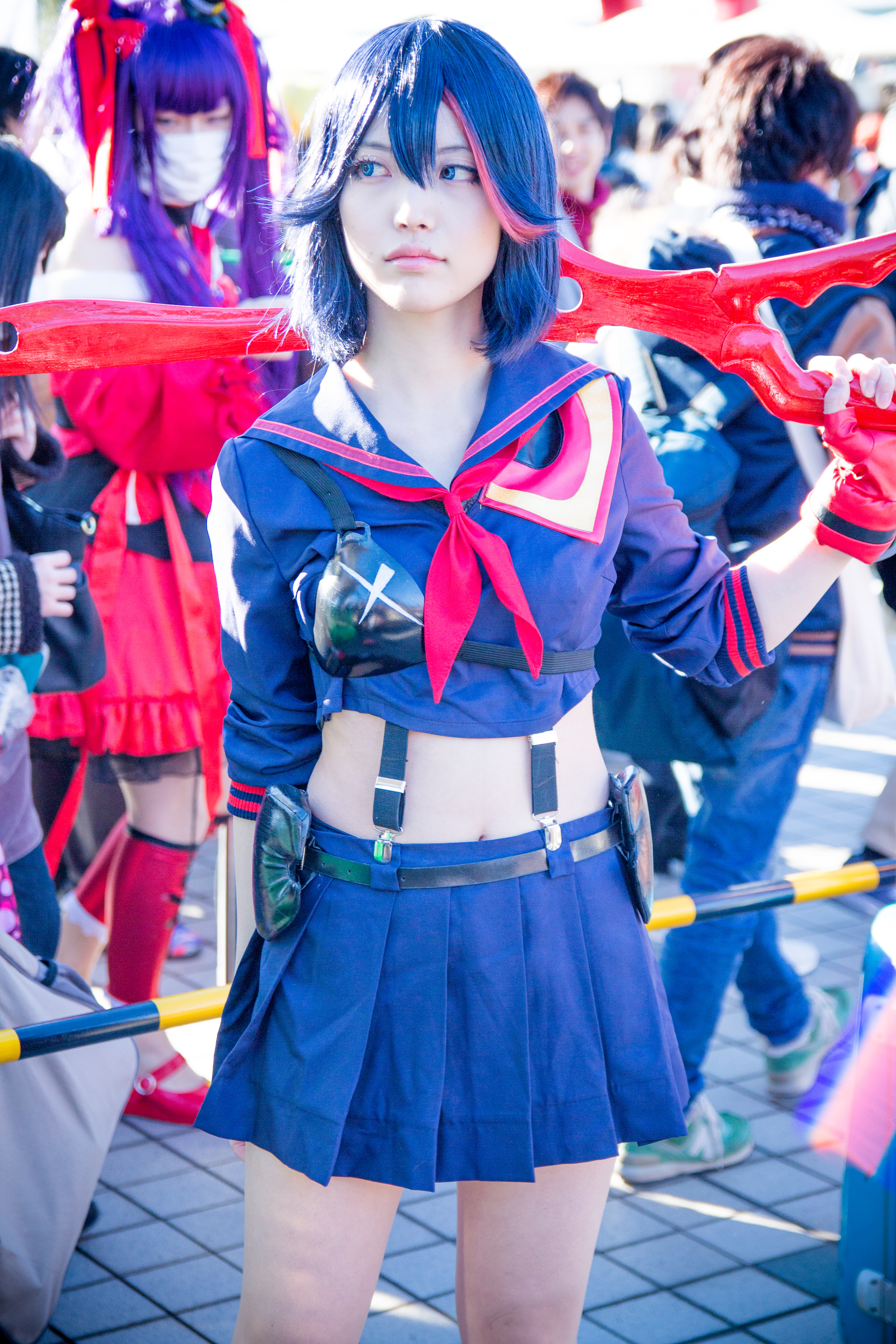
A cosplayer dressed as Ryuko Matoi wearing Senketsu in 2016

Ryuko Matoi (纏 流子, Matoi Ryūko) is a 17-year-old schoolgirl and the protagonist of the series, who transfers to Honnouji Academy to find the one who murdered her father, Isshin Matoi. She possesses the Scissor Blade, one half of the Rending Scissors (断ち斬りバサミ, Tachikiri Basami) that Isshin created to destroy uniforms empowered by Life Fibers.^{[ep 1]} At the start of the series, she acquires a special "kamui" uniform named Senketsu,^{[ep 3]} which grants her special abilities.^{[ep 1]} She lives with the Mankanshoku family.^{[ep 2]}

After arriving at Honnouji Academy, Ryuko vows to fight her way up Honnouji Academy and eventually reach Satsuki Kiryuin, as she speculates she knows who killed her father.^{[ep 1]} Despite having a strong temper, she forms a friendship with Honnouji student Mako Mankanshoku, who supports her emotionally and calms her down when necessary.^{[ep 1]}^{[ep 7]}^{[ep 20]} ^{[ep 10]} She is initially used by Satsuki and the Final Four, as her fights with them and fellow students help Satsuki improve and perfect the Goku Uniforms.^{[ep 13]} Ryuko is later revealed to be Satsuki's younger sister, who was presumed dead during the battle at the Honnouji Academy Cultural & Sports Grand Festival, and became a human infused with Life Fibers as a result of being experimented on as a newborn baby by their mother Ragyo.^{[ep 18]}^{[ep 19]} She was saved by her father, Soichiro Kiryuin, who assumed the identity of Isshin to raise her protected from Ragyo's reach.^{[ep 19]}

Upon learning of Satsuki's true intentions to overthrow their mother and save humanity, Ryuko allies with her and the Final Four, ultimately managing to save the world from the Life Fiber threat.^{[ep 21]}^{[ep 22]}^{[ep 23]}^{[ep 24]} With the world free to wear normal clothing again, Ryuko starts a new chapter in her life alongside Mako, Satsuki, and her newfound friends in the Elite Four and Nudist Beach.^{[ep 24]}

=== Satsuki Kiryuin ===
Voiced by: Ryōka Yuzuki (Japanese); Carrie Keranen (English)

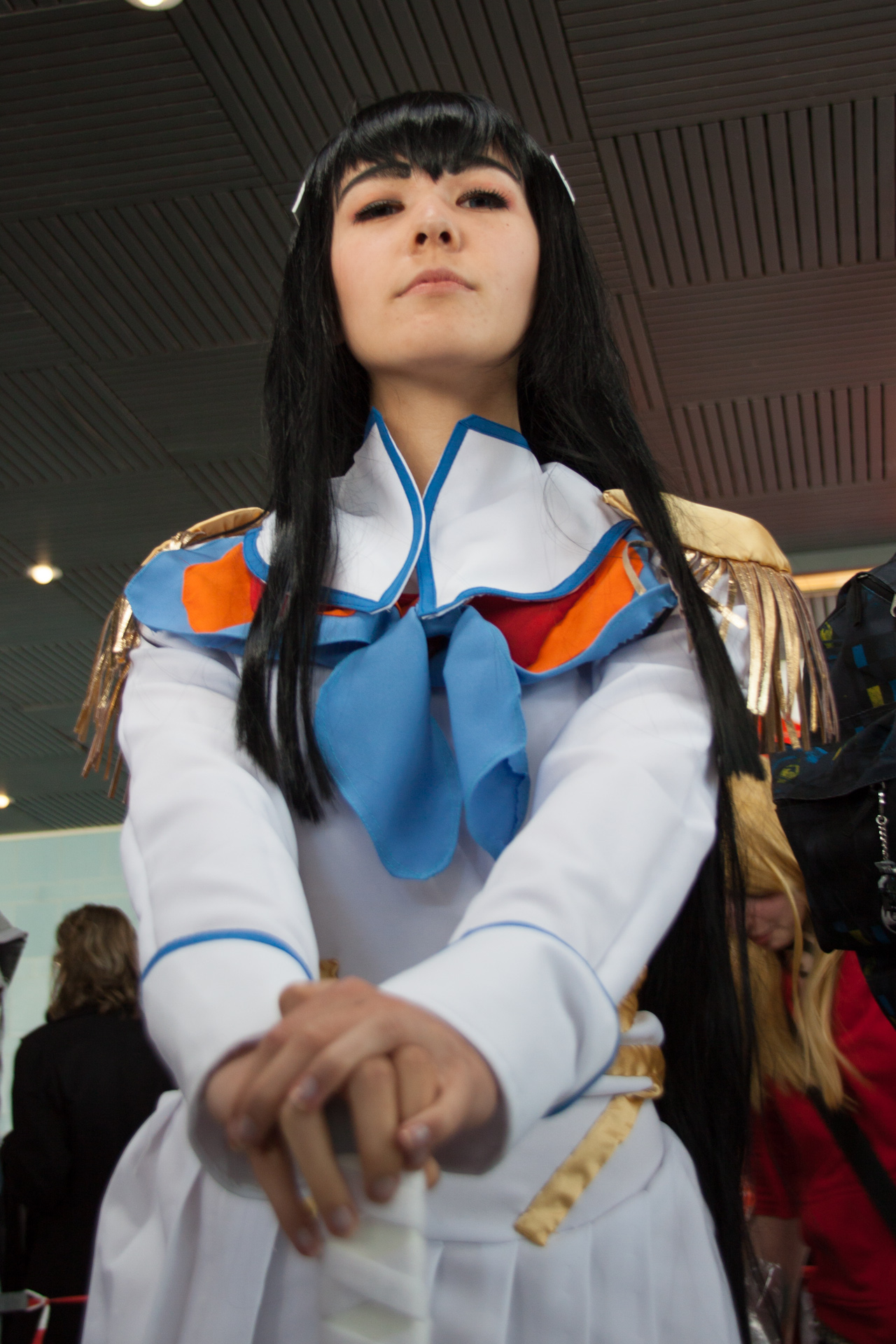
A cosplayer dressed as Satsuki Kiryuin in 2014

Satsuki Kiryuin (鬼龍院 皐月, Kiryūin Satsuki) is an 18-year-old schoolgirl and the president of Honnouji Academy's student council. Her signature weapon is the Life Fiber severing katana Bakuzan (縛斬; lit. 'bind/cut'), administering Goku Uniforms to students using various hierarchical schemes such as a no-late day event and battle royale-esque tournaments such as the Naturals Election.^{[ep 1]}

When Ryuko arrives to Honnouji Academy, Satsuki decides to don the Kiryuin Family's kamui Junketsu (純潔; lit. "purity"^{[ep 3]}) and manages to take command of it through force of will. But unlike Ryuko, who established a symbiosis with Senketsu, Satsuki is unable to use Junketsu's full power and can only use it effectively for short periods of time.^{[ep 16]} Satsuki serves as a major opponent to Ryuko for most of the series, utilizing Honnouji Academy as a means to eliminate her mother and the Life Fiber threat. Satsuki makes her move to assassinate Ragyo during the Honnouji Academy Cultural & Sports Grand Festival to celebrate the schools' subjugating, but is captured while learning Ryuko is her younger sister, who was presumed dead.^{[ep 17]}^{[ep 18]}^{[ep 19]}

After being freed by Nudist Beach with Junketsu modified to be more compliant, Satsuki makes amends with Ryuko before they team up to face Ragyo in the series finale. In the OVA epilogue, Satsuki closes down Honnouji Academy as it had fulfilled its purpose while giving Rei closure.

In the events of Kill la Kill the Game: IF, Satsuki is placed in a dream-based reality while first donning Junketsu, with the events of the series storyline playing out. While facing the Primordial Life Fiber, Satsuki briefly powers up into Junketsu Shinzui (純潔神髄; lit. 'purity essence') before being consumed by her delusion. But Ryuko saves Satuski while loaning her the Rending Scissors to destroy the illusory world. However, this causes her to awaken with no memory of the events.

=== Mako Mankanshoku ===
Voiced by: Aya Suzaki (Japanese); Christine Marie Cabanos (English)

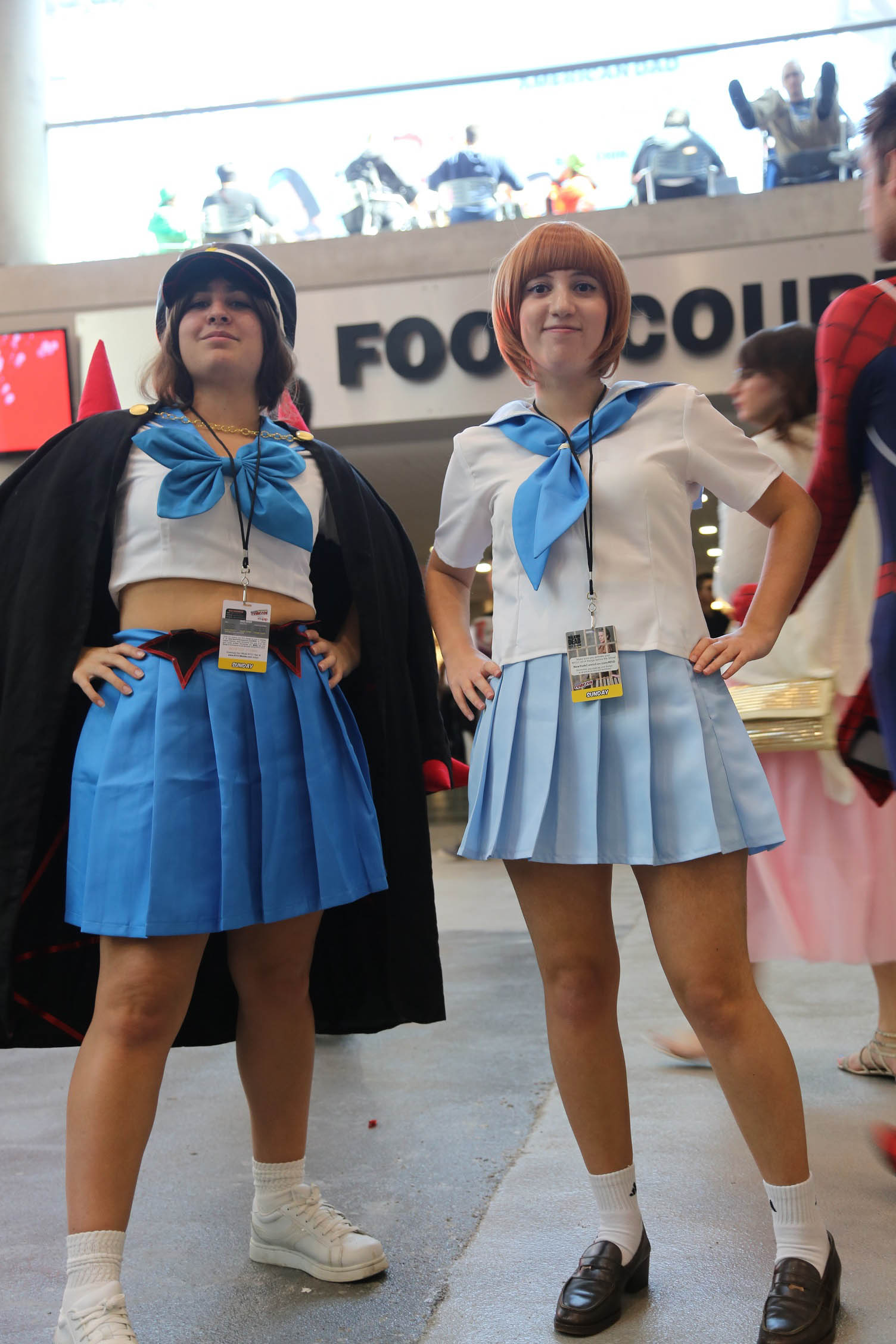
Cosplayers dressed as Mako Mankanshoku at New York Comic Con 2014

Mako Mankanshoku (満艦飾 マコ, Mankanshoku Mako) is an energetic second-year student who is Ryuko's classmate and best friend. She immediately befriends Ryuko upon the latter's arrival at the school.^{[ep 1]} Mako lives with her parents and younger brother in the slums of Honnō City.^{[ep 2]} She is described as an "uber air-head" whose "unbelievable actions never cease to shock and awe the people around her." Despite putting herself in dangerous situations, she has a good heart and cares deeply for Ryuko, providing her with constant encouragement. Senketsu notes that Mako is vital for getting Ryuko to relax.^{[ep 3]}^{[ep 10]}

When she runs the Fight Club, she receives a two-star Goku Uniform styled like that of a delinquent.^{[ep 7]} She later gets a second copy of it to wear to help defend the Naked Sol with the Elite Four and other club presidents during the final assault against Ragyo.^{[ep 22]} Her humanity and kindness are often put to the test, like when she is pressured to fight Ryuko to keep her newfound social status, but resists after seeing her injured ^{[ep 7]}, and when she manages to appeal to her friendship with her, calming her down or defending her from danger.^{[ep 5]}^{[ep 12]}^{[ep 21]}

=== Senketsu ===
Voiced by: Toshihiko Seki (Japanese); David Vincent (English)

Senketsu (鮮血, Senketsu; lit. 'fresh blood')^{[ep 3]} is a talking sailor uniform that Ryuko finds beneath her house. He is a kamui (神衣; lit. "Godrobe"), an outfit made entirely of Life Fibers, which provides its wearer with superhuman abilities in exchange for their blood. Initially, it absorbs a large amount of her blood and only allows her to act for a limited time. However, it is soon able to fully synchronize with Ryuko as she gets over her embarrassment of wearing such a skimpy outfit.^{[ep 3]} Whenever Ryuko destroys a Goku Uniform, Senketsu absorbs its Life Fiber.^{[ep 3]} Mikisugi later reveals that Isshin Matoi designed Senketsu from Ryuko's DNA to enable her to fight against the propagators of the Life Fibers.^{[ep 16]}^{[ep 17]} It was only after the revelation of Ryuko's hybrid nature that Senketsu is revealed to be partially human. Though Ryuko defeats Ragyo, Senketsu starts dissolving from having absorbed both their allies' Life Fiber clothing and Ragyo's as he uses his final moments to safely get Ryuko back to Earth.^{[ep 24]}

== Supporting characters ==
=== Honnouji Academy Elite Four ===
The Honnouji Academy Elite Four (本能字学園四天王, Honnōji Gakuen Shitennō) are the leaders in Satsuki's student council. They wear Three-Star Goku Uniforms.

==== Uzu Sanageyama ====
Voiced by: Nobuyuki Hiyama (Japanese); Grant George (English)

Uzu Sanageyama (猿投山 渦, Sanageyama Uzu) is a former leader of the Northern Kanto Gang who joins Satsuki after she single-handedly defeated his gang. He regulates the athletic clubs at Honnouji Academy, including the Boxing Club and the Tennis Club. Sanageyama specializes in kendo and possesses the three-star Goku Uniform, Blade Regalia (剣の装, Tsurugi no Sō), which takes the form of a large armored bōgu. He initially possesses Tengantsū (天眼通; Clairvoyance), which allows to him to predict his opponent's moves with super fast eyesight. However, after suffering a defeat from Ryuko, he chooses to have his eyes sewn shut, heightening his other senses and giving him a more powerful Shingantsū (心眼通; eyes of the mind), which allows him to perceive things with no blind spots.^{[ep 6]} During the final battle with Ragyo, he unseals his eyes, not wanting to hold back against her. He also receives upgraded uniforms such as Blade Regalia MK.II,^{[ep 6]}^{[ep 11]} Blade Regalia MK.III,^{[ep 15]} and Blade Regalia: Secret Unsealed (剣の装・奥義開眼, Tsurugi no Sō: Ōgi Kaigan).^{[ep 23]}

==== Houka Inumuta ====
Voiced by: Hiroyuki Yoshino (Japanese); Steve Cannon (English)

Houka Inumuta (犬牟田 宝火, Inumuta Hōka) is a hacker who got caught hacking into the REVOCS Corporation by its security staff and was offered a part in Satsuki's group. He is in charge of Honnouji Academy's information and strategy committee, aiding the student council by analyzing the performance of Goku Uniforms and kamui in battle, and helping the Sewing Club with upgraded uniforms. His three-star Goku Uniform, Probe Regalia (探の装, Saguru no Sō), allows him to quickly calculate attack trajectories and use optical camouflage to hide from his opponents.^{[ep 10]} Upgrades include Probe Regalia MK.II, which makes him appear as a polygonal model,^{[ep 15]} and his ultimate uniform of Probe Regalia: Truth Unveiled (探の装・真理究明, Saguru no Sō: Shinri Kyūmei).^{[ep 23]}

==== Ira Gamagoori ====
Voiced by: Tetsu Inada (Japanese); Patrick Seitz (English)

Ira Gamagoori (蟇郡 苛, Gamagōri Ira) is a towering, muscular man who is Satsuki's loyal enforcer who leads the disciplinary committee at Honnouji Academy. His three-star Goku Uniform is the Shackle Regalia (縛の装, Shibari no Sō), which takes the form of bondage gear. By enduring such masochistic attacks, he can activate its second transformation, Scourge Regalia (死縛の装, Shibaki no Sō), which covers his body in thorny whips.^{[ep 8]} His upgraded uniform, Shackle Regalia MK.II, resembles a sarcophagus,^{[ep 15]} and his ultimate uniform is the Shackle Regalia: Persona Unleashed (縛の装・我心開放, Shibari no Sō: Kaishin Kaihō).^{[ep 23]}

During his teenage years where he was the student president of Rinne-Dō Junior High, Ira tried to save a student from a force suicide by two influential students named Hōjō (whose father runs a company) and Imagawa (whose father is the chief of police). He was aided by Satsuki and her servants using their "Kiryuin Deluxee Trampoline" as Gamagori grabs the bouncing student. Gamagori witnesses Satsuki defeating the Hōjō and Imagawa's followers after she and Mitsuzō showed the newspaper article mentioning Kiryuin Corp acquiring Hōjō Corp in a merger and Imagawa's father being arrested for accepting bribes. After a later duel with her, Gamagori became loyal to Satsuki. He is 20 years old, having waited two years after graduating Rinne-Dō Junior High before enrolling at Honnouji to assist Satsuki with her plans. He drives a pink 1959 Cadillac Eldorado.^{[ep 8]}

==== Nonon Jakuzure ====
Voiced by: Mayumi Shintani (Japanese); Sarah Anne Williams (English)

Nonon Jakuzure (蛇崩 乃音, Jakuzure Nonon) regulates the school's non-athletic clubs, such as Gardening Club and Biology Club.^{[ep 5]} Among the members of the Elite Four, she has been with Satsuki since kindergarten and thus claims that she knows her best.^{[ep 5]} She possesses the three-star Goku Uniform Symphony Regalia (奏の装, Kanade no Sō), which transforms into a giant sound system that produces powerful soundwaves and can transform into a flying airship.^{[ep 10]} Later, she receives an upgraded version, Symphony Regalia MK.II, that miniaturizes the airship in a jetpack.^{[ep 15]} Her ultimate uniform is Symphony Regalia: Finale (奏の装・最終楽章, Kanade no Sō: Saishū Gakushō).^{[ep 23]}

=== Mankanshoku family ===
The Mankanshoku family (満艦飾家, Mankanshoku-ka) is Mako's family that resides within Honnō City's slums. They take Ryuko in after the latter transfers to Honnouji Academy.

==== Barazo Mankanshoku ====
Voiced by: Kenyu Horiuchi (Japanese); Michael Sorich (English)

Barazo Mankanshoku (満艦飾 薔薇蔵, Mankanshoku Barazō) is Mako's father. He is a doctor that runs a back-alley clinic in Hannō City's slums. Barazo admits that he may have killed more patients than he has saved.^{[ep 2]}

==== Sukuyo Mankanshoku ====
Voiced by: Yukari Fukui (Japanese); Erika Harlacher (English)

Sukuyo Mankanshoku (満艦飾 好代, Mankanshoku Sukuyo) is Mako's mother. She is a carefree housewife who is kind to Ryuko and makes croquettes with mystery meats.^{[ep 2]}

==== Mataro Mankanshoku ====
Voiced by: Ayumi Fujimura (Japanese); Philece Sampler (credited as Lindsey Eaton)^{[ep 19 credits]} (English)

Mataro Mankanshoku (満艦飾 又郎, Mankanshoku Matarō) is Mako's younger brother. He is a delinquent who initially tries to rob Ryuko when he first encounters her.^{[ep 1]}

==== Guts ====
Voiced by: Katsuyuki Konishi (Note: Originally listed as "?", the voice actor for Guts was revealed to be Katsuyuki Konishi through credits in Episode 25) (Japanese); Derek Stephen Prince (English)

Guts (ガッツ, Gattsu) is the Mankanshoku family pug. He is dressed in a light bluish-grey hooded sweater. In episode 2, Mataro says that they named him Guts "because he eats with a lot of gusto".^{[ep 2]}

=== Nudist Beach ===
Nudist Beach (ヌーディスト・ビーチ, Nūdisuto Bīchi) is an organization that serves as a resistance against the REVOCS Corporation.

==== Aikuro Mikisugi ====
Voiced by: Shin-ichiro Miki (Japanese); Matthew Mercer (English)

Aikuro Mikisugi (美木杉 愛九郎, Mikisugi Aikurō) is Ryuko's enigmatic homeroom teacher. He secretly observes and aids Ryuko by leading her to Senketsu.^{[ep 3]} Whilst generally having the appearance of a frail, shaggy teacher, he is actually a glamorous smooth-talker with a habit of slowly stripping his clothes and making moves on Ryuko whenever they are in private, much to Ryuko's embarrassment.^{[ep 3]} Aikuro reveals to Ryuko the existence of Nudist Beach and his being one of its members (though she did not believe him due to the organization's ridiculous name). Whenever he strips, pink light radiates from his nipples and from his crotch, obscuring them.^{[ep 6]} Mikisugi's character design is based on people such as TM Network's vocalist Takashi Utsunomiya and Kenji Sawada, people who appear smart and good-looking.

==== Tsumugu Kinagase ====
Voiced by: Katsuyuki Konishi (Japanese); Kaiji Tang (English)

Tsumugu Kinagase (黄長瀬 紬, Kinagase Tsumugu) is a scientist at the Nudist Beach organization and an acquaintance of Aikuro who sports a red mohawk on top of short black hair. He bears a strong hatred of kamui, which stems from an experiment where his close sister, Kinue (絹江), died when the kamui she had volunteered to test ran her blood dry.^{[ep 17]} His weapon is a sewing machine pistol that fires needles which severs the connections between the Life Fibers in kamui and Goku Uniforms and their wearers. The needles also act like acupuncture, in that it can immobilize opponents and invigorate them afterward. His catchphrase is "There are two things you need to know" (2つ、いいことを教えてやる, Futatsu, ii koto o oshieteyaru; also "Let me tell you two useful pieces of information").^{[ep 5]}

==== Isshin Matoi ====
Voiced by: Kinryū Arimoto (Japanese)

Isshin Matoi (纏 一身, Matoi Isshin) is Ryuko's deceased father and the creator of Senketsu and the Scissor Blades. He was murdered by Nui, who stole one of the blades while he left the other to Ryuko.^{[ep 12]} Isshin is also the founder of Nudist Beach.^{[ep 16]} He is actually Soichiro Kiryuin (鬼龍院 総一郎, Kiryūin Sōichirō), Satsuki's father and Ragyo's husband, who faked his death and took on a false identity to raise Ryuko.^{[ep 19]}

=== REVOCS Corporation ===
The REVOCS Corporation (リボックス社, Ribokkusu Sha) is a textile company that is owned by the Kiryuin Conglomerate.

==== Ragyo Kiryuin ====
Voiced by: Romi Park (Japanese); Laura Post (English)

Ragyo Kiryuin (鬼龍院 羅暁, Kiryūin Ragyō) is Ryuko and Satsuki's mother and the main antagonist of the series, being both Director of Honnouji Academy and the CEO of the Revocs Corporation which manufactures and supplies a preponderance of the world's clothing with her product laced with Life Fibers.^{[ep 11]}^{[ep 17]} Ragyo has aspirations of ruling the Earth through the Primordial Life Fiber (原初生命戦維, Genshō Seimei Sen'i), the source of all Life Fibers on Earth, turning herself into a human/Life Fiber hybrid to be essentially immortal as long her head is still connected to her body by a single Life Fiber thread or her heart is not destroyed.^{[ep 18]}

One of her abilities is Mind Stitch where she imbued Life Fibers into peoples' heads to control like puppets.^{[ep 18]} She eventually dons the wedding dress-like ultimate kamui, Shinra-Kotetsu (神羅纐纈), gaining the Absolute Domination (絶対服従, Zettai Fukujū) ability which allows her to manipulate anything made of Life Fibers except Senketsu. While Shinra-Kotetsu was originally powered by Rei Honoumaru, Ragyo had it absorb Harime and the Primordial Life Fiber commence her end game. After Ryuko reverses the Life Fiber takeover after Senketsu assimilated Shinra-Kotetsu, Ragyo chooses to crush her heart rather than accept defeat on anyone's terms but her own, warning Ryuko that the other Life Fibers in the universe will eventually come to Earth and finish what she started.^{[ep 24]}

==== Nui Harime ====
Voiced by: Yukari Tamura (Japanese); Stephanie Sheh (English)

Nui Harime (針目 縫, Harime Nui) is the Grand Couturier (High Order Tailor) of the Kiryuin family, initially appearing as a petite twin tailed girl with a parasol and wearing an eyepatch. She has sociopathic tendencies, smiling and acting cheerful even when revealing to Ryuko that she killed her father and stole half of his Rending Scissors, at the cost of her eye.^{[ep 11]} She later reveals that she is actually a human/Life Fiber hybrid that was incubated within the Primordial Life Fiber,^{[ep 20]} with superhuman abilities such as tearing apart Life Fibers in Goku Uniforms and kamuis,^{[ep 12]} manipulating people's minds with Mental Stitching, healing from severe cuts to her body, cloning herself, and changing her appearance.^{[ep 18]} The only times in the series where she loses her cool are when Isshin takes out her eye and when Ryuko severs her arms at the Life Fiber level. She helps create Ragyo's kamui Shinra-Kotetsu and sacrifices herself at Ragyo's request to help the latter attain her ultimate power.^{[ep 24]}

==== Rei Hououmaru ====
Voiced by: Ayumi Fujimura (Japanese); Cristina Vee (English)

Rei Hououmaru (鳳凰丸 礼, Hōōmaru Rei) is a Revocs corporate officer and Ragyo's personal secretary.^{[ep 11]} Rei originally lived in a wartorn African village whose inhabitants were said to have a unique resistance to Life Fibers, saved and adopted by Ragyo.^{[ep OVA]} Believing humanity deserved to be consumed by the Life Fibers, Rei willfully offered herself as a sacrifice to activate Shinra-Kotetsu before being forcefully removed from it.

Following Ragyo's death, Rei attempted to exact revenge by using Life Fiber-based clones of Satsuki and her Elite Four to disrupt Honnouji Academy's graduation ceremony. Though it failed thanks to the efforts of the Elite Four and Ryuko, Satsuki is able to convince Rei to let go of her vendetta and instead help her make the world a better place. Rei joins Satsuki as they flee the sinking island that the academy and city stood on, giving it one final salute with the Elite Four, Iori, Mitsuzo, and the students as it goes to the bottom of Tokyo Bay.^{[ep OVA]}

== Other characters ==
=== Takiji Kuroido ===
Voiced by: Kōsei Hirota (Japanese)

Takiji Kuroido (黒井戸滝司, Kuroido Takiji) is the head steward to the Kiryuin family. He reports directly to Ragyo and takes care of the Kiryuin Mansion. Takiji was among those who were absorbed by the COVERS. Following Ragyo's defeat, his fate is unknown.

=== Mitsuzo Soroi ===
Voiced by: Akio Nojima (Japanese); Doug Stone (English)

Mitsuzo Soroi (揃 三蔵, Soroi Mitsuzō) is Satsuki's personal and trusted butler, having served her since her early childhood. He is also Shiro Iori's uncle. Soroi often serves tea to Satsuki, but he also serves tea to the Elite Four, and later the Nudist Beach members when they go to rescue Satsuki.^{[ep 19]} He wears a three-piece suit.

=== Kaneo Takarada ===
Voiced by: Makoto Awane (Japanese); Ben Diskin^{[ep 15]} (English)

Kaneo Takarada (宝多 金男, Takarada Kaneo) is a money-crazed student council president of Naniwa Kinman High School in the Osaka region, his family's wealth rivals that of the Kiruyins as he secretly funded Nudist Beach. Takarada uses his Takarada-printed money to have locals fight Kiryuin's forces for him when they arrives to both conquer his school and destroy the Nudist Beach base located in the city.^{[ep 15]} After Ragyo and the Covers take over Japan, Takarada spends his remaining fortune to complete Nudist Beach's battleship Naked Sol. He is last seen seeing them off with a respectful salute, wishing them good luck against Ragyo.^{[ep 20]}

=== Honnouji Academy club leaders ===
==== Shiro Iori ====
Voiced by: Yūji Ueda (Japanese); Todd Haberkorn (English)

Shiro Iori (伊織 糸郎, Iori Shirō) is the president of Honnouji Academy's Sewing Club and a member of Satsuki's inner circle as the nephew of Satuski's butler Misuzo.^{[ep 6]} His role in Satsuki's group is to analyze the combat ability of the Goku uniforms he creates and make necessary improvements. While not a combatant, his three-star Goku Uniform Tailor's Regalia (誂の装, Atsurae no Sō) allows him to create numerous Goku Uniforms within minutes.^{[ep 22]}

==== Other club leaders ====
Several of the school's club leaders challenge Ryuko in early episodes of the series. They include:

Takaharu Fukuroda (袋田 隆治, Fukuroda Takaharu)
Voiced by: Mitsuo Iwata (Japanese); Ben Diskin^{[ep 1]} (English)
Takaharu Fukuroda is in charge of the Boxing Club and Ryuko's first opponent, reporting to Uzu Sanageyama. His gloves become iron through his two-star Goku Uniform.^{[ep 1]}
Omiko Hakodate (函館 臣子, Hakodate Omiko)
Voiced by: Chiaki Takahashi (Japanese); Karen Strassman^{[ep 2]} (English)
Omiko Hakodate is the captain of the Tennis Club with a type of lens over her right eye. She has a two-star Goku Uniform where the bottom of her skirt is full of tennis balls.^{[ep 2]}
Maiko Ogure (大暮 麻衣子, Ōgure Maiko)
Voiced by: Marina Inoue (Japanese); Dorothy Elias-Fahn (English)
Maiko Ogure is part of the Discipline Committee. She wears glasses and pretends to be a struggling student that helps Ryuko and Mako to clear the obstacles for No Late Day. In reality, she is the one in charge of setting the obstacles and traps for the disciplinary committee as member of its Trap Department. Maiko gets busted by Ira for conspiring against Satsuki and is expelled.^{[ep 4]}
Kusanosuke Yaguruma (矢車 草之助, Yaguruma Kusanosuke)
Voiced by: Ryo Naitou
Kusanosuke Yaguruma is the general manager of the Gardening Club Terrace. He confronts Kinagase on the rooftop. Kusanosuke wears a blue hat cloth with yellow polka dots and wears a two-star Goku Uniform. His plant weapons resemble carnivorous plants. ^{[ep 5]}
Kusatao Uwabami (蟒 草田男, Uwabami Kusatao)
Voiced by: Norihisa Mori
Kusatao Uwabami is the general manager of the Gardening Club Backyard Garden. He tries to avenge Kusanosuke's defeat. Kusatao wears a yellow hat cloth with pink polka dots and wears a two-star Goku Uniform. His plant weapons resemble vines.^{[ep 5]}
Ryōsuke Todoroki (轟 輌輔, Todoroki Ryōsuke)
Voiced by: Kiyohito Yoshikai
Ryōsuke Todoroki is the president of the Automotive Airsoft Club, which merged the Auto Club with the Airsoft Club. He has flaming red hair. They chase down Gamagoori during the battle royal week of the Naturals Election and are defeated by him.^{[ep 8]}

Some additional club leaders make an appearance in episode 7 when Satsuki offers upgraded Goku Uniforms and perks for club presidents.^{[ep 7]}

Jack Naito (ジャック内藤, Jakku Naitō)
The president of the Knife Throwing Club.
Kagesaburo Kagero (陽炎 陰三郎, Kagerō Kagesaburō)
The president of the Nanjing Lily Club.
Masuyo Watari (渡 益代, Watari Masuyo)
The president of the Tightrope Walking Club.
Maimu Okurahama (御倉浜 舞夢, Okurahama Maimu)
The president of the Folk Dance Club.
Three Toki Brothers (陶器三兄弟, Tōki Sankyōdai)
The president of the Pottery, Arts, and Crafts Clubs.
Aizenbo Fuguhara (河豚原 愛善坊, Fuguhara Aizenbō)
The president of the Ping Pong Club.
Tatamu Otte (追手 タタム, Otte Tatamu)
The president of the Origami Club.

=== Kami-Kobe High School ===
Located in Kobe, the Kami-Kōbe High School (神神戸高校, Kami Kōbe Kōkō) is the target assigned to Ira Gamagōri's party during the Tri-City Schools Raid Trip. With Kobe being a port city, the school building is modeled after a sailing ship. Among its known students are:

Kyuji Obayashi (大林 九二, Ōbayashi Kyūji)
Voiced by: Ryōta Takeuchi
Kyuji Obayashi is the alliance representative of the Kami-Kobe High School Armed Faction in the Kansai region.^{[ep 14]}.
Kenta Sakuramiya (桜宮 健太, Sakuramiya Kenta)
Voiced by: Masaya Onosaka (Japanese); Lucien Dodge (English)
Kenta Sakuramiya is the deputy armed faction alliance representative of the Kami-Kobe High School Armed Faction in the Kansai region.^{[ep 14]}

=== Abekamo Academy ===
Located in Kyoto, the Abekamo Academy (安部加茂学園, Abekamo Gakuen) is the target assigned to Nonon Jakuzure's party during the Tri-City Schools Raid Trip. The student council leaders of Abekamo Academy consist of four guardians, named after the Four Symbols:

Taro Genbu (玄武 太郎, Genbu Tarō)
Voiced by: Rintarō Nishi
The Guardian Student of the North who is dressed as the Black Tortoise.
Jiro Suzaku (朱雀 二郎, Suzaku Jirō) Voiced by: Kenjiro Tsuda (Japanese); Lucien Dodge (English)
The Guardian Student of the South who is dressed as the Vermilion Bird.
Saburo Seiryu (青龍 三郎, Seiryū Saburō)
Voiced by: Hiromichi Ogami)
The Guardian Student of the East who is dressed as the Blue Dragon.
Shiro Byakko (白虎 四郎, Byakko Shirō)
Voiced by: Go Shinomiya)
The Guardian Student of the West who is dressed as the White Tiger.

== Reception ==
Kill la Kill won multiple prizes during the 4th Newtype Anime Awards, including Best Character Design. In the Best Mascot category, Senketsu placed third and Guts placed ninth. In Best Female Character, Ryuko placed second, and Mako placed third. Aya Suzaki, who voiced Mako, placed fourth in Voice Actor Award (female), while Ami Koshimizu, who voiced Ryuko, placed seventh.
