= Tenkai Knights =

2013 Canadian-Japanese children's mecha anime series

- Cover for the show's first rental DVD volume featuring Guren Nash and Bravenwolf.

テンカイナイト (Tenkai Naito)
- Genre: Action, Mecha, Science fiction, Isekai
- Created by: Spin Master
- Anime television series
- Directed by: Mitsuru Hongo
- Produced by: Ryō Sasaki (1); Susumu Matsuyama (2-51); Tomoya Negishi
- Written by: Jin Kanada (1–26); Hiroshi Ōnogi (27–51)
- Music by: MONACA
- Studio: Bones
- Licensed by: NA: Spin Master Entertainment
- Original network: Teletoon (Canada); TV Tokyo (Japan)
- English network: US: Cartoon Network
- Original run: August 24, 2013 – December 6, 2014
- Episodes: 51 + recap
- Manga
- Written by: Ryo Takamisaki
- Published by: Shogakukan
- Imprint: Tentōmushi CoroCoro Comics
- Magazine: CoroCoro Ichiban!
- Original run: April 21, 2014 – March 27, 2015
- Volumes: 2
- Video game

Tenkai Knights: Brave Battle
- Developer: Namco Bandai Games
- Publisher: Namco Bandai Games
- Genre: Action
- Platform: Nintendo 3DS
- Released: NA: October 7, 2014; JP: September 25, 2014; EU: September 26, 2014

Tenkai Knights (Japanese: テンカイナイト, Hepburn: Tenkai Naito) is a 2013 Japanese-Canadian mecha anime series based on a toy line by Spin Master, produced by Shogakukan-Shueisha Productions, Spin Master Entertainment and TV Tokyo and animated by Bones. It was directed by Mitsuru Hongo, with Jin Kanada and Hiroshi Ōnogi handling series scripts, Toshihiro Kawamoto and Shigeru Fujita designing the characters, Takayuki Yanase and Fujirō designing the 3DCG characters and MONACA composing the music. The series officially aired on Cartoon Network in the United States on August 24, 2013, and in Canada on Teletoon on September 28, 2013. After a year, it premiered on TV Tokyo and its affiliate stations on April 5, 2014.

In North America, the toys have been on sale since December 2013.

== Story ==
Eons ago, a cube–like peaceful planet named Quarton is populated by the Tenkai, alien robots who could shape–shift into living bricks. Quarton was ravaged by a war between two opposite factions: the Corekai Soldiers, led by the valiant and fearless Commander Beagle ("Beag"); and the Corrupted Army, led by the ruthless Lord Vilius, who desired to obtain the source of Tenkai energy for his own purposes. However, the only ones who were strong enough to defeat him were the 4 Legendary Tenkai Knights of Quarton: Bravenwolf, Tributon, Valorn, and Lydendor. Facing defeat, Vilius unleashed the mighty Tenkai Dragon, who was later defeated by the 4 Knights where its fragments scattered across the planet. These heroes were never seen again. One year later, Lord Vilius and the infamous Corrupted Army have returned, more powerful than ever before.

Now on planet Earth in the year 2034 within Benham City, four young teenage boys, named Guren Nash, Ceylan Jones, Toxsa Dalton, and Chooki Mason, find an interdimensional portal to Quarton where they are chosen by Boreas of the Guardians to become the new generation of Tenkai Knights and prevent Lord Vilius and his Corrupted Army empire from taking control of both worlds.

During the course of the series, the 4 boys learn about teamwork, friendship, and many other life lessons as they face of against Vilius, his 2 henchmen Slyger and Granox, and soon, Dromus (AKA Gen) and Venetta (AKA Beni).

== Media ==
=== Animation ===
The series first aired in the United States on the cable TV channel Cartoon Network on August 24, 2013, at 7:30 am, and in Canada on Teletoon on September 28, 2013. The English dub is produced by Studiopolis. To coincide with the launch of the property, Spin Master and Kickstart Entertainment produced a 10-episode prequel web-series entitled Tenkai Knights Origins. The series features music by John Majkut and was released onto YouTube as well as the brand's official website between September and December 2013. They also aired as interstitals on Cartoon Network and Teletoon.

In Japan, the television series was delayed until April, airing on the TV Tokyo network beginning April 5, 2014. However, the Saturday 9:00-9:30 slot was a local sales slot, so only TV Aichi and TV Osaka were simultaneously networked with the production station TV Tokyo, while the other three TV Tokyo affiliate stations broadcast it on Saturday mornings at 7:00 (one week later).

A second season of the series was announced to be in development but was cancelled prior to entering production.

=== Toys ===
The Tenkai Knights toy line is produced by Spin Master under the Ionix brand of construction bricks, along with a new Pokémon line. Spin Master refers to Ionix as the next generation of construction, with "Bricks that shapeshift." Their line of products include bricks that look very similar to traditional construction bricks, but actually shapeshift and unfold into unique mini-figures. Spin Master distributes the toys in the United States, Canada and Thailand while Happinet handles the distribution rights of the toys in Japan.

=== Print ===
A manga adaptation of the anime series by Ryo Takamisaki was serialized in CoroCoro Ichiban! beginning with its June 2014 issue, published April 21, 2014. The manga concluded with the March 2015 issue and was later compiled into two tankōbon by Shogakukan, the last of which, released on March 27, 2015, featured an additional 20 pages of material. The series was not released in English, though a French edition was published by Kazé in a four-volume 48-page color comic book format.

Penguin Random House published four novelizations written by Brandon T. Snider, as well as two choose your own adventure books by Ray Santos in 2014 and 2015. iStoryTime released an interactive book on iOS in January 2014.

=== Home video ===
Phase 4 Films distributed a single home video release of the series in Canada and the United States, titled Tenkai Knights: Rise of the Knights. It presents the first several episodes of the show edited together into a movie and was released on DVD as well as digital platforms on February 4, 2014. A manufacture on demand Blu-ray version followed on May 4, 2016.

In Japan, Happinet and Victor Entertainment released the entire series over four DVD box sets between August 2, 2014, and May 2, 2015. The first 18 episodes were also released through six DVDs for the rental market.

=== Music ===
Four pieces of theme music are used for the episodes: one opening theme and three closing themes. The opening theme is "Get the Glory" by Ayako Nakanomori. The first ending theme is "Shunkan Diamond" (瞬間Diamond, Shunkan Diamond; lit. 'Diamond Moment') by Rurika Yokoyama, while the second ending is "Shōri no Hanataba o -gonna gonna be hot!-" (勝利の花束を-gonna gonna be hot!-, lit. 'Victory Bouquet -gonna gonna be hot!-') by Cyntia. The third ending, "Densetsu no FLARE" (伝説のFLARE -, lit. 'Legendary Flare'), is sung by Pile. For the English version, John Majkut composed its opening theme with an instrumental version of the same track used for the credits. The series' background score is composed by Majkut and MONACA of Star Driver fame.

Happinet released an 82-song soundtrack on CD on March 25, 2015, in Japan.

=== Video games ===
On January 30, 2014, Namco Bandai Games announced a video game entitled Tenkai Knights: Brave Battle (テンカイナイト ブレイブバトル, Tenkai Naito Bureibu Batoru) for Nintendo 3DS, released in Japan on September 25, 2014, and in North America on October 7, 2014. It is one of the worst rated 3DS games, with a score of 26 on Metacritic, with the 3rd lowest score for any 3DS game on Metacritic.

On February 27, 2014, Spin Master and Game Pill launched the free-to-play Tenkai Knights: Battle for Quarton game for iOS devices. The game was also available through web browsers via the Unity plug-in. Other browser titles include Bravenwolf's Run, Race to Redemption and Tenkai Boost.

=== Broadcast ===
Country	Title	Network	Release date
United States	Tenkai Knights	Cartoon Network	August 24, 2013
Canada	Tenkai Knights	Teletoon	September 28, 2013
France	Tenkai Knights	Canal J	February 8, 2014
France	Tenkai Knights	Gulli	April 12, 2014
Japan	テンカイナイト	TV Tokyo	April 5, 2014
Australia	Tenkai Knights	GO!	April 14, 2014
Netherlands	Tenkai Knights	Disney XD	June 14, 2014
Italy	Tenkai Knights	K2	June 18, 2014
Germany	Tenkai Knights	ProSieben Maxx	June 27, 2014
South Korea	텐카이 나이트	Animax	August 29, 2014
Turkey	Tenkai Knights	MinikaGO	September 1, 2014
