= Tenkai Knights: Brave Battle =

2014 video game

- North American box art
- Developer: Delta Arts
- Publisher: Bandai Namco Games
- Platform: Nintendo 3DS
- Release: NA: October 7, 2014; JP: September 25, 2014; EU: September 26, 2014; AU: September 25, 2014
- Genre: Fighting
- Modes: Single-player, multiplayer

Tenkai Knights: Brave Battle (テンカイナイト ブレイブバトル, Tenkai Naito Bureibu Batoru) is a fighting game developed by Delta Arts and published by Bandai Namco Games, based on the anime series Tenkai Knights. It was released for the Nintendo 3DS on September 25, 2014 in Japan and on October 7, 2014 in North America.

== Story ==
The game involves the group: Guren, Ceylan, Toxsa and Chooki. The group accidentally falls through an inter-dimensional portal. When they find themselves on the other side of the portal, the group appears in another world and have assumed the mantles of Bravenwolf, Tributon, Valorn and Lydendor — otherwise known as the legendary Tenkai Knights. They fight evil to protect both dimensions.

== Gameplay ==
In Tenkai Knights: Brave Battle, the player builds and customizes robots and then engages in combat with other robots. The game draws inspiration from the Tenkai Knights animated series.

== Reception ==
Reception

Review score
Publication	Score
Hardcore Gamer	1/5

Hardcore Gamer gave the game a 1/5, saying "The level of pure apathy on display must be seen to be believed, with practically everything boiling down to slight variations on the first level. Combat is frustrating, stages are painfully confining and difficulty ramps up too quickly. "
