= Kill la Kill =

Japanese anime television series and its franchise

- International promotional artwork, featuring Ryuko Matoi (foreground, wearing Senketsu) and Satsuki Kiryuin (background, wearing Junketsu)

キルラキル (Kiru Ra Kiru)
- Genre: Action; Comedy; Magical girl
- Created by: Trigger; Kazuki Nakashima
- Anime television series
- Directed by: Hiroyuki Imaishi
- Written by: Kazuki Nakashima
- Music by: Hiroyuki Sawano
- Studio: Trigger
- Licensed by: AUS: Crunchyroll Store Australia (Note: Formerly known as Madman Anime.); NA: Aniplex of America; UK: Anime Limited
- Original network: MBS, TBS, CBC TV
- English network: UK: Viceland; US: Adult Swim (Toonami)
- Original run: October 4, 2013 – March 28, 2014
- Episodes: 24 + OVA
- Manga
- Written by: Ryō Akizuki
- Published by: Kadokawa Shoten
- English publisher: NA: Udon Entertainment
- Magazine: Young Ace
- Original run: October 4, 2013 – February 4, 2015
- Volumes: 3
- icon

Kill la Kill (Japanese: キルラキル, Hepburn: Kiru Ra Kiru) (Note: pronounced [kʲiɾɯ̟ᵝ ɾa̠ kʲiɾɯ̟ᵝ]. The title puns on the English word kill (pronounced kiru in Japanese approximation) and the Japanese verbs kiru (切る, "cut, slice, carve"), and kiru (着る, "wear (on the upper part of the body)"); ra can be read as 裸 ("naked") or 羅 ("light clothing, silk").) is a Japanese anime television series created and produced by Trigger. The series follows vagrant schoolgirl Ryuko Matoi on her search for her father's killer, which brings her into violent conflict with Satsuki Kiryuin, the iron-willed student council president of Honnouji Academy, and her mother Ragyo Kiryuin's fashion empire. Ryuko, Satsuki, and others obtain martial arts superpowers from their clothes, which appear to have a will of their own.

The series is Trigger's first original anime television project, directed by Hiroyuki Imaishi and written by Kazuki Nakashima, both of whom had previously worked together on Gurren Lagann in 2007. Kill la Kill was broadcast in Japan on MBS' Animeism programming block between October 2013 and March 2014. An original video animation (OVA) was released as a 25th episode in September 2014. A manga adaptation by Ryō Akizuki began serialization in Kadokawa Shoten's Young Ace magazine from October 2013 to March 2015. A video game adaptation, titled Kill la Kill the Game: IF, was released in July 2019, with slight deviations to the main storyline of the anime.

In North America, Aniplex of America licensed the anime for a simulcast with a home video release starting in July 2014. The series premiered in the United States on Adult Swim's Toonami block in February 2015.

== Synopsis ==
=== Setting ===
Honnouji Academy (本能字学園, Honnōji Gakuen) is a fictional high school situated in Tokyo Bay, Japan, on the island of Honnō City. The school is dominated by its fearsome student council led by their president Satsuki Kiryuin. The students wear Goku Uniforms (極制服, Gokuseifuku) (Note: Gokuseifuku is a portmanteau of gokusei (極製, "finest quality") and seifuku (制服, "school uniform").) which give their wearers superhuman abilities because they are constructed with a special material known as Life Fibers (生命戦維, Seimei Sen'i; lit. 'Life Battle-Fibers'). Honnouji Academy and Honnō City feature a stratified class structure, in which higher-ranked students are allowed to obtain more powerful Goku Uniforms. This in turn affects the social status of the student's family.

=== Plot ===
Ryuko Matoi, a transfer student, arrives in Honnō City to find the murderer of her father Isshin Matoi. Her search leads her to Honnouji Academy, a militaristic high school ruled by Satsuki Kiryuin and the Elite Four student council, who use school uniforms called Goku Uniforms powered by a fabric called Life Fibers.

Following a failed attempt to challenge Satsuki on her first day, Ryuko stumbles across a sentient sailor uniform beneath the ruins of her father's home, which is a pure Life Fiber clothing called a Kamui (神衣; lit. 'Godrobe') that increases her abilities while transformed. She names the outfit "Senketsu", and becomes armed with a scissor-shaped longsword called a Scissor Blade that can cut Goku Uniforms. Satsuki responds by donning her family's Kamui Junketsu to challenge Ryuko's powers. Ryuko is joined by her hyperactive classmate Mako Mankanshoku, a no-star student who lets Ryuko move in with her impoverished family, and her homeroom teacher Aikuro Mikisugi, who is actually an undercover agent of the anti-Life Fiber paramilitary organization Nudist Beach (ヌーディスト・ビーチ, Nūdisuto Bīchi).

After battling numerous council members, including the Elite Four, Ryuko meets Nui Harime, a member of the global REVOCS Corporation (REVOCSコーポレーション, Ribokkusu Kōporēshon) run by the academy's director and Satsuki's mother, Ragyo Kiryuin. Harime reveals herself as Isshin's killer, who stole the other Scissor Blade.

Satsuki leads her school to the upcoming Tri-City Schools Raid, a blitzkrieg raid to annex the remaining independent schools in Kansai, with the secret goal of destroying Nudist Beach's base in Osaka. After the raid, Ryuko learns that her father founded Nudist Beach and created Senketsu to fight the Life Fibers, which are actually parasitic aliens that prompted humanity's evolution to later feed on them.

Ryuko and Nudist Beach storm the Honnouji Academy festival held in Ragyo's honor before she awakens the Life Fibers. Satsuki betrays her mother, revealing her true goal to destroy the Life Fibers and avenge her father and younger sister, whom Ragyo ordered killed when Satsuki was young. Satsuki's plan backfires when Ragyo, revealed to be a human/Life Fiber hybrid, captures her while ordering the Life Fibers to consume every human. Ryuko discovers that she is Satsuki's presumed-dead younger sister and Ragyo's daughter; Ragyo's ex-husband, Sōichirō Kiryuin, faked his death and saved the infant Ryuko before taking the identity of Isshin as a disguise.

As Ragyo and the Life Fibers devastate Japan, the Elite Four and Nudist Beach rescue both Satsuki and Mako. Ryuko is brainwashed and bonded to Junketsu to pursue them, but Satsuki, Mako, and Senketsu manage to free Ryuko, who then regains the other Scissor Blade from Harime. Ryuko and Satsuki proceed to intercept Ragyo before she and the Primordial Life Fiber, the source of all Life Fibers, can reach Honnouji Academy to launch a command signal to a satellite for all Life Fibers to cover the planet and destroy it. However, Harime completes Shinra-Kōketsu, the ultimate Kamui, with Ragyo's secretary Rei Hououmaru offered as a sacrifice to activate it.

The heroes destroy the transmitter and extract Rei from Shinra-Kōketsu, only for Ragyo to restore its power by absorbing Harime and the Primordial Life Fiber. Ryuko pursues her mother into space after everyone offers their Goku Uniforms to power up Senketsu. She manages to have Senketsu absorb Shinra-Kōketsu to rescind the order. Defeated, Ragyo spitefully commits suicide while promising that the Life Fibers will one day attack Earth again. Despite being victorious, Senketsu begins breaking down from absorbing Shinra-Kōketsu and sacrifices himself to ensure Ryuko safely returns to Earth.

In the follow-up OVA episode, set two weeks after the battle with Ragyo, Rei Hououmaru uses leftover Life Fibers to create doppelgängers of Satsuki and the Elite Four in Junketsu and their original Goku Uniforms to disrupt Honnouji Academy's graduation ceremony and avenge Ragyo. The clones are defeated while Satsuki convinces Rei to abandon her struggle as Ryuko uses the Scissor Blades to finish off Honnouji Academy. Honnō City and the school sink into Tokyo Bay, as well as Ryuko's Scissor Blades. With their mission over, everyone can finally live a normal life free of the Life Fibers.

== Development ==
The anime television project, directed by Hiroyuki Imaishi at his animation studio, Trigger, was first teased in the March 2013 issue of Kadokawa Shoten's Newtype magazine released on February 7, 2013. Kill la Kill was officially announced on May 8, 2013, with scripts written by Kazuki Nakashima and character designs by Sushio.

According to director Imaishi, much of the plot is based on his observation that the Japanese manner of pronouncing "fascism" (ファッショ, fassho) is nearly the same as the word "fashion" (ファッション, fasshon), his observation that the pronunciation of the Japanese words "school uniform" (制服, seifuku) and "conquest" (征服, seifuku) are identical, and that the titular kiru may mean "kill" (キル), "to cut" (切る), or "to wear" (着る).

== Release ==
=== Broadcast ===
Kill la Kill aired in Japan on MBS' Animeism programming block between October 4, 2013, and March 28, 2014. It also aired on TBS, CBC and BS-TBS.

Aniplex of America licensed the series, and it was simulcast on Crunchyroll, Hulu, and Daisuki. The series aired on Adult Swim's Toonami block in the United States from February 8 to August 2, 2015. (Note: Adult Swim used an after midnight schedule for Toonami, so the show's programming guide lists the dates for its shows on the Saturday night, February 7, 2015, which is technically the same as Sunday morning, February 8, 2015. The English airdates shown in this list reflect the actual date.) and premiered on Viceland UK on October 16, 2017.

In Italy, the streaming rights of the series were acquired by Dynit, which announced the acquisition, with reservation, at its conference at Lucca Comics 2017. The acquisition became successful on December 22 of the same year and Dynit published the series on VVVVID on February 6, 2018. Subsequently, the Italian dub of the series was added to Netflix on September 1, 2018.

=== Home media ===
==== Japanese ====
The video release on Blu-ray Disc and DVD began on January 8, 2014. Soundtrack CDs are included with the first and fifth volumes, making-of documentary DVDs are included with the third, seventh, and ninth volumes, and drama CDs are included with the second, fourth, sixth, and eighth volumes. An original video animation episode was released as part of the ninth volume on September 3, 2014.

Aniplex (Region A/2)
Volume	Episodes	Release date
Volume 1	1–2	January 8, 2014
Volume 2	3–5	February 5, 2014
Volume 3	6–8	March 5, 2014
Volume 4	9–11	April 2, 2014
Volume 5	12–14	May 7, 2014
Volume 6	15–17	June 4, 2014
Volume 7	18–20	July 2, 2014
Volume 8	21–23	August 6, 2014
Volume 9	24 + OVA (25)	September 3, 2014

==== English ====
The series was released in five BD/DVD volumes in North America. The first volume was released on July 15, 2014, in limited edition BD/DVD combo packs including soundtrack CDs, as well as standard Blu-ray Disc and DVD releases. At Anime Expo 2014 held in Los Angeles, Aniplex premiered the first English dub episode, and hosted a performance by theme song singer Eir Aoi, and a panel with script writer Kazuki Nakashima, director Sushio, producer Yosuke Toba, and voice actresses Ami Koshimizu and Ryoka Yuzuki.

Aniplex of America (Region A/1)
Volume	Episodes	Release date
Volume 1	1–4	July 15, 2014
Volume 2	5–9	October 21, 2014
Volume 3	10–14	December 23, 2014
Volume 4	15–19	February 24, 2015
Volume 5	20–24 + OVA (25)	April 28, 2015

The series is licensed in the United Kingdom and France by Anime Limited, and was simulcast on Wakanim, later receiving a digital release on Netflix. The series was released on Blu-ray and DVD in three Collector's Edition sets. The first set was originally slated for a release date on December 8, 2014, but was later moved to November 17, 2014. Subsequently, the release was pushed forward a further two weeks, with the first release being available in the UK on November 3, 2014, while the Blu-ray version was pushed back to December 1 of that same year.

Anime Limited (Region B/2)
Volume	Episodes	Release date
Volume 1	1–9	November 3, 2014 (DVD); December 1, 2014 (Blu-ray)
Volume 2	10–19	March 23, 2015
Volume 3	20-24 + OVA (25)	July 11, 2016

In Australia and New Zealand, the series is licensed by Madman Entertainment, who simulcasted the series on Madman Screening Room, and later released the series digitally on AnimeLab. The series was released on Blu-ray and DVD, and mirrored the release pattern of the North American releases. The first volume was released on October 15, 2014.

Madman Entertainment (Region B/4)
Volume	Episodes	Release date	Ref.
Volume 1	1–4	October 15, 2014	
Volume 2	5–9	December 10, 2014	
Volume 3	10–14	March 11, 2014	
Volume 4	15–19	April 15, 2015	
Volume 5	20–24 + OVA (25)	June 10, 2015	

== Soundtrack ==
Kill la Kill Original Sound Track

Soundtrack album by Hiroyuki Sawano
- Released: December 25, 2013
- Studios: Bunkamura Studio; ONKIO HAUS; Studio GreenBird; LAB recorders
- Genre: Soundtrack
- Length: 1:17:22
- Languages: English; German
- Label: Aniplex
- Producer: Hiroyuki Sawano

Music for the series was composed by Hiroyuki Sawano. For the first fifteen episodes, the opening theme is "Sirius" (シリウス, Shiriusu) by Eir Aoi, while the ending theme is Gomen ne, Iiko ja Irarenai (ごめんね、いいコじゃいられない。; "Sorry, I'm Done Being a Good Kid") by Miku Sawai.

From episode 16 onwards, the opening theme is "ambiguous" by Garnidelia, a duo consisting of vocalist Maria and composer Toku, and the ending theme is "Shin Sekai Kōkyōgaku" (新世界交響楽; "New World Symphony") by Sayonara Ponytail, though an extended version of the original ending theme returns for the last portion of episode 24. Aoi's song "Sanbika" was used as an image song to accompany climactic events in episodes 3, 7, 11 and 23.

The first soundtrack album was published on December 25, 2013. Aniplex USA also released the CD on January 17, 2014. It features 18 tracks, including six vocal songs performed in English and German. The background music tracks feature titles that are typographical variants of "Kill la Kill".

The second soundtrack album was released in Japan as part of the fifth DVD/Blu-ray disc set on May 7, 2014. It also features "Kara-OK" (空OK, karaoke) versions of the vocal tracks from the first album, among other background music.

=== Track listing ===
All music is composed by Hiroyuki Sawano.

Kill la Kill Original Soundtrack
No.	Title	Lyrics	Performer(s)	Length
1.	"Before my body is dry"	mpi; David Whitaker	Mika Kobayashi; David Whitaker	4:07
2.	"goriLLA-Ja-L" (goriLLA蛇L Gori Ra Jaru)			4:16
3.	"InuKA3L" (犬Kあ3L Inu Ka Saru)			4:34
4.	"Blumenkranz"	Rie	Cyua	4:19
5.	"Ad la Lib" (AdラLib Ado Ra Ribu)			3:24
6.	"Kiryu ga KiLL" (鬼龍G@キLL Kiryū ga Kiru)			4:38
7.	"KILL 7la Kill" (KILL7la切ル Kiru Nara Kiru)			4:46
8.	"Suck your blood"	mpi	mpi; Benjamin Anderson	3:40
9.	"Kik9=KELL" (Kiっ9=KELL Kikku wa Keru)			4:51
10.	"k1ll wa iLL" (k1ll◎iLL Kiru Wa Iru)			3:08
11.	"Light your heart up"	cAnON.	Aimee Blackschleger	3:56
12.	"Hiru ra lilL♪" (昼裸lilL♪ Hiru Ra Riru)			2:02
13.	"KiLL La KiLL" (斬LLLア生LL Kiru Ra Kiru)			4:25
14.	"Kiryu ha KiLL" (キ龍ha着LL Kiryū Ha Kiru)			4:15
15.	"I want to know"	mpi; Benjamin Anderson	Benjamin Anderson	4:07
16.	"NeLL na Ki9" (寝LLna聴9 Neru Na Kiku)			7:08
17.	"Kill a KiLL" (Kiる厭KiLL Kiru A Kiru)			5:06
18.	"Till I Die"	cAnON.	CASG (Caramel Apple Sound Gadget)	4:41
Total length:				1:17:22

Kill la Kill Original Soundtrack Vol. 2
No.	Title	Length
1.	"Gekiban Tokka-gata Hitotsuboshi Gokuseifuku" (劇伴特化型1☆極★服)	3:24
2.	"Rhythm Kyōka-gata Futatsuboshi Gokuseifuku" (リズム強化型2☆極★服)	4:12
3.	"Nichijō Gekijō-gata Mittsuboshi Gokuseifuku" (日常劇場型3☆極★服)	3:35
4.	"Fuku o Kita Buta-gata Yottsuboshi Gokuseifuku" (服着豚型4☆極★服)	4:13
5.	"Naming Sense 0-gata Itsutsuboshi Gokuseifuku" (名付扇子0型5☆極★服)	5:10
6.	"Tsuika Hatchū-gata Muttsuboshi Gokuseifuku" (追加発注型6☆極★服)	4:14
7.	"Haikei Keigu-gata Nanatsuboshi Gokuseifuku" (背景敬具型7☆極★服)	4:21
8.	"MT Hensō-gata Yattsuboshi Gokuseifuku" (MT変装型8☆極★服)	4:51
9.	"Tabun LASTBOSS-gata Kokonotsuboshi Gokuseifuku" (多分裸SBOSS-型9☆極★服)	3:30
10.	"Zenhan Saishūroku-gata Tōnohoshi Gokuseifuku" (前半再収録型10☆極★服)	4:45
11.	"Tsuika Saishūroku-gata Tōtohitotsuboshi Gokuseifuku" (追加再収録型11☆極★服)	2:54
12.	"Jūyoubutsu Hakkō Kyōchō-gata Tōtofutatsuboshi Gokuseifuku" (重要物発行強調型12☆極★服)	4:09
13.	"Before my body is dry <Kara-OK>" (Before my body is dry <空OK>)	4:06
14.	"Suck your blood <Kara-OK>" (Suck your blood <空OK>)	3:41
15.	"Blumenkranz <Kara-OK>" (Blumenkranz <空OK>)	4:18
16.	"Light your heart up <Kara-OK>" (Light your heart up <空OK>)	3:55
17.	"I want to know <Kara-OK>" (I want to know <空OK>)	4:06
18.	"Till I Die <Kara-OK>" (Till I Die <空OK>)	4:41
Total length:		1:14:05

== Other media ==
=== Manga ===
A manga adaptation by Ryō Akizuki started in Kadokawa Shoten's seinen manga magazine Young Ace on October 4, 2013, and concluded with 17 chapters on February 4, 2015. Its chapters were collected in three tankōbon volumes, released from December 4, 2013, to March 4, 2015.

In North America, the manga was licensed for English release by Udon Entertainment.

No.	Original release date	Original ISBN	English release date	English ISBN
1	December 4, 2013	978-4-04-120908-0	October 15, 2015	978-1-9279254-92
2	March 10, 2014	978-4-04-121048-2	April 20, 2016	978-1-927925-54-6
3	March 4, 2015	978-4-04-102107-1	September 20, 2016	978-1-927925-84-3

=== Video game ===
A video game adaptation titled Kill la Kill the Game: IF (キルラキル ザ・ゲーム -異布-, Kiru ra Kiru za Gēmu: Ifu) (Note: IF (異布, ifu) roughly translates to "Irregular Fashion".) was announced at the Anime Expo between July 5–8, 2018. The game was published by Arc System Works and developed by A+ Games, who developed Little Witch Academia: Chamber of Time, also based on another anime by Trigger. It was released on PlayStation 4, Nintendo Switch, and PC in Japan on July 25, 2019, and in North America and Europe the next day. In Europe, the game was published by PQube. Kill la Kill the Game: IF also received an English dub. The game's storyline takes place during the events of episode 3, depicting Satsuki being placed by Junketsu in artificial reality that follows the anime storyline with slight deviations.

== Reception ==
Kill la Kill was met with mostly positive reviews. Eliot Gay of Japanator called the "uniquely fun, even gripping" series "a reminder of how fun and creative anime can be at its best." Kat Bailey of IGN, describing the series as "magical girl anime on speed", noted that its over-the-top absurdity was part of its charm. Joseph Luster of Otaku USA described the series's concept as "mostly straightforward setup for revenge and shonen-style 'stronger! STRONGER!' battle progression", but praised its execution. Richard Eisenbeis of Kotaku appreciated the series for "perfectly mixing comedy and action", its pacing, internal consistency and over-the-top straightforward adaptation of standard action anime tropes.

The animation of fight scenes and character movements, as well as the "keen selection of music", were particularly praised by Robert Frazer of UK Anime Network, The site selected it as the 2013 UK Anime Network Awards winner in the "Best streaming anime" category. Carl Kimlinger of Anime News Network also appreciated the inventive and funny animation and the series's "retro shonen action pushed to ... loony, hyperactive extremes". Michael Logarta of GMA News Online likewise noted the "superb pacing", to-the-point storytelling and well-realized characters in the series's "whirlwind of gorgeous visuals, story, and unfettered insanity".

Kill la Kill won multiple prizes during the 4th Newtype Anime Awards, including Best Character Design (Sushio), Best Script (Kazuki Nakashima), Best Sound, and Best Picture (TV Broadcast). It placed second for Best Theme Song ("Sirius"), Best Director (Hiroyuki Imaishi) and Best Studio (Trigger). In the Best Mascot category, Senketsu placed third and Guts placed ninth. In Best Character (female), Ryuko placed second, and Mako placed third. The anime was part of the Jury Selections of the 18th Japan Media Arts Festival in the Animation category.

The Encyclopedia of Science Fiction described Kill la Kill as an entertaining and deliberately absurd anime despite its narrative and visual shortcomings. It highlighted the influence of Barrington J. Bayley's novel The Garments of Caean (1976) and the series' opposition to fascism and totalitarianism, noting parallels with George Orwell's Nineteen Eighty-Four. However, it argued that the political message was weakened by the eventual sympathetic portrayal of Satsuki and her authoritarian academy. The encyclopedia particularly criticized the excessive fan service, arguing that the sexualized transformation sequences undermined the portrayal of otherwise strong female characters. Despite this criticism, some plot holes and apparent budget constraints reflected in the extensive use of still images, it considered the series enjoyable for its self-aware humor and exaggerated action.

In 2025, in reference to Texas Senate Bill 20, Nick Valdez of ComicBook said that the legislation could lead to censorship of the anime (and manga) within Texas, with Kill la Kill being one of the anime mentioned that could be affected.
