= List of Witch Hunter Robin characters =

The protagonists of the series. Clockwise from top, Amon, Robin Sena, Haruto Sakaki, Michael Lee, Yurika Dōjima and Miho Karasuma.

The anime series Witch Hunter Robin featured an extensive cast of fictional characters designed by Kumiko Takahashi. The series takes place on a fictional modern-day Earth where the Solomon organization fights the harmful use of witchcraft using a database of witches, those who have obtained the power of witchcraft through genetics, and those who carry the gene called "seeds" in order to arrest them or to employ Hunters, people who hunt witches, should their powers "awaken".

The series' titular character is Robin Sena, a soft-spoken 15-year-old Hunter and witch with pyrokinetic abilities. She is sent to Solomon's Japanese branch, the STN-J. There she meets five other Hunters: Amon, Haruto Sakaki, Michael Lee, Miho Karasuma and Yurika Dōjima. The antagonists include Takuma Zaizen, administrator of the STN-J. As the series progresses, Robin's witch power strengthens and she is hunted by the Solomon organization.

== Main characters ==
=== Robin Sena ===
Robin Sena (瀬名 ロビン, Sena Robin) is a soft-spoken 15-year-old Hunter and craft-user with pyrokinetic abilities. She was raised in a convent in Italy-(where she was taught how to use and control her craft in hunting down Witches) before she was sent to the STN-J to gather information for the Solomon administration; even though she was born in Japan, she had moved to Tuscany when she was still very young. Her witch powers allow her to channel her energy into shields capable of blocking solid matter and crafts, magical powers. However, any use of her power temporarily weakens her eyesight, greatly reducing her accuracy and effectiveness. This problem is solved when she begins to wear glasses. Although she is good-natured, Robin employs her gift with lethal force when necessary to save a life or for the good of others. As the series progresses, her powers increase rapidly until she is labeled dangerous by Solomon and is ordered to be hunted as a witch. It is discovered that Robin is a "Designer Witch" and was created through "Project Robin", a genetic engineering project. Her mother, Maria, had agreed to genetic manipulation and called the unborn Robin "Hope." Robin was designed to give birth to witch kind, what was once called "divinities" in ancient history. Robin was given thousands of years witch kind's memories, the origin of "craft". This enables her to understand the sadness arising from the conflict between humans and witches, in turn allowing her to find a way for humans and witches to peacefully coexist. Amon volunteers to be a watchman who will terminate her if she becomes destructive. She accepts this. After the collapse of the Factory, her fate is unknown. The reactions of the other characters show that she is believed to be alive, but is said to be dead for her own safety. However, after the ending credits it shows that a new hunter arrived at the STN-J, which is actually not a new hunter but Robin herself. She is voiced by Akeno Watanabe in Japanese and Kari Wahlgren in English.

=== Amon ===
Amon (亜門, Amon) is a cold and serious 25-year-old S-class Hunter. He is asked by Zaizen to watch over Robin and he reluctantly does so. After seeing her worth in dealing with highly prominent witches, he accepts her. After an attack on the STN-J headquarters, he is no longer seen working under Zaizen and instead works for the Solomon headquarters. When he is ordered to kill Robin, Amon finds he cannot. Amon's father was a seed and his mother was a witch, indicating he carries the dormant witch trait. He fears the awakening of the gene. His fear and hatred of witches stems from the awakening of his mother as a witch, who no longer recognized him afterward. When Robin accepts her role as the one who will find a way for humans and witches to peacefully coexist, Amon volunteers to be a watchman who will terminate her if she becomes destructive. After the collapse of the Factory, his ultimate fate is unknown. However, the reactions of the other characters show that he is believed to be alive, but is said to be dead for his own safety; it's been strongly implied that Amon harbors romantic feelings for Robin. He is voiced by Takuma Takewaka in Japanese and Crispin Freeman in English.

=== Haruto Sakaki ===
Haruto Sakaki (榊 晴人, Sakaki Haruto) is an 18-year-old Hunter. Haruto is supportive, but brash, slightly hot-tempered, and ambitious, often rushing into danger during hunts, producing regrettable results. He is the STN-J's newest member, after Robin, and is initially afraid of being replaced when she arrives. Despite this, he welcomes her. Although his exact condition is unknown, it is suggested he is an unawakened seed when he is hunted by Zaizen. At the series' conclusion, Sakaki is confirmed to be alive and still hunting witches. He is voiced by Jun Fukuyama in Japanese and Johnny Yong Bosch in English.

=== Michael Lee ===
Michael Lee (マイケル・リー, Maikeru Rī) is the STN-J's hacker and technical support expert, he's also the only member who doesn't go on hunts. When Zaizen caught him hacking into the STN-J computer network, Michael is given the option of working for the STN-J or being killed. Michael opted for the former and is confined to the STN-J headquarters building at all times, unable to leave the building's headquarters without the boss' permission. He is a skilled hacker and is able to locate extensive information, including witch profiles, police reports, without leaving a trace. Other characters do not maintain a relationship with him, save for a business-like relationship, and do not often interact with him. Michael, in turn, does not interact with them and avoids Robin. However, he begins to develop a relationship when she stays in the office at night to accompany him. At the series' conclusion, he is finally given permission to leave STN-J headquarters. He is voiced by Hiro Yūki in Japanese and Dave Wittenberg in English.

=== Miho Karasuma ===
Miho Karasuma (烏丸 美穂, Karasuma Miho) is a 19-year-old hunter and craft-user. Her craft, psychometry, allows her to touch an object and read the strong emotions and thoughts a person had while holding it. Sometimes, she is able to see past events that happened to or around an item or place. Because of this, she is able to relay useful information while investigating a crime scene or examining evidence. She gives Robin advice on how to improve her control over her power and acts like a mentor. Despite her young age, Karasuma acts like a professional and is determined to get things done. At the series' conclusion, she replaces Amon as team leader and works hard to hunt down witches. She is voiced by Kaho Kōda in Japanese and Wendee Lee in English.

=== Yurika Dojima ===
Yurika Dojima (堂島 百合香, Dōjima Yurika) is portrayed as carefree, lazy, vain and immature; she would sooner go shopping than go on a mission. She is consistently late for work and rarely does anything around the office. When she does do work, she does as little as possible and leaves as soon as she is finished. She tells Robin that her parents have authority over the STN-J and had the STN-J act as her "caretakers". Dōjima does not warm up to Robin at first, mockingly calling her "Amon's Girl", but towards the end of the series she begins to take a liking for Robin, calling her "Little Robin". As the series progresses, she begins take more responsibility for her work and proves she has more insight and perception of her surroundings than originally presumed. She is revealed to be a Solomon intelligence operative, sent to the STN-J to uncover information about the Orbo. At the series' conclusion, she begins to take the task of hunting witches seriously. She is voiced by Kyōko Hikami in Japanese and Michelle Ruff in English.

== Antagonists ==
=== Takuma Zaizen ===
Takuma Zaizen (財前 琢磨, Zaizen Takuma) is the administrator of the STN-J and the Factory and Tōko's father. He sends captured witches to the Factory to transform their blood into the Orbo, a substance the STN-J Hunters use to stop witches; halfway towards the end of the series, he is revealed to be the hidden main antagonist. Zaizen is incinerated by Robin while he is escaping from an unsuccessful attempt on her life. He is voiced by Michihiro Ikemizu in Japanese and Jamieson Price in English.

== Other characters ==
=== Shintaro Kosaka ===
Chief Inspector Shintaro Kosaka (小坂 慎太郎, Kosaka Shintarō) is a short-tempered man working directly under Zaizen. He updates Zaizen on the organization's progress as well as other related information. He is usually seen criticizing the employees while they are investigating a case or not doing work when he thinks they should. He constantly yells and scolds them, and he mostly fusses over his secretary Shohei Hattori (服部 庄平, Hattori Shohei) and Dōjima. Although he may be an annoyance to the rest of the Hunters, he shows some concern for them. Originally a member of the city police force, he possesses connections the hunters use when the STN-J are unavailable. At the series' conclusion, he is the STN-J's new administrator. He is voiced by Shinpachi Tsuji in Japanese and Doug Stone in English.

=== Shohei Hattori ===
Shohei Hattori (服部 庄平, Hattori Shohei) is the secretary to Shintarō Kosaka. He is voiced by Masaaki Ōkura in Japanese and Dave Mallow in English.

=== Master ===
Yuji Kobari (小針裕, Kobari Yūji), commonly called Master (マスター, Masutā) is the calm and polite proprietor of "Harry's", a cafe frequented by Robin and the rest of the series' main cast. His son, Yukata, is a witch and it is hinted that Master has "awakened" as well. He usually provides the Hunters with information that he manages to pick up from his customers. He takes a special interest in Robin, looking out for her and preparing food for her when she cannot come to the bar. Near the series' conclusion, he empathizes with her troubles and welcomes her "home." He is voiced by Hirotaka Nagai in Japanese and Jerry Gelb in English.

=== Toko Masaki ===
Toko Masaki ((真崎 瞳子, Masaki Tōko) is Robin's roommate, and also Zaizen's daughter. She takes care of Robin until the raid at STN-J, and expresses interest in Robin by asking her several questions. She appears to have had a relationship with Amon, but he eventually decides to end the relationship. In the middle of the series, a group of assassins tie her up, duct tape her mouth shut, and use her as bait during an assassination attempt on Robin in her apartment. During the ensuing gun battle, she is shot in the back and critically injured. After the gun battle, Zaizen kicks Amon repeatedly, saying "your failure lead to this", suggesting Zaizen is the one who planned the attack, using his own daughter as bait. Others tell Robin that Toko's "physically recovered but the rest is mental", suggesting that Toko is having difficulty accepting what happened; after her physical recovery, she's currently staying at a sanatorium. When her father visits her at the hospital, she tells him to leave Amon alone. Because her parents are divorced, she and her father have different last names-(implying that she took her mother's last name upon their divorce). She is voiced by Mami Nakajima in Japanese and Mela Lee in English.

=== Shunji Nagira ===
Shunji Nagira (凪羅 俊司, Nagira Shunji) is an attorney and is Amon's older half-brother by the same father. He takes Robin in after she leaves STN-J, and he runs a private office with two assistants. He has Robin act as a bike messenger, partly because he does not believe the government is correct in persecuting witches. Throughout whole episodes, Nagira does not do anything but investigate. He gathers information in the streets by means of a man he meets in a pachinko bar as well as a witch in Wall City. Personality-wise, he appears to be the opposite of his brother, as he is talkative, goofy, occasionally lazy, and tends to do things his way. He is voiced by Jin Yamanoi in Japanese and Lex Lang in English.

=== Grand Inquisitor Cortion ===
Grand Inquisitor Cortion is an Inquisitor sent from Solomon to perform an inquisition on the craft-user Shiro Masudo in the episode "The Eyes of Truth." Karasuma explains to Sakaki that Solomon uses a human Inquisitor to make the final decision whether a craft-user/witch can be a hunter or not. Amon and Robin escort Cortion to the church he will be staying, and a discussion between the Inquisitor and Robin reveals that he performed Robin's Inquisition. As Cortion is leaving to return to HQ after the Inquisition, he tells Robin they will probably never meet again and alludes to the fact that she has awakened to "the pleasure of using her craft." He is voiced by Hiroshi Naka in Japanese and Michael Forest in English.

=== Father Juliano Colegui ===
Father Juliano Colegui is a Roman Catholic priest and Robin's former guardian, he is also her maternal grandfather who raised her from birth. In the beginning of the series, Robin mentions that his powers have diminished, suggesting that he was once a craft user for Solomon, although it is never stated what his specific craft was. Since he and Robin are related, its probable that he was a fire craft user like Robin. He visits Robin in the latter part of the series to inform her about the events surrounding her past. During the times Robin stays with Nagira, he is the one who asks Amon to hunt Robin, for fear that she wouldn't be able to control her powers as they grew stronger. Later, in "Redemption Day" he confronts Robin himself, and sees that she has not changed, nor turned into the monster he feared her to be. He asks her forgiveness and blesses her, giving her the information taken from Todo's journal that will help her choose her path, and entrusts her to her own destiny, knowing she will choose the right actions. He is voiced by Masane Tsukayama in Japanese and Tom Wyner in English.

=== Hiroshi Todo ===
Hiroshi Todo is Robin's father and the brilliant scientist, who designed her genes and artificially inseminated her within Maria. He researched a new project to repair the conflicts between humans and witches, but the evidence of his research was destroyed by Solomon, because of the potential danger it contained, although it was far too late as the project had already reached its final stages. He entrusted Juliano with Robin's care, after Maria's death, gambling that Juliano would let her live. In the final episode, a recording of him is displayed on a computer in The Factory, explaining everything about his project, Robin's origins and potential, and the origins of Solomon's fear of witches (much to Zaizan's dismay). He is voiced by Naoya Uchida in Japanese and Tony Oliver in English.

=== Maria Colegui ===
Maria Colegui is the daughter of Father Juliano and Robin's mother, although not by a standard means of birth. She passed her power of pyrokinesis to Robin, stating that she is the "Hope" for the future of the well-being of all witches, as well as the key to solving the struggle of acceptance between witches and humans. Maria died after giving birth to Robin.
