= List of Getter Robo characters =

The following is a list of characters from the anime and manga series Getter Robo.

== Getter Robo ==
=== Getter Team ===
- Ryoma Nagare (流竜馬, Nagare Ryōma) Voiced by: Akira Kamiya - is the protagonist and main pilot in the Getter Robo franchise. He is a hot-blooded youth in high school. He pilots the Getter-1, Getter Dragon, and Shin Getter-1 in the manga and anime. He is voiced by Akira Kamiya in the original Getter Robo anime television series, as well as its sequel Getter Robo G, while in Getter Robo Armageddon, Shin Getter Robo vs Neo Getter Robo, and New Getter Robo, he is voiced by Hideo Ishikawa. Ryoma is heavily featured in the Super Robot Wars games, mostly in his anime series incarnation. He also appears in Another Century Episode 3 game for the PS2 in his Getter Robo Armageddon version.

In the manga, Ryoma (called "Ryou" for short in the Manga and anime television series) is an aggressive and short-tempered martial artist who crashes a martial arts tournament, then challenges and quickly knocks out most of the students with his more brutal martial arts style. His abilities and durability catch the attention of Professor Saotome, who is looking for suitable pilot candidates for the Getter Machines. To further test Ryoma's abilities, Saotome hires three highly skilled assassins to hunt down and try to kill Ryoma. Ryoma manages to defeat them while trying to resist the effects of a highly potent tranquilizer shot into him by one of Satome's assistants, before finally being rendered unconscious by a combination of fatigue, the tranquilizer, and Saotome humorously tapping Ryoma on his head with one of his wooden sandals. Ryoma wakes up at the Saotome Research Lab, where he is told that the fight before was a test to determine whether or not he had the exceptional capabilities required to handle the Getter Robo, and is given the offer to be one of its pilots. He is made the pilot of Getter Eagle/Getter 1
In the anime television series, Ryoma is much less aggressive than his manga counterpart. He goes to high school with Musashi, Hayato, and Michiru. He travels to the Satome Research Institute on the day the Prototype Getter Robo is being tested. He witnesses the death of the Prototype Getter Robo team including the son of Professor Saotome at the hands of the Evil Dinosaur Empire. He enlists the aid of Musashi Tomoe and Hayato Jin in order to pilot the real Getter Robo. Ryoma piloting the Getter-1 is key to battling the Dinosaur Empire. Ryoma and his friends fight the Dinosaur Empire until the final battle in which Musahi gives his life to defeat them.
Even after the defeat of the Dinosaur Empire, a new threat arises in the form of the Clan of the 100 Demons. The remaining members of the Getter Robo team get Benkei Kuruma to pilot the last jet of the Getter Robo G. Ryoma pilots the Getter Dragon in the second series.
In the 1998 OVA series Getter Robo Armageddon, Ryoma was framed for the murder of Dr. Saotome. After a resurrected Dr. Saotome threatens to destroy the world, he is released from jail to commit the very murder he was accused of. Ryoma holds a grudge with Hayato; who not only committed the murder of Saotome, he also testified against him. After failing to stop a nuclear attack on Shin Dragon, he vanishes from Earth. He reappears 13 years later in an abandoned base located on the Moon. He rejoins the fight against The Invaders piloting a customized Getter, the Black Getter.
Ryoma appears as a supporting character in Shin Getter Robo vs Neo Getter Robo. Mentally scarred after being tortured by the Dinosaur Empire and the death of Musashi, he quits the Getter Team and wanders Japan as a martial artist. He returns and helps the New Getter Team when the Dinosaurs Empire attempts to destroy Shin Getter Robo.

- Hayato Jin (神隼人, Jin Hayato) Voiced by: Keaton Yamada - The aloof and seemingly anti-social Hayato Jin, displays considerable skill at various sports, but generally likes to be left alone. Despite this he eventually gets all the girls, including the Kyoryu Empire android spies. Hayato pilots the Jaguar Machine into battle with Ryoma Nagare and Musashi Tomoe. When combined with the others he pilots Getter 2. The machine reflects Hayato's physical strength and speed. He is voiced by Keaton Yamada, who eventually became the voice of Combattler V's Juzo Naniwa. In Getter Robo Armageddon, Shin Getter Robo vs Neo Getter Robo, and New Getter Robo, he is voiced by Naoya Uchida. Getter Robo G was called Starvengers in the US and Hayato Jin was changed to Paladin Spencer.
- Musashi Tomoe (巴武蔵, Tomoe Musashi) Voiced by: Toku Nishio - A Judo expert, pilots the third robot. In the manga, he takes over the role of piloting the third jet and robot, despite failing at all the given physical and mental tests. He is known for dying in almost every series he is in.
- Benkei Kuruma (車弁慶, Kuruma Benkei) Voiced by: Jouji Yanami - A baseball player, pilot of the third robot in the second series. In Getter Robo Armageddon, he is the adoptive father of the amnesiac Genki Saotome.
- Professor Saotome (早乙女博士, Saotome-hakase) Voiced by: Kousei Tomita - Inventor of the Getter Robo. In the original manga, he initially piloted the third jet himself, only to have Musashi forcibly take over the role from him.
- Michiru Saotome (早乙女ミチル, Saotome Michiru) Voiced by: Rihoko Yoshida - Professor Saotome's beautiful and strong-willed daughter, pilots a jet of her own which doesn't combine with the others, but resupplies fuel and energy. All four of the Getter Robo/G pilots have shown an attraction towards her at some point, though her feelings do not appear to be mutual, and rarely anything ever comes of their advances towards her. Despite this, she remains on a friendly basis with all of them. She is killed before the events of Getter Robo Armageddon, and her death is a key plot point in the series. In the New Getter Robo OVA, she appears to be older and has a much shorter temper than any of her previous incarnations.
- Genki Saotome (早乙女元気, Saotome Genki) Voiced by: Hiroko Kikuchi - Professor Saotome's son, the child tagalong present in nearly all 1970's Japanese action cinema.

In the Getter Robo Armageddon OVA, Genki is a girl, and Professor Saotome deliberately raised her as a boy to mislead the public about her true gender for her own protection. She is left mentally scarred after seeing the true cause of Michiru's demise, and then stumbling on to the scene of her father's "murder" some time later. After witnessing "Armageddon", which her father put into motion, the excessive mental trauma causes her to go amnesiac. To protect her from the vengeance of the other survivors, Benkei uses his knowledge of her true gender and her newly amnesiac mind to convince them that she is his own daughter, giving her the name Kei Kuruma. Thirteen years later, Kei grows up into a tomboyish and somewhat short-tempered woman, and she becomes one of the members of the new Getter Team, piloting the Shin Jaguar/Shin Getter 2.

- Monji Ogarashi(大枯文次 Monji Ōgarashi?): Eccentric inventor, created a red robot, named Asataro, who works as his assistant. Lives in a hut near Saotome Institute (Getter Ray Research Institute); corpulent and strong. He initially dislikes the Getter Team, especially Musashi because they both have a crush on Michiru.
- Joho (ジョーホー Jōhō?): Attends same school as the Getter Team, and he is also a member of Musashi's judo team. Small in stature and sports a shaven head. He is also a friend and disciple of Monji.
- Asataro (浅太郎 Asatarō?): Goofy robot created by Monji . Asataro is Monji's assistant.
- Kazuko Saotome (早乙女 和子 Saotome Kazuko?): Dr. Saotome's wife.
- Asuka Jin (神明日香 Jin Asuka?): Hayato's sister.
- Ichiwa Nagare (流 一岩 Nagare Ichiwa?): Father of Ryoma, supreme Martial artist, and an infamous dojo killer who Ryoma greatly respects.
- Take Tomoe (巴タケ Tomoe Take?): Mother of Musashi.

=== Dinosaur Empire ===
- Emperor Gore (帝王ゴール, Teiō Gōru)Voiced by: Hiromu Jin - The supreme commander of the Dinosaur Empire. In the second volume of the original manga, Gore was abandoned by his people when they are forced to return to the earth. In the manga he decided that he will die honorably by battling Getter Robo, however even this chance was stolen from him when a Hyaki empire mech opened fire on his ship, killing him. In the anime he, along with the rest of the empire, died when Musashi crashed the Command Machine into the Mighty Battleship Dai.
- General Bat (バット将軍, Batto Shōgun) Voiced by: Kenichi Ogata - Emperor Gore's field commander.
- Chief Galeli (ガレリィ長官, Gareri Chōkan) Voiced by: Keaton Yamada - Emperor Gore's chief of engineering and designer of mechasauruses. (In the manga it was stated he was the Prime Minister of Science). His name is possibly a reference to Galileo Galilei.
- Great Demon Yura (大魔人ユラー, Dai Majin Yurā) Voiced by: Kouji Yada - Emperor Gore's master, very little is known about this very tall demon aside from being a member of the Hyakki Empire that appears in Getter Robo G. Has the power to manipulate the ground to his will.
- Chiryu Clan (Volume 2 chapter 8): members of this clan were sent to destroy the Getter robo. the members were Dera (who has a blade on the spine and can spin fast enough to dig through the ground); Garo (who can extend his middle horn to stab his opponent, has two brain, two hearts and six lungs, giving him the ability to revive.); Neon the leader and three others. All born into the Chiryu clan are born with mysterious power. They are considered outcasts even by the Dinosaur Empire. They see the war as a chance to move the chiryu clan up in the Dinosaur Empire.
- Mechasaurus: All Mechasauruses in the series are capable of surviving in magma and those without requiring to flight can burrow very fast; however, as demonstrated in episode 16 with Geru, mechasauruses cannot survive in magma if it moves on them with enough force to cause an eruption. They appear in every episode of Getter Robo.

=== Hyakki Empire ===
- Emperor Burai (ブライ大帝, Burai Taitei): The emperor of the Hyakki Empire, or The Hundred Demon Empire when translated literally.
- General Hidler: Burai's field commander that resembles Adolf Hitler.
- Professor Gura: Burai's chief engineer and designer of the Mecha Oni (Hyakki Robots). Alternatively his name is translated as Graw.
- Mecha Oni (Appear in every episode): The Mecha Oni (also called Hyakki Robots) are the primary war machines of the Hyakki Empire, being much stronger than the Mechasauruses and like them often burrow unless they can fly. With few exceptions all Mecha Oni are named after and resemble their pilots. It is stated and proven in a few episodes that destroying their horns will critically weaken if not destroy them.

== Getter Robo Go ==
- Go Ichimonji (一文字 號, ichimonji gō; played by Takeshi Kusao): The 17-year-old main pilot of the Getter.
- Sho Tachibana (橘 翔, tachibana shō; played by Yuko Kobayashi): The 16-year-old daughter of Doctor Tachibana and sister of Shinichi. After her brother dies and the Getter is improved, she becomes another pilot of the robot.
- Gai Daido (大道 剴, daidō gai; played by Akira Kamiya): The third pilot of the Getter. A 17-year-old man, he is the most prudent and conscious of the three. Before becoming a pilot of the robot, he was the pilot of one of the helicopters which helped the robot.
- Doctor Tachibana (橘博士, tachibana-hakase; played by Ichiro Nagai): The head coordinator of the Getter Robot project and father of Sho and Shinichi. At first, he is reluctant to use Getter Robot as a weapon until his son dies.
- Shinichi Tachibana (橘 信一, tachibana shinichi; played by Toshio Furukawa): The son of Doctor Tachibana and brother of Sho. A helicopter pilot of the Getter squadron. In order to help Getter defeat a Metal Beast, he sacrifices himself. It is his death which prompts Doctor Tachibana to change the robot into a combat weapon capable of transforming in different forms.
- Yuji Muto (武藤 由自, mutō yūji; played by Junichi Kanemaru): The informatics and programmer expert of the Getter squadron, who works mainly at the base of the NISAR. He is also the pilot of the flying ship which transports the Getter Robot after its battles.
- Lee Foa May (リー・フォア・メイ, rī foa mei; played by Eriko Hara): A nurse at the NISAR who treats the pilots and has a special relationship with Go.
- Dr. Pochi (Dr.ポチ; played by Masaharu Sato) & Dr. Tama (Dr.タマ; played by Isamu Tanonaka): The assistants of Doctor Tachibana and the main comic relief of the series.
- Doctor Yoshii (吉井博士, yoshii-hakase; played by Kohei Miyauchi): A scientist who collaborates in the Getter project.
- Remi Yoshii (吉井レミ; played by Miyako Endo): The daughter of Doctor Yoshii.
- Akira Daido (大道 哲, daidō akira; played by Chie Sato): The younger brother of Gai Daido.
- Okada (岡田; played by Yuki Sato): One of the candidates to become a pilot of Getter.
- Nakano (中野; played by Taiki Matsuno): One of the main mechanics in the NISAR base
- Professor Rando (プロフェッサー・ランドウ, purofessā randō; played by Daisuke Gori): A preeminent scientist in robotic engineering who wishes to conquer the world.
- Baron Yasha (ヤシャ男爵, yasha-danshaku; played by Masaharu Sato (older brother) and Michihiro Ikemizu (younger brother)): A strange being which has a body with two heads, one blue and one red.
- Count Rasetsu (ラセツ伯爵, rasetsu-hakushaku; played by Michiko Abe (female) and Ichiro Nagai (male)): A servant of Professor Rando and a cloned being. It often is at odds with Baron Yasha for Yasha's lack of ability in battle. It has a male face in its breast.
- Viscount Narquise (ナルキス子爵, narukisu-shishaku; played by Ryo Horikawa)

== Getter Machines ==
Getter Robo is composed of 3 jet-like vehicles piloted by one of the three pilots.

=== Technological & Historical ===
Originally designed for space travel, the Getter Robo was created by Dr. Saotome at the Saotome Institute, harnessing the infinite power of the Getter Rays as its power source. Getter Robo is made up three jets, known as the Get Machines, that combine into one solitary super robot. Depending on the combination order of the jets, a different Getter can be formed, for a maximum of 3 forms. To align in the right formation, a monitor in the Getter Machines' cockpits are shown for the pilot to follow. The Getter Robo however can only be piloted by people of strong conditions both physically and mentally, and despite that reinforced pilot suits are issued to the pilots, the immense pressure and G-force caused by piloting a Getter machine could still overwhelm a normal person. The Getter Robo doesn't require all 3 pilots onboard to be piloted, however it will be harder to control and its combat efficiency is said to be reduced to less than 50%. A common technique used by Getter Robo is the "Open Get" (オープンゲット) maneuver that causes the Get Machines to detach from each other at flashing speed, not only allowing the Getter to switch forms quickly but to also escape dangerous situations.

In the "Crater Battle" special chapter (prequel to Getter Robo Armageddon) bundled in the Shin Getter Robo manga, the 3 individual Getter Robos had shown the ability to dock with each other and become a powerful cannon turret, with Getter-3 unveiling a firing port from the tip of its Jaguar-Gou, Getter-2 docking above Getter-3 and Getter-1 docking above Getter-2, while also extending energy tubes from its belly into Getter-2 and Getter-3.

=== Get Machines ===
The Get Machines (ゲットマシン) are jet-like vehicles that serve as the components to the Getter Robo, they feature a special anti-gravity flight system that allows them to fly for long periods of time and are composed of Getter Alloy, a shape-memory alloy that allow the aircraft to change shape and combine. Each Get Machine contains an autopilot function that allows them to be controlled from different areas but the Getter Robo will not as powerful without three pilots in control. Their maximum speed is Mach 0.9 but their mobility and acceleration are different with each one.

- Eagle-Gou (イーグル号)

The red colored Getter Machine with high mobility features. It is armed with a small beam gun and rockets and is later given a machine gun for additional fire power. It is mainly piloted by Ryouma Nagare. In Shin Getter Robo, Benkei Kuruma piloted it once.

- Jaguar-Gou (ジャガー号)

The white colored Getter Machine with aerodynamic features. It has a high acceleration module that uses NO1 to boost. Its nozzle contains an area for the Getter Beam and is armed with small missiles. It is chiefly piloted by Hayato Jin. In Shin Getter Robo, Shou Miyazaki piloted it once.

- Bear-Gou (ベアー号)

The yellow colored Getter Machine that features great stability. It is armed with a pair of large missile launchers on both sides. It is initially piloted by Dr. Saotome before being passed on to Musashi Tomoe after he joins the Getter Team. In Shin Getter Robo, Gousetsu Naito piloted it once.

=== Robot Mode ===
- Getter-1
  - Order: Eagle + Jaguar + Bear
  - Pilot: Ryouma Nagare

Getter-1 is the most commonly used Getter formation of the three. It is somewhat geared toward aerial combat, however it can fight in almost any situation. The most balanced amongst the three modes in both speed and combat, is that it is equipped with the Getter Tomahawk (which doubles as a boomerang) and the Getter beam, a highly concentrated beam of pure Getter Energy that can destroy many of the Getter's foes. It is able to fly through the cape-like attachment on its back called the Getter Wing that acts as an anti-gravity cloak. It is also able to survive reentry into the atmosphere as it was designed for space travel.

- Getter-2
  - Order: Jaguar + Bear + Eagle
  - Pilot: Hayato Jin

Getter-2 is the second most commonly used Getter. Its left arm features a drill while its right arm resembles a pair of pliers that possess powerful grip strength that can tear an opponent apart. It is more geared toward land and underground combat and it has limited flight capabilities with the boosters on its feet, but it does not work well underwater. Getter-2's advantage over the others is that it can move at incredible speeds, especially when moving underground. When running it can create after images because of how fast it is. However, Getter-2's armor is not as physically strong as the other Getter modes. It is coated in a heat resistant apparatus that allows it to travel in magma for a short period of time. In Getter Robo Armageddon, Getter-2 has the Getter Drill and the Getter Arm switch places.

- Getter-3
  - Order: Bear + Eagle + Jaguar
  - Pilot: Musashi Tomoe, Benkei Kuruma

Getter-3 is the least used of all Getter modes. It is geared more towards rough land and sea combat due to its tank-like nature. Getter-3's advantage is its incredible strength and defensive capabilities. Its armor is built to withstand water pressures, but there is a limit to how much it can hold. Its fists also have a long range due to its arms being able to extend to certain lengths. Despite its range, strength, and armor the fact that it is a tank makes it less efficient than Getter-1 and 2 and is therefore used less.

=== Weapons ===
- Getter-1
  - Getter Beam (ゲッタービーム) - A pink-colored beam of Getter Energy, fired from Getter-1's stomach. The beam is Getter-1's most powerful weapon, and is particularly dangerous to enemies who are sensitive to Getter Rays (which typically includes most Getter villains).
  - Spiral Getter Beam (スパイラルゲッタービーム) - Getter-1 fires its Getter Beam while covered in its Getter Wing cape, resulting in it spreading and spiraling outwards, hitting multiple enemies.
  - Getter Tomahawk (ゲッタートマホーク) - A gigantic hand axe, and Getter-1's main melee weapon. The robot can wield two at a time, although it only uses one in the original series.
  - Tomahawk Boomerang (トマホークブーメラン) - Getter-1 throws the tomahawk. It spins extremely quickly, cutting through anything it hits like a buzzsaw. Typically the weapon will curve in mid-air, hitting moving enemies and returning to the Getter after striking its target.
  - Getter Machine Gun (ゲッターマシンガン) - A pair of 4-barrel rotating machine guns folded within the forearms, they are deployed using sub-arms and handheld when used. It is capable of piercing through Getter Robo G's armor. Only seen in Armageddon and video games.
  - Missile Machine Gun (ミサイルマシンガン) - A giant Gatling gun that fires destructive homing missiles, stored on Getter-1's back when not in use. Only seen in the manga and video games.
- Getter-2
  - Getter Arm - Getter-2 can use its claw as a crushing weapon.
  - Getter Drill (AKA Drill Arm) - Getter-2 strikes an enemy with the drill attached to its left arm.
  - Drill Missile (AKA Drill Punch, Drill Attack or Jet Drill) - The drill spins quickly and is launched at an opponent like a rocket. The aftereffects of the attack vary by series and battle - sometimes the drill returns to the Getter, sometimes it falls to the ground, and sometimes it explodes. Losing the drill does not prevent the Getter from changing forms.
  - Drill Storm (AKA Getter Hurricane or Getter Storm) - The drill spins at extremely high speeds, creating a tornado extending forward from the tip. Enemies caught in the winds are immobilized.
  - Getter Vision - (AKA Mach Special) Moving at high-speeds as high as mach 3, Getter-2 can create afterimages of itself to confuse opponents.
  - Getter Beams (manga only) - Getter-2 has been shown to fire a pair of Getter Beams from its eyes that are capable of hitting underground targets. It used them only once to destroy a pair of tunneling torpedoes.
- Getter-3
  - Getter Missile - Getter-3 fires a pair of missiles attached to the sides of its head.
  - Getter Smash (Seen only in video games) - Getter-3 extends its arms and performs a double punch.
  - Getter Crush (Seen only in video games) - Getter-3 does a left-right hook punch combo followed by a double hook punch.
  - Ganseki Otoshi (Seen in Episode 10) - Getter-3 crushes an enemy by landing on it.
  - Daisetsuzan Oroshi - Getter-3 grabs an enemy and uses its extending arms to spin them above its head, followed by a devastating throw attack. The technique is based on Musashi's signature judo throw, which is a modified Hammer Throw.
  - Machine Guns (Getter Robo: Armageddon only) - In the Armageddon OVA, Getter-3 was armed with machine guns on the tank part of its body.
