= Akeno Watanabe =

Japanese voice actress and narrator

- 渡辺 明乃
- Born: November 18, 1982 (age 43); Funabashi, Chiba Prefecture, Japan
- Occupations: Voice actress; narrator
- Years active: 2001–present
- Agent: Office Osawa

Akeno Watanabe (渡辺 明乃, Watanabe Akeno; born November 18, 1982) is a Japanese voice actress and narrator affiliated with Office Osawa. Some of her notable voice roles include Robin Sena in Witch Hunter Robin, Chachamaru Karakuri in Negima! Magister Negi Magi, Halle Lidner in Death Note, Rito Yuki in To Love Ru, Liz Thompson in Soul Eater, Midnight in My Hero Academia, Hitch Dreyse in Attack on Titan, Gou Matsuoka in Free!, Hamsuke in Overlord, and Kneesocks in New Panty and Stocking with Garterbelt.

== Filmography ==
=== Anime ===
List of voice performances in anime
Year	Title	Role	Notes	Source
2001	I My Me! Strawberry Eggs	Fuko Kuzuha		
2001	Hikaru no Go	Match recorder, secretary, Kumiko Tsuda		
2002	Witch Hunter Robin	Robin Sena		
2002	Heat Guy J	You Eclair		
2002–2007	Naruto	Tayuya		
2003	Someday's Dreamers	Angela Charon Brooks		
2003	E's Otherwise	Shin-lu Belvedere		
2003	Kaleido Star	Anna Heart		
2003	Divergence Eve	Yun		
2003	Yami to Bōshi to Hon no Tabibito	Kunou Suzaku		
2003	Hellsing	Jessica		
2004	Paranoia Agent	Reiko Kiuchi		
2004	Burst Angel	Jo		
2004	Kurau: Phantom Memory	Mika		
2004	Onmyō Taisenki	Girl B		
2005	Starship Operators	Hisaka Arei		
2005–2011	Negima! series	Chachamaru Karakuri		
2005–2006	Ah My Buddha series	Haruka Amanogawa		
2005	Idaten Jump	Sho Yamato		
2005–2021	Aria series	Albert "Al" Pitt, President Maa		
2006–present	Utawarerumono series	Dori & Gura, Hauenkua	Also 2022 series	
2006	Duel Masters Flash	Rei Kukami		
2006	Project Blue Earth SOS	Billy Kimura		
2006	Night Head Genesis	Fukami Shouko, Futami Natsuko		
2006	Death Note	Halle Lidner		
2006–2007	Negima!?	Chachamaru Karakuri		
2006–2021	Gintama	Mutsu		
2006–2008	Code Geass series	Villetta Nu		
2006	Pénélope tête en l'air うっかりぺネロぺ	Aladdin		
2007–2012	Shakugan no Shana series	Tiamat		
2008–2016	To Love Ru series	Rito Yuki	Also OVAs, Motto, Darkness, and Darkness 2nd	
2008–2009	Soul Eater	Liz Thompson		
2008	Ikki Tousen	Housen Ryofu		
2008–2011	A Certain Magical Index series	Sherry Cromwell	Also second season	
2009	Phantom: Requiem for the Phantom	Lizzie Garland		
2009	Slap-up Party: Arad Senki	Roxy		
2009	Guin Saga	Lady Amnelis		
2009–2010	Cross Game	Midori Koganezawa		
2009	Kobato	Toshihiko		
2009	Bokura no Saibanin Monogatari (Our Jury Story)		short film commissioned by Japanese government	
2010	Metal Fight Beyblade	Reiji Mizuchi		
2010–2011	HeartCatch PreCure!	Sayaka Uejima		
2010	Asobi ni iku yo!	Sara		
2010	Pocket Monsters: Best Wishes	Shooty, Satoshi's Zuruggu, Bel's Chaoboo/Enbuoh		
2010–2013	Oreimo series	Yoshino Kosaka		
2011–2012	Freezing	Yumi Kim	Also Vibration	
2011	Little Battlers Experience	Saki Kitajima		
2011	Battle Girls: Time Paradox	Hattori Hanzo		
2011	Blue Exorcist	Rin Okumura (child)		
2011	Manyū Hiken-chō	Momoha		
2011	Tekken: Blood Vengeance	Anna Williams		
2011	Hime Gal Paradise	Tochiotome		
2011–2012	Battle Spirits: Heroes バトルスピリッツ覇王	Thamel Tachibana		
2012	Pocket Monsters: Best Wishes! Season 2	Shooty, Satoshi's Zuruggu, Bel's Enbuoh		
2013–2023	Attack on Titan	Hitch Dreyse		
2013	Pocket Monsters: Best Wishes! Season 2: Episode N	Angie, Satoshi's Zuruggu		
2013	Majestic Prince	Ange Kuroki		
2013	Pocket Monsters: Best Wishes! Season 2: Decolora Adventure	Satoshi's Zuruggu		
2013–present	Free! series	Gou Matsuoka, Rin Matsuoka (child)		
2013	Sunday Without God	Anna		
2013	Beyond the Boundary	Shizuku Ninomiya		
2014	Nobunagun	Dogoo		
2015	Mobile Suit Gundam: The Origin	Kycilia Zabi		
2015–2018	Overlord	Hamsuke		
2016–2025	My Hero Academia	Midnight, young Midoriya Izuku, Mika Jiro		
2017	Konohana Kitan	Okiku	Eps. 5–12	
2019	Isekai Quartet	Hamsuke	Eps. 7, 10	
2019	Is It Wrong to Try to Pick Up Girls in a Dungeon? II	Aisha Belka		
2019	KonoSuba: God's Blessing on This Wonderful World! Legend of Crimson	Sylvia	Film	
2020–2021	Healin' Good Pretty Cure	Kedary	Eps. 28	
2020	Super HxEros	Genmuchuu	Ep. 7	
2020	Wandering Witch: The Journey of Elaina	Selena's Mother	Ep. 9	
2021	Tropical-Rouge! Pretty Cure	Dr. Numeri, Akiho Kirishima		
2022	The Executioner and Her Way of Life	Sicilia		
2022	Engage Kiss	Akino Yugiri		
2022	JoJo's Bizarre Adventure: Stone Ocean	Gloria Costello	ONA	
2022	To Your Eternity 2nd Season	Todo		
2023	Giant Beasts of Ars	Kuumi Katsu		
2024	The Wrong Way to Use Healing Magic	Blurin		
2024	Grendizer U	Lady Gandal		
2025	My Hero Academia: Vigilantes	Nemuri Kayama/Midnight		
2025	New Saga	Leila		
2025	New Panty & Stocking with Garterbelt	Kneesocks		
2025	Plus-Sized Misadventures in Love!	Yumeko's mother		
2026	Marronnier Ōkoku no Shichinin no Kishi	Baribara		
2026	Made in Abyss: Mezameru Shinpi	Nishagora		

=== Video games ===
List of voice performances in video games
Year	Title	Role	Notes	Source
2003	Final Fantasy X-2	Shinra		
2003	2nd Super Robot Wars Alpha	Ibis Douglas		
2004	Tales of Rebirth	Mao		
2005	3rd Super Robot Wars Alpha: To the End of the Galaxy	Ibis Douglas		
2005	Naruto: Gekitō Ninja Taisen! 4	Tayuya		
2009–2014	Street Fighter IV series	Rose		
2010	Xenoblade Chronicles	Sharla		
2015	Xenoblade Chronicles X	Ga Bow		
2020	The Last of Us Part II	Nora		
2021	Street Fighter V	Rose		
2022	Xenoblade Chronicles 3	Monica		
2023	Xenoblade Chronicles 3: Future Redeemed	Panacea		

=== Drama CDs ===
List of voice performances in drama CDs
Title	Role	Source
Hot Gimmick Compact Disc	Akane Narita	
Hot Gimmick Compact Disc 2	Akane Narita	
To Aru Majutsu no Index Archives 2	Sherry Cromwell	
To Aru Majutsu no Index II Archives 2	Sherry Cromwell	
Code Geass Lelouch of the Rebellion	Viletta	
Code Geass Lelouch of the Rebellion R2 Sound Episode 1	Viletta	
Godannar		
Splendide Shana		
Superiority Shana III Vol. 2		
To Love-Ru	Rito Yuuki	
Attack on Titan: Lost Girls	Hitch Dreyse	

=== Dubbing ===
List of voice performances in overseas dubbing
Title	Role	Dub for	Notes	Source
Annabelle: Creation	Sister Charlotte	Stephanie Sigman		
The Bay	DS/DC Lisa Armstrong	Morven Christie		
Beast	Meredith Samuels	Iyana Halley		
The Bold Type	Sutton Brady	Meghann Fahy		
Cinderella	Cinderella	Camila Cabello		
The Color Purple	Celie Harris-Johnson	Fantasia Barrino		
Drive Angry	Piper	Amber Heard		
Extraction 2	Ketevan	Tinatin Dalakishvili		
Gen V	Indira Shetty	Shelley Conn		
Glee	Becky Jackson	Lauren Potter		
Ingrid Goes West	Ingrid Thorburn	Aubrey Plaza		
Lake Placid: Legacy	Jade	Katherine Barrell		
Lost in Space	Penny Robinson	Lacey Chabert		
The Marvels	Talia	Leila Farzad		
Meet the Blacks	Lorena	Zulay Henao		
The Numbers Station	Katherine	Malin Åkerman		
Patti Cake$	Patti	Danielle Macdonald		
The Pope's Exorcist	Julia Vasquez	Alex Essoe		
Power Rangers Mystic Force	Vida Rocca/ Pink Mystic Ranger	Angie Diaz		
Pretty in Pink	Andie Walsh	Molly Ringwald		
Sonic the Hedgehog 3	Director Rockwell	Krysten Ritter		
ZeroZeroZero	Emma Lynwood	Andrea Riseborough		
Zoe	Zoe	Léa Seydoux		

Animation
Title	Role	Notes	Source
The Buzz on Maggie	Maggie Pesky		
Puss in Boots: The Last Wish	Mama Luna		
Spider-Man: Into the Spider-Verse	Olivia "Liv" Octavius / Doctor Octopus		
Steven Universe	Stevonnie		
Unikitty!	Dr. Fox		

Video games
Title	Role	Notes	Source
Spider-Man 2	Danika Hart		
