= Akira Kamiya =

Japanese voice actor (born 1946)

- 神谷 明
- Born: September 18, 1946 (age 80); Yokohama, Japan
- Occupations: Voice actor; actor; singer; narrator
- Years active: 1970–present
- Agent: Saeba Shoji
- Children: 2
- Website: Official website

Akira Kamiya (神谷 明, Kamiya Akira; born September 18, 1946) is a Japanese voice actor.

He has portrayed several notable roles in television anime series such as Kenshiro in Fist of the North Star, Ryo Saeba in City Hunter, Shutaro Mendo in Urusei Yatsura, and Kogoro Mori in Detective Conan. In mecha anime, he voiced Ryoma Nagare in Getter Robo, Akira Hibiki in Brave Raideen, Sanshirō Tsuwabuki in Gaiking, Roy Focker in The Super Dimension Fortress Macross, and Sincline in Beast King GoLion.

== Biography ==
=== Early life ===
Kamiya was born in Yokohama. He graduated from Tokyo Metropolitan Shiba Commercial High School and became a freelancer after being affiliated with Theatre Echo, Aoni Production, Production Baobab, Tokyo Actor's Consumer's Cooperative Society and Ups. Kamiya then founded Saeba Shoji, a talent agency.

=== Background ===
His father ran a furniture manufacturing factory, but it suddenly closed and his parents divorced. After that, Kamiya's mother raised him and his brother. As a result of his mother's search for work, he attended many schools over the years, from Aoki Elementary School in Yokohama to Higashidai Elementary School in Tsurumi and Aioi elementary school in Ota-ku, Tokyo. The presence of actor Shoichi Ozawa as the eldest of Aioi Ko led Kamiya on the road to drama.

After that, he entered the Tokyo Metropolitan Tateshiba Commercial High School via Misono Junior High School. Kamiya's friend invited him to join the drama club, saying that, "I think Kamiya has a good voice." At that time, it was more difficult to become an actor than previously and difficult to advance in the field. Kamiya told his mother, "I want to be an actor. I will do my best because it is the path I chose myself." Later, he recalled, "If [I] were [my] mother, [I] might have stopped crying." After graduating from high school, he joined the amateur theater company Kanza in Yokohama.

=== Activities as a voice actor ===
In 1970, Kamiya debuted as an anime voice actor playing the role of Senkichi in the TV anime Mahō no Mako-chan during the Theatre Echo study period. The first regular role was Sasuke Yashima in Akakichi no Eleven. He appeared as Koichi Furumi in Babel II, and also learned his trademark "scream" with this work. Since then, he has been in charge of several prominent roles chiefly in robot animation works, such as Ryoma Nagare in Getter Robo. He was called "Screaming Kamiya" because he kept screaming his special moves. One of the notable voice actors in the Super Robot Wars video game series, Kamiya himself appeared on TV commercials when Super Robot Wars F was released.

In the 1980s, he appeared in several animated manga series serialised in Weekly Shōnen Jump. He appeared in Kinnikuman, Fist of the North Star, and City Hunter, and was also known as one of the voice actors familiar with Jump anime. Since many of these Shōnen Jump anime have become long-running series, the works that appeared during this time are often introduced as Akira Kamiya's masterpiece.

He often narrates commercials and variety shows, including the hero show commercial of Tokyo Dome City Attractions (former Korakuen Yuenchi), which is primarily broadcast on the Super Sentai series frame, and has been in charge of narration for over 20 years since 1986.

He became the recipient of Animage's Grand Prix prize.

On January 9, 2017, the program was broadcast on TV Asahi and was ranked 22nd in "200 Popular Voice Actors Seriously Selected! Voice Actor General Election! 3 Hours SP".

=== Other activities ===
Kamiya was initially a bass player with the popular voice actor's musical group Slapstick, which was active in the 1970s and 1980s. However, he expressed his concern that his schedule was busy, and the performance activities he had enjoyed as an amateur band in a harmonious manner would be produced as professional singer activities, and he offered to withdraw.

He has worked as a radio personality for All Night Nippon. He is the first regular personality as a voice actor. In the same program, he made a corner called "Guinness!". He knew what he was doing at MBS Young Town, and he still has friends.

In 1979, he played personality with Mitsuko Horie on a Sunday afternoon radio program called "Mitsuko and Akira's Deadly Handgun," and released a duet single, "Oh! Sunday Youth is Sunday."

In addition to working as a singer in Purin Purin Monogatari and Fist of the North Star, he also performed in the early 1980s with Kazuyuki Sogabe, Ryūsei Nakao and Naoya Uchida.

In the aftermath of the Hanshin-Awaji earthquake in 1995, he formed a charity unit "WITH YOU". He was also active in the Fureai Concert.

== Filmography ==
=== Animation ===
List of voice performances in animation
Year	Title	Role	Notes	Source
1970	Akakichi no Eleven	Sasuke Yashima		
1970	Mahō no Mako-chan	Senkichi		
1971	Marvelous Melmo	Taro Kato 加藤太郎		
1972	Pinocchio: The Series	Narrator		
1972	Moonlight Mask	Azerander アゼランダー		
1972	Triton of the Sea	Seabird 海鳥		
1972	Gatchaman	Romina		
1973	Babel II	Koichi Furumi a.k.a. Babel II	Debut major role	
1973	Fables of the Green Forest	Tommy from Shiyuu しじゅうからのトミー		
1973	Kōya no Shōnen Isamu	Isamu		
1973	Zero Tester	Shin Fubuki		
1973	Miracle Girl Limit-chan	Jun Kurimoto		
1973	Casshan	Android No. 5		
1973	Karate Master	Shingo Ariake / Susumu Adachi 有明省吾 / 安達すすむ		
1974	Getter Robo	Ryoma Nagare		
1974	Space Battleship Yamato	Saburo Kato		
1975	Brave Raideen	Akira Hibiki		
1975	Getter Robo G	Ryoma Nagare		
1975	Arabian Nights: Sinbad's Adventures	Ali Baba		
1975	Time Bokan	Prince / Isochi 王子 / イソッチ		
1975	Grendizer	Boys Command Corps Einz 少年コマンド隊アインス		
1975	Ikkyū-san	Tetsuji 哲斉	6 – 7 episodes	
1976	Gaiking	Sanshirō Tsuwabuki		
1976	Machine Hayabusa ja:マシンハヤブサ	Will · Plague ウイル・プラーグ		
1976	Gowappa 5 Gōdam	Ichiro Togawa 戸川一郎		
1976	Blocker Gundan 4 Machine Blaster	Ichiro Ueta 発田一郎	Ep. 13	
1976	Dokaben	Satoru Satonaka		
1977	Yatterman	Sasuke サスケ		
1977	Jetter Mars	Adios アディオス		
1977	Mechander Robo	Jimmy Orion		
1977	Wakusei Robo Danguard Ace	Ichimonji Takuma		
1977	Attack on Tomorrow	Ichiro Fushima 伏島一郎		
1977	Glacier Warrior Gaislugger ja:氷河戦士ガイスラッガー	Mito Kaya ミト・カヤ		
1977	Nobody's Boy: Remi	Markano マルカーノ		
1977	Super Super Car Game ja:超スーパーカー ガッタイガー	Eric Bergen エリック・ベルゲン		
1977	Angie Girl	Howard		
1978	Majokko Tickle	Saburo		
1978	Space Pirate Captain Harlock	Tadashi Daiba		
1978	Tōshō Daimos	Kazuya Ryūzaki		
1978	Red Peacock ja:紅孔雀	Ubu Sleeper / Kotemoku / Kumagoro 浮寝丸 / コテモク / 熊五郎		
1978	Galaxy Express 999	Pliers プライダー		
1978	Treasure Island	Papy		
1978	Space Battleship Yamato II	Saburo Kato		
1978	Captain Future	John Walker		
1979	Do Your Best! Our Hit End Run ja:がんばれ！ ぼくらのヒット・エンド・ラン	Ao Lu 葵麻呂		
1979	Purine Princess Story ja:プリンプリン物語	Bon Bon / General Rugi / Zero Zero Seven Henna Kivun ボンボン / ルチ将軍 / ゼロゼロセブン・ヘンナキブン		
1979	Animation Kikou Marco Polo no Boken ja:アニメーション紀行 マルコ・ポーロの冒険	Chapandu		
1979	Tomorrow's Braves ja:あしたの勇者たち	Ichiki Kota 一本木蹴太		
1979	King Arthur	Arthur		
1980	King Arthur: Prince on White Horse	Arthur		
1980	Space Warrior Baldios	Douglas		
1980	Astro Boy	Zeus		
1980	Space Battleship Yamato III	Shiro Kato		
1981	Beast King GoLion	Prince Sincline		
1981–86	Urusei Yatsura	Shutaro Mendo		
1982	Patalliro!	Tamanegi		
1982	The Super Dimension Fortress Macross	Roy Focker		
1983	Future Police Urashiman	Claude Mizusawa		
1983	Skyward Operation ja:亜空大作戦スラングル	George ジョージ		
1983	Kinnikuman	Kinnikuman (Kinniku Suguru), Tatsunori Kinniku		
1983	Manga Japanese History ja:まんが日本史	Mori Ranmaru		
1983	Galactic Whirlwind Sasuraiger	Ron Good ロン・グッド		
1983	Nine	Kentarō Yamanaka	2 seasons	
1983–84	Plawres Sanshiro	Bill Thomas		
1983	Igano Kabamaru	Shizune Mejiro		
1984	Oyoneko Boo-nyan ja:オヨネコぶーにゃん	Oyoyo (Boo-nyan)		
1984	Car Graphic TV ja:カーグラフィックTV	Narrator		
1984–88	Fist of the North Star	Kenshiro		
1984	Sherlock Hound	Engineer		
1985–86	Mujigen Hunter Fandora	Kue	OVA series	
1985	Shonen Jump Special: Kochira Katsushika-ku Kameari Kōen-mae Hashutsujo	Keiichi Nakagawa 中川圭一	Screened at "Shonen Jump festival" sponsored by Shueisha	
1985	Button Nose	Chikutakubon		
1986–88	Maison Ikkoku	Shun Mitaka		
1986	Animated Classics of Japanese Literature	Mizushima (student)		
1986	Saint Seiya	Perseus Algol, Dubhe Alpha Siegfried		
1986	Outlanders	Nao	OVA	
1987	Elf 17 ja:エルフ・17	Mascot Tyler	OVA	
1987	Hokuto no Ken 2	Kenshiro		
1987–99	City Hunter series and specials	Ryō Saeba		
1987	Ox Tales	Booth		
1987	City Hunter	Ryō Saeba		
1987	Tekkamen Wo Oe: "D'Artagnan Monogatari" Yori ja:鉄仮面を追え 「ダルタニャン物語」より	Athos アトス	TV special prior to TV series	
1987	Maps	Abe Edinburgh	OVA	
1987	Dangaioh	Roll Kran	OVA	
1987	Norakuro-kun	Prince		
1987	The Three Musketeers Anime	Athos		
1987	Phoenix: Yamato/Space Chapter	Goro Makimura	OVA	
1987	City Hunter 2	Ryō Saeba		
1988	Doctor Chichibuyama ja:ドクター秩父山	Chichibuyama		
1988	Starship Troopers	Sgt. Charles Zim		
1989	Legend of the Galactic Heroes	Bagdash	OVA	
1989	Dog Soldier	John Kyosuke Hiba	OVA	
1989	Yawara! A Fashionable Judo Girl	Shinnosuke Kazamatsuri		
1989	Time Travel Tondekeman	Prince Dandarn		
1990	Mōretsu Atarō	Nyarome	2nd TV series	
1990	Yagami-kun no Katei no Jijō	Akira Yokkaichi	OVA	
1990–1991	Record of Lodoss War	Ashram		
1990	Masuyama High School Koshien Hen version ja:緑山高校 甲子園編	Kenji Sadamaru 佐田丸健二	OVA	
1990	Happyakuyachou Hyouri no Kewaishi ja:八百八町表裏 化粧師	Shikitei Kosanbaspace 式亭小三馬		
1991	Getter Robo Go	Highway 大道剴		
1991	Hyokkori Gourd Island ひょっこりひょうたん島（リメイク版）	rearview mirror バックミラー		
1991	Kinnikuman: Scramble for the Throne	Kinnikuman (Kinniku Suguru)		
1994	Sailor Moon S	Prof. Souichi Tomoe 土萠創一教授		
1994	Otaku no Seiza	Indora	OVA Ep. 2	
1995	Chouriki Sentai Ohranger	Gammajin ガンマジン		
1995–96	Yamato 2520	Richard	OVA series	
1995	World Classic Children's Story Series Wow! Fairy Tale ja:世界名作童話シリーズ ワ～ォ！メルヘン王国	Sinbad		
1996–2009	Detective Conan	Kogoro Mori	Eps. 001–548. Later replaced by Rikiya Koyama in 2009 from Eps. 553–onward.	
1996	Sailor Moon Sailor Stars	Prof. Souichi Tomoe 土萠創一教授	Ep. 166 seen in the opening scene.	
1997	Cutie Honey Flash	Takeshi Kisaragi 如月猛		
1998	All Purpose Cultural Cat Girl Nuku Nuku	Kyusaku Natsume		
1998	Twilight of the Dark Master	Kaoru (Huang Long)	OVA	
1998	Change!! Getter Robo: The Last Day of the World	Narrator	OVA series	
1999	Voicelugger	Shogun γ (Gamma) 将軍γ（ｶﾞﾝﾏ）	Tokusatsu	
2000	Platinumhugen Ordian	Masaki Yayoi 哉生正樹	Ep. 16	
2000	Brigadoon: Marin & Melan	Custon Brown クストン・ブラウン		
2001	The Family's Defensive Alliance	Mamoru Daichi		
2001	Great Dangaioh	Roll Kulan		
2002	Macross Zero	Roy Focker	OVA	
2003	Rumic Theater	Toshio Furuta / Shinonome 古田年男 / 東雲		
2004	Arkue and Gachinpo ja:アークエとガッチンポー	Santa Boss サンタボス		
2005–06	Angel Heart	Ryo Saeba		
2006	Hey! Spring of Trivia ja:トリビアの泉	Silhouette of Kenshiro		
2010	Kobe and Ai		Special guest appearance for short film for City of Kobe Tourism	
2011	Ojarumaru	Moroboshi		
2012	Poyopoyo Kansatsu Nikki	Shigeru Satou, Ba		
2013	DD Fist of the North Star	Ryuken / Mamiyarinzo / Ishihara Ryu Jiro リュウケン / マミヤリンゾウ / 石原リュウ次郎		
2015	Kamisama Kiss◎	Priest bishop 僧正坊		
2015	DD Fist of the North Star 2	Ryuken リュウケン		
2016	Katsushika-ku Kameari Park Front Faction Place THE FINAL Kamitsuki Yoshitsuki The Last Day ja:こちら葛飾区亀有公園前派出所 THE FINAL 両津勘吉 最後の日	Kidnapper's leader 誘拐犯のリーダー		
2020	The Millionaire Detective Balance: Unlimited	Chōsuke Nakamoto		
2020	Warlords of Sigrdrifa	Odin		

=== Films ===
List of voice performances in film
Year	Title	Role	Notes	Source
1975	Great Mazinger vs. Getter Robo	Ryoma Nagare		
1975	Boy Tokugawa Ieyasu ja:少年徳川家康	又五郎		
1975	Great Mazinger vs. Getter Robo G: Kuchu Daigekitotsu	Ryoma Nagare		
1976	Grendizer, Getter Robo G, Great Mazinger: Kessen! Daikaijuu	Ryoma Nagare		
1977	Wakusei Robo Danguard Ace tai Konchu Robo Gundan 惑星ロボ ダンガードA対昆虫ロボット軍団	Takuma Ichimonji		
1978	Ringing Bell	Chirin		
1978	Farewell to Space Battleship Yamato	Saburo Kato		
1980	Toward the Terra	Seki Ray Shiroe		
1980	Be Forever Yamato	Shiro Kato		
1981	Devil and Princess Mimi ja:悪魔と姫ぎみ	Heathcliff ヒースクリフ		
1983	Urusei Yatsura: Only You	Shutaro Mendou		
1983	Final Yamato	Shiro Kato		
1983	How to enjoy professional baseball 10 times fun ja:プロ野球を10倍楽しく見る方法	Hala ハラ		
1984	Urusei Yatsura 2: Beautiful Dreamer	Shutaro Mendou		
1984	Ninja Huttiraku + Perman Superpowers Wars ja:忍者ハットリくん+パーマン 超能力ウォーズ	Psychoman		
1984	Macross: Do You Remember Love?	Roy Focker		
1984	Kinnikuman	Kinnikuman		
1984	Great Riot! Seigi Choujin	Kinnikuman		
1985	Urusei Yatsura 3: Remember My Love	Shutaro Mendou		
1985	Seigi Choujin vs. Ancient Choujin	Kinnikuman		
1985	Kinnikuman: Counterattack! The Underground Space Choujins	Kinnikuman		
1985	Kinnikuman: Hour of Triumph! Justice Superman	Kinnikuman		
1986	Urusei Yatsura 4: Lum the Forever	Shutaro Mendou		
1986	Fist of the North Star	Kenshiro		
1986	Kinnikuman: Crisis in New York!	Kinnikuman		
1986	They Were Eleven	Tadatos Lane タダトス・レーン		
1986	Kinnikuman: Justice Supermen vs. Fighter Supermen	Kinnikuman		
1988	Urusei Yatsura: The Final Chapter	Shutaro Mendou		
1988	Saint Seiya: Legend of Crimson Youth	Atlas of Karina カリナのアトラス		
1989	City Hunter: .357 Magnum	Ryo Saeba		
1989	Peacock King 2 Phantom Castle 孔雀王2 幻影城	sunlight 日光		
1989	Dragon Ball Z: Dead Zone	Garlic Jr.		
1989	Garaga ja:ギャラガ	On Boo / Robo オンブー / ロボ		
1990	City Hunter: Bay City Wars	Ryo Saeba		
1990	City Hunter: Million Dollar Conspiracy	Ryo Saeba		
1991	Urusei Yatsura: Always My Darling	Shutaro Mendou		
1993	Dr. Slump and Arale-chan: N-cha! From Penguin Village with Love	Dr. Mashirito		
1993	Tōi Umi kara Kita Coo	Tony Bottoms トニー・ボトムズ		
1994	How to enjoy the J league 100 times fun!! ja:Jリーグを100倍楽しく見る方法!!	Ruy Ramos		
1994	Dr. Slump and Arale-chan: N-cha!! Excited Heart of Summer Vacation	Dr. Mashirito		
1994	Pom Poko	Tamasaburo		
1995	Legend of Crystania	Ashram		
1997	The Doraemons: The Puzzling Challenge Letter of the Mysterious Thief Dorapin!	Dorapin		
1997	Case Closed: The Time Bombed Skyscraper	Kogoro Mori		
1998	Case Closed: The Fourteenth Target	Kogoro Mori		
1998	Slayers Gorgeous	Lord Culvert		
1999	Case Closed: The Last Wizard of the Century	Kogoro Mori		
2000	Case Closed: Captured in Her Eyes	Kogoro Mori		
2000	The Aurora ja:The AURORA 海のオーロラ	Ou Dragon 王玉竜		
2001	Case Closed: Countdown to Heaven	Kogoro Mori		
2001	Kinnikuman Second Generations	First Kinnikuman (Suguru) 初代キン肉マン（スグル）		
2002	Case Closed: The Phantom of Baker Street	Kogoro Mori		
2003	Detective Conan: Crossroad in the Ancient Capital	Kogoro Mori		
2004	Detective Conan: Magician of the Silver Sky	Kogoro Mori		
2005	Detective Conan: Strategy Above the Depths	Kogoro Mori		
2006	Detective Conan: The Private Eyes' Requiem	Kogoro Mori		
2007	Detective Conan: Jolly Roger in the Deep Azure	Kogoro Mori		
2008	Detective Conan: Full Score of Fear	Kogoro Mori		
2009	Lupin the 3rd vs. Detective Conan	Kogoro Mori	TV film	
2009	Detective Conan: The Raven Chaser	Kogoro Mori	Final Detective Conan film role as Kogoro Mori	
2013	Gintama: The Movie: The Final Chapter: Be Forever Yorozuya	Future Elizabeth		
2019	City Hunter the Movie: Shinjuku Private Eyes	Ryo Saeba		
2021	Child of Kamiari Month	Ōkuninushi		
2023	City Hunter The Movie: Angel Dust	Ryo Saeba		
2026	The Keeper of the Camphor Tree	Tōichirō Ōba		

=== Video games ===
List of voice performances in video games
Year	Title	Role	Notes	Source
1989	Red Alert ja:レッド・アラート	Guy Kazama	PC Engine	
1993	Tengai Makyō: Fuun Kabukiden	Sangue	PC Engine	
1994	Popful Mail	Blacky	PC Engine	
1995	Dragon Knight & Graffiti	Yamato Takeru	PC Engine	
1995	Linda Cube ja:リンダキューブ	Hume	PC	
1995–2000	Fist of the North Star games	Kenshiro		
1996	Tobal No. 1	Gren Kuts	PS1/PS2	
1996	Langrisser III	Grafting グラフト	SS	
1996-Present	Super Robot Wars series	Akira Hibiki, Ryoma Nagare		
1997	Super Robot Shooting ja:スーパーロボットシューティング	Ryoma Nagare, Hibiki	PS1/PS2	
1997	Tobal 2	Gren Kuts	PS1/PS2	
1997–2003	Macross games	Roy Focker		
1997	Momotaro Street Book ja:桃太郎道中記	Commentary / Great devil 実況 / 大悪魔	SS	
1998	Sakura Wars 2: Thou Shalt Not Die ja:サクラ大戦 2 ～君、死にたもうことなかれ～	Kyougoku Keigo	SS	
1998–2007	Detective Conan games	Kogoro Mori		
1999	Getter Robo Great Battle!	Ryoma Nagare, Narrator	PS1/PS2	
1999	Continuation · Mikagura Girls Detective Team ~ Final version ~ ja:続・御神楽少女探偵団 ～完結編～	Shogo Tokiwa 常磐省吾	PS1/PS2	
2002	Kingdom Hearts	Iago	PS2	
2002	Kinnikuman Nisei: New Generation vs. Legends	(Kinniku Suguru)	GC	
2003	Gekitō Pro Yakyū	Satoru Satonaka	PS2 (From Dokaben)	
2004	SEGA AGES 2500 Series Vol.11 Hokuto no Ken; SEGA AGES 2500シリーズ Vol.11 北斗の拳	Kenshiro ケンシロウ	PS1/PS2	
2006	Kinnikuman Muscle Generations	(Kinniku Suguru)	PSP	
2006	Another Century's Episode 2	Roy Focker	PS2	
2007	Another Century's Episode 3: The Final	Roy Focker	PS2	
2008	Macross Ace Frontier	Roy Focker	PSP	
2009	Macross Ultimate Frontier	Roy Focker	PSP	
2010	Another Century's Episode: R	Roy Focker	PS3	
2011	Macross Triangle Frontier	Roy Focker	PSP	
2019	Jump Force	Ryo Saeba	PC/PS4/Xbox One	
2023	Master Detective Archives: Rain Code	Number One	Nintendo Switch	
2024	Guilty Gear Strive	Paracelsus	PC/PS4/PS5/Xbox One/Xbox Series X/S	
	Space Battleship Yamato games	Saburou Kato		
	Yawara!	Kazamatsuri Shinnosuke	PC Engine	
	Raijin Pin Pon	Raiji	Arcade	

=== Live-action ===
Year	Title	Role	Type	Notes	Source
2021	Kinnikuman: The Lost Legend	TBA (voice)	TV		
2022	Sono Koe no Anata e	Himself	Film	Documentary	
2024	City Hunter		Film	Voice cameo	

=== Drama CD ===
List of voice performances in drama CDs and audio recordings
Year	Title	Role	Notes	Source
1988	The Adventures of Kosuke Kindaichi ja:金田一耕助の冒険	Kosuke Kindaich	Cassette book, 2 vols.	
1993	CD Theater Dragon Quest III	Kandata (male fighter) カンダタ（男武闘家）		
1994	CD Theater Dragon Quest V series	Papas		
	Record of Lodoss War	Ashram		
	All Purpose Cultural Cat Girl Nuku Nuku	Kyusaku Natsume		
	City Hunter	Ryo Saeba		
	Macross	Roy Focker		
	Maison Ikkoku	Shun Mitaka		
	MegaMan NT Warrior	Mega Zaurus, Narrator		
	Sangokushi DX			
	Tengai Makyou			
	Yagami-kun no Katei no Jijō	Captain Yotsukaichi		

=== Other dubbing ===
==== Live-action ====
Year	Title	Role	Dub for	Notes	Source
1983	Private School	Jim Green	Matthew Modine	1984 Fuji TV edition	
1989	Glory	Colonel Robert Gould Shaw	Matthew Broderick		
1990	Tequila Sunrise	Dale "Mac" McKussic	Mel Gibson		
1995	Bad Boys	Detective Marcus Burnett	Martin Lawrence	1999 Fuji TV edition	
1995	Fist of the North Star	Kenshiro	Gary Daniels		
1997	Face/Off	Sean Archer	John Travolta		
1997	Tomorrow Never Dies	James Bond	Pierce Brosnan		
2015	Pixels	Eddie Plant	Peter Dinklage		
2019	Nicky Larson et le Parfum de Cupidon	Monsieur Mokkori, Psychiatrist	Jarry, Gérard Jugnot		

==== Animation ====
Year	Title	Role	Notes	Source
1992	Aladdin	Iago		
1994	The Return of Jafar	Iago		
1996	Aladdin and the King of Thieves	Iago		

== Honors ==
- Anime Grand Prix: Most Popular Voice Actor of the Year (10 times): 1979–1981, 1983–1985, 1987–1990
