= Hiroshi Naka =

Japanese voice actor and narrator

- 中 博史
- Born: Hiroaki Nakamura; Ōita Prefecture, Japan
- Occupations: Actor; voice actor; narrator
- Years active: 1980–present
- Agent: Ken Production

Hiroaki Nakamura (中村 博昭, Nakamura Hiroaki), better known by the stage name of Hiroshi Naka (中 博史, Naka Hiroshi), is a Japanese actor, voice actor and narrator affiliated with Ken Production. He is originally from Ōita Prefecture.

== Filmography ==
=== Television animation ===
1988

- Mister Ajikko (1988)

1989

- Anpanman (1989) (Uncle Yagi, Uncle Shirokabu)

1993

- Mobile Suit Victory Gundam (Mutterma Sugan, Zubroch Simonev, Fubirai Goya)

1995

- El-Hazard: The Wanderers (Sir Londs)

1997

- The King of Braves GaoGaiGar (Yan Long-Li)

1998

- Cowboy Bebop (Jobim)

1999

- Arc the Lad (Gorgon)
- Zoids: Chaotic Century (Ford)

2000

- Gate Keepers (Tetsuo Ikusawa)

2001

- Baki the Grappler (Gouki Shibukawa)
- Hikaru no Go (Heihachi Shindō)
- A Little Snow Fairy Sugar (Greta's Father)
- One Piece (Monkey D. Garp)

2002

- Kirby: Right Back at Ya! (Dakonyo, Doctor Moro)
- Mirmo! (King Marumo)
- Witch Hunter Robin (Grand Inquisitor Cortion)
- Inuyasha (Wolf elder)

2003

- Full Metal Panic? Fumoffu (Fujisaki-sensei)
- F-Zero: GP Legend (Bellonngian "Draq" Draquillie)

2004

- Naruto (Enma)

2005

- Comic Party Revolution (Chief)

2006

- Honey and Clover II (Tatsuo Negishi)
- Kiba (Genim)

2007

- Clannad (Naoyuki Okazaki)

2008

- Clannad After Story (Naoyuki Okazaki)
- Persona -trinity soul- (Kubo)
- Stitch! (Mr. Maeda (ep. 19))

2011

- Deadman Wonderland (Rinichirō Hagire)

2012

- Good Luck Girl! (Kikunoshin Suwano)
- JoJo's Bizarre Adventure (Wang Chung)
- Naruto: Shippuden (Enma, Gamabunta Ep. 249+)
- Toriko (Melk The First)

2014

- Buddy Complex (Sadamichi Jyunyou, Richardson)
- Nobunaga Concerto (Asakura Kagetake)
- Garo: The Animation (Father Nicholas)

2014–present

- Haikyū!! (Ukai Sr.)

2015

- Yamada-kun and the Seven Witches (Inuzuka)
- World Trigger (Councilor Viza)
- Plastic Memories (Antonio Horizon)

2016

- Aikatsu Stars! (Eikichi Uchida (ep. 33))
- Anne Happy (Head teacher (ep. 1))

2017

- Boruto: Naruto Next Generations (Tanuki Shigaraki)
- Altair: A Record of Battles (Wan Yixin)
- Sagrada Reset (Hiroyuki Sasano)

2019

- Ascendance of a Bookworm (Gustaf)

2020

- BNA: Brand New Animal (Yūji Tachiki)

2022

- Tribe Nine (Tenshin Ōtori)

2024

- Delicious in Dungeon (Senshi)
- My Hero Academia season 7 (Yuga Aoyama's Father)
- Magilumiere Magical Girls Inc. (Nishina)

2025

- Teogonia (Polek)
- Private Tutor to the Duke's Daughter (Graham Walker)
- Night of the Living Cat (Kōji)

2026

- The Case Book of Arne (Gordon)
- Akane-banashi (Enso Sanmeitei)
- The Ghost in the Shell (Prime Minister)

2027

- Oishinbo (Kyōichi Koizumi)

=== Original net animation (ONA) ===
- Gundam: Requiem for Vengeance (2024) (Alfee "Gearhead" Zydos)

=== Original video animation (OVA) ===
- Here is Greenwood (1991) (Mitsuru's Grandfather)
- Mega Man: Upon a Star (1993) (Dr. Light)
- Final Fantasy: Legend of the Crystals (1994) (Gush)
- El-Hazard: The Magnificent World (1995) (Roll Londs)
- Magical Girl Pretty Sammy (1995) (Sam)
- The King of Braves GaoGaiGar Final (2000) (Yan Long-Li)
- Hellsing Ultimate (2006) (Doc)
- Mobile Suit Gundam: The Origin (2015–16) (Johann Ibrahim Revil)

=== Anime films ===
- Doraemon: Nobita's Three Visionary Swordsmen (1994) (A soldier)
- Cowboy Bebop: The Movie (2001) (Jobim)
- Origin: Spirits of the Past (2006) (Oyakata)
- Naruto the Movie: Blood Prison (2011) (Gamabunta)
- A Letter to Momo (2012) (Yota's father)
- The Deer King (2021)
- Mobile Suit Gundam: Cucuruz Doan's Island (2022) (Johann Ibrahim Revil)
- Detective Conan: The Million Dollar Pentagram (2024) (Takuzō Onoe)
- Shinran: The Purpose of Life (2025) (Hōnen)

=== Video games ===
- Jak II (2003) (Kor)
- Tales of the Abyss (2005) (Spinoza)
- JoJo's Bizarre Adventure: All-Star Battle (2013) (Wang Chung)
- Breath of Fire 6 (2016) (Jubei)
- The Legend of Zelda: Breath of the Wild (2017) (King Rhoam)
- Fire Emblem Echoes: Shadows of Valentia (2017) (Mycen)
- Samurai Shodown (2019) (Jubei Yagyu/Kuroko/System Voice/Announcer)

=== Tokusatsu ===
- Kamen Rider Drive (2014) (Bat-Type Roidmude 033/Scooper Roidmude (ep. 7 - 8))
- Doubutsu Sentai Zyuohger (2016) (Hantajii (ep. 14 - 15))
- Kamen Rider Heisei Generations: Dr. Pac-Man vs. Ex-Aid & Ghost with Legend Riders (2016) (HatenaBugster)

=== Dubbing ===
==== Live-action ====
- Robert Picardo
  - Star Trek: Deep Space Nine (Dr. Lewis Zimmerman)
  - Star Trek: Voyager (The Doctor)
  - Star Trek: First Contact (Emergency Medical Hologram )
  - Supernatural (Wayne Whittaker)
  - Chuck (Dr. Howard Busgang)
- Robert Brown
  - Octopussy (2006 DVD edition) (M)
  - A View to a Kill (2006 DVD edition) (M)
  - The Living Daylights (2006 DVD edition) (M)
  - Licence to Kill (2006 DVD edition) (M)
- Anger Management (Chuck (John Turturro))
- Apollo 13 (Seymour Liebergot (Clint Howard))
- Beverly Hills Cop (Netflix edition) (Lieutenant Andrew Bogomil (Ronny Cox))
- Beverly Hills Cop II (Netflix edition) (Lieutenant Andrew Bogomil (Ronny Cox))
- The Box (Dick Burns (Holmes Osborne))
- Caravan of Courage: An Ewok Adventure (Deej)
- Cinderella (King Rowan (Pierce Brosnan))
- Disobedience (Rav Krushka (Anton Lesser))
- Donnie Brasco (Bruno)
- Drop Zone (1998 TV Asahi edition) (Bobby (Rex Linn))
- Everest (John Taske (Tim Dantay))
- The Fourth Kind (Abel Campos (Elias Koteas))
- Grey's Anatomy (Dr. Richard Webber (James Pickens Jr.))
- The Gunman (Cox (Mark Rylance))
- Hancock (Executive (Michael Mann))
- Hansel & Gretel: Witch Hunters (Sheriff Berringer (Peter Stormare))
- Hercules (Cotys (John Hurt))
- In Dreams (Doctor Silverman (Stephen Rea))
- Indiana Jones and the Kingdom of the Crystal Skull (Harold 'Ox' Oxley (John Hurt))
- Kingdom of Heaven (Raynald of Châtillon (Brendan Gleeson))
- King's War (Fan Zeng (Sun Haiying))
- The Last Boy Scout (Big Ray Walston (Tony Longo))
- Léon: The Professional (1996 TV Asahi edition) (Mathilda's Father (Michael Badalucco))
- Licence to Kill (1996 TBS edition) (Montelongo (Claudio Brook))
- Man of Steel (Dr. Emil Hamilton (Richard Schiff))
- Meteor Storm (Brock (Kevin McNulty))
- Million Dollar Arm (Ray Poitevint (Alan Arkin))
- Mission: Impossible (2003 TV Asahi edition) (Frank Barnes (Dale Dye))
- Mission: Impossible 2 (Senor De L'Arena)
- The Ninth Gate (Bernie Ornstein (James Russo))
- Notting Hill (Martin (James Dreyfus))
- October Sky (Leon Bolden (Randy Stripling))
- The Pale Horse (Inspector Stanley Lejeune (Sean Pertwee))
- The People v. O. J. Simpson: American Crime Story (Johnnie Cochran (Courtney B. Vance))
- Platoon (1998 DVD edition) (King (Keith David))
- Platoon (2003 TV Tokyo edition) (Big Harold (Forest Whitaker))
- Pokémon Detective Pikachu (Howard Clifford (Bill Nighy))
- The Poseidon Adventure (2016 BS-TBS edition) (Manny Rosen (Jack Albertson))
- Resident Evil: Extinction (2010 TV Asahi edition) (Albert Wesker (Jason O'Mara))
- Rules Don't Apply (Noah Dietrich (Martin Sheen))
- Shaft (John Shaft Sr. (Richard Roundtree))
- Snatch (Darren (Jason Flemyng))
- Three Kings (Conrad Vig (Spike Jonze))
- Tomb Raider (Mr. Yaffe (Derek Jacobi))
- Tomorrow Never Dies (Dr. Dave Greenwalt (Colin Stinton), General Bukharin (Terence Rigby))
- Valkyrie (Friedrich Olbricht (Bill Nighy))
- The Virgin Suicides (Father Moody (Scott Glenn))
- Who Framed Roger Rabbit (Wheezy, Big Bad Wolf)
- The Wraith (1992 TV Asahi edition) (Rughead (Clint Howard))
- The Young and Prodigious T.S. Spivet (Two Clouds (Dominique Pinon))

==== Animation ====
- Batman: The Brave and the Bold (Professor Milo)

==== Video games ====
- Spider-Man 2 (Doctor Octopus)
