= Naoya Uchida =

Japanese actor (born 1953)

- 内田 直哉
- Born: May 1, 1953 (age 73); Tokyo, Japan
- Occupations: Actor; voice actor
- Years active: 1972–present
- Agent: Office Osawa
- Spouse: Misao Arauchi

Naoya Uchida (内田 直哉, Uchida Naoya; born May 1, 1953) is a Japanese actor and voice actor from Tokyo, Japan. He has played several minor roles of authority in various television dramas. He debuted in 1972 in the NHK program Maboroshi no Satsui (幻の殺意, Maboroshi no Satsui), and continued acting in theater and television dramas until the late 1990s. Since then, he has refocused his career on vocal performances such as opera and dubbing. He is best known for his roles as Tatsuya Midorikawa/DenjiGreen in Denshi Sentai Denjiman, Madara Uchiha in Naruto, Azazel/The Yellow-Eyed Demon in both Supernatural and its anime adaptation, and Askeladd in Vinland Saga. He is also the Japanese voice for Bruce Willis, Woody Harrelson, Kenneth Branagh and Andy García.

== Filmography ==
=== Live-action films ===
- Kami Voice (2011) (Tanba)

=== Live-action television ===
- Kusa Moeru (1979) (Nitta Rokurō)
- Monkey (1979) (Kousei)
- Shishi no Jidai (1980)
- Takeda Shingen (1988) (Sakuma Nobumori)
- Moeyo Ken (1990) (Rokusha Sōhaku)
- Ōoka Echizen (1990) (Tomojirō)
- Ōedo Sōsamō (1992)
- Edo o Kiru (1994) (Risuke)
- Shōgun no Onmitsu! Kage Jūhachi (1996)

=== Tokusatsu ===
- Battle Fever J (1979) (Mitsuru Okiyama (Actor))
- Denshi Sentai Denjiman (1980) (Tatsuya Midorikawa (Actor)/DenziGreen (Voice))
- Engine Sentai Go-onger: Boom Boom! Bang Bang! GekijōBang!! (2008) (Raiken)
- Engine Sentai Go-onger (2008) (Rairaiken (Ep. 39 & 40))
- Uchu Sentai Kyuranger (2017) (Kukuruger (Eps. 25, 28 - 30, 32 - 34, 36 & 37)/Akyachuuga (Voiced by Arisa Komiya, Hiroshi Tsuchida) (Ep. 42))

=== Theater ===
- Sweet Charity (1983)
- My Fair Lady (1984)
- Les Misérables (1987–91) (Enjolras)
- Sakura Wars series (2005–12) (Michael Sunnyside)

=== Animated series ===
- Devil Lady (1998) (Tatsuya Yuasa)
- Monster Rancher (1999) (Golem)
- Noir (2001) (Hammond boss of Atlaid)
- Please Teacher! (2002) (Minoru Edajima)
- Witch Hunter Robin (2002) (Hiroshi Tōdō)
- One Piece (2003–present) (Doc Q)
- Monster (2004) (Gaitel)
- The Third (2005) (Leon)
- My-HiME (2004) (John Smith)
- My-Otome (2005) (John Smith)
- Akagi (2005) (Kurosaki)
- Black Lagoon (2006) (Luak)
- Death Note (2006) (Soichiro Yagami)
- Yu-Gi-Oh! GX (2006) (Sommelier Parker)
- Dinosaur King (2007) (Dr. Spike Taylor)
- Kaiji (2007) (Yūji Endō)
- Naruto: Shippuden (2009-2016) (Madara Uchiha)
- Cobra the Animation (2010) (Cobra)
- Sound of the Sky (2010) (Hopkins)
- Gyakkyō Burai Kaiji: Hakairoku-hen (2011) (Yūji Endō)
- Supernatural: The Anime Series (2011) (Azazel)
- Hunter × Hunter (2012) (Nobunaga Hazama)
- Lupin the Third: The Woman Called Fujiko Mine (2012) (Macarone)
- Fafner in the Azure: -EXODUS- (2015) (Dudley Burns)
- Drifters (2016) (Oda Nobunaga)
- Dororo (2019) (Daigo Kagemitsu)
- Vinland Saga (2019) (Askeladd)
- Moriarty the Patriot (2021) (Jack Renfield)
- Getter Robo Arc (2021) (Jin Hayato)
- In/Spectre 2nd Season (2023) (Susumu Otonashi)
- Zom 100: Bucket List of the Dead (2023) (Shizuka's father)
- Bartender: Glass of God (2024) (Ryūchi Kuzuhara)
- Übel Blatt (2025) (Batterygrave Barestar)
- A Wild Last Boss Appeared! (2025) (Aigokeros)
- Solo Leveling (2025) (Shigeo Matsumoto)
- Dandadan (2025) (Vanben)
- The Banished Court Magician Aims to Become the Strongest (2025) (Leviel Stantz)
- Hikuidori (2026) (Rokuemon Hōjō)
- Baki (2026) (Musashi Miyamoto)

=== Original video animation (OVA) ===
- To-y (1987) (Yōji Aikawa)
- Getter Robo Armageddon (1998) (Hayato Jin)
- Shin Getter Robo vs Neo Getter Robo (2000) (Hayato Jin)
- Naruto: Mission: Protect the Waterfall Village! (2004) (Suien)
- New Getter Robo (2004) (Hayato Jin)
- Demon Prince Enma (2006) (Heinrich)
- Mobile Suit Gundam Unicorn (2010) (Otto Mitas)
- Mobile Suit Gundam: The Witch from Mercury Prologue (2022) (Delling Rembran)
- Cyberpunk: Edgerunners 2 (2026) (Richard)

=== Animated films ===
- Case Closed: Captured in Her Eyes (2000) (Tamotsu Jin'no)
- Psychic School Wars (2012) (Kenji's grandfather)
- Road to Ninja: Naruto the Movie (2012) (Tobi)
- Hunter × Hunter: Phantom Rouge (2013) (Nobunaga Hazama)

=== Video games ===
- Ratchet: Deadlocked (xxxx) (Ace Hardlight)
- Sakura Wars: So Long, My Love (xxxx) (Michael Sunnyside)
- Naruto: Ultimate Ninja series (xxxx) (Obito Uchiha/Tobi, Madara Uchiha)
- Kingdom Hearts Birth by Sleep (2010) (Captain Hook)
- JoJo's Bizarre Adventure: All Star Battle (2013) (Cioccolata)
- JoJo's Bizarre Adventure: Eyes of Heaven (2015) (Cioccolata)
- Eve: Ghost Enemies (2022) (Saburou Kouno)
- Tactics Ogre: Reborn (2022) (Xaebos Ronsenbach)

=== Live-action dubbing ===
- Bruce Willis
  - Armageddon (2004 NTV edition) (Harry Stamper)
  - The Sixth Sense (2003 NTV edition) (Dr. Malcolm Crowe)
  - Bandits (2005 NTV edition) (Joe Blake)
  - Tears of the Sun (Lieutenant A.K. Waters)
  - Ocean's Twelve (2007 NTV edition) (Bruce Willis)
  - 16 Blocks (Det. Jack Mosley)
  - Lucky Number Slevin (Mr. Goodkat)
  - Perfect Stranger (Harrison Hill)
  - Planet Terror (Lt. Muldoon)
  - Cop Out (Jimmy Monroe)
  - Vice (Julian Michaels)
  - Rock the Kasbah (Bombay Brian)
  - Marauders (Jeffrey Hubert)
  - Once Upon a Time in Venice (Steve Ford)
  - First Kill (Police Chief Marvin Howell)
  - Acts of Violence (Detective James Avery)
  - Death Wish (Dr. Paul Kersey)
  - Air Strike (Jack)
  - Survive the Night (Frank Clark)
  - Hard Kill (Donovan Chalmers)
  - Apex (Thomas Malone)
- Woody Harrelson
  - Friends with Benefits (Tommy)
  - Now You See Me (Merritt McKinney)
  - Out of the Furnace (Harlan DeGroat)
  - Triple 9 (Sergeant Detective Jeffrey Allen)
  - Now You See Me 2 (Merritt McKinney/Chase McKinney)
  - LBJ (Lyndon B. Johnson)
  - Shock and Awe (Jonathan Landay)
  - Venom (Cletus Kasady)
  - The Highwaymen (Maney Gault)
  - Midway (Chester W. Nimitz)
  - Venom: Let There Be Carnage (Cletus Kasady)
  - Kate (Varrick)
  - The Man from Toronto (The Man from Toronto)
  - Fly Me to the Moon (Moe Berkus)
- Andy García
  - Ocean's Eleven (Terry Benedict)
  - Ocean's Twelve (Terry Benedict)
  - Ocean's Thirteen (Terry Benedict)
  - The Pink Panther 2 (Vicenzo Brancaleone)
  - True Memoirs of an International Assassin (Netflix edition) (El Toro)
  - Geostorm (U.S. President Andrew Palma)
  - Expend4bles (Marsh)
  - Now You See Me: Now You Don't (Merritt McKinney)
- Kevin Costner
  - Swing Vote (Bud Johnson)
  - Batman v Superman: Dawn of Justice (Jonathan Kent)
  - Criminal (Jerico Stewart)
  - Molly's Game (Larry Bloom)
  - Zack Snyder's Justice League (Jonathan Kent)
- David Morse
  - The Rock (1999 NTV edition) (Major Tom Baxter)
  - Contact (2001 TV Tokyo edition) (Theodore Arroway)
  - Dancer in the Dark (Bill Houston)
  - Disturbia (Robert "Rob" Turner)
- Greg Kinnear
  - Someone like You (Ray Brown)
  - Bad News Bears (Roy Bullock)
  - Fast Food Nation (Don Anderson)
  - Little Miss Sunshine (Richard Hoover)
- Rhys Ifans
  - The Amazing Spider-Man (Dr. Curt Connors/The Lizard)
  - Spider-Man: No Way Home (Dr. Curt Connors/The Lizard)
  - Venom: The Last Dance (Martin Moon)
- 12 Angry Men (2003 NHK edition) (Juror #12 (William Petersen))
- 15 Minutes (Emil Solvák (Karel Roden))
- 300 (Theron (Dominic West))
- About Schmidt (Randall Hertzel (Dermot Mulroney))
- The Adventures of Pluto Nash (Anthony Frankowski / Tony Francis (Jay Mohr))
- All About Steve (Hartman Hughes (Thomas Haden Church))
- All the King's Men (Willie Stark (Sean Penn))
- Amélie (Joseph (Dominique Pinon))
- American Graffiti (2011 Blu-Ray edition) (Bob Falfa (Harrison Ford))
- Another Earth (John Burroughs (William Mapother))
- Argo (Jack O'Donnell (Bryan Cranston))
- Arrow (Quentin Lance (Paul Blackthorne))
- Ballistic: Ecks vs. Sever (2009 TV Asahi edition) (Robert Gant Clark (Gregg Henry))
- Band of Brothers (First Lieutenant Harry Welsh (Rick Warden))
- The Bank Job (MI5's Tim Everett (Richard Lintern))
- Barbie (CEO of Mattel (Will Ferrell))
- The Big C (Sean Tolkey (John Benjamin Hickey)
- Big Eyes (Walter Keane (Christoph Waltz))
- Black Rain (Nick Conklin (Michael Douglas))
- The Cabin in the Woods (Steve Hadley (Bradley Whitford))
- Changeling (J.J. Jones (Jeffrey Donovan))
- Charlie and the Chocolate Factory (2008 NTV edition) (Mr. Salt (James Fox))
- Children of Men (Nigel (Danny Huston))
- Cinderella Man (Max Baer (Craig Bierko))
- Cirque du Freak: The Vampire's Assistant (Larten Crepsley (John C. Reilly))
- Cliffhanger (2014 BS Japan edition) (Hal Tucker (Michael Rooker))
- D-Tox (Frank Slater (Christopher Fulford))
- Dark Blue World (Machatý (Oldřich Kaiser))
- The Dark Knight (2012 TV Asahi edition) (Mike Engel (Anthony Michael Hall))
- Day of the Dead (2020 Blu-ray edition) (John (Terry Alexander))
- Doctor Who (Twelfth Doctor (Peter Capaldi))
- The Dog Stars (Bangley (Josh Brolin))
- Dr. Dolittle 2 (Archie the Bear (Steve Zahn))
- ER (Robert Romano (Paul McCrane))
- Exit Wounds (2004 NTV edition) (Matt Montini (David Vadim))
- Far from the Madding Crowd (William Boldwood (Michael Sheen))
- The Fast and the Furious (Dominic Toretto (Vin Diesel))
- Final Approach (Greg Gilliad (Anthony Michael Hall))
- Final Destination (Ken Browning (Robert Wisden))
- Frost/Nixon (David Frost (Michael Sheen))
- Ghosts of Mars (Nathan Jericho (Jason Statham))
- The Godfather (2001 DVD edition) (Carlo Rizzi (Gianni Russo))
- The Godfather (2008 Blu-Ray edition) (Johnny Fontane (Al Martino))
- Hard Target 2 (Aldrich (Robert Knepper))
- Harry Potter and the Chamber of Secrets (Gilderoy Lockhart (Kenneth Branagh))
- High School Musical (Jack Bolton (Bart Johnson))
- Holmes & Watson (Sherlock Holmes (Will Ferrell))
- The Hunger Games: The Ballad of Songbirds & Snakes (Casca Highbottom (Peter Dinklage))
- Indiana Jones and the Temple of Doom (2009 WOWOW edition) (Indiana Jones (Harrison Ford))
- Indiana Jones and the Last Crusade (2009 WOWOW edition) (Indiana Jones (Harrison Ford))
- Indiana Jones and the Kingdom of the Crystal Skull (Indiana Jones (Harrison Ford))
- The Italian Job (Handsome Rob (Jason Statham))
- Jack the Giant Slayer (Lord Roderick (Stanley Tucci))
- Jay and Silent Bob Strike Back (Brodie Bruce / Banky Edwards (Jason Lee))
- Kick-Ass (Damon MacReady / Big Daddy (Nicolas Cage))
- Killing Me Softly (Jake (Jason Hughes))
- A Knight's Tale (Count Adhemar (Rufus Sewell))
- Knives Out (Walter Thrombey (Michael Shannon))
- The Lady in the Van (Alan Bennett (Alex Jennings))
- The Living Daylights (2006 DVD edition) (General Georgi Koskov (Jeroen Krabbé))
- Lockout (Harry Shaw (Lennie James))
- Malcolm in the Middle (Hal Wilkerson (Bryan Cranston))
- Manchester by the Sea (Joseph "Joe" Chandler (Kyle Chandler))
- Max (Karl Mayr (Ulrich Thomsen))
- Megalopolis (Franklyn Cicero (Giancarlo Esposito))
- Mesrine (Jacques Mesrine (Vincent Cassel))
- Miss Sloane (Rodolfo Schmidt (Mark Strong))
- Mr. & Mrs. Smith (2008 NTV edition) (Eddie (Vince Vaughn))
- National Security (Detective Frank McDuff (Colm Feore))
- NCIS: New Orleans (Dwayne Cassius "King" Pride (Scott Bakula))
- Next (Mr. Smith (Thomas Kretschmann))
- Nightmare Alley (Clement "Clem" Hoatley (Willem Dafoe))
- One Hour Photo (Bill Owens (Gary Cole))
- Painkiller Jane (Andre McBride (Rob Stewart))
- Pan (Blackbeard (Hugh Jackman))
- Patrick Melrose (David Melrose (Hugo Weaving))
- Pearl Harbor (Mr. Walker (William Fichtner))
- Phone Booth (Stuart "Stu" Shepard (Colin Farrell))
- Platoon (2003 TV Tokyo edition) (Sergeant O'Neill (John C. McGinley))
- The Rock (2000 TV Asahi edition) (Commander Charles Anderson (Michael Biehn), Lonner (Xander Berkeley))
- Roots (Tom Lea (Jonathan Rhys Meyers))
- The Running Man (Dan Killian (Josh Brolin))
- The Sandlot: Heading Home (Tommy "Santa" Santorelli (Luke Perry))
- Shazam! (Mr. Sivana (John Glover))
- Skyfall (Raoul Silva (Javier Bardem))
- Slither (Jack MacReady (Gregg Henry))
- Smash (Derek Wills (Jack Davenport))
- Star Trek: Enterprise (Charles "Trip" Tucker III (Connor Trinneer))
- Supernatural (Azazel (Fredric Lehne))
- The Tailor of Panama (Mickie Abraxas (Brendan Gleeson))
- Tenet (Andrei Sator (Kenneth Branagh))
- The Terminator (2003 TV Tokyo edition) (Vukovich (Lance Henriksen))
- Three Billboards Outside Ebbing, Missouri (James (Peter Dinklage))
- Tokyo Trial (Bert Röling (Marcel Hensema))
- Train to Busan (Yon-suk (Kim Eui-sung))
- Trance (Franck (Vincent Cassel))
- Troy (2007 TV Asahi edition) (Hector (Eric Bana))
- Valkyrie (Henning von Tresckow (Kenneth Branagh))
- Vertical Limit (Elliot Vaughn (Bill Paxton))
- A Very English Scandal (Peter Bessell (Alex Jennings))
- Virus (Steve Baker (William Baldwin))
- Walk Hard: The Dewey Cox Story (Pa Cox (Raymond J. Barry))
- Walk the Line (Ray Cash (Robert Patrick))
- Watchmen (Judd Crawford (Don Johnson))
- We Are Marshall (Jack Lengyel (Matthew McConaughey))
- Windtalkers (Gunnery Sergeant Richard Hjelmsted (Peter Stormare))
- Woman on Top (Monica Jones (Harold Perrineau))
- Zero Dark Thirty (George (Mark Strong))
- Zeroville (Rondell (Will Ferrell))
- Blindspot (Robert Borden (Ukweli Roach)) (Demanding Minoru Uchida)

=== Animation dubbing ===
- The Adventures of Ichabod and Mr. Toad (Mr. Toad)
- Brave (Lord Dingwall)
- Cars (Chick Hicks)
- Cars 3 (Chick Hicks)
- Castlevania (Dracula)
- House of Mouse (Captain Hook, Gaston, Mr. Toad)
- Ice Age: Continental Drift (Captain Gutt)
- Jake and the Never Land Pirates (Captain Hook)
- House of Villains (Captain Hook)
- Monsters vs. Aliens (Dr. Cockroach)
- Peter Pan (Captain Hook) ※World Masterpiece Edition
- The Pirate Fairy (James Hook)
- Playmobil: The Movie (Viking Leader)
- Rango (Elgin)
- Return to Never Land (Captain Hook)
- Rio (Nigel)
- Rio 2 (Nigel)
- The Road to El Dorado (Tulio)
- Robots (Ratchet)
- Star Wars: The Clone Wars (Nuvo Vindi)
- Spies in Disguise (Killian)
