= New Getter Robo =

Japanese original video animation series

- Japanese DVD cover art of the first volume

新ゲッターロボ (Shin Gettā Robo)
- Genre: Mecha
- Created by: Ken Ishikawa; Go Nagai
- Original video animation
- Directed by: Jun Kawagoe
- Produced by: Koji Morimoto; Satsuki Mizuno; Yasu Tokuhara
- Written by: Shinsuke Onishi
- Music by: Kazuo Nobuta; Try Force
- Studio: Brain's Base; Bee Media
- Licensed by: AUS: Tokyo Night Train Madman Entertainment; NA: Discotek Media
- Released: April 9, 2004 – September 10, 2004
- Episodes: 13

New Getter Robo (新ゲッターロボ, Shin Gettā Robo) is an anime original video animation co-produced by Dynamic Planning and Bandai Visual. The series is a re-imagining of the 1970s manga Getter Robo, created by Go Nagai and Ken Ishikawa, that incorporates aspects of Japanese mythology like the Oni and Abe no Seimei which replaces the Dinosaur and Hyakki Empire present in the original Getter Robo manga.

== Plot ==
A reimagination of the Getter Robo story, it begins with Dr. Saotome, who seeks extraordinary men to pilot his invention: The Getter Robo. Many who have tried to pilot it have died, and his son, Tatsuhito, was seriously injured during a Getter battle. He finds three men to pilot the Getter Robo: Ryoma Nagare, Hayato Jin, and Benkei Musashibo. Now they must battle and destroy the Oni, mysterious creatures that appeared suddenly which happen to resemble mythological monsters.

== Characters ==
- Ryoma Nagare (流竜馬, Nagare Ryōma): The team leader. Strong, and trained in martial arts in his father's footsteps, Ryoma is a powerful martial artist which allows him to effectively pilot the demanding Getter machine. Pilots the Eagle Machine and Getter-1.

Voiced by: Hideo Ishikawa (Japanese); Lex Lang (English)

- Hayato Jin (神隼人, Jin Hayato): Both a terrorist and a genius, Hayato starts out as an insane and psychopathic terrorist leader. Upon joining the Getter team, Hayato's demeanour switches to a more serious but still cold attitude, wanting to learn more about the origins of Getter energy. Pilots the Jaguar Machine and Getter-2.

Voiced by: Naoya Uchida (Japanese); Kirk Thornton (English)

- Benkei Musashibo (武蔵坊弁慶, Musashibō Benkei): A warrior monk named after the legendary Japanese hero of the same name in addition to Musashi Tomoe and Benkei Kuruma. Benkei Musashibo shares traits of both Musashi Tomoe and Benkei Kurama from the original Getter Robo, including their trademark Daisetsuzan Oroshi (大雪山おろし) attack. Pilots the Bear Machine and Getter-3.

Voiced by: Kiyoyuki Yanada (Japanese); Michael McConnohie (English)

- Professor Saotome (早乙女博士, Saotome hakase): Inventor of the Getter Robo. Also pilots the Bear Machine during the second and third episodes, up until Benkei is recruited.

Voiced by: Kinryū Arimoto (Japanese); Tom Wyner (English)

- Michiru Saotome (早乙女ミチル, Saotome Michiru): Professor Saotome's daughter. She is more interested in studying the Oni than fighting them. Unlike her appearances in the manga and flashbacks in Getter Robo: Armageddon, this version of Michiru is notably a lot colder and tougher.

Voiced by: Takako Honda (Japanese); Wendee Lee (English)

- Seimei Abe (安倍晴明, Abeno Seimei): Seimei Abe is the villain of the series. He is responsible for bringing the Oni to attack the world.

Voiced by: Takehito Koyasu (Japanese); Kim Strauss (English)

- Man In Black
- Tatshuito Saotome, Master Carlos
- Ruby, Lab Staff
- Lab Staff
- Bonze
- Kirk Thonton
- Additional Voices
- Jamieson Price
- Wendee Lee
- Lex Lang
- Tom Wyner
- Villager
- Hiruda, Soldier
- Debt Collector

=== Four Heavenly Kings ===
The Four Heavenly Kings are revealed in episode 11 as the primary antagonists of the series that used Abe no Seimei to destroy Getter Robo.

- Tamonten (多聞天, Tamonten): The "leader" of the four, attacks with lightning bolts and can grow in size.

Voiced by: Tessho Genda (Japanese); Jamieson Price (English)

- Jikokuten (持国天, Jikokuten): Attacks with a sword.

Voiced by: Banjou Ginga (Japanese); Dan Woren (English)

- Zochoten (増長天, Zōchōten): Attacks with a large serpent on his body.

Voiced by: Yuusaku Yara (Japanese); Paul St. Peter (English)

- Komokuten (広目天, Kōmokuten): Attacks with scrolls with quickly written incantations.

Voiced by: Daisuke Gouri (Japanese); Richard Epcar (English)

== Episodes ==
No.	Title	Original release date
1	"There Goes Ryoma"; Transliteration: "Ryōma ga Iku" (Japanese: 竜馬が行く)	April 9, 2004
2	"Hayato is Coming"; Transliteration: "Hayato ga Mairu" (Japanese: 隼人が来る)	April 9, 2004
3	"Benkei Musashibo"; Transliteration: "Musashibō Benkei" (Japanese: 武蔵坊弁慶)	May 14, 2004
4	"Three Animals Go!"; Transliteration: "Sanki ga Iku" (Japanese: 三匹が行く)	May 14, 2004
5	"Oni Fire"; Transliteration: "Onibi" (Japanese: 鬼火)	June 11, 2004
6	"The Mansion Where The Oni Dwell"; Transliteration: "Oni no Sumukan" (Japanese: 鬼の棲む館)	June 11, 2004
7	"The Ying-Yang Master"; Transliteration: "Onmyōji" (Japanese: 陰陽師)	July 9, 2004
8	"Collision"; Transliteration: "Gekitotsu" (Japanese: 激突)	July 9, 2004
9	"Hell's Upheaval"; Transliteration: "Jigokuhen" (Japanese: 地獄変)	August 13, 2004
10	"Lone Wolf"; Transliteration: "Hitori Ōkami" (Japanese: ひとり狼)	August 13, 2004
11	"Thus The Divine Wind Blows"; Transliteration: "Kakute Kamikaze ha Fuku" (Japanese: かくて神風は吹く)	September 10, 2004
12	"Heaven and Earth"; Transliteration: "Ten to Chi to" (Japanese: 天と地と)	September 10, 2004
13	"There Goes Ryoma"; Transliteration: "(Saishū hanashi) Ryōma ga Iku" (Japanese: (最終話) 竜馬がいく)	September 10, 2004
