= Shin Getter Robo vs Neo Getter Robo =

Japanese original video animation series

- Japanese DVD cover art of the first volume

真ゲッターロボ対ネオゲッターロボ
- Genre: Mecha
- Created by: Ken Ishikawa; Go Nagai
- Original video animation
- Directed by: Jun Kawagoe
- Written by: Shinzo Fujita
- Music by: Kazuo Nobuta
- Studio: Brain's Base; Bee Media
- Licensed by: NA: Discotek Media
- Released: December 21, 2000 – June 25, 2001
- Episodes: 4

Shin Getter Robo vs Neo Getter Robo (真ゲッターロボ対ネオゲッターロボ, Shin Gettā Robo tai Neo Gettā Robo) is an anime OVA series based on the works of Go Nagai and Ken Ishikawa. It was released in four episodes on four DVDs ranging from December 2000 to June 2001.

Shin Getter Robo vs Neo Getter Robo draws heavily from Ken Ishikawa's manga Getter Robo Go. An anime adaptation of Getter Robo Go was made in 1991 but has no relation to Ishikawa's manga aside from sharing the titular robot and pilots (who were very different in their personalities and backgrounds). Neo Getter Robo features much more faithful versions of Ishikawa's characters, but with a new plot and new Getter.

Discotek Media announced the North American license to the anime on March 13, 2012, and plans on releasing the series to DVD and Blu-ray.

== Story ==
Neo Getter Robo is an alternate universe sequel to the original Getter Robo, in which the primary enemies were the Dinosaur Empire, the descendants of the few dinosaurs who survived extinction and hid deep below the Earth's surface, evolving into more humanoid forms. The prologue in the first episode shows a massive Dinosaur invasion of New York City. As Professor Saotome and Hayato rush to activate Shin Getter Robo, Musashi uses the original Getter to hold off the Dinosaurs. When it becomes clear that he cannot stop them under his own power, Musashi crushes the Getter Core, causing an explosion that wipes out almost all of the Dinosaurs, as well as all of Manhattan Island. Responding to the international outcry, the Japanese government banned Getter Energy research and took over Saotome Laboratories, subsidizing it as a self-defense branch called NISAR. Five years later, the Dinosaurs begin to rise again and Hayato, now a member of NISAR, begins recruiting a new Getter team.

== Characters ==
=== NISAR ===
Gou Ichimonji Voiced by Takahiro Sakurai- A 17-year-old orphan and the pilot of Neo Getter-1. He lost his family during the first Dinosaur invasion. He became an underground pit fighter to support himself. One day, a Dinosaur attacked him, and he was saved by Hayato, who wanted him to join the Getter team.

Shou Tachibana Voiced by Yū Asakawa- The pilot of Neo Getter-2. She has a highly analytical mind and tends to put more thought and strategy into her actions than her teammates. She is also a highly accomplished practitioner of kendo.

Gai Daidou Voiced by Toshiharu Sakurai- Gai is the pilot of Neo Getter-3. He tends to take most of the oddities of the Getter team in stride, trying to help Gou through them. He loves food, which is the reason for his portly figure.

Hayato Jin Voiced by Naoya Uchida- The former pilot of Getter-2 and current commander of NISAR's operations. Hayato is smart, savvy, and ruthless; he knows exactly how to handle the members of his team. An old wound prevents him from piloting. He is typically flanked by a pair of assistants, one of whom looks like an older Shou (with a gray streak in her hair) and a large, powerfully-built man.

Professor Shikishima Voiced by Jōji Yanami- This creepy, odd-looking scientist has a large, bent screw sticking out of his head. He builds new weapons and technology for Neo Getter Robo, though their reliability is questionable.

=== Getter Team Allies ===
Jack King Voiced by Tamotsu Nishiwaki- Jack is the pilot of the US Super Robot, Texas Mack. He is proud, confident, and very patriotic, developing a friendly rivalry with Gou as they assist each other in different crises. Jack's Japanese is fairly poor, with strange emphasis, a heavy Texan accent, and a tendency to switch back to English mid-sentence.

Mary King Voiced by Chieko Atarashi- Jack's younger sister, she pilots Texas Mack's Hat Machine. Mary tends to be more polite and speaks much better Japanese (though still with a heavy Texan accent and strange emphasis). She and Shou are good friends. Mary handles the more technical operations for Texas Mack, allowing Jack to focus on fighting.

Professor Saotome Voiced by Kōsei Tomita- The discoverer of Getter Energy and creator of Getter Robo. After the Japanese government took over the Getter project, he was confined to his laboratory, where he spends his days further examining his old designs and keeping watch over Shin Getter Robo.

Ryoma Nagare Voiced by Hideo Ishikawa - The former pilot of Getter-1 and a master martial artist. Unlike the main Getter anime continuity, Ryoma was captured by the Dinosaurs and horribly tortured, which left him with severe physical and mental scars during the battle of New York. He left the Getter project after Musashi's death, but returned to help Saotome when the Dinosaurs attempted to destroy Shin Getter Robo.

Musashi Tomoe Voiced by Kiyoyuki Yanada- The late pilot of Getter-3, Musashi only appears in the first five minutes of the series. Piloting the original Getter Robo by himself to buy time for the activation of Shin Getter Robo, he fights the Dinosaurs in New York City. Ultimately overwhelmed by the sheer number of enemies, Musashi sacrifices himself and the Getter by crushing its power core, releasing waves of Getter Energy that destroy most of the Dinosaurs - along with most of New York City. Musashi dies in practically all of his appearances in the Getter saga, which has earned him the nickname "Kenny". Go Nagai has joked that he enjoys devising new ways to kill Musashi in each series.

Michiru Saotome and Benkei Kuruma - Two characters from previous Getter sagas, they make cameo appearances in the ending of Neo Getter's final episode. Michiru is Professor Saotome's daughter, who aided the Getter team by piloting the ship Lady Command. Benkei appeared in Getter Robo G as a little league coach who was recruited to replace Musashi as the third Getter pilot.

=== Dinosaur Empire ===
Emperor Gol Voiced by Kenji Utsumi- The supreme leader of the Dinosaur Empire, Gol believes that humans wrongfully usurped the dinosaurs' place as the rulers of Earth when they were forced underground millions of years ago. He was almost completely destroyed when Musashi destroyed his Getter Core, but his minions spent the past five years rebuilding him as a cyborg with technology taken from an alien ship buried in Antarctica.

General Bat Voiced by Norio Wakamoto- The commander of the Dinosaur Empire's military forces. His most distinctive feature is the fact that his head is vaguely shaped like a bat (hence his name). Though he typically oversees military operations from a distance, he personally leads the attack on Saotome Labs in episode 3, hoping to destroy Shin Getter Robo.

Advisor Gallery Voiced by Mahito Tsujimura- The Dinosaur Empire's chief scientist, Gallery is in charge of the construction of the Mechasauruses. Much of his body consists of cybernetics, and he is the one who oversaw Emperor Gol's reconstruction. In episode 4 he pilots a Mechasaurus to battle the newly activated Shin Getter Robo.

Neon Voiced by Nobuyuki Hiyama- A loyal soldier in the Dinosaur Empire's military. He appears in episode 3, piloting a stolen Prototype Getter.

== Mecha ==
=== Neo Getter Robo ===
Built by NISAR, Neo Getter was designed as the first Getter not to use Getter Energy, due to the ban on such research. Instead, Neo Getter runs on Plasma Power, which is powerful but still limited. It also differs from more traditional Getters in other ways, such as lacking a tomahawk weapon and Getter-2, but not Getter-1, being the flight-capable form. Visually, it combines aspects of both Getter Robo Go and Getter Robo G, the latter of which does not appear in this continuity.

- Neo Getter-1

The blue primary form of Neo Getter, Getter-1 is best suited to ground combat and is piloted by Gou Ichimonji. Its weapons include Chain Knuckle, similar to the traditional Rocket Punch but tethered by a long chain, and Shoulder Missile, fired from pop-up launchers on its backpack. Its strongest attack, Plasma Thunder, channels Neo Getter's Plasma Power into its hands, generating a cloud of seething energy that it throws at the enemy; however, this drains much of Neo Getter's power.

- Neo Getter-2

The pink, high-speed form of Neo Getter, Getter-2 can fly and excels at aerial combat. Its weapons include Drill Arm Guns and a Drill Arm, which can be used by a three-fingered hand that sprouts from the tip of its right drill. Its strongest attack is Plasma Sword, and like past Getter-2s, it can use its speed to evade and distract its enemies.

- Neo Getter-3

The black, super-strong form of Neo Getter, Getter-3 functions best underwater. In Tank Mode, its legs sprout treaded "feet" for faster ground movement. Its weapons include Getter Tornado and its ultimate attack Plasma Break, a bolt of Plasma lightning fired from the spikes on its back.

=== Texas Mack ===
America's Super Robot, Texas Mack is modeled on the traditional cowboy. It is capable of flight, but can extend its range by riding Pasture King, a mechanical horse piloted by Jack's pet dog. Its main weapons are a pair of revolvers and its bare fists, as well as a lasso. When the situation turns bad, Jack pulls out his "way too much high power man" cannon, which is stored in a giant coffin-shaped container. At least two such cannons exist; one is hidden in the White House lawn, while the other is in the American embassy in Japan. Additionally, Texas Mack's Hat Machine is a fighter plane which can transform into a shield.

=== Shin Getter Robo ===
The ultimate Getter, Shin Getter Robo was placed under heavy lock-down after the ban on Getter Energy research. Fearing its power, General Bat leads an attack on Saotome Labs to destroy it before it can be used, but this attack fails. In this series, Shin Getter can only be activated if the pilot has the will to use it; it wouldn't activate in the past until Ryoma sensed Musashi's death, and activated in the present because Gou feared for Shou and Gai's lives. Shin Getter most closely resembles the version from Super Robot Wars in both appearance and weapons.

- Shin Getter-1

The primary form of Shin Getter, it is capable of flight and can even burrow underground. Its main weapon is the Double Tomahawk Lancer, which can be used in melee combat or thrown. The Getter Beam fires a blast of concentrated Getter Energy, which is highly damaging to dinosaurs. This form is the most used form in Neo Getter.

- Shin Getter-2

The high-speed form of Shin Getter, it can fly briefly using its powerful engines and uses its speed to avoid enemy attacks. Its primary weapon is its giant Drill Arm, which can also be fired as the Drill Missile.

- Shin Getter-3

The high-power form of Shin Getter, it is best suited to underwater combat. Its main weapons are the Getter Missiles on its shoulders and the Missile Bomb in its rear section. Although only used briefly, Shin Getter-3 possesses the extendable arms of other versions.

- God Getter Robo

In Neo Getter, Shin Getter-1 can transform into a highly powerful form dubbed "God Getter Robo" (a play on the word Shin, meaning both "True" and "God" depending on the kanji used). This form resembles a bulky, dark blue version of Shin Getter-1 with red wings reminiscent of the original anime version of Devilman. God Getter also gains the "pupils" that are a trademark of Shin Getter in the other incarnations. In the anime, it defeats Emperor Gol in one punch; the Super Robot Wars series also gives God Getter Robo the Stoner Sunshine attack, possessed by other versions of Shin Getter Robo (Though this concession was lacking in Super Robot Wars GC).

=== Getter Robo ===
The classic Getter Robo, it appears in the prologue only. Getter-1, its primary form, flies and uses its Getter Tomahawk, Getter Wing and Getter Beam. Getter-2 uses speed as well as its Drill Arm. Getter-3 uses its strength, as well as Getter Missiles and Daisetsuzan Oroshi, a Judo throw perfected by Musashi. Traditionally, Getter-1 is piloted by Ryoma and Getter-2 by Hayato, but in Neo Getter, Musashi pilots all three forms.

=== Prototype Getters ===
Appearing in episode 3, these half-completed Getters are stolen by Dinosaur Empire soldiers and used to fight Neo Getter. They seem to be incomplete prototypes for Getter Robo and Getter Robo G, using weapons from their forms. The most prominent Prototype Getter is used by Neon and resembles a combination of Getter-1 and Getter Dragon.

=== Mechasauruses ===
Mechasauruses are the primary weapon of the Dinosaur Empire. These bio-organic mecha take the shape of various animals, typically reptiles or amphibians, and are all piloted.

- Mechasaurus Doba - The enemy in the first episode of the series, it is piloted by the Dinosaur soldier who attempted to capture Gou. Its weapons include a pair of lizards inside its head, whose tails act as whips to thwart close-range attacks. It also uses an energy beam in its head, a heat beam in its mouth, and Rocket Punches, suggesting that Doba is a parody or homage to Mazinger Z. It is destroyed by Neo Getter-1's Plasma Thunder.
- Mechasaurus Bull - Appearing in the second episode, Bull was assigned to guard the Dinosaur Empire's asteroid cannon, which was bombarding the United States. As its name implies, it resembles a bull. Its main weapon is a pair of spike-like missiles fired from its chest. It is cut in half by Neo Getter-2's Plasma Sword.
- Mechasaurus Moba - Moba was part of a two-pronged attack; while Bull attacked America, Moba was sent to destroy NESAR's main base in Japan. This gigantic turtle's primary attack was the ability to shoot fireballs from its mouth. It was overturned by Neo Getter-3, then destroyed by a Plasma Break attack.
- Mechasaurus Boar - The personal machine of General Bat, Boar appears in the third episode after the failed attempt to destroy Shin Getter Robo. Boar's only weapons are a set of extending whips in its arms, which it uses to powerful effect. Disabled by Shin Getter-1's tomahawk, Bat grapples Shin Getter in an attempt to self-destruct and take the Getter with him, but Gou blasts him away with the Getter Beam.
- Mechasaurus Gera - Advisor Gallery's machine, Gera resembles a gigantic jellyfish. It has the ability to absorb any kind of energy, even Getter Energy, and turn it into electricity for attacks. Shou figured out that it had a set limit of energy it could absorb and instructed Gai to overload it with Shin Getter-3's Getter Missile Bomb attack, causing it to explode.
- Super Emperor Gol - Technically not a Mechasaurus, this is the form Emperor Gol takes in the final chapter of the OVA to battle the heroes. By striking himself with rays from four devices atop his ship, Gol enlarges himself to roughly twice Shin Getter-1's height, gaining three large horns on his head, a small face on his stomach, and a pair of bat-like wings beneath his cape. In addition to being physically superior to Shin Getter-1 and immune to the effects of Getter Rays, Gol was armed with a powerful energy cannon in his stomach, a cybernetic left arm that could project razor-sharp tendrils or reconfigure into an electrified mace, dark energy blasts fired from his horns and sides, and a powerful tail that could extend to bind his enemies. He overwhelmed Shin Getter-1, but the Getter Team's determination transformed it into God Getter Robo, which shrugged off Gol's attacks before defeating him with a single blow.

== Episodes ==
- Change 1: Go!! Neo Getter Robo! (出撃!!ネオゲッターロボ!)

Release Date: December 21, 2000

- Change 2: Arise!! Texas Mack! (登場!!テキサスマック!)

Release Date: February 25, 2001

- Change 3: Revive!! Shin Getter Robo! (復活!!真ゲッターロボ!)

Release Date: April 25, 2001

- Final Change: Discover the Limit!! The Earth's Future! (切り拓け!!地球の未来!)

Release Date: June 25, 2001

== Music ==
Opening: Storm by JAM Project featuring Ichirou Mizuki and Hironobu Kageyama

Ending (Change 1-3): Rising by JAM Project featuring Ichirou Mizuki and Hironobu Kageyama

Ending (Final Change): Yeah Yeah Yeah! (Texas Mack's Theme) by JAM Project featuring Ichirou Mizuki and Hironobu Kageyama
