= Kumiko Takahashi (animator) =

Japanese animator and character designer

Kumiko Takahashi (高橋 久美子, Takahashi Kumiko; born February 20 in Saitama Prefecture) is a Japanese animator and character designer. She is noted for her work as a character designer and animation director on numerous anime series, such as Cardcaptor Sakura, Witch Hunter Robin and Ouran High School Host Club.

A member of the studio Sunrise, she made her debut as in-between animator with the 1982 film, Mobile Suit Gundam III: Meguriai Sora-hen, and made her key animation debut with the 1984 anime television series Giant Gorg. She won Best Animator at the 2015 Tokyo Anime Award for Fullmetal Alchemist, sharing it with two other animators.

== Works ==
- Mobile Suit Gundam III: Meguriai Uchū-hen (1982, in-between animation)
- Giant Gorg (1984, key animation)
- Sei Jūshi Bismarck (1984–1985, key animation)
- Dirty Pair (1985, key animation)
- Mobile Suit Zeta Gundam (1985–1986, key animation)
- Arion (1986, animation director assistant)
- Call Me Tonight (1986, character design and animation director)
- Gakuen Tokusō Hikaruon (1987, key animation)
- City Hunter (1987–1988, key animation and animation director)
- Sengoku Kidan Yōtōden (1987–1988, key animation)
- City Hunter 2 (1988–1989, key animation and animation director)
- City Hunter 3 (1989–1990, key animation and animation director)
- Assemble Insert (1989, key animation)
- Kaze no Na wa Amnesia (1990, key animation and animation director)
- Urusei Yatsura: Always My Darling (1991, character design and animation director)
- Tokyo Babylon (1992, character design and animation director)
- Oshare Kozō wa Hanamaru (1993, key animation)
- Jubei Ninpūcho (1993, key animation)
- Pops (1993, key animation)
- Ningyo no Kizu (1993, character design and chief animation director)
- Final Fantasy (OVA) (1994, key animation)
- Tokyo Babylon 2 (1994, character design and chief animation director)
- CLAMP in Wonderland (1994, character design and chief animation director)
- DNA² (1994–1995, character design and chief animation director)
- Azuki-chan (1995–1998, key animation)
- Tetsuwan Birdy (1996, character design and chief animation director)
- Cardcaptor Sakura (1998–2000, character design and chief animation director)
- Witch Hunter Robin (2002, character design and chief animation director)
- InuYasha (2000–2004, animation director and key animation)
- Scrapped Princess (2003, key animation)
- Kurau Phantom Memory (2004, animation director)
- Sōkyū no Fafner (2004, key animation)
- Fullmetal Alchemist (2003–2004, animation director and key animation)
- Ouran High School Host Club (2006, character design and chief animation director)
- Tenpō Ibun Ayakashi Ayashi (2006–2007, animation direction assistance)
- Darker than Black: Kuro no Keiyakusha (2007, animation director)
- Kekkaishi (2008, key animation)
- Allison & Lillia (2008, animation director)
- Mobile Suit Gundam Unicorn (2010-2016, character design, chief animation director)
- Snow White with the Red Hair (2015, character design)
- Mobile Suit Gundam Narrative (2018, character design)
- City Hunter: Shinjuku Private Eyes (2019, character design)
