= Hideo Ishikawa =

Japanese voice actor and narrator (born 1969)

- 石川 英郎
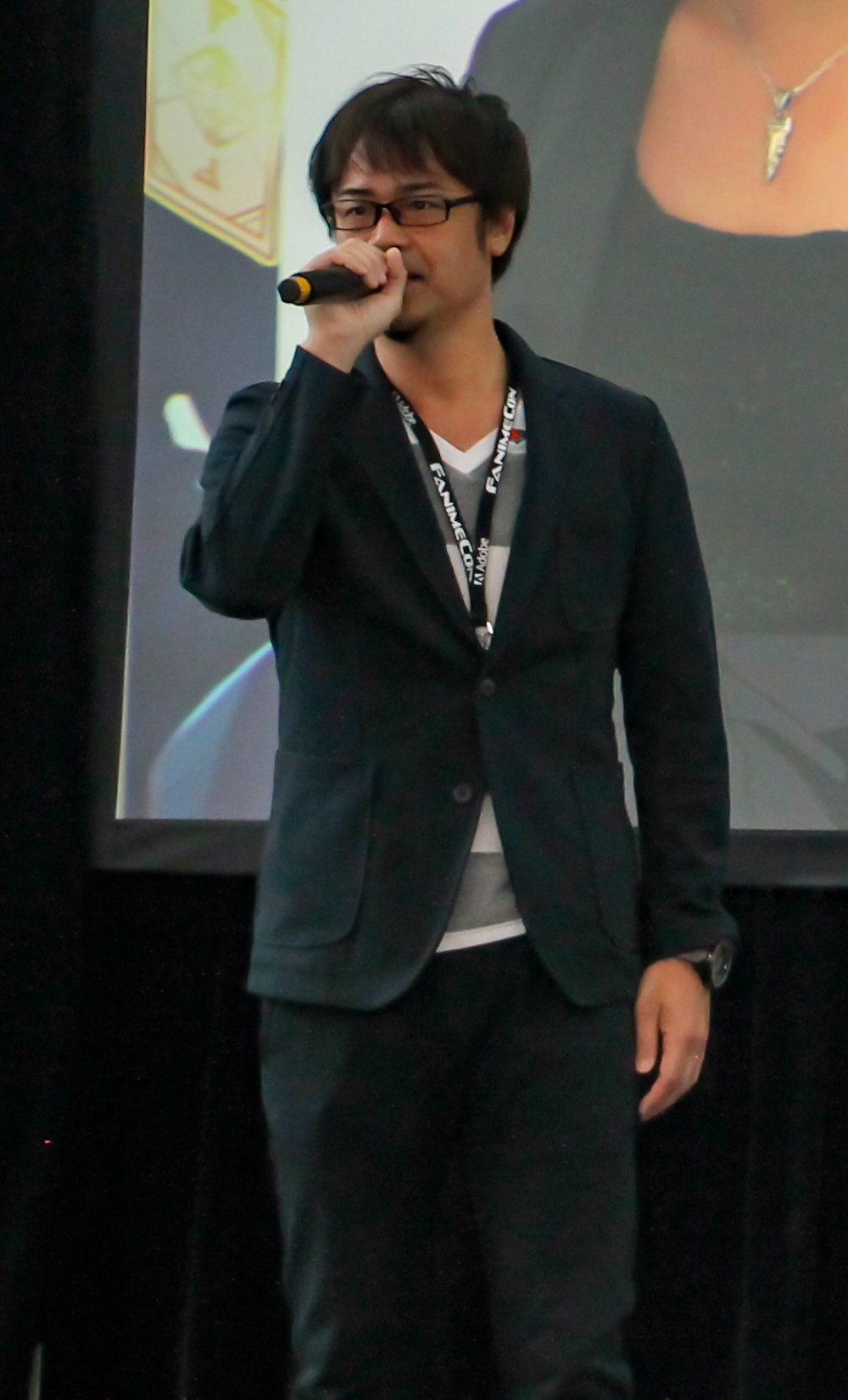
- Ishikawa at FanimeCon 2017
- Born: December 13, 1969 (age 56); Nishinomiya, Hyōgo Prefecture, Japan
- Status: Married
- Other names: Hide (ヒデさん, Hide-san)
- Occupations: Voice actor, narrator
- Years active: 1993–present
- Agent: Aoni Production
- Notable work: Naruto as Itachi Uchiha; Final Fantasy VIII as Squall Leonhart; Bleach as Jūshirō Ukitake; Slam Dunk as Kicchō Fukuda

Hideo Ishikawa (石川 英郎, Ishikawa Hideo; born December 13, 1969) is a Japanese voice actor and narrator from Hyōgo Prefecture, Japan. He is currently affiliated with Aoni Production. He is known for being the voice of Kicchō Fukuda in Slam Dunk, Jūshirō Ukitake in Bleach, Auron in Final Fantasy X, Itachi Uchiha in Naruto, Squall Leonhart in the Final Fantasy and Kingdom Hearts series, Pierre de Chaltier in Tales of Destiny, and Ryoma Nagare in Getter Robo and Super Robot Wars.

== Filmography ==
=== Television animation ===
1993

- Slam Dunk as Kicchou Fukuda, Hiroshi Morishige, Tatsumasa Oda, Teruo Ookawa
- Sailor Moon R as Driver, Man

1994

- Captain Tsubasa J as Makoto Soda
- Dragon Ball Z as Monk, Subordinate A
- New Cutie Honey as Adonis

1998

- Outlaw Star as Father, Silgrian
- Cooking Master Boy as Raihou
- Bubblegum Crisis: Tokyo 2040 as Masaki
- All Purpose Cultural Cat Girl Nuku Nuku as Eiichi Ikenami
- Fancy Lala as Hiroya Aikawa
- Record of Lodoss War: Chronicles of the Heroic Knight as Randy
- Getter Robo Armageddon as Ryoma Nagare

1999

- Gokudo as Hanayo
- Bucky - The Incredible Kid as Geki
- GTO: Great Teacher Onizuka as Hideo
- One Piece as Fullbody

2000

- Platinumhugen Ordian as Satoru Tachibana
- Gravitation as Tatsuha Uesugi
- Muteki-ō Tri-Zenon as Jin Makinohara
- Shin Getter Robo vs Neo Getter Robo as Ryoma Nagare

2001

- Tales of Eternia as John
- The SoulTaker as Umon
- Mamimume Mogacho as DJ Mash
- Rave Master as Schneider

2003

- Avenger as Jade
- Tantei Gakuen Q as Kintaro Tooyama
- Getbackers as Boss

2004

- Naruto as Itachi Uchiha
- New Getter Robo as Ryoma Nagare
- Gravion Zwei as Ewan

2005

- Bleach as Jūshirō Ukitake
- Transformers: Cybertron as Dreadlock

2006

- La Corda D'Oro: primo passo as Hiroto Kanazawa
- Innocent Venus as Toraji Shiba
- Death Note as Hideki Ide, Raye Penber
- Night Head Genesis as Jin Tanaka
- Ring ni Kakero 1: Nichibei Kessen Hen as Kazuki Shinatora
- Marginal Prince as Stanislav Sokurov

2007

- Naruto: Shippuden as Itachi Uchiha
- Kaiji as Funai

2008

- Kyōran Kazoku Nikki as Dekamelon
- Hell Girl: Three Vessels as Tange Hideto
- Fantastic Detective Labyrinth as Kantarou Izumi
- Porfy no Nagai Tabi as Cloud
- Rin: Daughters of Mnemosyne as Shōgo Shimazaki

2009

- La Corda D'Oro ~secondo passo~ as Hiroto Kanazawa
- Phantom ~Requiem for the Phantom~ as Issac Wisemel

2010

- Tegami Bachi as Dr. Thunderland Jr
- Tegami Bachi: Reverse as Dr. Thunderland Jr.
- Battle Spirits: Brave as Rahze
- Yu-Gi-Oh! 5D's as Z-ONE
- Ring ni Kakero 1: Shadow as Kazuki Shinatora

2011

- We Without Wings - Under the Innocent Sky as Karuo Karube
- Gosick as Wong Kai
- Ring ni Kakero 1: Sekai Taikai-hen as Kazuki Shinatora

2012

- Senki Zesshō Symphogear as Genjūrō Kazanari
- Naruto Spin-Off: Rock Lee & His Ninja Pals as Itachi Uchiha
- Aesthetica of a Rogue Hero as Ken'ya Onizuka

2013

- Senki Zesshō Symphogear G as Genjūrō Kazanari

2014

- La Corda d'Oro Blue Sky as Hōsei Toki
- Hero Bank as Ryūga Tennōji
- Lord Marksman and Vanadis as Emir

2015

- Assassination Classroom as Asano Gakuho
- My Love Story!! as Molester 2
- Senki Zesshō Symphogear GX as Genjūrō Kazanari
- Sengoku Musou as Toyotomi Hideyoshi

2016

- Pandora in the Crimson Shell: Ghost Urn as Mr. chicken

2017

- Senki Zesshō Symphogear AXZ as Genjūrō Kazanari

2018

- JoJo's Bizarre Adventure: Golden Wind as Polpo / Black Sabbath

2019

- Senki Zesshō Symphogear XV as Genjūrō Kazanari

2021

- Getter Robo Arc as Ryoma Nagare

2022

- Uzaki-chan Wants to Hang Out! ω as Fujio Uzaki
- Bleach: Thousand-Year Blood War as Jūshirō Ukitake

2024

- Kinnikuman: Perfect Origin Arc as Knock

2026

- Hell Mode as Rodan

=== Original video animation (OVA) ===
- Final Fantasy VII Advent Children (2006) as Cait Sith
- Saint Seiya: The Lost Canvas (2008) as Oneiros
- Voltage Fighter Gowcaizer (1996) as Ikki Tachibana/Brider 1, Captain Atlantis/Randy Riggs and Platonic Twins/Ryo Asahina
- Wild Adapter (xxxx) as Tokito Minoru

=== Drama CD ===
- Samurai Shodown (1994) as Tam Tam, Ukyo Tachibana
- The King of Fighters '94 (1995) as Robert Garcia

=== Theatrical animation ===
- Slam Dunk: Conquer the Nation, Hanamichi Sakuragi! (1994) as Kenta Mine
- Road to Ninja: Naruto the Movie (2012) as Itachi Uchiha
- Classmates (2016) as Manabu Hara

=== Video games ===
- Voltage Fighter Gowcaizer (1995) as Captain Atlantis, Ryo Asahina
- Money Puzzle Exchanger (1997) as Blibov Sakata / Mackermocally
- Final Fantasy X (2001) as Auron
- Kingdom Hearts (2002) as Leon
- Ore no Shita de Agake (2002) as Takafumi Higuchi
- DreamMix TV World Fighters (2003) as Simon Belmont, Yugo Ogami
- Final Fantasy X-2 (2003) as Auron
- Ace Combat 5: The Unsung War (2004) as Alvin H. Davenport
- Airforce Delta Strike (2004) as David Smith, Albert Ungar
- Kingdom Hearts II (2005) as Leon, Auron
- Dirge of Cerberus: Final Fantasy VII (2006) as Cait Sith
- Last Escort (2006) as Satoru Kushinoyuki
- The Legend of Heroes: Trails in the Sky (2006) as Cid, Jean
- Naruto: Ultimate Ninja Storm (2008) as Itachi Uchiha
- Dissidia: Final Fantasy (2008) as Squall Leonhart
- Tales of Hearts R (2008) as Galando Grinus
- Samurai Warriors 3 (2009) as Motonari Mori
- Yakuza 4 (2010) as Daisaku Minami
- Zangeki no Reginleiv (2010) as Tyr
- Naruto Shippuden: Ultimate Ninja Storm 2 (2010) as Itachi Uchiha
- Dragon Ball: Raging Blast 2 (2010) as Hatchihyakku
- Dissidia 012 Final Fantasy (2011) as Squall Leonhart
- Final Fantasy Type-0 (2011) as Qator Bashtar
- Naruto Shippuden: Ultimate Ninja Storm Generations (2012) as Itachi Uchiha
- Yakuza 5 (2012) as Kamon Kanai
- Final Fantasy Explorers (2014) as Squall Leonhart
- Dissidia Final Fantasy NT (2015) as Squall Leonhart
- Time Crisis 5 (2015) as Keith Martin
- Super Robot Wars OG The Moon Dwellers (2016) as Al-Van Ranks
- World of Final Fantasy (2016) as Squall Leonhart
- Dissidia Final Fantasy Opera Omnia (2017) as Squall Leonhart
- Super Smash Bros. Ultimate (2018) as Simon Belmont, Mii Fighters
- Kingdom Hearts III Re Mind (2020) as Leon
- Live A Live (2022) as Kenichi Matsu
- Chocobo GP (2022) as Squall Leonhart
- Final Fantasy VII: Ever Crisis (2023) as Cait Sith
- Final Fantasy VII Rebirth (2024) as Cait Sith
- Reynatis (2024) as Ryunosuke Shidou
- Wuthering Waves (2024) as Fenrico
- Like a Dragon: Pirate Yakuza in Hawaii (2025) as Daisaku Minami

Unknown date

- Destrega as Gradd
- Dynasty Warriors 4 as Zhou Tai
- Dynasty Warriors 7 as Jia Xu
- Final Fantasy Type-0 HD as Qator Bashtar
- Kaiser Knuckle (known outside Japan as Global Champion) as Gekkou
- Kessen as Ii Naomasa
- Kiniro no Corda as Hiroto Kanazawa
- Kiniro no Corda 2 as Hiroto Kanazawa
- Langrisser I & II as Taylor
- Rockman X6 as Rainy Turtloid, Blizzard Wolfang
- Onimusha: Dawn of Dreams as Tenkai Nankobo (Samonosuke Akechi)
- Tales of Destiny as Pierre de Chaltier (PS2 remake)
- Tales of Eternia as Roen and Gnome
- Voltage Fighter Gowcaizer as Captain Atlantis/Randy Riggs and Platonic Twins/Ryo Asahina
- Xenosaga as Kevin Winnicot
- Yo-Jin-Bo as Tsubaki Tainojō
- Samurai Warriors 2 as Hideyoshi Toyotomi until Spirit of Sanada
- Soshite Bokura Wa as Shuhei Aoyama
- Super Robot Taisen OG: The Moon Dwellers (2016), Al-Van Lunks
- Warriors Orochi 3 as Jia Xu until 4 Ultimate

=== Drama CD ===
- 110 Ban wa Koi no Hajimari series 1, as Yasuto Fuse
- 3 Ji Kara Koi wo Suru series 1: 3 Ji Kara Koi wo Suru I, as Ryoutarou Fujishiba
- 3 Ji Kara Koi wo Suru series 2: 3 Ji Kara Koi wo Suru II, as Ryoutarou Fujishiba
- 3 Ji Kara Koi wo Suru series 3: 3 Ji Kara Koi wo Suru III, as Ryoutarou Fujishiba
- 3 Ji Kara Koi wo Suru series 5: 8 Ji Han Kara Fall In Love, as Ryoutarou Fujishiba
- Boxer Wa Inu Ni Naru series 1: Boxer Wa Inu Ni Naru, as Abel
- Boxer Wa Inu Ni Naru series 2: Doctor Wa Inu wo Kau, as Abel
- Boxer Wa Inu Ni Naru series 4: Akuta Wa Inu wo Enjiru, as Abel
- Broadcast o Toppatsure!, as Uzuki Kuno
- Count Cain, as Cain Hargreaves
- Dokyusei, as Manabu Hara
- Finder Series, as Feilong
- Hameteyaru!, as Kouji
- Koi no Series 2: Koi no Seasoning, as Tousui Jougasaki
- Koi no Series 3: Koi no Mixing, as Tousui Jougasaki
- Rolex ni Kuchizukewo, as Hitoshi Takeuchi
- Saikyou no Koibito, as Yuuya Ikuno
- Sora to Hara, as Manabu Hara
- Sotsugyosei, as Manabu Hara
- Wild Adapter, as Tokito Minoru
- Yellow, as Go
- Yokubo no Vector, as Tatsuro Hasabe

=== Tokusatsu ===
- Ultraman Tiga (1996) as Irudo (Voice: Kazue Ikura) (ep. 41)
- Mirai Sentai Timeranger (2000) as Blackmailing School Gang Leader Flan (ep. 17)
- Hyakujuu Sentai Gaoranger (2001) as Duke Org Propela (ep. 32–33)
- Kamen Rider Decade (2009) as Ten-Faced Demon Llumu Qhimil (ep. 28–29)
- OOO, Den-O, All Riders: Let's Go Kamen Riders (2011) as Ten-Faced Demon Llumu Qhimil, Inazuman, Shocker Greeed
- Kaizoku Sentai Gokaiger (2011) as Zodomas (ep. 4)
- Kamen Rider × Kamen Rider Fourze & OOO: Movie War Mega Max (2011) as Kamen Rider Stronger
- Kamen Rider × Super Sentai: Super Hero Taisen (2012) as Kamen Rider Hibiki, Doras other
- Kamen Rider × Super Sentai × Space Sheriff: Super Hero Taisen Z (2013) as Zanjioh, Sabotegron other
- Heisei Riders vs. Shōwa Riders: Kamen Rider Taisen feat. Super Sentai (2014) as Skyrider, General Shadow, General Jark, Ten-Faced Demon other
- Ressha Sentai ToQger (2014) as Film Shadow (ep. 39)
- Super Hero Taisen GP: Kamen Rider 3 (2015) as Rider Man other
- Uchu Sentai Kyuranger (2017) as Gamettsui (ep. 2)

=== Dubbing roles ===
- 2 Days in the Valley as Wes Taylor (Eric Stoltz)
- Abraham Lincoln: Vampire Hunter as Abraham Lincoln (Benjamin Walker)
- Ghost Ship as Dodge (Ron Eldard)
