= Witch Hunter Robin =

Japanese anime television series

- Cover of the first North American DVD volume
- Genre: Occult mystery; Supernatural; Thriller
- Created by: Hajime Yatate; Shūkō Murase
- Anime television series
- Directed by: Shūkō Murase
- Produced by: Keiichi Matsumura; Atsushi Sugita
- Written by: Aya Yoshinaga
- Music by: Taku Iwasaki
- Studio: Sunrise
- Licensed by: Crunchyroll; AUS: Madman Entertainment
- Original network: TV Tokyo
- English network: CA: YTV; SEA: Animax Asia; UK: AnimeCentral; US: Adult Swim
- Original run: July 2, 2002 – December 24, 2002
- Episodes: 26

Witch Hunter Robin (stylized in all caps) is a Japanese anime television series produced by Sunrise and created and directed by Shūkō Murase. The series originally aired in Japan on TV Tokyo between July and December 2002. The series was licensed for North American distribution by Bandai Entertainment.

The series follows a fictional Japanese branch of a secret global organization called "SOLOMON" or the "Solomon Toukatsu Nin'idantai" (roughly "Solomon Executive Organization"), abbreviated as "STN" or "STN-J". Solomon fights the harmful use of witchcraft using a database of witches, which includes those who have obtained the power of witchcraft through genetics and others who carry the gene (called "seeds") in order to arrest or eliminate them should their powers "awaken". The series focuses on one STN-J member, Robin Sena.

== Plot ==
Robin Sena is a "craft user", born in Japan and raised by the Roman Catholic Church in Italy. She is trained to use her craft of fire to hunt down witches. Witchcraft is a genetic trait, dormant within a number of individuals within the human population. Powers can be "awakened" in these dormant human "seeds" at any time, which seems to also drive the awakened witch into various forms of homicidal madness or sociopathy. Trained hunters, craft-users or "seeds" themselves that have not become full witches, are needed to keep watch over "seeds" and hunt those whose abilities become active, serving in secret organizations, such as the parent branch "Solomon" and the "STN-J" branch in Japan, as self-appointed witch police to curtail the use of witchcraft in society, and to keep the witch kind a secret from the public. Even the police, who cooperate with STN-J in abnormal criminal cases, do not know what STN-J does. The series begins when Robin arrives in Japan from Italy to gain information for Solomon headquarters about a fabled item that holds the "secrets of the craft," while acting undercover as a new hunter to the STN-J in their efforts to stop and capture witches.

"Orbo" is a green liquid that negates witch abilities. STN-J's hunters carry small vials of it on necklaces in the shape of a cross as a form of protection against their targets' craft. Hunters also carry air pistols which fire darts or pellets of Orbo that dampen witch powers when it enters the bloodstream of the target witch. Hunters who are craft-users or seeds can use Orbo without ill effects, although their own powers are reportedly diminished while using it. Robin, a craft-user herself, declines to use Orbo because she feels it is "disgusting". As the series goes on, Robin grows increasingly uncomfortable with her role in hunting and capturing other witches. She begins to question the treatment they receive while incarcerated in the mysterious "Factory". After the discovery of "secrets of the craft," she is entrapped and attacked twice by "witch bullets". Subsequently, the STN-J is attacked, presumably for "secrets of the craft," although the Solomon attack was carried out to find what Zaizen, the director of the STN-J, was planning.

Robin begins to worry that she will become a target and grows to suspect that her partner Amon will hunt her. Eventually, Robin does become a target of Solomon and labeled a witch, becoming "hunted". In the end, Robin finds out more about her craft and that of witches than she knew at the beginning. Initially, the series appears to take a "monster of the week" approach. About halfway through the 26-episode season, the characters and the relationships between them are established and the main plot gets underway.

== Media ==
=== Anime ===
The TV series was produced by Sunrise and Bandai Visual and directed by Shūkō Murase, with Aya Yoshinaga serving the role of chief writer, Kumiko Takahashi designing the characters and Taku Iwasaki composing the music. The series originally aired in Japan on TV Tokyo between July 2 and December 24, 2002.

The series was licensed for North American distribution by Bandai Entertainment. In October 2003, it debuted at the 3rd Annual Metreon Festival of Anime in San Francisco, followed by a Q&A and autograph session from Kari Wahlgren, who provided the voice for the title character. It was later aired across the United States on Cartoon Network's Adult Swim late-night programming block beginning February 16, 2004 (it was given a second full run on Adult Swim in the Fall of 2004 before the broadcast rights were left to expire). It has also been aired across Canada on YTV's Bionix block from September 10, 2004. Following the closure of Bandai Entertainment in 2012, Sunrise announced at their at Otakon 2013, that Funimation has rescued the series, along with a handful of other former Bandai Entertainment titles. In the United Kingdom and Ireland the series was broadcast in a daily stripped timeslot on AnimeCentral from January 5 to January 30, 2008, with an immediate rerun from January 31.

==== Soundtrack ====
The music of Witch Hunter Robin was composed by Taku Iwasaki. Both the opening and ending themes were performed by Bana (aka Chino Takayanagi). Two soundtrack CDs have been released by Victor Entertainment. The first Witch Hunter Robin Original Sound Score I was released on September 21, 2002. It contains twenty-three tracks, including TV edits of the opening and ending themes. The second soundtrack Witch Hunter Robin Original Sound Score II was released on November 21, 2002. It also contained twenty-three tracks with a guitar version of the opening theme. A shortened version of this guitar-only theme was used as the ending theme for Episode 15 "Time to Say Goodbye". A single containing the opening and ending themes and karaoke versions was released on August 21, 2002.

=== Live-action series ===
On April 5, 2004, the SciFi Channel released a press release stating a listing of new series and films in development for the future, one of which was a live action version of Witch Hunter Robin produced by Roy Lee and Doug Davison, who were credited as the producers for the movie The Ring. No premiere date was given. It was later revealed that the live action version developed by Sci-Fi had been dropped from production.

== Reception ==
The series has received many comments from staff of Anime News Network. Bamboo Dong, a columnist from the website, has stated that she cannot make enough positive comments about the series and that it is "a show that everyone must absolutely see". She also comments that the ending "is a wonderful way to cap off the series" and that it retained the series' solid sense of action. However, she comments that the ending moved a little too fast and spent much of its time with plot revelations, missing its chance to give the series "that extra kick". Carlo Santos praised the series, saying that it was a unique tale that was gorgeous and engrossing to watch and one of 2004's best adventure anime. Ryan Matthews has praised the cast choices in his column, saying that the cast is well-suited to their roles, but the performances were flat. He also notes that the ADR script was filled with clumsy wording and mid-sentence stops. He comments that it seems that the script was written without trying to match the animation. In his review, Zac Bertschy from Anime News Network says that the series is highly original and very well executed. Bertschy praises the sound track. He notes that the character designs fit well with series' visual style and the characters' expressions were convincing. And concluded his review with "In short, Witch Hunter Robin is this fall's anime bright spot (despite being almost entirely black and gray). This is a mature, evenly paced supernatural thriller, chock full of mystery, intrigue, and a few exciting battles for good measure. One of the best anime series of all time and certainly the best one this year".

Jason Bustard from THEM Anime Reviews comments that the supernatural and spooky undercurrent in the setting would fit perfectly into The X-Files or Millennium television series. The characters are received as a "mixed bunch". The main cast is said to have "distinct and fully rendered personalities", all of which are well-done. In contrast to the review from Anime News Network, Bustard believed that the story moved at a brisk pace. Although he agreed that action fans would find the series dull and added that comedy and romance fans would not enjoy the series either. Tasha Robinson of Sci Fi Channel's Sci Fi Weekly commented that it was difficult to decide whom to "root for" as the witches seemed to be insane killers, but the protagonists were "killers of a colder, more controlled stripe" and were generally unpleasant, with the exceptions of Karasuma and Zaizen. She also noted that the characters give no indication as to why they work for the STN. Robin and Amon's character designs are said to be strange. The series' setting was said to be "a fairly severe, almost oppressive gothic design" and that the color palette and the plot's focus on the occult contributed to the dark feel. The pace steeply picks up once the protagonists head into battle. It is also noted that the series' could have afforded to reveal more information earlier in the series instead of teasing the audience with mysteries; just like many other reviewers, she comments that the mysteries were worth the wait.

Witch Hunter Robin placed second on a list of top anime properties for 2004's first quarter and placed sixth for the third quarter.
