= Jun Kawagoe =

Japanese anime director

- Occupations: Animator; storyboard artist; director
- Known for: Cyborg 009 The Cyborg Soldier, New Getter Robo, Anpanman

Jun Kawagoe (川越 淳, Kawagoe Jun) is a Japanese animator, storyboard artist, and director. He is known for directing anime based on the works of Go Nagai, Ken Ishikawa, Takashi Yanase, and twice, Shotaro Ishinomori.

== Works (as director) ==
- Shuten Douji (1991) episode 3
- Getter Robo Armageddon (1998) episode 4-13
- Shin Getter Robo vs Neo Getter Robo (2000)
- éX-Driver OAV (2000)
- Cyborg 009 The Cyborg Soldier (2001)
- Lupin III: Operation: Return the Treasure (2003)
- New Getter Robo (2004)
- Transformers: Energon (2004)
- Super Robot Wars Original Generation: The Animation (2005)
- Innocent Venus (2006)
- Kotetsushin Jeeg (2007)
- Soreike! Anpanman: Dadandan to Futago no Hoshi (2009)
- Mazinkaizer SKL (2010)
- Anpanman: Apple Boy and Everyone's Hope (2014)
- Cyborg 009 VS Devilman (2015)
- Soreike! Anpanman: Nanda and Runda of the Toy Star (2016)
- Lupin the 3rd: Goodbye Partner (2019)
- Getter Robo Arc (2021)
- Insect Land (2022)
- Anpanman: Baikinman and Lulun in the Picture Book (2024)
