= Yūji Mitsuya =

Japanese actor (born 1954)

- 三ツ矢 雄二
- Born: October 18, 1954 (age 71); Toyohashi, Aichi Prefecture, Japan
- Education: Meiji University
- Occupations: Actor; voice actor; director of audiography; sound supervisor; voice director
- Years active: 1967–present
- Agent: Mitsuya Project
- Height: 158.5 cm (5 ft 2 in)
- Website: mitsuya-project.jp

Yūji Mitsuya (三ツ矢 雄二, Mitsuya Yūji; born October 18, 1954) is a Japanese actor, voice actor, director of audiography, voice director, and sound supervisor from Toyohashi, Aichi Prefecture who is affiliated with Mitsuya Project. He graduated from Meiji University.

He is best known for his roles in The Lion King as Timon, Touch as Tatsuya Uesugi, Combattler V as Hyōma Aoi, Kiteretsu Daihyakka as Kōji Togari, Saint Seiya as Virgo Shaka, and the TV Asahi version of the Japanese dub of the Back to the Future trilogy as Marty McFly.

Mitsuya came out as gay on a TV show on January 12, 2017. In January 2022, Mitsuya revealed that he had been diagnosed with prostate cancer in January 2021.

== Filmography ==
=== Television animation ===
- Candy Candy (1976) as Archibald "Archie" Cornwell
- Combattler V (1976) (Hyoma Aoi)
- Sasuga no Sarutobi (1982) (Sarutobi Nikumaru)
- Captain Tsubasa (1983) (Shun Nitta)
- Georgie! (1983) (Lowell J. Gray) (Royal)
- Nanako SOS (1983) (Tomoshige Yotsuya)
- Serendipity the Pink Dragon (1983) (Pira Pira)
- Choriki Robo Galatt (1984) (Saradaayu)
- Glass no Kamen (1984 TV series) (1984) (Sakurakouji Yuu)
- Touch (1985) (Tatsuya Uesugi)
- Saint Seiya (1986) (Virgo Shaka)
- Saint Seiya (1988) (Benetnasch Eta Mime)
- Hiatari Ryōkō! (1987) (Yūsaku Takasugi)
- Anpanman (1988) (Katsudonman), (Hamburger Kid)
- Dragon Ball Z (1989) (Kaio-shin, Gregory, and Kibito Kai {the merged form of Supreme Kai and Kibito})
- Ranma ½ (1989) (Ono Tofu-sensei)
- Time Travel Tondekeman (1989) (Hayato Shindou)
- Akazukin Chacha (1994) (Sorges, Yordas, Haideyans)
- Nurse Angel Ririka SOS (1995) (Kurumi Moriya)
- Ojarumaru (1998) (Captain Silver)
- PaRapper the Rapper (2001) (Hairdresser Octopus)
- Stitch! (2008) (Pleakley)
- Kuchu Buranko (2009) (Young Irabu Ichiro)
- Nichijou (2011) (Clay in episode 19)
- Toriko (2011) (Grinpatch)
- Gon (2012) (Choro)
- Smile PreCure! (2012) (Joker)
- Space Dandy (2014) (CEO in episode 20)
- One Piece (2015) (Pica)
- Saint Seiya: Soul of Gold (2015) (Virgo Shaka)
- Junji Ito Collection (2018) (Souichi Tsujii)
- Pop Team Epic (2018) (Popuko (Episode 1-B))

=== OVA ===
- Megazone 23 (1985) (Mōri)
- Majo demo Steady (1986) (Hisashi Seki)
- Legend of the Galactic Heroes (1988) (Heinrich Von Kümmel)
- Space Family Carlvinson (1988) (Andy)
- Vampire Princess Miyu (1988) (Lemures)
- Starship Troopers (1988) (Carl)
- Fairy King (1988) (Jack Oshinumi/Gwyn)
- The Enemy's the Pirates! (1989) (Apulo)
- Devil Hunter Yohko (1990) (Madoka Mano)

=== Theatrical animation ===
- Candy Candy – Candy no Natsu Yasumi (1978)
- Natsu e no Tobira (1981) (Claude)
- Godmars (1982) (Marg)
- Doraemon: Nobita and the Castle of the Undersea Devil (1983) (Underwater Buggy)
- Doraemon: Nobita's Little Star Wars (1985) (LocoRoco)
- Doraemon: Nobita and the Steel Troops (1986) (Micros)
- Touch: Sebangou no Nai Ace (1986) (Tatsuya Uesugi)
- Touch 2: Sayounara no Okurimono (1986) (Tatsuya Uesugi)
- Bug-tte Honey: Megaromu Shojo Ma 4622 (1987) (Wannappu)
- Saint Seiya: Evil Goddess Eris (1987) (Lyra Orpheus)
- Touch 3: Don't Pass Me By (1987) (Tatsuya Uesugi)
- Doraemon: The Record of Nobita's Parallel Visit to the West (1988) (Time Machine)
- Hiatari Ryoko! Yume no Naka ni Kimi ga Ita (1988) (Yūsaku Takasugi)
- Doraemon: Nobita and the Birth of Japan (1989) (Time Machine)
- Anpanman: Baikinman's Counterattack (1990) (Hamburger Kid), (Katsudonman)
- Magical Taruruto-kun (1991) (Tabashiba)
- Yu Yu Hakusho The Movie: Poltergeist Report (1994) (Majari)
- Sakura Wars: The Movie (2001) (Musei Edogawa)
- Anpanman: Gomira's Star (2001) (Katsudonman)
- Anpanman: Dolly of the Star of Life (2006) (Katsudonman)
- Anpanman: Kokin-chan and the Blue Tears (2006) (Katsudonman)
- Anpanman: Purun of the Bubble Ball (2007) (Katsudonman)
- Anpanman: Rinrin the Fairy's Secret (2008) (Katsudonman)
- Dragon Ball Z: Battle of Gods (2013) (Kibito Kaioushin)
- Toriko the Movie: Bishokushin's Special Menu (2013) (Grinpatch)
- Soreike! Anpanman: Ringo Bō Ya To Min'Nano Negai (2014) (Hamburger Kid)
- Crayon Shin-chan: Crash! Graffiti Kingdom and Almost Four Heroes (2020) (Wizard)

=== Video games ===
- Brave Fencer Musashi (1998) (Rādo)
- Sakura Wars 3: Is Paris Burning? (2001) (Masque De Corbeau)
- Kingdom Hearts (2002) (Doctor Finkelstein)
- Kingdom Hearts II (2005) (Doctor Finkelstein, Timon)
- Sakura Wars 3: Is Paris Burning? (2001) (Masque De Corbeau)
- Super Robot Taisen (????) (Aoi Hyouma)
- Dragon Quest Heroes II (2016)
- Persona 5 (2016) (Suguru Kamoshida)
- Xenoblade Chronicles 2 (2017) (Muimui)
- League of Legends (Shaco, Viego)
- Kingdom Hearts III (2019) (Rex)

=== Live-action TV drama ===
- X-Bomber (1980) (PP Adamsky)
- Kaitou Sentai Lupinranger VS Keisatsu Sentai Patranger (2018) (GoodStriker (eps 2 - 13, 15 - 51))

=== Live-action film ===
- Kamen Rider × Kamen Rider Wizard & Fourze: Movie War Ultimatum (2012) (Gahra)
- Kaitou Sentai Lupinranger VS Keisatsu Sentai Patranger en Film (2018) (GoodStriker)

=== Dubbing roles ===
==== Live-action ====
- Michael J. Fox
  - Back to the Future (TV Asahi edition) (Marty McFly)
  - Back to the Future Part II (TV Asahi edition) (Marty McFly Senior, Marty McFly Junior, Marlene McFly)
  - Back to the Future Part III (TV Asahi and TV Nippon editions) (Marty McFly, Seamus McFly)
  - The Frighteners (Frank Bannister)
  - Stuart Little (TV edition) (Stuart Little)
- Amadeus (Wolfgang Amadeus Mozart (Tom Hulce)
- American Graffiti (1984 TBS edition) (Terry "The Toad" Fields (Charles Martin Smith))
- The Blue Lagoon (1983 TBS edition) (Richard Lestrange (Christopher Atkins))
- The Bonfire of the Vanities (Sherman McCoy (Tom Hanks))
- The Cat in the Hat (The Fish (Sean Hayes))
- The Empire Strikes Back (1980 Movie theater edition) (Dak Ralter (John Morton))
- Family Business (Adam McMullen (Matthew Broderick))
- The Fifth Element (Blu-ray and 2002 TV Asahi edition) (Ruby Rhod (Chris Tucker))
- Flight of the Phoenix (Elliott (Giovanni Ribisi))
- Fraggle Rock (NHK version) (Wembley Fraggle (Steve Whitmire))
- Full House (Steve Urkel (Jaleel White))
- Garfield: The Movie (Louis (Nick Cannon))
- Good Morning, Vietnam (Lt. Steven Hauk (Bruno Kirby))
- Joe's Apartment (Ralph Roach)
- Lilo & Stitch (Pleakley (Billy Magnussen))
- Little Shop of Horrors (Seymour Krelbourn (Rick Moranis))
- Men in Black 3 (Griffin (Michael Stuhlbarg))
- Moms' Night Out (Sean (Sean Astin))
- Mouse Hunt (Lars Smuntz (Lee Evans))
- Pacific Rim (Dr. Hermann Gottlieb (Burn Gorman))
- Pacific Rim: Uprising (Dr. Hermann Gottlieb (Burn Gorman))
- Project A (Tai Po)
- Riptide (Murray 'Boz' Bozinsky (Thom Bray))
- Short Circuit (Johnny 5)
- Small Soldiers (Insaniac)
- Soap (Jodie Dallas (Billy Crystal))
- West Side Story (1979 TBS edition) (Baby John (Eliot Feld))
- Will & Grace (Jack McFarland (Sean Hayes))
- xXx (Agent Toby Lee Shavers (Michael Roof))

==== Animation ====
- The Adventures of Tintin (1989 Nikkatsu edition) (Tintin)
- The Brave Little Toaster (1993 NHK edition) (Radio)
- Hotel Transylvania (Murray)
- The Land Before Time (Petrie)
- Lilo & Stitch (Pleakley)
- Lilo & Stitch: The Series (Pleakley)
- The Lion Guard (Timon)
- The Lion King (Timon)
- The Lion King II: Simba's Pride (Timon)
- The Lion King 1½ (Timon)
- Timon and Pumbaa (Timon)
- Looney Tunes (Speedy Gonzales)
- The Looney Tunes Show (Speedy Gonzales)
- The Nightmare Before Christmas (Doctor Finkelstein)
- Oliver & Company (Tito)
- Robots (Tim the Gate Guard)
- Space Jam: A New Legacy (Speedy Gonzales)
- Star Wars: The Clone Wars (Jar Jar Binks)
- Thumbelina (Miss Fieldmouse)
- Toy Story series (Rex)
- Monsters, Inc. (Mike Wazowski, teaser)

==== Japanese voice-over ====
- Star Tours (Captain Rex)
- Star Tours—The Adventures Continue (Captain Rex)
- Peter Pan's Flight (Tick-Tock the Crocodile)
