= Anpanman: Chapon's Hero! =

2025 film by Toshikazu Hashimoto

- Theatrical release poster
- Japanese: それいけ! アンパンマン チャポンのヒーロー!
- Directed by: Toshikazu Hashimoto
- Screenplay by: Shuji Kuzuhara
- Based on: Anpanman by Takashi Yanase
- Starring: Keiko Toda; Ryūsei Nakao; Yū Aoi; Satoshi Mukai; Takahiro Ogata; Ryōtarō Kan
- Music by: Taku Izumi; Hiroaki Kondo
- Production company: TMS Entertainment
- Distributed by: Tokyo Theatres
- Release date: June 27, 2025
- Running time: 89 minutes
- Country: Japan
- Language: Japanese

Anpanman: Chapon's Hero! (Japanese: それいけ! アンパンマン チャポンのヒーロー!, Hepburn: Soreike! Anpanman: Chapon no Hero!) is a Japanese animated children's fantasy film directed by Hiroyuki Yano from a screenplay by Shuji Kuzuhara. Produced by TMS Entertainment, the film serves as the 36th entry of the Anpanman film series, itself based on the Anpanman book series by Takashi Yanase. The film stars the show's regular voice cast alongside guest stars such as actress Yū Aoi and comedian group Panther. The film was released on June 27, 2025, by Tokyo Theatres.

== Cast ==
Character	Japanese voice actor	Source
Anpanman	Keiko Toda	
Baikinman	Ryūsei Nakao	
Uncle Jam	Kōichi Yamadera	
Batako	Rei Sakuma	
Cheese	Kōichi Yamadera	
Dokin-chan	Miina Tominaga	
Kokin-chan	Aya Hirano	
Horrorman	Kōsuke Okamoto (Note: This film marks Okamoto's debut in the role, taking over from Kazuki Yao who previously voiced the character from 2017 to 2024. Okamoto would later debut in the Let's Go! Anpanman anime series as the character in "Horrorman and Moth Orchid-san" (『ホラーマンとコチョウランさん』), broadcast January 6, 2026, setting Okamoto as the third voice of the character.)	
Currypanman	Michiyo Yanagisawa	
Shokupanman	Sumi Shimamoto	
Melonpanna	Mika Kanai	
Rollpanna	Miina Tominaga	
Creampanda	Miki Nagasawa	
SLman	Tomohiro Nishimura	
Poppo-chan	Haruka Kudō	
Kurayamiman	Tesshō Genda	
Mimi-sensei	Roko Takizawa	
Chibizou-kun	Chika Sakamoto	
Kabao-kun	Kōichi Yamadera	
Pyonkichi	Eriko Hara	
Nekomi	Akane Yamaguchi	
Moldyrunrun	Chika Sakamoto	
Moo-san	Shizuyo Yamasaki	
Carrot-san	Ryōtarō Kan	
Chapon	Yū Aoi	
Shidoro	Chiyo Terada	
Modoro	Chiyo Terada	
Rabbit Girl	Akane Yamaguchi	
Robot No. 2	Satoshi Mukai; Takahiro Ogata	
Mud Dadandan	Kōichi Yamadera	

== Production ==
The film was announced on February 6, 2025, which would mark the 106th anniversary of Takashi Yanase's birth. Aside from the title reveal, an illustrated teaser visual done by Yanase Studio was also revealed. The film's theme centers around "love and courage" (similar to how it is decipted in the show's theme song) as well as the meaning of birth. Yū Aoi was announced as the voice actress for Chapon a week later on February 17. The film's crew, including its director and screenwriter were revealed on March 7 of that year. This is the second Anpanman film to be directed by Hashimoto following 2023's Roboly and the Warming Present.
