= Kōsuke Okamoto =

Japanese actor (born 1988)

- 岡本 幸輔
- Born: June 19, 1988 (age 38); Osaka Prefecture, Japan
- Occupations: Stage actor, voice actor
- Years active: 2010–present
- Agent: 81 Produce

Kōsuke Okamoto (岡本 幸輔, Okamoto Kōsuke; born June 19, 1988) is a Japanese stage actor affiliated with 81 Produce.

== Biography ==
Okamoto was born in Osaka Prefecture on June 19, 1988.

His hobbies and special skills include cuisine, mahjong, karaoke, fishing, baseball, impersonating and tongue twisters.

In 2014, he joined Dramatic Company as a 10th generation trainee, becoming an associate member in 2017.

In May 2018, Okamoto officially joined 81 Produce and started his career as a voice actor.

== Filmography ==
=== 2018 ===
- Let's Go! Anpanman
- Kiratto Pri Chan

=== 2019 ===
- Phantasy Star Online 2: Episode Oracle

=== 2020 ===
- 22/7
- Dorohedoro
- Doraemon

=== 2021 ===
- The Promised Neverland
- Back Arrow
- Idoly Pride
- Redo of Healer
- Crayon Shin-chan
- Scarlet Nexus
- Great Detective Conan
- The Vampire Dies in No Time

=== 2022 ===
- Orient
- Delicious Party Pretty Cure
- Salaryman's Club
- Skeleton Knight in Another World
- Lycoris Recoil
- Utawarerumono: Mask of Truth
- To Your Eternity
- Yo-kai Watch: Reborn
- Management of a Novice Alchemist

=== 2023 ===
- Ningen Fushin: Adventurers Who Don't Believe in Humanity Will Save the World
- Vinland Saga
- Dead Mount Death Play
- The Café Terrace and Its Goddesses
- Sacrificial Princess and the King of Beasts
- Mamekichi Mameko – The Daily Life of a NEET
- Zom 100: Bucket List of the Dead
- Helck
- Mix: Meisei Story Season 2: Our Second Summer, Beyond the Sky
- Power of Hope: PreCure Full Bloom
- Hypnosis Mic: Division Rap Battle: Rhyme Anima+
- The 100 Girlfriends Who Really, Really, Really, Really, Really Love You
- Undead Unluck
- The Rising of the Shield Hero Season 3
- The Idolmaster Million Live!

=== 2024 ===
- Doctor Elise
- The Apothecary Diaries
- Tales of Wedding Rings
- Spice and Wolf: Merchant Meets the Wise Wolf
- The Many Sides of Voice Actor Radio
- Train to the End of the World
- Laid-Back Camp Season 3
- 2.5 Dimensional Seduction

=== 2025 ===
- Magic Maker
- Trillion Game
- Me and the Alien MuMu
- Once Upon a Witch's Death
- Gachiakuta
- Dr. Stone Science Future
- May I Ask for One Final Thing?
- The Blue Wolves of Mibu

=== 2026 ===
- Fist of the North Star
- Kill Blue
- Nippon Sangoku
- Agents of the Four Seasons
- Drops of God
- Snowball Earth

=== Theatrical animation ===
List of voice performances in theatrical animation
Year	Title	Role	Notes	Source
2020	Poupelle of Chimney Town	Toppo		
2022	Let's Go! Anpanman: Dororin and the Transformation Carnival	Ghost Catfish, Ghost Tree, Child Ghost		
2023	Let's Go! Anpanman: Roborii and the Warming Present	Robot Baikinman		
2024	Let's Go! Anpanman: Baikinman and Lulun in the Picture Book	Mokkuri, Takoyakiman, Wood Dadandan, Wooden Baikin Robot		
2025	Detective Conan: One-eyed Flashback	Guard		
2025	Let's Go! Anpanman: Chapon's Hero!	Horrorman		
2025	Virgin Punk: Clockwork Girl	Doctor		

=== Original video animation (OVA) ===
- Strike the Blood: Disappearing Holy Lance Arc
