= Anpanman: Apple Boy and Everyone's Hope =

2014 film by Jun Kawagoe

- Theatrical release poster
- Japanese: それいけ！アンパンマン りんごぼうやと みんなの願い
- Directed by: Jun Kawagoe
- Screenplay by: Shōji Yonemura
- Based on: Anpanman by Takashi Yanase
- Produced by: Toshio Nakatani; Yusuke Kubo; Megumi Hoshino; Yuka Oshima
- Starring: Keiko Toda; Ryūsei Nakao; Mao Inoue; Keisuke Okada
- Music by: Taku Izumi; Hiroaki Kondo
- Production companies: Anpanman Project; TMS Entertainment
- Distributed by: Tokyo Theatres
- Release date: July 5, 2014
- Running time: 45 minutes
- Country: Japan
- Language: Japanese
- Box office: ¥400 million (Japan)

Soreike! Anpanman: Ringo Bōya to Minna no Negai (それいけ！アンパンマン りんごぼうやと みんなの願い) is a 2014 Japanese anime children's fantasy adventure film part of the Anpanman film series and directed by Jun Kawagoe. It was released on July 5, 2014. This film is dedicated to Takashi Yanase, the author of the original Anpanman book series who died on October 13, 2013. The movie was dubbed into English as Anpanman: Apple Boy and Everyone's Hope and was released on Tubi on April 15, 2021. It was later moved to Netflix on September 19, 2025, alongside 10 other Anpanman movies with a new English dub.

== Cast ==
Cast
Role	Japanese (2014)	English	
Role	Japanese (2014)	Macias Group (2021)	Igloo Music (2025)
Anpanman	Keiko Toda	Ghia Burns	Ell
Baikinman	Ryuusei Nakao	Jason Kesser	Andrew Russell
Apple Boy	Mao Inoue	Sarah Bartels	Mary Kate Wiles
Majora	Keisuke Okada	Witchteria	
Majora	Keisuke Okada	Paul Louis Mueller	
Shokupanman	Sumi Shimamoto	Bread Head Man	
Shokupanman	Sumi Shimamoto	Alex Machado	Nikko Austen Smith
Currypanman	Michiyo Yanagisawa	Paul Louis Mueller	Anna Ishida
Creampanda	Miki Nagasawa	Natalie Perlin	Mary Kate Wiles
Melonpanna	Mika Kanai	Amanda Lopez	Cori Baik
Uncle Jam	Hiroshi Masuoka	Barry Tarallo	Todd Haberkorn
Butterko	Rei Sakuma	Batako	
Butterko	Rei Sakuma	Elaine Flores	Rina Hoshino
Cheese (grunts)	Kouichi Yamadera	Clay Cartland	Lucien Dodge
Dokin-chan	Hiromi Tsuru	Dokeen	
Dokin-chan	Hiromi Tsuru	Krystal Valdes	Cristina Vee
Horrorman	Kaneta Kimotsuki	Horror	
Horrorman	Kaneta Kimotsuki	Hernán Chavarro	Ryan Garcia
Hamburger Kid	Yuuji Mitsuya	Óscar Cheda	Teddy Matthews
Pickles the Horse (grunts)	Kouichi Yamadera		
SL Man	Tomohiro Nishimura	Jason Kesser	
Kuutan the Whale	Keiko Yamamoto	Jorge Barranco	
Ringo-chan	Yuriko Yamamoto	Appleena	
Ringo-chan	Yuriko Yamamoto	Olivia Cruz	
Miss Mimi	Roko Takizawa	Mauriette Chayeb	Erin Yvette
Chibizou	Chika Sakamoto	Olivia Cruz	Kelly Baskin
Pyon	Eriko Hara	Paula Barros	
Usako	Hiromi Nakamura	Krystal Valdes	
Kaba		Jorge Barranco	Brad Norman
Rot-rot		Clay Cartland	
Male Appleland Resident	Tsunehisa Fujii	Óscar Cheda	
Female Appleland Resident	Haruna Gotou	Alisha Todd	

== Box office ==
The film grossed ¥71.5 million during its first weekend in Japan. The film went on to gross over ¥400 million ($3.78 million) in Japan.
