= Anpanman: Baikinman and Lulun in the Picture Book =

2024 film by Jun Kawagoe

- Theatrical release poster
- Japanese: それいけ! アンパンマン ばいきんまんとえほんのルルン
- Directed by: Jun Kawagoe
- Screenplay by: Shōji Yonemura
- Based on: Anpanman by Takashi Yanase
- Starring: Keiko Toda; Ryūsei Nakao; Aya Ueto; Takashi Okamura
- Music by: Taku Izumi; Hiroaki Kondo
- Production companies: TMS Entertainment; Anpanman Project
- Distributed by: Tokyo Theatres
- Release date: 28 June 2024
- Running time: 64 minutes
- Country: Japan
- Language: Japanese

Soreike! Anpanman: Baikinman to Ehon no Lulun (Japanese: それいけ! アンパンマン ばいきんまんとえほんのルルン) is a 2024 Japanese superhero fantasy anime film directed by Jun Kawagoe from a screenplay by Shoji Yonemura. Produced by TMS Entertainment, the film serves as the 35th entry in the Anpanman film series, itself based on the Anpanman book series by Takashi Yanase. The film stars the show's regular voice cast alongside guest stars such as actress Aya Ueto and comedian Takashi Okamura of Ninety-nine.

The film was released on June 28, 2024, by Tokyo Theatres.

== Plot ==
Baikinman, Anpanman's arch-nemesis wants to become a hero as he is magically trapped into a picture book. While there, he meets a fairy named Lulun and helps him defeat a giant elephant. As things don't go as planned, Lulun calls on Anpanman to stop him once again.

== Cast ==
- Keiko Toda as Anpanman
- Ryūsei Nakao as Baikinman
- Aya Ueto as Lulun
- Takashi Okamura as Rampaiging Elephant
- Koichi Yamadera as Uncle Jam, Cheese and Kabao
- Rei Sakuma as Batako
- Sumi Shimamoto as Shokupanman
- Michiyo Yanagisawa as Currypanman
- Mika Kanai as Melonpanna
- Miki Nagasawa as Creampanda
- Kazuki Yao as Horrorman
- Miina Tominaga as Dokin-chan
- Roko Takizawa as Teacher Mimi

Chiyo Terada from her music project Dreaming, which performs the songs for the Anpanman franchise reprises her role as Shidoro and Modoro, the latter originally played by her younger sister Kayo. Due to her death in 2019, Chiyo now plays both roles.

== Production ==
The film was announced on January 5, 2024. The film commemorates the 60th anniversary of the Anpanman book series that the show is based on. The film's guest cast as well as its director and screenwriter were revealed on February 29th of that year.

== Release ==
The film was released on June 28, 2024, by Tokyo Theatres.

=== Home media ===
The film was released on DVD in Japan on November 20, 2024, by VAP.

== Reception ==
The film ranked at #1 in the Japanese box office in terms of ticket sales as the film grossed over ¥170,000,000 million in its first week. The film became the highest-grossing film in the franchise as it earned over ¥670,000,000 million during the film's first 50 days in its Japanese theatrical run.
