= Michiyo Yanagisawa =

Japanese voice actress (born 1963)

- 柳沢三千代
- Born: July 26, 1963 (age 63); Osaka Prefecture, Japan
- Occupations: Voice actress; narrator
- Years active: 1980–present
- Agent: Aoni Production
- Known for: Let's Go! Anpanman as Currypanman
- Website: Official profile

Michiyo Yanagisawa (柳沢三千代, Yanagisawa Michiyo) (born July 26, 1963) is a Japanese voice actress and narrator affiliated with Aoni Production.

She is best known for her voice role as Currypanman on the long-running children's television anime series Let's Go! Anpanman.

== Biography ==
While enrolled in the Department of Theater at Nihon University's College of Arts, she joined theater company NOISE, led by Koharu Kisaragi.

In an interview with the Tokyo Medical Association's public relations magazine Genki ga Iine, she explained that she studied theater because she had originally dreamed of becoming an elementary school teacher and thought it could be applied to education, also sharing that her passion for expression grew through her theater troupe activities.

With encouragement from Kisaragi, who was also her mentor, she pursued a path as a voice actress after graduating from university and officially joined Aoni Production.

Since 1988, she has voiced Currypanman in the long-running television anime series Let's Go! Anpanman.

== Filmography ==
=== Television animation ===
- Saint Seiya (1986) – Tatsuya
- Let's Go! Anpanman (1988) – Currypanman
- Mobile Suit Victory Gundam (1993) – Brasta Jellines, Elischa Kransky
- Mobile Fighter G Gundam (1994) – Min
- Bonobono (1995) as Fennec Kitsune-kun
- Great Detective Conan (2000) – Kaneda Kanami (episode 214)
- Mobile Suit Gundam Seed (2002) – Erica Simmons
- Mobile Suit Gundam Seed Destiny (2004) – Erica Simmons

=== Theatrical animation ===
- Fuichin-san (2004) – Fuichin
- Let's Go! Anpanman: Apple Boy and the Wishes For Everyone (2014) – Currypanman
- Let's Go! Anpanman: Baikinman and the Picture Book of Lulun (2024) – Currypanman
- Let's Go! Anpanman: Chapon's Hero! (2025) – Currypanman

=== Video games ===
- Bushido Blade (1997) – Mikado

=== Television drama ===
- Anpan (2025) – Buruburu (voice)

=== Tokusatsu ===
- Gekisou Sentai Carranger (1996) – LL Onene (voice)
