= Rei Sakuma =

Japanese actress (born 1965)

- 佐久間 レイ
- Born: Reiko Sakuma (佐久間 玲子); January 5, 1965 (age 61); Setagaya District, Tokyo, Japan
- Other name: Reiko Noda (野田 玲子) (marriage name)
- Occupations: Actress; voice actress; singer; narrator
- Years active: 1985–present
- Agent: Ōkina
- Notable credits: Ranma ½ as Shampoo; Let's Go! Anpanman as Batako; Onegai My Melody as My Melody; Azuki-chan as Yōko Sakakibara; New Mobile Report Gundam Wing: Endless Waltz as Mariemaia Khushrenada; Doraemon as Mini-Dora; Trotting Hamtaro as Mafurā-chan
- Spouse: Yū Mizushima (divorced)
- Children: 1
- Website: sakumarei.com

Rei Sakuma (佐久間 レイ, Sakuma Rei; born Reiko Sakuma (佐久間 玲子, Sakuma Reiko), January 5, 1965) is a Japanese actress, voice actress, singer and narrator from Setagaya District, Tokyo. She was formerly married to actor and talent Yū Mizushima.

She is best known in Japan for her role as the character Batako in the long running children's television anime series Let's Go! Anpanman, while her most famous voice role in the English-speaking world is as the Chinese Amazon character Shampoo in Ranma ½.

Other popular voice roles of hers include Yōko Sakakibara in Azuki-chan, Mariemaia Khushrenada in New Mobile Report Gundam Wing: Endless Waltz, My Melody in Onegai My Melody, Mini-Dora in Doraemon and Mafurā-chan in Trotting Hamtaro.

== Biography ==
Sakuma was born on January 5, 1965 in Setagaya District, Tokyo, Japan. Her mother was a shamisen teacher, and at a young age she grew up surrounded by the sounds of traditional Japanese instruments. Having chosen ballet, piano, and the like, she learned them, and enjoyed performing acting, singing, and dancing with them. At the time, the view from the wings, the cluttered backstage, the scent of the dressing rooms, and the lined-up costumes made her get so excited that her blood felt like it was rushing backward. Ballet recitals were also frequently held at the Setagaya Public Hall.

As a high school student at Tokyo Bunka High School, she was a member of the school's softball club where they would play softball. During practice one day however, she ended up breaking a bone and ended up having to watch everybody else practice without her every day. She thought of her other dream then at the time, "I will go to the world of acting" and "When I grow up, I will live true to that exciting heart." But since she didn't know anyone in the industry, the only "entrance" that she thought even an amateur could get into was an audition program for young people, so applied for the Nippon Television talent show Star Tanjō! and passed the audition. She learned for the first time that the show was meant for aspiring singers, which is why it included her supposed feelings written as, "it seems Mr. Sakuma just wanted to be an idol singer." She never had aimed to become a singer, so struggled, feeling like she had "jumped onto a train heading in the wrong direction", and since it was never going to fit her, she thought, "I got in through the wrong door!" The future she had vaguely dreamed of was "loving the stage, and wanting to express oneself in every possible form, such as words, song, acting, and writing."

At the 36th Grand Championship of Star Tanjō!, Sakuma did not receive any scout offers from talent agencies or record companies, but won the Judges' Encouragement Award, giving her the rights to challenge the Grand Championship again, with Japanese singer Yukie Kawakami ultimately winning the Grand Prix that round. At the time, she couldn't bring herself to say, 'I took the wrong ride!" She was given a second chance by the judges and competed in the 38th Grand Championship of Star Tanjō!, but lost again to Akina Nakamori. She reflected on these events, saying, "In my teens, I took the wrong train in life and made a massive, humiliating failure with my name and face exposed to all of Japan on television." However thanks to having a connection to Akira Saiga, someone who was a benefactor of hers and who had lived in the neighborhood, she was set to start her acting career. Things took a turn when she was scouted by a talent agency, and after doing training, she officially made her entertainment industry debut in October 1982 in the NHK music program Let's Go Young.

Initially, during her days as an idol singer, she was with Saiga Kikaku, but ended up transferring to Bond later on in 1983. Following this transition, she changed her stage name from "Rei Sakuma" (佐久間レイ) to "Rei Sakuma" (佐久間 麗), with her nickname around that time being "Gako" (ガー子).

In February 1983, she made her record debut with "Hamidashi Tenshi" with Tokuma Japan Communications and appeared on NHK's Let's Go Young as a member of the "Sundays" group. She wound up feeling overwhelmed from pushing herself hard, and couldn't enjoy or fit in at all, making her think, "My heart is screaming that this is wrong, I'm going to quit."

After taking a brief hiatus from entertainment activities, someone recommended Sakuma to try her hand at being a voice actress upon her return. She casually took the suggestion and made her voice acting debut in 1985 as the voice of Pierce in the television anime Button Nose. At the time, she had no experience as a voice actress and learned various things while on the job. Her efforts were sustained by her observing and gathering experiences from senior voice actors and people she had passed by on the street.

She famously has appeared in every episode of the long running television anime Let's Go! Anpanman as the voice of Batako. Due to the sudden death of Hiromi Tsuru on November 16, 2017, Sakuma temporarily stepped in to voice the role of Dokin-chan for the show's Christmas special that year, as Tsuru hadn't recorded the character's dialogue at the time of her death. It was the only time she served as Tsuru's replacement, as Miina Tominaga, who also regularly voices the character of Rollpanna in the series, was officially cast as the character's new voice actress starting in January 2018.

Around the time Sakuma voiced the role of Jiji in Kiki's Delivery Service, the title of "voice actor" began to be attached to her name, which she thought, "it sounds like a cool artisan title." She added, "Playing Jiji felt like I was somewhat accepted as a voice actor."

Sakuma was previously affiliated with 81 Produce. As of August 2018, she is affiliated with her own agency, Ōkina.

== Personality ==
Sakuma often portrays the role of a "precocious, slightly eccentric" girl.

She has listed playing the piano and shamisen as her special skills.

For the role of Shampoo in Ranma ½, Sakuma developed a unique intonation for her vocal performance of the character after being instructed to remove "aruyo" and similar catchphrases from her speech that were present in the original manga.

== Filmography ==
=== Television animation ===
List of voice performances in television animation
| Year | Title | Role | Notes | Source |
|---|---|---|---|---|
| 1985 | Button Nose | Pierce | Debut television anime role | |
| 1986 | Konna Ko Iru Kana | Pero | | |
| 1986 | The Story of Pollyanna, Girl of Love | Sadie Dean | Eps. 43-51 | |
| 1986 | Mobile Suit Gundam ZZ | Rutina Revin | Eps. 42-43 | |
| 1987 | Tales of Little Women | Amy March | | |
| 1987 | Uchūsen Sagittarius | Mina | | |
| 1987 | Anmitsu Hime | Jelly Beans | | |
| 1987 | Ultra B | Doji | | |
| 1987 | Mami the Psychic | Kaori Hana, Akiko, Helper, Hiroko | Kaori Hana in Ep. 33 | |
| 1988 | Little Lord Fauntleroy | Catherine | | |
| 1988 | F | Ruiko | | |
| 1988 | City Hunter 2 | Azusa Nakayama | Ep. 5 | |
| 1988 | Let's Go! Anpanman | Batako, Dokin-chan | Substitute voice of Dokin-chan | |
| 1988 | Oishinbo | Noriko Hanamura, Vendor A, Woman A, Customer F | | |
| 1989 | The Adventures of Hutch the Honeybee | Roza, Lily, Mill | | |
| 1989 | Ranma ½ | Shampoo | | |
| 1989 | Miracle Giants Dome-kun | Andy/Melody Patricia Norman | | |
| 1989 | Parasol Henbē | Izumi / Abuko | | |
| 1989 | Dash! Yonkuro | Rinko Sumeragi | | |
| 1989 | Fujiko F. Fujio Anime Special: SF Adventure – T-P Bon | Ream Stream | Television special | |
| 1989 | Time Travel Tondekeman | Princess Shalala, Dramusko | | |
| 1990 | The Laughing Salesman | Taiko Tsumanari | Ep. 15 | |
| 1990 | Madö King Granzört | Aya | Eps. 38-39 | |
| 1990 | Moomin | Little My, Mymble's daughter | | |
| 1990 | Magical Angel Sweet Mint | Elena | Ep. 6 | |
| 1990 | Let's Go! Anpanman: Save the Southern Sea! | Batako | Television special | |
| 1990 | Obocchama-kun | Chin Chin | Ep. 76 | |
| 1990 | Idol Angel Yokoso Yoko | Mika | Ep. 33 | |
| 1991 | Delightful Moomin Family: Adventure Diary | Little My | | |
| 1991 | The Two Lottes | Lotte Körner | Lead role | |
| 1992 | Manga Nihonshi | Shizuka Gozen | | |
| 1992 | Mama Is Just a Fourth Grade Pupil | Nurse | Ep. 23 | |
| 1992 | Oishinbo: Ultimate VS Supreme | Noriko Hanamura | Television special | |
| 1993 | Miracle Girls | Rumiko Daijōji | | |
| 1993 | Nekketsu Saikyō Go-Saurer | Sayoko Tachibana | | |
| 1993 | Let's Go! Anpanman: Uncle Jam Disappeared | Batako | Television special | |
| 1993 | Oishinbo: The Japan-U.S. Rice War | Noriko Hanamura | Television special | |
| 1994 | Doraemon | Mini-Dora | Second voice; Eps. 1291-1787 | |
| 1994 | Let's Play! Hello Kitty | Rei | | |
| 1994 | Crayon Shin-chan | Himeko Himeno | Ep. 108 | |
| 1994 | Tsuyoshi Shikkari Shinasai | Akemi | Eps. 95 and 105 | |
| 1995 | Azuki-chan | Yōko Sakakibara, Kaoru's mother | | |
| 1995 | Alice Tanteikyoku | Alice | Lead role | |
| 1995 | Wedding Peach | Marilyn | Ep. 18 | |
| 1995 | Let's Go! Anpanman: The Christmas of the Yarn Castle | Batako | Television special | |
| 1996 | The Life and Adventures of Santa Claus | Ion, Ryl A, Karen, Aeon | Ion in Eps. 1-3, 5, 16, Ryl A in Ep. 2, Karen in Ep. 16, Aeon in Ep. 24 | |
| 1996 | Let's Go! Anpanman: Anpanman and Pirate Lobster | Batako | Television special | |
| 1997 | Rescue Warrior Nanosaver | Momoko Azuchi | | |
| 1997 | Hakugei: Legend of the Moby Dick | Lisa | | |
| 1997 | Pokémon | Sakura, Yuki, Lisa | Yuki in Eps 28, 169, Lisa in Ep. 205 | |
| 1997 | Great Detective Conan | Yoshino Satomi, Kikuyo Kasama, Akiko Shiina | Yoshino in Ep. 74, Kikuyo in Eps 228-229, Akiko in Ep. 369 | |
| 1998 | Bomberman B-Daman Bakugaiden | Red Bomber | | |
| 1998 | Vampire Princess Miyu | Kasumi Kimihara | Ep. 19 | |
| 1998 | The Mysterious Cities of Gold | Zia | 1998 Japanese re-dub; the original role in 1982 was performed by Mami Koyama | |
| 1998 | Trigun | Marianne | Ep. 2 | |
| 1998 | Sentimental Journey | Makihara Tsugumi | Ep. 4 | |
| 1998 | Pani Poni | Cathy | | |
| 1998 | Kurogane Communication | Kanato's mother | | |
| 1999 | Bomberman B-Daman Bakugaiden V | Red Bomber | | |
| 1999 | Susie and Marvy | Ineko, Norma, Hana-chan | | |
| 1999 | Cardcaptor Sakura | The Dark, The Light | | |
| 1999 | Magic User's Club | Mizuha Miyama | | |
| 1999 | Infinite Ryvius | Neya | | |
| 1999 | Seraphim Call | Ayaka Rindoh | | |
| 2000 | Shūkan Storyland | Boy, Midori Morishima, Additional voices | | |
| 2000 | Gregory Horror Show | Angel Dog/Devil Dog | | |
| 2000 | Gate Keepers | Yōko Ono | Eps. 11 and 15 | |
| 2000 | Trotting Hamtaro | Mafurā-chan, Hiromi Haruna, Neteru-kun | Substitute voice of Neteru-kun | |
| 2000 | Mr. Digital Tokoro | Fumiko Tokoro (Okusama) | | |
| 2001 | Baby Felix | Majorina | Eps. 36-40, 63 | |
| 2001 | Najica Blitz Tactics | Dr. Ren | | |
| 2001 | Kasumin | Sakurajo Kasumi, Don, Mariko Shirakaba, Luna Sakakibara | First series | |
| 2001 | Captain Kuppa | Norma | | |
| 2001 | Hikaru no Go | Akiko Toya | | |
| 2002 | Please Teacher! | Konoha Edajima | | |
| 2002 | Jing: King of Bandits | Sherry | Eps. 3-4 | |
| 2002 | Tenchi Muyo! GXP | Funaho Masaki Jurai | | |
| 2002 | Kasumin | Sakurajo Kasumi | Second series | |
| 2002 | Hanada Shōnen Shi | Shizue | | |
| 2002 | Let's Go! Anpanman: The Flame of Courage and Christmas | Batako | Television special | |
| 2002 | Space Pirate Captain Herlock: The Endless Odyssey | Kei Yuki | | |
| 2003 | Kikō Sen'nyo Rouran | Shikai Sen'nyo | Eps. 10-12 | |
| 2003 | Pocket Monsters: Side Stories | Sakura (Kasumi's sister) | Eps. 9, 11, 16 | |
| 2003 | Galaxy Angel AA | Rebecca | | |
| 2003 | Pluster World | Mother of the Kametsuru Clan | | |
| 2003 | Kasumin | Sakurajo Kasumi | Third series | |
| 2003 | Requiem from the Darkness | Kikyou | Ep. 13 | |
| 2004 | Superior Defender Gundam Force | Mayor Margaret Gathermoon | | |
| 2004 | Pants Pankuro | Comingo | | |
| 2004 | Miracle! Panzo | Mamezō | | |
| 2004 | Mermaid's Forest | Misa | Eps. 12-13 | |
| 2004 | Monster | Barbara | Ep. 21 | |
| 2004 | Black Jack | Ritsuko Arima | Ep. 8 | |
| 2005 | Agatha Christie's Great Detectives Poirot and Marple | Edith | Ep. 31 | |
| 2005 | Onegai My Melody | My Melody | Lead role | |
| 2005 | Glass Mask | Sayoko Mizuki | | |
| 2005 | Pocket Monsters: Advanced Generation | Sakura | Ep. 409 | |
| 2005 | The Snow Queen | Seal, Actress Iida, Aunes | Seal in Eps. 10, 12, 13, 15, 20, 23, 26, 33-36, Actress Iida in Ep. 10, Aunes in Ep. 25 | |
| 2005 | Ginga Legend Weed | Sakura | Ep. 6 | |
| 2006 | Onegai My Melody: Kuru Kuru Shuffle | My Melody | Lead role | |
| 2006 | Hello Kitty Apple Forest Series | Fifi, Raiji | | |
| 2006 | Trotting Hamtaro Hai! | Mafurā-chan | | |
| 2006 | Ah! My Goddess: Flights of Fancy | Peorth | | |
| 2006 | Black Jack 21 | Maureen | | |
| 2006 | Atashin'chi | Sakata (Ai's mother) | | |
| 2006 | Kemonozume | Harumi Kamitsuki | | |
| 2006 | Super Robot Wars Original Generation: Divine Wars | Yukiko Date, Kuro | | |
| 2007 | Onegai My Melody Sukkiri♪ | My Melody | Lead role | |
| 2007 | Kishin Taisen Gigantic Formula | Tatyana Grigoriev | | |
| 2007 | Ah! My Goddess: Fighting Wings | Peorth | Television special | |
| 2008 | Onegai My Melody Kirara★ | My Melody | Lead role | |
| 2008 | Takane No Jitensha | Keiko | Television special | |
| 2008 | Doraemon | Pigomon, Chamii | Pigomon in Ep. 243, Chamii in Ep. 289 | |
| 2008 | Kyo Kara Maoh! | Isra | | |
| 2008 | Golgo 13 | Stella Glaston | Ep. 20 | |
| 2009 | Cooking Idol Ai! Mai! Main! | Mieco Hiiragi (Main's mother), Cricket | | |
| 2010 | Spellbound! Magical Princess Lilpri | Queen | | |
| 2010 | HeartCatch PreCure! | Haruna Tsukikage | | |
| 2010 | Jewelpet Twinkle | Ekanite | Ep. 29 | |
| 2010 | Super Robot Wars Original Generation: The Inspector | Kuro, Radha Bairaban | | |
| 2010 | A Certain Magical Index II | Lidvia Lorenzetti | | |
| 2011 | Trotting Hamtaro Dechu! | Mafurā-chan | | |
| 2011 | No. 6 | Karan | | |
| 2012 | Pretty Rhythm: Aurora Dream | Anna Takamine | Eps. 45, 49-50 | |
| 2012 | The Knight in the Area | Eiko Aizawa (Aizawa's mother) | | |
| 2012 | Is This a Zombie? of the Dead | Delusion Yū | Ep. 10 | |
| 2012–15 | Oshiri Kajiri Mushi | Tasuke-kun, Cherry | | |
| 2014–16 | PriPara | Laala's mom | | |
| 2015 | Pocket Monsters: XY | Yashio | | |
| 2015 | Mysterious Joker | Pandora Queen | Eps 24-25 | |
| 2016 | Rewrite | Rikako Kanbe | | |
| 2017 | The Ancient Magus' Bride | Morii | | |
| 2017 | Let's Go! Anpanman: Kokin-chan and the Christmas Gift | Batako, Dokin-chan | Substitute voice of Dokin-chan | |
| 2017 | Nintama Rantarō no Uchū Daibōken with Cosmic Front☆NEXT | Goddess of Creation | | |
| 2018 | Idol Time PriPara | Laala's mom | | |
| 2018 | Let's Go! Anpanman: Anpanman and the First Christmas Night | Batako | Television special | |
| 2019 | Pastel Memories | Scientist | Eps 11-12 | |
| 2019 | Pop Team Epic | Pipimi | Television special | |
| 2019 | Let's Go! Anpanman: Little Wolf-kun Who Became Santa | Batako | Television special | |
| 2020 | Sonic X | Momo | Ep. 69 | |
| 2020 | Let's Go! Anpanman: Save Santa! Christmas at the Ice Castle | Batako | Television special | |
| 2022 | Black Summoner | Mist | Eps 6 and 8 | |
| 2022 | Let's Go! Anpanman: The Little Santa's Smiley Christmas | Batako | Television special | |
| 2023 | Let's Go! Anpanman: Akachanman and Baikin Santa | Batako | Television special | |
| 2024–present | Ranma ½ | Shampoo | | |
| 2025 | Turkey! Time to Strike | Natsume | | |

=== Theatrical animation ===
List of voice performances in theatrical animation
| Year | Title | Role | Note | Source |
|---|---|---|---|---|
| 1988 | Pihyoro Ikka Kenzan! | Additional voice | | |
| 1988 | Fair, then Partly Piggy | Tama-chan | | |
| 1989 | Let's Go! Anpanman: The Shining Star's Tear | Batako | | |
| 1989 | Utsunomiko | Prince of the Universe | 6 years old | |
| 1989 | The Five Star Stories | Fatima Clotho | | |
| 1989 | My Melody's Little Red Riding Hood | Little Red Riding Hood (My Melody) | | |
| 1989 | Kiki's Delivery Service | Jiji | | |
| 1990 | Uncle Remodelling Course | Narration, Office Ladies | | |
| 1990 | Let's Go! Anpanman: Baikinman's Counterattack | Batako | | |
| 1991 | Let's Go! Anpanman: Fly! Fly! Chibigon | Batako | | |
| 1991 | Let's Go! Anpanman: Dokin-chan's Doki-Doki Calendar | Batako | Short film | |
| 1991 | Ranma ½: The Battle of Nekonron, China! A Battle to Defy the Rules! | Shampoo | | |
| 1992 | Let's Go! Anpanman: The Secret of Building Block Castle | Batako | | |
| 1992 | Let's Go! Anpanman: Anpanman and His Pleasant Friends | Batako | Short film | |
| 1992 | Waring Goldfish! The Movie | Gyopo | | |
| 1992 | Comet in Moominland | Little My | | |
| 1992 | Mobile Suit Gundam 0083: The Afterglow of Zeon | Nina Purpleton | | |
| 1993 | Doraemon: Nobita and the Tin Labyrinth | Mrs. Galion, Mini-Dora | | |
| 1993 | Let's Go! Anpanman: Nosshi the Dinosaur's Big Adventure | Batako | | |
| 1994 | Pom Poko | Additional voice | | |
| 1994 | Let's Go! Anpanman: The Lyrical Magical Witch's School | Batako | | |
| 1994 | Let's Go! Anpanman: Everyone Get Together! Anpanman World | Batako | Short film | |
| 1994 | Ranma ½: Super Indiscriminate Decisive Battle! Team Ranma vs. the Legendary Phoenix | Shampoo, Phoenix | | |
| 1995 | 2112: The Birth of Doraemon | Sewashi's mother | Short film | |
| 1995 | Elementalors | Tsuyuha | | |
| 1995 | Crayon Shin-chan: Unkokusai's Ambition | Snow Storm Ring | | |
| 1995 | Let's Go! Anpanman: Let's Defeat the Haunted Ship!! | Batako | | |
| 1995 | Azuki-chan | Yoko Sakakibara | | |
| 1996 | Doraemon: Nobita and the Galaxy Super-express | Car Sensor | | |
| 1996 | Violinist of Hameln | Sizer / Hawk King Sizer | | |
| 1996 | Let's Go! Anpanman: The Flying Picture Book and the Glass Shoes | Batako | | |
| 1996 | Let's Go! Anpanman: Baikinman and the 3-"Bai" Punch | Batako | Short film | |
| 1997 | The Doraemons: The Puzzling Challenge Letter of the Mysterious Thief Dorapin! | Mimimi, Mini-Doras | Short film | |
| 1997 | Let's Go! Anpanman: The Pyramid of the Rainbow | Batako | | |
| 1997 | Let's Go! Anpanman: We're Heroes | Batako | Short film | |
| 1998 | Let's Go! Anpanman: The Palm of the Hand to the Sun | Batako | | |
| 1998 | Let's Go! Anpanman: Anpanman and His Strange Friend | Batako | Short film | |
| 1998 | Gundam Wing: Endless Waltz Special Edition | Mariemaia Kushrenada | | |
| 1999 | The Doraemons: Funny Candy of Okashinana!? | Mini-Doras | Short film | |
| 1999 | Let's Go! Anpanman: When the Flower of Courage Opens | Batako | | |
| 1999 | Let's Go! Anpanman: Anpanman and Their Funny Friends | Batako | Short film | |
| 2000 | Doraemon: Nobita and the Legend of the Sun King | Mini-Doras | | |
| 2000 | A Grandmother's Recollections | Young Shizuka Minamoto | Short film | |
| 2000 | The Doraemons: Doki Doki Wildcat Engine! | Mini-Doras | Short film | |
| 2000 | Let's Go! Anpanman: The Tears of the Mermaid Princess | Batako | | |
| 2000 | Let's Go! Anpanman: Yakisobapanman and Blacksabodenman | Batako | Short film | |
| 2000 | Ah! My Goddess: The Movie | Peorth | | |
| 2001 | Dorami & Doraemons: Space Land's Critical Event! | Mini-Dora | Short film | |
| 2001 | Let's Go! Anpanman: Gomira's Star | Batako | | |
| 2001 | Let's Go! Anpanman: The Amazing Naganegiman and Yakisobapanman | Batako | Short film | |
| 2001 | Trotting Hamtaro: Adventures in Ham-Ham Land | Mafurā-chan, Hiromi Haruna | | |
| 2002 | GUILSTEIN | Sheena | | |
| 2002 | Let's Go! Anpanman: The Secret of Roll and Laura's Floating Castle | Batako | | |
| 2002 | Let's Go! Anpanman: Tuna Maki-chan and Gold Kamameshidon | Batako | Short film | |
| 2002 | Trotting Hamtaro: The Captive Princess | Mafurā-chan | | |
| 2003 | Detective Conan: Crossroad in the Ancient Capital | Kayo Ichi | | |
| 2003 | Let's Go! Anpanman: Ruby's Wish | Batako | | |
| 2003 | Let's Go! Anpanman: The Amazing Naganegiman and Princess Doremi | Batako | Short film | |
| 2003 | Trotting Hamtaro: Miracle in Aurora Valley | Mafurā-chan | | |
| 2004 | Let's Go! Anpanman: Nyanii of the Country of Dream Cats | Batako | | |
| 2004 | Let's Go! Anpanman: Tsukiko and Shiratama ~Heart-racing Dancing~ | Batako | Short film | |
| 2004 | Trotting Hamtaro: The Mysterious Oni Picture Book Tower | Mafurā-chan | | |
| 2005 | Let's Go! Anpanman: Happy's Big Adventure | Batako | | |
| 2005 | Let's Go! Anpanman: Princess Snow-Black and Popular Baikinman | Batako | Short film | |
| 2006 | Let's Go! Anpanman: Dolly of the Star of Life | Batako | | |
| 2006 | Let's Go! Anpanman: Kokin-chan and the Blue Tears | Batako | Short film | |
| 2006 | Gunbuster vs. Diebuster | Kazumi "Onee-sama" Amano | | |
| 2007 | Let's Go! Anpanman: Purun of the Bubble Ball | Batako | | |
| 2007 | Let's Go! Anpanman: Horrorman and Hora-horako | Batako | Short film | |
| 2007 | Cinnamon The Movie | Cappuccino | | |
| 2008 | Crayon Shin-chan: Fierceness That Invites Storm! The Hero of Kinpoko | Chitai | | |
| 2008 | Let's Go! Anpanman: Rinrin the Fairy's Secret | Batako | | |
| 2008 | Let's Go! Anpanman: Hiyahiyahiyarico and Babu-Babu-Baikinman | Batako | Short film | |
| 2009 | Doraemon: The New Record of Nobita's Spaceblazer | Chamii | | |
| 2009 | Evangelion: 2.0 You Can (Not) Advance | Operator | | |
| 2009 | Let's Go! Anpanman: Dadandan and the Twin Stars | Batako | | |
| 2009 | Let's Go! Anpanman: Baikinman VS Baikinman!? | Batako | Short film | |
| 2010 | Let's Go! Anpanman: Blacknose and the Magical Song | Batako | | |
| 2010 | Let's Go! Anpanman: Run! The Exciting Anpanman Grand Prix | Batako | Short film | |
| 2011 | Let's Go! Anpanman: Rescue! Kokorin and the Star of Miracles | Batako | | |
| 2011 | Let's Go! Anpanman: Sing and Play! Anpanman and the Treasure in the Forest | Batako | Short film | |
| 2012 | Let's Go! Anpanman: Revive Banana Island | Batako | | |
| 2012 | Let's Go! Anpanman: Rhythm and Play! Anpanman and the Strange Parasol | Batako | Short film | |
| 2012 | Onegai My Melody: Yū & Ai | My Melody | Short film | |
| 2012 | Takashi Yanase Theater: Hal's Flute | Rabbit | | |
| 2012 | Takashi Yanase Theater: Anpanman's Birthday | Batako | | |
| 2013 | Let's Go! Anpanman: Fly! The Handkerchief of Hope | Batako | | |
| 2013 | Let's Go! Anpanman: Fun for Everyone! Anpanman and the Mischievous Ghosts | Batako | Short film | |
| 2014 | Let's Go! Anpanman: Apple Boy and the Wishes For Everyone | Batako | | |
| 2014 | Let's Go! Anpanman: Playtime for Everyone! Kokin-chan Has Become Mum!? | Batako | Short film | |
| 2015 | Let's Go! Anpanman: Mija and the Magic Lamp | Batako | | |
| 2015 | Let's Go! Anpanman: Sing and Rhythm! Anpanman Summer Festival | Batako | Short film | |
| 2015 | Wake Up, Girls! Beyond the Bottom | | | |
| 2016 | PriPara: Everyone's Longing! Let's Go PriParis! | Laala's mom | | |
| 2016 | Let's Go! Anpanman: Nanda and Runda of the Toy Star | Batako | | |
| 2017 | Let's Go! Anpanman: Bulbul's Big Treasure Hunt Adventure | Batako | | |
| 2018 | Let's Go! Anpanman: Shine! Kurun and the Star of Life | Batako | | |
| 2019 | Let's Go! Anpanman: Sparkle! Princess Vanilla of the Land of Ice Cream | Batako | | |
| 2020 | A Whisker Away | Tamaki | | |
| 2021 | Let's Go! Anpanman: Fluffy Fuwari and the Cloud Country | Batako | | |
| 2021 | Crayon Shin-chan: Shrouded in Mystery! The Flowers of Tenkazu Academy | Otsumun | | |
| 2022 | Let's Go! Anpanman: Dororin and the Transformation Carnival | Batako | | |
| 2023 | Let's Go! Anpanman: Roborii and the Warming Present | Batako | | |
| 2024 | Let's Go! Anpanman: Baikinman and the Picture Book of Lulun | Batako | | |
| 2025 | Let's Go! Anpanman: Chapon's Hero! | Batako | | |
| 2026 | Let's Go! Anpanman: Pantan and the Star of Promises | Batako | | |

=== Original video animation (OVA) ===
List of voice performances in original video animation
| Year | Title | Role | Notes | Source |
|---|---|---|---|---|
| 1988 | Gunbuster | Kazumi "Onee-sama" Amano | | |
| 1988 | Hades Project Zeorymer | Si Aen | | |
| 1989 | Angel Cop | Peace (Reika Yogawa) | | |
| 1989 | Blue Sonnet | Naru Haibara | | |
| 1990 | Guardian of Darkness | Motoko Takara | | |
| 1990 | Sol Bianca | April Bikirk | | |
| 1990 | Earthian | Blair | | |
| 1991 | Mobile Suit Gundam 0083: Stardust Memory | Nina Purpleton | | |
| 1993 | Bastard!! | Thunder Empress Arshes Nei | | |
| 1993 | Dragon Half | Vina | | |
| 1993 | JoJo's Bizarre Adventure | Holly Joestar | | |
| 1993 | New Dominion Tank Police | Leona Ozaki | | |
| 1994 | Combustible Campus Guardress | Aoi | | |
| 1994 | Cosmic Fantasy | Berga | | |
| 1995 | Tenchi Muyo! Ryo-Ohki | Funaho Masaki Jurai | | |
| 1996 | 801 T.T.S. Airbats | Lieutenant Jeger | | |
| 1996 | Mutant Turtles: Superman Legend | Crys-Mu / Dark Mu | | |
| 1997 | Agent Aika | Aika Sumeragi | | |
| 1997 | Gundam Wing: Endless Waltz | Mariemaia Khushrenada | | |
| 1997 | Night Warriors: Darkstalkers' Revenge | Morrigan Aensland | | |
| 2001 | Alien Nine | Principal Chisa Okada, Tomoya Hironaka | | |
| 2006 | Memories Off 5: Togireta Film | Mizuho Amamiya | | |
| 2007 | Ah! My Goddess: Fighting Wings | Peorth | | |
| 2011 | Ah! My Goddess: Together Forever | Peorth | | |

=== Video games ===
List of voice performances in video games
| Year | Title | Role | Notes | Source |
|---|---|---|---|---|
| 1997 | YU-NO: A Girl Who Chants Love at the Bound of this World | Mitsuki Ichijou | | |
| 2000 | Project Justice | Momo Karuizawa | | |
| 2000 | Mario Party 3 | Tumble | | |
| 2003 | Gregory Horror Show: Soul Collector | Angel Dog/Devil Dog | | |
| 2022 | Fitness Boxing: Fist of the North Star | Yuria | | |

=== Dubbing ===
==== Live-action ====
List of dub performances in live-action productions
| Title | Role | Source |
|---|---|---|
| A Better Tomorrow II | Jackie Sung (Emily Chu) | |
| Schindler's List | Helen Hirsch (Embeth Davidtz) | |
| Village of the Damned | Mara Chaffee (Lindsey Haun) | |
| The Wicker Man | Sister Willow Woodward (Kate Beahan) | |

==== Animation ====
List of dub performances in overseas animation
| Title | Role | Source |
|---|---|---|
| The Exploits of Moominpappa: Adventures of a Young Moomin | Little My and the Mymble's Daughter | |
| Moomins on the Riviera | Little My | |

=== Other ===
- Sanrio character ("Cinnamoroll") (Cappuccino)

=== Drama CD ===
List of drama CD performances
| Year | Title | Role | Label | Catalogue number | Source |
|---|---|---|---|---|---|
| 1998 | G Fantasy Comic CD Collection (2) FIREEMBLEM ◆Ankoku Ryuu to Hikari no Ken◆ Yakusoku no Tochi e | Sheeda | Enix | ECC-1003 | |

== Awards ==
| Year | Award | Category | Result | Ref. |
|---|---|---|---|---|
| 2026 | 20th Seiyu Awards | Kazue Takahashi Memorial Award | Honored | |
