= Anpanman =

Japanese media franchise

- Cover of the first book, released under the "Kinder Ohanashi Ehon Masterpiece Selection" imprint

アンパンマン
- Genre: Comedy, superhero
- Manga
- Written by: Takashi Yanase
- Published by: Froebel-kan
- Original run: 1973 – 2013
- Anime television series

Soreike! Anpanman
- Directed by: Akinori Nagaoka; Shunji Ōga
- Produced by: Hinta Fyumi
- Written by: Sakura Uzamacki
- Music by: Hiroaki Kondo; Taku Izumi
- Studio: TMS Entertainment (Note: Credited as Tokyo Movie Shinsha until 1995 and TMS-Kyokuichi until 1999)
- Original network: NNS (NTV)
- English network: IN: Pogo TV
- Original run: October 3, 1988 – present
- Episodes: 1,640 (3,450 segments)
- icon

Anpanman (アンパンマン; also stylized in hiragana as あんぱんまん) is a Japanese children's superhero picture book series and media franchise written by Takashi Yanase, running from 1973 until the author's death in 2013. The series has been adapted into an anime entitled Soreike! Anpanman (それいけ!アンパンマン; "Let's Go! Anpanman"), which is one of the most popular anime series among young children in Japan. The series follows the adventures of Anpanman, a superhero with an anpan (a red bean paste filled pastry) for a head, who protects the world from an evil anthropomorphic germ named Baikinman.

Heavily merchandised, the Anpanman characters appear on virtually every imaginable children's product in Japan, ranging from clothes and video games to toys and snack foods. The series spawned a short-lived spin-off show featuring one of the popular recurring characters on the show, Omusubiman. Anpanman overtook Hello Kitty as Japan's top-grossing character in 2002, and has remained the country's top-grossing character as of 2019. Anpanman has sold over 80 million books as of February 2019, and the franchise generated ¥4.5 trillion in total retail sales revenue by 2013. Works inspired by Anpanman include the manga and anime series One-Punch Man. It is one of the highest grossing media franchises of all time.

== Development ==
During the Second World War, Takashi Yanase faced starvation countless times, which made him dream about eating an anpan. This inspired the creation of Anpanman.

== Characters ==
In each episode, Anpanman fights with Baikinman and saves the day. He goes on daily patrols around the house of Uncle Jam. He is a symbol of justice, fighting for good every day. Anpanman has a long history, and new characters are frequently introduced, keeping the series fresh. In 2009, Anpanman was verified as a Guinness World Record Holder for the highest number of characters in an animated franchise, with a total of 1,768 characters appearing in the first 980 episodes of the TV series and the first 20 films.

=== Heroes ===
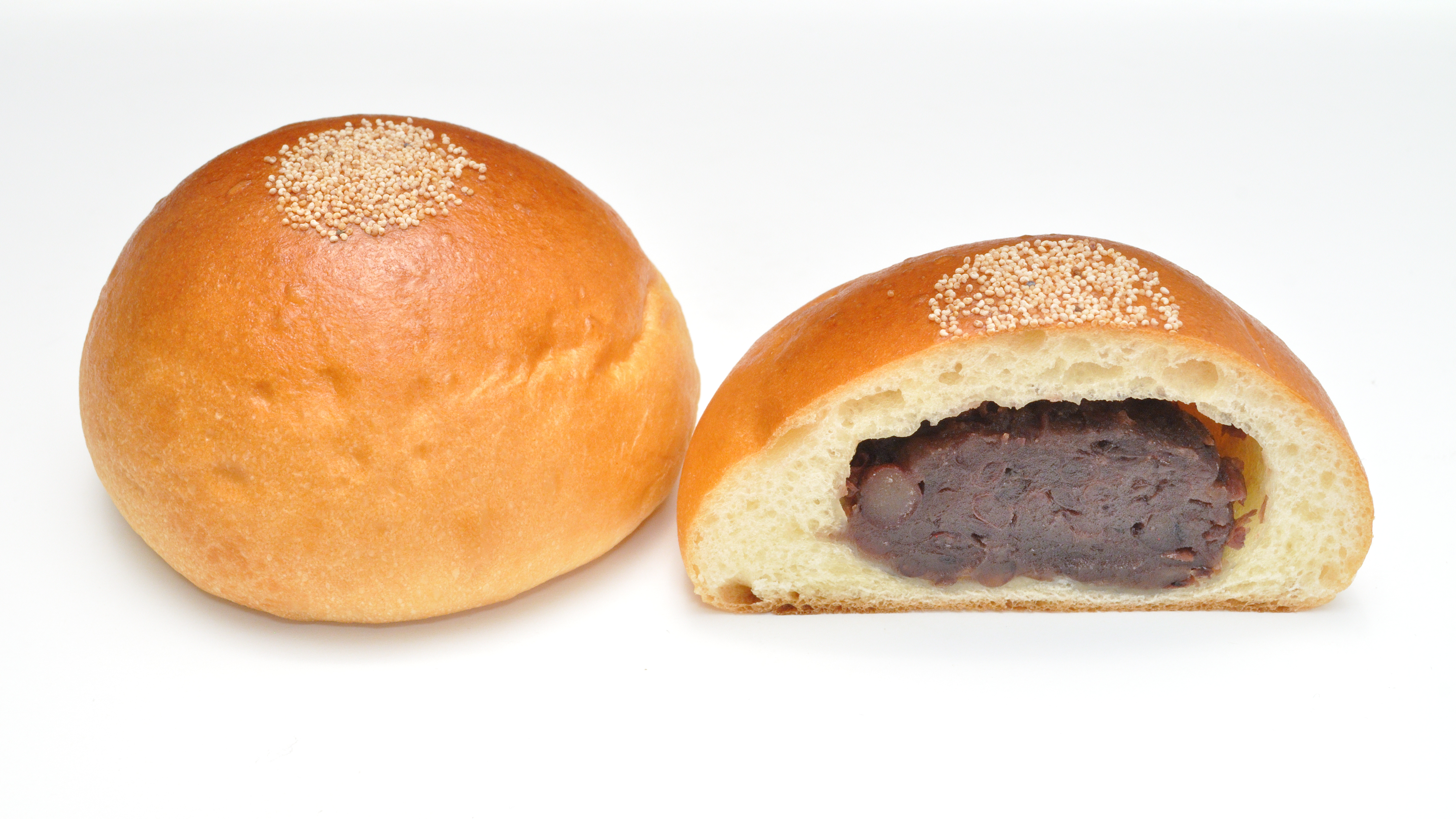
Anpan

Anpanman (アンパンマン, Anpanman)
Voiced by: Keiko Toda (Japanese); Ghia Burns (Tubi), Ell (Netflix) (English)
The main character of the anime, whose head is an Anpan made by Uncle Jam. His name comes from his being a man whose head is made of bread (Japanese: pan) that is filled with red bean paste (Japanese: anko) called an anpan. When translated into English, Anpanman means "Bean Bun Man." He doesn't need to eat or drink to sustain himself and has never been seen eating, as it is believed the bean jam in his head allows him to sustain himself in this manner. His weaknesses are water and anything else that makes his head dirty. In order to prevent his head from getting wet when underwater or in wet weather, he wears a bubble-like helmet to protect it. He regains his health and strength when Uncle Jam bakes him a new head and replaces the old head. Anpanman's damaged head, with his eyes turning into X's, flies off his shoulders once a new baked head replaces it. Anpanman was born when a shooting star landed in Uncle Jam's oven while he was baking an anpan. In movies and other media, the shooting stars that brought Anpanman to life were called "the stars of life". Anpanman has two special attacks; An-punch and An-kick (with stronger variations of both). When Anpanman comes across a starving character, he lets them eat a part of his head. This can also make him weaker and causes him to replace his head to regain his strength. He also has super hearing, which allows him to respond to anyone who calls his name out in distress, anywhere in the world.
Uncle Jam (ジャムおじさん, Jamu Ojisan)
Voiced by: Hiroshi Masuoka (1988–2019), Kōichi Yamadera (2019–present), Barry J Tarallo (Tubi), Todd Haberkorn (Netflix) (English)
The creator of Anpanman and a very kind baker. He is a skilled cook with knowledge of nearly everything in the world.
Batako-san (バタコさん, Batako-san)
Voiced by: Rei Sakuma (Japanese); Elaine Flores (Tubi), Rina Hoshino (Netflix) (English)
Assistant to Uncle Jam. She is dedicated and hard-working but prone to forgetting things. Her name literally translates to "Butter Girl." She makes and mends the capes of Anpanman and the other heroes in the story.
Cheese (チーズ, Chīzu)
Voiced by: Kōichi Yamadera (Japanese); Clay Cartland (Tubi), Lucien Dodge (Netflix) (English)
A dog that lives in Uncle Jam's bakery. In the manga, he became Anpanman's loyal friend after he saved his life. In the anime, a young Anpanman finds Cheese starving during his very first patrol, and gives him a part of his head to eat. Cheese tends to be an effective sidekick when he's around.
Currypanman (カレーパンマン, Karēpanman)
Voiced by: Michiyo Yanagisawa (Japanese); Paul Louis (Tubi), Anna Ishida (Netflix) (English)
Another of Anpanman's friends. His head is made from currypan, a pastry filled with red-hot curry. He is quick-tempered and hot-headed on the surface but gives way to a kind and sentimental interior. Tends to be the strongman of the trio. Wields the Curry-punch and Curry-kick, which are similar to the fighting techniques of Anpanman's other sidekicks. However, he can also use the hot curry concealed in his head as a weapon, using it to burn villains. He first appeared in episode 2b.
Shokupanman (しょくぱんまん, Shokupanman)
Voiced by: Sumi Shimamoto (Japanese); Alex Machado (Tubi), Nikko Austen Smith (Netflix) (English)
A friend of Anpanman. His head is made from sliced white bread (Japanese: shoku pan). He is handsome and level-headed and kind, but narcissistic. Tends to be the thinker of the trio. His job when not helping Anpanman is serving lunch to the schoolchildren. Dokin-chan has a crush on him. Wields the Shoku-punch and Shoku-kick, which are similar to Anpanman's fighting techniques. He also has a multi-functional delivery van known as the Shokupanman-go with many implements to help avoid trouble. He first appeared in episode 3b. In the Tubi and Netflix dubs, he is called Bread Head Man (spelled Breadhead-Man in the Netflix dub).
Melonpanna (メロンパンナ, Meronpan'na)
Voiced by: Mika Kanai (Japanese); Amanda Lopez (Tubi), Cori Baik (Netflix) (English)
Anpanman's friend. Her head is made from melon bread. She is extremely softhearted, being caring and sensitive, and is sometimes clever. When she's in trouble, she usually needs Anpanman or somebody else to save her, or if there is no one available, she calls out for her sister, Rollpanna. Sometimes she likes hanging out with Cheese. Her special attack, the Melo-Melo Punch, makes bad guys woozy with affection or awakens others from a deep sleep. She first appeared in episode 200.
Rollpanna (ロールパンナ, Rōrupan'na)
Voiced by: Miina Tominaga (Japanese); Benji Leon, Alisha Todd (English)
Melonpanna's older sister who has two hearts: A red one of goodness, and thanks to Baikinman, a blue one of evil. The sight of Anpanman can trigger her evil heart while the sight of Melonpanna can trigger her good one. She started out in the series as a loner at Baikinman's beck and call, but she broke from his power and wanders the world doing good deeds, but stays away from others for fear of what she would do if her blue heart is triggered. Her nickname is "The tragic heroine". Her weapon is a gymnastics ribbon, which she can use to wrap and slap up her enemies or cause tornadoes. She first appeared in episode 300.
Creampanda (クリームパンダ, Kurīmupanda)
Voiced by: Miki Nagasawa (Japanese); Natalie Perlin, Kate Clavelo (Tubi), Mary Kate Wiles (Netflix) (English)
The youngest of Anpanman's friends and the foster brother of Melonpanna and Rollpanna. He is six years old. His head is made from a cream bun and his eyes look like those of a panda's. Despite his immaturity and relative weakness as compared to Anpanman and his hero friends, he is courageous, protective of his friends, and has a "never give up" attitude. He has an immature character causes him to sometimes get into petty squabbles and competitions of one-upmanship with the other younger characters on the show. Because his head resembles a hand, he has a special headbutt attack called the "Guu-Choki-Punch" (Guu-Choki-Pa means Rock, Scissors, Paper in Japanese). Relatively powerful when it connects, it fails to connect more often than not. He first appeared in episode 469.

=== Villains ===
Baikinman (ばいきんまん, Baikinman)
Voiced by: Ryūsei Nakao (Japanese); Jason Kesser (Tubi), Andrew Russell (Netflix) (English)
The villain from the "Germ Planet" and is the leader of the Viruses. His Japanese name means "Bacteria Man". His ambition is to destroy Anpanman and spread bacteria all over the latter's world, yet he is perfectly content to play tricks, steal, and bully those weaker than him. He and Anpanman were born at the same time, making them physical representations of moral dualism. He has a weakness to soap, which shrinks him to the size of a fly. He constructs machines and thinks of intricate plans to counteract Anpanman's strength. His two famous phrases are his battle cry, "Ha-hi-hu-he-ho!" (based on the h-row of Japanese kana); and "Bye-baikiiin!", which he utters out whenever he's sent flying by Anpanman or another character. On the English TMS Entertainment website, he was called Bacteriaman. In the English Tubi and Netflix dubs, he keeps his original Japanese name. Baikinman and his nemesis, Anpanman combine in the view of the media expert Thomas Hoeren elements of Milton's Paradise Lost, Frankenstein and Star Trek.
Moldyrunrun (かびるんるん, Kabirunrun)
Baikinman's henchmen. They have the ability to rot Anpanman's head with mildew/mold (Japanese: kabi). They first appeared in episode 2a. In the English Tubi and Netflix dubs, they're called Rot-Rot.
Dokin-chan (ドキンちゃん)
Voiced by: Hiromi Tsuru (1988–2017), Rei Sakuma (2017 Christmas special), Miina Tominaga (2018–present), Krystal Valdes (Tubi), Cristina Vee (Netflix) (English)
Baikinman's female partner in crime. She is selfish, demanding, childish, and greedy, but sometimes shows kindness, as demonstrated by her crush on Shokupanman. Her Japanese name is a combination of "Doki", the Japanese onomatopoeia for a quickly beating heart, "baikin" (meaning "germ", also the case for Baikinman), and the diminutive/affectionate suffix "-chan". She first appeared in episode 13a. On the English TMS Entertainment website, she was called Spark, however in the English Tubi and Netflix dubs, she is called Dokeen.
Horrorman (ホラーマン, Horāman)
Voiced by: Kaneta Kimotsuki (1991–2016), Kazuki Yao (2017–2024), Kōsuke Okamoto (2025–present) (Japanese), Rio Chavarro (Tubi), Ryan Garcia (Netflix) (English)
A skeleton who often works with Baikinman and Dokin-chan. Although he seems scary on the outside, he is very weak, often falling to pieces, but can magically putting himself back together. He is neither a hero nor a villain. His special attack is the Bone Boomerang, where he takes off one of his bones and throws it. He is in love with Dokin-chan and often stalks her. He first appeared in Fly! Fly! Chibigon. In the English Tubi and Netflix dubs, he is called Horror.
Kokin-chan (コキンちゃん)
Voiced by: Otoha (2006), Aya Hirano (2007–present) (Japanese), Lia Rodriguez (English)
Dokin-chan's younger sister who can cry fake tears to make nearby people cry for no reason. She has a rivalry with her sister, mostly over their shared love for Shokupanman. Sometimes, she is not evil and helps Anapanman and the others. She first appeared in the 2006 animated short, Kokin-chan and the Blue Tears. In the English Tubi and Netflix dubs, she is called Coreen.

== Media ==
=== Picture books ===
The Anpanman picture book series debuted in October 1973. Froebel-kan has published over 150 picture books under different series labels consisting of a varying amount of picture books. Takashi Yanase wrote and illustrated the picture books until 2013, following his retirement from his career and eventual death.

=== Manga ===
Takashi Yanase created three different manga series based on the character.

- January 1975 – May 1976: Nekketsu Märchen Kaiketsu Anpanman (熱血メルヘン 怪傑アンパンマン)
  - Serialized in Sanrio's monthly poetry magazine Shi to Märchen (詩とメルヘン) for which Yanase was the editor-in-chief. Unlike all other iterations, this one is aimed at adults. The entire series is included in the box-set Yanase Takashi Taizen (やなせたかし大全), published in 2013 by Froebel-kan.
- September 1976 – July 1982: Anpanman (あんぱんまん / アンパンマン)
  - Serialized in Sanrio's monthly youth magazine Gekkan Ichigoehon (月刊いちごえほん). The series changed its title spelling from hiragana to katakana in January 1981 and ended when the magazine folded in July 1982. It remained commercially unavailable until 2016 when it was collected in its entirety into the volume Dare mo shiranai Anpanman (だれも知らないアンパンマン) by Fukkatsu Dotcom.
- January 1, 1990 – May 29, 1994: Tobe! Anpanman (とべ!アンパンマン)
  - A full color comic strip serialized in the Sunday edition of Yomiuri Shinbun. In 1991 Froebel-kan published a selection of strips into three bilingual volumes, marketing them as English learning tools for children age 3+. Unlike traditional tankoubon, these volumes are presented in a vertical "Garfield Format". The rest of the series run is currently commercially unavailable.

=== Anime ===
The first anime adaptation of Anpanman, consisting of a single episode, aired during Spring Break Children's Hiroba - Picture Book on NHK General TV on March 13, 1979. Like the early picture books, Anpanman's name in the title was written in hiragana (あんぱんまん) instead of katakana. The anime was narrated by Meiko Nakamura. Although the character designs were closer to the picture books released under the Kinder Picture Books label, the story and the worldview were almost the same as the second anime adaptation. This version is very popular in Greece.

The second anime adaptation of Anpanman, entitled Soreike! Anpanman (それいけ!アンパンマン, Let's Go! Anpanman), is produced by TMS Entertainment. Over 1300 episodes have aired on NTV since October 3, 1988. In April 2020, it was reported the voice recordings have had been put on hold due to the COVID-19 pandemic. On October 2, 2020, it was announced that the voice actors will now be recording lines in separate booths in order to minimize the spread of COVID-19. They will also be taking shifts.

An English dub, produced for Turner International aired on Pogo in India alongside a Hindi dub.

=== Full-length movies ===
There are currently a total of 36 full-length films based on the Soreike! Anpanman anime series. The films are also produced by TMS Entertainment and have been released in Japanese theaters every year since 1989, except in 2020, due to the pandemic. Since at least 1993, the films have been released concurrently with storybook versions written and illustrated by Takashi Yanase himself. Each movie has the same general plot - A person (usually a princess) comes from a foreign land. Baikinman unlocks some dark secret and controls a weapon or monster able to polymorph people. And with the help of the aforementioned person, Anpanman defeats the said weapon or monster. Sometimes the person dies but is brought back to life by a tearful song from the characters.

In May 2020, it was announced that production on the thirty-first Anpanman film Soreike! Anpanman: Fuwafuwa Fuwari to Kumo no Kuni (それいけ! アンパンマン ふわふわフワリーと雲の国, Let's Go! Anpanman: Fluffy Fuwari and the Cloud Country) had also been delayed due to the pandemic. The film was slated to be released on June 26, 2020. In June 2020, the film was delayed to 2021.

In 2020, Tubi announced plans to exclusively stream select Anpanman films in English and Spanish through a deal with TMS Entertainment. Initially confirmed to be 6 films, the catalogue was later expanded to 10 with the first, Apple Boy and Everyone's Hope, added to the streaming platform on April 15, 2021. Purun, The Soap Bubble followed in July 2021. 7 more films were added in September 2021, and Twinkle! Princess Vanilla of Ice Cream Land was added later that year. Dororin & the Transformation Carnival and Fluffy Flurry & the Land of the Clouds were initially slated for February 2024, but later added on May 10.

Ten select films have been added to Netflix on September 19, 2025, with a new English dub.

- March 11, 1989: Let's Go! Anpanman: The Shining Star's Tear (それいけ! アンパンマン キラキラ星の涙, Soreike! Anpanman Kirakira Boshi no Namida)
- July 14, 1990: Let's Go! Anpanman: Baikinman's Counterattack (それいけ! アンパンマン ばいきんまんの逆襲, Soreike! Anpanman Baikinman no Gyakushū)
- July 20, 1991: Let's Go! Anpanman: Fly! Fly! Chibigon (それいけ! アンパンマン とべ!とべ!ちびごん, Soreike! Anpanman Tobe! Tobe! Chibigon)
- March 14, 1992: Let's Go! Anpanman: The Secret of Building Block Castle (それいけ! アンパンマン つみき城のひみつ, Soreike! Anpanman Tsumiki-jō no Himitsu)
- July 17, 1993: Let's Go! Anpanman: Nosshi the Dinosaur's Big Adventure (それいけ! アンパンマン 恐竜ノッシーの大冒険, Soreike! Anpanman Kyōryū Nosshī no Daibōken)
- July 16, 1994: Let's Go! Anpanman: The Lyrical Magical Witch's School (それいけ! アンパンマン リリカル☆マジカルまほうの学校, Soreike! Anpanman Ririkaru Majikaru Mahō no Gakkō)
- July 29, 1995: Let's Go! Anpanman: Let's Defeat the Haunted Ship!! (それいけ! アンパンマン ゆうれい船をやっつけろ!!, Soreike! Anpanman Yūreisen o Yattsukero!!)
- July 13, 1996: Let's Go! Anpanman: The Flying Picture Book and the Glass Shoes (それいけ! アンパンマン 空とぶ絵本とガラスの靴, Soreike! Anpanman Soratobu Ehon to Garasu no Kutsu)
- July 28, 1997: Let's Go! Anpanman: The Pyramid of the Rainbow (それいけ! アンパンマン 虹のピラミッド, Soreike! Anpanman Niji no Piramiddo)
- July 25, 1998: Let's Go! Anpanman: The Palm of the Hand to the Sun (それいけ! アンパンマン てのひらを太陽に, Soreike! Anpanman Tenohira o Taiyō ni)
- July 24, 1999: Let's Go! Anpanman: When the Flower of Courage Opens (それいけ! アンパンマン 勇気の花がひらくとき, Soreike! Anpanman Yūki no Hana ga Hiraku Toki)
- July 29, 2000: Let's Go! Anpanman: The Tears of the Mermaid Princess (それいけ! アンパンマン 人魚姫のなみだ, Soreike! Anpanman Ningyohime no Namida)
- July 14, 2001: Let's Go! Anpanman: Gomira's Star (それいけ! アンパンマン ゴミラの星, Soreike! Anpanman Gomira no Hoshi)
- July 13, 2002: Let's Go! Anpanman: The Secret of Roll and Laura's Floating Castle (それいけ!アンパンマン ロールとローラうきぐも城のひみつ, Soreike! Anpanman Rōru to Rōra Ukigumo-jō no Himitsu)
- July 12, 2003: Let's Go! Anpanman: Ruby's Wish (それいけ! アンパンマン ルビーの願い, Soreike! Anpanman Rubī no Negai)
- July 17, 2004: Let's Go! Anpanman: Nyanii of the Country of Dream Cats (それいけ!アンパンマン 夢猫の国のニャニイ, Soreike! Anpanman Yume Neko no Kuni no Nyanii)
- July 16, 2005: Let's Go! Anpanman: Happy's Big Adventure (それいけ! アンパンマン ハピーの大冒険, Soreike! Anpanman Hapī no Daibōken) (Dubbed as Anpanman: The Adventure of Happie in English on September 10, 2021)
- July 15, 2006: Let's Go! Anpanman: Dolly of the Star of Life (それいけ! アンパンマン いのちの星のドーリィ, Soreike! Anpanman Inochi no Hoshi no Dōri) (Dubbed as Anpanman: Star-Spirited Dollie in English on September 10, 2021)
- July 14, 2007: Let's Go! Anpanman: Purun of the Bubble Ball (それいけ! アンパンマン シャボン玉のプルン, Soreike! Anpanman Shabondama no Purun) (Dubbed as Anpanman: Purun, the Soap Bubble in English on July 23, 2021)
- July 12, 2008: Let's Go! Anpanman: Rinrin the Fairy's Secret (それいけ! アンパンマン 妖精リンリンのひみつ, Soreike! Anpanman Yōsei Rinrin no Himitsu) (Dubbed as Anpanman: The Secret of Fairy Rin-Rin in English on September 10, 2021)
- July 4, 2009: Let's Go! Anpanman: Dadandan and the Twin Stars (それいけ! アンパンマン だだんだんとふたごの星, Soreike! Anpanman Dadandan to Futago no Hoshi)
- July 10, 2010: Let's Go! Anpanman: Blacknose and the Magical Song (それいけ! アンパンマン ブラックノーズと魔法の歌, Soreike! Anpanman Burakku Nōzu to Mahō no Uta) (Dubbed as Anpanman: Blacknose and the Magical Song in English on September 10, 2021)
- July 2, 2011: Let's Go! Anpanman: Rescue! Kokorin and the Star of Miracles (それいけ! アンパンマン すくえ!ココリンと奇跡の星, Soreike! Anpanman Sukue! Kokorin to Kiseki no Hoshi)
- July 7, 2012: Let's Go! Anpanman: Revive Banana Island (それいけ! アンパンマン よみがえれバナナ島, Soreike! Anpanman: Yomigaere Banana Shima) (Dubbed as Anpanman: Revive Banana Island in English on September 10, 2021)
- July 6, 2013: Let's Go! Anpanman: Fly! The Handkerchief of Hope (それいけ! アンパンマン とばせ!希望のハンカチ, Soreike! Anpanman: Tobase! Kibō no Handkerchief)
- July 5, 2014: Let's Go! Anpanman: Apple Boy and the Wishes For Everyone (それいけ！アンパンマン りんごぼうやとみんなの願い, Soreike! Anpanman: Ringo Bōya to Minna no Negai) (Dubbed as Anpanman: Apple Boy and Everyone's Hope in English on April 15, 2021)
- July 4, 2015: Let's Go! Anpanman: Mija and the Magic Lamp (それいけ! アンパンマン ミージャと魔法のランプ, Soreike! Anpanman: Mija to Mahō no Ranpu)
- July 2, 2016: Let's Go! Anpanman: Nanda and Runda of the Toy Star (それいけ! アンパンマン おもちゃの星のナンダとルンダ, Soreike! Anpanman: Omocha no Hoshi no Nanda to Runda) (Dubbed as Anpanman: Nanda and Runda from the Star of Toys in English on September 10, 2021)
- July 1, 2017: Let's Go! Anpanman: Bulbul's Big Treasure Hunt Adventure (それいけ! アンパンマン ブルブルの宝探し大冒険, Soreike! Anpanman: buruburu no takarasagashi dai bōken!)
- June 30, 2018: Let's Go! Anpanman: Shine! Kurun and the Star of Life (それいけ! アンパンマン かがやけ！クルンといのちの星, Soreike! Anpanman: Kagayake! Kurun to inochi no Hoshi) (Dubbed as Anpanman: Shine! Kulun And The Stars Of Life in English on September 10, 2021)
- June 28, 2019: Let's Go! Anpanman: Sparkle! Princess Vanilla of the Land of Ice Cream (それいけ! アンパンマン きらめけ! アイスの国のバニラ姫, Soreike! Anpanman: Kirameke! Ice no Kuni no Vanilla-hime) (Dubbed as Anpanman: Twinkle! Princess Vanilla of Ice Cream Land in English on November 12, 2021)
- June 25, 2021: Let's Go! Anpanman: Fluffy Fuwari and the Cloud Country (それいけ! アンパンマン ふわふわフワリーと雲の国, Soreike! Anpanman: Fuwafuwa Fuwari to Kumo no Kuni) (Dubbed as Anpanman: Fluffy Furry and The Land of Clouds in English on May 9, 2024)
- June 24, 2022: Let's Go! Anpanman: Dororin and the Transformation Carnival (それいけ!アンパンマン ドロリンとバケ〜るカーニバル, Soreike! Anpanman: Dororin to Bake〜ru Kānibaru) (Dubbed as Anpanman: Dororin and the Transformation Carnival in English on May 9, 2024)
- June 30, 2023: Let's Go! Anpanman: Roborii and the Warming Present (それいけ!アンパンマン ロボリィとぽかぽかプレゼント, Soreike! Anpanman: Roborii to Pokapoka Purezento)
- June 28, 2024: Let's Go! Anpanman: Baikinman and the Picture Book of Lulun (それいけ！アンパンマン ばいきんまんとえほんのルルン, Soreike! Anpanman: Baikinman to Ehon no Rurun)
- June 27, 2025: Let's Go! Anpanman: Chapon's Hero! (それいけ！アンパンマン チャポンのヒーロー！, Soreike! Anpanman: Chapon no Hīrō!)
- June 26, 2026: Let's Go! Anpanman: Pantan and the Star of Promises (それいけ!アンパンマン パンタンと約束の星, Soreike! Anpanman: Pantan to Yakusoku no Hoshi)

=== Animated shorts ===
In 1990, Tokyo Movie Shinsha started producing short subject Anpanman movies. These are around 24 minutes (except the second which is a double-length short) that were shown in conjunction with the full-length movies seen above. The shorts made in 1989 and 1993 are not included as they do not involve the world of Anpanman.

- Let's Go! Anpanman: Omusubiman (それいけ!アンパンマン おむすびまん), July 14, 1990
- Let's Go! Anpanman: Dokin-chan's Doki-Doki Calendar (それいけ!アンパンマン ドキンちゃんのドキドキカレンダー), July 20, 1991
- Let's Go! Anpanman: Anpanman and His Pleasant Friends (それいけ!アンパンマン アンパンマンとゆかいな仲間たち), March 14, 1992
- Let's Go! Anpanman: Everyone Get Together! Anpanman World (それいけ!アンパンマン みんな集まれ!アンパンマンワールド), July 16, 1994
- Let's Go! Anpanman: Anpanman and Your Happy Birthday (それいけ!アンパンマン アンパンマンとハッピーおたんじょう日), July 29, 1995
- Let's Go! Anpanman: Baikinman and the 3-"Bai" Punch (それいけ!アンパンマン ばいきんまんと3ばいパンチ), July 13, 1996
- Let's Go! Anpanman: We're Heroes (それいけ!アンパンマン ぼくらはヒーロー), July 28, 1997
- Let's Go! Anpanman: Anpanman and His Strange Friend (それいけ!アンパンマン アンパンマンとおかしな仲間), July 25, 1998
- Let's Go! Anpanman: Anpanman and Their Funny Friends (それいけ!アンパンマン アンパンマンとたのしい仲間たち), July 24, 1999
- Let's Go! Anpanman: Yakisobapanman and Blacksabodenman (それいけ!アンパンマン やきそばパンマンとブラックサボテンマン), July 29, 2000
- Let's Go! Anpanman: The Amazing Naganegiman and Yakisobapanman (それいけ!アンパンマン 怪傑ナガネギマンとやきそばパンマン), July 14, 2001
- Let's Go! Anpanman: Tuna Maki-chan and Gold Kamameshidon (それいけ!アンパンマン 鉄火のマキちゃんと金のかまめしどん), July 13, 2002
- Let's Go! Anpanman: The Amazing Naganegiman and Princess Doremi (それいけ!アンパンマン 怪傑ナガネギマンとドレミ姫), July 12, 2003
- Let's Go! Anpanman: Tsukiko and Shiratama ~Heart-racing Dancing~ (それいけ!アンパンマン つきことしらたま〜ときめきダンシング〜), July 17, 2004
- Let's Go! Anpanman: Princess Snow-black and Popular Baikinman (それいけ!アンパンマン くろゆき姫とモテモテばいきんまん), July 16, 2005
- Let's Go! Anpanman: Kokin-chan and the Blue Tears (それいけ!アンパンマン コキンちゃんとあおいなみだ), July 15, 2006
- Let's Go! Anpanman: Horrorman and Hora-horako (それいけ!アンパンマン ホラーマンとホラ・ホラコ), July 14, 2007
- Let's Go! Anpanman: Hiyahiyahiyarico and Babu-Babu-Baikinman (それいけ!アンパンマン ヒヤヒヤヒヤリコ と ばぶ・ばぶばいきんまん), July 12, 2008
- Let's Go! Anpanman: Baikinman VS Baikinman!? (それいけ!アンパンマン ばいきんまんVSバイキンマン!?), July 4, 2009
- Let's Go! Anpanman: Run! The Exciting Anpanman Grand Prix (それいけ!アンパンマン はしれ!わくわくアンパンマングランプリ), July 10, 2010
- Let's Go! Anpanman: Sing and Play! Anpanman and the Treasure in the Forest (それいけ!アンパンマン うたっててあそび! アンパンマンともりのたから), July 2, 2011
- Let's Go! Anpanman: Rhythm and Play! Anpanman and the Strange Parasol (それいけ!アンパンマン リズムでてあそび アンパンマンとふしぎなパラソル), July 7, 2012
- Let's Go! Anpanman: Fun for Everyone! Anpanman and the Mischievous Ghosts (みんなで てあそび アンパンマンといたずらオバケ), July 6, 2013
- Let's Go! Anpanman: Playtime for Everyone! Kokin-Chan has Become Mum!? (たのしくてあそび ママになったコキンちゃん!?), July 5, 2014
- Sing and Rhythm! Anpanman Summer Festival (リズムでうたおう！アンパンマン夏まつり), July 4, 2015

=== Christmas specials ===
In December 1988, Tokyo Movie Shinsha started making Anpanman Christmas specials. A total of 32 Christmas Specials have been made.

- December 19, 1988: Let's Go! Anpanman: Santa Claus Disappears (それいけ!アンパンマン 消えたサンタクロース)
- December 25, 1989: Let's Go! Anpanman: Anpanman and the Christmas Valley (それいけ!アンパンマン アンパンマンとクリスマスの谷)
- December 24, 1990: Let's Go! Anpanman: Shine! Our Christmas Tree (それいけ!アンパンマン 光れ!ぼくらのクリスマスツリー)
- December 23, 1991: Let's Go! Anpanman: The Mysterious Jingle Bells (それいけ!アンパンマン ふしぎなふしぎなジングルベル)
- December 21, 1992: Let's Go! Anpanman: Delivered! Our Christmas Cake (それいけ!アンパンマン とどけ!みんなのクリスマスケーキ)
- December 20, 1993: Let's Go! Anpanman: The South Island's White Christmas (それいけ!アンパンマン 南の島のホワイトクリスマス)
- December 19, 1994: Let's Go! Anpanman: The 2 Panna's Christmas (それいけ!アンパンマン ふたりのパンナのクリスマス)
- December 25, 1995: Let's Go! Anpanman: White Keito's Christmas (それいけ!アンパンマン けいとのしろのクリスマス)
- December 13, 1996: Let's Go! Anpanman: Anpanman and the Black Christmas (それいけ!アンパンマン アンパンマンとブラッククリスマス)
- December 25, 1997: Let's Go! Anpanman: The Meringue Sisters' Christmas (それいけ!アンパンマン メレンゲシスターズのクリスマス)
- December 24, 1998: Let's Go! Anpanman: Our Christmas Concert (それいけ!アンパンマン ぼくらのクリスマスコンサート)
- December 23, 1999: Let's Go! Anpanman: Anpanman and Your Merry Christmas (それいけ!アンパンマン アンパンマンとメリークリスマス)
- December 21, 2000: Let's Go! Anpanman: Anpanman's Christmas Show (それいけ!アンパンマン アンパンマンのクリスマスショー)
- December 20, 2001: Let's Go! Anpanman: Anpanman and Small Santa's Christmas (それいけ!アンパンマン アンパンマンとちいさなサンタのクリスマス)
- December 19, 2002: Let's Go! Anpanman: The Flame of Courage and Christmas (それいけ!アンパンマン 勇気のほのおとクリスマス)
- December 25, 2003: Let's Go! Anpanman: Black Santa and the Nice Present (それいけ!アンパンマン ブラックサンタとすてきなプレゼント)
- December 24, 2004: Let's Go! Anpanman: Anpanman and the Star of Christmas (それいけ!アンパンマン アンパンマンとクリスマスの星)
- December 23, 2005: Let's Go! Anpanman: Anpanman's Jin-Jin-Jingle Bells (それいけ!アンパンマン アンパンマンのジンジンジングルベル)
- December 22, 2006: Let's Go! Anpanman: Sing! Dance! Everybody's Christmas (それいけ!アンパンマン うたおう!おどろう!みんなのクリスマス)
- December 21, 2007: Let's Go! Anpanman: Kokin-chan and the Christmas of Tears (それいけ!アンパンマン コキンちゃんとなみだのクリスマス)
- December 19, 2008: Let's Go! Anpanman: Franken-Robo-kun's Surprised Christmas (それいけ!アンパンマン フランケンロボくんのビックリクリスマス)
- December 25, 2009: Let's Go! Anpanman: Do your Best Creampanda! The Christmas Adventure (それいけ!アンパンマン がんばれクリームパンダ!クリスマスの冒険)
- December 24, 2010: Let's Go! Anpanman: Red-Nosed Chappy - The Christmas of Courage (それいけ!アンパンマン 赤鼻チャッピー勇気のクリスマス)
- December 23, 2011: Let's Go! Anpanman: Anpanman and Gomira's Christmas Castle (それいけ!アンパンマン アンパンマンとゴミラの城のクリスマス)
- December 21, 2012: Let's Go! Anpanman: Doremifa Island's Christmas (それいけ!アンパンマン ドレミファ島のクリスマス)
- December 20, 2013: Let's Go! Anpanman: Shine! Tin Kid's Christmas Tree (かがやけ! ブリキッドのクリスマスツリー)
- December 19, 2014: Let's Go! Anpanman: Anpanman and the letter to Santa (それいけ!アンパンマン アンパンマンとサンタさんへの手紙)
- December 18, 2015: Let's Go! Anpanman: Baikinman and the Lovely Christmas Present (それいけ!アンパンマン: ばいきんまんとすてきなクリスマスプレゼント)
- December 23, 2016: Let's Go! Anpanman: Poppo's Christmas Twinkle (それいけ!アンパンマン: ポッポちゃんのきらきらクリスマス)

=== Video games ===
There are currently a total of 42 video games on this list based on the Soreike! Anpanman anime series, ranging from adventure games to educational games. With the exception of Soreike! Anpanman Eigo to Nakayoshi 2 Tanoshii Carnival, the video games were released only in Japan.

Famicom

- Oeka Kids: Anpanman to Oekaki Shiyou!!
- Oeka Kids: Anpanman no Hiragana Daisuki
- Soreike! Anpanman: Minna de Hiking Game!

PlayStation

- Kids Station: Soreike! Anpanman
- Kids Station: Soreike! Anpanman 2: Anpanman to Daibouken
- Kids Station: Soreike! Anpanman 3
- Kids Station: Oshaberi Oekaki Soreike! Anpanman

Nintendo DS

- Soreike! Anpanman: Baikinman no Daisakusen
- Anpanman to Asobo: Aiueo Kyoushitsu
- Anpanman to Asobo: ABC Kyoushitsu
- Anpanman to Touch de Waku Waku Training
- Anpanman to Asobu: Aiueo Kyoushitsu DX

Nintendo 3DS

- Anpanman to Asobo: New Aiueo Kyoushitsu
- Anpanman to Touch de Waku Waku Training

Nintendo Switch

- Anpanman Touch de Enjoy!: Aiueo Kyoushitsu for Nintendo Switch

Game Boy Color

- Soreike! Anpanman: Fushigi na Nikoniko Album
- Soreike! Anpanman: 5tsu no Tou no Ousama

Wii

- Anpanman Niko Niko Party

Sega Pico

- Soreike! Anpanman Eigo to Nakayoshi Youchiende ABC
- Soreike! Anpanman no Game de Asobou Anpanman
- Soreike! Anpanman no o-Hanashi Daisuki Anpanman
- Soreike! Anpanman Eigo to Nakayoshi 2 Tanoshii Carnival
- Soreike! Anpanman no Medalympic World
- Soreike! Anpanman no Minna de Kyousou Anpanman!
- Soreike! Anpanman: Anpanman to Denwa de Asobou!
- Soreike! Anpanman Anpanman to Tanoshii Drive!
- Soreike! Anpanman Anpanman to Kotoba Asobi
- Soreike! Anpanman no Medalympic World 2
- Soreike! Anpanman: Anpanman to Suuji Asobi
- Anpanman Pico Waku Waku Pan Koujou
- Anpanman to PC Renshuu!
- Gakken Anpanman to Chinou Up!
- Soreike! Anpanman: Anpanman no Chie no World
- Soreike! Anpanman Hajimete Asobu Pico Soft: Anpanman no Iro-Kazu-Katachi Nurie mo Dekichau zo!
- Soreike! Anpanman: Anpanman no Hitori de Dekichatta!

Advanced Pico Beena

- Soreike! Anpanman Hajimete Kaketa yo! Oboeta yo! Hiragana Katakana ~Gojūon Board Kinō-tsuki~
- Shoku Iku Series 1 Soreike! Anpanman: Sukikirainai Ko Genki na Ko!
- Anpanman no Waku Waku Game Oekaki
- Anpanman o Sagase!
- Soreike! Anpanman Card de Tanoshiku ♪ ABC
- Soreike! Anpanman Doki Doki! Rescue Drive ~Car Navi-tsuki~
- Soreike! Anpanman o Mise ga Ippai! TV de o-Ryōri Tsukutchao
- Soreike! Anpanman Waku Waku Eigo Game!

Arcade

- Let's Go! Anpanman: Popcorn Factory

Playdia

- Soreike! Anpanman: Picnic de Obenkyō

== Theme music ==
=== Openings ===
1. "Anpanman's March" (アンパンマンのマーチ, Anpanman no Māchi)

=== Endings ===
1. "Courage Rin-Rin" (勇気りんりん, Yūki Rinrin)
2. "Christmas Valley" (クリスマスの谷, Kurisumasu Tani)
3. "Anpanman Gymnastics" (アンパンマンたいそう, Anpanman Taisō)
4. "Anpanman Gymnastics: Dreaming Version" (アンパンマンたいそう ドリーミングバージョン, Anpanman Taisō Dorīmingu Bājon)
5. "Sun-Sun Gymnastics" (サンサンたいそう, Sansan Taisō)
6. "Do-Re-Mi-Fa-Anpanman" (ドレミファアンパンマン)

== Reception ==
In 2011, research by Bandai found Anpanman to be the most popular fictional character among people aged 0 to 12 in Japan for 10 consecutive years. Anpanman overtook Hello Kitty as Japan's top-grossing character in 2002, and was Japan's top-grossing character as of 2019.

=== Retail sales ===
By 2006, the Anpanman books had sold over 50 million copies in Japan. By the time Takashi Yanase died in 2013, the Anpanman picture books had sold 68 million copies. As of February 2019, Anpanman has sold more than 80 million books. As of March 2021, Bandai Namco has sold 2.39 million Anpanman PC units since 1999, including tablet computers.

Retail sales of Anpanman related products grossed an annual revenue of at least ¥150 billion consecutively for nearly 30 years.

=== Box office ===
Anpanman box office performance
Film	Year	Distributor rentals	Gross receipts	Ref
Kirakira Boshi no Namida	1989	¥250,000,000	¥461,940,000	
Baikinman no Gyakushū	1990	¥350,000,000	¥664,000,000	
Fly! Fly! Chibigon	1991	¥180,000,000	¥180,000,000+	
The Secret of Building Block Castle	1992	¥200,000,000	¥200,000,000+	
Shabondama no Purun	2007	—N/a	¥50,000,000	
Yōsei Rinrin no Himitsu	2008	—N/a	¥350,000,000	
Dadandan to Futago no Hoshi	2009	—N/a	¥180,000,000	
Burakku Nōzu to Mahō no Uta	2010	—N/a	¥230,000,000	
Sukue! Kokorin to Kiseki no Hoshi	2011	—N/a	$4,080,957	
Yomigaere Bananajima	2012	—N/a	¥510,000,000	
Tobase! Kibou no Handkerchief	2013	—N/a	¥424,000,000	
Ringo Bōya to Minna no Negai	2014	—N/a	¥400,000,000	
Mija to Mahō no Lamp	2015	—N/a	¥540,000,000	
Omocha no Hoshi no Nanda to Runda	2016	—N/a	¥555,000,000	
Buruburu no Takarasagashi Daibouken!	2017	—N/a	¥540,000,000	
Kagayake! Kurun to Inochi no Hoshi	2018	—N/a	¥649,000,000	

== Legacy ==
There are five museums across Japan that are dedicated to Anpanman, such as the Yokohama Anpanman Children's Museum & Mall. There is also the Yanase Takashi Memorial Hall, a museum dedicated to Takashi Yanase himself.

Anpanman train livery is featured on some of JR Shikoku trains, such as the JR Shikoku 2000 series DMU and the JR Shikoku 8000 series EMU.

The Anpanman Official Shop Taipei, the first overseas Anpanman shop specializing in products related to the series, opened at the Shin Kong Mitsukoshi shopping mall in Taipei on September 10, 2015.

Anpanman inspired the manga and anime series One-Punch Man (ワンパンマン, Wanpanman). It is a webcomic/manga series created by One, with the title a play on the titular character.

In the manga My Hero Academia, the superhero character All Might is shown to have read Anpanman as a child.

BTS released a song in their hit album Love Yourself: Tear under the name "Anpanman" with many references to the series.

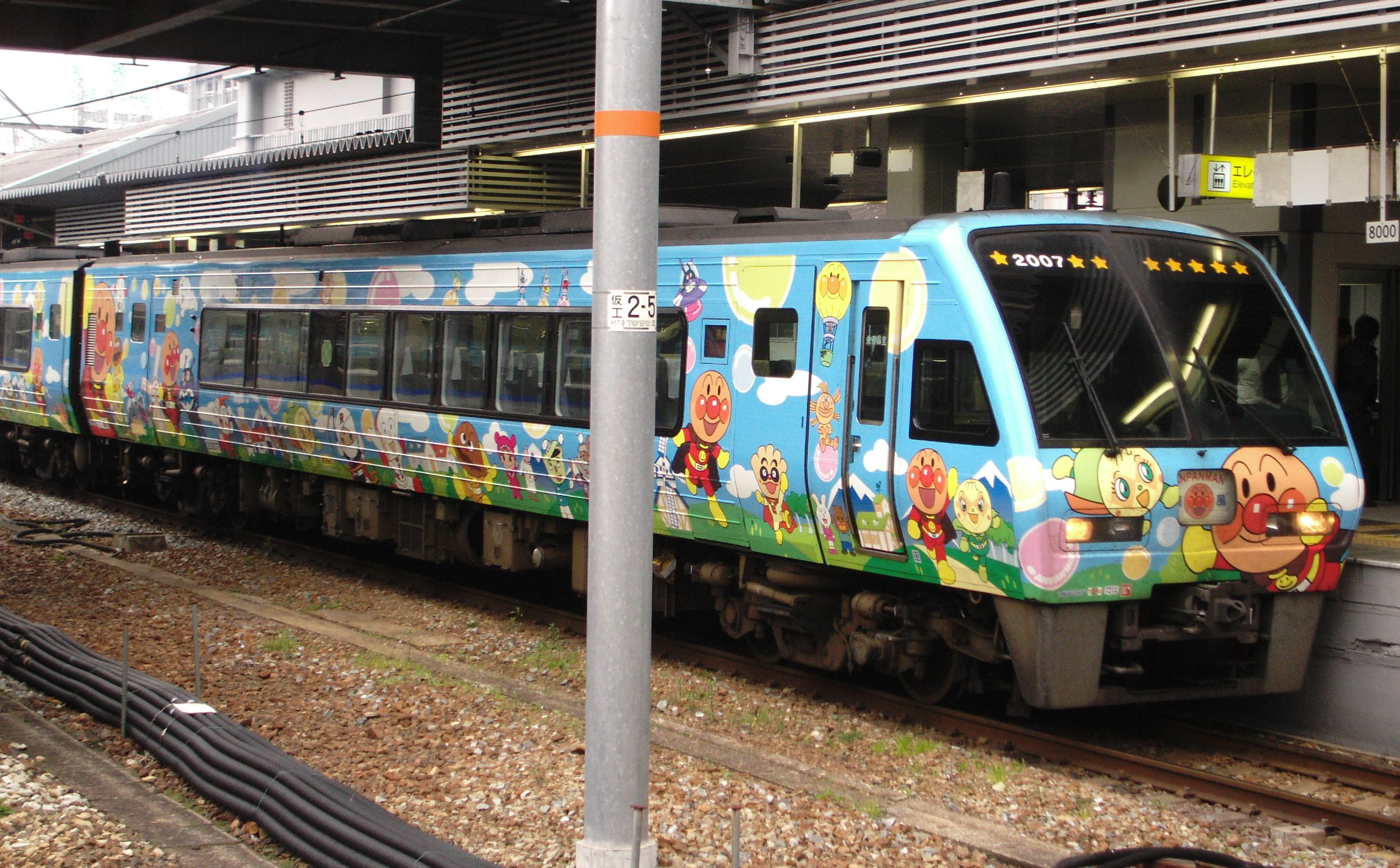
Anpanman characters on a JR Shikoku 2000 series train

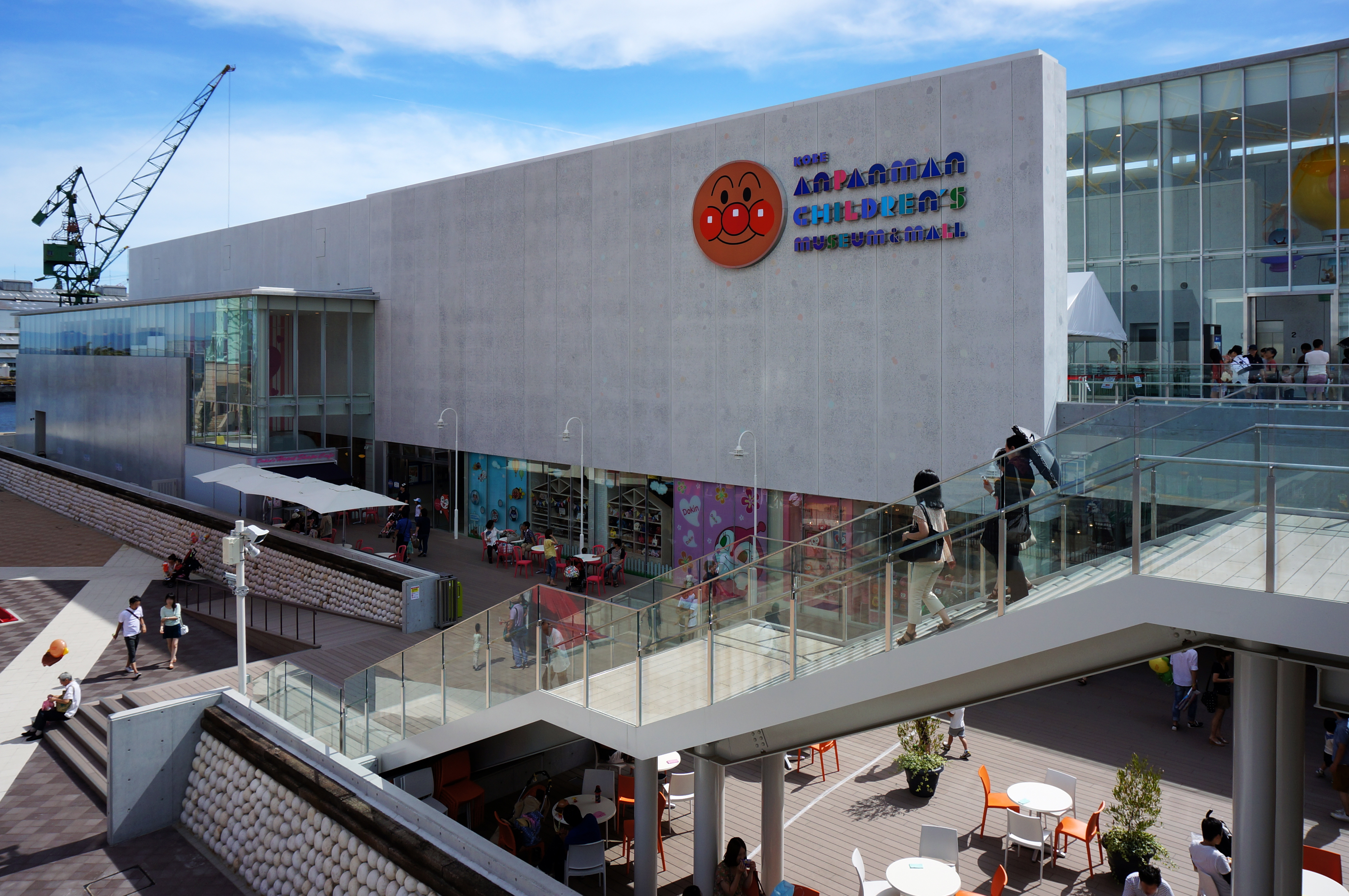
The façade of Kobe Anpanman Children's Museum & Mall

== See also ==
- Mighty Cat Masked Niyander
- Takoyaki Mantoman
