= Takashi Yanase =

Japanese manga artist (1919–2013)

- 柳瀬 嵩
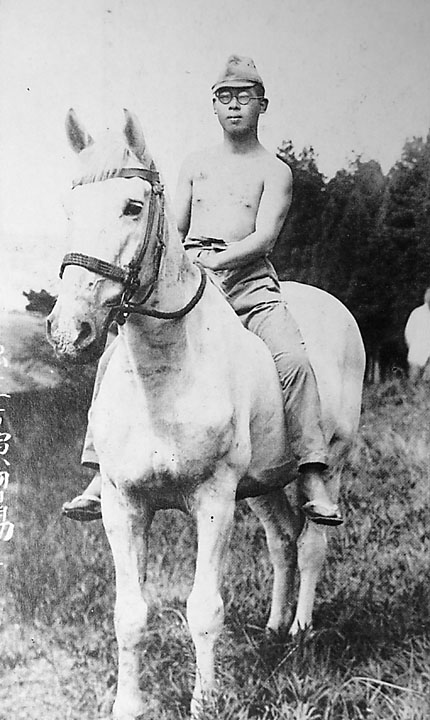
- Hijūdai Maneuver Area, 1940.
- Born: February 6, 1919; Kochi, Empire of Japan
- Died: October 13, 2013 (aged 94); Hongō, Tokyo, Japan
- Occupations: Manga artist, illustrator, lyricist, poet
- Known for: Anpanman
- Spouse: Nobu Komatsu (m. 1947; died 1993)
- Military service
- Allegiance: Empire of Japan
- Branch: Imperial Japanese Army
- Service years: 1941–1945
- Rank: Sergeant
- Unit: China Expeditionary Army
- Conflicts: Second Sino-Japanese War; World War II; Pacific War

Takashi Yanase (やなせ たかし, Yanase Takashi, February 6, 1919 – October 13, 2013) was a Japanese manga artist and writer, poet, illustrator and lyricist, perhaps best known as the creator of the picture book and animated series Anpanman. Yanase was also chairman of the Japan Cartoonists Association from May 2000 to 2012.

== Early life, military service ==
After graduating from the Tokyo School of Arts and Crafts in 1939, Yanase was hired by Tokyo Tanabe Pharmaceuticals where he worked in the marketing department.

In 1941, he was drafted into the army under the 6th Field Heavy Artillery Reserve Company stationed in China. As an educated non-commissioned officer, he was assigned to senbu (psychological warfare) operations, presenting kamishibai (street theatre and storytelling) to Chinese civilians. His younger brother was killed in action during the Pacific Campaign of World War II.

Post-war, alongside other veterans, Yanase made a living collecting garbage. To pursue his artistic career, he joined Kōchi Shimbun newspaper as an editor in 1946. Once he learned that his co-worker, Nobu Komatsu, was quitting and relocating to Tokyo, Yanase did the same. They got married in 1947.

While working at Mitsukoshi department store as a graphic designer, Yanase would pick up drawing manga seriously, submitting his works to newspapers and magazines. Finding success, Yanase would quit to work on manga full-time in 1953. His income from manga was triple that of his department-store job.

== Views on religion ==
The day after his death, an obituary in the October 16, 2013, edition of the Tokyo Shimbun reported that he was "a dandy Christian with a strong faith". However, a correction was later published in the November 20, 2013, edition of the same newspaper: "It was an error to refer to Takashi Yanase as a Christian".

Further supporting this correction were Yanase's own words in Gekkan Omoshihan No. 57, Special Feature: "No Need for Religion!", and "I don't have any religious beliefs at all. I'll probably never turn to religion.", and "I'm not religious at all, even though I respect religion and worship God in my own way. I'm not religious at all."

Photographs of his gravesite also show no evidence of him being a Christian. His gravesite lacks a cross, Bible verses, or other references to Jesus Christ and Christianity. He was cremated and buried at his father's former home, where he spent his early childhood. On his gravestone, a Japanese poem is engraved. Translated from Japanese, "I want to be a magnolia tree. In the season, bashful and shy, white flowers will bloom. I want to sway with the breeze."

== Works ==
=== Prose nonfiction ===
- Anpanman's Testament (アンパンマンの遺書, Anpanman no isho; February 1995)
- Life Is Strange: Words to Live By (人生なんておかしいね 人生の言葉, Jinsei nante okashii ne Jinsei no kokoro; 1996 (Keibunsha), 2002 (Tachibana Shuppan))
- Second Youth Is a Thrill! (痛快！第二の青春, Tsūkai! Dai-ni no seishun; August 2003)
- Life Is But a Dream (人生なんて夢だけど, Jinsei nante yume da kedo; February 2005)
- Anyone Can Be a Poet (だれでも詩人になれる本, Dare de mo shijin ni nareru hon; February 2009)
- Life Gets Interesting at 90! (人生、90歳からおもしろい!, Jinsei, kyūjussai kara omoshiroi!; July 2009)
- If I Were to Talk About Justice (わたしが正義について語るなら, Watashi ga seigi ni tsuite kataru nara; December 2009)
- Next to Despair Lies Hope! (絶望の隣は希望です!, Zetsubō no tonari wa kibō desu!; September 2011) – written in response to the 2011 Tōhoku earthquake and tsunami

=== Picture books ===
==== Standalone works ====
- The Gentle Lion (やさしいライオン, Yasashii Raion; 1969 (serialized)/1975 (released); English translation by Shauna Rosgen, April 2008)
- Little Jumbo (ちいさなジャンボ, Chiisana Janbo)
- Goodbye Jumbo (さよならジャンボ, Sayonara Janbo; May 1977)
- Ringing Bell (チリンのすず, Chirin no Suzu; January 1978)

==== Mighty Cat Masked Niyandar series ====
This series was created as a revision to the premise of his newspaper comic Hippity Hoppity Masked Savior (ピョンピョンおたすけかめん, Pyon-pyon otasuke kamen), which ran in the Asahi Shimbun from 1996 to 2000 and had a rabbit protagonist. Three books were published concurrently with the anime of the same name, which was developed in tandem.

1. The Magic Backpack – A Hero Is Born (まほうのランドセル たんじょうへん, Mahō no randoseru Tanjō-hen; February 2000)
2. The Mysterious Adventure (ふしぎなぼうけん, Fushigi na bōken; November 2000)
3. Miiko's Transformation (ミーコのへんしん, Mīko no henshin; July 2001)

==== Anpanman series ====
The first four books
In 2009, the anime Anpanman series entered the Guinness World Records for having the highest number of characters (over 1,700).
The original books in the Anpanman series were published during the 1970s. All except Go! Anpanman were run in the "Kinder Ohanashi Ehon" (キンダーおはなしえほん) monthly anthology series before being subsequently republished for the mass market under the "Kinder Ohanashi Ehon Masterpiece Selection" (キンダーおはなしえほん傑作選) imprint; however, the first book was not republished until 1976, making the second book technically the first canonical Anpanman story to be released. Of these, Anpanman and Gorillaman is out of print.

1. Anpanman (あんぱんまん; October 1973 (serialized) / May 1976 (released))
2. Go! Anpanman (それいけ！アンパンマン; November 1975) (Published under "Froebel-kan no Ehon" imprint)
3. Anpanman and Gorillaman (あんぱんまんとごりらまん; June 1976 (serialized) / December 1976 (released))
4. Anpanman and Baikinman (あんぱんまんとばいきんまん; May 1979 (serialized) / July 1979 (released))

Children's Fairytale Storybooks Masterpiece Selection series (キンダーメルヘンえほん傑作選)
Several books originally serialized in the monthly Children's Fairytale Storybooks (キンダーメルヘンえほん) anthology series in the early 1980s. While they were also released to the mass market, they are now out of print.

1. Anpanman and Shokupanman (あんぱんまんとしょくぱんまん; June 1980 (serialized) / September 1981 (released))
2. Shokupanman (しょくぱんまん; July 1981 (serialized) / September 1982 (released))
3. Akachanman (あかちゃんまん; May 1982 (serialized) / September 1985 (released))
4. Anpanman and Currypanman (アンパンマンとカレーパンマン; February 1985 (serialized) / September 1985 (released))

Anpanman Mini-Books series (アンパンマンミニえほん)
A series of twenty-five storybooks published from 1983 to 1984 after the end of the monthly comic. These books were out of print for over a decade until 2010, when they were republished.

1. Anpanman and the Lost Alien (アンパンマンとまいごのうちゅうじん; April 1983)
2. Anpanman and the Giant Monster Ankora (アンパンマンとかいじゅうアンコラ; April 1983)
3. Anpanman and the Graffiti Kid (アンパンマンとらくがきこぞう; April 1983)
4. Anpanman and the Kabirunruns (アンパンマンとかびるんるん; April 1983)
5. Anpanman and the Ghost Forest (アンパンマンとおばけのもり; April 1983)
6. Anpanman and Lookalikepan (アンパンマンとそっくりぱん; April 1983)
7. Anpanman and Lumpman (アンパンマンとたんこぶまん; November 1983)
8. Anpanman and Butamanman (アンパンマンとぶたまんまん; November 1983)
9. Anpanman and Kazekonkon (アンパンマンとかぜこんこん; November 1983)
10. Anpanman and Currypanman/Omusubiman (アンパンマンとカレーパンマン・おむすびまん; November 1983)
11. Anpanman and the Yawn-Bird (アンパンマンとあくびどり)
12. Anpanman and Hedoroman (アンパンマンとへどろまん)
13. Anpanman and Nankahendaa (アンパンマンとナンカヘンダー)
14. Anpanman and Ramen Angel (アンパンマンとらーめんてんし)
15. Anpanman and Thunder Pika-tan (アンパンマンとかみなりぴかたん)
16. Anpanman and Toothpasteman (アンパンマンとはみがきまん)
17. Anpanman and Namekujira (アンパンマンとなめくじら)
18. Anpanman and Beroberoman (アンパンマンとべろべろまん)
19. Anpanman and the Snifflebomb (アンパンマンとしくしくばくだん)
20. Anpanman and Tendonman (アンパンマンとてんどんまん)
21. Anpanman and the Fireball Kid (アンパンマンとひのたまこぞう)
22. Anpanman and Apple-chan (アンパンマンとりんごちゃん)
23. Anpanman and the Lake Princess (アンパンマンとみずうみひめ)
24. Anpanman and Takoyakiman (アンパンマンとたこやきまん)
25. Anpanman and Milk Boy (アンパンマンとみるくぼうや)

The Adventures of Anpanman series (アンパンマンのぼうけん)
A fifteen-book series published between 1987 and 1989, which ended just prior to the start of the weekly newspaper comic strip. Some (but not all) of the series were published in picture-book anthologies prior to mass-market publication. The Soreike! Anpanman anime began during the release of this series, and the character Dokinchan (introduced in book six, Anpanman and Dokin) featured heavily there from the start, influencing Yanase's later Anpanman works.

1. Anpanman and Pot-chan (アンパンマンとポットちゃん; September 1985 (serialized) / October 1987 (released))
2. Anpanman and Piichiku Forest (アンパンマンとぴいちくもり; May 1986 (serialized) / October 1987 (released))
3. Anpanman and Dadandan (アンパンマンとだだんだん; May 1987 (serialized) / October 1987 (released))
4. Anpanman and Mogurin (アンパンマンともぐりん; December 1987)
5. Anpanman and The Building-Block Castle (アンパンマンとつみきのしろ; May 1984 (serialized) / February 1988 (released))
6. Anpanman and Dokin (アンパンマンとドキン; March 1988)
7. Anpanman and the Sea-Devil (アンパンマンとうみのあくま; April 1988)
8. Anpanman and Bonbon Island (アンパンマンとぼんぼんじま; July 1988)
9. Anpanman and Invisibleman (アンパンマンとみえないまん; May 1988 (serialized) / July 1988 (released))
10. Anpanman and Chikurin (アンパンマンとちくりん; September 1988)
11. Anpanman and Dodo (アンパンマンとドド; April 1989)
12. Anpanman and Tartan (アンパンマンとタータン; May 1989)
13. Anpanman and Crescent-Moon Man (アンパンマンとみかづきまん; June 1989)
14. Anpanman and Karen's Forest (アンパンマンとカレンのもり; May 1989 (serialized) / October 1989 (released))
15. Anpanman and the Black Bird (アンパンマンとくろいとり; October 1989)

Omusubiman series
A spinoff of the main Anpanman series, featuring the character Omusubiman and his younger companion Komusubiman. Published in the 1980s and early 1990s, all books in the series are now out of print.

Anpanman no Ohanashi Detekoi series (アンパンマンのおはなしでてこい)
A twelve-book series begun immediately after the end of the newspaper comic.

1. Anpanman and the Water Castle (アンパンマンとみずのしろ; May 1994)
2. Anpanman and Princess Greenleaf (アンパンマンとあおばひめ; July 1994)
3. Anpanman and the Magic Wooden Horse (アンパンマンとまほうのもくば; November 1994)
4. Anpanman and Rollpanna (アンパンマンとロールパンナ; February 1995)
5. Anpanman and Toothpaste Mountain (アンパンマンとはみがきやま; April 1995)
6. Anpanman and Marimo-kun (アンパンマンとまりもくん; July 1995)
7. Anpanman and the Land of Dreams (アンパンマンとゆめのくに; November 1995)
8. Anpanman and Marbleman (アンパンマンとびいだまん; February 1996)
9. Anpanman and PunchPunchPuuunch (アンパンマンとぱしぱしぱしーん; May 1996)
10. Anpanman and Balloonman (アンパンマンとふうせんまん; July 1996)
11. Anpanman and the Magic Brush (アンパンマンとまほうのふで; November 1996)
12. Anpanman and Chibizou-kun (アンパンマンとちびぞうくん; January 1997)

Anpanman Lullabies (アンパンマンのこもりうた) series
A collection of bedtime stories for children.

1. The Sleepy Sleepy Uncle (ねむねむおじさん; February 1998)
2. The Night-Night Sleepy Tree (ねんねんねむのき; March 1998)
3. Shidoro and Modoro (シドロとモドロ; May 1998)
4. The Dream Foal (ゆめのこうま; September 1998)

Anpanman no Ohanashi Wakuwaku (アンパンマンのおはなしわくわく) series
Another twelve-book collection of original Anpanman stories following up the "Ohanashi Detekoi" series.

1. Anpanman's Secret (アンパンマンのひみつ; July 1999)
2. Anpanman and the Rainbow Ghost (アンパンマンとにじおばけ; December 1999)
3. Keep It Secret from Anpanman (アンパンマンにはないしょ; March 2000)
4. Anpanman and Naganegiman (アンパンマンとナガネギマン; December 2001)
5. Anpanman and Dokinchan's Dream (アンパンマンとドキンちゃんのゆめ; July 2002)
6. Anpanman and the Desert Treasure (アンパンマンとさばくのたから; March 2004)
7. Anpanman and Snow Black (アンパンマンとくろゆきひめ; October 2004)
8. Anpanman and the Blue Tears (アンパンマンとあおいなみだ; October 2005)
9. Anpanman and the Question-Mark Tower (アンパンマンとハテナのとう; April 2006)
10. Anpanman and the Flying Ume Fruit (アンパンマンとそらとぶうめのみ; September 2006)
11. Anpanman and Shabondaman (アンパンマンとシャボンダマン; February 2007)
12. Anpanman and Horror Horrorko (アンパンマンとホラ・ホラコ; April 2007)

"Anpanman no Runrun Ehon" series (アンパンマンのるんるんえほん)
A series of small-format storybooks, published in 2003.

1. Anpanman and Friends (アンパンマンとなかまたち; May 2003)
2. Dokinchan and Pillow Kid (ドキンちゃんとまくらこぞう; May 2003)
3. Baikinman's Sudden Change (ばいきんまんのはやがわり; May 2003)
4. Melonpanna's Drink-drink-drink (メロンパンナのぐーぐーぐー; May 2003)

Anpanman no Ohanashi Runrun series (アンパンマンのおはなしるんるん)
The latest, still-ongoing Anpanman picture-book series, with six books to date.

1. Anpanman and Bookman (アンパンマンとブックマン; November 2008)
2. Anpanman and the Twin Stars (アンパンマンとふたごのほし; March 2009)
3. Anpanman and the Artist Beret-chan (アンパンマンとおえかきベレちゃん, November 2009)
4. Anpanman and the Flower Castle (アンパンマンとはなのしろ, March 2010)
5. Anpanman and the Forest Treasure (アンパンマンともりのたから; November 2010)
6. Anpanman and Yawn-Boy (アンパンマンとアクビぼうや; March 2011)
7. Anpanman and Shidoro & Modoro (アンパンマンとシドロアンドモドロ; November 2011)

Anpanman Christmas books
Christmas-themed Anpanman books, published irregularly (roughly once a decade).

1. Anpanman's Santa Claus (アンパンマンのサンタクロース; November 1981)
2. Anpanman's Christmas (アンパンマンのクリスマス; November 1988)
3. Merry Christmas! with Anpanman (アンパンマンとメリークリスマス！; November 1998)
4. Anpanman's Christmas Eve (アンパンマンのクリスマス・イブ; November 2004)

Soreike! Anpanman theatrical movie series
Official adaptations of the latest films in the Soreike! Anpanman anime series, published concurrently with the film release. In contrast to the official movie titles, the book titles are written without any kanji.

1. Nossy the Dinosaur's Great Adventure (きょうりゅうノッシーのだいぼうけん; July 1993)
2. Lyrical Magical Magic School (リリカルマジカルまほうのがっこう; July 1994)
3. Defeat the Ghost Ship! (ゆうれいせんをやっつけろ！; June 1995)
4. The Flying Picture-Book and the Glass Slippers (そらとぶえほんとガラスのくつ; July 1996)
5. The Rainbow Pyramid (にじのピラミッド; July 1997)
6. Palms to the Sun (てのひらをたいように; July 1998)
7. When the Flower of Courage Blooms (ゆうきのはながひらくとき; July 1999)
8. Tears of the Mermaid Princess (にんぎょひめのなみだ; July 2000)
9. Gomira's Star (ゴミラのほし; July 2001)
10. Roll & Rolla: Secret of the Floating Cloud Castle (ロールとローラ うきぐもじょうのひみつ; July 2002)
11. Ruby's Wish (ルビーのねがい; July 2003)
12. Nyanii of Dream Cat Land (ゆめねこのくにのニャニイ; June 2004)
13. Hapii's Great Adventure (ハピーのだいぼうけん; July 2005)
14. Dolly of the Star of Life (いのちのほしのドーリィ; July 2006)
15. Purun the Soap-Bubble (シャボンだまのプルン; July 2007)
16. Secret of the Fairy Rinrin (ようせいリンリンのひみつ; July 2008)
17. Dadandan and the Twin Stars (だだんだんとふたごのほし; June 2009)
18. Black Nose and the Magic Song (ブラックノーズとまほうのうた; June 2010)
19. Rescue them! Kokorin and the Miracle Star (すくえ！ココリンときせきのほし; June 2011)

=== Comics ===
Little Bō (リトル・ボオ, Ritoru Bō)
The heroic adventures of a small person wearing a hat that comes down over his eyes, run in Takashimaya department store's mail-order catalog. A prototype for the Anpanman character Butterko appears here with the same name, though the name pun is different (from dotabata, running around noisily).
Hot-Blooded Fairytale Masterpiece Anpanman (熱血メルヘン傑作アンパンマン)
Published in the January 1975 to May 1976 issues of Monthly Poetry and Fairytales (月刊詩とメルヘン). This manga was a series of illustrated stories aimed at adults, and included the supporting characters "Nakasu Yaruse" (a cartoonist) and "Miruka Mite" (a female reporter). Never reprinted.
Anpanman (あんぱんまん)
Serialized in the September 1976 to July 1982 issues of Monthly Ichigo Ehon (月刊いちごえほん), published by Sanrio. The series consisted of 71 two-page chapters of six or eight panels each. In January 1981, partway through the series, the title was changed to Anpanman (アンパンマン) (the same name, written in katakana instead of hiragana). Though never republished in collected form, it included several important elaborations of the Anpanman mythos, detailing the character's origin story and introducing the characters Butterko, Cheese, Shokupanman, Currypanman, and Baikinman.
Fly! Anpanman (とべ！アンパンマン)
A newspaper comic that ran in the Sunday issue of the Yomiuri Shimbun from 1 January 1990 to 29 May 1994, with a total of 227 strips. The series is partially reprinted in a three-volume collection that covers the first year and a half, with English translation (by Yuriko Tamaki) in the margins. Apart from its bilingual printing, it is also known for having Baikinman as its focus character, with a number of strips in which Anpanman does not appear at all.

1. (March 1991)
2. (November 1991)
3. (December 1991)

=== Animation ===
==== Creator ====
- The Gentle Lion (Yasashii Raion; 1970)
- Little Jumbo (Chiisana Janbo; 1977)
- Ringing Bell (チリンの鈴, Chirin no Suzu; 1978)
- Let's Go! Anpanman (それいけ！アンパンマン, Soreike! Anpanman; 1988–present)
- Mighty Cat Masked Niyandar (ニャニがニャンだー ニャンダーかめん, Nyani ga Nyan daa Nyandā Kamen; 2000)
- Laughing Hat Little Bō (わらうぼうし リトル・ボオ, Warau Bōshi Ritoru Bō; 2003)

==== Vocal performance ====
- Metropolis (2001) – minor role as a tribute to his former colleague Osamu Tezuka
- Let's Go! Anpanman Christmas special – "Dance! Sing! Christmas for Everyone" (2006): Special cameo as "Yanase Bunny"

==== Lyrics ====
- Norakuro (1970) – opening theme sung by Norakuro's voice actress Nobuyo Ōyama, known for being the voice of Doraemon in the 1979 series and the first voice of Katsuo Isono in Sazae-san.
- Mighty Cat Masked Niyander (2000)
- Tenohira wo Taiyou ni (1961)
