= 2nd Super Robot Wars OG =

2012 video game

- Developers: Tose; B.B. Studio
- Publisher: Namco Bandai Games
- Producer: Takenobu Terada
- Series: Super Robot Wars
- Platform: PlayStation 3
- Release: JP: November 29, 2012
- Genre: Tactical role-playing
- Mode: Single player

2nd Super Robot Wars Original Generation (第2次スーパーロボット大戦OG, Dai-2 Ji Sūpā Robotto Taisen Ōjī) is a tactical role-playing game for the PlayStation 3 developed by TOSE and published by Namco Bandai Games under the Banpresto label. It is the sequel to Super Robot Wars Original Generation Gaiden. It was intended to be released on September 29, 2011 as part of Super Robot Wars' 20th Anniversary, but was pushed back to November 29, 2012.

== Gameplay ==
2nd Super Robot Wars was developed by the same team behind Super Robot Wars Original Generation Gaiden. The game uses High-definition 2D sprites rendered over a 3D background. This effect was similarly used in the previous Super Robot Wars 64. The Twin Battle System from previous Original Generation installments, where two adjacent units can combine into a single squad, which can then attack simultaneously, returned. One new feature of the game is Maximum Break, which allows 4 units to attack simultaneously to the enemy. Another new system is an ability slot system, which each pilot and mech gets three ability slots. Twin Units, one in game piece with two robots and two pilots, have a total of twelve slots. Default abilities were equipped, when the game starts, and defeating enemies allows players to obtain new ones. To activate an effect, the player needs three of the same abilities equipped to either the pilot or mech.

== Changes and additions ==
Like Original Generation Gaiden, 2nd Super Robot Wars Original Generation includes new content, in the form of new characters and mecha, but also provides additions to existing characters and mechs.

- New mecha and characters from new series for the game include the following:
  - The YTA-06BW Cerberus, the selectable real robot from Super Robot Wars MX, with its pilots Hugo Medio and Aqua Centrum, alongside the YμP-05 Medius Locus, piloted by both antagonists Albero Est and Erde Mitte. The super robot YTA-07RB Garmreid is also selectable.
  - AVX-01 Aile Chevalier and AVX-02 Blanche Neige, the real robots from Super Robot Wars Destiny will make their official debut for the first time, including their pilots Joshua Radcliffe and Cliana Rimskaya, respectively. Their upgraded forms, the Géant Chevalier and Dea Blanche Neige, have confirmed appearances. The antagonist group Ruina will also make their appearance in the game, with the Melior Esse: Contagio, Aquila, Ignis, Umbra, Ventus and Glacies and their mechs, the Violaceum, Fortis Ala, Impetus, Priscus Nox, Studium and Fabularis. The upgraded super robot Forte Gigas appears in the game as a secret. Various scans and videos confirmed the enemy grunt units of Angelus, Belgrande, and Skull Plume.
  - RRR-X3 Flickerei Geist piloted by Arrière Org (voiced by Yumiko Kobayashi), the heroine from Real Robot Regiment finally debuts in the game. Devant Org (voiced by Kosuke Toriumi), the antagonist from the game will also be included, piloting the RRR-X7 Alles Geist.
  - The remaining units piloted by the main characters of 2nd Super Robot Wars Alpha will make their debut in this game. These are Kusuha Mizuha's DR-1C Ryuujinki, Ibis Douglas' YAM-008-2 Altairlion and Sleigh Presty's YSF-34 Vegalion. The Custos were confirmed in the cinematics alongside the Nashim Gan Eden and its pilot Irui. The antagonist unit Magarga and its pilot Kukuru also makes an appearance.
  - Ing Egret (voiced by Hiroshi Okamoto), the fourth Machinery Child from the 2nd Super Robot Wars Alpha side-story manga Lost Children will make an exclusive appearance. He will pilot a customized PTX-EX EXbein (first seen in Super Robot Wars Original Generation: The Inspector) called the PTX-EXH Ashe
  - The DGG-XAM03 RaiOh, the third Dynamic General Guardian from 3rd Super Robot Wars Alpha: To the End of the Galaxy, revealed during the game's announcement in Famitsu. Its pilot Touma Kanou also appears in the game.
  - The RPT-007KC Gespenst MK II Mass Production Custom Type-C, RPT-007KN Gespenst MK II Mass Production Custom Type-N and RPT-007 kg Gespenst MK II Mass Production Custom Type-G, special units that appeared from Another Century's Episode Portable finally make their proper appearance. These custom Gespenst models are derived from the Earth Federation Army's "Halloween Plan" to equip special forces with superior units. The Type-C sports powerful armor and is equipped with Twin Beam Cannons and missiles, the Type-N is similar to the mass-produced versions utilized by the Cry Wolves squadron and the Type-G has a total of eight Plasma Stakes effective in close-ranged combat. These new frames are interchangeable and become new units for Russel Bergman, Kai Kitamura and Katina Tarask, respectively.
  - The SRG-01-3C Grungust Custom, a custom upgrade of Irmgard Kazahara's Grungust from Super Robot Wars Alpha appears in the game with a different design (despite the Alpha version is a recolor of the Grungust Type-2). This super robot is equipped with Roundel Wings and a pair of Beam Cannons. The unit's design is changed also to incorporate new weapons as well. Despite the Roundel Wings, it can still transform into its Wing Gust and Gust Lander modes.
  - The PTX-014-03C R-Blade Custom, a customized upgrade to Ryusei Date's R-Blade from 3rd Super Robot Wars Alpha: To the End of the Galaxy makes its official debut.
  - The AGX-05 Cybuster gains a new weapon from Masoukishin: The Lord of Elemental, the Vanity Ripper. Also, the storyline of Super Robot Wars EX will be fully fleshed out in the game, including the units Granveil, Wizol, Goddess, Zamzeed, Diablo, Jaohm, and Duraxyll, alongside their respective pilots Huang Yang Long, Saphine Grace, Tyutti Norback, Mio Sasuga, Precia Zan Zenosakis, Gennacy I. Kozireh and Feil-Lord Gran Bilseia. The final boss of EX, the pillar god Volkruss, will also make an appearance.
  - The JakuBuOu and BuJakuOu from the manga Choukijin RyuuKoOh Denki will make their exclusive debut in the series. They were piloted by two new characters who appear to be Servants from the Garden of Baral named Kanan (voiced by Ryoko Nagata) and Taihou (voiced by Kenta Miyake).
  - The antagonist group Zovorg Alliance from 4th Super Robot Wars/Super Robot Wars F/Super Robot Wars F Final will make their exclusive debut in the series, and includes the mecha Calleyzed and Liege Geios along with its pilot Grofis Raclein (voiced by Tomofumi Ikezoe), Justine Chafrois (voiced by Yuuko Mizutani), Zebris Forschwa (voiced by Ryūsuke Ōbayashi) and Teniquette Zezernan (voiced by Masashi Hirose). Other members of the Zovorg Alliance will also make their appearance. The Graterkin 2 also appears with its pilot, Mekibos; however, unlike F Final it becomes a playable unit.
  - Alteur Steinbeck (voiced by Kenji Nomura), one of the many Euzeth Gozzo from Super Hero Operations also appears in the game.
- Additional mecha designed specifically for the game include the following:
  - DGG-XAM03 JinRai
    - The predecessor of the RaiOh, the JinRai is designated as the third Dynamic General Guardian unit created by Dr. Kaoru Tomine, based on designs by Bian Zoldark. It is equipped with the S-ZLAI (Shippuu ZinLai), a special artificial intelligence system which allows it to move without a pilot. Its primary objective is to destroy the Dygenguard and Aussenseiter, the first two Dynamic General Guardians.
  - PTX-006C Wildraubtier Schnabel
    - An upgraded version of the Wildraubtier, this all-range all-purpose unit is equipped with Rail Cannons and a pair of Blade Sai. An additional Tesla Drive is installed for increased speed and mobility. The machine can still transform into its Flyer Mode for increased cruise ability.
  - GSBM-002 Galilnagant
    - A Hi Personal Trooper specially developed for a Psychodriver. It was developed in the Earth Cradle and piloted by the mysterious girl known as Amara (voiced by Haruna Ikezawa) and was designed to destroy the Huckebein series. Its signature weapon is the powerful axe/rifle known as the Bustaxe Gun.
  - YAM-014V Kerbelion Pleasant
    - An Armored Module built up from a test type Guarellion unit, customized specifically for Boosted Children use. The personal unit of Cienne (voiced by Yuka Nagayoshi) customized by the Gaia Sabers, it is usually used for close combat, equipped with two Turnail Crushers for piercing through enemies.
  - SF-35 Cylion
    - A high speed Armored Module created using the data from Project TD's Calion. Its intended to be a next-generation aircraft, however, its specs rival that of Vegalion and it possesses extremely high mobility. It is piloted by Araseri Garcia (voiced by Takashi Matsuyama) a mercenary.
  - EXF-03R Excellence Rescue
    - A new frame of the Excellence created by Tesla Labs for reconnaissance missions. Usually not equipped with the Time Flow Engine like the other frames, the Rescue Frame is the most unique of all the Excellence Frames, utilizing a hovercraft-like design and a pair of beam cannons on its arms. It's also equipped with a Tesla Drive to keep it afloat and grants it aerial capabilities. Unlike the other frames, the Rescue requires three pilots to operate.
  - Masquelion Type-N
    - Next generation armed unit of the independent group GS, manufactured by Isurugi Industries. The Masquereon is a competitive model to Mao Industries Gespensts MK.II M Custom, which is incorporates hardpoints on its armor to suit in different battle situations. Usually all default units were equipped with the Burst Railgun.
  - G-Burnkwaran
    - A super robot unit resembling a delinquent high school guy based on the Dynamic General Guardians piloted by Michiru, Kouta's Rival in school. It boosts excellent offensive and defensive capabilities.

=== Story ===
Aidoneus Island, in the Marquesas Archipelago in the South Pacific, the landing point of "Meteor 3", the same meteor the aliens called the "Aerogators" sent long ago, as well as the primary headquarters of the military association known as the "Divine Crusaders", who threw the Earth Sphere into chaos. The oceanic area around it has been blocked off, and for a time, it has vanished from the stage of history. But behind that stage's curtain, a certain plan has been steadily proceeding.

That plan is to have a special task force which uses ISA tactics (Blitzkrieg operations using mobile battleships that fill the role of an aircraft carrier, and the humanoid mobile weapons placed on board such battleships) and acts according to the will of the President of the Earth Federation Government. It is established under the codename "GS."

"GS" is a military organization independent of the Earth Federation Army, and its primary mission is to carry out special presidential orders concerning military problems. In addition, refortification of Aidoneus Island has been proceeding under the direction of the president's two aides, and on that island, a variety of project deliverables, many new weapons, have been being gathered. However, the true nature of "GS" is being kept secret, and on the surface, it has been designated as an experimental squadron for new weapons. Will "GS" be a new sword to protect the Earth Sphere?

== Series included ==
- Banpresto Originals (Not a TV or movie series)
  - Shin Super Robot Wars
  - Super Robot Wars Gaiden: Masō Kishin – The Lord Of Elemental
  - Choukijin RyuuKoOh Denki (超機人 龍虎王伝奇)
  - Super Robot Wars EX (New)
  - 4th Super Robot Wars/4th Super Robot Wars S (New)
  - Super Robot Wars F
  - Super Robot Wars F Final
  - Super Robot Wars Alpha
  - 2nd Super Robot Wars Alpha
  - 3rd Super Robot Wars Alpha: To the End of the Galaxy
  - Super Robot Wars A
  - Super Robot Wars R
  - Super Hero Operations
  - Hero Senki: Project Olympus
  - Super Robot Wars Impact
  - Compati Hero Series
  - Super Robot Wars MX
  - Super Robot Wars Original Generation: Divine Wars
  - Super Robot Wars Original Generation: The Inspector (New)
  - Super Robot Wars D (New)
  - Real Robot Regiment (New)
  - Lost Children (New)
  - Another Century's Episode Portable (New)

== Music ==
JAM Project, which has performed for other SRW games as well, perform two songs in the game: the opening theme, Wings of the legend, and the ending, Babylon. Both songs were released in December 2012.

== Development ==
Development of the game began in 2010 during the airing of Super Robot Wars Original Generation: The Inspector. During the ending of the final episode of the anime, a small teaser was shown, also advertising the DVD release of the series. The game was first revealed on Famitsu and was planned to be released on the same year. However, the game is delayed according to Terada, stating it'll take time to finish. An official PV is shown at the 2011 Tokyo Game Show revealing the half-finished product.

After a yearlong hiatus, the developers showed the game's third PV as well as the final release date. Alongside the regular edition, the game also comes with two limited edition bundles. The first one includes the Blu-ray box set of Super Robot Wars Original Generation: The Inspector alongside a new casing designed by Ebata Risa. The second one includes a limited edition Gespenst Mk.II Custom model kit painted in Katina's color scheme.

At the 2012 Tokyo Game Show, Terada showed a special gameplay footage of the game, confirming the character's new attacks, game features and confirmed characters.

A downloadable expansion pack for the game called Super Robot Wars Original Generation: Dark Prison (スーパーロボット大戦OG ダークプリズン, Sūpā Robotto Taisen Ōjī Dāku purizun) was released in Spring 2014. The first print versions of Super Robot Wars Original Generation Infinite Battle also includes the expansion pack in a limited basis. Dark Prison details the events of the Shuu Shirakawa route from Super Robot Wars EX, explaining the events regarding his revival, involvement with Volkruss's revival and his alliance with the Steel Dragons. The DLC also includes Selena Recital, one of the main playable characters in 3rd Super Robot Wars Alpha: To the End of the Galaxy, who pilots a customized Gesterbein and Gaen from Masoukishin 2: Revelation of Evil God who pilots the Gadifall.

== Reception ==
Reception

Review score
Publication	Score
Famitsu	35/40

Reception of the game is universally positive by critiques. Famitsu scored the game a 35 out of 40, praising the game's jump to High Definition and retaining the simple gameplay present in the other series while adding new features that won't overshadow the game itself. The game sold well on its first week of release, with a total of 217,710 copies sold in Japan.
