= Keiichi Noda =

Japanese actor, voice actor and narrator

- 野田 圭一
- Born: Seiji Yamane; September 16, 1943 (age 82); Yamaguchi Prefecture, Japan
- Occupations: Actor; voice actor; narrator
- Years active: 1966–present
- Agent: Aoni Production
- Height: 173 cm (5 ft 8 in)

Keiichi Noda (野田 圭一, Noda Keiichi; born September 16, 1943) is a Japanese actor, voice actor and narrator from Yamaguchi Prefecture. He is affiliated with Aoni Production. His real name is Seiji Yamane (山根 征二, Yamane Seiji).

He is most known for the roles of Tetsuya Tsurugi in Great Mazinger, Gantsu Sensei in Ganbare!! Robocon and Shinemon Ninagawa in Ikkyū-san.

== Filmography ==
=== Television animation ===
- Cyborg 009 (1968) – Pyunma/008
- Moretsu Atarou (1969) – Kemunbasu
- Tiger Mask (1969) – Announcer
- Devilman (1972) – Abel, God
- Babel II (1973) – Rodem
- Great Mazinger (1974) – Tetsuya Tsurugi
- Ikkyū-san (1975) – Shinemon Ninagawa
- Maya the Honey Bee (1975) - Schnuck
- Captain Future (1978) – Otho, Narration
- Cyborg 009 (1979) – Jet Link/002
- Dr. Slump (1985) – Dr. Mashirito [4th voice]
- Ginga: Nagareboshi Gin (1986) – Narrator
- Hug! Pretty Cure (2018) - Bakuhatsu Aisaki
- Saint Seiya (1986) – Cepheus Albiore
- Transformers: The Headmasters (1987) – Shouki/Raiden
- Transformers: Super God Masterforce (1988) – Narrator, Giga, Overlord
- Mahoromatic (2001) – Slash
- One Piece (2003) – Saint Jaygarcia Saturn
- This Ugly Yet Beautiful World (2004) – Ioneos

=== OVA ===
- 2001 Nights (1987) – Clarke
- Legend of the Galactic Heroes (1989) – Fritz Josef Bittenfeld
- Transformers: Zone (1990) – Narrator, Overlord

=== Theatrical animation ===
- Flying Phantom Ship (1969) – Announcer
- Kinnikuman: Great Riot! Seigi Choujin (1984) – Shishkeba Boo
- Mai Mai Miracle (2009) – Kotaro Aoki
- Detective Conan: The Lost Ship in the Sky (2010) – Takamichi Fujioka

=== Video games ===
- Xenosaga Series (xxxx-xx) – Johachim Mizrahi
- Gungriffon (1996) – Narrator
- Super Robot Wars F (1997) - Tetsuya Tsurugi
- Super Robot Wars F Final (1998) - Tetsuya Tsurugi
- Super Robot Wars Complete Box (1999) - Tetsuya Tsurugi
- Super Robot Wars 64 (1999) - Tetsuya Tsurugi
- Super Robot Wars Alpha (2000) - Tetsuya Tsurugi
- Super Robot Wars Alpha Gaiden (2001) - Tetsuya Tsurugi
- Super Robot Wars Impact (2002) - Tetsuya Tsurugi
- 2nd Super Robot Wars Alpha (2003) - Tetsuya Tsurugi
- Super Robot Wars MX (2004) - Tetsuya Tsurugi
- 3rd Super Robot Wars Alpha: To the End of the Galaxy (2005) - Tetsuya Tsurugi
- Ultraman Fighting Evolution Rebirth (2005) – Captain Pilot
- Real Robot Regiment (2005) – Tetsuya Tsurugi
- Super Robot Wars A Portable (2008) - Tetsuya Tsurugi
- Super Robot Wars Z (2008) - Tetsuya Tsurugi
- Persona 5 (2016) – Toranouske Yoshida
- Super Robot Wars X (2018) - Hopes

=== Tokusatsu ===
- Gamera vs. Zigra (1971) – voice of Zigra
- Hikari no Senshi Diamond Eye (1973) – voice of Diamond Eye (Ep8 - 26)
- Robot Detective (1973) – Narrator
- Ganbare!! Robokon (1974) – voice of Gantz-sensei
- Moero!! Robokon (1999) – voice of Gantz-sensei
- Super Sentai series

- Hyakujuu Sentai GaoRanger (2001) – voice of Christmas Org
- Tokusou Sentai Dekaranger (2004) – voice of Speckionian Jenio
- Mahou Sentai Magiranger (2005) – voice of Heavenly Saint Chronogel

=== Dubbing ===
- 2010 (1990 TBS edition) – HAL 9000
- The Blob (1972 NTV edition) – Officer Ritchie (George Karas)
- Bonnie and Clyde (1974 TV Asahi edition) – Eugene Grizzard (Gene Wilder)
- Dragon Fist – Fang Gang (James Tien)
- Thunderbirds – Thomas Prescott
