= Super Robot Wars OG Gaiden =

2007 video game

- Developer(s): Banpresoft
- Publisher(s): Banpresto
- Platform(s): PlayStation 2
- Release: JP: December 27, 2007
- Genre(s): Tactical role-playing
- Mode(s): Single Player

Super Robot Wars OG Gaiden (スーパーロボット大戦OG外伝, Sūpā Robotto Taisen Ōjī Gaiden) is a 2007 tactical role-playing game, and direct sequel to Super Robot Taisen: Original Generations, for the PlayStation 2. The bonus segments of Original Generations, entitled Original Generation 2.5: Unified Wisdom, was regarded as a preview for Original Generation Gaiden. The game resolves many matters left unchecked at the end of Original Generation 2.5, such as one of the main antagonist's unfinished plan and the activities of one of the enemy factions.

== Gameplay ==
The same tactical gameplay from Original Generations is carried over to Original Generation Gaiden, along with the Twin Battle System and Twin Command game mechanics.

The first of two new gameplay features in Original Generation Gaiden is a card battling mini-game, entitled, Shuffler Battle Mode. Separate from the main game, this unique card game allows the player to play against the computer using trading cards representing various characters and mechs in the Original Generation games, played in the style of traditional collectible card games. The second gameplay feature is the inclusion of a Free Battle Mode, where the player is given the freedom of setting their own scenario, placing which allied or enemy characters and mechs on the field in a specific environment.

=== Changes And Additions ===
Like Original Generations, Original Generation Gaiden includes new content, in the form of new characters and mecha, but also provides additions to existing characters and mechs.

- New mecha and characters from new series for the game include the following:
  - Fighter Roar's sister, Emi, from The Great Battle IV, piloting the G Thundergate. Dark Brain, Warrior Roar's nemesis, makes an appearance, as well.
    - Emi manifests itself inside a human, who is Kouta's sister, Shouko Azuma.
  - Raul Gureden and his sister, Fiona Gureden, the protagonists of Super Robot Wars R pilot the final frames for their Excellence units: the EXF-02L Excellence Lightning and the EXF-02E Excellence Eternal, respectively. Duminas, the antagonist of R, returns with its upgraded form in the later parts of the game.
  - Folka Albark, protagonist of Super Robot Wars Compact 3, receives the Shinka Ialdabaoth as his new unit in the game.
  - Shura Generals Altis Tarl, Magnus Ald and Maythis Mark from Compact 3 pilot their personal Shura Gods, the Mardikt, the Andras and the Peirines, respectively. Shura King Alkaid Nassh and his advisor, Mizal Touval, also appear with their Extim and Glasyalabolas Shura Gods.
  - Hugo Medio, one of two protagonists of Super Robot Wars MX, appears in scattered missions, piloting a Gespenst MK II M Custom. Albero Esto, one of the game's main antagonists, is also playable, along with his son, Foglia Esto, who is only mentioned in MX. Their story takes place before the destruction of their squadron, which occurs before the MX storyline.
- Additional mecha designed specifically for the game include the following:
  - Gespenst MK II M Custom
    - A heavily customized Gespenst for Kai Kitamura and painted in his signature colors, this unit mounts "Plasma Bucklers" on both arms and utilizes more grappling and martial arts techniques, as per his combat style.
- Several existing units gain new variations, such as Sanger Zonvolt's DGG-XAM1 Dygenguard, which can, for the first time in the series, utilize its previously disabled "default" weapons as an alternative to its "Colossal Blade" attacks.
  - Existing units also receive new attack animation sequences, such as the "Akashic Buster" performed by the Cybuster and the "Twin Bird Strike" combination attack performed by the Wild Wurger and Wild Falken.
- Some characters make their debut appearance in the Original Generation universe in Original Generation Gaiden, albeit, in cameo appearances:
  - Aqua Centrum, the second protagonist of Super Robot Wars MX, and Eldy Mitte, another MX antagonist.
  - Touma Kanou, the male super robot protagonist in the 3rd Super Robot Wars Alpha: To the End of the Galaxy.

== Storyline ==
The Shadow-Mirror is destroyed, the Inspectors are defeated and the threat of the extraterrestrial Einst is over. Although it appears the Earth can enjoy a relative peace, something dark and sinister looms over the horizon. A relatively small and unknown conglomerate, Wong Heavy Industries, introduces its new mech for the Earth Federation Army, the VTX-001 Bartoll. However, as this unit is mass-produced, large number of civilians around the world go missing and giant, humanoid machines not of Earth origin appear out of nowhere and attack Asakusa City.

Like before, mysterious beings behind the shadows are at work again, along with strange, new forces distorting the laws of physics, space-time and reality. As former heroes confront these turn of events, new ones will emerge to stand up alongside them against the darkness. Familiar faces make a return, while some will appear most unexpectedly, as the Earth and its citizens find itself yet in another struggle for freedom and destiny...

== Series Included In Super Robot Wars Original Generation Gaiden ==
- Banpresto Originals (Not a TV or movie series)
  - Shin Super Robot Wars
  - Super Robot Wars Gaiden: Masō Kishin - The Lord of Elemental
  - Choukijin RyuuKoOh Denki (超機人 龍虎王伝奇)
  - 3rd Super Robot Wars
  - Super Robot Wars F
  - Super Robot Wars F Final
  - Super Robot Wars Alpha
  - Super Robot Wars Alpha Gaiden
  - 2nd Super Robot Wars Alpha
  - Super Robot Wars Compact 2
  - Super Robot Wars Impact
  - Super Hero Operations
  - Hero Senki: Project Olympus
  - Super Robot Wars A
  - The Great Battle IV
  - Super Robot Wars R
  - Super Robot Wars Compact 3
  - Super Robot Wars Scramble Commander
  - Super Robot Wars Original Generation: The Animation
  - Super Robot Wars Original Generation: The Sound Cinema
  - Super Robot Wars Original Generation Chronicle (Stories first published in the Super Robot Wars Dengeki Comics)
  - 3rd Super Robot Wars Alpha: To the End of the Galaxy
  - Super Robot Wars: Original Generations
  - Super Robot Wars MX (New)
