= JAM Project =

Japanese anime song supergroup

- JAM Project in San Francisco, CA in August 2015. Left to right: Fukuyama, Kageyama, Okui, Kitadani, Endoh.

Background information
- Origin: Tokyo, Japan
- Genres: Anison; tokuson; VGM; pop rock; hard rock; heavy metal; progressive rock
- Years active: 2000–present
- Labels: Victor, Lantis, HS Record
- Members: Hironobu Kageyama; Masaaki Endoh; Hiroshi Kitadani; Masami Okui; Yoshiki Fukuyama; Ricardo Cruz
- Past members: Eizo Sakamoto; Rica Matsumoto; Ichirou Mizuki
- Website: http://www.jamjamsite.com/

JAM Project ("JAM" standing for "Japan Animationsong Makers") are a Japanese anison band founded on July 19, 2000, by anison singer Ichirou Mizuki. The band is composed of many vocal artists well known in the anime music industry. Aside from the many anime, tokusatsu, and video game theme songs the band has performed together, each member is famous for their own solo performances of Japanese theme songs. JAM Project is known to worldwide audiences for their theme music contributions to Garo and One-Punch Man.

JAM Project answering questions from American fans at the 7th annual J-Pop Summit in San Francisco, California

== History ==
JAM Project was founded in 2000 by veteran singer Ichirou Mizuki, who sought to revitalize the fiery spirit of earlier anime songs. He recruited fellow veterans of that space, including Hironobu Kageyama and Masaaki Endoh, who remain members of the group.

The following year, JAM Project began a long association with the Super Robot Wars franchise, performing "Hagane no Messiah" for the PlayStation game "Super Robot Wars Alpha Gaiden." In 2002, Mizuki and Eizo Sakamoto stepped back from the group but three members would join. Masami Okui had released a number of albums and had performed openings for shows including Slayers and Revolutionary Girl Utena. Hiroshi Kitadani, previously a member of the bands Stagger and Lapis Lazuli, entered the world of anime songs via One Piece and its first of several opening themes he has performed for the long-running series. Yoshiki Fukuyama, like Kageyama, Endoh and Mizuki, was a veteran of the anime world. In the 1990s, he was the singing voice of Basara Nekki in Macross 7.

In 2005, the group began another long association with the Garo franchise, writing opening themes for nearly all iterations of the franchise, both anime and live-action. Kageyama voices Madou Ring Zaruba in every release of the show.

In 2007, JAM Project announced plans to perform outside East Asia. Since 2008, the group has performed internationally with regularity, in cities such as Baltimore, Washington, Rotterdam, Abu Dhabi and Paris, typically in conjunction with anime conventions. 2008 also marked the release of "No Border," their first single not connected with an anime or video game.

In the summer of 2012, they teamed up with Animetal USA for a limited national concert tour called the Japan-America Anison Summit (日米アニソンサミット, Nichi-Bei Anison Samitto). From 2011 to 2014, Japanese composer and conductor Takayuki Hattori served as orchestral arranger on several albums and tours.

In 2015, JAM Project celebrated its 15th anniversary with a series of concerts that contained 39 songs in its setlist chosen from all their previous albums, the most songs in any of their concerts to date. They also released a CD based on a new ultra-high quality (UHQ CD) standard containing re-arranged and re-recorded hits voted on by fans. The same year, the group exposed itself to a new audience through "THE HERO! ~Ikareru Kobushi ni Honō wo Tsukero~" (lit. "Set Fire To The Furious Fist)", their opening for the first season of One-Punch Man. The music video, filmed in San Francisco, has accumulated more than 50 million views on YouTube.

In 2020, the group celebrated its 20th anniversary with the release of the album The Age of Dragon Knights. JAM Project worked with prominent peers, including Yuki Kajiura, GRANRODEO, ALI PROJECT, angela and members of FLOW. The group also released JAM Project 20th Anniversary Complete BOX, which includes all of the group's albums, a collection of its foreign-language recordings, Blu-rays of a concert and other footage, and a 300-page booklet.

The COVID-19 pandemic caused a planned tour to be scuttled. Kageyama, however, credited the unplanned break with rejuvenating the band's creative drive. That rebirth is the subject of the 2021 documentary Get Over -- JAM Project the Movie.

On January 22, 2026, Capcom announced JAM Project would provide the theme for Alex in downloadable content for Street Fighter 6. The song is titled "GO! ALEX!〜 Kibō tanjō 〜" (GO! ALEX! Hope is born).

The group's producer is Shunji Inoue, the founder of Lantis and a former bandmate of Kageyama. JAM Project is managed by HIGHWAY STAR, which also represents Kageyama, Endoh and Kitadani in their solo careers. In 2021, HIGHWAY STAR spun off from Bandai Namco, with the new business including Lantis recording and production assets, and relationships with artists including JAM Project.

== Members ==
- Hironobu Kageyama – founding member
- Masaaki Endoh – founding member
- Hiroshi Kitadani – joined in June 2002
- Masami Okui – joined in March 2003
- Yoshiki Fukuyama – joined in March 2003
- Ricardo Cruz (semi-regular member) – joined in June 2005.

Cruz occasionally composes and performs with the group. He is heard on songs including "Neppu! Shippu! Cybuster," "Gong," "Stormbringer," "Sempre Sonhando 〜Yume Oibito〜" and "Seijaku no Apostle"

=== Former members ===
- Eizo Sakamoto – founding member; stopped activity with the band in March 2003 prior to Fukuyama and Okui's joining, referring to it as "Graduation" (卒業, Sotsugyō). He returned to perform in the band's 10th anniversary reunion concert in 2010.
- Rica Matsumoto – founding member; announced on April 7, 2008, that she was taking time off from the band to focus on her solo work, since becoming an indefinite hiatus. She returned briefly in 2010 to help write the 10th anniversary version of "KI・ZU・NA" on the album MAXIMIZER ~Decade of Evolution~.
- Ichirou Mizuki – founding member; formally reduced his status to "part-time member" in August 2002, following the band's second live concert. He returned to sing in the single "Stormbringer" in 2006. He also returned to perform in the band's 10th anniversary reunion concert in 2010. The singer died on December 6, 2022, due to lung cancer.

== Discography ==
=== Albums ===
==== Studio albums ====
Title	Album details	Peak chart positions	
Title	Album details	JPN Oricon	JPN Billboard
JAM First Process	Released: March 21, 2002; Label: Victor Entertainment; Format: CD	—	—
Maximizer ~Decade of Evolution~	Released: June 9, 2010 (Note: JAM Project's second original album, tied in with their 2010 World Tour.); Label: Lantis; Formats: CD, digital download	18	21
Victoria Cross	Released: April 6, 2011 (Note: Symphonic arrangement album; originally set to be released on March 23, 2011; postponed to April 6, 2011, due to the 2011 Tōhoku earthquake and tsunami.); Label: Lantis; Formats: CD, digital download	38	34
Thumb Rise Again	Released: October 23, 2013 (Note: Tied in with their 2013-2014 live tour of the same name. Recorded in Los Angeles, with over 70 musicians participating. The name is a play on words on the Japanese transliteration of the phrase "samurais again". The logo for the tour often depicts the silhouette of a samurai holding a thumbs-up.); Label: Lantis; Formats: CD, digital download	21	22
Area Z	Released: June 29, 2016 (Note: The album is so named because the letter "z" is the final letter of the English alphabet, implying that JAM Project aims to reach a higher level.); Label: Lantis; Formats: CD, digital download	23	24
Tokyo Dive	Released: October 18, 2017 (Note: Contains the song "EMG", used as the opening song for Garo: Vanishing Line.); Label: Lantis; Formats: CD, digital download	24	23
The Age of Dragon Knights	Released: January 1, 2020; Label: Lantis; Formats: CD, digital download	40	29
The Judgement	Released: September 28, 2022; Label: Lantis; Formats: CD, digital download	41	55
"—" denotes a release that did not chart.

==== Best albums ====
Title	Album details	Peak chart positions	
Title	Album details	JPN Oricon	JPN Billboard
Best Project ~JAM Project Best Collection~	Released: March 6, 2002; Label: Lantis; Format: CD	—	—
Freedom ~JAM Project Best Collection II~	Released: September 3, 2003; Label: Lantis; Format: CD	—	—
JAM-ism ~JAM Project Best Collection III~	Released: September 23, 2004; Label: Lantis; Formats: CD, digital download	—	—
Olympia ~JAM Project Best Collection IV~	Released: April 5, 2006; Label: Lantis; Formats: CD, digital download	37	—
Big Bang ~JAM Project Best Collection V~	Released: July 4, 2007; Label: Lantis; Formats: CD, digital download	39	—
Get over the Border ~JAM Project Best Collection VI~	Released: August 6, 2008; Label: Lantis; Formats: CD, digital download	24	54
Seventh Explosion ~JAM Project Best Collection VII~	Released: November 25, 2009; Label: Lantis; Formats: CD, digital download	38	50
Going ~JAM Project Best Collection VIII~	Released: May 11, 2011; Label: Lantis; Formats: CD, digital download	12	9
The Monsters ~JAM Project Best Collection IX~	Released: November 14, 2012; Label: Lantis; Formats: CD, digital download	24	21
X Cures Earth ~JAM Project Best Collection X~ (Note: The name is a play on words on the Japanese transliteration of "excuse us", came to be when Kitadani messed up his English in an airport while the group was on tour, as explained in a live concert.)	Released: July 2, 2014; Label: Lantis; Formats: CD, digital download	28	26
X Less Force ~JAM Project Best Collection XI~ (Note: The name is a play on the phrase "timeless force", where the written equivalent for multiplication (times) is also known as the letter "x", and the first two letters of the title resemble the Roman numerals for eleven when placed close together.)	Released: June 17, 2015; Label: Lantis; Formats: CD, digital download	21	18
Thunderbird ~JAM Project Best Collection XII~	Released: November 2, 2016; Label: Lantis; Formats: CD, digital download	30	25
A-Rock ~JAM Project Best Collection XIII~	Released: October 31, 2018; Label: Lantis; Formats: CD, digital download	24	19
Max the Max ~JAM Project Best Collection XIV~	Released: July 27, 2022; Label: Lantis; Formats: CD, digital download		
"—" denotes a release that did not chart.

=== Singles ===
#	Single title	Anime/Video Game/Tokusatsu	Year	Peak position	Sales	Album
#	Single title	Anime/Video Game/Tokusatsu	Year	JPN	Sales	Album
1	"Kaze ni Nare" (疾風になれ; "The Wind Blows") (featuring Rica Matsumoto & Hironobu Kageyama)	éX-Driver (OP)	2000	—	—	Best Project
2	"Danger Zone" (featuring Eizo Sakamoto & Masaaki Endoh)	éX-Driver Movie (OP)	2000	—	—	Best Project
3	"Storm" (featuring Ichirou Mizuki & Hironobu Kageyama)	Shin Getter Robo vs Neo Getter Robo (OP)	2000	—	—	Best Project
4	"Soultaker"	The SoulTaker (OP)	2001	—	—	Best Project
5	"Hagane no Messiah" (鋼の救世主（メシア), "Steel Messiah")	Super Robot Wars Alpha Gaiden (OP)	2001	75	—	Best Project
6	"Fire Wars" (featuring Hironobu Kageyama)	Mazinkaiser (OP)	2001	—	—	Best Project
7	"Crush Gear Fight!"	Crush Gear Turbo (OP)	2001	—	—	Best Project
8	"Over the Top!" (featuring Eizo Sakamoto, Masaaki Endoh & Hironobu Kageyama)	Kikou Busou G-Breaker (OP)	2001	—	—	Best Project
9	"Lady Fighter!" (featuring Rica Matsumoto)	Sunrise Eiyuutan (OP)	2001	—	—	Best Project
10	"Kaze no Eagle" (風のEAGLE, "Wind Eagle") (featuring Hironobu Kageyama)	Crush Gear Turbo (insert song)	2002	—	—	Freedom
11	"Go!"	Super Robot Wars Impact (OP)	2002	72	—	Freedom
12	"Get up Crush Fighter!" (featuring Hironobu Kageyama, Rica Matsumoto, Eizo Sakamoto & Masaaki Endoh)	Crush Gear Turbo Movie (OP)	2002	—	—	Freedom
13	"Nageki no Rosario" (嘆きのロザリオ, "Grief Rosary")	Gravion (OP)	2002	58	—	Freedom
14	"Go! Go! Rescue" (Go!Go!レスキュー, Gō! Gō! Resukyū) "March of Rescue Hero" (マーチ オブ レスキューヒーロー) BY JAM Project (ED) (featuring Hiroshi Kitadani, Masaaki Endoh & Rica Matsumoto)	Machine Robo Rescue (OP) ED	2003	120	—	Freedom
15	"Little Wing" (featuring Masami Okui)	Scrapped Princess (OP) / Galaxy Angel AA (ED)	2003	45	7,778	Freedom
16	"Skill"	2nd Super Robot Wars Alpha (OP)	2003	25	7,447	Freedom
17	"The Gate of the Hell" (featuring Yoshiki Fukuyama)	Mazinkaiser vs. the Great General of Darkness ((OP)	2003	88	—	Jam-ism
18	"Destination" (featuring Rica Matsumoto)	Sunrise World War (OP)	2003	84	—	Jam-ism
19	"Kurenai no Kiba" (紅ノ牙; "Crimson Fang")	Gravion Zwei (OP)	2004	37	12,089	Jam-ism
20	"Victory"	Super Robot Wars MX (OP)	2004	38	8,912	Jam-ism
21	"Dragon"	New Getter Robo (OP)	2004	64	4,068	Jam-ism
22	"Voyager"	Panda-Z (OP)	2004	88	3,253	Jam-ism
23	"Genkai Battle" (限界バトル, "Battle Limit")	Yu-Gi-Oh! GX (ED)	2004	115	2,251	Olympia
24	"Muv-Luv Alternative Insertion Song Collection"	Muv-Luv	2005	40	5728	Olympia
25	"Meikyū no Prisoner" (迷宮のプリズナー, "Labyrinth Prisoner")	Super Robot Wars Original Generation: The Animation (OP)	2005	68	7,092	Olympia
26	"Gong"	3rd Super Robot Wars Alpha: To the End of the Galaxy (OP)	2005	22	16,250	Olympia
27	"Garo ~Savior in the Dark~" (牙狼～Savior in the Dark～)	Garo (TV series) (OP2)	2006	41	6,983	Olympia
28	"Break Out"	Super Robot Wars OG: Divine Wars (OP1)	2006	24	12,243	Big Bang
29	"Rising Force"	Super Robot Wars OG: Divine Wars (OP2)	2007	40	6,441	Big Bang
30	"Stormbringer"	Kotetsushin Jeeg (OP)	2007	71	2,553	Big Bang
31	"Divine love" (featuring Hiroshi Kitadani)	Saint Beast (OP)	2007	74	2,336	Big Bang
32	"Dragon Storm 2007"		2007	—	—	Big Bang
33	"Rocks"	Super Robot Wars: OG (PS2 OP)	2007	36	6,675	Get over the Border
34	"No Border"		2008	44	4,032	Get over the Border
35	"Crest of "Z's""	Super Robot Wars Z (OP)	2008	40	4,703	Seventh Explosion
36	"Hello Darwin! ~Kōkishin on Demand~" (ハローダーウィン!～好奇心オンデマンド～, "Hello Darwin! ~Curiosity on Demand~")	Sgt. Frog (OP9)	2008	76	2,177	Seventh Explosion
37	"Space Roller Coster Go Go!" (featuring Nice Girl μ)	Keroro Gunso the Super Movie 4: Gekishin Dragon Warriors (OP)	2009	115	766	Seventh Explosion
38	"Rescue Fire" (レスキューファイアー, Resukyū Faiā)	Tomica Hero: Rescue Fire (OP1)	2009	62	3,713	Seventh Explosion
39	"Shugoshin-The Guardian" (守護神-The Guardian)	Mazinger Edition Z: The Impact! (OP)	2009	45	4,384	Seventh Explosion
40	"Battle No Limit!"	Battle Spirits Shounen Gekiha Dan (OP)	2009	56	1,680	Seventh Explosion
41	"Bōken Ō ~Across the legendary kingdom~" (冒険王 ～Across the legendary kingdom～, "Adventure King ~Across the Legendary Kingdom~")	Ragnarok Online (image song)	2009	18	4,867	Going
42	"Baku-chin Kan-ryo! Rescue Fire" (爆鎮完了！レスキューファイアー, "Explosive Extinguishing Complete! Rescue Fire")	Tomica Hero: Rescue Fire (OP)	2009	63	1,578	Going
43	"Transformers Evo."	Transformers: Animated (OP)	2010	47	3,337	Going
44	"Maxon"	Super Robot Wars Original Generation: The Inspector (OP)	2010	36	5,105	Going
45	"Vanguard"	Cardfight!! Vanguard (OP1)	2011	53	3,259	Going
46	"Noah"	2nd Super Robot Wars Z: Hakai-hen (OP)	2011	40	3,283	The Monsters
47	"Believe in My Existence"	Cardfight!! Vanguard (OP2)	2011	19	8,502	The Monsters
48	"Waga Na wa Garo" (我が名は牙狼; "My Name is Garo")	Garo: Makai Senki (OP/ED)	2012	22	6,481	The Monsters
49	"Limit Break"	Cardfight!! Vanguard (OP3)	2012	42	3,826	The Monsters
50	"Hagane no Resistance" (鋼のレジスタンス, "Steel Resistance")	2nd Super Robot Wars Z: Saisei-hen (OP)	2012	41	4,277	The Monsters
51	"Wings of the Legend"	2nd Super Robot Wars Original Generation (OP/ED)	2012	37	3,112	X Cures Earth
52	"Yume Sketch" (夢スケッチ, "Dream Sketch")	Bakuman 3 (ED2)	2013	75	1,069	X Cures Earth
53	"R.I.P ~Tomo yo Shizuka ni Nemure~" (R.I.P～友よ静かに眠れ～; "R.I.P ~Sleep Quietly My Friend~")	Space Battleship Yamato 2199 (ED6)	2013	51	1,951	X Cures Earth
54	"Isshokusokuhatsu ~Trigger of Crisis~" (一触即発 ～Trigger of Crisis～; "Critical Situation ~Trigger of Crisis~")	Garo: Yami o Terasu Mono (OP)	2013	46	2,155	X Cures Earth
55	"Rebellion ~Hangyaku no senshi-tachi~" (Rebellion〜反逆の戦士達〜; "Rebellion ~Warriors of the Rebellion~")	3rd Super Robot Wars Z: Jigoku-hen (OP)	2014	40	2,832	X Less Force
56	"Breakthrough"	Nobunaga the Fool (OP2)	2014	44	2,394	X Less Force
57	"Raiga ~Tusk of thunder~" (雷牙〜Tusk of thunder〜; "Kaminari Kiba ~Tusk of thunder~")	Garo: Makai no Hana (OP2)	2014	53	2,605	X Less Force
58	"Honō no Kokuin -DIVINE FLAME-" (炎の刻印-DIVINE FLAME-, "Mark of the Flame -DIVINE FLAME-")	Garo: The Carved Seal of Flames (OP1)	2014	52	1,258	X Less Force
59	"B.B."	Garo: The Carved Seal of Flames (OP2)	2015	62	1,286	Thunderbird
60	"Kessen the Final Round" (決戦 the Final Round, "Showdown: the Final Round")	3rd Super Robot Wars Z: Tengoku-hen (OP)	2015	44	1,724	Thunderbird
61	"EMERGE ~Shikkoku no Tsubasa~" (EMERGE～漆黒の翼～, "EMERGE ~Jet Black Wings~")	Garo: Gold Storm Sho (OP)	2015	50	1,261	Thunderbird
62	"THE HERO! ~Ikareru Kobushi ni Honō wo Tsukero~" (THE HERO! ～怒れる拳に火をつけろ～, The Hero! ~Set Fire to the Furious Fist~)	One-Punch Man (OP1 / S1 OP)	2015	19	100,000+	Thunderbird
63	"Cyborg 009 ~Nine Cyborg Soldiers~/DEVILMIND ~Ai wa Chikara〜~" (サイボーグ009〜Nine Cyborg Soldiers〜/DEVILMIND〜愛は力〜, "Cyborg 009 ~Nine Cyborg Soldiers~ / DEVILMIND ~The Power of Love~")	Cyborg 009 VS Devilman (OP)	2015	—	—	Thunderbird
64	"Guren no Tsuki ~Kakusareshi Yami Monogatari~" (紅蓮ノ月～隠されし闇物語～, "Crimson Moon ~A Hidden Tale of Darkness~")	Garo: Crimson Moon (OP1)	2015	44	1,546	Thunderbird
65	"Gekka" (月華; "Moonlight")	Garo: Crimson Moon (OP2)	2016	65	870	Thunderbird
66	"Shining Storm ~Rekka no Gotoku~" (Shining Storm ~烈火の如く~, "Shining Storm ~Like the Raging Flames~")	Super Robot Wars Original Generation: Moon Dwellers (OP)	2016	70	1,531	Thunderbird
67	"The Brave"	Yūsha Yoshihiko (OP3)	2016	50	2,504	A-Rock
68	"Dragonflame"	Zero: Dragon Blood (OP)	2017	70	1,088	A-Rock
69	"The Exceeder / New Blue"	Super Robot Wars V (OP/ED)	2017	61	1,214	A-Rock
70	"Hagane no Warriors/The Oath ~ Yoake no Chikai ~" (鋼のWarriors/The Oath 〜夜明けの誓い〜, "Steel Warriors/The Oath ~ Oath of Dawn ~")	Super Robot Wars X (OP/ED)	2018	62	—	A-Rock
71	"Tread on the Tiger’s Tail/RESET/D.D～Dimension Driver～"	Super Robot Wars T (OP/ED) / Super Robot Wars DD (OP)	2019	—	—	Max the Max
72	"Seijaku no Apostle" (静寂のアポストル, "Apostle of Silence") (English title: "Uncrowned Greatest Hero")	One-Punch Man (OP2 / S2 OP)	2019	50	1,212	Max the Max
73	"Bloodlines ~Unmei no Kettō~" (Bloodlines〜運命の血統〜, "Bloodlines ~Fated Liniage~")	Getter Robo Arc (OP/ED4)	2021	—	—	Max the Max
74	"Drei Kreuz ~Hagane no Survivor~" (Drei Kreuz〜鋼のサバイバー〜, "Drei Kreuz ~Survivors of Steel~")	Super Robot Wars 30 (OP/ED)	2021	—	—	Max the Max
75	"Akatsuki o Ute" (暁を撃て, "Shot at Dawn")	Muv-Luv Alternative (OP)	2022	—	—	TBA
76	"Soreha Kegare Naki Shura no Namida" (其れは穢れなき修羅の涙, "Those are the Pure Tears of Shura") (featuring Yuki Kajiura)	Garo: Hagane o Tsugu Mono (OP/ED)	2024	—	—	TBA
77	"Get No Satisfied!" (featuring Babymetal)	One-Punch Man (OP3 / S3 OP)	2025	—	—	TBA
"—" denotes a release that did not chart, did chart but no sales records are available, or were not released in that region.

=== DVDs and Blu-rays ===
Title	Details	Peak chart position
Title	Details	JPN
JAM Project 3rd Live Shinkan ~Return to the Chaos~	Released: January 1, 2004; Label: Lantis; Format: DVD	—
JAM Project 4th Live Victory ~A Once in a Lifetime Chance~	Released: February 23, 2005; Label: Lantis; Format: DVD	—
JAM Project 5th Anniversary Live ~King Gong~	Released: April 5, 2006; Label: Lantis; Format: DVD	72
JAM Project Japan Circuit 2007 ~Break Out~	Released: July 4, 2007 (Note: Ricardo Cruz appeared as part of JAM Project for the first time.); Label: Lantis; Format: DVD	42
JAM Project Japan Flight 2008 ~No Border~	Released: August 6, 2008 (Note: This tour was Rica Matsumoto's last live appearance with JAM Project.); Label: Lantis; Format: DVD	27
JAM Project Hurricane Tour ~Gate of the Future~	Released: September 25, 2009; Label: Lantis; Format: DVD, Blu-ray	32
JAM Project Live 2010 Maximizer ~Decade of Evolution~	Released: January 26, 2010; Label: Lantis; Format: DVD, Blu-ray	34
JAM Project Symphonic Concert 2011	Released: October 22, 2011 (Note: Conducted by Takayuki Hattori, the set contained symphonic arrangements of several popular songs and featured solos for each member, including an arrangement of the main theme of Karei-naru Ichizoku with the addition of Endoh on vocals.); Label: Lantis; Format: DVD	—
JAM Project Live 2011–2012 Go! Go! Going!! ~Fumetsu no Zipang~	Released: August 1, 2012 (Note: The tour was titled "Arigato Tomodachi" for legs outside Japan.); Label: Lantis; Formats: DVD, Blu-ray	69
JAM Project Premium Live 2013 ~The Monster's Party~	Released: July 24, 2013 (Note: JAM Project introduced an alter ego band called "The Monsters".); Label: Lantis; Formats: DVD, Blu-ray	67
JAM Project Live 2013–2014 Thumb Rise Again	Released: July 23, 2014 (Note: Conductor Hattori conducted the opening number "Groundbreakers" and several songs featured a string quartet.); Label: Lantis; Formats: DVD, Blu-ray	61
JAM Project 15th Anniversary Premium Live The Stronger’s Party	Released: May 11, 2016 (Note: This concert featured JAM Project on a circular stage in the center of the arena.); Label: Lantis; Formats: DVD, Blu-ray	28
JAM Project Live Tour 2016 Area Z	Released: May 24, 2017; Label: Lantis; Formats: DVD, Blu-ray	71 (DVD); 37 (BD)
JAM Project JAPAN TOUR 2017-2018 TOKYO DIVE	Released: September 19, 2018; Label: Lantis; Formats: DVD, Blu-ray	60 (DVD); 15 (BD)
JAM Project LIVE TOUR 2022 THE JUDGEMENT	Released: April 5, 2023; Label: Lantis; Formats: Blu-ray	20
"—" denotes a release that did not chart.

=== Compilations ===
Title	Album details	Peak chart positions	
Title	Album details	JPN Oricon	JPN Billboard
Super Robot Wars Alpha Original Story D-2 (with Various Artists)	Released: May 23, 2001; Label: Lantis; Formats: CD, digital download	—	—
Emblem (エンブレム, Enburemu)	Released: March 8, 2006 (Note: TV anime Yomigaeru Sora – Rescue Wings ending theme, insert & image song collection.); Label: Lantis; Formats: CD, digital download	107	—
Muv-Luv Alternative Collection of Standard Edition Songs "Name" (with Various Artists)	Released: December 6, 2006; Label: Lantis; Format: CD	—	—
Lucky Star Re-Mix002 ~Lucky Star no Kiwami, Ahh Shiteyanyo~ (with Various Artists)	Released: December 26, 2007; Label: Lantis; Formats: CD, digital download	5	—
JAM Project World Flight 2008 Best Selection	Released: August 8, 2008; Label: Lantis; Format: CD	—	—
Super Robot Wars JAM Project Songs	Released: December 25, 2008; Label: Lantis; Formats: CD, digital download	89	—
Uchū o Kakeru Shōjo Original Soundtrack Vol. 1 (with Various Artists)	Released: March 25, 2009; Label: Lantis; Format: CD	—	—
Nico Nico Douga Selection ~Sainō no Mudazukai~ (ニコニコ動画せれくちょん～才能の無駄遣い～, Nico Nico Douga Selection: A Waste of Talent) (with Various Artists)	Released: July 1, 2009; Label: Lantis; Formats: CD, digital download	38	64
Gundam Tribute from Lantis (ガンダムトリビュート from Lantis, Gandamu Toribyūto from Lantis) (with Various Artists)	Released: December 9, 2009; Label: Lantis; Format: CD	35	—
JAM Project 10th Anniversary Complete Box	Released: December 22, 2010 (Note: The 10th anniversary box set release from JAM Project featuring 7 greatest hits albums; a bonus CD containing English, Portuguese, and Chinese versions of several of their songs in addition to any songs they recorded or performed that were not included on any of their other singles and albums; and 4 DVDs featuring all the music videos they created and footage of their live performance, including a reunion concert with Ichiro Mizuki, Ricardo Cruz, and Eizo Sakamoto. It also includes a 200-page JAM Project history book.); Label: Lantis; Format: CD	43	31
Super Robot Wars x JAM Project Opening Theme Collection Album Max the Power (スーパーロボット大戦×JAM Project OPENING THEME COLLECTION ALBUM MAX THE POWER, Sūpā Robotto Taisen x JAM Project OPENING THEME COLLECTION ALBUM MAX THE POWER)	Released: December 26, 2012; Label: Lantis; Formats: CD, digital download	65	—
GARO Golden Songbook Soul of Garo (牙狼 黄金歌集 牙狼魂, GARO Kogane Kashū Kibaōkami Tamashī) (with Various Artists)	Released: September 25, 2013; Label: Lantis; Formats: CD, digital download	25	22
JAM Project 15th Anniversary Strong Box Motto! Motto''!!-2015-	Released: September 9, 2015; Label: Lantis; Format: CD	15	12
"—" denotes a release that did not chart
