= Super Robot Wars Original Generation: The Inspector =

Japanese anime television series

- Super Robot Wars OG: The Inspector
- Cover of the first DVD Volume, showing Kyosuke and Excellen alongside the Alteisen and the Weissritter

スーパーロボット大戦OG ジ・インスペクター (Sūpā Robotto Taisen Ōjī Jī Insupektā)
- Genre: Mecha
- Anime television series
- Directed by: Masami Ōbari
- Produced by: Hiroshi Matsumura; Hisanori Kunisaki; Homare Muto; Takanobu Terada; Yoshitaka Goto
- Written by: Yuichiro Takeda; Tatsunosuke Yatsufusa
- Studio: Asahi Production
- Licensed by: NA: Crunchyroll
- Original network: Tokyo MX TV, AT-X, Chiba TV, KBS Kyoto, Sun TV, TV Aichi, TV Kanagawa, TV Saitama
- Original run: October 1, 2010 – April 1, 2011
- Episodes: 26
- Manga

Super Robot Wars Original Generation: The Inspector - Record of ATX
- Written by: Tatsunosuke Yatsufusa
- Published by: ASCII Media Works
- Magazine: Dengeki Hobby Magazine (December 2010 - March 2014); Dengeki Hobby Web (April 2014 - August 2015)
- Original run: December 25, 2010 – August 27, 2015
- Volumes: 7
- Manga

Super Robot Wars Original Generation: The Inspector - Record of ATX - Bad Beat Bunker
- Written by: Tatsunosuke Yatsufusa
- Published by: ASCII Media Works
- Magazine: Dengeki Hobby Web
- Original run: November 4, 2015 – present
- Volumes: 8

Super Robot Wars Original Generation: The Inspector (スーパーロボット大戦OG ジ・インスペクター, Sūpā Robotto Taisen Ōjī Jī Insupektā) is a Japanese anime series, that retells the events from the Super Robot Taisen: Original Generation 2 game, a game featuring only original characters and mechs created by Banpresto for the Super Robot Wars franchise. It was produced by Asahi Production and started broadcasting in several Japanese TV stations on October 1, 2010. The anime also received a simulcast release on the English anime streaming website, Crunchyroll.

== Summary ==
The anime is a sequel to Super Robot Wars Original Generation: Divine Wars, and similarly is not a direct adaptation of the original video game and the PlayStation 2 remake, it includes several changes to the whole plot, with also some new mecha being introduced. A few of these changes include:

- The exclusion of the Huckebein, which was replaced with two new units: The PTX-EX Exbein and the PTX-G Guarbein.
- Sanger's Grungust Type-3 Unit-2 is painted in a black and gold color scheme similar to the Grungust Type-0.
- Inclusion of new units made exclusively for the anime. These units were the Gravilion, Sol Gravilion, PTX-007-02 Gespenst Mark II Type SA, ASK-G03C Rapiecage Fantome, RPT-005 Mass Produced Wildschein and the Einst versions of the Cybuster, SRX, Grungust and Great Kaminarimon (A character previously appearing only in older Banpresto titles). A black version of the Angelg is also included.
- The Vaisaga becoming Lamia's permanent unit after she is recovered from the Shadow Mirror headquarters. In the games, a special requirement is needed to obtain this unit.
- Axel pilots AshSaber instead of SoulGain in his duel against Kyosuke
- Some of the units from Super Robot Taisen: Original Generation and Super Robot Wars Original Generation Gaiden were included like the Seigerlion, Weisssavior, Gespenst Type-RV, Randgrid Raven, Laz Angriff Raven, Compatible Kaiser (cameo only) and the Gespenst MK-II M Cry Wolves Squad Unit.
- Characters from Super Robot Wars Original Generation Gaiden, Super Robot Wars MX and 3rd Super Robot Wars Alpha were included prior to the series' revised epilogue.
- The formal introduction of the Shadow Mirror World's Kyosuke Nanbu, sometimes known as Einst Beowulf.
- A much more thorough explanation about System XN and the Shadow Mirror's secret operation named Operation Endless Frontier.

== Story ==
Half a year has gone by since the end of the L5 Campaign and the war with the alien species known as the Aerogators, meanwhile remnants of the military faction called DC are still at large. The President of the world government reveals the presence of aliens and vows to take measure to ensure Earth is well prepared for another invasion. As the story unfolds many new factions come to the forefront aiming to take leadership, along with new emerging alien threats. Only the teams of the Hagane and Hiryuu Kai can hope to solve this crisis.

== Characters ==
=== Main characters ===
Kyousuke Nanbu (キョウスケ・ナンブ, Kyousuke Nanbu)
Voiced by: Toshiyuki Morikawa
A serious, stoic leader of the ATX Team, who has a habit with gambling.
Excellen Browning (エクセレン・ブロウニング, Ekuseren Burouningu)
Voiced by: Yuuko Mizutani
A fun-loving, somewhat ditzy pilot of the ATX Team and Kyosuke's girlfriend, she makes men uncomfortable with her flirting and jokes.
Brooklyn 'Bullet' Luckfield (ブルックリン・ラックフィールド, Burukkurin Rakkufīrudo)
Voiced by: Tomokazu Sugita
A rookie pilot from the ATX Team, with extensive training and abilities, he insists that others address him as Bullet.
Lamia Loveless (ラミア・ラヴレス, Ramia Ravuresu)
Voiced by: Kaori Shimizu
The newest member of the ATX team, claims to be a test pilot but seems to have a hidden agenda, she pilots the mysterious Angelg.

=== Supporting characters ===
Ryuusei Date (リュウセイ・ダテ, Ryuusei Date)
Voiced by: Shinichiro Miki
A mecha otaku and finalist for the Burning PT Tournament, he is the protagonist of Divine Wars, drafted by the Earth Federation Army for their secret SRX Development Project.
Raidiese F. Branstein (ライディース・F・ブランシュタイン, Raidīsu.F.Buranshutain)
Voiced by: Ryotaro Okiayu
A stalwart test pilot for the Earth Federation Army, he is the next person to be part of the SRX Development Project.
Aya Kobayashi (アヤ・コバヤシ, Aya Kobayashi)
Voiced by: Yumi Touma
A relatively new and inexperienced member of the military, she is the third person to be part of the SRX Development Project.
Latooni Subouta (ラトゥーニ・スゥボータ, Ratūni Suubōta)
Voiced by: Riko Hirai
A quiet young girl who was the part of an experimental project to create Personal Trooper pilots. She begins to open up more after befriending Ryusei and develops a crush on him.
Sanger Zonvolt (ゼンガー・ゾンボルト, Zengā Zonboruto)
Voiced by: Kenichi Ono
The leader of the ATX Team, he fights with the skills and demeanor of an ancient Samurai.
Kusuha Mizuha (クスハ・ミズハ, Kusuha Mizuha)
Voiced by: Mikako Takahashi
A kind-hearted childhood friend of Ryusei, she enlists into the Earth Federation Army as a nurse.
Masaki Andoh (マサキ・アンドー, Masaki Andō)
Voiced by: Hikaru Midorikawa
A rash, young pilot of the mysterious Cybuster, he pursues his nemesis, Shuu Shirakawa, with the help of his familiar cats, Kuro and Shiro, in order to settle old scores.
Shuu Shirakawa (シュウ・シラカワ, Shuu Shirakawa)
Voiced by: Takehito Koyasu
A brilliant scientist, who is familiar with Masaki Andoh. During the events of The Inspector, he helps the teams of the Hagane and Hiryuu Kai to resolve the Einst threat.
Rätsel Feinschmecker (レーツェル・ファインシュメッカー, Rētsueru Fainshumekkā)
Voiced by: Tetsu Inada
Originally known as Elzam V. Branstein, The older brother of Raidiese, he assists the Hagane and Hiryuu Kai during the Einst threat.

Lune Zoldark (リューネ・ゾルダーク, Ryune Zoldark)
Voiced by: Narumi Hikada
Daughter of Bian Zoldark, founder of the Divine Crusaders. Lune's an outspoken tomboy with torn jeans and a high aptitude for mecha piloting. She was a member of the DC, but spent most of the time physically training in Jupiter. About her mecha, she was supposedly given a customized Valsion, but she didn't like how it looked... so Bian modified its look to resemble a giant, walking robot version of herself, the Valsione, complete with hair and an emotion copy system (its face changes according to Lune's current expression).

Yuuki Jaggar (ユウキ・ジェグナン, Yuuki Jegunan)
Voiced by: Mitsuaki Madono
Is a calm, loyal, clear-headed man with a pleasant attitude, akin to that of a gentleman.
He has a strong sense of justice, often disliking to see the weak being bullied or hurt by those with power.

Ricarla "Carla" Borgnine (リルカーラ・ボーグナイン, Rirukāra Bogunain)
Voiced by: Rica Matsumoto
A passionate, 18-year-old girl, Ricarla "Carla" Borgnine is extremely nice and caring to her companions and comrades, usually helping them with their problems, regardless of how minuscule they may be. Carla looks optimistically to the future, though her past is what troubles her the most.

Viletta Vadim (ヴィレッタ・バディム, Viretta Vadimu)
Voiced by: Atsuko Tanaka

A mysterious, straight-faced woman, Viletta Vadim possess exceptional piloting and leadership skills. Similar to Ingram Prisken, Viletta is very analytical of situations during battle and, nonetheless, very calm with people around her.

Arado Balanga (アラド・バランガ, Arado Balanga)
Voiced by: Kazuya Kaichi

Unlike his School training partner, Seolla Schweizer, Arado Balanga is a more cheerful person, although his attitude to his superiors can be unsettling, according to Seolla. Arado can let his ego get the better of him at times, particularly when it involves arguing with Seolla, with the end result being berated at, even getting delivered a swift beating from her. Nevertheless, his relationship with her is utterly strong, reflecting their promise to look out for each other during their days at The School. For a growing, young man, Arado possesses a rather strange appetite—he is known to down three full-course meals in one sitting, shocking most people. Also, he is one of the few people to try Kusuha Mizuha's health drinks and not faint, and the first to claim the concoction, which is shunned by all who've tried it (and by people that haven't tried it), is delicious.

Van Vat Tram (バン・バ・チュン, Ban Ba Chun)
Voiced by: Katsuhisa Houki

He has appeared as an enemy character in the Super Robot Taisen: Original Generation series.

=== Inspectors ===
Wendolo (ウェンドロ, Wendoro)
Voiced by: Yuki Kaida

Mekibos (メキボス, Mekibosu)
Voiced by: Akira Ishida

Vigagi (ヴィガジ, Vigaji)
Voiced by: Takeshi Kusao

Aguija (アギーハ, Agīha)
Voiced by: Yu Asakawa

Sikalog (シカログ, Shikarogu)

=== Neue DC ===
Archibald Grims (アーチボルド・グリムズ, Āchiborudo Gurimuzu)
Voiced by: Takumi Yamazaki

Ouka Nagisa (オウカ・ナギサ, Ouka Nagisa)
Voiced by: Michiko Neya

Cuervo Cero (クエルボ・セロ, Kuerubo Sero)
Voiced by: Koji Yusa

Agilla Setme (アギラ・セトメ, Agira Setome)
Voiced by: Ako Mayama

Sophia Nate (ソフィア・ネート, Sofia Nēto)
Voiced by: Mika Doi

Fehu Egret (イーグレット・フェフ, Īguretto Fefu)
Voiced by: Kenyu Horiuchi

Uruz Egret (イーグレット・ウルズ, Īguretto Uruzu)
Voiced by: Akira Ishida

Thurisaz Egret (イーグレット・スリサズ, Īguretto Surisazu)
Voiced by: Akira Ishida

Ansuz Egret (イーグレット・アンサズ, Īguretto Ansazu)
Voiced by: Akira Ishida

=== Shadow Mirror ===
Vindel Mauser (ヴィンデル・マウザー, Vinderu Mauzā)
Voiced by: Hideyuki Umezu

Lemon Browning (レモン・ブロウニング, Remon Burouningu)
Voiced by: Yuko Mizutani

Axel Almer (アクセル・アルマー, Akuseru Arumā)
Voiced by: Nobutoshi Kanna

Wodan Ymir (ウォーダン・ユミル, Wōdan Yumiru)
Voiced by: Kenichi Ono

Echidna Iisaki (エキドナ・イーサッキ, Ekidona Īsakki)
Voiced by: Mariko Suzuki

=== Einst ===
Einst Regisseur (アインストレジセイア, Ainsuto Rejiseia)
Voiced by: Norio Wakamoto

Einst Alfimi (アインスト・アルフィミィ, Ainsuto Arufimī)
Voiced by: Yuko Mizutani

Beowulf (ベーオウルフ, Bēourufu)
Voiced by: Toshiyuki Morikawa

== Media ==
=== Anime ===
The anime was produced by Asahi Production and Sotsu Agency with Masami Ōbari as the director. The show first aired on October 1, 2010 on several TV stations in Japan. The anime has 26 episodes. The animation style of the series is also different from the first series as well, incorporating hand-drawn animation instead of 3D CGI.

Four pieces of theme music are used within the show, two opening songs and two ending songs. The first opening theme is MAXON and the second opening is Ryuusei Lovers by JAM Project while the first ending song is Bokura no Jiyuu and the second ending song is Saigo no Tabi by Aki Misato.

=== Manga ===
A manga adaptation of the anime titled Super Robot Wars Original Generation: The Inspector - Record of ATX (スーパーロボット大戦OG -ジ・インスペクター- Record of ATX, Sūpā Robotto Taisen Ōjī Jī Insupektā - Record of ATX) began serialization in Dengeki Hobby Magazine in February 2011 issue released on December 25, 2010.

== Production ==
- Director: Masami Ōbari
- Series Composition & Screenplay: Yuichiro Takeda, Tatsunosuke Yatsufusa
- Supervision: Takanobu Terada, Soichiro Morizumi
- Chief Animation Director: Yosuke Kabashima
- Mechanical Animation Director: Masahiro Yamane
- Action Director: Fujio Suzuki
- Mechanical Design: Kazutaka Miyatake, Hajime Katoki, Mika Akitaka, Kazue Saito, Masahiro Yamane, Tsukasa Kotobuki, Masami Ōbari
- Original Character Design : Sachiko Kouno, Kazue Saito
- Anime Character Design: Risa Ebata, Kenichi Hamasaki, Yukihito Ogomori, Masahiro Yamane
- Production Design: Koji Nakakita
- Animation Production: Asahi Production
- Original Story: SR Produce Team
- Production: Sotsu, SRWOG PROJECT
