= Super Robot Wars OG 2 =

2005 video game

Super Robot Taisen: Original Generation 2
- Developer: Banpresoft
- Publishers: JP: Banpresto; NA: Atlus; EU: 505 Games
- Platform: Game Boy Advance
- Release: JP: February 3, 2005; NA: November 21, 2006; PAL: May 1, 2007
- Genre: Tactical role-playing
- Mode: Single Player

Super Robot Taisen: Original Generation 2 (スーパーロボット大戦ORIGINAL GENERATION2, Sūpā Robotto Taisen Orijinaru Jenerēshon Tsū) is a tactical role-playing game for the Game Boy Advance. It is the second Super Robot Taisen game that was officially released in North America.

The story selection system of Super Robot Taisen: Original Generation did not return. Instead, Original Generation 2 has a branching storyline during intervals of the game. Original Generation 2 primarily focuses on two protagonists from the first game, one of which is selected by the player at the start: Kyosuke Nanbu and Excellen Browning. In addition, a total of four new series (three of them past Super Robot Wars games, while one is a manga) appear, adding new characters, mechs, major events from the respective stories of the series and some original creations for this game itself. The user interface was also redesigned.

On June 27, 2007, Super Robot Wars: Original Generations, an enhanced remake of both Original Generation games, was released in Japan for the PlayStation 2. Later works such as Super Robot Wars 30 have generally referred to the game as Super Robot Wars OG 2 in retrospect.

== Storyline ==
It has been six months since the end of the Divine Crusaders War and the L5 Campaign. Seeing a greater need to defend the Earth from future extraterrestrial invaders, the Earth Federation Army begins to mass-produce its line of Personal Troopers, as well as introducing new mechs to combat alien threats to humanity, after the Tokyo Manifest announcement. However, remnants of the Divine Crusaders are still at large, and continue to oppose the Federation. Meanwhile, behind the shadows, mysterious beings are at work, eagerly awaiting their chance to strike and subjugate humanity, or perhaps destroy it, as even greater forces, more powerful and menacing than the Aerogaters, begin to appear.

== Series included in Super Robot Taisen: Original Generation 2 ==
- Banpresto Originals (Not a TV or movie series)
  - Shin Super Robot Wars
  - Super Robot Wars Gaiden: Masō Kishin – The Lord Of Elemental
  - Chokijin RyuKoOh Denki (超機人 龍虎王伝奇) (New)
  - 3rd Super Robot Wars (New)
  - Super Robot Wars F
  - Super Robot Wars F Final
  - Super Robot Wars Alpha
  - Super Robot Wars Alpha Gaiden
  - 2nd Super Robot Wars Alpha (New)
  - Super Robot Wars Compact 2
  - Super Robot Wars Impact
  - Super Hero Operations
  - Hero Senki: Project Olympus
  - Super Robot Wars A (New)

== Reception ==
Reception

Review scores
Publication	Score
GameSpot	8.4/10
Hardcore Gamer	4.5/5
Nintendo Power	7.0/10
RPGFan	90%

Steve Thomason in Nintendo Power praised the game's improved battle animations over its predecessor, Super Robot Taisen: Original Generation, but criticized the long dialog sequences between missions.
