= Yūko Mizutani =

Japanese actress (1964–2016)

- 水谷優子
- Born: November 4, 1964; Ama District, Aichi, Japan
- Died: May 17, 2016 (aged 51); Tokyo, Japan
- Occupations: Actress; voice actress; narrator; singer
- Years active: 1985–2016
- Agent: Aoni Production
- Spouse: Mizuho Nishikubo (m. 1994)

Yūko Mizutani (水谷 優子, Mizutani Yūko; November 4, 1964 – May 17, 2016) was a Japanese actress, voice actress, narrator and singer from Ama District, Aichi. Throughout her career, she worked with Production Baobab, and was working with Aoni Production at the time of her death. Mizutani was best known for her anime voice roles of Sakiko Sakura in Chibi Maruko-chan, Mihoshi Kuramitsu in Tenchi Muyo! and Pinoko in Black Jack. She also portrayed Excellen Browning in Super Robot Wars, Sora Takenouchi in Digimon Adventure, Leina Stol in Machine Robo: Revenge of Cronos, and Sarah Zabiarov and Cheimin Noa in Mobile Suit Zeta Gundam. Mizutani was the official Japanese voice actress for Minnie Mouse, and voiced her in the Kingdom Hearts franchise.

Since her death, Aya Endō took over as the Japanese voice of Minnie Mouse and Machiko Toyoshima took over as Sakiko Sakura in Chibi Maruko-chan.

== Career ==
After graduating from the Institute for Youth Theater in 1985, Mizutani was signed to the Seinenza Theater Company's talent agency until 1989. She debuted in 1985 as an airfield announcer for Mobile Suit Zeta Gundam while appearing on television in TV dramas. After playing the role of Sarah Zabiarov in Mobile Suit Zeta Gundam, her portrayals of Leina Stol in Machine Robo: Revenge of Cronos and Apple in Zillion were highly praised and her popularity grew. In 1988, she starred as Hiromi Oka in Aim for the Ace! 2.

Since 1991, Mizutani had been the official voice of Disney's Minnie Mouse. In addition to animation and video games at the Tokyo Disney Resort, she also appeared as Minnie Mouse in attractions, shows, and parades.

She voiced the role of Sakiko Sakura in the anime series Chibi Maruko-chan from 1990 until her death.

In 1993 she voiced Pinoko, Black Jack's loyal assistant/adopted daughter, in Osamu Tezuka's Black Jack OVA. She reprised the role in an anime series from 2004 to 2011.

Mizutani was cast from 1995 to 1997 as Galaxy Police detective Mihoshi Kuramitsu in Tenchi Muyo!.

== Personal life ==
In November 1994, she married Mizuho Nishikubo.

== Death ==
On May 17, 2016, Mizutani died from breast cancer at the age of 51.

== Filmography ==
=== Anime television ===
- Mobile Suit Zeta Gundam (1985–1986) – Sarah Zabiarov and Cheimin Noa
- Dirty Pair (1985) – Security Guard, Creamy Girl
- Machine Robo: Revenge of Cronos (1986–1987) – Leina Stōl
- Mobile Suit Gundam ZZ (1986–1987) – Milly Childer
- Zillion (1987–1987) – Apple
- City Hunter (1987–1988) – Yoshimi Iwai
- Esper Mami (1987–1989) – Midori
- Tenkū Senki Shurato (1989–1990) – Lakshu of Kisshō Ten, Hōraisan
- Idol Densetsu Eriko (1989–1990) – Kaori Yamaguchi, Catherine, Reporter
- Idol Angel Yokoso Yoko (1990) – Kyoko Hoshihana
- Oishinbo (1990) – Kimiko Oide
- Yawara! (1990–1992) – Anna Teleshikova
- Nadia: The Secret of Blue Water (1990–1991) – Marie
- Kyatto Ninden Teyandee (1990–1991) – Omitsu
- Brave Exkaiser (1990) – Kumiko Morita
- Momotaro Densetsu (1990–1991) – Princess Kaguya (Second)
- Chibi Maruko-chan (1990–2016) – Sakiko Sakura, Keiko Uchida, Wakabayashi, Nagasawa's Mother, Yamane's Mother, Hiroshi Sakura (young)
- Jankenman (1991) – Aikko
- Ashita e Free Kick (1992) – Alyssa Montino
- Boyfriend (1992) – Aki Togawa
- Floral Magician Mary Bell (1992) – Paula
- Tekkaman Blade (1992) – Miyuki Aiba/Tekkaman Rapier, Noal's mother
- Tonde Burin (1994–1995) – Rikako Kokubu
- Mobile Fighter G Gundam (1994–1995) – Black Joker
- Tico of the Seven Seas (1994–1995) – Cheryl Christina Melville
- Chō Kuse ni Narisō (1994–1995) – Sayaka Seijo
- Haō Taikei Ryū Knight (1994–1995) – Iori
- Dino Adventure Jurassic Tripper (1995) – Princess
- Tenchi Universe (1995) – Mihoshi Kuramitsu
- Sorcerer Hunters (1995–1996) – Chocolate Misu
- Soar High! Isami (1995–1996) – Jasmine
- Shadow Skill (1995–2004) – Fouly
- Kiko-chan's Smile (1996) – Megumi-Sensei
- Magical Girl Pretty Sammy (1996) – Mihoshi Mizutani
- After War Gundam X (1996) – Carris Nautilus
- Martian Successor Nadesico (1996–1997) – Aqua Crimson
- Brave Command Dagwon (1996–1997) – Erika Serizawa
- Saber Marionette J (1996–1997) – Luchs
- Tenchi in Tokyo (1997) – Mihoshi Kuramitsu
- Gakkyu-Oh Yamazaki (1997–1998) – Memeko-Sensei, Nakamoto
- Weiss Kreuz (1998) – Tot
- The Kindaichi Case Files (1998) – Satsuki Munakata
- Saber Marionette J to X (1998–1999) – Luchs
- Digimon Adventure (1999–2000) – Sora Takenouchi
- Excel Saga (1999–2000) – The Great Will of the Macrocosm
- Inuyasha (2000) – Sōten
- Detective Conan (2000) – Shinobu Shimon
- Digimon Adventure 02 (2000–2001) – Sora Takenouchi
- Go! Go! Itsutsugo Land (2001–2002) – Kinoko Morino
- The Family's Defensive Alliance (2001) – Junko Ejima
- Kirby: Right Back at Ya! (2001–2003) – Memu (Lady Like), Waddle Doo (Third), Mabel, Coo, Chilly, Walky, and Devil Frog
- Someday's Dreamers (2003) – Sachiko
- Cinderella Boy (2003) – Kei
- Zatch Bell! (2003–2006) – Sisters
- Yu-Gi-Oh! Duel Monsters GX (2004–2008) – Sara
- Black Jack (2004–2006) – Pinoko
- The Snow Queen (2005) – Claus
- Kashimashi: Girl Meets Girl (2006) – Namiko Tsuki
- Super Robot Wars Original Generation: Divine Wars (2006–2007) – Excellen Browning
- Shiki (2010) – Kyōko Ozaki, Atsuko Yasumori
- Notari Matsutarō (2014) – Reiko Minami
- Ai Tenchi Muyo! (2014) – Mihoshi
- Pretty Guardian Sailor Moon Crystal (2014–2016) – Ikuko Tsukino
- The Rolling Girls (2015) – Aya Suzumoto

=== OVA ===
- Bubblegum Crisis (1987–1991 OVA series) – Anri
- Space Family Carlvinson (1988) – Beruka
- Leina series (1988) – Leina Stōl
- Aim for the Ace! (1988–1989 OVA series) – Hiromi Oka
- Bio-Booster Armor Guyver (1989–1992 OVA series) – Mizuki Segawa
- Angel Cop (1989–1994) – Freya
- Blood Reign: Curse of the Yoma (1989) – Kotone
- 3×3 Eyes (1991) – Natsuko Asai
- Eternal Filena (1992) – Lila
- Tenchi Muyo! Ryo-Ohki (1992) – Mihoshi Kuramitsu
- Black Jack (1993–2011) – Pinoko
- KO Beast (1992) – V-Sion
- Idol Defense Force Hummingbird (1993–1995) – Hitomi Nakajo
- Magical Girl Pretty Sammy (1995) – Mihoshi Mizutani
- Eternal Family (1997) – Akiko
- Hyper Speed GranDoll (1997) – Miki Amagi
- Super Robot Wars Original Generation: The Animation (2005) – Excellen Browning
- Eve no jikan (2008–2009 ONA) – Naoko
- A Channel (2012) – Run's Mother
- Ranma ½ OVA's – Kurumi

=== Video games ===
- Flash Hiders (1993) – Harman Do Elan
- Puyo Puyo CD (1994) – Draco Centauros, Sukiyapodes
- Battle Tycoon: Flash Hiders SFX (1995) – Harman Do Elan
- Dōkyūsei (1995) – Hiromi Tamachi
- Puyo Puyo CD 2 (1996) – Draco Centauros
- Langrisser III (1996) – Sophia
- Kid Klown no Crazy Chase 2: Love Love Honey Soudatsusen (1996) – Princess Honey
- Silhouette Mirage (1997) – Sophial SP
- Bulk Slash (1997) – Colon Steiner
- Rockman X4 (1997) – Iris
- YAKATA (1998) – Miruko Kawaguchi
- Magical Drop F (1999) – Justice & High Priestess
- Growlanser (1999) – Karene Langley
- Puyo Puyo~n (1999) – Witch
- Super Robot Wars Impact (2002) – Excellen Browning & Alfimi
- Kingdom Hearts series (2002-2016) – Minnie Mouse
- Growlanser II: The Sense of Justice (2004) – Karene Langley
- Namco × Capcom (2005) – Toby Masuyo, Katana & 99
- Super Robot Wars Original Generations (2007) – Excellen & Lemon Browning; and Alfimi
- Super Robot Wars Original Generation Gaiden (2007) – Excellen Browning & Alfimi
- Super Robot Wars OG Saga: Endless Frontier EXCEED (2008) – Alfimi, Katana & Byakuya
- Project X Zone (2012) – Iris, Katana, Akatana & Byakuya X
- Project X Zone 2 (2015) – Katana, Akatana & Byakuya X

=== Films ===
- My Neighbor Totoro (1988) – Ryoko-chan
- Doraemon: The Record of Nobita's Parallel Visit to the West (1988) (Linlei)
- Eiji (1990) – Marina Takasugi
- Crayon Shin-chan: Unkokusai's Ambition (1995) – Yukino
- Tenchi Muyo in Love! (1996) – Mihoshi Kuramitsu
- Dead Leaves (2004) – Galactica
- Doraemon: Nobita in the Wan-Nyan Spacetime Odyssey (2004) (Zubu)
- Dōbutsu no Mori (2006) – Perimi/Phyllis
- Detective Conan: Full Score of Fear (2008) – Rara Chigusa
- Time of Eve: The Movie (2010) – Naoko Sakisaka

=== Dubbing ===
==== Live-action ====
- Sarah Michelle Gellar roles
  - Buffy the Vampire Slayer – Buffy Summers
  - Possession – Jess
  - The Grudge – Karen Davis
  - The Grudge 2 – Karen Davis
  - Southland Tales – Krysta Now
- Meg Ryan roles
  - Sleepless in Seattle – Annie Reed
  - You've Got Mail – Kathleen "Shopgirl" Kelly
- 8 Million Ways to Die – Sunny (Alexandra Paul)
- Army of Darkness – Sheila (Embeth Davidtz)
- Bad Santa – Sue (Lauren Graham)
- Beverly Hills, 90210 – Andrea Zuckerman (Gabrielle Carteris)
- Beyond the Poseidon Adventure – Theresa Mazzetti (Angela Cartwright)
- Bound – Violet (Jennifer Tilly)
- The Arrival – Char (Teri Polo)
- Career Opportunities – Josie McClellan (Jennifer Connelly)
- Casualties of War – Tran Thi Oanh (Thuy Thu Le)
- Cliffhanger – Sarah (Michelle Joyner)
- Color of Night – Sondra Dorio (Lesley Ann Warren)
- The Distinguished Gentleman – Celia Kirby (Victoria Rowell)
- Doc Hollywood – Vialula "Lou" (Julie Warner)
- Dr. Jekyll and Ms. Hyde – Sarah Carver (Lysette Anthony)
- Emily Brontë's Wuthering Heights – Isabella Linton (Sophie Ward)
- Escape from L.A. – Taslima (Valeria Golino)
- Everyone Says I Love You – Skylar Dandridge (Drew Barrymore)
- Friday the 13th Part VIII: Jason Takes Manhattan – Rennie Wickham (Jensen Daggett)
- The Golden Child (1992 TV Asahi edition) – Kee Nang (Charlotte Lewis)
- Highlander III: The Sorcerer – Dr. Alexandra Johnson/Sarah Barrington (Deborah Kara Unger)
- Hollow Man – Sarah Kennedy (Kim Dickens)
- Home Alone – Heather McCallister (Kristin Minter)
- Home Alone 2: Lost in New York – Tracy McCallister (Senta Moses)
- Iron Eagle – Amy (Kathy Wagner)
- Jumanji – Judy Shepherd (Kirsten Dunst)
- King Kong – Dwan (Jessica Lange)
- Kiss of Death – Rosie Kilmartin (Kathryn Erbe)
- Knock Off – Karen Lee (Lela Rochon)
- Last Action Hero – Whitney Slater/Meredith Caprice (Bridgette Wilson)
- The Last Boy Scout – Cory (Halle Berry)
- A Nightmare on Elm Street – Tina Gray (Amanda Wyss)
- NYPD Blue – Robin Wirkus (Debrah Farentino)
- Pale Rider – Megan Wheeler (Sydney Penny)
- The Pink Panther – Princess Dala (Gale Garnett)
- Poison Ivy: The New Seduction – Violet (Jaime Pressly)
- Practical Magic – Kylie Owens (Evan Rachel Wood)
- Return of the Living Dead Part II – Lucy Wilson (Marsha Dietlein)
- Romy and Michele's High School Reunion – Christie Masters (Julia Campbell)
- Scooby-Doo 2: Monsters Unleashed – Heather Jasper-Howe (Alicia Silverstone)
- She-Wolf of London – Randi Wallace (Kate Hodge)
- Short Circuit 2 – Sandy Banatoni (Cynthia Gibb)
- Sibling Rivalry – Jeanine (Jami Gertz)
- Single White Female – Hedra "Hedy" Carlson/Ellen Besch (Jennifer Jason Leigh)
- Sleepers – Carol (Minnie Driver)
- Stargate SG-1 – Hathor (Suanne Braun)
- Three Men and a Baby – Sally (Barbara Budd)
- True Lies – Dana Tasker (Eliza Dushku)
- Vampire in Brooklyn – Det. Rita Veder (Angela Bassett)
- Waitress – Dawn (Adrienne Shelly)
- Will & Grace – Ellen (Leigh-Allyn Baker)

==== Animation ====
- Balto – Rosy
- House of Mouse – Minnie Mouse
- Hercules – Terpsichore
- The Mask: Animated Series – Peggy Brandt
- Mickey, Donald, Goofy: The Three Musketeers – Minnie Mouse
- Peanuts – Pig-Pen, Violet Gray
- Tiny Toon Adventures – Sweetie Pie

=== Drama CDs ===
- Analyst no Yuutsu series 1: Benchmark ni Koi wo Shite – Chizuru Mizusawa
