= Super Robot Wars: Original Generations =

2007 video game

Super Robot Wars OG
- Korean box art
- Developer(s): Banpresoft
- Publisher(s): Banpresto
- Composer(s): Michiaki Watanabe; Koji Hayama; Naofumi Tsuruyama; Takuya Hanaoka; Takahiro Kamikawa; Yasufumi Fukuda; JAM Project
- Platform(s): PlayStation 2
- Release: JP: June 28, 2007
- Genre(s): Tactical role-playing
- Mode(s): Single player

Super Robot Wars OG (スーパーロボット大戦OG オリジナルジェネレーションズ, Sūpā Robotto Taisen Ōjī Orijinaru Jenerēshonzu) is a 2007 tactical role-playing game for the PlayStation 2. OG is a remake of the two Original Generation games for the Game Boy Advance and is intended to celebrate the Super Robot Wars series' 15th anniversary. It was released on June 28, 2007.

== Gameplay ==
OG is developed by the team that produced Super Robot Wars MX and uses high-energy, dynamic action for the in-game battle sequences. There are similarities in the user interface and battle screen to the 3rd Super Robot Wars Alpha: To the End of the Galaxy, though it is merely coincidence, as the producing team may have been influenced by the design of Alpha 3.

The game includes a new variation of the squad combat system of the 2nd Super Robot Wars Alpha and Alpha 3, called the Twin Battle System. It allows two adjacent units to combine into one squad, which can then attack simultaneously. The units can either focus their fire on a single target (with a damage penalty for the secondary unit) or, when facing another squad, each target a different one of its members. Squads can also support other squads offensively and/or defensively, allowing up to four attacks in a single action. As in the Alpha games, a single unit can also use an ALL attack to strike both members of an enemy squad at once. The game also features new ALLW Attacks, similar to the Double Attacks in MX, which can strike both members of a target squad and a single unit (or squad) directly next to it.

A small, but significant change in gameplay are the Spirit Commands, character abilities akin to magic spells. All characters retain their set of six Spirit Commands when fighting alone, but when placed into a squad, a seventh Spirit Command is available, known as the Twin Command. This Twin Command, unique to each character, takes SP (Spirit Points) from both characters in the squad, and is generally more powerful than the other Spirit Commands available to them. This makes Original Generations the first game in the franchise to break the six Spirit Command limit.

=== Changes and additions ===
Original Generations is primarily a remake of the two previous Original Generation games, replacing them in the official Original Generation continuity, thereby retconning the Game Boy Advance stories. Parts of the plot in the first Original Generation segment of Original Generations is derived from the animated Super Robot Wars Original Generation: Divine Wars, so as to follow continuity. The game also includes a fair amount of new content.

- New mechs and characters from new series for the game include the following:
  - Compatible Kaiser, the giant robot from Banpresto's Super Nintendo Entertainment System game, The Great Battle IV (redesigned for the game by Masami Ōbari), as well as its pilot, Fighter Roar.
    - Roar's appearance in Original Generations is believed to be a direct continuation of the plot of The Great Battle IV, with Warrior Roar and the Compatible Kaiser being thrown into the universe of Original Generation. Roar manifests itself inside a human, Kouta Azuma, who transforms into Fighter Roar, using the Roar Armor. Roar, the Compatible Kaiser and Kouta make their playable appearance in the bonus segment.
  - Raul Gureden, the male protagonist of Super Robot Wars R for the Game Boy Advance.
    - Raul appears along with his friends, Raji Montoya and Mizuho Saiki, and pilots the EXF-02 Excellence. Only the Striker, Cosmodriver, and Flyer frames appear in the game. In Original Generation continuity, Fiona Gureden, Raul's female counterpart (also the other playable, selectable protagonist) in Reversal, is actually his (slightly) younger twin sister, and test pilot for the second Excellence unit. The Excellence units and both Raul and Fiona are playable in the Original Generation 2 part of the game. Despinoiz, Lalia and Tiz, the three homunculi of Duminuss, the main antagonist of Reversal, make an appearance in the bonus segment.
  - The bonus segment features the original characters from Super Robot Wars Compact 3.
    - The roster includes Shura King Alkaid Nassh, Shura Advisor Mizal Touval, Freedom Warrior Alion Lucada, Fernando Arduke and his Valefor and Compact 3 protagonist, Folka Albark with his Ialdabaoth. They are the antagonists against Fighter Roar, where Folka is seen working alongside the Shura, making his appearance more-or-less a prequel to the Compact 3 storyline.
- Additional mecha designed specifically for the game include the following:
  - ART-1 (Advanced Real Personal Trooper Test Type-1; designed by Hajime Katoki)
    - It is an advanced test unit of the Real Personal Trooper Type-1, with the ability to transform into a flight mode, dubbed ART-Wing, piloted by Ryusei Date. Playable only in the bonus segment.
    - The ART-1, accompanied with Alt Eisen Reise and Cybaster, participated in Another Century's Episode: R under the title "Super Robot Wars OG" (since the game featured its series' own original called A.C.E. Originals).
  - XRAM-004FA Armorlion
    - A customized version of the DCAM-04 Lion, designed by Ryoto Hikawa, it is a full-armor model, featuring additional parts inspired by the Gespenst, Huckebein, and Alt Eisen. Playable in all areas of the game.
  - PTX-001RV Gespenst Type-RV
    - The personal unit of Guiliam Jeager, it is modified from the PTX-001R Gespenst Type-R and features additional technology and weapons. Playable in Original Generation 2 and the bonus segment.
  - VTX-000 Mironga & VTX-001 Bartoll
    - The Mironga is the prototype of the Bartoll, the enemy mecha from the Super Robot Wars Original Generation: The Animation OVA. Both units appear in the bonus segment, an adaptation of the OVA's plot. The Mironga's first appearance is in Super Robot Wars Original Generation: The Sound Cinema. Kyle Bean, the pilot of the Mironga in the Sound Cinema, appears as an enemy pilot. The Mironga is available as a secret, playable unit only in the bonus segment.
  - XRAM-006VC Siegerlion
    - A heavily modified version of the DCAM-06C Guarlion Custom owned by Leona Garstein, it features additional technology, customized by Tasuku Shinguji. Playable in Original Generation 2 and the bonus segment.
  - YAM-007-1 Astelion AX
    - The upgrade to the prototype YAM-007 Astelion, piloted by Ibis Douglas, it is modified so Tsugumi Takakura can accompany Ibis as a co-pilot, as well as utilizing new attack maneuvers the Astelion could not use before. Playable only in the bonus segment.
  - GS-01 Giganspada
    - A variant of the original Giganscudo, built as an assault machine, with an array of four energy cannons and high durability, it appears as an enemy unit in Original Generation 2 and the bonus segment.
- Several existing units gain new variations, such as twin-barreled Barrelion piloted by Tenzan Nakajima, or new attacks, such as the "Drill Inferno" and "Zankantō Hoshinagi no Tachi" performed by the Thrudgelmir, piloted by Wodan Ymir.
- The game also introduces several new characters, both playable and non-playable, and assigns old ones to new roles:
  - Master Rishu Togo, the sword instructor of Sanger Zonvolt and Brooklyn Luckfield, is playable only in the bonus segment, piloting Sanger's Grungust Type-0.
  - Shoko Azuma, Kouta Azuma's sister. The name Shoko can also be read in Japanese as Emi, the name of Warrior Roar's sister. Shoko appears as a non-playable character in the bonus segment and does not appear in battle.
  - Professor Kisaburo Azuma, Kouta and Shoko's grandfather, who first appears in The Great Battle IV and assists Warrior Roar in his missions. He appears as a non-playable character in the bonus segment and will not participate in battles.
- The Original Generation 2 portion of the game is expanded further, with five extra scenarios before the first missions of Original Generation 2:
  - The first two scenarios revolve around the Reversal protagonists.
  - The third scenario gives the player the chance to use Axel Almer and his Soulgain, a selectable protagonist in Super Robot Wars A.
  - The last two scenarios feature events based on the Super Robot Wars Dengeki Comics, with new enemy characters and units.

== Series included in Super Robot Wars: Original Generations ==
- Banpresto Originals (Not a TV or movie series)
  - Shin Super Robot Wars
  - Super Robot Wars Gaiden: Masō Kishin - The Lord of Elemental
  - Chokijin RyuKoOh Denki (超機人 龍虎王伝奇)
  - 3rd Super Robot Wars
  - Super Robot Wars F
  - Super Robot Wars F Final
  - Super Robot Wars Alpha
  - Super Robot Wars Alpha Gaiden
  - 2nd Super Robot Wars Alpha
  - Super Robot Wars Compact 2
  - Super Robot Wars Impact
  - Super Hero Operations
  - Hero Senki: Project Olympus
  - Super Robot Wars A
  - The Great Battle IV (New)
  - Super Robot Wars R (New)
  - Super Robot Wars Compact 3 (New)
  - Super Robot Wars Original Generation: The Animation (New)
  - Super Robot Wars Original Generation: The Sound Cinema (New)
  - Super Robot Wars Original Generation Chronicle (Stories first published in the Super Robot Wars Dengeki Comics) (New)
  - 3rd Super Robot Wars Alpha: To the End of the Galaxy (New)

== Media ==
The game's soundtrack was released in Japan by Lantis on September 5, 2007, with a retail price of 3,619 Yen.
