= Super Robot Wars =

Video game series

- Genre: Tactical role-playing
- Developers: Winkysoft; Banpresoft; Bandai Namco Forge Digitals
- Publishers: Banpresto (1991–2017); Bandai Namco Entertainment (2019–present)
- Platform: Platforms: Game Boy, Family Computer, Super Famicom, Nintendo 64, Sega Saturn, PlayStation, Game Boy Color, WonderSwan, J2ME, PlayStation 2, GameCube, Dreamcast, Nintendo DS, PlayStation Portable, Wii, Xbox 360, PlayStation 3, Windows, Mobile phone, iOS, Android, PlayStation Vita, PlayStation 4, Nintendo Switch
- First release: Super Robot Wars; April 20, 1991
- Latest release: Super Robot Wars Y August 23, 2025

Super Robot Wars (Note: Japanese: スーパーロボット大戦, Hepburn: Sūpā Robotto Taisen; Frequently abbreviated as SRW or スパロボ (Suparobo)) is a series of Japanese tactical role-playing video games produced by Bandai Namco Entertainment, formerly Banpresto. Starting out as a spinoff of the Compati Hero series, the main feature of the franchise is having a story that crosses over several popular mecha anime, manga and video games, allowing characters and mecha from different titles to team up or battle one another. The first game in the franchise was released for the Game Boy on April 20, 1991, and later spawned numerous games that were released on various consoles and handhelds. Due to the nature of crossover games and licensing involved, only a few games have been released outside Japan, and in English; Super Robot Taisen: Original Generation and its sequel were the first of these in 2006. The franchise celebrated its 25th anniversary in 2016, and its 30th anniversary in 2021, and Super Robot Wars 30 was also released overseas.

== Games ==
Release timeline Main series in bold
1991	**Super Robot Wars**
1991	**2nd Super Robot Wars**
1992
1993	**3rd Super Robot Wars**
1994	**Super Robot Wars EX**
1995	**4th Super Robot Wars**
1996	**Super Robot Wars Gaiden: Masō Kishin – The Lord of Elemental**
1996	**Neo Super Robot Wars**
1997	**Super Robot Wars F**
1998	**Super Robot Wars F Final**
1998	Super Robot Spirits
1999	**Super Robot Wars Compact**
1999	Super Robot Wars – Link Battler
1999	**Super Robot Wars 64**
2000	**Super Robot Wars Compact 2**
2000	**Super Robot Wars Alpha**
2001	**Super Robot Wars Alpha Gaiden**
2001	**Super Robot Wars A**
2002	**Super Robot Wars Impact**
2002	**Super Robot Wars R**
2002	**Super Robot Taisen: Original Generation**
2003	**2nd Super Robot Wars Alpha**
2003	**Super Robot Wars Compact 3**
2003	**Super Robot Wars D**
2003	Super Robot Wars Scramble Commander
2004	**Super Robot Wars MX**
2004	**Super Robot Wars GC**
2005	**Super Robot Taisen: Original Generation 2**
2005	**3rd Super Robot Wars Alpha: To the End of the Galaxy**
2005	**Super Robot Wars J**
2006
2007	**Super Robot Wars W**
2007	**Super Robot Wars: Original Generations**
2007	Super Robot Wars Scramble Commander the 2nd
2007	**Super Robot Wars Original Generation Gaiden**
2008	Super Robot Taisen OG Saga: Endless Frontier
2008	**Super Robot Wars Z**
2009	**Super Robot Wars Z: Special Disk**
2009	**Super Robot Wars K**
2009	SuperRobo Gakuen
2009	**Super Robot Wars NEO**
2010	Super Robot Taisen OG Saga: Endless Frontier Exceed
2010	**Super Robot Wars L**
2011	**2nd Super Robot Wars Z**
2012	**Super Robot Wars OG Saga: Masō Kishin II – Revelation of Evil God**
2012	Super Robot Wars Card Chronicle
2012	**2nd Super Robot Wars Original Generation**
2013	**Super Robot Wars UX**
2013	**Super Robot Wars Operation Extend**
2013	**Super Robot Wars OG Saga: Masō Kishin III – Pride of Justice**
2013	Super Robot Wars OG Infinite Battle
2014	**3rd Super Robot Wars Z**
2014	**Super Robot Wars OG Saga: Masō Kishin F – Coffin of the End**
2015	**Super Robot Wars BX**
2015	Super Robot Wars X-Ω
2016	**Super Robot Wars OG: The Moon Dwellers**
2017	**Super Robot Wars V**
2018	**Super Robot Wars X**
2019	**Super Robot Wars T**
2019	Super Robot Wars DD
2020
2021	**Super Robot Wars 30**
2022
2023
2024
2025	**Super Robot Wars Y**

Most are standalone games, whose background stories may involve the plots of the included series, but no other Super Robot Wars titles. However, there are several main continuities existing with a large Multiverse:

Classic
Consists of the 2nd, the 3rd, EX, F and F Final games (in that order). F and F Final replaced the 4th, while 2G is not considered canon, due to its non-inclusion in the Complete Box set. The side-story Masō Kishin - The Lord Of Elemental is divided into two parts: "Part One" occurs before the 2nd and "Part Two" after the 4th (4th was released before F and F Final). The primary antagonist organization of this series is known as DC (Divine Crusaders).
Masou Kishin
Consists of Gaiden: Masou Kishin - The Lord of Elemental, OG Saga: Masou Kishin 2 - Revelation of Evil God, OG Saga: Masou Kishin 3 - Pride of Justice and OG Saga: Masou Kishin F – Coffin of the End (in that order). Gaiden: Masou Kishin - The Lord of Elemental for the SFC was ported as a remake for the NDS (with a series first use of the OG Saga prefix replacing Gaiden) and later as a remake of that DS version in a limited edition bundle with part 2 of this series, named OG Saga: Masou Kishin I & II, for the PSP. The last two titles in this series were released for the PS3 (the former also was ported to the PS Vita).
Alpha
Consists of Alpha, Alpha Gaiden, Alpha 2 and Alpha 3 games (in that order). "Part One" of Masō Kishin - The Lord Of Elemental also provides relevant information, taking place before Alpha.
Compact
Consists of Compact, Compact 2 and Compact 3 games for the Wonderswan (in that order). The first series game on WS Compact was remade as Compact for WonderSwan Color for the Wonderswan Color. Compact 2 was released as three chapters for the WonderSwan; the trilogy was later compiled with updated visuals, sound and new content as Impact for the PS2.
Impact
Consists of Impact and MX games for the PS2. Previously, Compact 2 was released as three chapters for the WonderSwan; the trilogy was later compiled with updated visuals, sound and new content as Impact for the PS2. Despite the sharing of gameplay mechanics between all of the Wonderswan games, and the similarities between Impact and MX, Compact 2 and Impact are not tied to any other games in the series. MX for the PS2 is seen as a direct sequel to Impact as it reuses several of the same series of the latter and has similar gameplay elements and much of its soundtrack remixed from the one in Impact. MX was ported to the PSP with minor adjustments and additions.
Original Generation
This series does not feature any manga or anime characters at all, instead starring the "Banpresto Originals", original characters made specifically for previous games in the series. This timeline draws upon from all previous continuities. Both Original Generation games for the GBA which were released in the US were compiled with updated visuals and sound as Super Robot Wars Original Generations, followed by the sequel Super Robot Wars Original Generation Gaiden, the remake version of Masō Kishin - The Lord Of Elemental, Masō Kishin 2: Revelation of Evil God, 2nd Super Robot Wars Original Generation, Masō Kishin 3: Pride of Justice, Masō Kishin F: Coffin of The End and Super Robot Wars Original Generation: The Moon Dwellers. Also part of the Original Generation series is the Endless Frontier series, composing of Endless Frontier and Endless Frontier Exceed, which is set after Original Generation Gaiden. This continuity was the only one to have had titles officially released in the West. The Moon Dwellers is one of the first in the series that has an English translation for the Japanese market.
Z
This continuity consists of Z, Z Special Disk, Z2, and Z3 in that order. The story focuses on the Twelve Spheres, which play an important part in the game's story line. This timeline is well-known for introducing an extremely large amount of debuting series, on a scale that previous SRW titles have never reached. In addition, Z3 was the first SRW game to have HD sprites.
International Era
Consists of V, X, T, 30, and Y. This continuity is commonly named this due to SRW V being the first mainline game to receive official translation and release outside of Japan. Using the engine utilized in Z3, these games are independent of each other plot-wise.
Mobile games
Consists of X-Omega and DD. X-Omega is a departure from SRW's usual turn-based strategy formula, and is more similar to a defense-type game, where units are placed and commanded to defend against invading enemies. It is known to have an extremely large number of debuting series, and also have non-mecha anime crossovers.
DD returns to the usual SRW turn-based strategy formula, and battles are much more reminiscent of normal SRW games. However, players are only allowed to deploy 4 of their own units at a time, and instead of mechs being pulled from the gacha, attacks are instead.

== Recurring elements ==
=== Story ===
In most games, the player selects or is given a Banpresto original character and machine, who is connected to the overarching storyline which ties together the events of the constituent anime for the game. Some featured anime also has their plots intertwined: in Super Robot Wars Alpha, the White Fang from New Mobile Report Gundam Wing allies with Paptimus Scirocco's rebellion from Mobile Suit Zeta Gundam, resulting in the two enemy forces working together. The stories play out the events of the anime, albeit altered to make room for characters, settings, and plot elements from other shows. It is said that the events of each game are caused by incursions known as Dimension Quakes that started several years prior with the explosion of a "dimensional bomb", thereby constantly merging and separating the various universes without anyone knowing, and ensuring canonicity with both the other games and the properties they adapt.

One of the most notable recurring changes in the series is the near-complete absence of character death. Whenever the game gets to a point that a character died within their anime, the games will frequently use an element from another series to ensure the character's survival. This is likely done in order for the games to appeal to a broader audience.

=== Gameplay ===
Battles in Super Robot Wars are turn-based. The player usually gets to move their forces first, one at a time, then control switches to the game's AI. When a unit attacks, the target reacts by blocking (increasing defense against the attack), evading (reducing the attack's chance to hit), or countering (striking back with their own attack). Once chosen, the battle animation is played out. If the player unit is not destroyed and successfully damaged the enemy, then the unit gains experience points. All battles are carried out either the terrain of land, air, sea or space, which affects the performance of machines, pilots and weapons in various ways. The battlefield also contains objects which grant various effects. For example, besides providing repair and energy refill, a military base also provides land units with defense bonus but will hinder them from moving freely. In addition to standard mecha and vehicle units, the player often has one or more "Battleships", air- or spacecraft units that in addition to powerful long-ranged attacks, can also dock other units to refill energy, repair damage.

Units in-game are generally separated into two categories: "super-type" and "real-type". Super robots are heavy units with exceptionally high hit points and armor, and powerful, close-range weapons with high energy cost. On the other hand, real robots are light units which are faster and more agile, but have less armor and hit points, relying instead on dodging attacks. Their weapons have longer range and better accuracy at the cost of doing less damage per hit. Some units are treated as "support units", regenerating hit points and/or energy to allies, while battleships and carriers serve as transports or to resupply all units, while also providing powerful fire support. Though every unit takes a single grid on the tactical map and has little visual difference in battle animations, a larger unit gains defensive and offensive bonus against smaller units, but carry a disadvantage to evasion and accuracy. In later titles, certain attacks can bypass the size attribute, nullifying the effect of size in combat. Some units have other unique characteristics: for example, Getter Robo can transform into different forms with new weapons and different attributes.

Weapons carry various attributes other than range, accuracy modifier and attack power. All weapons can be divided into melee and shooting categories that determine its effectiveness by pilots' status. Other attributes can be affected by terrain or a target's defensive ability. In addition, some units make use of "MAP Weapons" which affect multiple squares at once, with some damaging everything in the area and others, such as Cybuster's Cyflash, ignoring allies. Some games feature weapons which inflict status effects on enemies that drain their energy, weaken their armor or damage the pilot's stats.

== History ==
=== Origins and development ===
In 1990, Japanese video game developer Banpresto released SD Battle Ōzumō: Heisei Hero Basho, the debut entry in its Compati Hero series, for the Family Computer (Famicom). A crossover between "super deformed" versions of Kamen Rider, Ultraman, and Mobile Suit Gundam, it was created as a congratulatory gift for Yukimasa Sugiura, who at the time had been promoted president of Banpresto. SD Battle Ōzumō enjoyed a commercial success in Japan, prompting Banpresto to create a more mature-oriented successor, Super Robot Wars, for the Game Boy in 1991. The original game borrowed several concepts from SD Battle Ōzumō, most notably its usage of characters from other Japanese entertainment properties. Its creation was also in part due to the popularity of both the Game Boy and Famicom in Japan, which continued to dominate the Japanese video game market. Banpresto turned the concept of Super Robot Wars into a franchise following its commercial success, beginning with 2nd Super Robot Wars several months later for the Famicom.

Banpresto outsourced development of earlier Super Robot Wars games to Japanese studio Winkysoft. Beginning with Super Robot Wars Complete Box in 1999, the company moved production in-house, with Banpresto's consumer game division Banpresoft handling development of future installments. Sugiura intended for 4th Super Robot Wars to be the final entry, however the franchise's lasting popularity prompted the creation of further sequels to meet demand. The company placed Takanobu Terada in the role of series producer; he at first showed little interest in its super-deformed character designs and gameplay structure. As Super Robot Wars sequels added more original character designs and its scope expanded, Terada showed more appreciation and embraced his role. Sugiura hoped the series could help introduce its players to the anime and manga series featured in each installment, commenting that he hoped it would "sell more and more for 20 years".

In 2005, Banpresto's parent company Bandai merged with Namco, creating Namco Bandai Holdings and subsequently Namco Bandai Games. Banpresto became a subsidiary of Namco Bandai Holdings in 2006, where it continued to develop Super Robot Wars games in addition to other projects. On April 1, 2008, Banpresto's video game operations were absorbed by Namco Bandai Games, with Banpresto being reorganized into a toy and prize machine developer. Terada and other Banpresto employees were transferred to Namco Bandai Games, as the company assuming control of the property. In 2011, Banpresoft and BEC (Bandai Entertainment Company) merged to form B.B. Studio, a subsidiary of Namco Bandai Games that would handle further production of the series.

=== Localization ===
The Super Robot Wars series has historically faced considerable challenges regarding international localization as the inclusion of numerous anime and manga properties within a single installment necessitates complex rights and licensing negotiations across various copyright holders. Until the release of Super Robot Wars V, the only entries in the franchise officially localized for English-speaking audiences were those belonging to the Original Generation subseries; these releases, then-branded in English using the franchise's original Japanese name Super Robot Taisen, do not feature the licensed anime or manga properties found in the mainline Super Robot Wars installments. (Note: Super Robot Wars OG Saga: Endless Frontier, a turn-based RPG spinoff of the Super Robot Wars series with an English release, included characters from Namco x Capcom and the Xenosaga series; both of these intellectual properties are owned by Monolith Soft, who also served as co-developers of Endless Frontier.)

In early 2016, Bandai Namco have announced that Super Robot Wars OG: Moon Dwellers and Super Robot Wars V will be given an English release for the Southeastern Asian version along with a Chinese translation. In December 2017, Bandai Namco announced that Super Robot Wars X would be released in English for Southeast Asia market in 2018. In November 2018, Bandai Namco announced that Super Robot Wars T will be released in English for Southeast Asian market in 2019. Super Robot Wars 30 has had a global release on the Steam platform in all regions, marking the first time in about 13 years that a Super Robot Wars game was released in such a manner.

== Reception and sales ==
As of April 2014, the Super Robot Wars series has exceeded 16 million copies across all platforms. The debut entry sold a combined 190,000 units and became a best-seller for the Game Boy during its first few weeks on the market. The best-selling entry is Super Robot Wars α on the PlayStation, having sold over 715,000 copies. Super Robot Wars games have become consistent best-sellers for both Banpresto and Bandai Namco, having regularly appeared on top sales charts in Japan as late as 2019. As of 2022, the series has shipped over 20 million copies worldwide.

Ollie Bardner, a writer for Eurogamer, described Super Robot Wars as "one of Japan's most enduring mecha series", showing appreciation towards its turn-based gameplay and large roster of mecha series and characters. Bardner believes part of the franchise's success is introducing its players to older mecha anime series: "Originally intended as a mere mecha anime crossover vehicle, Super Robot Wars has become something else. Not only has it facilitated new generations of gamers to discover brilliant anime from times long past, but also birthed unique games and anime in their own right." USgamer's Kat Bailey stated that the series serves as an "extremely faithful tribute" to the mecha genre and its history, writing that it "beautifully [remixes] everything from Mobile Suit Gundam to Voltron."

The games' main influence is the creation of animated shows influenced by original units and characters created for the games. The best examples are Getter Robo Armageddon, Shin Getter Robo vs Neo Getter Robo and the Mazinkaiser OVA, released in the United States in 2002. Shin Getter Robo first appeared in Ken Ishikawa's manga for Getter Robo Go, then became by its apparition in various Super Robot Wars games until receiving its aforementioned OVAs. Mazinkaiser appeared for the first time in Super Robot Wars F Final, released for the Sega Saturn and the Sony PlayStation in 1998, as an upgrade to the original Mazinger Z in order to allow the Mazinger franchise to compete with other super robots such as Shin Getter Robo. Mazinger Z writer and illustrator, Go Nagai, eventually implements it into his manga as the prototype of the other Mazinger machines, and the aforementioned OVA was also created.

The series was certified by the Guinness World Records for the "most intellectual property licenses used in a role-playing video game series".

== Related media ==
=== Music ===
JAM Project, consisting of veteran anime theme musicians, like Hironobu Kageyama, Rica Matsumoto, Eizo Sakamoto, Masaaki Endoh, Hiroshi Kitadani, Masami Okui and Yoshiki Fukuyama have also contributed to many Super Robot Wars soundtracks, usually providing the opening theme song and the song played over the closing credits. The series also spawned a set of concerts and albums called "Super Robot Spirits", where veteran vocalists—some of whom would go on to form JAM Project—sing covers of popular mecha anime openings, and in some cases, live versions of songs they themselves originally sang.

=== Anime ===
Masō Kishin Cybuster is a loose adaptation on the story of the first original Banpresto mecha in Super Robot Wars into a 26-episode series, featuring characters inspired by the allies of the Cybuster's pilot Masaki Andoh and original characters created for the anime. In May 2005, Banpresto released the animated OVA Super Robot Wars Original Generation: The Animation, a three-part non-canonical sequel to the second Original Generation game. In 2006, the OVA was followed up by Super Robot Wars Original Generation: Divine Wars, a retelling of the plot in the first Original Generation game. A variety of drama CDs, manga and model kits accompany the Original Generation lineup. In Fall 2010, Banpresto followed up with Super Robot Wars Original Generation: The Inspector, which is a retelling of the plot of Original Generation 2.

=== Manga ===
There have been several Manga adaptations that retell the stories of the Super Robot Wars series. Super Robot Wars Divine Wars (スーパーロボット大戦OG ディバイン・ウォーズ, Sūpā Robotto Taisen Ō Jī Dibain Wōzu) by Akihiro Kimura tells the story of the Divine Wars anime over 6 volumes published from 2006 to 2009. Meanwhile, Super Robot Wars Divine Wars - Record of ATX (スーパーロボット大戦OG ディバイン・ウォーズ Record of ATX, Sūpā Robotto Taisen Ō Jī Dibain Wōzu Recōdo Obu Ē Tī Ekkusu) is a manga series by Tatsunosuke Yatsufusa that tells a similar story but from the ATX Team's perspective. Super Robot Wars OG Chronicle (スーパーロボット大戦OGクロニクル, Sūpā Robotto Taisen Ō Jī Kuronikuru) is a series of short stories that take place across the Original Generation timeline, written and drawn by various authors, some of the stories from OG Chronicle were incorporated into the video game Super Robot Wars Original Generation Gaiden. Chokijin RyuKoOh Denki (超機人 龍虎王伝奇, Chōkijin Ryūkoō Denki), is a two-volume series by Masaaki Fujihara tells the background story for the original machines known as the Chokijin.

=== Net radio ===
SRWOG Net Radio - Umasugi Wave (スパロボOGネットラジオ うますぎWAVE, Suparobo Ō Jī Neto Rajio Umasugi Wēbu) began to air to go along with the release of the Divine Wars anime. The show has been airing since January 2007 with four regular hosts, Tomokazu Sugita, Masaaki Endoh, Mai Aizawa and Rie Saitou. The show often features series' producer Takanobu Terada as a special guest. After Divine Wars ended, the show carried on and was often used to regularly feature and promoted up and coming video game titles.
