= Super Robot Wars R =

2002 video game

- Developer(s): Banpresoft, AI
- Publisher(s): Banpresto
- Platform(s): Game Boy Advance
- Release: JP: August 2, 2002
- Genre(s): Tactical role-playing game

Super Robot Wars R (スーパーロボット大戦R, Sūpā Robotto Taisen Aaru) is a video game for the Game Boy Advance and is part of the Super Robot Wars franchise. It is the second game for the handheld system, preceded by Super Robot Wars A. Like its predecessor, it is ported into a mobile cellphone as part of the Super Robot Wars i line.

== Series Included ==
- Banpresto Originals
- Chōdenji Robo Combattler V
- Chōdenji Machine Voltes V
- Invincible Steel Man Daitarn 3
- Gear Fighter Dendoh (Debut)
- Shin Getter Robo vs Neo Getter Robo (Debut)
- Mobile Suit Zeta Gundam
- Mobile Suit Gundam ZZ
- Mobile Suit Gundam: Char's Counterattack
- Mobile Fighter G Gundam
- Gundam Wing: Endless Waltz
- After War Gundam X
- Mazinger Z (movies included)
- Great Mazinger
- Martian Successor Nadesico
- Martian Successor Nadesico: The Motion Picture – Prince of Darkness (Debut)
- Invincible Super Man Zambot 3

== Plot and characters ==
Depending on the player's choice, the game revolves around either Raul Gureden or Fiona Gureden, the pilot of the prototype rescue unit Excellence, alongside co-workers Raji Montoya and Mizuho Saiki. Equipped with the Time Flow Engine into the Excellence, the three ally with the Nadesico B or the Nahel Argama, hoping to promote their machine for funding towards further development. However, a mysterious being named Duminuss wishes to use the Time Flow Engine for its own purposes. Things take a turn for the worse when Raul/Fiona are accidentally sent to the past, where they have to make a decision to let history flow as it is or attempt to correct the events leading to the present, in order for a better future.

- Raul Gureden
  - The male protagonist, Raul is an optimistic pilot who believes in the path he walks. He shows a lot of affection for Mizuho, but is inexperienced in terms of showing his feelings for her. As of Super Robot Wars Original Generations, he is voiced by Go Inoue.
- Fiona Gureden
  - The female protagonist, she is Raul's female counterpart. Fiona keeps a close relationship with Raji Montoya, but somehow feels her position as a pilot hinders his research for the Time Flow Engine. As of Super Robot Wars Original Generations, she is voiced by Yuki Masuda.
- Raji Montoya
  - A researcher on the Time Flow Engine, Raji is responsible for handling and controlling the technology built into the Excellence. This energy otaku has a close friendship with Fiona. As of Super Robot Wars Original Generations, he is voiced by Hideki Odihara.
- Mizuho Saiki
  - The mechanic behind the Excellence, Mizuho is the developer behind the many frames the unit can utilize. As of Super Robot Wars Original Generations, she is voiced by Mariko Suzuki.

Unique to the protagonist machine Excellence is the ability to change into a variety of frames suited for different forms of combat and terrain. These frames include Cosmodriver (space), Striker (melee), Gunner (long-range), Flyer (air) and Diver (water). The final frame, depending on the chosen protagonist, is the Lightning (Raul) and Eternal (Fiona).

== Noteworthy ==
- The first game to feature a multi, frame-changing "Banpresto Original" machine.
- The only Banpresto-related title to place After War Gundam X's plot not in a post-apocalyptic setting (Super Robot Wars Alpha Gaiden and Another Century's Episode 3: The Final, along with the recently released Super Robot Wars Z, did).
- The first game to feature an OVA-based Getter Robo series (Shin Super Robot Wars used the manga variation)

== Connection To The Original Generation Universe ==
With the release of Super Robot Wars: Original Generations, elements from Super Robot Wars R were carried over to the Original Generation storyline. However, some changes were established, in order to keep continuity:

- Unlike Super Robot Wars R, Fiona exists alongside Raul, now as his twin sister.
- Two Excellence units exist, each for Raul and Fiona, rather than one. However, the Gunner and Diver frames do not appear at all.
- Super Robot Wars R's antagonist, Dyuminas, is more humanized and less condescending in the Original Generation universe. This is credited to the fact its creator called this version a failed product, dubbed "Dynamis3". Therefore, it is assumed this Dyuminas is not the same one as its Super Robot Wars R counterpart.

== Reception ==
On release, Famitsu magazine scored the game a 30 out of 40.
