= Super Robot Wars Original Generation: The Animation =

Japanese original video animation

- Official DVD cover of SRW OG: The Animation in North America

スーパーロボット大戦ORIGINAL GENERATION THE ANIMATION (Sūpā Robotto Taisen Orijinaru Jenerēshon Za Animēshon)
- Genre: Mecha
- Created by: Banpresto
- Original video animation
- Directed by: Jun Kawagoe
- Produced by: Koji Morimoto; Takanobu Terada; Tatsuyo Kobayashi; Yoshifumi Matsuda
- Written by: Satoru Nishizono
- Music by: Tsuneyoshi Saito
- Studio: Brain's Base
- Licensed by: NA: Media Blasters
- Released: 27 May 2005 – 23 December 2005
- Episodes: 3
- Audio drama

Super Robot Wars Original Generation: The Sound Cinema
- Studio: Lantis
- Original run: 10 October 2005 – 25 January 2006
- Episodes: 3

Super Robot Wars Original Generation: The Animation (スーパーロボット大戦ORIGINAL GENERATION THE ANIMATION, Sūpā Robotto Taisen Orijinaru Jenerēshon Za Animēshon) is a three-episode OVA that takes place after the events of Super Robot Taisen: Original Generation 2, a Game Boy Advance game featuring only original characters and mecha created by Banpresto for the Super Robot Wars franchise.

== Synopsis ==
Set after Original Generation 2, an unknown fleet of enemy mechs called Bartolls suddenly attacks the population of Earth, destroying all opposition, with millions of citizens instantly vanishing during the raids. ATX Team members Kyosuke, Excellen, and Bullet, along with Ryusei, Rai, and Aya of the SRX Team are sent to investigate, before the situation turns deadlier.

== Media ==
=== Anime ===
The anime OVA is made up of three episodes. Episode 1, titled "Swarm of the Bartoll", was released on 27 May 2005. Episode 2, titled "People = Parts", was released on 26 August 2005, and the final episode, "Prisoner of the Maze", was released on 23 December 2005. The OVA premiered on Toku in the United States on December 31, 2015.

The OVA was licensed for an English release in February 2013 by Media Blasters. It was released in 2007 by Bandai Visual USA.

In June 2014, it was streamed online with regional subtitles via Crunchyroll.

=== Drama CD ===
Along with the release of the three-episode OVA, Banpresto also produced a three-volume series of audio drama CDs entitled Super Robot Wars Original Generation: The Sound Cinema (スーパーロボット大戦 ORIGINAL GENERATION THE SOUND CINEMA). Besides short omake segments, the Sound Cinemas introduced a new subplot to the anime. Featured within this side story were mecha, such as the Astelion AX and the Mironga.

=== Printed ===
Printed manga from the animation released on 27 March 2007, Total 1 Book, ISBN 9784840238366

=== Other media ===
The PlayStation 2 sequel to the Original Generation remake Original Generations, Original Generation Gaiden, deals with the events of the OVA, with new content and some taken from the Super Robot Wars Original Generation: The Sound Cinema drama CD.

== Production ==
- Director: Jun Kawagoe
- Supervisor: Takanobu Terada
- Planning: Kazumi Kawashiro, Yasuhiko Yamaura
- Screenplay: Satoru Nishizono
- Original Character Design: Sachiko Kouno
- Original Mecha Design: Kazutaka Miyatake, Hajime Katoki, Saitou Kazue, Hitoshi Kamemaru, Hiroshi Ando, Junichi Moriya
- Character Design and Character Animation: Ryou Tanaka
- Mecha Design and Mecha Animation: Yasuhiro Saiki
- Music: Tsuneyoshi Saito
- Sound Director: Tooru Nakano
- Original Work: Banpresto
- Production: Brain's Base
