= Super Robot Wars 64 =

1999 video game

- Developer: AI
- Publisher: Banpresto
- Director: Jin Akabane
- Producer: Takanobu Terada
- Writer: Toshiya Kagami
- Composer: Michihiro Nomura
- Series: Super Robot Wars
- Platform: Nintendo 64
- Release: JP: October 29, 1999
- Genre: Tactical role-playing
- Mode: Single-player

Super Robot Wars 64 (Note: Japanese: スーパーロボット大戦６４, Hepburn: Sūpā Robotto Taisen Rokujūyon) is a tactical role-playing game for the Nintendo 64 and part of the Super Robot Wars series. It was released only in Japan in 1999, and features extensive connectivity with Super Robot Wars: Link Battler for Game Boy Color.

== Gameplay ==
Super Robot Wars 64 features the same tactical role-playing gameplay as other series entries, with players positioning various mecha units on a map to confront and defeat enemy forces. The game is the first entry in the Super Robot Wars series to introduce team attacks, allowing two units to attack an enemy simultaneously to achieve greater damage.

Players can use the Nintendo 64's Transfer Pak to exchange data with the Game Boy Color game Super Robot Wars: Link Battler. This includes sharing character experience points between games, as well as unlocking units that would otherwise be exclusive to each system.

== Plot ==
Like other games in the series, the setting of Super Robot Wars 64 blends characters and story elements from multiple mecha anime. It takes place on Earth in the year After Colony 195, and depicts a war between the human OZ faction and the alien Muge Zorbados Empire currently in control of the planet.

The game features four original protagonists the player can select from, split between two story routes: Arklight Blue and Selene Meneth follow the "Real Robot" route, while Brad Skywind and Manami Hamill follow the "Super Robot" route. Each protagonist has a unique rival character that will that will appear as a recurring opponent during the story. Choices made by the player in certain missions will trigger branching paths in the narrative.

== Development and release ==
Development on Super Robot Wars 64 began shortly before the completion of Super Robot Spirits (1997). The decision to include Game Boy connectivity was made to appeal to younger players, who would be able to train their robots in Link Battler and make them stronger to simplify encounters they struggled with in 64. The game's story was made darker than other series entries at the request of writer Toshiya Kagami. The developers implemented pseudo-3D backgrounds, but were limited in their presentation, inspiring the team to attempt more ambitious camera movements in later games like Super Robot Wars OG 2.

The game was publicly demonstrated at the 1999 Tokyo Game Show. It was released on October 29, 1999, and was frequently advertised alongside Link Battler, which was released earlier in the month.

== Reception ==
Reception

Review scores
Publication	Score
Famitsu	30/40
X64 Magazine	65%

On release, Famitsu magazine scored the game a 30 out of 40. Lionel Coen of French publication X64 praised the gameplay, but criticized the 2D artstyle, comparing it to games on the NES and SNES. As of May 2004, the game has sold 200,000 copies.
