= 3rd Super Robot Wars =

1993 video game

- Developer: Winkysoft
- Publisher: Banpresto
- Series: Super Robot Wars
- Platforms: Super Famicom; Sony PlayStation
- Release: Super Famicom: JP: July 23, 1993; PlayStation: JP: June 10, 1999
- Genre: Tactical role-playing
- Mode: Single player

3rd Super Robot Wars (第3次スーパーロボット大戦) was the third game in a series, the second in the "classic" canon, and the first on the Super Famicom, published on July 23, 1993. Along with 2nd and EX, 3rd Super Robot Wars was released on the Sony PlayStation on June 10, 1999, as part of Super Robot Wars Complete Box and June 22, 1999, as a stand-alone port.

== Story ==
The game take place after the 2nd Super Robot Wars, the Divine Crusaders reformed under the leadership of the Zabi family, led by Gihren Zabi, who plans to use the DC to create a dictatorship. However, as the Federation tries to deal with the resurgence of the DC, a new foe appears, the aliens which Bian Zoldark warned of.

== Featured series ==
- Mobile Suit Gundam
- Mobile Suit Gundam 0080: War in the Pocket (debut)
- Mobile Suit Gundam 0083: Stardust Memory (debut)
- Mobile Suit Zeta Gundam
- Mobile Suit Gundam ZZ
- Mobile Suit Gundam: Char's Counterattack
- Mobile Suit Gundam F91
- Mazinger Z
- Great Mazinger
- Grendizer
- Getter Robo
- Getter Robo G
- Brave Raideen (debut)
- Chōdenji Robo Combattler V (debut)
- Invincible Steel Man Daitarn 3 (debut)
- Banpresto Originals (original characters created for the game)

== New features ==
- Pilots can now pilot any unit from a series they were in. For instance, Emma Sheen can pilot any unit from the Universal Century Gundam series (since she debuted in Mobile Suit Zeta Gundam, which is part of the UC timeline), and Tetsuya Tsurugi can pilot any unit from the Mazinger canon.
- The interface and statistics for the robots and pilots were improved. Ammo and Energy (EN) are separate statistics, with many attacks having an ammo limit or an EN limit (which can be replenished during a battle by supply units), and movement during flight or space travel will drain energy.
- Robots can be upgraded for better performance.
- The story of the game now has multiple paths depending on choices made by the player, which can lead to different game scenario and changed storylines, including alternate endings.
- Depending on ending, the concept of a "True Final Boss" was introduced, with the player able to fight an extremely difficult extra boss if a certain ending is reached (a concept the series would use until Super Robot Wars Alpha Gaiden).
- Animations were somewhat improved, and backgrounds during battle now have detail.
