= Super Robot Wars A =

2001 video game

- Developers: AI (GBA); Banpresoft (PSP)
- Publishers: Banpresto (GBA); Bandai Namco Games (PSP)
- Platforms: Game Boy Advance, PlayStation Portable
- Release: Game Boy Advance: JP: September 21, 2001; PlayStation Portable: JP: June 19, 2008
- Genre: Tactical role-playing game

Super Robot Wars A (スーパーロボット大戦A, Sūpā Robotto Taisen Ē) is a video game for the Nintendo Game Boy Advance, part of Banpresto's Super Robot Wars franchise and the first to appear on the Game Boy Advance handheld; the letter "A" in the title stands for "Advance". It was ported onto mobile phones as part of the Super Robot Wars i collection in 2006. An enhanced remake of Super Robot Wars A was released for the PlayStation Portable on June 19, 2008, as Super Robot Wars A Portable.

== Featured series ==
- Banpresto originals
- Chōdenji Robo Combattler V
- Chōdenji Machine Voltes V
- Tōshō Daimos
- Invincible Steel Man Daitarn 3
- Metal Armor Dragonar (debut)
- Getter Robo
- Getter Robo G
- Shin Getter Robo (based on Banpresto's original design of Shin Getter Robo)
- Mobile Suit Gundam
- Mobile Suit Gundam: The 08th MS Team
- Mobile Suit Gundam 0083: Stardust Memory
- Mobile Suit Zeta Gundam
- Mobile Suit Gundam ZZ
- Mobile Suit Gundam: Char's Counterattack
- Mobile Fighter G Gundam
- Gundam Wing: Endless Waltz
- Mazinger Z
- Great Mazinger
- Grendizer
- Martian Successor Nadesico (debut)
- Invincible Super Man Zambot 3

== Plot and characters ==
The story of Super Robot Wars A revolves around an organization called the Shadow-Mirror, which exists in a parallel world where events happened in a different way than the original game world, thus making the state of the worlds different, though a bit similar at times. Its leader, Vindel Mauser, desires a world of eternal war to make humanity improve more through war. His plan is to send his agents towards another dimension, spy on the defense forces of the world in order to make adjustments on the attack, and eventually conquer it.

The player is given a choice as one of the two possible volunteers of the dimensional jump to the parallel world from the Shadow-Mirror universe and will later discover through their own way whether the Shadow-Mirror is right or wrong. There are two selectable characters:

- Axel Almer is one of the top agents of the Shadow-Mirror and is in a relationship with its top researcher, Lemon Browning. He used to be a cold-hearted, but dedicated soldier towards the belief of the Shadow Mirror. If chosen as the main protagonist, Axel will suffer amnesia due to his jump and will develop second thoughts on the Shadow-Mirror's intentions throughout the course of the game. The player may choose the Ash Saver or the Laz Angriff if playing on a real robot route or the Soulgain or Vaisaga on a super robot route. As of Super Robot Wars: Original Generations, he is voiced by Nobutoshi Canna.
- Lamia Loveless is an android created from Lemon's W-Series project, in the hopes she can create an artificial intelligence on par with humans. Lamia is the 17th creation, thus nicknamed "W17". As a machine, she is bound to orders, which is an obstacle towards Lemon's intended purpose on her. If chosen as the protagonist, Lamia's communication device will be damaged in the jump, causing her to develop a broken grammar speech pattern and unable to contact her superiors, allowing her freedom to move around in the mission, while enabling her to develop her own consciousness and making decisions of her own. Lamia can pilot any of the mechs Axel can, with the exception of the Soulgain; in its place is the Angelg. As in Super Robot Wars: Original Generations, she is voiced by Kaori Shimizu.

The original robots debuting in Super Robot Wars A are based on the original robots in Super Robot Wars 64. The player's choice of the main robot, regardless whether it is a super- or real-type, will affect the beginning of the game, as well as the choice of robots deployed by the enemy.

== Reception ==
Super Robot Wars A was released in Japan for the Game Boy Advance on September 21, 2001. The four reviewers in Famitsu scored the 8/10, 8/10, 8/10 and 9/10.
