= Super Robot Wars Alpha =

2000 video game

- Developer(s): Banpresoft
- Publisher(s): Banpresto
- Series: Super Robot Wars
- Platform(s): PlayStation, Dreamcast
- Release: PS: JP: May 25, 2000; DC: JP: August 30, 2001
- Genre(s): Tactical role-playing game

Super Robot Taisen Alpha, (Note: Japanese: スーパーロボット大戦α, Hepburn: Sūpā Robotto Taisen Arufa) is a 2000 tactical role-playing video game developed and published by Banpresto for the PlayStation. A version for the Dreamcast, Super Robot Wars for Dreamcast, was released a year later.

== Gameplay ==
Chronologically, Super Robot Wars Alpha is directly followed by Super Robot Wars Alpha Gaiden. The series continues on the PlayStation 2 with the 2nd Super Robot Wars Alpha and concludes with the 3rd Super Robot Wars Alpha: To the End of the Galaxy. Super Robot Wars Alpha is the first Super Robot Wars to feature fully animated attacks.

Super Robot Wars Alpha introduces the "Skill Point" (localized as "Battle Mastery") system, where decisions made in and out of battle can affect the game's difficulty and the player's chances of receiving and unlocking more powerful units and items. The game has around 100 chapters.

== Story ==
In the year 179 of the New Western Calendar, the One Year War breaks out between the Earth Federation and the Principality of Zeon, but is halted when an object crashes to Earth, landing on South Atalia Island. An investigative team from the Extra-Over Technological Investigative Institute discovers the object is an alien battleship with highly advanced technology. Despite the warnings of Dr. Bian Zoldark, the Federation hides the evidence of intelligent, extraterrestrial life, and uses the time to increase their military power. Bian founds the Divine Crusaders to utilize the Extra-Over Technology found on the ship to devise weapons capable of protecting the Earth from alien forces, should the planet become embroiled in a conflict.

During this time, economic troubles caused by the Federation's buildup sees the rise of many anti-Federation movements, such as the Neo-Zeon, who had retreated to the asteroid Axis. In response, the Federation establishes special forces units, such as the Titans and OZ. Other forces, such as the Demon Empire (from Brave Raideen) and Dr. Hell also threaten the Earth, but are pushed back by the teams of Mazinger Z, Getter Robo, and Raideen.

In the year 186, the Excelion battleship (from Gunbuster) battle a force of STMCs (Space Terrible Monster Crowd) when they are suddenly attacked by another alien fleet, known as the Aerogaters...

From this point on, the player can select from either a super robot or a real robot storyline, putting the player in command of the Grungust Type-2 or the Huckebein MK II, respectively.

== Super Robot Wars Alpha for Dreamcast ==
Super Robot Wars Alpha for Dreamcast (スーパーロボット大戦α for Dreamcast, Sūpā Robotto Taisen Arufa for Dreamcast), is an enhanced remake of the original Super Robot Wars Alpha that features 3D battle animations, in contrast with the PlayStation version's 2D sprites. The game has an increased difficulty on many stages and includes a new boss character. The game was supposed to be released on July 26, 2001, but was changed to August 30, 2001 instead due to need for more time to improve gameplay quality.

A new addition for the Dreamcast game is the inclusion of G-Breaker, a Super Robot from Bandai's Sunrise Eiyuutan video game. This marks the first time a Super Robot Wars game featured a mecha from a game produced by a different company.

== Promotion ==
Limited edition versions of the game have folding slipcase and filled with an artbook, Pocketstation wrist-strap, cell-phone handy strap and keychains, and ten metal key/watch/cell phone fobs of the Cybuster, Eva Unit-01, Combattler, Raideen, Gunbuster, Giant Robo, Wing Gundam Zero Custom, Dancougar, Mazinger and a Valkyrie.

== Reception ==
Reception

Review score
Publication	Score
Dorimaga	8.33/10

On release, Famitsu magazine scored the PlayStation version of the game a 31 out of 40, and the Dreamcast version a 30 out of 40.
