= Compati Hero =

Banpresto video game series

- Genres: Sports, platform, role-playing, strategy, racing
- Developer: Various
- Publisher: JP: Banpresto
- Platforms: Family Computer, Super Famicom, Game Boy, Game Boy Color, Sega Pico, PlayStation, GameCube, Dreamcast, PlayStation Portable, Nintendo 3DS, PlayStation 3, PlayStation Vita
- First release: SD Battle Ōzumō: Heisei Hero Basho; April 20, 1990
- Latest release: Lost Heroes 2 February 2, 2015

Compati Hero (Note: Japanese: コンパチヒーローシリーズ, Hepburn: Konpachi Hīrō Shirīzu) (Note: "Compati" is short for "Compatible") is a video game series published in Japan by Banpresto and Bandai Namco Entertainment that began in 1990 and features 16 crossover teams between Ultraman, Kamen Rider (also known as Masked Rider) and Gundam. Characters from other franchises have also been featured in some of the initial games, as well as in the Compati Sports series such as Mazinger, Getter Robo, Devilman and Godzilla.

It was the first video game series to involve a crossover between animated giant robots and live action tokusatsu heroes from different established franchises. The series makes this possible by using caricaturized versions of the characters (officially referred to as "SD" or "super deformed" characters), which allowed the different heroes and villains to co-exist and interact with each other without the need to reconcile their contrasting styles, settings, or sizes. This also made them appear cute. The first game in the series, SD Battle Ōzumō: Heisei Hero Basho for the Famicom, which mixed franchises that were originally licensed to Popy, was developed as a congratulatory present to Yukimasa Sugiura when he was promoted to president of Banpresto at the time, and was soon followed by series of spin-offs and related games featuring the same cast of characters that developed into the Compati Hero Series. The crossover was also possible due to Banpresto's parent company Bandai holding the merchandising rights for all the properties associated with the series.

The series was successful with children thanks to the SD Gundam craze, but after the release of Charinko Hero for the GameCube it took nearly eight years for the next Compati Hero game to release. Banpresto released a new game in the series titled Lost Heroes for the Nintendo 3DS and the PlayStation Portable in September 2012.

== List of video games ==
=== The Great Battle ===
Game	Details
SD The Great Battle Original release date(s): JP: December 29, 1990	Release years by system: 1990 – Super Famicom
SD The Great Battle Original release date(s): JP: December 29, 1990	Notes: The first game in the Great Battle series.; A top-down shoot 'em up with platforming elements.; A North American version titled The Great Battle was slated for a June 1992 release but ultimately cancelled.
The Great Battle II: Last Fighter Twin Original release date(s): JP: March 27, 1992	Release years by system: 1992 – Super Famicom
The Great Battle II: Last Fighter Twin Original release date(s): JP: March 27, 1992	Notes: A belt scrolling beat 'em up with two player co-op.; Introduces an original character named Fighter Roar.
Great Battle Cyber Original release date(s): JP: December 25, 1992	Release years by system: 1992 – Famicom
The Great Battle III Original release date(s): JP: March 26, 1993	Release years by system: 1993 – Super Famicom
The Great Battle III Original release date(s): JP: March 26, 1993	Notes: A belt scrolling beat 'em up with a fantasy setting.
Tekkyū Fight! The Great Battle Gaiden Original release date(s): JP: July 30, 1993	Release years by system: 1993 – Game Boy
The Great Battle Gaiden 2: Matsuri da Wasshoi Original release date(s): JP: January 28, 1994	Release years by system: 1994 – Super Famicom
The Great Battle IV Original release date(s): JP: December 17, 1994	Release years by system: 1994 – Super Famicom
The Great Battle IV Original release date(s): JP: December 17, 1994	Notes: A platforming game similar to Mega Man X
The Great Battle V Original release date(s): JP: December 22, 1995	Release years by system: 1995 – Super Famicom
The Great Battle V Original release date(s): JP: December 22, 1995	Notes: A shooting gallery game similar to Wild Guns.
The Great Battle VI Original release date(s): JP: April 11, 1997	Release years by system: 1997 – PlayStation
The Great Battle Pocket Original release date(s): JP: December 3, 1999	Release years by system: 1999 – Game Boy Color
Great Battle Fullblast Original release date(s): JP: March 1, 2012	Release years by system: 2012 – PlayStation Portable
Great Battle Fullblast Original release date(s): JP: March 1, 2012	Notes: Published by Bandai Namco
Lost Heroes Original release date(s): JP: September 6, 2012	Release years by system: 2012 – Nintendo 3DS, PlayStation Portable
Lost Heroes Original release date(s): JP: September 6, 2012	Notes: Published by Bandai Namco; A version of the game called Lost Heroes - Bonus Edition was released with limited editions of Lost Hereos 2
Lost Heroes 2 Original release date(s): JP: February 2, 2015	Release years by system: 2015 – Nintendo 3DS
Lost Heroes 2 Original release date(s): JP: February 2, 2015	Notes: Published by Bandai Namco

=== Battle Sports ===
Game	Details
SD Battle Ōzumō: Heisei Hero Basho Original release date(s): JP: April 20, 1990	Release years by system: 1990 – Famicom
SD Battle Ōzumō: Heisei Hero Basho Original release date(s): JP: April 20, 1990	Notes: A sumo wrestling game; Also includes Super Sentai characters
Battle Dodge Ball Original release date(s): JP: July 20, 1991	Release years by system: 1991 – Super Famicom, 1992 – Game Boy
Battle Dodge Ball Original release date(s): JP: July 20, 1991	Notes: Also includes characters from Dynamic Productions properties such as Mazinger Z
Battle Soccer: Field no Hasha Original release date(s): JP: December 11, 1992	Release years by system: 1992 – Super Famicom
Battle Soccer: Field no Hasha Original release date(s): JP: December 11, 1992	Notes: Also includes Godzilla characters
Battle Baseball Original release date(s): JP: February 19, 1993	Release years by system: 1993 – Famicom
Battle Baseball Original release date(s): JP: February 19, 1993	Notes: Also includes Godzilla characters
Battle Dodge Ball II Original release date(s): JP: July 23, 1993	Release years by system: 1993 – Super Famicom
Battle Soccer 2 Original release date(s): JP: November 25, 1994	Release years by system: 1994 – Super Famicom
Battle Crusher Original release date(s): JP: January 27, 1995	Release years by system: 1995 – Game Boy
Battle Pinball Original release date(s): JP: February 24, 1995	Release years by system: 1995 – Super Famicom
Battle Racers Original release date(s): JP: March 17, 1995	Release years by system: 1995 – Super Famicom
Battle Racers Original release date(s): JP: March 17, 1995	Notes: A racing game similar to F-Zero and Super Mario Kart
Battle Formation Original release date(s): JP: November 13, 1997	Release years by system: 1997 – PlayStation
Battle Dodge Ball 3 Original release date(s): JP: February 26, 2013	Release years by system: 2013 – PlayStation Portable
Battle Dodge Ball 3 Original release date(s): JP: February 26, 2013	Notes: Published by Bandai Namco; Only sold packaged with limited editions of Great Battle Fullblast

=== Super Hero ===
Game	Details
Super Hero Sakusen Original release date(s): JP: January 28, 1999	Release years by system: 1999 – PlayStation
Tokusatsu Bōken Katsugeki Super Hero Retsuden Original release date(s): JP: July 27, 2000	Release years by system: 2000 – Dreamcast
Tokusatsu Bōken Katsugeki Super Hero Retsuden Original release date(s): JP: July 27, 2000	Notes: Only includes Kamen Rider and Super Sentai characters
Super Hero Sakusen: Diedal's Ambition Original release date(s): JP: November 22, 2000	Release years by system: 2000 – PlayStation
Super Tokusatsu Taisen 2001 Original release date(s): JP: September 6, 2001	Release years by system: 2001 – PlayStation
Super Hero Generation Original release date(s): JP: October 23, 2014	Release years by system: 2014 – PlayStation 3, PlayStation Vita
Super Hero Generation Original release date(s): JP: October 23, 2014	Notes: Published by Bandai Namco

=== Other games ===
Game	Details
SD Hero Sōkessen: Taose! Aku no Gundan Original release date(s): JP: July 7, 1990	Release years by system: 1990 – Famicom
SD Hero Sōkessen: Taose! Aku no Gundan Original release date(s): JP: July 7, 1990	Notes: Also includes Metal Hero characters
Versus Hero: Kakutō-Ō e no Michi Original release date(s): JP: August 7, 1992	Release years by system: 1992 – Game Boy
Shuffle Fight Original release date(s): JP: October 9, 1992	Release years by system: 1992 – Famicom
Shuffle Fight Original release date(s): JP: October 9, 1992	Notes: This game does not include any Ultraman or Kamen Rider characters. Instead it includes characters from a large number of mecha anime, including Gundam, Mazinger Z, Heavy Metal L-Gaim, and more
Hero Senki: Project Olympus Original release date(s): JP: November 20, 1992	Release years by system: 1992 – Super Famicom
Hero Senki: Project Olympus Original release date(s): JP: November 20, 1992	Notes: First Compati Hero role-playing game
Gaia Saver: Hero Saidai no Sakusen Original release date(s): JP: January 28, 1994	Release years by system: 1994 – Super Famicom
Super Pachinko Taisen Original release date(s): JP: April 28, 1995	Release years by system: 1995 – Super Famicom, Game Boy
Super Tekkyū Fight! Original release date(s): JP: September 15, 1995	Release years by system: 1995 – Super Famicom
Ganbare! Bokura no Compati Heroes Original release date(s): JP: July 31, 1996	Release years by system: 1996 – Sega Pico
Charinko Hero Original release date(s): JP: July 17, 2003	Release years by system: 2003 – GameCube
Heroes' VS Original release date(s): JP: February 7, 2013	Release years by system: 2013 – PlayStation Portable
Heroes' VS Original release date(s): JP: February 7, 2013	Notes: Published by Bandai Namco
