= Super Robot Wars MX =

2004 video game

- Developer(s): Banpresoft
- Publisher(s): Banpresto
- Platform(s): PlayStation 2, PlayStation Portable
- Release: PlayStation 2: JP: May 27, 2004; PlayStation Portable: JP: December 19, 2005
- Genre(s): Tactical role-playing game
- Mode(s): Single player

Super Robot Wars MX (スーパーロボット大戦MX, Sūpā Robotto Taisen Emu Ekkusu) is a video game for the PlayStation 2. It is part of the Super Robot Wars series by Banpresto, and it was released on May 27, 2004. It was later ported to the PlayStation Portable on December 19, 2005, with minor gameplay tweaks, titled Super Robot Wars MX Portable.

== Overview ==
MX is also one of the few games in the franchise where the player does not have a choice of which "Banpresto Original" protagonist they can play. In this game, both original characters, Hugo Medio (voiced by Hiroki Takahashi) and Aqua Centolm (voiced by Yuri Shiratori), share the same machine, though there is still a choice of which two mechs to use: the super robot, Garmraid, or the real robot, Cerberus.

Another notable change in MX is the Mobile Suit Gundam series do not partake in any of the major events of the game. Other than G Gundam, which loosely links their endings (from which the MX storyline is set after the endings, according to the events of Super Robot Wars Impact) and plots to the "Banpresto Original" storyline, the other Gundam productions almost solely exist in purpose to support the other non-Gundam titles of MX. It departs from other Super Robot Wars productions where conflicts between various Gundam factions must be taken as part of the overarching storyline. There are only 2 other games in which a Gundam entry does not take a main role. They are Super Robot Wars W for the Nintendo DS and Super Robot Wars NEO for the Nintendo Wii.

=== Connections with previous games ===
Because of the series included in MX, it is often theorized the game was intended to be a direct sequel to Super Robot Wars Impact, since it includes several of the same series from that game, most notably Machine Robo. At the same time, both games feature the "Free Route" system: instead of following a completely linear progression, the player is able to choose what order to play certain scenarios in, potentially affecting the storyline or giving the opportunity to receive hidden units or characters. Additionally, MX and Impact use the same in-game font, and much of MX's soundtrack is remixed or rearranged from Impact's (a remixed version of the Impact theme is played in the final stages of the game, further supporting the theory). Some sprites and cut-ins from Impact are reused in MX; the most noticeable is arguably the God Gundam's sprite and the "God Finger" attack cut-in.

== Series Included ==
- Banpresto Originals (not a TV or movie series, independent timeline)
- Brave Raideen
- Gear Fighter Dendoh
- Getter Robo Series
  - Getter Robo (the Getter Queen appears as Michiru Saotome's unit)
  - Getter Robo G
- Gundam
  - Mobile Suit Zeta Gundam
  - Mobile Suit Gundam ZZ
  - Mobile Suit Gundam: Char's Counterattack
  - Mobile Fighter G Gundam
- Hades Project Zeorymer (Debut)
- Machine Robo: Revenge of Cronos
- Martian Successor Nadesico
  - Martian Successor Nadesico: The Motion Picture – Prince of Darkness
- Mazinger Series
  - Mazinger Z
  - Great Mazinger
  - Grendizer
  - Mazinger Movie Series
- Metal Armor Dragonar
- Neon Genesis Evangelion
  - The End of Evangelion
- RahXephon (Debut)
- Tōshō Daimos

== Noteworthy ==
- The first Super Robot Wars to include the "Favorite Series" system, which increases the upgrade limit and experience gain for all robots and pilots from one series (in MX Portable, players are offered the choice of three series).

== Reception ==
Super Robot Wars MX was the top-selling game in Japan in August 2004.

The PSP port of the game, Super Robot Wars MX Portable, was criticized for having long loading times.
