= Super Robot Wars Alpha Gaiden =

2001 video game

- Super Robot Taisen Alpha Gaiden
- Developer: Banpresoft
- Publisher: Banpresto
- Platform: PlayStation PlayStation Network
- Release: Original Release: JP: March 29, 2001; PSone Books: JP: December 5, 2002; PREMIUM EDITION: JP: April 28, 2005; PlayStation Network: JP: December 21, 2011
- Genre: Turn-Based Strategy RPG
- Mode: Single-player

Super Robot Wars Alpha Gaiden (スーパーロボット大戦α外伝, Sūpā Robotto Taisen Arufa Gaiden), or simply, Alpha Gaiden, is a video game for the PlayStation, first released in Japan in 2001. It is the first side-story in the Super Robot Wars Alpha series, continuing from Super Robot Wars Alpha. The characters of After War Gundam X, Turn A Gundam, and Combat Mecha Xabungle make debut appearances in the game.

== Summary ==
Super Robot Wars Alpha Gaiden includes what was the final appearance of the Masō Kishin "Banpresto Originals" in the Alpha series, and the last appearance of the characters, besides Masaki Andoh and the Cybuster, Shu Shirakawa and the Granzon, and Lune Zoldark and the Valsione until the Masō Kishin universe was revisited, first in the OG Saga update of The Lord of Elemental and then in the sequel Revelation of Evil God. Although many fans suspect this is due to a copyright backlash with Winkysoft, it is stated in an interview with the creator of Super Robot Wars he merely wants to give more plot attention towards the other original characters, considering the previous titles have dealt with the Masō Kishin plots rather extensively. Additionally, the game features the first appearance of Sanger Zonvolt, who later becomes one of the selectable protagonists of the 2nd Super Robot Wars Alpha.

Gameplay-wise, Alpha Gaiden is the first Super Robot Wars game where all the weapons of a unit are upgraded simultaneously, this would later go on to be used in almost every game made after Alpha Gaiden, save for the Original Generation games. Alpha Gaiden also introduces the Support ability for Attack and Defense, allowing units situated beside one another to attack after each other, or take an oncoming attacking. This ability would also go on to be used in almost every subsequent game.

== Story ==
Shortly after the events of Alpha, the Earth Federation has covered up many of the events in the climactic battle with the antagonist Aerogaters, but the gravity shock wave from the detonation of the Excelion (from Gunbuster) in the Battle of the Solar System's Absolute Defense is rapidly approaching the Earth, and threatens to wipe out the space colonies and the planet. The Earth's only hope is the Aegis System, which could shield the Earth Sphere from the shock wave.

Unfortunately, the heroes are sent to an alternate future, where the Earth has been ravaged by the wave. Faced with a new threat in the form of the Ancestors, the heroes must find a way to return to their time and prevent this alternate, dystopic future from happening.

== Series included ==
The following were included in AG:.

- Banpresto Originals (not a TV or movie series)
- Combat Mecha Xabungle (Debut)
- Dancouga – Super Beast Machine God
- Galaxy Cyclone Braiger (Debut)
- Getter Robo:
  - Getter Robo G
  - Shin Getter Robo
- Gundam:
  - Mobile Suit Gundam 0083: Stardust Memory
  - Mobile Suit Zeta Gundam
  - Mobile Suit Gundam ZZ
  - Mobile Suit Gundam: Char's Counterattack
  - Mobile Suit Victory Gundam
  - Gundam Wing: Endless Waltz
  - After War Gundam X (Debut)
  - Turn A Gundam (Debut)
- Macross:
  - Macross: Do You Remember Love?
  - Macross Plus
- Mazinger
  - Mazinger Z
  - Great Mazinger
  - Mazinkaiser
- Reideen the Brave
- Robot Romance Series:
  - Chōdenji Robo Combattler V
  - Voltes V
- The Unchallengable Daitarn 3

== Promotion ==
To promote the game, a limited-edition version was released on March 29, 2001 with an AG illustration board, binder, clear case, memory card sticker and 16 illustrations of various mecha series. A limited plastic Cybuster model was also released at various Softmap stores when gamers were able to pre-order at Akihabara, Shinjuku, Osaka, Omiya and Yokohama.

== Release and reception ==
Reception

Review score
Publication	Score
Famitsu	8/10, 8/10, 8/10, 8/10

Super Robot Wars Alpha Gaiden was released from the PlayStation in Japan on March 29, 2001.
