= List of Super Robot Wars video games =

This list provides an index of video game titles in Banpresto's Super Robot Wars franchise, known as Super Robot Taisen in Japan. Most of the games in the series are tactical role-playing games, but several games representing other genres were also released. List is divided by video game genre and ordered by initial release date. Only the original games, Neo Super Robot Wars and Super Robot Wars Compact, had final bosses that were not directly created by Banpresto.

== Tactical role-playing games ==
Game	Details
Super Robot Wars Original release date(s): JP: April 20, 1991	Release years by system: 1991 – Game Boy; 2014 – PlayStation 3 (PlayStation Network), PlayStation Vita (PlayStation Network)
Super Robot Wars Original release date(s): JP: April 20, 1991	Notes: The first game of the series, which only features sentient robots from the Universal Century Gundam series, Mazinger series and Getter Robo series. It is one of the only independent games in the series to feature a multiplayer mode; it was not done again until the release of Super Robot Wars XO. Unlike future games, the goal is to capture the enemy army's "tower," and Spirit Commands can only be used by the unit that is designated the team's "hero." The final boss of the game was the main villain from Great Mazinger vs. Getter Robo, Gilgilgan.; A remake of the title was released digitally for the PlayStation 3 and PlayStation Vita in 2014. While the game utilizes high-definition sprites, battle animations are rendered using immobile robots in a manner similar to titles released prior to Super Robot Wars Alpha. Gameplay changes include 13 new stages, Spirit Commands for all units (though the hero is given access to exclusive commands), the addition of Mazinger Z's Boss Borot to the starting Mazinger team, and new units such as the Full Armor Gundam and Cybuster.; Series premiered: Getter Robo, Getter Robo G, Mobile Suit Gundam, Mobile Suit Zeta Gundam, Mobile Suit Gundam ZZ, Mobile Suit Gundam: Char's Counterattack, Mobile Suit Gundam F91, Mazinger Z, Great Mazinger, Great Mazinger vs. Getter Robo
2nd Super Robot Wars Original release date(s): JP: December 12, 1991	Release years by system: 1991 – Family Computer; 1995 – Game Boy; 1999 – PlayStation; 2004 - Game Boy Advance; 2015 – Nintendo 3DS
2nd Super Robot Wars Original release date(s): JP: December 12, 1991	Notes: This title establishes many of the core gameplay mechanics of the series. It is the first to feature "Banpresto Original" characters and mechs, such as the Cybuster, piloted by Masaki Andoh. Ported to the Game Boy Advance as an exclusive Famicom Mini game and available as a bonus with the purchase of Super Robot Wars GC on the GameCube and later released digitally as a pre-order bonus for Super Robot Wars BX on Nintendo 3DS.; Series premiered: Grendizer, Mazinger Z vs. Devilman, Mazinger Z vs. The Great General of Darkness; A remake titled 2nd Super Robot Wars G, featuring an updated interface similar to 4th Super Robot Wars and two new series was released for Game Boy on June 30, 1995.; Series premiered: Mobile Suit Victory Gundam, Mobile Fighter G Gundam; It was again remade to be closer in style to F and F Final games and released in Complete Box edition, together with 3rd and EX titles, for PlayStation. After the bundled release it was also released separately in the same year.
3rd Super Robot Wars Original release date(s): JP: July 23, 1993	Release years by system: 1993 – Super Famicom; 1999 – PlayStation
3rd Super Robot Wars Original release date(s): JP: July 23, 1993	Notes: The first Super Robot Wars to include backgrounds during battles, discrete stats for pilots and units, and upgrades for units. In addition, this is the first Super Robot Wars to feature animated titles outside of Mazinger, Getter, and Gundam.; Series premiered: Reideen the Brave, Chōdenji Robo Combattler V, Invincible Steel Man Daitarn 3, Great Mazinger vs. Getter Robo G: Kuchu Daigekitotsu, Grendizer, Getter Robo G, Great Mazinger: Kessen! Daikaijuu, Mobile Suit Gundam 0080: War in the Pocket, Mobile Suit Gundam 0083: Stardust Memory.; It was remade to be closer in style to F and F Final games and released in Complete Box edition, together with 2nd and EX titles, for PlayStation. After bundled release it was also released separately same year.
Super Robot Wars EX Original release date(s): JP: March 25, 1994	Release years by system: 1994 – Super Famicom; 1999 – PlayStation; 2000 – PlayStation
Super Robot Wars EX Original release date(s): JP: March 25, 1994	Notes: The first title to focus on the Masō Kishin plot, and unique for having a "Multiple Scenario" system, wherein the order in which the player selects scenarios affects the plot. It is the first Super Robot Wars game to allow players to upgrade weapons.; Series premiered: Aura Battler Dunbine, GoShogun.; It was remade to be closer in style to F and F Final games and released in Complete Box edition, together with 2nd and 3rd titles, for PlayStation. After bundled release it was also released separately next year.; The EX in the title stands for Extra.
4th Super Robot Wars Original release date(s): JP: March 17, 1995	Release years by system: 1995 – Super Famicom; 1996 – PlayStation
4th Super Robot Wars Original release date(s): JP: March 17, 1995	Notes: The first title to feature a "Banpresto Original" protagonist alongside separate real robot and super robot paths. It is the first Super Robot Wars to feature items that can be equipped to a unit to improve its performance or restore hit points or energy. Additionally, most stages contain hidden items or credits on the map, which can be collected by moving a unit onto its location and the first title to allow players to manually decide whether to counterattack during enemy turns. The game marks debut of the Shin Getter Robo who first appears in the final volume of Getter Robo Go Manga. Ported to the PlayStation as the 4th Super Robot Wars Scramble and remade into Super Robot Wars F and Super Robot Wars F Final.; Series premiered: Tōshō Daimos, Dancouga – Super Beast Machine God, New Story of Aura Battler Dunbine, UFO Robot Grendizer vs. Great Mazinger, Gundam Sentinel, Heavy Metal L-Gaim, Invincible Super Man Zambot 3, Shin Getter Robo.; A remake titled 4th Super Robot Wars S, featuring voice acting and CG movies for the first time in the franchise, was released for PlayStation.
Super Robot Wars Gaiden: Masō Kishin – The Lord of Elemental Original release date(s): JP: March 22, 1996	Release years by system: 1996 – Super Famicom; 2010 – Nintendo DS; 2012 – PlayStation Portable
Super Robot Wars Gaiden: Masō Kishin – The Lord of Elemental Original release date(s): JP: March 22, 1996	Notes: The first Super Robot Wars title to give original characters the spotlight, exclusively. This particular title follows the storyline of the Masō Kishin and its cast. It is the first to feature non-superdeformed graphics, unlike most Super Robot Wars titles, and the first to feature a 45° angle view of the map (widely seen since). It is also the only regular game where a unit's elevation and the direction it is facing at the end of its turn are important. Does not include other real robot or super robot series.; The game was remade for the Nintendo DS under the name Super Robot Wars OG Saga: Masō Kishin – The Lord of Elemental bringing it closer to Original Generation series. The game features new, non-SD battle animations and retains many of its unique gameplay mechanics.; Namco Bandai also released a limited-edition bundle that paired a PSP version of the DS remake with its PSP sequel, Super Robot Wars OG Saga: Masō Kishin II – Revelation of Evil God that ups the visual quality and adds new mecha plus voice overs during battle animations.
Neo Super Robot Wars Original release date(s): JP: December 27, 1996	Release years by system: 1996 – PlayStation; 1997 – PlayStation
Neo Super Robot Wars Original release date(s): JP: December 27, 1996	Notes: This title is commonly referred to as Shin Super Robot Wars. "Neo" is the official English title, while "Shin" is taken directly from the game's transliterated name.; Features full-sized graphics (besides Super Robot Wars Gaiden: Masō Kishin – The Lord Of Elemental and the Scramble Commander games, this is the only title to do so), as well as the debut of the "Banpresto Original" SRX storyline. The final boss of the game was a Banpresto Original design of the main villain of Mobile Fighter G Gundam, Devil Gundam.; Series premiered: Blue Comet SPT Layzner, Chōdenji Machine Voltes V, Dino Mech Gaiking, Invincible Robo Trider G7, Mobile Suit Gundam Wing; In 1997 a special-edition version, titled Neo Super Robot Wars: Special Disk, with additional content, was released.
Super Robot Wars F Original release date(s): JP: September 25, 1997	Release years by system: 1997 – Sega Saturn; 1998 – PlayStation
Super Robot Wars F Original release date(s): JP: September 25, 1997	Notes: A partial remake of the 4th Super Robot Wars, rewritten to reflect the change of series included and the increased storage capacity of compact discs against read-only memory cartridges. Clearing the game allows players to carry over completion data over to F Final via the console's internal memory. The game was later ported to the PlayStation.; Series premiered: Neon Genesis Evangelion.; The F in the title stands for After.
Super Robot Wars F Final Original release date(s): JP: April 23, 1998	Release years by system: 1998 – Sega Saturn; 1999 – PlayStation
Super Robot Wars F Final Original release date(s): JP: April 23, 1998	Notes: The sequel to Super Robot Wars F, this game marks the end of the "Classic" storyline of Super Robot Wars. The Mazinkaiser makes it debut appearance in any medium. The game is also ported to the PlayStation.; Series premiered: Gunbuster, Gundam Wing: Endless Waltz, Space Runaway Ideon
Super Robot Wars Compact Original release date(s): JP: April 28, 1999	Release years by system: 1999 – WonderSwan; 2001 – WonderSwan Color
Super Robot Wars Compact Original release date(s): JP: April 28, 1999	Notes: The first Super Robot Wars to feature the "Select Scenario" system, which allows the player to decide the order which stages are played. It also introduces a system that randomizes every character's Spirit Command list based on the birthday and blood type specified in the Wonderswan's bios. It is the only other Super Robot Wars, aside from the first, to not feature a "Banpresto Original" design in any form or fashion. The final boss of the game was the main villain of Daitarn 3, Don Zauser.; Series premiered: Dancouga: Requiem for Victims and God Bless Dancouga; A remake, titled Super Robot Wars Compact for WonderSwanColor, was released for the WonderSwan Color. In addition to adding color graphics, audio and mechanics were changed to match that of the Compact 2 series of games.
Super Robot Wars 64 Original release date(s): JP: October 29, 1999	Release years by system: 1999 – Nintendo 64
Super Robot Wars 64 Original release date(s): JP: October 29, 1999	Notes: Uses non-animated 2D sprites over rendered 3D backgrounds during battle animations. Secret units can be acquired by linking with Super Robot Wars Link Battler, and the first to feature multiple-unit combination attacks.; Series premiered: Giant Robo: The Day the Earth Stood Still, Six God Combination Godmars, Mobile Suit Gundam: The 08th MS Team.
Super Robot Wars Compact 2 Original release date(s): JP: March 30, 2000; (Part 1: Earth Crisis), JP: September 14, 2000; (Part 2: Cosmoquake), JP: January 18, 2001; (Part 3: Galaxy Showdown)	Release years by system: 2000-2001 – WonderSwan
Super Robot Wars Compact 2 Original release date(s): JP: March 30, 2000; (Part 1: Earth Crisis), JP: September 14, 2000; (Part 2: Cosmoquake), JP: January 18, 2001; (Part 3: Galaxy Showdown)	Notes: The second game for WonderSwan system was divided into three chapters sold as separate games. Finishing each game allows the player to carry their completion data to the subsequent game via the Wonderswan's internal memory. Compact 2 was the first game in the series to feature the "Support Attack/Defend" system. All 3 chapters were remade and re-released on the PlayStation 2 as Super Robot Taisen Impact (Super Robot Wars Impact).: Series Premiered (Earth Crisis): Haja-Taisei Dangaioh, Ninja Senshi Tobikage, Dancouga: Blazing Epilogue; Series Premiered (Cosmoquake): Machine Robo: Revenge of Cronos
Super Robot Wars Alpha Original release date(s): JP: May 25, 2000	Release years by system: 2000 – PlayStation; 2001 – Dreamcast
Super Robot Wars Alpha Original release date(s): JP: May 25, 2000	Notes: The first Super Robot Wars to feature fully animated attacks and a more complex plot. It is also the first to include the "Skill Point" (localized as "Battle Mastery") system, where decisions made in and out of battle can affect the game's difficulty later and one's chances of unlocking and receiving more powerful units and items.; Series premiered: The End of Evangelion, Super Dimension Fortress Macross, Macross: Do You Remember Love?, Macross Plus, Mobile Suit Gundam F90; The Dreamcast remake of Super Robot Wars Alpha, features 3D battle graphics (Playstation uses sprite animation) and increased difficulty in many stages, including a secret boss character. Features the G-Breaker, a robot from Bandai's Sunrise Eiyuutan, which was not included in the PlayStation version of Super Robot Wars Alpha.; Series premiered: Sunrise Eiyuutan
Super Robot Wars Alpha Gaiden Original release date(s): JP: March 29, 2001	Release years by system: 2001 – PlayStation
Super Robot Wars Alpha Gaiden Original release date(s): JP: March 29, 2001	Notes: The first Super Robot Wars where all of a unit's weapons are upgraded simultaneously.; Series premiered: After War Gundam X, Turn A Gundam, Combat Mecha Xabungle, Galaxy Cyclone Braiger.
Super Robot Wars A Original release date(s): JP: September 21, 2001	Release years by system: 2001 – Game Boy Advance; 2008 – PlayStation Portable
Super Robot Wars A Original release date(s): JP: September 21, 2001	Notes: The first Super Robot Wars game to be released on the Game Boy Advance, this title is the first and only to give shields a separate HP rating. The game is one of the few that causes the same battle result to be produced even if the game is reset and reloaded. Later ported to the PlayStation Portable as Super Robot Wars A Portable and to FOMA cellphones as Super Robot Wars i.; Series premiered: Metal Armor Dragonar, Martian Successor Nadesico; The A in the title either stands for Advance or Another.; An enhanced remake titled Super Robot Wars A Portable was released for PlayStation Portable. Remake uses Original Generations' graphics engine and alters gameplay mechanics: removes separate HP rating from shields, introduces "Successive Target Adjustment" system where each missed attack increases chance to hit for successive attack. Some of the remake's art assets were taken from previous titles.; GBA version developed by A.I
Super Robot Wars Impact Original release date(s): JP: March 28, 2002	Release years by system: 2002 – PlayStation 2
Super Robot Wars Impact Original release date(s): JP: March 28, 2002	Notes: A remake of all three chapters of Super Robot Wars Compact 2 that uses Alpha Gaiden's battle animation engine. It features new scenarios, increasing the stage count to more than 100, and adds Martian Successor Nadesico, Mobile Fighter G Gundam and original character Einst Alfimi to the game's story.
Super Robot Wars R Original release date(s): JP: August 2, 2002	Release years by system: 2002 – Game Boy Advance
Super Robot Wars R Original release date(s): JP: August 2, 2002	Notes: Ported to FOMA cellphones as Super Robot Wars i.; Series premiered: Gear Fighter Dendoh, Shin Getter Robo vs Neo Getter Robo, Martian Successor Nadesico: The Motion Picture – Prince of Darkness; The R in title stands for Reversal.; Developed by A.I
Super Robot Taisen: Original Generation Original release date(s): JP: November 22, 2002; NA: August 8, 2006	Release years by system: 2002 – Game Boy Advance
Super Robot Taisen: Original Generation Original release date(s): JP: November 22, 2002; NA: August 8, 2006	Notes: This title is the first in the Original Generation sub-series, which focuses on the original (not derived from anime) story elements featured in previous Super Robot Wars games. Original Generation is the first handheld Super Robot Wars to feature animated attacks and the equipment system, which allows players to change weapons between real robots. It is also the first Super Robot Wars to ever be released officially in North America by Atlus, as Super Robot Taisen: Original Generation and remade on the PlayStation 2 as part of Super Robot Wars: Original Generations.
2nd Super Robot Wars Alpha Original release date(s): JP: March 27, 2003	Release years by system: 2003 – PlayStation 2
2nd Super Robot Wars Alpha Original release date(s): JP: March 27, 2003	Notes: The first Super Robot Wars using the "Squad System", allowing players to arrange squads (up to 4 units acting as a single unit) to participate in battles.; During development, the manga Gundam Sentinel was to be included, but was scrapped. Because of this, unused data and graphics for Gundam Sentinel exist in the game's files.; Series premiered: Brain Powerd, Mobile Suit Crossbone Gundam, The King of Braves GaoGaiGar, Steel Jeeg
Super Robot Wars Compact 3 Original release date(s): JP: July 17, 2003	Release years by system: 2003 – WonderSwan Color
Super Robot Wars Compact 3 Original release date(s): JP: July 17, 2003	Notes: Though New Story of Aura Battler Dunbine's mecha were featured in prior installments, this is the first title to utilize the OVA's plot and characters. It is one of the only games in the series that does not feature outer space missions.; Series premiered: Acrobunch, Betterman, The Vision of Escaflowne, Mechander Robo
Super Robot Wars D Original release date(s): JP: August 8, 2003	Release years by system: 2003 – Game Boy Advance
Super Robot Wars D Original release date(s): JP: August 8, 2003	Notes: The first Super Robot Wars to feature the "Chain Attack" system, where enemy units lined up in a row can be struck down simultaneously with designated melee attacks. It is also notorious for giving super robots and real robots nearly-identical armor stats, resulting in a heavy bias toward the latter.; Series premiered: The Big O, Future Robot Daltanious, Getter Robo Armageddon, Macross 7, Megazone 23 Part 1 and Part 2, Six God Combination Godmars: The Untold Legend; The D in the title stands for Destiny.; Developed by A.I
Super Robot Wars MX Original release date(s): JP: May 27, 2004	Release years by system: 2004 – PlayStation 2; 2005 – PlayStation Portable
Super Robot Wars MX Original release date(s): JP: May 27, 2004	Notes: The first Super Robot Wars to include the "Favorite Series" system, which increases the upgrade limit and experience gain for all robots and pilots from a selected series. Originally intended to be a direct sequel to Super Robot Wars Impact.; Ported to PlayStation Portable as Super Robot Wars MX Portable with minor gameplay adjustments and some additional levels.; Series premiered: Hades Project Zeorymer, RahXephon; The MX in the title stands for Maximum Impact.
Super Robot Wars GC Original release date(s): JP: December 16, 2004	Release years by system: 2004 – Nintendo GameCube; 2006 – Xbox 360
Super Robot Wars GC Original release date(s): JP: December 16, 2004	Notes: Like the Dreamcast port of Super Robot Wars Alpha, this game boasts fully 3-D battle scenes; in addition, it includes a new battle system where some pilots can target the head, arms, legs or body of a machine specifically, as well as the ability to capture disabled enemy units for sale or for the player's use.; Series premiered: Galactic Gale Baxingar, Galactic Whirlwind Sasuraiger, Saikyo Robo Daioja, Mazinkaiser (Anime OVA), Matchless Raijin-Oh; The GC in the title stands for GameCube.; An enhanced port titled Super Robot Wars XO was released for Xbox 360, it is the first game in the series to feature an online multiplayer mode. The XO in the title stands for Xbox Online.
Super Robot Taisen: Original Generation 2 Original release date(s): JP: February 3, 2005; NA: November 14, 2006	Release years by system: 2005 – Game Boy Advance
Super Robot Taisen: Original Generation 2 Original release date(s): JP: February 3, 2005; NA: November 14, 2006	Notes: A direct sequel to the first Original Generation game which features story elements from Compact 2, Impact, and Alpha 2. It is also the second Super Robot Wars to ever be released officially in North America by Atlus, as Super Robot Taisen: Original Generation 2 and re-released on the PlayStation 2 as part of Super Robot Wars: Original Generations.
3rd Super Robot Wars Alpha: To the End of the Galaxy Original release date(s): JP: July 28, 2005	Release years by system: 2005 – PlayStation 2
3rd Super Robot Wars Alpha: To the End of the Galaxy Original release date(s): JP: July 28, 2005	Notes: The end of the Super Robot Wars Alpha series. Virtual On's inclusion makes this title the first to feature a video game series not related to Namco Bandai or any of its subsidiaries.; Series premiered: Cyber Troopers Virtual-On Oratorio Tangram, Cyber Troopers Virtual-On Marz, The King of Braves GaoGaiGar Final, Mobile Suit Gundam SEED.
Super Robot Wars J Original release date(s): JP: September 15, 2005	Release years by system: 2005 – Game Boy Advance
Super Robot Wars J Original release date(s): JP: September 15, 2005	Notes: The last Super Robot Wars game to be released on the Game Boy Advance, and the first title to exclude every series featured in the original Super Robot Wars; the Getter Robo franchise is omitted entirely, the Gundam franchise is represented entirely by alternate universe series instead of a Universal Century one, and the Mazinger franchise is represented by the Mazinkaiser OVAs. This game also marks the debut of characters from animated series using "powered armor", Tekkaman Blade.; Series premiered: Full Metal Panic!, Full Metal Panic? Fumoffu, Mazinkaiser vs. The Great General of Darkness, Tekkaman Blade.; The J in the title stands for Judgment.; Developed by A.I
Super Robot Wars W Original release date(s): JP: March 1, 2007	Release years by system: 2007 – Nintendo DS
Super Robot Wars W Original release date(s): JP: March 1, 2007	Notes: The first Super Robot Wars to utilize two screens and the first game to feature no robots dating before 1980. This game is also notorious for the amount of bugs that can be used heavily to the player's advantage. Many of the game's audio and visual assets are taken from Super Robot Wars J.; Features a music track plagiarized from Warcraft II: Tides of Darkness which didn't get noticed until Super Robot Wars K and it's plagiarizing of music tracks; Series premiered: Tekkaman Blade II, Beast King GoLion, Detonator Orgun, Mobile Suit Gundam SEED Astray, Mobile Suit Gundam SEED X Astray, Full Metal Panic! The Second Raid; The W in the title is the Japanese abbreviation for "Double", a reference to the fact that it contains a time skip in the game and one of two final bosses can be chosen in the final level.
Super Robot Wars: Original Generations Original release date(s): JP: June 28, 2007	Release years by system: 2007 – PlayStation 2
Super Robot Wars: Original Generations Original release date(s): JP: June 28, 2007	Notes: An enhanced remake of the first two Original Generation titles, with several extra stages included to show the goings-on of other members of the cast, as well as 11 new stages upon completion of certain requirements. The remake introduces the "Twin Battle System", which allows for two battles to be conducted against the same enemy by two allies simultaneously, and the introduction of a seventh Spirit Command, known as the "Twin Command".
Super Robot Wars Original Generation Gaiden Original release date(s): JP: December 27, 2007	Release years by system: 2007 – PlayStation 2
Super Robot Wars Original Generation Gaiden Original release date(s): JP: December 27, 2007	Notes: A direct sequel to Super Robot Wars Original Generations, it details the events of the bonus segment in Original Generations. Also available is the "Shuffler Battle Mode", an all-new mini card game, based on the original characters and mechs, and the inclusion of a "Free Battle Mode", where players can set their own scenario by placing allied or enemy mechs on the battlefield of their choosing.
Super Robot Wars Z Original release date(s): JP: September 25, 2008	Release years by system: 2008 – PlayStation 2
Super Robot Wars Z Original release date(s): JP: September 25, 2008	Notes: The first Super Robot Wars title to be created under Namco Bandai (excluding spin-offs, ports and remakes) and the start of the Z series. It was once known for having the largest number of debuting series in a single game, only to be beaten by the mobile game Super Robot Wars X-Omega. Battle animations are affected by whether engaging parties are airborne or on the ground, and in the case of certain attacks, whether or not they are used to land the final blow. It is the 20th-best-selling game of Japan in 2008.; Series premiered: Super Dimensional Century Orguss, Super Heavy God Gravion, Super Heavy God Gravion Zwei, Genesis of Aquarion, Psalm of Planets Eureka Seven, Overman King Gainer, Space Warrior Baldios, Space Emperor God Sigma, The Big-O: 2nd Season; The Z in the title stands for Zone/Zodiac/Zenith.
Super Robot Wars Z: Special Disk Original release date(s): JP: March 5, 2009	Release years by system: 2009 – PlayStation 2
Super Robot Wars Z: Special Disk Original release date(s): JP: March 5, 2009	Notes: Release features additional missions, "Challenge Battles" (scenarios testing players' strategic/tactical decisions), a "Battle Viewer" (similar to Original Generation Gaiden's "Free Battle Mode"), a "Special Theater" displaying art work and concept designs for Z's original characters and robots and a library displaying all of the game's characters and robots. An exclusive unit is "XAN", a variation of the titular mecha from Overman King Gainer. This release does not feature the original game and most of the content will depend on how much the player has achieved in the original.
Super Robot Wars K Original release date(s): JP: March 20, 2009	Release years by system: 2009 – Nintendo DS
Super Robot Wars K Original release date(s): JP: March 20, 2009	Notes: Features the "Partner Battle System", somewhat similar to Original Generations' "Twin Battle System". Infamous for featuring music tracks plagiarized from Chrono Trigger and Lufia II: Rise of the Sinistrals. Public apology was issued after few months of release.; Series premiered: Fafner in the Azure, Mobile Suit Gundam SEED C.E. 73: Stargazer, Kotetsushin Jeeg, Gun Sword, Gaiking: Legend of Daiku-Maryu, Zoids: Genesis; The K in the title stands for Krystal/Crystal.
Super Robot Wars NEO Original release date(s): JP: October 29, 2009	Release years by system: 2009 – Wii
Super Robot Wars NEO Original release date(s): JP: October 29, 2009	Notes: Not to be confused with the PlayStation Neo Super Robot Wars. It is the only title to not feature any "real robot" series, and Shippu! Iron Leaguer marks the first non-combat oriented series to be featured. This is the only game in the series to utilize a radial-based movement system, as opposed to the grid-based system of other titles.; Series premiered: New Getter Robo, Jushin Liger, NG Knight Ramune & 40, Genki Bakuhatsu Ganbaruger, Nekketsu Saikyō Go-Saurer, Kanzen Shouri Daiteioh, Shippū! Iron Leaguer, Haō Taikei Ryū Knight.
Super Robot Wars L Original release date(s): JP: November 25, 2010	Release years by system: 2010 – Nintendo DS
Super Robot Wars L Original release date(s): JP: November 25, 2010	Notes: Like Super Robot Wars J, this game features no series from the original Super Robot Wars and omits the Getter Robo franchise. This title attempts to enhance the Partner Battle system by weakening combo attacks for solo robots and giving each unit a unique bonus when partnered with another unit. It is the first game to exclude equitable items since their introduction to the series and notably has the highest amount of ecchi-oriented mecha titles in the cast list of any game in the franchise.; This series is notably the last of the colored style to differ protagonist, antagonist, and third parties.; Series premiered: Rebuild of Evangelion 1 & 2, Fight! Iczer One, Iczer Reborn, Dancouga Nova – Super God Beast Armor, Macross Frontier, Linebarrels of Iron.; The L in the title stands for Link.
2nd Super Robot Wars Z Original release date(s): JP: April 14, 2011; (Ruination), JP: April 5, 2012; (Regeneration)	Release years by system: 2011-2012 – PlayStation Portable
2nd Super Robot Wars Z Original release date(s): JP: April 14, 2011; (Ruination), JP: April 5, 2012; (Regeneration)	Notes: The direct sequel to Super Robot Wars Z. 2nd Z is divided into separate parts in a manner similar to F/F Final and the Compact 2 series. The game series consists of the two chapters: Ruination (破界篇, Hakai Hen; "Destruction Chapter") and Regeneration (再世篇, Saisei Hen; "Regeneration Chapter"). Notably it is the only non-Original Generation entry in the franchise not to use a unit originating from a licensed series used (Macross Dynamite 7), rather only its soundtrack. The first part is the best-selling handheld SRW to date.; An upcoming modern remaster of the game is announced during the 35th anniversary livestream, starting with Ruination Chapter.; Series Premiered (Ruination): Armored Trooper Votoms, Armored Trooper Votoms: The Red Shoulder, Armored Trooper Votoms: Red Shoulder Document: Roots of Ambition, Armored Trooper Votoms: Pailsen Files, Mobile Suit Gundam 00 (Season 1), Mazinger Edition Z: The Impact!, Dai-Guard, Code Geass: Lelouch of the Rebellion, Macross Frontier: The False Songstress, Psalm of Planets Eureka Seven: Good Night, Sleep Tight, Young Lovers, Gurren Lagann, Gurren Lagann The Movie: Childhood's End.; Series Premiered (Regeneration): Mobile Suit Gundam 00 (Season 2), Macross Dynamite 7, Code Geass: Lelouch of the Rebellion R2, New Tetsujin-28, Macross Frontier: The Wings of Goodbye, Gurren Lagann The Movie: The Lights in the Sky are Stars.
Super Robot Wars OG Saga: Masō Kishin II – Revelation of Evil God Original release date(s): JP: January 12, 2012	Release years by system: 2012 – PlayStation Portable
Super Robot Wars OG Saga: Masō Kishin II – Revelation of Evil God Original release date(s): JP: January 12, 2012	Notes: The direct sequel to the DS remake Super Robot Wars OG Saga: The Lord of Elemental, which expands the series's storyline about the Three Pillar Gods (Volkluss, Rasfitoto, and Gragios).; Namco Bandai also released a limited edition bundle that paired this with the PSP version of the first game, that upped the visual quality and added new mecha plus voice overs during battle animations.
2nd Super Robot Wars Original Generation Original release date(s): JP: November 29, 2012	Release years by system: 2012 – PlayStation 3
2nd Super Robot Wars Original Generation Original release date(s): JP: November 29, 2012	Notes: Not to be confused with the Game Boy Advance Super Robot Taisen: Original Generation 2, this is the first Super Robot Wars Game announced for the PS3 and includes the storylines of D, MX, the second half of 2nd Super Robot Wars Alpha, Lost Children, the beginning of 3rd Super Robot Wars Alpha, Real Robot Regiment, F, part of F Final, and Super Robot Wars Original Generation: The Inspector. This is also the second game to utilize 2D Sprites in an 3D background, similar to Super Robot Wars 64. The game came in both regular and Complete Box Editions. The Complete Box edition contains 4 Blu-ray Discs containing all the episodes of Super Robot Wars Original Generation: The Inspector, a booklet and a special package drawn by Ebata Risa.; A DLC pack titled Dark Prison was released together with limited edition of Super Robot Wars OG Infinite Battle and was available on April 17, 2014.
Super Robot Wars UX Original release date(s): JP: March 14, 2013	Release years by system: 2013 – Nintendo 3DS
Super Robot Wars UX Original release date(s): JP: March 14, 2013	Notes: It is the first to use a mecha series based on an Eroge Visual Novel and the first non-Original Generation title not to have any incarnation of Mazinger Z in the game. The game also includes Fei-Yen HD, a Hatsune Miku variant of the Virtualoid Fei-Yen from the PlayStation Portable game Hatsune Miku: Project DIVA Extend, making it the first and only Vocaloid to appear in the SRW series. The game introduces the Tactician system, which allows the player to select one character to serve as the team's tactician; each eligible character provides a different benefit to the team.; Series premiered: Heroman, Demonbane, The Wings of Rean, Fafner in the Azure Dead Agressor: Heaven and Earth, Cyber Troopers Virtual-On Featuring Fei-Yen HD, Mobile Suit Gundam 00 the Movie: A Wakening of the Trailblazer, SD Gundam Sangokuden Brave Battle Warriors, Mazinkaizer SKL.; The UX in the title stands for Union Cross.
Super Robot Wars Operation Extend Original release date(s): JP: July 18, 2013	Release years by system: 2013 – PlayStation Portable (PlayStation Network)
Super Robot Wars Operation Extend Original release date(s): JP: July 18, 2013	Notes: This title, only downloadable from the PlayStation Store, consists of 8 chapters that can either be bought and downloaded separately or purchased as a single unit. The title's gameplay systems are taken from Super Robot Wars Neo, while the game's scenario structure features both numbered major missions and smaller, non-numbered minor missions. The Banpresto Original mecha Cybuster also appears as a playable character, making it the first non-Original Generation game to feature it since Alpha Gaiden.; Series premiered: Zoids: Chaotic Century, Zoids: New Century, Mobile Police Patlabor, Patlabor: The Movie, Keroro Gunsou.
Super Robot Wars OG Saga: Masō Kishin III – Pride of Justice Original release date(s): JP: August 22, 2013	Release years by system: 2013 – PlayStation 3, PlayStation Vita
Super Robot Wars OG Saga: Masō Kishin III – Pride of Justice Original release date(s): JP: August 22, 2013	Notes: The third Masō Kishin game and the first Super Robot Wars title for the PlayStation Vita. The series features a save transfer system, which allows players to transfer save files from the PS3 to the Vita. The game's plot focuses on the search for the Third Pillar God of La Gias (Gragios) and the secrets behind the Volkruss Cult.
3rd Super Robot Wars Z Original release date(s): JP: April 10, 2014; (Hell Chapter), JP: April 2, 2015; (Heaven Chapter)	Release years by system: 2014 – PlayStation 3, PlayStation Vita
3rd Super Robot Wars Z Original release date(s): JP: April 10, 2014; (Hell Chapter), JP: April 2, 2015; (Heaven Chapter)	Notes: The third and final Sequel to the Z series and like the second, it is also divided into separate parts in a manner similar to F/F Final and the Compact 2 series. The first chapter is the Hell (時獄) Chapter and the second chapter is the Heaven (天獄) Chapter. Bandai Namco released a joke trailer on April 1, 2014 in which the first game was translated in English to Time of Hell. It is the first game in the franchise to use only character and story elements from a license without using any units or soundtracks from it in the gameplay (Armored Trooper VOTOMS: Phantom Arc).; Series Premiered (Hell Chapter): Armored Trooper Votoms: Big Battle, Armored Trooper Votoms: Shining Heresy, Aquarion Evol, Mobile Suit Gundam Unicorn, Shin Mazinger Zero.; Series Premiered (Heaven Chapter): Armored Trooper VOTOMS: Phantom Arc, Armored Trooper VOTOMS: Alone Again, Diebuster, Evangelion: 3.0 You Can (Not) Redo, Full Metal Panic! (Light Novels), Gargantia on the Verdurous Planet.
Super Robot Wars OG Saga: Masō Kishin F – Coffin of the End Original release date(s): JP: August 28, 2014	Release years by system: 2014 – PlayStation 3
Super Robot Wars OG Saga: Masō Kishin F – Coffin of the End Original release date(s): JP: August 28, 2014	Notes: The final game to the Masō Kishin series, which skips the PlayStation Vita release and the save transfer system. It includes elements from Winkysoft's other franchise, Rayblade in the form of the new Masouki, Raveraid. Amara from 2nd Super Robot Wars Original Generation officially returns in the sequel along with the Garilnagant. The game revolves around the Ancient Giants, the true form of the Pillar Gods and the mysterious attacks occurring in La Gias.: The F in the title stands for Finale.
Super Robot Wars BX Original release date(s): JP: August 20, 2015	Release years by system: 2015 – Nintendo 3DS
Super Robot Wars BX Original release date(s): JP: August 20, 2015	Notes: The second Super Robot Wars game to be released on the Nintendo 3DS, it marks the return of a Universal Century-based Gundam series in a handheld title in years since Super Robot Wars D.: Series premiered: Giant Gorg, Panzer World Galient, Macross 30: Voices across the Galaxy, Mobile Suit Gundam AGE (Kio Arc), SD Gundam Gaiden, King of Braves GaoGaiGar: Blockaded Numbers; The BX in the title stands for Border Cross.
Super Robot Wars OG: The Moon Dwellers Original release date(s): JP: June 30, 2016	Release years by system: 2016 – PlayStation 4, PlayStation 3
Super Robot Wars OG: The Moon Dwellers Original release date(s): JP: June 30, 2016	Notes: The first title released in commemoration of the series' 25th anniversary, it is the first Super Robot Wars game to be released on the PlayStation 4 platform and covers all the events from Super Robot Wars J, Super Robot Wars GC/XO, the beginning of 3rd Super Robot Wars Alpha: To the End of the Galaxy and Great Battle 2. It is the first console Super Robot Wars game to be released in English and Chinese.
Super Robot Wars V Original release date(s): JP: February 23, 2017; (PS4, PSV): JP: October 3, 2019; (Switch, Steam)	Release years by system: 2017 – PlayStation 4, PlayStation Vita 2019 – Nintendo Switch, Steam
Super Robot Wars V Original release date(s): JP: February 23, 2017; (PS4, PSV): JP: October 3, 2019; (Switch, Steam)	Notes: The second title released in commemoration of the series' 25th anniversary, it is the second Super Robot Wars game to be released on the PlayStation 4 platform. It is also the first game released on PC. It marks the return of Mobile Suit Gundam ZZ into the series proper, The Brave Express Might Gaine marks the second debut of a Brave series, and Space Battleship Yamato 2199 is the first non-mecha space opera series to debut in the game. It is the first console non-OG Super Robot Wars game to be released in English. The game also marks the debut of the Mazin Emperor G, the second game-original Mazinger mecha since Mazinkaiser. It also features the original to the series itself Huckebein and Grungust, making it the first non-OG game to feature both units.; Series premiered: Mobile Suit Crossbone Gundam: Skull Heart, Mobile Suit Crossbone Gundam: Steel 7, Mobile Suit Gundam: Hathaway's Flash, Shin Mazinger Zero VS The Great General of Darkness, The Brave Express Might Gaine, Star Blazers: Space Battleship Yamato 2199, Cross Ange: Rondo of Angel and Dragon.; The V in the title stands for Voyage.
Super Robot Wars X Original release date(s): JP: March 29, 2018; (PS4, PSV): JP: January 10, 2020; (Switch, Steam)	Release years by system: 2018 – PlayStation 4, PlayStation Vita 2020 – Nintendo Switch, Steam
Super Robot Wars X Original release date(s): JP: March 29, 2018; (PS4, PSV): JP: January 10, 2020; (Switch, Steam)	Notes: The third Super Robot Wars game to be released on the PlayStation 4 platform, which focuses more on the "Another World" (Isekai) plot similar to Super Robot Wars EX. The game marks the return of Mobile Suit Gundam F91 into the series proper, Mashin Hero Wataru marks as the second debut of a Red Entertainment created franchise and the debut of a Historical Science Fiction series in the form of Nadia: The Secret of Blue Water. The game also marks the return of the original Mazinkaiser and Hi-ν Gundam, 13 years after its last appearance in 3rd Super Robot Wars Alpha: To the End of the Galaxy and the Banpresto Original mecha Cybuster also appears as a playable character, making it the second non-Original Generation game to feature it since Operation Extend.; Series premiered: Gundam Reconguista in G, Mashin Hero Wataru, Buddy Complex, Buddy Complex Final Chapter: In the Future When We Return to Those Skies, Nadia: The Secret of Blue Water; The X in the title stands for Cross, but also a term for "Unknown" due to the Another World setting.
Super Robot Wars T Original release date(s): JP: March 20, 2019; AS: March 20, 2019	Release years by system: 2019 – PlayStation 4, Nintendo Switch
Super Robot Wars T Original release date(s): JP: March 20, 2019; AS: March 20, 2019	Notes: The fourth Super Robot Wars game to be released on the PlayStation 4 platform and the first title to be released on the Nintendo Switch. The game marks the return of Mobile Fighter G Gundam and Gun Sword into the series proper, Magic Knight Rayearth marks as the second Shōjo anime series in the game after Aikatsu! and Arcadia of My Youth: Endless Orbit SSX marks as the second Space Opera series to debut in the franchise. It also features the original Gespenst, making its debut in a non-OG game.; Series premiered: Expelled from Paradise, Arcadia of My Youth: Endless Orbit SSX, Cowboy Bebop, Magic Knight Rayearth, Getter Robo Daikessen.; The T in the title stands for Terra.
Super Robot Wars 30 Original release date(s): JP: October 28, 2021; AS: October 28, 2021; NA/EU: October 27, 2021; (Steam only)	Release years by system: 2021 – PlayStation 4, Nintendo Switch, Microsoft Windows
Super Robot Wars 30 Original release date(s): JP: October 28, 2021; AS: October 28, 2021; NA/EU: October 27, 2021; (Steam only)	Notes: Released for the series' 30th anniversary, it is the 3rd title to be released on the PC and the first in the main series to get a Western release. The game marks the first time the Mobile Suit Z Gundam storyline uses the A New Translation iteration since the Z trilogy, the Mazinkaiser Inifnitism, a unit based on the High-Grade model kit of the same name debuted in the game and both SSSS.Gridman and Ultraman mark the first time Tsuburaya Productions participated in a SRW game. The game is also the first game to have a non-linear format, implementing the Tactical Area Select system that allows players to pick a stage to progress in. It also introduces an auto-battle feature seen in several mobile games. It is also the first title in the franchise to incorporate additional series via downloadable content.; Series premiered: SSSS.Gridman, The Brave Police J-Decker, King of Kings: Gaogaigar Vs Betterman, Knight's & Magic, Mazinkaiser (Infinitism), Code Geass: Lelouch of the Rebellion III - Glorification, Sakura Wars V: So Long, My Love (DLC 1), ULTRAMAN (DLC 2), Shinkansen Henkei Robo Shinkalion the Movie: The Marvelous Fast ALFA-X That Comes From The Future (Expansion), Getter Robo Devolution: The Last 3 Minutes of the Universe (Expansion), Galactic Armored Fleet Majestic Prince: Awakened Genes (Expansion).; The 30 in the title represents the franchise's 30th anniversary. The logo of the game is designed by Gō Nagai.
Super Robot Wars Y Original release date(s): WW: August 28, 2025	Release years by system: 2025 – PlayStation 5, Nintendo Switch, Microsoft Windows
Super Robot Wars Y Original release date(s): WW: August 28, 2025	Notes: The first title in the franchise developed by Bandai Namco Forge Digitals Inc., following the reorganization and rebranding of B.B Studios and the departure of Takenobu Terada as chief director for the series. It is also the first to be released on Sony's Ninth Generation console and the first game developed using Unity. The series marks the first time a Kamen Rider series debuted in the franchise and the first time a Godzilla series appears outside a mobile spin off.; Series premiered: Mobile Suit Gundam: The Witch from Mercury (Note: Adapts the first season storyline. Second season storyline in Expansion Pass 2), SSSS.Dynazenon, Godzilla Singular Point, Fuuto PI: The Portrait of Kamen Rider Skull (DLC 1), The Brave Fighter of Legend Da-Garn (DLC 2), EUREKA: Eureka Seven Hi-Evolution (Expansion).; The Y in the title stands for Beyond, while the letter is also a reference to the Y Variable.

== Other genres ==
Game	Details
Super Robot Spirits Original release date(s): JP: July 17, 1998	Release years by system: 1998 – Nintendo 64
Super Robot Spirits Original release date(s): JP: July 17, 1998	Notes: A fighting game spin-off for the Nintendo 64, it features a smaller selection of playable mecha, including original characters from other Super Robot Wars games.
Super Robot Wars – Link Battler Original release date(s): JP: October 1, 1999	Release years by system: 1999 – Game Boy Color
Super Robot Wars – Link Battler Original release date(s): JP: October 1, 1999	Notes: Appearing on the Game Boy Color, it is similar to a monster trainer game, such as Pokémon series. Linking to Super Robot Wars 64 with the Nintendo 64's Transfer Pak unlocks exclusive units in each game and allows character experience to be transferred.
Super Robot Wars Scramble Commander Original release date(s): JP: November 6, 2003	Release years by system: 2003 – PlayStation 2
Super Robot Wars Scramble Commander Original release date(s): JP: November 6, 2003	Notes: The first Super Robot Wars to use real-time strategy and features 3D, non-super deformed graphics and the first and to date only Super Robot Wars to feature original antagonist mecha without any original protagonist mecha including an original ghost mechanical beast named Fragment.
Super Robot Wars Scramble Commander the 2nd Original release date(s): JP: November 1, 2007	Release years by system: 2007 – PlayStation 2
Super Robot Wars Scramble Commander the 2nd Original release date(s): JP: November 1, 2007	Notes: The sequel to the original Scramble Commander, it is the first time Mobile Suit Zeta Gundam adopts its movie trilogy's setting. Includes aerial, underwater, and space combat and more than one special attack for several units. With the exceptions of Neon Genesis Evangelion and Mobile Suit Gundam: 08th MS Team the entire cast from the first game returns.: Series premiered: Mobile Suit Gundam SEED Destiny, Shinkon Gattai Godannar!!,Macross Zero.
Super Robot Taisen OG Saga: Endless Frontier Original release date(s): JP: May 29, 2008; NA: April 28, 2009	Release years by system: 2008 – Nintendo DS
Super Robot Taisen OG Saga: Endless Frontier Original release date(s): JP: May 29, 2008; NA: April 28, 2009	Notes: Turn based role-playing game loosely based on the Original Generation games. It is the first game to be co-developed by Monolith Soft and the third SRW game released in the US by Atlus as Super Robot Taisen OG Saga: Endless Frontier.: Series premiered: Xenosaga, Namco × Capcom.
SuperRobo Gakuen Original release date(s): JP: August 27, 2009	Release years by system: 2009 – Nintendo DS
SuperRobo Gakuen Original release date(s): JP: August 27, 2009	Notes: A spin-off in the veins of Super Robot Wars Link Battler and Super Robot Wars XO's online multiplayer mode. This game features roughly the entire cast of Super Robot Wars J, W and K (Gundam SEED, Nadesico, both Tekkaman Blade series and Mazinger Z are excluded, while Getter Robo Armageddon replaces Getter Robo G and manga Shin Getter Robo). The game also features the Compatible Kaiser from Super Robot Wars Original Generation Gaiden.
Super Robot Taisen OG Saga: Endless Frontier Exceed Original release date(s): JP: February 25, 2010	Release years by system: 2010 – Nintendo DS
Super Robot Taisen OG Saga: Endless Frontier Exceed Original release date(s): JP: February 25, 2010	Notes: The sequel to Super Robot Taisen OG Saga: Endless Frontier. New characters include Super Robot Wars A's Axel Almer, Super Robot Wars Impact's Einst Alfimi, SD The Great Battle's Fighter Roar/Azuma Kouta, and Xenosaga's MOMO. The OP movie is done by animation studio XEBEC, while the opening song is sung by Mizuki Nana. The game had three release versions: Regular, Pre-Order and the Limited Edition Box, which contains two soundtrack CDs covering the entire Endless Frontier series and an Artbook.
Super Robot Wars Card Chronicle Original release date(s): JP: September 13, 2012	Release years by system: 2012 – iOS; 2012 – Android
Super Robot Wars Card Chronicle Original release date(s): JP: September 13, 2012	Notes: Released on Japan's Mobage mobile gaming service. It features card-based game play.: Series premiered: Captain Earth
Super Robot Wars OG Infinite Battle Original release date(s): JP: November 28, 2013	Release years by system: 2013 – PlayStation 3
Super Robot Wars OG Infinite Battle Original release date(s): JP: November 28, 2013	Notes: A team-based action game featuring many originals from previous Original Generation titles and features the Exbeins from Super Robot Wars Original Generation: The Inspector.
Super Robot Wars X-Ω Original release date(s): JP: October 4, 2015	Release years by system: 2015 – iOS, Android
Super Robot Wars X-Ω Original release date(s): JP: October 4, 2015	Notes: A Tower-Defense Game done in the same style as Chain Chronicle, it is the first title in the series to be co-developed by Sega. It is notable for having the largest number of series debuting in a Super Robot Wars game (including event exclusives) and also for its one time events, which debuts several series that are devoid of any Mecha and ones that are impossible to be included in a main Super Robot Wars game due to multiple licensing issues. It is also notable for the first time, to include a Kaiju and Tokusatsu series in a Super Robot Wars game, the first time a Red Entertainment created franchise to debut in the game, in the form of Sakura Wars, Muv-Luv Alternative marks the second time an Eroge Visual Novel game appeared, the debut of a Shōjo anime series in the franchise in the form of Aikatsu! and Brave Exkaiser marks as the third Brave series to debut in the franchise. The game also debuted the Getter Noir units, which marks as the second series to feature a game-original unit based on the Getter Robo franchise since T. The game closed its services on March 30, 2021.: Series premiered: Special Armored Battalion Dorvack, Lightspeed Electroid Albegas, Code Geass: OZ the Reflection, Star Driver, Zegapain, Idolmaster: Xenoglossia, Code Geass: Akito the Exiled, Crayon Shin-chan, Armor Hunter Mellowlink, Shin Godzilla, Godzilla Against Mechagodzilla Star Driver: The Movie, Border Break, Galactic Armored Fleet Majestic Prince, The Idolmaster, Sakura Wars, Infinite Ryvius, Eureka Seven AO, Kyōryū Sentai Zyuranger, Getter Robo Go, Gasaraki, The Girl Who Leapt Through Space, Lagrange: The Flower of Rin-ne, Robot Girls Z, Sun Musume ~ Girl's Battle Bootlog~, Hacka Doll, The Idolmaster Cinderella Girls, Heybot!, Sega Hard Girls, Little Witch Academia, Macross Delta, Mega Man, Mazinger Z: Infinity, Fang of the Sun Dougram, A Certain Magical Virtual On, Video Warrior Laserion, Sakura Wars 2: Thou Shalt Not Die, Sakura Wars 3: Is Paris Burning?, Sakura Wars 4: Fall in Love, Maidens, Mazinger Angels, Machine Robo: Runaway Battle Hackers, Gundam Build Fighters, Last Hope, Space Battleship Tiramisu, FLCL, Aikatsu!, Space Sheriff Gavan, Cutie Honey Universe, Muv-Luv Alternative, Brave Exkaiser, Mobile Suit Gundam Narrative, Vandread, Daimidaler: Prince vs Penguin Empire, My-HiME, Galaxy Angel, Medabots 2/Medabots 2 Core, (Note: Uses the Medabots Anime storyline.) Neon Genesis Evangelion: ANIMA, Code Geass: Lelouch of the Re;surrection, SD Sengokuden Musha Shichinin Shuu Hen, SD Command Chronicles, Kaizoku Sentai Gokaiger, Kaizoku Sentai Gokaiger vs. Space Sheriff Gavan: The Movie, Shōnen Ashibe GO! GO! Goma-chan, (Note: Previously revealed as an April Fools joke. The series became a canon entry in the game in the recent NamaSupaRoboTaisen Stream.) Battle Spirits Brave, Shinkansen Henkei Robo Shinkalion THE ANIMATION, Robotics;Notes, s-CRY-ed, Pop Team Epic, Space Battleship Tiramisu Zwei, Gundam Build Fighters: Battlogue, New Sakura Wars, Stellvia, Mobile Suit Gundam 00 Festival 10 "Re:vision", Gunhed, Sei Jūshi Bismark / Saber Rider and the Star Sheriffs, Getter Robo High, Garo, Magical Princess Minky Momo, Bokurano: Ours, Zombie Land Saga, OBSOLETE.; The X-Ω in the title stands for Cross-Omega.
Super Robot Wars DD Original release date(s): JP: August 21, 2019	Release years by system: 2019 – iOS, Android
Super Robot Wars DD Original release date(s): JP: August 21, 2019	Notes: The third mobile title in the franchise, which combines traditional tactical role playing format with mobile gaming elements from previous titles. It is the first game to include multiple storylines spanning multiple worlds based on previous Super Robot Wars titles. It also marks as the first series to include a foreign-made show in the franchise.: Series premiered: Valvrave the Liberator, Mobile Suit Gundam: Iron-Blooded Orphans, Devilman, Zegapain ADP, Aldnoah.Zero, Madö King Granzört, Kikai Sentai Zenkaiger, Pac-Man, Getter Robo Arc, Broken Blade, Dennō Bōkenki Webdiver, Active Raid, Kuromukuro, Brave Bang Bravern!, Full Metal Panic! Invisible Victory, Live A Live, Grendizer U, Brave Universe Sworgrader, Voltes V: Legacy, Mashin Creator Wataru, Mobile Suit Gundam SEED Freedom, The Saint of Braves Baan Gaan, I'm the Evil Lord of an Intergalactic Empire!; The DD in the title stands for Dimension Driver.
