= Super Robot Wars T =

- Nintendo Switch version Box Art.
- Developer: B.B. Studio
- Publisher: Bandai Namco Entertainment
- Producers: Takenobu Terada; Syohei Mogami
- Artists: NishiEda (Characters); Hidetaka Tenjin (Mecha)
- Series: Super Robot Wars
- Platforms: PlayStation 4; Nintendo Switch
- Release: JP: March 20, 2019; Asia: March 20, 2019
- Genre: Tactical role-playing
- Mode: Single-player

Super Robot Wars T (スーパーロボット大戦T, Sūpā Robotto Taisen T) is a tactical role-playing game developed by B.B. Studio and published by Bandai Namco Entertainment. It is the eleventh standalone entry to the Super Robot Wars series and the third installment of the "International Era" series, with the game's continued focus on the massive crossover between different mecha anime series released in Japan. Released for the PlayStation 4 and Nintendo Switch, it was also released in Asia on March 20, 2019.

== Gameplay ==
Super Robot Wars T follows the same basic structure as most other games in the Super Robot Wars franchise: before a stage begins, the character receives introductory dialogue between playable characters which leading to the scenario on the battlefield. To complete a scenario, the player must accomplish certain objectives. Some scenarios are longer, with some having multi-part missions or new objectives added as the story unfolds. On battlefield, the player and enemy take turns to order their units with commands such as moving, attacking, and casting "Spirit Commands", a set of magic-like spells unique to each pilot. Once the scenario is cleared, more dialogue is exchanged between characters before the player is taken to an intermission menu. Here, units can be upgraded or optional parts installed, characters' stats and skills can be changed or upgraded, and other maintenance actions can be performed before the continuing on with the game.

Gameplay elements from previous games return, including the Skill Route and Skill Program function introduced in Super Robot Wars V, as well as the Tac Management system and Hard Mode settings as they appeared in Super Robot Wars X. New elements in the game is included in the form of the Support Command, which grants special commands through Supporters. Supporter Spirits Points, needed to use Supporter Commands, are shared between all Supporters characters. The game also uses the sub-order system, first introduced in 2nd Super Robot Wars Z.

Like the previous games, Super Robot Wars T has paid downloadable content in the form of extra missions and items.

== Characters ==
=== VTX Union ===
Saizo Tokitou (サイゾウ・トキトウ, Saizō Tokitou)
Voiced by: Takeshi Kusao

One of the game's main protagonists, he is the leader of the VTX Union's secret service's third division. Though he is a proud Salaryman, he is very proud of his job and has zero priorities on everything else. He also can be arrogant, laid back but wild at times. He is one of the pilots of the "Tyranado" (ティラネード, Tiranēdo), the company's flagship mecha which focuses on long-ranged combat. If Sagiri is chosen as the main character, he ends up piloting the Gespenst.

Takeshi Kusao stated that he's a fan of the Super Robot Wars games since 1991, and his acting "reflects how Saizou has a lot of life experience and tries to show off to younguns." He also compared Saizou to Crowe Burst from 2nd Super Robot Wars Z, yet both being different in many ways.

Sagiri Sakurai (サギリ・サクライ, Sagiri Sakurai)
Voiced by: Umeka Shouji

One of the game's main protagonists, she is also a member of VTX Union secret service's third division, serving as Saizo's superior. A formidable pilot in the battlefield, though beautiful, she has a very crude personality and has a drive to push herself to the limits just for the money. Like Saizo, she is also one of the pilots of the Tyranado. If Saizo is chosen as the main character, she ends up piloting the Gespenst.

Ramie Amasaki (ラミィ・アマサキ, Ramyi Amasaki)
Voiced by: Ai Kakuma

== Development ==
The game was first announced during the "Nama SupaRobo Channel" livestream on November 19, 2018 alongside the upcoming mobile title Super Robot Wars DD. Like the previous two installments focusing on the crossover aspect, the game itself is themed around "Revenge" and similar to both titles, aimed more for newcomers of the series. In the title of the series, the "T" stands for "Terra". The game also marks its first ever release on the Nintendo Switch, following the decline of the PlayStation Vita.

Like Super Robot Wars X, it only has few new entries to the game as well as returning entries to the series. Mobile Fighter G Gundam and Gun Sword both return in the franchise after their last respective game debuts while Mazinger Z: Infinity properly debuted in the game after its one-time event debut in Super Robot Wars X-Ω. For the debuting series, Magic Knight Rayearth becomes the second Shōjo anime series after Aikatsu! to debut in the series while Arcadia of My Youth: Endless Orbit SSX marks as the second Space Opera series to debut in the franchise. Similar to V and X, the game features a guest mecha unit in the form of the "Gespenst" from 4th Super Robot Wars, making it the fifth time the unit is introduced outside its debut game since Super Robot Wars Original Generations.

== Series included ==
- Banpresto Originals

- Super Robot Wars Gaiden: Masō Kishin – The Lord Of Elemental
- 4th Super Robot Wars^{b}^{c}
- Super Robot Wars V
- Super Robot Wars X

- Invincible Robo Trider G7
- Mobile Suit Zeta Gundam
- Mobile Suit Gundam ZZ
- Mobile Suit Gundam: Char's Counterattack

- Mobile Suit Gundam: Char's Counterattack – Beltorchika’s Children^{c}

- Mobile Suit Crossbone Gundam

- Mobile Suit Crossbone Gundam: Skull Heart^{c}
- Mobile Suit Crossbone Gundam: The Steel 7^{c}

- Mobile Fighter G Gundam
- The Brave Express Might Gaine
- King of Braves GaoGaiGar
- Gunbuster
- Martian Successor Nadesico: The Motion Picture – Prince of Darkness
- Getter Robo Armageddon

- Getter Robo Daikessen^{a}^{c}

- Mazinger Z: Infinity
- Aura Battler Dunbine

- New Story of Aura Battler Dunbine

- Armored Trooper Votoms

- Armored Trooper Votoms: The Last Red Shoulder^{c}
- Armored Trooper Votoms: Big Battle^{c}

- Gun X Sword
- Expelled from Paradise^{a}
- Cowboy Bebop^{a}
- Arcadia of My Youth: Endless Orbit SSX^{a}
- Magic Knight Rayearth^{a}

Notes
^a Debuting series.
^b Downloadable Content.
^c Mecha only.

== Music ==
The game's opening and ending themes are performed by Anison group JAM Project, with the single "Tread on the Tiger's Tail / RESET" officially released on April 24, 2019.

== Release ==
The game was released on both the PlayStation 4 and the Nintendo Switch in Japan and Asian territories on March 20, 2019. Pre-orders of both versions of the game included a special downloadable code for two special scenarios and a guest unit, the Gespenst. Also, similar to V and X, a Premium Anime Song & Sound Edition was released on the same date.

On May 24, a new difficulty mode called "Super Expert Mode" was added to the game, which increased enemy unit customization levels even further and disallows retrying the stage when trying to achieve SR points. It also allowed further upgrades for the player's units and pilots, such as an additional Ace rank, new skill levels, an increased cap on pilot levels and stats, and an increased cap on unit upgrade ranks.

== Reception ==
Famitsu gave Super Robot Wars T an 8 out of 10, noting that while there was little in the way of new gameplay systems and mechanics, the streamlining of certain customization options, such as pilot skill acquisition, came as a welcome change. They also praised the new Supporter system, which, while "simple", allowed non-combat characters from included to participate in battles. They also praised the quality of the new battle animations and the uniqueness of the lineup that the new series brought, such as Magic Knight Rayearth and Cowboy Bebop.

Destructoid praised the game for its appeal to newcomers; they called its roster "excellent" with "broad appeal", and said it had the best story in the translated trio. Other strong points were most of the new sprites and animations, as well as the new Supporter system. However, they thought the game "stumbles appealing to fans of previous games", noting that asset reuse, while ordinary for the Super Robot Wars series, has led to inconsistent animation quality even within a single unit's attacks. They also were unhappy with issues with game balance, particularly with regards to Expert mode, which functionally makes certain bonus objectives easier to meet.
