= Ako Mayama =

Japanese voice actress (born 1958)

- 真山 亜子
- Born: Yasuyo Kawando (川人 康代); November 15, 1958 (age 67); Toki, Gifu, Japan
- Occupations: Actor; voice actor
- Years active: 1980–present
- Agent: Kenyu Office

Ako Mayama (真山 亜子, Mayama Ako; born November 15, 1958), previously known as Rin Mizuhara (水原 リン, Mizuhara Rin), is a Japanese voice actress.

She is known for portraying young boys or scruffy old ladies.

She is best known for voicing Satoshi Sugiyama, also known as Sugiyama-kun, in the Chibi Maruko-chan television anime series.

== Biography ==
Ako Mayama is a native of Gifu prefecture and a graduate of Toyo University.

== Filmography ==
=== Television animation ===
- Mama wa Shougaku 4 Nensei (1992) as Obaasan
- Hime-chan no Ribbon (1992) as Hibino Hikaru
- Yu Yu Hakusho (1992) as Miyuki
- Nintama Rantarou (1993) as additional roles
- Red Baron (1994) as Robby (eps 5-17, 23-49)
- Case Closed (1996) as additional roles
- Cowboy Bebop (1998) as Pet Shop Owner
- One Piece (1999) as Miss Doublefinger (eps 103-104), Kokoro, Nyon
- Onegai My Melody: Sukkiri (2007) as Miss Mawari
- Mononoke (2007) as Ochou's Mother
- Tetsuwan Birdy Decode (2008) as Iruma
- Fairy Tail (2009) as Ooba Babasaama and Ooya-san
- The Tatami Galaxy (2010) as The Fortune Teller
- Yo-kai Watch Shadowside (2018) as Mitsue Arihoshi (old)
- Chibi Maruko Chan (1990) as Satoshi Sugiyama (Sugiyama-kun)
- Let's Make a Mug Too (2021) as Sachie Tokikawa
- Ranma ½ (2024) as Cologne
- Sazae-san (2025) as Ura no oobachan and Hashimoto
- Daemons of the Shadow Realm (2026) as Long Arms

=== Theatrical animation ===
- Yo-kai Watch Shadowside: Oni-ō no Fukkatsu (2017) as Mitsue Arihoshi

=== Original video animation (OVA) ===
- Cyber City Oedo 808 (1990) as Kelly
- Submarine 707R (2003) as Ardemis
- One Punch Man: Road to Hero (2015) as Landlady

=== Original net animation (ONA) ===
- The Way of the Househusband (2021) as Elizabeth

=== Video games ===
- Super Robot Wars: Original Generations (2007) as Aguilla Sterne
- Super Robot Wars V (2017) as Black Noir
- Super Robot Wars X (2018) as Black Noir
- Super Robot Wars T (2019) as Black Noir
- Final Fantasy VII Remake (2020) as Mireille
- Honkai Star Rail (2025) as Caenis

=== Dubbing roles ===
==== Live-action ====
- Billy Madison (Juanita)
- The Birthday Cake (Sofia (Lorraine Bracco))
- ER (Nurse Haleh Adams (Yvette Freeman))
- E.T. the Extra-Terrestrial (E.T.)
- Ghostbusters (Gozer)
- Ghostbusters: Afterlife (Roller Granny)
- The Lord of the Rings: The Fellowship of the Ring (Lobelia Sackville-Baggins)
- Minari (Soon-ja (Youn Yuh-jung))
- Rita Moreno: Just a Girl Who Decided to Go for It (Whoopi Goldberg)
- Spaceballs (Dot Matrix)

==== Animation ====
- 101 Dalmatians: The Series (Mooch and Princess)
- Adventure Time (Cake the Cat)
- Charlotte's Web (The Goose)
- Cinderella II: Dreams Come True (Beatrice)
- Disney's House of Mouse (Clarabelle Cow)
- Happy Feet (Mrs. Astrakhan)
- Incredibles 2 (Honey Best)
- Jimmy Neutron: Boy Genius (Sheen Estevez)
- Spider-Man: The Animated Series (Madame Web)
- SWAT Kats: The Radical Squadron (Molly Mange)
