= The Brave Express Might Gaine =

Japanese anime television series

- 勇者特急マイトガイン
- Genre: Mecha; Science Fiction; Romance; Action
- Created by: Hajime Yatate
- Developed by: Takao Koyama
- Directed by: Tesaki Okuno
- Music by: Takashi Kudō
- Country of origin: Japan
- Original language: Japanese
- No. of episodes: 47

Production
- Producers: Shin Imai (Nagoya TV); Hitoshi Kako (Nagoya TV); Mami Ohara (Tokyu Agency); Fumikuni Kozawa (Sunrise); Takayuki Yoshii (Sunrise)
- Production companies: Nagoya TV; Tokyu Agency; Sunrise

Original release
- Network: ANN (Nagoya TV, TV Asahi)
- Release: January 30, 1993 – January 22, 1994

The Brave Express Might Gaine (Japanese: 勇者特急マイトガイン, Hepburn: Yūsha Tokkyū Maitogain) is a robot anime television series which premiered in Japan in 1993, created by Sunrise under the direction of Shinji Takamatsu, and was the fourth installment of the Brave series.

== Story ==
In the year 1950 the world's supply of oil ran out, forcing humanity to adopt locomotives as their primary transports instead of automobiles. In 2049, billionaire and crime-fighting teenager Maito Senpuuji takes up his father's company and assets at the age of only 15. Taking control of the Brave Express team of robots that his late father created, Senpuuji and his free thinking robot team takes on the crime lords that plague Nouvelle Tokyo City, formerly Tokyo Bay.

== Characters ==
=== Heroes ===
Maito Senpuuji (旋風寺舞人, Senpūji Maito)
Voiced by Nobuyuki Hiyama
A 15-year-old billionaire who is the president of Senpuuji Enterprise and the commander of the Brave Express team (勇者特急隊, Yūsha Tokkyū Tai). He pilots the Might Wing, Might Kaiser, and both Might Gaine and Great Might Gaine both with the assistance of Gaine. Whenever villains cause trouble, he is the one who stops their plans. His parents were killed three years ago in a serious bullet train accident.
Sally Yoshinaga (吉永サリー, Yoshinaga Sarī)
Voiced by Akiko Yajima
The main heroine, a high school student who tends to get involved in the crimes committed by the villains with no reason, but Mighto always comes to rescue her. They get to know each other because of that. She becomes the girlfriend of Maito during the course of the series. Her little brother, Tetsuya, idolizes Might Gaine. Her father is severely ill, so she must take up part-time jobs to sustain the family. At the end of the series, Sally and Mighto eventually get married.
Mitsuhiko Hamada (浜田満彦, Hamada Mitsuhiko)
Voiced by Masami Kikuchi
A friend of Maito and a mechanic, he is the one who helped to reinvent the Bombers.
Aoki Keiichiro (青木桂一郎, Keiichiro Aoki)
Voiced by Kazuhiko Kishino
Maito's butler and father figure throughout the series.
Izumi Matsubara (松原いずみ, Matsubara Izumi)
Voiced by Yuri Amano
Maito's secretary and older sister figure throughout the series.
Yuujiro Senpuuji (旋風寺裕次郎, Senpūji Yūjirō)
Voiced by Ritsuo Sawa
Maito's crochety and eccentric grandfather. He is the founder of Senpuuji Enterprise.
Jirou Osaka (大阪次郎, Ōsaka Jirō)
Voiced by Naoki Makishima
The director of Senpuuji Engineering Aoidou Depot and the technical director of the Brave Express team.
Shouichirou Ozawa (小沢昭一郎, Ozawa Shōichirō)
Voiced by Hirohiko Kakegawa
The police officer in Nouvelle Tokyo City. He supports the actions of the Brave Express team.

=== Villains ===
Wolfgang (ウォルフガング, Worufugangu)
Voiced by Masaharu Satō
A German professor of robot technology, he holds the ambition that makes the strongest robot in the world. Hiryu and Goryu were constructed by him. He also fabricated the Innocent Wave amplifier to help Maito to defeat Black Noir.
Hoi Kow Lou (ホイ・コウ・ロウ, Hoi Kō Rō)
Voiced by Yū Shimaka
A don of the Asian Mafia from China, Lou is easily recognizable due to his large, bump-covered nose and a loud green bird perched on his shoulder. He sells various robots to the highest bidder in order to commit crimes. After losing control over the Mafia due to Purple's intervention, he ends up selling ramen.
Catherine Vuitton (カトリーヌ・ヴィトン, Katorīnu Viton)
Voiced by Shōko Kanoki (Anime), Yuriko Fuchizaki (Super Robot Wars V)
A French woman, a boss of "Pink Cat" the confederacy of thieves. To keep her beauty, she often steals the jewel and the adornment for her desire.
Shogun Mifune (ショーグン・ミフネ, Shōgun Mifune)
Voiced by Kiyoyuki Yanada
An American who is dressed in Samurai style. He plots to reconquer all of Japan, to regain an old-fashioned, traditional Japanese culture.
Joe Rival (雷張 ジョー, Raibaru Jō)
Voiced by Hikaru Midorikawa
The rival of Maito, also well known as "Joe the Ace". He used to be an ace pilot in the army. Wolfgang gives him Hiryu (飛龍, Hiryū; Flying Dragon) and Goryu (轟龍, Gōryū; Mighty Dragon) in order to defeat Might Gaine. Later in the series, He discovered Exeve is the person responsible for his father's death, then he turned against him. In the finale, he piloted Gouryu to kill Exeve using the drill to avenge his father.
Exev (エグゼブ, Eguzebu)
Voiced by Masashi Sugawara
The president of Treasure Robotics Corporation, he was a politician before being brainwashed by Black Noir. He was responsible for the deaths of Maito's parents and Joe's father. In the finale, he was finally killed by Joe using Gouryu's drill.
Purple (パープル, Pāpuru)
Voiced by Katsumi Suzuki
A rock star who works for Black Noir. He setup a trap to take over Hoi Kow Lou's mafia. He was killed by Great Might Gaine using Perfect Cannon in the second last episode.
Black Noir (ブラックノワール, Burakkunowāru)
Voiced by Rin Mizuhara
The final boss, appears throughout the series starting in episode 41. Powers include baptizing machines in a dark light that causes them to mutate, emitting red energy bolts, a giant floating fortress with regenerative properties, and wind-like shockwave. It's eventually revealed that she was the great threat that made Maito's father create the Brave Express team, and the one who brainwashed Exeve and Purple. She appears as an energy being inside a giant chamber. However, her aura can be eliminated by a powerful Innocent Wave. Before the finale, her aura was eliminated twice by Sally's powerful Innocent Wave, allowing Great Might Gaine to defeat her mutant robot army. Wolfgang is the first person to discover her weakness, and thus to fabricate the Innocent Wave amplifier. He also requested his subordinate to send the amplifier to Maito. During the final battle, she reveals that she is an entity from the third dimension, and that Maito's world is the second dimension. This is all part of a game that was created by a certain person for her to play. She refers everyone in Maito's world as "pawns" and calls Maito "a pawn that was given a role of a Hero." She is defeated when Sally, who can generate a powerful Innocent Wave and also incredibly amplified, eliminates her aura to allow Might Gaine to finish her off with a double Dou-Rin-Ken attack. Before she dies, she realizes that she was also a pawn in this game to act as the final boss in this world, ironically.

== Mechanics ==
=== Brave Express Team ===
==== Might Gaine Team ====
- Great Might Gaine Perfect Mode (グレートマイトガイン・パーフェクトモード, Gurēto Maito Gain Pāfekuto Mōdo) (Voiced by Daiki Nakamura) – Great Might Gaine's final form with Might Gunner forming a shoulder-mounted Perfect Cannon. The Perfect Cannon is an immensely powerful weapon, but has a drawback of significantly reducing the mobility.
  - Great Might Gaine (グレートマイトガイン, Gurēto Maito Gain) (Voiced by Daiki Nakamura) – The Great Combiner of the series, the combination of both Might Gaine and Might Kaiser.
    - Might Gaine (マイトガイン, Maito Gain) (Voiced by Daiki Nakamura) – The combined robot of Gaine, Might Wing and Locomorizer. This is the series' main mecha.
      - Gaine (ガイン, Gain) (Voiced by Daiki Nakamura) – A super artificially intelligent robot with the ability to transform into a train (Shinkansen 300 Series). Gaine becomes the left arm of Might Gaine when combined with the Might Wing and the Locomorizer. When Maito pilots Might Kaiser, Gaine's AI takes control of Might Gaine.
      - Might Wing (マイトウィング, Maito Wingu) – Maito's personal train (Shinkansen 400 Series), it also has a jet mode. The Might Wing becomes the right arm of Might Gaine when combined with Gaine and the Locomorizer.
      - Locomorizer (ロコモライザー, Rokomoraizā) – A giant Breitspurbahn steam locomotive. It becomes the core component of Might Gaine, forming the torso, the legs and the head when combined with the Might Wing and Gaine. It can also expand its rear section to carry the train modes of Gaine and the Might Wing.
    - Might Kaiser/Kaiser Jet (マイトカイザー / カイザージェット, Maito Kaizā / Kaizā Jetto) – Two alternate combinations (robot mode or jet mode) of the Kaiser Machines 1–5, the Kaiser Drill and the Kaiser Carrier, piloted by Maito. It forms the body additions of Great Might Gaine. This is the series' secondary main mecha.
      - Drill Express (ドリル特急, Doriru Tokkyū; Drill Express) – This is the combined train form of the Kaiser Drill and Kaiser Carrier.
        - Kaiser Drill (カイザードリル, Kaizā Doriru) – A drill locomotive that pulls the Kaiser Carrier, piloted by Maito. When forming Might Kaiser with the Kaiser Machines, it forms the torso, the head and the thighs.
        - Kaiser Carrier (カイザーキャリア, Kaizā Kyaria) – A railroad car that carries the Kaiser Machines. It is pulled by Kaiser Drill. Kaiser Carrier also holds the wings and chest emblem of Might Kaiser.
      - Kaiser Machines (カイザーマシン, Kaizā Mashin) – Numbered 1 to 5, initially stored in the Kaiser Carrier. Kaiser 1 is a very light jet that becomes the breastplate of Might Kaiser. Kaiser 2 is a drill vehicle that becomes the right arm of Might Kaiser. Kaiser 3 is a mobile crane that becomes the left arm of Might Kaiser. Kaiser 4 is a deep-sea exploration vehicle that becomes the right leg of Might Kaiser. Kaiser 5 is a bulldozer that becomes the left leg of Might Kaiser.
  - Might Gunner/Bullet Express/Perfect Cannon (マイトガンナー / 弾丸特急 / パーフェクトキャノン, Maito Gannā / Dangan Tokkyū / Pāfekuto Kyanon) (Voiced by Katsumi Suzuki) – A robot that can transform into a steam locomotive (as the Bullet Express) or a cannon (as the Perfect Cannon). The cannon component is Might Gunner's chest when in robot mode. He becomes a shoulder-mounted cannon for Great Might Gaine Perfect Mode.

==== Bombers (ボンバーズ, Bonbāzu) ====
The Bombers are a group of artificially intelligent robots, each capable of transforming into a robot, a train and an animal they are designed after, and an alternate armored version of a train. The first three or all four of the Bombers, in their armored train forms, are known as the Animal Express (アニマル特急, Animaru Tokkyū) when linked together. The typical order is Lio Bomber > Dino Bomber > Bird Bomber (> Horn Bomber).

- Battle Bomber (バトルボンバー, Batoru Bonbā) (Voiced by Naoki Makishima) – Super robot formed by all the Bombers, the powered-up form of Tribomber. It has a lion head extending from a neck as an ornament on its chest.
  - Tribomber (トライボンバー, Toraibonbā) (Voiced by Naoki Makishima) – Super robot formed by Lio Bomber, Bird Bomber and Dino Bomber. It has a Shinkansen 200 Series train head as the chest.
    - Lio Bomber (ライオボンバー, Raio Bonbā) (Voiced by Naoki Makishima) – The leader of the Bombers. He can transform into a robot, a train (Shinkansen 200 Series Type 2000) and a lion. When forming Tribomber or Battle Bomber, Lio Bomber becomes the torso and the head.
    - Dino Bomber (ダイノボンバー, Daino Bonbā) (Voiced by Hirohiko Kakegawa) – He can transform into a robot, a train (651 series) and a dinosaur. When forming Tribomber or Battle Bomber, Dino Bomber becomes the right side of the combination, forming the arm, the waist and the leg.
    - Bird Bomber (バードボンバー, Bādo Bonbā) (Voiced by Masami Kikuchi) – He can transform into a robot, a train (253 series) and a bird. When forming Tribomber or Battle Bomber, Bird Bomber becomes the left side of the combination, forming the arm, the waist and the leg.
  - Horn Bomber (ホーンボンバー, Hōn Bonbā) (Voiced by Naoki Makishima) – He can transform into a robot, a train (Shinkansen 100 Series) and a Triceratops. When forming Battle Bomber, Horn Bomber becomes the head, breastplate, a shoulder cannon and wings.

==== Divers (ダイバーズ, Daibāzu) ====
The Divers are a group of artificially intelligent robots designed for rescue purposes.

- Guard Diver/Rescue Express (ガードダイバー / レスキュー特急, Gādo Daibā / Resukyū Tokkyū) (Voiced by Ryōtarō Okiayu) – Two combinations formed by the four Divers. Guard Diver is a super robot, and the Rescue Express is a combined high-speed train (SNCF TGV Sud-Est).
  - Fire Diver (ファイアダイバー, Faia Daibā) (Voiced by Ryōtarō Okiayu) – The leader of the Divers. He can transform into a fire engine. When combined with the other Divers to form Guard Diver, Fire Diver forms the arms, upper torso and head.
  - Police Diver (ポリスダイバー, Porisu Daibā) (Voiced by Naoki Makishima) – He can transform into a police car (Lotus Esprit Mk4). When combined with the other Divers to form Guard Diver, Police Diver forms the lower torso, the waist and the upper legs.
  - Jet Diver (ジェットダイバー, Jetto Daibā) (Voiced by Masami Kikuchi) – He can transform into a jet (McDonnell Douglas F/A-18 Hornet). When combined with the other Divers to form Guard Diver, Jet Diver forms the left lower leg.
  - Drill Diver (ドリルダイバー, Doriru Daibā) (Voiced by Hirohiko Kakegawa) – He can transform into a drill tank. When combined with the other Divers to form Guard Diver, Drill Diver forms the right lower leg.

==== Brave Express Five-Unit Connection (勇者特急五体連結, Yūsha Tokkyū Gotai Renketsu) ====
The entire team can link into a single train. The order of the Brave Express is Drill Express (carrying Kaisers 1–5) > Locomorizer (carrying Gaine and Might Wing) > Bullet Express > Animal Express (all four) > Rescue Express. At full speed, the trains can perform the Joint Dragon Fire attack, which engulfs the whole train in fire while rushing at full speed.

==== Great Train Fortress (大列車フォートレス, Dai Ressha Fōtoresu) ====
The fortification of the Brave Express Team, it stores Locomorizer, Animal Express, Rescue Express and Drill Express.

=== Joe Rival ===
- Hiryu: Constructed by Wolfgang, appears in episodes 11, 13, 14, 23, and 24. The design was originally from Transformers Zone's Sonic Bomber. Powers include a super sonic jet mode armed with a powerful laser cannon and wing missiles, flight, a spear with a pair of ax blades near the tip, martial arts skills, an energy gun that rivals the Moving Wheel Sword called the Hiryu Blazer, and five missiles in each leg. It once defeated Tribomber and Might Gaine, but was finally destroyed by Might Kaiser. Reappears in both Brave Saga games.
- Goryu: Also constructed by Wolfgang, appears throughout the series starting in episode 26. The design was originally from Transformers Zone's Dai Atlas. It has the same combat power of Great Might Gaine. Powers include flight, speed, rocket punches attacked to chains and each armed with several gatling guns, transforming into a jet armed with a drill missile at the nose, an energy rifle stored in the right leg called the Goryu Cannon, a vulcan gun on each side of its head, and four missile pods in its torso. It can also transform into a base. Reappears in both Brave Saga games.

=== Hoi Kow Lou ===
- Black Might Gaine (Voiced by Yasunori Matsumoto): Appears in episode 16. Controlled jointly by Hoi and Chinja. The cockpit being inserted into Black Might Gaine's head is a homage to Mazinger Z when the Hover Pilder combines into Mazinger Z's head.
  - Black Gaine (Voiced by Yasunori Matsumoto): Appears in episode 16. An attempt to make an evil clone of Gaine, but Hoi Kow Loon accidentally copied the heart of justice from Gaine.
  - Black Might Wing: Appears in episode 16. Operated by Chinja.
  - Black Locomorizer: Appears in episode 16.
  - Black Pilder: Appears in episode 16. Its purpose was to control Black Gaine through a control mask.

=== Other Criminal Mecha ===
The various mecha that have been used by the villains to fight against Might Gaine and the other members of the Brave Express Team throughout the series.

- Ether 5656: Appears in episode 1. Powers include a plug in the right arm that absorbs electricity, a mouth flamethrower, and torso missile pods.
- Paozuu: Appear in episode 2. Powers include assimilating with metals to grow and regenerate, foot wheels, and a pair of machine guns in the mouth of the front head.
- Kengo: Appears in episode 3. Powers include a katana and flight.
- Hamoloon: Appears in episode 4. Powers include a nose drill, treads, spiked fingers, and iron mice in the torso.
- Churenpai: Appear in episode 5. Powers include foot treads, a right shoulder missile cannon, a machine gun, and a knife in the right arm. They heavily resemble armored troopers from Armored Trooper VOTOMS.
- Probebot: Appears in episode 6. Powers include a flamethrower for the left arm and a missile pod in each shoulder.
- Trainingbot: Appear in episode 6. Its only known power is a pistol.
- Panzer CR-17: Appears in episode 6. Powers include projectile resistant armor and a pistol.
- Yakko: Appears in episode 7. Powers include levitation, an underside eye-like heat cannon, an electric field, two projectile resistant capture cables, and a robot form.
- Fromage: Appears is episode 8. Powers include spiked claws, a spiked wrecking ball in the torso called the Special Diamond Attack, and heat lasers from the anteater-like mouth.
- Train Bomb: Appears in episode 9. Powers include train hijacking, exploding if it goes below 45 kilometers an hour, homing rocket turrets, and a robotic upper half disguised as Ma-Bo-Jyan's blimp armed with propellers for arms.
- Ninja: Appears in episode 10. Powers include a launchable chain for the right hand armed with missile pods, a sickle and spear for the left hand, a flamethrower in the "mouth", and agility.
- Mega Sonic 8823: Appears in episode 11. Powers include flight, a 4-tube missile launcher on each shoulder, three homing rockets on each hip plate, and a radiation gun on the right arm. Also based on Sonic Bomber.
- Mylenes: Appear in episodes 12 and 36. Powers include flight, a pair of machine guns on the head, a vacuum used to steal jewelry, sonic waves from the end of the abdomen, tracking missiles, reformation, and combining into Milenian.
- Milenian: Appears in episode 12. Powers include sonic waves from the top of the thorax and flight.
- Assassinbot: Appears in episode 13. Its only known power is a machine gun on each pectoral.
- Death Fire: Appears in episode 13. Its only known power is a large Winchester rifle.
- Chivalry Robot: Appears in episode 14. Powers include foot treads and a katana.
- Gang Robot: Appears in episode 14. Powers include foot treads and a tommy gun.
- Karate: Appears in episode 15. Powers include karate skills and projectile resistance.
- Gunger: Appears in episode 16. Powers include a 5-tube missile launcher on each shoulder, a pair of machine guns for the right arm, a torso flamethrower, and spider-like robotic probes.
- Mars 1133: Appears in episode 17. Powers include a 4-barreled gatling in each pectoral and claw hands.
- Stark 4126: Appears in episode 17. Powers include a 3-tube missile launcher in the torso, clamp hands, a red energy cannon in the forehead, levitation, and foot spikes for walking at various angles.
- Kruta: Appears in episode 18. Powers include a chainsaw arm, a pair of shovel claw arms, a claw crane arm, a drill arm, an underside drill, bombs, a machine gun, four red electric tentacle arms, a rocket launcher, a pair of lightning bolt rods, four cannons, and a chained mace.
- Octopussy: Appears in episode 18. Powers include flight, six extensible tentacles with regenerative properties, and six energy cannons in the head.
- Ashura: Appears in episode 19. Powers include a helicopter mode, six launchable arms, three flamethrowers and yellow lasers in its rotating head, levitation, and a resistance to heat.
- Cool Mint 3636 Sentry 1: Appears in episode 21. Its only known power is having five missile launchers in the torso.
- Cool Mint 3636 Sentry 2: Appears in episode 21. Its only known power is having a 3-tube missile pod in each side of its torso.
- Cool Mint 3636: Appears in episode 21. Powers include a truck form, a pair of machine guns in each wrist, a gunk gun ob the torso that jams electronic signals, a night vision system, and a tomahawk stored on the back.
- Red Shaomai: Appears in episode 22. Powers include an automatic rifle and a Chinese sword.
- Blue Shaomai: Appears in episode 22. Powers include an automatic rifle and a Chinese sword.
- Krappe 4545: Appears in episode 23. Powers include a pair of crab claws and a pair of cannons on the head.
- Lenglen Issue: Appear in episode 25. Powers include burrowing, seven machine guns in the torso, and combining into a brick-like dragon with eye electric bolts and burrowing.
- Lingling Issue: Appear in episode 25. Powers include an electrical cannon and combining into a robot armed with a red energy cannon on each shoulder.
- Dark Wind Robo: Appears in episode 26. Powers include a ninjato, high jumping, shurikens, and interference resistance.
- Magic Wind Robo: Appears in episode 26. Powers include cutting wires from the fingers, high jumping, and interference resistance.
- Mystic Wind Robo: Appears in episode 26. Powers include a club, melee resistant armor, a saucer-like buzzsaw mode, and interference resistance.
- Nio: Appears in episode 28. Powers include a spear, twin white electric cloths from its helmet, and a 6-tube missile pod in the torso.
- Sunobi: Appears in episode 29. Powers include swimming, converting sea water into ice blocks, flight, emitting heat waves by absorbing solar energy, three vulcan guns on each side of its head, ice bombs from the beak, and a green laser gun in each wing.
- Guyaton: Appears in episode 30. Powers include disguising itself as a blimp, a green energy cannon on each hip each armed with pincer claw half, and a large pincer claw on the head armed with pink electric bolts.
- Telecaster: Appears in episode 31. Powers include a tomahawk, a pair of energy guns in the torso with four hidden in the abdomen, and an electric wire in the left wrist.
- Stratocaster: Appears in episode 31. Powers include a pair of energy guns in the torso, an electric wire in the left wrist, a pair of curved swords on the forearms, and missile launchers in the shoulders.
- Doraitsuen 1313: Appears in episode 32. Powers include a pair of missile launchers in each shoulder, flight, five tentacles from the right arm that emit pink electricity, and a missile pod in each hip and knee.
- Arson: Appears in episode 33. Powers include levitation, a magnet in the underside, nose missiles, and a mouth drill.
- Rickenbacker: Appear in episode 34. Powers include helicopter blades in the head, a shield on the right shoulder, a machine gun for the left hand, and shoulder rocket launchers.
- Pumpkin: Appears in episode 36. Powers include flight, emitting seeds of giant pumpkin plants armed with destructive vines, a long bladed scythe, yellow eye beams, and finger machine guns. Reappears in Brave Saga.
- Kochou: Appears in episode 37. Powers include flight, hurricane-force winds from the wings, and emitting explosive golden powder.
- Hannya: Appears in episode 37. Powers include invisibility, levitation, red energy balls from the eyes on the torso skull, a katana, four capture cables in each wrist, and a flamethrower in the torso skull mouth.
- Shogun: Appears in episode 38. Powers include burrowing and a pair of katanas stored on the back. Reappears in Brave Saga.
- Margarita: Appears in episode 39. Powers include speed and boar tusks.
- Pression: Appears in episode 40. Powers include fast swimming and a high pressure hose in the tail and mouth.
- Atlas Mark II: Appear in episode 41. Powers include morphing into a jet, a beam glaive, a pair of beam tomahawks, and a beam sword. They appear in Brave Saga. The design was originally from Dai Atlas from Transformers Zone.
- Raigo: Appears in episode 42. Powers include flight and powering Raijin and Jinrai's interference.
- Raijin: Appears in episode 42. Powers include flight, kung fu skills, emitting an interference signal, an electric tentacle in the right wrist, nunchucks, and sais.
- Jinrai: Appears in episode 42. Powers include flight, kung fu skills, emitting an interference signal, an electric tentacle in the right wrist, and a trident.

=== Black Noir's Forces ===
- Z: Appear in episodes 43, 45, and 46. Powers include a forehead beam, flight, regeneration, a broadsword the fires blue energy beams, a high resistance to energy based attacks, and a red energy field.
- Y: Appear in episodes 44, 45, 46, and 47. Powers include flight, an energy rifle, and regeneration..
- X: Appear in episodes 44, 45, and 46. Powers include an assault rifle, a red energy field, and regeneration.
- Blanca: Appears in episodes 45 and 46. Powers include flight and a force field.
- Imperial: Appears in episode 47. Powers include a highly explosive red torso beam that is stronger than the Perfect Cannon, flight, an electrical field, a high resistance to energy attacks, a broadsword, and pink energy blasts from the mouth. Reappears in Brave Saga.

== Episodes ==
No.	Title	Directed by	Written by	Original release date
1	"That's the Rumored Might Gaine" "Are ga Usawa Maitogain" (あれが噂のマイトガイン)	Directed by : Naoki Hishikawa; Storyboarded by : Tesaki Okuno	Takao Koyama	January 30, 1993
2	"Roar and Take Off! Bombers" "Hoete Hasshin! Bonbāzu" (吠えて発進! ボンバーズ)	Directed by : Yasuhiro Minami; Storyboarded by : Tesaki Okuno	Takao Koyama	February 6, 1993
3	"This Guy is Strong! Swordsman Robo" "Koitsu wa Tsuyoi! Kengō Robo" (こいつは強い! 剣豪ロボ)	Hiroshi Ishiodori	Takao Koyama	February 13, 1993
4	"Emergency Dispatch! Divers" "Kinkyū Shutsudō! Daibāzu" (緊急出動! ダイバーズ)	Directed by : Osamu Sekita; Storyboarded by : Kazuhito Kikuchi	Takao Koyama	February 20, 1993
5	"Protect the President!" "Daitōryō o Mamori Nuke!" (大統領を守りぬけ!)	Directed by : Yasuhiro Minami; Storyboarded by : Kazuhito Kikuchi	Seiko Watanabe	February 27, 1993
6	"Enter! The Fated Rival" "Tōjō! Shukumei no Raibaru" (登場! 宿命のライバル)	Directed by : Naoki Hishikawa; Storyboarded by : Tsuneo Tominaga	Yoshiyuki Suga	March 6, 1993
7	"The Devil's Great Character Burning" "Akuma no Daimonji-yaki" (悪魔の大文字焼き)	Kunihisa Sugishima	Sumio Uetake	March 13, 1993
8	"Don't Touch Natto!" "Nattō ni Tewodasuna" (納豆に手を出すな!)	Hiroshi Ishiodori	Toshiki Inoue	March 27, 1993
9	"Roulette of Terror" "Kyōfu no Rūretto" (恐怖のルーレット)	Katsuyoshi Yatabe	Hiroyuki Kawasaki	April 3, 1993
10	"Mifune Buddha's Hellish Blessing" "Mifune Daibutsu no Goriyaku Jigoku" (ミフネ大仏の御利益地獄)	Naoki Hishikawa	Yoshiyuki Suga	April 10, 1993
11	"Crimson Wings! Hiryu Appears" "Kurenai no Tsubasa Hiryū Tōjō" (紅の翼! 飛龍登場)	Directed by : Yasuhiro Minami; Storyboarded by : Tesaki Okuno	Yasushi Hirano	April 17, 1993
12	"The Ring of Saros" "Sarosu no Yubiwa" (サロスの指輪)	Kunihisa Sugishima	Hiroyuki Kawasaki	April 24, 1993
13	"Duel in the Wilderness" "Kōyanokettō" (荒野の決闘)	Hiroshi Ishiodori	Sumio Uetake	May 1, 1993
14	"Bombers Die at Dusk?!" "Bonbāzu Yūyami ni Shisu?!" (ボンバーズ夕闇に死す?!)	Directed by : Osamu Sekita; Storyboarded by : Kazuhito Kikuchi	Seiko Watanabe	May 8, 1993
15	"The Most Dangerous Game" "Motto mo Kiken'na Yūgi" (最も危険な遊戯(ゲーム))	Naoki Hishikawa	Yoshiyuki Suga	May 15, 1993
16	"Black Gaine" "Burakku Gain" (ブラックガイン)	Kunihisa Sugishima	Toshiki Inoue	May 22, 1993
17	"Completed! Battle Bomber" "Kansei! Batorubonbā" (完成! バトルボンバー)	Directed by : Yasuhiro Minami; Storyboarded by : Tesaki Okuno	Masaharu Amiya	May 29, 1993
18	"Forever Beautiful" "Eien (Towa) ni Utsukushiku" (永遠(とわ)に美しく)	Hiroshi Ishiodori	Sumio Uetake	June 5, 1993
19	"Revival of Sengoku Warlords" "Yomigaeru Sengoku Bushō" (よみがえる戦国武将)	Directed by : Osamu Sekita; Storyboarded by : Kazuhito Kikuchi	Hiroyuki Kawasaki	June 12, 1993
20	"The Lurking Shadow of a Gigantic Evil" "Ugomeku Kyodaina Aku no Kage" (うごめく巨大な悪の影)	Naoki Hishikawa	Takao Koyama	June 19, 1993
21	"Brave Express Investigation Order" "Yūsha Tokkyū Chōsa Shirei" (勇者特急調査指令)	Kunihisa Sugishima	Masaharu Amiya	June 26, 1993
22	"Beautiful Flower of Evil" "Utsukushiki Aku no Hana" (美しき悪の華)	Yasuhiro Minami	Seiko Watanabe	July 3, 1993
23	"Clash! Hiryu VS Might Gaine" "Gekitotsu! Hiryū VS Maitogain" (激突! 飛龍VSマイトガイン)	Directed by : Naoki Hishikawa; Storyboarded by : Kazuhito Kikuchi	Yoshiyuki Suga	July 10, 1993
24	"Might Kaizer Appears!" "Maitokaizā Kenzan!" (マイトカイザー見参!)	Masamitsu Hidaka	Yoshiyuki Suga	July 17, 1993
25	"The Heart of Justice is Ten Thousand Degrees" "Seigi no Hāto wa Ichimando" (正義のハートは一万度)	Yasuhiro Minami	Hiroyuki Kawasaki	July 24, 1993
26	"Terror of the Red Mist" "Akai Kiri no Kyōfu" (赤い霧の恐怖)	Kunihisa Sugishima	Sumio Uetake	July 31, 1993
27	"Take Off! Great Might Gaine" "Tobiate! G (Gurēto) Maitogain" (飛び立て! G (グレート)マイトガイン)	Directed by : Yasuhiro Minami; Storyboarded by : Tesaki Okuno	Sumio Uetake	August 7, 1993
28	"Mifune's Country Conquering Summit" "Mifune no Kunitori Samitto" (ミフネの国盗りサミット)	Naoki Hishikawa	Takao Koyama; Kaoru Kasai	August 14, 1993
29	"Hero's Holiday" "Yūsha no Kyūjitsu" (勇者の休日)	Directed by : Yasuhiro Minami; Storyboarded by : Kazuhito Kikuchi	Masaharu Amiya	August 21, 1993
30	"Fight! Ramen Stall" "Tatakae! Yatai Rāmen" (戦え! 屋台ラーメン)	Kunihisa Sugishima	Yoshiyuki Suga	August 28, 1993
31	"Friendship Fusion Battle" "Yūjō no Gattai Batoru" (友情の合体バトル)	Yasuhiro Minami	Yoshiyuki Suga	September 11, 1993
32	"Bullet Express Might Gunner" "Dangan Tokkyū Maitoganā" (弾丸特急マイトガンナー)	Masamitsu Hidaka	Masaharu Amiya	September 25, 1993
33	"Debut! Female Nezumi Kozō?!" "Sanjō! On'na Nezumi Kozō?!" (参上! 女ねずみ小僧?!)	Naoki Hishikawa	Yoshimasa Takahashi	October 2, 1993
34	"Nightmare on Air" "Akumu no Oneā" (悪夢のオンエアー)	Directed by : Yasuhiro Minami; Storyboarded by : Kazuhito Kikuchi	Yasunori Yamada	October 9, 1993
35	"Showdown! Goryu VS Great" "Kessen! Gōryū VS Gurēto" (決戦! 轟龍VSグレート)	Kunihisa Sugishima	Yoshiyuki Suga	October 16, 1993
36	"Giant Pumpkin Attack" "Kyodai Kabocha no Shūrai" (巨大カボチャの襲来)	Hiroshi Ishiodori	Yoshimichi Hosoi	October 23, 1993
37	"Butterfly Dream" "Kochō no Yume" (胡蝶の夢)	Directed by : Naoki Hishikawa; Storyboarded by : Katsuyoshi Yatabe	Sumio Uetake	November 6, 1993
38	"Great Edo Land's Declaration of Independence" "Ōedo Rando Dokuritsu Sen" (大江戸ランド独立宣言)	Directed by : Yasuhiro Minami; Storyboarded by : Kazuhito Kikuchi	Yoshimasa Takahashi	November 13, 1993
39	"Uncover the Hero's Secret!" "Yūsha no Himitsu ni Semare!" (勇者の秘密に迫れ!)	Tesaki Okuno	Sumio Uetake	November 20, 1993
40	"I'll Have a Dinosaur!" "Kyōryū Itadakimasu!" (恐竜いただきます!)	Kunihisa Sugishima	Masaharu Amiya	November 27, 1993
41	"Black Terror" "Kuroi Seritsu" (黒い戦慄)	Masamitsu Hidaka	Yoshiyuki Suga	December 4, 1993
42	"Five-Body Flame Attack" "Honō no Gotai Renketsu Kōgeki" (炎の五体連結攻撃)	Naoki Hishikawa	Sumio Uetake	December 11, 1993
43	"Devil's Baptism" "Akuma no Senrei" (悪魔の洗礼)	Hiroshi Ishiodori	Yoshiyuki Suga	December 18, 1993
44	"Last Christmas" "Saigo no Kurisumasu" (最後のクリスマス)	Kunihisa Sugishima	Takao Koyama	December 25, 1993
45	"World Conquest Strategy" "Sekai Seifuku Sakusen" (世界征服作戦)	Directed by : Naoki Hishikawa; Storyboarded by : Kazuhito Kikuchi	Takao Koyama	January 8, 1994
46	"Escape from Despair" "Zetsubō kara no Dasshutsu" (絶望からの脱出)	Masamitsu Hidaka	Takao Koyama	January 15, 1994
47	"A Stormy Final Episode" "Arashi o Yobu Saishūkai" (嵐を呼ぶ最終回)	Directed by : Yasuhiro Minami; Storyboarded by : Tesaki Okuno	Takao Koyama	January 22, 1994

== Video games ==
Might Gaine was adapted in the Brave Saga games like all other Braves entries, and was one of the series adapted in New Century Brave Wars. It was also adapted into Super Robot Wars V for the PlayStation 4 and PlayStation Vita, featuring every member of the Brave Express Team as playable characters although the individual bombers and dividers only appeared in cutscenes. Black Might Gaine is also a secret. In good faith to the show Black Noir is featured in the penultimate battle, revealing to be the author of every major conflict including incidents from other anime, and teams up with the Emperor of Darkness from Mazinger Edition Z: The Impact!. Unlike the series Black Noir is speculated by other protagonists to be a creation from a technologically advanced civilization that thought too highly of himself. Might Gaine is also featured in the spiritual follow up Super Robot Wars X on the same systems & Super Robot Wars T.

Preceded by The Brave Fighter of Legend Da-Garn	Brave series 1993-1994	Succeeded by Brave Police J-Decker
