= Gun Sword =

Japanese animated television series

- Gun X Sword
- Gun X Sword part one DVD cover

ガン × ソード (Gan Sōdo)
- Genre: Mecha; Science fiction Comedy drama Adventure
- Anime television series
- Directed by: Gorō Taniguchi
- Produced by: Hiroyuki Birukawa; Hiroyuki Saeki
- Written by: Hideyuki Kurata
- Music by: Kōtarō Nakagawa
- Studio: AIC ASTA
- Licensed by: Crunchyroll (Note: In North America through Crunchyroll, LLC (formerly known as Funimation) and in Australia through Crunchyroll Store Australia.): UK: MVM Films
- Original network: TV Tokyo
- English network: CA: G4techTV (Anime Current); SEA: Animax Asia
- Original run: July 4, 2005 – December 26, 2005
- Episodes: 26

Gun X Sword (Japanese: ガン × ソード, Hepburn: Gan Sōdo; stylized as GUN×SWORD), is a Japanese anime television series animated by AIC A.S.T.A, written by Hideyuki Kurata, and directed by Gorō Taniguchi.

== Plot ==
The story is set on the "Planet of Endless Illusion", a place where rogues of all sorts gather. The protagonist, Van, travels the world searching for a man with a clawed right hand who killed his bride. He is joined by several other travelers along the way, each linked to the clawed man by a personal loss.

== Production ==
Gun X Sword was first announced by JVC in May 2005 through the reveal of its official website. Despite its aesthetics in the anime's premiere, director Goro Taniguchi claimed Gun Sword is not a Western series. He wanted to convey the series is not simple, that is why he decided to bring the mecha area already in the first episode. Kurata wanted to play homage to the mecha genre which had been highly popular during the making of the anime. Van was often compared with Vash the Stampede from Trigun due to how they avoid fights but Van was more written as a lazy character rather than the pacifist fighter from the other series. Still, the series is not only inspired by mecha such as Voltron, but also as Hollywood movies such as Independence Day. Taniguchi expressed difficulties on the team working together to produce their own title after several discussion about the trajectory of the narrative. Takahiro Kimura made the character designs with Van's design having several primilar looks in the making of the series which took about six months to finish. Wendy and Carmen instead led to faster results. Meanwhile, Kurata wanted the villains to look menacing as a result of the episodic style using ideas from Read or Die. His favorite villain was Lucky Roulette as he considers him an "epitome" of villains that commonly seen in B movies.

As the first episode had a violent style, the next ones were instead given a more calm story, resulting in a change of villains into Baron Mayor. Kimura kept designing characters after reading the scripts. The thirteenth episode was specifically written as the midpoint of the story as the style would change and become more serious until the climax. Across the first half, the villains were written as hilarious until the introduction of the main antagonist, Claw. In order to make Claw stand out as a villain, he was given both a polite personality that contrasts his murderous intent. In the end, the staff believed Van's and Wendy's story were fully completed, making no need for a sequel. Several studios collaborated with Tangichu in the making of the anime, making it important for anime fans.

=== Release ===
The series aired on TV Tokyo from July 4 to December 26, 2005, totaling 26 episodes. It was collected in a total of thirteen DVD volumes by Victor between October 21, 2005, and October 25, 2023. A Blu-ray box was released on April 26, 2017. In the DVD volumes of Gun X Sword, there are 2 episodes tied into each volume in the extras with episode 13 on its own in the final one. The opening theme is "GUNXSWORD" by Kōtarō Nakagawa while the ending themes are "A Rising Tide" by Shuntarō Okino (episodes 1 to 8, 10, 12 to 16, 18 to 21, 23, 25), "Paradiso" by Hitomi (episodes 9 and 11), "S.O.S" by Kikuko Inoue, Houko Kuwashima, Satsuki Yukino & Saeko Chiba (episode 17), "A Rising Tide" (acoustic version) by Shuntaro Okino (episode 22), "Calling You" by Shuntaro Okino (episode 24), and "GUNXSWORD" (starting again) by Kotaro Nakagawa and Ondekoza (episode 26). The insert songs are "Niji no Kanata" by Satsuki Yukino (episode 3) and "La Speranza" by Hitomi (episodes 16, 25). Two official CD soundstracks were also released in Japan on September 22, 2005, and December 7, 2005.

The series was licensed in June 2005 for North America by Geneon Entertainment, who produced an English dub overseen by New Generation Pictures. The dub is also available in Australia from Madman Entertainment and in the United Kingdom by MVM Films. At Anime Central 2010, North American anime distributor Funimation announced that they have rescued Gun X Sword and re-released the series in late 2010. In 2022, Crunchyroll got access to the series and started streaming it both in Japanese and English.

These are a series of 13 omake episodes of Gun Sword tied in very loosely to the plot with the characters as chibi puppets. The main characters are Wendy and her turtle, Kameo, the size of a human in this series and able to talk. Michael, Van and Carmen also appear voiced by their voice actors in the mainstream episodes. All the episodes seem to center around analyzing various events in Gun X Sword and mocking the themes displayed.

== Other ==
A novelization of the anime by Hideyuki Kurata, was published by Kadokawa Shoten on January 1, 2006.

The series is included in the 2009 Super Robot Wars game, Super Robot Wars K, for the Nintendo DS, the 2019 game Super Robot Wars T for Nintendo Switch and PlayStation 4 and the 2021 game Super Robot Wars 30 for Nintendo Switch, PlayStation 4 and Microsoft Windows.

== Reception ==
The official Blu-ray of Gun Sword sold 4,818 units in Japan.
