= Super Robot Spirits =

1998 video game

- Developer: Banpresto
- Publisher: Banpresto
- Series: Super Robot Wars
- Platform: Nintendo 64
- Release: JP: July 17, 1998
- Genre: Fighting
- Modes: Single-player, multiplayer

Super Robot Spirits (Note: Japanese: スーパーロボットスピリッツ, Hepburn: Sūpā Robotto Supirittsu) is a 3D fighting game for the Nintendo 64, released only in Japan in 1998. It is a spinoff of the Super Robot Wars line of games, and similarly features combat between mecha from different anime series.

== Gameplay ==
In-game screenshot

Super Robot Spirits is a 3D fighting game that pits players in one-on-one battles against mecha from select Japanese anime series. The plot involves an ongoing war throughout the universe between humans and a fleet of robots named the "Aerogater". To stop the Aerogater from destroying Earth, robots from other dimensions are transported to Earth to destroy them once and for all. Spirits includes seven playable characters from the start: Shining Gundam from Mobile Fighter G Gundam, Daitarn 3 from Invincible Steel Man Daitarn 3, Dunbine from Aura Battler Dunbine, Voltes V from Chōdenji Machine Voltes V, Walker Gallier from Combat Mecha Xabungle, Dancouga from Dancouga – Super Beast Machine God, and R-1, a robot created by Banpresto that first appeared in the 1996 PlayStation game Shin Super Robot Wars. By fulfilling certain conditions, players can also unlock the Master Gundam and Devil Gundam from Mobile Fighter G Gundam, and the Judecca from Super Robot Wars Alpha.

The game is presented from a 2.5D perspective; while the characters and environments are rendered in 3D, the gameplay takes place on a 2D plane. Each character is able to kick, punch, block incoming attacks, and use weapons such as turret guns and energy swords. In each battle, which are made to represent anime episodes, the player must defeat their opponent by depleting their health. Hitting opponents provides the player with "spirit skills", which fill up an orange gauge underneath their health bar. Spirit skills are used to unleash a powerful super attack, which can't be deflected by opponents. Super attacks differ for each character, and are stronger depending on how many spirit skills the player possesses, and are different for each character. The player can also combine their weapons with an attack to cause a different super attack to unfold, which varies depending on the character selected.

== Reception ==
Reception

Review scores
Publication	Score
Famitsu	25/40
Gamers' Republic	C+
N64 Magazine	58%
Total! Germany	5/6
Ultra 64	72/100

Super Robot Spirits received largely mediocre reviews from publications. It struggled to gain sales; according to Famitsu, it only sold around 9,000 copies total. Spirits sold significantly less than the other Super Robot game on the console, Super Robot Wars 64, which sold over 100,000 copies total.

The game's graphics were met with mixed reactions. Martin Kitts of N64 Magazine was particularly critical of the backdrops, which he stated were poorly-drawn and created a bad contrast with the character models. Kitts also criticized the graphical effects for being poorly-designed, using the ghosting effects with the special moves and the feet of the player's robot disappearing underwater as examples. The staff at Gamers' Republic felt that the graphics were of decent quality, as were the character animations. Disagreeing with both publications was Tobias Partetzke of Total! Germany, who believed that the visuals were mediocre at best and the animations were stiff and awkward. Publications believed that the beginning of Super Robot Spirits had a good presentation. Kitts labeled its opening animation as "stylish", and one that was close to impressing its players upon boot-up. Ultra 64's Eric commented that the game presents itself a nice atmosphere.

Most critics disliked Super Robot Spirits for its gameplay. Eric felt that it was lacking in design and omits what he considered to be basic mechanics for any fighting game, such as a large amount of movesets for each character. Partetzke, whose review of the game was largely scathing, claimed the gameplay was so awful that he wouldn't have been surprised if Banpresto did it on purpose, in an ironic attempt to make the Nintendo 64's worst fighting game. On the contrary, Gamers' Republic believed that Super Robot Spirits posed the best fighting game engine on the console, finding it superior to Konami's Rakugakids. While they disliked the playing arenas for being bland and uninspired, they enjoyed the character movesets and powerful super attacks. The controls themselves were criticized for their simplicity, which Kitts claimed was a pointless decision due to how few moves the characters actually possessed. The game's story mode and multiplayer were praised and seen as the highlights of the game. Overall, critics stated that Super Robot Spirits was a poorly-designed fighting game that was clearly rushed to market in hopes to capitalize on the properties used. Kitts described it as being "a crushing disappointment for fans of the cartoons", a waste of so many beloved licenses, and an average-at-best fighter for the platform. Eric agreed with his statement and further added that it would serve as nothing but a disappointment for fans. Partetzke likened the game to Hudson's Dual Heroes, another poorly-received fighter for the Nintendo 64. He believed that Spirits felt like more like an unfinished prototype than a completed product, concluding his review with: "Be glad that this terrible trash has not been announced for Germany!"
