= Invincible Robo Trider G7 =

Japanese anime television series

- Japanese DVD cover art of the first volume

無敵ロボトライダーG7 (Muteki Robo Toraidā Jī Sebun)
- Genre: Mecha
- Created by: Hajime Yatate
- Anime television series
- Directed by: Katsutoshi Sasaki
- Written by: Hiroyuki Hoshiyama
- Music by: Juichi Sase
- Studio: Nippon Sunrise; Sotsu Agency
- Original network: Nagoya TV
- Original run: February 2, 1980 – January 24, 1981
- Episodes: 50

Invincible Robo Trider G7 (無敵ロボトライダーG7, Muteki Robo Toraidā Jī Sebun) is a Japanese mecha anime television series produced by Sunrise that aired from 1980 to 1981. It was also referred to as "Trider G7", "Unchallengeable Trider G7", "Tryder G7", "Bird Attack Tryder G7" and "Unrivaled Robot Trider G7".

The story follows sixth-grader Watta Takeo's life as he balances his school life, being the president of a company, and battling a robotic empire from outer space. While a Super Robot series at heart, it depicts a realistic take on the genre, such as announcing to nearby citizens that Trider G7 was being activated and having to consider the monetary expenses of battle.

== Plot ==
Invincible Robo Trider G7 portrays the attempted alien invasion by the Robot Empire to take over Earth. Rebelling against this, the scientist Nabalon, who was exiled from the Empire, meets the protagonist Watta's father, and together, they design the transforming robot Trider G7.

Watta's father dies in an accident, and Watta has no choice but to succeed him at both his job and piloting Trider. As the president of the Takeo General Company, Watta must now fight to ensure everyone's happiness, as well as the condition of the company's funds.

== Characters ==
=== Takeo General Company ===
Watta Takeo (竹尾 ワッ太, Takeo Watta)
Voiced by: Satomi Majima
The orphaned second president of the company, called "Young President" by his subordinates as he is only in the sixth grade. He is the only person that can utilize Trider G7. He is full of valor despite his age, and takes his role as the pilot of Trider G7 with great pride.
Umemaro Kakikōji (柿小路 梅麻呂, Kakikōji Umemaro)
Voiced by: Ichirō Nagai
A manager 64 years of age; he can immediately calculate how much costs for Trider G7's basic functions will be.
Tetsuo Atsui (厚井 鉄男, Atsui Tetsuo)
Voiced by: Yuzuru Fujimoto
A director, and the only mechanic; he can do everything from repairing Trider to fixing an air conditioner. He pilots the Shuttle and provides support for Watta.
Tōhachirō Kinoshita (木下 藤八郎, Kinoshita Tōhachirou)
Voiced by: Tokio Shōji
A subsection chief, but he doesn't actually get much work due to the company's structure. He is frivolous, but jovial, and other characters find it impossible to hate him.
Ikue Sunabara (砂原 郁絵, Sunabara Ikue)
Voiced by: Keiko Han / Yumi Touma (in Shin Super Robot Wars)
The only woman of the company, an 18-year-old girl in charge of accounting, office work, and making tea.
Michitarō Takeo (竹尾 道太郎, Takeo Michitarō)
Voiced by: Tatsuo Ogata
Watta's father, and the previous president of the company. Deceased by the time the anime begins.
Nabalon (ナバロン, Nabaron)
Trider G7's designer, and a scientist who defected to Earth from the Robot Empire.

== Mechanics ==
Trider G7 (トライダーG7, Trider G7)
The titular robot of the series, piloted by Watta Takeo. It stands at 57 meters tall and weighs 777 tons. It hosts a variety of weapons, including the Trider Saber and the Trider Beam Cannon. It is able to transform into six distinct states, each one useful for a different terrain, such as space, land, sky, and water.
Shuttle (シャトル, Shuttle)
A support shuttle for the Trider G7 that first appears in episode 27. Kakikouji, Tetsuo, Touhachirou, and Sunabara all pilot it. Its main armament is a pair of missile launchers.

== Production ==
The narration in the show was performed by Ichirou Nagai, who did the narration for Mobile Suit Gundam. Up until that point, many series airing on TV Asahi in the series' timeslot had their soundtracks composed by Takeo Watanabe and Yuushi Matsuyama, but as the two were working on the soundtrack for the theatrical adaptation of Mobile Suit Gundam, Kurando Kaya filled in the role.

== Themes ==
Rather than depicting robots as a military weapon like Mobile Suit Gundam did, the aim of the story was to portray how a giant robot would be operated in the real world. Trider G7's own unrealistic abilities are explained by scientists that were exiled from the enemy empire, as Trider G7's capabilities are far beyond that of the other Earth-made robots in the show. In addition, the Robot Empire was notable compared to other villains from contemporary mecha series by having little to no interaction with the human protagonists, as they are unaware that their own scientists built Trider G7.

== Media ==
Invincible Robo Trider G7 aired from February 2, 1980, until January 24, 1981, spanning 50 episodes. It was also broadcast in Italy in 1981 under the name L'Indistruttibile Robot Trider G7. As with other super robot shows of the time, toys of the titular robot were produced by the toy company Clover.

A DVD boxset of the series was released in 2005, and an Italian boxset was released in 2012 which contains both the Italian dub and the original Japanese audio. The series has been featured in various installments of the Super Robot Wars franchise of video games as well, including Shin Super Robot Wars and the Super Robot Wars Z metaseries.
