= UFO Robot Grendizer vs. Great Mazinger =

Short film mecha anime

- Poster of UFO Robot Grendizer vs. Great Mazinger

UFOロボ グレンダイザー対グレートマジンガー (UFO Robo Gurendaizā tai Gurēto Majingā)
- Genre: Action, mecha
- Anime film
- Directed by: Osamu Kasai
- Produced by: Chiaki Imada
- Written by: Keisuke Fujikawa
- Music by: Shunsuke Kikuchi; Michiaki Watanabe
- Studio: Toei Doga, Dynamic Planning
- Released: March 20, 1976
- Runtime: 27 minutes
- Manga
- Written by: Go Nagai
- Illustrated by: Ken Ishikawa
- Published by: Kodansha
- Magazine: TV Magazine
- Published: April 1976

UFO Robot Grendizer vs. Great Mazinger (UFOロボ グレンダイザー対グレートマジンガー, UFO Robo Gurendaizā tai Gurēto Majingā) is a 1976 animated short film that crosses over Go Nagai's super robots Grendizer and Great Mazinger. The movie features alternate versions of events from both series, and, as with the rest of the Vs. films, is not canonical to either one. The film was released in almost all countries where the original Grendizer and Great Mazinger series were also shown, most prominently in Italy, France and the Middle East.The movie was also ( unofficially ) dubbed in Russian in 2025 30 years after Grendizer series was shown in Russia. The dub features the same VAs who dubbed the original series in the mid 90s

== Plot ==
After many attempts to destroy Grendizer and conquer Earth, King Vega sends General Barendos and his troops in a special mission. Before landing, Barendos stops at moonbase and warns the two officials there that in case of his success they will be both dismissed and killed. Barendos arrives on earth and captures Duke Fleed's closest ally, Koji Kabuto. While under a mind control in captivity, Koji reveals the history and location of both Mazinger Z and Great Mazinger. King Vega seizes the opportunity to capture the Great Mazinger, and then forces Duke Fleed and his Grendizer to do battle against Great Mazinger. Grendizer and Great Mazinger clash in battle until Grendizer manages to deactivate Great Mazinger using a special shot, suggested by Koji. In the forth chapter (titled Terror of the Two Demons) of one of the Grendizer manga adaptations, Koji Kabuto and Tetsuya Tsurugi are mind controlled by a brain wave machine created by Vegan Commander Depel. This attempt was countered thanks to Boss Borot damaging Gepel's base and destroying the brain wave machine, ending the Mazingers from going on a rampage and destroying the city. The chapter ends in a battle between Mazinger Z, Great Mazinger, and Grendizer against Saucer Beast Zardan, with the heroes claiming victory.

== Staff ==
- Production Studio: Toei Doga, Dynamic Planning
- Original work: Go Nagai, Dynamic Planning
- Director: Osamu Kasai
- Assistant director: Johei Matsura
- Animation director: Kazuo Komatsubara
- Scenario: Keisuke Fujikawa
- Planning: Ken Ariga, Toshio Katsuta
- Producer: Chiaki Imada
- Art director: Iwamitsu Ito
- Music: Shunsuke Kikuchi, Michiaki Watanabe
- Theme Song: "Uchuu no Yuusha Grendizer" by Isao Sasaki
- Cast: Kei Tomiyama (Duke Fleed / Daisuke Umon), Hiroya Ishimaru (Koji Kabuto), Joji Yanami (Dr. Umon), Chiyoko Kawashima (Hikaru Makiba), Kazuko Sawada (Goro Makiba), Kenichi Ogata (Blacky), Kosei Tomita (Gandal Shirei), Junji Yamada

== See also ==
- UFO Robot Grendizer
- Great Mazinger
