= Super Robot Wars V =

2017 video game

- Developer: B.B. Studio
- Publisher: Bandai Namco Entertainment
- Directors: Masahiro Nagura; Makoto Anzai
- Producers: Takenobu Terada; Shinya Satake; Kensuke Tsukanaka
- Artists: Eiichi Shimizu; Hajime Katoki; Kazutaka Miyatake
- Writers: Masahiro Nagura; Kouki Imashi
- Composer: Salamander Factory
- Series: Super Robot Wars
- Platforms: PlayStation 4; PlayStation Vita; Nintendo Switch; Microsoft Windows (Steam)
- Release: February 23, 2017: PS4, PSV; JP: February 23, 2017 Switch, Windows; JP: October 3, 2019
- Genre: Tactical role-playing
- Mode: Single-player

Super Robot Wars V (スーパーロボット大戦V, Sūpā Robotto Taisen V) is a tactical role-playing game developed by B.B. Studio and published by Bandai Namco Entertainment for the PlayStation 4 and PlayStation Vita. Released as part of Super Robot Wars' 25th anniversary, it is the eighth standalone entry to the series since Super Robot Wars NEO, with the game's continued focus on the massive crossover between different mecha anime series released in Japan. It is released in Asia on February 23, 2017. A Nintendo Switch and Steam ports of the game were released on October 3, 2019.

== Gameplay ==
Similar to the previous entries in the series, Super Robot Wars V is a Tactical RPG game with story elements and utilizes the same graphics engine seen in 3rd Super Robot Wars Z, but with an inclusion of a 3d isometric map unlike its predecessor. It follows the same basic structure as in previous games: when a stage begins, the character receives introductory dialogue between playable characters, leading to the scenario on the battlefield. To complete a scenario, the player must accomplish scenario objectives. Some scenarios are longer, with multi-part missions or have new objectives added as the story unfolds. On battlefield, the player and enemy take turns to order their units with commands available, such as movement, attacking, forming squads and casting "Spirit Commands", a set of magic-like spells unique to each pilot. Once the scenario is cleared, more dialogue is exchanged between characters before the player is taken to an intermission menu. Here, units can be upgraded or optional parts installed, characters' stats and skills can be changed or upgraded, and other maintenance actions can be performed before the player continues on with the game.

Newer gameplay elements have also been brought into the game with the reintroduction of the Beginner's Mode. It also introduces a new Skill Route and Skill Program function, which allows players to fully customize pilots' skills using Tactical Points, which were obtained through the game's play-through. The game also features two new gameplay mechanics: Extra Order and Extra Action. Extra Action allows player units to use ExC points in each stage to gain advantage in battle while Extra Order allows battleship units to raise spirits of each units. Aside from the new features, combination attacks also return in the game as well as a Remote Play and Cross Save function to play the game in both the Vita and the PlayStation 4 without losing progress. Both games will not allow any recording and screenshots except to certain scenes of the game. Downloadable content has also been made available for the title.

== Plot ==
The creation of the first unified government over all humanity, the Earth Federation, marked the beginning of a new era: New Correct Century, and the beginning of humanity's expansion into space. However, it was also said to be the beginning of a new era of war. The battle between Earthnoids and Spacenoids that began with the One Year War raged on through Char's Rebellion, giving way to the so-called 10 Year Void, a decade-long gap in recorded history.

A century has passed since then, and after the end of the Jupiter War, the Earth Federation was invaded by an alien species known as the "Gamillas". The Gamillas established a forward base on Pluto, and launched planet bombs at Earth. The planet bombs destroyed the space colonies and devastated Earth. The oceans were evaporated, the air was polluted, and the survivors were forced to retreat to shelters deep underground. Scientists estimated that only one year remained before humanity's extinction.

The story revolves around Soji Murakumo and Chitose Kisaragi, who were caught up with the war with the Gamillas in the New Correct Century. While on their escape to the last hope of mankind: the space battleship Yamato, Soji/Chitose stumble upon a mysterious mobile unit constructed by the federation. Dubbed the VangRay, he/she pilots it in order to fend off the Gamillas invasion and buy time for the Yamato to appear and score humanity's first victory against them. With a promise of salvation from a distant planet known as Iscandar, Soji/Chitose join up with the Yamato crew in order to save mankind and depart on a journey of one hundred and sixty-eight thousand light years to Iscandar, not knowing they will encounter strange dimensional disturbances on the way.

== Development ==
First announced at the 25th Anniversary Live Event alongside Super Robot Wars Original Generation: The Moon Dwellers, Super Robot Wars V continues the trend of the series for being a crossover tactical role-playing game featuring various mecha anime series from other studios. It is also announced in the live event that it is the second game in the series to officially receive an English release in Asia and the first game in series to be given a C rating by CERO. In addition to the enhanced animation and graphics seen in 3rd Super Robot Wars Z: Celestial Prison Chapter, the game also includes a cross-save feature like the previous entry.

The game itself marks a lot of new entries to the series and also a lot of returns. The game marks the return of both Mobile Suit Gundam ZZ and Mobile Suit Crossbone Gundam into the series proper, the first introduction of the second Brave Series into the game in the form of The Brave Express Might Gaine, and the debut of a non-mecha space opera anime series into the game in the form of Star Blazers: Space Battleship Yamato 2199,. However, the game marked as the first Super Robot Wars game to not include a series animated by Toei Animation.

In the game's first promotional trailer, the game debuts the "Mazin Emperor G" (Japanese: マジンエンペラーG, Hepburn: Majin Enperā G), an upgrade to Tetsuya's Great Mazinger, making it the second original Mazinger Mecha to debut in the game since Mazinkaiser. The game also introduces the original mecha "VangRay" (Japanese: ヴァングレイ, Hepburn: Vangurei), designed by Linebarrels of Iron Author and Mecha Designer Eiichi Shimizu, piloted by Soji Murakumo and Chitose Kisaragi. The game also reintroduces both the original versions of the Huckebein and the Grungust, piloted by Veltav Text and Charlotte Hastings, making it the third game to reintroduce both units since Super Robot Wars Alpha and five years after the absence of both the Huckebein and the original Grungust in 2nd Super Robot Wars Original Generation.

According to Takenobu Terada, the "V" in the title stands for "Voyage", which represents the Franchise's new growth such as its marketing and localization outside Japan. Also, a Premium Sound edition of the game has been announced. Bandai Namco later announced that the second promotional video was released on January 17, 2017, revealing more information about the game including the game mechanics and gameplay.

== Series included ==
- Banpresto Originals

- 4th Super Robot Wars^{b}^{c}^{d}

- Super Machine Zambot 3
- The Unchallengeable Daitarn 3
- Mobile Suit Zeta Gundam
- Mobile Suit Gundam ZZ
- Mobile Suit Gundam: Char's Counterattack
- Mobile Suit Gundam: Hathaway's Flash^{a}^{c}
- Mobile Suit Crossbone Gundam

- Mobile Suit Crossbone Gundam: Skull Heart^{a}
- Mobile Suit Crossbone Gundam: The Steel 7^{a}^{c}

- Mobile Suit Gundam SEED Destiny
- Mobile Suit Gundam 00 the Movie: A Wakening of the Trailblazer
- Mobile Suit Gundam Unicorn
- The Brave Express Might Gaine^{a}
- Martian Successor Nadesico: The Motion Picture – Prince of Darkness
- Getter Robo Armageddon
- True Mazinger Edition Z: The Impact!

- True Mazinger ZERO
- True Mazinger ZERO vs. Great General of Darkness^{a}

- Full Metal Panic!

- Full Metal Panic? Fumoffu
- Full Metal Panic! The Second Raid
- Full Metal Panic! (Light Novels)

- Rebuild of Evangelion

- Evangelion: 1.0 You Are (Not) Alone
- Evangelion: 2.0 You Can (Not) Advance
- Evangelion: 3.0 You Can (Not) Redo^{c}

- Star Blazers: Space Battleship Yamato 2199^{a}
- Cross Ange: Rondo of Angel and Dragon^{a}

Notes
^a Debuting series.
^b The Huckebein in the game was based on its original 4th Super Robot Wars appearance, instead of using a redesign seen in Super Robot Taisen: Original Generation. The Grungust retains the same appearance from its original game also.
^c Mecha only.
^d Downloadable Content.

== Music ==
The game's official music is composed by music studio Salamander Factory, with Takanori Arima as its music director. The game also marks the first time Dan Rudin became in charge as audio mixing engineer alongside his recording studio. The game's opening and ending themes are performed by Anison group JAM Project, with the single "The Exceeder" being officially released on March 1, 2017.

== Reception ==
Japanese gaming magazine Famitsu rated the game a 34/40, With the game itself selling more than 500,000 Copies in both Japan and Asia. Destructoid gave it a 7.5/10, praising for the game being a "love letter to the featured series. It's beautifully animated, and it has fun with the shows while remaining respectful to the source material." However it was criticized for lack of challenge stating "It's just a shame that despite all that, the challenge isn't there, and for the length that it runs, that's just not acceptable. If you come for the fanservice, you'll have a great time, but if you're looking for a challenging strategy game, it may be best to look elsewhere."

It was awarded the "Gold Prize" award by Sony at the 2018 PlayStation Awards.

The Nintendo Switch version of Super Robot Wars V was the eighteenth bestselling retail game during its first week of release in Japan, with 4,213 copies being sold.
