= 4th Super Robot Wars =

1995 video game

- Developer: Winkysoft
- Publisher: Banpresto
- Series: Super Robot Wars
- Platforms: Super Famicom; Sony PlayStation; Sega Saturn; PlayStation Network
- Release: Super Famicom: JP: March 17, 1995; Sega Saturn (As Super Robot Wars F and F Final): JP: September 25, 1997 (F) April 23, 1998 (F Final); PlayStation: JP: January 26, 1996 (4 Scramble) December 10, 1998 (F) April 15, 1999 (F Final); PlayStation Network: JP: July 6, 2011 (4 Scramble) November 19, 2011 (Both F and F Final)
- Genre: Tactical role-playing
- Mode: Single-player

4th Super Robot Wars (第4次スーパーロボット大戦, Dai 4 Ji Sūpā Robotto Taisen) is a tactical RPG for the Super Famicom developed by both Banpresto and Winky Soft and published by Banpresto. It is the 5th entry in the Super Robot Wars series and the last entry in the Classic Timeline. It was first released on March 17, 1995, and received mostly positive reception, with reviewers highly praising the improvements from the last game while criticizing the game's increased difficulty. The game was ported to the Sony PlayStation and released on January 26, 1996, under the name 4th Super Robot Wars Scramble (第4次スーパーロボット大戦S, Dai 4 ji Sūpā Robotto Taisen S).

== Gameplay ==
Gameplay of 4th Super Robot Wars is literally similar to its predecessor, Super Robot Wars EX which uses battle sprites for animations. When a stage begins, the character receives introductory dialogue between playable characters, leading to the scenario on the battle field. To complete a scenario, the player must accomplish scenario objectives. Some scenarios are longer, with multi-part missions or have new objectives added as the story unfolds. On battle field, the player and enemy take turns to order their units with commands available, such as movement, attacking, forming squads and casting "Spirit Commands", a set of magic-like spells unique to each pilot. Once the scenario is cleared, more dialogue is exchanged between characters before the player is taken to an intermission menu. Here, units can be upgraded or optional parts installed, characters' stats and skills can be changed or upgraded, and other maintenance actions can be performed before the player continues on with the game.

== Story ==
Note: The story is from the Remake Version.

4 Months has passed since the Inspector Conflict, the Earth Sphere is once again at peace. But the increased number of terrorists that appeared throughout the world caused by the Divine Crusaders escalates, and put economic strain on the colonies which leads to some colonies in rebelling again the Earth Sphere. Brigander General Jamitov Hymem formed the group Titans to strengthen the army against the terrorists.

As Londo Bell returns from La Gaias after the events of EX, Bright Noah decides to leave his position for a while in search for Lieutenant Quarto Bajena, who went missing for unknown reasons. He parted with the Getter Team under the direction of John Kowen for his search and unravel some events happening in the current world. Things go to worse as Ondora Poseidal declared war on the surface world and even worse, the Divine Crusaders is revived by Neo Zeon Leader Haman Khan under the name Neue DC to take over the Earth Sphere.

With the war escalating, an unknown army from another galaxy called the Guests has arrived in the Earth Sphere led by the United Solar System Army Commander, Teniquette Zezenan. The reveal themselves to be part of the Zovorg Alliance which is where the Inspectors originated. With no options left, the Londo Bell must initiate Operation Final with their last fight against the Zovorg for the survival of their planet.

== Featured Series ==
- Banpresto Originals (Not a TV or movie series)
- Mobile Suit Gundam
- Mobile Suit Gundam 0080: War in the Pocket
- Mobile Suit Gundam 0083: Stardust Memory
- Mobile Suit Zeta Gundam
- Gundam Sentinel (debut) ^{a}
- Mobile Suit Gundam ZZ
- Mobile Suit Gundam: Char's Counterattack
- Mobile Suit Gundam F91
- Mobile Fighter G Gundam ^{b}
- New Mobile Report Gundam Wing ^{b}
- New Mobile Report Gundam Wing: Endless Waltz (debut) ^{b}
- Mazinger Z
- Great Mazinger
- Grendizer ^{a}
- UFO Robot Grendizer vs. Great Mazinger (debut) ^{a}
- Getter Robo
- Getter Robo G
- Shin Getter Robo (debut)
- GoShogun
- Brave Raideen ^{a}
- Chōdenji Robo Combattler V
- Invincible Steel Man Daitarn 3
- Tōshō Daimos (debut) ^{a}
- Dancouga – Super Beast Machine God (debut)
- Aura Battler Dunbine
- Heavy Metal L-Gaim (debut)
- Invincible Super Man Zambot 3 (debut) ^{a}
- Neon Genesis Evangelion (debut)^{b}
- Gunbuster (debut)^{b}
- Space Runaway Ideon (debut)^{b}
- Mazinkaiser (debut)^{b}

Notes
^a 4th only.
^b F and F Final only.

== Development ==
According to a 2021 interview with Takanobu Terada, a long-time Super Robot Wars producer, Super Robot Wars F for the Saturn was made partially to get the lucrative Evangelion license. Banpresto had been unable to acquire the license before, but Sega was a main sponsor for the show. Persistence in asking and the game being on Saturn helped ensure F was able to get the Eva rights.

According to Terada, the split of the Saturn version into F and F Final was not planned. Rather, Banpresto had a hard ship date to hit that could not be moved, but the game was the team's first experience programming for the Saturn. It became clear late in development that the game wasn't finished yet. The result was splitting the game into two, and adding a "preview" flash-forward mission of Final to F so that robots featured on the cover who did not appear in the first half of the game could appear at least somewhere in F. Despite some bugs that crept into the published versions due to the time crunch, Terada said it ultimately worked out; he said that the president of Winkysoft told him that the company would have closed and run out of money had Terada not suggested splitting the game.

On August 24, 2026, a fan translation of the Super Famicom version was released by Aeon Genesis Translations.

=== Remake ===
The game was partially remade and divided into two parts under the name Super Robot Wars F (スーパーロボット大戦F, Sūpā Robotto Taisen F) on September 25, 1997, for the Sega Saturn and on December 10, 1998, for the PlayStation. The sequel, Super Robot Wars F Final (スーパーロボット大戦F完結編, Sūpā Robotto Taisen F Kanketsu-hen) was released later on April 23, 1998, for the Sega Saturn and on April 15, 1999, for the PlayStation. The game also became available for the PlayStation Network on July 6, 2011 (4 Scramble) and November 19, 2011 (Both F and F Final).

== Influence ==
The game became a huge influence to future Super Robot Wars Games and also to some series that debuted in the game. The game itself marks the first appearance of Shin Getter Robo from the Getter Robo Go manga in any medium. The remake version also debuted the Mazinkaiser, an variant of the Mazinger Z created by Go Nagai before becoming its own series in 2001.

The storyline of 4/F/F Final has also been used in the Original Generation games, with the most notable being in 2nd Super Robot Wars Original Generation.

== Reception ==
Reception of the game is mostly positive, Famicom Tsūshin scored the Super Famicom version of the game a 31 out of 40.

According to Famitsu, Super Robot Taisen F Final for the Sega Saturn sold 498,009 units in Japan during the first half of 1998. This made it the country's ninth-best-selling game for the period. In South Korea, Game Champ ranked the Sega Saturn version first on its most-anticipated games chart in September and October 1997, after it had placed fourth in both July and August.
