= Arcadia of My Youth: Endless Orbit SSX =

1982-1983 anime series by Leiji Matsumoto

- Cover of the first volume of the Arcadia of My Youth: Endless Orbit SSX DVD volume.

わが青春のアルカディア 無限軌道SSX (Waga Seishun no Arcadia - Mugen Kido SSX)
- Created by: Leiji Matsumoto
- Anime television series
- Directed by: Tomoharu Katsumata (chief); Masamitsu Sasaki
- Produced by: Tadashi Matsushima; Yoshio Takami
- Written by: Hiroyasu Yamaura; Hiroyuki Hoshiyama
- Music by: Shunsuke Kikuchi
- Studio: Toei Animation
- Licensed by: NA: Discotek Media
- Original network: JNN (TBS)
- Original run: October 13, 1982 – March 30, 1983
- Episodes: 22
- Related works
- Arcadia of My Youth; Galaxy Express 999; Space Pirate Captain Harlock; Queen Emeraldas

Arcadia of My Youth: Endless Orbit SSX (わが青春のアルカディア·無限軌道SSX, Waga Seishun no Arukadia - Mugen Kidō Esu Esu Ekkusu) is an animated television series created by Leiji Matsumoto. It is the sequel to the 1982 animated film Arcadia of My Youth, but like many of the stories set in the Leijiverse, the continuity of the series does not necessarily agree with other Harlock series or films.

The series premiered just as the Gundam craze began in Japan. Mobile Suit Gundam ushered in a new era of more realistic sci-fi anime that made the fantasy and melodrama of Captain Harlock seemingly outdated. Therefore, the series suffered low viewer ratings and was ended after 22 episodes, half of what was originally planned.

== Plot ==
At the end of Arcadia of My Youth, Captain Harlock and the crew of the spaceship Arcadia had been banished from Earth. Earth, as well as many other planets in the universe, had been taken over by the Illumidas, a race of destructive humanoids, who ruin, enslave, and/or destroy almost any inhabitable planet they come across. In Endless Orbit SSX, Harlock battles the Illumidas while searching for a mythical "Planet of Peace", where all the peoples of the universe can live freely and without war.

It was not intended for Endless Orbit SSX to serve as a prequel to Galaxy Express 999 and the 1978 Space Pirate Captain Harlock TV series, as both Galaxy Express and SSX contradict each other, as well as the backstory given in the 1978 Space Pirate series. The 1989–1993 American comic book adaptations by Eternity Comics did, however, attempt to establish a continuity. The comic book series was not an actual adaptation of SSX, but liberally borrowed elements from the series, while introducing new ones in an attempt to establish a continuity with the Galaxy Express and Space Pirate series.

== Characters ==
Captain Harlock

The Captain is an idealistic and chivalrous man, but not prone to showing much emotion. He shares a strong bond with Tochiro Oyama, who built his ship, Arcadia. The ancestors of the two men were also friends.

Before he became a pirate, Harlock was a Captain in the Solar Federation, a human military organization. His first post at the helm of a star ship was as the Captain of the ship, Deathshadow, a ship which later would be used against him. After the Illumidas took over Earth, and his wife Maya was killed, he was eternally banished to space. Harlock became an outlaw and the captain of the Arcadia.

Harlock is a very skilled fighter and pilot. He is also quite intelligent, though most of this intelligence is displayed in combat. His combat ability was put to the test after the Deathshadow was sent after him with a computer programmed to fight just like Harlock controlling the old ship. It was one of the few times that Captain Harlock has shown his emotions so vividly, as the ship caused him to become angry and frustrated.

Voiced by: Makio Inoue

Tochiro Oyama

A small, silly looking young man with large glasses, despite his looks, Tochiro is extremely intelligent. He built the whole of the Arcadia by himself, and later inserted his mind into the ship's computer. He can generally be found on the bridge of the ship, or working in the computer room or the engine room. He loves to tinker with electronic things. In one episode Tochiro rebuilds an old radio on the ship, and then later communicates with Harlock via this radio using a second radio that builds out of parts salvaged from a destroyed Illumidas ship.

He is generally very friendly, though he is sometimes quick to anger, even with friends. He will staunchly defend his beliefs, his great friend Captain Harlock, and Emeraldas, whom he has a crush on. By contrast, when faced with enemies or a bar fight, he will remain calm, or even allow himself to be humiliated if it means either not fighting or getting the upper hand eventually.

Voiced by: Kei Tomiyama

Emeraldas

Though she only appears in a few episodes, Emeraldas had a substantial role in Arcadia of My Youth and is a major character in the Lejiverse. She is an old friend of Harlock's, and is very much like him in many ways. She has similar beliefs as him, and also fights against the Illumidas on her ship the Queen Emeraldas, but she is more solitary than Harlock, with herself being the only crew member of her ship. She does eventually fall in love with Tochiro, though she never says so outright, and he dies before a relationship can develop. This is somewhat different from the 1978 Space Pirate series where Emeraldas and Tochiro are definitely in a relationship and have a child. Also, Emeraldas became solitary only after Tochiro's death.

Emeraldas' trade mark is a single red rose, picked up as a calling card from her late ally and Harlock’s wife, Maya. She leaves one to show she is or has been at a location, and also gives them as a token of farewell.

Voiced by: Reiko Tajima

Kei Yuki

Kei is another of the Arcadia's young crew members, though she is treated with the respect of an adult by the rest of the crew. She is a kind and brave girl, who even risks her life for her crewmate Tochiro. She is also trusted by young Rebi, and brings human emotion to the often stoic bridge crew.

Kei grew up on a small space station with her father Goro, a publisher of Anti-Illumidas newspapers. Captain Herlock came to the station to find out more information about the "Treasure Island Legend". Though Goro distrusted him at first, the elder Yuki eventually sacrifices his life so that the Arcadia, with his daughter on board, can escape. He would further influence his daughter's life when it is revealed that Kei has the "Treasure Island Legend" information embedded in her sub-conscience, thanks to him. Kei Yuki also appears in the 1978 Space Pirate series but is given a different background story.

Voiced by: Yōko Asagami

La Mime

La Mime is a humanoid creature who takes the appearance of a mouthless, blank-eyed human woman. When she speaks a blue light winks on and off along with her words. She works on the bridge of the Arcadia, and rarely is seen far from her post.

Like the Captain, La Mime usually shows little emotion, but this may be because of her facial features. She feels a great sorrow for her planet, which was destroyed by the Illumidas. She was enslaved by them, though she later escaped them after helping Harlock act against them.

La Mime treasures a sea shell that is all she has of her home, Planet Allosaurus. She loves it so much that she is able to distinguish a fake that Harlock had made to tell between her and an impostor. She later gives the shell to Rebi. La Mime is similar to Mimay from the 1978 Space Pirate series in that both lack a mouth. The two characters are somewhat different in personality and ship duties, however.

Voiced by: Yuriko Yamamoto

Mr. Zone

Mr. Zone is a human who has joined the Illumidas. He has become a traitor to the human race largely thanks to his hatred of Captain Harlock. When they both were in the Solar Federation, Harlock caused Zone to lose his job as a ship designer when Harlock claimed his ship designs were unsafe. Mr. Zone's thirst for revenge caused him to join the Illumidas, who also want Captain Harlock and the Arcadia destroyed.

Later, Mr. Zone reveals a second motive - a desire to rule the universe. He secretly put together a force of humans, who help Zone take over an Illumidas ship after he acquires the Fire of St. Valkyrie, an immensely powerful force.

The character Alexander Nevich in the American 1989–1993 Eternity Comics Captain Harlock comic books is clearly based on Mr. Zone in both appearance and character.

Voiced by: Tōru Furuya

Tadashi Monono

Tadashi is the second youngest member of the crew, and like Rebi, he too is an orphan. His family died during an Illumidas invasion on his planet and the starvation that followed. He originally planned to kill Harlock and collect the sizable bounty on the Captain's head. Instead, he ends up joining Harlock's crew as their cook.

Tadashi is often hot heated and impulsive, and wants to be treated as an adult, though he is still a child. He does eventually prove himself his worth when he alone goes on a mission to destroy a computer whose mind controlling waves only affects adults. This is a totally separate character from Tadashi Daiba who is seen in the 1978 Space Pirate series. The U.S. Eternity comics adaptation has another character named Tadashi who is not only slightly younger but, unlike other versions, is written to serve as the audience surrogate.

Voiced by: Satomi Majima

Rebi

Rebi (alternately, "Revi") is a young girl whose mother is dead and whose father is a mystery to her. All she knows is that he is in space somewhere. She is adopted by Dr. Ban and later joins the crew of the Arcadia, after they save her and the doctor from an attack on the transport ship they were traveling on. Though she is too young to do any real crew work, she does help Tadashi in his duties as cook. At first she has a childish crush on the young cook, but later these two, the youngest people aboard the Arcadia, develop a good friendship.

Rebi eventually meets Capitan Bentselle, the man who is her father, but she is unaware of his true identity. Later, at Christmas time, she finally gets a chance to speak with him. He dies after sacrificing himself to save the Arcadia, leaving Rebi a true orphan.

Voiced by: Hiromi Tsuru

Capitan Bentselle

Capitan Bentselle is the father of Rebi, and was Captain of the starship Deathshadow. He originally was a patsy of the Illumidas, and was sent to destroy Captain Harlock and the Arcadia, but after inadvertently kidnapping his own daughter (as well as Dr. Ban), he became ashamed of himself and ceased combat with the Arcadia.

After sustaining great injuries which left him a cripple and needing the use of several cybernetic prostheses, he eventually reappears to save his daughter. The Deathshadow was placed under the control of a computer programmed with all of Harlock's maneuvers and Harlock could not defeat it. Bentselle, after speaking to his daughter for the last time, infiltrated the Deathshadow and destroyed it, dying in the process.

Voiced by: Yasuo Tanaka

Dr. Ban

Dr. Ban is a friendly but somewhat timid older man, who adopts young Rebi after the death of her mother. He joins the Arcadia with her, and joins the crew as the ship's doctor. He also becomes quite friendly with young Tadashi, and the three are often seen together. He stays behind to look after them on Earth as of the final episode.

In the Eternity Comics comic book series, Dr. Ban is called Dr. Zero who was the doctor character in 1978 series Space Pirate Captain Harlock. Dr. Ban and Dr. Zero are two different characters in the original Japanese series.

There is also a character named Dr. Ban in Galaxy Express 999 but the character is so different from the doctor in SSX that no relation is generally assumed between the two.

Voiced by: Jōji Yanami

Illumidas

The Illumidas are a species of humanoids who are militaristic and aggressively trying to expand their empire. Any planet that they take over becomes covered in wasteland, with most of the native inhabitants being either killed or enslaved. A few individuals from captured planets choose to work for the Illumidas, and some, like Mr. Zone, have managed to rise to a position of power in the Illumidas army.

The males are similar in appearance to human males, except they have green skin, and their hair often grows around the top and outer side of their eyes like thick eyebrows. They are identical in appearance to the inhabitants of the Comet Empire of Matsumoto's Space Battleship Yamato, though no connection is ever stated. The Illumidas are also generally the same height as humans, though there are few very short Illumidas males (there are none that are as short as men like Tochiro). No female Illumidas are ever shown, at least none that are green-skinned. Their home planet is only shown briefly, from a distance, before it is destroyed.

== Episodes ==
#	Title	Original release date
1	"Arcadia, Blast Off!" "Arukadia Hasshin" (Japanese: アルカディア発進)	October 13, 1982
A young bounty hunter is after Captain Harlock, but when they finally meet, things don't go as planned.
2	"Lady Captain Leotard" "On'na Kanchō Reotādo" (Japanese: 女艦長レオタード)	October 20, 1982
The Arcadia needs repairs, but a complicated part is needed. Tochiro knows of one man who make it, but that man lives on a planet ruled by the Illumidas.
3	"Lullaby of the Battlezone" "Sentō Kūkan no Komori Uta" (Japanese: 戦闘空間の子守唄)	October 27, 1982
The Arcadia answers a distress call sent by a ship under attack by bandits.
4	"The Cosmic Treasure Island Legend" "Uchū no Takarajima Densetsu" (Japanese: 宇宙の宝島伝説)	November 3, 1982
Searching for answers, the Arcadia visits a space station devoted to transmitting information.
5	"Girl of the Ghost Ship "Sell"" "Yūreibune Seru no Shōjo" (Japanese: 幽霊船セルの少女)	November 10, 1982
A cyborg found on a derelict ship is taken aboard the Arcadia, but crew's pity on the girl could be their undoing.
6	"It Appears! The Great Space Fortress" "Tōjō! Uchū Dai Yōsai" (Japanese: 登場!宇宙大要塞)	November 17, 1982
The Arcadia is badly damaged and Tochiro is ill.
7	"X=Emeraldas" "X=Emerarudasu" (Japanese: X=エメラルダス)	December 1, 1982
Emeraldas has an unpleasant reminder of how she got her scar.
8	"Mother and Son of the Steel Planet" "Tetsu no Hoshi no Shōnen to Haha" (Japanese: 鉄の星の少年と母)	December 8, 1982
After a trip to a planet covered in water, an explosion causes the full water tanks of the Arcadia to empty, forcing them to make an emergency landing on a planet made of metal.
9	"Who's the Spy?" "Supai wa Dare da!" (Japanese: スパイはだれだ!)	December 15, 1982
An act of sabotage has damaged the Arcadia, and Kei has gone missing.
10	"Snowfall in the Sea of Stars" "Hosho no Umi ni Yuki ga Furu" (Japanese: 星の海に雪が降る)	December 22, 1982
It's Christmas and all little Rebi wishes is to see her father again.
11	"The Sound of Freedom's Bell Rings Out" "Hibike Jiyū no Kane no Ne" (Japanese: 響け自由の鐘の音)	January 5, 1983
The crew of the Arcadia try to take much needed shore leave on a neutral planet. They are forced to leave because of the Illumidas' treacherous and destructive ways.
12	"The Heart's Control, the Heart's Vessel" "Kokoro de Ayatsuru·Kokoro no Fune" (Japanese: 心で操る·心の船)	January 12, 1983
Mr. Zone has built a ship that he is sure will destroy the Arcadia once and for all.
13	"Riddle of the Golden Goddess" "Nazo no Kogane Joshinzō!?" (Japanese: 謎の黄金女神像!?)	January 19, 1983
The Arcadia encounters a strange golden ball of light that leaves La Mime terrified.
14	"Riddle of the Glowing UFO" "Nazo no Hikari wa UFO?" (Japanese: 謎の光はUFO?)	January 26, 1983
The glowing golden ball continues to be a mystery, and Mr. Zone gains an armada.
15	"Eighty Minutes in the Sea of Death" "Shi no Kaichū 80-bu!?" (Japanese: 死の海中80分!?)	February 2, 1983
The Arcadia, again badly damaged, is forced to hide in the waters of an ocean planet where the pressure is so great it will implode the ship if they don't repair it in time.
16	"The Cat Taken Aboard in Space" "Uchū de Hirotta Neko" (Japanese: 宇宙で拾ったネコ)	February 9, 1983
Rebi sneaks a cat on board, an act which threatens to doom the whole ship.
17	"The Great Sandstorm: Communication Impossible" "Dai Tatsumaki!! Kōshin Funō" (Japanese: 大竜巻!! 交信不能)	February 16, 1983
Rebi's cat breaks Tochiro's radio, sending him storming off the ship. Rebi, Tadashi and Dr. Ban go after him, and soon all four of them are stranded on a dangerous planet.
18	"The Deliverance of Emeraldas" "Emerarudasu Kyūshutsu" (Japanese: エメラルダス救出)	February 23, 1983
Emeraldas has been surrounded by the Illumidas, and the only way to get the Arcadia there in time is through a dangerously radioactive part of space.
19	"The Mystery of Planet Maicon" "Maikon Wakusei no Kai" (Japanese: マイコン惑星の怪)	March 2, 1983
Mr. Zone tricks Captain Herlock into the deadly grasp of a mad and murderous computer.
20	"The Gate of Arcadia: Will it Open?" "Hiraku ka!! Arukadia no Mon ga..." (Japanese: 闘くか!! アルカディアの門が...)	March 9, 1983
Tochiro is ill, but Dr. Ban doesn't have the right chemical to test how ill the little man is. Kei risks travelling to an Illumidas-controlled station to get it.
21	"Fight on, Tochiro, Until Life's End" "Tatakae Toichirō!! Inochi Hateru made..." (Japanese: 闘えトチロー!!命果てるまで...)	March 16, 1983
Captain Harlock is finally in sight of his goal.
22	"Return to the Mother World Earth: Be Eternal, Cosmic Hero" "Hahanaru Chikyū e!! Uchū no Yūsha yo Eien ni..." (Japanese: 母なる地球へ!!宇宙の勇者よ永遠に...)	March 30, 1983
Both Harlock and Mr. Zone have been given the Fire of St. Aqule, and one of them will triumph.
