= Ai Orikasa =

Japanese actress and singer (born 1963)

- 折笠 愛
- Born: Kikue Orikasa (折笠 きく江); 12 December 1963 (age 62); Tokyo, Japan
- Other name: Orion (オリオン)
- Occupations: Actress; voice actress; singer
- Years active: 1980–present
- Agent: Axlone
- Known for: Kyatto Ninden Teyandee as Pururun; Tenchi Muyo! as Ryoko; Sakura Wars as Ayame Fujieda/Kaede Fujieda; Mobile Suit Gundam Wing as Quatre Raberba Winner; One Piece as Kozuki Momonosuke
- Height: 154 cm (5 ft 1 in)
- Website: orikasa.chu.jp

Ai Orikasa (折笠 愛, Orikasa Ai; born Kikue Orikasa (折笠 きく江, Orikasa Kikue) on December 12, 1963) is a Japanese actress, voice actress, and singer.

She has portrayed a variety of characters, from young girls to women and boys. In her leading roles, she often voiced boys and mothers, famously Hagu-Hagu in Haō Taikei Ryū Knight and Shizuka's mother Michiko Minamoto in Doraemon. She also provided the Japanese dubbing voice for Jessica Rabbit in Who Framed Roger Rabbit.

== Biography ==
Orikasa is from Tokyo, Japan. After moving on from high school in 1982, she graduated from the drama department of the Nihon Denshikōgakuin College, now Nihon Kogakuin College. After performing on stage as an actress with the Bungeiza Theater Company and the Sōhen Theater Company, she participated in an audition for the TV series Little Lord Fauntleroy out of a desire to broaden her work. After several rounds of auditions, she made her debut as a voice actress in 1988, playing the main character, Cedie. According to Orikasa, Minami Takayama and Megumi Hayashibara were the other finalists in the audition for the role of Cedie, and she was chosen for the role of Cedie because of her innocence rather than her acting ability.

Her stage name, "Ai Orikasa," implies her wish to be loved by everyone. The staff came up with her stage name after going to the restroom while thinking of it.

Early on, she appeared in many works of Nippon Animation. Especially in the World Masterpiece Theater, she was among the frequently appearing voice actors such as Kazue Ikura, Ginga Banjō, and Ken'ichi Ogata, alongside the "three major voice actors" Mitsuko Horie, Eiko Yamada, and Keiko Han.

Of all the characters she has played in anime, she cites Ryōko from the Tenchi Muyo! series as her most memorable character. She has also dubbed for dramas, movies, and animation produced overseas, and has been active as a singer.

At the end of September 2011, it was announced that she had left Production Baobab, where she had belonged for many years since her debut, and moved to Axlone, Toshiyuki Morikawa's agency.

== Filmography ==
=== Television animation ===
1988

- Little Lord Fauntleroy (Cedric Errol (Cedie))
- Mister Ajikko (Maurice)

1989

- Madō King Granzort (Kabbi(ep 16), Musa (ep 36))
- Aoi Blink (Julie)
- Time Travel Tondekeman (Arthur, June, Andre)
- Jungle Book: Boy Mowgli (Lala)
- Momotaro Densetsu (Pochi's Dog, Otohime)
- Wrestler Gundan Seisenshi Robin Jr. (Mashi Raimeru)

1990

- Idol Angel Yokoso Yoko (Nagai Maria)
- Chibi Maruko-chan (Maruo's Mother, Hamaji, Mari Uesugi)
- Kyatto Ninden Teyandee (Pururun)
- Tenku Senki Shurato (Matsuri)
- Mashin Eiyuden Wataru 2 (Arukidemesu)
- Knights of Ramune & 40 (Tereyan, Cham)
- Karasu Tengu Kabuto (Kurosaten)
- Edokko Boy: Gatten Taro (Oryu)
- Pygmalio (Kurt)

1991

- Ore wa Chokkaku (Jun)
- Jankenman (Jankenman)
- Moero! Top Striker (Mario Santis, Sophia Ruggiero)
- Yokoyama Mitsuteru Sangokushi (Diaochan, Emperor Xian of Han (Young))
- Marude Dameo (Tonma, Catherine, Sayuri)

1992

- Oniisama E... (Shinobu Hikawa's Lover)
- Flower Witch Mary Bell (Ken)
- Genki Bakuhatsu Ganbaruger (Koutarou Kirigakure)
- Tenchi Muyo! (Ryoko)
- Tetsujin 28-go FX (Yoko)
- Ashita e Free Kick (Morita Mirei)
- Yu Yu Hakusho (Koto, Shizuru Kuwabara)

1993

- Mobile Suit Victory Gundam (Fuala Glifon, Ness Husher)
- Heisei Inu Monogatari Bow (Butcher's Wife)

1994

- Lord of Lords Ryu Knight (Hagu Hagu)
- Yamato Takeru (Kushinaga)
- Crayon Shin-chan (Akemi Matsuda)
- Metal Fighter Miku (Ginko)
- Blue Seed (Ryoko Takeuchi)
- Captain Tsubasa J (Kazuo Tachibana)

1995

- Romeo and the Black Brothers (Romeo)
- Kyōryū Bōkenki Jura Tripper (Ajari)
- Juu Senshi Garukiba (Ryuto)
- Mobile Suit Gundam Wing (Quatre Raberba Winner)
- Mojako (Sorao Amano)
- Tenchi Universe (Ryoko)

1996

- B'tX (Miisha)
- Saber Marionette J (Baikou)

1997

- Shin Tenchi Muyo (Ryoko)
- Maze (Solude "Whirlwind" Schfoltzer)
- Revolutionary Girl Utena (Kanae Ōtori)
- Kindaichi Shounen no Jikenbo (Seiko Kayama (ep 4–6), Yurie Kazekura (ep 16–17), Yuko Wakabayashi (ep 115))
- Battle Athletes Victory (Yumiko Karashima)
- Virus Buster Serge (Donna Dorado)
- Gall Force: Revolution (Pfizer)

1998

- Nessa no Haou Gandalla (Yang Mimei)
- Momoiro Sisters (Sakura Murakami)
- PopoloCrois Monogatari (Pietro)
- St. Luminous Mission High School (Tadeku Umi)
- Saber Marionette J to X (Baiko)
- Super Yo-Yo (Inseto Hojo)

1999

- Steel Angel Kurumi (Dr. Reiko Amagi)

2000

- Gensomaden Saiyuki (Linchei)
- Sakura Wars (Ayame Fujieda)
- Vandread (Meia's Oma)
- Gravitation (Tohma Seguchi)

2001

- Bakuten Shoot Beyblade (Max Mizuhara)
- Vandread: The Second Stage (Meia's Oma)
- Captain Tsubasa: Road to 2002 (Jun Misugi (Young))

2002

- Mirage of Blaze (Yukio Takeda)
- Bakuten Shoot Beyblade 2002 (Max Mizuhara)
- Tenchi Muyo! GXP (Ryoko)
- Kiddy Grade (Timothy Constance)

2003

- Inuyasha (Jakotsu)
- Ghost in the Shell: Stand Alone Complex (Sanou)
- Bakuten Shoot Beyblade G Revolution (Max)
- Rumiko Takahashi Anthology (Matsuko Kogure)
- Planetes (Fee Carmichael)
- Mermaid Forest (Isago)

2004

- Windy Tales (Kaito)
- Futakoi (Miyabi Hinagiku)
- Black Jack (Debit)

2005

- Sgt. Frog (Sylvie)
- Gallery Fake (Marian)
- Kaiketsu Zorori (Angel)
- Doraemon (Michiko Minamoto)
- Kouchuu Ouja Mushiking: Mori no Tami no Densetsu (Kidamu)
- Moeyo Ken (Yuuko Kondou)
- Boku no Bokugo (Narrator)

2006

- Hell Girl (Aki Abe)
- Demonbane (Nya)
- Detective Conan (Mitsuhiko Tsuburaya) (Episodes 425–436)
- Silk Road Kids (Yuto)
- Oban Star-Racers (Nin)
- Super Robot Wars OG: Divine Wars (Shiro)
- KenIchi the Mightiest Disciple (Saori Shirahama)

2007

- Touka Gettan (Landlady)
- Kono Aozora ni Yakusoku o (Naoko Asakura)
- Claymore (Galatea)
- Toward the Terra (Mother Computer)
- Blue Drop (Azanael)
- You're Under Arrest: Full Throttle (Fortune Teller)
- Ryūsei no Rockman Tribe (Orihime)

2008

- Porfy no Nagai Tabi (Michael Balbattsua)
- Penguin no Mondai (Kurisu Yamaguchi)
- Kaiba (Moka)
- The Telepathy Girl Ran (Junpei Tokita)
- Koihime Musou (Kashin)
- Noramimi 2 (Furiotto)

2009

- Casshern Sins (Hoto)
- The Sacred Blacksmith (Lucy)
- Kaidan Restaurant (Girl in the White House)

2010

- Nura: Rise of the Yokai Clan (Hari Onna)
- Shiki (Chizuru Kirishiki)
- Super Robot Wars OG: The Inspector (Mai Kobayashi, Shiro)

2011

- Dog Days (Mother Fox Spirit)
- A-Channel (Tōru's mother)
- Sket Dance (Boy (ep 18))
- Maria Holic Alive (Mariya Irene)
- C3 (Zenon Hōjō)

2012

- Natsume's Book of Friends (Amana)
- Senki Zesshō Symphogear (Flower's Aunt)
- Saint Seiya Omega (Peacock Pavlin)
- Tanken Driland (Lasetsu)
- My Little Monster (Kyoko Misawa)

2013

- Monogatari Series Second Season (Araragi's Mother)
- One Piece (Kozuki Momonosuke (Young))

2014

- PriPara (Mirei's Mother)
- Wasimo (Mom)

2015

- Blood Blockade Battlefront (K.K.)

2017

- Tsugumomo (Honoka)

2020

- Fruits Basket: 2nd Season (Ren Sōma)

2021

- Fruits Basket: The Final (Ren Sōma)

=== Original net animation (ONA) ===
- Bullet/Bullet (2025) as Qu-0213 Ei-baba, Dinner

=== Original video animation (OVA) ===
- Tenchi Muyo! Ryo-Ohki (1992) as Ryoko/Zero
- Domain of Murder (1992) as Ranko Yotawara
- Tenchi Muyo! Mihoshi Special (1994) as Ryoko
- 801 T.T.S. Airbats (1994) as Arisa Mitaka
- Battle Skipper (1995) as Sayaka Kitaouji
- Magical Girl Pretty Sammy (1995) as Ryoko Orikasa
- Miyuki-chan in Wonderland (1995) as Cheshire Cat
- Blue Seed Beyond (1996) as Ryoko Takeuchi
- Gall Force: The Revolution (1996) as Pfizer
- Variable Geo (1996) as Jun Kubota
- Mobile Suit Gundam Wing: Endless Waltz (1997) as Quatre Raberba Winner
- Mobile Suit Gundam Wing: Operation Meteor (1997) as Quatre Raberba Winner
- Fire Emblem (1997) as Mars (young)
- Saber Marionette J Again (1997) as Baiko
- Sakura Wars (1997) as Ayame Fujieda
- Gravitation: Lyrics of Love (1999) as Tohma Seguchi
- Angel Sanctuary (2000) as Alexiel
- Street Fighter Alpha: The Animation (2000) as Rose
- Sakura Wars: Sumire (2002) as Kaede Fujieda
- Kidou Shinsengumi Moeyo Ken (2003) as Yuuko Kondou
- Phantom - The Animation (2004) as Lizzie Garland
- Saikano: Another Love Song (2005) as Mizuki
- Super Robot Wars Original Generation: The Animation (2005) as Shiro and Mai Kobayashi/Levi Tolar
- Tales of Symphonia: The Animation (2007) as Genius Sage

=== Films ===
- Floral Magician Mary Bell: The Key of Phoenix (1992) – Ken
- Tenchi the Movie: Tenchi Muyo in Love (1996) – Ryoko
- Tenchi the Movie 2: The Daughter of Darkness (1997) – Ryoko
- Mobile Suit Gundam Wing: Endless Waltz ~Special Edition~ (1998) – Quatre Raberba Winner
- Tenchi Forever! The Movie (1999) – Ryoko
- Doraemon: Nobita and the Winged Braves (2001) – Gusuke's adoptive mother
- Sakura Wars: The Movie (2001) – Kaede Fujieda
- Beyblade: The Movie (2002) – Max Mizuhara
- Detective Conan: The Phantom of Baker Street (2002) – Hiroki Sawada
- One Piece: Chopper's Kingdom on the Island of Strange Animals (2002) – Momabi
- Detective Conan: The Private Eyes' Requiem (2006) – Mitsuhiko Tsuburaya
- Stand by Me Doraemon 2 (2020) – Michiko Minamoto
- Doraemon: Nobita's Little Star Wars 2021 (2022) – Michiko Minamoto

=== Tokusatsu ===
- Garo (2005) as Madou Necklace Silva
- Zyuden Sentai Kyoryuger (2013-2014) as Funfilled Spy Luckyulo (eps. 1 - 34, 36 - 48) (voice)/old lady disguise (ep. 40) (actor)
- Zyuden Sentai Kyoryuger: Gaburincho of Music (2013) as Luckyulo
- Zyuden Sentai Kyoryuger vs. Go-Busters: The Great Dinosaur Battle! Farewell Our Eternal Friends (2014) as Luckyulo
- Zyuden Sentai Kyoryuger Returns: Hundred Years After (2014) as Apprentice Wise Goddess Luckyuro
- Zero: Black Blood (2014) as Madou Necklace Silva
- Ressha Sentai ToQger vs. Kyoryuger: The Movie (2015) as Luckyulo
- Power Rangers Dino Force Brave (2017) as Funfilled Spy Luckyulo
- Zero: Dragon Blood (2017) as Madou Necklace Silva
- Zyuden Sentai Kyoryuger 「Brave 33.5: This is Brave! Battle Frontier」 (2018) as Funfilled Spy Luckyulo

=== Drama CDs ===
- Kami-Kaze (????) as Kaede
- Mobile Suit Gundam Wing: Blind Target (????) as Quatre Raberba Winner

=== Video games ===
- Astal (1995) as Astal
- Magical Drop F (1995) as Empress and Strength Jr.
- Super Robot Taisen 4S (1995) as Shiro
- Arc the Lad II (1996) as Elc
- Mega Man 8/Rockman 8 (1996) as Rockman (Mega Man)
- Sakura Wars (1996) as Ayame Fujieda
- Other Life: Azure Dreams (1997) as Nico Southey
- Sakura Wars Hanagumi Taisen Columns (1997) as Ayame Fujieda
- Sakura Wars Steam Radio Show (1997) as Ayame Fujieda
- Super Robot Wars F (1997) as Shiro
- Bulk Slash (1997) as Naira Savage
- Daraku Tenshi - The Fallen Angels (1998) as Musuashu (Yuiren)
- Sakura Wars Teigeki Graph (1998) as Ayame Fujieda/Kaede Fujieda
- Sakura Wars 2 (1998) as Kaede Fujieda
- Super Robot Wars Final (1998) as Shiro
- Super Adventure Rockman (1998) as Rockman (Mega Man)
- Super Robot Taisen Complete Box (1999) as Shiro
- Arc the Lad III (1999) as Elc
- Valkyrie Profile (1999) as Aimee, Genevieve, Clair, Miriya, J.D. Warris
- Phantom of Inferno (2000) as Lizzie Garland
- PopoloCrois Story II (2000) as Prince Pietro
- Sakura Wars Hanagumi Taisen Columns 2 (2000) as Kaede Fujieda
- Super Robot Taisen Alpha (2000) as Shiro and Levi Tolar, Quatre Raberba Winner
- Project Justice (2000) as Zaki
- Sakura Wars 3 (2001) as Kaede Fujieda
- Sakura Wars 4 (2002) as Kaede Fujieda
- Tokimeki Memorial Girl's Side (2002) as Tsukushi
- Cyber Troopers Virtual-On Marz (2003) as Silvie and SHBVD Sergeanr Leddon
- Sakura Wars: To My Heated Blood (2003) as Ayame Fujieda
- Tales of Symphonia (2003) as Genis Sage
- Rumble Roses (2005) as Anesthesia/Dr. Anesthesia
- Namco x Capcom (2005) as Saya and Kyuujuukyuu
- PopoloCrois Story: Adventure of Prince Pietro (2005) as Prince Pietro
- Sharin no Kuni, Yuukyuu no Shonenshojo (2005) as Ari Ruruliant Houzuki
- 3rd Super Robot Wars Alpha: To the End of the Galaxy (2005) as Mai Kobayashi, Quatre Raberba Winner
- Another Century's Episode 2 (2006) as Quatre Raberba Winner
- Valkyrie Profile: Lenneth (2006) as Aimee, Genevieve, Clair, Miriya, J.D. Warris
- Rumble Roses XX (2006) as Anesthesia/Dr. Anesthesia
- Super Robot Wars: Original Generations (2007) as Shiro and Mai Kobayashi/Levi Tolar
- Super Robot Wars OG Gaiden (2007) as Shiro and Mai Kobayashi
- Super Robot Wars OG Saga: Endless Frontier (2008) as Saya
- Suikoden Tierkreis (2008) as Shams
- Super Robot Wars OG Saga: Endless Frontier EXCEED (2010) as Saya
- Super Robot Wars Z/2 (2011) as Quatre Raberba Winner
- Project X Zone (2012) as Ayame and Saya
- Project X Zone 2 (2015) as Ayame, Saya, Tarosuke
- Return to PopoloCrois: A Story of Seasons Fairytale (2015) as Prince Pietro
- Final Fantasy XIV: Heavensward (2015) as Igeyorhm
- Granblue Fantasy (2014) as Lady Grey
- Fire Emblem Heroes (2017) as Ayra
- PopoloCrois Story Narcia's Tears and the Fairy's Flute (2018) as Prince Pietro
- Dissidia Final Fantasy Opera Omnia (2018) as Freya Crescent
- Sin Chronicle (2021) as Violet
- Kyatto Ninden Teyandee (2027) as Pururun

=== Dubbing ===
==== Live-action ====
- Absentia as Julianne Gunnarsen (Natasha Little)
- The Adventures of Greyfriars Bobby as Ewan Adams (Oliver Golding)
- Captain America as Bernice Stewart / Sharon (Kim Gillingham)
- Falling Down as Adele Trevino (Joey Hope Singer)
- Godsend as Adam Duncan (Cameron Bright)
- The Good Son as Henry Evans (Macaulay Culkin)
- Home Alone as Kevin McCallister (Macaulay Culkin)
- Hostage as Tommy Smith (Jimmy Bennett)
- Jingle All The Way (2000 Fuji TV edition) as Jamie Langston (Jake Lloyd)
- Marley & Me: The Puppy Years as Marley (Grayson Russell)
- The Nutty Professor as Carla Purty (Jada Pinkett)
- The Poseidon Adventure as Susan Shelby (Pamela Sue Martin)
- Power Rangers in Space as Astronema (Melody Perkins)
- Power Rangers Lost Galaxy as Karone/Pink Ranger (Melody Perkins)
- RoboCop 2 as Hob (Gabriel Damon)
- Sleepless in Seattle as Jonah Baldwin (Ross Malinger)
- The Sound of Music (50th Anniversary edition) as Sister Agatha (Doreen Tryden)

==== Animation ====
- Aladdin as Whahido
- Batman: The Animated Series as Dick Grayson/Robin (young)
- Darkwing Duck as Honker Muddlefoot
- Widget (Widget, additional voices)
- Mr. Bogus as Brattus, additional voices
- Rugrats as Tommy Pickles

== Selected discography ==
- Shukujo Choutokkyu [淑女超特級]
- Moonlight Café
- Room Service
- Mitsumete [みつめて]
- I
- Truth
- LeTTer
- BREATH
- Popolocrois Monogatari
