= List of Samurai Pizza Cats characters =

This is the list of characters appearing in the anime series Samurai Pizza Cats and its original Japanese counterpart Kyatto Ninden Teyandee.

== Main characters ==
Yattarō (ヤッ太郎) / Speedy Cerviche
Voiced by: Kappei Yamaguchi (Japanese), Rick Jones (English)
Speedy is the leader of the Pizza Cats. As his name implies, he is nimble and fast on his toes, a trait which comes in handy both when delivering pizzas and when fighting crime. He wields the magical Ginzu sword (Masamasa), whose power is unleashed in almost every episode as Speedy's special attack, the Cat's Eye Slash.
Speedy is very self-confident and loves to pose for the camera after each victory. He has a witty and sharp sense of humor, but remains very committed to his duties. He has green eyes and wears white armor. Speedy has a crush on Lucille and, later, Polly towards the final episodes.
There has been controversy over the spelling of his English name. Initially, it was thought that Speedy's surname was spelled "Service" ("service" pronounced with Italian phonics sounds like "ser-vee-chay," making the name "Speedy Service" a tidy pun) which came from the Saban Powerhouse stories published by Acclaim Comics. However, most official packaging (such as the VHS box for the movie) spells his name "Cerviche," making it the de facto spelling. Ceviche (also spelled as "cebiche" or "seviche") is actually a seafood dish prepared not by cooking but by using citrus to treat the meat.
Pururun (プルルン) / Polly Esther
Voiced by: Ai Orikasa (Japanese), Sonja Ball (English)
Polly is the only female on the team. Although Speedy is the leader, Polly does her fair share of bossing her teammates around. She has a dynamic, independent personality, but a dangerously short and violent temper. Polly battles evil with the power of love: she plays a flute when going into battle, her projectile weapons are heart-shaped, she has a sword with hearts on the handle (Kirakira) with Heart Breaker as the hidden power of it, additionally by raising her forearms and making a beckoning gesture with her hands, she can generate a gravity field that pulls her opponents into the range of her razor-sharp claws. She has blue eyes and wears red and pink armor. While Guido and Speedy never remove most of their armor, even at work, Polly removes her armor on two occasions, during which she is shown with short red hair and a hairband upon which her ears sit. Polly has romantic feelings for Speedy, previously seen as a love/hate relationship earlier in the show, which appeared during the final episodes.
Her English name is a play on the word polyester.
Sukashī (スカシー) / Guido Anchovy
Voiced by: Jūrōta Kosugi (Japanese), Terrence Scammell (English)
Guido is the resident cool dude and most relaxed member of the group. Tall, dark-furred, and a smooth talker, he is often seen chasing after girls, although he has little success in romance. Guido's weapon of choice is the Samurai Sunspot Umbrella, which can fire rings or a heat beam, be spun to hypnotize enemies, and be used as a club (when closed) or a shield (when open). Its handle conceals Guido's sword (Pikapika), whose power is Ichimonji´s Fire. He has red eyes and wears blue armor.
His English name is a reference to the anchovy fish, and Guido is a common Italian given name, and is also used as a slang term for a young, male Italian-American in New York.
Older promotional materials spelled Guido's last name as Anchovi. However, Anchovy has since become the official spelling such as Madman Entertainment's DVD release. His last name was also spelled as Anchovie in the Saban Powerhouse comics.

== Allies ==
Otama (おタマ) / Francine
Voiced by: Satomi Kōrogi (Japanese), Pauline Little (English)
Francine is the feline owner of the Pizza Cat Restaurant and the team's operator. She does not actively participate in missions, but still plays a vital role. Wherever the team are needed, either to deliver a pizza or to battle evil, she operates the launching cannon (in a parody of the live-action Japanese film Cyber Ninja) which blasts the heroes in the air toward their destination. She also handles communications and finances. Francine is known in the English language version for speaking in rhyme.
Various sources (including the IMDb) often list Francine's surname as being Manx, but her last name is never actually given in the show. Manx — referring to a breed of cat — was improvised by a fan, and has since been widely adopted as fanon.
Narrator
Voiced by: Kenyu Horiuchi (Japanese), Terrence Scammell (English)
Always unseen in the English version and only seen once in the Japanese version, the Narrator provides voiceover for the episodes and interacts with the characters. He often makes witty or sarcastic comments, many of which spoof plot holes and clichés, and even reads the wrong narration in one episode of the US version. Occasionally, in the US version, some of his lines are changed, and a different, more "politically correct" Narrator takes over. For instance, the original Narrator's line, broadcast in Canada, was: "And so, thanks to the tireless efforts of the Samurai Pizza Cats, movie-goers around the world can thrill to yet another pointless display of senseless violence and meaningless destruction!" while the US version used the PC Narrator's voice and was changed to: "movie-goers around the world can thrill to yet another heroic display of untamed bravery and never-ending action!"
Otasuke Ninja (お助けメンバー, Otasuke menbā) / The Rescue Team
Rikinoshin/General Catton Voiced By: Kiyoyuki Yanada (Japanese), Michael Rudder (English)
Mietoru/Bat Cat Voiced By: Tsutomu Kashiwakura (Japanese), Richard Dumont (English)
Gotton/Meowzma Voiced By: Wataru Takagi (Japanese), Mark Hellman (English)
Nekkii/Spritz Voiced By: Takehito Koyasu (Japanese), Arthur Holden (English)
Whenever the Cats are in serious trouble, they ring the bell on their collars, alerting Otama to call part or all of the Otasuke Ninja Team into action. Ironically, one lone member of the Otasuke Ninja is usually able to accomplish what the three front-line heroes could not. The Otasuke Ninja Team comprises four more cats, each with a different ability based on one of the four elements:

Rikinoshin (リキノシン) / General Catton: Catton has a pair of flamethrowing cannons on his back. He is the leader of the Rescue Team. He generally speaks in clichés ("I have not yet begun to fight! You ain't seen nothin' yet!") and he is a play on real life's General Patton.
Mietoru (ミエトル) / Bat Cat: Bat Cat uses a wing and propeller device to become airborne. His English name is most likely a play on Batman, though he does not resemble the character.
Gotton (ゴットン, Gotton) / Meowzma O' Tool: Meowzma is another member of the Rescue Team who uses drills on his gloves, helmet, and tail that allow him to burrow under the earth.
Nekkii (ネッキ, Nekkī) / Spritz T. Cat: Unlike most cats, Spritz loves the water. He is bravest of the group. He uses high pressure water jets. The "T." in his English name stands for "the". His name is a play on Fritz the Cat, a comic book character created by Robert Crumb.

The Rescue Team demonstrates some Super Sentai-like abilities: the members can combine their powers by joining their backpacks into unlikely weapons. Spritz and Catton create an acid-shooting machine gun, and Bat Cat and Meowzma create what was referred to once in the English series as the "singing robot wrecking rotor," which fires an electrified vortex. Finally, all four members can combine their equipment into a larger energy cannon (the "Super-Duper Wonder Weapon") that must be supported by the whole team and fires a blast nearly equivalent to that of the Ginzu sword.
At one point, after being summoned over and over to pull them out of jams, the Rescue Team lost their respect for the Pizza Cats, demanding to replace them as the primary team. They were successful, although when summoned to their first battle, they failed miserably, and were soon rescued by the original team. Humbled, the Rescue Team surrendered their positions back to the Pizza Cats and promise not to interfere with the original team again.
Omitsu (おミツ) / Lucille
Voiced by: Yuko Mizutani (Japanese), Susan Glover (English)
Omitsu (or Omi-chan (おみっちゃん)) is a sheep animaloid and owner of a tea house, Lucille is the main object of both Speedy and Guido's affections, and a primary cause of conflict between them. Her hairstyle and shoulder pads conceal a number of homing missiles, which are launched in Itano Circus fashion whenever she gets overly-emotional. She has an older brother named Wally, who works as a sushi chef.
Her Japanese name, Omitsu, may be a reference to the character Omitsu from Ganbare Goemon, with whom she shares many similarities, such as her occupation and relationship to the main characters. Despite being female, she possesses ram-like horns. In KNT, she is ignorantly selfish, rarely paying attention to whatever fails to hold her attention, while in SPC she is more dim-witted instead.
Inuyama Wankō-no-Kami (犬山ワンコー守) / Big Al Dente
Voiced by: Kōzō Shioya (Japanese), A.J. Henderson (English)
Big Al Dente is the chief of the Palace Guard and also the boss of the Pizza Cats, who assigns their missions. His English name is a reference to the al dente pasta cooking method. Being a dog, he sometimes falls to his feral side, breaking out in furious barking, especially when frustrated by the Pizza Cats. While his dog breed is not known in "KNT"; he is stated to be a St. Bernard according to a press release.
Tokugawa Iei Iei (徳川イエッイエッ) / Emperor Fred
Voiced by: Kenyuu Horiuchi (Japanese), Mark Hellman (English)
The ruler of Little Tokyo, Fred does not hold any real power because he is insane and tends to act like a scat singer (according to one of the other characters, he lost his sanity after having his wisdom teeth removed). His usual utterance is simply his name ("Fuh-RED!"), and on some occasions he takes to scat singing. However, he does speak coherently in at least four episodes. He is married, but his wife only appears in the episode "Princess Vi's Hippy Dippy Mom" when she comes home from traveling the world; she also has a cameo in the last episode "The Big Comet Caper".
Tokugawa Usako (徳川ウサコ) / Princess "Vi" Violet
Voiced by: Maria Kawamura (Japanese), Liz MacRae (English)
Princess Vi is the young rabbit daughter of Fred, and unofficial ruler of Little Tokyo. She is rather spoiled, selfish, petty, and temperamental. She has a tendency to banish all who displease her to Prisoner Island (which unknown to her is actually a tropical paradise) or, later, Extras Island when the former is overcrowded. Vi is devoted to her absent mother, and they have a very unusual family dynamic—they try to beat each other up when they first re-unite. She also seems to have a crush on Bad Bird and wants to marry him instantly, however Bad Bird has his own reasons by running away from her. In the series, she fails to marry him three times (Field of Screwballs, All You Need Is Love, and Princess Vi's Happy Dippy Mom). Her English name is a reference to Princess Di, whilst her Japanese name is likely a contraction of "Usagi-ko", or "bunny child", combined with a reference to the Tokugawa Shogunate, who ruled Japan from 1603 to 1867.
Nekomata Reikainosuke (猫股霊界之介) / Guru Lou
Voiced by: Kenichi Ogata (Japanese), Walter Massey (English)
Guru Lou (sometimes called Daisensei (大先生)) is an old cat who lives alone in the mountains outside Little Tokyo. Whenever the Pizza Cats are in great trouble, they seek his advice, however reluctant he may be to give it. Although he is a certified genius, nothing he invents is truly useful, and he is not above taking credit for other's accomplishments. Through his own ineptitude, he helped then unlock the power of the Supreme Catatonic. In KNT, Nekomata is highly lecherous, and will take every opportunity to fondle the nearest female he can find, which typically results in him receiving a harsh beating, as well as a heavy drinker.
Okara (おカラ) / Carla
Voiced by: Chieko Honda (Japanese), Eramelinda Boquer (English)
Carla is a crow and Bad Bird's childhood sweetheart; she loved him as a child, and still has feelings for him. She has orange hair and wears red ribbons in it. She works as a clown in the local circus. In KNT, Okara speaks in a heavy country accent.
Itsumono Oya (伊津茂乃母) / Mother / Momma Mutt
Itsumono Ko (伊津茂乃子) / Junior
Itsumono Oya Voiced By: Yuko Mizutani (Japanese), Jane Woods (English)
Itsumono Ko Voiced By: Ai Orikasa (Satomi Koorogi in first episode) (Japanese), Bronwen Mantel (English)
A small but constant part of the show, this canine mother and her son appear to make a silly comment every time the Cats blast off on a mission. They can be surprisingly sharp-tongued, making social criticism toward both their own world and the real world. In KNT, they are tanuki instead of dogs. When the group traveled to the past, Junior's grandmother was shown to be very similar to him.
Himitsu Ninjatai Yankii (秘密忍者隊ヤンキー) / The New York Pizza Cats
Michael Voiced By: Ryo Horikawa (Japanese), Pier Paquette (credited as Pier Kohl) (English)
Madonna Voiced By: Hiromi Tsuru (Japanese), Jane Woods (English)
Prince Voiced By: Sho Hayami (Japanese), Michael Rudder (English)
Little Tokyo is not the only city under the protection of a Pizza Cat team. Episode 38, "A Mission in Manhattan", involved the Samurai Pizza Cats traveling to New York City and meeting their American counterparts:

Michael (マイケル, Maikeru) / The Sundance Kid: The shortest of the New York Cats, he uses twin six-shooters called Nyan Nyan Magnum against his adversaries with pinpoint accuracy.
Madonna (マドンナ, Madon'na) / Deedee: A tall and curvaceous she-cat who uses a whip to punish the bad guys.
Prince (プリンス, Purinsu) / Cosmo: Like Deedee, he is taller than the Samurai Pizza Cats, and is suave and agile. He uses a rapier in combat.

== Villains ==
Kitsunezuka Ko'on-no-Kami (狐塚コーン守) / Seymour "The Big" Cheese
Voiced by: Ikuya Sawaki (Japanese), Dean Hagopian (English)
Seymour "The Big" Cheese is the prime minister of Little Tokyo. He is the prime antagonist of Little Tokyo, and the Supreme Commander of the Ninja Crow Clan. He tries to seize control of the city, but is invariably thwarted by the heroes or his own incompetence. He has the bad habit of literally exploding with anger every time he is disappointed at his failure, which usually happens near the end of every episode. He has a large extended family of many nationalities all over the world, all of whom are involved in crime and mayhem, and also have his quirk of exploding when angered. Big Cheese is also a flamboyant and openly gay showoff, prone to overacting, crossdressing (usually a cheerleader outfit), and flirting with male subordinates, much to their disgust.
In the Japanese version he is a fox, but in the English version he identifies himself as a rat, a modification to reinforce his position as an enemy to the cats. His physical appearance is also quite ratlike. His villainy is openly recognized in the English version, whereas he takes great effort to conceal his plots in KNT. Like the singer of the English opening, his voice is strongly reminiscent of comedian Paul Lynde and his English name is a pun on "See more cheese".
Karasu Gennarisai (カラス幻ナリ斉) / Jerry Atric
Voiced by: Naoki Tatsuta (Japanese), Mark Camacho (English)
Jerry Atric is a bald, elderly crow tengu and Big Cheese's trusted advisor and boss of the Ninja Crows. His voice of reason counterbalances the Big Cheese's impulsive nature. He is second in command of the Ninja Crows.
Older promotional materials and VHS release spelled Jerry's last name as Atrick. However, Atric has since become the official spelling such as Madman Entertainment's DVD release. His English name is a play on the word geriatric, which refers to the elderly or the branch of medicine dealing with treating the elderly.
Karamaru (カラ丸) / Bad Bird
Voiced by: Koichi Yamadera (Japanese), Michael O'Reilly (English)
Bad Bird is the youngest leader and the first among Big Cheese's army of ninja crow tengu. He could be in his twenties (20s) or thirties (30s) years old. He is the arch-nemesis of the Pizza Cats and rival of Speedy. He executes most of the Big Cheese's plans. Bad Bird and his henchmen follow the age-old archetype of raven ninja, or Tengu. Bad Bird usually wears a Japanese monk outfit (an outfit with a giant conical straw hat) when he's going out.
Bad Bird takes his rivalry with the Pizza Cats, especially Speedy, a great deal more seriously than the other crows, thus driving him to train hard to defeat them. As time goes on and his defeats continue, he becomes more and more disillusioned with the battle against them, until he ends up aiding them in the finale. Being from the country, in the Japanese version, Bad Bird's natural voice has a deep country accent, which he only speaks in when meeting with his childhood friend and love interest Okara (Carla).
Karasu Ninja (カラス忍者) / The Ninja Crows
Voiced by: Arthur Holden and Mark Hellman (English)
Jerry Atric and Big Cheese's personal army of henchmen, these crow tengu are led by Bad Bird. There are both males and females in the group. They are often the first to face the Pizza Cats in battle, and, with a few exceptions, are defeated easily because of their lack of training. When they are not doing any evil schemes for Seymour, they serve as his bodyguards, chauffeurs, deliverymen, machine builders, laundromats, housekeepers, maids, babysitters, errand boys/girls, and other odd jobs.
Choinaa Nana Gou / Yard Bird
Voiced by: Mizutani Yuuko (Japanese), Arthur Holden (English)
Yard Bird is a hyperactive and very fast flightless bird that appeared in only a few episodes, mainly as Big Cheese's delivery person. They have a design defect that causes them to explode if they stop moving for more than two seconds. In KNT, the character was modeled after Jackie Joyner-Kersee (Japanese reading Jakkii Joinaa-Kaashii, Choinaa rhymes with Joinaa), the Olympic gold medalist, while their English name is derived from the famous 1960s English rock band The Yardbirds (which is itself derived from the nickname of jazz legend Charlie Parker).
Yami no Yon Nin Shu / The Rude Noise
Zankaa / Bad Max Voiced By: Yasunori Matsumoto (Japanese), Arthur Grosser (English)
Bonkaa / Cannonball Battery Voiced By: Kōzō Shioya (Japanese), Richard Dumont (English)
Rekkaa / Mojo Rojo Voiced By: Hiroyuki Shibamoto→Kenyuu Horiuchi (Japanese), Gary Jewell (English)
Wokkaa / Ronnie Geissmuller Voiced By: Kenyuu Horiuchi→Masami Kikuchi (Japanese), Michael Rudder (English)
An elite group of four Ninja Crows called into service after Bad Bird's numerous failures to achieve results against the Pizza Cats. In the English version, they are a heavy metal band that is sometimes hired by Big Cheese. The Rude Noise are the villains' equivalent of the Rescue Team, composed of:

Bad Max, a.k.a. Crow Magnon (Zankaa ザンカア): Leader of the Rude Noise. His name is a play on Mad Max, a character from a movie by the same name, played by Mel Gibson; his alias is a play on the prehistoric man of the Cro-Magnon caves. His outfit has axes, an eye patch.
Cannonball Battery (ボンカア Bonkaa): His name is a play on famous jazz saxophonist Julian "Cannonball" Adderley. He has a high-pitched voice, which is diametric to his rather large size. He also tends to make strange comments, such as wondering if hair coloring works on feathers. Big blue armor crow.
Mojo Rojo (レッカア Rekkaa): wears red armor.
Ronnie Geissmuller (ウォッカア Wokkaa): His name is a play on Johnny Weissmuller. His armor is green.

The Rude Noise also have a Sentai-like ability that has been demonstrated in at least two versions. Both of these group attacks are preceded by some sort of formation flight of the crows which is followed by an emission of thick, black smoke. The first group technique conjures a giant indestructible robot. The other technique was called "Operation: Smogberry, Smoke 'Em If You Got 'Em" (in the English version), where the Rude Noise becomes a giant crow made of a murderous miasma of smoke that makes dive bombing attacks. In the Japanese version, despite their prominence among the crows, they are frequently forgotten by most of the cast, even their own allies.

== Mecha ==
Each episode features at least one Mecha, usually as part of the villains' plot to take over Little Tokyo. However, the Samurai Pizza Cats also have some technology at their disposal.

Nyagō-King (ニャゴーキング, Nyagō-kingu) / The Supreme Catatonic
The Supreme Catatonic is a giant robot that aids the Pizza Cats whenever they get into a tight spot. The robot is summoned by a signal sent out by Speedy's Ginzu sword. It has two forms: Sphinx mode, which is the form it assumes when not being used, and a giant robot form for battling. The Supreme Catatonic is also what launches the Goonie Birds. The robot is armed with fish-themed weapons, such as a fish spear and fish blaster. Polly and Guido normally operate the robot in battle. When not being used, the Supreme Catatonic is stored in a statue in Mt. Kuchi. The English name is a reference to the catatonic state.
Toritsukkun (トリツックン) / Ginzu Goonie Birds
The Goonie Birds are Pterodactyl-like robot suits. They are ejected from the Sphinx's mouth before it changes into its robot form. They usually dock with the Pizza Cats to gain flight abilities, sometimes called "Extra Topping Pizza Cats mode" in English.
Villain of the day
Nearly every episode presented a unique villain mecha central to the plot. Mecha used by the villains included a "double-decker" robot based on the father and son from "Lone Wolf and Cub" named The Monster Masher (based on the classic song), a giant hot-tub robot (used to scare people into joining health spas), Long Tall Sally (a play on the song lyric of the same name), the Samurai Sun-Spot 16 Robot (an orbital fan-dancing robot that blocked the sun from Little Tokyo, preventing the Pizza Cats from recharging their solar powers), and others.
