= List of A Certain Magical Index video games =

A Certain Magical Index is a light novel series written by Kazuma Kamachi and illustrated by Kiyotaka Haimura. The story follows Toma Kamijo, a high school student from Academy City, and his meeting with Index, a young nun from the Church of England whose mind has been implanted with 103,000 grimoires of the Index Librorum Prohibitorum. The series and its spin-off, A Certain Scientific Railgun, have been adapted into several video games.

== A Certain Magical Index (PSP) ==
Cover poster

A Certain Magical Index is a fighting game developed by Shade for the PlayStation Portable and published by ASCII Media Works, with Kadokawa Games in charge of sales, on January 27, 2011. ASCII Media Works later developed a revised edition of the game titled A Certain Magical Index PSP the Best, which was released by Kadokawa Games on March 22, 2012.

=== Gameplay ===
The game is divided into three modes: battle, story, and communication battle. The "battle mode", also called "vs CPU", allows the player to fight against an AI-controlled character. The "story mode" allows the player to watch the story development of a selected character, with game scenarios written by Kazuma Kamachi. The "communication battle mode", also called "vs HUMAN", allows the player to invite up to two people to play a co-op through the unit's built-in WLAN.

The player's selected character, known as "attacker", can choose from 16 characters to be their combat assistant, known as "partner". The compatibility between the two, which is based on their relationship in the light novel, will determine their ability level.

=== Music ===
The opening theme music for A Certain Magical Index PSP game is "Answer" by Maon Kurosaki.

=== Marketing ===
In September 2010, two exhibits for the game's trial were set up at the Tokyo Game Show 2010 in Chiba and the Dengeki Bunko Autumn Festival 2010 in Tokyo. ASCII Media Works also set up an exhibit at the 9th Games Japan Festa 2010 in Osaka, which was held in October 2010. In January 2011, buses wrapped with the game's poster began to operate for a week around Akihabara, Ikebukuro, Osaka, Shinjuku, Tokushima, and Tokyo. The game's limited edition purchase was bundled with a Mikoto Misaka figma. Two days after the release of the game, a collaboration event with the Oreimo PSP game was held at Akihabara to distribute shopping bags designed with their posters.

=== Reception ===
==== Sales ====
A survey conducted by Media Create reported a sale of 56,017 copies of the game upon its release, ranking #5 in the game software weekly sales on the last week of January 2011.

== A Certain Scientific Railgun (PSP) ==
Cover poster

A Certain Scientific Railgun is an action-adventure game developed by Shade for the PlayStation Portable and published by ASCII Media Works, with Kadokawa Games in charge of sales, on December 8, 2011. The story follows Mikoto Misaka, Kuroko Shirai, Kazari Uiharu, and Ruiko Saten in their investigation of urban legends that take place in Academy City. Kadokawa Games later released a PSP the Best edition of the game on March 28, 2013.

=== Gameplay ===
The game is a combination of 2D and 3D drawings of characters for the conversation and action parts respectively. During the "conversation" part, the player collects information based on the discussion with the characters to solve the urban legend. It is followed by the "Girls Talk" mode that involves the four main characters of the series, where the player enters the collected topics at the right time to change the flow of the story. Afterward, the player will construct the reasoning to solve the mystery during the "Judgment" mode. If the player reaches a good judgment, the Judgment gauge will increase. Otherwise, the story might reach a bad ending route.

In the "action" part, the player needs to defeat the culprit behind the urban legend during quick time events. Original anime scenes, produced by J.C.Staff, will play in the climax of the game.

=== Plot ===
The introductory story of the game follows Mikoto Misaka, Kuroko Shirai, Kazari Uiharu, and Ruiko Saten dining in a family restaurant when they heard the grade school students' discussion of an urban legend called "Hair Cutting Bug". Ruiko then explains that a woman with scissors cut the hair of people who fell asleep in a vacant lot. Mikoto becomes interested in the urban legend and starts to investigate it with her friends.

=== Development ===
J.C.Staff produced about 80 CG events for A Certain Scientific Railgun PSP game, with Kamachi writing the scenarios. fripSide performed the game's theme music titled "Way to Answer". Composer Satoshi Yaginuma composed and arranged the song in three days after he read the game's plot for five weeks. He came up with the title based on the game's element to solve the mystery of urban legends by Mikoto Misaka and her friends.

=== Marketing and release ===
ASCII Media Works released a promotional video for A Certain Scientific Railgun PSP game on November 17, 2011. The game was intended to be released on November 23, 2011, but was delayed to its current release date. A Kuroko Shirai figma and a special cleaning cloth designed by J.C.Staff were bundled with the limited edition release of the game.

== A Certain Magical Index: Struggle Battle ==
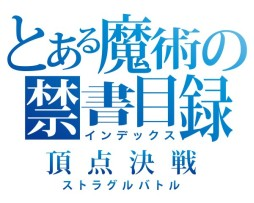
Game logo

A Certain Magical Index: Struggle Battle (とある魔術の禁書目録(インデックス)頂点決戦(ストラグルバトル), Toaru Majutsu no Indekkusu: Chōten Kessen (Sutoraguru Batoru)) (Note: lit. A Certain Magical Index: Summit Decisive Battle) was a mobile-based social card game developed by Heroz for Mobage, which was published by ASCII Media Works on December 25, 2012. It was later distributed for the Mixi platform on July 16, 2013.

=== Gameplay ===
Players collected and built decks of cards to battle with other players, which were divided into two types that were located on the upper left corner: magic (symbolized by the Star of David) and science (symbolized by the atom). The cards were categorized into several levels of rarity: N (normal), N^{+}, R (rare), R^{+}, HR, SR (super rare), and SR^{+}. Aside from battles, visual novel-styled scenarios written by Kamachi were also in the game. Players could participate in limited-time events that were held thrice in a month to receive exclusive cards and luxury rewards.

=== Marketing ===
A pre-registration for the game began on November 22, 2012, with registered players to receive a specially-drawn Mikoto Misaka limited card. A Christmas game event was held from December 25 to 28, 2012, where players received SR cards of Index and Mikoto in their Santa Claus outfit. On December 29, 2012, at Comiket 83, limited edition SR cards of Index in her John Pen's mode were distributed in the Dengeki Bunko booth.

=== Reception ===
A Certain Magical Index: Struggle Battle was ranked in Mobage's top 20 apps and was popular among its users, with over 400,000 registered players.

=== Sequel ===
The game entered its second season on February 3, 2015, after ASCII Media Works released a major update, rebranding it as A Certain Magical Index: Struggle Battle II and expanding it to the GREE platform. The update came with three new characters, a new card rarity called "SSR", and a new feature called "Partner Effect" to allow the character's "partner", whom they dated within the game, to participate in battles with additional effects. The official website of Mobage announced that the game ended its service on March 30, 2018.

== A Certain Magical and Scientific Ensemble ==
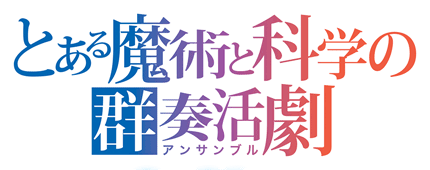
Game logo

A Certain Magical and Scientific Ensemble (とある魔術と科学の群奏活劇(アンサンブル), Toaru Majutsu to Kagaku no Gunsō Katsugeki (Ansanburu)) (Note: lit. A Certain Magical and Scientific Ensemble Action Picture) is a visual novel game developed by Guyzware for the PlayStation Portable and PlayStation Vita and published by Namco Bandai Games on February 21, 2013. The game is a crossover between A Certain Magical Index and A Certain Scientific Railgun franchises.

=== Synopsis ===
==== Settings ====
The game scenarios that were written by Kamachi are divided into four interconnected stories: "Magic (Surface)", "Magic (Hidden)", "Science (Surface)", and "Science (Hidden)". They are set before the events of the Daihasei Festival story arc of the series and the story will lead to A Certain Magical Index: The Movie – The Miracle of Endymion.

==== Plot ====
Magic (Surface): Toma Kamijo and Index plan for their shopping using the coupon from his Academy City SNS Rondo Net when he encountered Mikoto Misaka also using the same social networking site. They share their excitement with Venus Probe Contest while Academy City launches a rocket into space.

Magic (Hidden): Motoharu Tsuchimikado is summoned by Academy City Board Chairman Aleister Crowley for a "certain command" as the chaos around the city ensues, such as mysterious bombings and traffic control system errors. He then enlists the help of Kaori Kanzaki.

Science (Surface): Kuroko Shirai is busy with her Judgment work in preparation for the Daihaseisai. She chats with Mikoto when they heard the roar of the rocket soaring to space. She mentions the connection of the rocket to the Venus Probe Contest that would be held in Academy City SNS Rondo Net.

Science (Hidden): Ruiko Saten enthusiastically introduces Kazari Uiharu to the Academy City SNS Rondo Net. Kazari becomes excited to learn that she could use the coupon from the site to purchase sweets.

=== Development ===
Namco Bandai Games had shown interest in making a game with Kamachi as early as January 2011. The company intended to produce a new game for A Certain Magical Index series but they decided to combine it with A Certain Scientific Railgun franchise. Guyzware and Namco Bandai Games announced on June 8, 2012, a collaboration project for a game adaptation of the series, which later revealed to be a crossover visual novel game for PSP. During the planning stage, Kamachi was asked to write the game's plot that would match the film. He wrote the Magic (Surface) route and supervised the other three routes that were handled by Namco Bandai Games. The characters were designed using the Live2D system to depict "slimy" movements and expressive gestures.

=== Marketing ===
On August 30, 2012, the game's release date was announced to be February 21, 2013. The game's official website released its first promotional video on October 8, 2012. Four chibi toys from Banpresto for Index, Mikoto Misaka, Ureapaddy Exica, and Kukimoto Hibiki were included in the first production limited release, which was delivered on October 21, 2012. Namco Bandai Games released a promotional video for the games' Magic (Hidden) route on February 14, 2013.

=== Reception ===
==== Sales ====
Famitsu reported a sale of 19,004 copies of the game three days after its release, ranking #5 in the top 30 game software sales ranking dated February 18–24, 2013.

== A Certain Scientific Railgun S Puzzle ==
A Certain Scientific Railgun S Puzzle (とある科学の超電磁砲Sパズル, Toaru Kagaku no Rērugan S Pazuru) was a puzzle game developed by ASCII Media Works for iOS, which was released on July 26, 2013. It was based on A Certain Scientific Railgun S anime series. The game was no longer available in the App Store, with the app's last update being on October 31, 2014.

=== Gameplay ===
The player arranged 3 or more panels horizontally or vertically to match patterns and erase them. The bonus button designed with the selected character from the start of the game was located on the bottom screen and could be used five times. 16 wallpapers were available once the player cleared the stages, which could be used for the app's title screen.

== A Certain Magical and Scientific Puzzdex ==
A Certain Magical and Scientific Puzzdex (とある魔術と科学の謎解目録(パズデックス), Toaru Majutsu to Kagaku no Nazoto Mokuroku (Pazudekkusu)) (Note: lit. A Certain Magical and Scientific Index of Riddle Solutions) was an action puzzle game developed by Heroz, and published by ASCII Media Works on March 16, 2014, for Android and in April for iOS. The game ended its service on June 30, 2016.

=== Gameplay ===
Players needed to form five character cards, called "deck", to play quests. Character cards had five different colored "attributes" (passion, cool, gentle, pride, and innocent) and categorized into two "sides" (magic and science) that were located on the upper left corner. Quests had three types (normal, tutorial, and event) that required "stamina" to play them, except for tutorial mode. "Limited Time Quest" was only available in a certain period of time, where players could obtain limited character cards.

During a quest, the screen was vertically divided into two: the upper part contained five chibi characters of the player's deck, and the lower part contained six-columned five-rowed hexagonal-shaped colored tiles that the player slid horizontally or vertically to combine colors based on their character card attribute and launch an attack.

=== Marketing and release ===
Pre-registration for A Certain Magical and Scientific Puzzdex was held on January 10, 2014, through Dengeki Mobile NEO, with registered users to receive Gekota medal and Mikoto Misaka Shower Version card. The game was scheduled to be released in February 2014 for Android and in March 2014 for iOS but was postponed to their new release dates.

== A Certain Magical Index: Genuine Mobile Game ==
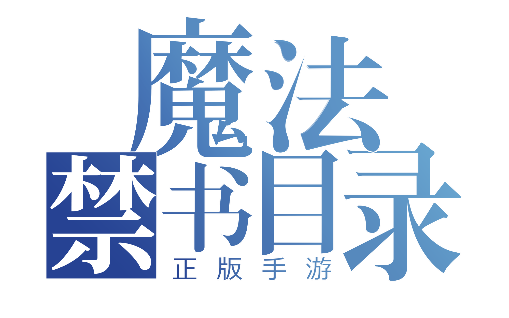
Game logo

A Certain Magical Index: Genuine Mobile Game (Chinese: 魔法禁书目录正版手游; pinyin: Mófǎ Jìnshū Mùlù Zhèngbǎn Shǒu Yóu) was a massively multiplayer online role-playing game developed by NetEase Games under the supervision of Kadokawa Corporation, which was released in China on August 31, 2017, for iOS and on September 7 for Android. The game was expanded for PC on January 3, 2019. NetEase Games suspended the game, along with their other products, for one day on April 4, 2020, to mourn for the victims who died during the COVID-19 pandemic. The game ended its service on January 17, 2022.

=== Gameplay ===
Players could explore the open world of Academy City and visit its places (such as baseball stadium and bathhouse), interact with objects and NPCs (such as Komoe Tsukuyomi), and complete tasks to win rewards.

Players could also challenge strong bosses, whose attacks were mostly directional AOE (area of effect), to grow into a powerful esper and fight mobs to maintain the peace of the city.

Three minigames were available to gain coins and experience. One of them was available upon reaching Level 10 and required players to clear two waves of Security Robots and defeat the giant variation of it. The second one was for players who reach Level 12 and required them to survive the attacks from Misaka clones for 90 seconds. The third one was open at Level 30 and required players to clear three waves of spies who sneak inside Academy City and defeat Motoharu Tsuchimikado as the final boss.

=== Development ===
In July 2016, NetEase Games released a trailer that announced their production of a mobile game for A Certain Magical Index series. fripSide performed the game's theme music titled "Adverse Wind".

=== Marketing and release ===
NetEase Games first promoted A Certain Magical Index Genuine Mobile Game in their booth at ChinaJoy 2016. The game also participated at the 15th Firefly Animation Game Carnival in Guangzhou, with Atsushi Abe also present for a fan meeting. NetEase Games released a promotional video for the game, which featured the 3D map of Academy City. The company set up an exhibit booth for the game at China International Cartoon & Game (CCG) Expo 2017 in Shanghai.

The game was later released in Hong Kong and Taiwan by LongE Play on July 12, 2019.

=== Reception ===
A Certain Magical Index Genuine Mobile Game ranked #5 in the App Store's top 5 free game list within 24 hours of its release.

== A Certain Magical Virtual-On ==
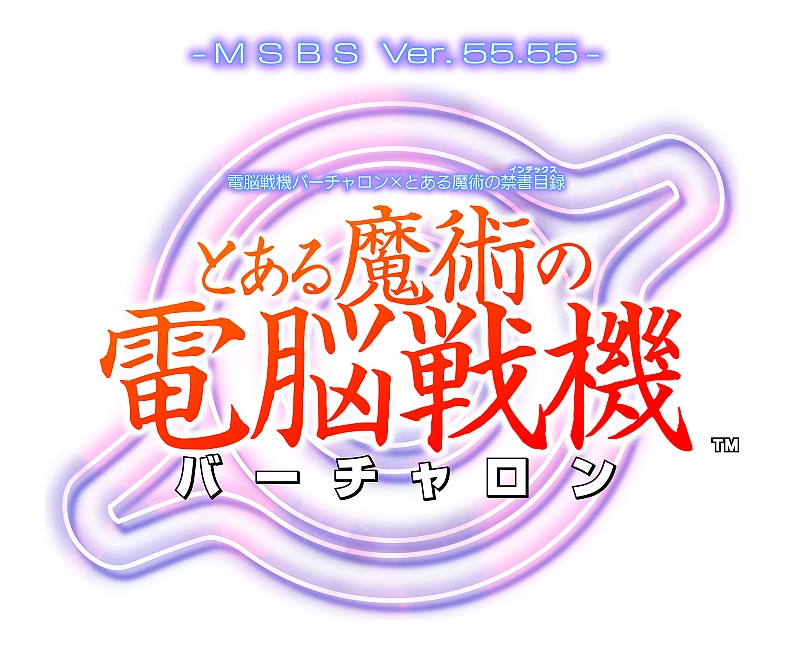
Game logo

A Certain Magical Virtual-On (とある魔術の電脳戦機(バーチャロン), Toaru Majutsu no Den'nō Senki (Bācharon)) (Note: Official title is Cyber Troopers Virtual-On x A Certain Magical Index: A Certain Magical Virtual-On (電脳戦機バーチャロン×とある魔術の禁書目録(インデックス) とある魔術の電脳戦機(バーチャロン), Den'nō Senki Bācharon x Toaru Majutsu no Indekkusu: Toaru Majutsu no Bācharon).) is a 2018 fighting game co-developed by Sega and Access Games for the PlayStation 4 and PlayStation Vita and published by Sega on February 15. It was based on Kamachi's light novel of the same name. Sega temporarily suspended the game's sale in March 2019 for undisclosed reasons.

=== Gameplay ===
The game was divided into several modes: story, network, tutorial, and training. The "story" mode told the events of the light novel and would help the player to learn the truth of the incident happened in Academy City as it progresses. The "network" mode allowed the player to match with other players and was divided into two types: rank and player. The "rank" match involved ranking to the national scoreboard, while the "player" match was a free-to-play mode between two players with rules set by the host. The "tutorial" mode would help the player to learn the game from Komoe Tsukuyomi. The "training" mode allowed the player to test their Virtualoid (in-game fighting robot) for a practice.

Players could also select the "mission" mode, which was divided into several battle modes: standard, arcade, boss, destruction, and explosion. The "standard" battle mode involved either solo or duo battle format. The "arcade" battle mode allowed the player to increase their Virtualoid enhancements before the start of the game. The "boss" battle mode involved defeating a boss-specific Virtualoid in a limited time. The "destruction" battle mode involved waves of Virtualoids that the player needed to clear. The "explosion" battle mode allowed the player to play the game in a rugby-type format.

=== Development ===
Sega and Dengeki Bunko announced a collaboration project to develop a crossover game between the Virtual On franchise and A Certain Magical Index series, along with the release of a teaser video. Hajime Katoki redesigned the Virtualoids to match with the characters from A Certain Magical Index series. J.C.Staff produced the opening animation for the game. The game's soundtrack was composed by Yuzo Koshiro, while Yuka Iguchi and Rina Satō performed on the theme music "Get Ready!".

=== Marketing ===
During the 2017 PlayStation Press Conference in Japan, Sega announced the release date of the game to be on February 15, 2018, and released its first promotional video. The company set up an exhibit for the game at the Tokyo Game Show 2017 from September 21 to 24, 2017. A second promotional video was released on December 6, 2017, which introduced the game's different modes. Shigeo Akira, the game producer, was present during the trial session of the game at Animate Akihabara in Tokyo on December 9, 2017.

Akira visited the stores in Osaka and Nagoya for the game's in-store experience events on January 13 and 28, 2018, respectively. Sega promoted the game in their exhibit at the Taipei Game Show 2018 from January 26 to 29, 2018. On the day of the game's release, Sega held a Twitter campaign to follow their account and retweet a certain tweet for a chance to win the voice casts' autographed colored paper sets.

=== Reception ===
A Certain Magical Virtual-On ranked #8 on the week it was released, with 17,938 copies sold.

== A Certain Magical Index: Imaginary Fest ==
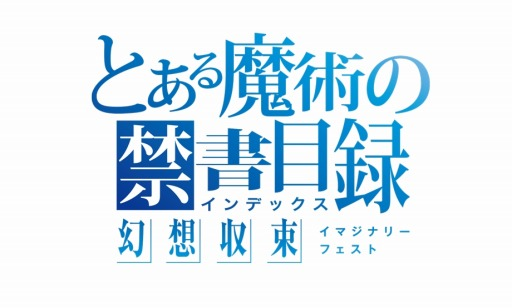
Game logo

A Certain Magical Index: Imaginary Fest (とある魔術の禁書目録(インデックス)幻想収束(イマジナリーフェスト), Toaru Majutsu no Indekkusu: Gensō Shūsoku (Imajinarī Fesuto)) (Note: lit. A Certain Magical Index: Illusion Convergence) is a role-playing game developed by Headlock for Android and iOS and published by Square Enix on July 4, 2019. Voice artists from anime series reprised their roles and characters that are yet to be featured from light novel series and its spin-offs would be introduced. The game ended its service on December 2, 2024, with a planned offline version released that day.

=== Gameplay ===
Players can form a group of up to 12 characters, with roles divided into two: battle and assist characters. The maximum number of groups that can be created is 5. The turn-based battlefield consists of 3 battle characters positioned in a five-slot deck-like row while facing enemies in the same format.

The game is divided into several quests. "Main Story" has two sub-quests: battle and story. The "battle" quest allows the player to fight enemies and the boss and needs to win to advance, while the "story" quest is for story-viewing only. "Co-op Play" allows up to five players to team up against a boss. "Player Vs. Player" allows the player's group to challenge the other player's team in a battle. "3Team vs 3Team" allows the player's three groups (total of 18 characters) to fight against the other player's three groups. "Evolution Quest" allows the player to earn items to upgrade their characters. Players can also choose "Event" and "Simulation".

The "Memories" section can be selected in the game's menu, which contains four modes: Main, Side and Spot stories, and Extra. The "Side Story" mode allows the player to read various original in-game stories. The "Spot Story" mode allows the player to read stories of characters in a selected location.

=== Music ===
Maon Kurosaki performed the first opening theme music of A Certain Magical Index: Imaginary Fest titled "Junction", while fripSide performed the second opening theme music titled "Worlds Collide".

=== Marketing ===
On January 4, 2019, Square Enix released a teaser trailer that announced a mobile-based game titled A Certain Magical Index: Imaginary Fest. A promotional video trailer was released on June 28, 2019, which revealed its gameplay.

==== Post-launch contents ====
A Certain Magical Index: Imaginary Fest held several crossover events with other anime and video game franchises, including KonoSuba: God's Blessing on this Wonderful World! Legend of Crimson, Shakugan no Shana, Nier, That Time I Got Reincarnated as a Slime, The Strongest Sage With the Weakest Crest, The Irregular at Magic High School, Durarara!!×2, and Fullmetal Alchemist.

== A Certain Scientific Railgun: Spectrum Story ==
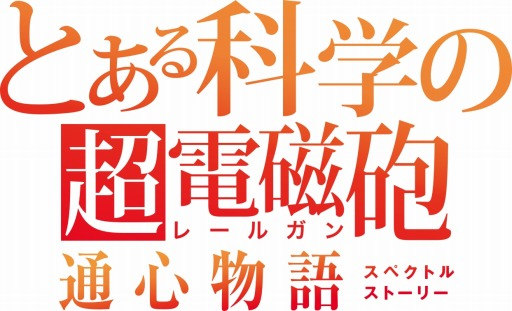
Game logo

A Certain Scientific Railgun: Spectrum Story (とある科学の超電磁砲(レールガン)通心物語(スペクトルストーリー), Toaru Kagaku no Rērugan: Tsūshin Monogatari (Supekutorusutōrī)) (Note: lit. A Certain Scientific Railgun: Heart-to-Heart Communication Story) was an adventure game developed by Now Production for Android and iOS and published by D-techno on March 27, 2020. It was based on A Certain Scientific Railgun T anime series and featured an interactive video call with a 3D-drawn Mikoto Misaka. The game ended its service on October 29, 2021, with its support ended on January 31, 2022.

=== Gameplay ===
The game had three options that could be selected on the bottom of the screen: messages, video chat, and menu. In the "video chat" section, the player was in a video call with Mikoto Misaka and needed to select the right dialogue that popped up on the screen to advance the conversation and story. The player's choice of an answer would affect their relationship with her and, if the bond deepens, would unlock new scenarios. The "messages" option allowed the player to view messages from other characters of the series and collect commemorative photos.

=== Plot ===
The story follows Toma Kamijo receiving a device for an experiment, which was equipped with a thought-controlled MUI (mind user interface). He becomes stuck in a conversation with Mikoto Misaka after the device automatically called her based on their mutual desire for communication.

=== Development ===
The main visual of A Certain Scientific Railgun: Spectrum Story was drawn by J.C.Staff.

=== Marketing ===
On November 28, 2019, the official website of A Certain Scientific Railgun: Spectrum Story was opened and a Twitter campaign was launched for a chance to receive a handwritten autograph from Rina Satō, which was also given on the game's release date through another Twitter campaign. D-techno released a promotional video of the game on January 6, 2020, while another Twitter campaign was launched for the first 10 people who retweet the campaign tweets to receive Quo cards worth ¥3,000. On March 5, 2020, a new Twitter campaign was launched for the first 10 people who retweet the campaign tweets to receive the app's original Quo cards.
