= Virtual On =

Cyber Troopers Virtual-On
- Wordmark as seen on the 2019 PlayStation 4 compilation game Virtual-On Masterpiece 1995–2001
- Genres: Action game; Action-adventure (Marz)
- Developers: Sega AM3/Hitmaker; Sega AM2
- Publisher: Sega
- Platforms: Arcade, Sega Saturn, Microsoft Windows, Dreamcast, PlayStation 2, Xbox 360, PlayStation Network, PlayStation 4, PlayStation Vita
- First release: Virtual On: Cyber Troopers; December 1995
- Latest release: A Certain Magical Virtual-On; February 15, 2018

Cyber Troopers Virtual-On (電脳戦機バーチャロン, Dennō Senki Bāchyaron; roughly 'Computer Fighting Machine Virtual-On') is a series of video games developed by Sega AM3/Hitmaker, and originally created by Juro Watari. The games feature fast, action-oriented gameplay requiring quick reflexes, featuring mecha called Virtuaroids or "VRs", that are large robots the player controls in battles against enemy VRs. The first game was Cyber Troopers Virtual-On (1995 video game), which was released globally, while its following four installments in the series were mainly Japan exclusives where the series has retained high popularity.

Controls revolve around twin-stick control, in which two joysticks, complemented by an array of controls, are used by players. Additionally, in the plot of the first game, the Virtual-On's arcade machine is actually a remote operation device sent from the future in search of "Virtual-On Positive" (VO+) pilots. The mecha designs for all installments of the series were created by robot designer Hajime Katoki. Related merchandise released for sale include plastic models, original soundtracks, trading figurines, light novels and audio drama CDs.

== Games ==
The games in the series are as follows:

Virtual On: Cyber Troopers
Released between 1995 and 1996 for arcades, Sega Saturn, and PC. A home version of the Twin Stick controller was produced to coincide with the release of the Saturn and Windows 95 versions. The game's iterations are denoted as 'M.S.B.S. (Mind Shift Battle System) v3.3' (SEGA Model 2 arcade hardware), 'v3.3S' (Sega Saturn) and 'v.3.3W' (Windows 95).
An updated version of the Saturn port was released in 1996 in Japan and 1997 in North America, supporting online play using the SEGA NetLink adapter. In 2007, the game was ported to the PlayStation 2 in Japan only, as part of the SEGA AGES 2500 series.
In the years following its release, it has been retroactively given the subtitle 'Operation Moongate' to differentiate it from the series as a whole, though this subtitle is not displayed in the game itself.
Cyber Troopers Virtual-On Oratorio Tangram
Released between 1998 and 2000 for arcades and Sega Dreamcast. As with the prior game, a home version of the Twin Stick controller launched alongside the Dreamcast release. Very few VOOT arcade units made it outside Japan.
Some features present in the Dreamcast version, such as the ability to create custom Virtuaroid colour palettes, and multiplayer between two Dreamcast units using a link cable, were removed from its North American release. The Dreamcast version was not released in Europe.
The game's iterations are denoted as 'M.S.B.S. v5.2', 'v5.4' (SEGA Model 3 arcade hardware), 'v.5.45' (Sega Dreamcast), 'v5.6' (Rare Bonus disc addon) and 'v5.66' (SEGA NAOMI arcade hardware). Later versions for the arcade incorporated a VMU slot for imported colours created using the Dreamcast version.
The v5.66 iteration was ported to Xbox 360 on April 29, 2009.
Cyber Troopers Virtual-On Force
Released exclusively in Japanese arcades in 2001 for the SEGA Hikaru hardware. It was the first game in the series to be released after AM3 was renamed to Hitmaker, and features a new gameplay system where players are teamed up in pairs to oppose another pair, with a leader/subordinate ruleset. The machines use a card system found in other arcade machines to keep player data. The game's revisions are denoted as 'M.S.B.S. v7.5', 'v7.6' and 'v7.7'. The v7.7 revision was later released on the Xbox 360 on December 22, 2010.
Cyber Troopers Virtual-On MARZ
First released in Japan and the United States in 2003 for the PlayStation 2, and was rereleased on the PlayStation 3 in Japan in 2013. It features gameplay derived from Virtual-On Force, and is the first Virtual-On game to have a single player story mode. No Twin Stick controller was produced for the PlayStation 2.. The game's sole iteration is 'M.S.B.S. v8.5'.
A Certain Magical Virtual-On
First released in Japan for the PlayStation 4 and PlayStation Vita in 2018. The game is a collaboration between Sega and Dengeki Bunko, featuring characters from Kazuma Kamachi's light novel series A Certain Magical Index. The game's sole iteration is 'M.S.B.S. v55.55'. It was released on February 15, 2018. The digital version was delisted from the PlayStation Store on March 21st, 2019.

Additionally, Cyber Troopers Virtual-On Masterpiece 1995~2001 is a compilation of the original trio of games, released for PlayStation 4 in Japan in November 2019. This collection is largely based on the individual Xbox 360 and PlayStation 3 releases of the individual games featured.

== Plastic models ==
The first plastic model series based on Virtuaroid was released shortly before the Japanese release of Oratorio Tangram, and were made by Wave Corporation. These Virtuaroid models are borrowed from Operation Moongate as well as Oratorio Tangram, One Man Rescue and Fragmentary Passage. These models were also made by Kotobukiya, which is well known for making plastic models of Medabots anime and manga series.

Hasegawa Corporation also manufactures the plastic model kits of Virtuaroids from Cyber Troopers Virtual-On Force and Marz video games. Some Virtuaroids, which were originally available only in a few versions, were expanded to including spinoffs, such as Virtuaroid Guarayakha with special equipment, and more alternate-colored versions of some Virtuaroids.

As of 2014, plastic models of Virtual-On characters are still in production.

== Appearances in other media ==
The Virtuaroids TEMJIN 747J, APHARMD the Hatter, and Fei-Yen Kn from the Virtual-On series appeared in the turn-based strategy game Super Robot Wars Alpha 3. This was the first occasion of characters from a video game series, owned neither by Banpresto nor their parent company Namco Bandai, appearing in a Super Robot Wars game. Of note about the game is that if the other pilots in the game remove their suits, approach the Virtuaroids and try to speak to their pilots, the Virtuaroids would say that they were being remote-piloted by pilots in another plane or dimension.

In the PSP rhythm-action game Hatsune Miku: Project DIVA Extend, the third game in the Project DIVA series, one of the available outfits for Miku to wear was based on Fei-Yen. The special outfit was later made into plastic model figure.

A reference to Virtual-On can be found in 21st episode of the anime Hyōka, where Hōtarō and Satoshi play the Operation Moongate with the Virtuaroids RAIDEN and VIPER-II respectively.

TEMJIN and Fei-Yen appeared in Senko no Ronde 2 as selectable characters via downloadable content.

An emulated version of the original Virtual-On arcade game can be played at the in-game arcade in Yakuza Kiwami 2.

The visual novels Kimi ga Nozomu Eien and Muv-Luv features a nearly identical version instead called Cyber Legion Valgern On.
