= Cyber Troopers Virtual-On Force =

2001 video game

- Developer: Sega AM3
- Publisher: Sega
- Designer: Hajime Katoki
- Series: Virtual On
- Platforms: Arcade, Xbox 360, PlayStation 4
- Release: Arcade: JP: October 2001; Xbox 360: JP: December 22, 2010; PlayStation 4: JP: November 27, 2019
- Genre: Action
- Modes: Single player, Multiplayer
- Arcade system: Sega Hikaru

Cyber Troopers Virtual-On Force (電脳戦機バーチャロン フォース, Dennō Senki Bācharon Fōsu) is a 3D mecha fighting game developed by Sega AM3 (formerly Hitmaker) and published by Sega. It was released in Japanese arcades only on the Sega Hikaru arcade system board in 2001. Following its initial release, there was initially no home console port of the game due to the Hikaru's superior graphical capabilities. A home port of the game was released for Xbox 360 on December 22, 2010.

== Gameplay ==
Force differs from previous entries in that it features four players in 2-on-2 team matches. The battle system is heavily simplified compared to the game's predecessor, Oratorio Tangram, in order to balance the increased number of players. The left-turbo function is removed, and player movement speed is significantly slower. The game website states this as a side-effect of the V-converters being less efficient than the Mars crystals.

The machine uses a magnetic card system to record player data, with the cards being called a "VO4 Pilot's License". Players start by choosing a base Virtuaroid, which will open up other variants in its family tree as the player plays more of the game. Because of this design, a large number of Virtuaroid variants exist, and the game has the largest VR roster of any game in the series name so far.

The VO4 Pilot's License can be used with the VO4 Terminal, which lets players view records, set the pilot name, swap color schemes or use another available Virtuaroid. During the lifespan of the game, updated revisions named 'M.S.B.S. v7.6' and 'v7.7' (iterating upon the original 'v7.5') were produced, with new Virtuaroids, new stages and new magnetic card face designs.

Cyber Troopers Virtual-On MARZ is partially derived from Force, borrowing various gameplay elements, stages, and some Virtuaroid designs, though without support for 4-player matches.

=== Xbox 360 version ===
The Xbox 360 version, based on the v7.7 revision, retains the same gameplay as the arcade version, alongside new modes: 2 on 2 Leader Battles, a co-op boss fight mode, a Mission mode and Xbox Live support for online play. In addition to online play, local 2 player splitscreen and up to 4 player System Link play are supported.. The game also has a special collector's edition which includes a booklet titled Virtual-On Chronicle 15, an overview of the series' history up to that point, and a six disc soundtrack titled Virtual-On Official Sound Data. All of the items come packaged in a box with artwork from Hajime Katoki. Jaguarandi is now available as a hidden character, along with Apharmd the Hatter based on Apharmd J. Preordering the game or purchasing the collector's edition provided the user with a download code for additional cosmetic options that adjust the bust sizes of both female Virtuaroids: Fei-Yen and Angelan.

=== PlayStation 4 version ===
Force was included as part of the Cyber Troopers Virtual-On Masterpiece 1995~2001 collection, released digitally in Japan only for PlayStation 4 in 2019. This rerelease is largely based on the prior Xbox 360 version. The mission mode from the Xbox 360 version is not included; instead, all Virtuaroid variants are unlocked from the start.
