= Bulk Slash =

1997 video game

- Developer: CAProduction
- Publisher: Hudson Soft
- Director: Osamu Tsujikawa
- Programmer: Kenji Ohira; Akira Matsumoto
- Artist: Kunihiko Natsume
- Composer: Takeshi Sato
- Platform: Sega Saturn
- Release: JP: 11 July 1997
- Genres: Action, mech simulator, third-person shooter
- Mode: Single-player

Bulk Slash (Note: Japanese: バルク スラッシュ, Hepburn: Baruku Surasshu) is a third-person action mecha simulation video game developed by CAProduction and published by Hudson Soft for the Sega Saturn in Japan on July 11, 1997. Taking place on a futuristic science fiction setting, where military chief Alois Gardona and discriminated inhabitants of the fictional planet Blau plots a coup d'état against their oppressors, players assume the role of SDF fighter pilot Cress Dawley in order to win the war against Gardona and his army. The game has been met with mostly positive reception from video game magazines and online publications alike since its release; critics praised various aspects of the title such as presentation, soundtrack, gameplay, replay value and graphics.

== Gameplay ==
Gameplay screenshot

Bulk Slash is a third-person action mecha simulation game reminiscent of Virtual On: Cyber Troopers where players assume the role of SDF fighter pilot Cress Dawley taking control of a transforming flying mech through seven stages/levels, each with a boss at the end that must be fought before progressing any further, in an effort to overthrow the army of military chief Alois Gardona of planet Blau alongside his planetary coalition as the main objective. The game takes place in a future where Gardona and discriminated inhabitants of Blau plot a coup d'état against their oppressors, which won a galactic war, to bring power back on their home with the aid of a planetary coalition. During gameplay, players tackle multiple objectives across each stage while fighting airborne and on the ground with a diverse selection of weapons such as bombs capable of obliterating any enemy caught in their blast radius.

A notable gameplay feature is the Manageable Intelligent Support System (M.I.S.S.); on every stage, a female navigator is hidden in certain areas and after being recruited by the players, each one provides their own special abilities. Each navigator players bring alongside during stages gain experience points that are separate from the score and for experience points gained, they are leveled up, altering the game's ending. Players initially take control of the main character at the start, while extra M.I.S.S. navigators are recruited through gameplay and any of them can be switched to between missions:

- Cress Dawley (Note: Kuresu Dōrī (クレス・ドーリー)) – SDF fighter pilot. Main protagonist of the plot and childhood friend of Reezen Ravia.
- Alois Gardona (Note: Aroisu Garutonā (アロイス・ガルドナー)) – Military chief and main antagonist of the story, who plots a coup d'état against their oppressors on Blau to bring power back on the planet.
- Reezen Ravia (Note: Rīzen Ravu~ia (リーゼン・ラヴィア)) – Childhood friend of Cress whose father was executed as war criminal and joined the military group led by Gardona to fight against discrimination of her people on Blau.
- Leone Rhodes (Note: Reone Rōdesu (レオネ・ローデス)) – SDF soldier and heiress of an elite military family.
- Lila Hart (Note: Rira Hāto (リラ・ハート)) – A popular galactic idol.
- Metical Flair (Note: Metikaru Fureā (メティカル・フレアー)) – First child of the royal family on planet Braune.
- Naira Savage (Note: Naira Sabēji (ナイラ・サベージ)) – SDF officer.
- Rupiah Rood (Note: Rupia Rūdo (ルピア・ルード)) – Descendant from a long line of thieves.
- Koron Steiner (Note: Koron Sutainā (コロン・スタイナー)) – SDF sergeant.

== Development and release ==
Bulk Slash was developed for Sega Saturn by CAProduction, who previously worked on projects such as Hagane: The Final Conflict and Ginga Fukei Densetsu Sapphire for Super Famicom and PC Engine Arcade CD-ROM² respectively. The game made use of pre-rendered graphics for its sprites, similar to Nintendo's Donkey Kong Country series. The title was published by Hudson Soft exclusively in Japan on July 11, 1997. To promote its release, a radio commercial was created by Hudson Soft. It was re-released under the Satakore budget label in Japan on August 20, 1998. Although it was not officially released outside Japan, an English fan translation was released in 2021.

== Reception ==
Reception

Review scores
Publication	Score
Consoles +	85%
Famitsu	55 / 100
Saturn Fan	(SS) 6.6/10
Sega Saturn Magazine (JP)	8.0 / 10

Bulk Slash has been met with mostly positive reception from video game magazines and online publications alike since its release. Famitsu gave the game an overall mixed score. The Japanese Sega Saturn Magazine rated the title with an 8.0 out of 10 score. Nicolas Gavet of French gaming magazine Consoles + praised the presentation, graphics, sound design, gameplay and replay value, rating it with an 85% score. James Price of British magazine Saturn Power commended its large scale, 3D polygon visuals, consistent framerate, stating that the "Saturn's oft-maligned 3D visuals are better than many critics would have us believe". GameSetWatch's Danny Cowan noted that the graphics took advantage of the Saturn's hardware, as well as the colorful presentation and controls. Retro Gamer's Steve L. regarded it as "one slick action game on the Sega Saturn that all Saturn diehards should seek out". Hardcore Gamer's Jahanzeb Khan claimed that "very few games showcased the true potential of the underutilized Saturn hardware, and Bulk Slash is one that will still turn some heads", while commending it as "an addictive and highly re-playable mech action game".
