= Dean Hagopian =

Canadian actor, radio personality and musician

Dean Hagopian is a Canadian actor, former radio personality, musician and record producer.

== Biography ==
Starting in the 1960s, Hagopian worked at numerous radio stations including CKOY in Ottawa, Ontario, CFOX, where he worked the morning shift in 1967 and CJFM in Montreal, Quebec. Before that, he was a member of the musical group The Staccatos, who later became The Five Man Electrical Band. Hagopian produced the first album made by the music group Rabble.

== Filmography ==
He had minor roles in films such as Scanners, Snake Eyes, Brainscan, and Bad Santa 2.

=== Television ===
Year	Title	Role	Notes
1982–1983	The Mysterious Cities of Gold	Kalmec	3 episodes
1989	The Journey Home		
1990–1991	Samurai Pizza Cats	Seymour "Big" Cheese	52 episodes
1996–1998	Night Hood	Howard Randolph Karst	25 episodes
1999–2000	Mega Babies	Additional voices	
2023	Alert: Missing Persons Unit	Eldon Hemingway	1 episode

=== Video games ===
Year	Title	Role	Notes
2027	Samurai Pizza Cats: Blast from the Past!	Seymour "Big" Cheese	
