= Gundam Sentinel =

Japanese novel series

- Series' logo, from Model Graphix's Gundam Wars III: Gundam Sentinel - The Battle of Real Gundam

ガンダム・センチネル
- Genre: Mecha, Action, Military
- Serial novel
- Written by: Masaya Takahashi
- Magazine: Model Graphix
- Original run: September 1987 – August 1988

Gundam Sentinel (ガンダム・センチネル, Gandamu Senchineru) is a novel set in the Universal Century timeline of the Gundam universe, originally serialized in Model Graphix magazine between September 1987 and August 1988. Gundam Sentinel became a cult hit, due to its super-detailed mechanical designs and an intricate story by veteran writer Masaya Takahashi. Set between the final phase of Mobile Suit Zeta Gundam and the early stages of Gundam ZZ in UC 0088, the story shows the Earth Federation's efforts to stop an insurrection of elite Federation officers.

Gundam Sentinel took on a much more realistic, technical style of thinking and look at the Gundam universe, where mobile suits were seen more as fighter jets or military weapons. They were larger, had weapons more powerful than their predecessors', the characters were older, and the plot was on a smaller scale than what is usually found in other Gundam series. It also marked the debut of Hajime Katoki, who would become one of the franchise's most prolific mechanical designers. Gundam Sentinel is one of the most well known Gundam side stories to have been published, and is noted by Gundam fans as being one of the most mature stories in the franchise.

The series was never animated (although a short animated television commercial for a model kit was made) or released as a manga, but the mecha have been featured in various SD Gundam video games, such as SD Gundam G Generation F.

== Production ==
Bandai originally proposed to Model Graphix the idea of having the first "non-visual" Gundam, that is, a series totally devoid of animation production and manga as its source material. Model Graphix liked the proposal, since there was a model release vacancy between Mobile Suit Gundam ZZ and the next animated Gundam series, and it would be perfect to release their first model kit for the series, the FA-010A FAZZ.

However, after the first few meetings, and with only part of the story and a few of the mechanical designs in place, Bandai began to lose interest in the project due to the anticipated release of Mobile Suit Gundam: Char's Counterattack, and claiming that the simultaneous release of two Gundam stories would confuse fans. As a result, Bandai abandoned the project with Model Graphix, putting it on "pending" status. With only an alternate color version of the FAZZ model released, the fan community started to doubt the authenticity of Sentinel (due to the display of a sample model kit at the 1987 Japan Hobby Show). Bandai did not take action to defend the issue.

The then-editor of Newtype was displeased with this turn of events, and added Gundam Sentinel into its August 1987 issue, with a Gundam Saga II cover special. Six pages of a brief, detailed introduction to the story was inserted, with the words This is REAL!! added to confirm its authenticity. The six pages include detailed schematics of the titular machine, the MSA-0011 Superior Gundam, Hideaki Anno's artwork of a battle between a MSA-007 Nero and a RMS-141 Xeku Eins Type-1 mobile suit, and Hajime Katoki's design of the Superior Gundam.

Once the fan community built up the anticipation of Gundam Sentinel, Bandai decided to go ahead with the serialization of Sentinel, beginning with the September issue of Model Graphix. While Model Graphix would hold the rights to the story, characters, and mobile units, Bandai would have the sole copyright of releasing its models. Wanting to hold onto their partnership, Bandai displayed all five of the sample model kits for the Gundam Sentinel line with full descriptions at the 1988 Japan Hobby Show. The Model Graphix team regarded that year's event as a "Victory", compared to the previous show in 1987, where only a lone Superior Gundam was displayed without any descriptions.

== Plot ==
Earth Federation Space Force (EFSF) officers stationed at the asteroid fortress Pezun rebel against the Federation leadership, which has allied with the Anti-Earth Union Group (AEUG). They self-claim themselves "New Desides" and swear to uphold the Titans' ideology of Earthnoid supremacy. The EFSF assembles Task Force Alpha, a force of EFSF, AEUG, and Karaba veterans equipped with the most advanced mobile suits, and sends them to Pezun to suppress the rebellion before it gets out of hand. The most powerful of them, the MSA-0011 S Gundam, is equipped with an artificial intelligence named ALICE (Advanced Logistic and Inconsequence Cognizing Equipment).

Task Force Alpha, consisting of four Salamis Kai cruisers ships and the flagship Pegasus III, arrives at Pezun and prepares to attack. In the midst of the action, the rebels launch a volley of guided missiles that destroys two cruisers.

A week after the encounter, the Earth Federation sends the Tenth Divisional Fleet to reinforce TF Alpha. However, fleet commander Brian Aeno - who was approached by a New Desides representative days before - announces that his force will side with the rebels. Task Force Alpha and a Federation fleet from the Moon attacks the asteroid, forcing most of the rebels to pull out and head for the city, with a small contingent on Pezun providing cover fire and wiring the base to self-destruct with a nuclear weapon. Task Force Alpha realizes the deception and escape just before the asteroid explodes.

Task Force Alpha begins to probe Ayers City with units of Neros which are quickly defeated by the Gundam Mk. V piloted by New Desides leader Brave Cod. The New Desides - which finally meets Aeno's forces after they arrive - launches a powerful counterattack just as Task Force Alpha drops mobile suits into the area. They also use a logic bomb that paralyzes Alpha's mobile suits after spies crack their operating systems' software. The EFSF counters the programming, but orders a retreat because of the high casualties and sends reinforcements, designated Task Force Beta.

Task Forces Alpha and Beta launch Operation Eagle Falls, an all-out assault on Ayers City. The New Desides, which wanted to use the Moon as a base to establish a new independent nation, fails to rally nearby other lunar cities to their cause. The fighting is spread out over 11 days. Cod also goes on a rampage, destroying Task Force Alpha's three-man FAZZ squad, but is killed by EFSF pilot Ryu Roots and his Ex-S Gundam. As the city's forces surrender to the Federation, Ayers Mayor Kaiser Pinefield commits suicide after learning of Cod's death while the Neo Zeon arrive to extract the remaining New Desides forces.

The New Desides troops that safely escape Ayers rendezvous with the remnants of Aeno's fleet. Master strategist Tosh Cray assumes control of the group, which he formally disbands over issues on whether it should side with the Neo Zeon. He plans to hijack the relay station Penta and use it as a staging area for raiding the Federation Senate at Dakar. To boost the New Desides survivors' chances of success, the Neo Zeon supplies them with the massive Zod'-Iacok mobile armor, which is capable of atmospheric reentry and will be used to bombard the Federation base in the city.

The Pegasus III is deployed to pursue the New Desides at Penta. Arriving at the station, the Pegasus III and its remaining mobile suits confront Cray and the Zod'-Iacok. The New Desides' remaining members head for Earth in three shuttles after Aeno surrenders. The S Gundam launches with Roots and pilots Shin Crypt and Tex West aboard with two Zeta Plus units in support. One Zeta Plus mobile suit is destroyed in the chase and the other, having run out of ammunition destroying one shuttle, safely enters the atmosphere. The Zod'-Iacok separates into two halves called Zoans. One Zoan piloted by First Sides explodes because of an overheating mega-particle beam cannon and Josh Offshore tries to stop Roots from intercepting the second. Cray ejects from the Zoan and reboards one of the shuttles before he falls into the atmosphere.

Realizing the desperate situation, ALICE, the S Gundam's AI, ejects its Core Fighter with Ryu, Crypt, and West inside. The now-self-aware mobile suit chases and destroys the New Desides survivors during the orbital descent, but breaks up under the blistering heat.

== Characters ==
=== Earth Federation Forces ===
- Ryo Roots
- Shin Crypt
- Tex West
- Eton Heathrow
- Stole Mannings
- Sigman Shade
- Chung Yung

=== New Desides ===
- Brave Cod
- Tosh Cray
- Brian Aeno
- Josh Offshore
- Fast Side
- Mike Saotome

=== Civilians ===
- Kaiser Pinefield

== Releases ==
=== Printed media ===
After the series completed its run, Model Graphix combined all of the individual articles into a 320-page photo-novel "mook" format titled Gundam Wars III: Gundam Sentinel -The Battle of "Real Gundam"-, which also includes new material, including interviews with the design staff, mechanical profiles and detailed features on the crafting of the models. It was released in September 1989 and later saw reprints based on fan demand. In July 1990, the story was again republished as a novel titled Gundam Sentinel: Alice's Confession, featuring additional content not in previous serializations of the story. Gundam Wars III was also reprinted in 1994, but it only has articles on the model kits, shortening its size to only 216 pages.

=== Toys/Models ===
The S Gundam and its variations were released along with the Model Graphix segments as 1/144 kits. In 2001 to 2002, Bandai released the S Gundam, EX-S Gundam, and the Xeku-Eins in its HGUC line. The FAZZ, the S Gundam, and the EX-S Gundam were released as part of the Master Grade line in September 2001, October 2002, and March 2003, respectively.

In March 2003, Hajime Katoki redesigned and released the S and EX-S Gundam in an oversized Plan 303E Deep Striker package under his Gundam Fix Figuration line of high-quality action figures. He later collaborated with Bandai to produce figures for the Robot Damashii KA Signature collection, starting with the Gundam Mark V in 2013. The line has since progressed to include a version of the Mark V in Earth Federation colors, and the MSA-007 Nero as a trainer model, Task Force Alpha unit, and the EWAC version.

In January 2018, Bandai announced the March 2018 release of the MSA-0011[Bst] S Gundam Booster Unit Type Plan 303E "Deep Striker" to celebrate the Master Grade line's 200th release.
