= Cyber Troopers Virtual-On Oratorio Tangram =

1998 video game

- Developers: Sega AM3; Sega AM2 (XBLA remake)
- Publishers: WW: Sega; NA: Activision (DC)
- Series: Virtual On
- Platforms: Arcade, Dreamcast, Xbox 360, PlayStation 4
- Release: Arcade: WW: March 1998; Dreamcast: JP: December 9, 1999; NA: June 7, 2000; Xbox 360; April 29, 2009; PlayStation 4: JP: November 27, 2019
- Genres: Action, Shooter, Fighting
- Modes: Single player, multiplayer
- Arcade system: Sega Model 3 (first edition); Sega NAOMI (second edition)

Cyber Troopers Virtual-On Oratorio Tangram (電脳戦機バーチャロン オラトリオ・タングラム, Dennō Senki Bācharon Oratorio Tanguramu) is a 1998 arcade action game from Sega, a 3D fighting game where the player assumes control of a giant humanoid robot. It was developed initially on the Sega Model 3 arcade hardware (M.S.B.S. Ver.5.2). Updated versions (Ver.5.4/5.45) were ported to the Dreamcast home console in 1999 and to North American arcades in 2000. A third update (Ver.5.66) was developed on the NAOMI board in 2000 and was ported to the Xbox 360 in 2009. Oratorio Tangram is part of the Virtual On series and is the sequel to Virtual On: Cyber Troopers (1995); it was followed by the Japan-exclusive Cyber Troopers Virtual-On Force (2001).

== Gameplay ==
As with its predecessor Virtual On: Cyber Troopers, Cyber Troopers Virtual-On Oratorio Tangram uses two joysticks for its controls.

== Plot ==
The game starts 20 years after the events of Virtual On: Cyber Troopers. After the defeat of Z-Gradt, the mightiest VR and the final boss of the first game, humans continued to battle in their VRs, searching for supremacy. However an unknown AI known as Tangram has awakened and became self-conscious. With the directive to destroy humanity, Tangram infects Earth's mother computer with a virus called "Tangram Virus" and hacks into all VR systems, except for the player's VR. It plans to use the infected VRs to destroy the last human colonies that survived the previous war. The player character begins the mission to defeat all VRs and destroy Tangram.

After defeating all VRs, the player character is teleported to the Earth's mother computer system to fight Tangram. Depending on the final battle outcome, there are two endings.

In the good ending, Tangram is erased from the computer and the player's VR is teleported back to Earth's stratosphere, where its armour is critically damaged during the fall but is saved by VRs that came on the Floating Carrier. Fei-Yen is saved by Angelan or the opposite and the others (Temjin, Raiden, Dodray, Bal-Bados, Specineff, Cypher, and Apharmd) are saved by the same model VRs. Alternatively, If the player's time counter reaches 0, Tangram hacks into the player's VR system and shuts it down, resulting in a Game Over screen.

== Development ==
The new Virtuaroids were all designed by Hajime Katoki.

Cyber Troopers Virtual-On Oratorio Tangram was unveiled at the 1997 JAMMA show, at which six Virtuaroids were playable: Temjin, Raiden, Apharmd, Fei-yen, Grys-Vok, and Cypher. The game was also exhibited at the February 1998 AOU Show, where it drew large crowds.

== Reception ==
Reception

Aggregate scores
| Aggregator | Score | |
| Aggregator | Dreamcast | Xbox 360 |
|---|---|---|
| GameRankings | 80% | 75% |
| Metacritic | N/A | 73/100 |

Review scores
| Publication | Score | |
| Publication | Dreamcast | Xbox 360 |
|---|---|---|
| AllGame | 4.5/5 | N/A |
| CNET Gamecenter | 9/10 | N/A |
| Edge | 7/10 | 7/10 |
| Electronic Gaming Monthly | 8.5/10 | N/A |
| EP Daily | 8/10 | N/A |
| Eurogamer | N/A | 8/10 |
| Famitsu | 39/40 | N/A |
| Game Informer | 7.25/10 | N/A |
| GameFan | (AC) 100% (AC2) 98% 97% (Note: In GameFan's viewpoint of the Dreamcast version's Japanese import, three critics gave it each a score of 98, 99, and 95.) | N/A |
| GameRevolution | B | B− |
| GameSpot | (JP) 8.4/10 (US) 8.1/10 | 7.5/10 |
| GameSpy | 7.5/10 | N/A |
| IGN | (JP) 9.3/10 (US) 8/10 | 7.5/10 |
| Next Generation | 3/5 | N/A |
| Teletext GameCentral | N/A | 7/10 |

The Dreamcast version received favorable reviews, while Ver.5.66 received "average" reviews, according to the review aggregation websites GameRankings and Metacritic. Stephen Frost of NextGen called the Japanese import of the Dreamcast version "an impressive game, and practically a perfect conversion, marred by difficult controls and a lack of 'compatibility' with the standard Dreamcast controller. However, if you're willing to invest the necessary time, you'll eventually discover that the game provides one of the most addictive and deep gaming experiences currently available on Dreamcast." Jake The Snake of GamePro said in one review, "For dedicated gamers longing for a fast-paced clast of metal, Virtual-On: Oratorio Tangram will deliver many hours of mech-smashing mayhem." (Note: GamePro gave the Dreamcast version 4.5/5 for graphics, two 4/5 scores for sound and fun factor, and 3.5/5 for control in one review.) In another review, Cheat Monkey called it "a must buy-if you have the Twin Sticks. If not, the game will still be fun, but it will not feel quite right to arcade veterans." (Note: GamePro gave the Dreamcast version two 4.5/5 scores for graphics and fun factor, 4/5 for sound, and 3/5 for control.) GameZone gave the same Dreamcast version seven out of ten, saying, "If there were Twinsticks or cerebral implants available in the US for use with the Dreamcast, then it would have scored higher. As it stands, it's another in a long series of arcade games that have been shoehorned onto a console to make a buck." Later, Retro Gamer gave the Xbox 360 version 72%, calling it "a great port of the DC conversion [that] looks incredible with its hi-def sheen, but the 360's analogue stick just doesn't do the game justice."

In Japan, Famitsu gave the same Dreamcast version a score of three tens and one nine for a total of 39 out of 40. Game Machine listed the arcade version in their May 15, 1998 issue as the second most-successful dedicated arcade game of the month.

The Dreamcast version was a runner-up for the "Game No One Played" award at IGN's Best of 2000 Awards.
