= Jitsu Squad =

2022 video game

- Developer: Tanuki Creative Studio
- Publishers: Tanuki Creative Studio; ININ Games (consoles)
- Director: Dave Baljon
- Designers: Dave Baljon; Sebastien Romero; Pieter Visser
- Programmers: Pieter Visser; Akli Lounés Touati
- Artist: Laurent Romero
- Writer: Dave Baljon
- Composer: Sebastien Romero
- Engine: GameMaker
- Platforms: Microsoft Windows; Nintendo Switch; PlayStation 4; PlayStation 5; Xbox One; Xbox Series X/S
- Release: March 29, 2022: Microsoft Windows; March 29, 2022; Switch, PS4, PS5, Xbox One, Xbox Series X/S; December 9, 2022; Arcade (JS featuring SPC); December 27, 2024
- Genre: Beat 'em up
- Modes: Single-player, multiplayer
- Arcade system: exA-Arcadia

Jitsu Squad is a 2022 beat 'em up indie video game self-developed and published by Tanuki Creative Studio for Microsoft Windows, and published by ININ Games for home consoles. The game was released on March 29, 2022, for Windows, which was followed by console releases for Nintendo Switch, PlayStation 4, PlayStation 5, Xbox One and Xbox Series X/S, on December 9.

== Development ==
Jitsu Squad is developed by Tanuki Creative Studio, an independent game company from the Netherlands.

Development on the game began in 2015 and over the years had two successful Kickstarter campaigns. YouTuber Maximilian Dood and the titular Yooka-Laylee characters, Yooka and Laylee, appear as cameo extras in the game. Several mechanics in the game, such as "Fury Mode" and "big burst attacks", were inspired by works such as Samurai Pizza Cats and Dragon Ball respectively. There were plans of a "Survival" mode and having the character Dash Kobayashi, the first boss of the game, to be a fifth playable character. None, however, were panned out into further update patches as Tanuki Creative Studio rebranded as Blast Zero in 2024 and are working on their next project Samurai Pizza Cats: Blast from the Past!

=== Audio ===
Sebastien Romero serves as the game composer. Johnny Gioeli, the lead vocalist of Crush 40, provided vocals on 3 tracks, one of which was "Surfing on the Lava". The other two was its opening theme, "Go! Fight! Jitsu Dreamers!", and its closing theme, "Into the Heart of the Sun".

== Reception ==
Reception

Aggregate score
Aggregator	Score
Metacritic	(Switch) 70/100

Review scores
Publication	Score
Nintendo Life	7/10
TouchArcade	7.5/10

Jitsu Squad received "mixed or average" from critics, according to review aggregator Metacritic.

Scott McCrae from Nintendo Life scored the game a 7 out of 10, praising the "great art style and music" and being "a love letter to '90s Capcom classics" whilst critiquing that it has "performance issues" and is a bit too "short, even for a beat 'em up". In TouchArcade, Shaun Musgrave rated it a 7.5, highlighting its "cartoonish graphics" and "fast action", but felt that there was little "technique" to go off of and that the unlockable tag-team mode was not available from the get-go.

=== Accolades ===
Date	Award	Category	Result	Ref.
October 6, 2022	Dutch Game Awards	Best Debut Game	Nominated	
October 6, 2022	Dutch Game Awards	Best Art	Nominated	

== Legacy ==
In 2024, exA-Arcadia released an arcade port of the game, titled Jitsu Squad featuring Samurai Pizza Cats. It features the character Speedy Cerviche as a fifth playable character, with Kappei Yamaguchi reprising the role. The game was previously unveiled at the Amusement Expo in Las Vegas.
