= Hajime Katoki =

Japanese mechanical designer

- Born: Hajime Kato (加藤 一, Katō Hajime); December 3, 1963 (age 62); Saitama Prefecture, Japan
- Other names: Sunawo Katoki
- Occupation: Mecha designer
- Known for: Gundam; Super Robot Wars; Virtual On

Hajime Katoki (カトキ ハジメ, Katoki Hajime; born December 3, 1963) is a Japanese mecha designer. A member of the studio Sunrise, he worked on the Gundam series as well as his work on video games, such as the Virtual On series and Policenauts.

== Biography ==
Born in 1963, Katoki created designs for the graphic novel Gundam Sentinel. He then worked in the OVA series Gundam 0083, where he designed the majority of the mobile suits in the series, including the RX-78GP03 Gundam Dendrobium Stamen and Orchis mobile weapons. His next prominent work was V Gundam, where he was the main mechanical designer, creating the main mobile suits Victory Gundam, V2 Gundam and the V2 Assault Buster Gundam. After that, he worked on G Gundam, now in design of the antagonist mobile suits. His next work was on Gundam Wing, where most of the enemy mobile suits, including the popular Tallgeese, were designed by him. He also created the mobile suits designs for Gundam Wing: Endless Waltz, and re-designed the Gundams with a more fantastic style, creating the XXXG-00W0 Wing Gundam Zero EW. To correspond with these new designs, he also redesigned the 5 original Gundams from Gundam Wing.

Katoki also has worked in Super Robot Wars and Virtual On video games, and in the Patlabor 2 movie. He also collaborates quite frequently with Bandai, often doing touch-up designs for the Master Grade model kits and production of the Gundam fix figuration (G.F.F.) series action figures. He is also working with the company to develop a subcategory of the Robot Damashii mecha action figure line, called the Ka Signature line.

In his art book, Gundam Fix, Katoki said: "Do people, like myself, spend time imagining what it would be like if Gundam robots were actually present on the streets of our cities? Are you sure you're not limiting yourself to the images that were offered in the animated series? One of the reasons that I fell in love with Gundam was that it excites me to imagine what it would be like if these machines actually existed, and I worry that other fans may be losing out..." He said he hopes his work will catch peoples' attention"...then people who had never before been drawn in by the magic of these giant robots may discover their attraction for the first time."

== Credited series/works ==
=== Super Robot Wars series ===
- 4th Super Robot Wars
- Super Robot Wars Gaiden: Masō Kishin – The Lord Of Elemental
- Shin Super Robot Wars
- Super Robot Wars F
- Super Robot Wars F Final
- Super Robot Wars Complete Box
- Super Robot Wars Alpha
- Super Robot Wars Alpha For Dreamcast
- Super Robot Wars Alpha Gaiden
- Super Robot Taisen: Original Generation
- 2nd Super Robot Wars Alpha
- Super Robot Taisen: Original Generation 2
- 3rd Super Robot Wars Alpha: To the End of the Galaxy
- Super Robot Wars: Original Generations
- Super Robot Wars Original Generation: The Animation
- Super Robot Wars Original Generation: Divine Wars
- Super Robot Wars Original Generation Gaiden

=== Gundam series ===
- Gundam Sentinel
  - Gundam Sentinel 0079 (unofficial series)
- Mobile Suit Gundam 0083: Stardust Memory
- Mobile Suit Gundam 0083: The Last Blitz of Zeon
- Mobile Suit Victory Gundam
- Mobile Fighter G Gundam
- Mobile Suit Crossbone Gundam
- Gundam Fix
- Mobile Suit Gundam Wing
- Mobile Suit Gundam: The 08th MS Team
- New Mobile Report Gundam Wing: Operation Meteor
- Gundam Wing: Endless Waltz
- Gundam Evolve (Episode 4 and 7)
- Superior Defender Gundam Force
- Mobile Suit Gundam MS IGLOO
- Mobile Suit Gundam Unicorn
- Mobile Suit Gundam Hathaway
- Master Grade
  - RX-78-2 Gundam Ver.Ka
  - XXXG-01W Wing Gundam Ver.Ka
  - RB-79 Ball Ver.Ka
  - XM-X1 Crossbone Gundam X-1 Ver.Ka
    - XM-X1 Crossbone Gundam X-2 Ver.Ka
    - XM-X1 Crossbone Gundam X-3 Ver.Ka
  - RX-0 Unicorn Gundam Ver.Ka
  - RX-0 Full Armor Unicorn Gundam Ver.Ka
  - MSN-06S Sinanju Ver.Ka
    - MSN-06S Sinanju Stein Ver.Ka
    - MSN-06S-2 Sinanju Stein (NARRATIVE Ver.) Ver.Ka
  - LM312V04 Victory Gundam Ver.Ka
    - LM312V04(B-part) + SD-VB03A Core Booster Ver.Ka
    - LM312V04 V-Dash Gundam Ver.Ka
  - RX-93 Nu Gundam Ver.Ka
  - MSN-04 Sazabi Ver.Ka
  - RX-93-v2 Hi-Nu Gundam Ver.Ka
  - FA-78 Full Armor Gundam Ver.Ka
  - MS-06R High Mobility Type Zaku II 'Psycho Zaku' Ver.Ka
  - MSZ-010 ΖΖ Gundam Ver.Ka
  - RX-0 Unicorn Gundam 02 Banshee Ver. Ka
  - FA-010A FAZZ Ver. Ka
  - XXG-00W0 Wing Gundam Zero Ver. Ka
  - MSZ-006 Zeta Gundam Ver. Ka
  - RX-9 Narrative Gundam Ver. Ka
- Ka Signature collection in Robot Damashii (Spirits) action figure line

- RX-160S Byarlant Custom
- MS-05 Zaku I Sniper Yonem Kirks Custom
- MSA-005K Guncannon DT (Detector)
- AMX-014 Doven Wolf and Doven Wolf Silver Bullet

=== Virtual On series ===
- Virtual On: Cyber Troopers
- Cyber Troopers Virtual-On One Man Rescue
- Cyber Troopers Virtual-On Oratorio Tangram
  - Cyber Troopers Virtual-On One Man Rescue
- Cyber Troopers Virtual-On Force
  - Cyber Troopers Virtual-On Fragmentary Passage
- Cyber Troopers Virtual-On Marz

=== Other works ===
- The Hatsune Miku Robot Suit
- Patlabor: The Movie 2
- WXIII: Patlabor the Movie 3
- Sgt. Frog (manga, anime episode 38 and 73)
- Chogekijyouban Kerorogunso 2: Shinkai no Princess dearimasu! (also known as Sgt. Frog The Super Movie 2)
- The Cockpit
- Xardion
- Welcome to the N.H.K. (Episode 24)
- Gradius II (manual art for the X68000 version)
- Policenauts (designs for the EMPS mecha)
- Super Robot Spirit
- Real Robots Final Attack
- Super Hero Operations
- Short Peace (A Farewell to Weapons)
- Composite Ver. Ka
  - Z-01Z Lancelot Albion Ver.Ka
  - Type 0/0A Shinkiro Ver. Ka
  - Gurren Lagann Ver.Ka
  - Temjin Ver.Ka
  - PTX-EX Exbein
- Girls und Panzer: This Is the Real Anzio Battle! (storyboards)
- Aikatsu! (ep.122 storyboards)
- Delicious Party Pretty Cure (ep.5 storyboards)
- Encouragement of Climb: Next Summit (ep.3 scenario & storyboards)

He was also involved in the color scheme design of Toyota Team Kraft's SC430 (#35, GT500) which participated in Super GT seasons in 2006 and 2007. His colour scheme was later replaced by Gundam Exia-like colour scheme in July 2007 (race 5 in 2007 season) as a promotion project of Mobile Suit Gundam 00, one of the most recent Gundam Series.
