= Samurai Pizza Cats: Blast from the Past! =

Upcoming video game

- Developer: Blast Zero
- Publishers: Red Dunes Games; SOTSU - Tatsunoko Productions
- Writer: Satoru Akahori
- Platforms: Windows; Epic Games Store; Steam; Console
- Release: WW: 2027
- Genre: Action role-playing
- Mode: Single-player

Samurai Pizza Cats: Blast from the Past! is an upcoming action role-playing video game developed by Blast Zero, and published by Red Dunes Games. Based on the 1990 animated series Samurai Pizza Cats, the game is scheduled for a 2027 release on Windows and home consoles.

== Development ==
Samurai Pizza Cats: Blast from the Past! is developed by Blast Zero, an independent game development studio from the Netherlands. The Rotterdam-based studio previously made the 2022 beat 'em up game Jitsu Squad under its former name, Tanuki Creative Studio.

On the 35-year anniversary commemoration of Samurai Pizza Cats in February 2025, it was announced that the game is set for a 2026 launch for Windows and all major home consoles. The game has since been delayed to 2027. Nearly all of the English and Japanese actors will return to reprise their roles, with the exception of the character Guido Anchovy, who will be voiced by Seiichiro Yamashita in Japanese instead of the original actor Jūrōta Kosugi. Original series head writer Satoru Akahori will also return for the game as script supervisor.

== Cast ==
=== Japanese ===
- Kappei Yamaguchi (Yattarō)
- Seiichirō Yamashita (Sukashī)
- Ai Orikasa (Pururun)
- Satomi Kōrogi (Otama)
- Ikuya Sawaki (Kitsunezuka Ko'on-no-Kami)
- Naoki Tatsuta (Karasu Gennarisai)
- Kōichi Yamadera (Karamaru)
- Kenyu Horiuchi (Narrator)

=== English ===
- Rick Jones (Speedy Cerviche)
- Terrence Scammell (Guido Anchovy & Narrator)
- Dean Hagopian (The Big Cheese)
- Sonja Ball (Polly Esther)
