= Xardion =

1992 video game

- Japanese cover art
- Developer: Jorudan
- Publisher: Asmik
- Director: Hiroshi Okamoto
- Producer: Shinji Ogawa
- Composer: Kohei Tanaka
- Platform: Super NES
- Release: JP: March 20, 1992; NA: April 1992
- Genre: Platform
- Mode: Single-player

Xardion (超攻合神サーディオン, Chou Kou Gasshin Sādion; lit. "Super Attack God Xardion") is a platform game where the player controls robots with different skills in order to defeat the enemy and reach goals.

== Story ==
The inhabitants of the three worlds in the Alpha 1 Solar System have been at war for seven months before hostilities upon the threat of invaders from the artificial world NGC-1611. The Alpha 1 Federation has gathered together the system's best defenses in an effort to repel the invasion. Two mechas and a self-aware robot are dispatched to NGC-1611, charged with the task of destroying the invaders' power source and, if possible, locate the legendary weapon, Xardion, in the process.

=== The History of NGC-1611 ===
Planet NGC-1611 is a typical world in all ways, omitting that it was constructed from raw materials by an unnamed scientist. His desire was to create a planet which could not die. His work was dubbed "Project New Frontier." The project was a failure, and violent monsters rapidly evolved, making NGC-1611 uninhabitable by humans. The scientist's final instructions to the supercomputers that once managed the planet were: "Protect my daughter! Eliminate all intruders."

However, the scientist's daughter died after these instructions were given. The supercomputers, not knowing how to proceed with their directive, eventually found a holographic image of the scientist's daughter and projected it into a protective capsule. They chose to defend that capsule in place of the actual girl. Sometime after, an undisclosed event or chain of events lead the supercomputers to send an invasion to the Alpha 1 system.

== Characters ==
Three champions, one from each planet, were sent to NGC-1611. Two pilots operate two transforming mecha, with a space fighter in story scenes and a giant robot in gameplay. The third is a self-aware A.I. robot that has similar two forms, as well. The player picks which one to use each with its own special talents and weapons.

- Triton - Humanoid. Carries a rifle and can fire upward.
- Alcedes - Beast Bot/Mage that resembles a humanoid/insect and has four arms. Carries a staff. Fires a small laser projectile from its antenna.
- Panthera - Catlike. Quadrupedal robot, can avoid danger more easily, but cannot jump as high as Triton or Alcedes. Is able to get into small spaces that the others cannot. Shoots a blast from head-mounted guns.
- Xardion - The ultimate mecha cyborg. Xardion is gained later in the game, and replaces Panthera after the latter gets destroyed by concentrated hydrochloric acid in NGC-1611. Fires a blast from its arm appendage.

== Gameplay ==
While possessing the typical qualities of action platformers at the time it was made (jump, duck, shoot etc.), Xardion made use of a few novel elements. Additionally, the game had a role-playing element where experience points could be accrued by defeating enemies and bosses, and each level up increased the player's maximum life and special ability points.

During the game, the player takes control of one of three available robot forms. Each form represents one of the three inhabited worlds in the system: Alcedes, from Fiera; Triton, from Oceansphere, and Panthera, from Hollowsphere.

Each form has its own particular abilities and weaknesses. For example, Panthera is less than half the height of the others and, as such, can enter narrow passages to collect items. Additionally, each form possesses its own health and special ability points, and must be upgraded separately from the others. This is equivalent to a 'tag team' game mechanic, where one heavily damaged character can be swapped instantly for another.

Eventually, one of the robot forms is replaced by Xardion, which combines the abilities of all three previous forms and exceeds them. Xardion only becomes available near the end of the game, but joins the team at level one. An obstruction that can only be cleared by a sufficiently-leveled Xardion forces the player to return to earlier levels in order to gain levels and develop special abilities.

== Development and release ==
The game's main mecha designs were designed by Moriki Yasuhiro, who also worked on designing Zeorymer for the OAV Hades Project Zeorymer and Hajime Katoki, who created major designs of the Mobile Suits from the Gundam franchise. Animation studio Gainax also provided input on the game.

The game was released in Japan on March 20, 1992. It was released in North America in April 1992. The English script was written by Robert Woodhead, who had previously worked on the Wizardry series.

== Reception ==
Reception

Review scores
Publication	Score
AllGame	3/5
Electronic Gaming Monthly	4/10, 8/10, 5/10, 7/10
Famitsu	5/10, 6/10, 6/10, 4/10
Game Informer	6.5/10, 7/10, 6.75/10
Game Players	6/10
Super Play	4/10
Total!	27%
VideoGames & Computer Entertainment	7/10
The Super Famicom	5/10
Super Pro	76%

Xardion received a 20.46/30 score in a 1993 readers' poll conducted by Super Famicom Magazine, ranking among Super Famicom titles at the number 165 spot. The game received mixed reception from critics.
