= Cyber Troopers Virtual-On Marz =

3D action-adventure game by Sega

Cyber Troopers Virtual-On MARZ
- North American (English dub) cover art for the game.
- Developer: Hitmaker
- Publisher: Sega
- Director: Nobuyuki Yamashita
- Producer: Mie Kumagai
- Programmer: Yoshifumi Ishihata
- Artist: Hajime Katoki
- Composers: Takenobu Mitsuyoshi; Kentaro Koyama
- Series: Virtual On
- Platforms: PlayStation 2 PlayStation Network
- Release: PlayStation 2: JP: May 29, 2003; NA: October 14, 2003; PlayStation Network: JP: March 21, 2013
- Genre: Action-adventure
- Modes: Single-player, multiplayer

Cyber Troopers Virtual-On MARZ (電脳戦機バーチャロン マーズ, Dennō Senki Bācharon Māzu) is a 2003 3D mecha action-adventure game developed by Hitmaker and published by Sega. The game was first released on the PlayStation 2 in North America and Japan, and is the fourth game in the Virtual On franchise. MARZ expands upon the basic gameplay rules of Virtual-On Force, and reuses most of the game's assets; from the stages down to models of the Virtuaroids, the game's enemies.

It was re-released on the PlayStation 3 in Japan on March 21, 2013, to commemorate the game's tenth anniversary.

== Plot ==
Mars, once a peaceful society, has deteriorated into a planet of war. Shady corporations have deployed giant robots called Virtuaroids to cause chaos around the planet for their nefarious gain.

As part of the Marz Special Investigation Unit, the player must take control of their own robots (armed with a variety of explosive weaponry) and lay waste to the Virtuaroid enemy in battle.

Battling their way through hordes of Virtuaroid armies, the Marz Special Investigation Unit must find out who this shady corporation is and end the chaos on Mars, once and for all.

== Gameplay ==
Virtual-On Marz retains the Twin Stick control layout of the series, mapping the two sticks to the analogue sticks on the DualShock controller, and the turbo and weapon buttons to the four L and R buttons.

A new Auto controller layout was provided, as well as several variants for players who did not like the twin-stick format.

The match rules follow that of Virtual-On: Force, that is two-on-two matches with a leader on each team. Fallen teammates can be given half the other's life gauge through the "rescue tag" maneuver, and the first pair to fall loses the round.

The "Challenge Mode" is a single match setup that is akin to a stage in Virtual-On: Force, with the player tagged with an NPC partner against two other NPC opponents or bosses.

New to the PlayStation 2, Marz is the "Dramatic Mode" which is a story mode with a linear sequence of missions with various objectives such as exploration, target destruction, beat 'em up, and boss battles. When certain requirements are met, such as passing certain stages, or destroying a number of certain Virtuaroids in "beat 'em up missions", new Virtuaroids are open for selection and play in the other modes.

A split-screen two-player mode is available, with the choice of playing on the same team or against each other.

In the Japanese version, the Database mode is available, and the databases can be collected through the Dramatic Mode. These databases include stories, characters, and items associated with them. Some of the databases include a description of the particular subjects. This mode is not available in the English localization of the game.

== Characters ==
The following characters are non-playable characters that appear in the single-player Dramatic and Challenge modes, of the game. In gameplay, they are controlled by the computer. Most of the non-playable characters were created for use in the game, although some of them come from previous games in the Virtual-On franchise, some with minor alterations.

Apharmd "Hatter": A wild and energetic Virtuaroid that the player saves earlier in the game. He constantly helps the player during some missions in the game.

Temjin "White Knight": The most powerful Temjin model in the game. He's found in the middle of the game, searching for Shadow VR's, VR's infected by a virus that makes them get colored in Red/Black. In their First Meeting, he tests the player to discover If their VR is MARS or a Shadow. Then he helps them in their journey until they reach the last stage of Earth, where they fight against their own Shadow VR.

"Rose Trio" Cyphers: They are female VRs the player fights during some missions on Mars and Earth. When the player defeats them, Jennifer Poison, one of the Cyphers gives the player an item that allows them to reach the boss of the stage. They don't like Apharmd Hatter due to his wild personality after he said the players should not trust them.

The pilots of the Special Virtuaroids are taken from novelizations of the Virtual-On franchise; such as One Man Rescue and Fragmentary Passage. These Special Virtuaroids can be unlocked if a player meets certain requirements.

== Reception ==
Reception

Aggregate score
Aggregator	Score
Metacritic	54/100

Review scores
Publication	Score
1Up.com	4/10
Edge	7/10
Famitsu	33/40
Game Informer	5/10
GameSpot	6.3/10
GameSpy	2/5
GameZone	6.2/10
IGN	4.8/10
Official U.S. PlayStation Magazine	2/5
PlayStation: The Official Magazine	5/10

The game received "mixed or average " reviews according to the review aggregation website Metacritic. In Japan, however, Famitsu gave it a score of 33 out of 40.

As of March 2021, Cyber Troopers Virtual-On MARZ is the most recent game in the Virtual-On franchise (except for a Japan-exclusive crossover game with novel series A Certain Magical Index). In 2004, Sega reintegrated Hitmaker back into their own company, re-establishing its previous identity prior to 2000, Sega AM3. The studio was dissolved and merged into other departments in 2009.

On 8 January 2016, American business magazine Forbes published an article speaking to Sega employee Mayu Koike, saying that the company currently have no plans of publishing any new Virtual-On games. This makes MARZ, for the time being, the final standalone Virtual-On game.
