= Virtual On: Cyber Troopers =

1996 video game

Cyber Troopers Virtual-On
- Japanese arcade flyer
- Developer: Sega AM3
- Publisher: Sega
- Series: Virtual On
- Platforms: Arcade, Sega Saturn, Windows, PlayStation 2, PlayStation 4
- Release: January 1996: Arcade; JP: January 1996; EU: January 1996; NA: May 1996 Saturn; NA: November 8, 1996; JP: November 29, 1996; EU: January 1997 Windows; JP: June 13, 1997; NA: September 10, 1997 PlayStation 4; JP: November 27, 2019
- Genres: Action, shooter, fighting
- Modes: Single-player, multiplayer
- Arcade system: Sega Model 2

Cyber Troopers Virtual-On (電脳戦機バーチャロン, Dennō Senki Bācharon) is a 3D action video game developed and published by Sega. A robot-themed shooter and fighter, it was developed on the Sega Model 2 hardware and released on arcades in January 1996 (or December 1995) before ports to the Sega Saturn that year and to Windows the next year. Initially the game was to be released under the title "Virtual-On" in Japan and "Cyber Troopers" in North America, but ultimately these two names were combined into a single title for both regions.

There were also two-player online versions of the game released in America and Japan for the Sega Saturn using the NetLink and XBAND services respectively. A twin stick controller was developed and released for the Saturn specifically to be used with Virtual On. The game was popular especially in Japan and it led to the Virtual On franchise and a 1998 sequel subtitled Oratorio Tangram. In 2007, Cyber Troopers Virtual-On was remade for the PlayStation 2 and released in Japan, while later in 2013 the original version was released on Xbox Live Arcade and PlayStation Network, also in Japan only.

== Gameplay ==
Gameplay screenshot (Sega Saturn)

Virtual-On is set up similar to a Versus fighting game. Two Virtuaroids (Mecha) face each other on a stage. The player(s) use a variety of firearms, explosives, melee weapons, and other techniques to destroy the enemy for a set number of rounds, usually a single battle, or best two out of three rounds, like fighting games.

The game is made to be played with a two-joystick setup, known as the twin-sticks. Each stick is equipped with a trigger and a button on top of the stick.

The twin sticks control the Virtuaroid on screen much like a bulldozer. Pushing or pulling both sticks in one direction makes it move in that direction, while pushing one stick forward and pulling the other back makes it turn in the forward direction. Pulling the sticks apart causes the Virtuaroid to jump into the air, and automatically turn to face the opponent. Pulling them towards each other while pulling a trigger causes the Virtuaroid to prone while firing.

The top buttons are Turbo buttons. Pressing a Turbo button while moving causes the Virtuaroid to dash for a few seconds. Dashing is used to avoid enemy fire, or to maneuver quickly around the map. Virtuaroids can fire while dashing. While dash-firing, as with during a jump, the Virtuaroid turns to face the enemy before shooting.

Each Virtuaroid is armed with three weapons, which are different for each Virtuaroid. Two of those weapons are associated with either the left or the right trigger, and are referred to as the Left Weapon (LW) and Right Weapon (RW) respectively. The Right Weapon is generally a Virtuaroid's main weapon, usually a rifle or gun. The Left Weapon is commonly a support weapon, often an explosive. Left weapons usually have a blast radius and can inflict splash damage even if they miss the target directly. The third weapon is called the Center Weapon (CW), and is activated by pulling both triggers simultaneously. Depending on the selected Virtuaroid, a Center Weapon attack can be extremely powerful, but can only be used a few times in a row before they run out of energy. Each weapon's size, power, and rate of fire is varied by the Virtuaroid's actions when the player pulls the trigger. For example, a standing Temjin's RW is a single shot from its rifle, but while dashing, the RW unleashes a rapid burst of shots at once. While dashing, the Virtuaroid's direction may also have an effect on the attack.

== Story ==
The game is set in a dystopian future in which Earth is controlled by corporate syndicates. People eager to break free of their rule colonize other planets. On one of these colonies is discovered a powerful technology used by an extinct race. One of the corporate syndicates, DN, reverse-engineers the technology and uses it to design battle robots called Virtuaroids. While testing this new technology, the central computer at the test complex becomes self-aware and activates the Sun Cannon, intending to use it to destroy civilization. DN assigns their top personnel to take control of several Virtuaroids and use them to shut down the rogue computer.

== Development and release ==
The arcade and Saturn versions were both developed by Sega AM3, though not by the same team. The decision to convert the game to the Saturn was made in response to player feedback.

Producer Juro Watari described the conversion to Saturn as more difficult and frustrating than the more typical fighting games due to, among other things, the large size of the arenas and the numerous projectiles used by the fighters. As an example of the difficulties the team faced, he recounted that "the robot Raiden fires a laser but we really had our work cut out trying to figure out how we were going to represent the laser because its radius is so big. At first there was a delay when we tried to draw it on the screen so we had to rewrite it several times." The team used their own custom operating system to develop the conversion rather than the Sega Graphics Library. Because the Saturn cannot generate as many polygons per second as the Model 2 hardware, the polygonal backgrounds were replaced with scrolling images.

Rumors which state that an early version of the Virtual-On arcade version was planned to use the VR-1 headset also circulate - though these are not confirmed, the MVD design is incorporated into the Virtuaroids of the game.

A remake was released for the PlayStation 2 on October 25, 2007, as part of the Sega Ages 2500 line, featuring improved framerates, music and additional features not found in the original versions. The original game was also rereleased on Xbox Live Arcade and PlayStation Network as a part of the Sega Model 2 Collection in 2012 in Japan only. In 2018 Sega announced that they would be releasing the game for the PlayStation 4.

== Reception ==
Reception

Review scores
Publication	Score
AllGame	4.5/5 (SAT)
Computer and Video Games	5/5 (SAT)
Electronic Gaming Monthly	8/10, 8/10, 9/10, 6.5/10 (SAT)
Famitsu	8/10, 8/10, 8/10, 8/10 (SAT)
GameSpot	5.4/10 (SAT)
Next Generation	4/5 (ARC, SAT)
Sega Saturn Magazine	93% (SAT)

In Japan, Game Machine listed Cyber Troopers Virtual-On on their March 1, 1996 issue as being the most-successful dedicated arcade game of the month. The game was not popular in U.S. arcades. In Hong Kong, HK01 journalist Chung Sai-kit recalled that although the arcade version of Virtual On was available at only a handful of local amusement arcades, enthusiasts gathered to play it every evening.

In a December 1995 GamesMaster preview of the arcade game, Dominik Diamond called Virtual-On "a futuristic version of the old Gun Fight game." Reviewing the arcade version, a Next Generation critic described the game as "phenomenally intriguing". He found the use of full three-dimensional movement, heat-seeking projectiles, and defensive sprints to be strong innovations which set the game above rival Namco's Cyber Sled. He additionally praised the 60 frames per second frame rate, quick-moving camera, use of robots as combatants, and dynamic combat strategies, and expressed concern that US gamers would pass by the game due to its distinctively Japanese character designs and initially confusing up-close combat.

The Saturn version was widely held to be an extremely accurate translation of the arcade version, but critics were divided about the game itself. One issue was the controls, which most critics said take adjusting to unless the twin sticks controller is used, and a reviewer for Next Generation pointed out that this was an expensive option, since Virtual-On would in all likelihood be the only game to support the peripheral. Unlike most reviewers, GamePro's The Rookie said the game looks and sounds "16-bit", though he felt it offered enough fun to be worth trying as a rental. However, the main point of disagreement was the gameplay. Next Generation, Rich Leadbetter of Sega Saturn Magazine, and Shawn Smith and Crispin Boyer of Electronic Gaming Monthly all said that while the game is deceptively simple, it offers numerous possibilities for sophisticated and cerebral tactics in the heat of combat. On the other side, Jeff Gerstmann of GameSpot and Dan Hsu and Sushi-X of Electronic Gaming Monthly all found the game shallow and mindless due to the small number of moves and the availability of homing attacks. Gerstmann elaborated that while Virtual On made a good arcade game, it was ill-suited for console release, since the lack of depth prevents it from holding the player's interest for more than a few minutes. Next Generation summarized, "When considering Virtual-On for Saturn, it's important to remember just a few things. First, it's a very nontraditional action/fighting game, which means it won't instantly appeal to everyone. Second, those who do like this game tend to like it a lot, and for good reason."
