= Samurai Pizza Cats =

Japanese anime television series

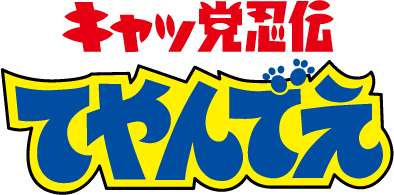
- キャッ党忍伝てやんでえ
- Genre: Comedy; Action-adventure
- Created by: Gō Mihara
- Developed by: Mayori Sekijima; Satoru Akahori
- Directed by: Kunitoshi Okajima (chief)
- Music by: Kenji Kawai
- Country of origin: Japan
- Original language: Japanese
- No. of episodes: 54

Production
- Executive producer: Ippei Kuri
- Producers: Mitsuo Shimizu (TV Tokyo); Masakatsu Kozuru (Sotsu Agency); Motoki Ueda (Tatsunoko)
- Production companies: TV Tokyo; Sotsu Agency; Tatsunoko Production

Original release
- Network: TXN (TV Tokyo)
- Release: February 1, 1990 – February 12, 1991

Related
- Video game
- Developer: Tecmo
- Publisher: Tecmo
- Genre: Action-platform
- Platform: Family Computer
- Released: July 19, 1991
- Video game
- Samurai Pizza Cats: Blast from the Past!

Samurai Pizza Cats (キャッ党忍伝てやんでえ, Kyattō Ninden Teyandē; lit. "Cat-Party Ninja Legend What the Heck?" or "Legendary Ninja Cats" according to the Crunchyroll release) is a Japanese anime series produced by Tatsunoko Production. The series originally aired in Japan on TV Tokyo from February 1, 1990, to February 12, 1991, for a total of 54 episodes. The creators stated that there was going to be a spin-off series, Kyatto Keisatsu Beranmee (キャッ党警察べらんめえ, Kyattō Keisatsu Beranmē; lit. "Cat Police You Fool!"). The series is known for its cultural humor consisting of Japanese puns, pop culture, and fourth-wall breaking.

Saban Entertainment picked up the North American rights to the series in 1991 and produced a 52-episode English adaptation.

The dub initially aired on YTV in Canada in 1992–1993, then later aired in US syndication in 1996–1997. Saban's distribution rights to the series expired on November 12, 2000. Crunchyroll began streaming the series in North America on December 27, 2015.

== Plot ==
The series is set in Little Tokyo (Edoropolis, a portmanteau of "Edo" and "metropolis"), a mechanical city that fuses feudal Japanese culture with contemporary culture populated by cybernetic anthropomorphic "animaloids" (or animal androids). The city is notionally led by shōgun Empreror Fred (Iei-Iei Tokugawa), but as he is a doddering eccentric, the actual leadership is in the hands of his neurotic daughter Tokugawa Usako and a council. The council is headed by the ambitious prime minister Seymour "The Big" Cheese (Kitsunezuka Koon-no-Kami), a rat (fox in the Japanese version) who constantly plots to overthrow the Shogun with the help of his trusted advisor Jerry Atric (Karasu Gennari-sai), and Bad Bird (Karamaru), the leader of an army of ninja crows.

Unknown to the prime minister, council member Big Al-Dente (Inuyama Wanko-no-Kami), the commander of the Palace Guard, learns of his designs on leadership, but is unable to prosecute him for treason because of his plausible deniability. Instead, Inuyama enlists the services of Speedy Cerviche (Yattarou), Polly Esther (Pururun) and Guido Anchovy (Sukashii), cat ninjas who work in the city's pizzeria with their operator, Francine (Otama). Known collectively as the Samurai Pizza Cats (Nyankī, a play on the Japanese word for a cat's meow and the term "Yankee"), they are assigned to stop The Big Cheese and his evil henchmen's plans to take over Little Tokyo.

== Production and release ==
=== English-language version ===
When Saban licensed the Japanese version, they learned that because the show hadn't performed well in Japan, Tatsunoko had not preserved the original production documents. This led to the localization team being handed scripts that were either translated poorly, not translated at all, or missing entirely. The writers essentially had to assemble a show out of 54 episodes of raw Japanese footage and what little production materials they did have. However, they were also relatively unrestricted in how they produced the dub and chose to make it more blatantly comedic with contemporary pop culture references, puns, meta-jokes, sardonic humor, and fourth wall breaks in almost every episode. Script writer and voice actor Michael McConnohie commented in response to a fan question about the production: "There were no chains upon us. We were free to look at it and say 'That would be funny... that might work... we'll do that! Who's gonna tell us not to?'"

The theme song contains the line "As soon as someone finds the script, we might begin the show", a reference to the lack of proper translations given to Saban for production on the American version.

The English version of the series first aired in the United Kingdom on ITV on August 31, 1991, with repeats continuing until 1995. In Canada, the series first appeared in 1992, on YTV, and in 1996, in the United States, on first-run syndication. The series was broadcast on Australian television on the weekday Seven Network morning kid's wrapper programme Agro's Cartoon Connection, from April 1992. A repeat run occurred in the same time slot in early 1994.

Madman Entertainment released the show on DVD in Australia initially in two collections, with four discs in each set. Collection 1, containing episodes 1–26, was released on October 16, 2013; collection 2 containing episodes 27–52, was released on December 4, 2013. A box set of the complete series was released by Madman on April 6, 2016.

In 2012–2013, Discotek Media announced the release of the show in both the original Japanese-language version and the North American English-language version dubbed by Saban. DVDs were released in region 1 format, with the Japanese version in Dolby Stereo 2.0 and English version in Dolby Digital Mono. The Kyatto-Ninden Teyandee: Complete Uncut Japanese Language Collection was released on April 30, 2013, and the English-dubbed version, Samurai Pizza Cats: Complete English Language TV Series Collection – 8 Disc Set, was released on July 30, 2013. The Kyatto-Ninden Teyandee: Complete Uncut Japanese Language Collection set includes all of the 54 original episodes (including the two clip-show episodes that were never dubbed into English) while the Samurai Pizza Cats: Complete English Language TV Series Collection set includes all 52 English-dubbed episodes.

A Blu-ray version, titled Samurai Pizza Cats: The Complete Collection, was released on January 19, 2016. This release featured every episode in standard definition on a single disc. As of 2022, it has since gone out of print.

A remastered HD Blu-ray of the English dub, simply titled Samurai Pizza Cats, which was slated to be release in October 2026, but is currently delayed.

== Music ==
The incidental music was composed by Kenji Kawai. The opening theme was titled "A Time for Beautiful Days" (おっとどっこい日本晴れ, Ottodokkoi Nihonbare)) while the ending theme was titled "To Be Yourself", both performed by Reina Yazawa. Ami Itabashi, the singer of the ending song of the Macross OVAs, sang the insert songs.

=== Soundtracks ===
Kyatto Ninden Teyandee: The Cats' First Performance

Compilation album by Kenji Kawai
- Released: September 21, 1990
- Recorded: 1990
- Genre: soundtrack
- Label: Starchild Records
- Producer: Kenji Kawai

A soundtrack CD titled Kyatto Ninden Teyandee: The Cats' First Performance (キャッ党忍伝てやんでえ 猫座第一回公演, Kyattō Ninden Teyandē: Nekoza Dai Ichi Kai Kōen; lit. 'Cat Ninja Legend Teyandee: The Cats' First Performance') was released on September 21, 1990.

No.	Title	Lyrics	Music	Length
1.	"初級おEDO講座番外編"		Kenyu Horiuchi	1:04
2.	"おっとどっこい日本晴れ" (Sung by Reina Yazawa)	Anju Mana	Etsuko Yamakawa	2:38
3.	"秘密忍者隊ニャンキー参上！"		Kenji Kawai	4:30
4.	"コーン守と幻ナリ斎のアホ企み"		Kenji Kawai	3:59
5.	"初級おEDO講座1 カラス長屋の夜は更けて..."		Voice Actors	6:52
6.	"腹がへってもヤッ太郎"		Kenji Kawai	3:58
7.	"YASU－けくナイ！" (Sung by Ai Orikasa and Yuki Mizutani (MIPPLE))		Kenji Kawai	4:25
8.	"商売繁盛ピザキャット"		Kenji Kawai	3:14
9.	"ざ・らいばる（カラ丸VSニャンキー）"		Kenji Kawai	4:20
10.	"初級おEDO講座2 リアリズムへの長き道"		Voice Actors	2:39
11.	"メカEDO城危機一髪！ぱふー"		Kenji Kawai	2:32
12.	"必殺！猫目スラッシュ"		Kenji Kawai	3:42
13.	"一富士二鷹三ナスビ"		Kenji Kawai	2:36
14.	"初級おEDO講座3 正しいピザの頼み方の傾向と対策"		Voice Actors	9:01
15.	"To be Yourself" (Sung by Reina Yazawa)	Anju Mana	Etsuko Yamakawa	3:24
Total length:				48:56

Kyatto Ninden Teyandee: The Cats' Final Performance Day

Compilation album by Kenji Kawai
- Released: December 21, 1990
- Recorded: 1990
- Genre: soundtrack
- Length: 48:56
- Label: Starchild
- Producer: Kenji Kawai

A second soundtrack CD, Kyatto Ninden Teyandee: The Cats' Final Performance Day (キャッ党忍伝てやんでえ 猫座千秋楽公演, Kyattō Ninden Teyandē: Nekoza Senshūraku Kai Kōen; lit. 'Cat Ninja Legend Teyandee: The Cats' Final Performance Day') was released on December 21, 1990.

No.	Title	Lyrics	Music	Length
1.	"おっとどっこい日本晴れ（ウサ姫Version）" (Sung by Maria Kawamura)	Anju Mana	Etsuko Yamakawa	2:42
2.	"三日月コネクッション" (Sung by Ai Orikasa and Yuki Mizutani (MIPPLE))		Kenji Kawai	2:38
3.	"てやんでえ Special Express" (Sung by Ami Itabashi)		Kenji Kawai	4:30
4.	"Black Fight" (Sung by Koichi Yamadera)		Kenji Kawai	3:59
5.	"艶姿メカCat！" (Sung by Jurouta Kosugi)		Kenji Kawai	6:52
6.	"Battle in Flash" (Sung by Ami Itabashi)		Kenji Kawai	3:58
7.	"天下無敵のヤッ太郎" (Sung by Kappei Yamaguchi)		Kenji Kawai	4:25
8.	"To be Yourself（プルルン Version）" (Sung by Ai Orikasa)	Anju Mana	Kenji Kawai	3:14
9.	"おっとどっこい日本晴れ（TV サイズ）" (Sung by Reina Yazawa)	Anju Mana	Kenji Kawai	4:20
10.	"（音楽劇場・其の一）"		Kenji Kawai	2:39
11.	"（音楽劇場・其の二）"		Kenji Kawai	2:32
12.	"（音楽劇場・其の三）"		Kenji Kawai	3:42
13.	"（音楽劇場・其の四）"		Kenji Kawai	2:36
14.	"（音楽劇場・其の五）"		Kenji Kawai	9:01
15.	"（音楽劇場・其の六）"		Kenji Kawai	3:24
16.	"（音楽劇場・其の七）"		Kenji Kawai	0:56
17.	"（音楽劇場・其の八）"		Kenji Kawai	2:59
18.	"To be Yourself（TV サイズ）" (Sung by Reina Yazawa)	Anju Mana		3:11
Total length:				48:56

== Merchandise ==
=== Video games ===
In 1991, Tecmo (now known as Koei Tecmo) published a video game based on the anime for the Nintendo Famicom. It was officially released in Japan only but was bootlegged outside Japan as Ninja Cat. Although the game was never officially released in the West, an English fan-translation (with characters' names and places adapted to those from the Samurai Pizza Cats dub) is available via a fan-made ROM patch. Two standalone handheld LSI games (similar to Nintendo's Game & Watch) were also made by Bandai ("Launch! Yattaro" and "Yattaro appears").

Players take the role of the three main cats and Otasuke members, who can be switched to at any time and have special abilities to progress through the game. The game features most of the characters in the series as well as an additional villain, a mysterious scientist named Dr. Purple (Dr. パープ) who shows up later on in the game and appears to ally with Koon-no-Kami.

The main characters were considered at one point to appear in the Wii fighting game Tatsunoko vs. Capcom: Ultimate All-Stars. The game's producer, Ryota Niitsuma, was quoted in an interview as saying: "One of the main anime we got more requests for than any others was Samurai Pizza Cats... I wanted to see that, but we couldn't reach an agreement."

Speedy is also playable with Guido and Polly as supports in the arcade version of the game Jitsu Squad that was unveiled in Amusement Expo 2024 in Las Vegas.

An action-platformer role-playing video game, known as Samurai Pizza Cats: Blast from the Past!, is currently under development. Developed by Blast Zero and published by Red Dunes Games, the game is slated for a 2027 release on Windows and all major home consoles. Almost all of the show's English and Japanese cast is set to reprise their roles, with the known exception of Guido Anchovy (Sukashi), who will be voiced by Seiichiro Yamashita in Japanese.

=== Home video releases ===
Some episodes were released on video in Japan, but a complete release of the show was held up for many years owing to poor sales. It was rumored that the lack of a DVD release was due to the original masters of some episodes being lost, but this proved not to be the case. Starchild Records released the complete series on DVD in Japan on August 8, 2012, as part of a commemoration of the 50th anniversary of Tatsunoko. The limited edition set sold well, placing second in the national animation DVD sales charts the week of its release.

The series was released on Blu-ray in Japan on February 25, 2026.

In North America, Discotek Media announced on March 12, 2012, that they had licensed the home video rights to the series with plans to release both the original Japanese version with English subtitles and Saban's English dub in separate box sets for each version. The Japanese language box set was released on April 30, 2013, while the English dubbed version was released on July 30, 2013.

On May 16, 2016, anime streaming service Crunchyroll began streaming the show under license from Discotek with improved quality subtitles for at least six episodes while the rest used the DVD footage. As of May 23, 2016, all 54 episodes are available for free users.

On August 1, 2026, Discotek Media announced a new Blu-ray release of the series' English dub with remastered HD video footage and recreated titling will release later that same year, with a new release of the Japanese original slated for a later date.

=== Toys ===
Toys and model kits were released in Japan and Europe by Bandai, the latter usually being reboxed versions of the prior. Action figures were made for the Nyanki and the Otasuke (the Japanese originals came as model kits while the European figures came pre-assembled). There were large and small (Gachapon-sized), rubber-like figures, as well as playsets for the smaller figures, including the Nyago King and the pizza parlor.

=== Manga ===
A tie-in manga by Yoshimi Hamada was serialized in Comic BomBom in 1990. A sequel manga that took place after the end of the television series was released in 1994. The manga was made by Tatsuya Souma.

=== Comic books ===
Samurai Pizza Cats comics were released as back-up stories in Saban Powerhouse (published by Valiant/Acclaim) which ran for two issues in 1997. In August 2025, it was announced a graphic novel series is currently in the works from Nakama Press and Mad Cave Studios. The first volume was set to be published on April 7, 2026, but was delayed to August 25, 2026, and then delayed to October 13, 2026, and was further delayed to December 8, 2026.

== Other appearances ==
- In the 4th episode of the Tatsunoko magical girl parody anime Nurse Witch Komugi-chan R, Komugi Nakahara is at a ninja-themed festival taking a picture of her family behind a standee of the Nyankee. Komugi shouts "Himitsu Ninja Tai" and her family responds "Nyankee".
- Yattarou makes an appearance as a playable character in the video game, Jitsu Squad. Pururun and Sukashii also make an appearance as his assist characters.
