= Masaaki Endoh =

Japanese singer-songwriter

Masaaki Endoh 遠藤 正明
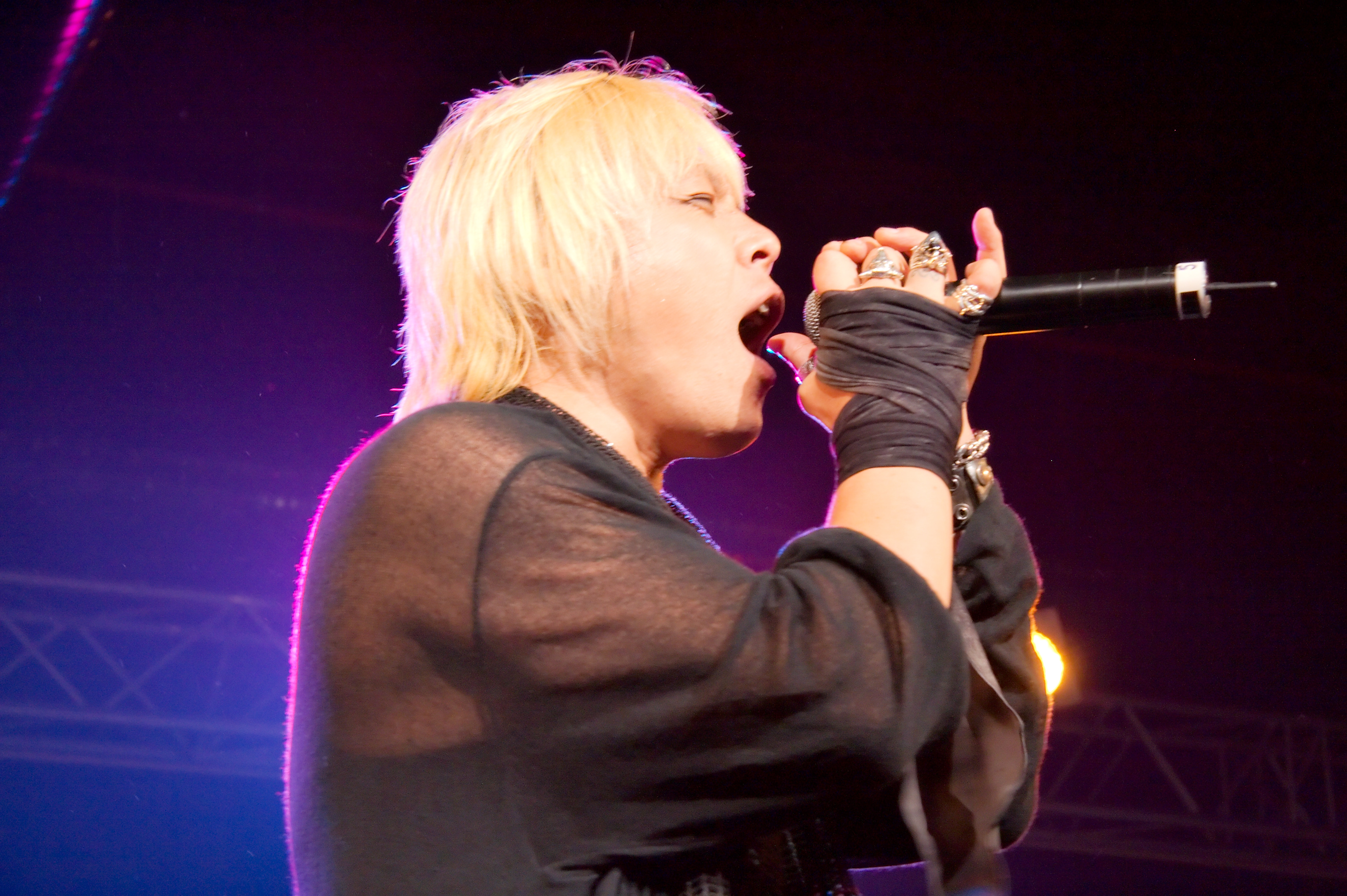
- Masaaki Endoh performing as part of JAM Project in Paris

Background information
- Born: August 28, 1967 (age 59); Ishinomaki, Miyagi, Japan
- Genres: Rock
- Occupation: Singer-songwriter
- Instruments: Vocals, guitar
- Years active: 1993–present
- Labels: Solid Vox, Lantis
- Website: http://www.endoh-masaaki.com/

Masaaki Endoh (遠藤正明, Endō Masaaki; born August 28, 1967) is a Japanese singer-songwriter who is prominent in the area of soundtracks for anime and tokusatsu productions. He is one of the founders of the Anison band JAM Project and has been a regular member ever since its inception in 2000. His nickname is the "Young Lion of Anison" and he goes by the motto "Always Full Voice".

Endoh took the industry by storm when he released the two Enson albums and the subsequent third, in which he covered many famous anime theme songs. Due to their success, Endoh went on to sing signature songs with the respective artists, such as "Arashi no Naka de Kagayaite" with Chihiro Yonekura, "Sousei no Aquarion" with Akino, "Butter-Fly" with Kōji Wada, "Bakuryū Sentai Abaranger" with Hideyuki Takahashi from Project.R, "Eternal Blaze" with Nana Mizuki, "Yuzurenai Negai" with Naomi Tamura, "Pegasus Fantasy" with NoB, "Makka na Chikai" with Yoshiki Fukuyama, "Kimi Taiyou ga Shinda Hi" with Maon Kurosaki, "SERIOUS-AGE" with Faylan, "We Are" with Hiroshi Kitadani, "KINGS" with Angela, "DREAM SOLISTER" with True, and "UNINSTALL" with Chiaki Ishikawa.

== Career ==
=== Early years ===
Masaaki Endoh was born in the Miyagi Prefecture on August 28, 1967. After graduating from high school, he joined a group called The Hiptones, but after it dissolved in 1993, he became half of the acoustic duo Short Hopes. In 1995, music producer Shunji Inoue approached Endoh for a record deal, and he debuted as a solo artist. In this time, he also worked as Steeple Jack with other musicians, and they also released two albums before disbanding.

He sang some opening themes for anime until two years later, he and Hironobu Kageyama joined together to form the Metal Brothers. This duo only lasted from 1997 to 1998, when the group broke apart. During this time, he released an album, and formed the musical act Blind Pig with two other musicians. The group released two rock albums before they disbanded.

=== JAM Project ===
In 2000, Ichirou Mizuki gathered four artists to form JAM Project: Masaaki Endoh, Eizo Sakamoto, Rica Matsumoto, and Hironobu Kageyama. Vocally, Endoh specializes in sustained high notes, covering the upper male range. Some of the songs he wrote for the group include "SAMURAI PARTY" on THUMB RISE AGAIN, "Kimi no Moto he" on X cures Earth, and "WE ARE ONE" on AREA Z.~

Endoh often stars in songs that have very long notes or extremely high notes. Examples include "Hagane no Messiah" (鋼の救世主(メシア), Hagane no Kyūseishu; "Steel Messiah") which has a twenty-second note and "Seventh Explosion", twenty-five seconds.

=== 2000s ===
Masaaki Endoh enjoyed moderate success from 2000 to 2003, when he released his first studio album, Chakuriku!!. At around the same time, he sang the opening for Bakuryuu Sentai Abaranger, for which he gained much popularity. After its success, he halted singing opening themes to focus more on JAM Project.

By 2006, he released his second album M.e. and followed by a concert organized by Lantis to promote the release. The album included Carry On and CLOWN, which were also released on the soundtrack for the series Muv-Luv. Masaaki Endoh released ENSON and ENSON2 in the summer of 2008, which proved to be a massive success. The album contained covers of popular anime opening themes in the late 1990s and early 2000s, including "Uninstall" by Chiaki Ishikawa and "Sousei no Aquarion" by Akino.

In 2009, he returned to singing opening themes. He followed up with the release of his third studio album, Circus Man. He introduced the concept of him being a circus show performer, the cover showing his face with clown makeups. A concert was organized but never released as home media.

=== 2010s ===
In May 2010, he participated in Yu-Gi-Oh! 5D'S, the third series in the Yu-Gi-Oh! franchise, starting with its fourth opening, "Believe in Nexus". Following this, he released an insert single, "Clear Mind", for the show's soundtrack. Later in December, he released a third single for the show, being the fifth and final opening, "Asu e no Michi ~Going my way!!~" (明日への道〜Going my way!!〜, The Road to Tomorrow ~Going my way!!~) on the same day JAM Project released their 10th Anniversary BOX. He appeared in Hironobu Kageyama's 2011 Live Birthday concert with other JAM Project members. In 2011, he formed SV Tribe with Hiroshi Kitadani and Aki Misato and the group continues to write and perform opening music for many anime series.

In July 2012, he released his fourth studio album (e)-STYLE and promoted the album by touring Japan for three nights from July 24 to August 6, 2011. For the release, the YouTube channel of Lantis released a set of videos showing Masaaki Endoh breaking down the lyrics of each song on the record. In the summer of 2011, he joined JAM Project in Animelo as a returning regular performer. He also participated in the Type-Moon 10th anniversary by singing "Fellows".

To celebrate Christmas in 2010, Masaaki Endoh performed five concerts from November 11 to December 24 titled "Christmas Acoustic Night 2010 ~present of the voice~" that contained acoustic songs across his albums and covers. In December 2012, he performed three more concerts under the title "Christmas Acoustic Night 2012 ~present of the voice~" for three nights from the 2nd to the 23rd. The tradition continued in 2013; while on tour with JAM Project for their latest album, he took Christmas Eve to perform a single live show called "Christmas Acoustic Night2013 ~present of the voice~".

He released his fifth studio album in August 2013, and went on a live tour titled "Masaaki Endoh Live Tour 2013 ~Extreme V Machine~" in September 2013 to promote the album. He explained that the "V" stands for "voice" on his Extreme V Machine live tour, as well as signifying the number 5 in Roman numerals. In spring 2014, he formed a small group called "Endoh-kai" to sing the opening theme of Kenzen Robo Daimidaler and Lantis launched a small campaign to promote the group.

In November 2014, Endoh released his first acoustic album called Present of the Voice, containing several arrangements of his signature songs. A campaign to promote the album requested fans send in photos which would be shown while the track my beloved played. In 2015, he released the third ENSON album, which followed the previous iterations with more covers of famous theme songs.

He released his sixth studio album in February 2017, this time with a more steampunk and robotic approach to some of the songs. In 2018, he released his first single in six years for the Angels of Death anime adaptation. In December 2018, he released the follow-up to Present of the Voice with Present of the Voice 2. The album contained arrangements of "Vital" and "Bakuryuu Sentai Abaranger" along with his original songs.

== Discography ==
=== Albums ===
1. Chakuriku!!
  - Released on November 27, 2003 / LACA-5220 / Lantis
2. M.e.
  - Released on November 29, 2006 / LACA-5577 / Lantis
3. Circus Man
  - Released on April 29, 2009 / LACA-5901 / Lantis
4. (e)-Style
  - Released on July 6, 2011 / LACA-15127 / Solid Vox
5. Extreme V Machine
  - Released on August 7, 2013 / LACA-15327 / Solid Vox
6. Present of the Voice
  - Released on November 5, 2014 / LACA-15460 / Solid Vox
7. V6 Engine
  - Released on February 1, 2017 / LACA-15596 / Lantis

=== Compilation Works ===
1. ENSON ～Cover Songs Collection Vol.1～
  - Released on June 11, 2008 / LACA-5774 / Lantis
2. ENSON2 ～Cover Songs Collection Vol.2～
  - Released on December 17, 2008 / LACA-5826 / Lantis
3. ENSON3 ～Cover Songs Collection Vol.3～
  - Released on October 7, 2015 / LACA-55510 / Lantis

=== Miscellaneous ===
1. Best Anisongs Vol.01
  - Contains many of his older singles and several covers.
2. Blind Pig and Blind Pig II
  - Albums that were released under his short-lived group.
3. Star Generation
  - A project with other anison artists for an anime.
4. Strykers
  - Dengeki Stryker soundtrack.
5. Ko Bu Shi – Tekken – Theme Song Album
  - Game soundtrack with Hironobu Kageyama, Masami Okui, Faylan, and others.

=== Collaborations ===
1. [2002.02.06] Akogi na futaritabi daze!! LIVE ALBUM – Dai 1 Shou
  - Hironobu Kageyama & Masaaki Endoh collaboration tour
2. [2011.10.09] U-n-d-e-r—standing!
  - Opening with SV Tribe for the anime series Majikoi.
3. [2012.12.05] Jounetsu Element
  - Opening with SV Tribe for the anime series Monsuno.
4. [2013.02.06] Ultraman Taro Rock Ver
  - Opening with Chihiro Yonekura for the tokusatsu series Ultraman Taro.
5. [2014.03.26] V-ANIME collaboration -homme-
  - His version of Yuusha Ou Tanjou featuring Nightmare.
6. [2014.04.23] Kenzen Robo Daimidaler
  - Sung as part of "Endoh-kai".
7. [2015.12.02] TANSON – Tank Song Mini album

=== DVD/Blu-Ray ===
1. [2011.11.09] (e)-Style Live Tour DVD
2. [2014.03.26] Extreme V Machine Live Tour DVD
3. [2017.10.27] Masaaki Endo Live Tour 2017 – V6 Enjin

=== Singles ===
1. [1995.11.11] Forever Friends
2. [1996.07.24] Killed by Beak Spider
3. [1997.02.21] Yuusha Ou Tanjou! (勇者王誕生!) (GaoGaiGar Theme)
4. [1997.08.21] A Piece of the Sun
5. [1998.11.21] Ano kawa wo koete (あの河を越えて)
6. [1999.03.03] Ready, B-Fight
7. [1999.06.21] Senshi yo, Tachiagare! (戦士よ、起ち上がれ！)
8. [2000.01.01] Yuusha Ou Tanjou! (Mythology Version)" (勇者王誕生！-神話(マイソロジー)バージョン-) (GaoGaiGar FINAL Theme)
9. [2000.08.23] eX-Driver -Sniper- (With Milk)
10. [2002.04.20] Bakutou Sengen! Daigunder ( 爆闘宣言！ダイガンダー)
11. [2003.03.01] Bakuryuu Sentai Abaranger (爆竜戦隊アバレンジャー)
12. [2009.07.01] Sea Jetter Kaito (シージェッター海斗)
13. [2009.09.25] Kankyou Choujin Ecogainder (環境超人エコガインダー)
14. [2010.05.12] Believe in Nexus (Yu-Gi-Oh! 5Ds Theme 4)
15. [2010.09.22] Saigo no Eden (With Aki Misato)
16. [2010.12.22] Asu e no Michi ~going my way! (明日への道～Going my way!) (Yu-Gi-Oh! 5Ds Theme 5)
17. [2011.01.11] Honki Sentai Gachi Ranger (本気戦隊ガチレンジャー)
18. [2011.05.11] Tamashii meramera Itchodo (魂メラめら一兆°C)
19. [2011.11.09] Fellows
20. [2012.01.11] Kankyou Choujin Ecogainder 0X (環境超人エコガインダー0X)
21. [2018.07.25] Vital/Pray
22. [2020.08.05] Goshowa Kudasai Ware no Na wo! (ご唱和ください 我の名を！)
23. [2024.04.03] Bakuage Sentai Boonboomger (爆上戦隊ブンブンジャー)
24. [2025] Kinnikuman Hero
