= Enson (album) =

Album by Masaaki Endoh

Enson (stylized as ENSON) is an album by Japanese J-pop and anison artist Masaaki Endoh of JAM Project. In this album, and its follow up Enson2 (stylized as ENSON2), Endoh covers theme songs from multiple anime, tokusatsu, and video games. During its 3 weeks on the Oricon Weekly Album Charts, the first album peaked at #43, selling 6,383 copies. The second album remained on the charts for 6 weeks and peaked at #50.

== ENSON track list ==
ENSON

Compilation album by Masaaki Endoh
- Released: June 11, 2008
- Genre: J-pop/Anison
- Label: Lantis

Masaaki Endoh chronology
M.e. (2006)	ENSON (2008)	ENSON2 (2008)

1. "Genesis of Aquarion" (創聖のアクエリオン, Sōsei no Akuerion; originally by Akino) from Genesis of Aquarion
2. "Butter-Fly" (originally by Kōji Wada) from Digimon Adventure
3. "Arashi no Naka de Kagayaite" (嵐の中で輝いて; originally by Chihiro Yonekura) from Mobile Suit Gundam: The 08th MS Team
4. "Muv-Luv" (マブラヴ, Maburavu; originally by Minami Kuribayashi) from Muv-Luv
5. "Kimi ga Tame" (キミガタメ, Kimi ga Tame; originally by Suara) from Utawarerumono: Chiriyuku Mono e no Komoriuta
6. "Ai o Torimodose!!" (originally by Crystal King) from Fist of the North Star
7. "Go Go Power Rangers" (originally by The Mighty RAW) from Mighty Morphin Power Rangers
8. "Kimi ga Sora Datta" (君が空だった, Kimi ga Sora Datta; originally by Aki Misato) from My-HiME
9. "Asu e no Brilliant Road" (明日へのbrilliant road, Asu e no buririanto rōdo; originally by angela) from Stellvia of the Universe
10. "In the Chaos" (originally by JAM Project featuring Masami Okui) from Galaxy Angel A
11. "Mononoke Hime" (もののけ姫; originally by Yoshikazu Mera) from Princess Mononoke
12. "Wing of Destiny" (originally by Maho Tomita) from Galaxy Angel II Zettai Ryōiki no Tobira
13. "Ano Kawa o Koete" (あの河を越えて; self-cover) from Hamos The Green Chariot

== ENSON2 track list ==
ENSON2

Compilation album by Masaaki Endoh
- Released: December 17, 2008
- Genre: J-pop/Anison
- Label: Lantis

Masaaki Endoh chronology
ENSON (2008)	ENSON2 (2008)	Circus Man (2009)

1. "Eternal Blaze" (originally by Nana Mizuki) from Magical Girl Lyrical Nanoha A's
2. "Uninstall" (アンインストール, An'insutōru; originally by Chiaki Ishikawa) from Bokurano: Ours
3. "Sorairo Days" (空色デイズ, Sorairo Deizu; originally by Shoko Nakagawa) from Gurren Lagann
4. "Yuzurenai Negai" (ゆずれない願い, Yuzurenai Negai; originally by Naomi Tamura) from Magic Knight Rayearth
5. "Tori no Uta" (鳥の詩, Tori no Uta; originally by Lia) from Air
6. "Kinnikuman Go Fight!" (キン肉マンGo Fight!, Kinnikuman Gō Faito!; originally by Akira Kushida) from Kinnikuman
7. "Go Tight!" (originally by Akino) from Genesis of Aquarion
8. "Yatsura no Ashioto no Ballade" (やつらの足音のバラード, Yatsura no Ashioto no Barādo; originally by The Gyatols) from Hajime Ningen Gyatols
9. "God Knows..." (originally by Aya Hirano) from The Melancholy of Haruhi Suzumiya
10. "Ultra Seven no Uta" (ウルトラセブンの歌, Urutorasebun no Uta; originally by the Misuzu Children's Choral Group) from Ultra Seven
11. "Sketch Switch" (スケッチスイッチ, Suketchi Suitchi; originally by Kana Asumi, Kaori Mizuhashi, Ryōko Shintani, and Yūko Gotō) from Hidamari Sketch
12. "The Galaxy Express 999" (銀河鉄道999（The Galaxy Express 999）, Ginga Tetsudō Surī Nain (The Galaxy Express 999); originally by Godiego) from The Galaxy Express 999
13. "Good-bye to Yesterday" (self-cover) from Cybuster

== ENSON3 track list ==
ENSON3

Compilation album by Masaaki Endoh
- Released: October 7, 2015
- Genre: J-pop/Anison
- Label: Lantis

Masaaki Endoh chronology
Present of the Voice (2014)	ENSON3 (2015)

1. "Kimi no Shiranai Monogatari" (originally by Supercell) from Bakemonogatari
2. "Kasabuta" (originally by Chiwata Hidenori) from Konjiki no Gash Bell
3. "Ojamajo Carnival" (originally by Maho-Do) from Ojamajo Doremi
4. "Eiyuu" (originally by doa) from Ultraman Nexus
5. "Snow Halation" (originally by μ's) from Love Live! School Idol Project
6. "Dream Solister" (originally by TRUE) from Sound! Euphonium
7. "Pegasus Fantasy" (originally by Make-Up) from Saint Seiya
8. "Bokutachi no Yukue" (originally by Hitomi Takahashi) from Gundam SEED Destiny
9. "My Soul, Your Beats" (originally by Lia) from Angel Beats
10. "Kimi ga Suki da to Sakebitai" (originally by Baad) from Slam Dunk
11. "Good bye, Good Luck" (originally by Totalfat) from Naruto: Shōnen Hen
12. "Orion wo Nazoru" (originally by Unison Square Garden) from Tiger & Bunny
13. "Mata Ashita" (self-cover) from Honki Sentai Gachiranger
