= Chakuriku!! =

Studio album by Masaaki Endoh
- Released: November 27, 2003
- Genres: J-pop; rock
- Length: 58:48
- Label: Lantis

Masaaki Endoh chronology
| Akogi na Futaritabi Daze!! Dai 1 Shō (2002) | Chakuriku!! (2003) | M.E. (2006) |

Chakuriku!! is the first album by Masaaki Endoh. It was released on November 27, 2003, by Lantis.

== Production ==
Endoh wrote several songs for the album, besides including other renowned ones, like the Cybuster opening "Senshi yo, Tachiagare!". Try Force (a group made up of Hironobu Kageyama, Kenichi Sudo, Yoshichika Kuriyama and Make-Up's Yohgo Kohno) was involved in the production. A limited edition containing a DVD with the "Zettai Mutetsu no GO Fighter" music video and its making-of was released. This song was written by Kohei Tanaka, the same composer of One Piece's first opening, "We Are!".

The album also contains the song "Ticket to the Paradise", opening theme for the TV series Anipara Ongakukan, where Endoh was a co-host along Kageyama.

== Reception ==
CD Journal said the album is "unmissable, full of the power and versatility of a talented singer". Chakuriku!! reached the 223rd place on Oricon Albums Chart.

== Track listing ==
Chakuriku! track listing
| No. | Title | Lyrics | Music | Arrangement | Length |
|---|---|---|---|---|---|
| 1. | "Kanzenmuketu no Go Fighter!! (Theme of Endoh)" | Masaaki Endoh | Kohei Tanaka | Yohgo Kohno | 5:08 |
| 2. | "Ai no Manifest" | Haruko Momoi | H. Momoi | Y. Kohno | 4:19 |
| 3. | "Dokuritsu Kinenbi (Nu Tōhoku Higashikita Sengen!!)" | M. Endoh e Hironobu Kageyama | M. Endoh e H. Kageyama | Yoshichika Kuriyama | 5:19 |
| 4. | "Going" | Psychic Lover's Yoffy | Yoffy | Y. Kohno | 5:02 |
| 5. | "Shōbai Hanjō!!" | Tsuyoshi Tamai and Kenji Yamamoto | Y. Kohno | Y. Kohno | 4:34 |
| 6. | "Oath (Chikai)" (with RM-01) | H. Kageyama | Y. Kohno | Y. Kohno | 4:30 |
| 7. | "White Breath" | M. Endoh and H. Kageyama | Yoffy | | 5:16 |
| 8. | "Ticket to the Paradise" (Anipara Ongakukan OP theme) | H. Kageyama | H. Kageyama | Kenichi Sudo | 6:18 |
| 9. | "This Is the Endoh (Not the End)" | H. Kageyama | Y. Kohno | Y. Kohno e Y. Kuriyama | 4:52 |
| 10. | "Jewel" | Masami Okui | K. Sudo | K. Sudo | 5:26 |
| 11. | "Happy Ice Cream" (with JAM Project) | M. Okui | Yoshiki Fukuyama | Y. Kohno | 4:05 |
| 12. | "Senshi yo, Tachiagare!" (Cybuster OP theme) | Tetsuo Kudo | Manzo | K. Sudo | 5:09 |
| Total length: | | | | | 58:48 |
