= Mutant Turtles: Superman Legend =

Japanese TMNT Original Video Animation

- Cover of the first VHS cassette

ミュータントタートルズ 超人伝説編 (Myūtanto Tātoruzu: Chōjin Densetsu-hen)
- Genre: Superhero; Adventure; Science fiction Comedy
- Original video animation
- Directed by: Shunji Oga
- Produced by: Hideyuki Kachi; Kōzō Itagaki; Taro Maki
- Written by: Masashi Sogo
- Music by: Takeshi Ike
- Studio: Bee Media; Tsuburaya Productions
- Released: May 21, 1996
- Runtime: 25 minutes
- Episodes: 2
- icon

Mutant Turtles: Superman Legend (Japanese: ミュータントタートルズ 超人伝説編, Hepburn: Myūtanto Tātoruzu: Chōjin Densetsu-hen) is a Japanese original video animation based on the Teenage Mutant Ninja Turtles franchise. The first episode is based on the Supermutants line while the second episode is based on the Metal Mutation line. The OVA was produced by Bee Media and Tsuburaya Productions. The OVA features most of the same cast as TV Tokyo's Japanese dub of the 1987 TV series, most notably Hideyuki Umezu.

== Voice cast ==
- Daiki Nakamura as Leonardo
- Toshiharu Sakurai as Michelangelo
- Hidenari Ugaki as Donatello
- Hiroyuki Shibamoto as Raphael
- Hideyuki Umezu as Splinter and Krang
- Emi Shinohara as April O'Neil
- Kiyoyuki Yanada as Saki Oroku / Shredder
- Kyousei Tsukui as Bebop
- Hidetoshi Nakamura as Rocksteady
- Rei Sakuma as Crys-Mu / Dark Mu
- Tomohiro Nishimura as Hattori Kinzô
- Kōichi Nagano as News Technician

== Episode list ==
No.	Title	Original release date
1	"The Great Crisis of the Super Turtles! The Saint Appears!" "Sūpā Tātoruzu Dai Pinchi! Seinto Tōjō!" (スーパータートルズ大ピンチ! セイント登場!)	May 21, 1996
The Turtles explore the temple of the lost Muta Kingdom where they free the spirit of light called Crys-Mu, who was trapped inside the Muta Stone. In reward, she gives the Turtles the ability to perform Super Mutation, which transforms them into Super Turtles for three minutes. When all four Super Turtles combine into one, they fuse into the all-mighty Turtle Saint. At the same time, Shredder and Krang find the Dark Muta Stone, and they try to awaken the demoness Dark Mu contained inside the crystal.
2	"The Coming of the Guardian Beasts – The Metal Turtles Appear!" "Shugo Jū Kōrin – Metaru Tātoruzu Tōjō!" (守護獣降臨 メタルタートルズ登場!)	May 21, 1996
The Turtles, along with April and Splinter, travel to Japan in order to help Kinzou Hattori get rid of a ghost haunting the Hattori House. At the same time, Shredder, Bebop and Rocksteady teleport themselves to Japan in order to steal the Tablet of the Seven Elements, so they can gain the powers of the Guardian Beasts.

== Music ==
=== Soundtrack ===
Mutant Turtles: Superman Legend Original Sound Track

Soundtrack album by Takashi Ike
- Released: March 20, 1996 (COCC-13260)
- Genres: Score, Anison
- Length: 28:04
- Language: Japanese
- Label: Columbia Records

Mutant Turtles: Superman Legend Original Sound Track (ミュータント・タートルズ超人伝説編 オリジナル・サウンド・トラック, Myūtanto Tātoruzu: Chōjin Densetsu-hen Orijinaru Saundo Torakku) is the licensed soundtrack from the OAV. It was released by Columbia Records on March 19, 1996, in Japan only. This album includes the score from both episodes by composer Takashi Ike. Also included is the opening theme "Power Up Turtles" and the closing theme "Chikyū wa Ogenki" by Hironobu Kageyama and "Mokkun" respectively.

==== Track list ====
1. パワーアップ・タートルズ~オープニング・テーマ・ビデオサイズ
  Pawā Appu Tātoruzu~Ōpuningu Tēma Bideo Saizu/Power Up Turtles: Opening Theme Video Size
2. 戦いのはじまり~ダーク・ミューの驚異
  Tatakai no Hajimari~Dāku Myū no Kyô/Start to Wage War: Dark Mu's Miracle
3. ダーク・ミューの目覚め
  Dāku Myū no Mezame/Awakening of Dark Mu
4. 負けるなスーパータートルズ!~セイントミューテーションでタートルセイント!!
  Makeru na Sūpā Tātoruzu!~Seinto Myūtēshon de Tātoruzu Seinto/Defeated Super Turtles!: The Saint Mutation of the Turtle Saint!!
5. クリス・ミュー決死の封印~力をあわせてメガファイナルセイントブレイクを打て!!
  Kurisu Myū Ketsu Shi no Fūin~Ryoku o awase te Mega Fainaru Seinto Bureiku o Ute!!/Crys Mu Decides the Seal's Death: The Combined Power Mega Final Saint Break Strike Shoots!!
6. 美雄平石(ミュータ石)を求め,いざ日本へ~ハットリキンゾウ参上!
  Bi Osu Hira Ishi(Myūta Seki) wo Motome, Iza Nihon e~Hattori Kinzô Sôjyô/The Beautiful Flat Male Animal Stones (Mutant Stones) Demand, to Japan in a Crucial Moment: Hattori Kinzô Visits!
7. 亡霊ユキムラのいたずら
  Bôrei Yukimura no Itazura/Failed Attempt of Ghost Yukimura
8. 大苦戦!お先に失礼,メタルビーストはいただきさ!!
  Dai Kusen! Osaki ni Shitsurei, Metaru Bīsuto ha Itadaki sa!!/Big, Hard Fight! Before Rudeness, the Metal Beast is Received!
9. 守護獣降臨!メタルミューテーション!!
  Shugo jū Kôrin! Metaru Myūtēshon!!/Protect the Beast Descending to Attend! Metal Mutation!!
10. 地球はお元気~エンディング・テーマ・ビデオサイズ
  Chikyū wa Ogenki~Endingu Tēma Bideo Saizu/The Earth is Safe: Ending Theme Video Size
