= Tusk of Jaguar =

Studio album by Akira Takasaki
- Released: April 1, 1982
- Studio: Nippon Columbia Studio, Studio Birdman, Tokyo, Japan
- Genre: Progressive rock, hard rock, heavy metal
- Length: 40:00
- Label: Columbia
- Producer: Daiko Nagato, Masanori Sasaji, Akira Takasaki

Akira Takasaki chronology
Tusk of Jaguar (1982)	Ki (1994)

Professional ratings
Review scores
Source	Rating
AllMusic	4/5 stars
Collector's Guide to Heavy Metal	5/10

Tusk of Jaguar is the debut solo studio album by Japanese guitarist Akira Takasaki, renowned for his contributions to the rock bands Loudness and Lazy. Initially released in 1982 exclusively in Japan, it was reissued in 2005. The album represents a collaborative effort between Takasaki and keyboard player Masanori Sasaji, who composed three tracks and played a crucial role in arranging and co-producing the recording. A large contribution was given to the album by Takasaki's bandmates in Loudness, who play on most tracks and collaborated on the musical arrangements. However, the music of Tusk of Jaguar is much more varied than in any Loudness' album, with its music ranging from hard rock to progressive rock to jazz fusion, reminiscing of some Dixie Dregs' and Al Di Meola's works. The precise and fast guitar playing by Takasaki is anyway always present in every track, and he even takes the lead vocal spot in the song "Ebony Eyes".

== Track listing ==
Side one

1. "Tusk of Jaguar" (Akira Takasaki) - 3:54
2. "Steal Away" (Masanori Sasaji, Milky Way) - 6:13
3. "Macula (Far from Mother Land)" (Takasaki) - 4:46
4. "Ebony Eyes" (Takasaki, Milky Way) - 5:31

Side two

1. "Wild Boogie Run" (Sasaji) - 3:17
2. "Gunshots" (Takasaki) - 3:07
3. "Mid-Day Hunter" (Sasaji) - 4:28
4. "Show Me Something Good" (Takasaki, Milky Way) - 4:59
5. "Say What?" (Takasaki, Milky Way) - 3:44

== Personnel ==
=== Musicians ===
- Akira Takasaki - electric and acoustic guitars, lead vocals on track 4, backing vocals, producer
- Masanori Sasaji - keyboards and synthesizers, producer
- Minoru Niihara - lead vocals on tracks 2 and 8, backing vocals
- Masayoshi Yamashita - bass on tracks 1, 3, 4, 6, 7, 8, backing vocals
- Munetaka Higuchi - drums on tracks 1, 3, 6, 7, 8, 9
- Takayuki Hijikata - bass on track 2
- Reuben Tsujino - drums on track 2
- Kazuhisa Takahashi - drums on track 4
- Poker Face - strings on track 5
- Toshihiro Nakanishi - electric violin on track 5
- Milky Way - backing vocals

=== Production ===
- Daiko Nagato - producer
- Seigen Ono - engineer, mixing
