= Jun Hashizume =

Japanese actor (born 1960)

- 橋爪 淳
- Born: October 13, 1960 (age 64); Tokyo, Japan
- Education: Nihan University High School; Nihon University College of Art
- Occupation: Actor
- Years active: 1982–present
- Agent: Toho Entertainment
- Known for: Tokugawa Yoshinobu
- Website: www.toho-ent.co.jp/actor/1222 (in Japanese)

Jun Hashizume (橋爪 淳, Hashizume Jun, born 13 October 1960) is a Japanese actor who has appeared in a number of feature films and television series. He graduated from Nihon University High School and Nihon University College of Art. He is represented with Toho Entertainment.

== Filmography ==
=== TV series ===
Year	Title	Role	Notes	Ref.
1992	Nobunaga: King of Zipangu	Maeda Toshiie	Taiga drama	
1998	Tokugawa Yoshinobu	Hijikata Toshizō	Taiga drama	
2020	Ultraman Z	Kojiro Inab		
2024	Dear Radiance	Fujiwara no Yoritada	Taiga drama	
2025	Clevatess	King of Haiden (voice)		

=== Films ===
Year	Title	Role	Notes	Ref.
1994	Godzilla vs. SpaceGodzilla	Koji Shinjo		
2004	Godzilla: Final Wars	Secretary-General of the United Nations		
2021	Will I Be Single Forever?			
2023	Hoshi 35	Mizuno		

=== Stage ===
Year	Title	Role	Ref.
1983	Hibari Misora Butai 20-shūnenkinen Musical: Suisen no Uta		
