= Power Up Turtles =

Single by Hironobu Kageyama

from the album Mutant Turtles: Superman Legend Original Sound Track
- Released: March 20, 1996
- Genre: Anime
- Length: 3:49
- Label: Columbia Jp
- Songwriter: Yukinojo Mori

Hironobu Kageyama singles chronology
"Dokkan Beat" (1995)	"Power Up Turtles" (1996)	"Get up! V Magnum" (1996)

"Power Up Turtles" (パワーアップ・タートルズ, Pawā Appu Tātoruzu) is a song by Japanese singer Hironobu Kageyama and was used as the opening theme for the original video animation Mutant Turtles: Superman Legend, based on the 1987 Ninja Turtles series. It was written by Yukinojo Mori and composed by Takeshi Ike. It was released by Columbia Records on March 3, 1996 in Japan only and is coupled with the series closing theme "Chikyū wa Ogenki" performed by Mokkun. The song would also go on to be featured in Kageyama's five disc anthology box set Eternity.

== Track list ==
1. "Power Up Turtles" (パワーアップ・タートルズ, Pawā Appu Tātoruzu)
2. "The Earth is Safe" (地球はお元気, Chikyū wa Ogenki)
3. "Power Up Turtles (Original Karaoke)" (パワーアップ・タートルズ（オリジナル・カラオケ）, Pawā Appu Tātoruzu (Orijinaru Karaoke))
4. "The Earth is Safe (Original Karaoke)" (地球はお元気（オリジナル・カラオケ）, Chikyū wa Ogenki (Orijinaru Karaoke))
