= Ultraman Z =

Japanese TV series

- Title card
- Genre: Tokusatsu; Kyodai Hero; Kaiju; Science fiction
- Created by: Tsuburaya Productions
- Screenplay by: Satoshi Suzuki; Takao Nakano; Sotaro Hayashi; Yūji Kobayashi; Toshizo Nemoto; Jun Tsugita; Ryo Ikeda
- Story by: Kōta Fukihara; Kiyotaka Taguchi
- Directed by: Kiyotaka Taguchi (Note: Series director. Episodes directors are Takanori Tsujimoto, Koichi Sakamoto, Kazuhiro Nakagawa, Katsuro Onoue, Masayoshi Takesue, Tomonobu Koshi, and Naoyuki Uchida.)
- Starring: Kohshu Hirano; Rima Matsuda; Hikari Kuroki; Takaya Aoyagi; Jun Hashizume; Rihito Noda; Hisahiro Ogura
- Voices of: Tasuku Hatanaka; Yūki Ono; Katsumi Fukuhara
- Opening theme: "Goshōwa Kudasai Ware no Na o!"; by Masaaki Endoh
- Ending theme: "Connect the Truth"; by Nami Tamaki; "Promise for the future"; by Tasuku Hatanaka
- Composer: Hijiri Anze
- Country of origin: Japan
- Original language: Japanese
- No. of episodes: 25

Production
- Executive producer: Masahiro Onda
- Producers: Akira Kishine; Junko Oishi; Hayato Saga
- Cinematography: Satoshi Murakawa
- Editors: Yosuke Yafune; Mitsunori Nishida
- Running time: 25 minutes
- Production companies: Tsuburaya Productions; TV Tokyo; Dentsu

Original release
- Network: TXN (TV Tokyo)
- Release: June 20 – December 19, 2020

Related
- Ultraman Taiga; Ultraman Trigger

Ultraman Z (ウルトラマン Z, Urutoraman Zetto) is a Japanese tokusatsu drama produced by Tsuburaya Productions. It is the 25th entry (35th overall) in the Ultra Series, the ninth entry to the "New Generation Heroes" lineup and the second series released in the Reiwa era, celebrating the 10th anniversary of Ultraman Zero. It premiered in TV Tokyo on June 20, 2020. On April 2, 2023, an English dub was announced, with the premiere date of April 8 on the official Ultraman Youtube Channel, with new episodes uploaded every Saturday and Sundays at 11 pm JST.

== Synopsis ==
Remnants of Ultraman Belial, known as the Devil Splinters, were scattered across the universe and turned infected monsters into berserkers. To combat the resulting chaos, the Land of Light created the Ultra Medals and Z Risers, but several of these devices were stolen by Celebro, forcing Ultraman Zero and his self-proclaimed disciple Z to chase it to the Earth. Z carried out his incapacitated master's mission and the Z Riser to recover the stolen Ultra Medals on Earth, where he bonded with STORAGE (ストレイジ, Sutoreiji) officer Haruki Natsukawa to combat the space monster Genegarg. Ever since then, Haruki assisted Z in reclaiming lost Ultra Medals and at the same time defending mankind from monsters and extraterrestrial threats. Haruki's mission as a STORAGE member is accompanied by his senior/ace pilot Yoko Nakashima, the young scientist Yuka Ohta, the elderly repairman Kojiro Inaba and his captain Shota Hebikura, whose true identity is Jugglus Juggler from Ultraman Orb.

Meanwhile, the space parasite Celebro took possession of a youth named Shinya Kaburagi to create chaos and experiment with the Ultra's technology to harbor the power of monsters. In addition to Ultraman Z, Haruki is also assisted by guests appearing as Ultras; Riku/Ultraman Geed, Zero, and his godfather Ace. STORAGE begins to create stronger machines and armaments, but as the series progressed, Celebro took over the GAFJ director Kuriyama to further the advancements of new weaponries and disbanded STORAGE. His true plan is to provoke mankind into creating their strongest weapon and turn it against them. He eventually possessed Yoko to hijack Ultroid Zero and transform it into the cyborg monster known as Destrudos to initiate his Civilization Self-Destruction Game on Earth. Juggler reforms STORAGE to rescue Yoko as Haruki succeeded through sheer will, forcing Celebro to abandon her and possessed Destrudos as a last resort. After being knocked out of his strongest form, Ultraman Z unleashed his full power to destroy Destrudos and finally save Earth. Celebro was captured by STORAGE and a vengeful Kaburagi to be dissected as Juggler resigned from the team to leave Earth. Haruki retains his bond with Z, but instead of staying in STORAGE, he decided to leave for outer space to continue Z's mission as an Ultraman, though he assured the rest of STORAGE that he would return to Earth on regular occasions.

== Production ==
The entire project was conceived by Tsuburaya Productions with a different draft and story composition. Chief producer Tsugumi Kitaura offered Taguchi the role of the main director in August 2019 and the latter requested the inclusion of Kota Fukihara, as well as the pair to rewrite the original draft to their own preference. Production of the series started two months earlier than most of the New Generation Heroes series so as to anticipate the 2020 Summer Olympics prior to its initial postponement from the COVID-19 pandemic in Japan. He also invited a screenwriter named Keigo Koyanagi and military supervisor Yasuhiro Koshi to provide an in-depth accuracy to the themes of military. Because Taguchi had participated in most of the New Generation Heroes instalments since Ultraman Ginga S, he decided to turn Ultraman Z as his own version of the line's conclusion. (Note: Director Masayoshi Takesue confirms that the brand still continues at the time of Ultraman Decker's premier, the latter being the 10th instalment as a whole.) Jugglus Juggler's inclusion into the series was to expand his character after his last appearance in Ultraman Orb.

In previous entries of the Ultra Series, the defense team concept was dropped out so as to save the production cost, but Taguchi proposed the inclusion of giant robots as alternatives to combat vehicles. The first to be created was King Joe STORAGE Custom, but Sevenger was introduced earlier in the series to garner attention from fans for its cuter appeal. The late inclusion of King Joe was to emphasize STORAGE's growth as an attack team and to prevent it from overshadowing Ultraman Z in the early episodes.

The show's name was first trademarked and registered by Tsuburaya Productions on December 27, 2019, and published on January 21, 2020. Ultraman Z was immediately announced by official website of Tsuburaya Productions on March 26, 2020. As the first trailer of the series was released on April 16, 2020, the official website of Tsuburaya Productions quickly announced Kiyotaka Taguchi as its main director, Tatsuomi Hamada's return as the show's supporting cast and finally Masaaki Endoh and Nami Tamaki singing the opening and ending themes respectively. The entire cast members of STORAGE and GAFJ members made their live broadcast on June 5, 2020. Automobile manufacturing company Toyota announced their cooperation in the series production by providing Toyota LQ as STORAGE's main transport.

After his passing on May 17, Kōta Fukihara's role as the story editor was subsequently taken over by Taguchi, with Tsuburaya Productions and the production staffs of Ultraman Z publishing their tribute in the official sites. According to Kohshu Hirano, filming of Ultraman Z was among those affected by the COVID-19 pandemic in Japan and went postponed for two months before it was resumed. This happened at some point before the series premiere on June 20.

== Episodes ==
No.	Title	Written by	Original release date	English release date
1	"Chant My Name!"; Transliteration: "Goshōwa Kudasai Ware no Na o!" (Japanese: ご唱和ください 我の名を!)	Kōta Fukihara	June 20, 2020	April 8, 2023
2	"A Warrior's Principles"; Transliteration: "Senshi no Kokoroe" (Japanese: 戦士の心得)	Kōta Fukihara	June 27, 2020	April 9, 2023
3	"Live Coverage! The Monster Transport Operation"; Transliteration: "Nama Chūkei! Kaijū Yusō Dai Sakusen" (Japanese: 生中継!怪獣輸送大作戦)	Kōta Fukihara	July 4, 2020	April 15, 2023
4	"The Second Robot Activation Plan"; Transliteration: "Nigō Robo Kidō Keikaku" (Japanese: 二号ロボ起動計画)	Satoshi Suzuki	July 11, 2020	April 16, 2023
5	"First Juggling"; Transliteration: "Fāsuto Jaguringu" (Japanese: ファースト・ジャグリング)	Takao Nakano	July 18, 2020	April 22, 2023
6	"The Man Returns!"; Transliteration: "Kaettekita Otoko!" (Japanese: 帰ってきた男!)	Sotaro Hayashi	July 25, 2020	April 23, 2023
7	"His Majesty's Medal"; Transliteration: "Heika no Medaru" (Japanese: 陛下のメダル)	Sotaro Hayashi	August 1, 2020	April 29, 2023
8	"The Mystic Power"; Transliteration: "Shinpi no Chikara" (Japanese: 神秘の力)	Yūji Kobayashi	August 8, 2020	April 30, 2023
9	"The Unidentified Object Convoy Order"; Transliteration: "Mikakunin Busshitsu Gosō Shirei" (Japanese: 未確認物質護送指令)	Satoshi Suzuki	August 15, 2020	May 6, 2023
10	"Here Comes the Space Pirate!"; Transliteration: "Uchū Kaizoku Tōjō!" (Japanese: 宇宙海賊登場!)	Takao Nakano	August 22, 2020	May 7, 2023
SP	"Special Airborne Armor Secret File"; Transliteration: "Tokkūki Shīkuretto Fairu" (Japanese: 特空機シークレットファイル)	Ryo Ikeda	August 29, 2020	N/A
11	"What Must Be Defended"; Transliteration: "Mamoru beki Mono" (Japanese: 守るべきもの)	Kōta Fukihara	September 5, 2020	May 13, 2023
12	"The Cry of Life"; Transliteration: "Sakebu Inochi" (Japanese: 叫ぶ命)	Toshizo Nemoto	September 12, 2020	May 14, 2023
13	"I'll Feast on Medals!"; Transliteration: "Medaru Itadakimasu!" (Japanese: メダルいただきます!)	Ryo Ikeda	September 19, 2020	May 20, 2023
14	"Four-Dimensional Capriccio"; Transliteration: "Yojigen Kyōsōkyoku" (Japanese: 四次元狂騒曲)	Kōta Fukihara	September 26, 2020	May 21, 2023
15	"A Warrior's Duty"; Transliteration: "Senshi no Shimei" (Japanese: 戦士の使命)	Kōta Fukihara	October 3, 2020	May 27, 2023
16	"The Lion's Cry"; Transliteration: "Shishi no Koe" (Japanese: 獅子の声)	Yūji Kobayashi	October 10, 2020	May 28, 2023
17	"Beliarok"; Transliteration: "Beriaroku" (Japanese: ベリアロク)	Takao Nakano	October 17, 2020	June 3, 2023
18	"Rechallenge from the Year 2020"; Transliteration: "Nisen-nijū-nen no Sai Chōsen" (Japanese: 2020年の再挑戦)	Jun Tsugita	October 24, 2020	June 4, 2023
19	"The Last Hero"; Transliteration: "Saigo no Yūsha" (Japanese: 最後の勇者)	Toshizo Nemoto	October 31, 2020	June 10, 2023
SP	"Bonds of Masters and Disciples"; Transliteration: "Tsunagu Shitei" (Japanese: つなぐ師弟)	Ryo Ikeda	November 7, 2020	N/A
20	"To Care and What Lies Beyond"; Transliteration: "Omoi, Sono Saki ni" (Japanese: 想い、その先に)	Yūji Kobayashi	November 14, 2020	June 11, 2023
21	"D4"	Satoshi Suzuki	November 21, 2020	June 17, 2023
22	"Individual Tomorrows"; Transliteration: "Sorezore no Asu" (Japanese: それぞれの明日)	Sotaro Hayashi	November 28, 2020	June 18, 2023
23	"Prelude to a Nightmare"; Transliteration: "Akumu e no Pureryūdo" (Japanese: 悪夢へのプレリュード)	Kōta Fukihara	December 5, 2020	June 24, 2023
24	"The Game to Extinction"; Transliteration: "Metsubō e no Yūgi" (Japanese: 滅亡への遊戯)	Kōta Fukihara	December 12, 2020	June 25, 2023
25	"Warriors Shining Beyond"; Transliteration: "Haruka ni Kagayaku Senshi-tachi" (Japanese: 遥かに輝く戦士たち)	Kōta Fukihara	December 19, 2020	July 1, 2023
SP	"Re:STORAGE"; Transliteration: "Ri Sutoreiji" (Japanese: リ:ストレイジ)	N/A	December 26, 2020	N/A

== Ultraman Z & Ultraman Zero Voice Drama ==
Ultraman Z & Ultraman Zero Voice Drama (ウルトラマンゼット&ウルトラマンゼロ ボイスドラマ, Urutoraman Zetto Ando Urutoraman Zero Boisu Dorama) is a series of 24-episode audio dramas streamed on Tsuburaya Productions' YouTube channel. The series focuses on Ultraman Z's encounter with Ultraman Zero back in the Land of Light.

1. The Story of the Encounter Between Z and Zero (ゼットとゼロの出会いの話, Zetto to Zero no Deai no Hanashi)
2. If You Face a Transparent Monster (透明怪獣に出会ったら, Tōmei Kaijū ni Deatta ra)
3. Master's Friend (師匠の友達, Shishō no Tomodachi)
4. The Trusty Capsule Monsters (頼もしいカプセル怪獣, Tanomoshii Kapuseru Kaijū)
5. Ultraman and Ancient History (ウルトラマンと太古の歴史, Urutoraman to Taiko no Rekishi)
6. Ultra Z Riser (ウルトラゼットライザー, Urutora Zetto Raizā)
7. Turn Back Time (時間よ戻れ, Jikan yo Modore)
8. Other Space-Time Ultramen (別の時空のウルトラマン, Betsu no Jikū no Ultraman)
9. The Younger Brother of Steel (鋼鉄の弟さん, Kōtetsu no Otōto-san)
10. Alien Barossa (バロッサ星人, Barossa Seijin)
11. About Master Zero's Father (ゼロ師匠のお父さんのこと, Zero-shishō no Otōsan no Koto)
12. Robots Are Reliable! (頼もしいぜ、ロボット!, Tanomoshii ze, Robotto!)
13. Ultra Medals (ウルトラメダル, Urutora Medaru)
14. Spark Dolls Theater Z (スパークドールズ劇場Z, Supāku Dōruzu Gekijō Zetto)
15. Strongest Form! (最強の姿!, Saikyō no Sugata!)
16. The Story of Not Knowing What Is Useful (何が役に立つかはわからないという話, Nani ga Yaku ni Tatsu ka wa Wakaranai to Iu Hanashi)
17. Black Ultramen (黒いウルトラマン, Kuroi Urutoraman)
18. Train Your Head! (頭を鍛えろ!, Atama o Kitaero!)
19. Brothers (兄さん, Niisan)
20. Galaxy Rescue Force (ギャラクシーレスキューフォース, Gyarakushī Resukyū Fōsu)
21. Brother Mebius (メビウス兄さん, Mebiusu Niisan)
22. Recruitment Examinations: Part 1 (採用試験①, Saiyō Shiken Ichi)
23. Recruitment Examinations: Part 2 (採用試験②, Saiyō Shiken Ni)
24. Starting from Here (ここから始まる, Koko kara Hajimaru)

== Other media ==
=== Ultra Galaxy Fight: The Absolute Conspiracy ===
Ultra Galaxy Fight: The Absolute Conspiracy (ウルトラギャラクシーファイト 大いなる陰謀, Urutora Gyarakushī Faito Ōinaru Inbō) is the second of the Ultra Galaxy Fight miniseries to be made and set to air on YouTube on November 22, 2020. In addition to being a prequel series, the title character of Ultraman Z made his appearance as one of the characters involved.

=== Fight! Sevenger ===
Fight! Sevenger (戦え！セブンガー, Tatakae! Sebungā) is a manga spin-off that was serialized in the Televi-Kun magazine from the April 2021 issue to the April 2022 issue. It is written by Kiyotaka Taguchi and illustrated by Tetsuya Kawaishi, the latter having served as a storyboard artist in episodes 12 and 14 of Ultraman Z. It serves as a prequel to the television series, taking place prior to the arrival of Ultraman Z on Earth. The events of the special episode take place during Sevenger's decommit in the television series.

1. N/A
2. Suruga Bay Close Call! The Deeplus Defeat Operation! (駿河湾危機一髪！ディプラス掃討作戦！, Suruga-wan Kikiippatsu! Dipurasu Sōtō Sakusen!)
3. The Rough Mountain God! Jirangon's Fury! (荒ぶる山神！ジランゴンの猛威！, Araburu Yamagami! Jirangon no Mōi!)
4. Nightmare Overseas Dispatch! Giant Insect Majaba! (悪夢の海外派遣！巨大昆虫マジャバ！, Akumu no Kaigai Haken! Kyodai Konchū Majaba!)
5. The Dreadful Red Cloud! Red Smogy's Fury (恐怖の赤い雲！レッドスモーギの猛威, Kyōfu no Akai Kumo! Reddo Sumōgi no Mōi)
6. The Fast Monster! Stop Idatenran! (俊足の大怪獣！イダテンランを止めろ！, Shunsoku no Dai Kaijū Idatenran o Tomero!)
7. The Astonishing Exploding Flame Monster! Vortech Fire's Rampage! (驚異の爆烈炎怪獣！ボルテックファイヤー大暴れ！, Kyōi no Bakuretsu Honō Kaijū! Borutekku Faiyā Ō Abare!)
8. Show It! STORAGE's Underlying Strength! Defeat Vortech Fire (見せろ！ストレイジの底力！ボルテックファイヤーを倒せ, Misero! Sutoreiji no Sokojikara! Borutekku Faiyā o Taose)
9. Crash! The Thick-Skulled Rock Monster Gakuma! (大激突！石頭の岩石怪獣ガクマ！, Dai Gekitotsu! Ishiatama no Ganseki Kaijū Gakuma!)
10. The Two-Sided Demon! Ashuran's Attack! (二面の悪魔！アシュラン大襲撃！, Nimen no Akuma! Ashuran Dai Shūgeki!)
11. Raging Counterattack! Double Sevengers vs. Ashuran! (怒涛の大反撃！W(ダブル)セブンガー対アシュラン！, Dotō no Dai Hangeki! Daburu Sebungā Tai Ashuran!)

SP1. Defeat Samekujira! The Secret Story of the Completion of the Drill Attack (サメクジラを倒せ！ドリルアタック完成秘話, Samekujira o Taose! Doriru Atakku Kansei Hiwa)
SP2. Namegon Attack! The First Deployment of the Unbroken Iron Body Sevenger! (ナメゴン襲来！沈まぬ鉄塊・セブンガー初出動！, Namegon Shūrai! Shizumanu Tekkai Sebungā Hatsu Shutsudō!)

=== Sevenger Fight ===
Sevenger Fight (セブンガーファイト, Sebungā Faito) is a 10-episode miniseries based on the low-budget miniseries Ultra Fight, released as a pay-per-view content. The first to seventh episodes are available in Tsuburaya Imagination website while the remaining three episodes would be available in the Ultraman Z Perfect Super Complete Works STORAGE Box (ウルトラマンZ完全超全集ストレイジBOX, Urutoraman Zetto Kanzen Chōzenshū Sutoreiji Bokkusu) in July 2021. All mini episodes are directed and written by Kiyotaka Taguchi and Junichiro Ashiki respectively, while Kohshu Hirano, Rima Matsuda, Hikari Kuroki and Takaya Aoyagi provided the background voices.

=== Life's Decision Height: The Story of STORAGE's Foundation ===
Life's Decision Height: The Story of STORAGE's Foundation (擲命のデシジョン・ハイト ―ストレイジ創設物語―, Tekimei no Deshijon Haito Sutoreiji Sōsetsu Monogatari) is a two-part novel spin-off released on Tsuburaya Imagination. It is written and supervised by Keigo Koyanagi and Kiyotaka Taguchi respectively, and serves as a prequel to the television series from GAFJ's perspective.

=== Ja no Michi wa Hebi ===
Ja no Michi wa Hebi (ジャの道は蛇) is a short novel spin-off included in the Ultraman Z Perfect Super Complete Works book. It is written by Takao Nakano and supervised by Kiyotaka Taguchi and Tsuburaya Productions, and serves as a prequel to the television series from Jugglus Juggler's perspective.

=== Ultraman Trigger: Episode Z ===
Ultraman Trigger: Episode Z (ウルトラマントリガー エピソードZ, Urutoraman Torigā Episōdo Zetto) is a film released on Tsuburaya Imagination and in Japanese theaters on March 18, 2022.

== Cast ==
- Haruki Natsukawa (ナツカワ ハルキ, Natsukawa Haruki): Kohshu Hirano (平野 宏周, Hirano Kōshū)
- Yoko Nakashima (ナカシマ ヨウコ, Nakashima Yōko): Rima Matsuda (松田 リマ, Matsuda Rima)
- Yuka Ohta (オオタ ユカ, Ōta Yuka): Hikari Kuroki (黒木 ひかり, Kuroki Hikari)
- Shota Hebikura (ヘビクラ ショウタ, Hebikura Shōta)/Jugglus Juggler (ジャグラスジャグラー, Jagurasu Jagurā): Takaya Aoyagi (青柳 尊哉, Aoyagi Takaya)
- Kojiro Inaba (イナバ コジロー, Inaba Kojirō): Jun Hashizume (橋爪 淳, Hashizume Jun)
- Shinya Kaburagi (カブラギ シンヤ, Kaburagi Shin'ya): Rihito Noda (野田 理人, Noda Rihito)
- Satoshi (サトシ): Reo Sato (佐藤 玲央, Satō Reo)
- Seiji (セイジ): Fuma Kakuda (角田 楓馬, Kakuda Fūma)
- Hiroshi (ヒロシ): Daichi Takaoka (高岡 大地, Takaoka Daichi)
- Mai Yuki (ユウキ マイ, Yūki Mai): Maya Hayashi (林 摩耶, Hayashi Maya)
- Director Kuriyama (クリヤマ長官, Kuriyama-chōkan): Hisahiro Ogura (小倉 久寛, Ogura Hisahiro)

=== Voice cast ===
- Ultraman Z: Tasuku Hatanaka (畠中 祐, Hanata Tasuku)
- STORAGE AI: Katsumi Fukuhara (福原 かつみ, Fukuhara Katsumi)
- Beliarok (ベリアロク, Beriaroku): Yūki Ono (小野 友樹, Ono Yūki)
- Ultra Z Riser (ウルトラゼットライザー, Urutora Zetto Raizā): Patrick Yu (パトリック・ユウ, Patorikku Yū)

=== Guest cast ===
- Ultraman Zero (ウルトラマンゼロ, Urutoraman Zero; Voice; 1, 6–7): Mamoru Miyano (宮野 真守, Miyano Mamoru)
- Riku Asakura (朝倉 リク, Asakura Riku; 6–7, 15)/Ultraman Geed (ウルトラマンジード, Urutoraman Jīdo; Voice; 6–7, 15): Tatsuomi Hamada (濱田 龍臣, Hamada Tatsuomi)
- Alien Pegassa "Pega" (ペガッサ星人 ペガ, Pegassa Seijin Pega; Voice; 6–7): Megumi Han (潘 めぐみ, Han Megumi)
- Alien Pitt "Fa" (ピット星人 ファ, Pitto Seijin Fa; 8): Kanon Miyahara (宮原 華音, Miyahara Kanon)
- Ultraman Ace (ウルトラマンエース, Urutoraman Ēsu; Voice; 19): Keiji Takamine (高峰 圭二, Takamine Keiji)

=== English dubbing cast ===
Voice cast:

- Haruki Natsukawa: Zeno Robinson
- Ultraman Z: Matt Shipman
- Yoko Nakashima: Mallorie Rodak
- Yuka Ohta: Macy Ann Johnson
- Shota Hebikura/Jugglus Juggler: Mick Lauer
- Saburo Kuriyama: Ben Phillips
- Shinya Kaburagi: Howard Wang
- Beliarok: Patrick Seitz
- Ultraman Zero: Sean Schemmel
- Riku Asakura/Ultraman Geed: Kevin K. Gomez
- Pega: Brina Palencia

== Theme songs ==
Opening theme

- "Goshōwa Kudasai Ware no Na o!" (ご唱和ください 我の名を！; "I Ask That You Chant My Name!")
  - Arrangement: Kyoichi Miyazaki (宮崎 京一, Miyazaki Kyōichi) (KEYTONE), Ryota Iida (飯田 涼太, Iida Ryōta) (KEYTONE)
  - Lyrics, Composition, & Artist: Masaaki Endoh (遠藤 正明, Endō Masaaki)
  - Episodes: 1-13 (Verse 1); 14–24, SP3 (Verse 2)
  In episode 25, this song is used as an insert song.

Ending themes

- "Connect the Truth"
  - Lyrics, Composition, & Arrangement: Takumi Ozawa (尾澤 拓実, Ozawa Takumi)
  - Artist: Nami Tamaki (玉置 成実, Tamaki Nami)
  - Episodes: 1-13
  In episode 15, this song is used as an insert song.
- "Promise for the future"
  - Lyrics: Mike Sugiyama (マイク スギヤマ, Maiku Sugiyama)
  - Composition: Toru Watanabe (渡辺 徹, Watanabe Tōru)
  - Arrangement: ats-, Takehito Shimizu (清水 武仁, Shimizu Takehito) & Toru Watanabe (Blue Bird's Nest)
  - Artist: Tasuku Hatanaka
  - Episodes: 14–24
  In episode 25, this song is used as an insert song.

== International broadcast ==
In Hong Kong, this series aired on ViuTV on May 15, 2021. In Philippines, this series aired on GMA on July 24, 2022. In Vietnam, this series aired on FPT Play on June 1, 2024

== Reception ==
Ultraman Z was ranked sixth place on 2020's "100 Internet Buzzwords" in Japan, held by Nico Nico Pedia and Pixiv Encyclopedia. The physical award was given to director Kiyotaka Taguchi during the award ceremony on December 15, 2020. Shota Hebikura, the alias of Jugglus Juggler in the series was also one of many entries in said award, having ranked 45th place. Taguchi admitted that Ultraman Z being an action-packed series was to originally anticipate the Olympics. On July 21, 2021, Ultraman Z was labelled as the winner of the Best Dramatic Presentation category from the Seiun Award, making the series as the second entry in Ultra Series to obtain the award after Ultraman Tiga in 1998.

In addition to television airing, episodes of Ultraman Z were rebroadcast on YouTube for worldwide audience to watch, at Taguchi's suggestion, which also included English subtitles. According to Taguchi's interview in August 2020, the first episode met with good reception from various audience in the worldwide, especially the United States.

Anime mecha designer and former Bandai employee Tsuyoshi Nonaka wrote his commentary in the fortieth Ultra Tokusatsu Perfect Mook, pertaining to Ultraman Z, he applauded Taguchi for the use of robots for defense team, an idea that the former actually brought to Bandai in the 1990s, but was rejected out of fear that the Ultraman would be overshadowed. Nonaka compares Beliarok, the sentient sword that is used by the eponymous Ultraman Z, to the Byakkoshinken from Gosei Sentai Dairanger, but he felt that the sword's introduction into the show is abrupt and sees the interaction of an Ultraman Belial-based character with Ultraman Z and Haruki is unfit. This is because due to Ultraman Belial's interaction with other Ultras would have been Zero and Geed, therefore suggesting that Juggler would be a better candidate due to his frequent run-in with the main characters of the series, as well as sharing a neutrality stance in any conflict being similar to Beliarok as well.

== See also ==
- Ultra Series - Complete list of official Ultraman-related shows.
