= Kyorochan =

Mascot character

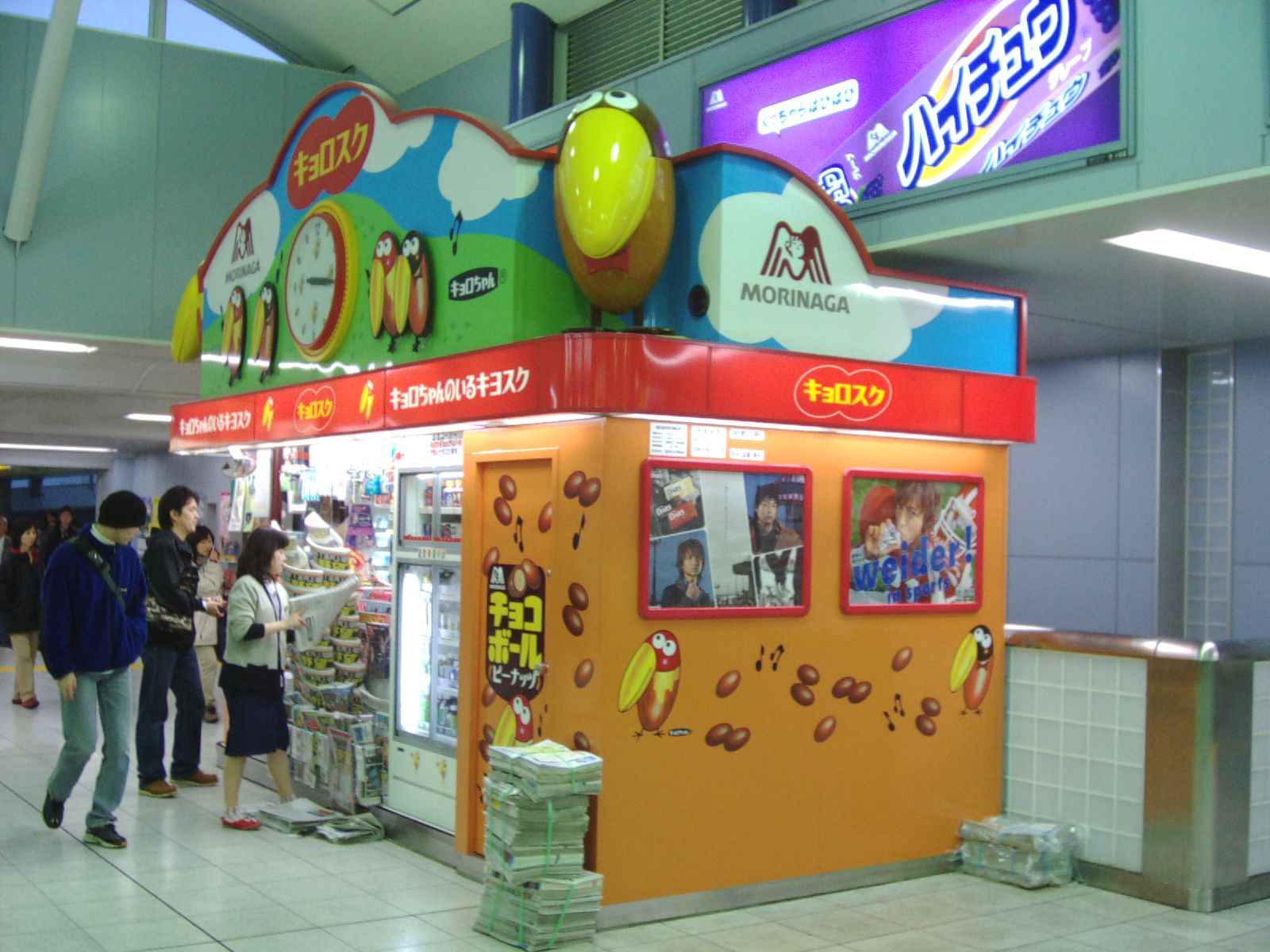
Kyorochan as seen on the Kyorosk.

Kyorochan (キョロちゃん) is a fictional bird that serves as a mascot for the Japanese chocolate ChocoBall, manufactured by Morinaga & Company. He first appeared in 1967, replacing the character Chappy, a space-themed squirrel from Space Boy Soran, who was the original mascot for the brand, first appearing in 1965.

Kyorochan's popularity began to take off in 1987, when TV commercials starring Kyorochan, as well as commercial songs performed by famous artists were made. In 1991, the name "Kyorochan" was printed on the boxes of ChocoBall candies. That same year, the sales of merchandise, such as stuffed animals and related products exceeded the sales of the ChocoBall brand itself.

== Cartoon ==
An animated show starring Kyorochan, with the same name, was produced by TV Tokyo, NAS, and SPE Visual Works and animated by Group TAC. These focus on the adventures of Kyorochan, as he lives on Angel Island, a large village home to various other birds. The first theme song is "Halation Summer", performed by Coconuts Musume, while the first ending theme was "Tsuukagu Ro", performed by Whiteberry. These were replaced by original songs by episode 27.

The series was released in very limited amounts in the D.V.D. format, with box-sets being rare. International releases of the cartoon include Hungary (Kukucska Kalandjai), Romania (with the name intact), Taiwan (大嘴鳥), the Czech Republic (Červánek), and South Korea (왕부리 팅코). The Indian television channel Pogo began broadcasting Kyorochan from May 31, 2010, a decade after the original show.

An obscure English dub appeared to have been made of the series, with Richie Campos only being the notable voice actor. Campos's name was curiously mentioned on its page in Anime News Network's encyclopedia, voicing Don Girori, Makumou, Dementon, Girosshu and the narrator. Other info and footage about this lost dub currently remain unknown.

=== Characters ===
- Kyoro-chan (voiced by Miyako Ito) - the titular character and a cute parrot who lives on Angel Island and has adventures with his friends. He was hatched from an egg in a temple found by the scientist Dr. Matsugale. He has an orange beak, red head, and brown and yellow pattern on his body. His name comes from the Japanese onomatopoeia "kyorokyoro", meaning "to look around"/"restlessly" – the second opening theme may reference the former.
- Dr. Matsugale (voiced by Rokuro Naya) - a scientist and Kyoro-chan's "adoptive father" who found him in the temple and traveled through the world with him, until they got separated during a storm. He can be seen at the end of many episodes reading letters Kyoro-chan sent him.
- Pachikuri (voiced by Takako Honda) - Kyoro-chan's first friend after returning to Angel Island, who introduced himself as "Mega Ultra Super Hot Pachikuri", but it was shortened to just Pachikuri because Kyoro-chan always got it wrong. Pachikuri is a dark blue and white penguin who is usually seen wearing a green cape and matching flippers on his feet. He is quite good at martial arts and never backs down from a challenge. His name means "blinking with surprise".
- Mikken (voiced by Kurumi Mamiya) - a yellow chicken and another of Kyoro-chan's friends. He always has a rather angry-looking expression no matter his mood (though occasionally this changes if he is extremely sad or happy), and his beak is always on one side of his face or the other, causing an odd aspect. He wears a broken eggshell as trousers. His name comes from the word "miken", meaning "area between one's eyebrows", in a reference to his large forehead and eyebrows that slump and make him look gruffer.
- Kurin (voiced by Takako Uemura) - another of Kyoro-chan's friends, Kurin is a cute pink duck who runs Angel Island's bakery shop with her big sister. Her name comes from "kuri", or chestnut, referring to the shape of her head.
- Masukara (voiced by Hinako Kanamaru) - a cute yellow duck and Kurin's big sister. She is Kurin's caretaker and they run the bakery shop together. Her name is romaji for "mascara".
- Girori - a blackbird who is often mean to Kyoro-chan and his friends. His parents are the richest birds on Angel Island, so he is rather stuck-up. He has a crush on Masukara.
- Konto and Takuto - a short green bird (likely either a hummingbird or kiwi bird) and pink duck who are Girori's henchmen. They are not very smart. Takuto wears a mask.
- Don Girori (voiced by Hideyuki Umezu) - Girori's dad and a millionaire who presides over Angel Island's economy. He is also the president of the toy company where Mikken's dad works at.
- Memeritcho (voiced by Rin Mizuhara) - Girori's mother and Don Girori's wife who loves him very much.
- Meguro (voiced by Kiyomitsu Mizuuchi) - Pachikuri's uncle and a light blue penguin with a pink hat. He is the primary caretaker of Pachikuri.
- Manajiri (voiced by Kōzō Shioya) - Mikken's dad and a yellow chicken with a very square head. He works as a designer at a toy factory.
- Rinkuru - Mikken's grandma. Her name literally means "wrinkle".
- Makumo (voiced by Hiroshi Ōtake) - an elderly greyish-blue bird with a beard and a hat. He often hangs out with Mikken's grandma.
- Ms. Metori - an old lady bird who seems to like Kyoro-chan, and he sometimes goes shopping with her. She calls him "Kyorobo" (combination of "Kyoro" and "dorobo", or thief) for unknown reasons. She is also the town gossip.
- Inspector Guriguri (voiced by Junpei Morita) - a condor who is Angel Island's private investigator. He wears a gray trench coat and glasses with swirls on them. His name is a reference to this because "guriguri" means "googly eyes" or "rolling one's eyes".
- Phantom Thief Girosshu (voiced by Junpei Morita) - a mysterious thief and Inspector Guriguri's alter ego. Though he is a thief, he is still kind and saved Kyoro-chan from falling off his balcony one night. It is rather ironic that a detective would have a thief alter ego, but since he saves people and doesn't hurt them, he's sort of a heroic criminal, so to speak.
- Shibashiba - large hairy black monster bird who everyone on Angel Island is afraid of (though Kyoro-chan himself sometimes isn't). It can shapeshift and reproduce itself, and it can turn someone else into a Shibashiba (as once happened to Mikken). There seems to be some religious connection to the Shibashiba, as the townspeople once sacrificed Kyoro-chan to it (actually, he volunteered, but ended up making friends with the Shibashiba anyway).
  The only thing that it can say is "shibashiba", hence its name - if one were turned into a Shibashiba, it would also affect their speech pattern. Mikken's grandma seemed to be able to recognize Mikken even when he was turned into a Shibashiba. Somehow this recognition turned him back, so it's possible that if someone realizes one's true self, they will change back. The name Shibashiba has two meanings: "often"/"frequently"/"again and again" and blinking repeatedly. The series itself may intentionally allude to both of these meanings.
- Mayu - a cute female penguin who Kyoro-chan once played with. Pachikuri has a crush on her.
- Pafu (Puff) - a cloud/cat like creature who Kyoro-chan keeps as a pet in the second season. It is unknown where he came from. The only sound he can make is a whistle-like sound, which kind of sounds like "pafu", hence his name. His name also might come from the fact that he looks like a cloud, which are puffy in appearance.
- Dementon (voiced by Toru Ohkawa) - a toucan who was kind to Kyoro-chan early in the series. The "deme" part of his name means "protruding eyes".

== Legacy ==
=== "Kyorosk" ===
The "Kyorosk" is a kiosk constructed in the JR East train station at Tamachi, Tokyo, in 2003. The store features Morinaga products, focusing especially on Kyoro-chan. Since the Morinaga corporate headquarters are located near Tamachi-eki Station, this store was devised as a joint venture between the company and JR East.

=== Video games ===
There are a couple licensed Nintendo games, along with a PlayStation sequel, but they are not related to the animated show:

- KyoroChan Land, an adapted conversion of Nebulus (also known as Castelian, Subline and Tower Toppler) was released for the Family Computer and Game Boy (by The Sales Curve/HIRO).
- Pocket KyoroChan, a (Super) Game Boy game, with a sequel (by Tomy and Jupiter).
- KyoroChan's Purikura Daisakusen (Kyoro-chan's Photo Sticker Booth Adventure) - a sequel of the Game Boy game above for PlayStation (by Tomy).
