= Hideyuki Umezu =

Japanese voice actor (1955–2024)

- 梅津 秀行
- Born: July 24, 1955; Aichi Prefecture, Japan
- Died: May 17, 2024 (aged 68)
- Occupations: Actor; voice actor
- Years active: 1982–2024
- Agent: 81 Produce
- Height: 170 cm (5 ft 7 in)

Hideyuki Umezu (梅津 秀行, Umezu Hideyuki; July 24, 1955 – May 17, 2024) was a Japanese actor who specialized in voice acting.

== Biography ==
Graduated from Tokyo Medical and Dental University, he said that if he hadn't become an actor, he would have become a dentist.

The catalyst for starting acting was when a friend attending Waseda University expressed the desire to start acting and asked him to find a theatre club together. He found and joined the theatre group "Kiryu" at the same university. His friend later left the group.

Through connections, he began appearing in period dramas and pursued a career as an actor. As his roles in period dramas gradually became more significant, he received his first speaking role. However, after watching the senior actors' performances, he thought, "Something's different... What could it be?" He realized that he hadn't studied acting, so he enrolled in an actor training school and then joined the NHK Actors Seminar to study film acting. There, he was encouraged to enroll in the voice acting program due to his experience in period and contemporary dramas.

After gaining experience as a teaching assistant, he was told about voice acting opportunities and made his voice acting debut in 1982 as Dr. Hyblow in the television anime Cybot Robotchi.

Umezu went on to work with NPS Theatre, Arts Vision, and eventually joined 81 Produce. He died from interstitial pneumonia on May 17, 2024, at the age of 68.

== Filmography ==
=== Television animation ===
1980s

- Mobile Suit Gundam ZZ (1986) – Nelmarsen
- Bravoman (1988) – Bravoman

1990s

- Holly the Ghost (1991) – Kakarasu
- Otaku no Video (1991) – Yoshida
- Soar High! Isami (1995) – Eisuke Yukimi, Sensuke Yukimi, Yoroi Tengu
- Yu-Gi-Oh! (1998) – Chief Inspector (ep.2)
- Kyorochan (1999) – Don Girori

2000s

- Shrine of the Morning Mist (2002) – Naonori Hieda
- GetBackers (2003) – Azuma
- Zatch Bell! (2005) – Earth
- Blood+ – Aston Collins
- Death Note (2006) – Narrator, Armonia Jastin Beyondllemason
- Naruto (2006) – Amachi
- Fullmetal Alchemist: Brotherhood (2009) – Barry the Chopper
- Pandora Hearts (2009) – Oscar Vessalius
- Umineko no Naku Koro ni (2009) – Sadakichi Kumasawa

2010s

- Panty and Stocking with Garterbelt (2010) – Abrams Monkey Lawyer
- Hunter × Hunter (2012) – Battera
- Jormungand: Perfect Order (2012) – Nazal
- Naruto Shippuden (2012) – Gengetsu Hōzuki/Second Mizukage
- One Piece (2014) – Diamante
- Gangsta. (2015) – Uranos Corsica
- Re:Zero − Starting Life in Another World (2016) – Conwood Melahau
- Gabriel DropOut (2017) – Master (ep.3, 7, 11, 12)
- Mahojin Guru Guru (2017) – Lithograph (ep.6, 14)
- Zoids Wild (2018) – Taifu

Unknown date

- Bakugan Battle Brawlers – Naga
- Bonobono – Araiguma-kun's father
- Cromartie High School – Akira Nakao
- Domain of Murder – Tsuyoshi Toyama
- Mobile Suit Gundam 00 – Ian Vashti
- MÄR – Kannochi
- Saru Get You -On Air- – Hakase, Ukki Red
- Tenchi Muyo! – Yukinojyo
- Toriko – Alfaro

=== Original video animation ===
- La Blue Girl (1992) – Old Man, Gamara
- Mutant Turtles: Superman Legend (1996) – Splinter
- Mobile Suit Gundam Unicorn (2010) – Hill Dawson
- JoJo's Bizarre Adventure (xxxx) – Pilot A

=== Theatrical animation ===
- 6 Angels (2002) – Ed Canyon

=== Live action ===
- Kousoku Sentai Turboranger (1989–1990, Episodes: 1–51) – Rage Flying Boma Zulten / Zulten Metal Type
- Chikyuu Sentai Fiveman (1990, Episodes: 6, 24, 24) – Garoa-don / Enokiraagin / Batzler Soldier No. 339
- Choujin Sentai Jetman (1991, Episodes: 11, 13–14, 28) – Jihaiki Jigen / Camela Jigen / Dryer Jigen
- Chouriki Sentai Ohranger (1996, Episode: 42) – Bara Hunter (uncredited)
  - Chouriki Sentai Ohranger Movie (1995) – Steam Punkus
- Gekisou Sentai Carranger (1996, Episode: 7) – NN Nerenko
- Kyukyu Sentai GoGoFive (1999, Episode: 18) – Tactical Psyma Beast Spiderus
- Hyakujuu Sentai Gaoranger (2001, Episode: 25) – Karaoke Org
- Bakuryuu Sentai Abaranger (2004, Episode: 45) – Trinoid #22: Nanakusarunba
- Mahou Sentai Magiranger (2005–2006, Episode: 35–48) – Hades Ultimate God Sleipnir
- Juken Sentai Gekiranger (2007–2008, Episode: 36–48) – Mythical Beast Basilisk-Fist Sanyo
- Samurai Sentai Shinkenger (2009, Episode: 7) – Ayakashi Yamiororo

=== Games ===
- Rogue Galaxy (2005) – Steve
- Ehrgeiz (1998) – Lee Shuwen
- Super Robot Wars (????) – Vindel Mauser
- Mega Man 11 (2018) – Dr. Wily

=== Drama CDs ===
- Miscast Series (????) – Masahiro Motoki
- Chrno Crusade (????) – Edward Hamilton/Elder

=== Dubbing ===
==== Live-action ====
- Annie – NY1 Reporter (Pat Kiernan)
- Blood Father – Kirby Curtis (William H. Macy)
- The Dictator – "Nuclear" Nadal (Jason Mantzoukas)
- Dr. Dolittle: Tail to the Chief – Chief Dorian (Malcolm Stewart)
- ER – Paul Nathan (Don Cheadle)
- Escape from L.A. – Map to the Stars Eddie (Steve Buscemi)
- Fathers' Day – Jack Lawrence (Billy Crystal)
- Godzilla – Sergeant O'Neal (Doug Savant)
- Green Book – Charlie the Pawn Guy (Peter Gabb)
- Harry Potter series – Arthur Weasley (Mark Williams)
- Hotel Rwanda – Paul Rusesabagina (Don Cheadle)
- Infestation – Ethan (Ray Wise)
- The Island – James McCord (Steve Buscemi)
- Minari – Paul (Will Patton)
- Mission: Impossible – Ghost Protocol – Marek Stefanski (Pavel Kříž)
- Resident Evil: Afterlife – Bennett Sinclair (Kim Coates)
- Shameless – Frank Gallagher (William H. Macy)
- A Star Is Born – Wolfie (Michael Harney)
- Tomb Raider – Terry (Duncan Airlie James)
- Transformers: Age of Extinction – Joshua Joyce (Stanley Tucci)
- Transformers: The Last Knight – Merlin (Stanley Tucci)
- Apollo 13 (2003 Fuji TV edition) – Henry Hurt (Xander Berkeley)
- Dead Ahead: The Exxon Valdez Disaster – Sam Skinner (Kenneth Welsh)
- Die Hard with a Vengeance (1998 Fuji TV edition) – Arab Caddie (Aasif Mandvi)
- Homicide: Life on the Street – John Munch (Richard Belzer)
- Law & Order: Special Victims Unit – John Munch (Richard Belzer)
- The Muppet Christmas Carol – Gonzo, Miss Piggy, Dr. Bunsen Honeydew, Ma Bear
- Muppet Treasure Island – Gonzo, Miss Piggy, Dr. Bunsen Honeydew
- Pompeii – Severus (Jared Harris)
- Pulp Fiction – Buddy Holly (Steve Buscemi)
- Safe House (2018 BS Japan edition) – Alec Wade (Liam Cunningham)

==== Animation ====
- Animaniacs – Pinky
- Pinky and the Brain – Pinky
- Batman: the Animated Series – G. Carl Francis
- Bartok the Magnificent – Vol
- Ben 10 – Sublimino
- Brave – The Crow
- Cloudy with a Chance of Meatballs 2 – Chester V
- Duck Dodgers – Narrator, Dr. I.Q. High
- Finding Nemo – Sheldon's dad
- The Grim Adventures of Billy and Mandy – Singing Meteor, Van Helsing
- Hotel Transylvania – Pilot
- Ice Age – Zeke
- The Lion Guard – Zazu
- The Lion King – Zazu
- The Lion King 1½ – Zazu
- The Lion King II: Simba's Pride – Zazu
- Looney Tunes – Wile E. Coyote
- Noddy's Toyland Adventures – Narrator, Sly the Goblin
- Quest for Camelot – Bladebeak
- Recess – Mr. E
- The Batman – Shadow Thief
- The Prince of Egypt – Huy
- The Swan Princess: Escape from Castle Mountain – Bromley
- The Swan Princess: The Mystery of the Enchanted Kingdom – Bromley
- The Simpsons – Artie Ziff
- Teenage Mutant Ninja Turtles – Splinter, Krang
- Teenage Mutant Ninja Turtles III – Splinter
- Teen Titans – Mad Mod
- Thomas & Friends – Skarloey (Season 9-24, succeeding Tomohisa Asō)
- Thumbelina – King Colbert
- Titan A.E. – Gune
- Toy Story That Time Forgot – The Cleric
- TUGS – Zak, Burke, Scuttlebutt Pete, Puffa, Jack the Grappler, The Shrimpers
- Ultimate Spider-Man – Grandmaster
- X-Men: The Animated Series – Mojo
