= Metal Brothers =

Japanese music duo

- Origin: Japan
- Genre: Anison
- Years active: 1997–1998
- Label: Columbia Music Entertainment
- Members: Metal #1; Metal #2

The Metal Brothers (鋼鉄兄弟, Kōtetsu Kyōdai) are a vocal group composed of Hironobu Kageyama and Masaaki Endoh as the fictional Metal #1 (鋼鉄1号, Kōtetsu Ichigō; born February 18, 2961) and Metal #2 (鋼鉄2号, Kōtetsu Nigō; born August 28, 2967), respectively, debuting in 2997 (each year is 1000 years later than the actual date). Together, the Metal Brothers released two full-length albums of covers of anime songs and two singles of original songs. They have also performed various original songs for the Super Robot Wars series. The group has not released any more music since the inception of JAM Project.

== Discography ==
=== Albums ===
- ROBOMETAL ZZZ (ROBOMETAL ZZZ, Robometaru Toripuru Zēta; 1997)
- ROBOMETAL II: Steel Embrace (ROBOMETAL II～鋼の抱擁～, Robometaru Tsū ~Kō no Hōyō~; 1998)

=== Singles ===
- "BRAVE HEART" (1998)
  - Used as the opening for "Bakusō Kyōdai Let's & Go!! MAX" (爆走兄弟レッツ&ゴー!!MAX, Bakusō Kyōdai Rettsu Endo Gō!! Makkusu)
- "METAL BROTHERS ~Kō no Chikai~" (METAL BROTHERS～鋼の誓い～; "Metal Brothers (Steel Vow))

=== Other songs ===
- "WONDER GENERATION!" (1998)
  - Insert song in Tetsuwan Tantei Robotack
- "RIDE on DREAM" (1998)
- "Far Away" (1998)
- "MUTEKI Fight it out" (1998)
- "Kaze no Yell" (風のYell, Kaze no Ēru; 1998)
  - Insert songs in Bakusō Kyōdai Let's & Go!! MAX

== See also ==
- Hironobu Kageyama
- Masaaki Endoh
- Animetal
- JAM Project
