= R.o.r/s =

Japanese musical group

r.o.r/s
- Origin: Japan
- Genre: J-pop
- Years active: 2003
- Label: King
- Past members: Masami Okui, Chihiro Yonekura
- Website: www.starchild.co.jp/artist/rors/

r.o.r/s (Reflections of Renaissance/Sounds) was a short lived Japanese music group, formed in 2003 by Masami Okui and Chihiro Yonekura. The group was managed by the record company King Records. The group released two singles ("Candy Lie" KICM-91082 and 2nd Maxi Single "Tattoo Kiss" KICM-1087) and one album ("dazzle" KICS-1037 2003) before Okui left the group.

The song Tattoo Kiss was used as the third opening of the anime Kaleido Star.
