= Nebulus (video game) =

1987 video game

- Cover artwork by Steve Weston
- Developer: Hewson Consultants
- Publishers: Hewson Consultants; U.S. Gold; Triffix Entertainment
- Designer: John M. Phillips
- Composers: John M. Phillips; David Whittaker (Game Boy/NES)
- Platforms: Amiga, Atari ST, ZX Spectrum, Amstrad CPC, Commodore 64, Game Boy, NES, Atari 7800, Acorn Archimedes, MS-DOS
- Release: 1987; Game Boy: NA: May 1991; JP: October 30, 1992
- Genre: Platform
- Mode: Single-player

Nebulus is a vertically scrolling platform game created by John M. Phillips and published by Hewson Consultants in the late 1980s for home computer systems. International releases and ports were known by various other names: Castelian, Kyorochan Land (キョロちゃんランド, Kyorochan Rando), Subline, and Tower Toppler. The player climbs a cylindrical tower studded with platforms. The tower rotates as the player moves horizontally, giving a 3D effect.

The game's original 8-bit release received some critical acclaim, in particular the Commodore 64 release, which garnered a Gold Medal award from UK magazine Zzap!64.

Nebulus was followed by the lesser-known Nebulus 2 for the Amiga in the 1990s.

== Gameplay ==
Amiga version

Palm OS screenshot

Nebulus is a platform game. The player character, a green creature called Pogo, is on a mission to destroy eight towers that have been built in the sea by placing bombs at the towers' peaks.

The actual gameplay happens at each tower in turn. Pogo starts from the bottom and finds the way to the top. The towers are cylinder-shaped and have ledges on the outside, either horizontal forming stairs or connected by elevators. A notable feature of the game is that when Pogo walks left or right, the tower behind him turns clockwise or counterclockwise with a convincing sense of depth. This was noted favourably in reviews of the game.

During the ascent, Pogo encounters many different enemies, mostly shaped like basic geometric shapes. Pogo can shoot some of the enemies, while others are impervious to being shot. Contact with an enemy knocks Pogo down to the ledge below. If there is no ledge below, Pogo falls into the sea and drowns.

At the top of the tower, Pogo enters a door to trigger the tower's destruction mechanism. Pogo then boards his submarine and enters a bonus stage (in some versions, but not for example in the ZX Spectrum version), where he can shoot various kinds of fish to score bonus points.

== Releases and ports ==
Castelian, the Game Boy port

The game was originally released by Hewson for the ZX Spectrum, Amstrad CPC, Commodore 64, Commodore Amiga, Atari ST and Acorn Archimedes. The US version, which was published by U.S. Gold, was released under the title Tower Toppler. A version for the Atari 7800 was also released with this title.

The Game Boy and Nintendo Entertainment System versions of Castelian were developed by Bits Studios and released in the United States by Triffix and in Japan by Hiro Entertainment; in these, the lead character is called Julius. The Game Boy and Nintendo versions were later released in Japan as Kyoro Chan Land, which replaced Julius with Kyorochan, jewels with Chocoballs, altered the enemy graphics and (in the Famicom version) implemented a password system and a pause feature. The Italian bootleg version was called Subline. The Nintendo versions were composed by David Whittaker, and the title songs were covered by Whittaker from the original Tower Toppler game's title screen. In the Famicom version, the title screen plays what is the bonus game theme from the US version.

In 2004 it was re-released on the C64 Direct-to-TV. The C64 DTV version made comeback on the Wii's Virtual Console download service in Europe on June 13, 2008 and later in North America on May 4, 2009.

== Reception ==
Reception

Review score
Publication	Score
Zzap!64	97%

Awards
Publication	Award
Crash	Crash Smash
Your Sinclair	Megagame
Amstrad Action	Mastergame

Compute! stated that the Commodore 64 version of Tower Toppler had "good arcade action, with well-executed graphics". Orson Scott Card wrote in the magazine that "the graphics are terrific ... As science fiction, it's fun, but shallow. As an action game, it's just plain fun". Computer Gaming World gave the game a positive review. It earned a Zzap! Gold Medal Award.

The game was voted Best Original Game Of The Year at the Golden Joystick Awards. The ZX Spectrum version was rated number 30 in the Your Sinclair Official Top 100 Games of All Time. The Amiga version was ranked the 14th best game of all time by Amiga Power.
