= Chiaki Ishikawa =

Japanese singer-songwriter (born 1969)

Chiaki Ishikawa 石川智晶
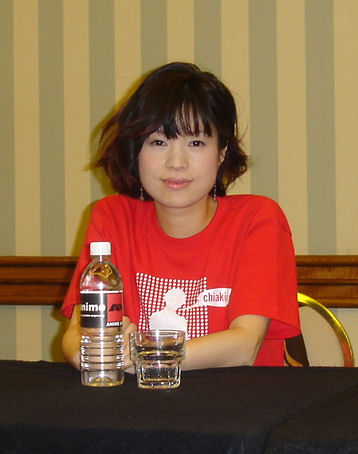
- Chiaki Ishikawa at Anime Expo 2007

Background information
- Born: March 29, 1969 (age 57)
- Origin: Tokyo, Japan
- Occupation: Singer
- Years active: 1993–present
- Label: Victor Entertainment
- Member of: See-Saw
- Website: http://www.chiakiishikawa.com/

Chiaki Ishikawa (石川智晶, Ishikawa Chiaki; previously 石川 知亜紀 before 2005, born March 29, 1969 in Tokyo, Japan) is a Japanese singer-songwriter. She is also the lead vocalist of Japanese musical duo See-Saw. Many of her songs, both solo and with See-Saw, have been used as theme songs in various anime series. Since 2003, her popularity abroad as part of See-Saw and as a solo artist has risen significantly. She made an appearance at Anime Expo 2007 as a Guest of Honor. She has also performed at Animelo Summer Live in 2006, 2008, 2009, 2010, 2011, and 2012 including collaborations with Chihiro Yonekura in 2008, Angela in 2009 and Minori Chihara in 2012, and being one of the artists in the Animelo Summer Live theme song singles in 2006, 2008, 2009 and 2010. She has also been a guest performer at the C3 anime convention in Hong Kong.

In 2012, she held two solo live concerts in each of Osaka and Tokyo, the latter held at Garden, Shimo-kitazawa.

In July 2012, she performed at the Firefly anime festival in Guangzhou, China.

In January 2013, she starred in a play Kagerou Pain (陽炎ペイン) which featured her singing several of her songs.

On May 13, 2013, she appeared at an in-store live at Tower Records Shinjuku with Natsumi Kon to promote the OP and ED singles from Ginga Kikotai Majestic Prince.

On June 14, 2013, she held a solo live concert in Shibuya.

in July 2013 she performed in a concert in Shanghai, China with Maon Kurosaki.

On August 11, 2013, she performed four songs live at Otakon 2013, opening for Yoko Kanno's PianoMe concert.

On August 29, 2013, she held a sold-out solo concert in Shibuya O-East, singing 19 songs.

== Discography ==
=== Maxi Singles ===
#	Single information	Sales
Debut	"Like an angel / Ame no Hi ni Koi wo Shita": Released: February 4, 2004; Oricon top 200 position: did not chart; Theme song from: Mermaid's Forest	---
2nd	"Utsukushi Kereba Sore de Ii": Released: April 19, 2006; Oricon top 200 position: #34; Theme song from: Simoun	7,400
3rd	"Namida": Released: March 21, 2007; Oricon top 200 position: #158; Theme song from: Bakumatsu Kikansetsu Irohanihoheto	600
4th	"Uninstall": Released: June 13, 2007; Oricon top 200 position: #13; Theme song from: Bokura no	22,400
5th	"1/2": Released: November 21, 2007; Oricon top 200 position: #58; Theme song from: You're Under Arrest: Full Throttle	3,400
6th	"Prototype": Released: December 3, 2008; Oricon top 200 position: #3; Theme song from: Mobile Suit Gundam 00 Second Season	49,703
7th	"First Pain": Released: July 29, 2009; Oricon top 200 position: #45; Theme song from: Element Hunters	3,217
8th	"Gyakko": Released: August 4, 2010; Oricon top 200 position: #32; Theme song from: Sengoku Basara: Samurai Heroes	6,015
9th	"Mou Nani mo Kowakunai, Kowaku wa Nai": Released: October 6, 2010; Oricon top 200 position: #18; Theme song from: Mobile Suit Gundam 00 The Movie: A wakening of the Trailblazer	7,913
10th	"Fukanzen Nenshou / Switch ga Haittara": Released: July 27, 2011; Oricon top 200 position: #19; Theme song from: Kamisama Dolls	12,542
11th	"Sayonara Tte iu / Sono Gyaku": Released: April 17, 2013; Theme song from: Ginga Kikotai Majestic Prince	

=== Albums ===
#	Album information	Sales
Debut	Magnolia: Released: June 23, 1999; Oricon top 200 position: did not chart	---
2nd	Inner Garden: Released: December 3, 2003; From singles: Like an angel/Ame no Hi ni Koi wo Shita; Oricon top 200 position: #231	1,200
3rd	Boku wa Mada Nanimo Shiranai: Released: August 22, 2007; From singles: Utsukushi Kereba Sore de ii, Namida and Uninstall; Oricon top 200 position: #23	15,861
4th	Daremo Oshiete Kurenakatta Koto: Released: September 30, 2009; From singles: 1/2 (hanbun), Prototype and First Pain; Oricon top 200 position: #28	8,508
5th	Kono Sekai o Darenimo Katarasenai Yō Ni: Released: April 25, 2012; From singles: Gyakko, Mou Nani mo Kowakunai, Kowaku wa Nai and Fukanzen Nenshou	
6th	Zenya: Released: March 5, 2014; Oricon weekly charts: #52	
7th	Watashi no Kokoro wa Sou Ittenai: Released: October 8, 2014; Oricon weekly charts: #43	1,760
8th	Monogatari no Saisho to Saigo wa Iranai: Released: September 16, 2015	
9th	Swan no Yume ga Imi Suru Mono Wa: Released: March 8, 2017	---

=== Other ===
Little bird
Featured in Uninstall single, Bokurano first ending theme
Vermillion
Featured in Uninstall single, Bokurano second ending theme
Rakurui
Sengoku Basara (anime) insert song
Ta Ga Tame Ni (誰がために; Who For)
from the album Another Sound Of 009 Re: Cyborg
Respect Me
Ginga Kikotai Majestic Prince third ending theme

=== Songs written for other vocalists ===
"Ai ni Kite" (逢いにきて; "Come to see", 1994)
Lyrics and music
Performed by Hiromi Nagasaku
"Bokutachi no Start" (僕たちのスタート, Bokutachi no Sutāto; "Our Start" 1995)
Lyrics and music
Jura Tripper OP, Performed by Hironobu Kageyama
"Ima, Kono Shunkan ga Subete" (今、この瞬間がすべて; "Now, all at this moment", 2003)
Lyrics only
Performed by Sōichirō Hoshi; Mobile Suit Gundam SEED image song
"Blast of Wind", 2007
Lyrics only
Performed by Saori Kiuji; Kaze no Stigma OP
"Te no Naka no Eien" (手の中の永遠; "Forever in the hand", 2008)
Lyrics only
Performed by Kaori Hikita; Hatenko Yugi ED
"Taiyo / after image" (太陽 / after image; "Sun / after image", 2008)
Lyrics and music to both songs
Performed by Hiroyuki Yoshino; Mobile Suit Gundam 00 Character CD
"12-banme no‥" (12番目の・・; "12th..", 2009)
Lyrics and music
Performed by Chihiro Yonekura
"Tsumetai Tsuki no Shita de Nakereba Hibikanai" (冷たい月の下でなければ響かない; "If it's not under the cold moon, it doesn't resonate", 2010)
Lyrics only
Performed by hibiku
"Kono sekai no mono de kono sekai no monodenai sakushi" (この世界のモノでこの世界の者でない; "Who are not of this world in the things of this world", 2012)
Lyrics only
Performed by Minori Chihara
"Strawberry Pain", 2012
Lyrics only
Performed by Manami Numakura
"Prime Number (Kimi to Deaeru Hi)" ("Prime Number ~君と出会える日~"; , 2013)
Lyrics only
Performed by Asuka Ookura, Sakura-sō no Pet na Kanojo ED
"Soprano" (ソプラノ; "Soprano", 2013)
Lyrics and music
Performed by Ayahi Takagaki
"Watashi wa Sozosuru" (私は想像する; "I imagine", 2013)
Lyrics and music
Performed by Natsumi Kon, Ginga Kikotai Majestic Prince OP

=== See-Saw ===
See See-Saw discography
