= Sevenger Fight =

- Online poster release, featuring Sevenger itself.
- Genre: Tokusatsu; Sci-Fi; Action/Adventure; Superhero; Kaiju
- Created by: Tsuburaya Productions
- Written by: Junichiro Ashiki
- Directed by: Kiyotaka Taguchi
- Voices of: Kohshu Hirano; Rima Matsuda; Hikari Kuroki; Takaya Aoyagi
- Composer: Hijiri Anze
- Country of origin: Japan
- No. of episodes: 10 (Note: 7 online episodes + 3 DVD exclusives)

Production
- Running time: 5–10 minutes

Original release
- Network: Tsuburaya Imagination
- Release: March 17 – April 23, 2021

Related
- Ultra Galaxy Fight

Sevenger Fight (セブンガーファイト, Sebungā Faito) is a Japanese tokusatsu miniseries, presented as a spin-off of Ultraman Z, directed and written by Kiyotaka Taguchi and Junichiro Ashiki, respectively. The miniseries consists of 10 episodes, with the first to seventh episodes available in Tsuburaya Imagination, Tsuburaya Productions' digital platform service as pay-per-view content. The remaining three were recognized as Suflan Island Trilogy (スフラン島3部作, Sufuran-tō San-busaku) and is set to be released as a home video content bundled with the Ultraman Z Perfect Super Complete Works STORAGE Box (ウルトラマンZ完全超全集ストレイジBOX, Urutoraman Zetto Kanzen Chōzenshū Sutoreiji Bokkusu) magazine, scheduled to be released in July 2021.

== Synopsis ==
Sevenger Fight focuses on the exploits of the SAA 1 Sevenger after being deployed by STORAGE members, with Haruki usually piloting it to confront daily monster attacks as Yoko, Yuka and Hebikura (Juggler) giving their commentary. The first and second episodes took place prior to Ultraman Z's arrival, the third to fifth episodes are pertaining to incidents happen during the titular series and the sixth and seventh episodes take place after Haruki and Ultraman Z's departure from Earth.

The Suflan Island Trilogy focuses on STORAGE trying to protect the Global Allied Forces facility stationed in the titular Suflan Island (スフラン島, Sufuran-tō) for a freezing operation, defending the facility from incoming monster army attacks and eventually concludes with a guest appearance of Ultraman Leo.

== Episodes ==
1. Killer Move! Sevenger Haze Slash (必殺！セブンガーかすみ斬り, Hissatsu! Sebungā Kasumi Giri)
2. Behold the SAA's True Intention (本家特空機の意地を見せろ, Honke Tokkūki no Iji o Misero)
3. I'll Paint That Bullet With Your Blood (その銃弾で血に染めろ, Sono Jūdan de Chi ni Somero)
4. Operation: Dancan Capture! (ダンカン捕獲作戦！, Dankan Hokaku Sakusen!)
5. Sublime! Sevenger's Retirement Match (壮絶！セブンガー引退試合, Sōzetsu! Sebungā Intai Jiai)
6. The Lawless Monster Planet (怪獣無法惑星, Kaijū Muhō Wakusei)
7. The Return of the Red Guy (帰ってきた赤いあいつ, Kaettekita Akai Aitsu)
8. The Fortress Robot of Horror (恐怖の要塞ロボット, Kyōfu no Yōsai Robotto)
9. Scorch! Freeze! Hell!! (灼熱！凍結！大地獄!!, Shakunetsu! Tōketsu! Dai Jigoku!!)
10. When the Eyes of the Lion Shine! (獅子の瞳が輝く時！, Shishi no Hitomi ga Kagayaku Toki!)

== Production ==
The idea of a standalone Sevenger series was conceived by Taguchi as early as the filming of Ultraman Z episode 3 in Mt. Iwafune, focusing on Sevenger's fight against Guigass near the observatory. At some point in time later on, Taguchi brought up the idea when Tsuburaya started to launch their online subscription service and Shogakukan at the same time wanted more content for the Ultraman Z Super Complete Works magazine. As both parties accepted the idea, production of the series took place in November 2020 at Mt. Iwafune. Although Sevenger Fight was done in the idea of parodying Ultra Fight and Redman, the production team wanted to make the miniseries faithfully accurate to the world view of Ultraman Z.

Whereas Sevenger is portrayed the same suit used in Ultraman Z, the rest of the appearing monsters were portrayed by attraction suits provided by Tsuburaya's Kaiju Warehouse.

On June 3, 2021, a pay-per-view virtual event was held for an international audience for the worldwide broadcast of Sevenger Fight with English subtitles. The event includes Rima Matsuda, Takaya Aoyagi, Kiyotaka Taguchi and Sean Nichols of Ultraman Max as panelists. The first 500 purchasers of the online tickets include a free commemoration pin of the Ultraman series. On the same day also included Alien Barossa, one of the many appearing monsters/aliens in Ultraman Z, to interrupt the online event under the pretense of being envy towards Sevenger's popularity.

== Voice cast ==
- Haruki Natsukawa (ナツカワ ハルキ, Natsukawa Haruki): Kohshu Hirano (平野 宏周, Hirano Kōshū)
- Yoko Nakashima (ナカシマ ヨウコ, Nakashima Yōko): Rima Matsuda (松田 リマ, Matsuda Rima)
- Yuka Ohta (オオタ ユカ, Ōta Yuka): Hikari Kuroki (黒木 ひかり, Kuroki Hikari)
- Shota Hebikura (ヘビクラ ショウタ, Hebikura Shōta)/Jugglus Juggler (ジャグラスジャグラー, Jagurasu Jagurā): Takaya Aoyagi (青柳 尊哉, Aoyagi Takaya)

== See also ==
- Ultraman Z
