= Uninstall (song) =

Single by Chiaki Ishikawa

from the album Boku wa Mada Nani mo Shiranai
- A-side: "Uninstall"
- B-side: "Little Bird"
- Released: June 13, 2007
- Genre: Pop rock, anison
- Length: 19:40
- Label: Victor Entertainment
- Songwriter: Ishikawa

Chiaki Ishikawa singles chronology
"Namida" (2007)	"Uninstall" (2007)	"1/2 (Hanbun)" (2007)

"Uninstall" (アンインストール, An'insutōru) is a single by Japanese singer-songwriter Chiaki Ishikawa. "Uninstall" and "Little Bird" are known as the theme songs for the anime Bokurano: Ours. "Uninstall" reached the number 13 spot on the Oricon's weekly charts, remaining on the charts for a total of 16 weeks.

"Uninstall"'s popularity in the Japanese Internet communities led to its constant inclusion in the Kumikyoku Nico Nico Douga mashups.

== Track listing ==
All music is composed by Chiaki Ishikawa.

No.	Title	Length
1.	"Uninstall"	4:47
2.	"Little Bird"	5:10
3.	"Uninstall (without vocal)"	4:48
4.	"Little Bird (without vocal)"	5:10
Total length:		19:40
