= Lazy (band) =

Japanese rock band

- Origin: Osaka, Japan
- Genres: Hard rock; heavy metal; pop rock (early years)
- Years active: 1973–1981, 1998–present
- Labels: RCA (1977–1981); Ayres (1998–1999); Lantis (2000–present)
- Spinoffs: Loudness
- Members: Hironobu Kageyama; Akira Takasaki; Shunji Inoue
- Past members: Hiroyuki Tanaka; Munetaka Higuchi

Lazy (Japanese: レイジー, Hepburn: Reijī; stylized as LAZY) is a Japanese rock band founded in 1973 by young classmates Hironobu Kageyama, Hiroyuki Tanaka and Akira Takasaki.

== History ==
Lazy was formed in 1973 by young classmates Hironobu Kageyama, Hiroyuki Tanaka and Akira Takasaki. They soon recruited, from their own school, drummer Munetaka Higuchi and keyboard player Shunji Inoue to complete the line-up. The name Lazy was taken from Deep Purple's song of the same name and the music the new band wanted to play was orientated towards hard rock. Managers and producers instead envisioned the young musicians as ideal prototypes for pop idols and created, through the use of monikers, costumes and well-balanced singles, a successful "boy band" for the Japanese teenage market. Lazy made their debut with the single "Hey! I Love You!" on July 25, 1977.

Beginning with Lazy's third studio album Rock Diamond (1979), which was partially recorded in Hawaii, the band members started writing and recording their own songs, slowly changing the sound of the band from easy-listening pop rock to harder rock. Their fourth studio album Lazy V does not feature any songs written by the band, but does retain a rock sound. During their summer tour in 1980, the members made a declaration towards hard rock. At the end of that year, they released the resulting album, Earth Ark. The album, featuring artwork by Noriyoshi Ohrai, has since become their best-selling work. However, Earth Ark turned out to be their last, as Lazy amicably announced they were breaking up at a concert on February 18, 1981. Higuchi, who was the oldest member of the band, acted as leader of the group and would be the one to negotiate with their office on matters such as living arrangements. He became disliked by the office and there was talk of someone being kicked out, so the members stuck together and all left. They officially disbanded on May 31, 1981. Each member of Lazy became known on their own, mainly in the soundtrack recording business, or formed other bands like Loudness.

Lazy reunited in 1997 for a new album and a tour, and intermittently in the following years to do several projects together. On September 1, 2006, bassist Tanaka died of heart failure at the age of 46. On November 30, 2008, drummer Higuchi died at the age of 49. In 2009 they recorded a new single version of "Kanjite Knight" (感じてKnight), together with Kageyama's JAM Project, for the 2009 anime Shin Mazinger Shogeki! Z Hen, performed under the name "Ultimate Lazy for Mazinger". The single "Reckless" was released in 2011 for the second animated film in the Towa no Quon series.

== Members ==
- Vocals: Hironobu "Michell" Kageyama
- Guitar: Akira "Suzy" Takasaki
- Keyboard: Shunji "Pocky" Inoue

Former members

- Bass: Hiroyuki "Funny" Tanaka (died 2006)
- Drums: Munetaka "Davy" Higuchi (died 2008)

Other members

- Tamio Okuda has participated in some Lazy projects since the deaths of Hiroyuki Tanaka and Munetaka Higuchi.
- Kazuyoshi Saito has participated in some Lazy projects since the deaths of Hiroyuki Tanaka and Munetaka Higuchi.

== Discography ==
=== Studio albums ===
- This is the Lazy (1978/03/05)
- Dream a Dream (1978/12/05)
- Rock Diamond (1979/09/05)
- Lazy V (1980/04/05)
- Earth Ark (宇宙船地球号, Uchuusen Chikyuugou; 1980/12/16)
- Happy Time (1998/07/21)
- Earth Ark II (宇宙船地球号II, Uchuusen Chikyuugou II; 2002/11/06)

=== EPs ===
- Angelique: Eien no Yakusoku (2001/01/24)
- Zone of the Enders (2001/05/23)

=== Live albums ===
- Lazy wo Oikakero (1978/05/06)
- Moetsukita Seishun (1981/04/05)
- Happy Time Tour '98: Kuro Zukin no Nasu ga Mama (1998/04/21)

=== Compilation albums ===
- Collection – Jounetsu no Seishun (1979/03/21)
- Best Hit Lazy (1980/12/01)
- Best (1981)
- Best Collection 1977–1981 (1999/02/21)
- Hit Collection (1999/11/20)
- Golden Best (2004/12/22)

=== Singles ===
Title	Release date
Hey! I Love You!	July 25, 1977
Camouflage	October 25, 1977
Akazukin Chan Goyoujin	October 25, 1977
Moeru Rock 'n' Roll Fire	May 5, 1978
Jigoku no Tenshi	July 25, 1978
Hello Hello Hello	October 25, 1978
Ai ni wa Ai wo	May 2, 1979
Baby I Make a Motion	June 5, 1979
Midnight Boxer	January 5, 1980
Kanashimi wo Buttobase	May 21, 1980
Kanjite Night	August 21, 1980
Glass no Heart	April 5, 1981
Ultra High	March 21, 1998
Pray	December 16, 1998
Angelique ~Eien no Yakusoku~	January 24, 2001
Zone of the Enders	May 23, 2001
Kanjite Knight (feat. Tamio Okuda, Saito Kazuyoshi & JAM Project)	April 22, 2009
Reckless	July 13, 2011
Slow and Steady	December 6, 2017

== Videography ==
- Happy Time Tour '98 ~Kuro Zukin no Nasu ga Mama~ (1998/10/21)
- Lazy Live 2002 Uchuusen Chikyuugou II ~Regenerate of a Lasting Worth~ (2002/06/04)
