= Cybuster =

Japanese anime television series

- North American DVD cover

魔装機神サイバスター (Masō Kishin Saibasutā)
- Genre: Isekai, Mecha, Science fiction, Fantasy
- Created by: Based on Super Robot Wars games by Banpresto
- Anime television series
- Directed by: Hidehito Ueda
- Produced by: Yū Saitō; Hirofumi Umeshita; Ken Matsumoto
- Written by: Akiyoshi Sakai
- Music by: Kazuo Nobuta; Kenichi Sudō
- Studio: Ashi Productions
- Licensed by: NA: Discotek Media
- Original network: TV Tokyo
- Original run: May 3, 1999 – October 25, 1999
- Episodes: 26

Cybuster (魔装機神サイバスター, Masō Kishin Saibasutā; lit. 'Demon Machine God Armor Cybuster') is a 26-episode anime produced by Bandai Visual, NAS, and TV Tokyo. It was animated by Ashi Productions and it aired in Japan between May 3, 1999, and October 25, 1999.

It is loosely based on original characters and the Cybuster mech from the video game series Super Robot Wars. The world of La Gias, where Cybuster takes place, is heavily influenced by Aura Battler Dunbine.

== Plot ==
The story is set in 2040 after a disaster happens in Tokyo in 2029. The main character Ken Andoh joins up with a company designated to clean up Tokyo, called DC. After a mysterious robot begins attacking the DC cleanup crews, the organization starts a process of militarization with Ken learning of the secrets it hides.

He then meets the mysterious robot's pilot Masaki and learns of another world called La Gias connected to Earth via Wormhole, where magic and the spirits rule over science, and that DC's experiments with black holes threaten to destroy both worlds. Armed with the robot from before: The Machine God Armor of wind Cybuster, Ken and his allies must stop DC from dooming both Earth and La Gias to eradication before it's too late.

== Characters ==
Ken Andoh (安藤ケン, Andō Ken)
Voiced by: Katsuaki Arima (Japanese); Sean Roberts (English)
A new recruit of DC. A headstrong man who wears his heart on his sleeve with an earnest desire to help others, he eventually comes to pilot the Machine God Armor of wind: Cybuster. Based on Masaki Ando from Super Robot Wars.
Mizuki Kamijo (上条ミズキ, Kamijō Mizuki)
Voiced by: Yuki Masuda (Japanese); Jennifer Sekiguchi (English)
Ken's hot-headed and belligerent childhood friend and another recruit of DC. Alike to Ken in many ways, the two constantly bicker with each other. Eventually granted control over the Machine God Armor of fire: Jaifer following Masaki's death.
Lyune Frank (リューネ・フランク, Ryūne Furanku)
Voiced by: Sumi Mutoh (Japanese); Cindy Robinson (English)
The proud and stuck-up daughter of Bian Frank, recruit of DC and pilot of the Valcyone. She is proud to be a member of the organization her father founded. Eventually chosen by the Machine God Armor of earth: Zamgede. Based on Lyune Zoldark from Super Robot Wars.
Masaki (マサキ, Masaki) / Junichi Kamijo (上条潤一, Kamijō Junichi)
Voiced by: Fumio Yoshioka (Japanese); Otto Towne (English)
A serene man with a mysterious air to him. He is in fact from the world of La Gias and seeks to stop the destruction of both worlds. Initially pilots the Cybuster, though later pilots Jaifer before sacrificing his life to save Ken and Mizuki from a black hole charge. He is truly Mizuki's older brother Junichi Kamijo, sent through a black hole to La Gias from Earth as a child. Based on Masaki Ando from Super Robot Wars.
Shu Zoldark (シュウ・ゾルダーク, Shū Zorudāku)
Voiced by: Akira Negishi (Japanese); Michael McConnohie (English)
The chief of DC following Bian's death and a man of science. His calm and reasonable demeanor belies his true arrogance, even killing Bian to take control of DC. He is actually from La Gias and was imprisoned in the space between dimensions for a rebellion against the spirits before being unleashed upon Earth in 2029 via a White Hole and seeks to return home by any means necessary. Based on Shu Shirakawa and Bian Zoldark from Super Robot Wars.
Saphine Grace (サフィーネ・グレイス, Safīne Gureisu)
Voiced by: Naoko Miura (Japanese); Joan-Carol O'Connell (English)
Shu's right-hand woman and Captain of DC. Cruel and vindictive to a fault, she's often the one to do Shu's dirty work, such as attempted assassinations and the planting of black hole charges around Tokyo. She is also from La Gias. Based on the character of the same name from Super Robot Wars.
Dallas (ダラス, Darasu)
Voiced by: Masamichi Sato (Japanese); Jemieson K. Price (English)
A mercenary hired by DC following Ken and Mizuki's betrayal who pilots the Prescion and an honorable warrior. Also from La Gias.
Izaki (イザキ, Izaki)
Voiced by: Kenji Nomura (Japanese); Ron Allen (English)
DC's drill instructor. Quick-tempered and slow-witted, he remains behind at DC despite being in far over his head. Sometimes compared to a Samurai.
Nanase Ozaki (尾崎ナナセ, Ozaki Nanase)
Voiced by: Yumiko Kobayashi (Japanese); Susan Myers (English)
A new recruit at DC and a close friend of Ken and Mizuki.
Sayuri Andoh (安藤サユリ, Andō Sayuri)
Voiced by: Ryoko Nagata (Japanese); Kay Jensen (English)
Ken's younger sister who suffers from extreme Asthma, she is kind and selfless to most people in spite of her semi-frequent asthma attacks. Eventually chosen by the Machine God Armor of water: Gottess.
Ryuzo Andoh (安藤竜蔵, Andō Ryūzō)
Voiced by: Junpei Morita (Japanese); Alfred Thor (English)
Ken and Sayuri's journalist father. His laid-back and jovial demeanor masks the pain he feels over his wife's death in 2029 he wears for his children's benefit and a distrust of DC. He has the nickname "Topps" among the people of Tokyo.
Ittetsu Kamijo (上条一徹, Kamijō Ittetsu)
Voiced by: Sanryo Odaka (Japanese); Abe Lasser (English)
Mizuki's father and a mechanic for DC. He was the closest to Bian Frank before he died and is the one to provide Ken and his allies with a secret base in Aokigahara and mechanical knowledge of DC's robots.

== Reception ==
Carlo Santos of Anime News Network was critical of the series, stating that he felt its plot was generic and something that had been done before, while also offering some praise for the character designs. Don Houston of DVD Talk felt the series got better in later parts and praised the robot fights.
