= Hironobu Kageyama =

Japanese musician, singer, and composer (born 1961)

Hironobu Kageyama 影山 ヒロノブ
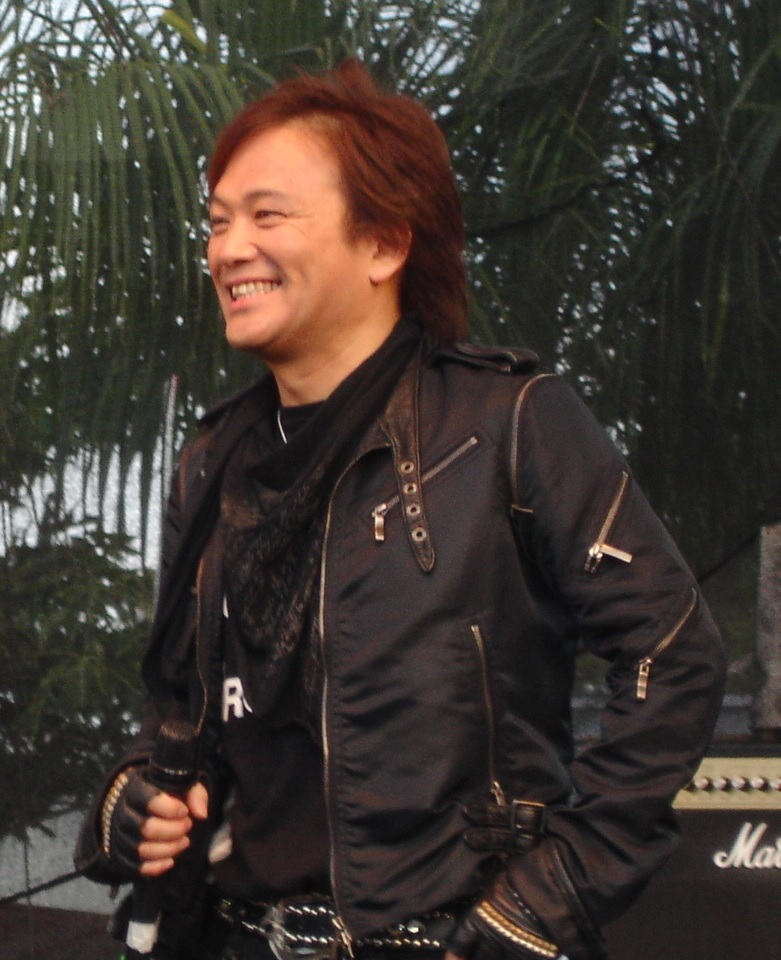
- Kageyama in Brasília in 2009

Background information
- Also known as: Kage; Nobuhiro Yamakage (山景 宣浩)
- Born: Hironobu Kageyama (景山 浩宣); February 18, 1961 (age 65); Higashisumiyoshi-ku, Osaka, Japan
- Genres: Hard rock; pop rock; heavy metal; anison; VGM; J-pop
- Occupations: Musician; singer; composer
- Instruments: Vocals; guitar; harmonica
- Years active: 1977–present
- Labels: Tokuma Japan; Columbia; Lantis; First Smile
- Member of: Lazy; JAM Project
- Formerly of: Metal Brothers; Broadway
- Website: airblanca.com

Hironobu Kageyama (Japanese: 影山 ヒロノブ, Hepburn: Kageyama Hironobu; real name written 景山 浩宣, born February 18, 1961) is a Japanese musician, singer and composer. He is best known for his work on anime, video game and tokusatsu soundtracks. Kageyama first rose to prominence as a teenager in the 1970s as lead singer of the rock band Lazy. Following their breakup in 1981, Kageyama began a solo career. He struggled until finding major success in the mid-1980s, when he started singing theme songs for anime and tokusatsu television shows. The music to such programs is called anison in Japan, and Kageyama became immensely popular, earning the nickname "Prince of the Anison World" (アニソン界のプリンス, Anison-kai no Purinsu).

Kageyama's best known works include the title tracks for Dengeki Sentai Changeman and Hikari Sentai Maskman, "Saint Shinwa ~Soldier Dream~" for Saint Seiya, and "Cha-La Head-Cha-La" for Dragon Ball Z. Lazy reunited in 1997, and Kageyama briefly worked with Masaaki Endoh as the duo Metal Brothers before they formed the anison supergroup JAM Project in 2000 with several other vocalists.

== Career ==
While still a high school student in Osaka, Kageyama formed the rock band Lazy with classmates Akira Takasaki and Shunji Inoue at age 16. The group appeared on Asahi Broadcasting, where they were discovered by Hiroshi Kamayatsu. The group moved to Tokyo and released five albums with Kageyama as their vocalist before breaking up in 1981. That year, Kageyama released his first solo album on the Tokuma record label. He would later describe the period after leaving Lazy as the hardest of his career, "I just couldn't find a good groove, and the crowd numbers at my gigs started to dwindle." For several years, he continued to work part-time at construction sites in order to support his family while continuing to play the music he loved.

He signed with Nippon Columbia in 1985. The director of Columbia recommended him to Toei as the singer of the opening theme to Dengeki Sentai Changeman. With his background in a rock band, Kageyama said the director revitalized his career by choosing him to sing that song as he wanted a rock singer who could sing the upbeat themes that were being written for anime in increasing numbers in the 1980s. The song, performed under the pseudonym "KAGE", led Kageyama to pivot to a career in anison. In 1988, he performed "Saint Shinwa ~Soldier Dream~" as the theme to Saint Seiya. The following year he was selected to sing the opening theme of Dragon Ball Z, "Cha-La Head-Cha-La". Kageyama referred to landing these two themes to anime adaptations of Weekly Shōnen Jump manga back to back as "what altered the direction of my life for good." "Cha-La Head-Cha-La" sold 1.7 million copies. In Kageyama's estimate, Columbia was behind about 70% of all anime songs being released at the time, so "Recording three or four songs in a day was a regular occurrence. It was just day after day of recording." Kageyama was part of a special team at Columbia called Project Monolith, which focused on music for Dragon Ball Z. It included himself, Shinichi Ishihara, Kuko (now known as "Ikuko") and Yuka as singers, Chiho Kiyooka and Hideki Matsutake as composers, and Sakiko Iwamuro and Dai Satō as lyricists. Kageyama estimated that he went on to sing around 70 songs for the Dragon Ball franchise as of 2021.

The Chōjin Sentai Jetman Hit Song Collection, which features songs Kageyama recorded for Chōjin Sentai Jetman, won a Japan Gold Disc Award in 1991. Kageyama's 1993 song "Suki Suki Suki" was certified Gold by the RIAJ for sales of 200,000 copies. Lazy reunited in 1997. Kageyama briefly worked with Masaaki Endoh as the duo Metal Brothers from 1997 to 1998. In 2000, he signed with Lantis, then run by his Lazy bandmate Inoue, and co-founded the anison supergroup JAM Project with Endoh and Ichiro Mizuki.

Along with Endoh, Kageyama hosted Anipara Ongakukan, a TV show that aired on the Kids Station Channel that showed live performances of the theme songs of recent anime and tokusatsu shows. The show was canceled in 2017. Kageyama is also the voice of Zaruba, a mystical talking ring, as well as the loyal ally and advisor to the titular hero of the tokusatsu franchise Garo, for which JAM Project has performed the opening themes.

== Personal life ==
Kageyama is married and the father of two daughters. His elder daughter, Risa (梨彩), is a voice actress and Korean-to-Japanese translator and interpreter. His younger daughter, Nana (菜奈), is a dancer, choreographer and singer-songwriter who has written songs with her father. Kageyama is an avid cyclist, and practices learning English via the TOEIC.

== Discography ==
=== Studio albums ===
- [1981.12.01] Broken Heart
- [1982.04.01] It's Live Runnin
- [1982.12.15] First at Last
- [1983.08.25] Horizon
- [1985.06.21] Born Again
- [2000.04.26] I'm in you.
- [2005.12.07] Cold Rain
- [2007.07.25] 30years3ounce
- [2012.02.08] Rock Japan
- [2017.07.25] A.O.R
- [2022.03.18] Hangeki no o Uchi Rock (反撃のおうちロック)

=== Soundtrack albums ===
- [1989.12.21] Dragon Ball Z Hit Song Collection II: Miracle Zenkai Power!!

=== Compilation albums ===
- [1989.02.25] The Best of Hironobu Kageyama
- [1992.03.21] Stardust Boys
- [1994.04.21] CYVOX
- [1996.04.20] Hironobu Kageyama Best Album 3: Mixture
- [1997.08.21] Hironobu Kageyama Eternity 20th Anniversary Box (影山ヒロノブ エタニティ 20周年記念BOX)
- [2004.04.07] Best & Live
- [2004.12.22] Golden☆Best
- [2018.08.06] Kage-chan Pack ~Kimi to Boku no Daikoushin~ (カゲちゃんパック 〜君と僕の大行進〜)

=== Live albums ===
- [1995.09.30] Power Live '95 CYVOX ~Complete Version~
- [1998.11.18] Power Live '98
- [2002.02.06] Akogi na Futaritabi Daze!! Live Album - Dai 1 Shou (Hironobu Kageyama & Masaaki Endoh collaboration)

=== Cover albums ===
- [2018.08.06] Dare ga Cover Yanen Anison Show (誰がカバーやねんアニソンショー)

=== Singles ===
- [1981.10.01] "Kyou wo Ikiyou" (今日を生きよう)
- [1982.03.01] "Try Me"
- [1982.08.25] "Hotondo Crazy" (ほとんどクレイジー)
- [1983.08.25] "Mayonaka no Dance" (真夜中のダンス)
- [1984.07.01] "Star Dust Memory"
- [1985.02.21] "Dengeki Sentai Changeman" (電撃戦隊チェンジマン)
- [1985.09.21] "Wakasa de Changeman" (若さでチェンジマン)
- [1985.04.21] "Natsu ga Kowarete Iku -Day Dream Blues-" (夏が壊れていく-Day Dream Blues-)
- [1985.11.21] "St. Elmo's Fire"
- [1986.02.01]"Stardust Boys" (スターダストボーイズ)
- [1986.05.01] "Honoo no Violence" (炎のバイオレンス)
- [1986.11.01] "Wild Boy" - credited to "Hironobu Kageyama with Do-ya"
- [1987.03.01] "Hikari Sentai Maskman" (光戦隊マスクマン)
- [1987.07.01] "The Headmasters" (ザ・ヘッドマスターズ)
- [1988.05.21] "Saint Shinwa ~Soldier Dream~" (聖闘士神話〜ソルジャー・ドリーム〜)
- [1989.05.01] "Cha-La Head Cha-La"
- [1991.02.21] "Chōjin Sentai Jetman" (鳥人戦隊ジェットマン)
- [1992.02.26] "Ready to Love"
- [1992.07.21] "Dark Water" (ダークウォーター)
- [1993.03.21] "Suki Suki Suki" (好き好き好き)
- [1993.04.21] "Skyscraper ~Mantenrou ni Dakarete~" (Skyscraper〜摩天楼に抱かれて〜)
- [1993.06.13] "Aka no Ryuusei Hata" (紅の流星機)
- [1993.07.21] "Cashian ~Kaze no Hakajirushi~" (キャシャーン〜風の墓標〜)
- [1993.08.21] "Tatakau Tame ni Umareta Senshi" (戦うために生まれた戦士)
- [1993.11.21] "We Gotta Power"
- [1994.01.21] "Hitomi wo Tojite Emilia" (瞳を閉じてエミリア)
- [1994.03.21] "Kiseki no Big Fight" (奇蹟のビッグ・ファイト)
- [1994.04.24] "We Are Reysol"
- [1994.06.21] "Do! Challenge"
- [1994.07.21] "Dragon Power ∞" (ドラゴンパワー∞)
- [1994.09.21] "Detazo! In Daijyougun!!" (出たぞ!隠大将軍!!)
- [1994.12.21] "Mini Yonku da! Let's & Go!!" (ミニ四駆だ!レッツ&ゴー!!)
- [1995.01.21] "Kishin Douji Zenki" (鬼神童子ZENKI)
- [1995.03.01] "Saikyou no Fusion" (最強のフュージョン)
- [1995.07.01] "Get Win the "J""
- [1995.07.21] "Boku-tachi no Start" (僕たちのスタート)
- [1995.07.21] "Ore ga Yaranakya Dare ga Yaru" (俺がやらなきゃ誰がやる)
- [1995.08.19] "Chou Kishin Zenki, Raigou Sei Rin!" (超鬼神ZENKI、来迎聖臨!)
- [1995.08.19] "Te to Te wo Tsunagou!" (手と手をつなごう!)
- [1995.10.21] "Dokkan Beat"
- [1996.03.20] "Power Up Turtles" (パワーアップ・タートルズ)
- [1996.07.24] "Get Up! V Magnum"
- [1996.10.19] "It Was 30 Years Ago"
- [1996.11.21] "One Dream, One Love"
- [1997.02.21] "Get the World"
- [1997.06.21] "Take a Journey"
- [1997.08.01] ""Ore-tachi" no Theme" (「俺たち」のテーマ)
- [1997.09.26] "Ganbare Goemon no Theme" (がんばれゴエモンのテーマ)
- [1998.02.21] "My Name is Cowboy" (My name is カーボーイ)
- [1998.02.28] "Naseba Naruhodo Robotack" (なせばなるほどロボタック)
- [1998.06.20] "Tetsuwan Tantei Robotack" (テツワン探偵ロボタック)
- [1998.07.18] "Tetsuwan Tantei Robotack 2" (テツワン探偵ロボタック2)
- [1998.09.21] "Power of Love"
- [1998.11.21] "Tetsuwan Tantei Robotack 3" (テツワン探偵ロボタック3)
- [1999.01.20] "Ame no Chi Egao Egao no Chihare" (アメノチエガオエガオノチハレ)
- [1999.01.21] "Heats"
- [1999.01.22] "Smile Again"
- [1999.06.17] "Baseball Tengoku" (ベースボール天国)
- [1999.08.01] "Win a Fight"
- [1999.11.20] "Kon no Evolution" (魂のエヴォリューション)
- [2000.01.19] "Hero wa Housou Naka" (ヒーローは放送中)
- [2000.01.21] "Sennen no Soldier" (千年のソルジャー)
- [2005.02.23] "Ore wa Tokoton Tomaranai!!" (俺はとことん止まらない!!)
- [2005.08.03] "Cha-La Head-Cha-La (2005 Ver.)"
- [2006.03.24] "Eternal Love 2006"
- [2006.11.29] "Fuuun Musou Ten" (風雲無双伝)
- [2008.12.25] "Hikari no Sasu Mirai e!" (光のさす未来へ!)
- [2009.11.25] "Progression"
- [2010.02.10] "Ever Last"
- [2010.10.10] "Battle of Omega"
- [2011.10.15] "Kiba -Tusk of Darkness-" (呀 〜Tusk of Darkness〜)
- [2013.06.12] "Yohsoro ~Hoshi no Umi wo Koete~" (ヨーソロー 〜星の海を越えて〜)
- [2022.10.26] "Kanata Tooku / Hikari Kanata" (カナタトオク/ヒカリカナタ)
- [2023.02.22] "Sora no Kanata e" (ソラノカナタへ)
- [2023.06.21] "Winner Win!"

=== Other singles ===
- [2008.07.23] "Super Survivor"
- [2012.04.25] "Give Lee Give Lee Rock Lee" (Give Lee Give Lee ロック・リー) - credited to "Animetal USA × Hironobu Kageyama"
- [2012.08.15] "Tatakae! Ganraizā" (闘え！ガンライザー)
- [2013.05.01] "Space Battleship Yamato" (宇宙戦艦ヤマト) - credited as part of "Project Yamato 2199"
- [2013.06.12] "Yōsorō ~Boshi no Umi o Koete~" (ヨーソロー 〜星の海を越えて〜)
- [2015.05.20] "Hippare! Monster Strike!" (ヒッパレ！モンスターストライク)
