= Chihiro Yonekura =

Chihiro Yonekura 米倉 千尋
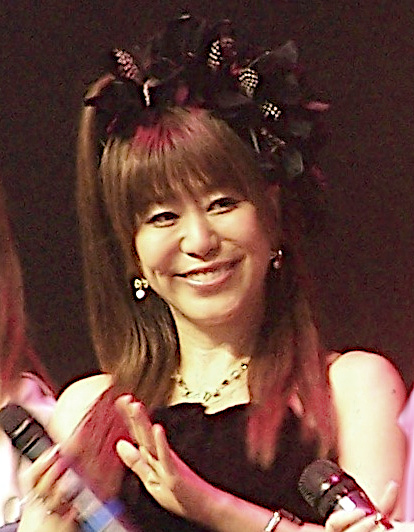
- Chihiro Yonekura at Anime Friends 2010

Background information
- Born: August 19, 1972 (age 54); Yokohama, Kanagawa, Japan
- Genres: J-pop
- Occupations: Singer, songwriter
- Instrument: Vocals
- Years active: 1999–present
- Labels: King; Bellwood
- Formerly of: r.o.r/s
- Website: yonekurachihiro.com

Chihiro Yonekura (米倉 千尋, Yonekura Chihiro; born August 19, 1972) is a Japanese singer and songwriter from Yokohama, Kanagawa, Japan.

== History ==
While Yonekura was attending university, she sent off several demonstration tapes to recording companies. She was scouted out, and received the opportunity to do the opening song "Arashi no Naka de Kagayaite" for the anime Mobile Suit Gundam: The 08th MS Team, as well as the ending song, "10 Years After". She debuted with a single containing both, which was successful. That same year she released three other singles and an album. C. 2003 she was a member of the band r.o.r/s. Yonekura quickly gained a large fan base, and many shows selected her songs for opening and ending themes. She has now been singing and touring for 10 years. To celebrate her success, she released an album in 2005 entitled Cheers.

== Discography ==
=== Singles ===
- 2011-02-23: Naked Soul (TOPGUN x Chihiro Yonekura) (PSP/Wii game "SD Gundam G Generation World" Opening)
- 2010-12-22: Seize the Days (Online game "Emil Chronicle Online" 5th anniversary song)
- 2008-02-28: Home
- 2007-03-14: Lion no Tsubasa (PS2 game Elvandia Story Theme song)
- 2006-06-21: Aozora to Kimi e
- 2006-01-12: ALIVE (Senkaiden Houshin Engi image song)
- 2005-07-06: Towa no Hana (Fushigi Yuugi Genbu Kaiten Gaiden: Kagami no Fujo PS2 Opening & Ending)
- 2005-02-23: Boku no Speed de (Mahoraba Heartful days Ending theme)
- 2004-01-15: Hoshi ni Naru made
- 2003-07-24: Yakusoku no Basho e (Kaleido Star theme song)
- 2003-01-22: Omoide ga Ippai
- 2002-09-25: Bridge (Gakuen Toushi Valanoir Opening & Ending)
- 2002-08-22: Natsu no Owari no Hanabi
- 2002-01-30: Hidamari o Tsurete
- 2001-10-31: Butterfly Kiss (GROOVE ADVENTURE RAVE Opening Theme)
- 2001-07-25: Little Soldier (Jikkyō Powerful Pro Yakyū 8 Image song)
- 2000-08-23: Hi no Ataru Basho / c/w WILL (acoustic version) (Senkaiden Houshin Engi character song Self-Cover)
- 2000-07-26: Return to myself( Rokumon Tengai Moncolle Knight Opening & Ending 2)
- 2000-02-02: Just Fly Away (Rokumon Tengai Moncolle Knight Opening & Ending 1)
- 1999-09-16: FEEL ME (Dreamcast game Revive ~Sosei~ Theme song)
- 1999-08-25: WILL (Senkaiden Houshin Engi Opening theme)
- 1999-01-08: Birth of light (High School Aura Buster OVA Theme song)
- 1998-07-23: Eien no Tobira (Mobile Suit Gundam: 08th MS Team: Miller's Report OVA Theme song)
- 1998-02-04: Strawberry Fields
- 1997-05-21: Yukai na Kodou (Kiko-chan Smile Theme song)
- 1997-02-21: Mirai no Futari ni (Mobile Suit Gundam: 08th MS Team Insert song)
- 1996-12-05: Yakusoku
- 1996-10-23: Orangeiro no Kiss o Ageyou
- 1996-06-21: Believe ~anata dake utsushitai~
- 1996-01-24: Arashi no Naka de Kagayaite (Mobile Suit Gundam: The 08th MS Team Opening & Ending)

=== Albums ===
- 2011-03-16: Nakeru Anison
- 2010-12-08: Voyager (15th Anniversary Best Album)
- 2009-09-30: Departure
- 2008-06-25: Ever After (anime cover album)
- 2007-04-25: Kaleidoscope
- 2006-02-08: Fairwings
- 2005-02-23: Cheers
- 2004-05-26: BEST OF CHIHIROX
- 2004-02-26: azure
- 2003-02-26: Spring ~start on a journey~
- 2002-03-13: jam
- 2001-02-21: Little Voice
- 2000-10-25: apples
- 1999-11-03: Colours
- 1998-08-21: always
- 1997-06-21: Transistor Glamour
- 1996-07-05: Believe

=== Other ===
- Mobile Suit Gundam: The 08th MS Team OST 2, Miller's Report
- Mobile Suit Gundam: The 08th MS Team OST 1
