= Z Mazinger =

Manga

- Ζ Mazinger
- Cover for volume 3 of Zeta Mazinger (d/visual edition)

Ζマジンガー (Zēta Majingā)
- Genre: Adventure, Mecha
- Manga
- Written by: Go Nagai
- Published by: Kodansha
- Magazine: Magazine Special
- Original run: September, 1998 – November, 2000
- Volumes: 5

Ζ Mazinger (Ζマジンガー, Zēta Majingā; sometimes romanized as Zeta Mazinger) is a retelling of the Mazinger Z story by Go Nagai, mixing it with ancient Greek mythology. Here, Greek myths are the human testimony of the epic battles between robots piloted by extraterrestrials. The appearance of the robot remains similar to the original Mazinger, but with a more modern look.

Set in contemporary times, the battle of the Gods (extraterrestrials thought to be Gods by the ancient Greeks) continues. Hades (in mythology, the ruler of the underworld, embodied by Dr. Hell) has returned to attack the Earth and exterminate the human race, and to protect it Zeus sends a robot born from him, Zeta Mazinger.

The robot is given by chance to a student called Koji Kabuto (the classic Mazinger hero) and together with Aphrodite (piloted by Sayaka) and other classic Mazinger characters such as Tetsuya he defends the planet. Many other gods are involved, and their relationships of love and envy are part of the plot.

Some elements of Zeta Mazinger appear in Mazinger Z: The Impact!, the most prominent being the apparition of Zeus in his Zeta Mazinger form.

== Manga information ==
=== Japanese edition ===
Vol.	Release date	ISBN
1	March 17, 1999	978-4063340464
2	July 16, 1999	978-4063340969
3	January 17, 2000	978-4063342758
4	May 17, 2000	978-4063343021
5	December 15, 2000	978-4063343588

=== Italian edition ===
Vol.	Release date	ISBN
1	July 3, 2004	978-4902751024
2	October 15, 2004	978-4902751079
3	December 17, 2004	978-4902751130
4	February 18, 2005	978-4902751246
5	April 15, 2005	978-4902751451
