= Mazinger Z vs. The Great General of Darkness =

1974 film by Nobutaka Nishizawa

- Directed by: Nobutaka Nishizawa
- Screenplay by: Susumu Takaku
- Starring: Hiroya Ishimaru; Kiyoshi Kobayashi; Ryōichi Tanaka
- Music by: Michiaki Watanabe
- Production companies: Dynamic Planning, Toei Animation
- Release date: July 25, 1974
- Running time: 43 minutes
- Country: Japan
- Language: Japanese

Mazinger Z vs. The Great General of Darkness (マジンガーＺ対暗黒大将軍, Majingâ Zetto tai Ankoku Daishôgun) is a 1974 Japanese mecha animated film that served as an alternative link between the Mazinger Z series and the Great Mazinger series. It basically introduces Great Mazinger to the audience, as well as his enemies from the Mikene Empire, showing the defeat of Mazinger Z. It was released on July 25, 1974.

The final episode of the Mazinger Z anime series would tell the story a bit differently, but with similar results in the plot.

The film was also one of the inspirations behind the 2002 standalone spinoff to the Mazinkaiser OVA, Deathmatch! Great General of Darkness (Mazinkaiser vs the Great Darkness General).

== Plot ==
Dr. Hell, Mazinger Z's main enemy, has been defeated and killed in battle, and finally Kouji Kabuto and the rest of his friends can take a break from their duty of defending Japan and the world from evil.

However, during a storm after a very hot day in the beach, Boss, Mucha and Nuke have a disturbing vision of a prophet that heralds the end of the world, claiming that the dead will raise and destroy the human race, and that the Great General of Darkness will attack from air, sea and land. The only hope of defense is an iron fortress, Mazinger.

When Boss tells these events to Koji and Sayaka, they mock him and disregard this prophecy as an illusion caused by the intense heat. They listen to music on the radio, but are interrupted by reports of attacks by bizarre monsters in several cities including London (attacked by Aquatic Beast Arimoth), Moscow (by Reptile Beast Gurosten), Paris (by Superhuman Beast Arsoth), and New York (by Aerial Beast Orbee).

In his base, Archduke Gorgon, who had outlived Hell and his servants, rejoices while watching the attacks, and decides that now it is Japan's turn to fall. At his command, beasts Dante, Saraga, Birdian, Raigon, Mommothos and Suruba emerge from the sea, heading for Tokyo. These are later revealed to be the Mycenae Empire's Warrior Beasts.

In the Photon Light Institute, Koji takes control of Mazinger and flies to the city, while Diana A and Boss Borot watch the monsters fly toward Tokyo. When he finally finds the monsters, Koji is surprised that unlike anything he has faced before, they are able to speak and seem to have a mind of their own. Mazinger had previously fought against Gorgon's monsters, but these are some of Mycenae's finest, and will not be so easy to take down.

He is first lured into the sea where he has to deal with Suruba, but manages to defeat her and goes back to the city, now completely under fire. The next monster he slaughters is Saraga, beheading both of its heads, but also receiving great damage in his wings from the beast's acid venom.

In the meantime, the Institute is reached by the monsters. The Super Barrier is quickly beaten by Dante's tornado, leaving Diana and Boss to stand for the building. They are no match to the powerful mecha and end up (as usual) literally in pieces. Now helpless, those in the Institute, including Shiro and Dr. Yumi, are forced to evacuate. Shiro forgets Koji's birthday present in a room, and returns to collect it. The violent hits on the walls cause the ceiling to weaken and fall, crushing Shiro.

Mazinger has some troubles of his own, since Raigon and Birdian are having their way with him. The mecha is heavily damaged and Koji quite wounded, but Sayaka's voice on the speaker telling him Shiro's life is in danger gives him the strength he needs to respond to the aggression. He destroys both monsters and rushes to be with his brother.

The Institute is in ruins, and Shiro is unconscious and needs a blood transfusion to survive. Koji volunteers, since they share their blood type, despite Yumi's reservations, because Koji has been under great stress during battle and has lost a large amount of blood. He will not listen and the procedure takes place moments after.

Mazinger Z is under extensive repair, but it will take a long time before the robot is completely ready to operate again. After the transfusion, Koji and the rest are waiting for Shiro to wake up, when suddenly the lights go out. The voice of the prophet is heard, announcing again the end of the world.

Looking for the source of these words, they come outside and find the ghostly character among the ruins. This time, he describes the enemy as the Great General of Darkness and his Seven Mikene Armies, and says that they will strike back. After that, Mazinger will be no more and the world will be submerged in the shadows forever. In the blink of an eye, he vanishes. When Dr. Yumi hears this, he recalls something Dr. Kabuto had told him about a long time ago, describing the same thing the prophet had told. He believes that maybe the answer could be in the notes of Koji's late grandfather.

After Mazinger's intromission, Gorgon goes down to the Mycenae underworld to inform the Great General of Darkness about the situation. He finds him upset for the loss of some of his favorite beasts, and demands to know who is responsible for it. Gorgon reports that Mazinger had stopped the attacks and that Dr. Hell had had many troubles with him in the past. The Dark General then commands General Juuma to take some monsters of his choice to Japan to annihilate the enemy, so that Mycenae can see daylight once more.

Dr. Kabuto's notes confirm what the prophet had said, the enemy has been dormant for thousands of years underground, waiting for the right moment to take over, and Yumi acknowledges that in the current conditions, Mazinger will not be able to defeat them. There is no time for hesitations since Juuma and his monsters are approaching Japan.

Koji spends a moment of solitude contemplating the pictures of his father and grandfather, and admits with tears in his eyes that even though he is scared and Mazinger is not repaired, he will do whatever it takes to succeed in this last mission, even if this means sacrificing his own life. Without him knowing, Sayaka listens to everything he says. Before leaving the Institute, he visits Shiro, who is waking up. Yumi tries to stop Koji on his way out, warning him that the transfusion has weakened him and it is not safe to fight in his state. Koji refuses to stay and leaves. In the Jet Pilder hangar, he finds Sayaka, who gives him the birthday gift Shiro was not able to give him.

Mommothos is the first to strike, but succumbs to Mazinger's breast fire. Using Jet Scrander, Koji reaches the place where the rest of the monsters are waiting for him, but is soon taken to the ground. Mazinger is now surrounded by many beasts led by Juuma. Their collective forces are more than what the robot can take at this point and Boss and Sayaka decide to help him by sending Boss Borot on a pair of Diana's missiles. By chance, Boss strikes directly on Dante, who was attacking Mazinger, and blows him into pieces. Wardam, the Insect Beast, sends him back to the Institute with a violent hit. After that, it is not long before Mazinger ends up stuck on a rock wall with a trident on its belly, badly battered.

Somewhere else, the Prophet reveals his true identity: he is Kenzo Kabuto, Koji's father, and orders Tetsuya Tsurugi to take action with his robot, Great Mazinger.

Koji is unconscious, and Shiro and Sayaka's gift, a musical box, plays on the floor of Jet Pilder. Just when Juuma is ready to finish Mazinger with his axe, it is intercepted by Great's Thunder Break. From that point on, one by one the monsters are destroyed by Tetsuya; Barungga is impaled by Mazinger Blade, Baruman is destroyed by Navel Missile, Warmdam is smashed by Atomic Punch, Orbee and Arimos are killed by Thunder Break, and Gurosten is sliced into two by Great Boomerang. Arsoth is destroyed by Mazinger, aided by Great Mazinger's Blades and the use of the Drill Missiles. The last one to die is Juuma, finished by both Mazingers' Breast Fire. Among his flaming remains, the cursing figure of the Great General of Darkness vows to come back and kill all of his enemies.

Koji and Tetsuya share a brief conversation where Tetsuya tells him that his robot is Z's brother, conceived to defeat the Seven Armies of Mikene. After this, he departs, leaving Koji wondering who could have built such a robot.
