= Mazinger Edition Z: The Impact! =

Japanese anime series

- Promotional pre-release cover art of the DVD #1.

真マジンガー 衝撃! Z編 (Shin Majingā Shōgeki! Zetto Hen)
- Genre: Mecha
- Anime television series
- Directed by: Yasuhiro Imagawa
- Produced by: Hasshu Tokuhara; Ichiko Nagai; Satsuki Mizuno; Yoshinaga Minami; Katsumi Koike; Koji Morimoto; Daiki Hasebe
- Written by: Yasuhiro Imagawa
- Music by: Akira Miyagawa
- Studio: Bee Media, Code
- Licensed by: NA: Discotek Media
- Original network: TXN (TV Tokyo), GBS
- Original run: April 4, 2009 – September 26, 2009
- Episodes: 26
- Manga

Shin Mazinger Zero
- Written by: Yoshiaki Tabata
- Illustrated by: Yuki Yogo
- Published by: Akita Shoten
- Magazine: Champion Red
- Original run: June 2009 – December 2012
- Volumes: 9
- Manga

Mazinger Edition H: The Impact!
- Written by: Go Nagai
- Published by: Akita Shoten
- Magazine: Champion Red Ichigo
- Published: August 19, 2009
- Manga

Shin Mazinger Zero vs. The Great General of Darkness
- Written by: Yoshiaki Tabata
- Illustrated by: Yuki Yogo
- Published by: Akita Shoten
- Magazine: Champion Red
- Original run: February 2013 – January 2016
- Volumes: 8

Mazinger Edition Z: The Impact!, known in Japan as True Mazinger Impact! Chapter Z (真マジンガー衝撃! Z編, Shin Majingā Shōgeki! Zetto Hen), translated in the Soul of Chogokin toys line as Shin Mazinger Impact Z!, is a Mazinger anime series, directed by Yasuhiro Imagawa (of G Gundam, Giant Robo and Getter Robo Armageddon fame) which premiered in Japan on April 4, 2009. According to the production staff, it has no relation to the 1970s show and should not be described as a Mazinger Z remake. The series is a "retelling" of the basic story of Mazinger Z, featuring most of the same characters, mechanical beasts, and some general plots of the original series, plus some additional material. It keeps the original plot line of Mazinger Z, but makes references to other Go Nagai works, such as Z Mazinger, Devilman, Violence Jack, Mao Dante, Abashiri Family, and others. Elements from other related Mazinger works appear in the series, such as the story of Kedora (based on an original Mazinger Z story by Ken Ishikawa) and the appearance of Energer Z, the original concept before Mazinger Z.

Along with the TV series, a new manga, Shin Mazinger Zero started on April 18, 2009 (cover date June 2009) in the magazine Champion Red. The pair responsible for the shōnen manga Akumetsu, Yoshiaki Tabata and Yuki Yogo, write and illustrate the Shin Mazinger Zero manga. In 2010 a game based on the series was released for the PC.

== Plot ==
In the near future, a mineral known as "Japanium" is discovered under Mount Fuji. This ore is discovered to produce a powerful energy source known as "Photon Energy". Dr. Juzo Kabuto and his associates have begun researching Photon Energy, planning to use it as a solution to the energy crisis plaguing the earth, when the nefarious Dr. Hell and his associate, Baron Ashura attack his lab. Along with this, the mysterious "Kurogane House" also has begun to become entwined with the affairs of these two parties. During all of this, Juzo's grandchildren, Kouji and Shiro, encounter one of Baron Ashura's robots on its way to attack Dr. Kabuto's mansion, where he has begun work on his greatest invention. Dr. Kabuto, seeing the danger at hand, sends out the Pilder to Kouji, allowing him to combine with the giant robot, Mazinger Z, to fight against Dr. Hell's forces.

== Characters ==
=== Kabuto family ===
- Kouji Kabuto (兜 甲児, Kabuto Kōji; played by Kenji Akabane): The protagonist of the story. After the death of his parents, Kouji works hard as the 'Mother Hen' to the surviving members of his family – his brother Shiro, and his grandfather Juzo. Kouji has a high regard for his grandfather, whose patented inventions were the source of the Kabuto family's income and shows zero tolerance to anyone who ever insults his grandfather. During the primary attack of Ashura Corps., Kouji becomes the pilot of his grandfather's greatest invention – the Super Robot Mazinger Z. Like previous incarnations, he is a hot-blooded young man who occasionally acts before he thinks.
- Shiro Kabuto (兜 シロー, Kabuto Shirō; played by Ayumi Fujimura): Koji's younger brother.
- Juzo Kabuto (兜 十蔵, Kabuto Jūzō; played by Taimei Suzuki): Koji's grandfather and the creator of Mazinger Z. Known as a great robotics engineer in addition as the man who discovered the Japanium Ore, which led to the creation of the Photon Energy and Super-Alloy Z (a metal alloy that is stronger than any other metal known to man). Along with Dr. Hell, he uncovered the Mechanical Beasts on Bardos Island but opposed him upon discovering the dangers of the Kedora.
- Kenzo Kabuto (兜 剣造, Kabuto Kenzō): The son of Juzo Kabuto and father of Koji and Shiro Kabuto. In the original series, Kenzo and his wife are believed to have been killed in an accident involving the construction of Mazinger Z. In reality, Kenzo survived and later built Great Mazinger in secret, without the knowledge of his sons. In Shin Mazinger, he is stated to have died previous to the series and a number of episodes are dedicated to Koji learning of the truth of his death. In the earlier Episodes, Kenzo was shown to be a traitor and followed Dr. Hell. Nishikiori Tsubasa was forced to kill Kenzo with the help and request of Tetsuya. But in Episode 26, it was shown that he is still alive having cut off the infected body that Dr. Hell corrupted during the reconstruction of his damaged hand. It was revealed that Dr. Hell implanted a Kedora in his hand that controlled his mind. He later reveals to Tsubasa that the Mycenae empire would come if Kouji defeats Dr. Hell.

=== Photon Power Laboratory ===
- Sayaka Yumi (弓 さやか, Yumi Sayaka; played by Yōko Honda): The daughter of Professor Yumi. She pilots Aphrodite A, a female robot and later the much improved Venus A.
- Genosuke Yumi (弓 弥之助, Yumi Yanosuke; played by Hiroshi Naka): Sayaka's father, a renowned professor of mechanics, and head of the Photon Power Labs. His name in all previous Mazinger series was read as "Gennosuke", but in the second episode of this series he was called "Yanosuke".
- Boss (ボス, Bosu; played by Kenichiro Matsuge): Renowned leader of all the high-school delinquents in Japan. He comes to Atami because it is the only area in Japan without a gang leader.
- Nuke (ヌケ; played by Kiyohito Yoshikai) and Mucha (ムチャ; played by Hideki Nakanishi): The two members of Boss's gang. They are skilled in minor combat techniques as shown in Episode 12.
- The Three Doctors (三博士, San Hakase): Sewashi (せわし; played by Kiyohito Yoshikai), Morimori (もりもり; played by Hideki Nakanishi) and Nossori (のっそり; played by Hiroaki Ishikawa), three professors who are colleagues of Prof. Yumi and close friends of Dr. Juzo. In the original series, they helped build the Diana A and Boss Borot. In Shin Mazinger, they were the designers of the robots for the Mazinger Army and as such serve as the superiors to the group. They also worked under Tsubasa and designed the first Jet Scrander for Mazinger Z to use for aerial combat. They show having a liking to Kikunosuke of the Kurogane Five.
- Loru (ロール, Rōru; played by Mayuki Makiguchi) & Lori (ローリィ, Rōrī; played by Yukiko Monden): Female twins who are pilots of Million α (Alpha) and later the improved version Shin Million α. The twins are supporting characters in Shin Mazinger as members of the Mazinger Army who are seen killed in battle in the pilot episode. In the Mazinkaiser OVA series, the twins first appear as assistants to Prof. Yumi and the objects of affection by Koji, Shiro and Boss due to their bustier physiques, much to the annoyance of Sayaka. They survived the final battle after following the plan of Tsubasa and lead the Million Corps against Dr. Hell. They were defeated by the King of Hell but the twins survived in Episode 26.
- Shun Azuma (東 しゅん, Azuma Shun; played by Yoshikazu Kazuma): Pilot of Baion β (Beta), and later Shin Baion β. He survived the final battle after following the plan of Tsubasa and lead the Baion Corps against Dr. Hell. The Baion Corps were defeated by the King of Hell but Shun survived in Episode 26.
- Masao Oide (大出 政雄, Ōide Masao; played by Masataka Sawada): Pilot of Daion γ (Gamma) and later Shin Daion γ. He survived the final battle after following the plan of Tsubasa and lead the Daion Corps against Dr. Hell. The Daion Corps were defeated by the King of Hell but Masao survived in Episode 26. Although defeated by the King of Hell in Episode 26, the 100 Rocket Punches were implanted in the bodies of the Million Corps, Baion Corps and Daion Corps which, Kouji successfully launched against the King of Hell.

=== Kurogane house ===
- Tsubasa Nishikiori (錦織 つばさ, Nishikiori Tsubasa; played by Miyuki Ichijo): Head Mistress of the Kurogane House, a spa in Atami. She and her staff have a mysterious connection with the Kabuto family as well as vast knowledge about Dr. Hell and the Mycenaeans. Tsubasa originally appears in Violence Jack. In later episodes, as the dark secrets of the Kabuto family was revealed, it was told that Tsubasa is the original assistant of Dr. Hell and a well skilled biochemist. She was revealed to be the mother of Kouji and Shiro and the wife of Kenzo Kabuto.
- The Kurogane Five (くろがね五人衆, Kurogane Goninshū): Staff members of the Kurogane House. They once lived violent lives (gangsters, assassins, etc.) until they met Tsubasa, who saved them from death (or near-death) as a result of their situations. Reborn, they swore unwavering loyalty to Tsubasa and vowed to serve and protect her, as well as the Kabuto family, with their lives. Each member is also equipped with a Super Alloy-Z weapon created by Tsubasa and Juzo. The Kurogane Five are loosely based on characters who appear in other works of Go Nagai, most notably Violence Jack and the Abashiri Family. The members of the Kurogane Five are:
  - Cross (クロス, Kurosu; played by Tesshō Genda): Head clerk of the Kurogane House and Tsubasa's right-hand man. Cross provides vital information to Tsubasa regarding the incidents surrounding Atami. He is known to show incredible strength and resilience. His weapon is his own body, now made of Super Alloy-Z.
  - Django (ジャンゴ, Jango; played by Yutaka Aoyama): Described by Inspector Ankokuji as a "weird Mexican looking guy" (thanks to his appearance of wearing a poncho), Django's role is to bring tourists to the Kurogane House on the outskirts of Atami, as well as recruiting new members to the staff. He is an expert marksman, having an array of guns, rifles, and special ammunitions, and shooting down his targets with pinpoint accuracy. When opposing more powerful opponents, he unleashes his Super Alloy-Z bullets.
  - Sensei (先生): Head chef of the Kurogane House. Though he never speaks, his cooking skills are said to be the best in the world. He is a master swordsman who has shown extraordinary skills with a blade by slicing a fish into sashimi pieces in a moment and then letting the fish swim in the water still alive despite having its head and bones remaining. In battle, he fights using a Super Alloy-Z sword.
  - Yasu the Weasel (イタチの安, Itachino Yasu; played by Masayuki Kato): Working as the House's bath attendant, he is an expert in the use of bombs and grenades. If need be, Yasu can blow himself up using the photon power bomb planted in a Super Alloy-Z chamber in his own body to protect Tsubasa and the Kabutos.
  - Kikunosuke (菊ノ助; played by Seiko Tomoe): The Head Waitress of the Kurogane House. Also called "Sister Kiku" by the staff and even Tsubasa herself. Despite her small stature and old age, she is the most feared member of all the Kurogane staff. In battle, she moves at superhuman speed that surpasses even Sensei's and fights with a thin Super Alloy-Z thread used to bond and/or slice apart her opponents. Her character and choice of weapon is loosely based on the characters from the Abashiri Family.

=== Bardos Island ===
- Dr. Hell (Dr.ヘル, Dokutoru Heru; played by Kazuhiko Kishino): Koji's archnemesis. He, along with Juzo Kabuto, discovered Bardos Island, home of the ancient Mycenaeans. Uncovering the Mechanical Beasts, Dr. Hell uses the technology of the Mycenaeans to build his army of giant robots in a campaign for world domination. He seeks the technology being developed at the Photon Power Lab (and more importantly the Japanium ore) to make his armies truly unstoppable. Described by Juzo as a genius biochemist, he is even able to revive the dead.
- Baron Ashura (あしゅら男爵, Ashura Danshaku; played by Koya Ishitobi (male) and Kaori Yamagata (female)): Dr. Hell's right hand, Baron Ashura is a half-man, half-woman combination. He/she commands the undersea fortress Saluud and the Ashura Corps, one of the divisions of Dr. Hell's army. A number of episodes are dedicated to revealing Ashura's story (including the events of his/her rebirth and the lives his/her previous halves lived prior to their combination).
- Count Brocken (ブロッケン伯爵, Burokken Hakushaku; played by Minoru Inaba): Another loyal servant of Dr. Hell. Brocken is a German cyborg whose head is completely separated from his body. He commands the Ghoul and the Air Division of Dr. Hell's army. Compared to Pygman and Ashura, he is occasionally comic relief (e.g. in one episode his head is taken by Koji and Boss's group and kicked around like a football).
- Viscount Pygman (ピグマン子爵, Piguman Shishaku; played by Kenichi Mochizuki): Third servant of Dr. Hell, a pygmy warrior with a series of bizarre physical abilities. He takes the form of Jim Mazinger, a character from Violence Jack. Pygman has high regards towards Baron Ashura, and shows his support in Episode 8 when he rescued Ashura from the team of Koji and Tsubasa, and again in Episode 9 as Ashura was punished by Dr. Hell for failing to defeat Mazinger Z numerous times. Unlike his comrades, Pygman does not lead any Mechanical Beasts. Instead, he relies on his mystic powers and physical abilities to advance Dr. Hell's schemes.
- Gamia Q (ガミアQ, Gamia Kyū; played by Satsuki Yukino): A series of Gynoids serving under Baron Ashura, who regards them as his/her 'daughters'. They were created for the sole purpose of assassinating Koji Kabuto and Tsubasa Nishikiori. Most of them were destroyed during an attack on the Kurogane house and another was defeated by Koji when he, Sayaka and Boss escaped the Saluud. A fairly intact Gamia (called Gamia Q3) was recovered and repaired, eventually fighting alongside Detective Ankokuji (who refers to her as 'My Honey').

=== Mycenae ===
- Zeus (ゼウス, Zeusu; played by Masaki Yajima): The legendary Greek God. In Shin Mazinger, he is revealed to be a commanding officer of an extraterrestrial army using the Earth as a strategic point in battle against an unknown enemy. He is said to be the cause of the fall of the Mycenaean Civilization when he defied the order of his superior, Uranus, and battled his own men to defend the Mycenaean people. He is also called "Z Mazinger", a name Juzo later used as the inspiration for the creation and naming of his robot, Mazinger Z. He is based on the character Zeus, who appears in the Z Mazinger manga. Zeus's appearance is used as a metaphor to describe Mazinger Z as a god if used to save the Earth. Zeus is also revealed to be one of the three gods that commands Mycenae, the other two being his rival, Hades, and Poseidon.
- Kedora (ケドラ): A Mycenaean soldier in the form of an alien creature. In the pilot, Kedora describes itself as a being made to destroy other civilizations and manages to take control of Mazinger Z. Kedora first appeared in a Mazinger Z short story by the late Ken Ishikawa.
- Archduke Gorgon (ゴーゴン大公, Gōgon Taikō; played by Kiyoyuki Yanada): In the original series, he leads the Mycenaeans against both Mazinger Z and Great Mazinger. In Shin Mazinger, Gorgon was a subordinate of Zeus who betrays him by offering the body of Tristran (in reality, Baron Ashura) in a manner similar to the Trojan Horse. This caused Zeus to lower his guard to be attacked by Hades.
- Tristan (トリスタン, Torisutan; played by Kaori Yamagata) and Isolde (イゾルデ, Izorude; played by Koya Ishitobi): The previous lives of the Baron Ashura. The names are probably inspired in the romantic narrative Tristan and Isolde.
- Hades (ハーデス, Hādesu; played by Kenji Utsumi): One of the three gods of the Mycenae along with Zeus. He's the ruler of Hell and originally appears in the Z Mazinger manga. Hades attempted to eliminate Zeus after the latter lowers his guard from Archduke Gorgon's offering of the body of Tristan (in truth, it was the body of Baron Ashura), but was defeated when Zeus fights back along with assistance from Koji and his Mazinger Z.
- The Emperor of Darkness (闇の帝王, Yami no Teiō): A being of flame, he immediately appears after Hades was defeated by Zeus and Mazinger Z, sinking Bardos Island into the sea. He originally appears in Great Mazinger as the true leader of the Mycenaean Empire.

=== Other characters ===
- Detective Ankokuji (暗黒寺刑事, Ankokuji Keiji; played by Atsushi Imaruoka): A detective who serves to investigate the Kabuto family and later is given orders to protect them. He also serves as a comic relief to the series, having originally appeared in the original 1970s Mazinger Z manga. Unlike the original manga, Ankokuji plays a significantly larger role in the anime. In the first episodes (which occurs in medias res) he is shown to be partnered with the assassin Gynoid Gamia Q3, who he calls his "honey". His given name is Yamitaro.
- Lorelei Heinrich (ローレライ・ハインリッヒ, Rōrerai Hainrihhi; played by Saki Fujita): Dr. Heinrich's daughter and Shiro's love interest. She is a Gynoid who can fuse with Schtroheim's other creation, the giant robot Danube α1 (Alpha 1), and battles Mazinger Z in order to fulfill her father's dream of surpassing Juzo's creation to become the greatest robot engineer of all. Her story and name seem to be inspired in the German poem Die Lorelei by Heinrich Heine.
- Schtroheim Heinrich (シュトロハイム・ハインリッヒ, Shutorohaimu Hainrihhi; played by Iemasa Kayumi): A cyborg and former collaborator of Doctor Hell, he is shown with his Gynoid daughter Lorelei while talking to Tsubasa Nishikiori in the first episode. Schtroheim is one of the three great robot engineers in all of Japan (the other two being Juzo Kabuto and his son, Kenzo). Like Tsubasa, Heinrich too has knowledge about the legend of the Mycenaeans. In both Shin Mazinger and in the original series, Schtroheim is a direct rival of Juzo and is determined to surpass the creator of Mazinger Z by any means.
- Tetsuya Tsurugi (剣 鉄也, Tsurugi Tetsuya; played by Fumihiro Awano): Previously known only as "Blade", he's a shadowy figure who appears in the first episode killing Viscount Pygman. He is the pilot of Energer Z and is believed to be also the pilot of Great Mazinger, as the silhouette of the said robot appeared behind him in the background in the first episode. In this series, he is an ace robot pilot who assisted the Kabutos, Dr. Hell, and Nishikori in exploring Bardos Island, and battled Dr. Hell when he made his first bid for World Domination. After his apparent death, Tsubasa learns that he is her lost brother.
- Great General of Darkness (闇黒大将軍, Ankoku Daishōgun): General of the Mycenaean Army. He appears in front of a stunned Koji Kabuto at the very opening of the series. In the original Mazinger Z series, he defeated Mazinger Z in battle as his own army is superior to Dr. Hell's, but was defeated later by Great Mazinger. Great General of Darkness also appears in Mazinkaiser as the main antagonist after the fall of Dr. Hell. His role in the series is not yet fully known. As shown in Episode 2, the damaged Mazinger Z lumbers away from the Great General of Darkness giving a clue to the next Mazinger and Great Mazinger series.
- Demon Lord Dante (魔王ダンテ, Maō Dante): The demon from the series of the same name. Though not directly involved in the story, Demon Lord Dante's form emerges enveloping Mazinger Z when it is controlled by a Kedora, emphasizing the metaphor of Mazinger Z becoming a devil when used to destroy because of its power.

== Anime versions ==
Along with the TV Tokyo broadcast, a web stream that uses the mms protocol is available in the Bandai Channel exclusively for Japanese users. The version available here, as with other anime, includes extended scenes not seen in the TV broadcast. The Bandai Channel logo of the series does not have the "on television" legend that the TV Tokyo logo has. After episode 15, the contents of both version are the same, with no extra scenes in the Bandai Channel version.

== Episodes ==
No.	Title	Original release date
1	"Grand Finale" "Dai-danen" (大団円)	April 4, 2009
The first episode begins in medias res, depicting the climatic final battle between the Photon Power Lab and Dr. Hell's forces. Meeting the attack head on are the Mazinger Corps and the Kurogane house, who attempt to stand their ground against Dr. Hell's three armies, led by Baron Ashura, Count Brocken and Viscount Pygman. As the battle is being waged we find out that the protagonist Kouji has been missing, and is shown to be in an unknown location, for unknown reasons. While there he meets a variety of strange beings including Zeus. By the time he returns, Dr. Hell's forces have already defeated most of his comrades and Kouji prepares to defeat Dr. Hell, for their sake.
2	"Activation! Mazinger!" "Shidō! Majingā!" (始動!マジンガー!)	April 11, 2009
The beginning shows a wrecked Mazinger Z slumbering away from the Dark General. This will be the continuation of Episode 26, where the Dark General comes and Mazinger Z uses the Big Bang Punch to ram the Dark General. The story moves back to the very start of the events which led to the previous episode. Kouji and his brother, Shiro, are living with their grandfather, Juzo, while mysterious murders occur around their manor. Investigating these murders is Inspector Ankokuji, who was also hired to be Juzo's bodyguard, while Dr. Hell and Baron Ashura prepare for their first attack on the Photon Power Lab. In the meantime, Boss and his gang kidnap Shiro in order to lure out Kouji and beat him. After Kouji fights Boss, Baron Ashura attacks his household with the gigantic robot known as "Talos", forcing Juzo to send out the Pilder to Kouji and Shiro. Moments later, Juzo activates the product of years of research: the Super Robot, Mazinger Z.
3	"Sortie! Ashura Corps!" "Shutsugeki! Ashura Gundan" (出撃!あしゅら軍団!)	April 18, 2009
Kouji gradually learns to how to control Mazinger Z, while Baron Ashura quakes in fear and rage at the robot who he/she believes to be Zeus (a being who "betrayed" his/her race, the Myceneans, thousands of years ago). After destroying Ashura's Talos with a devastating Rocket Punch, Baron Ashura vows to take revenge against "Zeus" by sending out two of its most powerful robots: Garada K7 and Doublas M2.
4	"Fierce Battle! Mechanical Beasts vs. Mazinger" "Gekisen! Kikaijū VS Majingā" (激戦!機械獣VSマジンガー)	April 25, 2009
Kouji faces off against Garada K7, still struggling to use the controls. Meanwhile, Detective Ankokuji and Juuzou both attempt to flee from Ashura's troops, all while Juuzou suffers from a serious injury. As Kouji begins to move his fight with Garada K7 into the town of Atami, he manages to knock the mechanical beast into a building, only to see a horrific site: The blood of individuals who were crushed under the rubble. Traumatized and afraid of causing more casualties, Kouji attempts to fire a Rocket Punch, only for it to be deflected. Meanwhile, as Juuzou and Ankokuji are surrounded by Ashura's troops, Juuzou manages to enter a shrine (where Boss and his lackeys are hiding) in order to activate a remote control system, sending the giant fist out to catch both he and Ankokuji, returning them to Kouji and Shiro in Mazinger Z's cockpit.
5	"Assault! Count Brocken" "Kyōshū! Burokken Hakushaku" (強襲!ブロッケン伯爵)	May 2, 2009
As the battle with Garada K7 continues, Juuzou shows Kouji how to use the devastating "Rust Hurricane" attack, destroying Garada K7 instantly. Ashura then sends out Doubla M2, who begins to use Photon Energy attacks upon Mazinger Z. The attacks fail, however, as Mazinger Z is revealed to have been made from Super Alloy Z, allowing him to absorb the blast. Juuzou then teaches Kouji one last attack: The deadly "Breast Fire" technique, destroying Doublas with a blast of energy. Kouji, Shiro, and Ankokuji's rejoicing is short lived, however, as Juuzou dies moments afterwards. Infuriated, Kouji chases down Ashura in the Mazinger, grabbing him and nearly crushing him, before Sayaka and her comrades arrive to try to calm Kouji down. Ashura then escapes Mazinger's grasp, causing Kouji to let loose another Breast Fire attack, which Sayaka blocks using Aphrodai A. As Sayaka, and her father, Prof. Yumi, help Kouji to calm down, the plane carrying Prof. Yumi is destroyed by a new enemy: The headless Count Brocken, who deploys the bomber-robot Groizer X-10 to destroy Mazinger, and the rest of Atami. As the Mazinger Corps. fail to hold off Groizer's descent, Kouji and the others are faced with no escape. Suddenly, Tsubasa Nishikiori walks out towards Mazinger Z, telling Kouji that there is one weapon which he can still use: The Photon Beam.
6	"Fire! Photon Beam!!" "Hassha! Kōshiryoku Bīmu!!" (発射!光子力ビーム!!)	May 9, 2009
Starting out approximately one day after the events of the previous battle, Kouji has been taken into custody by Ankokuji, while Shiro remains at the police station, as Ankokuji argues with Kouji about just how responsible he was for Atami's destruction. Meanwhile, Sayaka and the Mazinger Corp. have returned to the Photon Research Facility, and consider the sheer power of Mazinger Z, reflecting on Kouji's outburst the night before. Dr. Hell, Count Brocken, and Baron Ashura also reflect upon their previous defeat while on board the Flying Fortress, Ghoul. Later, Prof. Yumi tells Sayaka of his early work with Dr. Kabuto: Their discovery of Japanium, Juuzou's sudden disappearance, and the fact that he, in truth, chose to perform the Photon Energy tests in Atami in order to lure Dr. Kabuto out, so that they could complete their research together. Amidst these discussions, the story flashes back to the night before, continuing from the end of the previous episode, as Nishikiori tells Kouji to fire the Photon Beam. As Brocken's Groizer X-10 approaches, it begins to drop bombs on Atami, while Nishikiori instructs Kouji on how to operate the beam. With only moments before impact, Kouji charges the beam to its maximum capacity, and fires at Groizer, propelling it back into the air, and destroying it completely. Returning to the day afterwards, Sayaka and her father visit the Shirogane house, where Nishikiori explains her connection to Dr. Kabuto. Moments later, however, police officers sent by Ankokuji arrive, with a search warrant to look for the missing Pilder (which had vanished after the battle the night before). At the same time, Ankokuji demands that Kouji tell him where he hid the Pilder, while Kouji insists that he does not know. Meanwhile, Dr. Hell has a startling revelation involving his connection to Nishikiori.
7	"Legend! The Mechanical Beasts of Bardos!" "Densetsu! Bādosu Tō no Kikaijū!" (伝説!バードス島の機械獣!)	May 16, 2009
As Ankokuji's search for the Pilder continues, Kouji continues to insist that he does not know the whereabouts of the craft. Despite this, Ankokuji plans to interrogate Shiro in front of Kouji, in order to force an answer out of him. Around this time, Shiro, who had been sleeping in the Police Department, wakes up to find the bodies of numerous officers. As a pair of officers slowly approach the office to fetch Shiro, he overhears their plan, and is forced to hide, causing Ankokuji to send even more officers out to search for him. In the midst of all of this, Prof. Yumi and Sayaka become suspicious of Ankokuji's entire operation, noticing that the number of officers out searching for the Pilder far exceed those that would normally be present in Atami, and dispatches Sayaka in Aphrodai A. Shiro finds Kouji locked in his cell, before Ankokuji comes to attack them; as he lunges towards Shiro, Kouji grabs the detective's face, causing his "skin" to tear off. Meanwhile, group of officers at the Shirogane House make a shocking discovery: the REAL Detective Ankokuji has been sleeping at the Inn during this whole search, and the impostor who led this search is none other than Baron Ashura, with all of the "officers" being the Ashura Corps. Sayaka is stopped by another one of Ashura's machine beasts, Nonakargo H2, which quickly defeats Aphrodai A. Ashura manages to corner Shiro on the roof, but is thwarted by Nishikiori, who electrocutes it, while two of her subordinates, Yasu and Cross, break Kouji out of his cell. Seeing Ashura, Kouji grabs a soldiers sword and heads to the rooftop in order to avenge his grandfather. Meanwhile, Dr. Hell reveals his connection with Nishikiori to Count Brocken: she was previously his assistant, and the two of them had met with Prof. Kabuto and Prof. Yumi ten years earlier to find the legendary warriors of the island of Bardos. Multiple archeological digs took place throughout the Aegean Sea, but to no success. Eventually, however, the remnants of the island of Bardos were found under the sea by Kabuto and Hell, where the Mechanical Beasts lay dormant. Determined to use these beasts to rule the world, Dr. Hell was suddenly betrayed by Nishikiori, who blew the island up. Moreover, Hell reveals that Nishikiori is none other than the "creator" of Baron Ashura. Meanwhile, as Nishikiori prepares to deal the final blow on her creation, Kouji charges in, determined to kill it himself; this act, however, proves to be a mistake, as Ashura regains its strength and summons the Nonakargo to attack them.
8	"Birth! Baron Ashura!" "Tanjō! Ashura Danshaku!" (誕生!あしゅら男爵!)	May 23, 2009
Having summoned Nonakargo in the previous episode, Baron Ashura reveals its true ability – the machine can open up its torso and capture other machines with an electromagnetic net. Currently locked inside is Aphrodai A, the result of their confrontation in episode 7. As Ashura escapes and orders Nonakargo to capture Mazinger Z, Tsubasa tells Yasu to send out "the signal" in the form of a firework. This signal turns out to be the command to summon the Pilder, which was actually hidden underneath the Kurogane house, sending it (and Ankokuji, who fell on top) flying towards Kouji's location. Meanwhile, Boss and his cohorts who were originally planning to steal Mazinger Z decide to flee, since Nonakargo is approaching them. However, they're stopped by a strange new character in a sombrero, who is revealed to be another member of the Kurogane House – the sharpshooter Django. Django forces Boss and his group to help him fight the approaching Nonakargo on foot, by entrenching themselves in Mazinger Z's head and firing on it with a large rifle. The rifle turns out to fire special ice rounds, which freeze Nonakargo in place. Having bought themselves some time, Tsubasa and Kouji pursue Baron Ashura in the Pilder. It is then that Baron Ashura's origins were revealed – during the excavation of Bardos Island, Juzo and Dr. Hell discovered two lovers preserved within a cocoon, who Dr. Hell suggests should be revived from the dead to tell them the secrets of Bardos Island. Juzo points out that since half of the lover's bodies were decayed, they'd be impossible to revive – to which Dr. Hell suggests they be reborn as the same person. With his assistant Tsubasa's help, they successfully sew together the two lovers and bring them to life. Unfortunately, Ashura is immediately hostile to everyone in the room. To prevent this in the future, Tsubasa performs another surgery that will shock Ashura should he/she try to attack her or Dr. Hell – this is the source of her powers in the previous episode. Back in the present, Tsubasa catches up with Baron Ashura and tries to kill him/her with a missile, but is intercepted by the sudden arrival of Viscount Pygman, who is also subject to the same control as Ashura. He gets around this however by stabbing out his eyes, preventing him from "recognizing" Tsubasa. After blasting them with the missile, he flies off carrying Ashura and frees Nonakargo. With them out of the way, Kouji docks with Mazinger Z and attacks Nonakargo. After Aphrodite A frees herself from its electromagnetic net, he destroys it with a Breast Fire. The day then ends.
9	"Activate! Japan Raid Operation!" "Hatsudō! Nippon Shinryaku Sakusen!" (発動!日本侵略作戦!)	May 30, 2009
After a short time skip, Kouji and Shiro now live at the Kurogane House and work alongside the Photon Power Lab in the fight against the mechanical beasts. However, friction has been born between Kouji and the Robot Corps, who he finds useless and has no desire to fight beside. Meanwhile Baron Ashura, eager to prove him/herself to Dr. Hell, begins a co-ordinated mechanical beast attack on Tokyo, Osaka and Nagoya. At the same time, three mysterious blonde women arrive at the Kurogane House.
10	"Iron Wall! The Kurogane 5!" "Teppeki! Kurogane Go-Ninshū!" (鉄壁!くろがね五人衆!)	June 6, 2009
Baron Ashura's mechanical beasts continue to wreak havoc in Tokyo, Osaka and Nagoya, forcing the Robot Corps sortie to defeat them. However, their machines prove to be ineffective at fighting the mechanical beasts. Kouji remains at the Kurogane House, knowing that if he left to help them then the Photon Power Labs would be left open to attack. While he waits, three assassin androids – the Gamia Sisters – arrive at the Kurogane House to kill Kouji. But before they can complete their mission, they are stopped by the Kurogane Five who are revealed to have special abilities and weapons. Cross is a cyborg made from Super Alloy Z, Sensei has a Super Alloy Z katana, Yasu's body contains a Photon Power Bomb, Kikunosuke can move at super speeds and had Super Alloy Z razor wire, and Django has special Super Alloy Z bullets. While they are fighting the Gamia sisters, Kouji steals the Pilder and prepares to dock with Mazinger Z – determined to defeat the attacking mechanical beasts.
11	"Pincer Movement! Mechanical Beasts Big Strategy!" "Kyōgeki! Kikaijū Daisakusen!" (挟撃!機械獣大作戦!)	June 13, 2009
Kouji arrives at the Photon Power Lab with the Pilder and attempts to combine with Mazinger Z. However, Baron Ashura attacks with Belgas V5 and steals Mazinger Z, forcing Kouji to chase after it and free Mazinger before he can use the machine. As Kouji fights mechanical beast after mechanical beast, Tsubasa and the Kurogane Five arrive at the Photon Power Labs carrying the corpse of Gamia Q3. They speak with the scientists and seem to agree on who could have made the androids. They then go on to discuss various other upcoming technologies such as the Jet Scrander – a flight module for Mazinger, and the Mazinger Army – an upgraded version of the Robot Corps. Meanwhile, Kouji has defeated several mechanical beasts – Belgas V5, Glossam X2, Ghostfire V9 and Taurus D7. The last remaining mechanical beast is KingDan X10, but before Kouji can defeat it the beast opens up to reveal Sayaka chained to its insides. Unable to fight back without killing Sayaka, Kouji is forced to enter Ashura's Undersea Fortress Saluud and surrender Mazinger Z.
12	"Escape! Undersea Fortress Saluud!" "Dasshutsu! Kaitei Yōsai Sarūdo!" (脱出!海底要塞サルード!)	June 20, 2009
Having surrendered Mazinger Z to Baron Ashura, Kouji is handcuffed and locked in a cell in Undersea Fortress Saluud. Boss, Nuke and Mucha on the other hand, managed to avoid detection by hiding in the Pilder. They break out, defeat several guards and then disguise themselves using their uniform to rescue Kouji and Sayaka. After freeing Kouji however, the Saluud comes under attack from Count Brocken and begins to sink. Eventually, Boss and Kouji rescue Sayaka and make it back to the Pilder and Mazinger. Before they can get there though, they are confronted by the fifth and final Gamia sister who is defeated by the joint efforts of Kouji and Sayaka. The group then get in Mazinger Z and prepare to escape, but not before Baron Ashura reveals that he had set the fortress to self-destruct. To make matters worse, when Mazinger Z escapes the fortress it becomes stuck in the soft ocean floor. Before it is caught in the explosion, the Robot Corps arrive carrying the complete Jet Scrander and Mazinger uses it to escape from ocean and into the sky. Back at the Kurogane House, Kouji admits he was wrong to mistreat his allies and resolves his dispute with the Robot Corps.
13	"First love? Beautiful Girl Lorelei!" "Hatsukoi? Bishōjo Rōrerai!" (初恋?美少女ローレライ!)	June 27, 2009
In order to confirm the nature of the Gamia sisters, Tsubasa and Cross travel to Germany to meet a scientist named Heinrich Schtroheim. Back in Atami, Shiro falls in love with a mysterious young girl named Lorelei, who stops by the Kurogane house looking for Tsubasa who had already left. As the two begin to develop a strong friendship, Kouji learns the truth of Lorelei's background, only to find that she and Shiro have traveled to Germany in order to visit Lorelei's father. As Kouji and Ankokuji fly to Europe to follow them, they fall prey to a surprise attack by Dr. Hell's forces, while Shiro meets Lorelei's father: The monstrous Heinrich Schtroheim, who then, to Shiro's disbelief, introduces him to his real mother: Tsubasa.
14	"Shame! Kabuto Family's Grave Sin Exposed!" "Zanki! Abakuru Kabuto-ke no Daizai!" (慙愧!暴かれる兜家の大罪!)	July 4, 2009
With Shiro and Tsubasa together in one place, Schtroheim begins to reveal details of the Kabuto family's twisted past – that he and Tsubasa were once engaged, that she eloped with Kouji and Shiro's father Kenzo Kabuto and that before the end of the expedition, she killed Kenzo with her own hands. Their conversation is cut short by the arrival of Baron Ashura, who demands to take Schtroheim's creation – the giant robot Danube α1. Ashura reveals that Schtroheim had agreed to complete the machine for Dr. Hell, as repayment for bringing him back to life after an accident that killed him. However, Schtroheim insists that the machine is not complete and chases Ashura and his forces out of his house. With Ashura gone, Schtroheim and Tsubasa have a cryptic conversation about Mycanae and the Kabuto family but are interrupted by the arrival of the once thought dead Kenzo Kabuto.
15	"Confrontation! The Sorrowful Blue Danube!" "Taiketsu! Kanashimi no Aoki Donau!" (対決!悲しみの青きドナウ!)	July 11, 2009
As Kenzo, appearing via a hologram, greets Stroheim and Tsubasa, the pair soon learn that the Gamia robots were of Kenzo's design. Just as he disappears, the Ashura Corps storm Stroheim's castle, demanding to meet Dr. Schtroheim. Meanwhile, Ankokuji, who has snuck in to the Ashura Corps., manages to find and rescue Shiro, before heading out to reactivate Gamia. As Shiro meets up with Lorelei, Baron Ashura manages to hijack the Danube, planning to bring it back to Dr. Hell, just as Kouji and Cross arrive at the Castle. At the same time, Ankokuji watches as the Gamia seems to surge back to life, only for it to tell him to leave, before the area around it begins to surge with energy. Schtroheim then attempts to stop Ashura, trying to knock it out of the cockpit, only to be hit with a blast of energy by Ashura, and sent plummeting to his death. As Shiro, Lorelei and Tsubasa run to Schtroheim's aid, he reveals the truth: Lorelei is the true "heart" of the Danube α1, and she was incomplete due to a lack of any idea of sadness. Although Schtroheim planned to use Shiro for this, he realizes his own death will work. With his dying breaths, Schtroheim orders Lorelei to defeat Mazinger Z, and shows her how to combine with the Danube. Despite Shiro's pleas to rethink things, Lorelei ignores him and merges with the Danube, defeating Ashura's robot, as Ashura is impaled by debris and then facing off against Kouji and Mazinger Z. As a fierce fight wages on, Lorelei thanks Shiro for his friendship, despite the fact that she will still attempt to defeat Mazinger, before she is destroyed, much to Shiro's dismay.
16	"Exhumation! Battle Brain Kedora!" "Hakkutsu! Sentō Zunō Kedora!" (発掘!戦闘頭脳ケドラ!)	July 18, 2009
As Kouji continues to fight off Machine Beasts, Dr. Hell sends him a "surprise" in the form of the mechanical life form Kedora, an organism originally made for the Mycenaeans to control their Machine Beasts. As the Kedora takes control of Mazinger, Kouji attempts to stop the rampaging machine and destroy the Kedora itself. After getting help from Nishikiori, Kouji forces the Kedora out of Mazinger, and manages to destroy. Meanwhile, Dr. Hell, Baron Ashura and Viscount Pygman are met by the mysterious Archduke Gorgon.
17	"Joint struggle! Travel to the Dangerous Past!" "Kyōtō! Kiken na Kako e no Tabi!" (共闘!危険な過去への旅!)	July 25, 2009
Dr. Hell tried to stop Archduke Gorgon from regaining control of Bardos island. He orders his Thalos giants to subdue Archduke Gorgon. To his surprise, the Thalos giants only follow Archduke Gorgon. Archduke Gorgon was defeated by multiple Count Brocken bodies. Kouji, Tsubasa and Baron Ashura enters the Mycenae pillar to follow the escaped Kedora. Inside, they were translated in the past where Archduke Gorgon, Tristan and Isolde was planning a rebellion against Zeus. Zeus overhears them and warns them. Cross, Django, Sensei and Yasu joins to protect Tsubasa. Kouji learns the history of Zeus. Unfortunately, the group was discovered when Baron Ashura was overwhelmed seeing Tristan and Isolde again in the past. This episode features a time travel where the present meets the past.
18	"Disappearance! Mycenae's Last Day!" "Shōmetsu! Mikene no Saigo hi!" (消滅!ミケーネの最後日!)	August 1, 2009
Baron Ashura, Tsubasa, Kouji and the Kurogane four try to flee but was stopped by the mechanical beast Garadoubla. Baron Ashura was caught and held captive. Cross sacrifices his life by saving Tsubasa and Kouji from being smashed by Garadoubla. Yasu then sacrificed himself by blowing the atomic bomb planted in his stomach destroying Garadoubla. Kouji, Tsubasa and Sensei escaped using the Hover Pilder. Tristan and Isolde, serving as priests of the mechanical beasts agrees with Archduke Gorgon's plan to preserve the Mycenae empire if their plan of subversing Zeus fail. The two went into the hybenation stage inside a cocoon. Meanwhile, Archduke Gorgon tries to please Zeus by sacrificing Baron Ashura, telling Zeus that it is Tristan covering Isolde's half face. Zeus is convinced and agrees to remove his golden protective armor. Archduke Gorgon summons Hades and Hades severes Zeus arm. Kouji saves Baron Ashura from being sacrificed in fire. Hades tries to kill Zeus by his fire power. Django and Sensei died trying to kill Archduke Gorgon. Kouji tried to help Zeus but was stopped again by Garadoubla, who survived the atomic bomb by Yasu. Kouji activates Mazinger Z to finish off Garadoubla and eventually helped Zeus defeat Hades much to the delight of Zeus. Zeus finishes off Hades by throwing his severed hand as his version of Rocket Punch destroying Hades. Hades re-appears as a ghastly fire form and vows to come back with his seven generals as the Emperor of Darkness. Meanwhile, Baron Ashura agrees with Tsubasa to open the Mycenea gate to destroy the escaped Kedora. By destroying the last Kedora, Baron Ashura have proven their loyalty to Dr. Hell. However, more memories will be revealed to Ashura, Tsubasa and Kouji involving Dr. Hell and Kenzo Kabuto...
19	"Grudge! Kurogane House's Longest Day (First Part)" "Ikon! Kurogane ya no Ichiban Nagai hi (Zenpen)" (遺恨!くろがね屋の一番長い日(前編))	August 8, 2009
Kouji and Tsubasa returned to Kurogane house. Tsubasa became sick after the battle with the last Kedora and appeared to be hallucinated and acting strange. This is done by Pygman's voodoo powers. She saw first the ghost of her brother Tetsuya who appears to have a grudge with Kenzo Kabuto. Back at Bardos island, Dr. Hell vows revenge to Nishikiori Tsubasa. Baron Ashura had escaped from Bardos island after realizing she was tricked and betrayed the Mycenae empire. Count Brocken with the help of Pygman devised a plan to trick Tsubasa and the rest into revealing the whereabouts of the Japanium ore, the source of Photon energy. Baron Ashura was spotted and fell off a cliff. Pygman disguises himself as Baron Ashura. Kouji immediately came into the rescue of Baron Ashura by catching them using the Hover Pilder. Baron Ashura was brought into Kurogane house to hide. Meanwhile, Tsubasa continued to have hallucinations about the past and Kenzo Kabuto. It is learned that Energer Z, piloted by Tetsuya Tsurugi was the first prototype robot made by Kenzo Kabuto to harness photon energy. Tsubasa then tried to talk to the strange figure of Tetsuya who appeared and stayed in Kurogane house. She was hoping that Tetsuya will reveal why he suddenly appeared to her. Strangely, it seems only Tsubasa can see Tetsuya. Energer Z appeared with Kenzo Kabuto piloting, much to the shock of Tsubasa...
20	"Grudge! Kurogane House's Longest Day (Second Part)" "Ikon! Kurogane ya no Ichiban Nagai hi (Chūhen)" (遺恨!くろがね屋の一番長い日(中編))	August 15, 2009
Energer Z appeared with Kenzo Kabuto as pilot. Pygman who appears in a hologram implies that Energer Z is looking for Zeus arm, the source of photon energy. Tsubasa appears and gets rid of Pygman's hologram and eventually his idea of handing over Zeus arm to Energer Z. Kouji activates Mazinger Z and fights off Energer Z. The two exchanges blows and fire power. Mazinger Z in the end was losing the battle and Baron Ashura convinces Tsubasa to reveal the whereabouts of Zeus arm in order to help Kouji. Memory came back to the sick Tsubasa when they have discovered Zeus arm as the source of photon energy. The same photon energy Juzo and Kenzo used to build Energer Z with Tetsuya Tsurugi as pilot. Dr. Hell revealed his true plans of world domination. Tetsuya used Energer Z to hide Zeus arm from Dr. Hell. Juzo hostages Dr. Hell but was attacked by Baron Ashura that blinded his one eye. Tsubasa appeared to help Juzo but Kenzo Kabuto appeared hostaging Juzo, his father. Tsubasa then saw a glimpse of the Kedora into Kenzo's artificial arm. Tetsuya came and subjugated Kenzo, who appears to have Kedora like tentacles. Tetsuya begs Tsubasa to kill both of them as he tells that this is a different Kenzo. Tsubasa opened fire apparently killing Tetsuya and Kenzo. Tsubasa tells Shiro the reason for killing Kenzo. However, Baron Ashura still persuades Tsubasa to reveal the whereabouts of Zeus arm and continued to re-tell the past. Tsubasa realized that it was not Baron Ashura but Pygman in disguise. Tsubasa figured out that how could Ashura knew what happened in the past while the Ashura in the past was unconscious. It could only be Pygman in disguise re-telling the story that he witnessed. Pygman got subdued and Tsubasa reveals that she would release Zeus arm by shouting "God Scrander!"
21	"Grudge! Kurogane House's Longest Day (Final Part)" "Ikon! Kurogane ya no Ichiban Nagai hi (Kōhen)" (遺恨!くろがね屋の一番長い日(後編))	August 22, 2009
Zeus arm appeared to the shocked Kouji. Meanwhile, the Kurogane four, Cross, Yasu, Django and Sensei along with Kiku appeared and captured Pygman. It was revealed that Tsubasa, as a biochemist had fixed them up again. Tsubasa explained that with the help of Tetsuya's ghost that she realized that Testuya was warning her of Pygman's plan to reveal the whereabouts of Zeus arm. Zeus arm captures Energer Z. Count Broken, masquerading as Kenzo Kabuto as pilot of Energer Z, escapes hoping that Energer Z will explode as both Energer Z and Zeus arm are photon energies. Meanwhile in Kurogane's house, Pygman escapes and tries to kill Tsubasa. Shiro shielded Tsubasa and acknowledged her as mother. Django fires at Pygman's spear with Shiro delivering the final blow. Pygman escapes into the rooftop. Count Brocken released his mechanical beasts to attack the Photon Power laboratory but was stopped by the new improved Mazinger Corps, Shin Million, Shin Daion and Shin Baion. A computer generated program Juzo left behind appears and tells Kouji his name is "Ultra Gorgeous Computer Grandpa!" Energer Z escaped from the grasp of Zeus arm and is ready to self-destruct. Zeus arm transforms into God Scrander where it integrated into Mazinger's body as wings. Mazinger Z then transformed into the Big Bang Punch and rammed Energer Z, destroying it. A repaired Gamia Q3 and Inspector Ankokuji returned. Later, Ankokuji explains that Kenzo rescued him in Germany and repaired Gamia Q3 and that Gamia Q3 will also protect Tsubasa. Tsubasa explains to Kouji, who apologizes to his mother for not knowing the past. Tetsuya Tsurugi was the long lost brother of Tsubasa. Tsubasa was then forced to take the life of Tetsuya and Kenzo at Tetsuya's request. Bardos island emerges to attack and the whole Kurogane house prepares to defend...
22	"Dreams! Ashura, the Sleeping Cocoon" "Mugen! Nemure ru Mayu no Ashura" (夢幻!眠れる繭のあしゅら)	August 29, 2009
Bardos island has started its attack. Meanwhile Archduke Gorgon came back again to confront Dr. Hell. Pygman arrives and Archduke Gorgon disappeared. It was revealed that the real Baron Ashura was captured. Memories came back again to Baron Ashura as being Tristan and Isolde serving as priests of Mycenae and how they betrayed Zeus.
23	"Approaching! Mechanical Beast Baron Ashura!" "Sekkin! Kikaijū Ashura-danshaku!" (接近!機械獣あしゅら男爵!)	September 5, 2009
Sayaka has a new robot called Venus A after Aphrodite A was destroyed along with the submarine Salude. The Mazinger Corps, Shin Million, Shin Baion, and Shin Daion was dispatched to confront the first wave of mechanical beasts. Inspector Ankokuji appears in the Photon labs and convinces Dr. Yumi to release the Photon energy. Back at the Kurogane house, Tsubasa explains the danger and the imminent return of Kenzo Kabuto. Dr. Hell appears as a hollogram to Kouji and Tsubasa and challenges Kouji into a one-on-one fight with Baron Ashura's new robot. The Mazinger Corps arrives and tried to stop Baron Ashura to no avail. Sayaka came with Venus A and used her Z cutters and cuts Baron Ashura's robot in half. Ashura's robot electrified Venus A and reminds Kouji to accept the challenge. Sayaka was rested into Kurogane's house and overhears Boss convincing Kouji to accept the challenge. She persuades Kouji not to accept the challenge. Kouji meets up with Tsubasa for a new plan. In the very next morning, we see Kouji taking Mazinger Z to face off Baron Ashura...
24	"Verge of Death! All-Out Attack Dr. Hell" "shisen! sōkōgeki dr. heru" (死線!総攻撃Dr.ヘル)	September 12, 2009
Dr. Hell launched his full attack. Count Brocken in his flying Ghoul and Pygman using the new submarine Bood. At the Kurogane house, the whole gang has prepared for the final assault. Django and Gamia Q3 were imprisoned by Sensei and Django as ordered by Tsubasa as they can't trust Kenzo Kabuto. Kouji arrives at the place where Dr. Hell and Baron Ashura had issued the one-on-one challenge. Much to his dismay, Baron Ashura was not there and several mechanical beasts are waiting to ambush Mazinger Z. It was revealed that Dr. Hell challenged Kouji to keep him busy so he would not interfere with his attack elsewhere. Pygman tries to take advantage and tried to kill Sayaka. Lori and Loru arrives to stop Pygman and rescue Sayaka. Pygman attacks the Photon laboratory using his control of animals. Meanwhile, Kouji is losing the battle with the mechanical beasts. Tsubasa activated several bombs in Atami destroying several robots of Baron Ashura. Baron Ashura activates a missile to destroy Atami but was intercepted by Boss Borot who released the missile into the atmosphere. Pygman tricks Dr. Yumi that Venus A was in trouble and needs to return into Photon labs immediately. Dr. Yumi deactivates the Photon Labs barrier giving Pygman the chance to attack the Photon Labs. Yumi decides to blow up Photon Labs. In the Kurogane house, Kenzo Kabuto appears before Tsubasa. Tsubasa then decides to kill him...
25	"Reversal! Bardos' Setting Sun!" "gyakuten! bādosu no rakujitsu!" (逆転!バードスの落日!)	September 19, 2009
The Mazinger Corps is defeated. God Scrander came and integrated with Mazinger Z to win against the mechanical beasts. Tsubasa was taken by Kenzo, who was revealed later to be a robot. Baron Ashura went to Kurogane house looking for Tsubasa and decided to burn Kurogane. Back to the Photon labs, Yumi survived the blast but was about to be killed when Sayaka returns with Venus A. Ankokuji and Gamia Q3 went to the rescue and shoots Pygman's body with a decomposing chemical. The chemical was the same chemical used by Dr. Hell to rot off Tristan and Isolde's half bodies. Pygman in his true form tried to escape but was killed by Blade, Tetsuya Tsurugi with a robot background, Great Mazinger. Blade disappeared and when asked why he suddenly disappeared, Ankokuji explains that that is another story, giving a hint to the next Great Mazinger series. Tsubasa arrives at the true Kenzo Kabuto. He has cut off his infected body with Kedora. It was revealed that Dr. Hell had implanted a Kedora in his hand when it was being reconstructed after being hit by the acid they used to rot-off Tristan and Isolde. The Kedora eventually corrupted the mind of Kenzo that resulted in his loyalty to Dr. Hell. In the meantime, Kouji decides to attack the flying Ghoul with Count Brocken to avenge the Mazinger Corps. Count Brocken activated his robot Brocken V2 Schneider but was destroyed with Mazinger's Breast of Fire. This resulted in the mechanical Ghoul crashing into the submarine Bood, seemingly destroying both Count Brocken and Baron Ashura. This crash also made Kouji unconscious at the bottom of the sea. Bardos island re-appears and Sayaka decides to confront it. To her surprise, Count Brocken survived and manages to capture Venus A. The Photon labs emerged as a Photon Power Fortress that fired photon beams on Count Brocken, destroying it. It was revealed that Tsubasa and Dr. Yumi has anticipated Dr. Hell's attack revealing the true form of Photon labs and to bring Bardos island from hiding. The Mazinger army appears again and attacks the Bardos island. Dr. Hell decides to raise his King of Hell robot...
26	"Conclusion! The Hundred Rocket Punch Barrage!" "ketchaku! roketto panchi hyaku renpatsu!" (決着!ロケットパンチ百連発!)	September 26, 2009
The beginning shows of Dr. Hell and Kenzo Kabuto arriving at the Mycenea hibernation place. Dr. Hell's King of Hell arises to defeat the numerous Mazinger army. The Mazinger army was defeated by Dr. Hell when the Million Squad and Venus A decides to use Photonic beam attack to Dr. Hell. Unknown to them, the King of Hell has a Photon absorber that will absorb all kinds of photon attacks thereby giving it more photon energy power. The Photon fortress attacks and the King of Hell absorbed all the photon beam attacks. The Photon fortress is now being sucked into Dr. Hell. It was revealed that Kenzo realized his mistake when he saw the arm of Zeus. Kenzo has built the King of Hell for Dr. Hell to absorb photon energy. Realizing his mistake, he reprogrammed Gamia Q3 to reverse the polarity of photon where the photon energy will be drained from the King of Hell's body. Gamia Q3 went into the Photon Fortress to reverse the flow of photon energy. Suddenly, inside the King of Hell's body, Dr. Hell was surprised to see Kouji along with Baron Ashura. Baron Ashura, realizing he was tricked by Dr' Hell decides to let Kouji inside to destroy the photon absorbing energy mechanism. It was revealed that it was Dr. Hell who corrupted the bodies of Tristan and Isolde in order to trick Juzo and Tsubasa. Baron Ashura fell off from the Glider and asks Kouji to defeat Dr. Hell. Kouji emerges to fight of Dr. Hell. Mazinger Z was rescued under the sea by Boss Borot. To Dr. Hell's surprise, the 100 Rocket Punches hidden inside the Mazinger Corps was released by Kouji. The 100 Rocket Punches integrated into a giant Rocket Punch that destroyed Dr. Hell. Kenzo tells Tsubasa that if Dr. Hell is defeated the Mycenae empire would come. The Dark General appears and Dr. Hell in his ghostly form, curses Kouji and warns him of a more danger he cannot win. Baron Ashura emerges with Archduke Gorgon to bring back Mycenea empire. Mazinger integrates into the Big Bang Punch and headed straight into the Dark General... The conclusion of this battle is shown in the first part of Episode 2, where Mazinger Z slumbers down.

== Staff ==
- Original work: Go Nagai
- Direction/Scenario: Yasuhiro Imagawa
- Music: Akira Miyagawa
- Opening 1 theme song: Kanjite Knight (感じてKnight) performed by ULTIMATE LAZY for MAZINGER (special group of Lazy, Tamio Okuda, Kazuyoshi Saito and JAM Project)
- Ending 1 theme song: Brand New World performed by Natsuko Aso
- Opening 2 theme song: Shugojin – The guardian (守護神-The guardian) performed by JAM Project
- Ending 2 theme song: Tsuyokimono yo (強き者よ) performed by SKE48
- Sound direction: Tetsu Motoyama
- Character design: Shinji Takeuchi
- Mazinger & mechanical beast design: Tsuyoshi Nonaka
- Art direction: Masatoshi Muto
- Director of photography: Yoshito Kuwa
- Animation production: BEE·MEDIA, Code
- Producer(s): Hasshu Tokuhara, Ichiko Nagai, Satsuki Mizuno, Yoshinaga Minami, Katsumi Koike, Koji Morimoto, Daiki Hasebe
- Planning: Takashi Nagai, Shunji Inoe, Kazumi Kawashiro
- Series organization: Yasuhiro Imagawa
- Narrator: Tessho Genda

== Media ==
=== Home video ===
Besides the several video on demand internet services that show the Bandai Channel stream freely in Japan, the series will be released in both DVD and Blu-ray formats. So far two DVDs and one Blu-ray box have been announced.

Discotek Media has licensed the series, which was released on DVD in 2015.

The series is also scheduled for a release on DVD and Blu-ray in Spain and Mexico (only in DVD) as Mazinger Edición Z Impacto!

The series is available in both DVD and Blu-ray in Italy as "Mazinger Edition Z: The Impact!", by Yamato Video.

=== Music ===
Each one of the opening and ending themes have been released as EP CDs. Also the soundtrack is available in CD. All of them have been published by Lantis.

Title	Type	Tracks	Artist	Standard number	Release date
Kanjite Knight	EP (OP1)	4	ULTIMATE LAZY for MAZINGER	LACM-4601	April 22, 2009
Brand new world	EP (ED1)	4	Natsuko Aso	LACM-4612	May 27, 2009
TV anime Shin Mazinger Shogeki! Z Hen Original Soundtrack Vol.1	Soundtrack album	31	Akira Miyagawa	LACA-5919	June 24, 2009
Shugojin – The guardian	EP (OP2)	4	JAM Project	LACM-4632	August 5, 2009
Tsuyoki Mono yo	EP (ED2)	4	SKE48	LACM-4638	August 5, 2009
TV anime Shin Mazinger Shogeki! Z Hen Original Soundtrack Vol.2	Soundtrack album	30	Akira Miyagawa	LACA-5966	October 7, 2009

== Manga ==
=== Shin Mazinger Zero ===
Although published along the anime series, the manga Shin Mazinger Zero (真マジンガーゼロ, Shin Mazingā Zero; lit. 'True Mazinger Zero') is not an adaptation of its story. Written by Yoshiaki Tabata with art by Yuki Yogo, it is an original production which takes elements from several past versions of the Mazinger concept. The plot deals with Humanity being destroyed by an evil Mazinger Z. Koji Kabuto, the last man alive, is killed by a human-sized, human-looking Minerva X so his spirit can travel back in time to prevent the disaster—but it takes several tries. Ultimately, parallel universes become a theme in the story, enabling cameos from several different versions of Mazinger Z, including Gosaku Ota's manga version of Koji (a cyborg) and Nagai's 1990 reimagining of Mazinger Z, Mazin Saga (a man wearing an armor that turns him into a giant). Shin Mazinger Zero also includes guest stars from Nagai's more risqué works, such as the nude warrior Kekko Kamen, and as such, contains high-levels of gore and sexual content. It spawned a sequel entitled Shin Mazinger Zero vs. The Great General of Darkness (真マジンガーゼロVS暗黒大将軍, Shin Mazingā Zero vs Ankoku Daishōgun), which focuses on Great Mazinger, with cameos from UFO Robo Grendizer and its cast. The sequel is four volumes long and still ongoing as of July 2014.

=== Mazinger Edition H: The Impact! ===
Mazinger Edition H: The Impact! (真マジンガー衝撃！H編, Shin Majingā Shōgeki! Ecchi Hen; lit. 'True Mazinger Impact! Chapter H') is a special one-shot sexy gag comedy done by Go Nagai and published in the magazine Champion Red Ichigo on August 19, 2009 (cover date October 2009).
