= List of Mazinger characters =

This is a list of characters from the anime and manga series Mazinger Z, Great Mazinger, Grendizer, and Mazinkaiser, as well as the Shin Mazinger reboot. It lists the main players of the plots as well as minor characters or others that did not appear in more than one chapter.

== From Mazinger Z ==
=== Koji Kabuto ===
Koji Kabuto (兜 甲児, Kabuto Kōji), also written Kouji Kabuto, is the main character and pilot of super robot Mazinger Z. Koji was born as the first child of Kenzo Kabuto, a scientist and Tsubasa Nishikiori, a bioquimic. Koji Kabuto is also the grandson of Juzo Kabuto. He makes a comeback in the sequel series Great Mazinger where he helps defeating the Mycenaean Empire. He also features in Grendizer as Duke Fleed's friend and sidekick. His voice actor is Hiroya Ishimaru in the Japanese version of Mazinger Z and Mazinkaiser, and in Toei's 1970s English dub, he was voiced by Dando Kluever. His voice actor in Tranzor Z, in which he was renamed Tommy Davis, was Gregg Berger. In the English version of Mazinkaiser, his voice actor is Robert Newell while in Shin Mazinger Shougeki! Z Hen, his voice is played by Kenji Akabane. In Mazinger Z: Infinity, Koji is voiced by Showtaro Morikubo while in the English dub, he is voiced by Wayne Grayson. He is a staple character of Super Robot Wars and appears in nearly every incarnation, the exceptions being Super Robot Wars UX and the OG series. Kabuto's date of birth is November 12.

=== Aphrodite A ===
Aphrodite A (アフロダイA, Afurodai Ēsu) is a robot created by Dr. Yumi, Dr. Kabuto's apprentice. Since it was originally built for peaceful uses, at first it didn't feature any weapons. Eventually, it acquires the ability to fire missiles from its chest with what was called the Oppai Missile System (Oppai being a Japanese slang term for breasts). Aphrodite was the first female mecha to have this kind of weapon.

Despite the fact that it was made of the same alloy as Mazinger (Chogokin or Super-Alloy Z), it usually suffers substantially greater damage from attacks. Regardless of these shortcomings, in several opportunities she provides help in battle, and even destroys three Mechanical Beasts in the anime: Gumbina M5 (Chapter 49), Yubrin T9 (Chapter 56), and Giant F3 (Chapter 58). Her missiles also cause the unintentional destruction of Minerva X.

=== Sayaka Yumi ===
Voiced by: Sumire Uesaka

Sayaka Yumi (弓さやか, Yumi Sayaka) is one of the heroine of Go Nagai's manga and anime Mazinger Z. She was a bit hot-tempered and tomboyish, and had a habit of clashing with the story's hero, Koji Kabuto even though she had a romantic interest in him. In the English Tranzor Z dub, she is renamed Jessica Davis (no relation to "Tommy" (Kouji)).

She was voiced by three people in the original series: Tomoko Matsushima, Minori Matsushima (reprised the role for Super Robot Wars), and Kotoe Taichi (credited as Noriko Egawa, also appeared in Great Mazinger). She was voiced by Ai Uchikawa in Mazinkaiser. In the Italian dub of the original series, Sayaka is voiced by Liliana Sorrentino, and her Spanish voice actress is Gloria Gonzalez. Her Tranzor Z voice actress is Mona Marshall, but in Toei's 1970s dub, Sayaka was played by Priscilla Piano.

Sayaka has since made cameos in other Go Nagai series such as New Cutie Honey and the Devilman TV series, and has been featured or mentioned in such diverse places as the Super Robot Wars games and the lyrics of reggaeton songs.

=== Shiro Kabuto ===
Shiro Kabuto (兜シロー, Kabuto Shirō) is Koji's younger brother. Most of the time, Shiro's role is to add some comic relief to the plot. He remains in Japan when Koji departs at the beginning of Great Mazinger. His character acquires a bit more depth in Great Mazinger, as he becomes acquainted with his father Kenzo, who was previously thought to be dead. Toward the end of the series, Shiro finally bonds with Kenzo, who died shortly thereafter. He even gets to pilot his own robot in Great Mazinger, the Robot Junior.

Shiro was renamed Toad in Tranzor Z. He is voiced by Kazuko Sawada in the original version, by Dana Ikeda in Toei's English dub, and by Mona Marshall in Tranzor Z (he is one of the few Mazinger characters whose English voice actor in Tranzor Z has been confirmed).

=== Boss ===
Boss was a main protagonist in both Mazinger Z and Great Mazinger starting in episode 3 of the original series. Boss and his gang, Nuke and Mucha, were the comic relief characters. Boss began as a bully and Kabuto Koji's rival at school, but quickly became an ally, often scouting for Mazinger Z on his motorcycle, or getting into some sort of slapstick mischief. In Great Mazinger, Kabuto Shiro and Bakarasu also join the gang with the latter always annoying Boss. He is also Sayaka Yumi's long-time school friend and has a huge crush on her. In the Great Mazinger, since the firsts episodes, he fall in loves with Jun Hono as well, stricken by her beauty; but she doesn't feel the same for him, and worse, Tetsuya, while not officially her boyfriend, doesn't like Boss's attempts and often fights with Boss.

In episode 48 of Mazinger Z, Boss and his gang found an abandoned warehouse full of junk, and inspired by events from the previous episode kidnapped the scientists at the Photonic Research Institute to build Boss his own giant robot, the Boss Borot, out of the junk in the warehouse. Although it was of poor performance due to being made out of junk, Boss Borot would often fight mechanical beasts, enemy infantry, and later warrior beasts. Although Boss Borot was equipped with a variety of weapons and accessories, it normally went into battle with nothing and was noted for its head changing shape to fit Boss's emotional reactions.

Boss is voiced by Hiroshi Ōtake in the original Japanese version. In Tranzor Z, the American translation of Mazinger Z, Boss was named Bobo, and his robot was named "Bobo-bot". Bobo's English voice actor was Patrick Pinney, though it is likely he had more than one voice actor as he sounded quite different in later episodes. Boss also made occasional appearances in Grendizer, was one of the main characters in the Mazinkaiser mini-series, and was a minor character in the remake Shin Mazinger Shougeki! Z Hen.

=== Mucha & Nuke ===
Mucha and Nuke are Boss's sidekicks who follow him around, help in his schemes and ride with him in Boss Borot.

In Shin Mazinger they are shown to be formidable fighters in their own right, Nuke showing surprising skill in drunken fist kung-fu (claiming to be the Japanese champion) and Mucha specializing in flicking spiked metal balls.

In Tranzor Z, the American adaptation of Mazinger Z, Mucha was renamed Jim and Nuke was renamed Chris.

=== Misato ===
Misato is Boss' cousin, who comes to the Photon Power Laboratory to work as a maid of sorts somewhat after episode 64. She is somewhat resented by Sayaka for the attention Koji gives her. Misato proves herself in combat on multiple occasions, but most of the time she stays at the laboratory.

In Tranzor Z, the American adaptation of Mazinger Z, Misato was renamed Sally. Her Japanese voice actress is Nana Yamaguchi; her English voice actress is unknown.

=== Gennosuke Yumi ===
Gennosuke Yumi (弓弦之助, Yumi Gennosuke) was a colleague of Juzo Kabuto and ran the laboratory where Mazinger Z was headquartered. He is the father of Sayaka Yumi, Koji's best friend and love interest. Measured and wise, he is the stabilizing force behind Koji's foolhardiness in battle. Many times he anticipates to Hell's plans and under his guidance many battles are won. Yumi is not particularly demonstrative neither with his daughter nor his fellow scientists, but he seems to care a lot for them. In a couple of occasions, when defeat seems inevitable, he is ready to commit suicide before leaving his Institute, like a captain ready to sink with his ship.

Because of his years working with Dr. Kabuto, he is aware of many of his secrets, such as the plans for Minerva X and the existence of the Mikene Empire. He built Aphrodite A, based on Dr. Kabuto's work, and hence both she and Mazinger share a similar internal structure. His background before his work for Dr. Kabuto and the Institute and the identity of Sayaka's mother are unknown.

In Tranzor Z, the American adaptation of Mazinger Z, Dr. Yumi was renamed Dr. Davis.

=== Juzo Kabuto ===
Juzo Kabuto (兜十蔵, Kabuto Jūzō) was a previous colleague of Dr. Hell and created Mazinger Z in order to oppose Hell's plans for world domination. Hell sent Baron Ashura to kill Juzo before he could present a threat, and he was fatally injured in the attack, but survived long enough to tell Koji about Mazinger Z and how it must be used to defeat Dr. Hell.

In Mazinkaiser OVA, Juzo Kabuto was retconned into surviving without Koji or anyone's knowledge, and worked in another secret underground laboratory where he finished the final and more powerful version of Great Mazinger and then his ultimate creation, Mazinkaiser. He later appeared to Koji via hologram, telling him about Mazinkaiser. Whether he was still alive, and if so, where he currently was, is unknown.

Note that, in the original manga and the Mazinkaiser OVA, Juzo Kabuto presents several physical scars (more exactly, half his face is burned) and is more hot-tempered and even slightly megalomaniac. His TV series rendition is lots more calmer and stable, and also has a rather normal outlook. His Shin Mazinger incarnation however seems to be every bit as megalomaniacal as the manga version.

=== Professors Sewashi, Nossori & Mori Mori ===
Three scientists who work around the laboratory and help Professor Yumi, and sometimes provide comic relief. Within the storyline, Mori Mori seems doomed to die; in episode 79 of Mazinger Z series he dies in an explosion caused by a landmine placed by Dr. Hell's minions that blows up his jeep while trying to rescue Koji; in Mazinkaiser he sacrifices himself manually launching nuclear missiles aimed at General Rigarn and his Warrior Beasts so that Koji and Sayaka can get to Japan in a jet.

In Tranzor Z, the American adaptation of Mazinger Z, Sewashi was renamed Professor Manning. Professors Mori Mori and Nossori went unnamed in Tranzor Z, though they were all collectively referred to as "The Three Professors" on several occasions. In some incarnations of the show they are known as Iz, Biz and Diz.

=== Dr. Hell ===
Dr. Hell is the main villain of Mazinger Z, its spinoff Mazinkaiser, and its remake Shin Mazinger Shougeki! Z Hen. He was a brilliant, cunning, and evil scientist, obsessed with world domination through his creations, the armies of Mechanical Beasts. He was a colleague of Dr. Kabuto, a well-meaning scientist, and accompanied him on an archeological expedition to the Greek island of Bardos, where ruins of the ancient Mikenese Empire were found. There they discovered that the ancient Mikenese civilization had the technology to build giant robotic warriors. Hell stole that technology and used it to create an army of fighting machines with which he planned to conquer the world which he dubbed the Underground Empire. Dr. Kabuto used this technology coupled with an alloy he'd created to build a robot, Mazinger Z, to halt Hell's plans for world conquest. Time and again Dr. Hell's robots were destroyed by Mazinger Z, sometimes due to the in-fighting between his lieutenants Baron Ashura and Count Brocken. After nearly all of his robots had been destroyed Mazinger Z and his allies traveled to Dr. Hell's island of black iron, Hell and Count Brocken were apparently killed while attempting to flee in the Gool, their giant airship.

In Tranzor Z, the American imported version, Dr. Hell was called Dr. Daemon. In the Arabic version it has been changed to Abou'el Gathab (Father of Rage).

=== Baron Ashura ===
Baron Ashura is the gynandromorphic servant of Dr. Hell. Mazinger's most persistent enemy, they make regular appearances in the Super Robot Wars series alongside their creator. Ashura, because of their split-gendered nature, is voiced by both a male and female voice actor.

Baron Ashura's origin began long ago with a man and woman who fell in love. Their love was forbidden and upon discovery, the lovers shared a terrible fate: they were mummified and buried alive. Many years later, a cave in collapsed the roof of the tomb. A huge chunk of rubble landed between the two corpses, destroying the man's right half and the woman's left half. The would-be world conqueror Dr. Hell stumbled upon the tomb. He sewed the two remaining halves together and then brought the composite being to life. The new being swore loyalty to Dr. Hell. Dubbing his creation Baron Ashura, Dr. Hell used them as his main henchman.

While not a pilot, Ashura has commanded Dr. Hell's Salude and Bood submarines and at one point also is appointed as the pilot of Daima U5 by Dr. Hell in episode 27 of the television series. In episode 78, Ashura fatally wounded themself crashing the Bood into Mazinger Z in a futile attempt to destroy the robot. Duke Gorgon saw the dying Baron on the sea surface and tried to save Ashura. Baron Ashura died in the arms of their enemy, who finally acknowledged their bravery. In the next episode, Ashura was homaged with mechanical beast Jetfire P1 resembling their face.

Baron Ashura appears again in every episode of Mazinkaiser until Dr. Hell transforms Ashura into the mechanical monster King Gordon. Baron Ashura also appears in Shin Mazinger Shougeki! Z Hen faithful to their role although their origin was given more depth as it is revealed in the series Ashura was a pair of Mycenaen servants named Tristan and Isolde.

Ashura is renamed Devleen in the Tranzor Z dub. Despite the censorship that took place in adapting Mazinger Z into Tranzor Z, Devleen's distinction of being a half-man, half-woman was retained.

In most versions Ashura has separate voice male and female voice actors. In Japanese, the male side was played by Hidekatsu Shibata and the female by Haruko Kitahama; in Toei's dub, the male side is played by William Sayler and the female by Elizabeth Wichmann. Ashura's Tranzor Z equivalent, Devleen, is listed as being played by Gregg Berger (the same voice actor as Kouji Kabuto's equivalent, Tommy Davis).

=== Count Brocken ===
Count Brocken (Broken), sometimes spelled as Blocken, was a villain from the fictional robot story Mazinger Z that first appeared in episode 40. He is a cyborg whose head was hewn from his body during a car accident and he carried it around with him. (Due to being decapitated, he is known as Count Decapito in Tranzor Z.) He sometimes carries it under his arm, but it has the ability to float on its own. In the Manga version penned by Go Nagai and fellow Gosaku Ota the character's background is quite grimmer as in the comic Brocken was none other than a Nazi Waffen-SS officer who suffered fatal wounds during the battles of WW2, at the time Doctor Hell was serving the Third Reich as medical experimenter in the death camps and was given the task of saving Brocken's life. Not being able to restore nervous and vascular connections in the neck he chose to sever them altogether placing the rescinded head in a vat of nourishing/regenerative bath, thus creating the decapitated count. As the war ended Hell and Brocken parted ways but he returned to head the "Iron Crosses Corps" to aid Hell's plans for world domination via mechanical monsters. The Nazi motif in this background justified Blocken's penchant for militaristic attire complete with Sam Browne belt, as well the cross motif and the teutonic helmets worn by his stormtroopers while Ashura, resulting from a jigsaw combination of ancient mummies, outfitted his Ashura Corps to resemble mikenese warriors.

Competition between him and Baron Ashura was fierce, Ashura to regain Hell's favor and Brocken to prove himself the better commander. Brocken was given Gool to attack as well as a loyal army of soldiers, the Iron Crosses; at one point he also piloted the mechanical beast Blogun G3. However, Brocken was also unable to gain the advantage over Mazinger Z despite repeated tries, sometimes due to his own stupidity. He dies with Dr. Hell in episode 91 when Mazinger Z blew up the Gool while attempting to escape. Brocken appears as a direct competition to Ashura, demoting him as Hell's main servant and forcing him to work as a team in a number of occasions, mostly with terrible results, to the point of ordering their respective mechanical beasts to fight each other to prevent each other from defeating Mazinger. Nevertheless, it's because of their collaboration that Dr. Hell finally achieves one of his goals: to obtain Super Alloy Z and build a mechanical monster with it, Balmos Q7. His plans are spoiled when Ashura disobeys his orders out of jealousy and leaves Mazinger unwatched, who manages to escape from Fortress Bood and destroys Dr. Hell's monster. Before his death, Ashura faces a group of Iron Crosses, loyal to Brocken, that had planned to kill him without Brocken's knowledge. When he finds out about this, he rushes to stop them, although Ashura had already taken care of them. However, he doesn't believe his foe wasn't behind the attack and escapes from Dr. Hell's island. Brocken shows a certain degree of respect towards Ashura when he dies in battle.

In the Parody OVA CB Chara Nagai Go World, Brocken is played up comically and extremely perverted. His body at one time was also stolen by Jinmen of the Devilman series. Brocken also makes a brief cameo in OVA adaption of Delinquent in Drag. Count Brocken appears again in Shin Mazinger Shogeki! Z Hen, as one of Dr. Hell's generals. In the first episode he is killed by Koji using Mazinger Z's "Big Bang Punch". In episode 5, however, he is introduced into the story, deploying Groizer X-10 to destroy Mazinger Z. Near the end of the series he pilots the mechanical beast Brocken V2 Schneider, although he is defeated by Sayaka in the Venus A.

=== Viscount Pygman ===
Viscount Pygman was a physically bizarre creation with the body of a pygmy shaman atop the body of a large tribal warrior, holding a shield and spear. Unlike Dr. Hell's other lieutenants, Viscount Pygman had little loyalty to his creator, and stole one of his robot warriors to destroy Mazinger Z on his own. Pygman's background before being turned into Hell's servant is largely unknown. He has telepathic powers, the ability to fly and spit fire, and is also capable of using voodoo against his enemies. Pygman is also notable as being the only recurring character from Mazinger Z not to appear in the American adaptation Tranzor Z.

=== Iron Masks ===
Iron Masks were the foot soldiers in Dr. Hell's army, wearing bell-like helmets that covered the upper halves of their heads with holes for their eyes. They are apparently robotic, and can be self-destructed by remote control. For the most part they served as grunts for Baron Ashura on his operations.

=== Iron Crosses ===
Iron Crosses were the new soldiers introduced into Dr. Hell's army when Count Blocken was recruited. They resembled Nazi stormtroopers and had large, googly eyes. They tended to work as grunts exclusively in operations led by Count Blocken.

=== Bakarasu ===
Bakarasu is a crow (its name being taken from the Japanese words 'Baka' roughly meaning 'Stupid', and 'Karasu' meaning crow) was a character who appeared in episode 69 of Mazinger Z, but returned and became a semi-regular character in Great Mazinger, appearing in a little over a third of the total series. Theoretically he works for Boss alongside Mucha and Nuke, but he has no real loyalty to the group. Generally Boss either uses him as a lookout (for either Warrior Beasts or Jun) or as a messenger (normally to Jun).

Bakarasu appeared in Tranzor Z, the American adaptation of Mazinger Z, and was renamed Aesop for his only appearance in that series.

=== Dr. Stroheim Heinrich ===
Another ex-collaborator of Dr. Hell. After a car accident, Dr. Hell turns him into a cyborg, but this time holds back his unfortunate tendency to turn those he brings back to life into total freaks and hence Heinrich only has blue skin and is full of stitches all over his body. His head sports a mechanical device, that extends to one of the sides of his face and covers his right eye, which can fire beams. Heinrich had worked for Hell developing a powerful monster, but for reasons unclear he deserts him and takes away the unfinished robot along with him.

After some time Ashura is commended to find him and the robot. Heinrich now lives with his daughter Lorelai, and refuses to collaborate with Hell again. Eventually his beast is released, Rhine X1, and moments before his death, he tells Lorelai how to control it to fight Mazinger, since he is sure his creation is superior than Dr. Kabuto's.

In Shin Mazinger, it is hinted at that he had feelings for Nishikiori Tsubasa.

=== Lorelai ===
A robot who looks like a normal little girl, she befriends Shiro at school. She believes herself to be the real daughter of Dr. Heinrich, until her father tells her the truth with his dying breath and calls her "his best creation ever." Distraught and heartbroken, Lorelai merges with her father's other robot, Rhine X1, so Koji is forced to face and destroy her.

=== Tetsuya Tsurugi ===
Tetsuya Tsurugi (剣 鉄也, Tsurugi Tetsuya) is an orphan young man raised by Dr. Kenzo Kabuto along with his friend Jun, and trained to be the pilot of Great Mazinger ever since he was young. At first shown only as a bad-tempered young man with a heart of gold under his hot-headness, he later develops a strong jealousy against his adoptive brother Koji. Tetsuya served as the main character in Great Mazinger and first appeared in the final episode of Mazinger Z. In Shin Mazinger Z Impact, Tsurugi's background is modified towards an implication that he is the biological younger brother of Tsubasa Nishikiori. This twist, in turn, makes him an uncle to Koji and Shiro as well as brother-in-law to Professor Kenzo Kabuto. He also takes up the codename "Blade" as the initially mysterious pilot of the Great Mazinger.

=== Archduke Gorgon ===
Archduke Gorgon was a villain who was seen primarily in Great Mazinger, but first appeared in Mazinger Z starting in episode 68 and was a main villain for the rest of the series. He resembles a centaur somewhat, as from the waist up he is a green-skinned man, but below the waist has the body of a saber-toothed tiger. However, his human half is attached to the rear part of the tiger, so it still has its own head. Gorgon was sent by the Mikene Empire to overlook the development of events between Dr. Hell and Mazinger Z, so that everything went according to the plans of the Emperor of Darkness. Hence, he plays an ambivalent role, both of alliance and treason with Hell. He provides him with powerful Warrior Beasts, but his true goal is to use Hell's forces to eliminate Mazinger and then take over with Mikene's own. Allegedly, they forge a deal in the Island of Bardos to collaborate in Mazinger's destruction, but at the end of the series, when the time comes Gorgon leaves Hell to his own fate alone. During this period, he interacts with Hell's henchmen, Baron Ashura and Count Blocken, who are intimidated by him and usually adopt a submissive attitude, except for Ashura's last attempt to regain his honor when he confronts Gorgon asking him to grant him a monster to fight, and eventually dies trying. Ashura dies in the arms of Gorgon, who finally acknowledges his bravery.

In the anime version, after Hell's death, Gorgon sends Gratonios and Pilanias to finish Mazinger off. Great Mazinger's intervention in the last minute is the link to the continuation of the saga, were Gorgon can be seen as a less powerful figure compared to his superiors, the Great General of Darkness and Minister Argos. Due to internal struggles for power that involve the Seven Generals, the Great General and Minister Argos, Gorgon is somewhat betrayed and during the construction of a new Mikene base, he intercepted Great Mazinger as it attacked the warrior beast Dandaros. Upon trying to save the warrior beast Gorgon flies in and is shattered by the Thunder Break, tossing his body into the sea shortly after. He is seen in his last moments with his tiger body destroyed, carrying his feline head under his arm, and the Emperor of Darkness congratulates him for constructing the new Mikene Empire base. He would be replaced by Marquis Janus.

In the Mazinkaiser vs the Great General of Darkness OVA, he reprises his role being his sole mission to slaughter Koji Kabuto. Unlike the original version this version of Gorgon was organic as opposed to being a cyborg. Koji finally kills him when he shoots his gun, hitting both his tiger and human brains with only one shot. Gorgon returns in Shin Mazinger Shougeki! Z Hen although he is far more aggressive toward Dr. Hell and his men; like the Mazinkaiser version he is also organic in this incarnation.

Gorgon was seen in the American export of Mazinger Z, Tranzor Z, a number of times. In that version he was referred to as Genghis the Ghastly. In the last episode he declared that with Dr. Demon (Hell) out of the way, the stage was set for his own domination of the world, which was to have been the lead-in to Great Mazinger. However, since the sequel series was never imported to America, nothing ever came of this as far as Tranzor Z was concerned.

=== Kenzo Kabuto ===
Kenzo Kabuto (兜剣造, Kabuto Kenzō) was the son of Juzo Kabuto, the inventor of Mazinger Z, but working in secret he improved upon the original designs to create the more formidable Great Mazinger. After a laboratory experiment that went wrong, he and his wife are thought to be dead. However, he was instead turned into a cyborg by his father in order to keep him alive. To shield them from danger and psychological shock, Kenzo's sons Koji and Shiro are unaware of this and grow believing both of their parents are dead, and were raised by Juzo.

Kenzo reveals the truth to both of them in the Great Mazinger series, first to Shiro, since Koji was away for a big part of the series, and their relationship would cause conflict with his adopted son Tetsuya, who was raised by Kenzo together with his best friend Jun and comes to feel intensely jealous of Kenzo's actual children, especially so of Koji. Dr. Kabuto would eventually die in battle at the end of the series and Tetsuya and Koji fight together to avenge his death.

== From Great Mazinger ==
=== Jun Hono ===
Jun Hono (炎ジュン, Honoo Jun) showed up in the first episode of Great Mazinger. An orphan girl raised by Kenzo Kabuto along with Tetsuya Tsurugi, she is half Japanese, half Afro-American, from her father's side, and because of that she often felt rejected as a child. She was trained to pilot the female robot Venus A to support Great Mazinger. Unlike Sayaka, who was well-meaning and brave yet had no real self-defense skills, Jun is very capable of defending herself outside of the robotic battlefield, as she showed her martial arts skills when she managed to fight back an attack of many soldiers alone, even if she is captured at the end of the fight. She was also specifically trained to use Venus A in combat for years, unlike Sayaka who had to learn to use Aphrodite and Diana as the story progressed. But similar to Sayaka, she argues and fights with Tetsuya and has an active role in the series. Jun, with Venus robot has a considerable firepower: missile-fingers, breast-missiles, photonic-rays; but, while being far powerful than Aphrodite A, she is regularly defeated by the enemy monsters, and often badly damaged. While Mazinger is away (often there are two monsters, one of the two on a diversive action, while the other attacks the Mazinger's base), Venus often fights alone, and is saved only by Boss's robot. Typically, when the two are almost destroyed, finally Mazinger comes and destroys the second monster, just in time to save his fellows.

Jun is oppressed by her origins, since her father was African-American (probably a reflex of the US occupation of Japan), her skin is darker than the usual and this apparently led some racism against Jun in her childhood, as displayed by several episodes. But, maybe related to her mixed origins, Jun is also a 'junonic' girl, her body seems quite strong and muscular, but still very sexy; she wears a white, short skirt and a tight T-shirt. Boss, already a Sayaka fan, cannot resist to her gorgeous appearance, and falls instantly in love when meets her; however, Jun never shares that feeling. Basically, she is attracted by Tetsuya and always faithfully devoted to help him, but he is too hastily concentrated to train himself and fight the enemy and apparently, he has no time for the love.

Jun showed up in the first two episodes of Mazinkaiser OVA and worked in the institute as an assistant. In the end of the second episode, she left with Tetsuya to help him recover from his wounds. She showed up again in the finale episode with Tetsuya and helped Sayaka, Boss, Shiro and the others by taking them to Juzo Kabuto's lab and explaining to them every thing they found in there. Jun showed up again in the Mazinkaiser vs General of Darkness movie but this time piloting the original Venus A. She and Tetsuya are the only two that survived from the Mazinger army. As she fought to repel the attack to Sydney, Venus was destroyed and virtually dismembered by the enemy, but despite being seriously injured by a warrior beast, Jun survived due to the Queen Star ejecting out.

=== The Emperor of Darkness ===
The Emperor of Darkness (闇の帝王, Yami no Teiō) was a supervillain and warlord from the manga and anime series Great Mazinger. Great Mazinger was the sequel to the wildly popular Mazinger Z. It was depicted as a large flaming entity. As the Emperor of the Mikene Empire, he was the true enemy behind Ankoku Daishogun and the Great Marshall of Hell. His defeat marked the end of the Mikene Empire. He is the only survivor of the final battle in Great Mazinger because he never was with his troops. He survives the series too. The only story where he is finally killed (accidentally by Koji after his offer to help Duke Fleed against Vega) is the manga version of UFO Robot Grendizer drawn by Gosaku Ota. In Shin Mazinger Shougeki! Z Hen, his true identity is the deity Hades who came from the original planet of the Mykene Empire and an enemy of Zeus. He took the identity of the Great Emperor of Darkness after Zeus threw him a Rocket punch of his own and sank along with Bardos Island.

=== Ankoku Daishogun ===
Ankoku Daishogun (暗黒大将軍) (literally translating to Great General of Darkness) was a supervillain and warlord from the series Great Mazinger. He takes the form of a gigantic warrior wearing a helmet decorated with three horns, a long red cape and vaguely Roman-like armor. His true face is that of a bearded old man and is set into his chest. He reappeared in the OVA Deathmatch! Mazinkaiser VS The Great General of Darkness, redesigned; his new look has him sporting black armor, a black cape with red insides, and a smaller true face. In this OVA it is revealed that Ankoku Daishogun is his literal name, not just his title. Because of this his name is often literally translated in English to Great General of Darkness or General Dark while in Italian translations he is translated as Generale Nero.

The supreme commander of the Mikene Empire (Mikene Teikoku), Ankoku leads the seven Mikene armies in their conquest of the surface world. Forced underground centuries before, the Mikene further developed the golem technology Dr. Hell discovered and used to create his Mechanical Beasts. Instead of purely mechanical mecha, the Mikene Warrior Beasts are a nightmarish combination of flesh and machine, and are far more powerful than their purely mechanical cousins. In the anime, the first appearance of Ankoku Daishogun was in the final Mazinger Z episode (ep. 92). He reappeared as the main antagonist in the animated film Mazinger Z vs. The Great General of Darkness. He then appeared in episodes 1 to 31 of the Great Mazinger anime. He is killed by Great Mazinger in episode 31, and is replaced with The Great Marshall of Hell as leader of the Mikene forces shortly after.

In all of his incarnations, the Ankoku is a force to be reckoned with. In close combat he wields a mighty sword capable of slicing mountains in Shin Mazinger Z and bashing through opponents. While at a distance, he can unleash purple-colored beams from his eyes that are powerful enough to match Mazinkaiser's Koushiryoku Beam. On the defensive end, Ankoku is no slouch either; as his cape can withstand Fire Blaster's intense heat, and his true face survived a direct strike from Great Mazinger's swords and in his 2003 incarnation, a direct blast from Mazinkaiser's Koushiryoku Beams, which were shown to be powerful to destroy the Mikene warrior Dante with one strike.

=== Minister Argos ===
Minister Argos was a villain from the manga and anime Great Mazinger. He primarily advises the series' other villains, and rarely directly commands Warrior Beasts. Like most of the rest of the Mikenese, he is roughly 25 meters tall, dressed in armor, and his "normal" head seems entirely decorative. Unlike most of the rest of the Mikenese, however, his "real" head is housed in the pommel of his cane rather than his chest; Minister Argos's chest instead houses a giant computer, which assumed houses the great wisdom he uses to advise other Mikenese. In episode 9 it was revealed that he considered the warrior beast, Cleo, as his daughter. Minister Argos began the series as an adviser to Archduke Gorgon. As demonstrated in episode 17 he can use his beard as a sword and use it well enough to hold his own against Ankoku Daishogun. After Archduke Gorgon died in the 21st episode of the anime, Minister Argos became the adviser of Gorgon's replacement, Marquis Janus. In episode 54 Great Mazinger uses a Drill pressure Punch to tear through Minister Argos's torso and breaks his left arm off, leaving him as only a head for the last two episodes. Minister Argos also appears in Super Robot Wars Alpha 2 reprising his role as the Mikene Empire's primary adviser.

=== Marquis Janus ===
Marquis Janus, also named Marquis Yanus, is a villain in the anime and manga Great Mazinger. She is a witch in a long red dress with horn-shaped purple hair, reminiscent of the headdress of Maleficent. She carries a white wooden staff, and has a black cat perched on her shoulder. Her various "witchcraft" powers include flight, teleportation, invisibility, and the ability to control people by jamming an electronic spike into their heads. Like the rest of the Mikenese, Marquis Janus has two faces much like the Roman god of the same name; at various times, her head spins 180 degrees, hiding her "beautiful" face and revealing the hag-like "evil" face that is usually concealed under her hair.

She first appeared in the 22nd episode of the Great Mazinger anime as a replacement for Archduke Gorgon after Archduke Gorgon was accidentally killed by Great Mazinger in the previous episode. As Archduke Gorgon did before her, she retains Minister Argos as her chief adviser.

Marquis Janus has her own mecha, the Janus Koushaku, is roughly the same size as the Mikenese Generals and Great Mazinger (around 20 meters) and resembles a demonic version of herself; in episode 51 the Janus Koushaku appears to have the ability to reduce its size so far as to appear as a human. The mecha's cockpit is in its left breast and is armed with sharp fingernail claws and eye beams designed to knock people out (although this is an ability Janus herself uses). Both of them appear in Super Robot Wars 64, making it their only appearance in the cross-over franchise; in it Janus Koushaku is armed with a heat ray from its torso instead of eye beams, but retains her claws. Marquis Janus finally meets her end in the final episode (56) of Great Mazinger, when she is destroyed along the Great Marshall Of Hell in the explosion of the fortress Demonika.

=== General Julicaesar ===
Superhuman General Julicaesar was commander of the Superhuman Battle Beasts, one of the Seven Armies of the Mikene Empire. He resembles a gigantic human warrior with purple skin and dressed in Roman-style armour, with a flaming circular crest on his head. His true face was originally mounted on his chest, but in his redesign in the Mazinkaiser VS the Great General of Darkness OVA it was placed on his flaming crest instead.

According to his profile included in the Mazinkaiser VS the Great General of Darkness OVA, his army is the largest of the Seven Armies and he is considered by many to be the Great General of Darkness' right-hand man. According to his manga description, Julicaesar dislikes the use of dirty tactics and proudly confronts enemies head on. He can detach the flaming crest situated on his head and throw it at a target much like a boomerang, as seen in his one-sided battle against Baion Beta, and when he was in pursuit of Koji Kabuto in his Kaiser Pilder. However, it can be noted that in the original series, General Julicaesar throws his entire head at enemies instead of the crest alone.

=== General Hadias ===
Evil Spirit General Hadias was commander of the Spectral Battle Beasts, one of the Seven Armies of the Mikene Empire. He resembles a gigantic skeleton wearing a ragged cloak with an upside-down skull for a head. His true face is mounted on his chest in the original anime version. In his redesign for the Mazinkaiser OVA, his true face is hidden in darkness inside his cloak with only the glowing eyes are visible while the skull is now covered in blue flames. He wields a scythe as his weapon of choice in both versions. According to his profile included in the Mazinkaiser VS the Great General of Darkness OVA, he is a master of psychological warfare and enjoys terrifying and demoralizing his victims before killing them. According to the translation of the Great Mazinger manga, Hadias possesses remarkable psychic powers and has the ability to breathe fire from the head on his hand. Unlike the other generals he actually fought in Great Mazinger, specifically with his scythe acting like a boomerang and could use his legs to form a bony club. Despite this he has the fewest warrior beasts of any general.

General Hadias also appeared in Deathmatch! Mazinkaiser VS the Great General of Darkness. He battled the Mazinger Army member Venus A in Australia along with his Battle Beast army. He easily defeated it, but unknowingly failed to kill the pilot Jun Hono when he ripped her control vehicle out of Venus' head. He and his forces later joined General Draydou and General Julius Caesar at the ruins of the Photoatomic Research Lab at the foot of Mt. Fuji. Together, they intended to kill Koji Kabuto before he could find and activate sea bass. The Generals knew from observing his battles with Dr. Hell that the Super Robot would be a major threat to their conquest of the surface world. They were forced to resort to killing Koji when their surprise attack on the Lab failed to produce Mazinkaiser. The Battle Beasts even ripped a gigantic crater into the ground, trying to dig up its underground facility, but were unable to find it. The mystery of Mazinkaiser's location was solved when Koji managed to board the Kaiser Pilder and began flying upwards towards space, apparently on collision course with an incoming meteor. To their horror, the three Generals realised the meteor was actually Mazinkaiser, which had been stored in space beyond their reach. Despite their best efforts, they were unable to prevent Koji from docking in. After the destruction of their entire force within seconds, the three Generals attempted to face Mazinkaiser themselves. However, after General Julius Caesar was disintegrated by the Super Robot's Rust Tornado attack, Hadias apparently became a victim of his own weapon: fear. A terrified whimper was all that escaped him as he fruitlessly attempted to block Mazinkaiser's Reitou Beam with his scythe, only to be frozen solid then broken into pieces.

=== General Angoras ===
Aquatic General Angoras was commander of the Aquatic Warrior Beasts, one of the Seven Armies of the Mikene Empire. He resembles a humanoid angler fish, with his true face mounted on the tip of his antennae. It is stated in the manga and his Mazinkaiser OVA profile that General Angoras can use the large fins on his head to create enormous tsunamis. According to his profile included in the Mazinkaiser VS the Great General of Darkness OVA, Angoras is an expert ambusher and often strikes victims from below, a tactic often used by his Aquatic Battle Beast forces. According to his manga description, Angoras is the most ruthless among the 7 generals and has no qualms about killing his own Warrior Beasts.

General Angoras reappeared in the Mazinkaiser OVA Deathmatch! Mazinkaiser VS the Great General of Darkness and was killed alongside General Scarabeth by Tetsuya Tsurugi and Great Mazinger. Scarabeth and Angoras led their Insect Battle Beast and Aquatic Battle Beast armies to New York to deal with Great Mazinger. The fact that two armies were sent to fight Great as opposed to one each for the other members of the Mazinger Army shows how dangerous Great was to them. While difficult, Tetsuya defeated most of their troops but as a result was unable to put up much of a fight when the two generals attacked him in tandem. In apparent desperation, he used the Great Boomerang (which the two generals easily avoided) and followed up with Great Typhoon. This second attack was easily shrugged off by Angoras, who mocked Great's weakness. As they moved in for the kill, Scarabeth was suddenly split in two vertically by the Great Boomerang, which then went on to slash Angoras badly on the back and stomach. As he lay dying, a horrified Angoras came to the same conclusion Scarabeth did; the Great Typhoon was never meant to be an attack, it had been meant to change the direction of the Great Boomerang, as well as speed it up so it would do more damage. Tetsuya confirmed this, then finished the two helpless generals off with Breast Burn. Angoras' aquatic forces did not aid their commander in his clash in New York and instead proceeded to Japan, where they were annihilated by Mazinkaiser.

=== General Ligern ===
Wild Beast General Ligern was commander of the Mammalian Battle Beasts, one of the Seven Armies of the Mikene Empire. He resembles a demonic centaur in the original series, with his Warrior face on his chest. In the Mazinkaiser OVA he appears more reptilian, but overall remains the same, as his mane color is changed from green to red and his body armor is now colored black instead of gray. According to his profile included in the Mazinkaiser VS the Great General of Darkness OVA, Ligern is the most vile of the Seven Generals and is unpopular even among his fellow Generals. This is mostly due to his tendency to steal their thunder in attempts to make himself look good. It was apparently only the skill he has in whipping his troops into bloodthirsty frenzies that prevented the Great General of Darkness from killing him personally. According to his manga description, Ligern practices shameless battle tactics and is among the more fierce of the 7 generals. He also the ability to fire electromagnetic beams from his fangs.

General Ligern also reappears in the Mazinkaiser OVA Deathmatch! Mazinkaiser VS the Great General of Darkness and is the only one of the Seven Generals to be killed by human hands rather than at the hands of a mecha. He leads his Mammalian Warrior Beasts, consisting of Mammothos, Doleman and Grabaru, to a remote base in Siberia, where Archduke Gorgon, the Great General's personal assassin, has tracked the pilot of Mazinkaiser Koji Kabuto. Despite knowing the Great General has ordered Gorgon to slay the youth before he could activate the powerful robot, Ligern attempts to steal the Mikene officer's thunder by attacking the base himself. This eagerness proves to be his downfall, as Professor Morimori, one of the professors accompanying Koji and Sayaka, launches a suicidal missile attack that kills him and completely obliterates the Mammalian Battle Warrior Army. Ligern himself is killed when a missile ripped his body (and face) in half before detonating.

=== General Scarabeth ===
Giant Insect General Scarabeth was commander of the Insect Battle Beasts, one of the Seven Armies of the Mikene Empire. He resembles a gigantic rhinoceros beetle, with his true face mounted on his chest. He brings a sword with him in the original Great Mazinger series and in the Mazinkaiser OVA, he has the ability to release streams of binding silk from his insect head in order to immobilize targets. The silk is stated to be as tough as steel. According to his profile included in the Mazinkaiser VS the Great General of Darkness OVA, Scarabeth is one of the most battle-hungry of the Seven Generals. He is also prone to charging into battle far ahead of his troops, putting him at risk of being cut off from support. According to his manga description, Scarabeth is a remarkable tactician, able to create strategies that complete missions with less manpower and resources thought possible.

General Scarabeth reappeared in the Mazinkaiser OVA Deathmatch! Mazinkaiser VS the Great General of Darkness and was killed alongside General Angoras by Tetsuya Tsurugi and Great Mazinger. Scarabeth and Angoras led their Insect Battle Beast and Aquatic Battle Beast armies to New York to deal with Great Mazinger. The fact that two armies were sent to fight Great (as opposed to one each for the other members of the so-called Mazinger Army) shows how dangerous Great was to them. While difficult, Tetsuya defeated most of their troops but as a result was unable to put up much of a fight when the two generals attacked him in tandem. Tetsuta used his famed Thunder Break against the insect-like general, but Scarabus easily shrugged it off. In apparent desperation, he used the Great Boomerang (which the two generals easily avoided) and followed up with Great Typhoon. This second attack was easily shrugged off by Angoras, who mocked Great's weakness. As they moved in for the kill, Scarabeth was suddenly split in two vertically by the Great Boomerang, which then went on to slash Angoras badly on the back and stomach. As he lay dying, a horrified Scarabeth came to the same conclusion Angoras did; the Great Typhoon was never meant to be an attack, it had been meant to change the direction of the Great Boomerang and speed it up so it would do more damage. Tetsuya confirmed this, then finished the two helpless generals off with Breast Burn.

=== General Draydou ===
Reptilian General Draydou was commander of the Reptilian Warrior Beasts, one of the Seven Armies on the Mikene Empire. He was commander of the Reptilian Battle Beasts, one of the Seven Armies of the Mikene Empire. He resembles a humanoid lizard with French musketeer-style garments, with his true face on his chest. In the Mazinkaiser VS the Great General of Darkness OVA his clothes are redesigned to be red instead of blue like in the original series. He is to be the most cunning out of all the 7 generals yet he fights dirty (according to manga translations). He is also said to be one of the more careful generals. He has the ability to breathe a deadly stream of fire from his reptilian head (in manga translations, it is described as "radioactive fire").

Draydou also appeared in Deathmatch! Mazinkaiser VS the Great General of Darkness. He battled the Mazinger Army member Daion Gamma in China along with his Battle Beast army. Despite the best efforts of the Mazinger, Draydou shrugged off his Breast Fire attack and returned fire with his own mouth flames, reducing it to slag. He and his forces later joined General Julicaesar and General Hadias at the ruins of the Photoatomic Research Lab at the foot of Mt. Fuji. Together, they intended to kill Koji Kabuto before he could find and activate Mazinkaiser. The Generals knew from observing his battles with Dr. Hell that the Super Robot would be a major threat to their conquest of the surface world.

=== General Birdler ===
Bird General Birdler was commander of the Aerial Warrior Beasts, one of the Seven Armies on the Mikene Empire. He resembles a demonic angel, with his true face on his chest. He is commander of the Aerial Warriot Beasts, one of the Seven Armies of the Mikene Empire. He resembles a demonic angel, with his true face on his chest.. In the Mazinkaiser OVA his head and neck appear more reptilian, but overall remains the same. In his official character profile for the Mazinkaiser OVA, he is stated to be bullish and overconfident. According to his manga description, Birdler's lightning-fast speed and maneuverability make him a skilled fighter. It is also stated that Birdler has several abilities, as he can launch ultrasonic mouth waves and create shockwaves and tornadoes from his wings.

General Birdler also reappears in the Mazinkaiser OVA Deathmatch! Mazinkaiser VS the Great General of Darkness, although he is the first of the seven generals to be destroyed. He uses the Mikeros to attack Koji before he can reach Mazinkaiser in Japan. He and the Mikeros appear from a massive storm cloud in order to confront Koji, and the diabolical avian orders his aerial army (consisting of Birdian, Obereus, Tollukan and Greydos) to destroy the plane Koji is riding in, but the beasts are destroyed by the Million Alpha, who is escorting Koji. Frustrated by the Million Alpha's interference, Birdler decides to fight the mecha himself killing Lori & Loru but he is killed by a kamikaze attack from the Million Alpha.

=== General Juuma ===
This character only appeared in the Mazinger Z Vs. The Great General of Darkness OVA. His body was composed from parts that identify him with each of the seven Mikene armies, reptilian, superhuman, aerial, insect, aquatic, mammalian and spectral. His position in the Mikene structure is unclear; whereas The Seven Generals, who are not included in the OVA, had each an army under their command, Juuma is apparently appointed ad hoc by The General of Darkness to take seven beasts of his choice and annihilate Mazinger Z after the destruction of many of his favorite monsters by Koji and his robot. Juuma almost succeeds, but Great Mazinger destroys his robots and finishes him off together with Mazinger Z.

=== The Catloo Corps ===
The Catloo Corps was Marquis Janus' personal army of robotic cat ninjas that first premiered in episode 35. They could give off electric shocks with their tails (which by themselves have enough force to stun humans), had a pair of small missile launchers on their arms, as well as hand-to-hand skills, and were generally used for tasks a typical warrior beast would be too large or obtrusive. For example, in their first appearance they commandeered Boss Borot and had it block off the launch tube for Great Mazinger. As with all the villains' foot soldiers, though, they were no match for the Great Mazinger and the other robots. In episode 37 the Catloo infiltrated the Fortress of Science in a cargo of crates. In episode 48 they demonstrate capabilities of staying underwater for long periods of time, while doing so their missiles are replaced with harpoons.

== From Mazinkaiser ==
=== Lori & Loru ===
Two voluptuous twin sisters who begin working at the institute as lab assistants. Sayaka once jealously dumps Mazinkaiser headfirst in the ocean when she thinks Koji is paying too much attention to them. They're sexy and fanservicey, yet in the time of need they're also smart and brave; they're vital in episode 5, where Lori helps an injured Dr. Yumi to reach the facility in time to fight Ashura, and Loru temporarily takes leadership over to help fend Ashura away until her sister and Dr. Yumi return.

The twin sisters pilot the robot Million Alpha in the Mazinkaiser manga and the movie continuity, in which they die in battle. After escaping Paris they successfully fight of the aerial-beasts but are horribly crushed to death as they attempt to fight Mikeros and General Birdler; with her dying breath, Loru activates Million Alpha's self-destruction mode and causes an explosion that destroys their enemies.

Lori, the younger of the sisters, usually wore light blue clothes, and her older sister Loru usually dressed in pink; their hair color was slightly different, in two shades of blonde, with Lori having lighter hair.

Voice actresses: Akiko Hiramatsu (Loru), Shiho Kikuchi (Lori)

=== Gamia Q ===
The Gamia sisters are three identical blonde haired, blue-eyed Gynoids who are vicious and formidable martial artists who are sent by Ashura to assassinate Koji so that his robot can't stop their next attack. Apart from their agility and strength in hand-to-hand combat, they can use their hair as a cutting weapon. They are commonly referred to as Ashura's daughters, but given their mechanical construction it is unlikely as they are robots.

In the first episode of Shin Mazinger which occurs in medias res, one of the three is shown working alongside Inspector Ankokuji. In the same series, at episode 10, a fourth 'sister', Gamia Q4, appears with the purpose of killing Nishikori Tsubasa. A fifth and final 'sister' appears in episode 11.

Voice actress (for the sisters): Ryoka Yuzuki

== From Shin Mazinger ==
=== Inspector Ankokuji ===
Police inspector initially assigned to watch over Dr. Juzo Kabuto. After the latter dies, he then seems to assume the role of bodyguard for Koji and Shiro Kabuto. While often he is portrayed a comic relief, he is in truth quite adept at both armed and unarmed combat, able to take out a whole group of Baron Ashura's men who had previously surrounded him while he was sleeping.

Voice actor: Atsushi Imaruoka

=== Tsubasa Nishikiori ===
Tsubasa Nishikiori (錦織つばさ, Nishikiori Tsubasa) is a character featured in the works of Go Nagai. Originally appearing in the manga Gakuen Taikutsu Otoko and then seen in Violence Jack, she is later featured as an important character in Shin Mazinger Shougeki! Z Hen. In the first manga she was one of the leaders of the school guerrilla and in the last two works, she is the proprietor of a bathhouse secretly staffed by a group of tough fighters ready to fight at her command. She has also appeared in the manga Susano Oh. Nishikiori Tsubasa appears as a side character in the Golden City story arc in the manga. She is voiced by Miyuki Ichijo. The proprietor of the Kurogane house, hot springs resort, Nishikiori first introduced as a long time friend of Dr. Juuzo Kabuto, creator of Mazinger Z. It is later revealed that she is in fact the former student and apprentice of Juuzo's old partner and later nemesis, Dr. Hell. In Shin Mazinger, it is strongly implied, but never stated outright, that she is Kouji and Shiro's long-absent mother; it is unclear if this is meant to be retroactively true for other continuities as well.

=== Master ===
One of the Kurogane House 5, he is first seen assigned as a bodyguard to Dr. Kabuto. Quiet and reserved (he has not once spoken ever since he was introduced), he is a master swordsman, able to cut enemies down so fast they do not even notice. His sword skill is rivaled only by his skill as the chef of the Kurogane house. He wields a katana made from Super Alloy Z.

=== Cross ===
The muscle of the Kurogane house, Cross is easily identified by the cross shaped scar on his face. His strength is such that he is able to match up with Baron Ashura (who was previously shown to be able to take on Mazinger Z bare handed). His strength is revealed to be due to the fact that under his skin, he is actually a cyborg made from Super Alloy Z. This character, like Nishikiori Tsubasa, originated from Violence Jack.

Voice actor: Tessho Genda

=== Yasu the Weasel ===
An expert with explosives who works at the Kurogane house. He is the most talkative of the five and is often seen with the young Shiro and Inspector Ankokuji. He works as a bath attendant in the Kurogane house. His secret weapon is the fact that he has a Photon Power bomb inside him, which, should the time come, he may detonate at the cost of his life.

=== Django ===
A gunman, easily identified by his Mexican sombrero and poncho, he carries multiple weapons with him at all times. He serves as the driver for the Kurogane house and regularly picks up guests from the airport. He drives a special VW van which can split into two parts at the press of a button which he usually uses to dump troublesome guests in the back of a cliff. He has been given special Super alloy Z bullets for his revolver by Nishikiori - while he only has a limited number of these, they are so strong that the bullets can be handloaded and reused again after having been fired. The basis for Django is from the character of the same name from the Sergio Corbucci film from 1966, and in an early episode you can see the anime's character dragging around a coffin with his giant gun in it just like the old gunslinger.

=== Kikunosuke ===
Head waitress of the Kurogane house, while she appears as a frail old woman, her skill is such she is respected by the other members of the Kurogane House 5. In episode 9 of Shin Mazinger, Nishikiori tells Koji that he may only go to Bardos Island if he is able to rub Kikunosuke's back, however her skill is such that Koji is unable to do so. She wields a garrote wire made from Super Alloy Z.

== From Grendizer ==
=== Blacky ===
Voiced by: Kenichi Ogata, Voiced by: Wataru Takagi (Grendizer U)

Blacky (ブラッキー隊長, Burakkī Taichō), sometimes called Colonel Blacky or Commander Blacky, first appears as the leader of the Vegan invasion of Earth, but is soon revealed to be under the orders of King Vega and General Gandal. Blacky is the mastermind of the Vegan attacks during the series' first season and is repeatedly chastised by Gandal for his failures to defeat Grendizer. His main strategy is to employ brute force and send one saucer beast after another against Grendizer, without much success. On some occasions, Blacky does not hesitate to betray Vegan officers whose success against Grendizer could put his own position in jeopardy. His base consists of a large pink saucer called the Motherburn which is used to store saucer beasts, minifos, and midifos and usually remains on the far side of the Moon. Although it is armed with missiles and lasers it was rarely used in battle.

=== Duke Fleed ===
Voiced by: Kei Tomiyama (1975), Voiced by: Miyu Irino (Grendizer U)

Duke Fleed (デューク・フリード, Dyūku Furīdo) is the Crown Prince and one of the few survivors of Planet Fleed, which was destroyed by the forces of King Vega. He has found a new home on planet Earth and vowed to protect his new homeland and take revenge on King Vega and his minions. With the super robot Grendizer at his command, Duke Fleed fights back invasion after invasion in the 74 episodes of the UFO Robo Grendizer series, with the help of former Mazinger Z pilot Koji Kabuto, who serves as his sidekick.

Duke Fleed's Earth name is Daisuke Umon (宇門大介, Umon Daisuke). He purports to be a normal human and his cover is that of the son of Professor Umon, head of the Space Science Lab. He works as an employee of farmer Danbei Makiba. At first Makiba, his teenage daughter Hikaru and young son Goro know nothing of Daisuke's secret identity and nature as an alien prince. Makiba, a hot-tempered source of comic relief, just bullies Daisuke to get on with his work (which he frequently neglects in order to go and fight Vegans) and sees him as not good enough for his daughter who is enamoured with the young man. However, various incidents lead them to discover who he really is.

In the U.S. release of the show, Duke Fleed is instead called "Orion Quest" and uses the name "Johnny Bryant" while on Earth.

=== Gandal ===
Voiced by: Kōsei Tomita (1975), Voiced by: Takehito Koyasu (Grendizer U)

Under the orders of King Vega, General Gandal is in charge of the invasion of Earth by the Vegan empire, but lets his right-hand man Blaki do much of the dirty work during the show's first season.

Gandal's unusual feature is that his body is a host to a feminine creature known as Lady Gandal, hidden away within his head. In the show's first season, his face actually splits and the left and right halves swing open to show the diminutive figure of Lady Gandal inside. After Gandal is wounded in episode 27, Lady Gandal appears in a different way: her face replaces Gandal's when she speaks and she sometimes takes control of their common body. This is a similar masculine-feminine duality to the one seen in Baron Ashura, another Go Nagai villain, but unlike Ashura's feminine and masculine sides, Gandal and Lady Gandal have two distinct personalities.

Gandal is a brutal and scheming military man, but not particularly imaginative and extremely loyal to King Vega. Lady Gandal is sometimes depicted as more cunning and ruthless than him. After too many defeats against Grendizer, Gandal is forced by King Vega to share power with Minister Zurill.

In the show's last episode, Gandal fights against Grendizer using his own robot. After he fails, narrowly escaping with his life, Lady Gandal becomes frustrated and takes control of his body, in an attempt to murder King Vega and then propose a truce to planet Earth. Gandal retakes control of the body and shoots himself in the face, killing Lady Gandal. Though wounded, Gandal then goes to fight Grendizer again, only to die in battle.

In France and in the province of Quebec, Canada he is named Minos.

=== King Vega ===
Voiced by: Jōji Yanami

King Vega is the absolute and ruthless ruler of planet Vega. He first approached planet Fleed with apparently benevolent intentions and his daughter, Princess Rubina, was to marry Duke Fleed, the crown prince of Fleed. But the Vegan forces then turned against Fleed, destroying it. Only Duke Fleed and his sister Maria Grace escaped. Duke Fleed relocated to Earth and used his super robot Grendizer to save his new homeworld from the Vegan forces.

King Vega first followed from his homeworld the struggle of his army against Grendizer. In the last part of the series, planet Vega was destroyed by a natural disaster and King Vega left much of its citizens to die. Relocating to his base on Earth's moon, King Vega personally directed the struggle to invade Earth, only to be thwarted over and over by Duke Fleed. King Vega died in the series' final episode when Grendizer destroyed his mothership.

=== Zurill ===
Voiced by: Takashi Tanaka, Voiced by: Tomokazu Seki (Grendizer U)

Minister Zurill is a cunning and ruthless scientist, who favors elaborate plans over the use of brute force, but he is no more successful in defeating Duke Fleed and Grendizer than Blacky and Gandal. Every time he thinks he has found a weakness in Grendizer and seeks to exploit it, Duke Fleed's ally Dr. Umon has found a counter-measure.

Unlike Blacky he is not merely General Gandal's subordinate but an equal. Also unlike Blacky he does not acquire his battleship, the Warrior Mothership, right away. Both men are often in conflict over tactics, though they secretly unite against the Emperor's latest favorite, who has developed even more efficient type of giant robots to fight Grendizer called the Vega Monsters. After killing him, Zurill and Gandal adopt his new methods of producing giant robots: in this case cyborg-like creatures combining elements of animals and technology.

In Episode 69, Zurill's own son comes to his rescue, sacrificing his own life to allow his father to escape Grendizer unharmed. Zuril appears sincerely devastated by the loss of his child, as shown by his abundant tears and despair, and proving that even Vegans have a heart and care for their children in spite of their ruthlessness. Zurill comes back two last times in episodes 71 and 72, now showing extreme coldness and resignation after his child's death.

In episode 72 Zurill is revealed to be a rival to Duke Fleed for the affection of King Vega's daughter, Princess Rubina. He therefore goes directly in battle against Grendizer and tries to murder Duke Fleed, only to be shot by Koji Kabuto.

In the manga version, Zurill is a more complex figure than in the anime. He aims at creating a benevolent dictatorship on colonized Earth in order to save the planet from pollution and war, and he is actually shocked to find out that King Vega intends to exterminate mankind; at the end of the story, Zurill survives and vows to redeem himself after contemplating an aurora.

In France and in the province of Quebec, Canada he is named Horos.
