= Mazinkaiser =

Original video animation

- Cover for the Blu-ray box set

マジンカイザー (Majinkaizā)
- Genre: Mecha
- Created by: Go Nagai
- Original video animation
- Directed by: Masahiko Murata
- Written by: Shinzo Fujita
- Music by: Kazuo Nobuta; Yogo Kono
- Studio: Brain's Base
- Licensed by: NA: Discotek Media
- Released: September 25, 2001 – September 25, 2002
- Runtime: 30 minutes
- Episodes: 7
- Anime film

Mazinkaiser vs. Shogun of Darkness
- Directed by: Masahiko Murata
- Written by: Satoru Nishizono
- Music by: Kazuo Nobuta
- Studio: Brain's Base
- Licensed by: NA: Discotek Media
- Released: July 25, 2003
- Runtime: 65 minutes

Mazinkaiser (マジンカイザー, Majinkaizā) is a Japanese anime OVA produced by Brain's Base and Dynamic Productions, based on the Mazinkaiser design that debuted in Super Robot Wars games and the original Mazinger Z manga by Go Nagai. The OVA follows Kouji Kabuto, Tetsuya Tsurugi and the rest of the "Mazinger Team" as they fight against Dr. Hell's Mechanical Beasts while Kouji stumbles upon a forgotten laboratory where he finds Mazinkaiser, the most powerful robot ever built. The series chronicles Kouji's experience with the machine as he copes with Kaiser's power while defeating Dr. Hell's forces.

The OVA series was directed by Masahiko Murata (Jinki: Extend, Corpse Princess) and written by Satoru Nishizono and Shinzo Fujita. It was first released on Japan through Home Video from September 25, 2001, to September 25, 2002, with a total of 7 episodes. An epilogue movie titled Mazinkaiser vs. The Great General of Darkness was released in theaters on July 25, 2003. Mazinkaiser emulates Go Nagai's character designs, and its operatic plot is supported by a "tongue-in-cheek" cynicism in regard to the gratuitous sex and violence. Some of the episodes draw their plot elements from the manga itself rather than the TV series. ADV Films once licensed the series in English territories until the company's closure in 2009.

== Plot ==
In the 2001 OVA Mazinkaiser, Tetsuya fights alongside Kouji against Doctor Hell's forces. The OVA version of Great Mazinger is physically identical to the original, but with black coloring on the arms and legs instead of blue. Great is seriously damaged during the initial battle in the series. It became worse when the captured Mazinger Z attacks the Photon Power Labs even though Tetsuya does his best to defend the lab against Mazinger Z. Lastly, the rampaging Mazinkaiser leaves him badly injured while Great Mazinger is a complete wreck. Consequently, he leaves together with Jun to get treated for his injuries.

Near the end of the OVA, Tetsuya returns with a new and much more powerful Great, which is discovered in Doctor Juzo Kabuto's laboratory. This is said to be the real Great Mazinger (or "Shin Great Mazinger"). The "true" Great is structurally the same as the earlier version, but the color scheme for the forearms and legs is blue, as in the original 70's version. It is explained that the Great Mazinger made by Doctor Kenzo Kabuto (Kouji's father) is the prototype version seen in the early episodes, whereas Doctor Juzo Kabuto (Kouji's grandfather), who secretly works in an underground laboratory, managed to finish the final version of Great Mazinger. With a tremendous power compared to the prototype version, Tetsuya asked Kouji to confront Dr. Hell in Bardos Island. Kouji, without knowing the true Shin Great Mazinger, was worried and asked Tetsuya if he can handle an entire army of super robots. However, having the confidence with Shin Great Mazinger, Tetusya scolds Kouji of his cockiness. Therefore, Kouji flies off to fight Dr. Hell leaving Tetsuya against an entire army of mechanical beasts. Consequently, Shin Great Mazinger defeated the entire army of Doctor Hell including the possessed Venus Ace (although most of the battle was not shown). After the battle without damage, Great Mazinger decided to find and help Kouji in the Floating Fortress of Dr. Hell. The concept of Shin Great Mazinger is to bring Great Mazinger to the ranks of modern and more powerful robots such as Mazinkaiser and Shin Getter Robo.

== List of episodes ==
Episode 1: A Fierce Fight! Double Mazingers: Baron Ashura attacks Japan with an army of Mechanical Beasts, but is met head on by Kouji Kabuto and Mazinger Z. Ashura's forces manage to get the upper hand, and despite the arrival of Great Mazinger, Boss Borot and Aphrodite A, Mazinger Z is disabled and Kouji hurled to parts unknown. Dr. Hell quickly modifies Mazinger Z into the Ashura Mazinger and launches an attack on the Photon Power Lab. Despite Great being damaged, Tetsuya Tsurugi attempts a valiant defense but is overwhelmed. Before he can be killed by a gloating Ashura, a mystery robot wipes out the entire attacking Mechanical Beast army with one shot. Overpowering Ashura Mazinger easily, the mystery robot begins attacking the Lab and Great!

Episode 2: A Descending, Malevolent Deity: Great Mazinger attempts to battle the mystery robot, but is easily swept aside. Just as the machine begins to power up its heat sinks, Sayaka arrives and begs the pilot to stop. Kouji later awakens in bed, having little recollection of piloting Mazinkaiser to the rescue and attacking the lab himself. He describes how he was brought to a cave he found Mazinkaiser, the final creation of his grandfather. Unfortunately, Mazinkaiser taps into the pilot's mind and is so powerful Kouji is overwhelmed and unable to use its power effectively, or even safely. Because of this, when Ashura uses the aerial fortress Gool and to attack a nearby city Great Mazinger, Aphrodite A and Boss Borot are dispatched while Kouji helplessly fumes back in the lab. Predictably, the three heroes are no match for the Mechanical Beast onslaught. When Kouji arrives, Ashura captures Sayaka and threatens to kill her if he does not surrender Mazinkaiser. Kouji separates the Kaiser Pilder from Kaiser itself, but as it is being loaded onto the ship the Great Booster arrives and cuts the chains, sending Ashura's forces into disarray as it barrels through them. Taking advantage, Kouji quickly yells "Pilder ON!" and brings Mazinkaiser to life. After a short but sharp battle, Ashura is sent packing. Tetsuya decides to leave with Jun to give his wounds time to heal and entrust the safety of Japan to Kouji.

Episode 3: Kouji Assassination Order!: Enraged with the appearance of Mazinkaiser, Dr. Hell is furious with Baron Ashura. However, the wily henchman informs his master that he has already dispatched his three cute daughters to deal with Kouji, since without Kouji to pilot it Mazinkaiser is useless. Ashura's daughters attack Boss by mistake, prompting Dr. Yumi and Sayaka to forbid Kouji from leaving the Lab until the situation changes. Hot-headed as ever, Kouji sneaks out anyway and battles the three daughters of Ashura, who turn out to be killer androids. He defeats them just in time to rescue Sayaka and Boss from a Mechanical Beast. The episode finishes with the introduction of Lori and Loru, two busty American sisters who are Dr. Yumi's assistants. This episode introduces the Mazinkaiser version of Venus A, piloted by Sayaka instead of Jun.

Episode 4: Sayaka Rescue Operation: On a day at the beach, Ashura kidnaps Sayaka and threatens to publicly humiliate her by cutting off her swimsuit if Kouji and Mazinkaiser do not surrender. Kouji is brought aboard the submarine Salude, but manages to escape and rescue Sayaka with Boss' help. Venus and Mazinkaiser make short work of the submarine. This episode is famous for its crude sexual humour and fan service nudity.

Episode 5: A Narrow Escape! The Photon Power Lab: Dr. Hell is fast losing patience with Ashura's failures, prompting the half-male, half-female villain to carry out a desperate plot. He attacks Dr. Yumi as he and Lori are travelling back to the Photon Power Lab and then disguises himself as the doctor. Unfortunately, he had no way of knowing it was the doctor's birthday and so was caught off-guard. Eventually losing patience, he attacks the Lab and is repelled. Dr. Hell angrily has him imprisoned and resolves to deal with Mazinkaiser himself. In the course of the episode Dr. Hell chances upon a group of more powerful, partly organic giants (Mykene Warrior Beasts) which he utilizes in place of the previous mechanical monsters. This episode is notable for having a disturbing shower scene with Ashura.

Episode 6: Kouji Kabuto Dies in Magma!: Dr. Hell launches a full-scale assault on the Photon Power Lab, using the Ghost Mechanical Beast Drago Omega 1 to infect Venus A and turn it against them. His attack is followed up by a ground assault that successfully captures Kouji and the others. Boss and Boss Borot distract the enemy long enough for Kouji to reach and activate Mazinkaiser, but shortly thereafter Kouji is taken by surprise by the Combined Mechanical Beast (Gattai Kikaijuu), Garadabura MK01. Unable to effectively combat the flight-capable Mechanical Beast, Kouji and Mazinkaiser are dumped into an active Mount Fuji.

Episode 7: A Decisive Battle!! Flaming Hell Castle!: After Mazinkaiser is dumped into Mount Fuji by the Combined Mechanical Beast, it pursues Boss, Sayaka and the other members of the Photon Power Lab. Before it can kill them it is struck by a massive lightning strike: the Great Hero, Great Mazinger has returned! While Great battles the Mechanical Beasts, Jun arrives and takes the group to the hidden fortress where Kouji discovered Mazinkaiser. She explains that she and Tetsuya discovered and explored the base, uncovering another Great Mazinger. This Great is far more powerful than the one Tetsuya piloted in the previous episodes and is described as Shin Great Mazinger (New Great Mazinger). The original Great Mazinger was the prototype version made by Dr. Kenzo Kabuto. At that time, Dr. Juzo Kabuto, thought to be dead, was secretly making the final version of Great Mazinger in his underground laboratory. He was also able to finish Mazinkaiser as his ultimate masterpiece. They also uncovered the Kaiser Scrander, the wings of Mazinkaiser. Unknown to the unconscious Koji at Mt. Fuji, his Pilder has activated an automatic homing signal, which will activate the Kaiser Scrander. Diving into Mount Fuji, the Scrander docks with Mazinkaiser and the now complete Mazinkaiser emerges from the volcano. After briefly assisting Great, Kouji decides to attack Dr. Hell's base, which was uncovered when he launched his entire Mechanical Beast army. Great Mazinger faces the Mechanical Beast horde as Kouji arrives on Dr. Hell's island and is confronted by Baron Ashura, now rebuilt into a Mechanical Beast. After a long and difficult battle, Kouji emerges triumphant thanks to Mazinkaiser's Final Blade and thoughts of his friends and family. Dr. Hell attempts to win Kouji over to his side and when the hero refuses activates the island's self-destruct sequence. Unluckily for the villain, his escape craft is caught in the explosions as well, while Mazinkaiser emerges unharmed from the inferno.

== Mazinkaiser VS the Great General of Darkness ==
The OVA's success prompted the studio to release in 2003 Mazinkaiser VS the Great General of Darkness (マジンカイザー死闘! 暗黒大将軍, Majinkaizā Shitō! Ankoku Daishōgun; lit. 'The Death of Mazinkaiser! The Great Shogun of Darkness'), a remake of 1974's Mazinger Z vs. The Great General of Darkness. The new Mazinger Team is overwhelmed by the surprise assault of the subterranean Mykene empire, resulting in many casualties, but Mazinkaiser ultimately defeats the forces of evil, ending with a bitter duel against the leader of Mykene, the Great Shogun of Darkness.

== See also ==
- Mazinkaizer SKL
