= Koji Kabuto =

Koji Kabuto 兜甲児
- Mazinger character
- Koji Kabuto as illustrated by Go Nagai alongside Mazinger Z
- First appearance: Mazinger Z episode 1: "Birth of the Wondrous Robot"
- Created by: Go Nagai
- Voiced by: Hiroya Ishimaru (Mazinger Z through Mazinkaiser, SRW); Dando Kleuver (M&M Productions English Dub); Kappei Yamaguchi (CB Chara Nagai Go World); Kenji Akabane (Shin, Iron Saga); Showtaro Morikubo (Infinity); Hiro Shimono (Grendizer U); Robert Newell (Mazinkaiser, English); A.J. Beckles (Mazinkaiser vs. The Great General of Darkness, English); Wayne Grayson (Infinity, English)

Koji Kabuto (Japanese: 兜甲児, Hepburn: Kabuto Kōji), also written Kouji Kabuto, is a fictional character featuring introduced Go Nagai's manga Mazinger Z. He is the main character and pilot of title super robot using its powers to defeat the forces from Dr. Hell. He makes a comeback in the sequel series Great Mazinger following his defeat in the original series. He also features in Grendizer as Duke Fleed's friend and sidekick as well alternate takes of Mazinger Z franchise.

Go Nagai created Koji Kabuto in order to appeal to children in regards to his anti-heroic traits. His usage of a robot was meant to add fun to the concept of how fun can be robots if a child is behind it. Multiple voice actors provided their talent for Koji' character. While Koji is notable for being the first pilot of a super robot in anime history, critical reception to his character has been mixed due to his hotheaded personality and poor relationship with the heroine, Sayaka Yumi, in the anime series.

== Creation and development ==
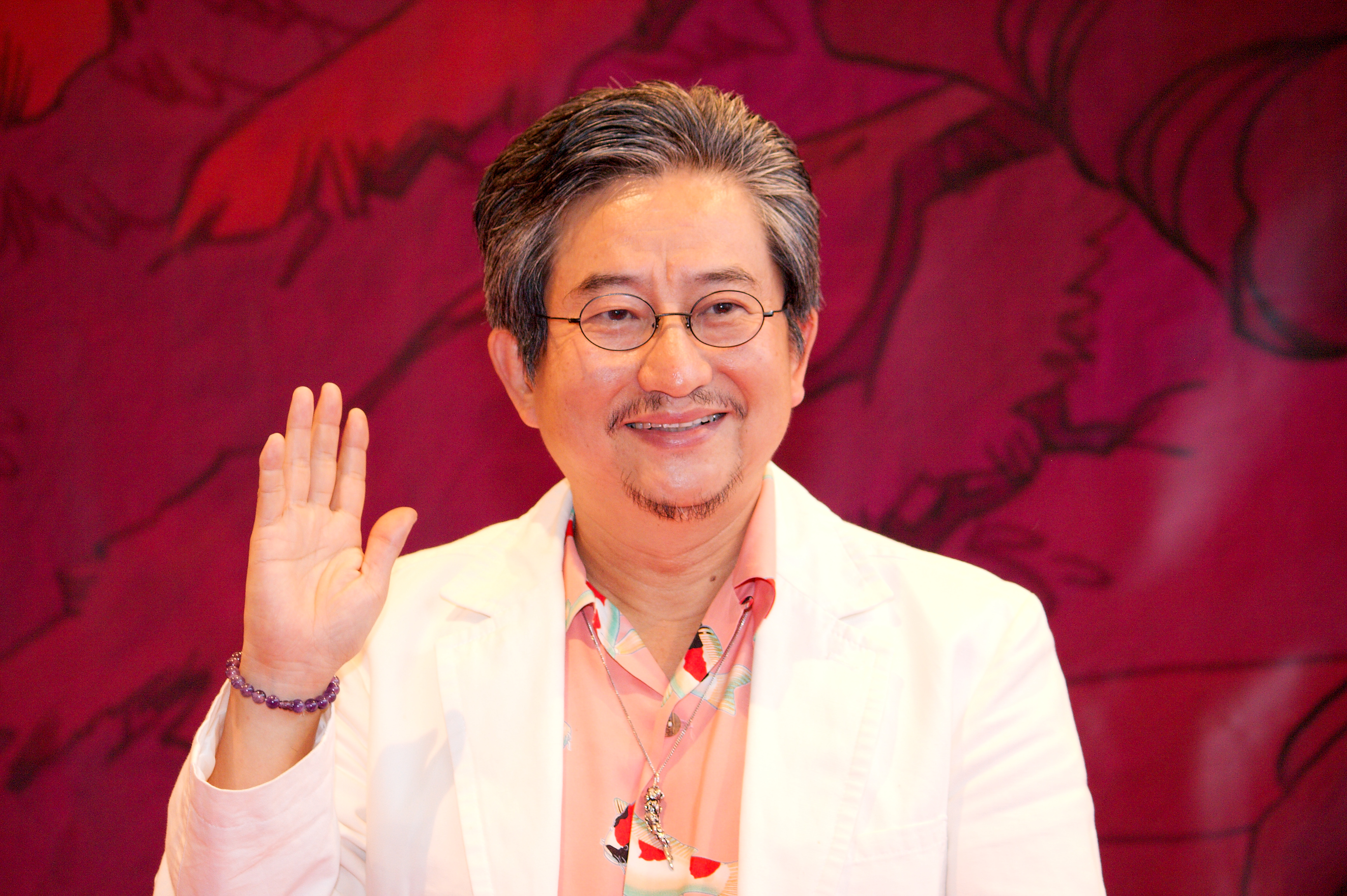
Manga author Go Nagai created Koji Kabuto.

Go Nagai created Koji Kabuto to be a strong willed protagonist who would be able to control the power of Mazinger Z knowing the consequences of such might. Nagai feels that this message of cautious power was particularly influenced by two of his earlier works, Demon Lord Dante and Devilman. His antisocial personality was made to be something children would look after but parents would disapprove. Koji was influenced by Yasohachi Yamagishi from Harenchi Gakuen but with a sense of calmness and strength. As a result, Nagai made him a delinquent most notably noted when the character is rude towards Sayaka Yumi and feels bad for his actions.

According to Nagai, he had the idea for piloting a robot from watching frustrated drivers in a traffic jam, imagining a car that could sprout arms and legs and walk over the other vehicles. According to Nagai the concept of Mazinger Z was: ""I didn't equate giant robots with weapons, I wanted to give a teenaged character a suit of armor that would turn him into a hero." In retrospective, Nagai felt Koji was simpler than modern mecha pilots who possessed complex characterizations. Nevertheless, he claimed he only wanted to give to the younger audience fun through his own usage of Mazinger Z. Mazinger Z's constant defeats were the result of Nagai wanting to use more redesigns for the mecha. Koji Kabuto's father was not shown in the story when Nagai started planning ideas to see what he could do if the series became popular.

When making Grendizer, Nagai only intended the protagonist to be Duke Fleed. However, Nagai was asked to put Koji too, resulting in the series to have two protagonists. Producer Toshio Katsuta felt pressure with this concept and thus turned Koji into a subordinate character. He claimed he apologized to Koji's fans for doing this to the character. Nagai believes that thanks to this character Duke Fleed ended up coming across as more mature. Katsuta claimed he wanted Koji to be "a cheerful boy, lively and passionate acting without reasoning" in contrast to the serious personality of Fleed.

For the film Infinity, the staff brought back Koji as the lead with the intention of giving him a character arc where becomes closer with the rest members from the cast.

Koji's voice actor is Hiroya Ishimaru in the Japanese version of Mazinger Z and Mazinkaiser. In the English version of Mazinkaiser, his voice actor is Robert Newell. In the gaming industry, Kabuto is considered one of the stalwarts of the Japanese-exclusive strategy game series Super Robot Wars and appears in nearly every incarnation. In Shin Mazinger Shougeki! Z Hen, his voice is played by Kenji Akabane.

== Appearances ==
=== Mazinger Z ===
In his first appearances in both manga and anime versions of Mazinger Z, Kabuto is originally an average high school student whose only apparent skill is driving motorcycles. He lives with his brother Shiro and his grandfather Juuzo, as his parents are both deceased (although a few years later Koji's father, Kenzo Kabuto, turns out to be still alive).

Juuzo Kabuto, Koji's granddad, is killed in the very first episode, but before he dies he assigns Koji the task of piloting the Mazinger Z robot, to battle against Dr Hell's historical robot army. Initially, Koji is grossly incapable of operating Mazinger Z properly. Eventually, Sayaka Yumi (Yumi Sayaka) makes her appearance, at the head of her own giant (female) robot Aphrodite A, which she uses to restrain Mazinger Z.

Koji Kabuto's character evolves during the whole Mazinger series. From a seemingly mindless, reckless, boyish scoundrel, he gradually develops into a fighter who's up to match his opponent's ever greater challenges, showing a growing sense of duty, and a courage to fight to his death, or close to that. When things are at their bleakest, he pulls through by virtue of his unyielding will. The presumably indestructible "Japanium" metal alloy actually fails, episode after episode, to live up to its developer's expectations, and Koji's undying bravery stands out in sharp contrast to Mazinger's alleged invulnerability as the sole barrier to evil forces, even beyond Mazinger's eventual destruction.

Kabuto's intelligence also seems to mature through the years. Mazinger's pilot becomes an expert fighter smash after smash. The man who joins Tetsuya Tsurugi in the final battle against the Mycenaean Empire is far from the mindless motorcycle-riding overgrown brat he used to be. But it is in the Grendizer series that Koji shows off the quality of his brain power, when he introduces the mini saucer he himself designed during his study period at NASA. This is in fact little more than a posh gizmo equipped with a pair of missiles, and clearly unfit for combat. But Koji doesn't hesitate to use it to face an army of evil aliens, or die trying.

In the Mazinger Z Infinity feature film, which renders the Grendizer story as Non-canon in the terms of the TV series of Mazinger Z, Koji spends the next 10 years of his life after the fall of Mycea as a scientist much like both his father and grandfather, eventually returning to Mazinger Z to fight one last battle against Dr Hell and his armies over a new, seemingly all-powerful Mazinger.

Koji's most famous trait (and indeed, his legacy) is his yelling out Mazinger's weapon names in battle. Whether this is dictated by the machine's programming and is complementary to pressing the buttons, or just originated from a whim of Nagai's, has never been fully ascertained. The effect on kids was devastating. Kabuto's most famous battlecries, "Rocket Punch!", and "Breast Fire!" among others, are well known in Japan, and elsewhere, even by people who have never watched Mazinger Z. Almost all super robots, whether designed by Nagai or not, have stolen this feature from Koji Kabuto and his Mazinger.

=== Grendizer ===
In the second Mazinger-Z spinoff Grendizer, Koji is reduced to being a sidekick to the series' main hero Duke Fleed - a long stint that many Mazinger Z Japanese fans did not appreciate. For much of the early series of Grendizer, giant enemy robots are left to Duke Fleed to destroy. On numerous occasions, Duke Fleed has to rescue Koji, who ends up being injured or gets his puny saucer miserably wrecked. When this saucer gets destroyed once and for all, Koji designs a more powerful aircraft called the Double Spazer which gives him a much more active role in battle.

=== Mazinkaiser ===
In the modern Mazinkaiser, Koji returns again to pilot Mazinger Z, alongside Tetsuya with his Great Mazinger. Mazinger Z was captured and was transformed by Dr. Hell to be an evil robot bent on destroying the world. Koji was redirected by his Hover Pilder to find Mazinkaiser and saves Great Mazinger, the Photonic institute, and eventually almost destroying Mazinger Z.

=== Shin Mazinger Shogeki! Z Hen ===
In Shin Mazinger, which is considered a "reboot" of the Mazinger storyline, Kouji is very similar to his classic counterpart. Just as in the original anime, and manga, Kouji lives with his younger brother, Shiro, and his grandfather, Juuzou. As with the original series, Kouji is given Mazinger Z by Juuzou, but is also briefly instructed by him, and trained how to use it during his first battle with Dr. Hell's forces, before Juuzou dies from a serious wound he gained before meeting up with Kouji, Shiro, and Inspector Ankokuji, in the Pilder. Although he is as "hot-blooded" and determined to do good, Kouji is shown to be more aggressive at times in Shin Mazinger, compared to his earlier appearances. He has a tendency of often letting his emotions get the best of him (such as when Shiro is captured by Boss's gang, causing Kouji to violently beat Boss, and later after Juuzou's death, which causes him to chase Baron Ashura down in Mazinger Z, nearly crushing him, and then causing him to attack Sayaka and her Aphrodite A with the Breast Fire attack). In the first episode of the series, which is referred to as being the "finale" of the story, Kouji faces off against the Ankoku Daishogun, and the forces of Dr. Hell, before being forced to take on Dr. Hell's entire Army on his own, for the sake of his comrades.

== Other versions ==
- In Tranzor Z Koji was named Tommy Davis, which was somewhat confusing as he was unrelated to the counterparts of Sayaka Yumi and her father, whose last names were also Davis. His voice actor is Gregg Berger in the dub.
- When Grendizer was shown in the United States as part of Force Five, Koji's name was Lance Hyatt.
- Italian translators never identified Kabuto as the same character in Grendizer and in the Mazinger series. In the Italian version of Grendizer (broadcast for first in Italy), Koji was called Alcor; in Mazinger Z, Ryo Kabuto; in Great Mazinger, Koji Kabuto. As a result, many in Italy thought that the heroes of Japanese cartoons all looked alike. In the Italian version of Mazinkaiser, he was called Koji Kabuto again.
- The same confusion took place in France: he was called Alcor in the French version of Grendizer (from which the Italian one was taken), and Koji in the French version of Mazinger Z (which was broadcast much later in France).
- The same kind of confusion took place in Arabic speaking nations: While he was still called Koji in the Arabic version of Grendizer, he was called Maher in the Arabic version of Mazinger Z that was translated after Grendizer's success in the Middle East.

== Reception ==
Critics for anime, manga and other media commented on Koji Kabuto ever since his debut. Koji is noteworthy being the first mecha pilot in anime history. Anime News Network referred to him as a "righteous idiot" due to his heroic yet simplistic personality. The reviewer also expressed criticism towards him misrelationship to Sayaka for coming across as sexist. Nevertheless, he found that the misrelationship evolves across the narrative. In retrospective, The Fandom Post acclaimed how Nagai and Toei developed Koji as one of the first mecha pilots in anime history but, like ANN, felt that his personality was too rude, sexist and often fell into the villain's traps in most episodes. In another review, the site still felt Koji was condescending to Sayaka and most of his friends while still praising his fights against Dr. Hell. Guioteca referred to Koji as too proud and sexist based on his misrelationship with Sayaka. Nevertheless, the site noted that Koji's character made the series a success based on how he was one of the earliest mecha pilots, especially in South America, where the Mazinger Z anime was broadcast in the 1980s. While the misrelationship between Koji and Sayaka was seen as sexist by multiple writers, the site noted that it was still famous due to how the latter stood up against Koji, something that appealed to a bigger audience.

In regards to the OVAs from Mazinkaiser, ANN praised the fights in the robots Koji pilots as well as his English actor due to his constant yells done when executing an attack from his robots. DVDTalk enjoyed Koji's actions in the first two episodes due to how overthetop are his actions when fighting and discovering the new Mazinkaiser. The site found strange how in later episodes, the series focuses on a more comical take on Koji and Sayaka's relationship which comes across as fanservice due to the set up of a beach episode. Mania Entertainment enjoyed the fights between the robots and found the story escalates quickly when Koji is defeated in the first episode by the enemy and goes missing-in-action until he comes back with the stronger Mazinkaiser. In contrast to DVDTalk, Mania Entertainment enjoyed the handling of Koji and Sayaka due to both of them coming across as tsunderes since in the beach episode it was clear the two had feelings for each other. Mania Entertainment further enjoyed how in the later episodes, Koji and Tetsuya fight together in a proper fashion using their robots against Dr. Hell, making a proper homage to the Mazinger Z series.

ANN criticized Koji's characterization in Infinity for coming across as "angsty" during the times the plot handles elements of who should keep fighting for humanity while discussing the idea of a weak society compared by the reviewer to a TV drama. IGN found the adult Koji too different from the original one as he now takes more after his grandfather. IGN liked how the film did not solely focus on Koji's return to fight Dr. Hell as it allowed more cast members to integrated to the main story in the process. Fandom Post praised how the film does a good job at introducing Koji's character. In regards to his encounter with his nemesis Dr. Hell, the site appreciated how well developed as the protagonist and his allies creates a new Mazinger Z, largely superior than the original. Forbes found Koji's role in the whole formulaic due to how he is first defeated in the movie and returns with a stronger robot in the climax, something which Otaku USA agreed since he felt the narrative tried to give Koji further depths yet his actions were easily foreseen by the writer.
