= God Mazinger =

Television series

- ゴッドマジンガー
- Genre: Adventure, fantasy, mecha
- Creator: Go Nagai
- Director: Yoshio Hayakawa
- Series composition: Hiroyuki Onoda
- Music: Kentarō Haneda
- Country of origin: Japan
- Original language: Japanese
- No. of episodes: 23

Production
- Producers: Norio Hatsukawa; Shunzo Kato
- Production companies: Tokyo Movie Shinsha

Original release
- Network: NTV
- Release: April 15 – September 30, 1984

Related
- Novel series
- Written by: Yasutaka Nagai (1, 4, 7, 10); Tatsuhiko Dan (2, 5, 8); Hideki Sonoda (3, 6, 9)
- Illustrated by: Go Nagai
- Published by: Kadokawa Shoten
- Imprint: Kadokawa Bunko
- Original run: March 1984 – December 1984
- Volumes: 10
- Manga

Mazin Legend
- Written by: Go Nagai
- Published by: Shogakukan
- Magazine: Shōnen Big Comic
- Original run: May 1984 – February 1985
- Volumes: 4

God Mazinger (Japanese: ゴッドマジンガー, Hepburn: Goddo Majingā), also known as Mazin Legend (Japanese: 魔神伝説, Hepburn: Majin Densetsu), is a Japanese multimedia franchise created by Go Nagai, mainly consisting of an anime television series, a manga series and a novel series. The anime aired for 23 episodes from April 15 to September 30, 1984, on Nippon Television. It is given the international title Space Adventure: The Deity on the official TMS website. The manga series was originally published in tankōbon format by Shogakukan in four volumes in 1984. The novelization was published in 1984 and lasted 10 volumes. The three of them share the same basic premise but have a different story.

== Plot ==
A Japanese teen named Yamato Hino, a young sports enthusiast, during a quiet and ordinary day begins to feel strange calls from an indefinite dimension. Frightened and confused, the boy thinks that he had hallucinations but during a thunderstorm a lightning bolt drags him into a parallel world: the ancient kingdom of Mu, ruled by King Muraji whose concern is to defend the capital of his kingdom, attacked by monsters commanded by the evil Dorado of the Empire of Dinosaurs.

In the kingdom of Mu, a legend tells of a titanic being that stands ready to defend the population from any threat and the king wants to awaken the giant statue of the god Mazinger; to do this he needs a brave boy whose name is Yamato, the only one capable of awakening the mighty giant. The devout prayers of the king and the princess are heard: the boy arrives to the dimension of Mu and the statue suddenly becomes alive. A luminous beam covers the boy that is absorbed into the body of the statue, which begins to move. When the monsters of Dorado broke through the defenses of the kingdom, God Mazinger defeats the dinosaurs and makes the enemy army flee. And thus the legend becomes a reality.

Yamato joins the court of newly crowned Queen Aira Mu, becoming the champion of the Kingdom of Mu, always ready to repel the attacks of the evil Dorado and his fearsome dinosaurs.

== Anime ==
=== Episodes ===
No.	Title	Original release date
1	"Revival of the Legendary Giant"; Transliteration: "yomigaerishi densetsu no kyojin" (Japanese: 蘇りし伝説の巨神)	April 15, 1984
2	"The Chosen One"; Transliteration: "erabareshi mono no sadame" (Japanese: 選ばれし者の定め)	April 22, 1984
3	"The Mystery of the Light-Bearer"; Transliteration: "hikari yadorishi mono no nazo" (Japanese: 光宿りしものの謎)	April 29, 1984
4	"The Secrets of Mazinger"; Transliteration: "mazinger no himitsu" (Japanese: マジンガーの秘密)	May 6, 1984
5	"Raid On Prince Eldo"; Transliteration: "eldo ooji no kishuu" (Japanese: エルド王子の奇襲)	May 13, 1984
6	"Save Aira!"; Transliteration: "aira o sukue!" (Japanese: アイラを救え!)	May 20, 1984
7	"Disappearing Mazinger"; Transliteration: "kieta mazinger" (Japanese: 消えたマジンガー)	May 27, 1984
8	"Hurry! Warrior Yamato"; Transliteration: "isoge! senshi yamato" (Japanese: 急げ! 戦士ヤマト)	June 3, 1984
9	"Dinosaur Factory Found!"; Transliteration: "kyooryuu koojoo hakken!" (Japanese: 恐竜工場発見!)	June 10, 1984
10	"The Amazing Secret"; Transliteration: "osorubeki himitsu" (Japanese: 恐るべき秘密)	June 17, 1984
11	"Aira Captured"; Transliteration: "torawareta aira" (Japanese: とらわれたアイラ)	June 24, 1984
12	"The Deprived Clues"; Transliteration: "ubawareta tegakari" (Japanese: 奪われた手がかり)	July 1, 1984
13	"The Ruined Mazinger"; Transliteration: "ayaushi mazinger" (Japanese: 危うしマジンガー)	July 8, 1984
14	"Fear of the Light-Bearers"; Transliteration: "hikari yadorishi mono no kyoofu" (Japanese: 光宿りしものの恐怖)	July 15, 1984
15	"The Wandering Muu People"; Transliteration: "sasurau muu no tami" (Japanese: さすらうムーの民)	July 22, 1984
16	"The Last of Muraji"; Transliteration: "muraji no saigo" (Japanese: ムラジの最期)	July 29, 1984
17	"Erudo's Secret Base"; Transliteration: "erudo no himitsu kichi" (Japanese: エルドの秘密基地)	August 12, 1984
18	"The Marvelous Ocean Floor"; Transliteration: "kyooi no kaitei kuukan" (Japanese: 驚異の海底空間)	August 26, 1984
19	"The Deadly Ocean Exploration"; Transliteration: "kesshi no kotei tansa" (Japanese: 決死の湖底探査)	September 2, 1984
20	"The Wrath of Dorado"; Transliteration: "dorado no ikari" (Japanese: ドラドの怒り)	September 9, 1984
21	"Yamato vs. Dorado"; Transliteration: "yamato tai dorado!" (Japanese: ヤマト対ドラド!)	September 16, 1984
22	"Yamato Dies?"; Transliteration: "yamato ga Shinda!?" (Japanese: ヤマトが死んだ!?)	September 23, 1984
23	"Yamato vs. Erudo"; Transliteration: "yamato tai erudo" (Japanese: ヤマト対エルド)	September 30, 1984

== Manga ==
The manga, although it shares some similarities and the same premise, differs from the anime with a more mature tone and also has a different conclusion. It was originally published in tankōbon format by Shogakukan in 1984. It was later re-printed by Kadokawa Shoten in 1986, Chuokoron-sha in 1995 and Daitosha in 1998. It was published by Shogakukan and Kadokawa Shoten under the title Mazin Legend and by Chuokoron-sha and Daitosha under the title God Mazinger.

- Shogakukan (Tentomushi Comics)

Date	Vol.	ISBN
May 15, 1984	1	4091490018
June 15, 1984	2	4091490026
August 15, 1984	3	4091490034
September 15, 1984	4	4091490042

- Kadokawa Shoten (Yamato Comics)

Date	Vol.	ISBN
October 7, 1986	1	404921007X
November 7, 1986	2	4049210088
December 7, 1986	3	4049210096

- Chuokoron-sha (Chuko Aizoban)

Date	Vol.	ISBN
September 25, 1995	1	978-4120024771

- Daitosha (St Comics)

Date	Vol.	ISBN
January 5, 1998	1	978-4886531008
January 5, 1998	2	978-4886531016

== Novel ==
The novelization also expands the basic story and has several differences with both the anime and the manga. It was written by Yasutaka Nagai (volumes 1, 4, 7, 10), Tatsuhiko Dan (volumes 2, 5, 8) and Hideki Sonoda (volumes 3, 6, 9), with illustrations by Go Nagai. It was published by Kadokawa Shoten under the label Kadokawa Bunko.

Date	Vol.	Subtitle	ISBN
1984-04	01	蘇る魔神	4041577012
1984-05	02	ヤマト追放	4041577020
1984-06	03	妖魔都市ダイカン	4041577039
1984-07	04	ムー彷徨人	4041577047
1984-07	05	陰謀の王	4041577055
1984-07	06	秘められた神櫃の謎	4041577063
1984-08	07	謎の花姫	4041577071
1984-09	08	魔境の四聖獣	404157708X
1984-11	09	破滅の迷宮	4041577098
1984-12	10	不死鳥大陸	4041577101

== Media ==
=== Home video ===
In Japan, the anime series was released in home video format in the 1980s by the company VAP and it was also released in VHS by Maxam in 2000. The series has also been released in DVD format two times. The first time on June 25, 2003, by Pioneer LDC as a DVD-box set with the full series. The second time, also as a DVD-Box, on March 21, 2007, by Columbia Music Entertainment. US publisher Discotek Media will release the series with English subtitles on SD Blu-ray on January 28, 2020.

=== Soundtracks ===
Two vinyl records were released in Japan by VAP during the 1980s. The first was a single released in April 1984 containing the opening and ending themes The second was an LP album with the full soundtrack, released on September 1, 1984.

Title	Company	Artist	Standard number	Release date
God Mazinger	VAP	Shoko Suda; Harumi Endo	10137-07	1984-04
God Mazinger Original Soundtrack	VAP		30155-23	September 1, 1984

=== Picture books ===
Besides the manga and the novel, some picture books targeted to children were also released in the 1980s. One was published by Hikari no Kuni, another by Shogakukan and the last one by Asahi Sonorama.

=== Appearances in other media ===
Besides its related media, God Mazinger has appeared in other media. The most prominent is its appearance in the "Dynamic Super Robots Taisen" clips that were included at the end of the DVDs of Shin Getter Robot tai Neo Getter Robot. God Mazinger appears alongside Great Mazinger, Venus A, Getter Robot G, Kotetsu Jeeg, Govarian and Groizer X to rescue Mazinger Z and Aphrodite A, but are defeated and in turn saved by Shin Getter Robot and Grendizer just before the arrival of Mazinkaiser.

In the Mazinger Angels manga, there is a saga dedicated to God Mazinger, where Princess Aira appears controlling a female version of God Mazinger and with the help of Jun Hono defeats the enemies of the kingdom, after Jun and the professor accidentally end up in the Kingdom of Mu. It is later with the help of Aira that Venus A becomes Queen of Gold.

== Merchandise ==
A few toys and action figures based in God Mazinger were released by manufacturer Mark.

== Relationship to the Mazinger series ==
The series is considered as part of the Mazinger saga, if not only for the name of the title and that of his creator. In fact, a Japanese book called Mazinger Bible, released in 2002 for the 30th anniversary of the first Mazinger series, includes the God Mazinger, along with other Go Nagai's manga books that have not been made into anime, such as the adult-oriented MazinSaga, Z Mazinger, and First Comics' Mazinger comic book released exclusively for the U.S. market in 1988.

Also, the concept of God Mazinger was a candidate to be the sequel of the original Mazinger Z series but, in the end, the sequel was decided to be the concept of Great Mazinger, and later UFO Robot Grendizer.

== See also ==
- Daimajin, a Japanese tokusatsu franchise with potential influences on God Mazinger
