= Mazinger =

Long-running series of manga and anime

Mazinger (マジンガー, Majingā) is a long-running series of manga and anime featuring giant robots or mecha created by Go Nagai in 1972. It introduced the concept of mecha as robots which are ridden by humans and controlled like vehicles to Japanese science fiction (previous depictions of human-controlled giant robots in Japan, such as in Tetsujin 28-go, depicted the robot as remote-controlled, rather than vehicle-like); it would thereby be a primary source of inspiration for the Super Robot sub-genre, particularly throughout the 1970s.

== Series ==
The series in order:

Mazinger Z (Tranzor Z in the U.S.) (1972)	The first Mazinger, the story revolves around the antagonism between Kouji Kabuto piloting his robot Mazinger Z and Dr. Hell using Mechanical Beasts. Mazinger has two manga, one by Go Nagai himself, and the other by his assistant, Gosaku Ota both with different stories and direction. In 1993, a side-scrolling action video game titled Mazinger Z was released in Japan by Bandai for the Super Famicom gaming console. In 1994, Banpresto released a vertical shoot 'em up coin-op game titled Mazinger Z, which included Mazinger Z, Great Mazinger, and Grendizer, as playable super robot characters.
Great Mazinger (1974)	Directly following the plot of the previous series, Great Mazinger was a more powerful version of its predecessor. Tetsuya Tsurugi pilots the robot against the Mikene Empire and the Warrior Beasts, ruled by the Emperor of Darkness and led by the Great General of Darkness and the Seven Generals of Mikene. Like Mazinger Z, Great Mazinger also has a compiled manga done by Gosaku Ota.
Grendizer (1975)	While not created on Earth, Grendizer is considered to be part of the Mazinger canon mostly due to the fact of Kouji Kabuto co-starring in the show. Within the story, Grendizer was created by scientists of Planet Fleed. After the Vegan Empire invasion of the planet, they stole Grendizer from it, only to be stolen back by the Prince of Planet Fleed, who piloted it under the guise of the masked warrior Duke Fleed. Like Mazinger Z & Great Mazinger, Grendizer also has a compiled manga done by Gosaku Ota.
God Mazinger (1984)	An anime, manga and novel series, loosely based on the Mazinger Z concept. Actually not a mecha but a stone giant. The series is considered as part of the Mazinger saga, if only for the name of the title and that of his creator.
Mazinger U.S.A. Version (1988)	A comic book specifically designed for the United States market. It has an original storyline not related to the other Mazinger series. In this story, this robot is only one of several combat armors that battle in an apocalyptic world and has a completely different arsenal than the other Mazingers. Its design is the most likely the inspiration for the design of Mazinkaiser. It regularly gets confused with the Mazinger of MazinSaga.
MazinSaga (1990)	A manga that mixes the Mazinger Z story with several elements from other series written and drawn in a style more similar to Devilman than to Mazinger. The Mazinger of this manga is a normal-size armor, Mazinger Z, the armor of God. It can grow larger if needed. A video game based on this manga was released for the Sega Genesis / Mega Drive gaming console, titled MazinSaga for the NTSC version, and MazinWars for the PAL version.
Z Mazinger (1998)	Another alternative storyline in manga format, mixing Greek mythology with classic Mazinger characters, where "Z" makes reference to the Greek king of the Gods, Zeus.
Mazinkaiser (2001)	An OVA series featuring one of the most powerful Mazinger; within the Nagai universe it is in line with mecha heavyweights like Grendizer and Shin Getter Robo. Piloted by Koji Kabuto, it faces the classic Mechanical Beasts created by Dr. Hell and afterwards the Warrior Beasts from the Mikene Empire.
Panda-Z (2004)	Short TV anime parodying Mazinger Z.
Mazinger Angels (2004)	An original manga featuring the female characters and mechas from Mazinger Z, Great Mazinger and Grendizer as well as several references to other Nagai's series. It follows a similar premise to Charlie's Angels.
Mazinger Angels Z (2007)	Sequel of Mazinger Angels, it introduces Kikunosuke, from The Abashiri Family, as the pilot of the original design for Mazinger Z (Energer Z), called here Iron Z.
Mazinger Edition Z: The Impact! (2009)	An anime retelling of the original series, Shin Mazinger features characters and events from other Mazinger-related works, as well as other Go Nagai works, such as Mao Dante and Violence Jack, getting involved in the battle between Koji Kabuto and Dr. Hell. It also has a manga done by the Akumetsu duo. The story involves several alternate universes of Mazinger Z with a human version of Minerva X serving as a main character.
Mazinger Otome (2009)	A manga where the characters are the classic super robots (Mazinger Z, Great Mazinger, Grendizer, Kotetsu Jeeg) in the form of cute android girls. The Japanese title is a pun with the "Z" in Mazinger Z, using the kanji "乙" (otsu) from the word "乙女" (otome: maiden).
Mazinkaizer SKL (2010)	An OVA, manga (Mazinkaiser SKL Versus) and novel series.
Mazinger Otome Taisen (2011)	Manga sequel to Mazinger Otome.
Shin Mazinger ZERO vs The Great General of Darkness (2013)	Manga sequel to the Shin Mazinger ZERO manga.
Mazinger ZIP (2013)	Short TV anime parody of Mazinger Z
Robot Girls Z (2014)	ONA series about Go Nagai's and Toei's robots turned into girls. Similar concept to Mazinger Otome.
Grendizer Giga (2014)	Manga re-imagining of Grendizer.
Robot Girls Z Plus (2015)	ONA sequel to Robot Girls Z.
Mazin Battle (2015)	Manga spin-off of Mazinger.
Mazinger Z Alter Ignition (2017)	Manga re-imagining of the original Mazinger Z.
Mazinger Z Interval Peace (2017)	Manga spin-off of the Mazinger Z movie.
Mazinger Z: Infinity (2017)	Anime movie sequel to the original Mazinger Z TV series.
Mazinger Z vs. Transformers (2019)	A cross-over manga between Mazinger Z and Transformers.

God Mazinger is related by name only and Mazinkaiser is an OVA retelling of earlier Mazinger stories, based partly on designs created by Nagai for the Super Robot Wars series of video games and also on Nagai's original Mazinger manga stories.

Mazinger-Z also featured in a video game for the Genesis/Mega Drive. It went by several names like MazinWars and MazinSaga.

== Anime series staff ==
- NOTE: Not including parodies and crossovers series/films.

Title	Series director	Head writer	Character designer	Composer	Studio	No. of episodes	Release year
Mazinger Z	Tomoharu Katsumata	Keisuke Fujikawa	Yukiyoshi Hane	Chumei Watanabe & Akira Ifukube	Toei Animation	92	1972–1974
Great Mazinger	Tomoharu Katsumata	Keisuke Fujikawa	Keisuke Morishita	Chumei Watanabe	Toei Animation	56	1974–1975
Grendizer	Tomoharu Katsumata	Shozo Uehara	Kazuo Komatsubara & Shingo Araki	Shunsuke Kikuchi	Toei Animation	74	1975–1977
God Mazinger	Yoshio Hayakawa	Hiroyuki Onodera	Satoshi Hirayama	Kentaro Haneda	TMS Entertainment	23	1984
Mazinkaiser	Masahiko Murata	Shinzo Fujita	Kenji Hayama	Kazuo Nobuta & Yogo Kono	Brain's Base	7	2001–2002
Mazinkaiser x Shogun of Darkness	Masahiko Murata	Satoru Nishizono	Kenji Hayama	Kazuo Nobuta	Brain's Base	Movie	2003
Mazinger Edition Z: The Impact!	Yasuhiro Imagawa		Shinji Takeuchi	Akira Miyagawa	Bee Media	26	2009
Mazinkaiser SKL	Jun Kawagoe	Tadashi Hayakawa	Takeshi Ito	Yoshichika Kuriyama & Shiho Terada	Actas	3	2011
Mazinger Z: Infinity	Junji Shimizu	Takahiro Ozawa	Hiroya Iijima	Toshiyuki Watanabe	Toei Animation	Movie	2017

== Common elements ==
Throughout the storylines, common characters and traits tie the series together.

=== Body structure & colouring scheme ===
Except God Mazinger, the other mazingers share a very distinctive physiognomy, though the proportions and overall presence is modified in each one.

Mazinger Z usually looks shorter and wider compared to Great Mazinger, who has a more slender physique. This is mainly due to the "helmets", which is how one can tell them apart. The helmet of Great Mazinger is pointed while the top of Mazinger Z's is "flat-topped". MazinKaiser looks more heavily built than either of them, and sports the typical over-detailed (more ornate) style of more modern mechas (consider there's a 30-year gap between the first two and him). MazinKaiser is also the bigger/taller of the three.

The main colours are always black (torso, hips, shoulders, sometimes limbs), white ("steel colored") (waist and limbs, with slight variations towards light shades of yellow and blue tones depending on the version), very dark blue or almost black, depending on the depiction (face, limbs) and red (chest plate and flying devices). The head is usually steel/grey, with a cavity for the ship that controls the mecha.

This cavity becomes increasingly complex in each incarnation. Mazingers have characteristic horns at each side of the head where the ears would go on a human head, always coloured yellow, the eyes are yellow with the exception of Mazinkaiser SKL which has blue eyes. The face is completed with a mouthplate with several narrow apertures on it.

Even though Grendizer strays a bit from these guidelines, the resemblance to the other Mazingers is obvious.

=== Weaponry ===
Each Mazinger builds on the previous one by enhancing the power of an attack that already existed, plus adding some new ones. Weapons like Rust Hurricane (or "Booster Hurricane"), Rocket Punch, and Breast Fire are shared by Mazinger Z, Great Mazinger and MazinKaiser; Mazinkaiser comprises the weapons of the two previous Mazingers and adds a factor of uncontrollable energy associated to them (for example, sometimes it's hard for Koji to keep the mecha stable when using the two attacks previously mentioned). All Mazingers, except God Mazinger, have "Rocket Punch" attacks, in which they launch their arms as projectiles, which return after being shot towards the enemy.

Grendizer has few similar weapons, but it even expands its arsenal with several large ships that give him different capabilities, such as the Spaizer, Double Spaizer, Drill Spaizer, Marine Spaizer and other related machines. (These are also called "Spacer")

=== Hover Pilder ===
Traditionally, Mazingers are controlled thanks to a flying vehicle that docks on the mecha's head and activates it.

The first one, built for Mazinger Z, was the Hover Pilder, a small hovercraft, later replaced by the Jet Pilder. In Great Mazinger, this device takes the form of Brain Condor, and in Mazinkaiser it's called the Kaiser Pilder, which resembles Brain Condor more closely due to its sharp shape (in contrast to Mazinger Z's Pilder, that had a more bulbous shape) and the way it rests on Kaiser's head, leaving one of its fins standing vertically like the crest of a rooster.

These aircraft are always red, except in the Mazinkaiser OVA version of Mazinger Z, where the Hover Pilder is white. Grendizer doesn't have a small aircraft, instead the robot itself is fitted inside a larger ship called the spazer for aerial attacks and the robot can launch from it whenever there is a need for a ground battle. Some times Grendizer can stand on top of the spaizer and use it to fly so it can have more freedom in aerial battles.

=== Jet Scrander / Jet Scrambler ===
Mazinger Z wasn't conceived as a flying robot, and hence he is later equipped with Jet Scrander (or "Jet Scrambler"), a detachable device that allows him to face aerial monsters. This machine also had razor-sharp wings that could be used to cut enemies while in flight.

Great Mazinger has an incorporated Scramble Dash, that can retract itself when not needed. However, he is also given Great Booster, a very powerful device that attached itself to Great's body pretty much the same way Jet Scrander did to Z's and allowed him to fly at higher speeds.

Mazinkaiser has Kaiser Scrander (or "Kaiser Scrambler"), which is very similar to Jet Scrander in its colour scheme (red and yellow) and the fact that it's not part of the mecha but connects to it when required. Notably, since Kaiser can't use his chest plate as boomerang (a Great Mazinger gimmick) he uses Kaiser Scrander in a similar fashion, due to its sharp wings.

The Shin Mazinger incarnation presents the God Scrander ("God Scrambler"), which appears on the first chapters and in the latter part of the series. It also allows Mazinger to use a new attack, the Big Bang Punch, which consists in Shin combining with the God Scrander and transforming into a gigantic hand, and later making a fist that immediately turns golden-coloured, and is used as a scaled-up Rocket Punch. During the transformation, the God Scrander would compose three of the "fingers", and Mazinger uses his arms as the other two.

=== Female mecha ===
Mazinger pioneered the concept of female mechas that, while not nearly as powerful as the main robot (with the probable exception of Minerva X, as she was designed to be a direct counterpart to Mazinger Z), play a significant role in the battle against the enemy.

Their most noticeable characteristic is their main weapon, the Oppai Missiles, missiles posing as breasts placed on the mecha's chest. Again, Minerva doesn't follow this canon completely since her breast fire is identical to the male Mazingers, and she wasn't controlled by a human being (until her appearance in the Mazinger Angels series).

No female mechas were included in Grendizer, but characters like Hikaru and Maria prove to be helpful and brave in battle. They are (in order of appearance): Aphrodite A, Minerva X, Diana A, and Venus A.

Notably, in Mazinger Angels, Minerva has a special berserker mode, the "Sirene Mode", in which she takes a form similar to that of Silene, a character from Nagai's Devilman.

=== Shared characters ===
Many characters appear in different points of each plot;

- Kouji Kabuto: The original Mazinger Z pilot reappears towards the ending of the Great Mazinger series, again piloting Mazinger Z. He then appears in Grendizer, but this time he does not pilot a mecha but a spaceship, and later the Double Spaizer. Koji becomes the pilot of MazinKaiser in the most recent incarnation of the series. Sayaka Yumi also appears in the three main Mazinger sagas.
- Dr. Hell: Mazinger Z's nemesis, this evil scientist dies at the end of that storyline, but is brought back to life as the Great Marshall of Hell in Great Mazinger. He reappears in Mazinkaiser and Shin Mazinger Z-Hen.
- Shiro Kabuto: Koji's little brother, appears in Mazinger Z and Great Mazinger, where he learns that Kenzo Kabuto is his father, thought to be dead in the previous series.
- Archduke Gorgon: In Mazinger Z he plays a treacherous role as Hell's collaborator, when in reality he is a messenger from the Mikene Empire, who are using Hell to their own profit. Only in Great Mazinger his true hierarchy among the Mikenese armies is revealed.
- Hikaru Makiba and Maria Fleed: two female characters from Grendizer, pilots of Marine Spaizer and Drill Spaizer respectively, appear as pilots in Mazinger Angels, Hikaru piloting Diana and Maria piloting Minerva.

=== Villains ===
Mazinger villains tend to be bizarre, having a dual nature or bodies that are made of disparate parts:

- Baron Ashura's body is half male and half female, he/she resulted from a bizarre experiment of Dr. Hell who stitched together incomplete parts of two ancient mummies and then revived the resulting body 'à-la-Frankenstein'.
- Count Blocken was a German Waffen-SS officer who, gravely wounded, was given to the unearthly cares of Dr. Hell, a Nazi collaborator during the second World War. He managed to save his life by keeping alive his severed head, which can float on its own and never rests on his shoulders.
- Viscount Pigman has the body of a large tribal warrior and where the head should be there's a mannequin-like upper body of a pygmy shaman.
- Archduke Gorgon's trunk is placed on the back of a sabretooth tiger.
- Marquis Janus can twist her neck 180 degrees, shifting from the face of a beautiful woman to that of a haggard witch.
- The Seven Generals of Mikene are composed of different parts of animals grouped together, like mammals, birds, humanoids, etc.
- General Gandal, of the Vegan empire, shares the same body with Lady Gandal; at first his face would split to show a feminine figure from the inside; later her face alternatively replaces Gandal's, often taking control of the body. This is a similar masculine-feminine duality to the one seen in Baron Ashura.

=== Evil mecha armies ===
One of the main attributes of the Mazinger series is the existence of a large amount of evil mechas, which are incredibly varied in shape and weapons and serve as monsters of the week. Dr. Hell's Mechanical Beasts, the Mikene Empire Warrior Beasts and the Vegan Empire Spacial Monsters usually have nightmarish appearances, and though they are never as powerful as the hero robot, they are quite capable of putting him against the ropes.
