= Mazinger Angels =

Manga

- cover of volume 01 of the Mazinger Angels manga

マジンガーエンジェル (Majinga Enjeru)
- Genre: Adventure, Mecha
- Manga
- Written by: Go Nagai
- Illustrated by: Akihiko Niina
- Published by: Kodansha
- Magazine: Magazine Z
- Original run: June 26, 2004 – November 25, 2006
- Volumes: 4

Mazinger Angels (マジンガーエンジェル, Majinga Enjeru) is a manga series which began in 2004 and chronicles the adventures of four women who pilot giant robots in the Mazinger vein. The concept is a spoof on the late 1970s and early 1980s popular TV series Charlie's Angels. It was originally published in Kodansha's Magazine Z, starting on 26 June 2004 (#2004-08) and ending on 25 November 2006 (#2007-01). It was compiled in four tankōbon.

Three of the robots, Aphrodite A, Diana A and Minerva X are from the original Mazinger Z series, while Venus A is from the Great Mazinger series. Their pilots are also traditional characters from Go Nagai's universe, Sayaka Yumi and Jun Hono from Mazinger Z and Great Mazinger respectively, and Hikaru Makiba and Maria Fleed from Grendizer.

The style of the manga highlights the sex appeal of both the characters and the mechas, sometimes similarly to the way Aika's female characters are shown.

There is a sequel, released on 26 December 2007 in Magazine Z as well, called Mazinger Angels Z (マジンガーエンジェルZ), which features the original design for Mazinger Z, called Energer Z, as well as Kikunosuke Abashiri from Abashiri Ikka.

== Mecha Description and Pilots ==
Aphrodite, Diana, Venus and Minerva in their Mazinger Angels incarnations.

All four robots have a simplified color scheme compared to the older versions, usually reducing the number of colors to only two, but respecting the overall appearance of the robot. They sport heart shaped designs in different parts of their bodies as well as the Mazinger Angels symbol, a winged heart. They also become substantially more powerful and resistant, adding several weapons (many inspired by the Mazingers' ones) to their classic ones.

The mecha pilots wear their classic outfits plus the Mazinger Angels symbol.

- Aphrodite A: Aphrodite is piloted by Sayaka Yumi, her classic pilot from Mazinger Z. In this version, Aphrodite is now orange and white, in contrast to the anime version, which was orange, magenta and red. Her weapons are:
  - Regular Chest Missiles
  - Iron Cutter Missile: A weapon that resembles Mazinger Z's Iron Cutters.
  - Megaton Hammer: A pair of flails attached to Aphrodite's chest.
  - Snow White Aphrodite / Breast Heart Fire: Aphrodite is modified in one occasion and covered with an acid proof paint coat to face the attack of a monster. She is painted white and gold and also sports chest plates that rotate to form a heart that fires a powerful beam.
- Diana A: Diana's pilot is Hikaru Makiba, from Grendizer. In Mazinger Angels Z, she retires from active duty, joining the Mazinger Angels' creator as his assistant. She is now depicted in blue and white, and has the following weapons:
  - Regular Chest Missiles
  - Screw Crasher Missile: Similar to Grendizer's Screw Crasher Punch.
  - Liquid Shooter: Acid shooting guns.
  - Blizzard Smash: A freezing weapon.
- Venus A: Piloted by Jun Hono, her classic pilot in Great Mazinger. Venus is now painted red and white. Her weapons are:
  - Regular Chest Missiles
  - Finger Missile: The classic weapon from the anime.
  - Drill Pressure Missile: Venus can fire two giant jet drills from her chest.
  - Fire Tornado: Similar to the Blizzard Smash, but this weapon melts everything it touches instead of freezing it.
- Minerva X: Controlled by Maria Fleed, also from Grendizer. Maria has psychokinetic powers that allow her to control the robot thanks to a special helmet that channels her brain waves. At first she uses Minerva against the girls because she holds them responsible for the supposed death of her dog Duke, but later realizes thanks to Hikaru that this was not their fault. Duke is later saved and given a prosthetic limb. Minerva's purple color scheme is the most noticeable since it is completely different from the usual Mazinger-like one. She seems to be above the other angels in terms of power, and her weapons are:
  - Rocket Punch: The same attack Minerva has in the anime, taken from Mazinger Z; Minerva can fire her fists.
  - Breast Fire: Another classic attack from the anime, a powerful beam shot from her chest plates.
  - Photon Beams: Optic rays.
  - Sirene Mode: Minerva can shift from her regular form to a stronger one, able to fly thanks to wings placed on her head. When transformed she resembles Sirène, a character from Devilman.
  - Thunder Breaker: (In Sirene Mode) similar to Great Mazinger's Thunder Break.

Aphrodite, Diana and Venus also have swords called Mazinger Blades.

- Fire Venus: An older machine piloted by Sakurako. Its primary weapons and attacks are fire-based.
- Cutie Honey: Piloted by Honey Kisaragi, this resembles a giant mechanical version of her normal heroic alter-ego.
- Iron Z: Piloted by Kikunosuke Abashiri, who, in this universe, resembles Mazinger Z protagonist Koji Kabuto. Though Iron Z is based on Mazinger Z, the unit resembles more its prototype unit, Energer Z.

== Enemies ==
Many classic enemies and Mechanical Beasts are featured in Mazinger Angels.

- Baron Ashura: This time Ashura is not a merged individual but two separate ones, a male and a female, who happen to be lovers. They use Jet Fire P1 (in its classic manga version, not the anime one) to commit thefts and gather enough money to buy an island where they can live together.
- Marquis Janus: Here she is called Madame Janus, and it's not a witch but the aging owner of a host club. She uses the Gamia Sisters to kill young beautiful women driven mad by envy at their youth. She also uses Garada K7 to attack the Angels.
- Archduke Gorgon: This version shows Gorgon with legs and his tiger detached, and has psychokinetic abilities. He controls Toros D7, a classic mechanical beast that appears in the manga, in Mazinkaiser, and in Shin Mazinger Shougeki! Z Hen. Later, he tries to control Minerva but his brains explode under the pressure of controlling the mecha.
- Dr. Hell: Hell sends an army of Doublas M2 robots from his Gool fortress, that later merge into King Doublas. He is the one that provides the other enemies their mechabeasts and operates in the shadows. Once, he gives Satan Claus P10 to a thief obsessed with female underwear.
- Count Brocken: He appears with a normal head instead of a detached, floating one. He uses Gusios βIII against the Angels, but it's stopped by Aphrodite in its Snow White form. He is served by the Iron Crosses.

== Media ==
=== Manga ===
No.	Release date	ISBN
1	February 23, 2005	978-4-06-349196-8
2	August 23, 2005	978-4-06-349215-6
3	April 21, 2006	978-4-06-349241-5
4	February 23, 2007	978-4-06-349270-5

==== Releases outside Japan ====
The manga was also released in Hong Kong and Taiwan by d/visual taipei and in Italy by d/visual. The Catalan and Spanish versions were both released by Ooso Comics.

No.	Taiwan Hong Kong		Italy		Catalonia		Spain	
No.	Release date	ISBN	Release date	ISBN	Release date	ISBN	Release date	ISBN
1	November 10, 2006	9867184386	March 30, 2007	9784862371508	March 12, 2018	9788494816048	March 12, 2018	9788494816000
2	February 7, 2007	9867184394	January 11, 2008	9784862371515	July 12, 2018	9788494816055	July 12, 2018	9788494816017
3	April 21, 2007	9867184408	April 24, 2008	9784862371522	November 1, 2018	9788494816062	November 1, 2018	9788494816024
4	June 5, 2007	986718453X	June 20, 2008	978-4862371584	May 31, 2019	9788494816079	May 31, 2019	9788494816031

=== Toys ===
Besides the manga, a series of toys from the Soul of Chogokin line from Bandai have been released. The main robots from Mazinger Angels are available as part of the GX prefix. They also have the extra prefix MA in the code.

Code	Model	Release date
GX-08MA	Aphrodai A (Mazinger Angels)	2004
GX-08MAW	Aphrodai A (Snow White Version)	2005
GX-09MA	Minerva X (Mazinger Angels)	2004
GX-09MAB	Minerva X (La Sirene do Noir)	2006
GX-11MA	Dianan A (Mazinger Angels)	2004
GX-11MAM	Dianan A (Marine Blue Mermaid)	2007
GX-12MA	Venus A (Mazinger Angels)	2004
GX-12MAG	Venus A (Queen of Gold)	2006

=== Music ===
Two original soundtracks were released as part of the series. They contain several new original melodies for the series, including a TV-sized main theme of Mazinger Angels, as well as several musical arrangements of melodies from several series of Go Nagai, including all the Mazinger related series and several other anime television series such as Devilman and Dororon Enma-kun.

Date	Title	Label	Standard number	EAN
2006-03-22	Original BGM Collection: Tamashii Mazinger Angels Majin Tenshi (オリジナルBGMコレクション魂 マジンガーエンジェル 魔神天使)	Columbia Music Entertainment	COCX-33619	4988001902676
2007-04-18	Majin Tenshi Mazinger Angels 2: Listen Mazinger Angels (魔神天使 マジンガーエンジェル 2 リッスン·マジンガーエンジェル)	Columbia Music Entertainment	COCX-34239	4988001947783
