= Mazinkaizer SKL =

OVA and manga series

- DVD cover of the first volume of Mazinkaizer SKL

マジンカイザースカル (Majinkaizā SKL)
- Genre: Mecha
- Created by: Go Nagai
- Manga

Mazinkaizer SKL Versus
- Written by: Kazumi Hoshi
- Published by: Emotion
- Magazine: Shu 2 Comic Gekkin
- Original run: April 23, 2010 – October 2011
- Volumes: 3
- Original video animation
- Directed by: Jun Kawagoe
- Written by: Tadashi Hayakawa
- Music by: Yoshichika Kuriyama; Shiho Terada
- Studio: Actas
- Licensed by: NA: Media Blasters
- Released: November 27, 2010 – April 7, 2011
- Runtime: 27 minutes (each)
- Episodes: 3
- Manga notes
- The magazine where the series was published is a mobile phone publication.

Mazinkaizer SKL (Note: The official website URL uses Mazinkaizer instead of the original Mazinkaiser and the Blu-ray cover of the first OVA shows the romanized title Mazinkaizer SKL.) (マジンカイザースカル, Majinkaizā Sukaru) is a Japanese OVA sequel to Go Nagai's Mazinkaiser, which was in itself a spinoff of Mazinger Z. The first episode of the OVA was first screened on November 27, 2010, and was released on January 28, 2011 . It also has a novel adaptation serialized in ASCII Media Works' Dengeki Hobby Magazine and a manga adaptation published in the mobile phone magazine Shu 2 Comic Gekkin. Like Mazinger Edition Z: The Impact!, characters and references to other works of Go Nagai appear in this series.

== Story ==
Prior to the events of the anime, the three factions—the Garan Army, the Kiba Army, and the Hachiryoukaku (Aira Army)—battle for total dominance of Machine Island, which they occupy. The island is basically a prison, isolated from the rest of the world. To assure total quarantine, a "Gravity Curtain" was formed within the island: only machines created by the worldwide government WSO are capable of entry to the island. The island also contains vast amount of resources, allowing the three factions to create a near-limitless supply of giant robots for their respective armies.

The WSO has learned that the Gravity Curtain has reached an unstable status and will explode within 66 hours, destroying all of Earth and human life itself. Each of the three factions controls a part of the mechanism responsible for the Gravity Curtain's operation. Knowing the danger of disabling the Gravity Curtain and combating the various factions, the WSO decides to send the Skull Force. The Skull Force is divided into two squadrons – one of which is the 2 member-only Death Caprice Squad, composed of Ken Kaidou and Ryou Magami, pilots of the Mazinger called Mazinkaizer SKL.

== Characters ==
- Ken Kaidou (海動剣, Kaidō Ken)

Voiced by: Shintarō Asanuma (Japanese); Ethan Murray (English)
One of the two main pilots of Mazinkaizer SKL and one-half of the Death Caprice Squad. Adept at fighting with a sword and knives, Ken takes control of SKL whenever it uses the Ganzantou. He has a hot-blooded, rude, and vulgar personality while his hairstyle is reminiscent of Koji Kabuto's, the protagonist of Mazinger Z. His code name is "Amon 6" (アモン6), Amon being a reference to the demon Amon from Devilman.

- Ryou Magami (真上遼, Magami Ryō)

Voiced by: Satoshi Hino (Japanese); Doug Erholtz (English)
One of the two main pilots of Mazinkaiser SKL and the other half of the Death Caprice Squad. A man with a mysterious past, he is very skilled with handguns and takes control of SKL in order to use its Breast Triggers in battle. He has a calm, nihilistic persona but fierce looking when angered while his hairstyle resembles Duke Fleed's, the main character from Grendizer. Ryou's codename is "Lucifer 4" (ルシファー4, Rushifā 4).

- Tsubasa Yuuki (由木翼, Yūki Tsubasa)

Voiced by: Saori Hayami (Japanese); Erin Fitzgerald (English)
An ally of Ken and Ryou who serves as an engineering officer. She is a member of the Gren Falcon Squad (グレンファルコン隊, Guren Farukon Tai), a division of the Skull Force. Although appearing timid and innocent-looking, she is very strict and diligent when performing missions.

- Kojindani (荒神谷, Kōjindani)

Voiced by: Katsumi Chō (Japanese); Bob Buchholz (English)
A member of the WSO and overall commander of the Skull Force.

- Scarlet Hibiki (スカーレット・ヒビキ, Sukāretto Hibiki)

Voiced by: Masumi Asano
Leader of the Gren Falcon Squad, a division of the Skull Force. In the manga version, she serves as the superior officer to Ken and Ryou.

- Kiba (キバ)

Voiced by: Nobuyuki Hiyama (Japanese); Grant George, Michael Sorich (English)
Leader of the Kiba Army. In addition to fighting against the other factions, he is obsessed with finding and defeating the Mazinkaizer SKL. When his entire army was wiped out by SKL's attack, he battles it himself with his mecha, the Bakuryuki, but was defeated and seemingly killed. He however survived, albeit badly scarred, and battles SKL one more time piloting the Iron Kaiser. He has an aggressive, brash, and reckless persona. In one scene he enjoys drinking with women by his side. It is suggested that the women in Kiba's army were former captives of the Aira Army converted to join his cause. His character motif is based on Zuba The Barbarian, a character from Go Nagai's manga of the same name. Kiba's forces are styled after the marauder types from Fist of the North Star and Mad Max 2. His fortress looks like a damaged aircraft base.

- Gouda (グーダ)

Voiced by: Nobuo Tobita (Japanese); Dan Woren (English)
One of Kiba's henchmen.

- Garan (ガラン)

Voiced by: Banjō Ginga (Japanese); David Lodge (English)
Leader of the Garan Army. Unlike Kiba, he is calm and more calculating in his persona. He is also skilled in the use of swords, which made him a match against Ken Kaido in their duel, and a formidable pilot, able to defeat SKL in their first battle. He is however defeated in their second battle when he leaves himself open upon learning of Himiko's death by Kiba. Garan's forces and fortress is styled after feudal Japan.

- Himiko (ヒミコ)

Voiced by: Kikuko Inoue (Japanese); Jessica Gee (English)
Loyal assistant of Garan. In episode 3, she is revealed to be Aira's elder sister and former leader of the Hachiryokaku, but defected to Garan for reasons unknown. She also knows the location of the Iron Kaiser, which leads to her murder by Kiba. Her character design is based on the Slum Queen, a character from Violence Jack.

- Aira (アイラ)

Voiced by: Atsuko Tanaka (Japanese); Jessica Straus (English)
Leader of the Aira Army, also known as the Hachiryoukaku (八稜郭, hachiryōkaku; loosely translated as "the Octagon"). Her design and persona is based on the character of the same name from God Mazinger

- Hurricane (ハリケーン, harikēn) Voiced by: Ryoko Shiraishi (Japanese); Bonie Cahoon (English),
- Fancy (ファンシー, fanshī) Voiced by: Mikako Takahashi (Japanese); Elvia Gaitan (English),
- Flash (フラッシュ, furasshu) Voiced by: Eri Kitamura,
- Misty (ミスティ, misuti) Voiced by: Ai Shimizu

Sworn sisters of the Hachiryoukaku and pilots of the Psycho Gear units. They are named after various forms of Cutie Honey.

== Mechas ==
- Mazinkaizer SKL

The titular mecha of the series, though only called Kaiser by the characters until the end of the series, when Yuuki refers to it by its full name. Unlike the Mazinkaiser featured in the first OVA series, manga, and in video games, this version of Mazinkaiser has a completely different design, sporting a more demonic look. One of the biggest changes is the Kaiser Pilder, the aircraft used to dock onto the crown of Mazinkaiser to control it. It has been renamed as the Skull Pilder and redesigned to resemble more of a human skull hence its name. The Skull Pilder also requires two pilots to control it, unlike the Kaiser Pilder where it is controlled by a single pilot. Another notable change is the eyelids having a blue color as opposed to yellow from past Mazingers. A skull in the center of Mazinkaizer SKL's chest is used in place of the "Z" symbol from the original Mazinkaiser.

The weapons for Mazinkaizer SKL are also different from that of the original Mazinkaiser. This incarnation of Mazinkaizer is equipped with a weapon known as the Ganzantou, a gigantic sword attached to its back. The sword's handle can be extended so it can be used as a pole weapon. The spikes extending at the other side of the Ganzantou's blade is designed to tear apart the innards of its target, as seen in the promotional images.

Another weapon unique to Mazinkaizer SKL are the Breast Triggers. Attached to Mazinkaizer SKL's chest area, they are a pair of handguns SKL can use to shoot its enemies from mid-range. Blades are also attached to the nozzle and beneath the handle of each handgun, allowing the Mazinkaizer SKL to slash at enemies up close. They can also be merged into a battle axe type weapon akin to the Getter Tomahawk and used as a melee weapon. When the Breast Triggers are not in use, they are holstered to the chest, which forms a resemblance of Devilman's face.

When combined with the Wingle's Scrander the Wing Cross, SKL's limiter is released, allowing it to fight at full power, changing its eye color from blue to yellow, as well as unlocking a new set of weapons which are variations of those from past Mazingers. The Tornado Crusher Punch is SKL's version of the Turbo Smasher Punch, with the difference being that Ken Kaido is able to guide them to their target after they are deployed. The Breast Triggers fire laser beams as opposed to solid rounds. The Rust Stream is SKL's version of the Rust Tornado from Mazinkaiser. The Thor Hammer Breaker allows SKL to shoot a huge bolt of lightning towards its target from the Ganzantou, similar to Great Mazinger's Thunder Break. Finally, the Inferno Blaster is SKL's most powerful attack, acting similar to the Fire Blaster from Mazinkaiser.

MAZINKAISER SKL & WINGLE

- Wingle (ウイングル, uinguru)

The female support robot for Mazinkaizer SKL. The Wingle's design incorporates the female mechas used in the Mazinger franchise (Aphrodite A, Venus A & Minerva X) as well as elements of Devil Lady. It is given black and light purple colors with some gold trimmings. The bat-like wings attached to the rear of the Wingle's head act as a Scrander part for SKL (called the Wing Cross), allowing the latter flight capabilities and unlocking its full potential. Like SKL, the Wingle also has a detachable cockpit on its head called the Lady Falcon, which is piloted by Tsubasa in the anime and Scarlet in the manga. Its weapons include a pair of detachable blades that can be mounted on the arms or the legs and used as boomerang-type projectiles, as well as a flail stored in the left breast.

- Bakuryuki

Kiba's personal mecha. It is a green colored unit with horns shaped like a crescent moon on its head and shoulders, almost resembling a samurai warrior. Like Mazinkaizer SKL, it is a very agile unit despite its heavily armored appearance. It rides a vehicle made of Caterpillar tracks for faster transport and is equipped with two large cannons on the front, although they were never used in the anime.

- Iron Kaiser

A robot hidden within Garan's fortress, it is a secret weapon developed by the WSO and serves as one-half of the Gravity Curtain, having been powered by the same source – the Graviton Reactor. The reactor grants the Iron Kaiser a near-limitless supply of energy as well as incredible speed and power. The overall armored design of the Iron Kaiser is loosely based on Shuten Doji, a character from Go Nagai's manga of the same name and sports a red and gray metallic color. It also has a Pilder attached to the robot's cranium, able to transform itself into a discus to slice off its target, similar to some of the enemy mechas found in Grendizer. Its weapons include its own version of the Turbo Smasher Punch (Smasher Punch) and Rust Tornado (Iron Tornado), a double-bladed spear, a Gatling gun, missile launchers, and shoulder blasters. The Iron Kaiser is piloted by Kiba in the final battle against SKL.

- Geistteles

The personal mecha of Garan. It is a large robot with the color schemes of white, gold and gray. Three horns are attached to its head, with spikes on the shoulder and knee caps and claws for the feet.

- Psycho Gear

A mass-produced female combat mecha of the Hachiryoukaku. It is equipped with Beam Weapons for combat, as well as producing a barrier needed to protect the Hachiryoukaku's home base from enemy attacks. The Psycho Gears piloted by Hurricane, Fancy, Misty and Flash are unique in that they are of different design styles.

- GRK-7

Mass-produced units of Kiba's army. The unit is based on Garada K7, one of the enemy units of Mazinger Z, and carries its signature giant sickles attached to its head. A mono-eyed mechanized head is used in place of a skull from the original Garada K7 and is given color schemes of purple and light green.

- DBM-2

Also a mass-produced unit of Kiba's army. This unit is based on the enemy mecha Doublas M2, also from Mazinger Z. It retains the dual head design and spikes on the legs. Changes made were to the lizard-like heads being more mechanical, sporting three sets of scopes and a mounting weapon at its mouth. It is given a more desert-style color scheme and a large Gatling gun is attached to the right hand.

- X Battler

Garan's personal robot army. This unit is based on KingDan X10, also from Mazinger Z. They are muscular robots with bull-like horns attached to its head. They have various color schemes and also possess a variety of combat weapons such as lances, glaives, flails and archery-type weapons.

- Mazin Brothers

Appearing only in the novel version, the Mazin Brothers are mass-produced versions of Mazinger Z. While it shares the same appearance as the original, it does not possess the same set of weapons. Instead, Mazin Brothers are either equipped with a set of missile launchers or a large Rust Hurricane Backpack as weapons.

- Mazinger Z

Appearing only in the novel version. This Mazinger Z appears severely damaged as it leads an army of mass-produced versions of itself called the Mazin Brothers in a losing battle against an enemy army. Despite its condition and the grim situation, Mazinger Z continues to battle until the arrival of Mazinkaizer SKL who provides the much needed reinforcement. The pilot of Mazinger Z is not named.

== Production ==
=== Staff ===
- Original work: Go Nagai, Dynamic Planning
- Director: Jun Kawagoe
- Series organization/script: Tadashi Hayakawa
- Mazinkaizer SKL/Wingle design: Tsuyoshi Nonaka (PLEX)
- Character design: Takeshi Ito
- Mecha design: Munetaka Abe, Toshiyuki Horii, Hiroshi Ogawa
- Music work: Lantis
- Sound director: Yoshikazu Iwanami
- Animation work: Actas
- Theme songs:
  - Opening: "The Eternal Soldiers" (performed by Loudness, lyrics by Minoru Niihara, composition by Akira Takasaki, arrangement by Loudness)
  - Ending: "Juggernaut" (performed by Sadie, lyrics by Mao, composition by Sadie, arrangement by Sadie)
  - Insert (Ep.03): LEGEND of KAISER (performed by Rey)

== Media ==
=== Anime ===
The OVA was first screened at Anime Fes. "VS" presented by Bandai Visual, the first episode on November 27, 2010, the second episode on December 25, 2010, and the third episode on January 22, 2011.

==== Episodes ====
No.	Title	Original release date
1	"Death caprice" "desu kapurīzu" (デス・カプリーズ)	January 28, 2011
2	"Search-and-Kill" "sāchi ando kiru" (サーチ・アンド・キル)	February 25, 2011
3	"Final Count" "fainaru kaunto" (ファイナル・カウント)	April 7, 2011

These are announced dates and titles.

==== Home video ====
The first OVA was released by Bandai Visual on November 27, 2010, on DVD (standard number BCBA-4002) and Blu-ray (standard number BCXA-0272). On December 1, 2010, North American anime distributor Media Blasters released it in May 2011 on DVD and Blu-ray and in 2013 on iTunes and Yekra after editing into an anime film.

=== Manga ===
Along the OVA series, the manga titled Mazinkaizer SKL Versus (マジンカイザーSKLヴァーサス, majinkaizā skl vāsasu), authored by Kazumi Hoshi, is published in the magazine for mobile phones Shu 2 Comic Gekkin by Emotion (Bandai), starting on April 23, 2010.

The manga is published in printed format by the Kadokawa Group Publishing under the Emotion Comics brand.

No.	Release date	ISBN
1	December 10, 2010	978-4-04-899201-5
2	April 8, 2011	978-4-04-899217-6

=== Novel ===
A novelization of the series was also released in Dengeki Hobby Magazine.
