= Mazinger Z (1994 video game) =

1994 video game

- Developer: Eleven
- Publisher: Banpresto
- Composers: Maki Sugo; Hitoshi Sakimoto
- Platform: Arcade
- Release: JP: July 1994
- Genre: Scrolling shooter
- Modes: Single-player, multiplayer

Mazinger Z (Note: Japanese: マジンガーZ, Hepburn: Majingā Z) is a 1994 scrolling shooter video game developed by Eleven and published by Banpresto for arcades. It was only released in Japan in July 1994. It is based on the manga of the same name by Go Nagai, as well as its anime adaptation produced by Toei Animation.

== Gameplay ==
Mazinger Z is a vertically scrolling shooter. Players can choose between three playable robots from the Mazinger Z franchise: Mazinger Z , Great Mazinger, and Grendizer.

== Development and release ==
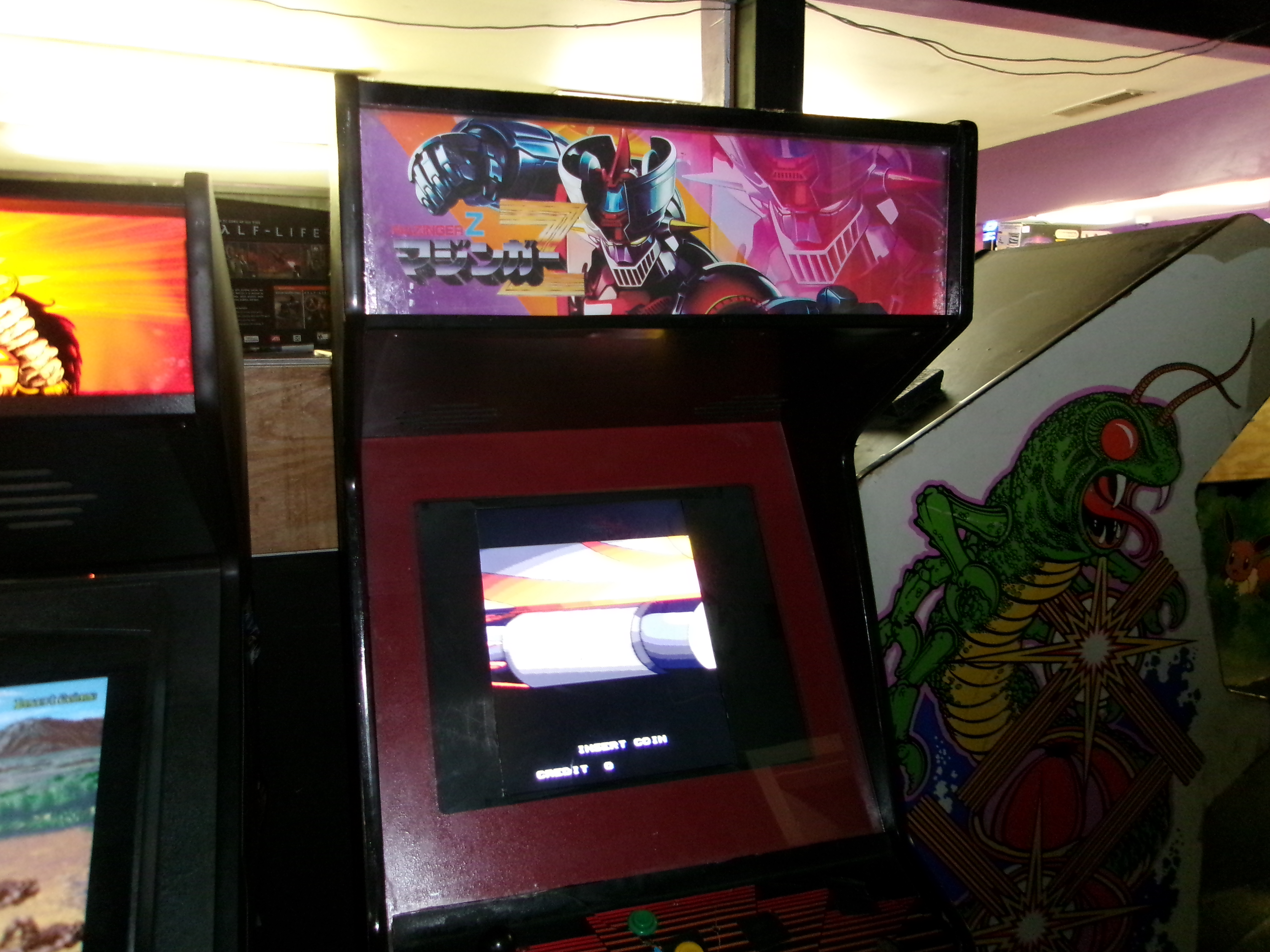
A Mazinger Z arcade cabinet.

Mazinger Z was developed by Japanese studio Eleven. It was originally released exclusively in the Japanese arcades by Banpresto in 1994. Hamster Corporation released the game as part of their Arcade Archives series for the Nintendo Switch and PlayStation 4 in May 2023. It was the first game in the series to be based on a non-game property; due to the involvement of Nagai himself, Toei Animation and Banpresto owner Bandai Namco Entertainment, Hamster sold the game at double the series' usual price to pay the license fees.

== Reception ==
Next Generation reviewed the game, rating it three stars out of five, and stated that "For those Shogun Warrior fans, this game is fantastic, for everyone else, it's OK."
