= Mazinger U.S.A. Version =

Comic series

Mazinger
- Cover of Mazinger vol. 1 (1988) by Go Nagai
- Genre: Science fantasy
- Author: Go Nagai
- Publisher: (United States) First Comics
- Other publishers: (Japan) Treville (Japan) Kodansha
- Original run: 1988
- Volumes: 1

Mazinger, later called Mazinger U.S.A. Version or Mazinger U.S. Version to avoid confusions with the rest of the Mazinger works, is a 60 pages comic series created by Go Nagai specifically for the US market. Sometimes it is also called incorrectly Mazinwarrior or MazinSaga, since its Mazinger's design is similar to the Mazinger of MazinSaga. It features full-color graphics, text in English and left-to-right formatting. It is the second comic created by Go Nagai for the US market after Oni (published in 1983). It is partially inspired by Gulliver's Travels.

== Plot ==
The story is set in the year 220X A.D., after hundreds of years in war that devastated planet Earth. The environment of the planet is so damaged that the fights have to be done wearing special combat armors. A new battle is rising, and the soldier Major Kabuto boards his combat robot, Mazinger. In the middle of the battle, Mazinger gets caught in an explosion which creates a wormhole that transports Mazinger into a parallel dimension. In this Earth, immediately after appearing, Mazinger saves a beautiful young woman, princess Krishna, from humanoid reptiles that are about to kill her.

It turns out that princess Krishna's kingdom of Lithgor is the last human land standing against the newly risen Zard Empire of the reptilian race, a race that cared only for war. The High King of Lithgor desired peace with the Zard empire, and overruled his council to seek a truce, but the Zard empire committed treachery and killed the High King and the rest of the nobles with the exception of princess Krishna.

After witnessing what Mazinger can do, Krishna requests his help to defend Lithgor. Mazinger does not want to intrude, but accepts to help on the condition of winning the love of Krishna, who is the woman of his dreams. Krishna had also dreamed of a man like Mazinger, but accepts mainly for the sake of her people. Mazinger warns her of the consequences of her promise, since he is a man from another world, stating that beneath the Mazinger armor, he is not like the men of Krishna's world. Even so, she accepts and Major Kabuto gets out of Mazinger, surprising the princess. Kabuto regrets that he finally finds the woman and the land of his dreams but it turns out to be of the wrong size. The princess comments that she had heard legends about the little people, about a man named Swift.

The final battle approaches and Mazinger requests to face all the Zard warriors alone. He uses his powerful armament, obliterating the Zard Empire but gets caught in another massive explosion and returns to his Earth. There, he encounters a partner who tells him that he was lost for a month, even though a day had only passed for him in the other Earth. When asked where he was, Kabuto answers that he was in an adventure and recalls his experience in Krishna's kingdom. He's interrupted by a new attack and gets ready to once again face his enemies. He says that he will keep fighting until he sees his beloved Krishna again.
