= Gosaku Ota =

Japanese manga artist (1948–2022)

- 桜多吾作
- Born: Junichi Ota; 16 March 1948; Kaminoyama, Yamagata Prefecture, Allied-occupied Japan
- Died: 12 December 2022 (aged 74); Gunma Prefecture, Japan
- Other names: Gosaku Outa, Gosaku Ōta
- Occupation: Mangaka

Junichi Ota (Japanese: 太田順一, 16 March 1948 – 12 December 2022), best known under the pen name Gosaku Ota (Japanese: 桜多吾作) was a Japanese manga artist.

== Life and career ==
Born in Kaminoyama, Ota started his career as an assistant of Shotaro Ishinomori. He made his official debut as a mangaka in 1969 with the shōjo manga Bōifurendo yai! ("Hey boyfriend!").

Ota is best known for co-creating with Go Nagai the shōnen manga Groizer X, later adapted in an anime, and for the manga adaptations of other Nagai's works such as Mazinger Z, Great Mazinger, Getter Robo, Grendizer, Steel Jeeg. Other successful works include the fishing-themed manga Tsuri Baka Taishō ("Master of Fishing"), which spanned 10 tankōbon volumes, and the shōnen manga Mach SOS. He was also a longtime collaborator of Sports Nippon, for which he produced fishing-themed comic strips from 1981 to 2019.

Ota died of COVID-induced pneumonia on 12 December 2022, at the age of 74.
