= Yū Okazaki =

Japanese manga artist

- Born: August 28, 1951 (age 75); Mie Prefecture, Japan
- Occupation: Manga artist
- Writing career
- Genre: fiction

Yū Okazaki (岡崎 優, Okazaki Yū; born August 28, 1951 in Mie Prefecture, Japan) is a Japanese manga artist and a former member of Dynamic Productions. His real name is Yoshihiro Okada (岡田 義弘, Okada Yoshihiro), which he has used in some publications. After finishing high school, he joined Dynamic Productions and while working as Go Nagai's assistant, he debuted with Hello! Love for the Gakken Naka ni Course magazine. His most representative work is the manga version of the anime Mobile Suit Gundam published from 1979-05 to 1980-02 by Akita Shoten in the magazine Boken Oh. He has also worked in some manga versions of Cutie Honey and UFO Robot Grendizer.

In the 1990s, after working in Josei manga, he took a break from manga publications which is still in effect.
