= The Abashiri Family =

Manga

- Abashiri Ikka
- Abashiri Ikka vol. 1, 1985 edition

あばしり一家
- Genre: Action, comedy, crime
- Manga
- Written by: Go Nagai
- Published by: Akita Shoten
- Magazine: Weekly Shōnen Champion
- Original run: August 10, 1969 – April 9, 1973
- Volumes: 15
- Original video animation
- Directed by: Takashi Watanabe
- Produced by: Yukina Hiiro; Shigenori Kurii
- Written by: Takashi Watanabe
- Music by: Takeo Miratsu
- Studio: Studio Pierrot; Tokyo Kids
- Licensed by: NA: ADV Films
- Released: May 21, 1991 – November 21, 1991
- Runtime: 20 minutes (each)
- Episodes: 4
- Live-action film

Abashiri Ikka: The Movie
- Directed by: Teruyoshi Ishii
- Produced by: Seiji Nanbaz; Hideo Iwashita
- Written by: Sadayuki Murai
- Studio: Total Media Corporation; Oscar
- Released: November 21, 2009
- Runtime: 75 minutes

Abashiri Ikka (あばしり一家; known in the United States as The Abashiri Family) is a Japanese manga series created by Go Nagai that originally ran in the magazine Weekly Shōnen Champion. Some of its characters returned with different names as part of other series, such as Cutie Honey, UFO Robot Grendizer and Mazinger Angels Z among others.

Some of the first stories were adapted into an original video animation by Studio Pierrot in 1991, distributed by Pony Canyon in four installments as part of Anime V Comic Rentaman, and later released as a standalone VHS and LaserDisc on March 21, 1992, also by Pony Canyon. The OVA was brought to North America by ADV Films in 1995.

The manga was also adapted into a live-action film released in 2009.

== Plot ==
The series deals with the adventures of the Abashiri family, a clan of criminals who are feared by the police and other criminals alike, as they are a destructive force to be reckoned with. Although they are virtually unstoppable, they do not have great desires and many of their plans are normally minor and sometimes get undone by their own foolishness. That is unless they are attacked, at which point they will retaliate with full force, normally with deadly consequences for their enemies.

As the series progresses, its tone becomes less crime-focused and more a gag comedy with strong touches of eroticism. The series was originally conceived by Nagai as a form of protest and parody of the controversy that arose with Harenchi Gakuen. While having a grim tone at the beginning, the series lightens up as it progresses, although the graphic violence remains through most of it but becoming less frequent.

The series remained popular in its original run until Nagai decided to drop it along with other series that he was doing at the time in order to concentrate on the Devilman manga. Years later, a single one-shot story was published and has since been included in all new tankōbon series. A special crossover one-shot with Cutie Honey was also published in 2009, in commemoration of the 40th anniversary of the magazine Shōnen Champion, where both series debuted in manga.

== Characters ==
- Daemon Abashiri (亜馬尻 駄エ門, Abashiri Daemon)

The head of the family. An old and small man, father of the other four, each of them from a different mother (each one with a similar appearance to the sons). He acts as the leader and is the most powerful of them, though he normally only displays his true power when his sons and daughter are in danger.

- Kikunosuke Abashiri (亜馬尻 菊の助, Abashiri Kikunosuke; also written sometimes 亜馬尻 菊之助)

The daughter of the family. She is the most adept at close combat fights and the one that normally loses her clothes during the series. Stories in the series often revolve around her.

- Goemon Abashiri (亜馬尻 五エ門, Abashiri Goemon)

The expert thief of the family and the oldest son. His main hobby is doing lecherous things and peeping at women, particularly at his sister. Later in the manga, he adopts a pseudo-heroic identity disguised with a mask and a horn on his crotch. He was modeled after Go Nagai's former assistant, Ken Ishikawa.

- Naojiro Abashiri (亜馬尻 直次郎, Abashiri Naojirō)

The second oldest son and the powerhouse of the family. He's the most physically powerful of the family as well as the biggest, being a cyborg. In the first chapters he was depicted as a gangster with a prosthetic right leg. It was later shown that he is actually a cyborg whose every limb can be detached to use guns. Later in the manga, he is no longer depicted as a gangster with a prosthetic limb and rarely depicted as a cyborg; instead he is shown more like a typical strongman.

- Kichiza Abashiri (亜馬尻 吉三, Abashiri Kichiza)

The youngest member of the family, a small kid with a mean look. While not a fighter like Kikunosuke or Naojiro, he is an expert in explosives, using mostly his special disguise.

== Manga ==
The original manga was published in the magazine Weekly Shōnen Champion (at the time only Shōnen Champion) published by Akita Shoten, from August 10, 1969 (first number of the magazine) to April 9, 1973 (cover dates). It has since then has been republished in tankōbon format several times.

- Akita Shoten (Shōnen Champion Comics, 1970–1973, reprinted in 1997)

Vol.	Japanese release date	Reprint date	Reprint ISBN
01	July 20, 1970	July 1997	4253056512
02	November 10, 1970	August 1997	4253056520
03	March 10, 1971	September 1997	4253056539
04	October 5, 1971	September 1997	4253056547
05	April 10, 1972	September 1997	4253056555
06	May 10, 1972	October 1997	4253056563
07	July 10, 1972	October 1997	4253056571
08	August 10, 1972	October 1997	425305658X
09	October 15, 1972	November 1997	4253056598
10	November 25, 1972	November 1997	4253056601
11	January 25, 1973	November 1997	425305661X
12	April 30, 1973	December 1997	4253056628
13	October 30, 1973	December 1997	4253056636
14	December 10, 1973	January 1998	4253056644
15	December 25, 1973	January 1998	4253056652

- Akita Shoten (Akita Manga Bunko, 1977–1978, reprinted in 1990)

Vol.	Japanese release date	Reprint date	Reprint ISBN
1	June 20, 1977	January 1990	978-4-253-01509-7
2	July 20, 1977	January 1990	978-4-253-01510-3
3	August 20, 1977	January 1990	978-4-253-01511-0
4	August 20, 1977	January 1990	978-4-253-01512-7
5	August 20, 1977	January 1990	978-4-253-01513-4
6	January 20, 1978	January 1990	978-4-253-01514-1
7	March 20, 1978	January 1990	978-4-253-01515-8
8	December 20, 1978	January 1990	978-4-253-01516-5

- Akita Shoten (Akita Comics Selection, 1985–1987)

Vol.	Japanese release date	ISBN
1	December 20, 1985	4253108636
2	May 20, 1986	4253108644
3	September 20, 1986	4253108652
4	January 10, 1987	4253108660

- Kadokawa Bunko (Kadokawa Shoten, 1997)

Vol.	Japanese release date	ISBN
1	June 25, 1997	4041978041
2	July 25, 1997	404197805X
3	August 23, 1997	4041978068
4	September 25, 1997	4041978076
5	November 25, 1997	4041978084

- King Series Manga Super Wide (Koike Shoin, 2009)

Vol.	Japanese release date	ISBN
1	November 10, 2009	978-4862255570
2	November 25, 2009	978-4862255587

Additionally, the series is also available in ebook format, published by ebookjapan.

=== Short stories ===
A 31-pages one-shot short story titled Abashiri Ikka: Goemon Seijin (あばしり一家 ゴエモン星人) was published in Akita Shoten's Play Comic in April 14, 1977. It has since then been included in most compilations as the last story.

The short crossover story titled Cutie Honey vs Abashiri Ikka (キューティーハニーVSあばしり一家) was published in the Akita Shoten's magazine Weekly Shōnen Champion in April 16, 2009 (#20) and April 23, 2009 (#21+22). As the title implies, characters of both series interact with each other and the relationship of Daemon with both series is central to the plot. This one-shot was published as part of the 40th anniversary of the magazine, which was the same where both series were originally published. It has been compiled in the tankōbon Shukan Shōnen Champion 40th Sokan: 40 Shunen Kinen Tokubetsu Henshu (週刊少年チャンピオン40th 創刊40周年記念特別編集), published in February 8, 2010 by Akita Shoten with ISBN 978-4-253-10200-1.

== OVA ==
=== Plot ===
The four Abashiri prepare to rob a large bank as their last work. This bank, however, is in reality a trap by the police, which is ready to expend every necessary resource to end with the Abashiri. Although apparently cornered, the Abashiri overwhelm the police and kill or badly injure several of the policemen. They use so much power that they also destroy a large part of their loot.

After they return to their home, Daemon informs them the reason behind their retirement. Kikunosuke, whom the rest her brothers considered a boy, is actually a girl. For generations the Abashiri believed to have been cursed because no female child had been in the family until the arrival of Kikunosuke. This prompts her mother to request Daemon to stop the criminal activities of the family after Kikunosuke reaches a certain age. Her brothers are surprised by this revelation and the lecherous Goemon takes a special interest in her sister. Daemon intends to send her to a private school where she can become a proper lady. Although Kikunosuke originally refuses, Daemon tricks her into saying that she would try it and forces her to go, under the identity of Shiratori.

The Paradise school, however, turns out to be a criminal school where students have to fight for their survival. Thanks to her strength, she manages to overcome the teachers. At the same time, her brother Goemon is so fixated with seeing her naked that he decides to secretly look for her at her new school. Kikunosuke is able to make a new friend, Yukiko, another girl, who, unlike Kikunosuke, is completely defenseless against the teachers and other students.

For standing up against the teachers, one of them plans to kill Kikunosuke but she easily kills him. He's able however to recognize her true identity and pass the message among the other teachers. As she runs to rescue Yukiko, she realizes that she won't be able to beat all the teachers by herself and ask for help. With the help of the leader of the students, a revolt is formed and the school director orders to kill them all.

Daemon realizes the danger in which Kikunosuke is and with his sons goes to save her. Meanwhile, Goemon manages to arrive to her school only to find Yukiko captive and get himself caught. The students and Kikunosuke (despite being injured) fight all opposition and despite losing several students, are holding on. It's revealed then that the student's leader has been preparing to take the school for himself. The rest of the Abashiri also enter the fight and Daemon recognizes the true identity of the director, Danjuro Namakubi, whom he has fought already two times in the past. The director is able to easily defeat Naojiro. By this point, the students' leader has already betrayed Kikunosuke and uses Goemon and Yukiko as hostages in order to subdue her. Daemon is able to kill the director, but has to surrender to the students leader because he holds Kikunosuke and Goemon while killing Yukiko, who tried to free Kikunosuke.

As the Abashiri are about to be executed, the remaining Abashiri, Kichiza, enters abruptly and with his special explosive costume manages to kill most of the leader's gang and free Kikunosuke, but leaves alive the leader in order to let Kikunosuke deal with him. An enraged Kikunosuke shows no mercy and uses her most powerful technique, the Abashiri 8 God attack, with which she kills the leader in the most painful way. The experience lived makes Kikunosuke cry and Daemon consoles her.

Years later, and old Daemon is shown watching his grandson (named also Kikunosuke) practice the Abashiri 8 God attack while her mother, Kikunosuke arrives, now being a normal woman and thus fulfilling Daemon's wish of her having a peaceful normal life.

=== Episodes ===
No.	Title	Original release date
1	"Explosion of violence!! We don't have justice!" "sakuretsu baiorensu!! ore tachi ni seigi wa nai!" (炸裂バイオレンス!!おれたちに正義はない!)	May 21, 1991
2	"Hell! Paradise school" "jigoku! paradaisu gakuen" (地獄!パラダイス学園)	July 21, 1991
3	"Riot! A storm in the paradise" "bōdō! paradaisu no arashi" (暴動!パラダイスの嵐)	September 21, 1991
4	"The price of betrayal" "uragiri no hōshū" (裏切りの報酬)	November 21, 1991

=== Releases ===
==== Anime V Comic Rentaman ====
The OVA was originally released as part of Studio Pierrot's video magazine show Anime V Comic Rentaman (アニメ・V・コミック レンタマン) along with Yumemakura Baku Twilight Gekijo, Eguchi Hisashi no Kotobuki Goro Show and Akai Hayate. The Rentaman experimental concept consisted of these anime divided in episodic short serials. For this reason, the running time of each episode varies greatly. Rentaman was only released on VHS format and published under the Nextart label (Pony Canyon).

#	Release date	Format	Standard number
1	May 21, 1991	VHS	PCVF-30006
2	July 21, 1991	VHS	PCVF-30007
3	September 21, 1991	VHS	PCVF-30008
4	November 21, 1991	VHS	PCVF-30009

==== Additional releases in Japan ====
After the release of Rentaman, Abashiri Ikka was released separately in both VHS (PCVF-30022) and LaserDisc (PCLP-00279) format, also by Nextart, on March 21, 1992.

#	Release date	Format	Standard number
1–4	March 21, 1992	VHS	PCVF-30022
1–4	March 21, 1992	LaserDisc	PCLP-00279

==== Releases outside Japan ====
The OVA was released in the United States in November 11, 1998 by ADV Films, subtitled and in VHS format.

=== Staff and cast ===
- Distributor: Nextart (Pony Canyon)
- Original work: Go Nagai
- Director/storyboards: Takashi Watanabe
- Character design/animation director: Shigeki Awai
- Art director: Hitoshi Nagao
- Music director: Yoshikazu Iwanami
- Music: Takeo Miratsu
- Producer: Yukina Hiiro, Shigenori Kurii
- Production: Dynamic Planning, Studio Pierrot
- Theme song: Yasashiku Nanka Nai! (やさしくなんかない！) (lyrics by Yumi Morita, composition by Daijiro Nozawa, arrangement by Satoru Osanai, song by Kyoko Tongu)
- Cast: Kyoko Tongu (Kikunosuke), Kosei Tomita (Daemon), Shigeru Chiba (Goemon), Taiki Matsuno (Kichiza), Tessho Genda (Naojiro)

== Live-action film ==
A live-action film titled Abashiri Ikka: The movie (あばしり一家 ＴＨＥ ＭＯＶＩＥ), starring actress Erika Tonooka (member of the group Idoling!!!) and directed by Teruyoshi Ishii, was released in Tokyo on November 21, 2009.

=== Staff and cast ===
- Studio: Total Media Corporation (TMC), Oscar
- Director: Teruyoshi Ishii
- Action director: Shingo Nishida
- Producer: Seiji Nanba, Hideo Iwashita
- Co-producer: Akio Motojima
- Assistant producer: Eisuke Ito, Shinichiro Yamaguchi
- Executive adviser: Jun Mimae
- Executive producer: Akihiko Yahata, Tsuguo Oikawa
- Planning: Takashi Shiotsuki
- Original work: Go Nagai
- Script: Sadayuki Murai
- Photography: Takehiro Kuramochi
- Editor: Hiroaki Niizuma
- Art: Nori Fukuda
- Lighting: Koji Hara
- Audio recording: Manabu Otsuka
- Production: Abashiri Family Production Committee
- Theme song: string (performed by eroica)
- Cast: Erica Tonooka (Kikunosuke), Shun Sugata (Daemon), Ijiri Okada (Goemon), Yakan Nabe (Kichiza), Kyoji Kamui (Naojiro), Jiro Sato (Danjuro Namakubi), Miwa (Kaoruko Unii/Mademoiselle Honey), Maria Yoshikawa (Yuki), Mai Endo (Mai)

== Legacy ==
The characters Daemon, Goemon, Kichiza, and Naojiro would all appear in Go Nagai's later series Cutie Honey. In it, Daemon became Hayami Danbei and Kichiza became Hayami Junpei. Naojiro later appeared as Danbei's nephew, and boss of Paradise School. Goemon appeared with Naojiro as a teacher of Paradise School.

Kikunosuke is in the Mazinger Angels manga as the pilot for Iron Z (which is in fact a new name for Energer Z, the Mazinger Z prototype). As well as traditional Mazinger and Grendizer characters Sayaka Yumi, Grace Maria Fleed, Hikaru Makiba and Jun Hono, as they fight Dr. Hell's forces and the Vegan Empire, respectively, Daemon also materializes under his Hayami Danbei alias in Grendizer. In Shin Mazinger, Cross, a cyborg similar to Naojiro, and his 'robot' form, have the same physical look to that of Naojiro.
