= Susumu Yoshikawa =

Japanese manga artist (born 1950)

Susumu Yoshikawa (よしかわ 進, Yoshikawa Susumu) (born July 6, 1950) is a Japanese manga artist and a former member of Dynamic Productions. His real name is Susumu Yoshikawa (葭川 進; same romaji and spelling, but written with Kanji instead of the Hiragana-Kanji combination of his pen name). Born in Hiroshima Prefecture, Japan on July 6, 1950, he served as an assistant to Go Nagai for some time, before making his professional debut in 1977 with Atsui Kuni Kara Kita Shojo for the summer vacation special issue 2 of the magazine Weekly Shonen Sunday of Shogakukan. His most representative works are Ojama Yurei-kun and Heroine-kun.

He is not to be confused with live-action/anime producer Susumu Yoshikawa who was born in 1935.
