= MazinSaga =

Manga

- Cover of MazinSaga #1 Italian edition (1999)

マジンサーガ (Majinsāga)
- Manga
- Written by: Go Nagai
- Published by: Shueisha (original); Fusosha (re-release)
- Magazine: Weekly Young Jump (1991–1992); Bears Club Natsunogo (1992; one story)
- Original run: 1991 – 1998
- Volumes: 3 (original); 6 (re-release)
- icon

MazinSaga (Japanese: マジンサーガ, Hepburn: Majinsāga) is a Japanese manga created by Go Nagai and based on Mazinger. It was originally serialized in Shueisha's seinen manga magazine Weekly Young Jump from 1991 to 1992 (with a one-shot chapter also published in the summer 1992 issue of Bears Club Natsunogo), with its chapters collected in three tankōbon volumes. Fushosa republished the series in 1997, and continued it with three additional volumes (totaling six volumes) until 1998. The series is unfinished, although Nagai stated in 2007 that it would be resumed in the future.

== Plot ==
MazinSaga tells the story of the young Koji Kabuto, a university student who finds a strange helmet that is the fruit of his late father's research. The helmet, named Z, also called the Armor of God, reacts to its user's will and spirit. When Koji wears it, the overwhelming power of Z causes it to violently destroy everything on Earth. After the armageddon, Koji is contacted by the spirit of his father who frees him from Z's influence. Waking up on a colonized Mars after being teleported by Z, Koji encounters Sayaka Yumi who tells him of the problems the colonies are facing. Koji decides to fight with Z to protect the colonies from several threats including the evil God Kaiser Hell.

== Video game ==
The manga has a video game for the Sega Mega Drive with the same name in Asia and Japan. It was called Mazin Saga Mutant Fighter in the US and Mazin Wars in Europe.
