= Great Mazinger =

Japanese media franchise

- Title card
- Genre: Mecha, adventure
- Creators: Go Nagai; Dynamic Productions
- Director: Tomoharu Katsumata
- Music: Michiaki Watanabe
- No. of episodes: 56

Production
- Fuji Television; Toei Animation

Original release
- Network: FNS (Fuji TV)
- Release: September 8, 1974 – September 28, 1975

Related
- Manga
- Written by: Go Nagai
- Published by: Kodansha
- Magazine: TV Magazine
- Original run: October 1974 – October 1975
- Volumes: 2
- Predecessor
- Mazinger Z (1972–1974)
- Sequel
- Mazinger Z: Infinity (2017 anime film)
- Other series
- List of all Mazinger series

Great Mazinger (グレートマジンガー, Gurēto Majingā) is a Japanese anime television series and manga comic book created by Go Nagai and Dynamic Productions. The story is a sequel and direct continuation of Mazinger Z series after its initial success. The series was aired on Japanese television in 1974, immediately following the end of the first Mazinger series. It ran for 56 episodes.

Mazinger Z: Infinity, a theatrical film sequel, taking place 10 years after this series, was animated by Toei Animation and released in theaters on January 13, 2018.

== Plot ==
The story centers on Tetsuya Tsurugi (剣 鉄也, Tsurugi Tetsuya), an orphan raised by Kenzo Kabuto (兜 剣造, Kabuto Kenzō), who is the once thought dead father of Mazinger Z pilot Kouji Kabuto. Kenzo Kabuto is the creator of the new and improved version of Mazinger, which was based on his father's "Chogokin Z" (Super Alloy Z). The new version was designed with a stronger form to fight against humanity's new enemy, the Mycenae Empire, led by the Great General of Darkness and his army of Battle Beasts. Kabuto, then, gives the Great Mazinger to Tetsuya for him to use. Accompanying him is his female companion, Jun Hono, an orphaned half Japanese, half African-American girl, in her feminine robot, "Venus A (Venus Ace)".

Tetsuya's training with Great Mazinger is completed just in time to come to Kabuto's aid as the Mycenae Battle Beasts overwhelm Mazinger Z. With the original Mazinger destroyed, Kabuto went to America to study space travel and left Japan's defense in the hands of Tetsuya and the Fortress of Science. Nevertheless, Tetsuya won against his fight with the Mycenae Battle Beasts, led by their military leader, Ankoku Daishogun (Great General of Darkness) after the Great General of Darkness' defeat, Doctor Hell of Mazinger Z went into disguise as the Great Marshall of Hell and leads the Mycenae forces.

== Production ==
=== Casting ===
Produced as a direct sequel to Mazinger Z, Great Mazinger also includes some cast members of the original series. This includes Shiro Kabuto (Kouji's little brother) and comic-relief robot Boss Borot. Discotek Media have licensed the series for a North American DVD release.

Originally, Great Mazinger was to be included in Jim Terry's Force Five series. However, it was eventually swapped out with Spaceketeers, and was never aired in the United States. As was in Mazinger Z, nevertheless, it was successfully broadcast in Italy, Mexico, and other Latin American countries, unedited.

=== Appraisal and spin-offs ===
Although Great Mazinger did not achieve the same astronomical ratings as Mazinger Z, it was still highly popular to run a very successful 56 weeks. In fact, it even spawned a line of best-selling toys and merchandise as did its predecessor, as well as several spin-off theatrical featurettes. For example, it paved way for the creation of UFO Robo Grendizer. In addition, footage from Great Mazinger's sole appearance in the final episode of Mazinger Z was aired as part of the US version of Mazinger Z, known as Tranzor Z. At that time, however, Great Mazinger had already been introduced to millions of American children under the name of Mazinga. As one of the imported products, the 24-inch Jumbo Machinder toys were released in the US by Mattel as part of their Shogun Warriors line in 1976.

Great Mazinger was also the star of the short theatrical "team-up movie features" released in Japan such as Great Mazinger versus Grendizer, and Great Mazinger versus Getter Robo G among others. They were based on the anime crossovers of the manga creations of Go Nagai. For example, Tetsuya pilots an earlier version of Mazinger Z called Energer Z.

Along with Jun, Tetsuya and the Great Mazinger are also featured in the Mazinkaiser OVA and Mazinkaiser: Death match! Ankoku Daishogun movie. The characters have been also a mainstay in Banpresto's Super Robot Wars, a popular battle-simulation/RPG series of video games based on many anime mecha shows. This includes the original Mazinger Z, Getter Robo, the Gundam series, and Neon Genesis Evangelion among others. Moreover, Tetsuya appears in Shin Mazinger Shougeki! Z Hen.

== Modern versions ==
=== 2002: OVA version ===
In the 2002 OVA Mazinkaiser, Tetsuya fights alongside Kouji against Doctor Hell's forces. The OVA version of Great Mazinger is physically identical to the original, but with black coloring on the arms and legs instead of blue. Great is seriously damaged during the initial battle in the series. Near the end of the OVA, Tetsuya returns with a new and much more powerful Great, which is discovered in Doctor Juzo Kabuto's laboratory.

=== 2003: Movie ===
Great also returns in the 2003 movie Mazinkaiser: Deathmatch! Ankoku Daishogun, where Tetsuya once more fights the Mycenae Empire using the prototype Great Mazinger for unknown reasons. Speculation is that both Mazinkaiser and Shin Great Mazinger were being upgraded in the Photon Labs, forcing Tetsuya to use the prototype Great Mazinger. This time, however, Great is incapacitated rather quickly, surviving battle but unable to continue fighting. Nevertheless, the battle did display Tetsuya's skill, as he was the only member of the Mazinger Army (made up of Great, Venus A and three mass-produced and significantly weaker versions of Mazinger Z) to defeat his attackers and survive. In the end, the newly upgraded Mazinkaiser was launched in space to rendezvous with the Kaiser Pilder. Mazinkaiser defeated Ankoku Daishogun and in the ending credits, we can see Mazinkaiser carrying the damaged Great Mazinger and Venus Ace.

=== 2009: TV series ===
In the 2009 Shin Mazinger Shougeki! Z Hen series, Tetsuya is an ace pilot noted for incredibly easy mastering control over Mazinger Z prototype, Energer Z. He has assisted Kabuto Kenzo and Juzo, Dr. Hell and Tsubasa Nishikiori in exploring Bardos Island. When Dr. Hell makes his first attempts for world domination, Tetsuya sacrifices his life, allowing Tsubasa to shoot Kenzo, who has been possessed by alien Kedora, killing them both. He is later revealed to be Tsubasa's lost brother and his ghost is summoned by Viscount Pygman to haunt her. In the first episode, "Blade", a mysterious figure with a bearing striking resemblance to Tetsuya in his pilot costume and face unseen, kills Pygman. A silhouette of Great Mazinger is seen behind Blade but before the narrator can introduce it, Detective Ankokuji interrupts him saying it is yet "another story". Great General of Darkness also appears in the first and last episodes of the series.

== The Battle Beasts of Mazinger ==
Battle Beasts
- Created by: Go Nagai
- Weapons: Varied (beams, missiles, bombs, swords, spears, axes, nets, acids, drills, etc.)
- Construction: Mystical alloy and organic parts
- Energy source: Geothermal

The Battle Beasts (or sentoujuu/ Warrior Beasts), are the monsters and evil mecha from Great Mazinger. In the story, the Warrior Beasts are the secret super-weapons of the Mikene Empire, an ancient empire driven underground centuries in the past.

=== Characteristics and history ===
Like their predecessors Mechanical Monsters (kikaiju), Battle Beasts are armed with a variety of weapons such as ray beams, missiles, bombs, swords, spears, axes, nets, acids and drills. However, they are made of mechanical parts combined with organic parts, and were controlled by human brains. For example, a Mikene's Warrior is permanently placed and interfaced with the Battle Beast body that he can move like his own. In a way, the Battle Beasts are like giant cyborgs. As a result of this, most of them have a distinctive human head or face placed on the mechanical body, usually somewhere on the torso or on the head itself.

They are far more powerful and thanks to their cyborg nature, they also have better reaction time, adaptability and skills than the Mechanical Beasts. Some of them are even capable of showing emotions or even speak. However, their cyborg nature is also a weakness: a direct hit on the human head or face can destroy or severely weaken the Warrior Beast.

Throughout the series, there is a little information about them. In episode 2, the idea of imprisonment has been used on traitors; they have free will, but some might prove as psychotic. In episode 9, the idea of personal relationships is known: Minister Argos claims that the warrior beast Cleo is his daughter. Although most of them have murderous personalities, few do not such as the battle beast Bruton in episode 10 and Kelvinius in episode 16. In episode 16, Kelvinius has flashbacks indicating that the original Mycenae Empire was once a peaceful nation with him as the prince. However, the Emperor of Darkness came into the picture and ordered human sized Talos units to take over the entire nation and convert everyone into battle beasts. In episode 52, the process of "fusion" between the human and the robot is hinted: Shinichiro Okida was merged by Marquis Janus with a robot to create the Battle Beast Jerunicas.

The seven armies

The Battle Beasts could be grouped into one of 7 categories, as the entire Mikene Empire's forces could be divided into 7 armies.

- Superhuman Battle Beasts: Led by General Julius Caesar, it is the largest of the seven armies. As the name suggests, most of this army's Battle Beasts are humanoid in shape. They often carry weapons such as swords, shields and spears. A whooping total of twenty-five appear in the series.
- Spectral Battle Beasts: Led by General Hadias, this army specializes in inspiring fear in the enemies of the Mikene Empire. This army's forces tend to take the form of demons or ghosts. A total of three appear in the series, making it the lowest count of any warrior beast type.
- Aerial Battle Beasts: The main air force of the Mikene Empire's forces, this army is led by General Birdler. Virtually every member of this army is winged, though some fly using thrusters or jets. A total of six appear in the series.
- Mammalian Battle Beasts: One of the Mikene Empire's ground forces, this army is led by the vile General Ligern. The Battle Beasts of this army are based on mammals, many of them being four-legged. Ramming targets seems to be a favorite tactic. An above average total of nine appear in the series.
- Reptilian Battle Beasts: Commanded by the dragon-like General Draydou, this army has a mix of air and ground troops. Being based on reptiles, the Battle Beasts of this unit tend to be more vicious than most. A total of six appear in the series.
- Aquatic Battle Beasts: The navy of the Mikene Empire is led by General Angoras. This army is strongest in the water, though many Warrior Beasts that are part of this army are amphibious. A total of six appear in the series.
- Insect Battle Beasts: Tough and adaptable, this army follows their leader General Scarabeth into battle. Like the Reptilian Battle Beast army, this force has a combination of air and ground troops; although leaning more towards air power. A total of four appear in the series, making them the second least common warrior beasts after spectral types.

All seven armies are beneath the supreme command of the Great General of Darkness. After his defeat and death at the hands of Great Mazinger, the Great Marshall of Hell took over the supreme command. However, it can be noted that there is an unofficial eighth battle beast army; the Chouhou or Multicapable/Intelligence (or convenience) Battle Beasts. These are more robotic and mechanical in nature than other Battle Beasts and displayed characteristics that could not be easily classified into one of the seven normal armies. In addition, they share the same name as Minister Argos, implying the robotic factor of the beasts. Another title for them could have also been Indeterminate Battle Beasts.

Monsters Dante (front), Saraga (left) and Raigon (right)

=== In other media ===
Various battle beasts have appeared in the majority of Super Robot Wars titles including Obeleus, Zugar, Psychoveia, Gracious, Tollukan, Dolark, Jerunicas, Jiran, Dukaider, Gogler, Gold Phoenix, and Vulcania from the series and Dante, Saraga, and Arsoth from Mazinger Z vs. The Great General of Darkness; the Mazinkaiser version of Dante and Psychoveia are the only true battle beasts in Super Robot Wars Judgment and W with others being the seven generals of the Mikene Empire led by the Great General of Darkness.

The generals Julicaeser, Birdler, Hadias, and Draydou have few appearances, the former two only having their original versions appear in Super Robot Wars Alpha 2 while the latter two also appear in Super Robot Wars 4. All seven generals appear in their Mazinkaiser versions in Super Robots Wars Judgment and Super Robots Wars W, although only Draydou, Birdler, and Hadias are actual units.

=== Great Mazinger Weapons ===
- Atomic Punch - アトミック パンチ: Great Mazinger launches his fist, together with his forearm, giving a spinning effect to make the impact of the fist very powerful.
- Mazinger Blade - マジンガー ブレード: From his legs, a couple of swords can be launched, for melee attacks or duels.
- Great Boomerang - グレート ブーメラン: The great red "V" plate on his chest can be picked up and thrown at enemies, with a boomerang effect.
- Navel Missile - ネーブル ミサイル: From his waist, the light blue cell is opened, and a strong missile is launched from there.
- Great Typhoon - グレート タイフーン: From Great Mazinger's mouth, a powerful breath of wind is sent off, strong enough to lift up even a giant monsters.
- Breast Burn - ブレスト バーン: From is great red "V" plate on his chest, a powerful heating beam is cast off. It can be converted to be a glacial beam.
- Thunder Break - サンダー ブレイク: Great Mazinger signature move. From his antennas on his ears, an electric beam is sent to the sky. Those beams makes the clouds to electrify and to send giant thunderbolts on the earth. Some of this thunderbolts are caught by Great Mazingers antennas, and this tremendous energy is released from his finger or the tip of Mazinger Blade to the enemy, most probably killing it instantly.
- Drill Pressure Punch - ドリル プレッシャー パンチ: In order to make the Atomic Punch more dangerous, this is, later in the series, powered up by a set of sharp blades that make their appearance on the forearm only before the attack, making the Atomic Punch to be more powerful than the normal Atomic Punch.
- Back Spin Kick - バック スピン キック: In order to make the Great Mazinger flawless, the professors discovered that Great Mazinger's weak points are his legs, because there are no weapon on them. So, in order to correct this fault, a giant round blade appears from the knee to the foot, to make his kicks very powerful. However, this weapon is used rarely.
- Knee Impulse Kick - ニー インパルス キック: As just said, together with Back Spin Kick, another weapon is discovered for Great Mazinger's legs. From the plate on his knee, a metal tip is shown from his knees, in order to make his knee strike more powerful. However, this weapon is used rarely.
- Great Booster - グレート ブースター: Great Mazinger's best weapon and improvement. A separated jet is built and dispatched from the base, to fuse with great Mazinger "Scranduru Jet" and to improve his top speed. This improvement is also a weapon because it can be dispatched from Great Mazinger to the enemy, destroying it at impact. His sharpened wings may cut through enemies. The Great Booster is equipped with laser cannons, rarely used.

== See also ==
- UFO Robot Grendizer vs. Great Mazinger
- Grendizer, Getter Robot G, Great Mazinger: Kessen! Daikaijuu
