= Grendizer =

Japanese Super Robot anime television series and manga

- UFO Robot Grendizer
- Title card

UFOロボ グレンダイザー (Yūfō Robo Gurendaizā)
- Genre: Mecha
- Created by: Go Nagai
- Manga
- Written by: Go Nagai
- Published by: Kodansha
- Magazine: TV Magazine
- Original run: October 1975 – May 1976
- Volumes: 2
- Manga
- Written by: Go Nagai
- Illustrated by: Gosaku Ota
- Published by: Akita Shoten
- Magazine: Boken Oh
- Original run: October 1975 – March 1977
- Volumes: 5
- Manga
- Written by: Go Nagai
- Illustrated by: Eiji Imamichi
- Published by: Tokuma Shoten
- Magazine: TV Land
- Original run: October 1975 – March 1977
- Volumes: 1
- Anime television series
- Directed by: Tomoharu Katsumata
- Written by: Shozo Uehara
- Music by: Shunsuke Kikuchi
- Studio: Toei Animation
- Original network: FNS (Fuji TV)
- Original run: October 5, 1975 – February 27, 1977
- Episodes: 74
- Anime film
- Directed by: Yoichi Kominato
- Produced by: Masahisa Saeki
- Written by: Shozo Uehara
- Music by: Shunsuke Kikuchi
- Studio: Toei Animation
- Released: December 20, 1975
- Runtime: 24 minutes
- Manga
- Written by: Go Nagai
- Illustrated by: Yu Okazaki
- Published by: Kodansha
- Magazine: TV Magazine
- Original run: June 1976 – March 1977
- Volumes: 1
- Anime film

UFO Robot Grendizer: Akai Yuuhi no Taiketsu
- Directed by: Tokiji Kaburaki
- Produced by: Chiaki Imada
- Written by: Tatsuo Tamura
- Music by: Shunsuke Kikuchi
- Studio: Toei Animation
- Released: December 19, 1976
- Runtime: 24 minutes
- Manga

Grendizer Giga
- Written by: Go Nagai
- Published by: Akita Shoten
- Magazine: Champion Red
- Original run: September 2014 – July 2015
- Volumes: 2
- Video game

The Feast of the Wolves
- Developer: Endroad
- Publisher: Microids; 3Goo (Japan)
- Genre: Open world, Action
- Platform: PlayStation 4 PlayStation 5 Xbox One; Xbox Series X and Series S Nintendo Switch; Microsoft Windows (Steam)
- Released: Steam/PlayStation/Xbox: WW: November 14, 2023; JP: April 18, 2024; Nintendo Switch: WW: October 10, 2024
- Manga

Grendizer U: The Inception
- Written by: Go Nagai
- Illustrated by: 8KEY
- Published by: Hero's Inc.
- Magazine: Comiplex
- Original run: June 28, 2024 – present
- Anime television series

Grendizer U
- Directed by: Mitsuo Fukuda (chief); Shun Kudō
- Written by: Ichirō Ōkouchi; Tatsuto Higuchi
- Music by: Kohei Tanaka
- Studio: Gaina
- Licensed by: EU: Manga Productions
- Original network: TV Tokyo, BS TV Tokyo, AT-X
- Original run: July 5, 2024 – September 28, 2024
- Episodes: 13
- icon

UFO Robot Grendizer (UFOロボ グレンダイザー, Yūfō Robo Gurendaizā), also known as Grandizer, UFO Robot Grendizer Raids, Goldrake and Goldorak, is a Japanese manga and animated television series created by Go Nagai. The series is the third entry in the Mazinger series, later relegated into a spinoff series. The series is produced by Toei Doga and Dynamic Planning, directed by Tomoharu Katsumata, and written by Shozo Uehara. It aired on Fuji TV from October 5, 1975, to February 27, 1977. The mecha's first appearance in the United States was as a part of the Shogun Warriors line of super robot toys imported in the late 1970s by Mattel, then in Jim Terry's Force Five series. A remake of the original anime series, Grendizer U, aired from July to September 2024.

== Plot ==
The Vega homeworld has become unstable due to the exploiting of Vegatron, a powerful radioactive ore. Seeking to expand his militaristic empire and find a substitute planet to settle upon, the ruthless King Vega unleashes his armies—composed of flying saucers and giant robotic monsters—and turns first against neighbors such as Fleed, a highly advanced but peaceful world. The once verdant, idyllic Fleed is turned into a radioactive wasteland. Too late, the only known survivor of the royal family, the Crown Prince Duke Fleed, manages to steal the Grendizer, the robotic embodiment of the Fleedian God of War, from the Vegan invaders who plan to use it to spearhead their invasion fleet. Grendizer is a giant monster robot that interfaces with Spacer (Spaizer), a flying saucer that enables the robot to fly.

Fleeing Vegan space by flying at faster than light speed, the Duke enters the Solar System and switches course to Earth, making a rough landing in Japan, on the slopes of Mount Fuji. He is befriended by Doctor Umon, a noted scientist who oversees a research laboratory called the Space Science Lab near a small ranch. The kindly Umon takes in the young humanoid alien as his son, under the assumed name of Daisuke, and assists him in hiding Grendizer. Taking the name Daisuke Umon, Duke Fleed works at the ranch run by Danbei Makiba (based on Abashiri Daemon of Go Nagai's manga Abashiri Ikka).

Roughly two years later, Koji Kabuto, after studying abroad, returns to Japan in a flying saucer he personally designed and built, called the TFO. He heads to the Space Science Lab after hearing of multiple sightings of "flying saucers". He plans to contact the aliens if possible and make peace with them. Daisuke, however, scoffs at the notion and fears that these aliens, the Vegans, led by generals Blaki and Gandal, are preparing to attack Earth. Koji ignores his warnings and flies out to meet the incoming saucers, only to discover the horrible truth. In order to save Koji and protect his adoptive homeworld from destruction, Daisuke is forced to return to his true identity as Duke Fleed. He unearths Grendizer from its hiding place under the lab and sets off to fight his enemies.

The Vegans establish a base on the far side of the Moon and start to attack Earth from there. Koji discovers Duke Fleed's true identity and their bitter rivalry soon turns to friendship. The daughter of Danbei Makiba, Hikaru, also discovers Daisuke's secret and becomes a pilot in order to assist him despite his objections. Later on, it is revealed that there were two more survivors from planet Fleed: Duke's younger sister Maria Grace Fleed and a man who had rescued her and fled to Earth, raising her under the guise of her grandfather. Caught in a crossfire between Grendizer and a Vegan beast, he reveals to Maria that she is the last survivor of the royal family of Fleed (under the belief that Duke was killed) before dying from his wounds. Maria swears revenge on Grendizer and its pilot. She tries to ambush Duke, Koji and Hikaru at the Space Science Lab, but the fight is short. Maria's attacks bring Duke's necklace (which is the same as the one she wore) into view and the truth is revealed. The lost siblings are reunited at last and Maria becomes the last addition to the team.

As the conflict nears its end, it is shown that Duke Fleed was engaged to King Vega's daughter, Princess Rubina, prior to the attack on Fleed. When Rubina discovers that planet Fleed is no longer polluted with Vegatron radiation and that her fiancé is alive and well, she rushes to Earth to bring him the good news. Unfortunately, one of King Vega's generals uses this opportunity to ambush Duke Fleed, and Rubina is killed when she takes a shot aimed at Duke. This makes Duke even more determined to wipe out the Vegan menace once and for all.

King Vega decides to gather his remaining forces and make an all-out attack on Earth, destroying the Moon Base to coax his troops into fighting to the end and finally succeed in invading Earth and taking it as their new home planet. Duke and company go out to intercept them in Grendizer and the newly designed space combat Spazers. After a fierce battle, they finally manage to destroy the Vegan mother ship along with King Vega himself. Soon afterwards, Duke and Maria bid a tearful farewell to Earth and their friends and return to help reconstruct planet Fleed.

== Production ==
UFO Robo Grendizer's origins dates back to Uchu Enban Daisenso (宇宙円盤大戦争, Uchū Enban Daisensō), translated and also known as Battlefield of The Space Saucers and The Great Battle of the Flying Saucers, a 1975 animated short film created by Go Nagai and produced by Toei Doga. It is also known as Space Disk War and was also released in Italy under the name UFO Robot Gattaiger-La grande battaglia dei dischi spaziali. It was originally shown along with the short film Great Mazinger tai Getter Robot G: Kuchu Daigekitotsu, also from Toei and Nagai.

Nagai and Dynamic Productions created Grendizer using some of the elements and characters from Daiseno including Duke, the Makiba family, and even Blaki. Some changes were made to make it more original. The most obvious are the changes in design and the addition of characters such as Koji Kabuto and Maria Fleed.

UFO Robot Grendizer was developed to be a sequel to Great Mazinger after the initial concepts of a sequel were rejected by Toei. With the appearance of Uchu Enban Daisenso at the March 1975 Toei Manga Festival a remake was pitched using elements from Mazinger. To breathe new light into the series, the villains of the series were decided to be aliens, a trend that followed in other Toei mecha series while also making Duke a more Blue Blood character with his suit being based on a knight including more romantic elements with its characters and sense of adventure.

Go Nagai, however, at one point stated in an interview that the anime series was considered a fun side project and does not consider Grendizer to be part of the series timeline. This is mainly because he had many disagreements with Toei and Shingo Araki over the direction the show should take as well has Toei not paying him royalties for the show's overseas airings, which culminated in a 1986 court settlement that lead to Toei paying Nagai his royalty earnings. In the end, UFO Robo Grendizer is more of a stand-alone spin-off in the Mazinger universe.

== Media ==
=== Anime ===
The series was first aired on Fuji TV from October 5, 1975, to February 27, 1977, with a total count of 74 episodes. Replacing Great Mazinger in its initial timeslot. Isao Sasaki performed both the show's opening and ending themes: "Tobe! Grendizer" (とべ!グレンダイザー, Tobe! Gurendaizā; "Fly! Grendizer") (with Columbia Yurikago-kai and Ko'orogi '73) and "Uchuu no Yuusha Grendizer" (宇宙の勇者グレンダイザー, Uchū no Yūsha Gurendaizā; "Grendizer, Hero of Space"). Shunsuke Kikuchi composed the music for the series.

==== Japanese cast ====
- Kei Tomiyama as Daisuke Umon / Duke Fleed
- Hiroya Ishimaru as Kōji Kabuto
- Jōji Yanami as Dr. Genzō Umon / King of Vega
- Kōsei Tomita as Danbei Makiba / Gandal
- Chiyoko Kawashima as Hikaru Makiba
- Kazuko Sawada as Gorō Makiba / Lady Gandal
- Rihoko Yoshida as Maria Grace Fleed

==== Episodes ====
#	Air date	Title	Saucer Beast/Vega Monster
1	10/5/1975	兜甲児とデュークフリード (Koji Kabuto and Duke Fleed)	円盤獣・ギルギル (Saucer Beast Girugiru)
2	10/12/1975	ああ! わが大地みどりなりき (Ah! My Land That Was So Green)	円盤獣・ガメガメ (Saucer Beast Gamegame)
3	10/19/1975	危機迫る白樺牧場 (Crisis Approaches Makiba Ranch)	円盤獣・バルバル (Saucer Beast Barubaru)
4	10/26/1975	若き血潮は紅に燃ゆ (Young Blood Burning Crimson)	円盤獣・ゴルゴル (Saucer Beast Gorugoru)
5	11/2/1975	炎の愛を夕陽に染めて (Flames of Love Dyed In The Sunset)	円盤獣・ドムドム (Saucer Beast Domudomu)
6	11/9/1975	大空を斬る闘魂 (Fighting Spirit Kills The Sky)	円盤獣・ダムダム (Saucer Beast Damudamu)
7	11/16/1975	たとえ我が命つきるとも (Even If It Costs My Life!)	円盤獣・ギンギン & 円盤獣・フイフイ (Saucer Beasts Gingin & Fuifui)
8	11/23/1975	地球の緑はあたたかい (The Warm, Green Earth)	円盤獣・ダルダル (Saucer Beast Darudaru)
9	11/30/1975	許されざる怒りを越えて (Beyond Unforgiven Anger)	円盤獣・ジルジル (Saucer Beast Jirujiru)
10	12/7/1975	あこがれは星の彼方に (Longing Beyond The Stars)	円盤獣・グリグリ (Saucer Beast Guriguri)
11	12/14/1975	黒い太陽の中の悪魔!! (The Demon In The Black Sun!!)	円盤獣・バリバリ (Saucer Beast Baribari)
12	12/21/1975	虹の橋を渡る少女 (The Girl Across The Rainbow Bridge)	円盤獣・ガニガニ (Saucer Beast Ganigani)
13	12/28/1975	狙われたグレンダイザー (Grendizer Under Fire)	円盤獣・ゲルゲル (Saucer Beast Gerugeru)
14	1/4/1976	ボスボロットがやって来た!! (Boss Borot Is Here!!)	円盤獣・ドリドリ (Saucer Beast Doridori)
15	1/11/1976	遥かなる母への手紙 (A Letter To My Mother, Far, Far Away)	円盤獣・ガルガル (Saucer Beast Garugaru)
16	1/18/1976	こころにひびく愛の鐘 (Here, A Bell Resonates With Love)	円盤獣・フルフル (Saucer Beast Furufuru)
17	1/25/1976	小さな生命を救え! (Save A Tiny Life!)	円盤獣・ギバギバ (Saucer Beast Gibagiba)
18	2/1/1976	発進! 秘密ルート7 (Launch! Secret Route 7)	円盤獣・ガデガデ (Saucer Beast Gadegade)
19	2/8/1976	恐怖のエアロライト! (The Terrifying Aerolight!)	円盤獣・ゴズゴズ (Saucer Beast Gozugozu)
20	2/15/1976	決死の雪山脱出作戦 (The Desperate Snowbound Escape Operation)	円盤獣・ベドベド (Saucer Beast Bedobedo)
21	2/22/1976	決戦! オーロラの輝き (Decisive Battle! The Shining Aurora)	円盤獣・ゲドゲド (Saucer Beast Gedogedo)
22	2/29/1976	花一輪の勇気 (The Courage Of A Single Flower)	円盤獣・ギロギロ (Saucer Beast Girogiro)
23	3/7/1976	激流に叫ぶひかる (Hikaru's Screaming Torrent)	円盤獣・ギスギス (Saucer Beast Gisugisu)
24	3/14/1976	危うしデュークフリード! (Watch Out, Duke Fleed!)	円盤獣・ドグドグ (Saucer Beast Dogudogu)
Movie	3/20/1976	Grendizer vs. Great Mazinger	Jinji/Gubigubi/Koakoa
25	3/21/1976	大空に輝く愛の花 (The Flower of Love Shines In Space)	円盤獣・ダリダリ (Saucer Beast Daridari)
26	3/28/1976	スカルムーン総出撃! (Skullmoon: Full Mobilization!)	円盤獣・ウルウル, ギドギド & ハドハド (Saucer Beasts Uruuru, Gidogido & Hadohado)
27	4/4/1976	猛攻撃! グレンダイザー (Onslaught! Grendizer)	円盤獣・ウルウル & ハドハド (Saucer Beasts Uruuru & Hadohado)
28	4/11/1976	闇夜に響く悪魔のベル (The Devil's Bell Tolls At Midnight)	円盤獣・ベルベル (Saucer Beast Beruberu)
29	4/18/1976	さらば 宇宙の友よ! (Farewell, My Friend In Space!)	円盤獣・デラデラ (Saucer Beast Deradera)
30	4/25/1976	赤い傷跡のバラード (The Ballad Of A Red Scar)	円盤獣・ゴダゴダ (Saucer Beast Godagoda)
31	5/2/1976	空に花咲け! ボスの友情 (A Flower Blooms In The Sky! Boss' Friendship)	円盤獣・ライライ (Saucer Beast Rairai)
32	5/9/1976	母に向って撃て! (Shoot At Your Mother!)	円盤獣・ザウザウ (Saucer Beast Zauzau)
33	5/16/1976	必殺! ミュータントの最後 (Sure Kill! The Mutant's End)	円盤獣・ザリザリ (Saucer Beast Zarizari)
34	5/23/1976	狼の涙は流れ星 (The Wolf's Tears Are Falling Stars)	円盤獣・ゴメゴメ & ゴンゴン (Saucer Beasts Gomegome & Gongon)
35	5/30/1976	飛べ! ダブルスペイザー (Fly! Double Spazer)	円盤獣・ブンブン (Saucer Beast Bunbun)
36	6/6/1976	燃える大空の誓い! (An Oath To The Blazing Skies!)	円盤獣・ジラジラ (Saucer Beast Jirajira)
37	6/13/1976	翼にいのちをかけろ! (Bet Everything On The Wings Of Life!)	円盤獣・ガンガン (Saucer Beast Gangan)
38	6/20/1976	ひかる、涙のドッキング! (Hikaru, The Engagement of Tears)	円盤獣・ドイドイ (Saucer Beast Doidoi)
39	6/27/1976	奇襲! ベガ星突撃隊 (Surprise Attack! The Assault Troops of Planet Vega)	円盤獣・ウラウラ (Saucer Beast Ullaulla)
40	7/4/1976	激突!炎の海原 (Clash! The Fiery Ocean)	円盤獣・ブイブイ (Saucer Beast Buibui)
41	7/11/1976	マリンスペイザー出動せよ! (Marine Spazer, Intervene!)	円盤獣・ガモガモ (Saucer Beast Gamogamo)
42	7/18/1976	危機! 研究所よ立ち上がれ (Crisis! The Research Institute To The Rescue!)	円盤獣・ガウガウ (Saucer Beast Gaugau)
43	7/25/1976	隕石落下! 謎の孤島 (Meteor At The Lonely Isle!)	円盤獣・グメグメ (Saucer Beast Gumegume)
44	8/1/1976	祭りの夜円盤獣が来る! (Festival Night! Here Comes The Disc-Robot)	円盤獣・ドズドズ (Saucer Beast Dozudozu)
45	8/8/1976	燃えろ! ドリルスペイザー (Fire Up! The Drill Spazer)	円盤獣・ゴドゴド (Saucer Beast Godogodo), ベガ星蟻 (Vega Star Ants)
46	8/15/1976	空からサメが降って来た!! (The Sharks Falling From The Sky!!)	円盤獣・ガリガリ (Saucer Beast Garigari)
47	8/22/1976	湖が地獄の火を吐いた! (The Lake Erupts The Hell-Fire!)	円盤獣・ガドガド (Saucer Beast Gadogado)
48	8/29/1976	地の底に悪魔がいた! (The Demon In The Earth's Depths)	円盤獣・ダクダク (Saucer Beast Dakudaku)
49	9/5/1976	赤い夕陽に兄を見た! (I Saw My Big Brother In The Crimson Sunset!) (Note: Shown at the Toei Manga Festival event on 19.12.1976 under the changed title Akai Yuuhi no Taiketsu (赤い夕陽の対決))	円盤獣・デキデキ (Saucer Beast Dekideki)
50	9/12/1976	暗殺!! 兜甲児を消せ (Murder!! Eliminate Koji Kabuto!)	円盤獣・フビフビ (Saucer Beast Fubifubi)
51	9/19/1976	大接近!! 悪魔の星 (It's Coming!! The Demon's Star)	円盤獣・ガレガレ (Saucer Beast Garegare)
52	9/26/1976	ベガ大王軍団大移動! (The Massive Shift of The Vegan Army!)	円盤獣・グルグル (Saucer Beast Guruguru), 円盤獣・ドモドモ (Saucer Beast Domodomo), ベガ獣・キングゴリ (Vega Monster King Gori)
53	10/3/1976	死闘! キングゴリを倒せ (The Desperate Fight! Defeat King Gori)	ベガ獣・キングゴリ (Vega Monster King Gori)
54	10/10/1976	謎の恐怖! 日本海溝 (Mysterious Terror! The Ocean Trench of Japan)	ベガ獣・バニバニ (Vega Monster Banibani)
55	10/17/1976	恐怖! 悪魔の怪気球 (Assault! The Mysterious Sinister Spheres)	ベガ獣・グレグレ (Vega Monster Guregure)
56	10/24/1976	危機を呼ぶ偽博士! (The Warning of the Fake Scientist)	ベガ獣・ダイダイ (Vega Monster Daidai), ベガ獣・ザミザミ (Vega Monster Zamizami)
57	10/31/1976	吼えろ! ぼくの怪獣 (Roar! My Monster)	ベガ獣・ブドブド (Vega Monster Budobudo)
58	11/07/1976	悪魔にされたグレンダイザー! (Grendizer, The Demon!)	ベガ獣・ベニベニ (Vega Monster Benibeni)/偽グレンダイザー (False Grendizer)
59	11/14/1976	ああ! 少年コマンド隊 (Ha! The Boy Commands)	ベガ獣・ダキダキ (Vega Monster Dakidaki)
60	11/21/1976	午後七時東京タワー爆発!! (Tokyo Tower, 7PM: Explosion!)	ベガ獣・ズネズネ (Vega Monster Zunezune)
61	11/28/1976	特攻スパイ大作戦! (The Great Spy Strategy!)	ベガ獣・グワグワ (Vega Monster Guwaguwa)
62	12/5/1976	戦慄! 白鳥が来た日 (Tremble! The Day of Cygnus has come)	ベガ獣・ゴエゴエ (Vega Monster Goegoe)
63	12/12/1976	雪に消えた少女キリカ (Kirika, the young girl that disappeared in the snow)	ベガ獣・ズメズメ (Vega Monster Zumezume)
64	12/19/1976	東京全滅五分前! (Five minutes before Tokyo's total destruction!)	ベガ獣・グドグド (Vega Monster Gudogudo)
65	12/26/1976	兜甲児一本勝負! (Koji Kabuto's Single Match)	ベガ獣・ザスザス (Vega Monster Zasuzasu)
66	1/2/1977	死の海底400M（メートル）! (Undersea Base of Death – 400 M!)	ベガ獣・ワグワグ (Vega Monster Waguwagu)
67	1/9/1977	決死の海底基地爆破 (Suicidal Explosion of the Undersea Base)	ベガ獣・イブイブ (Vega Monster Ebeebe), ベガ獣・ラグラグ (Vega Monster Raguragu)
68	1/16/1977	吹雪の中のマリア (Maria in the Blizzard)	ベガ獣・ブエブエ (Vega Monster Buebue)
69	1/23/1977	父に捧げる愛のオーロラ (Father Offers an Aurora of Love)	ベガ獣・ガイガイ (Vega Monster Gaigai)
70	1/30/1977	涙は胸の奥深く (Tears from the deep of the heart)	ベガ獣・ガビガビ (Vega Monster Gabigabi)
71	2/6/1977	悲劇の親衛隊長モルス (Tragedy of Elite Bodyguard Mors)	ベガ獣・ジガジガ (Vega Monster Jigajiga)
72	2/13/1977	はるかなる故郷の星 (Our so-distant home star)	None
73	2/20/1977	この美しい地球のために (In the name of the beautiful Earth)	ベガ獣・グラグラ (Vega Monster Gragra)
74	2/27/1977	永遠に輝け! 二つの星 (Shine forever! The two stars)	ベガ獣・グラグラ (Vega Monster Gragra)

==== Grendizer U ====
A reboot of the original anime series, titled Grendizer U (グレンダイザーU, Gurendaizā U), was announced on August 5, 2023. It was produced by Gaina and directed by Shun Kudō with Mitsuo Fukuda serving as chief director, Nagai serving as executive producer, Ichirō Ōkouchi overseeing and writing series scripts alongside Tatsuto Higuchi, Yoshiyuki Sadamoto designing the characters, Kō Inaba, AF_KURO and Junichi Akutsu providing mechanical designs and Kohei Tanaka composing the music. It aired from July 5 to September 28, 2024, on all TX Network-affiliated stations in Japan. The opening theme song is "Kaishin no Ichigeki" performed by Glay, while the ending theme song is "Protect You" performed by Band-Maid.

=== Home media ===
Cover art for the first DVD volume of Grendizer

Toei released the entire series in Japan on DVD from May 21 to October 21, 2006. In 2013, following an agreement with Toei, an official "fully remastered and uncensored" DVD release of the complete series is available on French-speaking countries following the controversy regarding the unlicensed DVD releases by Manga Distribution and Déclic Images which resulted to a court ruling to pay €7,200,000 back to Toei. The series has also aired on the French Mangas anime TV channel. The entire Arabic dub is available on Istikana, a paid streaming service that has On-Demand Arab movies and TV shows.

=== Manga ===
The manga adaptation was serialized in several magazines in Japan, notably in Akita Shoten's Boken Oh magazine from October 1975 to March 1977. A remake of the series, titled Grendizer Giga (グレンダイザー ギガ, Gurendaizā Giga) was serialized in Akita Shoten's Champion Red magazine from September 2014 to July 2015. Two tankobon volumes were released.

Grendizer makes several cameos in other media, one in 2002 in the sixth chapter of Dynamic Superobot Wars and in 2004 in Dynamic Heroes, also known as Nagai Go Manga Gaiden—Dynamic Heroes (永井豪まんが外伝 ダイナミックヒーローズ, Nagai Gô Manga Gaiden Dainamikku Hîrôzu) and as Go Nagai Manga Heroes Crossover Collection—Dynamic Heroes, a Japanese manga based on several works of Go Nagai, including most of his most famous robots, such as Mazinger Z, Getter Robot and Great Mazinger. It was originally published as a monthly manga magazine e-manga from Kodansha, from June 2004 to July 2007. The latest iteration, Grendizer U, will be published in English in 2026 by Titan Manga.

=== Video games ===
Characters from the series also appeared in several installments of Banpresto's (now Bandai Namco Entertainment) popular crossover video game series Super Robot Wars, making its debut in the second installment of the franchise, 2nd Super Robot Wars. In recent years, however, Grendizer has made far less appearances in the mainline games but has recently been making a comeback starting with Super Robot Wars MX.

An open world action video game adaptation titled UFO Robot Grendizer: The Feast of the Wolves (UFOロボ グレンダイザー たとえ我が命つきるとも, Yūfō Robo Gurendaizā Tatoe Waga Inochi Tsukirutomo) was announced by French video game publisher Microids in February 2021. The game was developed by Endroad and was released worldwide for Steam, PlayStation 4, PlayStation 5, Xbox One and Xbox Series X and Series S on November 14, 2023, while it released in Japan on April 18, 2024. Nintendo Switch port was released on October 10, 2024.

=== Toys ===
Japanese Toy company Popy released several toys based on the mechs on the series in the show's initial run in Japan under both the Chogokin and Jumbo Machinder labels, which were later released in the United States in the late 1970s by Mattel as part of the Shogun Warriors line of super robot toys. The titular mecha is also included in Bandai's line of Soul of Chogokin figures, starting with the GX-04 Grendizer.

== Cultural impact ==
Grendizer was the second longest running animated Mazinger series in Japan, having 74 episodes. However, it has been criticized about its connection to the other Mazinger series in the franchise, especially with Koji's status as a mere sidekick and giving him a different romantic interest who was not Sayaka, as well as the lack of the other Mazinger mechs.

This created the popular assumption that the anime was not a success in Japan, especially since the merchandise based on the anime did not sell as well as the merchandise for both Mazinger Z and Great Mazinger. However, Go Nagai disputes this, saying the anime was actually quite successful in Japan: "It was actually a hit in Japan. Maybe some people thought it was not as popular as Mazinger Z, because Mazinger was super popular." The average viewership metrics for UFO Robot Grendizer's original Japanese broadcast was around 20.9% audience share across its 74 episodes with a peak share of 27.6% for Episode 21.

Regardless of its disputed success in Japan, Grendizer was one of the first anime programs to be a major success in both Europe and the Arabic regions of the Middle East, and continues to have a strong following in those parts of the world to this day. It only had limited success in the United States, where it was one of 5 mecha shows included in the 1980 TV anthology Force Five. The series was renamed Grandizer for the American market, and only had 26 episodes, which were run out of order. This was also the version of the show broadcast in the United Kingdom, India, and the Philippines. An earlier local Filipino English dub of the show existed before it was taken off the air by orders of the Ferdinand Marcos regime.

=== Europe ===
In Europe, Grendizer was a major success in France and Italy, known as Goldorak and Goldrake respectively. In Italy, the Italian dub theme songs were among the best-selling singles of 1978, with the first selling over 700,000 copies and the second selling over 1,000,000 copies. It would also get its own comic series titled Atlas UFO Robot Presenta Goldrake (Atlas UFO Robot Presents Goldrake), whose story diverged even further from the source material. This comic ran for 89 issues and spawned several other similar comic adaptations of anime airing on Italian television at that time.

The French dub was the first anime series to be telecast in France and legend goes that the series was so popular among French viewers that several episodes scored a 100% TV rating. Like the Italian dub, it changed all of the characters' names and inserted additional songs, although it did translate the series' original opening and ending themes into French. Some versions of the dub have a completely different theme simply titled "Goldorak", which was sung by Franco-Israeli singer Noam Kaniel. Kaniel's performance earned him unprecedented celebrity status in France; by the time Goldorak had ended its original run on French TV, its theme song achieved platinum status in France. The Francophone dub was also one of the first anime programs to be a major success in Canada where it was broadcast on Quebec's TVA network. The show continues to have a strong following, garnering widespread news coverage of its DVD release and return to broadcast TV in Canada. In October 2021 a fully licensed French-language Goldorak graphic novel was released by Editions Kana. According to the creative team, Go Nagai himself gave his blessings to the comics story, which serves as a sequel to the original Toei anime set 10 years after the final episode. The comic has received positive reviews from readers for its detailed art and a story that keeps the spirit of the original series. To coincide with the graphic novel's release, the French postal company, La Poste issued stamps inspired by the anime.

UFO Robot Grendizer Raid was released theatrically as Goldorak and became a hit at the French box office, selling 922,964 tickets upon release in 1979.

=== Arab world ===
In Arab countries, the show was extremely popular, first airing in war-torn Lebanon on Télé Liban in 1979 under the title مغامرات الفضاء: يوفو – غرندايزر (Moughamarat Al Fada: UFO – Grendizer, Adventures In Space: UFO – Grendizer) before being distributed to most other Arabic speaking regions. Unlike the Italian and French dubs, the Arabic dub retained the characters' names and kept songs from the Japanese version. Unlike most other Arabic dubs of anime, the show retained most of its plot details without any alteration or censorship in most Arabic-speaking markets, although some markets—such as Saudi Arabia and the UAE did censor certain scenes.

The Arabic language version of Grendizer was so popular when it first aired that it spawned several long-running Grendizer comics published for the Arabic market. Many of these were translations of the Italian-produced comics, the most well known of these being for the Lebanese comics anthology ما وراء الكون (Ma'Wara El Koun, Beyond The Universe). The magazine founded by Lebanese publisher Bassat Al Reeh (Flying Carpet) and headed by the company's editor Henry Matthews, published Arabic translations of science fiction comics ranging from one-off short stories to licensed Star Trek, Star Wars, and Marvel superhero comics, as well as TV licensed comics adaptations like Six Million Dollar Man and The Bionic Woman. Grendizer did not make its appearance until the fifth issue, but was so popular that it became the top feature on the title, running for 140 issues. It later spawned its own comic series titled مغامرات غرندايزر (Moghamarat Grendizer, Grendizer Adventures) that ran for over 70 issues. The series' popularity continues on in the region, as Arab News journalist Hala Tashkandi stated; "Grendizer memorabilia still sell like hot cakes in the region, and its popularity has barely declined." Lebanese pop star Sami Clark, who sang the Arabic version of the opening and ending in the Arabic dub, had frequently sung the theme in his concerts, including an orchestral rendering in 2018 . Clark also performed a duet with the singer of the original Japanese themes, Issao Sasaki, at the 2019 Saudi Anime Expo. There's even a store in Kuwait that started out mainly selling Grendizer merchandise, before expanding to selling other anime merchandise. In 2016, a Kuwaiti volunteer group made a Grendizer mural in Kuwait City during Urban Culture Week. Karim El Mufti, a professor of political science, said in his article about the anime, "UFO Robo Grendizer has surpassed the initial expectations of its producers. Although the conversion works of the original Japanese version into Arabic had kept the Japanese phonetics, sites and cultural references, the cartoon has actually blossomed into a life of its own. As such, the domestication process of this character and of its whole narrative set was intimately connected to the Arab context and politics at the inception moment of the series, thus mirroring the deep preoccupations of the generations of that time. High exposure to violence, aggression, and injustice in the Middle East had established a hospitable environment for the super-powerful resistance figure and pro-justice hero." Go Nagai stated in an interview with Arab News that he believes the geopolitical climate in the Arab world played a big role in Grendizer becoming popular in Arab regions.

== See also ==
- Grendizer, Getter Robot G, Great Mazinger: Kessen! Daikaijuu
- UFO Robot Grendizer vs. Great Mazinger
