= Go Nagai =

Japanese manga artist (born 1945)

- 永井豪
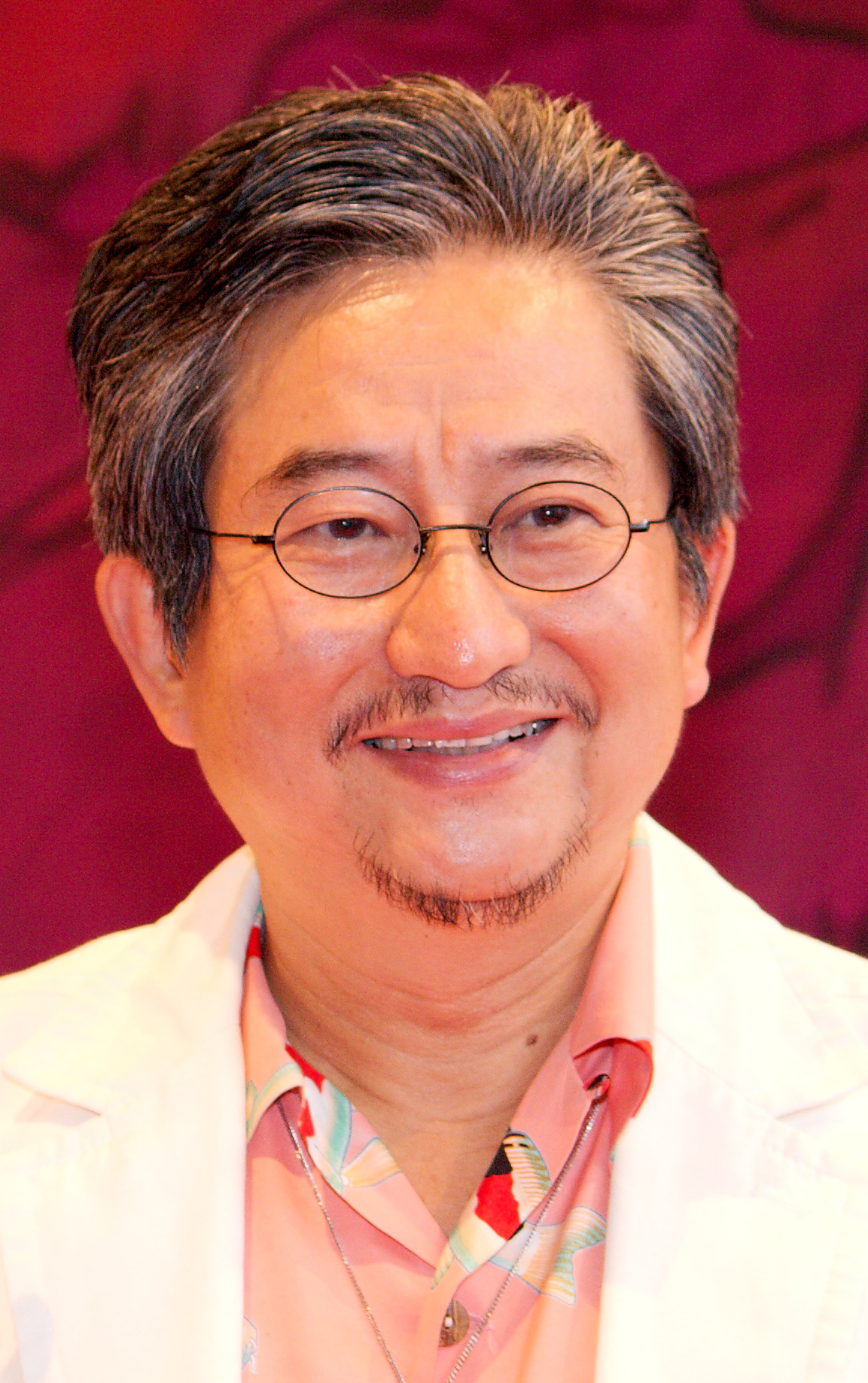
- Go Nagai at Japan Expo in 2008
- Born: Kiyoshi Nagai (永井潔, Nagai Kiyoshi); September 6, 1945 (age 81); Wajima, Ishikawa, Japan
- Occupation: Manga artist
- Known for: Cutie Honey; Devilman; Violence Jack; Harenchi Gakuen; Mazinger Z; Grendizer; Gaiking; Steel Jeeg; Getter Robo; Demon Lord Dante; Dororon Enma-kun
- Relatives: Yasutaka Nagai (brother)
- Awards: 4th Kodansha Manga Award; Shōnen: Susano Oh; 25th Japan Movie Critics Awards: Diamond Grand Prize; 47th Japan Cartoonists Association Award; Minister of Education, Culture, Sports, Science and Technology Award: All of his works

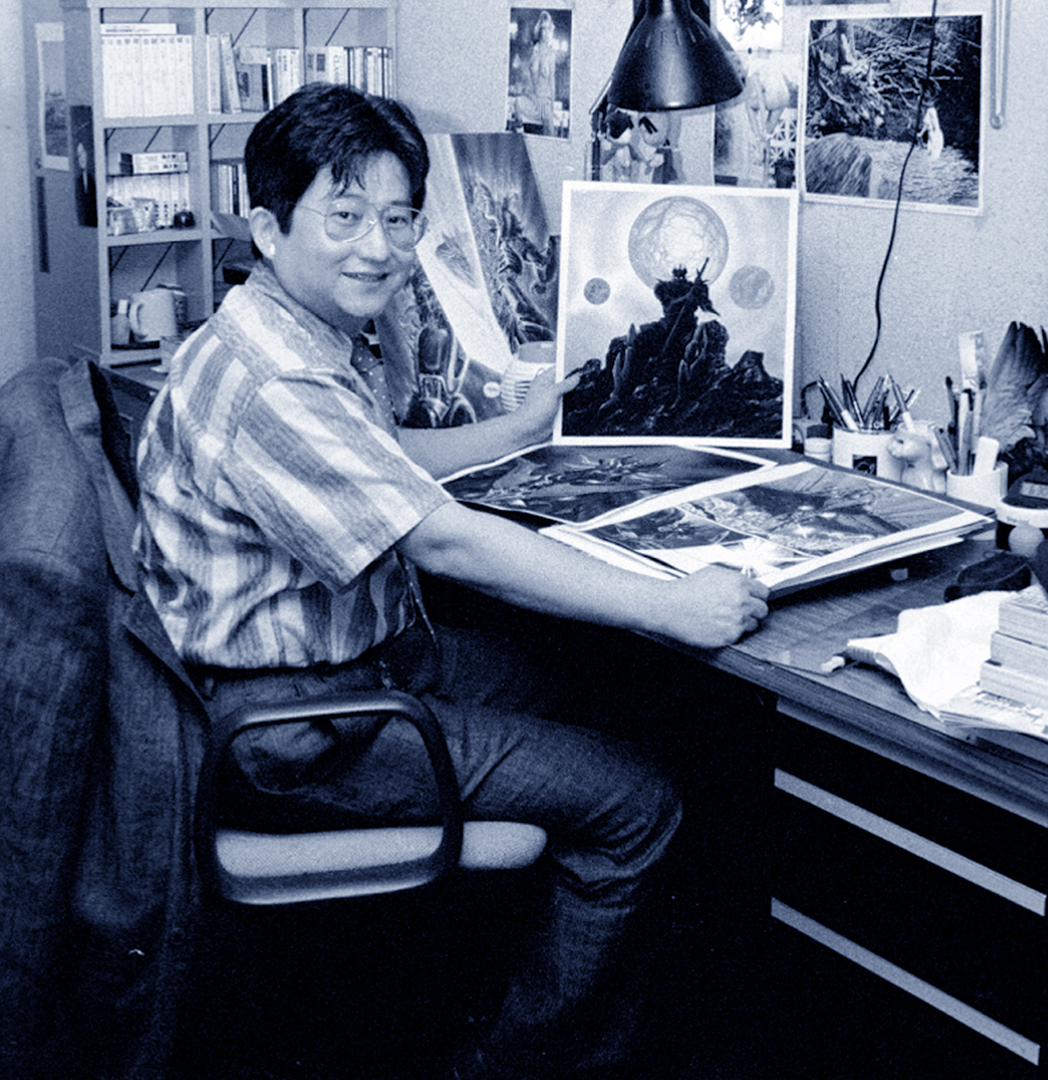
Go Nagai in his studio, Tokyo, 1987; photo by Sally Larsen

Kiyoshi Nagai (永井潔, Nagai Kiyoshi; born September 6, 1945), better known by the pen name Go Nagai (永井 豪, Nagai Gō), is a Japanese manga artist and a prolific author of science fiction, fantasy and horror. He made his professional debut in 1967 with Meakashi Polikichi, but is best known for creating popular 1970s manga and anime series such as Cutie Honey, Devilman, and Mazinger Z. He is credited with creating the super robot genre; designing the first mecha robots piloted by a user from within a cockpit with Mazinger Z; as well as helping pioneer the magical girl genre with Cutie Honey; the post-apocalyptic manga/anime genre with Violence Jack; and the ecchi genre with Harenchi Gakuen. In 2005, he became a Character Design professor at the Osaka University of Arts. He has been a member of the Tezuka Osamu Cultural Prize's nominating committee since 2009.

== Life ==
=== Early life ===
Go Nagai was born on September 6, 1945 in the Ishikawa Prefecture city of Wajima. He is the son of Yoshio and Fujiko Nagai (永井芳雄・冨士子), and the fourth of five brothers. His family had just returned from Shanghai. While he was still in his early childhood, he along with his mother and his four brothers moved to Tokyo after the death of his father. As a child, he was influenced by the work of Gustave Doré (specifically, a Japanese edition of the Divine Comedy), Shirato Sanpei and Osamu Tezuka (Nagai's brother Yasutaka gave him a copy of Lost World).

He graduated from the Metropolitan Itabashi High School of Tokyo. While passing his ronin year in a prep school in order to earn placement at Waseda University, he suffered a severe case of diarrhea for three weeks. Aware of his own mortality, he wanted to leave some evidence that he had lived, by doing something that he liked as a child: working on manga. He was determined to create one work of manga in what he thought were his last months. As Nagai prepared for the task, he went to the hospital, where he was diagnosed with catarrh of the colon, and soon healed. But this was the turning point in his life. Convinced that he would continue working on manga, he stopped attending school after three months and started living as a rōnin.

With the help of his brother Yasutaka, he created his first manga works. Despite the fact that his mother opposed his manga aspirations, he submitted his works for publication, accumulating many rejections. It is said that when the young Nagai submitted his tables to publishers, his mother secretly convinced publishers to reject them. However, his work was noticed by Weekly Shōnen Sunday, which contacted Shotaro Ishinomori. Thanks to some trial manga he created with the help of Yasutaka, Nagai was finally accepted into the studio of Ishinomori in 1965.

The trial manga was about a science fiction ninja, and was a prototype for a different story, Kuro no Shishi. Nagai was 19 years old when he made this work; it started at 15 or 16 pages and ended up being 88 pages long after a year, and was untitled at that time. Ishinomori saw this work and praised Nagai for it, but commented that the design was too chunky and he should improve it a little. Two or three days later, Nagai was invited to become an assistant to Ishinomori and this work was forgotten until 2007, when it was published in the magazine Comic Ran Twins Sengoku Busho Retsuden (コミック乱 TWINS 戦国武将列伝) by LEED under the name Satsujinsha (殺刃者 (さつじんしゃ)). His professional career began in 1967, despite the opposition of his mother.

=== First works ===
After working as assistant of Shotaro Ishinomori, his very first professional manga work was Meakashi Polikichi (目明しポリ吉 or 目明かしポリ吉), a very short gag comedy one-shot, published in November 1967 in the magazine Bokura by Kodansha. Almost at the same time, this was followed by the manga adaptation of Tomio Sagisu's TV anime Chibikko Kaiju Yadamon (ちびっこ怪獣ヤダモン, "Little Monster Yadamon"), also published in 1967 in the same magazine. A common misconception is that Kuro no Shishi ("Black Lion") was his first manga work; while not entirely false, what Nagai really made two years earlier than Meakashi Polikichi, was only a draft for what would later be Kuro no Shishi, which would not be actually published until 1978.

His first works consisted entirely of short gag comedy manga. This would change with Harenchi Gakuen.

=== First success and controversies ===
Less than a year after debuting, he experienced his first big success. After being an unknown manga artist, he was invited to televised debates and journalistic investigations.

In 1968, while Shueisha was getting prepared to launch its first manga publication, Shōnen Jump, in order to compete with other magazines from rival companies (like Shōnen Magazine from Kodansha and Shōnen Sunday from Shogakukan), Nagai was invited to be one of the first manga artists publishing in the new magazine. He contemplated this, since he had to design a long-running series instead of the auto-conclusive short stories that he had been developing until that point. He accepted and the series became a big success, being the first for Nagai and making Shōnen Jump sell more than one million copies. With Harenchi Gakuen, Nagai was the first to introduce eroticism in modern manga and became the creator of modern erotic manga, opened the door to a new era in manga and also became the symbol of an entire generation. This work has influenced Japanese society radically, completely changing the common perceptions of manga.

Until Harenchi Gakuen, Japanese manga had been relatively tame affairs, but things soon changed. The manga became so popular that several live-action films and TV series based on the manga were developed. Harenchi Gakuen is considered as probably the work that has had the most influence in the world of manga at the end of the 1960s, leading the newly born Shōnen Jump magazine to sell millions of copies per week.

A scandalous manga in its time, it is a very innocent series by today's standards. At the time of its original publication, however, it met with severe criticism by some parts of the Japanese society. Harenchi Gakuen was criticized as vulgar because it introduced overt eroticism to children. Male students and teachers were depicted as being preoccupied with catching glimpses of girls' panties or naked bodies. Many parents, women's associations, and PTAs protested.

In particular, the PTA protests over Harenchi Gakuen were notorious. Nagai was bombarded with interview requests from newspapers, magazines and TV. Whenever he flew outside of Tokyo, TV cameras were waiting for him. He was branded a "nuisance" and even an "enemy of society". He, however, had a clear sense of what things he could or could not do with the manga.

At first, Nagai did not think that the opposition was against him, since he was aware of the standards that applied with movies and similar things for an audience below 18 years old. At that time, he never drew sex scenes, avoided pictures of genitals and made nudes cute rather than sexy, though the manga regularly showed male genitals throughout its run, including a castration scene. His fans supported him throughout the PTA protests. They sent him letters where they expressed how they were aware that the adults cracking down on them were reading raunchier stuff than what Nagai was producing.

The protests were not only against the manga, but also against the TV series. The PTA managed to prevent the distribution of the magazine in some parts of Japan. As a result of the protests, when the series was about to be cancelled because of the PTA, Nagai changed the theme in Harenchi Gakuen into a more mature and serious matter, from nonsense gags with sexy touches, to a full-scale war where murder was depicted in the bloody way for which many know him. This led to the famous ending of Harenchi Gakuen, symbol of freedom and of rejection of the hypocrisy, where all students and teachers, while defending their freedom of expression, are killed by the PTA and other parental forces. This was the ironic answer that Nagai gave to the PTA. (In the end, this was not the actual ending of Harenchi Gakuen, as the title would subsequently return to publication for several years.)

It was also around that time that he created Gakuen Taikutsu Otoko (ガクエン退屈男), also known as Guerrilla High, another school-themed manga, but this time war between youths and adults was the main theme. Shortly before that, in 1969, Abashiri Ikka (あばしり一家) was created. Both titles are a direct result of the PTA protests, with both being a form of parody of what happened. Abashiri Ikka became a big success, and along with Harenchi Gakuen, the most popular series of Nagai's juvenile period.

=== Dynamic Productions ===
Thanks to the success of Harenchi Gakuen, Dynamic Productions (ダイナミックプロダクション, also known as Dynamic Production or Dynamic Pro, ダイナミックプロ), was founded by Go Nagai with his brothers in April 1969. Meant to be a group to help him with his works, as a consequence Harenchi Gakuen, where he derived almost no royalties from the TV series, films, or related merchandise, Dynamic Productions became a company established to manage Nagai's relations and contractual rights of his work. Dynamic became one of the first companies to require publishers sign contracts (even today many manga are created and published only on the basis of verbal agreements). It would start as a yūgen gaisha (limited company) and would change to a kabushiki gaisha (stock company) in 1970.

The same year of the foundation of Dynamic Pro, Ken Ishikawa joined the company. He would become Nagai's second assistant after Mitsuru Hiruta, who had been working with Nagai since the beginnings of Harenchi Gakuen. He would become one of Nagai's regular partners and his best friend. Ken Ishikawa participated as assistant in Harenchi Gakuen, Abashiri Ikka and Gakuen Taikutsu Otoko, particularly in the last one. In parallel with those activities as assistant, he co-produces with Go Nagai what would be in fact his professional debut in manga, Gakuen Bangaichi (1969-09-08 ~ 1970-09-22), and also his second manga, Sasurai Gakuto (1970-01 ~ 1970-05). He temporarily quit Dynamic Productions in 1970. This prompted Nagai to end Gakuen Taikutsu Otoko and the story of this series would be left inconclusive.

=== Change in genres ===
Even with the changes in Harenchi Gakuen and other series, Nagai remained writing mostly gag comedies, varying only in the thematic. With the success of Harenchi Gakuen and Abashiri Ikka, most editors expected this kind of story from Nagai. This would start to change in 1970, with the one-shot Oni -2889 Nen no Hanran-, which tells a science fiction story set in the year 2889 about a war between the race of oni (who in this story are treated as a lower class) and the human beings. After this, in 1971 came the horror one-shot Susumu-chan Dai Shock about a violent collapse of the parent-child relationships. A series of horror one-shots would follow, in the series called Gensou Kyofu e Hanashi (幻想恐怖絵噺), which comprehends Africa no Chi (an original story of Yasutaka Tsutsui), Schalken Gahaku (based in the famous story Strange Event in the Life of Schalken the Painter by Joseph Sheridan Le Fanu) and Kuzureru. A little before that, Nagai would be given the chance to write a full serial of an occult horror story called Demon Lord Dante, which would in turn mark the beginning of his most famous horror work, Devilman. Nagai stated in his autobiographical manga Gekiman! that his aspirations had always been to write more serious science fiction stories, and after the discontinuation of Demon Lord Dante saw Devilman as his chance to break out of the gag manga expectations publishers had of him.

=== Style and works ===
In his series Harenchi Gakuen (ハレンチ学園, Shameless School; 1968–1972, Weekly Shōnen Jump magazine) Nagai used eroticism and extreme, graphic violence in kid's manga for the first time in Japan, thus breaking taboos and becoming quite controversial. His use of violence and gross humour was widely loathed in many corners of Japan's society and became a concern for many PTAs at the time. The series temporary ended dramatically when all the characters died during a massacre. This type of content would be a trend in most of Nagai's later work and in those of other directors such as Yoshiyuki Tomino. A Harenchi Gakuen live-action TV series followed in the early 1970s, as well as several other live-action movies and an OVA version (Heisei Harenchi Gakuen, or "Modern-Day Shameless School") in the mid-1990s.

In 1970, Go Nagai started a company, Dynamic Productions, to fund his manga and anime ventures. Dynamic Productions' first titles were Getter Robo and Abashiri Ikka (あばしり一家, Abashiri Family).

After Harenchi Gakuen Nagai created the Mazinger Z (マジンガーZ) series, later expanded into Great Mazinger, Grendizer, and - many years later - Mazinkaiser, where he developed the concept of giant mecha. Mazinger was the first manga where a giant robot was piloted by the hero, thus creating one of the biggest staples of the industry. Mazinger is considered the first successful "Super Robot" anime show, and has spawned numerous imitations.

Simultaneously to Mazinger, he created one of his most popular manga, Devilman (デビルマン, Devilman), about a demonic hero fighting against hordes of demons. This manga was published simultaneously alongside an original TV anime under the same name, but due to the difference in age demographics became very different stories. The concepts were initially conceived for the TV series, which would be directed at elementary school age children, and were altered for the manga, which would be published in a shōnen magazine with teenage readers. This allowed Nagai to include violence, nudity, and darker themes closer to the content of Demon Lord Dante. Go Nagai considers the Devilman and Mazinger series to be his life's work due to their massive popularity all over the world. In 1972, Nagai managed the very difficult feat of both drawing and writing five weekly manga publications at the same time, an accomplishment only equalled by other manga artists Shinji Mizushima and George Akiyama.

A month later after finishing Devilman, Nagai would create a sequel to it called Violence Jack (ヴァイオレンス ジャック, Vaiorensu Jakku), another long-running series that spanned multiple volumes and dealt with a giant brute of a man fighting for justice in a post-apocalyptic setting where Japan has been devastated by a massive earthquake and isolated from the rest of the world.

Years later Nagai revamped Devilman featuring versions of the protagonists as young adult women and altering the storyline, which eventually became another sequel story to the original. This series is called Devilman Lady (デビルマンレディー; Devil Lady in the US). It was first released as a manga and later animated with some changes.

One of Nagai's most popular works outside of his fanbase has been Cutey Honey, considered to be a major influence on future magical girl (in particular Sailor Moon). Nagai had less success a few years later with Majokko Tickle, a more traditional magical-girl series for younger children, although the accompanying anime was popular on TV in some European countries.

In 1980, he received the 4th Kodansha Manga Award for shōnen for Susano OH.

Nagai has worked with Shotaro Ishinomori and Ken Ishikawa. He is currently being more prolific in manga production than ever. Much of Nagai's work has been adapted into anime and tokusatsu. Nagai has made cameo appearances in some live-action films, including The Toxic Avenger Part II, the Cutie Honey 2004 live action film, and in a special DVD-only episode of Cutie Honey: The Live as Dr. Koshiro Kisaragi.

== Assistants ==
- Ken Ishikawa (Kenichi Ishikawa, Rokuro Gen (Pen name for collaboration works))
- Gosaku Ota
- Shinobu Kaze
- Tatsuya Yasuda (Tatsuo Yasuda, Rokuro Gen)
- Seiji Tanaka
- Ryu Noguchi (Taiyo Noguchi)
- Shigeru Akimoto (Mitsushige Hayata, Rokuro Gen)... affiliated to Shiranuhi Pro (Division of Dynamic Pro)
- Shuichi Ishiwata (Panchos Ishiwata)
- Masaru Irago (Ryo Irago, Hitomi Fuko)
- Iwasawa Tomo-daka
- Yū Okazaki (Yoshihiro Okada)
- Makoto Ono (Makoto Ono, Makoto Muramatsuri, Makoto Muramatsuri, Entotsu Ono, Makoto Muramatsuri, Makoto Ono)
- Onodera Katsuhiko
- Oyamada Tsutomu
- Haku Rokurou
- Eiichi Satou (Eiichi Saito, Kon Oriharu)... affiliated to Shiranuhi Pro
- Sakamoto TakeshiHisashi
- Sasaki Kazushi
- Shintaku Yoshimitsu
- Takayuki Sugiyama (Kitaro)
- Takashima Shigeru
- Junichi Takanashi
- Takanashi Teppei
- Kenichi Takigawa (Orichalcum)
- Masahito Tanaka
- Koichi Tamura
- Doronpa (Tadashi Makimura, Rokuro Gen)
- Ninomiya Hirohiko
- Nonaka Minoru
- Hamada Yoshimi (Rokuro Gen)
- Mitsuru Hiruta (Mitsuru Hiruta, Yukio Asai, Yukio Asai, Mitsuru Asahi)
- Star Kazuya
- Koichi Maruyama (Koichi Hagane)
- Mutsu Toshiyuki
- Yamato Kouichi
- Susumu Yoshikawa (Susumu Yoshikawa, Rokuro Gen)

== Success abroad ==
In Italy, France, and the Middle East, Grendizer was very popular when it aired. In Spain, a Mazinger Z statue has been erected in Tarragona.

In 2026, Nagai attended the Italian festival Lucca Comics & Games, where he was named Maestro del Fumetto (Master of Comics). As is customary for recipients of the honor, he donated his self-portrait to the Uffizi Galleries.

== Legacy ==
Nagai is credited with pioneering the super robot genre with Mazinger Z and the magical girl genre with Cutie Honey. Violence Jack also created the post-apocalyptic manga and anime genre. Its desert wasteland setting had biker gangs, anarchic violence, ruined buildings, innocent civilians, tribal chiefs, and small abandoned villages. This was similar to, and may have influenced, the desert wasteland settings of later post-apocalyptic franchises such as the Australian film series Mad Max (1979 debut) and the Japanese manga and anime series Fist of the North Star (Hokuto no Ken, 1983 debut).

Director and animator Hideaki Anno cited both Devilman and Mazinger as sources of inspiration for his Neon Genesis Evangelion series during a conversation between him and Nagai published in Devilman Tabulae Anatomicae in 1999. Anno would later direct a theatrical tokusatsu feature-length film adaptation of Cutie Honey (on which Nagai makes a cameo appearance), as well as a three-part OVA series with the same plot as the movie titled Re: Cutie Honey, both released in 2004.

In an interview in the booklet that comes in the premium Blu-ray edition of Dororon Enma-kun Meeramera, the animation director Takahiro Kimura claims to be a Go Nagai fan since he was a child and that Dororon Enma-kun was his favourite.

Manga artist Kentaro Miura (Berserk) claims that he likes Go Nagai's dynamic style and that Nagai had a big influence on him, in an interview which was included as an extra in the fourth volume of the North American DVD release by Media Blasters in 2002.

Movie director Yoshihiro Nishimura (Tokyo Gore Police) claimed that he's a fan of Go Nagai's works in an interview with Sancho Asia and said that he wants to re-adapt Devilman into a live action movie since he did not like the 2004 live action Devilman adaptation by Hiroyuki Nasu. In another interview by Screen Anarchy, he also said that he wanted to adapt Violence Jack into live action.

Scriptwriter Kazuki Nakashima is also familiar with his works. "In particular, I read everything by Go Nagai, from his debut works and then when I was in middle school his work Devilman really struck me. I felt like I was maturing along with the development of the writer himself."

Japanese novelist, visual novel writer, and anime screenwriter Gen Urobuchi explained that Devilman made him realize that bittersweet endings are the best ones.

According to an interview between an Italian gaming website, geekgamer.it and Shadow Hearts video game series creator Matsuzo Machida, the latter was inspired by the works of Go Nagai and Keisuke Fujikawa (Mazinger Z screenplay).

Videogame designer, writer, and director Goichi Suda cites two works of Go Nagai, Violence Jack and Susano Oh as his favorite manga.

Approximately seventy-five other series inspired by Devilman were also featured on a poster and website as part of the advertising for Devilman Crybaby. This list includes titles such as Parasyte, Tokyo Ghoul, and Attack on Titan alongside the afformentioned Neon Genesis Evangelion and Berserk. This list does not include a number of other series whose creators have attributed the series as an inspiration or featured clear visual homages. (For example, Yu-Gi-Oh!'s creator Kazuki Takahashi has stated that Devilman was one of the characters he drew most as a child.) The story has also inspired stories published after this site was created, such as Tatsuki Fujimoto's Chainsaw Man.

Plans for a museum for Go Nagai were announced in 2005. Go Nagai Wonderland Museum opened in 2009 in Wajima, Ishikawa. The museum burned down after the 2024 Sea of Japan earthquake.

== Honours ==
- Order of the Rising Sun, 4th Class, Gold Rays with Rosette (2025)
