= Go Nagai bibliography =

Go Nagai (born September 6, 1945) is a prolific Japanese manga artist who has written, illustrated, or otherwise contributed to over 360 manga titles since his professional debut in 1967 with Meakashi Polikichi. Specializing in science fiction, fantasy, horror, and erotica, he is best known for creating the seminal works Cutie Honey, Devilman, and Mazinger Z in the 1970s.

== 1960s ==
- Meakashi Polikichi (目明しポリ吉, 目明かしとなほからはらはあたちなはひのななさひさはさポリ吉, Detective Polikichi) (November 1967, Monthly Bokura)
- Chibikko Kaiju Yadamon (ヤダモン, ちびっこ怪獣ヤダモン, Yadamon) (December 1967-July 1968, Monthly Bokura) Original work by Tomio Sagisu
- Yuhi no Kenman (夕日の剣マン) (January 1968, Monthly Shonen Magazine)
- Chibikko Keiji-chan (ちびっこ刑事ちゃん) (January 15, 1968, Manga Ou Special Issue)
- Jintaro Sandogasa (じん太郎三度笠) (February 4 – March 3, 1968, Weekly Shonen Magazine)
- Hana no Sanshiro (ハナの三四郎) (February 4, 1968, Shonen Magazine Special Issue)
- Sanbiki no Kenman (三匹の剣マン) (Spring, Summer 1968, Shonen Magazine Comics)
- Go-chan no Fantaji Waraudo Ban (豪ちゃんのふぁんたじい·わらうどバン) (April 1968, COM)
- Jigoku no Kenman (地獄の剣マン) (April, August, September 1968, Monthly Shonen Magazine)
- Izari Shi Monogatari (いざり市物語) (May 1968, COM)
- Magokko Kinta (馬子っこきん太) (May 1968-December 1969, Manga Ou/September, November 1968, January, August, September 1969, Bessatsu Manga Ou)
- Koya no Kenman (荒野の剣マン) (June 23 – July 14, 1968, Weekly Shonen Magazine)
- Tenrankai no E (展覧会の絵) (July 1968, COM)
- Harenchi Gakuen (ハレンチ学園, Shameless School) (August 1, October 24, November 7, December 26, 1968-October 13, November 3, 1969-May 25, June 15 – July 20, August 24, 1970 – February 8, 1971, January 1 – June 5, June 19 – September 25, 1972, Weekly Shonen Jump/April 1969, Shonen Book/June 3, August 31, 1969, Shonen Jump Special Issue)
- Allah-kun (アラーくん) (August 1968-October 1969, Monthly Bokura)
- Mini Mini Manga Dai-Koshin (ミニミニまんが大行進, ミニミニまんが爆笑大行進) (August 4, 1968, Weekly Shonen Magazine)
- Dengeki Shiro Inazuma Sakusen (電撃四郎イナズマ作戦) (August 1968, Bessatsu Manga Ou)
- Huuten Ninpo Cho (風天忍法帳) (August 29, 1968, Weekly Shonen Jump)
- Bravo! Sensei (ブラボー!先生) (September 17 – October 1, 1968, Shojo Friend)
- Ra Samurai (ラ·サムライ) (September 1968, COM)
- Usurasebun (ウスラセブン) (October 3, 1968, Weekly Shonen Jump)
- Kaishin Saku (会心作) (October 1968, COM)
- Shin Sen Gumi Somatsu Ki (新選組そまつ記) (October 1968, Shonen Book)
- Pansy-chan (パンジーちゃん) (November 1968, Nakayoshi)
- Kuishin Boku-chan (くいしんボクちゃん) (December 1968, Shogaku Ichinensei)
- Receive-chan (レシーブちゃん) (December 1968, Nakayoshi)
- Wanpaku Yaro no Mechanic Daisenso (わんぱく野郎のメカニック大戦争) (January 1, 1969, Weekly Shonen Magazine)
- Nazonazoboya X-kun (なぞなぞぼうやXくん) (January–March, 1969, Shogaku Ichinensei)
- Ultra Spy Hige Godzilla (ウルトラスパイ ヒゲゴジラ) (January 1969, Shonen Book)
- Yume no Sekai no Mari-chan (ゆめの世界のマリちゃん) (January 1969, Nakayoshi)
- Goketsu Mika-chan (ごうけつミカちゃん) (January 1969, Nakayoshi Special Issue)
- Meakashi Polikichi -Yokoku Goto no Kan- (目明しポリ吉-予告強盗の巻-) (January 1969, COM)
- Fighting Pants-kun (ファイティングパンツくん) (February 1969, Shonen Book)
- Daimachi Sensei (ダイマチ先生) (February 1969, Nakayoshi)
- Kimagure Kyoshitsu (きまぐれ教室) (February 1969, Ribon Comics) Also known as Kimagure Sensei (きまぐれ先生)
- Neko no Ko Love-chan (ねこの子ラブちゃん) (February–March, 1969, Bessatsu Shojo Friend)
- Kikkai-kun (キッカイくん) (February 2 – May 10, May 31 – December 21, 1969, January 4 – November 8, 1970, Weekly Shonen Magazine/August 1969-April 1970, Monthly Shonen Magazine)
- Handsome-kun (ハンサムくん) (March 1969, Nakayoshi)
- Hunter-kun (ハンターくん) (March 1969, Shonen Book)
- Onna Bancho Houin Daiko (女番長ほういん大子) (March 1969, Shonen Gaho)
- Migawari Pansy-chan (みがわりパンジーちゃん) (April 1969, Nakayoshi)
- Koibito-kun (コイビトくん) (April 1969, Shonen Book) Reissued as "Kick-chan"
- Sweet-chan (スイートちゃん) (April 22 – May 27, July 8 – December 23, 1969, Shojo Friend) Co-production with Taiyo Noguchi.
- Funny Boy (ファニーボーイ) (May 1969, Monthly Funny) Co-production with Yukio Asai.
- Godzilla ga Yuku (ゴジラがゆく) (May 9, 1969, Joker)
- Oni Keiji ga Yuku (鬼刑事がゆく) (May 23, 1969, Joker)
- Janken Ken-chan (ジャンケン·ケンちゃん) (June–September 1969, Nakayoshi) Co-production with Taiyo Noguchi.
- Pinky no Koi no Kizetsu (ピンキーの恋のキゼツ) (June 1969, Ribon) A combination of comic with photographies.
- Onna Tobaku Shi ga Yuku (女賭博師がゆく) (June 13, 1969, Joker)
- Chikan ga Yuku (痴漢がゆく) (June 27, 1969, Joker)
- Sweet-chan (スイートちゃん) (July 8 – December 26, 1969, Shojo Friend) Co-production with Tsutomu Oyamada.
- Zohyo ga Yuku (雑兵がゆく) (July 11, 1969, Joker)
- Oishasan ga Yuku (お医者さんがゆく) (July 25, 1969, Joker)
- Shinobi ga Yuku (忍がゆく) (August 8, 1969, Joker)
- Abashiri ikka (あばしり一家, The Abashiri Family) (August 10, 1969 – April 9, 1973, Weekly Shonen Champion)
- Gakuen Bangaichi (学園番外地) (September 8, 1969 – February 9, 1971, Shonen Gaho) Co-production with Ken Ishikawa, Ishikawa's debut. Last stories with art by Tetsuji Aikawa.
- Seibu no Yojinbo Macaroni-chan (西部の用心棒マカロニちゃん) (September 1969, Bessatsu Manga Ou)
- Daitozoku (大盗賊) (Autumn 1969, Bessatsu Manga Ou)
- Chan-kun (チャンクン, Chang Kung) (November 18 – December 26, 1969, Weekly Bokura Magazine)

== 1970s ==
- Sasurai Gakuto (さすらい学徒) (January–May 1970, Manga Ou) Co-production with Ken Ishikawa, Ishikawa's second professional manga.
- Oni -2889 Nen no Hanran- (鬼-2889年の反乱-) (January 1, 1970, Weekly Shonen Magazine)
- Komatsu Charm (こまっチャーム) (January 6 – May 19, June 9 – July 7, 1970, Shojo Friend) Co-production with Tsutomu Oyamada.
- Hidoi Kyoto (ひどい巨塔) (January 10, 1970, Big Comic)
- Sukisuki Skiing-chan (すきすきスキーちゃん, Suki Suki Skiing-chan) (January 20·27, 1970, Shojo Friend)
- Kaiketsu Ultra Super Deluxe-man (快傑ウルトラスーパーデラックスマン) (January 27 – February 10, 1970, Weekly Bokura Magazine)
- Go! Go! Go-chan Warai (GO!GO!豪ちゃん笑) (February–July 1970, Monthly Shonen Magazine)
- Gakuen Taikutsu Otoko (ガクエン退屈男, Guerrilla High) (February 17 – September 22, 1970, Weekly Bokura Magazine)
- GO! Go! Nonsense (GO!豪!ナンセンス) (March 22 – July 5, 1970, Weekly Shonen Sunday)
- Kyuketsuki Kari (吸血鬼狩り) (April 1970, Monthly Shonen Magazine)
- Jinrui no Shinpo to Fuchowa (人類の進歩と不調和) (May 9, 1970, Sunday Mainichi Special Issue - Gekiga & Manga)
- Shosetsu Tengoku to Jigoku (小説·天国と地獄) (June 27, 1970, Play Comic)
- Go-chan no Fushigina Sekai (豪ちゃんのふしぎな世界) (July 12, 1970, Weekly Shonen Sunday)
- Maro (まろ) (July 19–26, September 20–27, 1970, January 10 – June 27, 1971, Weekly Shonen Sunday)
- Boy Hunter (ボーイハンター) (August 1970, Jogakusei no Tomo)
- Tengoku to Jigoku (天国と地獄) (August 11, 1970, Weekly Bokura Magazine)
- Shain wa V (社員はV) (September 11, 1970, Weekly Yomiuri)
- Kaijuu-Hakase Pokopen-chan (かいじゅうはかせポコペンちゃん) (September 1970-January 1971, Shogaku Ichinensei)
- Sanshiro (三四郎) (September 12, 1970, Manga Sunday)
- Captain Past (キャプテンパースト) (November 1970, SF Magazine)
- Mao Dante (魔王ダンテ) (January 1 – June 1, 1971, Weekly Bokura Magazine)
- Golgo 17·18·19 (ゴルゴ17·18·19) (January 10, 1971, Big Comic)
- Yagyu no Sasurau Kuni Nite (野牛のさすらう国にて) (January 24·31, 1971, Weekly Shonen Magazine)
- Chakapoko (チャカぽこ) (February–September 1971, Shogakukan no Gakushu Zasshi series)
- Susumu-chan Dai Shock (ススムちゃん大ショック) (March 7, 1971, Weekly Shonen Magazine)
- Africa no Chi (アフリカの血, Blood of Africa) (April 11, 1971, Weekly Shonen Magazine) Original work by Yasutaka Tsutsui.
- Schalken Gahaku (シャルケン画伯, Schalken the Painter) (April 18, 1971, Weekly Shonen Magazine) Original work by Joseph Sheridan Le Fanu.
- Sanchome Ga Senso Desu (三丁目が戦争です) (April 20, 1971) Written by Yasutaka Tsutsui, published by Dōwa Ehon.
- Kuzureru (くずれる) (April 25, 1971, Weekly Shonen Magazine)
- Resura-Man (れすらマン, れずらマン, Wrestler-Man) (June 28, 1971, Weekly Shonen Jump)
- Yokufuka Zukin (よくふか頭巾) (July 7, 1971, Weekly Shonen Jump)
- Yatai Oh (屋台王) (July 12, 1971, Weekly Shonen Jump)
- Dai-Kamen (大仮面) (July 19, 1971, Weekly Shonen Jump)
- Yakkora Sho (やっこらショ) (July 1971, COM)
- Go Gag Tama-kun Tama-chan (豪ギャグ タマくんタマちゃん) (July 1971, Kibo no Tomo) Co-production with Tomotaka Iwasawa.
- Zuba-Ban (ズバ蛮, Zuba The Barbarian) (July 4 – December 26, 1971, Weekly Shonen Sunday)
- Nekketsu Dan (ネッけつ団) (August 2–16, 1971, Weekly Shonen Jump)
- Enoshima Dodzilla (江の島ドジラ, alternatively Enoshima Dojira) (September 5, 1971, Weekly Shonen Magazine)
- Shiroi Sekai no Kaibutsu (白い世界の怪物) (December 19, 1971, Weekly Shonen Magazine)
- Omorai-kun (オモライくん) (January 1 – June 4, August 6, 1972, Weekly Shonen Magazine)
- Animal Kedaman (あにまるケダマン) (January 16 – October 22, 1973, Weekly Shonen Sunday)
- Ganbare Supokon-kun (がんばれスポコンくん, Supokon-kun, スポコンくん) (January 16 – February 13, 1972, Weekly Shonen King)
- Raijin Thunder (雷人サンダー) (May–July 1972, Tanoshii Yōchien)
- Devilman (デビルマン) (June 11, 1972 – June 24, 1973, Weekly Shonen Magazine)
- Mazinger Z (マジンガーZ) (October 1972 - August 1973, Weekly Shōnen Jump)
- Dollyman (ドリーマン) (February 18, 1973, Weekly Shonen Sunday)
- Haijin Nijumencho (廃人二十面チョ, 廃人20面チョ) (March 12, 1973, Weekly Shonen Jump)
- Gariben (ガリベン, Moretsu Gariben, もーれつガリベン, Moretsu Gariben-kun, もーれつガリベンくん) (April 22, 1973, Weekly Shonen Sunday)
- Kiri no Tobira (霧の扉) (May 13, 1973, Weekly Shonen Magazine)
- Chottodakeyo! (ちょっとだけよ!) (June 3, 1973, Gekiga Gendai)
- Shirayukihime (白雪姫) (June 4, 1973, Weekly Shonen Champion)
- Renkonman (レンコンマン) (June 24, 1973, Weekly Shonen Sunday)
- Violence Jack (バイオレンスジャック) (July 22 – December 23, 1973, January 13 – September 30, 1974, Weekly Shonen Magazine/January–October, December 1977-April, August–December 1978, Monthly Shonen Magazine/August 5, 1983 – March 12, 1990, Weekly Manga Goraku/November 1993, Tankōbon Kakioroshi/December 2001, Bessatsu Young Jump)
- Dororon Enma-kun (ドロロンえん魔くん) (September 30, 1973 – March 31, 1974, Weekly Shonen Sunday) Aside from Nagai's version, there are at least six other variations published in several publications from Shogakukan no Gakushu Zasshi (小学館の学習雑誌) series. These are illustrated by Tadashi Makimura, Tsutomu Oyamada, Ken Ishikawa and Yoshimi Hamada.
- Cutie Honey (キューティーハニー, Cutie Honey) (October 1, 1973 – April 1, 1974, Weekly Shonen Champion) Aside from Nagai's version, there are at least three other versions, illustrated by Ken Ishikawa, Yuu Okazaki and Masatoshi Nakajima. While the versions of Nagai and Ishikawa are considered Shōnen, the versions of Okazaki and Nakajima are Shōjo.
- Mazinger Z (マジンガーZ) (October 1973-September 1974, TV Magazine) TV Magazine serialization
- Akai Show Geki (赤いショーゲキ) (April 1974, Eiga Fan)
- Getter Robo (ゲッターロボ) (April 7, 1974 - August 24, 1975, Weekly Shōnen Sunday) Created with Ken Ishikawa, other series in the franchise where written & illustrated by Ken Ishikawa
- Mayonaka no Sensui (真夜中の戦士, Midnight Soldier) (April 22, 1974, Weekly Shonen Jump/September 11, 1981 – October 29, 1982, Shonen Magazine Special Issue)
- Joshi Daisei (女子大生) (April 26, 1974, Weekly Sankei)
- Donketsu Oh (ドンケツ王) (May 19, 1974, Weekly Shonen Sunday)
- Kaiketsu Hirashain (快ケツ平社員) (June 21, 1974, Weekly Post)
- Bakuratsu Kyoushitsu (バクラツ教室) (July 22 – August 5, 1974, Weekly Shonen Champion)
- Ishashashan (イシャシャしゃん, イシャシャシャン, Ishasha Shan---, イシャシャン———) (August 1974, Mondai Shōsetsu)
- Oira Sukeban (おいら女蛮, Delinquent in Drag, Sukeban Boy) (August 4, 1974-March 9, March 30 – June 17, June 31 – October 19, November 9, 1975-January 18·25, 1976, Weekly Shonen Sunday)
- Kekko Kamen (けっこう仮面) (September 1974, February, May, August, October, December 1975, February, April 1976-February 1978, Monthly Shonen Jump)
- Great Mazinger (グレートマジンガー) (October 1974-October 1975, TV Magazine)
- Iyahaya Nantomo (イヤハヤ南友) (November 3, 1974-March 9, March 30 – October 19, November 9, 1975 – May 23, 1976, Weekly Shonen Magazine)
- Daigaku Musekinin (ダイガク無籍人) (November 12, 1974 – September 2, 1975, Weekly Playboy)
- Sheryakko Holmes (シャーヤッコホームズ, シャーヤッコ·ホームズ) (January 1975, February 1977, February–September 1979, Monthly Shonen Magazine/November 1975, For Life)
- Shutendoji (手天童子, Jashin Senki, 邪神戦記, Princess Han Shutendoji, プリンセス版手天童子 ) (February 1975, Princess)
- Koko Mikaku Nin (コウコウ未確人) (April–June 1975, First Grade Course)
- Hagehatsuki Keke Ippatsu (ハゲ髪鬼毛毛一発) (April 21, 1975, Weekly Shonen Jump)
- Doki Doki Doshin! (ドキドキどしん!) (June 1, 1975, Margaret)
- Ryoko Shonendan (リョコー少年団) (May 25, 1975 – September 25, 1977, Shonen King Original)
- Janjaja~n Boss Borot Dai (ジャンジャジャ～ン ボスボロットだい) (July 1975-July 1976, TV Magazine) Credited as original work. Art by Tadashi Makimura.
- Kotetsu Jeeg (鋼鉄ジーグ) (August 1975-June 1976, TV Magazine) Art by Tatsuya Yasuda.
- Shinrei Tantei Occult Dan (心霊探偵オカルト団) (August 18, 1975 – May 24, 1976, Weekly Shonen King) Co-production with Hiroshi Koenji and Ken Ishikawa.
- Uchu Enban Dai-Senso (宇宙円盤大戦争) (Summer 1975, Boken Ou Special Issue) Art by Yoshimitsu Shintaku.
- Go-chan no Natsuyasumi (豪ちゃんの夏休み) (September 8, 1975, Weekly Shonen Action)
- UFO Robot Grendizer (UFOロボグレンダイザー) (October 1975-March 1977, TV Magazine)
- Jozoku Furo Tokage (女賊ふろとかげ) (March 29, 1976, Weekly Shonen Jump)
- Viva! Joshi Puroresu (ビバ！女子プロレス, Viva! Women's Wrestling) (April 17, 1976, Weekly Playboy)
- Konran Retto (混乱列島) (April 26 – September 13, 1976, Weekly Shōsetsu) Script by Yasutaka Tsutsui.
- Change! Sabu (チェンジ!さぶ) (May 17 – July 12, 1976, Weekly Shonen Action)
- Henchin Pokoider (へんちんポコイダー) (June, October 1976-January 1977, TV Magazine)
- King Bomber (キングボンバ) (June 1976-July 1977, Terebi-kun)
- Groizer X (グロイザーX) (June - September 1976, Manga Shōnen) Art by Panchosu Ishiwata
- Hamaguri Dosse~!! (ハマグリどっせ〜!!) (June 13, 1976 – June 4, 1978, Weekly Myōjō)
- Sheryakko Holmes (シャーヤッコ·ホームズ) (Autumn 1976, For Life)
- Aztecaser (アステカイザー) (July 1976-March 1977, Shōgaku San-nensei/August 1976-March 1977, Terebi-kun) Art by Ken Ishikawa.
- Garla (ガルラ) (July 1976-February 1977, TV Magazine)
- Dongara Sanjushi (どんがら三銃士) (July 1976-March 1977, Shōgaku San-nensei)
- Onari- Borottono Dai (おなり～っ ボロッ殿だい) (August 1976-September 1977, TV Magazine) Credited as original work. Art by Tadashi Makimura.
- Groizer X (グロイザーX) (September 1976- (?), Shōgaku San-nensei/August 1976-(?), Terebi-kun)
- Shutendoji (手天童子) (September 5, 1976 – April 30, 1978, Weekly Shonen Magazine)
- Viva! Onna Tarzan (ビバ!女ターザン) (October 12, 1976, Weekly Playboy)
- Ichimotsu-kun (いちもつ君, いちもつクン) (October 20, 1976 – March 3, 1977, Weekly Josei Jishin)
- Kaiketsu Chikanmen! (快傑痴仮ン面!) (October 28, November 25, 1976, Play Comic)
- Battle Hawk (バトルホーク) (November 1976-June 1977, Boken Ou) Art by Ken Ishikawa.
- Burai The Kid (無頼·ザ·キッド) (January 10, 1977 – April 25, 1978, Manga-kun)
- Hyoheki no Haha (氷壁の母) (January 1977, Shonen Jump Special Issue)
- Denso-jin Baruber (電送人バルバー) (April–October 1977, TV Magazine)
- Abashiri Ikka - Goemon Seijin (あばしり一家 ゴエモン星人) (April 14, 1977, Play Comic)
- Osakan Kazoku (おさかん家族) (April 21, 1977 – April 13, 1978, Play Comic)
- Harenchi Gakuen (ハレンチ学園) (May 1977, Monthly Shonen Jump)
- Fantaji (ファンタじい) (May 2, 1977, Weekly Shonen Jump)
- Go-chan no ara? Eh! Sassa~ (豪ちゃんのあら?えっ!さっさ〜) (July 1977-January 1978, Saint-Jacques)
- Ihin (遺品) (August 25, 1977, Josei 7)
- Oni no Kubi Fuunroku (鬼の首風雲録) (July 1977-January 1978, Omoshiro Hanbun) Writing by Go Nagai, illustration by Entotsu Ono, parody of Uma no Kubi Fuunroku (馬の首風雲録) by Yasutaka Tsutsui.
- Violence Car Hono no Taka (バイオレンスカー炎の鷹, aka Fire Falcon, Fire Hawk or simply Hono no Taka, 炎の鷹) (October 3, 1977-January 23rd･30th, 1978, Weekly Shonen King)
- Choningen Arawaru (超人間現る, 超人間現わる, also Hyper Choningen Arawaru, ヒューパー 超人間現る) (December 1977, Manga Shōnen)
- Kikkai tai Omorai Kasu Togi Sekaiichi Ketteisen (キッカイ対オモライ カス闘技世界一決定戦) (January 1, 1978, Weekly Shonen Magazine)
- Viva! Star Wars (ビバ!スターウォーズ) (January 3, 1978, Weekly Playboy)
- Garikyura Robocha Do Kin (ガリキュラろぼちゃード·キーン) (January 30・February 6, 1978, Weekly Shonen Jump)
- Wakabaka-sama (若バカさま) (February 20 – July 13, 1978, Weekly Shonen King)
- Kagami no Naka no Uchu (鏡の中の宇宙) (March 30, 1978, Go Nagai no Sekai)
- Dai Sanji Chuka Taisen (第三時中華大戦) (March 1978, Monthly Shonen Jump)
- Choman (超マン) (April 1978-March 1979, Monthly Shonen Jump)
- Majokko Tickle (魔女っ子チックル) (April 1978-February 1979, Monthly Hitomi)Credited as original work. Art by Yuki Narumi. Two other versions exist, one drawn by Peko Natsumi and the other by Miko Arasu, both published by Shogakukan in the magazines Shogaku Ichinensei and Yochien respectively.
- Ochikobore-kun (おちこぼれクン) (April 24, 1978, Weekly Shonen Jump)
- Yoru ni Kita Oni (夜に来た鬼) (May 1978, Monthly Shonen Magazine)
- Kuro no Shishi (黒の獅士, 黒の獅子, Black Lion) (May 28, 1978 – June 10, 1979, Weekly Shonen Magazine)
- Space Kishi (スペース騎士) (June 1978, Monthly Shonen Magazine)
- Uchu Kaibutsuen (宇宙怪物園) (July 1978, Monthly Shonen Magazine)
- Henki~n Tamaider (へんき〜んタマイダー) (August 10, 1978 – March 25, 1979, Manga-kun)
- Supeope Chu Gaku (スペオペ宙学, Space Opera Chu Gaku) (August 10, September 10, 1978 – May 20, 1979, Weekly Shonen Sunday)
- Majin Sensha Baldos (魔神戦車バルドス, 魔人戦車バルドス) (September 25, 1978, Weekly Shonen King)
- Enma Jigoku (炎魔地獄, aka Enma Jigoku no Kan, 炎魔地獄の巻) (September 1978, Manga Shōnen)
- Toshi M1 (都市M1) (January 25, 1979, Weekly Shonen Magazine)
- Shin Devilman (新デビルマン, aka Neo Devilman, Devilman - Time Travellers, Devilman 2) (February 1979, Variety/May 25, 1979, Weekly Shonen Magazine) With a collaboration of Masaki Tsuji and two scenarios by Hiroshi Koenji. Published in the US simply as Devilman by Verotik in 1995.
- Goemon Sensei (ゴエモン先生) (April 1979-July 1980, Monthly Shonen Jump)
- Hanappe Bazooka (花平バズーカ) (June 7, 1979-January 7th･14th, 1982, Young Jump) Scenario by Kazuo Koike.
- 00 Gakuen Spy Daisakusen (00学園スパイ大作戦) (March, June 1979-July 1981, Monthly Shonen Challenge)
- Susano OH (凄ノ王) (July 22, 1979 – April 8, 1981, Weekly Shonen Magazine)
- Dokuro no Yakata (髑髏の館) (July 27 – September 26, 1979, Josei 7)
- UFO Kara Kita Shōnen Mu (UFOから来た少年ムー) (August 1979-Spring 1980, Mu) Co-production with Ken Ishikawa.
- Iya~n Hanny (いや〜んハニー, いや〜んHANNY) (October 1979-May 1980, Monthly Playboy)
- MachineSaur (マシンザウラー, マシンサウル, Machine Sauer, Mashinzaura) (December 1979-March 1986 Published by Tomy Company, Ltd.)
- Schumann-fujin to Brahms Ai no Concerto (シューマン夫人とブラームス·愛のコンチェルト) (December 1979, Sound Recorder Pal) Work collaboration with Naoki Kamohara, data by Kouzou Asari.
- Omoide no K-kun (思い出のK君, 思いでのK君) (December 1979, Shonen World)

== 1980s ==
- Golumbo Tantei Sha (ゴロンボ探偵社) (January 24, 1980, Play Comic)
- Devilman (デビルマン(新デビルマン)) (January 25, September 15, 1980, Shonen Magazine Special Issue) A oneshot of Devilman with no title, considered part of Shin Devilman.
- Goodbye Boy (グッバイ·ボーイ) (April 10, 1980, Shonen Magazine - Young Bessatsu)
- Mushi (蟲) (April 15, 1980, Shonen Magazine Special Issue)
- Haru Ichiban (青春(はる)一番, Seishun Ichiban, 青春一番) (June 1980, Shonen Magazine - Young Bessatsu/July 1980-May 1981, Young Magazine) Scenario by Hiroshi Koenji.
- X Bomber (Xボンバー) (June–August 1980, Monthly Shonen Jump) Art by Naoki Kamohara.
- Murder (マーダー) (September 1, 1980, Ryu) Theorically another previous version of Kuro no Shishi.
- Aruhi Shōjo wa... (ある日少女は...) (November 1980, Monthly Manga Goraku) Scenario by Hiroshi Koenji.
- Maboroshi Panty (まぼろしパンティ, Illusion Panty, The Legendary Panty Mask) (November 1980-May 1982, Monthly Shonen Jump) Scenario by Hiroshi Koenji.
- Devilman (デビルマン(新デビルマン)) (March 16, May 8, 1981, Shonen Magazine Special Issue)
- Maho Ningyo Pendora (魔法にんぎょうペンドラ, 魔法人形ペンドラ) (April–August 1981, Yoiko)
- Mild 7 (まいるど7) (May 1 – October 30, 1981, Weekly Shonen Champion)
- Don! (July 10, 1981, Shonen Magazine Special Issue)
- 00 Spy Shuntaro (00スパイ春太郎) (July 10, 1981 – January 22, 1982, Weekly Shonen Challenge) Co-production with Tatsuya Yasuda.
- Bosogari (｢族」狩り) (August 7, 1981, Weekly Manga Goraku)
- Mayonaka no Senshi (真夜中の戦士) (September 11, 1981 – October 29, 1982, Shonen Magazine Special Issue)
- Cinderella Kishi (シンデレラ騎士, Cinderella Knight) (October 9, 1981 – April 23, 1982, Weekly Margaret)
- Ongaku Sogai Sare Ningen (音楽疎外され人間) (January 1982, Sound Recorder Pal)
- Joshi Pro-Wres 2100 Nen (女子プロレス2100年) (February 1982, Just Comic)
- Super Nyan (スーパーにゃん) (March, April, June 1982, Comic BonBon)
- Tsubasa no Hito (翼の人, aka Human with Wings, Tsubasa no Hitobito, 翼の人々) (March 18 – July 22, 1982, Weekly Young Jump)
- Haru no Ame (青春の雨, 青春(はる)の雨), Seishun no Ame) (April 26, 1982, Young Magazine Special Issue)
- Tetsu Senshi Musashi (鉄戦士ムサシ, Iron Warrior Musashi) (April 1982-March 1983, Coro Coro Comic)
- Boku no Norakuro (ぼくののらくろ, I am Norakuro) (May 1982, Maru) A tribute to Suihō Tagawa's Norakuro.
- Mugen Senshi (夢幻戦士) (June 1982, Monthly Action Hero)
- Majuu Tairiku (魔獣大陸) (June 1982-January 1984, Yasei Jidai)
- Toki Suberi Shōjo (時すべり少女) (Summer 1982, Short Short Land)
- This is Daisuke (This is 大介) (August 11 – December 15, 1982, Weekly Shonen Magazine)
- Hana no Dokushin Chonga-man (花の独身チョンガーマン) (September 8, 1982, Young Magazine Special Issue - Business Jump)
- Harenchi Gakuen docking Toilet Hakase (ハレンチ学園DOCKINGトイレット博士, aka Harenchi Gakuen vs Toilet Hakase, ハレンチ学園ドッキングトイレット博士, ハレンチ学園VSトイレット博士) (September 9, 1982, Weekly Young Jump)
- Nagai Go no Vita Vita Vita Shi Sexualis (永井豪のヰタ·ヰタ·ヰタしいセクスアリス) (October 4, 1982, "Happy Wedding" pamphlet)
- Mariko Wild (マリコ·ワイルド) (October 7, 1982, Weekly Young Jump) Scenario by Chiaki Kawamata.
- Kaiketsu Fukei-san (快ケツ婦警さん, 怪ケツ婦警さん) (November 28, 1982, Weekly Manga Action)
- Yume Shōjo Rei (夢少女レイ) (January 17, 1983, Young Magazine)
- Iron Muscle (アイアンマッスル) (February 2 – November 30, 1983, Weekly Shonen Magazine)
- Bokutachi Dotei Tai (ぼくたちドーテー隊) (March 7, 1983, Young Magazine)
- Ore no Lolita (おれのロリータ) (April 5, 1983, Weekly Playboy)
- Abu No Gakuen (アブNO学園) (April 18 – June 20, 1983, Young Magazine)
- Tetsu no Shōjo JUN (鉄の処女JUN, aka Iron Virgin Jun) (May 15 – November 15, 1983, Big Comic Spirits)
- Koi no Itami wa Chotokkyu (恋の痛みは超特急, 恋のいたみは超特急) (May 1983, Just Comic)
- Oni (鬼[ONI]) (June 1983, Epic Illustrated) This is a special oneshot for the US market published in Epic Illustrated #18 by Marvel Comics.
- Psycho Armor Govarian (サイコアーマー ゴーバリアン) (August 1983, (?)) Credited as original work. Art by Tatsuo Yasuda
- Choshojo UFO (超少女UFO) (October 1983-March 1984, Chū'ichi Jidai)
- Chonoryoku Senshi Jenes (超能力戦士ジェネス, Psycho Armor Jenes, サイコ·アーマー·ジェネス) (October 1983, SF Adventure Special Issue/February–May 1984, SF Adventure) Co-production with Yasutaka Nagai.
- Barabanba (バラバンバ) (October 13, 1983 – August 9, 1984, Sukora)
- God Mazinger (ゴッドマジンガー, originally Mazin Densetsu 魔神伝説) (May 15, 1984, Tankōbon Egaki Oroshi)
- Dodzilla Sensei (ドジラセンセー, ドジラーセンセー) (March 1984-August 1985, Shogaku San-nensei/September–October, 1984, Bessatsu CoroCoro Comic/October 1984-August 1985, Monthly CoroCoro Comic)
- Harenchi Mama-san (ハレンチママさん) (January 7, 1985, Leed Comic)
- Makai Suikoden no Tatari (魔界水滸伝のたたり) (May 1985, Yasei Jidai)
- Pink no Green (ピンクのグリーン) (May 1985, Big Golf Comic)
- Sensation (先セーション) (May 29, June 5, September 4, 1985, Weekly Manga Action)
- Susano OH Densetsu Himiko (凄ノ王伝説火神子) (June 1985-March 1986, Variety)
- Comic Yu Sei Sho (コミック郵性省) (September 1985, Yasei Jidai), scenario by Yasutaka Tsutsui.
- Isoginchaku Summer (イソギンチャクサマー) (September 9, 1985, Heibon Punch)
- Machine Gun Keiji Sabu (マシンガン刑事さぶ) (January 18 – May 19, 1986, Comic Woo)
- Sono Go no Hige Godzilla (その後のヒゲゴジラ) (August 1986, AVIC)
- Samurai Nippon (サムライ日本, aka Samurai Japan, サムライJAPAN, さむらいJAPAN) (August 25 – October 20, 1986, Big Comic Spirits)
- Rambo Sensei (ランボーセンセー) (December 19, 1986 – March 27, 1987, Shōnen Takarajima)
- Koppo Densetsu Yume Hissatsu Ken (骨法伝説夢必殺拳) (January–August 1987, Monthly Shonen Magazine)
- Barabanba 2 (バラバンバ2) (April 14 – November 15, 1987, Comic Burger)
- Shin Susano OH (新·凄ノ王) (July 14, 1987, COMIC Hunter)
- 2100 Nen Uchu no Min (2100年宇宙の民) (1988, Gokura Comics) Special pamphlet for the Seibu department stores
- Full Metal Lady (フルメタルレディ) (August 1988, February, April 1989, Bears Club)
- Mazinger (December 1988, First Publishing), this is a special oneshot released specifically for the US market, in English and in full-colour by the now defunct company First Comics. Also known as Mazinger U.S.A. version or (incorrectly) Mazinwarrior.
- Bubble Angel (バブルエンジェル) (January 3, 1989, Weekly Manga Sunday)
- V (V(ブイ)) (February 1989, Keibunsha) Original by Kenneth Johnson, art by Tatsuya Yasuda.
- Jushin Liger (獣神ライガー) (March 1989-January 1990, Comic BomBom)
- Susano OH Densetsu Yami no Majin Hen (凄ノ王伝説·闇の魔人編) (April 1989-April 1990, Yasei Jidai)
- Susano OH Densetsu Gaiden (凄ノ王伝説外伝) (May–June 1989, Comic Comp)
- Watashi no Deai Tai!! Riso no Tsuppari (私の出会いたい!!理想のツッパリ) (June 13, 1989, NEW Punch Zaurus)
- Super Saiyuki (スーパー西遊記) (Summer 1989-Winter 1990, Comic GENKI)

== 1990s ==
- Kabushikigaisha Tokugawa Ieyasu (株式会社徳川家康) (1990-02-18) Scenario by Masaharu Shingu.
- ZIPANG (1990-02)
- Red String (1990-03-08)
- Kamasutra (カーマスートラ) (1990-03-31) Composition by Kunio Nagatani.
- Getter Robo Go (ゲッターロボ號, known in many parts of the world as Venger Robot) (1991-02) Art by Ken Ishikawa. Along with the main version with Ishikawa, two other versions were published, one drawn by Tatsuya Yasuda in the Monthly TV-kun and the other by Ishikawa in Bessatsu Coro Coro Comic Special, both published by Shogakukan
- MazinSaga (マジンサーガ) (1990-01-01·07)
- Kuso Kagaku Ninkyoden: Gokudo Ninja Dosuryu (空想科学任侠伝 極道忍者ドス竜) (1990-11-07) Art by Shinoyama Isami
- 60 Oku no Kyouryu Tachi (60億の恐竜たち) (1991-05-15)
- Kando Onsen (感動温泉) (1991-05-28)
- Kantoku-kun (カントクくん) (1991-05-30)
- Mist Story (ミストストーリー) (1991-06)
- Game Senshi Animard (ゲーム戦士アニマード) (1991-07-26)
- Ippatsu Hyakuman Moshi Uke Soro (一発百万申し受け候, aka Golf Gambler) (1991-08)
- Reikai Tanken (霊界探検) (1991-09-01)
- CB Chara Nagai Go World Gekitotsu! Shin Shun Kakushigei Taikai (CBキャラ永井豪ワールド激突!新春かくし芸大会) (1992-01-01)
- Hito Koma Manga (ヒトコママンガ) (1992-03-17)
- Robochoi A (ロボチョイA) (1992-06)
- Kabushikigaisha Tokugawa Ieyasu (株式会社徳川家康) (1992-07) Scenario by Masaharu Shingu
- MazinSaga (マジンサーガ) (1991-08)
- Cutey Honey 90's (Q-teyハニー, Cutie Honey) (1992-07-08)
- Oni Gokko (鬼ごっこ) (1993-01)
- Yami no Utage: Shutendoji I Bun (闇の宴 酒天童子異聞) (1993-01)
- Oni Kon Shiki (鬼婚式) (1993-02)
- Drag Kyoryu Ken (ドラグ恐竜剣) (1993-03)
- Violence Jack Mao Korin Hen (バイオレンスジャック魔王降臨編) (1993-11-01)
- Shin Mao Dante (真・魔王ダンテ) (1994) Credited as original work, art by Akira Fuuga.
- The Bird (THE BIRD, ザ·バード) (1994-04-28)
- Heisei Harenchi Gakuen (平成ハレンチ学園) (1994-05-13)
- Taiga (manga) (大牙(タイガ)) (1994-08)
- Dante Shinkyoku: Jigoku Hen (ダンテ神曲 地獄編) (1994-09)
- Yushi Dandan (勇士ダンダン, Dandan The Warrior) (1994-10)
- Harenchi Komon Manyuki (ハレンチ紅門マン遊記) (1994-12-16)
- Memory Glass (メモリーグラス) (1995-03-15)
- Dante Shinkyoku: Rengoku Hen · Tengoku Hen (ダンテ神曲 煉獄編·天国編) (1995-10)
- Heisei Harenchi Gakuen (平成ハレンチ学園) (1995-12-05)
- Lovely Angel (ラブリーエンジェル) (1996-01-04·11)
- Shinwa Taisen: Ramayana hen (神話大戦·ラーマヤナ編) (1996-01-31)
- Gosenzo-kun (ゴセンゾくん) (1996-08)
- Devil Lady (デビルマンレディー) (1997-01-30)
- Go Dan Jiraiya (豪談児雷也) (1997-04-25)
- Kyuketsu Onsen e Yokoso (吸血温泉へようこそ) (1997-05)
- Go Dan Kirigakure Saizo (豪談霧隠才蔵) (1997-05-25)
- Go Dan Sarutobi Sasuke (豪談猿飛佐助) (1997-06-20)
- Go Dan Goto Matabei (豪談後藤又兵衛) (1997-07-20)
- Go Dan Sanada Gunki (豪談真田軍記) (1997-08-20)
- Go Dan Araki Mataemon (豪談荒木又右衛門) (1997-09-10)
- Go Go Suite (ゴー·ゴースイート) (1997-10-10) This story was meant to be his first professional work before Meakashi Polikichi, but it wasn't finished on time. It was going to be published in the magazine Bokura by Kodansha. It was printed in the artbook GO NAGAI All His Works for the first time.
- I Ji Gen no Marta (慰自元のマルタ) (1997-10-25)
- Space Fairy ASTRA (スペースフェアリーASTRA) (1998-04-07)
- Go Dan Iwami Jutaro (豪談岩見重太郎) (1998-05-10)
- Neo Devilman (ネオデビルマン) (1998-05-20)
- Go Dan Raiden Tameemon (豪談雷電右衛門) (1998-07-20)
- Devilman in the Dark (デビルマンイン·ザ·ダーク) (1998-08-08)
- Z Mazinger (Zマジンガー) (1998-09)
- Go Dan Hidari Jingoro (豪談左甚五郎) (1998-09-20)
- MazinSaga (マジンサーガ) (1998-09-30)
- Devilman Lady Tokubetsu Hen: Snake (デビルマンレディー特別編 スネーク) (1998-10-04)
- Go Dan Musashibo Benkei (豪談武蔵坊弁慶) (1998-11-10)
- Devilman Ghost (デビルマンゴースト) (1999-01-14)
- Essay-kun (エッセイ君, えっせい君) (1999)
- Kishin (機神) (1999-08)
- Vampire Kop (ヴァンパイアコップ) (1999-08-05)
- Yutai-kun Kiki Ippatsu (幽体くん危機一髪) (1999-08-05)
- Amon: The Darkside of The Devilman (AMON デビルマン黙示録) (1999-08) Credited as original work, scenario and art by Yuu Kinutani

== 2000s ==
- Sengun (戦群) (2000-05-09) Original work by Eiji Yoshikawa.
- Dororon Enbi-chan (どろろん艶靡ちゃん) (2000–12)
- Salacia ~Waga Hakugin no Mermaid~ (サラーキア〜我が白銀のマーメイド〜) (2001–03)
- Sharaku (帝都女記者伝 写·らく, Teito Jokishaden Sharaku) (2001-04-12)
- Kenju Obasan (拳銃おばさん, original work by Jun Itoh) (2001–06)
- Omorai-kun 2001 (オモライくん2001) (2001–07)
- Cutie Honey, the legend of an angel (キューティーハニー 天女伝説, Cutie Honey: Tennyo Densetsu, Cutie Honey '21) (2001–08)
- Mazinkaizer ~Shin Majin Densetsu~ (マジンカイザー〜新魔神伝説〜) (2001–09)
- Violence Jack Sengoku Majinden (バイオレンスジャック戦国魔人伝, Violence Jack - Demons in a War-Torn Land) (2001–12)
- Satan Claus (サタンクロース) (2002-02)
- Mao Dante - Apocalypse (魔王ダンテ神略編, 魔王ダンテ現魔編, 魔王ダンテ魔道編, 魔王ダンテ神魔大戦編) (2002–03) The title is really Mao Dante, but in order to differentiate this remake from the original manga of 1971, it is added Apocalypse as d/visual does.
- Gomaden Shutendoji (降魔伝 手天童子) (2002–10, released on 2002-08-19) Credited as original work, art by Masato Natsumoto.
- Date Masamune (伊達政宗) (2002–12)
- Kekko Kamen P (けっこう仮面P, Kekko Kamen Peach) (2003) Credited as original work. Scenario by Shigemitsu Harada, art by Seiju Minato
- Bijo to Yaju (美女と野獣) (2003-02-15)
- Kekko Kamen R (けっこう仮面R, art by Tatsuya Egawa) (2003-07-04)
- Harenchi Golfer Jubei (ハレンチゴルファー十べえ) (2003-08-14)
- Cutie Honey a Go Go! (キューティーハニー a Go Go!) (2003-11-28) Project by Hideaki Anno, art by Shimpei Itoh.
- Devilman·Honey (デビルマン·ハニー) (2004-02)
- Tenku no Inu (天空之狗) (2004-04)
- Majin Oh Gallon (魔神王ガロン, The Devil King Gallon) (2004-05) Original work by Osamu Tezuka.
- Dynamic Heroes (ダイナミックヒーローズ) (2004-06) Credited as original work, art by Kazuhiro Ochi. This manga is a web comic which was later compiled in tankōbon.
- Cutie Honey Seed (キューティーハニーSEED) (2004-06-22) Credited as original work, art by Komugi Hoshino
- Kochuten (娘中天) (2004-07-11, released on 2004-06-28)
- Mazinger Angels (マジンガーエンジェル) (2004-08, released on 2004-06-26) Credited as original work, art by Akihiko Niina in cooperation with PLEX.
- Occult Dan D^{3} (オカルト団D^{3}) (2004-08, released on 2004-06-26) Credited as original work, art by Nori Ochazuke.
- Hare * Aba Omoide 1 Koma (ハレ☆あば思い出1コマ) (2004-10, released on 2004-08-26)
- Houjo Souun (北条早雲) (2005-02, released on 2004-12-21)
- Shin Violence Jack (新バイオレンスジャック) (2005-05)
- Black Jack ~Arashi no Yoru ni~ (ブラック·ジャック〜嵐の夜に〜, ブラック·ジャックALIVE-嵐の夜に, Black Jack ALIVE - Arashi no Yoru ni) (2005-05-20, released on 2005-04-12) Original work by Osamu Tezuka.
- The Apocalypse of Devilman: Strange Days (デビルマン黙示録 STRANGE DAYS) (2005-5-24)
- Tenku no Inu - Edo no Yami Hen (天空之狗 江戸の闇編) (2005-06-06)
- Horror Takuhaibin (ホラー宅配便, Horror Express Delivery Service) (2005-07)
- Kinshiro Burai Sakura (金四郎無頼桜) (2006-03, released on 2006-01-21)
- Maeda Toshiie (前田利家) (2006-05, released on 2006-03-20)
- Kikoushi Enma (鬼公子炎魔, Demon Prince Enma, 鬼公子炎魔 雷帝地獄変·序章, Kikoushi Enma - Raitei Jigokuhen Josho) (2006-05, released on 2006-03-25)
- Wanda-kun (ワンだ君) (2007-01, released on 2006-12-15)
- Harenchi Gakuen 2007 (ハレンチ学園2007) (2007-01-15) Credited as original work, scenario by Masayuki Kondo, art by Teruto Aruga.
- Akakon Suzunosuke (赤褌鈴乃介) (2007-03, released on 2007-01-25)
- Kingoro to Marilyn na Hibi (金五郎とマリリンな日々) (2007-03, released on 2007-01-25)
- Nagai Go 40-nen no Kiseki (永井豪40年のキセキ) (2007-03, released on 2007-01-25)
- Senjo no Robotto (戦場のロボっ人) (2007-03, released on 2007-01-25)
- Sirène Tanjo Hen (シレーヌ誕生編) (2007-03, released on 2007-01-25)
- Suiko (翠湖) (2007-03, released on 2007-01-25)
- Yokai no Kao (妖怪の顔) (2007-03, released on 2007-01-25)
- Harenchi Gakuen ~The Company~ (ハレンチ学園〜ザ·カンパニー〜, The Shameless School ~The company~) (2007-03-01) Credited as original work, art by Teruto Aruga.
- Akuma Kishi (悪魔騎士, Devil Knight) (2007-03-23)
- Tantei Jimusho H.G (探偵事務所H·G) (2007-07-03, released on 2007-06-19)
- Satanikus ENMA Kerberos (SatanikusENMAケルベロス) (2007-08, released on 2007-06-26) Credited as original work, art by Eiji Toriyama.
- Getter Robot Hien ~The Earth suicide~ (ゲッターロボ飛焔 〜THE EARTH SUICIDE〜) (2007-08-28) This manga is a web comic which is later compiled in tankōbon. Credited as original work along with Ken Ishikawa, art by Naoto Tsushima
- Mazinger Angels Z (マジンガーエンジェルZ) (2008-02, released on 2007-12-26)
- Satsujinsha (殺刃者, Satsu Jin Sha, さつじんしゃ) (2008-02, released on 2007-12-26) This is the prototype for Kuro no Shishi, published for the first time as part of the commemoration of Nagai's 40 years career.
- Honey & Yukiko-hime: Cutie Heroine Daisakusen (ハニー&雪子姫 キューティーヒロイン大作戦) (2008-02-22) This is a mobile phone comic published weekly by Konami. Credited as original work, art by Kazuhiro Ochi
- Kyoryu Teikoku kara Kita Shōjo (恐竜帝国から来た少女) (2008-03-24)
- Watashi to Shōnen Sunday (私と少年サンデー) (2008-06-04, released on 2008-05-02)
- Gisho Getter Robot Dash (偽書ゲッターロボDASH, Apocrypha Getter Robot Dash) (2008–09, released on 2008-07-26) Credited as original work along with Ken Ishikawa, art by Hideaki Nishikawa.
- Manga Kaido Hitoritabi (マンガ街道一人旅) (2008)
- Hono no Tora Shingen (炎の虎 信玄) (2008–12, released on 2008-10-27)
- Shogun Ken: Ichi no Tachi (将軍剣 一の太刀) (2009-01, released on 2008-12-13)
- Mugen Utamaro (夢幻ウタマロ) (2009-02, released on 2008-12-25)
- Cutie Honey vs Abashiri Ikka (キューティーハニーVSあばしり一家) (2009-04-16)
- Shin Mazinger Zero (真マジンガーZERO) (2009-06, released on 2009-04-18) Credited as original work, scenario by Yoshiaki Tabata, art by Yuki Yogo
- Gisho Getter Robot Darkness (偽書ゲッターロボ ダークネス) (2009-05-01) Credited as original work along with Ken Ishikawa, art by Hideaki Nishikawa.
- Reikai Door (霊界ドアー) (2009-06-05) This is a mobile phone comic published weekly by Sony Digital Entertainment Services.
- Shin Mazinger Shogeki! H Hen (真マジンガー 衝撃!H編) (2009-08-19)
- Mazinger Otome (マジンガー乙女) (2009-10-08) This is a mobile phone comic published by Media Factory. Credited as original work, art by Mikio Tachibana.

== 2010s ==
- Mazinkaizer SKL Versus (マジンカイザーSKLヴァーサス) (2010-04-23) This is a mobile phone comic book published by Emotion Credited as original work, cartoon by Kazumi Hoshi
- Shururun Yukiko Hime-chan feat. Dororon Enma-kun (シュルルン雪子姫ちゃん feat.ドロロンえん魔くん) (2010-10-04) Credited as original work, cartoon by Sae Amatsu
- Devilman tai Getter Robo (デビルマン対ゲッターロボ) (2010-06, released on 2010-04-19)
- Geki-man! (激マン!) (2010-06-04, released on 2010-05-21)
- Mazinger Otome Taisen (マジンガー乙女) (2010-12-09) Credited as original work, art by Mikio Tachibana.
- Maou Dante tai Getter Robo G (魔王ダンテ対ゲッターロボG) (2011)
- Time Slipper Tamahime (タイム・スリッパー珠姫) (2011)
- Enma vs: Dororon Enma-kun Gaiden (炎魔VS ドロロンえん魔くん外伝) (2010-07-07) Credited as original work, cartoon by Masaki Segawa
- Devilman G (デビルマンG) (2012-03-19) Credited as original work, cartoon by Rui Takato
- Honey VS (ハニーVS) (2012) Credited as original work, cartoon by Masaki Segawa
- Mazinger Z vs. Kekko Kamen (マジンガーvsけっこう仮面) (2012) Credited as original work, cartoon by Takeshi Okano
- Sirene-chan (シレーヌちゃん) (2012)
- Shin Mazinger Zero vs Ankoku Daishogun (真マジンガーZEROvs暗黒大将軍) (2012) Credited as original work, scenario by Yoshiaki Tabata, art by Yuki Yogo
- Devilman vs Hades (デビルマン対闇の帝王) (2012) Credited as original work, cartoon by Team Moon
- Dororo to Enma-kun (どろろとえん魔くん) (2013) Original work by Osamu Tezuka
- Devilman Lady vs Cutey Honey (キューティーハニーvsデビルマンレディー) (2013)
- Dino Getter (ダイノゲッタ) (2014) Credited as original work along with Ken Ishikawa, scenario and art by Kazumi Hoshi
- Devilman Saga (デビルマンサーガ) (2014)
- Grendizer Giga (グレンダイザー ギガ) (2014)
- Gekiman! Mazinger Z Hen (激マン! マジンガーZ編) (2014)
- Majin Battle (マジンバトル) (2015) Credited as original work along with Ken Ishikawa, scenario and art by Takafumi Adachi
- Cyborg 009 Vs Devilman: Breakdown((サイボーグ009 VS デビルマン —BREAKDOWN—) (2015) Credited as original work along with Shotaro Ishinomori, scenario and art by Akihito Yoshitomi
- Koutetsu Jeeg Hiryuuden (鋼鉄ジーグ秘龍伝) (2016) Credited as original work, scenario and art by Shinobu Kaze
- Getter Robo Devolution - Uchuu Saigo no 3-bunkann (ゲッターロボ DEVOLUTION ~宇宙最後の3分間~) (2016) Credited as original work along with Ken Ishikawa, scenario by Eiichi Shimizu and art by Tomohiro Shimoguchi
- Getter Robo High (ゲッターロボ牌) (2017) Credited as original work along with Ken Ishikawa, scenario and art by Drill Jill
- Gekiman! Cutie Honey Hen (激マン！キューティーハニー編) (2017)
- Mazinger Z Alter Ignition (マジンガーZ アルターイグニッション) (2017) Credited as original work, scenario and art by Yuu Kinutani
- Mazinger Z Interval Peace (マジンガーZ インターバルピース) (2017) Credited as original work, scenario and art by UME
- Gekiman! Z & Great Hen (激マン!Z&グレート編) (2018)
- Mazinger Z vs Transformers (マジンガーZ 対 トランスフォーマー) (2019) Credited as original work, special cover, various assistant credits

== 2020s ==
- Violence Jack 20XX (バイオレンスジャック 20XX) (February 19, 2021 – November 21, 2022, Monthly Young Magazine) Credited as original work, scenario and art by Yuu Kinutani
- Yagyuu Hadaka Shinken (柳生裸真剣) (February 19, 2021 – Present, Weekly Post)
- Devilman Gaiden -Ningen Senki- (デビルマン外伝ー人間戦記ー) (January 23, 2023 – June 20, 2023, Monthly Young Magazine) Credited as original work, scenario and art by Fujihiko Hosono
- Mazinger Z Destroying Hell ( 破獄のマジンガー, Mazinger of Hell) (March, 2023, Hobby Japan Web) Credited as original work, scenario and art by Kazumi Hoshi
- Grendizer U: The Inception (June 28, 2024 - Present, Comiplex) Credited as original work, scenario and art by 8KEY
- Cutie Honey Nova (キューティーハニー, Nova) (April 1, 2025 - Present, Hobby Japan Web) Credited as original work, scenario and art by Naoto Tsushima and desings by Nadare Takamine
- Chikyu Taisen 2053 (地球大戦2053) (July 3, 2026 - Weekly Manga Goraku)

== Anime titles created by or based on the works of Go Nagai / Dynamic Pro ==
- Devilman (デビルマン) (TV series, 1972-07-08)
- Mazinger Z (マジンガーZ) (TV series, 1972-12-03)
- Mazinger Z tai Devilman (マジンガーZ対デビルマン) (Movie, 1973-07-18)
- Dororon Enma-kun (ドロロンえん魔くん) (TV series, 1973-10-04)
- Cutie Honey (キューティーハニー, Cutey Honey) (TV series, 1973-10-13)
- Getter Robo (ゲッターロボ) (TV series, 1974-04-04) With Ken Ishikawa
- Mazinger Z tai Ankoku Daishougun (マジンガーZ対暗黒大将軍) (Movie, 1974-07-25)
- Great Mazinger (グレートマジンガー) (TV series, 1974-09-08)
- Great Mazinger tai Getter Robo (グレートマジンガー対ゲッターロボ) (Movie, 1975-03-21)
- Getter Robo G (ゲッターロボ G) (TV series, 1975-05-15)
- Great Mazinger vs. Getter Robo G: Kuchu Daigekitotsu (グレートマジンガー対ゲッターロボG 空中大激突, Great Mazinger tai Getter Robo G: The Great Space Encounter) (Movie, 1975-07-26)
- Uchuu Enban Daisensou (宇宙円盤大戦争, The Great Battle of the Flying Saucers) (Movie, 1975-07-26)
- Koutetsu Jeeg (鋼鉄ジーグ) (TV series, 1975-10-05) Manga by Tatsuya Yasuda
- UFO Robot Grendizer (UFOロボ グレンダイザー) (TV series, 1975-10-05)
- UFO Robot Grendizer tai Great Mazinger (UFOロボ グレンダイザー対グレートマジンガー) (Movie, 1976-03-20)
- Groizer X (グロイザーX, Gloizer X) (TV series, 1976-07-01) Created with Gosaku Ota
- Grendizer, Getter Robo G, Great Mazinger: Kessen! Daikaijuu (グレンダイザー・ゲッターロボG・グレートマジンガー 決戦!大海獣) (Movie, 1976-07-18)
- Majokko Tickle (魔女っ子チックル) (TV series, 1978-03-06)
- Psycho Armor Govarian (サイコアーマーゴーバリアン) (TV series, 1983-07-06)
- God Mazinger (ゴッドマジンガー) (TV series, 1984-04-15)
- Chounouryoku Shōjo Barabanba (超能力少女バラバンバ) (OVA, 1985-06-21)
- Mujigen Hunter Fandora (夢次元ハンター ファンドラ, Dream Dimension Hunter Fandora) (OVA, 1985-09-21)
- Violence Jack: Harem Bomber (バイオレンスジャック ハーレムボンバー, Violence Jack: Slumking) (OVA, 1986-06)
- Devilman: Tanjo Hen (デビルマン 誕生編, Devilman: The Birth) (OVA, 1987-11-01)
- Violence Jack: Evil Town (バイオレンスジャック 地獄街, Violence Jack: Jigokugai) (OVA, 1988-12-21)
- Jushin Liger (獣神ライガー, Beast-God Riger) (TV series, 1989-03-11)
- Shutendoji (手天童子, Shuten Douji) (OVA, 1989-12)
- Devilman: Yocho Sirène Hen (デビルマン 妖鳥シレーヌ編, Devilman: The Demon Bird) (OVA, 1990-02-25)
- Violence Jack: Hell's Wind Hen (バイオレンスジャック ヘルスウインド編, Violence Jack: Hell's Wind) (OVA, 1990-11-09)
- Getter Robo Go (ゲッターロボ號) (TV series, 1991-02-11) With Ken Ishikawa
- CB Chara Nagai Go World (CBキャラ永井豪ワールド) (OVA, 1991-02-21)
- Abashiri Family (あばしり一家, Abashiri Ikka) (OVA, 1991-05-21)
- Kekko Kamen (けっこう仮面) (OVA, 1991-08-01)
- Kyukioku no Sex Adventure Kamasutra (究極のSEXアドベンチャー カーマスートラ) (1992-04-24)
- Iron Virgin Jun (鉄の処女JUN, Tetsu no Shōjo JUN) (OVA, 1992-07)
- Oira Sukeban (おいら女蛮(スケバン), (Sukeban Boy, Delinquent in Drag) (OVA, 1992-08)
- Hanappe Bazooka (花平バズーカ) (OVA, 1992-09)
- Black Lion (黒の獅士, Kuro no Shishi) (OVA, 1992-11)
- New Cutey Honey (新・キューティーハニー, Shin Cutey Honey) (OVA, 1994-04)
- Heisei Harenchi Gakuen (平成ハレンチ学園) (OVA, 1996-03)
- Harenchi Koumon Manyuuki (ハレンチ紅門マン遊記) (OVA, 1996-05)
- Cutey Honey F (キューティーハニーF(ﾌﾗｯｼｭ)) (TV series, 1997-02)
- Cutey Honey F (キューティーハニーF(ﾌﾗｯｼｭ)) (Movie, 1997-07)
- Shin Getter Robo: Sekai Saigo no Hi (真ゲッターロボ｢世界最後の日｣, Getter Robo: Armageddon)) (OVA, 1998-08) With Ken Ishikawa
- Devilman Lady (デビルマンレディー) (TV series, 1998-10)
- Amon: The Apocalypse of Devilman (デビルマン黙示録) (OVA, 2000–05)
- Shin Getter Robot tai Neo Getter Robot (真ゲッターロボ対ネオゲッターロボ) (OVA, 2000–12) With Ken Ishikawa
- Mazinkaiser (マジンカイザー) (OVA, 2001–09)
- Demon Lord Dante (魔王ダンテ, Mao Dante) (TV series, 2002–08)
- Mazinkaiser: Death! The Great General of Darkness (マジンカイザー 死闘!暗黒大将軍, Mazinkaiser: Shitou! Ankoku Daishogun) (OVA, 2003–07)
- New Getter Robo (新ゲッターロボ, Shin Getter Robo) (OVA, 2004-04) With Ken Ishikawa
- Panda-Z - The Robonimation (パンダーゼット THE ROBONIMATION) (TV series, 2004-04)
- Re: Cutie Honey (Re:キューティーハニー) (OVA, 2004–07)
- Demon Prince Enma (鬼公子炎魔, Kikoushi Enma) (OVA, 2006–08)
- Koutetsushin Jeeg (鋼鉄神ジーグ, Steel God Jeeg) (TV series, 2007-04)
- Shin Mazinger Shougeki! Z Hen (真マジンガー 衝撃! Z編 ) (TV series, 2009-04)
- Mazinkaizer SKL (マジンカイザーSKL) (OVA, 2010–11)
- Dororon Enma-kun Meeramera (Dororonえん魔くん メ~ラめら) (TV series, 2011-04-07)
- Mazinger ZIP! (マジンガーZIP!) (TV series, 2013–04-08)
- Robot Girls Z (ロボットガールズZ) (TV series, 2014-01-04)
- Robot Girls Z Plus (ロボットガールズZプラス) (TV series, 2015-05-20)
- Cyborg 009 VS Devilman (サイボーグ009VSデビルマン) (OVA, 2015-11) Cyborg 009 manga by Shotaro Ishinomori
- Mazinger Z Infinity (劇場版マジンガーZ) (Movie, 2017-10, Italy release)
- Devilman Crybaby (DEVILMAN crybaby) (ONA, 2018-05-01)
- Cutie Honey Universe (Cutie Honey Universe) (TV series, 2018-04-08)
- Robot Girls NEO (ロボットガールズNEO) (ONA, 2018)
- Getter Robo Arc (ゲッターロボ アーク) (TV series, 2021) With Ken Ishikawa
- Grendizer U (グレンダイザーU) (TV Series, 2024)

These following anime titles were based on the works of Go Nagai's assistants.

- Kyomu Senshi Miroku (虚無戦史MIROKU, Kyomu Senshi Miroku) (OVA, 1989-01-10) Manga by Ken Ishikawa
- Maju Sensen (魔獣戦線, Maju Sensen) (OVA, 1990-10-01) Manga by Ken Ishikawa
- Maju Sensen THE APOCALYPSE (魔獣戦線 THE APOCALYPSE, Maju Sensen THE APOCALYPSE) (TV series, 2003–02-23) Manga by Ken Ishikawa
- The Gakuen Chojō-tai (ザ・学園超女隊, The Gakuen Chojō-tai) (OVA, 1991-06-27) Novel by Tatsuhiko Dan, planning by Dynamic Planning

The following title was based on the works of Dynamic Planning.

- Machine Hayabusa* (マシンハヤブサ, Machine Hayabusa) (TV series, 1976-04-02) Created by Dynamic Planning and Mikiya Mochizuki

== Tokusatsu/Live action created by or based on the works of Go Nagai / Dynamic Pro ==
- Harenchi Gakuen (ハレンチ学園) (Movie, 1970-05-02)
- Harenchi Gakuen: Shintai Kensa no Maki (ハレンチ学園 身体検査の巻) (Movie, 1970-08-01)
- Harenchi Gakuen: Tackle Kiss no Maki (ハレンチ学園 タックル・キッスの巻) (Movie, 1970-09-12)
- Harenchi Gakuen (ハレンチ学園) (TV series, 1970-10-01)
- Shin Harenchi Gakuen (新ハレンチ学園) (Movie, 1971-01-03)
- Battle Hawk (バトルホーク) (TV series, 1976-10-04)
- Pro-Wres no Hoshi Aztecaser (プロレスの星 アステカイザー) (TV series, 1976-10-07)
- X Bomber (Xボンバー, 超宇宙マシーンエックスボンバー, Super Space Machine X Bomber, Star Fleet)[TV series, 1980-10-04)
- Nagai Go no Kowai Zone: Kaiki (永井豪のこわいゾーン 怪鬼) (Movie, 1989-08-25)
- Nagai Go no Kowai Zone 2: Senki (永井豪のこわいゾーン2 戦鬼) (Movie, 1990-08-24)
- The Ninja Dragon (空想科学任侠伝 極道忍者ドス竜, Kuso Kagaku Ninkyoden: Gokudo Ninja Dosuryu) (Movie, 1990-10-25)
- Kekko Kamen (けっこう仮面) (Movie, 1991-03-22)
- Bishōjo Tantei Maboroshi Panty (美少女探偵 まぼろしパンティ) (Movie, 1991-11-25)
- Kekko Kamen 2: We'll be back... (けっこう仮面2, けっこう仮面2 We'll be back・・・) (Movie, 1992-03-27)
- Nagai Go no Horror Gekijo: Mannequin (永井豪のホラー劇場 マネキン) (Movie, 1992-04-24)
- Oira Sukeban: Kessen! Pansuto (おいら女蛮 決戦!パンス党) (Movie, 1992-07-24)
- Nagai Go no Horror Gekijo: Kirikagami (永井豪のホラー劇場 霧加神) (Movie, 1992-08-28)
- Kekko Kamen 3 (けっこう仮面3) (Movie, 1993-04-23)
- Jushin Thunder Liger: Fist of Thunder (獣神サンダーライガー 怒りの雷鳴 FIST OF THUNDER) (Movie, 1995-02-21)
- Heisei Harenchi Gakuen (平成ハレンチ学園) (Movie, 1996-02-02)
- Kyuketsu Onsen e Yokoso (吸血温泉にようこそ) (Movie, 1997-04-21)
- Lovely Angel: Homon Soap Degozaimasu (ラブリー・エンジェル 訪問ソープでございます) (Movie, 1997-09-26)
- Lovely Angel 2: Taiketsu! Homon Soap Jo vs Shuccho SM Jo!! (ラブリー・エンジェル2 対決!訪問ソープ嬢vs出張SM嬢!!) (Movie, 1997-11-28)
- Kekko Kamen (けっこう仮面, Mask of Kekkou) (Movie, 2004-02-06)
- Nagai Go World: Maboroshi Panty VS Henchin Pokoider (永井豪ワールド まぼろしパンティVSへんちんポコイダー) (Movie, 2004-05-10)
- Cutie Honey (キューティーハニー) (Movie, 2004-05-29)
- Kekko Kamen: Mangriffon no Gyakushu (けっこう仮面 マングリフォンの逆襲, Kekko Kamen: The MGF Strikes Back!) (Movie, 2004–07-23)
- Devilman (デビルマン) (Movie, 2004-10-09)
- Kekko Kamen Returns (けっこう仮面 RETURNS) (Movie, 2004-10-31)
- Kekko Kamen Surprise!! (けっこう仮面 SURPRISE) (Movie, 2004-10-31)
- Kabuto-O Beetle (兜王ビートル) (Movie, 2005-07-16)
- Oira Sukeban (おいら女蛮) (Movie, 2006-02-04)
- Kekko Kamen Royale (けっこう仮面 ロワイヤル) (Movie, 2007-05-25)
- Kekko Kamen Premium (けっこう仮面 プレミアム) (Movie, 2007-06-22)
- Kekko Kamen Forever (けっこう仮面 フォーエバー) (Movie, 2007-07-27)
- Cutie Honey The Live (キューティーハニー THE LIVE) (TV series, 2007-10-02)
- Abashiri Ikka: The movie (あばしり一家 THE MOVIE) (Movie, 2009-11-21)
- Kekko Kamen Reborn (けっこう仮面 新生(リボーン), also known as Mask The Kekkou Reborn) (Movie, 2012-06-02)
- They Call Me Jeeg (Movie, 2015-17-10)
- Cutie Honey Tears (キューティー・ハニー ティアーズ) (Movie, 2016-10-01)
- Project Dreams - How to Build Mazinger Z's Hangar (前田建設ファンタジー営業部) (Movie, 2020-31-01)
- Lion-Girl (Movie, 2023)
- Cutie Honey: Beloved Enemy (キューティーハニー BELOVED ENEMY) (Short Series, 2025-11-25)

Additionally, Nagai appears as an actor in the following productions:

- The Toxic Avenger Part II (1989)
- Nijisseiki Shōnen Dokuhon (1989)
- Kekko Kamen 2: We'll be back... (1992)
- Nagai Go no Horror Gekijo: Mannequin (1992)
- Oira Sukeban: Kessen! Pansuto (1992)
- Mirai no Omoide: Last Christmas (1992)
- Metropolis (anime) (2001) Guest voice
- Kekko Kamen (2004)
- Nagai Go World: Maboroshi Panty VS Henchin Pokoider (2004)
- Cutie Honey (2004)
- Devilman (2004)
- Cutie Honey The Live (2007) episode 26 (DVD-only episode)

== Games created by or based on the works of Go Nagai / Dynamic Pro ==
- Ginga no Sannin (銀河の三人) (1987) (Famicom) (Character designer)
- Devilman (デビルマン) (1989) (Famicom)
- Susano Oh Densetsu (凄ノ王伝説) (1989) (PC Engine)
- CB Chara Wars - Ushinawareta Gag (CBキャラウォーズ 失われたギャ～グ) (1992) (Super Famicom)
- Mazin Saga (マジンサーガ) (1993) (Genesis)
- Mazinger Z (マジンガーZ) (1993) (Super Famicom)
- Shien: The Blade Chaser (紫炎～ザ・ブレイドチェイサー) (1994) (Super Famicom) (Character designer)
- Denjin Makai (電神魔傀) (1994) (Arcade & Super Famicom)
- Mazinger Z (マジンガーZ) (1994) (Arcade)
- Cutey Honey FX (キューティーハニーFX) (1995) (PC-FX)
- Getter Robo Daikessen! (ゲッターロボ大決戦!) (1999) (PlayStation)
- Devilman (デビルマ) (2000) (PlayStation)
- Legend of Dynamic Goushouden: Houkai no Rondo (レジェンド オブ ダイナミック 豪翔伝 崩界の輪舞曲) (2003) (Game Boy Advance)
- Mazin Da: Shin Mazinger Shogeki! Z-Hen (2010) (PC)
- Robot Girls Z Online (ロボットガールズZ Online) (2014) (PC)
- UFO Robot Grendizer: The Feast of the Wolves (2023) (PC, Xbox Series X, PlayStation 4 and 5, and the Nintendo Switch)
