= Great Mazinger vs. Getter Robo G: Kuchu Daigekitotsu =

1975 film by Masayuki Akehi

- Screenshot of the opening title.
- Directed by: Masayuki Akehi
- Screenplay by: Keisuke Fujikawa
- Produced by: Chiaki Imada
- Starring: Akira Kamiya; Jōji Yanami; Keaton Yamada; Keiichi Noda; Toku Nishio
- Music by: Michiaki Watanabe; Shunsuke Kikuchi
- Production company: Toei Animation
- Distributed by: Toei Company
- Release date: July 26, 1975
- Running time: 25 minutes
- Country: Japan
- Language: Japanese

Great Mazinger vs. Getter Robo G: Kuchu Daigekitotsu (グレートマジンガー対ゲッターロボG 空中大激突, Gurēto Majingā tai Gettā Robo Jī Kūchū Daigekitotsu; lit. Great Mazinger vs. Getter Robot G: Great Sky Clash) is an animated short film produced by Toei Doga. It is a crossover anime between Great Mazinger and Getter Robo G. It was originally shown in theaters along with Uchu Enban Daisenso. They both premiered in July 26, 1975 in Japan.

As with the rest of Toei's Mazinger Vs. animated films, the events presented in the film are not considered canon to either of the anime television series, but it is considered a direct sequel to the previous film Great Mazinger vs. Getter Robo.

Like most of the Mazinger movies, it was shown in some countries outside Japan where the TV series were broadcast. It is known as Il Grande Mazinga contro Getta Robot G in Italy, Gran Mazinger contra Getter Robo G in Spain and مازنجر الكبير يقاتل جيتا روب in the Middle East.

== Story ==
Aliens in a spaceship decide to conquer the Earth and begin by attacking the headquarters of the Getter Robo team while the Mazinger was being repaired so it could not go to their aid. One of the team members, Musashi, is killed in the battle with the alien monster Grangen and his vehicle is destroyed, meaning they can no longer form the first Getter Robo. However the laboratory already had a new Getter Robo ready for action named Getter Robo G and a new third pilot is elected. Meanwhile, Great Mazinger and his allies fight the invaders' giant robot Bong but it was just bait to lure it out so that the invaders could use their trump card: Pikadron. Getter Robo G arrives to help, but their combined beams only make Pikadron grow bigger. However Great Mazinger's pilot Tetsuya figures out how to strip this defense from the monster and destroys it with a new weapon. The alien spaceship is also destroyed and in the end everyone gets together to grieve the loss of Musashi.

=== Invaders ===
There are three alien monsters that serve as the antagonists of the movie. They were created by the Mysterious Invaders, the same race that created Gilgilgan in the previous movie. In Go Nagai's Dynamic Heroes the aliens were referred to as the Damdom and were revealed to be the arch enemies of the Vegan Empire from UFO Robo Grendizer.

- Grangen: Capable of flying and is armed with tentacled fingers, a bladed boomerang, and eye beams from its eyes capable of blinding enemy pilots. It is the only organism of the alien trio. It makes an appearance in Super Robot Wars MX.
- Bong: Is armed with military vehicle style weapons on its body including a tank cannon-like flamethrower on the torso, normal sized tank cannons all around the body, a drill for the right arm, eye beams, and has jets for feet. It is the only machine of the alien trio. It also appears in Super Robot Wars 2 and MX.
- Pikadron: The main antagonist of the movie and is made entirely out of light waves, making it impossible to kill unless it is solidified and will absorb energy to turn into its super form. Powers include electric balls from the mouth, emitting electricity, extendable tentacle fingers, an electric beam from its mouth, and in its super form it can fire seven electric beams from the chest and horns. Unlike its two cohorts it appears throughout various Super Robot Wars games and in them gains the ability to make clones of itself by being divided and can swim underwater, however it lacks its super form. Pikadron's overall frame most likely served as a basis for other Go Nagai monsters such as Zumezume, Mephisto Dance, Algoth, and Cobalt King.

== Staff ==
- Production: Toei Doga, Dynamic Production
- Original work: Go Nagai, Ken Ishikawa, Dynamic Production
- Director: Masayuki Akehi
- Scenario: Keisuke Fujikawa
- Planning: Ken Ariga, Kenji Yokoyama
- Producer: Chiaki Imada
- Animation director: Kazuo Komatsubara
- Assistant director: Johei Matsura
- Music: Michiaki Watanabe, Shunsuke Kikuchi
- Art director: Tomoh Fukumoto
- Cast: Akira Kamiya (Ryo Nagare), Junji Yamada (Hayato Jin), Keiichi Noda (Tetsuya Tsurugi), Toku Nishio (Musashi Tomoe), Joji Yanami (Benkei Kuruma), Kazuko Sawada (Shiro Kabuto), Kosei Tomita (Dr. Saotome), Rihoko Yoshida (Michiru Saotome), Yumi Nakatani (Jun Hono), Hidekatsu Shibata (Kenzo Kabuto)

== See also ==
- Great Mazinger
- Getter Robo G
- Great Mazinger vs. Getter Robo
