= Shuten-dōji (disambiguation) =

Shuten-dōji (酒呑童子) is a gigantic ruler of the Oni, creatures of Japanese folklore.

In popular culture:

- Shutendouji (朱天童子, Shutendōji), a character in the anime Ronin Warriors
- Shutendouji, a character in the anime Otogizoshi
- Shutendoji (手天童子, Shutendōji), a manga by Go Nagai
  - Shuten Doji (手天童子, Shuten dōji), a video game published by Enix in 1990, adapted from Go Nagai's manga
- Shuten-dōji (酒呑童子, Shuten-dōji), a professional wrestling stable founded by Kudo, Masahiro Takanashi and Yukio Sakaguchi.
- Jutendouji, a fusion monster used by Kurando in the PlayStation 2 game Shadow Hearts: Covenant
- Ninja Sentai Kakuranger has 2 Shutendouji as brothers who are the monsters of the week & appear in Mighty Morphin Alien Rangers as the Barbaric brothers.
