= Susano =

Susano may refer to:

- Susanoo, the Shinto god of the sea and storms
- Susano, Brazil, a city in São Paulo, Brazil
- Susano Oh, a Japanese manga created by Go Nagai
- Susanoo, a jutsu used by several Uchihas in the manga and anime series Naruto
