= Great Mazinger vs. Getter Robo =

1975 film by Masayuki Akehi

- Screenshot of the opening title.
- Directed by: Masayuki Akehi
- Screenplay by: Keisuke Fujikawa
- Based on: Great Mazinger and Getter Robo by Go Nagai, Ken Ishikawa and Dynamic Production
- Produced by: Chiaki Imada
- Starring: Akira Kamiya; Keaton Yamada; Keiichi Noda; Toku Nishio
- Music by: Michiaki Watanabe; Shunsuke Kikuchi
- Production company: Toei Animation
- Distributed by: Toei Company
- Release date: March 21, 1975
- Running time: 30 minutes
- Country: Japan
- Language: Japanese

Great Mazinger vs. Getter Robo (グレートマジンガー対ゲッターロボ, Gurēto Majingā tai Gettā Robo) is an animated short film produced by Toei based in the works of Go Nagai and Ken Ishikawa. The film premiered originally in March 21, 1975 in Japan. It is a crossover between the super robot anime Great Mazinger and Getter Robo, similar to the previous crossover film Mazinger Z vs. Devilman. The events presented in the film are not considered canon to either of the two series.

The film was also shown in countries where the two TV series were broadcast. It is known as مازنجر الكبير ضد جيتاروبو in Arabic countries, Grande Mazinga contro Getta Robot G in Italy and Gran Mazinger contra Getter Robo in Spain.

== Story ==
When a UFO appears over Japan, both the heroes of Great Mazinger and Getter Robo want to investigate it first, out of a sense of rivalry. Getter finds it first since the Mazinger robot is being repaired. However they are unable to defeat the apparently living vehicle. It had already dropped a metal-eating monster on Japan named Gilgilgan and Great Mazinger confronts it only to be badly beaten. Later, despite the robot pilots' protests, their two bases decide to join forces to stop Gilgilgan as he starts becoming more powerful and begins to change. They make a plan to lure it to an empty island where they can battle it without causing collateral damage. They get Boss to lure the monster there where it eats Boss Borot in the process. The combined heroes almost defeat Gilgilgan until the UFO returns and allows itself to be eaten to cause its own creation to grow to its final form. During the intense battle the heroes manage to find its weak points and destroy Gilgilgan. Afterward they promise to be friends from then on.

=== Gilgilgan ===
The primary antagonist of the movie, Gilgilgan is a tortoise-like bioweapon from outer space used to conquer Japan primarily by living on a diet of nothing but metal and slowly grows larger into two other forms. It possesses an extremely thick hide that prevents most attacks from harming it and for attacks it can fire yellow eye beams and green poison from its mouth that acts like a very strong acid. In his second form Gilgilan adds the ability to move underwater with the powers of his first form still intact. Once it eats its creator Gilgilgan will change into its third form which appears more like a demon where it can fly and its powers include finger lasers, bladed wings that can also fire energy beams, and has three whip-like tails.

Gilgilgan appears in various Super Robot Wars as well as a Banpresto original fourth form called Mecha Gilgilgan based on its third form that serves as the final boss in the first Super Robot Wars game and appears in other titles with the other forms. Mecha Gilgilgan's powers primarily consist of its ultra sharp claws, its wing beams, and very powerful waves of gravity from its body.

== Staff ==
- Production: Toei Doga, Dynamic Production
- Original work: Go Nagai, Ken Ishikawa, Dynamic Production
- Director: Masayuki Akehi
- Scenario: Keisuke Fujikawa
- Planning: Ken Ariga, Kenji Yokoyama
- Producer: Chiaki Imada
- Animation director: Kazuo Komatsubara
- Assistant director: Yuji Endo
- Music: Michiaki Watanabe, Shunsuke Kikuchi
- Art director: Tomo Fukumoto
- Cast: Akira Kamiya (Ryo Nagare), Junji Yamada (Hayato Jin), Keiichi Noda (Tetsuya Tsurugi), Toku Nishio (Musashi Tomoe), Hiroshi Otake (Boss), Kazuko Sawada (Shiro Kabuto), Kosei Tomita (Dr. Saotome), Rihoko Yoshida (Michiru Saotome), Yumi Nakatani (Jun Hono), Hidekatsu Shibata (Kenzo Kabuto)

== See also ==
- Great Mazinger
- Getter Robo
- Great Mazinger vs. Getter Robo G: Kuchu Daigekitotsu
