= Neverland (band) =

Japanese rock band

- Genres: Anison, rock
- Years active: 1981–1990
- Label: King Records
- Past members: Tomoaki Taka; Takumi Abe; Hiroyuki Tanaka; Shunji Inoe; Masato Wada; Shigeji Tamura

Neverland (ネバーランド, nebārando) was a Japanese rock band founded by former Lazy members Hiroyuki Tanaka and Shunji Inoe after the dissolution of Lazy. The band was active in the 1980s.

== Members ==
- Vocal: Tomoaki Taka
- Guitar: Takumi Abe
- Bass: Hiroyuki Tanaka
- Keyboard: Shunji Inoe
- Drums: Masato Wada (withdrew from the band in 1985), Shigeji Tamura (joined the band after Wada's departure)

== Anime theme songs ==
- "Lonely journey" (孤独の旅路~LONELY JOURNEY~, kodoku no tabiji Lonely Journey) - Opening theme of Psycho Armor Govarian.
- "Lullaby" (ララバイ, rarabai) - Ending theme of Psycho Armor Govarian.
- "It's LOVE" (It's LOVE ~それは愛~, It's LOVE ~sore wa ai~) - Insert song of Psycho Armor Govarian.
- "Yuhi no Omoi" (夕陽の想い, Yūhi no Omoi; translated as "Thought of the sunset") - Insert song of Psycho Armor Govarian.
- "Ginga Densetsu Odyssey" (銀河伝説オデッセイ, Ginga Densetsu Odissei; "Galactic Legend Odyssey") - Opening theme of Uchu Densetsu Ulysses 31.
- "Ai. Toki no Kanata ni" (愛･時の彼方に, Ai. Toki no Kanata ni; "Love, Over the other side of time") - Ending theme of Uchu Densetsu Ulysses 31.

== Discography ==
=== Singles ===
Title	Standard number	Release date
Ashita Shoku no Sneaker	K07S-293	May 21, 1982
Sphinx	K07S-336	October 21, 1982
24 Jikan Nemurase te	K07S-372	January 21, 1983
Psycho Armor Govarian - Lonely journey	K07S-3052	July 5, 1983
September Blues	K07S-467	October 5, 1983
Psycho Armor Govarian - It's LOVE	K07S-3063	October 1983
Manicure	K07S-622	October 21, 1984
Mannish Woman	K07S-10024	May 21, 1985
*Broken Heart ni Yakitsuke te	K07S-10077	December 21, 1985
*Ginga Densetsu Odyssey	K07S-10094	April 21, 1986
Shitagokoro Kofun Party		March 25, 1987
Dear my friends	H00P-40031	July 25, 1989

* These singles were promoted as Tomoaki Taka singles.

=== Albums ===
Title	Standard number	Release date
Ticket to island	K28A-270	August 21, 1982
Message from island		April 21, 1983
Welcome to our Neverland		July 21, 1983
Landing on island		December 21, 1983
Motion		June 21, 1984
Exciting mini		December 5, 1984
Inside touch		April 21, 1985
Jokigen Run Run Run		October 25, 1986
NEVERLANDing	28MX-1264	March 25, 1987
The last night	POCH-1005	April 25, 1990

=== Other ===
Title	Type	Release date
Starting over'84	Live-Video	April 21, 1984
Pro-Wrestling Super Fighters' theme	LP Album	December 5, 1984
Pro-Wrestling Super Fighters' theme - Special long version	Single	December 5, 1984
Waga na wa Okami (Wolf)	Graphic novel Waga na wa Okami image album	December 18, 1985
Dang Danga Presents Special CD	Promotional CD (not for sale)	1988
