= CB Chara Nagai Go World =

Direct-to-video anime and its (sub)franchise

- Vol. 2 (VHS)

CBキャラ永井豪ワールド (cb kyara nagai gō wārudo)
- Genre: Parody
- Original video animation
- Directed by: Umanosuke Iida
- Written by: Umanosuke Iida
- Music by: Kenji Kawai
- Studio: Triangle Staff
- Licensed by: NA: Discotek Media
- Released: February 21, 1991 – June 27, 1991
- Runtime: 45 minutes
- Episodes: 3
- Manga

CB Chara Nagai Go World Gekitotsu! Shin Shun Kakushi Geitai Kai
- Written by: Go Nagai
- Published by: Sankei Shinbunsha
- Magazine: Comic Sankei
- Published: January 1, 1992
- icon

CB Chara Nagai Go World (CBキャラ永井豪ワールド, CB kyara nagai gō wārudo; "Chibi Characters Go Nagai's World") is an original video animation based in the works of Go Nagai. It was originally released from February 21, 1991 to June 27, 1991 in three episodes. Following the same concept, a oneshot manga by Nagai was released in 1992.

The OVA was also released in Italy under the name Il pazzo mondo di Go Nagai.

== Plot ==
As Akira Fudo wakes up, he finds himself in a "chibi" form, which he thinks doesn't fit a hero such as himself. He is not the only one that has changed. Together with Ryo and Miki, they set out on a journey to restore their proper appearances and find out what caused this change. During their adventure they find several other characters from the world of Go Nagai, such as Mazinger Z, Dr. Hell, Baron Ashura, and others.

== Characters ==
=== Devilman ===
- Akira Fudo/Devilman (played by Shō Hayami)
- Ryo Asuka/Satan (Ryo played by Yū Mizushima, Satan played by Sakiko Tamagawa)
- Miki Makimura (played by Jun koyamaki)
- Jinmen (played by Takeshi Aono)
- Sirène (played by Yoshiko Sakakibara)
- Psycho Jenny
- Caim
- Agwel
- Gelmer

=== Mazinger Z ===
- Koji Kabuto (played by Kappei Yamaguchi)
- Sayaka Yumi (played by Ikue Ōtani)
- Baron Ashura (male part played by Kōichi Yamadera, female part played by Saeko Shimazu)
- Dr. Hell (played by Kōsei Tomita)
- Gamia Q3 (played by Megumi Hayashibara)
- Count Brocken
- Garada K7
- Belgas V5

=== Other series ===
- Grendizer
- Steel Jeeg
- Getter Robo
- Violence Jack (played by Unshō Ishizuka)

Several other characters from other series created by Nagai also appear in both the opening and ending of the episodes, although they do not have a role in the main story.

== Production ==
=== Staff ===
- Distributor: Bandai Visual
- Planning: Dynamic Planning
- Original work: Go Nagai
- Director/storyboards: Umanosuke Iida
- Animation director: Tsutomu Yabuki
- Character design/key animation director: Kazuo Komatsubara
- Art director: Yoshinari Kanehako
- Director of photography: Naoto Fujikura
- Sound director: Shigeru Chiba
- Music: Kenji Kawai
- Production: Dynamic Planning, Triangle Staff
- Executive producer: Bandai

=== Theme songs ===
- Opening: Ore ga kono Yo no Shujinkou (俺がこの世の主人公; I am the hero of this world). Lyrics by Kan-chan, composition by Kenji Kawai, song by Shinichi Ishihara.
- Ending: Pending Now! Lyrics by Kan-chan, composition by Kenji Kawai, song by Kyoko Hirotani.

== Media ==
=== Episodes ===
No.	Title	Standard number	Original release date
1	"I am the Demon, Devilman!" (Japanese: オレは悪魔だデビルマン!)	BES-541	February 21, 1991
2	"I am the Mighty Mazinger Z!" (Japanese: オレは強いぞマジンガーZ!)	BES-542	April 25, 1991
3	"This is the End, Violence Jack!" (Japanese: これが最後だバイオレンスジャック!)	BES-543	June 27, 1991

=== Home video ===
Besides the original VHS releases, all episodes were released in laserdisc also by Bandai.

#	Standard number	Release date
1	BEAL-377	March 21, 1991
2	BEAL-378	May 23, 1991
3	BEAL-379	July 25, 1991

In June 22, 2007 was released the CB Chara Nagai Go World Remaster Box by Bandai Visual (standard number BCBA-2916), a DVD box containing the episodes plus other extras.

=== Releases outside Japan ===
The OVA was released in Italy in VHS format by Dynamic Italia in 2000, and on 3 DVD by Yamato Video in 2013. Discotek Media licensed the series for North America and released a complete Region A Blu-Ray on September 26th, 2023.

=== Photobooks ===
As part of the collection Keibunsha no daihyakka (ケイブンシャの大百科), published by Keibunsha, three photobooks based on the three episodes were released in 1991.

== Manga ==
An oneshot manga titled CB Chara Nagai Go World Gekitotsu! Shin Shun Kakushi Geitai Kai (CBキャラ永井豪ワールド激突!新春かくし芸大会, cb kyara nagai gō wārudo gekitotsu! shinshun kakushi geitaikai) was released on January 1, 1992 in the magazine Comic Sankei, published by Sankei Shinbunsha.
