= Psycho Armor Govarian =

Japanese anime television series

- Front cover of the EP Psycho Armor Govarian – Lonely Journey, King Records 1983

サイコアーマー ゴーバリアン (Saiko Āmā Gōbarian)
- Genre: Mecha
- Created by: Go Nagai
- Anime television series
- Directed by: Seiji Okuda
- Written by: Yoshihisa Araki
- Music by: Tatsumi Yano
- Studio: Knack Productions
- Licensed by: NA: Discotek Media
- Original network: MegaTON (TV Tokyo)
- Original run: July 6, 1983 – December 28, 1983
- Episodes: 26
- Manga
- Written by: Go Nagai
- Illustrated by: Tatsuo Yasuda
- Published by: Shogakukan
- Magazine: Yoiko
- Original run: August 1983 – February 1984

Psycho Armor Govarian (サイコアーマー ゴーバリアン, Saiko Āmā Gōbarian; also romanized as Psycho Armor Gobarian and Psychoarmor Govarian) is a Japanese anime television series created by Go Nagai. It was produced by Knack Productions and TV Tokyo. The series was originally broadcast from July 6, 1983 to December 28, 1983 in Japan. Besides Japan, it was also broadcast in South Korea in 1988 by MBC where it was known as 사이코아머 고바리안 or 싸이코 아머 고바리안. It is also known as 海王星戰士 in Taiwan and 超能裝甲哥巴里安 in Hong Kong. The anime is considered a mix of Genma Taisen, Mazinger and Gundam.

== Premise ==
The Garadain Empire has exhausted the primary resources of their native planet, so they send different space expeditions to find a new world where to live. One of their main objectives is planet Earth. However, Zeku Alba, an alien scientist, decides to rebel against the imperial rule and flees towards the Earth, where he gathers a group of children gifted with the power of "psychogenesis", an ability that consists of creating solid matter from psychic energy.

The most gifted of the squadron is Isamu, a young orphan whose family was killed in the first attack of the Garadain Empire. He is able to generate the powerful robot Govarian, an armor with which he can battle the alien monsters and is able to regenerate thanks to the psychic energy of the pilot. Helped by two other robots created by his teammates, Isamu, aboard the robot Govarian, defends the Earth in the long war against the alien invaders.

== Episodes ==
No.	Title	Directed by	Written by	Original release date
1	"Warrior Born In Flames" "honō no naka senshi tanjō" (炎の中戦士誕生)	Directed by : Seiji Okuda; Storyboarded by : Satoru Kumazaki	Yoshihisa Araki	July 6, 1983
2	"Psychic Power Warrior First File" "chōnōryoku senshi fāsuto fairu" (超能力戦士ファーストファイル)	Directed by : Kazuya Miyazaki; Storyboarded by : Satoru Kumazaki	Yoshihisa Araki	July 13, 1983
3	"Warrior Woman Meria's Passionate Hatred" "josenshi meria no atsui nikushimi" (女戦士メリアの熱い憎しみ)	Directed by : Hiroshi Yoshida; Storyboarded by : Satoru Kumazaki	Yoshihisa Araki	July 20, 1983
4	"Battleground Merry-go-round" "senjō no kaiten mokuba" (戦場の回転木馬)	Kazuya Miyazaki	Hideki Sonoda	July 27, 1983
5	"Mischievous Twins Melody" "wanpaku sōko no merodī" (わんぱく双児のメロディー)	Tatsuya Kasahara	Katsuhiko Taguchi; Yoshihisa Araki	August 3, 1983
6	"Rampaging Space Rider" "uchū no bōsō raidā" (宇宙の暴走ライダー)	Makoto Nagao	Yuji Watanabe	August 10, 1983
7	"Our Battle" "ore tachi no tatakai" (俺たちの戦い)	Yasuo Ishikawa	Yoshihisa Araki	August 17, 1983
8	"Buster, Vanished with the Rainbow" "niji ni kie ta basutā" (虹に消えたバスター)	Kazuya Miyazaki	Hideki Sonoda	August 24, 1983
9	"Loving and Hating Family" "ai to nikushimi no famirī" (愛と憎しみのファミリー)	Directed by : Yuji Asada; Storyboarded by : Satoru Kumazaki	Katsuhiko Taguchi	August 31, 1983
10	"The Springtime of Atlas's Youth" "atorasu no seishun" (アトラスの青春)	Directed by : Yoshinori Nakamura; Storyboarded by : Makoto Nagao	Yuji Watanabe	September 7, 1983
11	"Front Line in Hyperspace" "akūkan saizensen" (亜空間最前線)	Tatsuya Kasahara	Hideki Sonoda	September 14, 1983
12	"Pursuit of Domson's Army" "tsuigeki domuson gundan" (追撃·ドムソン軍団)	Directed by : Hiroshi Negishi; Storyboarded by : Makoto Nagao	Yuji Watanabe	September 21, 1983
13	"Fierce Battle at the Space Colony" "gekisen supēsu koronī" (激戦·スペースコロニー)	Directed by : Isao Harada; Storyboarded by : Mitsukazu Yamatani	Yoshihisa Araki	September 28, 1983
14	"Demondos Blows Up" "gaika demondosu dai bakuhatsu" (凱歌·デモンドス大爆発)	Directed by : Kazuya Miyazaki; Storyboarded by : Satoru Kumazaki	Sayumi Mizunaga	October 5, 1983
15	"Garadain's Palace in the Mysterious Dimension" "you jigen garadain shiro" (妖次元·ガラダイン城)	Directed by : Takao Motohashi; Storyboarded by : Kiyomu Fukuda	Hideki Sonoda	October 12, 1983
16	"Escape! Love Left Behind" "dasshutsu! nokosa reta ai" (脱出!残された愛)	Toshio Kinoshita	Hideki Sonoda	October 19, 1983
17	"Giant Fortress Daingaram" "kyodai yousai daingarāmu" (巨大要塞ダインガラーム)	Yasuo Ishikawa	Yuji Watanabe	October 26, 1983
18	"Beyond the Battlefield" "aika senjō no kanata" (哀歌·戦場のかなた)	Kazuya Miyazaki	Yoshihisa Araki	November 2, 1983
19	"Hellfire on the Moon" "tsuki jigoku no honō" (月·地獄の炎)	Directed by : Kazuya Miyazaki; Storyboarded by : Hiroshi Negishi	Masato Nishio	November 9, 1983
20	"Dark Death Match" "ankoku desu macchi" (暗黒デス·マッチ)	Kazuyuki Okasako	Yoshihisa Araki	November 16, 1983
21	"Explosion on the Moon's Surface/Daingaram" "getsumen bakuha daingarāmu" (月面爆破·ダインガラーム)	Directed by : Kazuya Miyazaki; Storyboarded by : Satoru Kumazaki	Tsukasa Takahashi	November 23, 1983
22	"The Ghost Fortress, Glonn Deathroam" "yōma no toride guron desurōmu" (妖魔の砦グロン·デスローム)	Directed by : Takao Motohashi; Storyboarded by : Satoru Kumazaki	Hideki Sonoda	November 30, 1983
23	"Dimensional Invasion Fort" "jigen shinryaku yōsai" (次元侵略要塞)	Makoto Nagao	Yuji Watanabe	December 7, 1983
24	"Mortal Combat South Pole Blizzard" "shitō kyokuten no burizādo" (死闘極点のブリザード)	Directed by : Kazuya Miyazaki; Storyboarded by : Kazuyuki Okasako	Hideki Sonoda	December 14, 1983
25	"The Final Operation Begins/Meria Versus Christo" "saishū sakusen kaishi meria tai kurisuto" (最終作戦開始-メリア対クリスト-)	Yasuo Ishikawa	Yoshihisa Araki	December 21, 1983
26	"Annihilation? Earth's Dimensional Teleportation" "kaimetsu? chikyū jigen idō" (壊滅?地球次元移動)	Directed by : Ryo Mizushiro; Storyboarded by : Satoru Kumazaki	Yoshihisa Araki	December 28, 1983

== Production ==
The head of the main mecha of the series, Govarian, is similar to the head of Mazinger Z and Great Mazinger. This was done on purpose by Go Nagai and Dynamic Planning in accordance with the demand of production company Knack. In South Korea, it was presented as being part of the Mazinger series along with Groizer X. Other than that, Psycho Armor Govarian has no real relationship to any of the Mazinger series.

=== Staff ===
- Airtime: Wednesday, 19:30-20:00 hrs.
- Network: TV Tokyo
- Production: TV Tokyo, Knack
- Original work: Go Nagai, Dynamic Planning
- Planning: Seiichi Nishino (Knack)
- Producer: Hyota Ezu (TV Tokyo), Hirofumi Toida (Knack)
- Series organization: Yoshihisa Araki
- Series director: Seiji Okuda
- Animation director: Gen Fukuda, Yuki Kinoshita
- Script: Hideki Sonoda, Katsuhiko Taguchi, Yuji Watanabe, Tomomi Minahaya, Masato Nishio, Tsukasa Takahashi
- Original character: Go Nagai
- Character design: Gen Fukuda
- Mechanic design: Sawaki Tateba
- Art director: Morishige Suzuki
- Photography director: Yoichi Shimizu
- Music: Tatsumi Yano
- Theme song performance: Neverland

=== Theme songs ===
- Opening theme: "Lonely journey" (孤独の旅路~LONELY JOURNEY~, kodoku no tabiji Lonely Journey), lyrics by Tomoaki Taka, composition by Shunji Inoe, arrangement by Neverland & Hiroki Harada (chorus), song by Tomoaki Taka.
- Ending theme: "Lullaby" (ララバイ, rarabai), lyrics by Tomoaki Taka, composition by Shunji Inoe, arrangement by Neverland, song by Tomoaki Taka.
- Insert song: "It's LOVE" (It's LOVE ~それは愛~, It's LOVE ~sore wa ai~), lyrics by Tomoaki Taka, composition by Shunji Inoe, arrangement by Tatsumi Yano, song by Tomoaki Taka. This theme is used in the last episode.
- Insert song: "Yuhi no Omoi" (夕陽の想い, Yūhi no Omoi; translated as "Thought of the sunset"), lyrics by Tomoaki Taka, composition by Shunji Inoe, arrangement by Tatsumi Yano, song by Tomoaki Taka.

"Lonely Journey" and "Lullaby" have been used in several music collections in arranged versions sung by Hironobu Kageyama.

== Media ==
=== Home video ===
The series was released in VHS format during the 1980s in 6 volumes by RCA Columbia Pictures Home Video Japan. In 2006-03-25 a DVD-box set containing the whole series was released by the company Japanese company BM3 with the standard number OHK-27. During Otakon 2018 on August 12, Discotek Media announced a 1-disc SD on BD release of the entire series for a future release.

=== Picture books and manga ===
Besides the main TV series, two series of picture books were released, one by Shogakukan and the other by Asahi Sonorama. Also a short manga serialization, with the art of Tatsuo Yasuda (another pen name of Tatsuya Yasuda), was published in the children's manga magazine Yoiko published by Shogakukan from August 1983 to February 1984.

=== Toys ===
Some toys and action figures based in the robots of the series were released, including several South Korean bootleg versions. The official figures were made by the company Poem.

=== Soundtracks ===
Four vinyl records were released during 1983 by King Records. The first one, an EP called Psycho Armor Govarian – Lonely Journey, contains the opening and ending theme, both of them performed by the Japanese group Neverland. The second EP, called Psycho Armor Govarian – It's LOVE, contains the themes "It's LOVE" and "Yuhi no Omoi". Also performed by Neverland, both themes have lyrics by Tomoaki Taka, composition by Shunji Inoe, arrangement by Tatsumi Yano and are sung by Tomoaki Taka. The last two are full LP album containing the BGM of the series and the opening and ending themes.

Title	Type	Artist	Standard number	Release date
Psycho Armor Govarian – Lonely journey	EP record	Neverland	K07S-3052	July 1983
Psycho Armor Govarian BGM Vol.1	LP album	Tatsumi Yano	K22G-7144	September 1983
Psycho Armor Govarian – It's LOVE	EP record	Neverland	K07S-3063	October 1983
Psycho Armor Govarian BGM Vol.2	LP album	Tatsumi Yano	K22G-7173	December 1983

The opening and ending songs of the series are included in several CD compilations of anime series.

Title	Label	Standard number	Release date
Nagai Go Hero Densetsu: Kotetsu Majin Hen	First Smile Entertainment	FSCA-10204	January 17, 2002
Nagai Go Hero Densetsu: Kijin Sugosen Hen	First Smile Entertainment	FSCA-10210	February 20, 2002
Super Robot Tamashii The Best Vol.1: Super Robot Hen	Be! Smile	BSCH-30001/2	October 22, 2003
Super Robot Tamashii The Best Vol.2: Super Robot Hen 2	Be! Smile	BSCH-30003/4	November 19, 2003
Getter Densetsu + 10: The Legends of GETTER	Be! Smile	BSCH-30013	March 10, 2004
Kageyama Hironobu Best & Live	Be! Smile	BSCH-30014	April 7, 2004
Super Robot Tamashii The Instrumental: Super Robot & Real Robot Hen Vol.1	Be! Smile	BSCH-30030	December 1, 2004
Super Robot Spirits Shudaika Best Collection	Be! Smile	BSCH-30037	July 6, 2005
Nagai Go Dynamic!! The chronicle	Be! Smile	BSCH-30040	December 21, 2005
The Best!! Super Robot Spirits: Super Robot Studio Recordings	Be! Smile	BSCH-30063/6	July 11, 2007
Super Robot Spirits: Non stop mix Vol.3	Be! Smile	BSCH-30086	July 9, 2008
The Best!! Super Robot Spirits: The Best Karaoke songs	Be! Smile	BSCH-30094/7	December 10, 2008

=== Appearances in other media ===
Besides its series related media, Govarian has appeared in other media. The most prominent is its appearance in the Dynamic Super Robots Soshingeki!! (ダイナミックスーパーロボット総進撃!!, dainamikku sūpā robotto sōshingeki) clips that were included at the end of the DVDs of Shin Getter Robot tai Neo Getter Robot. Govarian appears alongside Great Mazinger, Venus A, Getter Robot G, Kotetsu Jeeg, God Mazinger and Groizer X to rescue Mazinger Z and Aphrodite A, but are defeated and in turn saved by Shin Getter Robot and Grendizer just before the arrival of Mazinkaiser.
