= Dynamic Heroes =

Japanese manga series

- Dynamic Heroes #1 released by Kodansha

ダイナミックヒーローズ (Dainamikku Hīrōzu)
- Genre: Action, Mecha, Sci-fi
- Manga
- Written by: Go Nagai, Kazuhiro Ochi
- Illustrated by: Kazuhiro Ochi
- Published by: Kodansha
- Magazine: e-manga
- Original run: 2004-06 – 2007-07
- Volumes: 4

Dynamic Heroes (Japanese: ダイナミックヒーローズ, Hepburn: Dainamikku Hīrōzu), also known as Nagai Go Manga Gaiden - Dynamic Heroes (永井豪まんが外伝 ダイナミックヒーローズ, Nagai Gō Manga Gaiden Dainamikku Hīrōzu) and as Go Nagai manga heroes crossover collection - Dynamic Heroes, is a Japanese manga based in several works of Go Nagai, including most of his most famous robots, such as Mazinger Z, Getter Robot, Great Mazinger and UFO Robot Grendizer, and also several characters from other series such as Cutie Honey and Devilman. The artist of the manga is Kazuhiro Ochi and the design of the characters is based mostly in their anime incarnations.

It was originally published in monthly manga magazine e-manga from Kodansha, from June 2004 to July 2007. It has been later compiled in tankōbon, though the Japanese tankōbon have yet to be finished and fully print the series. It was also published in its entirety by d/visual in Italy and in Hong Kong and Taiwan by d/visual taipei, both versions covering all the original chapters, thus surpassing the Japanese tankōbon. A French edition has also been planned and printed by d/visual and was ready to be launched at the Japan Expo 2008 in Paris, but due to an unknown situation, as of December 2008, the series has not been released for sale yet, even though two of the four volumes were already printed and have an ISBN.

== Characters ==
- Koji Kabuto — Originally the pilot of Mazinger Z, went on to create the first man-made UFO, called "TFO".
- Duke Fried — Pilot of UFO Robo Grendizer, went by the alias Daisuke Umon. Returned to his home planet after his victory over Emperor Vega.
- Grace Maria Fried — Duke's little sister, who returned with him to Planet Fried. She is in love with Koji.
- Hikaru Makiba — Love interest to Duke. Lives on a ranch with her father and brother.
- Sayaka Yumi— Daughter of Prof. Yumi and pilot of Dianan A. Koji's love interest.
- Boss — Koji's longtime friend who pilots Boss Borot. He is usually accompanied by his friends Nuke and Mucha.
- Akira Fudo — Was originally the bravest warrior of the Demon Tribe known as Devilman. He has betrayed the tribe and made them his enemy.
- Lala — A beautiful but dim-witted demon who fell in love with Devilman. Originally killed by Demon Magdler, she is revived with the other female demons.
- Honey Kisaragi — A super android known as Cutie Honey, equipped with the Atmospheric Element Condenser. She battles against Panther Claw.
- Tetsuya Tsurugi — Pilot of Great Mazinger.
- Jun Hono — Pilot of Venus A. She is also Tetsuya's girlfriend.

== Villains ==
- Dr. Hell — Was originally killed by Koji Kabuto, but is back for revenge. He aims to steal Honey's Atmospheric Element Condenser.
- Sister Jill — The manager of Panther Claw's Japanese Branch, younger sister to Panther Zora. Originally killed by Honey, she is revived along with the female members of the Demon Tribe.
- Panther Zora — Leader of Panther Claw. Teams up with Dr. Hell and uses her power to revive Jill and the female members of the Demon Tribe. She is currently in recovery.
