= Nagai Go World: Maboroshi Panty VS Henchin Pokoider =

2004 film by Minoru Kawasaki

- Cover of the Japanese DVD release of the film.
- Directed by: Minoru Kawasaki
- Written by: Masakazu Migita; Minoru Kawasaki; Go Nagai (original characters)
- Produced by: Hiroyuki Yamada; Masaaki Ide
- Starring: Miki Komori; Yakan Nabe; Maiko Kazeno; Emi Kitagawa; Ai Mitsuba; Yuriko Sakuma; Reipar Sato; Yasuhiro Koshi; Kabakitsutomu; Daisuke Sasagawa; Kunio Masaoka; Eiichi Kikuchi; Isamu Ago; Go Nagai
- Cinematography: Yasutaka Nagano
- Music by: Shuichi Ishikawa; Masako Ishii
- Distributed by: TMC
- Release date: May 10, 2004
- Running time: 70 minutes
- Country: Japan
- Language: Japanese

Nagai Go World: Maboroshi Panty VS Henchin Pokoider (永井豪ワールド まぼろしパンティVSへんちんポコイダー, nagai gou wa^rudo maboroshi pantei vs henchin pokoida^) is a Japanese tokusatsu erotic-comedy film based in some works of Go Nagai. Directed by Minoru Kawasaki, it was produced and distributed by Total Media Corporation (TMC), and released in 2004. The movie draws several elements from many works of Nagai, most prominently the characters Maboroshi Panty and Henchin Pokoider, but some others are also featured in the film such as Satan no Ashi no Tsume from Kekko Kamen.
