= Nagai Go no Kowai Zone 2: Senki =

- VHS c
- Directed by: Go Nagai; Hikari Hayakawa
- Written by: Go Nagai; Hikari Hayakawa
- Starring: Mitsuteru Hori; Chiharu Aoyama; Tetsuji Endo; Hideyo Amamoto; Ippongi Bang; Kanako Narikiyo; Yuichi Komine
- Cinematography: Satoshi Murakawa
- Music by: Kenji Kawai
- Distributed by: Bandai Media
- Release date: August 24, 1990
- Running time: 50 minutes
- Country: Japan
- Language: Japanese

Nagai Go no Kowai Zone 2: Senki (永井豪のこわいゾーン2 戦鬼, nagai gou no kowai zo^n 2 sen ki; translated as Go Nagai's Scary Zone 2: Battling Demon) is a Japanese direct-to-video horror film released in 1990 by the Bandai Media Division (now Bandai Visual). It's the sequel of the film Nagai Go no Kowai Zone: Kaiki and just like the first film, it was also directed Go Nagai and Hikari Hayakawa. This is one of several films where Japanese manga artist Ippongi Bang plays a role.
