= Shutendoji (manga) =

Japanese manga and anime series

- Legend of Shutendoji
- Cover of volume 1 of Legend of Shutendoji by Fusosha, art by Akemi Takada (1998)

手天童子 (Shutendōji)
- Manga
- Written by: Go Nagai
- Published by: Kodansha
- Magazine: Weekly Shōnen Magazine
- Original run: September 5, 1976 – April 30, 1978
- Volumes: 9
- Novel series
- Written by: Yasutaka Nagai
- Illustrated by: Go Nagai
- Published by: Kadokawa Shoten
- Imprint: Kadokawa Novels
- Original run: July 1986 – June 1989
- Volumes: 6
- Novel series
- Written by: Shigekazu Kitamura
- Published by: JICC
- Imprint: Adventure Novels
- Original run: October 1987 – December 1987
- Volumes: 2
- Original video animation
- Directed by: Junji Nishimura (1-2); Jun Kawagoe (3); Masatomo Sudo (4)
- Written by: Masashi Sogo
- Music by: Fumitaka Anzai
- Studio: Studio Signal
- Licensed by: NA: ADV Films
- Released: December 21, 1989 – December 21, 1991
- Runtime: 50 minutes (each)
- Episodes: 4
- Video game
- Publisher: Enix
- Genre: RPG
- Platform: NEC PC-9801
- Released: October 1990
- Manga

The Legendary Demon Slayer Shutendoji
- Written by: Go Nagai
- Illustrated by: Masato Natsumoto
- Published by: Akita Shoten
- Magazine: Champion Red
- Original run: October 2002 – December 2005
- Volumes: 7

Shutendoji (Japanese: 手天童子, Hepburn: Shutendōji), also known as Legend of Shutendoji, is a Japanese manga series created by Go Nagai which combines elements from Japanese folklore with science fiction. An OVA series was released beginning in 1989 and ending in 1991, for a total of 4 episodes.

In 2002, a remake/sequel titled The Legendary Demon Slayer Shutendoji (降魔伝 手天童子, Gōmaden Shutendōji) started being published in the magazine Champion Red, being one of the series that were released in the first issue of the magazine.

== Plot ==
Artist and writer Ryuichiro Shiba and his wife, Kyoko, are visiting a temple to make a promise of marriage to their ancestors. At that moment, however, two oni appear before them and fight to death; one of them carrying a baby on his mouth. After defeating his opponent, the oni gives Ryuichiro and Kyoko the baby and declares that he will return for him after 15 years. After said period of time, strange events start happening around the baby, now a teenager named Jiro Shutendo.

== Characters ==
=== Main characters ===
Jiro Shutendo (手天童子郎, shutendou jirō)
Voiced by: Ryo Horikawa

The fifteen-year-old protagonist of the story, he is an oni.

Miyuki Shiratori (白鳥美雪, shiratori miyuki)
Voiced by: Sumi Shimamoto

Jiro's schoolmate and love interest. She becomes infatuated with him after he rescues her and a schoolmate from some bullies. In terms of characterisation, she fits both the ingenue and damsel in distress archetypes, given that, throughout the narrative, she often ends up naked and captured at the hands of the manga's antagonists.

Ryuichiro Shiba (柴竜一郎, shiba ryūichirō)
Voiced by: Michihiro Ikemizu

Jiro's adoptive human father.

Kyoko Shiba (柴京子, shiba kyōko)
Voiced by: Sanae Takagi

Jiro's adoptive human mother.

Goki (護鬼, goki)
Voiced by: Tessho Genda

One of the two oni created to protect Jiro. He looks relatively humanoid, unlike most oni, and acts as a mentor for Jiro.

Senki (戦鬼, senki)
Voiced by: Daisuke Gori

One of the two oni created to protect Jiro. He brought him as a baby to his parents.

=== Allies ===
Yusuke Shiratori (白鳥勇輔, shiratori yūsuke)

Miyuki's older brother and Jiro's first and best friend.

Naojiro Oyama (大山 直次郎, oyama naojiro)

A friend of Yusuke who is a descendant of ancient oni. He's the heir of a yakuza family trained through generations to protect Jiro.

Riki Muso (無双 力, muso riki)

A human descendant of ancient oni and another friend to Yusuke. She is a strong female oni who hides under the guise of a rowdy, masculine-looking girl with a love for professional wrestling. Her nickname is "Ricki".

Kosaku Kaji (梶 工作, kaji kosaku)

Another descendant of an oni, a timid, bookish boy with psychic abilities.

Yashi Koya (小谷 椰子夫, koya yashi)

Another descendant of an oni and the last member of Yusuke's gang. He is a plump boy with superhuman strength that practises sumo wrestling. He's nicknamed "Koyatashi".

=== Enemies ===
Yonen Majari (魔邪利 妖念, majari yonen)

The high priest of Ankoku Jashin Kyo ("School of the Evil God from Darkness"), an evil cult who worships demons. His goal is killing Jiro.

Kukai Jawanbo (邪腕坊 苦海, jawanbo kukai)

Majari's lieutenant, a powerful priest who wields a double kusarigama.

Iron Kaiser (アイアンカイザー, aion kaisa)
Voiced by: Akio Ohtsuka

Kukai's son, who grew and became a military cyborg in order to avenge his father.

== Original manga publication ==
=== Prototype ===
Before starting serialization, Nagai created a 57-page oneshot titled Shutendoji, published in the issue of February 1975 in the Shōjo magazine Princess, published by Akita Shoten. While this manga has some similarities, it is a completely different story, as well as being a Shōjo manga instead of Shōnen. It would later be renamed as Jashin Senki (邪神戦記) or Princess Han Shutendoji (プリンセス版手天童子).

=== Original serialization ===
Shutendoji started being published as a serialized series from September 5, 1976, to April 30, 1978, in the magazine Weekly Shōnen Magazine by Kodansha.

The manga was originally compiled in 9 volumes, and would later be re-published several times.

- Kodansha (KC Magazine, 1977–1978)

Japanese release date	Vol.
April 5, 1977	1
May 10, 1977	2
July 20, 1977	3
August 20, 1977	4
March 25, 1978	5
June 25, 1978	6
July 25, 1978	7
September 20, 1978	8
November 25, 1978	9

- Kodansha (KC Special, 1985)

Japanese release date	Vol.	ISBN
August 6, 1985	1	4061011529
August 6, 1985	2	4061011537
September 6, 1985	3	4061011545
October 5, 1985	4	4061011553
November 6, 1985	5	4061011561

- Kodansha (Goka Aizoban, 1988–1989)

Japanese release date	Vol.	ISBN
September 17, 1988	1	4061769081
September 17, 1988	2	406176909X
October 17, 1988	3	4061769111
November 17, 1988	4	406176912X
December 17, 1988	5	4061769138
January 17, 1989	6	4061769146

- Fusosha (Fusosha Bunko, 1996–1997)

Japanese release date	Vol.	ISBN
August 30, 1996	1	4594020534
September 30, 1996	2	4594020755
October 30, 1996	3	4594021042
November 30, 1996	4	4594021204
December 30, 1996	5	4594021476
January 30, 1997	6	4594021719

- Fusosha (Legend of Shutendoji, 1998)

Japanese release date	Vol.	ISBN
April 1, 1998	1	4594024580
April 1, 1998	2	4594024599
May 10, 1998	3	4594024696
June 10, 1998	4	459402470X
July 10, 1998	5	4594025064
August 10, 1998	6	4594025072

- Kodansha (Kodansha Manga Bunko, 2001)

Japanese release date	Vol.	ISBN
October 12, 2001	1	4063600971
October 12, 2001	2	406360098X
November 12, 2001	3	4063600998
November 12, 2001	4	4063601005

Besides the printed volumes, the manga has also been published in 10 ebook format volumes by ebookjapan. The series has also been published in some compilations of other Nagai's manga.

==== Publications outside Japan ====
d/visual published the full series in Italy from 2004 to 2005.

Italian release date	Vol.	ISBN
July 23, 2004	1	4902751046
October 15, 2004	2	4902751097
December 17, 2004	3	4902751151
February 18, 2005	4	4902751399
April 15, 2005	5	4902751402
April 29, 2005	6	4902751410
June 30, 2005	7	4902751429
September 2, 2005	8	4902751437
October 26, 2005	9	4902751445

== Novels ==
Two series of novels based on the manga were released during the 1980s. The first one was written by Yasutaka Nagai and was released in 6 volumes from 1986 to 1989 by Kadokawa Shoten.

- Kadokawa Shoten (Kadokawa Novels)

Release date	Vol.	Subtitle	Pages	ISBN
July 1986	1	Oni no Kechimyaku (鬼の血脈)	218	4047740217
March 1988	2	Oni Tenshi (鬼天使)	204	4047740225
June 1988	3	Jakyo no Wana (邪教の罠, jakyō no wana)	188	4047740233
October 1988	4	Ankoku tera no Shito (暗黒寺の死闘, ankoku tera no shitō)	194	4047740241
February 1989	5	Samayo Eru Oni Tachi (彷徨える鬼たち)	198	404774025X
June 1989	6	Saraba Itoshiki Oni Tachi (さらば愛しき鬼たち)	201	4047740268

The second one was written by Fusamichi Kitamura and published in two volumes published in 1987 by JICC under the label Adventure Novels.

- JICC (Adventure Novels)

Release date	Vol.	Pages	ISBN
October 1987	1	282	4880633062
December 1987	2	250	4880633070

== OVAs ==
The manga was adapted into 4 OVAs released from 1989 to 1991. The OVAs were originally released on VHS and later on laserdisc, both times by Nippon Columbia.

No.	Title	Length	Directed by	Original release date
1	"Chapter of Hyoki" "hyōki no shō" (憑鬼の章)	47 minutes	Junji Nishimura	December 21, 1989
2	"Chapter of Goma" "gōma no shō" (降魔の章)	46 minutes	Junji Nishimura	July 1, 1990
3	"Chapter of Tekki" "tekki no shō" (鉄鬼の章)	49 minutes	Jun Kawagoe	March 1, 1991
4	"Chapter of Ongoku" "ongoku no shō" (鬼獄の章)	54 minutes	Masatomo Sudo	March 1, 1991

They were re-released in DVD format also by Columbia in 2001.

=== Releases outside Japan ===
The OVAs were released in the US by ADV Films in VHS (4 tapes) and later on DVD (2 discs).

They were also released in Italy by Dynamic on VHS and in Latin America on TV by Locomotion.

=== Staff and production notes ===
- Distributor: Nippon Columbia
- Original work / organization: Go Nagai
- Planning work: Dynamic Planning
- Director: Junji Nishimura (1, 2), Jun Kawagoe (3), Masatomo Sudo (4)
- Scenario: Masashi Sogo
- Work supervision: Hideyuki Motohashi (1, 2)
- Animation supervisor: Satoshi Hirayama (3, 4), Masatomo Sudo (4)
- Character design: Satoshi Hirayama (3, 4)
- Mecha design: Masahiko Okura (3, 4)
- Art director: Masazumi Matsumiya (1, 2), Masuo Nakayama (3, 4)
- Director of photography: Tadashi Hosono (1, 2, 3), Akihiko Takahashi (4)
- Sound director: Akira Yamazaki
- Music: Fumitaka Anzai
- Animation work: Studio Signal
- Production: Nippon Animation
- Cast: Ryo Horikawa (Jiro Shutendo), Sumi Shimamoto (Miyuki Shiratori), Michihiro Ikemizu (Ryuichiro Shiba), Sanae Takagi (Kyoko Shiba), Rei Sakuma (Tanemura), Hiroya Ishimaru (Kitani), Tessho Genda (Goki), Daisuke Gori (Senki), Osamu Kobayashi (Yonen Majari), Shigeru Sakahara (Yusuke), Yoko Matsuoka (Rickey), Kiyoyuki Yanada (Naojiro), Kiyoshi Kawakubo (Oyama), Akio Otsuka (Iron Kaiser), Rihoko Yoshida (Captain Persis), Ryusei Nakao (Major Gill), Sakiko Tamagawa (Sonia), Chikao Otsuka (Oniryu), Koji Yada (Ishi)

== Video game ==
Along with the OVAs, a Role-playing game for the NEC PC-9801 was released by the Japanese company Enix in October 1990.

== The Legendary Demon Slayer Shutendoji ==
The Legendary Demon Slayer Shutendoji (降魔伝 手天童子, Gōmaden Shutendōji) is a manga created by Go Nagai and Masato Natsumoto, which was originally published from August 19, 2002 (cover date October 2002,) to October 19, 2005 (cover date December 2005), in Akita Shoten's shōnen manga magazine Champion Red. While it has a similar setting, the story is different from the original series.

No.	Release date	ISBN
1	April 17, 2003	978-4-253-23063-6
2	September 25, 2003	978-4-253-23064-3
3	April 15, 2004	978-4-253-23065-0
4	September 22, 2004	978-4-253-23066-7
5	February 19, 2005	978-4-253-23067-4
6	August 20, 2005	978-4-253-23068-1
7	December 20, 2005	978-4-253-23069-8
