= Nagai Go no Kowai Zone: Kaiki =

- VHS cover art
- Directed by: Go Nagai; Hikari Hayakawa
- Written by: Kenji Haga; Go Nagai
- Produced by: Satoru Ogura
- Starring: Yukari Tachibana; Eiji Kakigi; Akane Toyama; Yoichi Komatsuzaki; Chiaki Kawamata; Ken Ishikawa; Haruka Takachiho; Shintaro Ko; Shinobu Kaze
- Cinematography: Kazuhiko Sonoki
- Music by: Sakae Sakakibara
- Distributed by: Bandai Media
- Release date: August 25, 1989
- Running time: 45 minutes
- Country: Japan
- Language: Japanese

Nagai Go no Kowai Zone: Kaiki (永井豪のこわいゾーン 怪鬼, nagai gou no kowai zo^n kai ki; translated as Go Nagai's Scary Zone: Mysterious Demon) is a Japanese direct-to-video horror film released in 1989 by the Bandai Media Division (now Bandai Visual). It was the first film co-directed by Go Nagai along with Hikari Hayakawa. It features special appearances of other manga artists such as Chiaki Kawamata. The film has a sequel called Nagai Go no Kowai Zone 2: Senki.
