= Kyuketsu Onsen e Yokoso =

- One of the two covers of the VHS release of the film.
- Directed by: Hitoshi Matsuyama
- Written by: Go Nagai (original); Hikari Hayakawa
- Produced by: Jugo Minami; Hitoshi Yokohama; Seiichi Ono
- Starring: Yuka Onishi; Yoichi Yamamoto; Takashi Fujiki; Aya Sugimoto; Isao Takeno; Kyoko Ono; Keiko Awaji; Ryo Hitomi; Masahiro Sato; Ryuji Murakami
- Cinematography: Yosuke Mamiya
- Music by: Ryuji Murayama
- Distributed by: Museum
- Release date: 21 April 1997
- Running time: 82 minutes
- Country: Japan
- Language: Japanese

Kyuketsu Onsen e Yokoso (吸血温泉へようこそ, kyuuketsu onsen e youkoso; translated as Welcome to the blood-sucking hot spring) alternatively known as Kyuketsu Onsen ni Yokoso (吸血温泉にようこそ, kyuuketsu onsen ni youkoso) is a Japanese direct-to-video erotic horror film released in 1997 by the Japanese studio known as Museum. It is based in an original story by Go Nagai. A little after the release of the film, a manga version was also released in the magazine Comic Bazooka by Tatsumishuppan, from May 1997 to August 1997, and later released in a single tankōbon in 1997-10-25 by Mediax in the line MD Comics. The manga was later published in the compilation tankōbon Kireta Ito: Nagai Go Jisen Sakuhin shu published by Kadokawa Shoten in 2001.

The film features famous Japanese celebrity Aya Sugimoto in the role of the landlady of the onsen and the main vampire woman, ex-idol singer Yuka Onishi of Sukeban Deka III fame, and AV idol Ryo Hitomi.
