= Battle Hawk =

- Cover of the first DVD volume of Battle Hawk, from the DVD-Box distributed in Japan by the company Only Hearts.
- Genre: Tokusatsu, Action
- Created by: Go Nagai; Ken Ishikawa
- Written by: Yasutaka Nagai; Masaki Tsuji; Tsunehisa Ito; Susumu Yoshida; Hiroyuki Koromohi; Shu Komoro
- Directed by: Takeshi Yamada; Takashi Nagano; Keinosuke Tsuchiya; Yonosuke Koike
- Starring: Kazuya Tokimoto; Shinsuke Horie; Mimi Fukada; Ryohei Uchida; Yutaka Ichimitsu; Eiichi Kikuchi
- Voices of: Minoru Midorikawa
- Narrated by: Michihiro Ikemizu
- Theme music composer: Akihiro Komori
- Opening theme: Okore Yusha yo Battle Hawk
- Ending theme: Seigi no Toshi Battle Hawk
- Composer: Akihiro Komori
- Country of origin: Japan
- Original language: Japanese
- No. of seasons: 1
- No. of episodes: 26

Production
- Producers: Nobuyuki Oguma; Michio Shinohara
- Cinematography: Isao Yonezawa
- Editor: Minoru Kozono
- Running time: 22-26 minutes
- Production company: Knack Productions

Original release
- Network: Tokyo Channel 12 (now TV Tokyo)
- Release: October 4, 1976 – March 28, 1977

Battle Hawk (バトルホーク, Batoru Hōku) is a Japanese tokusatsu television series created by Go Nagai and Ken Ishikawa and produced by Toyo Agency, Dynamic Productions and Knack Productions in 1976. It was originally aired on Mondays, from 19:30 to 20:00 in Tokyo Channel 12 between October 1976 to March 1977. A manga series was also created, featuring a different story and serialized in the magazine Boken Oh (Akita Shoten).
