= Maboroshi Panty =

Japanese manga

- Cover of Maboroshi Panty published by Kasakura Publishing (2002)

まぼろしパンティ (maboroshi pantei)
- Manga
- Written by: Yasutaka Nagai
- Illustrated by: Go Nagai
- Published by: Shueisha
- Magazine: Monthly Shōnen Jump
- Original run: January 1981 – May 1982
- Volumes: 3
- Live-action film

Bishōjo Tantei Maboroshi Panty
- Directed by: Takafumi Nagamine
- Written by: Yukiko Okazaki
- Music by: Masaru Watanabe
- Studio: Maxam
- Released: November 25, 1991
- Runtime: 75 minutes

Maboroshi Panty (まぼろしパンティ, Maboroshi Panti; "Phantom Panties") is a Japanese manga created by Hiroshi Koenji and Go Nagai. The manga was originally serialized in the magazine Monthly Shōnen Jump by Shueisha. It is a parody of Maboroshi Tantei, just as Kekko Kamen is a parody of Gekko Kamen. And just like Kekko Kamen, the main heroine is almost nude (mostly topless), using panties as a mask. Her secret identity is the student Susumi Fuji. She decides to take the identity of Maboroshi Panty in order to help her father solve mysterious crimes.

Two direct-to-video live-action films based in the manga have been created, Bishōjo Tantei Maboroshi Panty (美少女探偵 まぼろしパンティ) in 1991 and Maboroshi Panty VS Henchin Pokoider in 2004, which was also based in another of Go Nagai's manga, Henchin Pokoider.

== Characters ==
- Maboroshi Panty (まぼろしパンティ)

Susumi's superhero alter-ego. Cutting two eyeholes in a pair of one of her panties, Susumi wears it as a mask, and dresses in only a scarf, gloves, boots, and underwear, she battles the sinister forces lurking in her school. Despite her martial arts knowledge, Maboroshi Panty's lack of experience sometimes leads her to make mistakes. She is also not above killing her adversaries, such as shooting a villain dead after he unmasks her.

- Susumi Fuji (藤寿々美)

The beautiful and innocent teenage daughter of the local Chief of Police. A bright girl at the top of her class, Susumi is concerned about the crime rate at her school. Possessing a strong sense of justice, Susumi makes it her goal to rid her school of its criminals.

- Inspector Fuji (藤 警部)

Susumi's widowed father, and the local Police Department's Chief Inspector. Inspector Fuji finds it difficult dealing with the area's high crime rate. Eventually, he receives help from the masked superhero, Maboroshi Panty, not knowing that she's his daughter Susumi. However, he eventually does find out her identity, and this allows father and daughter to collaborate on their respective cases.

- Tsutomu Yagyu (柳生つとむ)

A handsome male classmate of Susumi's, Tsutomu is also opposed to the new Principal's vile practices as well. After Maboroshi Panty rescues him from the clutches of the enemy, Tsutomu repeatedly assists her when she runs into danger.

- Toenail of Satan (サタンの足の爪)

In volume 3 of the manga, when the crime rate at Susumi's school continues to escalate, the administrators bring in Kekko Kamen's fiendish enemy, the villainous Toenail of Satan, to take over as the new Principal of the school. With him, the masked demon brings his usual team of sadistic teachers and humiliating punishments. Maboroshi Panty then seeks to put an end to the villain's method of education.

== Cast ==
- Miyuki Katori as Maboroshi Panty
- Misa Nakajo
- Dengeki Network (Tokyo Shock Boys)
- Suzumi Hanai
- Rinako Fujitani
- Mayumi Satoi
- Pichi Pichi Gals
