= Keaton Yamada =

Japanese voice actor (born 1945)

- キートン 山田
- Born: Shunji Yamada; October 25, 1945 (age 80); Mikasa, Hokkaido, Japan
- Occupations: Actor; voice actor; narrator
- Years active: 1970–2021
- Agent: Remax
- Height: 176 cm (5 ft 9 in)

Keaton Yamada (キートン山田, Kiiton Yamada; born Shunji Yamada (山田俊司, Yamada Shunji), October 25, 1945) is a Japanese former actor, voice actor and narrator from Mikasa, Hokkaido. He switched from going by his real name, Shunji Yamada, to going by Keaton Yamada in the 1980s. He is currently represented by Remax.

Yamada retired from voice acting in 2021 after stepping down as narrator for Chibi Maruko-chan.

== Filmography ==
=== Television animation ===
- Ganbare!! Robokon (1974) (Roboton)
- Getter Robo (1974) (Hayato Jin, Narrator)
- Chou Genji Robo Combattler V (1975) (Juuzou Naniwa)
- Ikkyū-san (1975) (Ashikaga Yoshimitsu)
- Wakusei Robo Danguard A (1977) (Tony Harken)
- Wakakusa no Charlotte (1978) (Louis)
- Candy Candy (1977-1978) (Tom, Additional Voices)
- Galaxy Express 999 (1978) (C62-50 Locomotive)
- Cyborg 009 (1979) (Albert Heinrich/004)
- The Rose of Versailles (1980) (Alain de Soissons)
- Lady Georgie (Bartender) (Episode 39)
- Attacker You! (1983) (Announcer)
- Giant Gorg (1984) (Dr. Wave)
- Mobile Suit Zeta Gundam (1985) (Jamaican Daninghan)
- Saint Seiya (1986) (Limnades Kasa)
- Sakigake!! Otokojuku (1988) (Baron Dino)
- Dragon Quest (1989) (Yanack)
- Chibi Maruko-chan (1990-2021) (Narrator)
- Bonobono (1995) (Fennec Kitsune-kun's father)
- Digimon Adventure (1999) (Bakemon)

=== OVA ===
- Legend of the Galactic Heroes (1993) (Alex Caselnes)
- Birdy the Mighty (1996) (Kouichirou)
- Master Keaton (1998) (Narrator)

=== Animated films ===
- Super Mario Bros.: The Great Mission to Rescue Princess Peach! (1986) (Hammer Bros.)
- Mobile Suit Zeta Gundam: A New Translation - Heirs to the Stars (2005) (Jamaican Daninghan)
- Mobile Suit Zeta Gundam: A New Translation II - Lovers (2005) (Jamaican Daninghan)

=== Dubbing roles ===
- Galaxy of Terror (1989 TBS edition) (Ranger (Robert Englund))
- Runaway Bride (Fisher (Héctor Elizondo))
