= Hanappe Bazooka =

1979–1982 manga series

- Cover of the DVD release of the OVA by Pioneer (2001)

花平バズーカ (Hanappe Bazuuka)
- Manga
- Written by: Kazuo Koike
- Illustrated by: Go Nagai
- Published by: Shueisha
- Magazine: Weekly Young Jump
- Original run: June 7, 1979 – January 7, 1982
- Volumes: 10
- Original video animation
- Directed by: Takahiro Ikegami
- Produced by: Ikuya Kōmori; Ryūji Kumano; Kio Inoue
- Written by: Fumio Nishikitera
- Music by: Nozomi Aoki
- Studio: Studio Signal
- Licensed by: NA: ADV Films
- Released: September 4, 1992
- Runtime: 46 minutes
- icon

Hanappe Bazooka (花平バズーカ, Hanappe Bazuuka) is a Japanese manga series created by Kazuo Koike and Go Nagai. It was originally published in Shueisha's Weekly Young Jump from 7 June 1979 to the issue of 7–14 January 1982. An OVA based on the manga was released in 1992 by Nippon Crown and was later released in the United States by ADV Films, in Italy by Dynamic Italia, and in Spain by Manga Films.

== Characters ==
- Hanappe Yamada (山田花平, Yamada Hanappe)
- Mephisto Dance (メフィスト・ダンス, Mefisuto Dansu)
- Ophisto Bazooka (オフィスト・バズーカ, Ofisuto Bazuuka)
- The Spirit of The World Tree (世界樹の精, Seikaiju no Sei)
