= Steel Jeeg =

Japanese anime television series

- Kotetsu Jeeg
- Kotetsu Jeeg DVD vol.5

鋼鉄ジーグ (Kōtetsu Jīgu)
- Genre: Mecha
- Created by: Go Nagai
- Manga
- Written by: Go Nagai
- Illustrated by: Tatsuya Yasuda
- Published by: Kodansha
- Magazine: TV Magazine; Otomodachi (extra chapters)
- Original run: August 1975 – June 1976
- Volumes: 2
- Anime television series
- Directed by: Masayuki Akehi
- Written by: Hiroyasu Yamaura; Keisuke Fujikawa; Toyohiro Ando
- Music by: Michiaki Watanabe
- Studio: Toei Animation
- Original network: NET (now TV Asahi)
- Original run: October 5, 1975 – August 29, 1976
- Episodes: 46

Steel Jeeg (鋼鉄ジーグ, Kōtetsu Jīgu), also known as Kotetsu Jeeg or Koutetsu Jeeg, is a Japanese mecha anime series created by manga artists Go Nagai and Tatsuya Yasuda and produced by Toei Doga (now Toei Animation), directed by Masayuki Akehi. It was first broadcast on NET in Japan from October 5, 1975, to August 29, 1976, lasting for 46 episodes. Steel Jeeg also ran as a manga in several children's publications, with the original manga was first serialized in Kodansha's TV Magazine from August 1975 to June 1976.

The series is the first installment in Takara's Magne-Robo franchise, which later became its own series after the rights of the show were passed to Dynamic Productions. A sequel series called Steel God Jeeg aired on the satellite network WOWOW, beginning April 5, 2007.

== Story ==
Hiroshi Shiba is a young car racer who is mortally wounded. His father Professor Shiba, a talented scientist and archaeologist, manages to restore him to life by means of a powerful relic from the ancient and mysterious Jamatai Kingdom, a bronze bell which is hidden inside Hiroshi's body and turns him unknowingly into a sort of cyborg.

As the ruler of Jamatai, queen Himika, reawakens from her slumber in the underground, it is revealed that the bell is also key to the reconquest of the Earth surface. Her henchmen kill Prof. Shiba in vain pursuit of the artifact, barely leaving the scientist time to upload his thought on a supercomputer at a specially built defense base. Anticipating the hidden menace, Professor Shiba has also prepared a giant fighting robot, Steel Jeeg, composed of interchangeable magnetic limbs and for which Hiroshi Shiba can become head and conscience. His mission is to defend modern Japan from the invaders, who also dispose of similar giant monsters (haniwa) and an army of minions. In such battles, Jeeg is also aided by a robot horse known as Panzeroid, and a fighting jet capable of shooting replacement components and specialized weapons for his body.

The series follows Hiroshi's character development and the underground civilization's efforts and subsequent failures to return to power causing internal civil war.

== Concept ==
Steel Jeeg is formed by combining the parts released by the Big Shooter jet, piloted by Prof. Shiba's young assistant, Miwa Uzuki. Hiroshi Shiba becomes the head of Steel Jeeg by bumping his fists together.

== Staff ==
Crew Type	Crew Member
Chief Director:	Masayuki Akehi
Episode Directors:	Kazuya Miyazaki; Masamune Ochiai; Masayuki Akehi; Yoshikata Nitta; Yugo Serikawa
Screenplays:	Hiroyasu Yamaura; Keisuke Fujikawa; Toyohiro Ando
Music:	Michiaki Watanabe
Original Creator:	Go Nagai; Tatsuya Yasuda
Character Design:	Kazuo Nakamura
Production:	NET (Now Tv Asahi), Toei Animation

== Theme music ==
Opening theme: "Song of Kotetsu Jeeg" (鋼鉄ジーグのうた, Kotetsu Jīgu no Uta), by Ichirou Mizuki with Columbia Yurikago-kai and Koorogi '73.

A complete and original intro theme called "El Vengador" (The Avenger) was composed and sung by musician Memo Aguirre for the Spanish dub of the series released in Latin America.

Ending theme: "Theme of Hiroshi" (ひろしのテーマ, Hiroshi no Tēma), by Ichirou Mizuki with Koorogi '73

== Video games ==
Jeeg makes an appearance in 2nd Super Robot Wars Alpha and Super Robot Wars Alpha 3 for the PlayStation 2, and in Super Robot Wars K and Super Robot Wars L for the Nintendo DS. The series also makes an international appearance in Super Robot Wars Y as part of DLC Pack 2.

== International transmission ==
Steel Jeeg was televised in many European countries, especially in Italy (known as Jeeg Robot d'acciaio), where it is still widely popular and has a huge fanbase. In the 1980s, the series was shown in Latin America as a part of El Festival de los Robots (Robot Festival) a giant robot show fashioned in the style of Force Five, in which it was called El Vengador (The Avenger), along with Gaiking, Starzinger and Magne Robo Gakeen. The anime has never been released in the United States.

== Sequel ==
On April 5, 2007, at 11:30 p.m. JST a sequel of Steel Jeeg called Steel God Jeeg began airing on the satellite network WOWOW.

== Other media ==
Besides its related media, Steel Jeeg has appeared in other media, including its appearance in the "Dynamic Super Robots Taisen" clips included at the end of the DVDs of Shin Getter Robot tai Neo Getter Robot. Steel Jeeg appears alongside Great Mazinger, Venus A, Getter Robot G, God Mazinger, Govarian and Groizer X to rescue Mazinger Z and Aphrodite A, but are defeated and in turn saved by Shin Getter Robot and Grendizer just before the arrival of Mazinkaiser.

The Italian film They Call Me Jeeg (Lo chiamavano Jeeg Robot) is a tribute to Steel Jeeg, from which takes up some thematics. The plot concerns a lonely misanthropic crook named Enzo, who gets superhuman strength after being affected by radioactive waste in the Tiber waters; he gradually loses his disinterest towards people thanks to Alessia, a mentally disabled girl who has mistaken him for Hiroshi Shiba, and gradually shifts from supercriminal to superhero in order to save her from a psycho gangster known as The Gipsy.
