= Susano Oh =

Japanese manga series

- Cover of Susano Oh #2 (2000 edition)

凄ノ王 (Susano Ō)
- Manga
- Written by: Go Nagai
- Published by: Kodansha
- Magazine: Weekly Shōnen Magazine
- Original run: July 22, 1979 – April 8, 1981
- Volumes: 9
- Novel series

Susano Oh Densetsu
- Written by: Yasutaka Nagai
- Published by: Kadokawa Shoten
- Original run: October 15, 1982 – October 16, 1987
- Volumes: 12
- Manga

Susano Oh Densetsu Hi Kami Ko
- Written by: Go Nagai
- Published by: Kadokawa Shoten
- Magazine: Variety
- Original run: June 1985 – March 1986
- Volumes: 7
- Manga

Shin Susano Oh
- Written by: Go Nagai
- Published by: Nihonbungeisha
- Magazine: Comic Hammer
- Published: July 14, 1987
- Volumes: 7
- Manga

Susano Oh Densetsu Yami no Majin Hen
- Written by: Go Nagai
- Published by: Kadokawa Shoten
- Magazine: Yasei Jidai
- Original run: April 1989 – April 1990
- Volumes: 7
- Manga

Susano Oh Densetsu Gaiden
- Written by: Go Nagai
- Published by: Kadokawa Shoten
- Magazine: Comic Comp
- Original run: May 1989 – June 1989
- Volumes: 7

Susano Oh (Japanese: 凄ノ王, Hepburn: Susano Ō) is a Japanese manga created by Go Nagai. It is loosely based on the Shinto deity Susanoo.

With this manga, Nagai won the Kodansha Manga Award in the shōnen category. The original serialization of Kodansha was suspended in 1981, but the success of the novels written by Yasutaka Nagai, prompted Kadokawa Shoten to request Go to resume his work on Susano Oh. With this, the manga would be published for a period of ten years, from 1979 to 1989. Even so, the manga was left with an open ending for a possible next part.

An RPG video game adaption titled Susano Oh Densetsu (Japanese: 凄ノ王伝説, Hepburn: Susano Ō Densetsu) was released in Japan by Hudson on April 27, 1989, on the PC Engine. A board game based on the series called Dreadful Susano Oh King Go Nagai was released by a company called Epoch.

== Plot ==
Highschool freshman Shingo Susa follows his childhood friend and crush Sayuri Yukishiro to their school's ESP club, whose members attempt to research psychic powers. However, they later discover there are two real psychics in the school: Chigusa Mitsurugi, the beautiful president of the club, and Rei Uryu, a resident prodigy who opposes Chigusa and offers to enhance the psychic potential of anybody who follows him. Uryu tries to recruit Susa, whom he knows to have an immense power latent, in order to help him fight for justice, but Susa declines out of loyalty for Chigusa.

Eventually Shingo and Sayuri become a couple, but a savage gang of delinquents attack them and rape her. The trauma blows up Shingo's bottled psychic potential and creates a violent, powerful alternate personality bent on getting revenge. Now as a changed person, and having lost track of Sayuri, Shingo fights through yakuza, thugs and his school's corrupt club alliance until discovering that the attack was ordered by a sinister organization named Nosferatu. The latter plans for world domination and has its own team of psychics, led by a mysterious woman named Carmilla, who has influence over the club federation. Shingo leads a school revolution against them, helped by Chigusa, boxing club leader Goda, kendo genius Tatsuya Mido and other students, and eventually overthrows their regime.

It is then revealed that Carmilla is actually a disguised Uryu and that Sayuri worked for him all along. Uryu staged the entire plot in order to liberate Shingo's powers and use him, as an incarnation of the legendary Susanoo, to destroy human civilization, so he could rebuild the world with only psychic humans. However, his plan is too successful, as Shingo loses control of his powers: a part of his soul leaves his body, hijacks a coming star, and becomes a prophesied apocalyptic monster, the Yamata no Orochi. His influence causes demons from other dimensions to start sliding into the world, possessing humans and provoking disasters, while Shingo's body lies apparently dead.

Chigusa reveals herself as the heir of an ancient clan of descendants of Atlantis, as well as the incarnation of ancient goddess Marici, and commands an Atlantean space force formed by clones of her in an attempt to destroy Yamata no Orochi. Shingo's family is also revealed to know the prophecy regarding him, and they join the Atlanteans in their fight. At the same time, Sayuri (who really fell in love with Shingo despite her duplicity) convinces Uryu to try to redeem Shingo by playing the roles of Ame no Uzume and Ame no Tajikarao, respectively. The story of the manga ends in midst of the climax.

In an additional epilogue in the manga's 1996 revised re-edition, Chigusa manages to neutralize the Yamata no Orochi in a secret Atlantean outpost in the Face of Mars. In an Earth ravaged and in a postapocalyptic state, Uryu and Sayuri come out of their refuge and look for Shingo, while Goda has overcome the possession of a demon and is now hunting other monsters. Shingo then comes alive again under the form of Susanoo, apparently now in full control of his powers, and walks past Goda before stopping in front of Uryu and Sayuri. The outcome of their encounter is not revealed.

== Media ==
=== Manga ===
==== Susano Oh ====
- Kodansha (KC Magazine, 1980–1981)

Japanese release date	Vol.	ISBN
January 17, 1980	1	978-4061726444
January 17, 1980	2	978-4061726451
February 18, 1980	3	978-4061726499
May 19, 1985	4	978-4061726659
July 17, 1980	5	978-4061726789
October 17, 1980	6	978-4061726949
November 18, 1980	7	978-4061727014
March 16, 1981	8	978-4061727373
May 18, 1981	9	978-4061727441

- Kodansha (KC Phoenix 10, 1996)

Japanese release date	Vol.	ISBN
June 21, 1996	1	978-4-063290103
July 23, 1996	2	978-4-063290110
August 23, 1996	3	978-4-063290127
September 20, 1996	4	978-4-063290134
October 23, 1996	5	978-4-063290141
November 22, 1996	6	978-4-063290158

- Kodansha (Kodansha Manga Bunko, 2000–2001)

Japanese release date	Vol.	ISBN
November 10, 2000	1	978-4-062608558
November 10, 2000	2	978-4-062608565
December 12, 2000	3	978-4-062608770
December 12, 2000	4	978-4-062608787
January 12, 2001	5	978-4-062608862
January 12, 2001	6	978-4062608879

- Fukkan.com (Kanzen Hatsude Shūkan Shōnen Magajin-ban, 2021–2022)

Japanese release date	Vol.	ISBN
December 24, 2021	1	978-4-835458465
January 21, 2022	2	978-4-835458472
February 28, 2022	3	978-4-835458489
March 23, 2022	4	978-4-835458496

- 001 Edizioni (Hikari Edizioni, 2022–present)

This edition is an Italian language translation for the European market.

Italian release date	Vol.	ISBN
March 23, 2022	1	978-8-871821788
June 1, 2022	2	978-8-871821900
November 16, 2022	3	978-8-871821917
TBA	4	—
TBA	5	—
TBA	6	—

==== Susano Oh Densetsu (Manga Version) ====
- Kadokawa (Kadokawa Shoten Yamato Comics Special, 1985–1990)

First five volumes of this edition are a reprint of the original Weekly Shōnen Magazine serialization. Volumes six and seven contain Susano Oh Densetsu Hi Kami Ko, Shin Susano Oh, Susano Oh Densetsu Yami no Majin Hen, and Susano Oh Densetsu Gaiden.

Japanese release date	Vol.	ISBN
July 31, 1985	1	978-4049210019
August 29, 1985	2	978-4049210026
September 30, 1985	3	978-4049210033
October 25, 1985	4	978-4049210040
November 29, 1985	5	978-4049210057
November 27, 1989	6	978-4049210309
August 28, 1990	7	978-4049210316

=== Novels ===
==== Susano Oh Densetsu (Novel Version) ====
- Kadokawa (Kadokawa Novels, 1982–1987)

Japanese release date	Vol.	ISBN
October 15, 1982	1	978-4047740013
February 17, 1983	2	978-4047740020
June 17, 1983	3	978-4047740037
October 15, 1983	4	978-4047740044
March 16, 1984	5	978-4047740051
October 18, 1984	6	978-4047740068
April 11, 1985	7	978-4047740075
November 15, 1985	8	978-4047740082
March 17, 1986	9	978-4047740099
November 17, 1986	10	978-4047740105
May 15, 1987	11	978-4047740112
October 16, 1987	12	978-4047740129

- Kadokawa (Kadokawa Library, 1988–1990)

Japanese release date	Vol.	ISBN
October 24, 1988	1	978-4041577516
December 16, 1988	2	978-4041577523
January 31, 1989	3	978-4041577530
April 20, 1989	4	978-4041577547
June 20, 1989	5	978-4041577554
September 1, 1989	6	978-4041577561
October 19, 1989	7	978-4041577578
December 13, 1989	8	978-4041577585
February 16, 1990	9	978-4041577592
April 17, 1990	10	978-4041577608
June 20, 1990	11	978-4041577615
August 21, 1990	12	978-4041577622
