= Masayuki Akehi =

Japanese anime director

- Born: March 17, 1937 (age 89); Matsuyama Ehime Prefecture Japan
- Occupation: anime director

Masayuki Akehi (明比 正行, Akehi Masayuki; Born March 17, 1937) is a Japanese anime director.

== Works ==
=== Director ===
- Steel Jeeg (TV series, 1975–1976)
- Jack and the Beanstalk (short film, 1975)
- Grendizer, Getter Robo G, Great Mazinger: Kessen! Daikaijuu (film, 1976)
- Bonjour Galaxy Express 999 (television film, 1979)
- Cyborg 009: Legend of the Super Galaxy (film, 1980)
- Arsene Lupin vs. Herlock Sholmes (television film, 1981)
- Kaba Enchō no Dōbutsuen Nikki (ja) (television film, 1981)
- Queen Millennia (film, 1982)
- Two Years' Vacation (television film, 1982)
- Silver Fang (TV series, 1986)
- Tatakae!! Ramenman (short film, 1988)
- Tatakae!! Ramenman (TV series, 1988)
- Saint Seiya: Saishū Seisen no Senshitachi (film, 1989)
- Hoero Basukettoman Tamashii!! Hanamichi to Rukawa no Atsuki Natsu (film, 1995)
