= Tatsuya Yasuda =

Japanese manga artist

- Born: 1952 (age 73–74); Hokkaido, Japan
- Known for: Manga art

Tatsuya Yasuda (安田 達矢, やすだ たつや, Yasuda Tatsuya), also known as Tatsuo Yasuda (安田 タツ夫, やすだ たつお, Yasuda Tatsuo), is a former member of Dynamic Productions. He was born in 1952 in the island of Hokkaido. Tatsuo joined Dynamic in 1975. He is mostly known for being the co-creator of Kotetsu Jeeg along with Go Nagai, which was also Yasuda's debut. Other titles were also created by Nagai and him.
