= D/visual =

Japanese movie and anime studio

d/visual incorporated (株式会社ディー・ビジュアル) is a Japanese movie studio and anime studio, licensing company and former publisher of manga books and anime home video.

It was established in October 2002 by Federico Colpi and Kazuhiko Murata.

In 1994 Go Nagai's Dynamic Planning established an international division, and Federico Colpi, formerly a free-agent and writer for Italian publisher Granata Press, France's Glénat Editions and Spain's Planeta DeAgostini, was the first director of the division. In this role, he established a network of companies in Europe and Asia, called the Dynamic Group of Companies, specializing in manga and anime which included, among others, Dynamic Italia (currently Dynit), Dynamic Visions (currently Dybex) and Dynamic Iberia (currently Selecta Visión).

In 2001 Dynamic Planning and Marubeni, through its subsidiary Omega Project, established in Tokyo a joint-venture called d/world. Both companies appointed Federico Colpi to CEO together with Omega Project's Toyoyuki Yokohama, and Kazuhiko Murata, former Chief Accountant at Dynamic Planning's International Division, became CFO.

In 2002, following Marubeni's temporary exit from the anime business, d/world was liquidated, and former directors Colpi and Murata acquired all activities through the newly established d/visual. Neither Marubeni nor Dynamic Planning hold shares of d/visual.

While being a Japanese company, d/visual published only material in foreign languages, mainly Italian and Chinese through sister company d/visual Asia inc.

Currently d/visual's main business is CG and VFX production for movies, animation and live-action dramas, including Shin Godzilla, Garo (TV series), Altered Carbon (TV series), Monster Strike (anime), Kingsglaive: Final Fantasy XV and others, through its studios in Taipei and Bangkok and a number of partners in Malaysia, Vietnam, Myanmar and India. Further, it manages a number of manga / anime oriented art galleries around Asia, the most prominent being d/art taipei, and through its licensing division represents a number of major Japanese properties around Asia. It also manages world's first Totoro-themed restaurant.
