= Isao Sasaki =

Japanese singer, actor

- ささき いさお
- Born: May 16, 1942 (age 84); Tokyo Prefecture, Japan
- Education: Musashi Junior and Senior High School
- Occupations: Actor; voice actor; singer
- Years active: 1960–present
- Spouse: Miyuki Ueda (m. 1981)
- Musical career
- Genres: Rockabilly; Anison
- Instrument: Vocals
- Labels: Nippon Columbia; Nippon Crown; Pony Canyon; King Records; Blues Interactions; Victor Entertainment; EMI Music Japan; VAP; Lantis
- Website: www5c.biglobe.ne.jp/~isao/

Isao Sasaki (ささき いさお(佐々木 功), Sasaki Isao; born May 16, 1942) is a Japanese actor, voice actor, and singer.

== Career ==
Sasaki has had voice roles in anime such as Legend of the Galactic Heroes, Space Battleship Yamato, and Gatchaman. He has also performed the opening themes for anime such as Yamato, Star of the Giants, Getter Robo, Casshern, Grendizer, Gaiking and tokusatsu series such as Himitsu Sentai Gorenger, J.A.K.Q. Dengekitai, Choujinki Metalder, and most recently Tokusou Sentai Dekaranger.

Sasaki has also had an acting role in the tokusatsu film Kamen Rider ZO, OOO, Den-O, All Riders: Let's Go Kamen Riders and in the series Kyojuu Tokusou Juspion. He is also known for dubbing over Sylvester Stallone, and Christopher Reeve.

As an actor, Sasaki was Selected for the lead role in Nagisa Ōshima's film The Sun's Burial in 1960 by Ōshima. Sasaki played the leading roles in seven films when he was an actor under contract with Shochiku studio. In 1969, he landed lead role on the TV jidaigeki Yōjutsu Bugeichō.

== Filmography ==
=== Film ===
- The Sun's Burial (1960) – Takeshi
- Mesu (1964) – Yoshida
- Pale Flower (1964) – Jirō
- Kuroineko (1965) – Shigeru Kizawa
- Kyōyou no Hanamichi Dos (1966) – Kanta
- Daikanbu Nagurikomi (1969) – Giro
- Zankoku Onnashikei (1969) – Okamoto
- Mujo (1970) – Yasuhiro Mori
- Taro! (1991) – Takamatsu
- Kamen Rider ZO (1993) – Dr. Mochizuki
- Tokusou Sentai Dekaranger The Movie: Full Blast Action (2004) – Michael Micson (voice)
- Space Battleship Yamato (2010) – Narrator
- OOO, Den-O, All Riders: Let's Go Kamen Riders (2011) – Shocker Scientist (Naoki)
- Kaizoku Sentai Gokaiger the Movie: The Flying Ghost Ship (2011) – Gatsun (voice)
- Saber + Zenkaiger: Super Hero Senki (2021) – Sentai Megid (voice)

=== Live action television series ===
- Yōjutsu Bugeichō (1969) – Kidō Makotonosuke (Lead role)
- Haru no Sakamichi (1971) – Matsudaira Tadanao
- Kamen Rider Ep.81 (1972) – Shintaro Mine
- Horror Theater Unbalance Ep.13 (1973) – Tatsuya Mori
- Hissatsu Shiokinin (1973) – Ep.6
- G-Men '75 (1975–81) Ep.145, 146, 147 and 148
- Hissatsu Karakurinin (1986) Ep.4
- Daitokai Part2 (1977–78) Ep.21, 41 and 52
- Seito Shokun! (1980) – Seiji Kitashiro
- Taiyō ni Hoero! (1983) Ep.544
- Kyojuu Tokusou Juspion (1985) – Ken'ichirou Nanbara
- Furuhata Ninzaburō Series 3 Ep.37, 38 (1999) – Mutouda
- Aoi Tokugawa Sandai (2000) – Hosokawa Tadaoki
- Shinsengumi! (2004) – Uchiyama Hikojirō
- Dondo Hare (2008) – Masato Yoshizawa
- Tenchijin (2009) – Daidōji Masashige

=== Television animation ===
- Science Ninja Team Gatchaman (1972) – George Asakura/Joe the Condor
- Space Battleship Yamato II (1978) – Hajime Saito
- Gatchaman II (1978) – George Asakura/Joe the Condor
- Gatchaman Fighter (1979) – George Asakura/Joe the Condor
- Les Aventures de Colargol (1979) – Crow
- The Mysterious Cities of Gold (1982) – Mendosa
- Ai Shite Knight (1983) – Go Kato
- Jungle Emperor 3rd Series (1989) – Panja
- The Galaxy Railways (2003) – Fahren Fort Drake
- Romance of the Three Kingdoms (2010) – Lü Bu
- She Professed Herself Pupil of the Wise Man (2022) – Mira/Dunbalf Gandagore/Sakimori Kagami (Male)

=== OVA ===
- Legend of the Galactic Heroes (1998) – Erich Von Haltenberg
- Great Yamato No. Zero (2004) – Sōji Ozuma
- Space Battleship Yamato 2202 (2018) – Shuntaro Yasuda

=== Theatrical animation ===
- Uchu Enban Daisenso (1975) – Duke Fleed
- Farewell to Space Battleship Yamato (1978) – Hajime Saito
- Final Yamato (1983) – Daisuke Shima

=== Video games ===
- Tatsunoko Fight (2000) – Joe the Condor, Announcement voice
- Hanjuku Hero Tai 3D (2003) – Eggman
- Hanjuku Hero 4 (2005) – Eggman, Isao Sasaki
- Tatsunoko vs. Capcom: Ultimate All-Stars (2008) – Joe the Condor

=== Dubbing roles ===
==== Live-action ====
- Sylvester Stallone
  - Escape to Victory (1982 Fuji Television edition) (Captain Robert Hatch)
  - Nighthawks (1987 TV Asahi edition) (Detective Sergeant Deke DaSilv)
  - First Blood (1995 TV Asahi edition) (John Rambo)
  - Rambo: First Blood Part II (1995 TV Asahi edition) (John Rambo)
  - Rocky IV (1995 TV Asahi edition) (Rocky Balboa)
  - Cobra (1994 TV Asahi edition) (Lieutenant Marion 'Cobra' Cobretti)
  - Rambo III (1994 TV Asahi edition) (John Rambo)
  - Tango & Cash (1993 TV Asahi edition) (Lt. Ray Tango)
  - Rocky V (1991 VHS edition) (Rocky Balboa)
  - Cliffhanger (2014 BS Japan edition) (Gabriel "Gabe" Walker)
  - Demolition Man (1997 TV Asahi edition) (Detective Sergeant John Spartan)
  - The Specialist (1998 TV Asahi edition) (Ray Quic)
  - Assassins (2000 TV Asahi edition) (Robert Rath)
  - Daylight (2000 TV Asahi edition) (Kit Latura)
  - Get Carter (2005 TV Tokyo edition) (Jack Carter)
  - Driven (2007 TV Tokyo edition) (Joe Tanto)
  - D-Tox (2006 TV Tokyo edition) (FBI agent Jake Malloy)
  - Shade (The Dean)
  - Taxi 3 (2005 Fuji TV edition) (Passenger to Airport)
  - Rambo (John Rambo)
  - The Expendables (Barney Ross)
  - The Expendables 2 (Barney Ross)
  - Bullet to the Head (James "Jimmy Bobo" Bonomo)
  - Escape Plan (Ray Breslin)
  - Grudge Match (Henry "Razor" Sharp)
  - The Expendables 3 (Barney Ross)
  - Guardians of the Galaxy Vol. 2 (Stakar Ogord)
  - Escape Plan 2: Hades (Ray Breslin)
  - Escape Plan: The Extractors (Ray Breslin)
  - Rambo: Last Blood (John J. Rambo)
  - Expend4bles (Barney Ross)
- Christopher Reeve
  - Superman (1983 TV Asahi edition) (Superman)
  - Superman II (1984 TV Asahi and 1990 TBS editions) (Superman)
  - Somewhere in Time (2021 BS TV Tokyo edition) (Richard Collier)
  - Superman III (1985 TV Asahi edition) (Superman)
  - Faerie Tale Theatre Season 2 Ep.3 Sleeping Beauty (1985 VHS edition) (Prince Charming)
  - Superman IV: The Quest for Peace (1989 TV Tokyo edition) (Superman)
  - The Great Escape II: The Untold Story (1990 TV Asahi edition) (Maj. John Dodge)
  - Village of the Damned (1998 TV Asahi edition) (Dr. Alan Chaffee)
- Hop (David Hasselhoff (David Hasselhoff))
- Superman (Jonathan Kent (Pruitt Taylor Vince))

==== Animation ====
- Balto (Steele)

== Music ==
- Stuck on You (本命はお前だ, Honmei wa Omae da) (1960)

Casshan (1973)

- Fight! Casshan (たたかえ！キャシャーン, Tatakae! Kyashān; opening)
- I am the Cyborg (おれは新造人間, Ore wa Shinzō Ningen; ending)
- Our Friender (Furender no Teema; Friender's theme) (along with Columbia Cradle Club)

Getter Robo (1974)

- Getter Robo! (ゲッターロボ！, Gettā Robo!; opening)
- Gattai! Getter Robo (合体！ゲッターロボ, Gattai! Gettā Robo; ending)

Hurricane Polymar (1974)

- Fight! Polymar (戦え!ポリマー, Tatakae! Porimā; opening)
- Turned Polymar (転身ポリマー, Tenshin Porimā; ending)

Space Battleship Yamato (1974)

- Space Battleship Yamato (宇宙戦艦ヤマト, Uchū Senkan Yamato; opening)
- Crimson Scarf (真赤なスカーフ, Makka na Sukāfu; ending)

Himitsu Sentai Gorenger (1975)

- Proceed! Gorenger (進め!ゴレンジャー, Susume! Gorenjā; opening theme, performed along with Mitsuko Horie)
- Fly! Variblune (とべ!バリブルーン, Tobe! Bariburūn)
- Aoranger from the Blue Sky (青い空からアオレンジャー, Aoi Sora Kara Aorenjā)
- Midoranger of Riddles (ナゾナゾのミドレンジャー, Nazonazo no Midorenjā) (along with Mitsuko Horie)
- Proceed, Gorenger Machines (進めゴレンジャーマシン, Susume Gorenjā Mashin)
- Gorenger Storm (ゴレンジャーストーム, Gorenjā Sutōmu) (along with Mitsuko Horie)
- It's Red Power, Akaranger (赤い力だアカレンジャー, Akai Chikara da Akarenjā)
- Here Comes Gorenger (ゴレンジャーがやってくる, Gorenjā ga Yattekuru)
- The Song of Varidreen (バリドリーンの歌, Baridorīn no Uta)
- Look!! Gorenger (見よ!! ゴレンジャー, Mi yo!! Gorenjā; ending theme 2)
- Stopping the Fight (戦いおわって, Tatakai Owatte)
- Secret Squadron Gorenger (秘密戦隊ゴレンジャー, Himitsu Sentai Gorenjā; ending theme 1)

Getter Robo G (1975)

- Immortal Getter Robo (不滅のマシーンゲッターロボ, Fumetsu no Mashīn Gettā Robo; ending)

Uchu Enban Daisenso (1975)

- Fight! Monarch of Space (戦え！宇宙の王者, Tatakae! Uchū no Ōja; opening)
- Star of Love in the Bud (もえる愛の星, Moeru Ai no Hoshi; ending)

Grendizer (1975)

- Fly! Grendizer (とべ！グレンダイザー, Tobe! Gurendaizā; opening)
- Space's Monarch Grendizer (宇宙の王者グレンダイザー, Uchū no Ōja Gurendaizā; ending)

Gaiking (1976)

- Great Sky Demon Dragon Gaiking (大空魔竜ガイキング, Daikū Maryū Gaikingu; opening)
- Gaiking of the Starry Sky (星空のガイキング, Hoshizora no Gaikingu; ending)

Grendizer, Getter Robo G, Great Mazinger: Kessen! Daikaijuu (1976)

- Now go! Robot army (いざ行け! ロボット軍団, Izaike! Robotto Gundan; opening)

J.A.K.Q. Dengekitai (1977)

- J.A.K.Q. Blitzkrieg Squad (ジャッカー電撃隊, Jakkā Dengekitai; opening theme)
- J.A.K.Q. Proceed J.A.K.Q. (J.A.K.Q進めジャッカー, Jakkā Susume Jakkā)
- Spade Ace, Young Lion (スペードエース若き獅子, Supēdo Ēsu Wakaki Shishi)
- J.A.K.Q. Covack (ジャッカーコバック, Jakkā Kobakku)
- J.A.K.Q. Machine Rock (ジャッカーマシンロック, Jakkā Mashin Rokku)
- Go! Sky Ace (行け!スカイエース, Yuke! Sukai Ēsu)
- J.A.K.Q. Theme of Love (ジャッカー愛のテーマ, Jakkā Ai no Tēma)
- Someday, Flowers Will Bloom (いつか、花は咲くだろう, Itsuka, Hana wa Saku Darō; ending theme)

Mazinger Z (English Version, 1977)

- MAZINGER Z (MAZINGER Z (マジンガーZ 英語版), Majingā Zetto (ENG); opening in english)
- Z THEME (Z THEME (Zのテーマ 英語版), Zetto no Tēma (ENG); battle theme in English)
- OUR MAZINGER Z (OUR MAZINGER Z (ぼくらのマジンガーZ 英語版), Bokura no Majingā Zetto (ENG); ending in English)

Starzinger (1978)

- Starzinger Theme (スタージンガーの歌, Sutājingā no Uta; Starzinger – opening 1)
- Starzinger the warrior of the Galaxy (宇宙の戦士スタージンガー, Uchuu no Senshi Sutājingā; Starzinger – opening 2)
- Our Starzinger (ぼくらのスタージンガー, Bokura no Sutājingā; Starzinger II – opening)

Message from Space: Galactic Wars (1978)

- Bravemen Across the Galaxy (勇者よ銀河を渡れ, Yūsha yo Ginga o Watare; opening)

Galaxy Express 999 (1978)

- Galaxy Express 999 (銀河鉄道999, Ginga Tetsudou Surī Nain; opening)
- Blue Earth (青い地球, Aoi Chikyuu; ending)

Tōshō Daimos (1978)

- Stand Up! Brave Leader Daimos (立て！闘将ダイモス, Tate! Tōshō Daimos; opening)

Science Ninja Team Gatchaman II (1978)

- We, Gatchaman (われらガッチャマン, Warera Gatchaman; opening)
- Dreaming of Tomorrow (明日夢見て, Ashita Yume Mite; ending, performed along with Mitsuko Horie)

Farewell to Space Battleship Yamato (English Version, 1978)

- Space Battleship Yamato / Space Cruiser Yamato (宇宙戦艦ヤマト, Uchū Senkan Yamato; opening in English)
- The Red Scarf / Crimson Scarf (真赤なスカーフ, Makka na Sukāfu; ending in English)

The 6 Ultra Brothers vs. the Monster Army (1979)

- Our Ultraman (ぼくらのウルトラマン, Bokura no Urutoraman; Japanese Opening, with Columbia Cradle Club)

The Ultraman (1979)

- The Ultraman (ザ・ウルトラマン, Za Urutoraman; opening, with Columbia Cradle Club)
- Brave men of Love (愛の勇者たち, Ai no Yūsha Tachi; ending)

Gatchaman Fighter (1979)

- Gatchaman Fighter (ガッチャマンファイター, Gacchaman Faitā; opening)

Kamen Rider The Movie Eight Riders vs. Gingaoh (1980)

- Shine! 8 Riders (Movie Version) (輝け!8人ライダー, Kagayake! Hachinin Raidā; opening, with The Chirps)

G-Men '75 (1979–80)

- Requiem (レクイエム, ending)

Space Emperor God Sigma (1980)

- Do Your Best, Space Warrior (がんばれ宇宙の戦士, Ganbare Uchuu no Senshi; opening)

Choujinki Metalder (1987)

- Is Your Youth Shining? (君の青春は輝いているか, Kimi no Seishun wa Kagayaite Iru ka; opening theme)

Gekigangar 3 (OVA, 1998)

- The Robot of Justice Gekigangar 3 (正義のロボット ゲキ・ガンガー3, Seigi no Robotto Gekigangā 3; Movie opening)
- V is for Victory! Gekigangar V (勝利のVだ！ ゲキ・ガンガーV, Shouri no V da! Gekigangā V)

Ultraseven 1999 The Final Chapters (1999)

- Ultraseven song 99 (ウルトラセブンの歌99, Urutorasebun no uta 99; opening)
- The Ballad of Ultraseven (ウルトラセブンのバラード, Urutorasebun no barādo; ending)

Ultraseven 35th Anniversary EVOLUTION (2002)

- Ultraseven song 99 (Remix Version) (ウルトラセブンの歌99, Urutorasebun no uta 99; opening)
- ULTRA SEVEN 99 (ULTRA SEVEN 99, Urutorasebun 99; ending, ft. Shinichi Ishihara, Naoto Fuuga and Yoshito Fuchigami)

The Galaxy Railways (2003)

- The Galaxy Express is Far Away (銀河鉄道は遙かなり, Ginga Tetsudou wa Haruka nari; opening)
- Glitter of the Galaxy (銀河の煌, Ginga no Hikari; ending)

Tokusou Sentai Dekaranger (2004)

- Midnight Dekaranger (ミッドナイト デカレンジャー, Middonaito Dekarenjā; ending theme 1)
- DekaMaster NEVER STOP (デカマスターNEVER STOP, Dekamasutā Nebā Sutoppu)

Romance of the Three Kingdoms (Japanese Version, 2010)

- Wind Conversation (風の会話, Kaze no Kaiwa; Opening in Japanese)

Space Battleship Yamato 2199 (2013)

- Space Battleship Yamato (宇宙戦艦ヤマト, Uchū Senkan Yamato; opening)
- Crimson Scarf (真赤なスカーフ, Makka na Sukāfu; ending theme 3)

Tokusou Sentai Dekaranger 10 YEARS AFTER (2015)

- Midnight Dekaranger 10 YEARS AFTER (ミッドナイト デカレンジャー 10 YEARS AFTER, Middonaito Dekarenjā Ten Iyāzu Afutā; opening)

Space Battleship Yamato 2202 (2017)

- Space Battleship Yamato 2202 (宇宙戦艦ヤマト2202, Uchū Senkan Yamato Ni-ni-zero-ni; opening)

Kikai Sentai Zenkaiger (2021)

- All over the world united! Juragaon (全界合体！ジュラガオーン, Zenkai Gattai! Juragaōn; performed along with Mitsuko Horie)
