= Robo Formers =

- The VHS box logo for Robo Formers.
- Based on: Getter Robo G and Gaiking by Toei Animation
- Written by: John Gray
- Directed by: Randy Green
- Voices of: Michele Green; Allan Sanders; Joyce Gillies; Henry Alice; Natalie Cooper
- Country of origin: United States
- No. of episodes: 8

Production
- Running time: 40–50 minutes
- Production company: FB Productions

Robo Formers was a series of VHS videos distributed in the 1980s and 1990s. The episodes revolve around the Evil Empire of the Pandamoniums and their attempts to take over the Earth against which the Robo Formers team stands as defenders of the planet.

The episodes themselves were taken from the cartoon series Starvengers which itself was the English title for the Japanese animated series Getter Robo G. Starvengers was produced by Jim Terry under his Force Five anime series line-up. Robo Formers was a redub of Starvengers. One exception was a single episode (see below) of Robo Formers that was redubbed from Gaiking, another of Jim Terry's Force Five series.

The Robo Formers videos have no distributor information on the box although FB Productions appears on the inside of the box. The packaging designer is Can-Vision. Each title begins with the word "star".

== Episode list ==
Star Battle:The Centre Battle - "The Mariana Triangle. Is it another Bermuda Triangle lying inactive for centuries -- or is it the sinister creation of the Evil Empire? Ships loaded with ore disappear mysteriously, leaving not a trace of their passing. The Robo Formers in their sworn role as the protectors of the planet, try to unravel the mystery -- only to end up in a massive battle with the weapons and robots that have been created using the missing ore by the Evil Empire." (stock number RF 88801)

Star Birds:Birds of Prey -- "The Pandemoniums try to destroy the planet while keeping the Robo Formers trapped in their own headquarters. Will the U.N.O. forces be of greater help or will they get help from the natural birds of prey trained by the evil empire? The battle between natural predator and super science makes for a very exciting climax." (stock number RF 88802)

Star of Fear:Imagination - "The Advanced Aquatic development of humans has become a problem for the Pandamoniums, who have established their own secret, underwater headquarters. Action and adventure explode as the Robo Formers confront the mechanical creations of the evil Pandamonium Emperor in the underwater battlefields of Earth. The excitement is non-stop and the effects are nothing short of spectacular." (stock number RF 88803)

Starfire:Starfire - "The secret Arctic base of the Evil Empire has finally succeeded in manufacturing the ultimate Mega Flying Fortress, with the capacity to carry two giant robots on board. They each have Thrust Power ten times that of the Robo Formers. Have he Pandamoniums finally developed the ultimate weapon to use against the Earth? Will evil finally reign triumphant? Don't miss the most exciting adventure of the Robo Formers." (stock number RF 88804)

Starbeams:The Omnicron Ray - "With the help of the Mega Sword King, the Pandamoniums finally succeed in penetrating the Robo Formers headquarters. Not only do they try to steal the Omnicron Ray, the fuel of the future, but also to blow up the Robo Formers' laboratories. In a never ending battle for justice, the Star Vengers use every ounce of strength and endurance to stop the evil Pandamoninums." (stock number RF 88805)

Star Warrior:Silent Warrior -- "Earth's most modern battleship, the Sea Force, is helpless against the well planned attack of the modern-time Hitler, The Feuhrer. Can even the Robo Formers stand in the way of the might of the Feuhrer's armada of giant robots and mega weapons? The finale will have you on the edge of your seat as World War III lurks in the wings." (stock number RF 88806)

Star Defense:Earth Defense -- "The secret headquarters of the Evil Empire is no longer a secret. Can the Robo Formers succeed in destroying their base once and for all? The evil fortress is seemingly impenetrable and the Robo Formers must bring all their weapons as well as their intellect to bear on the mission. The evil super-robots and the Robo Formers go head to head in all out battle." (stock number RF 88807)

Star Attack:Attack of the Xelans - "The evil Darius Empire forces Professor Wolcot, the greatest scientist in the Universe to create deadly instruments of war in their bid to conquer the Earth. The Robo Formers only defense are the super-androids Pela and his flying horse, Pegasus. They possess the secret Hydroblaze, the only defense mechanism that can overcome the Darian Empire's attack. Is the sacrifice of a sensitive android with a human heart, to a soulless mechanical onslaught the only way to victory? The answer will move you." (stock number RF 88808)

The episode descriptions come from the back of the VHS boxes for their respective titles.

NOTE: This episode was from Jim Terry's Gaiking series.

Running time for each video is listed at approximately 50 minutes but typically they are a little over 40 minutes. Recording is usually in SP mode but LP and EP recording modes may sometimes appear and in some cases, the tapes are used, the Robo Formers label being applied right over the original tape label. In one case, a copy of the "Starfire" episode was a National Geographic video that was taped over.

At the close of each video are the production credits. In addition to those listed above:

Filmography: Richard Allan
Art Director: Gary Sanders

Recording was done at Dubbing Crossroads Studio.

== Other notes ==
On a copy of the episodes "Starbeams" and "Star Defense", the credits for Jim Terry's original Starvengers was not edited out, appearing before the Robo Formers credits.

The title of Robo Formers may have been adapted from the UK name for Jim Terry's Starvengers series, that being Formators.

In the Robo Formers episode "Starbeams", the Robo Formers are called the Star Vengers. The series Robo Formers was taken from was called Starvengers.

Recently, EastWest DVD, a company producing low cost DVD movies for distribution to variety stores such as Dollar Tree, includes Star Warrior & Starbirds:Birds of Prey (copyright 2007) in their line-up but not under the Robo Formers title.
