= List of Gaiking: Legend of Daiku-Maryu episodes =

Gaiking: Legend of Daikū-Maryū (Japanese: ガイキング LEGEND OF DAIKU-MARYU Hepburn: Gaikingu Rejendo Obu Daikū Maryū^{?}, lit. Gaiking: Legend of the Divine Demon-Dragon) is a Super Robot mecha anime series produced by Toei Animation. It is a re-imagining of the original series created by Mitsuru Kaneko, Akio Sugino and Dan Kobayashi and was aired in TV Asahi from November 12, 2005, to September 24, 2006, lasting a total of 39 episodes.

== Episodes ==
#	Title	Original airdate
1	"The Arrival of Daiku-Maryu!" "Daikû Maryû ga kita!" (完成品の到着!)	November 12, 2005
Daiya Tsuwabuki is a boy in junior high who is known as the town liar. He claims that five years ago, he was saved by a large mechanical dragon when he and his father were attacked at sea by mechanical beasts.
2	"I Am the Chosen warrior!" "Ore ga Erabareta Senshi!?" (私は選ばれた戦士!)	November 19, 2005
Daiya meets the crew of Daiku-Maryu, which includes Lulu, Gaiking's supporter; Captain Garis; Vice Captain Rosa; Shizuka and Daimon in charge of the engine room; and Puria, the pilot of Stinger and the ace fighter of Daiku-Maryu.
3	"The Start of a Journey... Farewell, Mom!" "Tabidachi... saraba kâsan!" (旅の始まり.さらば、ママ!)	November 26, 2005
Daiya learns that for their fight against the Darius Army, they have to go to the other world at the core of the earth, and Captain Garis gives Daiya some time to go say goodbye to his mother.
4	"Let's Go! Operation Enter Darius!" "Ikuze! Dariusu totsunyû sakusen" (行きましょう！操作は、ダライアスを入力してください!)	December 3, 2005
In order to return to Darius, Daiku-Maryu must go through Death Cross Point and mend the subspace in order to prevent the enemy from going to the surface.
5	"We're the Bad Guys?!" "Oretachi warumono!?" (私達は悪者ですか?)	December 10, 2005
Daiku-Maryu arrives in Darius and goes to a regional city called Paltegona to stock up on food and supplies. Captain Garis orders Rosa to take Daiya and Puria into town with her in order to give them an opportunity to start getting along.
6	"What Will We Do?! Launching is Impossible!" "Dô suru!? Shutsugeki funô!!" (我々 は何をしますか?起動は不可能だ!)	December 17, 2005
Captain Garis temporarily assigns Daiya to five sections on the ship to decide which section he will join permanently.
7	"Clash! An Honorable Duel" "Gekitotsu hokori takaki kettô"	December 24, 2005
Daiku-Maryu docks at a tropical island where the crewmembers enjoy some beach time. Then from the other side of the island, they hear the sound of wild Demon Beasts, which are indigenous Demon Beasts that have not yet been made evil by the Darius Army.
8	"The Smallest Strongest Enemy in History" "Shijô saishô no tomo" (衝突!名誉の決闘)	January 14, 2006
On their way to their fort in Ohmazan, Daiku-Maryu takes a break in the Kanalups Mountains. Puria, who gets into a foul mood watching Daiya and Lulu having a great time, decides to play a prank on Daiya.
9	"Face the Future and Fire!" "Ashita ni mukatte ute!" (未来と火災に直面!)	January 21, 2006
One day on their way to the Ohmazan fort, Daiku-Maryu is attacked by a giant turtle beast, Domega. During the battle, Daiya and Lee try to combine Gaiking and Serpent to become Buster Gaiking, but Lee fails in the attempt.
10	"Lulu's Crisis! Terror on the Sea Floor" "Ruru no kiki! Kaitei no kyôfu!!" (ルルの危機!海の底で恐怖)	January 28, 2006
As Daiku-Maryu approaches the dark continent of Arkholand where the Darius Army headquarters is located, Lulu starts having nightmares about her childhood and the black flame.
11	"Violent Tremors!! General Noza Attacks!" "Gekishin!! Shôgun Nôza shûrai!" (激震!一般 Noza 攻撃!)	February 4, 2006
One day, Grotecter warships of Northern General Noza fly past Daiku-Maryu. They are on their way to create another Death Cross Point, the hole that connects to the world above the surface.
12	"Life-or-Death Gamble?! The Forbidden Comeback Technique" "Inochigake!? Kindan no gyakuten waza" (生死を賭けたギャンブル!禁断の復活法)	February 18, 2006
While Grotecter warships are forming Death Cross Point, Noza challenges Daiya to another duel. Daiya goes against Garis's order and accepts, even though he is daunted by Noza's strength.
13	"Shock! The Captain is Father?!" "Shôgeki! Kyaputen wa tôsan!?" (ショック!船長は父!)	February 25, 2006
After the battle with Noza, the captain and Daiya fall ill, and Daiku-Maryu, as well as Stinger and Serpent, are badly damaged. Captain makes Lulu command the ship in his absence, and reveals his identity to Daiya.
14	"Amusement Park Battle! Rosa's Day Off" "Yuenchi batoru! Rôsa no kyûjitsu" (遊園地バトルローサの休日)	March 19, 2006
After the battle with Noza, Daiku-Maryu and Gaiking get repaired in a new fort built by rebel forces in an abandoned desert city.
15	"A Dangerous Fugitive! A Clue about Father!" "Kiken-na tôbôsha!! Tôsan no tegakari!" (危険な逃亡者!父についての手掛かり!)	March 26, 2006
During a battle in the air, a civilian airplane asks Daiku-Maryu for help, and Lulu agrees to let him come on board. The pilot, a Darius man named Jan, demands to be taken to the surface world and tries unsuccessfully to hijack Daiku-Maryu.
16	"Break Through the Cordon! Lee and the Female Panther" "Hôimô toppa! Rî to Johyô!" (非常線を突破します!リーと女性のパンサー)	April 2, 2006
One day, Lee goes on a recon mission and saves Vestarnu, who is being attacked by droid soldiers at Proist's secret quarry. She gets gunpowder in her eyes and becomes temporarily blinded.
17	"Friend or Foe?! A Dangerous New Force" "Teki ka mikata ka!? Kiken-na shinsenryoku!" (敵か味方か!危険な新しい力)	April 9, 2006
Daiku-Maryu arrives in the lawless city of Zangyle. Captain Garis tells Rosa to oversee the ship while he goes into town.
18	"Super Weapon! The Trump Card of Darius" "Chôheiki! Dariusu no kirifuda" (超兵器!ダリウスの切り札)	April 16, 2006
Dick attacks Gaiking to get to the enemy, and while the enemy falters, Gaiking counterattacks. Although they managed to get through the battle, everybody is furious at Dick for his dangerous tactic.
19	"The New Emperor's Trap! Gaiking's Execution!!" "Shin kôtei no wana! Gaikingu shokei!!" (新皇帝の罠!ガイキングの実行!)	April 23, 2006
Powerless against the enhanced Steel Beast, Stinger, Serpent, and Killjaguar retreat to Daiku-Maryu for the time being, but they learn that Proist ordered a public execution for Gaiking.
20	"Mini Mini Machines! The Big Treasure Hunt Race!" "Minimini mashin! Hihô sôdatsu mô rêsu!!" (ミニ ミニ マシン!大きな宝探しレース!)	April 30, 2006
One day on a deserted island, Garis proposes a race to go find Windarium, a mineral ore that can counterattack Darius's ice beam. The winner will become the Daiku-Maryu captain for a day, and ten crewmembers decide to participate in the race.
21	"100% Accurate Fortune Telling! Lulu Hits the Mark!!" "Uranai tekichû 100-pâsento!? Zubari iu Ruru!! (100% 正確な占い!ルルは、マークを打つ!)	May 7, 2006
Lulu starts reading people's fortunes when one day, she predicts that Bry, the rebel fighter and Daiku-Maryu supporter, will reunite with someone special. Meanwhile, Daiya gets jealous watching her read fortunes for other people.
22	"Burn, Three Idiots! Stolen Gaiking!!" "Moero 3 baka!! Ubawareta gaikingu!!" (書き込み、三馬鹿!盗まれたガイキング!)	May 14, 2006
One day, Yanma, Haccho, and Booby, in an attempt to prove their usefulness, force themselves onto Gaiking with Daiya, but Gaiking gets captured by the enemy, and Daiya and the trio are taken back to the enemy warship.
23	"Sakon Escapes?! The Silent Attack of an Assassination Squad" "Sakon dassô!? Shizuka ni semaru ansatsu butai!!" (左近エスケープ!暗殺部隊のサイレント攻撃)	May 21, 2006
One day, Shizuka looks frantically for Dr. Sakon, but he is nowhere on the ship. Shizuka becomes furious and takes off on Stinger to go find him.
24	"Pink Hippos that Trot across the Battlefield!! Who's the Idol?" "Senjô wo kakeru pinku no kaba!! Aidoru wa dare da?" (戦場に小走りに走るピンクのカバ!アイドルは誰ですか)	May 28, 2006
The Daiku-Maryu crewmembers start seeing pink hippos everywhere on the ship. Dr. Franklin informs them that they are hallucinations from Limitation Syndrome, which occurs when people feel stressed out.
25	"Crewmembers Fallen to Hell! You're the Idol!" "Jigoku ni ochita kurû-domo! Aidoru wa kimi da!!" (乗組員地獄に落ちた!あなたはアイドル!)	June 4, 2006
The Daiku-Maryu idol contest enters the final round in which the candidates become an idol for the deciding popularity vote. They each make a performance that will attract the crew's attention.
26	"Prelude to a Nightmare! Revival of Daichi-Maryu!!" "Akumu no jokyoku! Yomigaeru Daichi Maryû!!" (悪夢への前奏曲!大地大空魔竜の復活!)	June 11, 2006
Concerned about Captain Garis's odd behavior, Dick and Daiya take off on a surveillance mission and land in a ruined city. There, Dick runs into Proist, and Daiya into Noza.
27	"Black Past Uncovered! Garis's Mask of Sadness" "Abakareta kuroi kako! Garisu kanashimi no kamen!!" (黒い過去が暴かれる!悲しみの Garis のマスク)	June 25, 2006
Daiku-Maryu gets attacked by Vestarnu and her Steel Beasts, and Lulu gets kidnapped. To get her back, Proist tells Garis to come alone to the place where he hid Tenku-Maryu.
28	"Sin and Punishment and the Cursed Child! Tenku-Maryu of Love and Hate!" "Tsumitobachi to noroi no ko! Aizô no Tenkû Maryû!!" (罪と罰と呪い子!愛と憎しみの天空品!)	July 9, 2006
Dick intervenes just in time and takes the blade in the shoulder instead of Garis. Lulu gets taken away again by Proist, and Garis and the others return to Daiku-Maryu. There, Sakon, Daimon, and Franklin reveal Garis and Lulu's secret.
29	"Deadly Full Course Attack! Saspazi Laughs Last!!" "Kurae hissatsu no furukôsu! Saigo ni warau sasupêji!!" (致命的なフルコース アタック!Saspazi 笑最後!)	July 16, 2006
Garis must be taken to a rebel fort to get treated, but in order to get there, Daiku-Maryu must fly through a dangerous minefield.
30	"The Successor is 13 Years Old! It's an All-Out War, Captain Lulu!" "Nidaime wa 13-sai! Sôryokusen da ze Kyaputen Ruru!!" (後継者は、13 歳です!キャプテン ルルは全面戦争だ!)	July 23, 2006
Daiku-Maryu docks by a beautiful lake, and the crewmembers enjoy a moment of relaxation. There, Daiya compares his friend Naoto and his video games to their battle against Raiking and Vulking.
31	"Look! Praise! Kneel! Arrival of the Wild God Great!!" "Miyo! Tataeyo! Hizamazuke! Kôjin Aragami gurêto kôrin!!" (見て!賞賛!ひざまずく!野生の神の偉大な到着!)	July 30, 2006
Lee infiltrates Daichi-Maryu and finds a way to undo the brainwash on Vestarnu. He tells Daiya to do the same thing to Noza. Shizuka and Sakon overtake Tenku-Maryu, and now the three Maryus and the three Giants of Flame are under their control.
32	"No Weapons, No Bullets, Yes Best Friend! Just the Two of Us in a Battle on the Surface!!" "Buki nashi dan nashi shin'yû ari! Futaribotchi no chijô-sen!!" (武器、行頭文字なしはいベスト フレンド!表面上の戦いで私たちの二人だけ!)	August 6, 2006
Daiya and Puria are blown away to the surface on Gaiking's torso and Superior Stinger. They find themselves on a deserted island but don't have enough flame in their machines to fly anywhere.
33	"Goodbye, Innocence! Light the Flame in the Wild Boy's Heart!" "Sayonara junjô! Choi waru hâto ni hi wo tsukero!!" (さようなら、無罪!野生の少年の心の炎を点灯!)	August 13, 2006
When Kaikink is fixed, more Steel Beasts attack the cargo ship. Then suddenly, Killjaguar and Daiku-Maryu show up and join the battle. They destroy the Steel Beasts, and Daiya and Puria go back onto Daiku-Maryu.
34	"NEX's True Intention! An Angel's Kiss for the City of Wolves..." "NEX no harawata!! Ôkami no machi" (NEX の本音!オオカミの都市のために天使のキス.)	August 20, 2006
Daiku-Maryu heads toward the coast of California looking for the remnants of the Super Maryu.
35	"Huge Massacre! Huge Development!! God, the Capital is Sinking..." "Daigyakusatsu! Daitenkai!! Kamiyo, teito ga shizumu..." (巨大な大虐殺!巨大開発!神は、首都はシンク.)	August 27, 2006
Daiku-Maryu returns to Darius with a special missile that creates Death Cross Point. They join up with Lee and Vestarnu on Daichi-Maryu and head toward Darius Capital.
36	"Reunion, the Father who Betrayed! But I love you so much!!" "Saikai uragiri no chichi! Konna ni aishiteru no niii!!" (再会、父を裏切った!しかし、私はあなたが大好き!	September 3, 2006
Emperor Darius contacts Lulu and asks her to stop Proist. He asks for a meeting and says he will bring Daiya's father with him. Lulu thinks that it may be a trap, but decides to meet him anyway.
37	"My Son" "Musuko yo" (私の息子	September 10, 2006
Proist puts Daiya's dad in a pod inside the Super Maryu Beast, Final Dvorzak. The pod is connected to the beast's heart with cords, and when Daiya tries to pull it out, some cords break, making his dad feel excruciating pain.
38	"Everyone, Burn" "Minna, moero" (誰も、書き込み	September 17, 2006
Lulu is devastated over Dick's death and refuses to command the ship until Rosa makes her come to her senses. Daiya returns to Daiku-Maryu for refueling and have a tearful reunion with his father.
39	"Your Earth, Your Future" "Kimi no chikyû, kimi no mirai" (あなたの地球は、あなたの未来	September 24, 2006
Proist comes back to life after her four generals sacrifice their lives for her. She shows up in Daiku-Maryu, and turns into a demon out of jealousy and rage when she sees Daiya with his dad and Lulu with her dad, Garis.
