= Live in Seoul =

Live in Seoul may refer to:

== Albums ==
- Live in Seoul, by Metallica 2006 DVD
- Live in Seoul, by Placido Domingo 1997
- Live in Seoul, by Isao Sasaki 2014
- Live in Seoul, by Dream Theater 2000
- Live in Seoul, by Avril Lavigne 2004 DVD
- Live in Seoul, by Journey (band), 2005 DVD
