= Grendizer, Getter Robo G, Great Mazinger: Kessen! Daikaijuu =

1976 film by Masayuki Akehi

- Directed by: Masayuki Akehi
- Written by: Susumu Takaku
- Produced by: Chiaki Imada
- Starring: Akira Kamiya; Hiroya Ishimaru; Keaton Yamada; Kei Tomiyama; Keiichi Noda
- Music by: Shunsuke Kikuchi; Michiaki Watanabe
- Production companies: Toei Doga, Dynamic Planning
- Distributed by: Toei Company
- Release date: July 18, 1976 (Japan)
- Running time: 31 minutes
- Country: Japan
- Language: Japanese

Grendizer, Getter Robo G, Great Mazinger: Kessen! Daikaijuu (グレンダイザー・ゲッターロボG・グレートマジンガー 決戦!大海獣, Gurendaizā Gettā Robo Jī Gurēto Majingā Kessen! Daikaijū; lit. Grendizer, Getter Robo G and Great Mazinger: Decisive Showdown! The Giant Sea Beast) is an animated short film produced by Toei which premiered originally on July 18, 1976, in Japan. It is a crossover of three super robot anime: Grendizer, Getter Robo G and Great Mazinger. Like the rest of the Vs. animated films of Toei, the movie features alternate versions of events from the three series and is not canonical to any of them. The film was released in almost all countries where the original Grendizer series was broadcast. It is known as Il Grande Mazinga, Getta Robot e Goldrake contro il Dragosauro in Italy and Goldorak: L'attaque du Dragosaure in France and some parts of Canada.

== Story ==
The Dragonsaurus, a mysterious prehistoric animal surviving undiscovered in the depths of the oceans, seeds panic by devouring huge quantities of oil across the globe. It heads for Tokyo, where the Japanese forces are prepared to stop the creature with three super robots: Grendizer, Great Mazinger and Getter Robo G. They are immediately sent to stop the monstrous animal. Unfortunately, the awkward robot Boss Borot joins the team and ends up being swallowed by the Dragonsaurus, rendering their objective all the more difficult. Boss Borot eventually escapes the creature's stomach with help from Great Mazinger. As the three super robots engage with the monster, it makes its way to Tokyo and goes on a rampage. The Dragonaurus is eventually defeated after Getter Robo G uses its Shine Spark attack to ignite the large quantities of oil in its body, destroying the creature and saving the city.

=== Dragonsaurus ===
The main antagonist of the film, the Dragonsaurus, is an ancient reptilian animal that grew to large sizes from the oil it consumes, with a maximum length of 550 meters and weighing 40,000 tons. The Dragonsaurus has seven serpent-like tentacles that can extend very long distances and are used as its primary attack. The Dragonsaurus also has extremely potent regeneration abilities, allowing it to regrow any severed tentacle in a matter of seconds and make it extremely resistant, if not completely immune, to electric attacks like the Grendizer Double Spazer's Cyclone Beam and acid attacks like Grendizer's Melt Shower. The Dragonsaurus' body also has a high resistance to energy beams and absorbs projectiles such as missiles through its skin where they fail to detonate. To move on land, the Dragonsaurus possesses the ability to levitate, but also uses its tentacles to create hurricane-force winds.

The Dragonsaurus later appears in various Super Robot Wars titles as a boss character, and in Super Robot Wars Reversal and Super Robot Wars MX, it uses a powerful sonar attack.

== Staff ==
- Production: Studio: Toei Doga, Dynamic Planning
- Original work: Go Nagai, Ken Ishikawa, Dynamic Production
- Director: Masayuki Akechi
- Assistant director: Kazumi Fukushima
- Animation director: Tatsuji Kino
- Scenario: Susumu Takahisa
- Planning: Ken Ariga, Katsuya Oda
- Producer: Chiaki Imada
- Executive producer: Saburo Yokoi
- Art director: Mataharu Urata
- Music: Shunsuke Kikuchi, Michiaki Watanabe
- Theme Song: "Izaike! Robot Gundan" (いざ行け! ロボット軍団, Izaike! Robotto Gundan; translated as "Now go! Robot army") (lyrics by Kogo Hotomi)
- Theme Song Performance: Isao Sasaki, Columbia Yurikago-kai
- Cast: Kei Tomiyama (Daisuke Umon/Duke Fleed), Hiroya Ishimaru (Koji Kabuto), Keiichi Noda (Tetsuya Tsurugi), Akira Kamiya (Ryo Nagare), Junji Yamada (Hayato Jin), Joji Yanami (Dr. Umon / Dr. Yumi), Kosei Tomita (Dr. Saotome), Minori Matsushima (Sayaka Yumi), Rihoko Yoshida (Michiru Saotome), Yumi Nakatani (Jun Honô)

== See also ==
- UFO Robot Grendizer
- Getter Robo G
- Great Mazinger
