= Gaiking: Legend of Daiku-Maryu =

Japanese anime television series

- Screenshot of the series' title from the anime

ガイキング レジェンド オブ ダイクウマリュウ (Gaikingu: Legend of Daikū Maryū)
- Genre: Mecha
- Created by: MK Company
- Anime television series
- Directed by: Masahiro Hosoda
- Written by: Riku Sanjo
- Studio: Toei Animation
- Original network: TV Asahi
- Original run: November 12, 2005 – September 24, 2006
- Episodes: 39 (List of episodes)

Gaiking: Legend of Daiku-Maryu (Japanese: ガイキング レジェンド オブ ダイクウマリュウ, Hepburn: Gaikingu Rejendo Obu Daikū Maryū; lit. Gaiking: Legend of the Sky Devilsaur) is a Super Robot mecha anime series produced by Toei Animation. It is a re-imagining of the original series created by Toei Animation with Kunio Nakatani (Mitsuru Kaneko), Akio Sugino and Dan Kobayashi, and was aired in TV Asahi from November 12, 2005, to September 24, 2006, lasting a total of 39 episodes.

== Plot ==
Five years ago, Daiya Tsuwabuki was on a fishing trip with his father when giant monsters attacked. Daiya was saved by the crew of Daiku Maryu. In the present, he believes that his father is still alive, but no one believes him, not even his own mother. When the same monsters attack the city, Daiya becomes the pilot of Gaiking and joins Daiku Maryu as they go to the world of Darius to stop them from conquering the Earth.

== Origins ==
The "Gaiking Legend of Daiku Maryu" series was created to celebrate the 30th anniversary of the classic 1976 series and confirms the original creator as Mitsuru Kaneko, as evidenced by the opening credits of the Japanese theme song, which include the words "Original Idea: MK." This further confirms that "Daiku Maryu Gaiking" has always been an original work of Toei Animation.Today, it's common to read online that the series was created by Go Nagai, when in reality the facts about its origins are quite different. At the time, as we know from Seiichi Nishino (former president of Knack), Go Nagai had sued Toei for the foreign rights to Mazinger Z, and Toei therefore decided to no longer create animated works based on the drafts proposed by Go Nagai and Dynamic. Thus, "Daiku Maryu Gaiking" was born, with other original creators and an in-house Toei staff. Dynamic still tried to propose his idea for the robot but Toei chose Dan Kobayashi's idea, as they were having legal problems with Go Nagai for the rights to Mazinger Z. Dynamic Planning appears in the opening credits as a collaboration that refers to the proposal of some drawings of the Black Monsters and then breaks away from episode 23 onwards. Gaiking Legend of Daiku Maryu uses many references to the classic series but still creates a reboot series with a new story.

== Series differences ==
This version features a completely different story and main character, but some of the names are similar to the original series. Both Daikū Maryū and Gaiking have similar designs to the originals: Gaiking's torso is still skull shaped, the support machines come from Daikū Maryū. Gaiking also uses its Face Open attack in manner different from the original. Two of Daiku Maryu's weapons from the original series, Miracle Drill and Giant Cutter, are attached to Daichi Maryu and Tenkuu Maryu in this series. There are also differences in terms of location setting and Daiku-Maryu's ability to jump across both Earth and the Underground World from the use of the Dimensional Jump. Additionally, while Daiya has the same last name as Sanshiro (Tsuwabaki), the two characters are not related.

== Cast ==
- Daiya Tsuwabuki
  Mayumi Tanaka
- Sakon
  Hideyuki Tanaka
- Naoto Hayami
  Naomi Shindō
- Puria
  Reiko Kiuchi
- Daimon-jiisan
  Ryûzaburô Ôtomo
- Shizuka Fujiyama
  Satsuki Yukino
- Doctor Wan
  Shinji Nakae
- Jian Xin
  Takeshi Kusao
- Vice-captain Rosa
  Tomoe Hanba
- Lulu
  Tomoko Kawakami
- Captain Garis
  Tōru Ōkawa

== Songs ==
- "GAIKING" by Psychic Lover (OP, EP 39 Ending)
- "Boku ni dekiru koto" by Hideaki Tokunaga (ED1)
- "oh! my god" by Psychic Lover (ED2)

== Appearance in games ==
Gaiking: Legend of Daikū Maryū is included in the 2009 Super Robot Wars game, Super Robot Wars K for the Nintendo DS. It was hinted that the series' Dimensional Jump between Earth and the other world is the main focus of this game. The show is also featured in Super Robot Gakuen. In 2010, Gaiking was again featured in a Nintendo DS SRW game, Super Robot Wars L.

== See also ==
- Gaiking
