= Romance of the Three Kingdoms (2009 animation) =

Chinese-Japanese anime television series

三國演義
- Genre: Historical fiction
- Anime television series
- Directed by: Zhao Huayong
- Studio: Beijing Huihuang Animation Company; Future Planet; SEK Studio (subcontractor)
- Original network: CCTV, TV Tokyo
- Original run: 2009 – 2010
- Episodes: 52

Romance of the Three Kingdoms (Chinese: 三国演义 Sānguóyănyì; Japanese: 最強武将伝 三国演義 Saikyō bushō-den sangokuengi) is a 2009 animated television series based on the classic 14th century novel of the same name by Luo Guanzhong joint produced by the Beijing Huihuang Animation Company of China and Future Planet of Japan. It was broadcast in Japan starting April 2010. It contains 52 episodes in total.

== Production ==
This is a collaboration between Beijing Huihuang Animation, an animation production company under the umbrella of China Central Television (CCTV), and Future Planet Corporation, a Japanese video planning and production company. The production cost was 650 million yen. Takara Tomy releases figures for the Japan-China joint production of "Romance of the Three Kingdoms: The Strongest Generals". The production period was 25 months (although some articles claim it was four years), and a total of more than 2,000 staff members were involved in the production. A Japanese anime director provided the storyboard manuscript, and the Chinese side produced the animation. It was produced in the form of. In mainland China, the series began broadcasting on CCTV-8 (TV Drama Channel) in August 2009.

While many of the film adaptations of the Romance of the Three Kingdoms end with the Battle of Red Cliffs, this work depicts the unification of China by the Jin. For example, the first episode carefully depicts the events leading up to Diao Chan's adoption by Wang Yun, intertwined with the depiction of the turbulent times, while the story moves quickly from the Oath of the Peach Garden to the suppression of the Yellow Turban Rebellion and Zhang Fei's beating of the governor. While some episodes, such as the Battle of Red Cliffs, are depicted over several episodes, many episodes are omitted or shortened, and are done with narration. In the Japanese dubbed version, the characters are referred to by their surnames and given names, perhaps to prioritize clarity.

Takara Tomy, a major Japanese toy manufacturer, also invested 250 million yen into the production costs, and the company is importing and selling merchandise related to the series, such as figurines and card games. To commemorate HoriPro's 50th anniversary, a star-studded cast of voice actors will be cast in the "Sangoku Engi" series, in which heroes compete for supremacy, which will begin airing in April.

Future Planet, the Japanese production company, was already in financial trouble before the series aired, and was unable to pay the production costs it was supposed to cover, so it transferred the rights to the series that it held to another production company. The company dismissed all of its employees on July 31, 2010, and was filed for bankruptcy by its creditors on August 26. It received a decision to commence bankruptcy proceedings on September 29. The series cost ¥650 million (US$7.8 million).

== Japanese version ==
The series was exhibited at the 2009 Tokyo International Anime Fair in March 2009, and a promotional video was released in which the Chinese voices of characters such as Liu Bei, Guan Yu, and Zhang Fei were subtitled in Japanese.

In March 2010, it was officially decided that the Japanese version would be broadcast, and a press conference was held to announce the program. At the event, it was announced that the program would be called the "50th Anniversary Program of Horipro" in Japan, and that actors and talents affiliated with Horipro would be providing the voices and narration for the main characters, as well as about half of the characters appearing in the work.

With the broadcast of this work, the "Jewelpet (anime)|Jewelpet" series, which had been broadcast in this time slot as the successor to the "Onegai My Melody" series, was moved to a local sales slot produced by TV Tokyo. In addition, the nationally-broadcast anime program produced by TV Osaka|tvo in the same time slot, which had been running for about 13 years since "Magical Stage Fancy Lala", will end with this work, and will be on a 9-year hiatus until "Tomica Kizuna Gattai Earth Granner" starts in April 2020.

There is also a DVD version of this work, and a rental version was sold in all 13 volumes.

== Theme song ==
=== Chinese Version ===
Opening Song "A Handful of Country in Hand" (Earth Chapter)

Lyrics: Wu Xiaotian/Composer: Zhang Junpeng/Singer: Zhang Jia

Ending Song "Continuous Flow" (Water Chapter)

Lyrics: Wu Xiaotian/Composer: Ma Jun/Singer: Wu Wei

Opening Song "Dreams Are Burning" (Fire Chapter)

Lyrics: Wu Xiaotian/Composer: Ma Jun/Singer: Tang Zixing

Opening Song "Fighting" (Gold Chapter)

Lyrics: Wu Xiaotian/Composer: Ma Jun/Singer: Wang Qing

Ending Song "Four Seasons" (Wood Chapter)

Lyrics: Wu Xiaotian/Composer: Li Yongchang/Singer: Zeng Li

(Note: Hong Kong version opening theme "The Yangtze River Flows East" Lyrics: Chen Shihui/Composition: Yip Zhaozhong/Singer: Tang Jianwang)

=== Japanese version ===
Opening theme "风の会話"

Lyrics: Akuyuu/Composition: Suzuki Kisaburo/Arranger: Yamashita Kosuke/Singer: Sasaki Isao
Published by Columbia Music Entertainment

This song is a combination of lyrics from the collection of lyrics written by Akyuu before his death, "Shuki Shimoroshi Kameku" ("Book of Songs"), and the music. Ending theme of episodes 1-26 "Love is falling from the stars"

Lyrics: Iwasato Yuho/ Composition and arrangement: Sagisu Shiro/ Singer: May'n
Released by Flying DOG (Flying Dog)

Ending theme of episodes 27-52 "Yurali Yurala"

Lyrics, composition, arrangement, singing: Nakajima Takumi/ String arrangement: Kikutani Tomoki
Released by Zetima (ゼティマ)/UP-FRONT WORKS(アップフロントワークス)

== Related Products ==
=== DVD ===
- "Romance of the Three Kingdoms" Collector's Edition DVD (Published by China International Television Corporation, upper and lower parts 2-in-1, 10 discs, mpeg-2 pal letter box 16:9)
  - "Romance of the Three Kingdoms" Part 1 (DVD-5 1-26 episodes included) ISRC CN-A03-08-407-00/V.J9
  - "Romance of the Three Kingdoms" Part 2 (DVD-5 27-52 episodes included) ISRC CN-A03-09-356-00/V.J9
