= Force Five =

American adaptation of five anime television series

- Created by: Go Nagai (Note: Original creator of Starvengers and Grandizer.); Leiji Matsumoto (Note: Original creator of Danguard Ace and Spaceketeers.); Akio Sugino (Note: Original creator of Gaiking.)
- Based on: (see below)
- Written by: Collins Walker; Mike Haller; Lynn Garrison
- Directed by: Jim Terry; Collins Walker
- Music by: Shunsuke Kikuchi
- Countries of origin: United States; Japan (o.v.)
- No. of series: 5
- No. of episodes: 130 (286 in original versions)

Production
- Producer: Jim Terry
- Editor: Stewart Nelsen
- Running time: 23 minutes
- Production companies: Jim Terry Productions (Note: Former American Way.); Toei Animation

Original release
- Network: First-run syndication
- Release: September 8, 1980 – December 4, 1981

Force Five is an American adaptation of five different anime television series. In the United States, this series was primarily shown only in New England, Pennsylvania, and Virginia, though it did make brief appearances in other markets, such as Texas, and Northern California on KICU-TV 36. It was also shown in Toronto, Ontario, Canada on CFMT channel 47 and in Asia on Star Plus during the 1990s. It was produced by Jim Terry and his company American Way, and it consisted of five imported Japanese giant robot serials (originally produced in the mid-1970s by Toei Animation) in response to the popularity of the Shogun Warriors toy collection. Mattel was one of the sponsors of the series.

In an anthology style, the five shows were broadcast simultaneously with one episode of each serial assigned a specific weekday. Additionally, all of the shows were edited into two-hour films and marketed on video tape by Family Home Entertainment. In the UK, Krypton Force released several of these programmes but under different series titles.

== Force Five series ==
Force Five consisted of the following five series:

#	Series	No. of episodes	Adaptation of	No. of episodes
1	Force Five: Gaiking	26	Dino-Mech Gaiking (1976)	44
2	Force Five: Danguard Ace	26	Planetary Robot Danguard Ace (1977)	56
3	Force Five: Starvengers	26	Getter Robo G (1975)	39
4	Force Five: Grandizer	26	UFO Robot Grendizer (1975)	74
5	Force Five: Spaceketeers	26	Sci-Fi West Saga Starzinger (1978)	73

Originally, Great Mazinger was meant to be among the five shows, but at the last minute was swapped out for Starzinger.
