= Akio Sugino =

Japanese character designer (born 1944)

- 杉野 昭夫
- Born: September 19, 1944 (age 82); Sapporo, Hokkaido Japan
- Occupations: Animator, character designer, director
- Years active: 1963–present
- Employers: Mushi Production (1963–1972); Madhouse (1972–1980); Studio Annaparu (1980–198?) (Note: Founder and representative director until its closing in the late 1980s.); Tezuka Productions (1990?–present)

Akio Sugino (杉野 昭夫, Sugino Akio; born September 19, 1944) is a Japanese character designer who is known for working with Osamu Dezaki and his designs on Golgo 13 and Space Adventure Cobra.

== Filmography ==
- Astro Boy (1963)
- Kimba the White Lion (1965) – Character design
- Sabu to Ichi Torimono Hikae (1968) – Animation
- A Thousand and One Nights (1969) – Original pictures
- Ashita no Joe (1970)
- Aim for the Ace! (1973) – Design
- La Seine no Hoshi (1975) – Design
- Gaiking (1976) – Design and animation
- Manga Fairy Tales of the World (1976) – Animation
- Arrow Emblem Grand Prix no Taka (1977) – Design
- Jetter Mars (1977) – Design and animation
- 3D Animation: Child Without a Home (1977) – Character design
- Treasure Island (1978) – Animation
- Animation Kikō Marco Polo no Bōken (1979) – Design
- Botchan (1980) – Animation
- Tom Sawyer (1980) – Animation
- The Fantastic Adventures of Unico (1981) – Animation
- Space Adventure Cobra (1982) – Design and animation – also Space Adventure Cobra: The Movie (1982) and Cobra The Animation (2010)
- Cat's Eye (1983) – Character design
- Golgo 13: The Professional (1983)
- Oshin (1984) – Design
- Mighty Orbots (1985) – Design
- Nayuta (1986) – Design and animation
- They Were 11 (1986) – Design
- 2001 Nights (1987) – Design
- Clan of Pihyoro (1988) – Design and animation
- Sea's Darkness, Moon's Shadow (1988) – Animation
- The Story of Riki (1989) – Design
- Starlight Nocturne (1989) – Design and animation
- B.B. (Burning Blood) (1990) – Design and animation
- Sword for Truth (1990) – Design and animation
- Reporter Blues (1990) – Design
- Brother Dearest (1991) – Design and animation
- In the Beginning: The Bible Stories (1992) – Animation
- Black Jack (1993) – Design and animation
- First Tram in Hiroshima (1993) – Design and animation
- Hakugei: Legend of the Moby Dick (1997) – Screenplay
- Golgo 13: Queen Bee (1998) – Design
- Boku no Son Goku (2003) – Director
- Phoenix (2004) – Animation director
- Gin Tama (2005) – Animation
- The Snow Queen (2005) – Design
- Mokke (2007) – Animation
- Ultraviolet: Code 044 (2008) – Character design

== Bibliography ==
- Akio Sugino Drawings (1982) – ISBN 978-4061080645
- Hakugei Densetsu Artbook (1994) – ISBN 978-4881440636
