= Starzinger =

Japanese anime television series

- Sci-Fi West Saga Starzinger
- Cover of the first DVD volume

SF西遊記 スタージンガー (Esu Efu Saiyūki Sutājingā)
- Genre: Science fiction
- Created by: Leiji Matsumoto; Wu Cheng'en
- Anime television series
- Directed by: Yugo Serikawa
- Written by: Tatsuo Tamura
- Music by: Shunsuke Kikuchi
- Studio: Toei Animation
- Original network: Fuji TV
- Original run: April 2, 1978 – August 24, 1979
- Episodes: 73
- Manga
- Written by: Leiji Matsumoto
- Published by: Akita Shoten
- Magazine: Bōken Ō
- Original run: 1979 – 1980
- Volumes: 3
- Anime film
- Directed by: Tsunekiyo Otani
- Written by: Sukehiro Tomita
- Music by: Shunsuke Kikuchi
- Studio: Toei Animation
- Released: March 17, 1979
- Runtime: 25 minutes

Sci-Fi West Saga Starzinger (SF西遊記スタージンガー, Esu Efu Saiyūki Sutājingā), known as Spaceketeers in the United States, is an anime series produced by Toei Animation. It is a sci-fi remake/adaptation of Wu Cheng'en's fantasy novel Journey to the West. It was directed by Yugo Serikawa and written by Tatsuo Tamura. It aired in Fuji TV in Japan from April 2, 1978, to August 24, 1979. In the United States, it was referred to as Spaceketeers and was part of Jim Terry's Force Five series. In the United Kingdom, it was referred to as Sci-Bots on VHS releases. In Latin America, it was known as El Galáctico.

== Story ==
The story revolves around the Princess of the Moon, Aurora and her three cyborg companions (Kugo, Djorgo, and Hakka) who must travel to the Great King planet and restore the Galaxy Energy in the year 2072. The universe was becoming more and more unbalanced as the Queen of the Great Planet grows older. Their adventure includes battling the starmen who are transformed from the unbalanced minerals and planets.

== Concept ==
Starzinger was essentially a sci-fi space opera retelling of the 16th-century shenmo fantasy novel Journey to the West, a Chinese literary classic written by the Ming dynasty novelist Wu Cheng'en. The sci-fi twists were designed by Leiji Matsumoto based on the Terebi Magazine manga with art by Gosaku Ohta.

== Characters ==
| Japanese name | English name | Voiced by | Power | Vehicle | Description |
|---|---|---|---|---|---|
| Princess Aurora (オーロラ姫, Orora Hime) | Aurora | Kazuko Sugiyama | Telepathy & psychic abilities and can channel Galaxy energy. | | The only human among the main four characters. She is the last of the Moon people. Aurora is based on Tang Sanzang. |
| Jan Kugo (ジャン・クーゴ) | Jesse Dart | Hiroya Ishimaru | Wields an Astro-lance that changes size and shoots lasers; in the second season, he can become larger or smaller at will. | Starcrow | A red suited cyborg. Jesse became a cyborg to benefit and help humanity: demoted to menial jobs, he gained a bad temper. He is based on the monkey-demon, Sun Wukong, of which "Kugo" is an anagram. His English name is derived from D'Artagnan. |
| Sir Djorgo (サー・ジョーゴ, Sa Jogo) | Arimos | Kei Tomiyama | Wields a Laser-trident with freeze abilities; occasionally shot missiles from his shoulders. | Starcopper/Sea Wasp | A blue suited cyborg and the most intelligent of the three. When in doubt, he asks his portable computer (which often displays a TOEI logo while elaborating a problem). He is based on the water-demon, Sha Wujing, as Gojyo was the Japanese name of Wujing. His English name is derived from Aramis. |
| Don Hakka (ドン・ハッカ) | Porkos | Kousei Tomita | Swings a mace that turns into a flail and shoots rockets from his feet. | Starbood/Space Hog | A green suited cyborg, cheerful, hungry and the comedian. He is based on the pig-demon, Zhu Bajie, as Hakkai is the Japanese name of Bajie. His English name is derived from Porthos, but retains the pig-related pun of the original. |
| Prof. Kitty | Empress | Eiko Masuyama | | | A scientist, she reared Aurora after the death of Aurora's parents. Based on Guanyin. |
| Assistant Prof. Dodge | Prof. Schnitzel | Jouji Yanami | | | An intelligent professor, he made Kugo into the cyborg that he is. |
| Prince Gaima | | Keiichi Noda | | | Based on the son of the Bull Demon King, Red Boy. |
| Gingin Man & Kinkin Man | | Kenichi Ogata | | | Monster Brothers, based on King of Gold Horn & King of Silver Horn. |
| Beramis | | Noriko Ohara | Electronic sword | | A female cyborg. A captain of Queen Lacets, she later became a friend and ally of Jan Kugo. |
| Captain | | Satomi Majima | | | |
| King (キングギューマ, kingu gyuma) | | Takashi Tanaka | | | Based on the Bull Demon King. |
| Queen Lacets | | Yumi Nakatani, Nana Yamaguchi | | | Based on the Princess Iron Fan. |

== Production ==
The series was produced by Toei Animation. Production staff include:

- Directors: Yugo Seirikawa, Kozo Morishita, Kazumi Fukushima
- Creator: Leiji Matsumoto
- Screenwriters: Tatsuo Tamura, Mitsuru Majima, Sukehiro Tomita
- Character designs: Masami Suda
- Animators: Masami Suda, Satoshi Jinguu
- Music: Shunsuke Kikuchi

== Adaptations ==
In March 1979, a film was aired reusing footage from the first segment of the series. The film was more or less a summary.

The last nine episodes of the actual series was re-branded as "SF Saiyūki Starzinger II", though when shown outside Japan it was treated as one continuous series. It was never intended to be anything more than re-marketing of the last few episodes, since it was aired immediately after the first sixty-four episodes were shown in June 1979. The 65th episode began instantly in the following month with all the galactic energy restored in the storyline.

== Media ==
VHS cover of the U.S. version of the show.

A total of 73 episodes of the show were broadcast in Japan.

Starzinger was aired in the early 1980s in Latin America under the name of El Galáctico (The Galactic), as part of the four-series show "El festival de los robots", which translates to "The festival of the robots". The other shows were Steel Jeeg, Gaiking, and Magne Robo Gakeen. Only 47 episodes of the original 73 were dubbed and aired. This version of the series never reached their conclusion. The Spanish theme song of "El Galáctico" was composed and sung by Chilean singer Memo Aguirre (Capitán Memo). In 2008 the Chilean company SeriesTV released a set of 24 DVDs with Festival de los Robots episodes. This set includes 24 episodes of "El Galactico" with the original Spanish dubbing.

In North America, it was aired as "Spaceketeers" as part of the package show Force Five. As the Journey to the West story is not well known in the region, the characters were renamed to reference the Three Musketeers. To also fit into the Force Five time slot, the show had to be edit-squeezed into 26 episodes. The U.S. version puts them on a mission to the Dekos Star System, which contained evil powers changing peaceful creatures to evil mutants. The Force Five version not only just produced 26 episodes, but this English-language version of the series never reached their conclusion.

24 episodes of the original 73 were also released to home video in Scandinavia (mainly in Sweden) under the original name Starzinger. A listing of what episodes were cut out can be found at: Warfists Starzinger site in the episode section. The Swedish-language version of the series reached their conclusion.

=== Episode list ===
| No. | Title | Original release date |
|---|---|---|
| 1 | "Fly! Princess Aurora" "Tobe! Ōrora Hime" (飛ベ！オーロラ姫) | 2 April 1978 |
Professor Kitty tells Princess Aurora about the threat to the galaxy by the weakened energy from the Great King planet and asks her to undertake a dangerous mission to the centre of the galaxy, 30,000 light years away. Her companion and guard is to be the former rowdy Cyborg Jan Kugo, currently imprisoned on the Moon. She leaves in the Queen Cosmos space ship for the Moon, but is attacked by the pirates Space Roos. She lands on the Moon, but the pirates press their attack. Incensed, Jan Kugo swears to defend her and takes off in his space ship Star Crow and attacks them.
| 2 | "The Rowdiest Person in Space" "Uchū de ichiban no abarenbō" (宇宙で一番の暴れん坊) | 9 April 1978 |
Cyborg Jan Kugo defeats the pirates, but Princess Aurora criticises him for killing the pirates. She will only accept his aid if he agrees not to kill others, and departs. After talking to Professor Kitty and his creator Asst. Professor Dodge, Kugo agrees to escort and protect her. Meanwhile her ship is attacked by Torakiev, a yellow space sludge. Fortunately Kugo arrives and disperses it. He vows to accompany her, even if she disagrees. They land on a nearby asteroid to repair the ship, and he tells her about his transformation from a human to a cyborg and the reason for his antisocial behaviour. Suddenly, the Queen Cosmos is attacked by another spaceship.
| 3 | "I am a Man Too! For the Sake of the Princess!" "Ore mo otokoda! Hime no tame!" (おれも男だ! 姫のため!) | 16 April 1978 |
Kugo defends the Queen Cosmos from attack by another spaceship on a muddy asteroid, but they seem evenly matched and both retire to recover. Princess Aurora wants Kugo to ask the stranger to join them on their mission rather than continue a pointless fight. Professor Kitty had told her that she would find two more companions on her journey. Kugo searches for the other fighter who meanwhile gets on board the Queen Cosmos and introduces himself as Don Hakka. Aurora convinces him to join her mission. Kugo returns and joins Hakka to deflect some dangerous asteroids. The three then depart, and later land on a watery asteroid to get water. After they land, a figure emerges from the water.
| 4 | "Chasing After the Dream, The Adventurous Rascal!!" "Yume o motomeru, bōken yarō!!" (夢を求める,冒険野郎!!) | 23 April 1978 |
A figure emerges from the water in his space ship and attacks the Queen Cosmos. Aurora insists they talk rather than fight, and Hakka volunteers to talk to the stranger who introduces himself as Sir Djorgo. Hakka is unsuccessful, and so Kugo engages Sir Djorgo in battle. Meanwhile a large spaceship appears and releases hundreds of clam-type mutants from the army of Asari and Shijimi, intent on taking water from the asteroid. They recognise the Queen Cosmos and its mission and attempt to destroy it. Kugo breaks off his battle with Sir Djorgo to defend the Queen Cosmos. Sir Djorgo joins him to fight the mutual enemy, and the three cyborgs defeat the clam-type mutants. Sir Djorgo offers to join the mission as he calculates that no less than the three of them can succeed on the journey.
| 5 | "Shine on Your Heart! The Friendship Star" "Mune ni kagayake! Yūjō no hoshi" (胸に輝け!友情の星) | 30 April 1978 |
Princess Aurora and the three cyborgs in the Queen Cosmos are sucked onto a planet with a crystal palace. The queen abducts Aurora and traps her in the crystal palace. The three cyborgs cannot save her and Kugo returns to Earth where Professor Kitty gives him the Fire Ox weapon. He returns and defeats the crystal monster. Professor Kitty also sent three badges with the inscription, "Friendship is stronger than any weapons".
| 6 | "Astro-Pole, Strong Ally!" "Tsuyoi mikata no asutoro bō!" (強い味方のアストロ棒！) | 7 May 1978 |
The Queen Cosmos encounters a meteor shower. The Ship is attacked by a hoard of pirate Space Wasps. Kugo and Hakka go out to confront them, but Kugo defeats them even before Hakka arrives because his increased weight slows him down. A Space Wasp notifies their leader Denki that they have been defeated, and he sends the Destroyer Team. His fear is that if Princess Aurora revives the Great Planet, they will revert to lowly wasps again. Meanwhile Kugo and Hakka argue about their relative strength and Kugo tells the story of how he obtained his energy polymer Astro-Pole. The Space Wasps attack again in full force and the three cyborgs go to repel them. However Kugo destroys their hive to weaken them and prevent them from attacking other space ships.
| 7 | "The Manly Hakka's Great Action!" "Otoko Hakka no dai katsuyaku!" (男ハッカの大活躍!) | 14 May 1978 |
While Kugo and Hakka argue about who's the best fighter, the Queen Cosmos receives a SOS signal from the planet Tantar in the Zenpou star system. Princess Aurora sends Kugo and Hakka to investigate what should be a dead planet. They land and investigate some ruins, but are attacked by remote controlled robots. Kugo and his ship disappear, and he is captured by the Fierce Bat in his underground lair. Hakka, disguised in a robot shell, goes to the rescue Kugo and destroys the robot control panel. When the Fierce Bat leaves to attack the Queen Cosmos, Hakka goes in pursuit and destroys his ship, with the unseen assistance of Djorgo, but they let Hakka take the credit.
| 8 | "Nightmare Monster's Shocker Zone" "Akumu no baribarizōn" (悪夢のバリバリゾーン) | 21 May 1978 |
A group of spider monsters attempt to implement a "shocker plan" to prevent Princess Aurora and her crew from getting to The Great King planet. They create a colourful electronic cloud that distorts their perceptions and they begin fighting each other. Only Djorgo is not affected. He realises that he has 30 seconds periods to act without being effected by the light. It is up to him to save the others.
| 9 | "The Phantom Planet Has Disappeared" "Ma boroshi no hoshi wa kieta" (まぼろしの星は消えた) | 28 May 1978 |
The Queen Cosmos travels through dark space and the crew decide to land on the planet Espérance to rest. Kugo and Djorgo go to investigate if it is safe. They land and find the planet deserted and cities in ruins. They suspect it was caused by a large rock-like fossil monster and attack it, finally destroying it. Princess Aurora lands in the Queen Cosmos and realises that the dream planet is no longer the planet of natural beauty and hope. As she is walking, she disappears.
| 10 | "The Planet Called Hope" "Kibō to iu na no hoshi" (希望という名の星) | 4 June 1978 |
The three cyborgs go searching for the missing Princess Aurora. Djorgo deduces that she was teleported elsewhere. They find an installation below the surface and investigate. They encounter a mysterious figure, Ben, who asks them to kill all of the fossil monsters in exchange for freeing the princess. They agree, and attack and kill the monsters, The princess meets her captor, Princess Nova of the Espérance Kingdom. She wants to make Aurora her slave out of jealousy of her beauty, but Ben has promised her freedom in exchange for destruction of the fossil monsters and decides to free her. Princess Nova attacks the Queen Cosmos and Ben is wounded by cannon fire. She is distraught and runs to him. Ben is alive, and joins hands with Princess Nova and Princess Aurora and vows to live until Espérance is returned to its former beauty.

== Home media ==
=== VHS ===
United Kingdom:

| Release name | Release date | Classifaction | Publisher | Format | Language | Subtitles | Notes | REF |
|---|---|---|---|---|---|---|---|---|
| SCI-BOTS 1 Conflict | July 7, 1987 | U | Krypton Force Ltd. | PAL | English | None | Run time: 56 min. | |
| SCI-BOTS 2 Strike Back | July 16, 1987 | U | Krypton Force Ltd. | PAL | English | None | Run time: 46 min. | |
| SCI-BOTS 3 Battle of the Flame Dragon | April 28, 1988 | U | Krypton Force Ltd. | PAL | English | None | Run time: 43 min. | |
| SCI-BOTS 4 Betrayal | 1988 | U | Krypton Force Ltd. | PAL | English | None | Run time: 43 min. | |
| SCI-BOTS 5 Death Valley | April 28, 1988 | U | Krypton Force Ltd. | PAL | English | None | Run time: 43 min. | |
| SCI-BOTS 6 Love and Treasure | April 18, 1988 | U | Krypton Force Ltd. | PAL | English | None | Run time: 43 min. | |
| SCI-BOTS 7 Zalo | April 28, 1988 | U | Krypton Force Ltd. | PAL | English | None | Run time: 43 min. | |
| SCI-BOTS 8 Evil Catyla | April 18, 1988 | U | Krypton Force Ltd. | PAL | English | None | Run time: 43 min. | |
| SCI-BOTS 9 Surrender by Force | April 18, 1988 | U | Krypton Force Ltd. | PAL | English | None | Run time: 43 min. | |
| SCI-BOTS 10 Snark and the Diamond | April 18, 1988 | U | Krypton Force Ltd. | PAL | English | None | Run time: 43 min. | |
| SCI-BOTS 11 Star Point Tantar | April 29, 1988 | U | Krypton Force Ltd. | PAL | English | None | Run time: 43 min. | |
| SCI-BOTS 12 Crystal and the Space Bees | July 14, 1988 | U | Krypton Force Ltd. | PAL | English | None | Run time: 43 min. | |
| SCI-BOTS 13 Dector the Betrayer | July 14, 1988 | U | Krypton Force Ltd. | PAL | English | None | Run time: 43 min. | |
| SCI-BOTS THE MOVIE | July 14, 1988 | U | Krypton Force Ltd. | PAL | English | None | | |

=== DVD ===
Japan: On 25 January 2008 TOHO released a six disc DVD box-set.

Latin America: On 28 July 2008 SeriesTv released "El Festival de los Robots" onto DVD.

USA: On 20 August 2013 Shout! Factory released "Starzinger: The Movie Collection" onto DVD.
