= Getter Robo G =

Japanese anime television series

- Title card
- ゲッターロボG
- Genre: Mecha
- Creators: Go Nagai; Ken Ishikawa; Dynamic Production
- Director: Osamu Kasai
- Music: Shunsuke Kikuchi
- Country of origin: Japan
- Original language: Japanese
- No. of episodes: 39

Production
- Fuji Television; Toei Animation

Original release
- Network: FNS (Fuji TV)
- Release: May 15, 1975 – March 25, 1976

Related
- Great Mazinger vs. Getter Robo G: The Great Sky Clash; Grendizer, Getter Robo G and Great Mazinger: Decisive Showdown! The Giant Sea Beast

Getter Robo G (ゲッターロボG, Gettā Robo Jī), known as Starvengers in the United States, is a super robot anime series by Toei Animation based on Hundred Demons Empire arc of Getter Robo manga by Go Nagai and Ken Ishikawa. This direct sequel to Getter Robo was broadcast on Fuji TV from May 15, 1975, to March 25, 1976, with a total of 39 episodes (some episodes were rebroadcast, erroneously giving the impression that there were 43 episodes).

Mattel's popular Shogun Warriors toy collection included Getter Robo G's robot formations in that toy line: Getter Dragon (Dragun), Getter Liger (Raider), and Getter Poseidon (Poseidon). As a result of the popularity of these toys in the US, Jim Terry included this series in his Force Five anime lineup under the title of Starvengers. Some Starvengers episodes were re-dubbed and released by FB Productions under the Robo Formers title. The original Getter Robo series, however, has yet to appear in the US (although the Shin Getter Robo OVAs have appeared). In the UK, Starvengers episodes were released on video by Krypton Force under the name Formators.

== Plot ==
After the final defeat of the Dinosaur Empire and the death of Musashi Tomoe in the original Getter Robo series, Dr. Saotome (Dr. Copernicus in Starvengers), creator of Getter Robo, fears that the peace the Getter Robo team has won will be short lived and that even greater enemies will appear. Dr. Saotome's fears are justified when the Hundred Demon Empire (Hyakki Teikoku, also known as the Pandemonium Empire in Starvengers) appears. Composed of horned, devil-like alien humanoids and possessing a technology advanced enough to build giant demonic robots, this militaristic organization intends to steal Saotome's Getter Generator to fulfill their own goals of world domination.

However, Dr. Saotome is prepared with the creation of an even more powerful Getter Robo, Getter Robo G and a new Getter Robo base. Also, with Musashi dead, Dr. Saotome needs a third pilot, which he finds in baseball player Benkei Kuruma.

== Getter Machines ==
Like its predecessor, Getter Robo G is composed of three jet-like vehicles piloted by one of the three pilots. Dragon is the red jet, controlled by the pilot of Getter Dragon. Liger, the blue jet, is used by Getter Liger's pilot. Getter Poseidon's operator uses Poseidon, the yellow machine. All three are armed with missiles but are generally very weak and never used in combat unless absolutely necessary. They also appear when the pilots use the Open Get (Break Formation in the English version) verbal command to break up the current form, so that they can change into another, or so they can dodge an enemy's attack.

- Getter Dragon (formed from Dragon+Liger+Poseidon) - English Version - Star Dragon - piloted by Ryoma Nagare, English version - Homer Winthrow
- Getter Liger (formed from Liger+Poseidon+Dragon) - English version - Star Arrow - piloted by Hayato Jin, but piloted by Michiru when Hayato is captured near the end. English version - Paladin Spencer
- Getter Poseidon (formed from Poseidon+Dragon+Liger) - English version - Star Poseidon - piloted by Benkei Kuruma, English version - Elmer O. Fossil aka "Foul Tip"

== Mecha Oni ==
Mecha Oni are the monsters of the week that appear much like the mechasauruses in the first series. It is stated and proven in a few episodes that destroying their horns will critically weaken, if not destroy, a Mecha Oni. Most Mecha Oni take up the likeness of their pilots, primarily in the head, with a few exceptions.
