= Dino Mech Gaiking =

Japanese anime television series

- Title card

大空魔竜ガイキング (Daikū Maryū Gaiking)
- Genre: Mecha, adventure
- Created by: Akio Sugino; Kunio Nakatani; Dan Kobayashi; Dynamic Planning (Note: It was only credited in the first 22 episodes.)
- Anime television series
- Directed by: Tomoharu Katsumata
- Written by: Sōji Yoshikawa
- Music by: Shunsuke Kikuchi
- Studio: Toei Animation
- Licensed by: NA: Discotek Media
- Original network: FNS (Fuji TV)
- Original run: 1 April 1976 – 27 January 1977
- Episodes: 44

Gaiking (大空魔竜ガイキング, Daikū Maryū Gaikingu; lit. Sky Devilsaur Gaiking (Note: Maryū (魔竜) when literally translated, without context, means "Demon Dragon", but is actually a portmanteau of the Japanese words majin (魔神, "devil") and kyōryū (恐竜, "dinosaur"). In English, this roughly translates into "Devilsaur".)) is a Japanese Super Robot mecha anime series produced by Toei Animation. For distribution purposes, Toei refers to this television series as Dino Mech Gaiking.

It ran from April 1976 through January 1977 and consisted of 44 episodes of 25 minutes each. Gaiking was notable for being one of the few super robot series to take place in real places outside Japan, and for being the first Super Robot series to have a mobile carrier for the chief robots. In the US, Gaiking was part of Mattel's popular Shogun Warriors import toy line of the late 1970s and Jim Terry's Force Five anthology series. In 2005, a re-imagining titled Gaiking: Legend of Daiku-Maryu was produced.

== Plot ==
The story chronicled the battle between the crew of the semi-transformable carrier Daikū Maryū (Note: Also called the Kargosaur in the Shogun Warriors toyline, and also known as the Great Space Dragon in the US English dub. Other possible translations are Sky Devilsaur, Mechasaur and Dino-Mech.) and the Super Robot Gaiking invented by Dr. Daimonji (Note: Known as Professor Hightech in the English-language version of the show.) against an invading race of aliens called the Dark Horror Army. This army hails from the planet Zela whose home planet is facing destruction by their star, Sigma, turning into a black hole as their population starts to become extinct. Notable aspects of the series include the dinosaur-based designs of the Daikū Maryū and its support machines and the use of part of the carrier to form the main robot. The robot Gaiking was piloted by former baseball star named Sanshiro Tsuwabuki (Note: Known as Aries Astonopolis in the English-language version of the show.) who was drafted for the job because his latent psychic powers made him the only one capable of doing so, all other similarly empowered candidates having been assassinated by alien agents with he himself having been injured in an attack that ended his sports career. Gaiking is most easily distinguished from other mecha by its skull-shaped golden torso formed from the head of the Daikū Maryū and its golden horns.

The leader of the Dark Horror Army was a robot scientist named Darius The Great and all of their ships and mecha were fish-shaped, which most likely inspired the Darius series of video games. He uses four giant robotic leaders called the Death Cross Generals composed of Dr. Dankel, General Asimov, General Killer, and General Desmont. These generals used bomber-like spaceships called Grotectors to create artificial black hole vortexes to travel to Earth and back. Throughout the series the Death Cross Generals and Darius note that natives of Zela originally came to Earth for research purposes before slowly colonizing the planet and using it to hide various dark monsters with the rise of humanity, as far back as one million years before the start of the series until the twelfth century AD. For their military natives of Zela were brainwashed and genetically altered into birdmen called the dark avians with elite individuals becoming dark knights.

== Mecha ==
Gaiking

=== Gaiking ===
A mecha defender robot consisting of three separate components: the Dino-Mecha's head, an arm unit, and a leg unit (the arm and leg units are stored inside the Dino-Mecha and exit from a gateway located below the Dragon's head). These three launch from the Dino-Mecha and combine, while in flight, to form Gaiking. Dino-Mecha's head forms Gaiking's core (i.e., chest and back) and contains Gaiking's own head. Gaiking is operated by baseball star Sanshiro Tsuwabuki.

=== Daikū Maryū / Dino-Mech ===
A gigantic dragon-shaped robot that defends Earth from invaders from the planet Zela. It possesses numerous weapons and houses the sections of the Gaiking robot. Both Gaiking and the Daiku Maryu are composed of the super alloy Zolmanium Steel which was later reinforced with iron deposits from the Moon.

=== Nessar ===
A small tank-like robot resembling a Plesiosaur, Nessar (Note: Known as Dynatar in the English-language version of the show.) is used for scouting missions in water. Its weaponry includes lasers emitting from its eyes, a flamethrower emitting from its mouth, and three mortar cannons located on its chest.

=== Skylar ===
A small jet-like robot resembling a Pteranodon, Skylar is used for scouting missions in the air. Its weaponry includes machine guns and missiles.

=== Bazolar ===
A small, but very fast, tank-like robot resembling a Triceratops, Bazolar (Note: Known as Rhinatar in the English-language version of the show.) is used for scouting missions on land. Its weaponry includes laser canons, a drill, and a mortar cannon.

== Dark monsters ==
- Black Monster: Appears in episodes 1 and 2. Powers include a storm cloud that emits lightning and cyclones called the Cosmic Spectrum, eye electric bolts and energy beams, levitation, can reflect energy beams from the forehead eye, and mouth flames. Reappears in Shin Super Robot Wars, Super Robot Wars Alpha 2, and Super Robot Wars Alpha 3.
- Gantarooru: Appears in episode 3. Powers include flight, eye energy rings, and mouth flames.
- Fire Bird: Appears in episode 4. Powers include heat resistance, flight, and body flames.
- Baragos: Appears in episode 5. Powers include a heat resistance force field, flight, underside bombs, swimming, twin missile launchers in the back, a whip tail, mouth flames and frost, and a head pincer.
- King Snake: Appears in episode 6. Powers include swimming, coiling, and mouth flames.
- Ra Mu: Appears in episode 6. Powers include hypnotic eye lasers, a statue disguise, fusing with King Snake, and a sword.
- Sharkron: Appears in episode 7. Powers include swimming, reinforced teeth, controlling sharks, eye energy beams, head crest electric bolts, mouth flames that can be used underwater, and launchable tail spikes.
- Octopuzaur: Appears in episode 8. Powers include flight, two tentacles each armed with a pair of whips, and mouth flames and smoke.
- Jaguar: Appears in episode 9. Powers include flight, mouth flames
- Sal Gata: Appears in episode 9. Only known power is flight.
- Konchu Gata: Appears in episode 9. Only known power is lasers from the back horn.
- Tori Gata: Appears in episode 9. Powers include flight and lasers from the neck horns.
- Tokage Gata: Appears in episode 9. Powers include flight, eye energy beams, and mouth energy rings.
- Doon-Raifuun: Appears in episode 10. Powers include flight, eye electric bolts, and mouth missiles.
- Oozora Maryu: Appears in episode 11. Powers include flight, a magic fire ball cannon from the mouth, and a retractable forehead blade.
- Gigant: Appears in episode 12. Powers include flight, mouth fire balls, a spear tail, reinforced fangs, and self destructing.
- Demon of The Desert: Appears in episodes 13 and 14. Powers include burrowing, flight, and invulnerability powered by the original Sasoringer.
- Sasoringer: Appears in episodes 13 and 14. Powers include burrowing, twin pincer claws, a drill tail that fires hot energy bolts, and swimming. Reappears in Shin Super Robot Wars, Super Robot Wars Alpha 2, and Super Robot Wars Alpha 3.
- Gantalos: Appears in episode 15. Powers include a bouncing energy ball bazooka and flight.
- Fake Gaikings: Appear in episode 15. Powers include flight, the Counter Punch, the Back Shredder, and the Saur Geyser.
- Ice Killer: Appears in episode 16. Powers include flight, a freezing liquid from the mouth called the Nuclear Freezer, and mandibles.
- Angyoler: Appears in episode 17. Powers include a stone disguise, swimming, mouth suction that can create giant whirlpools, head torpedoes, reinforced teeth, and flight.
- Mammoth Noah: Appears in episode 18. Powers include a pair of harpoon-like tusks, an extendable trunk that emits electric surges, gusts from the trunk, and eye lasers.
- Kaikon: Appears in episode 19. Powers include flight, coiling, and three gold web shooters for the mouth.
- Keroger: Appears in episode 20. Powers include a statue disguise, mouth flames and homing missiles, high jumping, eye electric beams, and a magnetic field in the abdomen.
- Devil Jaguar: Appears in episode 21. Powers include mouth flames, flight, sharp teeth and claws, an ensnaring tail, and a pair of pendulum blades on the body called the Ring Saturn. Reappears in Shin Super Robot Wars and Super Robot Wars Alpha 2.
- Kabutonga: Appears in episodes 22 and 23. Powers include a pincer horn that fires magnetic bolts, a drill missile on the rear, reformation, wall crawling, and burrowing. Reappears in Shin Super Robot Wars, Super Robot Wars Alpha 2, and Super Robot Wars Alpha 3.
- Moon Condor: Appears in episodes 22 and 23. Powers include flight, holograms from the eyes, talons sharp enough to tear through zolmanium, fire resistance, bladed wings, and missiles from an unknown part of the body. Reappears in Shin Super Robot Wars, Super Robot Wars Alpha 2, and Super Robot Wars Alpha 3.
- Moai Robots: Powers include eye lasers, axes, and spears.
- Oronga: Appears in episode 24. Powers include heat resistance, mouth flames, a thick turtle shell with retractable spikes, and high jumping.
- The Gokibular: Appears in episode 25. Powers include flight, mandibles, burrowing, dual whip antennae that absorb or rechannel electricity and fire lasers, and a mouth spike.
- Gorgon: Appears in episode 26. Powers include traveling in a meteor, a pair of dragon-like heads that emit mouth flames, mouth cyclones, eye lasers, and erecting an extremely tough metal wall.
- Yadokari: Appears in episode 27. Powers include swimming, flight, trail coiling to form a nautilus shell, six face tentacles, and mouth torpedoes.
- Spideros: Appears in episode 28. Powers include flight and strong jaws.
- Neokong: Appears in episode 29. Powers include a statue disguise, size changing, dividing into two bodies, green mouth flames, a pair of combinable pendulum blade staffs in the shoulders that work like a boomerang, and flight.
- Saur Mons: Appears in episode 30. Powers include swimming, energy bolts from the back spikes, a whip-like tail, and sharp teeth.
- Double Eagle: Appears in episode 31. Powers include flight, highly explosive eye lasers from both heads, talons, and twin beaks. Unlike other dark monsters it originated from Earth and was rejected by the United Nations in favor of the Daiku Maryu.
- Shiro Kujira: Appears in episode 32. Powers include swimming and reinforced armor.
- Great Demon Himilar: Appears in episode 33. Powers include a short sword, a shield on the left wrist that deflects fire, intangibility, teleportation, and an entrapping barrier from the eyes.
- Blood Buffalo: Appears in episode 34. Powers include flight, twin head horns, burrowing, reinforced armor, and a whip tail. Unlike other dark monsters it is not a member of the Dark Horror Army, rather a space conqueror named Wilder.
- Satan Ant: Appears in episode 35. Powers include burrowing, mouth acid spray, reformation, flight, and eye energy beams.
- Golden Leo: Appears in episode 36. Powers include a lion form, man flames that can overpower the Death Fire, fangs, claws, and fire absorption.
- Haniwa Dolls: Appear in episode 37. Powers include javelins that fire lasers and a telekinetic beam from the eyes.
- Inodoler: Appears in episode 37. Powers include swimming, flight, and tusk missiles from the mouth.
- Moll: Appears in episode 38. Powers include traveling in a fire ball, strength, and pectoral missiles.
- Takomander: Appears in episode 39. Powers include swimming, extendable octopus tentacles, and acidic ink from the mouth.
- Gasroid: Appears in episode 40. Powers include emitting an acidic gas from the mouth, and a whip tail.
- King Cobra: Appears in episode 41. Powers include photo absorption to grow, venomous fangs, mouth flames and lasers, flight, and a rubbery body.
- Nessie Q: Appears in episode 42. Powers include swimming, fangs, a whip tail, a 3-tube missile launcher in the base of the neck, launchable hook spikes at the base of the tail.
- Kamakirin: Appears in episode 43. Powers include a scythe claw for each hand, eye energy beams, and flight. Unlike other dark monsters it was constructed on Mars.
- Ganimont: Appears in episodes 43 and 44. Powers include swimming, extendable pincer claw hands, acidic mouth foam, flight, and a machine gun in each eye. Unlike other dark monsters it was constructed on Mars.
- Dragonder: Appears in episodes 43 and 44. Powers include burrowing, mouth flames, flight, and eye lasers that summon lightning. Unlike other dark monsters it was constructed on Mars.

== Cast ==
- Sanshirō Tsuwabuki (石蕗三四郎 (also ツワブキ・サンシロー))
  Akira Kamiya
- Doctor Daimonji (大文字博士)
  Hidekatsu Shibata
- Fan Li
  Kan Tokumaru
- Gen Sakon (左近元)
  Shunji Yamada
- Bunta Hayami (速水文太)
  Kenichi Ogata
- Peter Richardson
  Makio Inoue
- Midori Fujiyama (藤山みどり)
  Mami Koyama
- Yamagakake (山ヶ岳)
  Osamu Kato
- Hachirō (八郎)
  Noriko Tsukase
- Erica
  Noriko Ohara

== Production and release notes ==
Gaiking was Toei Animation's first super robot series not based on an existing manga (the company's previous super robot anime Mazinger Z, Getter Robo, etc. were based on manga series by manga artists and writers Go Nagai and Ken Ishikawa respectively).

The program was shown in English internationally as part of Jim Terry's Force Five lineup, and was also broadcast in Latin America as El Gladiador as part of a 4 anime mecha show called El Festival de los Robots (with the other 3 being Starzinger, Magne Robo Gakeen and Kotetsu Jeeg, known as El Galactico, Supermagnetron and El Vengador, respectively). The Jim Terry dub was released on video in the UK by Krypton Force under the name The Protectors, though the first volume of their Formators series actually contained Gaiking episodes instead of episodes from Jim Terry's Starvengers. Another dub was produced in the late-70s by M&M Productions in Hawaii, who also dubbed Mazinger Z for Toei as a potential test for a US release. Isao Sasaki did the English versions of opening and ending songs for this dub. Of this dub, only the eleventh episode survives.

The first 26 episodes of Gaiking were also aired in Italy during the Japanese super robot craze of the late 70s/early 80s, under the name Gaiking. In the late 1990s the whole series was released in Italy in dubbed DVD boxes. Two episodes from Jim Terry's Force Five Gaiking series would be redubbed as an episode of Robo Formers.

Discotek Media acquired the rights for the entire television series and released it in a complete box set, in Japanese with English subtitles, in June 2016. Reception for the release was mostly positive, but was noted for minor translation issues with the word Ankoku, most notably renaming the Dark Horror Army and Dark Monsters to Black Horror Army and Black Monsters, respectively.

In 2009, William Winckler Productions produced three all-new English dubbed film versions edited from the original series. William Winckler, known for Tekkaman the Space Knight, wrote, produced and directed the English films, which are seen on broadband in Japan and released on DVD in North America by Shout! Factory in 2013.

== Legal controversy ==
The Daiku Maryu Gaiking series was born as Toei Animation's first original robot anime. Before that, robot anime produced by Toei Animation were based on drafts and ideas provided by Go Nagai and his company Dynamic Productions (Dynamic Planning), but Daiku Maryu Gaiking was born as a project from scratch without a reference manga. The first proposal was made by Toei, who hired Takeshi Tamiya to develop a draft and select the production staff. The draft of the story thought by Kunio Nakatani, pseudonym of Mitsuru Kaneko, who was recognized by Toei as the original author of the series, for the character design was chosen from Akio Sugino's ideas, and the mecha design from Dan Kobayashi's ideas. Dynamic Planning appears in the opening credits of the Japanese opening credits for the first twenty-two episodes of the series as a collaboration for the creation of some drawings of the Black Monsters. It is said that Dynamic also proposed his idea for the Gaiking robot but Toei instead chose the idea of another member of the Toei staff (Dan Kobayashi). The collaboration ended from episode 23 onwards of the series and it is revealed that the problems between Go Nagai and Toei Animation were mainly related to the dispute over the foreign rights of Mazinger Z. This led to the departure of Go Nagai and Dynamic from Toei towards other companies such as Knack. At Napoli Comicon 2007, to a question from the public about Gaiking, Go Nagai replied that the question posed would raise several problems with Toei Animation and from which Go Nagai now feels detached as he no longer believes the idea is his (by virtue of the choices made by Toei) (full transcript of the interview). There are several manga versions of the Daiku Maryu Gaiking anime created by Megumu Matsumoto (Akira Oze), Yuji Hosoi, Takeshi Koshiro, Yoshihiro Morito and Yuzo Matsumoto which tell alternative versions of the events narrated in the television series. In 2005 a reboot series was created entitled Gaiking - Legend of Daiku-Maryu. (abbreviated as “Gaiking LOD”) which pays homage to the classic 1976 series with references and homages but still telling a new story. In the opening credits of the Gaiking LOD series we once again find Mitsuru Kaneko (MK Co.) confirmed as the original author. A computer graphics film based on the series was announced but unfortunately it was never made.

== Game appearances ==
The original Gaiking first appeared in Shin Super Robot Wars for the PlayStation and later in 2nd Super Robot Wars Alpha and 3rd Super Robot Wars Alpha, both for the PlayStation 2.

== Hollywood remake ==
A live-action film based on the series, entitled Gaiking, was announced at the 2010 Tokyo Animation Fair and was to be helmed by American filmmakers Jules Urbach and Matthew Gratzner, who created the trailer for the film's public reveal. In 2012 Toei was teaming with The Walking Dead producer Valhalla Entertainment for the live-action adaptation of the show, but no further developments since then have been noted.
