= K-Books =

Japanese used goods chain

K-Books ケイ・ブックス
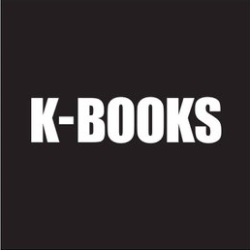
- Company type: Private
- Industry: Retail
- Founded: 1992 (founded); 1994 (incorporated)
- Headquarters: Toshima, Tokyo, Japan
- Products: Used goods (otaku and hobbyist-related items)

K-Books (Japanese: ケイ・ブックス) is a chain of used goods stores in Japan. It specializes in otaku- and hobbyist-related items, including anime goods, manga, dōjinshi (self-published works), and voice actor and idol goods.

== History ==
K-Books was founded in 1992 originally as "Kenchan no manga juku 1gouten" (けんちゃんのマンガ塾1号店), a secondhand manga store located in Sugamo, Toshima, Tokyo. It opened a second location in Sugamo in 1994, and was incorporated and rebranded as K-Books that same year. Locations were opened in the Tokyo neighborhoods of Kichijoji, Ikebukuro, and Akihabara in the mid- to late 1990s. Its first locations outside of Tokyo were opened in Osaka in 2002, and Nagoya in 2017.

In February 2019, K-Books ceased consignment sales for dōjinshi at its dōjin store in Ikebukuro after 15 years.

== Products ==
K-Books sells variety of secondhand otaku and Japanese pop culture goods, including dōjinshi (self-published works), manga, novels, dolls, cosplay items, anime and video game goods, as well as voice actor and idol goods. Several K-Books locations specialize in specific kinds of goods or genres, including yaoi, Vocaloid, and 2.5D musicals.

In addition to its retail business, K-Books operates several cosplay restaurants and bars: Ikemofu, a costumed animal café; Swallowtail, a butler café; and Bar Blue Moon, a nighttime bar operated by the butlers of Swallowtail. It also operates Atis Collection, a yaoi audio drama production label.

== Major locations ==
K-Books Akihabara Hon-kan is located at Akihabara in the Akihabara Radio Kaikan building. It specializes in items aimed at men, such as moe and Virtual YouTuber goods. K-Books Chara-kan is located in Chiyoda and specializes in goods from Weekly Shōnen Jump media properties, such as My Hero Academia and Demon Slayer. K-Books Ikebukuro Doujin-kan is located in Ikebukuro on Otome Road, and specializes in boys' love-related items.

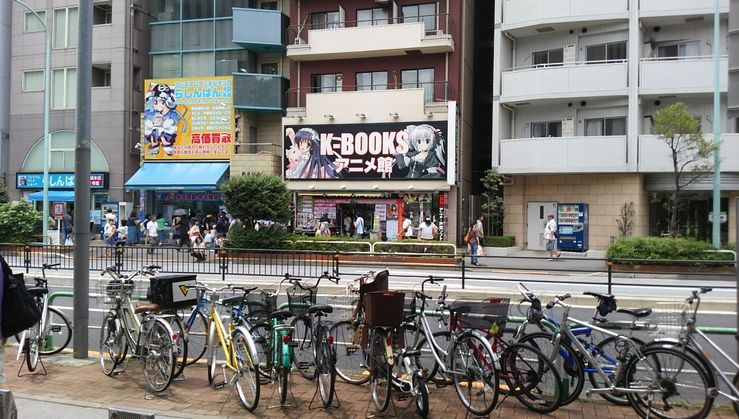
K-Books Ikebukuro Anime Hall in Ikebukuro, Tokyo.

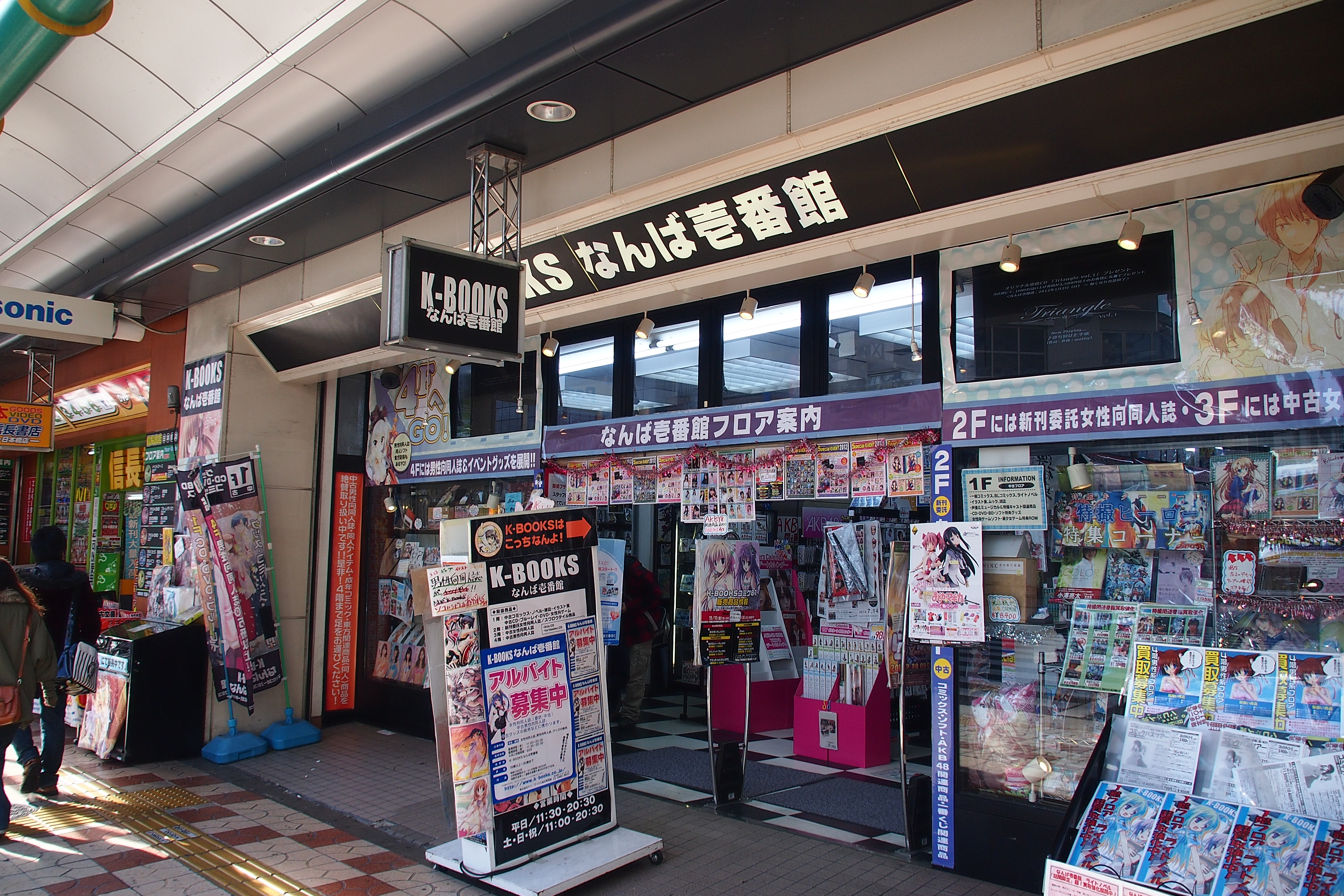
Exterior of K-Books in Nipponbashi, Osaka.

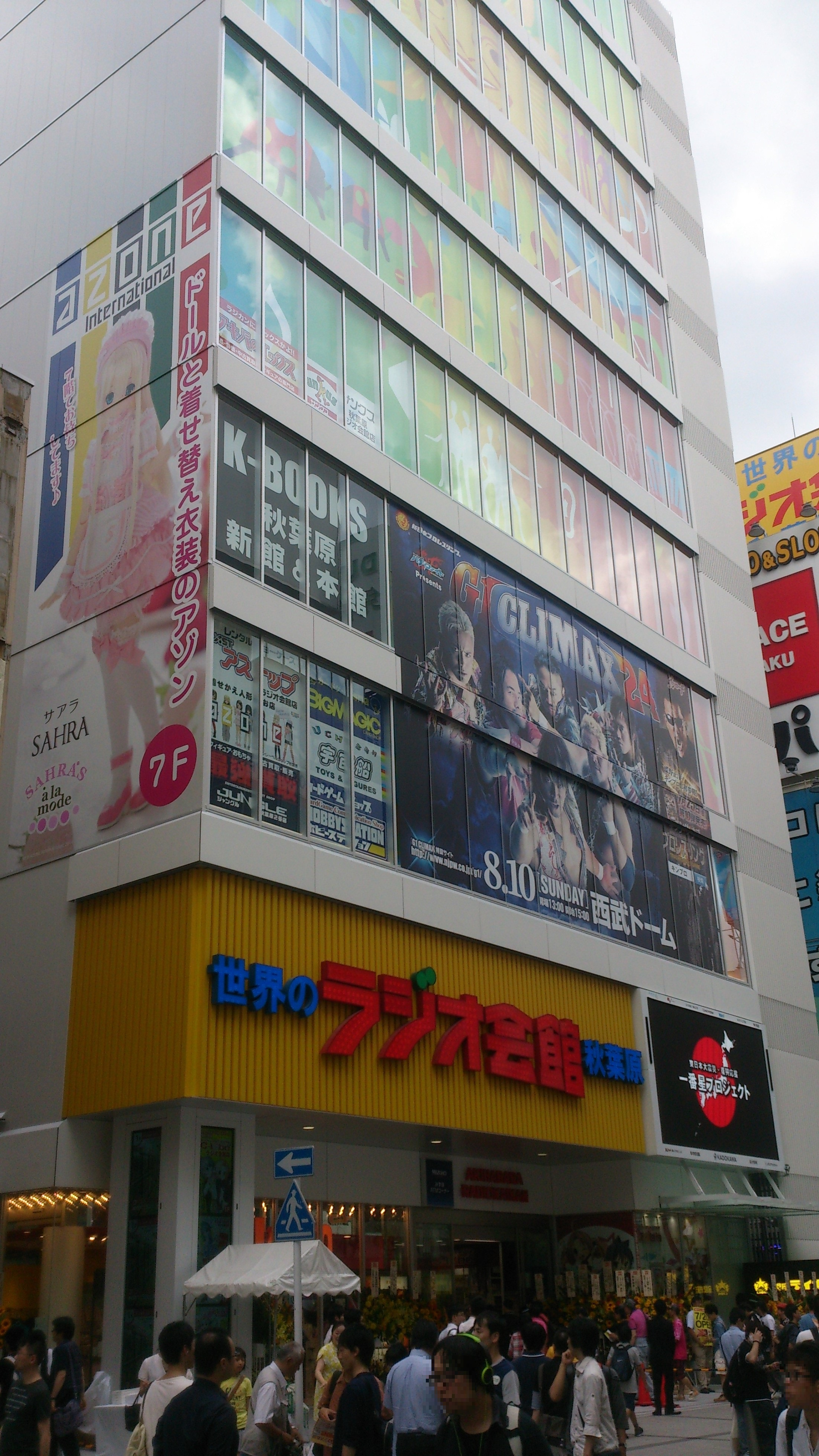
Radio Kaikan in Akihabara, Tokyo, with K-Books visible on the fourth floor.

== See also ==
- Animate
- Book Off
- Comic Toranoana
- Comic Takaoka
- Mandarake
