= Mandarake =

Japanese used goods store chain

Mandarake Inc.
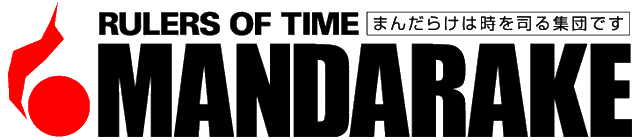
- Company type: Public (TYO: 2652)
- Industry: Retail
- Founded: 1980
- Headquarters: Tokyo, Japan
- Key people: Masuzo Furukawa, President
- Revenue: ▲¥9.8 billion (FY 2018)
- Net income: ▲¥425 million (FY 2018)
- Number of employees: 168
- Website: www.mandarake.co.jp

Mandarake Inc. (Japanese: まんだらけ) is a Japanese retail corporation that operates a chain of used good stores. Founded as a used bookstore specializing in manga in 1980, Mandarake incorporated in 1987 and currently operates 11 retail locations and one fulfillment center. The company focuses on the purchase and sale of a wide range of collectables and otaku-related goods, including anime- and manga-related items, DVDs, CDs, toys, figurines, trading cards, video games, cosplay items, animation cels, and dōjinshi (self-published works).

== Overview ==
=== History ===
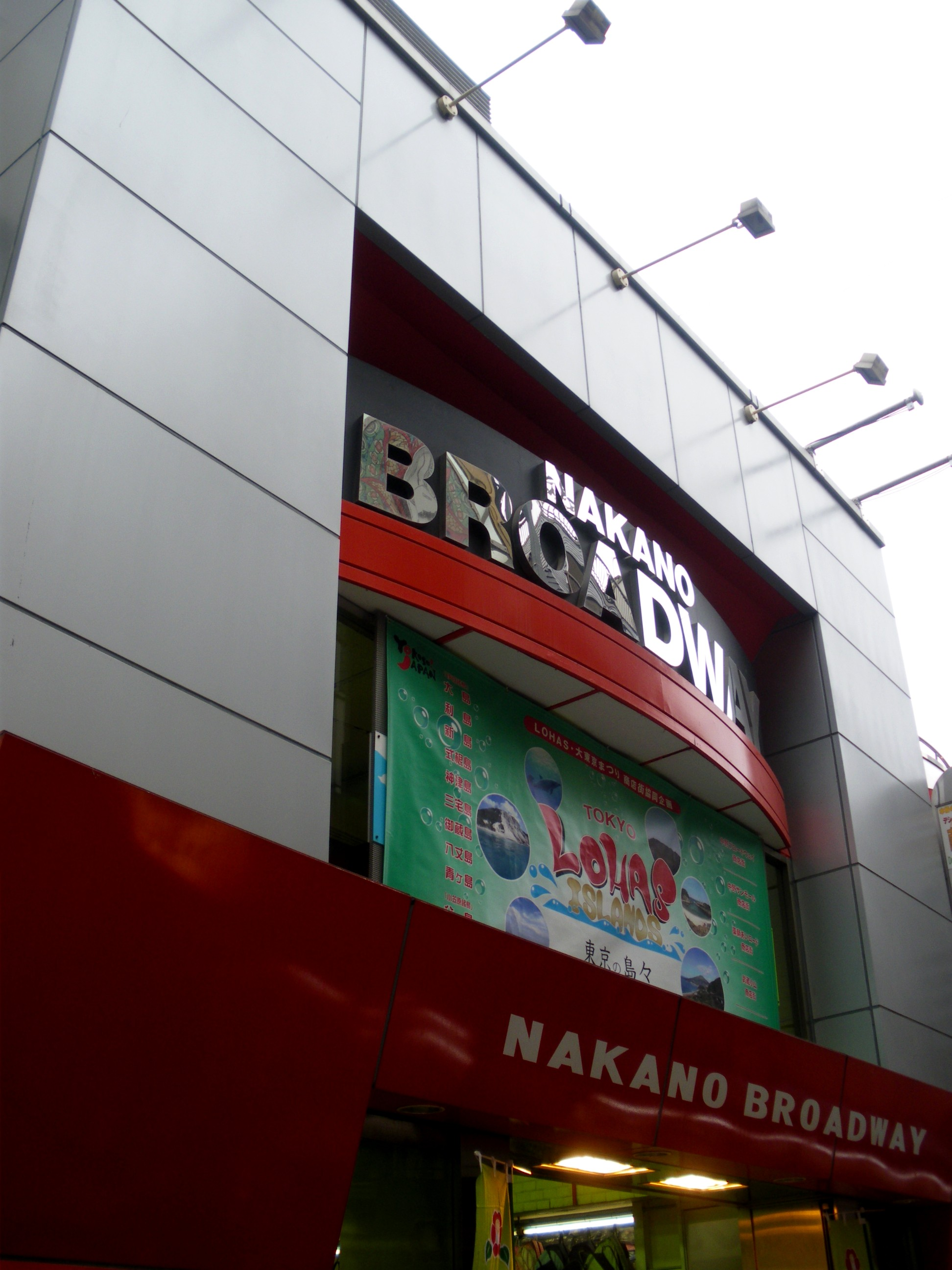
The entrance to Nakano Broadway in Nakano, Tokyo. The complex houses Mandarake's first store and corporate offices.

Mandarake was established by manga artist Masuzo Furukawa. A member of the Garo Trio (ガロ三羽烏) along with Shinichi Abe and Yuji Suzuki, Furukawa and the group became known in the 1970s for their work in the alternative manga magazine Garo. Initially established as a used manga store, Mandarake opened its first location at a seven-square meter storefront in the Nakano Broadway shopping complex in Nakano, Tokyo in 1980. Furukawa developed a public profile and promoted Mandarake through his appearances on We Appraise Anything, a variety series on TV Tokyo in which he appeared as an appraiser for rare and vintage manga.

The store was formally incorporated in February 1987, with Furukawa's father appointed as president. The company subsequently began a process of expansion, acquiring multiple stores in Nakano Broadway and widening its scope to sell a broader range of otaku-related goods. Mandarake opened its second store in Shibuya in 1994, and began to steadily expand its number of stores thereafter.

In 1995, the company established a publishing department that publishes Mandarake Manga List, a mail order catalog, and Mandarake Zenbu, a premium hobby magazine for collectors. Mandarake was listed on Mothers and became a public company on July 26, 2000, and moved to the Second Section of the Tokyo Stock Exchange on February 1, 2015. In 2001, Mandarake launched Mandaray, an internet streaming television channel, in partnership with Activision. The channel, which aired a variety of otaku-related content, suspended service in 2008.

=== Operations ===
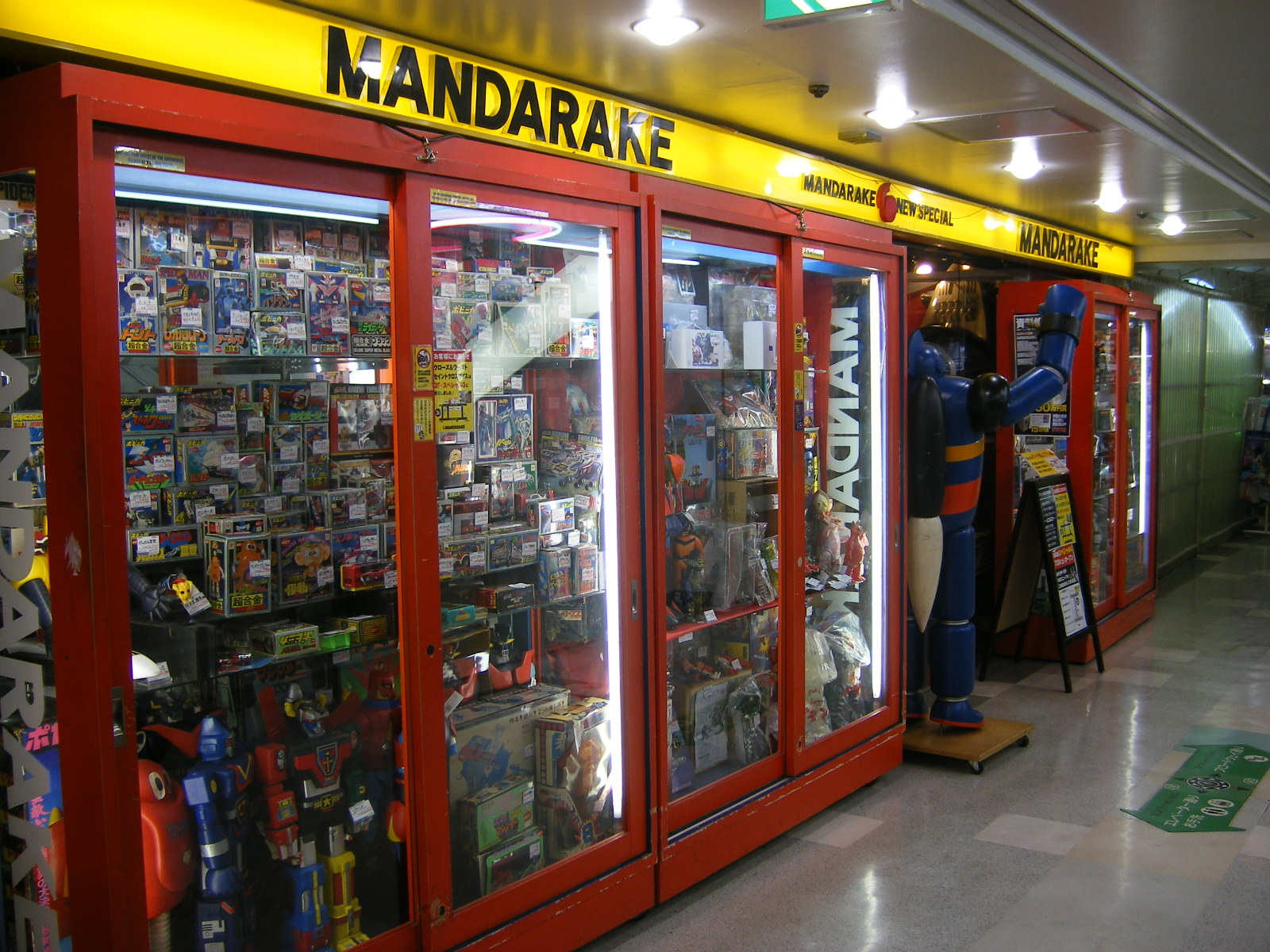
Mandarake New Special, one of 27 Mandarake-branded stores located in Nakano Broadway. This particular store specializes in toy robots and action figures such as Ultraman and Transformers.

As of September 2018, toy sales make up the majority of Mandarake's business, composing 48 percent of all non-consolidated sales. Books compose 14 percent of all sales, doujinshi compose 13 percent, and other publications that are not books or doujinshi compose 1 percent; the remaining 24 percent of sales are composed of miscellaneous items. Exports compose 17 percent of Mandarake's non-consolidated sales.

== Locations ==
In Kantō, Mandarake operates six locations: four stores located in Tokyo, one store located in Utsunomiya, and a warehouse fulfillment center located in Chiba. In Tokyo, Mandarake's first store in Nakano has operated continuously out of the Nakano Broadway shopping complex since 1980, which also houses the company's corporate offices. Nakano Broadway houses twenty-seven individual shops (also known as annexes or kan) operating under the Mandarake brand. Each shop is focused on a single category of item, such as cosplay costumes or doujinshi. Several Mandarake annexes in Nakano Broadway were once independent stores that were acquired by the company. Additional stores in Tokyo include Mandarake Complex, an eight-story store in Akihabara opened in April 2008; Mandarake Shibuya, which features a karaoke stage; and Mandarake Ikebukuro, a store located near Otome Road that specializes in boys' love and shōjo manga. Outside of Tokyo, Mandarake Utsunomiya is located in Mageshichō, Utsunomiya, while in rural Katori, Chiba, the company operates Mandarake Sahra, a storage and fulfillment center. Mandarake Sahra is open to the public for buyback only, and not sales.

In Hokkaido, Mandarake Sapporo moved to its current location at Norbesa from its former space at Sapporo Nanairo on March 17, 2012, tripling the size of the store. In Tōkai, Mandarake Nagoya moved to its current location in Naka-ku in 2007 due to insufficient floor space at its previous location; the move saw Mandarake Nagoya expand the size of the store from 266 square meters to 578 square meters.

In Kansai, Mandarake operates two locations located in Osaka. Mandarake's first store in Osaka, Mandarake Umeda, is located in Doyama. Its second location in Osaka, Mandarake Grandchaos, is located in Amerikamura. Two shop locations operate in Kyushu: Mandarake Fukuoka is located in Tenjin, and Mandarake Kokura is located in Kokurakita-ku, Kitakyūshū. Mandarake also operates an online storefront in both Japanese and English. The store ships items both domestically within Japan, and internationally to 83 countries.

Internationally, Mandarake operated a store in California from 1999 to 2003; initially located in Torrance, the store later relocated to Santa Monica before ultimately closing. The company also formerly operated a store in Bologna in 2001, and a store in Beijing.

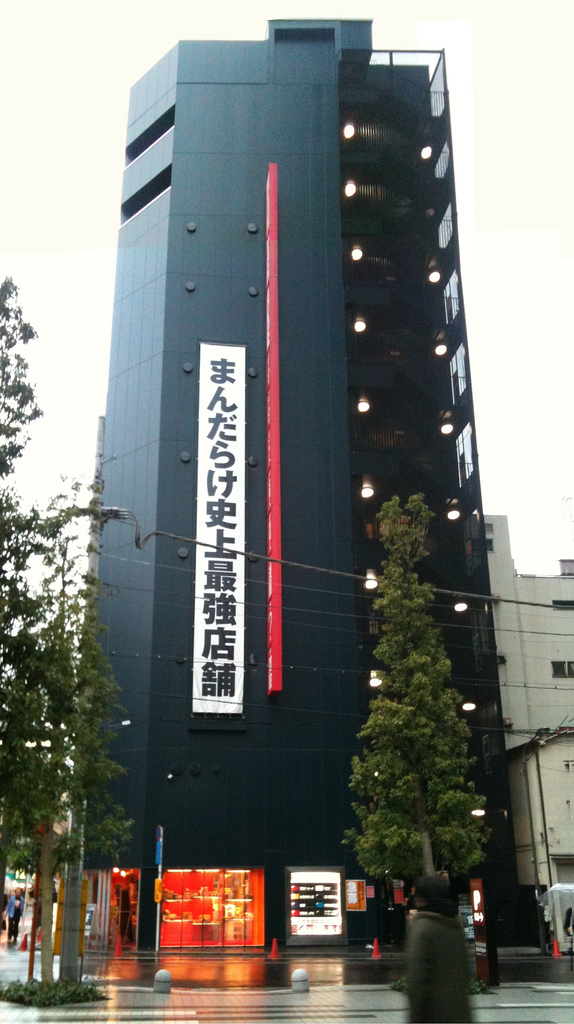
Exterior of Mandarake Complex in Akihabara, Tokyo.

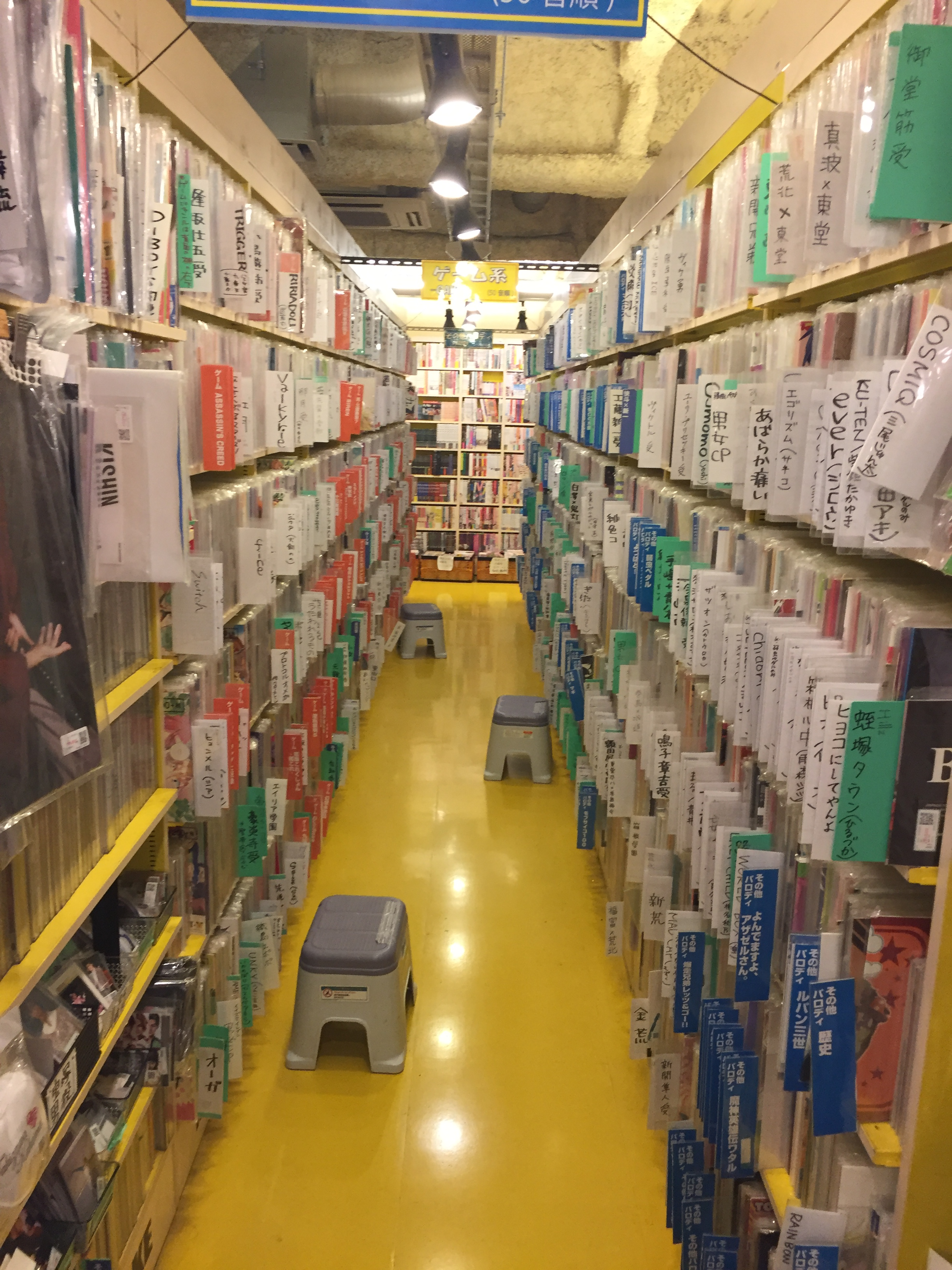
Shelves of dōjinshi on the fifth floor of Mandarake Complex in Akihabara, Tokyo

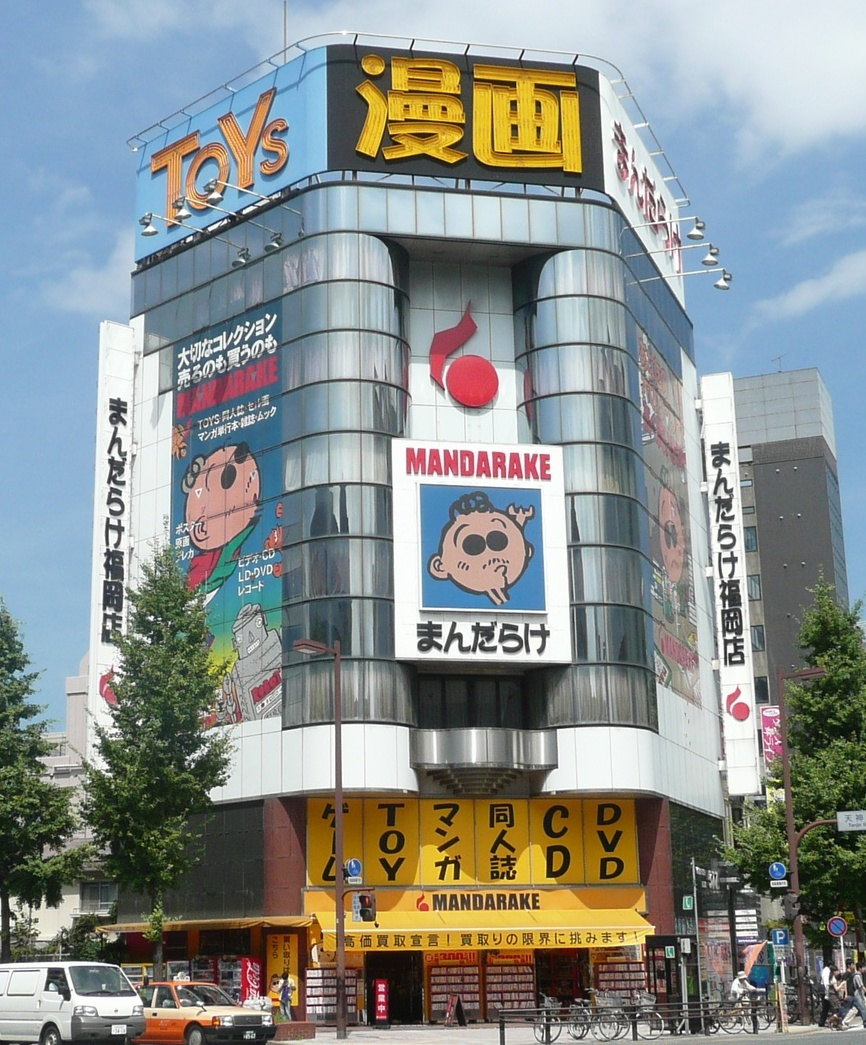
Mandarake Fukuoka in Fukuoka.

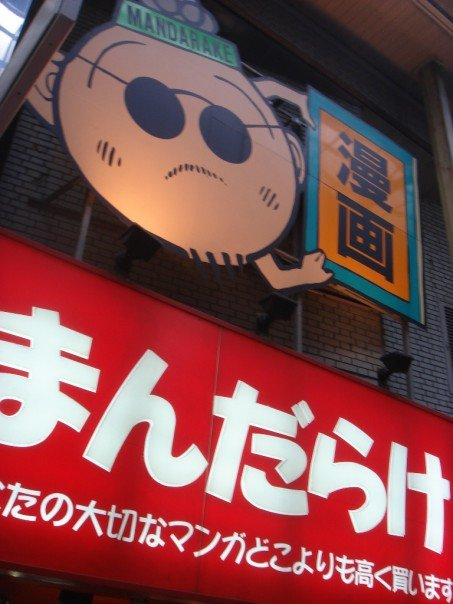
Signage for Mandarake Umeda in Osaka, depicting a cartoon image of Masuzo Furukawa.

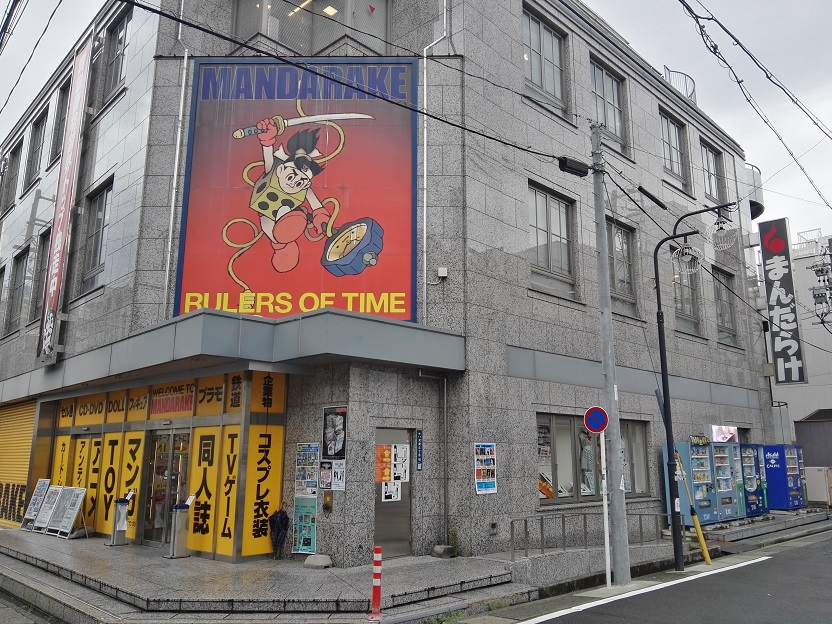
Mandarake Nagoya in Nagoya.

== Impact ==
Mandarake is the largest secondhand comics retailer in the world, with the company's financial success cited by Philomena Keet in Tokyo Fashion City as "a testament to the fervor of Japanese fanatics, the dedication of Japanese collectors, and the richness of Japan's material culture." The company sells and purchases roughly ten thousand items per day, and has a point of sale system that includes over 20 million items. Its original pricing and appraisal operations are recognized as having a major impact on the secondhand book market. The company maintains a policy of purchasing items at roughly half the cost it plans to resell the item, which was noted by The New York Times as bringing transparency to the often opaque appraisal market.

The company actively seeks foreign customers, offering an English-language online store and sales staff fluent in foreign languages. The company also promotes itself as a tourist attraction in Japan, and is marketed as a major destination for foreign otaku.

== Notable incidents ==
In 2003, Mandarake was accused of selling improperly-acquired manuscripts by Kenshi Hirokane and Yayoi Watanabe. The items in question were sold to Mandarake by Hirokane and Watanabe's publisher Sakura Comics in an unsuccessful attempt by the publisher to stave off bankruptcy, rather than returned to the artists per their publishing agreements. Mandarake contended that it had no way of knowing that Sakura Publishing was not permitted to sell the manuscripts; the manuscripts were ultimately returned to the artists in a subsequent lawsuit.

On November 16, 2012, a former Mandarake employee petitioned the Tokyo District Court for the payment of unpaid overtime from the company, claiming that he was not compensated for time spent at work before and after store opening hours. The plaintiff sought ¥2,292,246 in unpaid wages and additional damages of ¥2,194,046. The court ruled in favor of the plaintiff, and ordered Mandarake to pay ¥2,233,606 in unpaid wages and additional damages of ¥2,108,165.

In 2016, the Tokyo Metropolitan Police Department cited Mandarake under the Antique Business Law for insufficiently verifying the identities of individuals who purchased items from Mandarake in online auctions. Under that law, individuals purchasing secondhand goods must identify themselves with photo identification, in order for police to track the movement of secondhand goods that may have been stolen. The Tokyo District Court consequently suspended Mandarake Complex's online sales license for one month, and fined the company ¥300,000.

In 2018, an original illustration from Ai to Makoto, one of a series of fifteen believed lost in 1974, was listed for sale in an online auction by Mandarake. Ai to Makoto publisher Kodansha requested that the illustration be returned to the company, and issued a statement asking the public to not bid in the auction. The illustration ultimately sold at auction to a private buyer for ¥4 million.

=== 2014 shoplifting incident ===
On August 4, 2014, a vintage Tetsujin 28-go tin toy worth ¥250,000 was shoplifted from Mandarake Nakano. Mandarake posted an image of the shoplifter taken from security camera footage on their website with the subject's face obscured using mosaic censorship, alongside a statement that the image would be posted with the pixelation removed if the item was not returned within a week. The Tokyo Metropolitan Police requested that Mandarake not publish the uncensored image; though Mandarake initially stated that it would not comply with the request, the company ultimately elected not to publish the uncensored image.

The incident prompted a public debate over the ethics of Mandarake's actions, and whether they constituted an illegal threat of intimidation. In an interview with Weekly Toyo Keizai, Mandarake president Masuzo Furukawa stated that decision to post the image was motivated by a desire to have the item returned, and to deter future shoplifters. Shoko Nakagawa was among the public figures who voiced support for Mandarake's actions.

On August 19, 2014, the shoplifter was identified as Kazutoshi Iwama and arrested by the Tokyo Metropolitan Police after he attempted to sell the toy to another secondhand store. Iwama stated that he was unaware that Mandarake posted his image until after he was arrested. He was later sentenced in court to one year of imprisonment and three years of probation.

== See also ==
- Animate
- Book Off
- Comic Toranoana
- Comic Takaoka
- K-Books
