= Mango (disambiguation) =

A mango is an edible stone fruit produced by the tropical tree Mangifera indica.

Mango may also refer to:

== Plants and birds ==
- Mango (cannabis), a cultivar of Cannabis sativa
- Mango (hummingbird), a genus of hummingbird
- Mango melon, a variety of melon

== Places ==
- Mango Creek, a village in Belize
- Mango, Jamshedpur, a suburb of Jamshedpur, India
- Mango, Piedmont, a commune in Italy
- Mango, Togo, a city in Togo
- Mango (Tonga), an island in Tonga
- Mango, Florida, an unincorporated community in the U.S.

== Languages ==
- Mango language (Chad)
- Mango language (China)

== People ==
- Andrew Mango (1926–2014), British author on contemporary Turkey
- Angelina Mango (born 2001), Italian singer-songwriter
- Cyril Mango (1928–2021), British Byzantinist
- Giuseppe "Pino" Mango (1954–2014), known as Mango, Italian singer-songwriter
- Mandy Mango, American drag queen
- Mang0 (born 1991), American electronic sports player
- Marlia Mango, Byzantine archaeologist and historian
- Susan Mango, American biologist

== Technology, brands and companies ==
- Mango (airline), a South African airline
- Mango (smart card), an English public transport smart card
- Mango (retailer), a Spanish clothing company
- Mango (software), a viewer for medical volumetric images
- Mango Languages, an online language-learning company
- Mango, a satellite that is part of the Prisma satellite project
- Mango, a European brand of velomobile
- Mango, the code name of a software update for Windows Phone; see Windows Phone version history
- Project Mango, the codename for the video game Star Birds
- Letin Mengo, also known as Letin Mango, an electric car

== Film and television ==
- "The Mango", an episode of the American TV series Seinfeld
- "The Mango", an episode of Yoko! Jakamoko! Toto!
- Mangoes (TV series), Canadian drama serial about South Asian Youth
- Tears of Steel (code named "Project Mango"), a 2012 open content short film by the Blender Foundation
- Mango (Saturday Night Live), character on the American TV series Saturday Night Live

== Media ==
=== Television channels ===
- Mango TV, a Chinese video streaming platform owned by Hunan Broadcasting System
- Mango TV (Dominican Republic), a Dominican television channel

=== Radio ===
- Mango Radio, a Christian FM radio network owned by RT Broadcast Specialists in the Philippines:
  - DXYP in Davao City
  - DXKZ and DXLL-AM in Zamboanga City
- Radio Mango 91.9, a radio station in India
- Radio Mango (Livno), a Bosnian radio station

== Music ==
- Mango (group), Lithuanian pop group
- Mango (singer) (1954–2014), Italian singer
- Mango Records, American record label
- Grupo Mango, Venezuelan salsa group
- "Mangos" (song), a 1956 song written by Dee Libbey and Sid Wayne
- "Mango" (Peach Tree Rascals song), a 2019 song by Peach Tree Rascals
- Mango, a 2020 song by Dev

== Other uses ==
- Mango (color), a yellow-orange color
- Mango (horse), a racehorse
- Mango (poem), a 1936 poem by Vyloppilli Sreedhara Menon

== See also ==
- Mango City (disambiguation)
- Mangoes (TV series)
- Manga (disambiguation)
- Mangu (disambiguation)
