= Manga (disambiguation) =

Manga are comics or graphic novels originating from Japan.

Manga may also refer to:

== Arts, entertainment and media ==
- Manga (band), stylized maNga, a Turkish rock band
  - Manga (album), 2004
  - Manga+, 2006
- Manga (magazine), a free quarterly by Tokyopop
- Manga Entertainment, an American company
- Hokusai Manga, a collection of sketches by Hokusai
- The Citi Exhibition: Manga, an exhibition at the British Museum

== Languages ==
- Manga language (China), a Lolo-Burmese language
- Manga Kanuri, a dialect of Kanuri language in Central Africa

== Places ==
- Manga Department, department in Zoundwéogo Province, Burkina Faso
- Manga, Burkina Faso, capital of Manga Department and Zoundwéogo Province, Burkina Faso

== People ==
- Manga (surname)
- Manga (footballer, born 1929), Agenor Gomes, a Brazilian footballer
- Manga (footballer, born 1937), Haílton Corrêa de Arruda, a Brazilian footballer
- Manga (rapper), a member of the British grime crew Roll Deep
- Manga Arabs, Omani Arabs who have immigrated to parts of East Africa
- Manga, A Mizo chief, Mângpawrha

== Other uses ==
- Manga (moth), of the family Noctuidae
- Manga, a sub-formation of the tercio of the Spanish Army
- Manga, word for mango in Portuguese and other languages

== See also ==
- Mangas (disambiguation)
- Mango (disambiguation)
- Mangga Buang language
- Original English-language manga
- Manga Bell, a Cameroonian surname
