= Fuglen =

Norwegian chain of coffeeshops / cocktail bars

- Formerly: Kaffefuglen
- Industry: Coffeehouse, Bar
- Founded: 1963; 63 years ago; Oslo, Norway
- Number of locations: 13 (2026)
- Key people: Einar Kleppe Holthe, Peppe Trulsen and Halvor Digernes
- Website: www.fuglen.no

Fuglen (English: The Bird) is a Norwegian chain of coffee and cocktail bars with locations in Norway, Japan, South Korea and Indonesia.

Fuglen showcases a retro style reminiscent of Norwegian homes in the 1950s and 60s. Most of the interior is for sale, which aims to change its visual expression over time while still adhering to the time period.

== History ==
The first location was opened in the city centre of Oslo in 1963, then as "Kaffefuglen". After being transferred to new ownership in 2008, the name was changed to "Fuglen".

In 2010, the business was expanded to include a cocktail bar, as well as featuring a vintage items and furniture shop.

The first Tokyo location was opened in Shibuya in 2012.

In part due to logistical issues with supplying coffee shipments from Oslo to Tokyo, a coffee roastery was opened in Tokyo in 2014.

The second Oslo location, which also features a coffee roastery, opened in 2018 in Gamlebyen.

In 2024, two more locations were opened in Seoul and Jakarta.

== Further expansion ==
There were plans to establish a shop in New York in 2013, but this has yet to materialise. Holthe stated in 2016 that there were significant challenges with transferring the business model and approach to the US.

Despite having received multiple franchise offers, Fuglen wants their business to expand in a "slow and natural" fashion, preferring to own the trademark and operate all the bars themselves.

== Collaborations ==
In 2014, Japanese artist Takashi Murakami teamed up with Fuglen to create Bar Zingaro in Nakano Broadway.

The bars Byens Tak and Byens Gulv in the Folketeateret building at Youngstorget were opened in 2023 and 2024 respectively as a collaboration between Fuglen and Rodeo Architects.

== Locations ==
Country	First opened	Number of locations
Norway	1963	2
Japan	2012	8
South Korea	2024	1
Indonesia	2024	2
