= Otome Road =

Area of Ikebukuro, Tokyo, Japan

Coordinates: 35.7303°N 139.7180°E

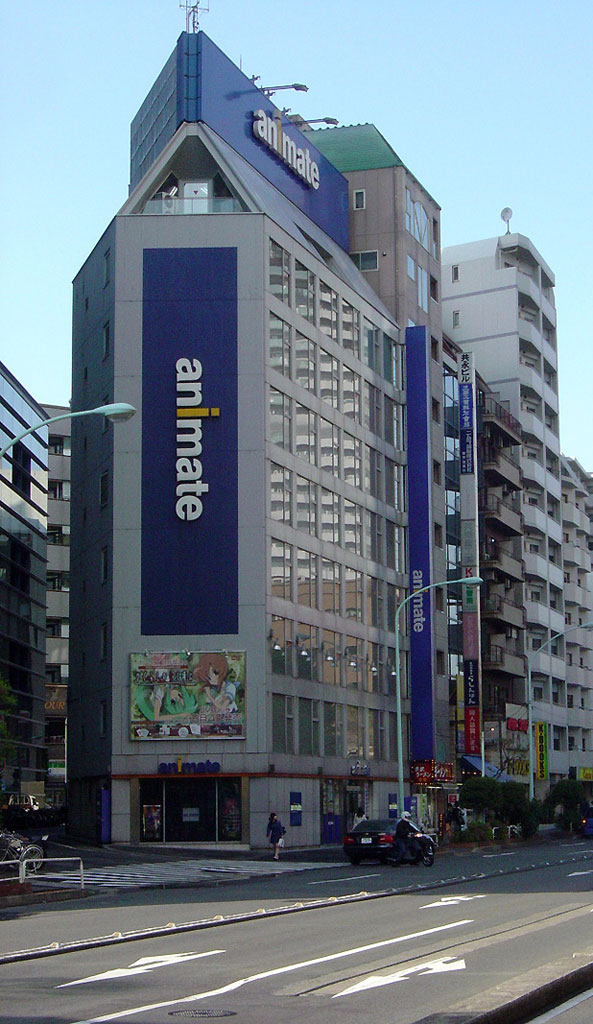
Animate in Ikebukuro, a major fixture of Otome Road

Otome Road (乙女ロード, Otome Rōdo; lit. 'Maiden Road') is a name given to an area of Ikebukuro, Tokyo, Japan that is a major shopping and cultural center for anime and manga aimed at women. The area is sometimes referred to as Fujoshi Street, referencing the name given to fans of yaoi.

== Geography ==
Points of interest on Otome Road, with locations on Otome Road proper marked in red. Pan and zoom the map and click on points for more details.

Otome Road is located to the immediate west of Sunshine City, near Ikebukuro Station. Bordered by the Shuto Expressway, its boundaries are roughly defined as beginning at the Ikebukuro Animate store and ending at the K-Books Cosplay Store. Several other stores focused on goods aimed at women are located further west in Ikebukuro, mainly concentrated around the flagship Animate store. As Otome Road is only a small area of a larger commercial district, it does not have frequenters who walk around in cosplay, and is not immediately distinguishable from other streets.

== History ==
Ikebukuro has been a destination for otaku since the 1980s, with notable attractions including a branch of the anime goods store Animate and the dōjinshi conventions Comic Revolution (now defunct) and Creation, both held at Sunshine City. These stores and conventions were initially focused on general audiences; the area would not shift to a focus on female customers until 2000, following a renovation of Animate that shifted the products of the store to appeal to that demographic. That same year, K-Books in Ikebukuro changed its product offerings to specialize in dōjinshi aimed at women.

The term "Otome Road" was first used in the May 2004 issue of Puff. The area gained further visibility through the 2005 film Densha Otoko, which presented Otome Road as the female equivalent to Akihabara, another popular location for otaku.

== Notable locations ==
Comic Toranoana and Mandarake both operate Otome Road locations specializing in goods aimed at women. In 2005, a butler café opened on Otome Road.

Otome Road additionally contains multiple household goods, cosmetics, and clothing stores, particularly stores specializing in otome-kei fashion.

== See also ==
- Shōjo manga
- Tourism in Japan
- Yaoi
