= Mangas (disambiguation) =

Mangas may refer to:

- Manga, comics or graphic novels originating from Japan
- Mangas, a social group in the Belle Époque era's counterculture of Greece
- Mangas Adans., a taxonomic synonym of the plant genus Mangifera
- Mangas (TV channel), in France
- Mangas District, in Bolognesi province, Peru
- Mangas, New Mexico, U.S., an extinct town
- Mangas language, or Mantsi language, in Nigeria
- Mangas Coloradas (c. 1793 – 1863), Apache tribal chief

== See also ==
- Manga (disambiguation)
