= Manga (surname) =

Manga is an African surname that may refer to the following notable people:

== Sport ==
- Manga (footballer, born 1929) (1929–2004), Brazilian football goalkeeper and manager
- Manga (footballer, born 1937) (1937–2025), Brazilian football goalkeeper
- Alberto Manga (born 1980), Spanish football midfielder.
- Ben Manga (born 1974), Equatoguinean football scout and former player
- Bruno Ecuele Manga (born 1988), Gabonese football player
- Carol Manga (born c. 1988), Cameroonian rugby player who co-founded the Cameroon Rugby League XIII in 2012
- David Manga (born 1989), Central African football player
- Edu Manga (1967–2025), Brazilian footballer
- Franck Manga Guela (born 1986), Ivorian football midfielder
- Helistano Manga, (born 1999), Bissau-Guinean football midfielder
- Jean Manga Onguéné (born 1946), Cameroonian football centre-forward
- Tabi Manga (born 1994), Cameroonian football defender

== Other people ==
- Bébé Manga (1948–2011), Cameroonian singer
- Carlos Manga (1928–2015), Brazilian film director
- Lionel Manga (1955–2024), Cameroonian writer and cultural critic
- Michael Manga (born 1968), Canadian-American geoscientist
- Rodrigo Manga (born 1980), Brazilian politician
- Rudolf Duala Manga Bell (1873–1914), Duala king and resistance leader in Cameroon
- Sirlange Manga (born 1979), Brazilian politician
