= The Citi Exhibition: Manga =

2019 exhibition at the British Museum

- Catalog for the exhibition, featuring Asirpa from Golden Kamuy by Satoru Noda
- Date: May 23 – August 26, 2019
- Venue: The British Museum
- Location: London, England
- Patrons: Citi, IAG Cargo
- Organised by: Nicole Rousmaniere and Matsuba Ryoko (curators, Sainsbury Institute for Art)
- Website: Official website

The Citi Exhibition: Manga (or simply Manga, stylized as The Citi exhibition Manga マンガ') was an exhibition housed at the British Museum from May 23 to August 26, 2019. It was the largest exhibition of manga (Japanese comics or graphic novels) ever held outside of Japan.

== Overview ==
The Citi Exhibition: Manga was organized by The National Art Center of Tokyo and the Organisation for the Promotion of Manga and Anime, and curated by the Sainsbury Institute for the Study of Japanese Arts and Cultures. It was held from May 23 to August 26, 2019, at the British Museum in London, England. (Note: The museum has collected manga periodicals since 1874, beginning with the first manga magazine Eshinbun Nipponchi.) The Citi Exhibition: Manga was the largest exhibition of manga ever held outside of Japan, and focused broadly on the history of manga, its artistic value, its social impact, and the manga production process. The exhibition itself was divided into six zones:

1. A basic overview of manga, including editorial and production processes
2. The history of manga from the Meiji era to the present
3. Genres of manga, including sports, adventure, romance, science fiction, and boys' love
4. The impact of manga on society, including Comiket and the World Cosplay Summit
5. Original manga artwork
6. Three-dimensional works based on manga, such as ceramics and sculptures

A central display of the exhibition was Shintomiza Kabuki Theatre Curtain (1880) by Kawanabe Kyosai; The Citi Exhibition: Manga was the final international exhibition of the piece, as it will no longer be loaned to museums outside of Japan due its age and fragility. Other major displays included original artwork by Akira Toriyama from his manga series Dragon Ball, in the first time the series' original artwork has been exhibited outside of Japan; a digital re-creation of Comic Takaoka, the first manga store in Japan; and the 12-minute silent documentary Manga: No Limits, Studio Ghibli in Close-Up, focused on the works of the anime studio Studio Ghibli.

An exhibition catalog was published in 2019 by Thames & Hudson in both English and Japanese.

== Reception ==
The Citi Exhibition: Manga was the British Museum's most popular exhibition in 2019, and had the youngest audience on record for any paid exhibition at the museum.

In a review for The Guardian, critic Jonathan Jones gave the exhibition 2 out of 5 stars, calling it "a tragicomic abandonment of a great museum's purpose," criticizing the juxtaposition of classic Japanese art with modern manga as inviting patrons "to seriously accept that manga's big-eyed heroes ... are themselves as worthy of attention as a work by Hokusai." In a responding review also published in The Guardian, critic David Barnett wrote that manga "belongs in the British Museum as much as the Elgin Marbles", and commended the British Museum for having "rightly recognised [that manga] has contributed rather uniquely to modern culture over at least a hundred years, and continues to do so". In commentary for The Comics Grid, critic Salina Christmas wrote that they were "in awe" of the exhibition, and that they were "proud to see Asian culture enjoying this level of prominence at the British Museum.".

== Further media ==
- Iszi Lawrence (August 27, 2019). "The British Museum Membercast: The power of manga" (Podcast). The British Museum.
