= Butler café =

Subcategory of cosplay restaurant

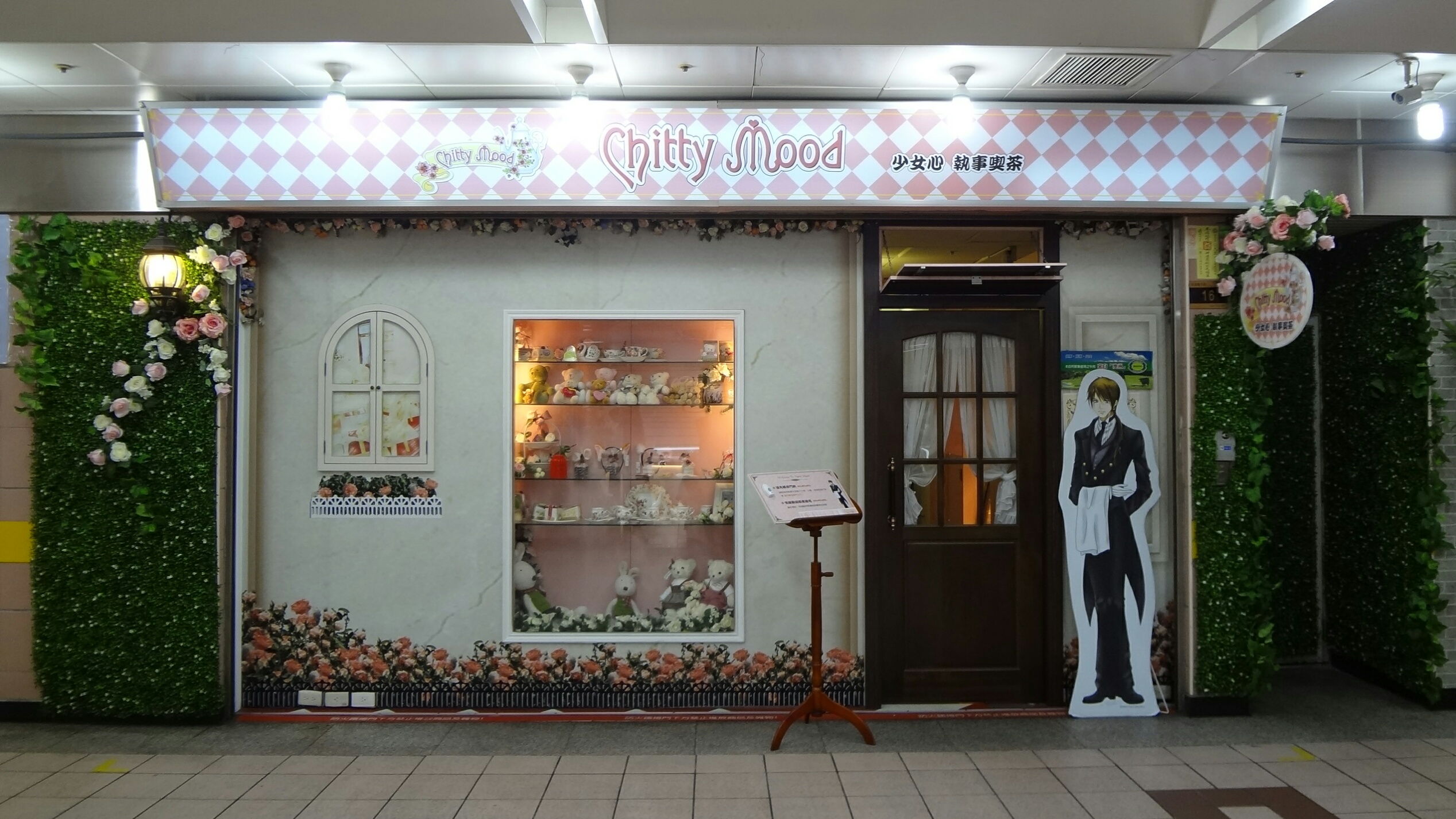
Exterior of Chitty Mood, a butler café in Taipei City Mall

A butler café (Japanese: 執事喫茶, Hepburn: shitsuji kissa) is a subcategory of cosplay restaurant that originated in Japan. In these cafés, waiters dress as butlers and serve patrons in the manner of domestic servants attending to aristocracy. Butler cafés proliferated in reaction to the popularity of maid cafés and serve as an alternative category of cosplay restaurant intended to appeal to female otaku.

== History ==
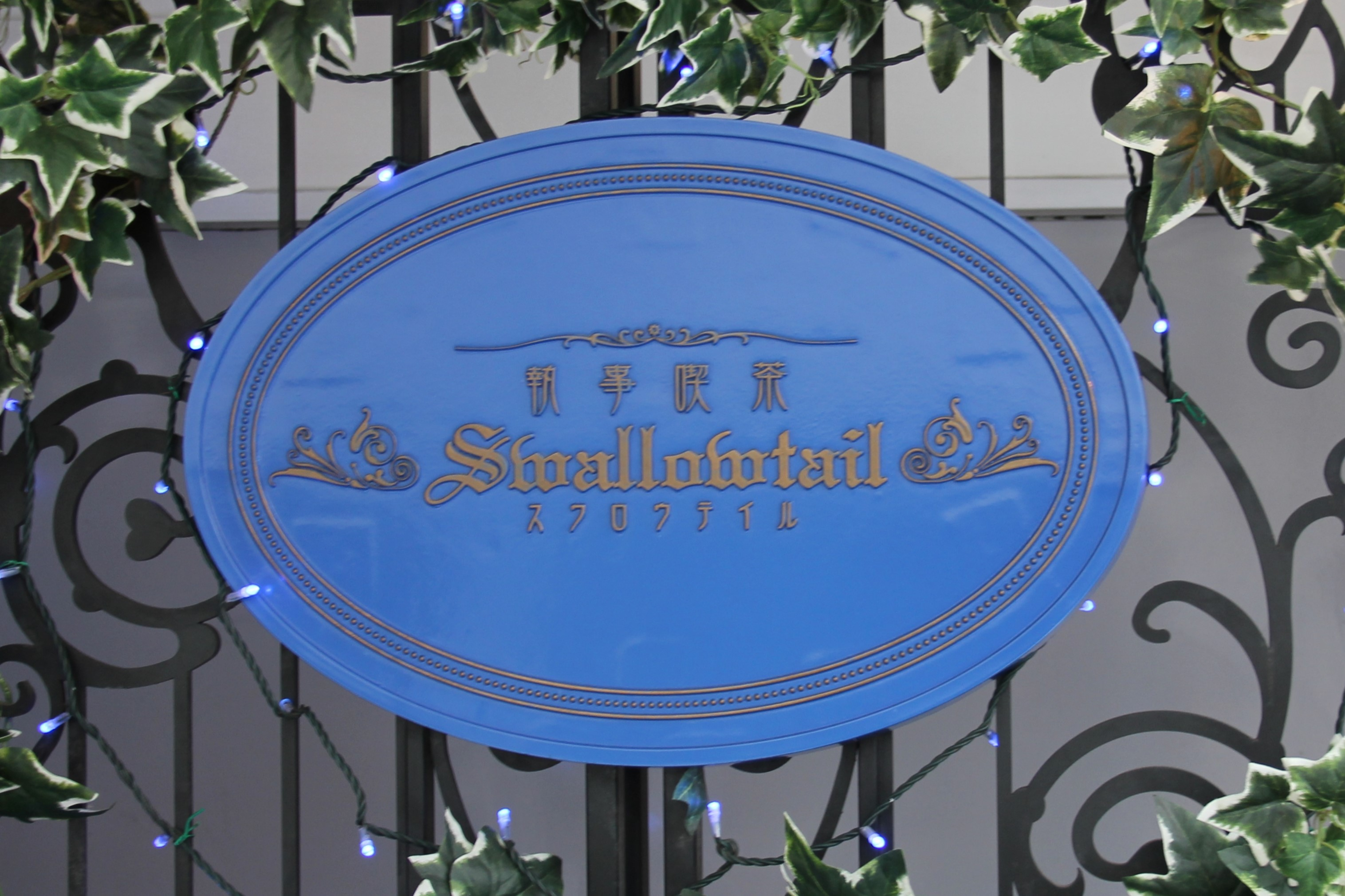
Signage for Swallowtail, alleged first ever butler café (Ikebukuro, Tokyo)

Maid cafés, where waitresses dress as maids to serve a primarily male clientele, achieved widespread popularity in Japan in the early 2000s. Butler cafés were conceived in response to their popularity, after entrepreneurs noted a rise in Internet message board postings from female otaku – devoted fans, particularly of anime and manga – who had a negative perception of maid cafés, and sought a "role-reversing alternative" to them. Women expressed their desire for an establishment where they could seek male companionship in an environment that was less costly than a host club, and more romantic and safe than a nightclub. Butlers were chosen as a male counterpart to maids, appealing to fairy tale princess fantasies.

The first butler café, Swallowtail, opened in March 2005. Swallowtail is located on Otome Road, a major shopping and cultural destination for female otaku in Ikebukuro, Tokyo, and was founded by management consulting firm Oriental Corporation and the anime and manga goods chain K-Books. In 2006, the café Butlers Café opened in Shibuya, Tokyo. Founded by former office worker Yuki Hirohata, Butlers Café employed a staff composed entirely of Western men, and allowed patrons to practice English with the butlers. Butlers Café closed in December 2018. In 2011, the butler café Refleurir opened as the first butler café in Akihabara, Tokyo, before closing in 2013. Several dansō (cross-dressing) cosplay cafés with a butler theme operate in Akihabara, in which female servers dress as male butlers.

Outside of Japan, notable butler cafés include Chitty Mood, which operates out of Taipei City Mall in Taipei, Taiwan, and Lan Yu Guan European Tea Restaurant (formerly named Michaelis), which opened in North District, Taichung, Taiwan in 2012. The first butler café in South Korea opened in Yeonnam-dong, Seoul in 2024, and gained popularity through social networking services. In North America, Europe, and Oceania, pop-up butler cafés have been hosted at anime conventions, including Anime Expo in the United States, Hücon in Turkey, and SMASH! in Australia, which was the first anime convention to host a butler café.

== Characteristics ==
=== Japanese butler cafés ===
The central concept of a butler café is that the customer is treated as an aristocrat who has returned to their home for tea, where they are waited on by a personal butler. While maid cafés typically promote the physical attractiveness of the servers as their major selling point, butler cafés devote significant resources to environment, ambiance, and high-quality service. Customers are "welcomed home" upon entering and referred to with honorary titles, with female customers referred to as ojōsama ("milady") or ohimesama ("princess") and male customers as bocchan ("young lord") or dannasama ("master").

High-quality food is served – the menu of Swallowtail, for example, was developed by Paul Okada, the food and beverage director at the Four Seasons Tokyo – and the interior of the restaurant is typically designed to resemble an English country house or manor house with imported and custom furniture. Butlers may even take the time to inform the customer of the style of the decor and thoroughly describe the items on the menu. English-style afternoon tea is the most commonly-served food at butler cafés, including cakes, scones, sandwiches, and tea served in fine porcelain cups, which may also be the café's own custom ceramics.

Men employed as butlers can be as young as 18 or as old as 80, and receive extended training in tea preparation, etiquette, and restaurant service standards. The training process at Swallowtail takes several months and requires applicants to pass a test based on hotel restaurant standards. Job titles for butlers correspond to those of household staff, including "house steward" for the most senior manager and "footman" for servers. Butlers also occasionally appear in musicals, stage plays and concerts organized by the café, and sell souvenirs and CDs.

Photography is typically not permitted in butler cafés, though Butlers Café offered it as an additional service: services offered included the "Lift Me Up Photo", where a photo is taken of the butler physically lifting the customer; "Cinderella Time," where the customer receives bubbles, a tiara, and a silver bell on a platter; and "Study English," where customers receive a notebook to exchange notes in English with their butler during each visit. Butler cafés typically enforce a code of conduct for employees and customers that forbids certain activity, such as the exchange of personal information or meetings outside of the café space.

=== Non-Japanese butler cafés ===
Though Japanese and non-Japanese butler cafés are broadly similar in reservation methods, service flow, overall image, and emphasis on interaction between butlers and customers, there are several noteworthy differences across countries and regions. Taiwanese butler cafés are reported as having less rigorous preparatory training and a greater focus on on-the-job training, and use less luxurious European-style furniture as a result of limited investor funding. Further, as Chinese lacks honorifics that clearly distinguish between upper and lower social positions, the positional relationship between the butler and customer is established through the "performance" of the butler at Taiwanese butler cafés. Butler cafés at Western anime conventions are typically run by volunteers and enthusiasts, rather than by rigorously-trained service professionals.

=== Association with BL fandom ===
Butler cafés enjoy popularity among fujoshi – a name given to fans of boys' love (BL), a genre of male-male romance fiction aimed at women. In Japan, butler cafés are not specifically aimed at fans of BL, but rather are broadly considered a form of otome muke (乙女向け, lit. "for maidens", a term for media aimed at women). They have nevertheless gained popularity among some fujoshi, who project homosocial and homoerotic fantasies through their interactions with butlers. Conversely, the relationship between butler cafés and the BL fandom is more pronounced in Taiwan, where butler cafés emerged in direct response to the growth in popularity of BL.

== Analysis and impact ==
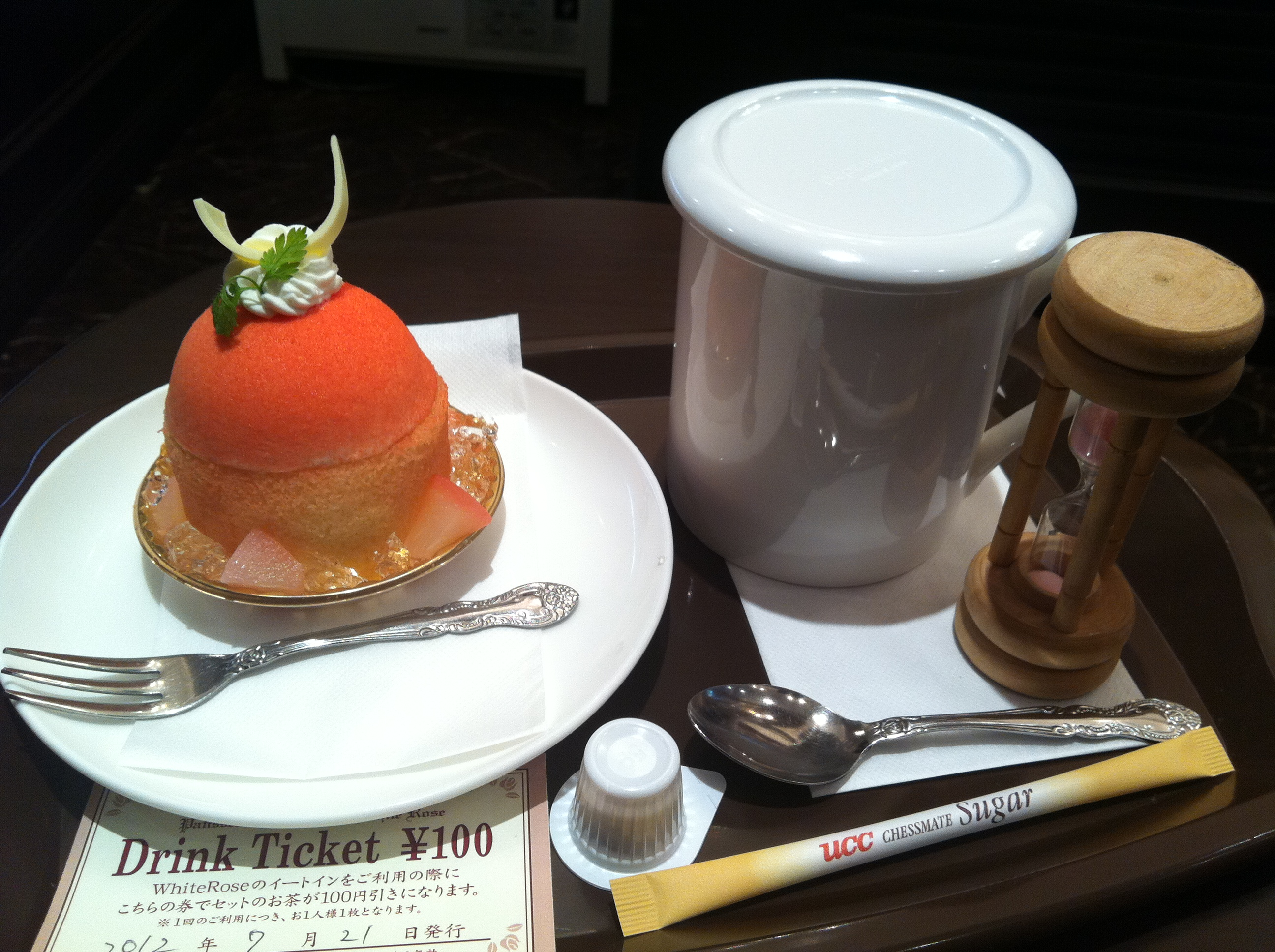
Tea and cake at Patisserie Swallowtail, a Swallowtail-branded pâtisserie

Butler cafés have been cited as an example of the influence of anime and manga on Japanese culture and commerce, with fictionalized depictions of butler cafés in anime and manga having popularized them as a concept and made them major destinations for otaku tourists in Japan. Patisserie Swallowtail, a Swallowtail-branded pâtisserie, has produced limited-edition baked goods in collaboration with several popular franchises and outlets, including the anime series Tokyo Ghoul, Monthly Girls' Nozaki-kun, and HenNeko; the video game series Danganronpa and Persona 3; and the department store Tokyu Hands. The anime series Beastars launched a pop-up butler café in 2019. Butler cafés outside of Japan serve a similar function of simulating Japanese culture for an otaku and Japanophile audience, with butler cafés in Taiwan using Japanese words in greetings, and hosting events such as yukata festivals and karaoke competitions. Butler cafés are further cited as representing the widening of cosplay, from a hobby that occurs exclusively in otaku spaces such as anime conventions, to an activity that occurs in public life.

Anime and manga scholar Susan J. Napier argues that butler cafés represent a widening of otaku culture to be inclusive of girls and women, but notes that the popularity of butler cafés does not necessarily represent a loosening of the culture's gender roles and expectations, stating that "maid and butler cafés, if anything, are reinforcing gender distinctions." Manga artist Keiko Takemiya "does not place great cultural significance" on butler cafés, but argues that they "allow Japanese women a chance to be served and escape their traditional role of serving men." Claire Gordon of Slate cites the all-Western staff of Butlers Café as functioning as a form of fantasy fulfillment, allowing its largely Japanese clientele to interact with a "hyperbolic, hypermannered extreme" of a stereotypical alluring Western male.

In 2006, Swallowtail reported serving more than 1,000 customers per month. Butlers Café reported having 2,000 regular customers at its peak, and 3,000 customers in its first month of operation. Swallowtail reports that 80 percent of their customers are female, with women in their 20s and 30s forming the majority of their clientele.

== See also ==
- Theme restaurant
- Happy Boys, a comedy series about workers at a butler café
- Tomodachiga Yatteru Cafe
