= Mango City =

Mango City may refer, as a nickname, to the following cities:

== India ==
- Malihabad, Uttar Pradesh
- Tuni, Andhra Pradesh
- Muthalamada, Palakkad, Kerala
- Krishnagiri, Tamil Nadu
- Periyakulam, Tamil Nadu
- Salem metropolitan area (India), Tamil Nadu
- Srinivaspur, Karnataka
- Jagtial, Telangana
- Malda, West Bengal

== Bangladesh ==
Bangladesh is the 10th largest mango agricultural producer in the world, and mango is the number one fruit produced in the country.

- Chapai Nawabganj District (alias: Mango Capital of Bangladesh)
- Rajshahi (alias: City of Mango)

== Elsewhere ==
- Mayagüez, Puerto Rico (alias: Ciudad del Mangó)

== See also ==
- Mungo City
