= Nakano Broadway =

- 中野ブロードウェイ
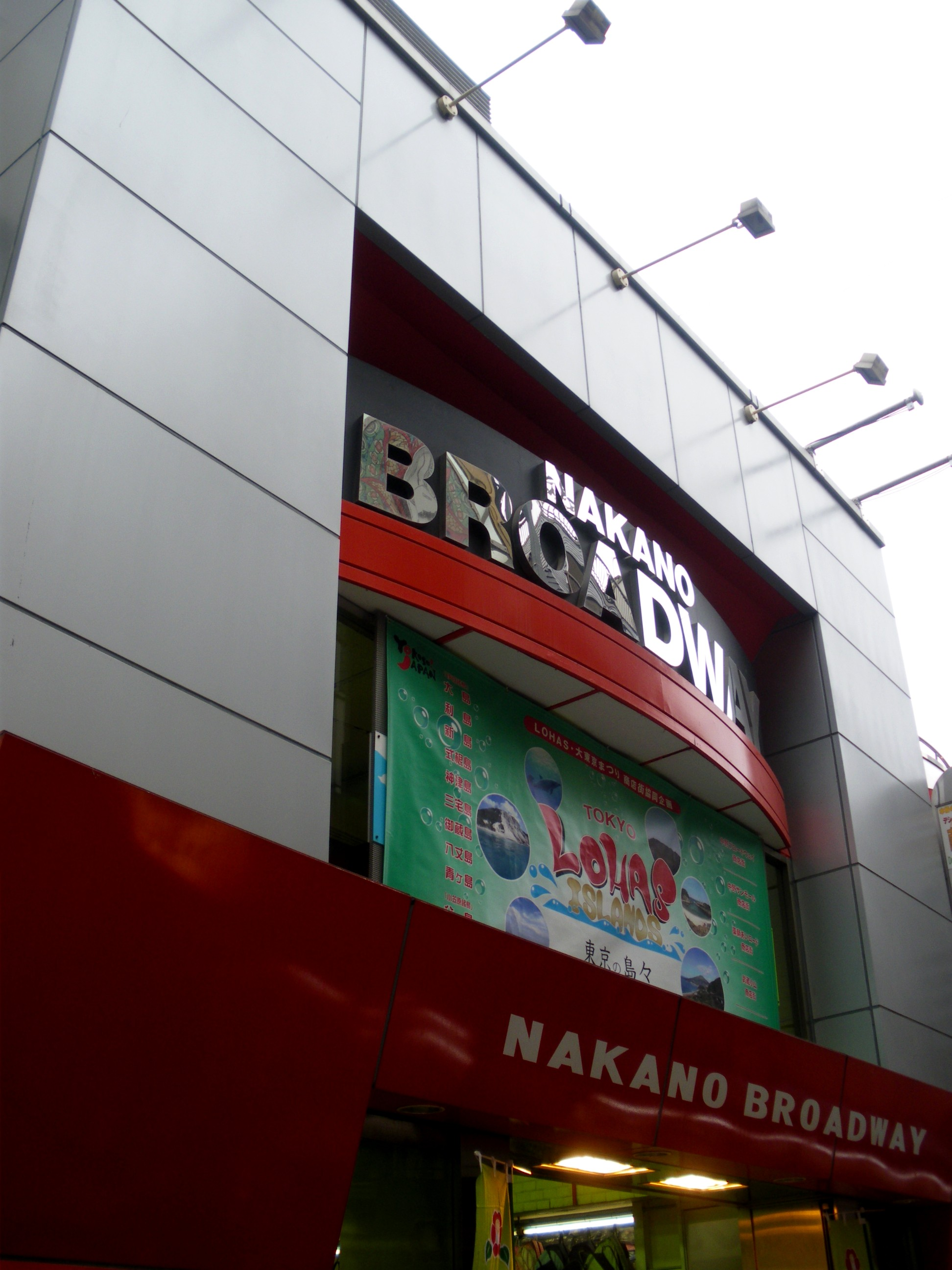
- Main entrance to Nakano Broadway
- Location: Nakano, Tokyo, Japan
- Coordinates: 35°42′33″N 139°39′56″E
- Opened: 1966
- Num. of stores: 300
- Floor area: 27,000 m^{2}
- Floors: 13
- Public transit: Nakano Station

Nakano Broadway (中野ブロードウェイ) is a shopping mall in Nakano, Tokyo. Founded in 1966 as a luxury shopping complex, it has become a popular destination for goods aimed at otaku (hobbyists and enthusiasts, particularly those of anime and manga).

== History ==
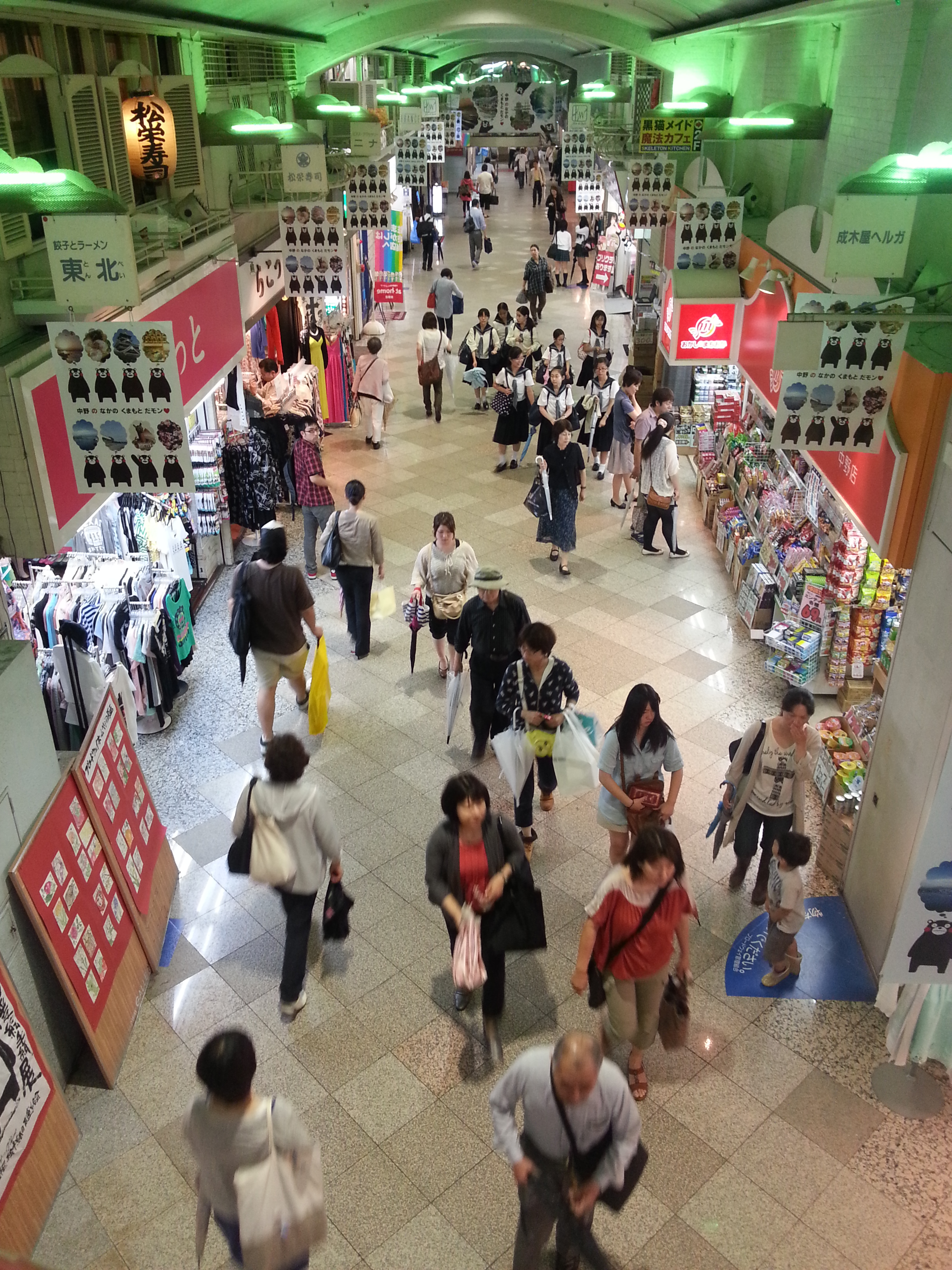
Interior of Nakano Broadway

Nakano Broadway was developed in the context of the Japanese economic miracle, wherein as Japan rebuilt in the aftermath of the Second World War, multiple megastructures were constructed. Among these were Nakano Broadway and nearby Nakano Sun Plaza, which were designed to be self-contained living and entertainment complexes. The mall opened in 1966 as a shopping and apartment complex housing shops, restaurants, apartments, and a rooftop terrace with a swimming pool and garden. While not a metabolist building, Nakano Broadway is noted as being influenced by metabolist architecture.

By the 1980s, Nakano had been eclipsed by Shibuya and Roppongi as districts that catered to luxury commerce, and Nakano Broadway had declined in popularity. As shops in Nakano Broadway are owned by individual retailers and not leased by a central mall administration, young entrepreneurs were able to acquire space in the mall with relatively small amounts of capital. Mandarake, a secondhand manga store, opened in the mall in 1980; Nakano Broadway subsequently shifted to being a destination for otaku-related goods, as stores catering to this demographic opened in the mall following Mandarake's success.

Today, Nakano Broadway remains a major destination for both domestic otaku and otaku tourists in Japan, catering to a niche clientele relative to mainstream otaku destinations in Akihabara and Ikebukuro. The physical design of the mall remains largely unchanged from its original 1966 construction and is often cited as an example of Shōwa era architecture. The mall was designated an at-risk building for earthquakes of a magnitude of 6.0 or greater by the Tokyo Metropolitan Government in March 2018, as the building was constructed prior to the implementation of contemporary seismic standards in 1981 and has not subsequently been retrofitted to be earthquake-resistant.

== Features ==
Nakano Broadway contains three basement levels and ten above-ground levels. The first basement to fourth floors of Nakano Broadway contain retail establishments: the basement level contains grocery stores, the ground level contains stores primarily selling clothing and secondhand goods, and the second, third, and fourth floors contain stores selling goods aimed at otaku, including manga, anime goods, figurines, idol merchandise, video games, CDs, and collectables. The remaining above-ground floors of Nakano Broadway contain apartments; Kenji Sawada and Yukio Aoshima are among the notable residents who once lived in Nakano Broadway.

Mandarake has operated continuously out of Nakano Broadway since 1980, with twenty-seven individual shops (also known as annexes or kan) at the mall operating under the Mandarake brand; the mall also houses the company's corporate offices. Each annex focuses on a single category of item, such as cosplay costumes or doujinshi, with several annexes once being independent stores that were acquired by the company. Artist Takashi Murakami operates several stores in Nakano Broadway, including the gallery Hidari Zingaro, the café Bar Zingaro, and the souvenir store Tonari No Zingaro. Other notable stores at Nakano Broadway include a branch of the used CD and DVD chain Fujiya Avic, and Taco Ché, an independent alternative manga store.

The mall is surrounded by a sprawl of pedestrian side streets that house numerous low-rise shops, boutiques, and izakayas. Sun Mall, a 225-meter-long (738 ft) glass-covered shōtengai, connects the mall to Nakano Station.

== Transportation access ==
Nakano Broadway is served by Nakano Station, which connects to the JR Chūō (Rapid) and Chūō-Sōbu lines, and the Tokyo Metro Tōzai Line.

== Gallery ==
Various views, 2021

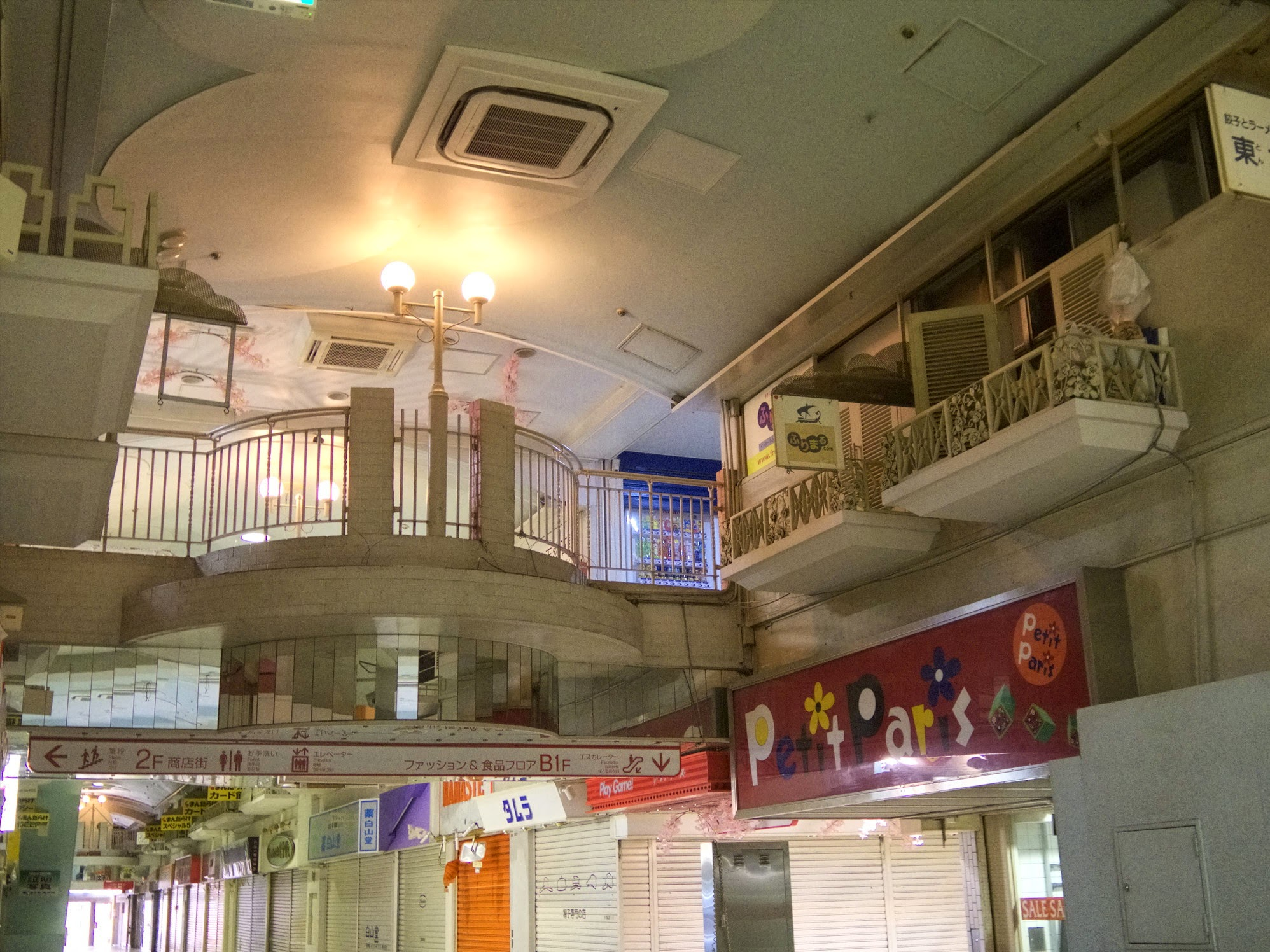
Interior of Nakano Broadway.

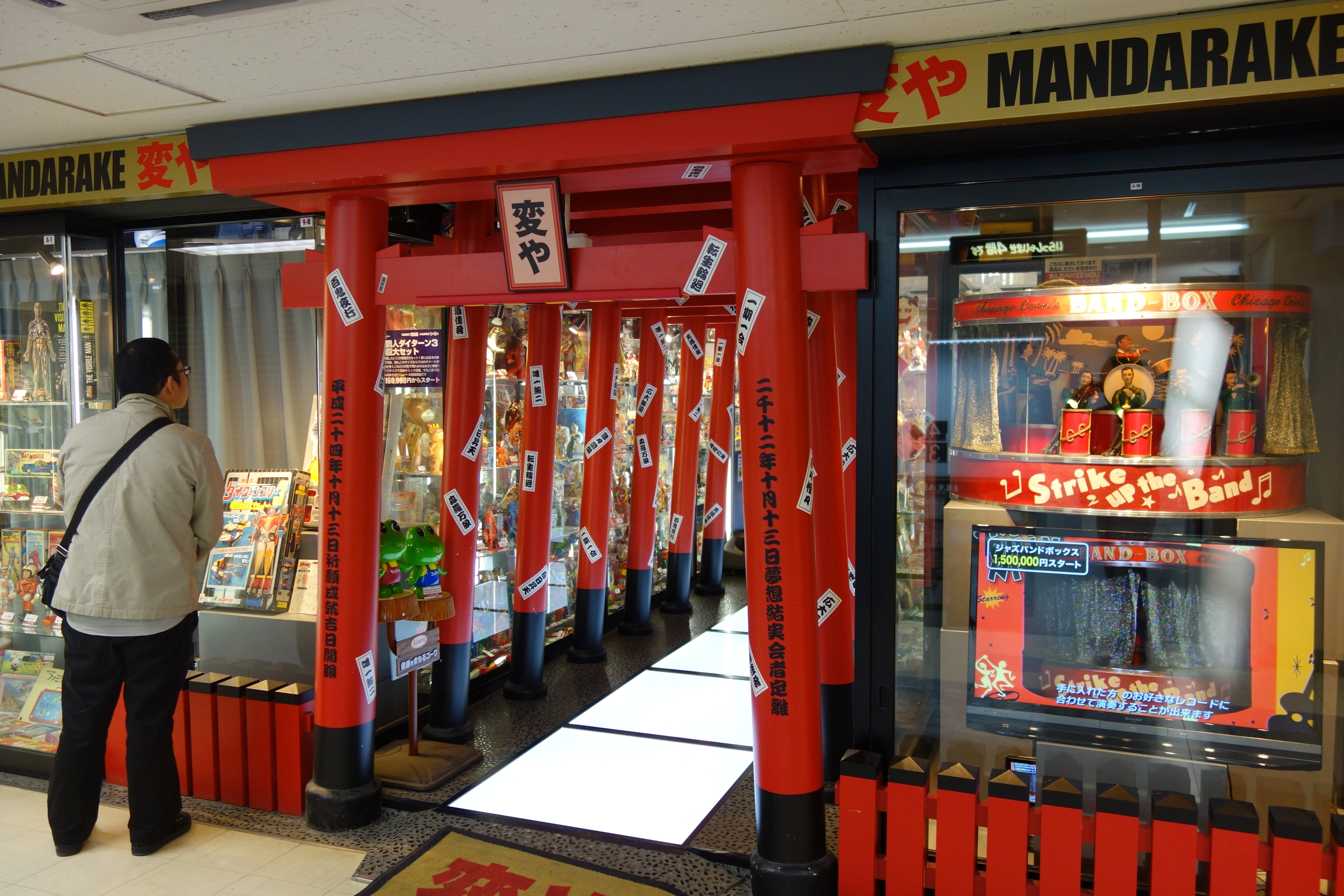
One of 27 Mandarake stores in Nakano Broadway.

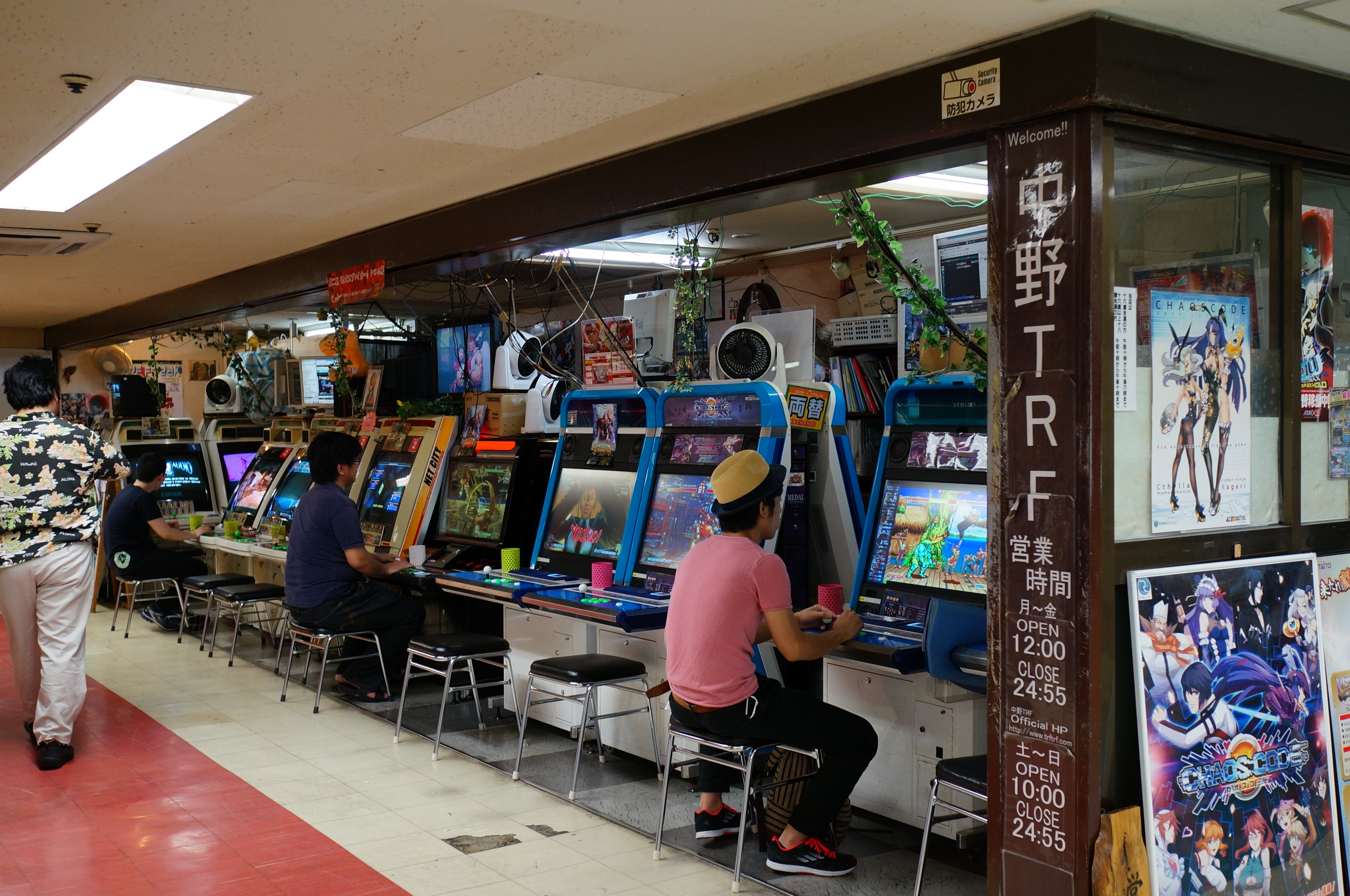
An arcade in Nakano Broadway.

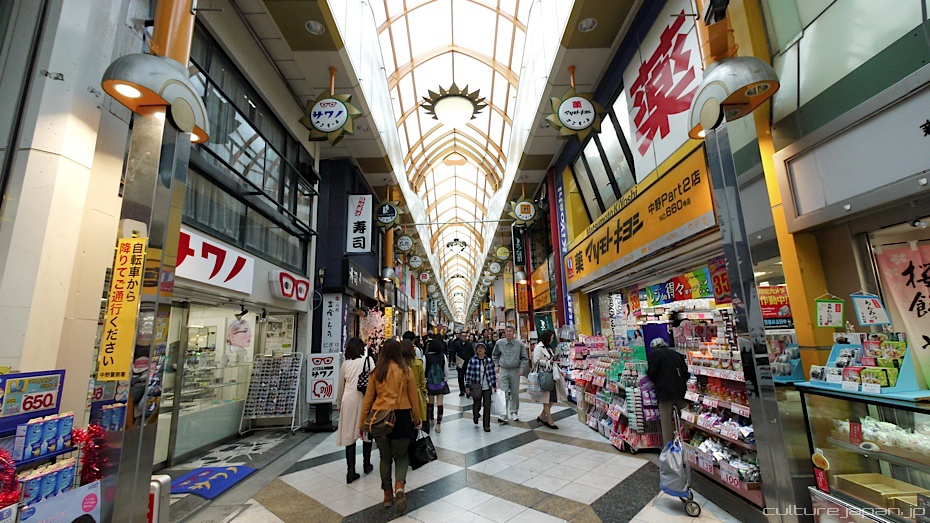
Sun Mall, a glass-covered shopping arcade, connects Nakano Broadway and Nakano Station.
