= Akihabara Radio Kaikan =

- 秋葉原ラジオ会館
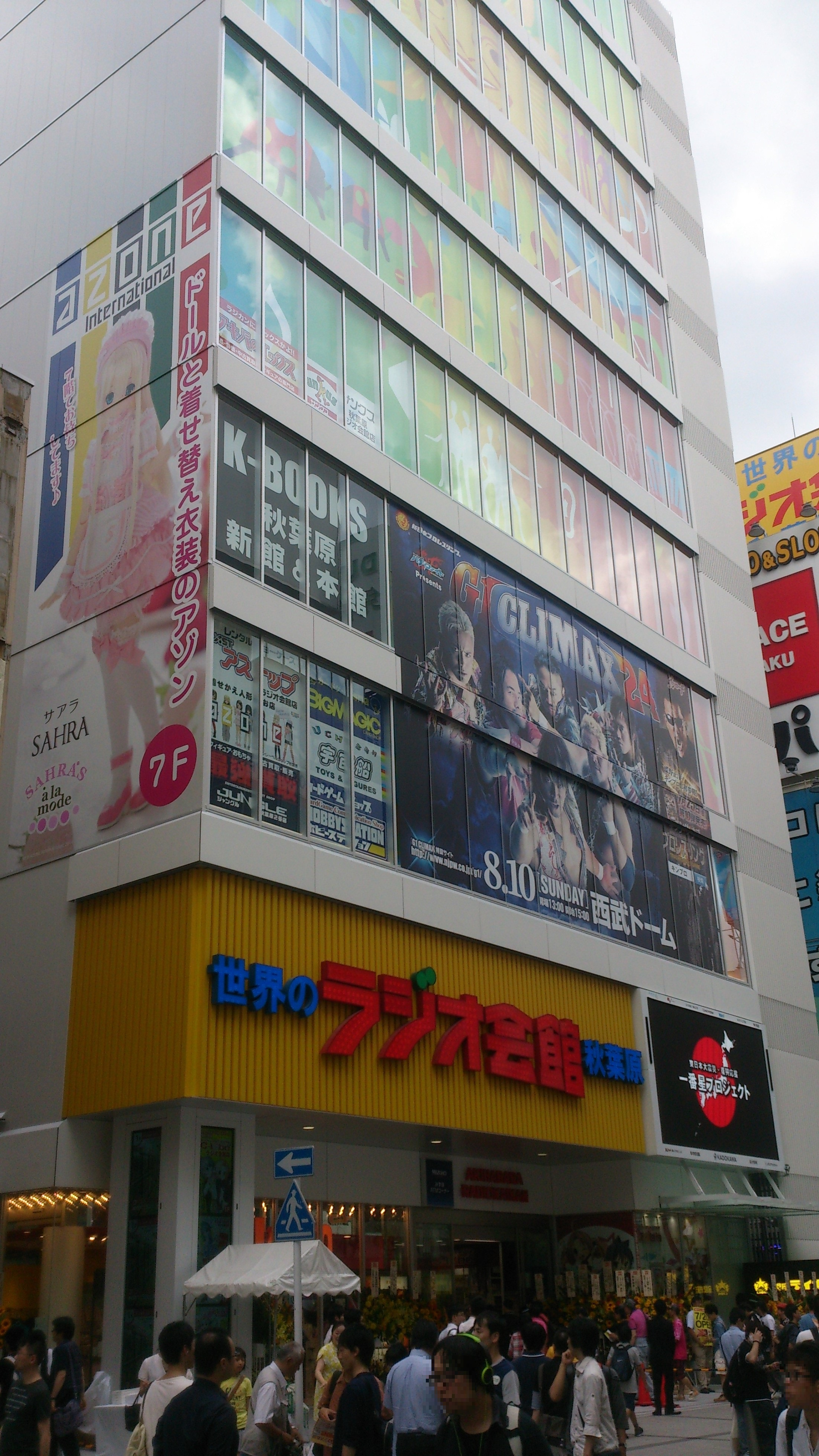
- Akihabara Radio Kaikan in July 2014
- Interactive map of the Akihabara Radio Kaikan area

General information
- Status: Completed
- Type: Commercial building
- Location: Chiyoda, Tokyo, Japan
- Coordinates: 35°41′52″N 139°46′18″E
- Completed: November 1962 (old building)
- Opening: 20 July 2014 (new building)
- Owner: Akihabara Radiokaikan Co., Ltd

Height
- Roof: 46.5 m (153 ft)

Technical details
- Floor count: 10

Website
- www.akihabara-radiokaikan.co.jp

The Akihabara Radio Kaikan (秋葉原ラジオ会館, Akihabara Rajio Kaikan), Akihabara Radio Hall is a commercial building in Tokyo, Japan, and is one of the most well-known landmarks in Akihabara. The recent building was built in 2014 after the old building was demolished in 2011. The building is 46.5 m high, is ten levels from the ground floor and has two basement levels. The current building primarily hosts stores selling otaku goods.

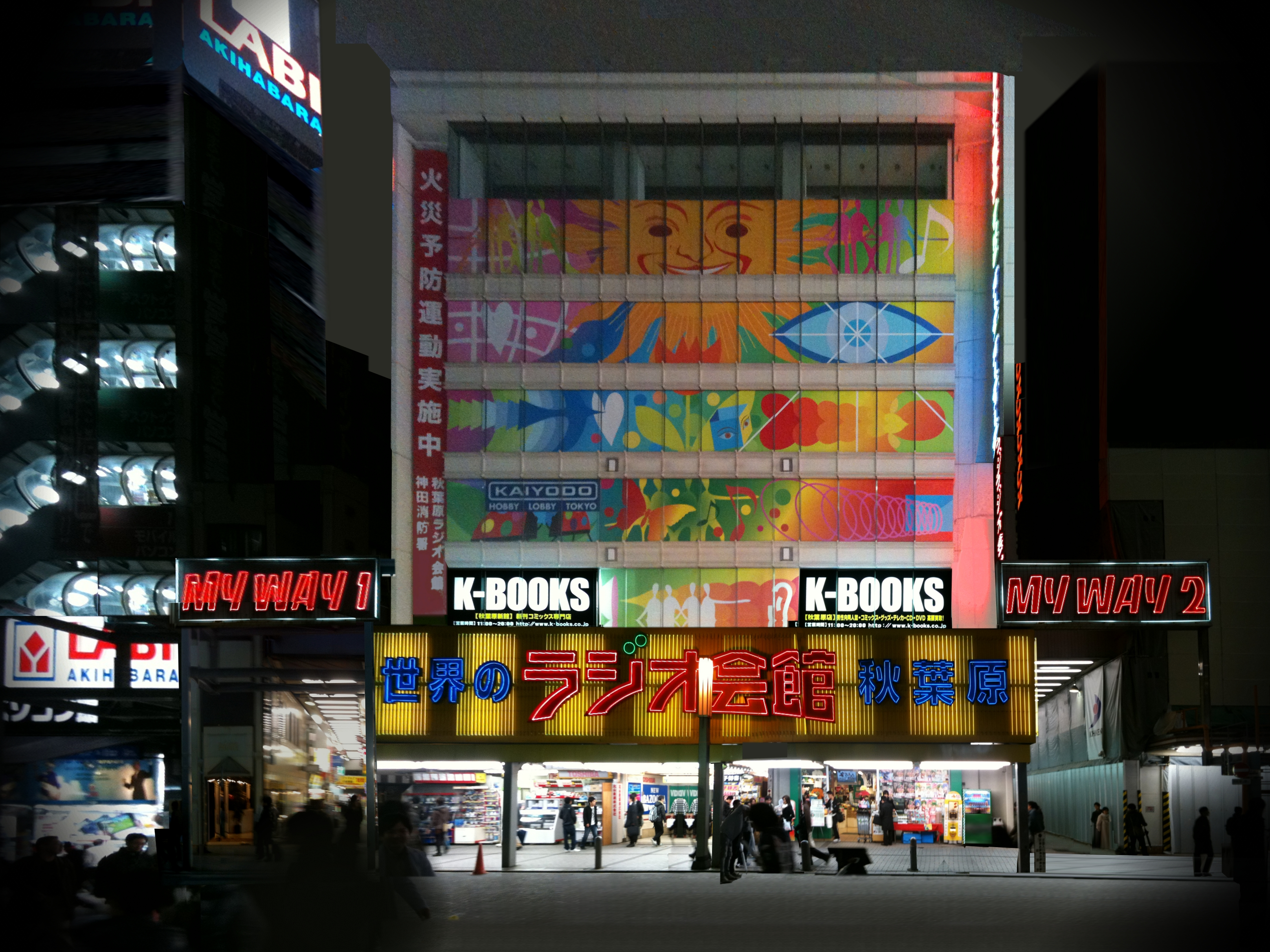
The old building in March 2010.

== History ==
The original eight-story building was constructed in November 1962, making it the first high-rise structure in the Akihabara district. It immediately became a central hub for electronics shops selling components and parts, reflecting Akihabara's primary identity at the time.

=== The epicenter of Japan's microcomputer revolution (1976–1980s) ===
In the late 1970s, the Radio Kaikan, specifically its 7th floor, was recognized as the "epicenter" and "birthplace" of the Japanese personal computer (PC) industry. This revolutionary period was primarily driven by two key tenants on this floor.

In September 1976, NEC opened its dedicated support center, the Bit-INN Tokyo, on the 7th floor to market the pioneering TK-80 microcomputer kit. The TK-80 rapidly exceeded sales expectations, and the Bit-INN served as a vital exchange and gathering space for early microcomputer hobbyists and engineers, marking the true beginning of the country's personal computer boom.

The 7th floor also hosted a key international retailer: a franchise of the pioneering American computer store, Byte Shop. This concentration of early computer retail and support made the Radio Kaikan a frequent gathering point for individuals who would later become key figures in Japan's burgeoning IT industry, including SoftBank Group founder Masayoshi Son and former Microsoft Japan President Makoto Naruke.

=== Cultural shift ===
Following the microcomputer era, shops selling otaku merchandise began moving into the Radio Kaikan as the culture established itself in Akihabara.

=== Demolition and reconstruction ===
Concerns were raised in 2010 regarding the structural integrity of the aging building. The original structure was closed for demolition in August 2011 and replaced by a new building, which opened in July 2014. The new structure is 46.5 m high with ten above-ground levels and two basement levels, and primarily hosts stores catering to the otaku subculture. The new structure, filled with stores specializing in anime, manga, and other otaku merchandise, attracts visitors from around the world, solidifying the area's reputation as the "Holy Land of Otaku Culture".
