= Mango TV (Dominican Republic) =

Dominican music channel

Mango TV is a Dominican music channel founded by Juan Luis Guerra in June 1995. The channel's aim is to promote the local music scene.

== History ==
The channel made international headlines in 2002 for its refusal to air Aserejé in its line-up due to its owner, a born-again Christian, following the theory that the song was satanic.

On April 30, 2003, Juan Luis Guerra decided to sell the channel to Almavision, a US Spanish-language Christian network. The final night under Mango TV consisted of a three-hour farewell broadcast featuring the stars whose careers were kickstarted at the channel. On December 10, 2004, it was announced that Guerra regained the rights of the station, with the former Almavisión República Dominicana shutting down on December 15.

The station resumed UHF broadcasts on channel 69 (cable channel 18) in October 2012. At the time of the decision, there was no information regarding its schedule, as technical facts were being finalized. On February 11, 2013, Mango TV started airing a block of new local music videos.

On March 12, 2023, it aired the Videoclip Awards, which granted a special prize to the channel for its contributions to the local music video scene.
