= Mangoes (TV series) =

- Also known as: مینگوز
- Genre: Drama; Comedy
- Written by: Adeel Suhrwardy; Khurram Suhrwardy
- Directed by: Khurram Suhrwardy
- Starring: Adeel Suhrwardy; Maha Warsi; Khurram Suhrwardy; Jessica Siegner; Anokhi Dalvi
- Narrated by: Adeel Suhrwardy
- Theme music composer: Alamgir; Kristie Yung; (Season 1): Taha Malik; (Season 2)
- Opening theme: Keh Dena (season 1); Desi Swag (season 2)
- Composers: Alamgir; Taha Malik
- Countries of origin: Canada; Pakistan
- Original languages: Urdu; English; Punjabi
- No. of seasons: 2
- No. of episodes: 12

Production
- Producers: Adeel Suhrwardy; Khurram Suhrwardy
- Production locations: Toronto, Ontario, Canada
- Running time: 20 minutes
- Production company: Suhrwardy Brothers

Original release
- Network: ATN Canada; Jadoo TV
- Release: 27 June 2012

Mangoes is a Pakistani Canadian television series directed by Khurram Suhrwardy and produced by Adeel Suhrwardy and Khurram Suhrwardy under the production banner of Suhrwardy Brothers. The story revolves around the lives of young South Asians living in Canada. The series was first premiered on 27 June 2012 on ATN Canada and it ended after seven episodes. The second season began on 29 September 2016 on ATN. The third season Mangoes: a slice of life began in September 2019 on YouTube.

== Plot ==
The story revolves around a group of three friends 2 from Pakistan and 1 from India and their lives in Toronto, Ontario, Canada.

== Cast and characters ==
=== Main cast ===
- Adeel Suhrwardy as Sami
- Maha Warsi as Asha
- Khurram Suhrwardy as Rakkay

== Theme song ==
Keh Dena is the theme song for the series and has become very popular after its release in November 2011. On YouTube the official video of the song has been viewed more than 500,000 times.

It was sung by Canadian singer Kristie Yung as a tribute to Pakistani singer Alamgir. The latter performs the song together with Yung. It was originally recorded by Alamgir in the 80s and was included in his album "Alamgir Sings For Himself".
