= Sainsbury Institute for Art =

Art institute at the University of East Anglia

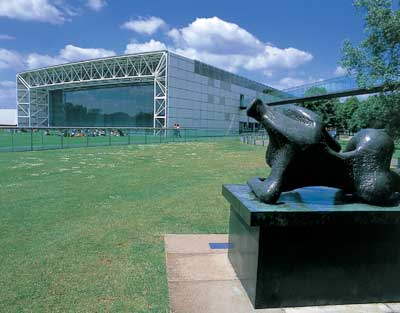
Sainsbury Centre for Visual Arts

The Sainsbury Institute for Art (SIfA) is based in the Sainsbury Centre for Visual Arts at the University of East Anglia in the United Kingdom.

== Organization ==
The Sainsbury Institute for Art is an umbrella organization that brings together the activities and expertise of the Sainsbury Centre for Visual Arts, the School of World Art Studies and Museology (WAM), the Sainsbury Institute for the Study of Japanese Arts and Cultures (SISJAC) and the Sainsbury Research Unit for the Arts of Africa, Oceania and the Americas (SRU).

"The Institute works to develop an integrated approach to art as a global phenomenon through a combination of disciplinary approaches, exhibitions and programming".

SIfA was officially opened on 16 November 2011. Neil MacGregor, Director of the British Museum, gave the inaugural lecture. The institute's study area was designed by Foster and Partners.

=== Centre for Archaeology and Heritage ===
The Sainsbury Institute has among other divisions the Centre for Archaeology and Heritage which was established in 2011. The Centre focuses on research projects in the field of archaeology in Japan as well as the cultural heritage, working as a hub of researchers and students interested in the prehistoric to historic background of Japanese culture.

=== The Lisa Sainsbury Library ===
In 2003, the facilities of the Lisa Sainsbury Library was inaugurated by Orita Masaki, the Ambassador of Japan on the Norwich headquarters of the Sainsbury Institute. Researchers of Japanese studies can make appointment to use the library for reference books and digitized materials.

== Management Board ==
Ex-officio Members

David Richardson, Vice-Chancellor, University of East Anglia (Chair)

Valerie Amos, Baroness Amos

Peter Hesketh

Elizabeth Esteve-Coll

Masatomo Kawai

Non-ex-officio Members

Tim Lankester KCB

Stephen McEnally

David Warren (diplomat)

Ex-officio Participating Observer

Sarah Barrow

Philip Gilmartin

Simon Kaner

Nicole Rousmaniere

Japan based non-ex-officio Participating Observer

Tadashi Kobayashi

== Publications ==
- Koshashin kenkyū = Old photography study. Historical Photography Study Group at Nagasaki University; Nagasaki University Library; Sainsbury Institute for the Study of Japanese Arts and Cultures. Nagasaki, Japan: Nagasaki University Library. 1994. OCLC 835083993.
- Jeffett, William; Pierson, Douglas; Kirili, Alain; Sainsbury Centre for Visual Arts; French Institute (London, England); Talbot Rice Gallery (1994). Alain Kirili, open form sculpture: exhibition. Norwich, England: Sainsbury Centre for Visual Arts, University of East Anglia. ISBN 0946009198.
- セインズベリー日本藝術研究所年次報告書 [Annual Report, Sainsbury Institute for the Study of Japanese Arts and Cultures] (in English and Japanese). Norwich, England: Sainsbury Institute for the Study of Japanese Arts and Cultures.
- Rousmaniere, Nicole Coolidge, ed. (2001). Births and rebirths in Japanese art: essays celebrating the inauguration of the Sainsbury Institute for the Study of Japanese Arts and Cultures. Hotei academic 1, European studies on Japan. Leiden: Hotei Pub. ISBN 9074822444.
- Sainsbury Institute for the Study of Japanese Arts and Cultures (2003). Kazari: decoration and display in Japan, 15th-19th centuries (Videodisc). Neil MacGregor (narrator); Eye to Eye Television (production). Sainsbury Institute for the Study of Japanese Arts and Cultures.
- Sainsbury Institute for the Study of Japanese Arts and Cultures; Nagasaki University Library (2003). Reflecting truth: Japanese photography in the nineteenth century [Old photography study]. Vol. 2. Nagasaki, Japan: Sainsbury Institute for the Study of Japanese Arts and Cultures.
- Carpenter, John T; International Hokusai Research Centre, University of Venice; Art Research Center, Ritsumeikan University (2005). Hokusai and his age: ukiyo-e painting, printmaking and book illustration in late Edo Japan. Amsterdam: Sainsbury Institute for the Study of Japanese Arts and Cultures. ISBN 9074822576.
- 21st Century COE Program: "Kyoto Art Entertainment Creation Research", Ritsumeikan University; Sainsbury Institute for the Study of Japanese Arts and Cultures (2006). Ten'nō no shiika to shōsoku: Shinkan ni miru shoshiki: Fujii Eikan bunko shozō [Imperial calligraphy of premodern Japan: scribal conventions for poems and letters from the palace: the Fujii Eikan Bunko collection] (in Japanese and English). Kyoto; Norwich, UK; London. ISBN 490344600X.
- Kinsella, Sharon (2007). Rush, Barbara; Chūsei Nihon kenkyūjo (eds.). Gendainihon ni okeru dansei-tekina bunka-teki sōzō no naka no josei-teki hanran. Chūsei Nihon Kenkyūjo josei bukkyō bunka-shi kenkyū sentā.
- Cortazzi, Hugh (2009). Japan in late Victorian London: the Japanese native village in Knightsbridge and the Mikado, 1885. Norwich: Sainsbury Institute for the Study of Japanese Arts and Cultures. ISBN 9780954592110.
- Bailey, Douglass W. (Douglass Whitfield); Cochrane, Andrew; Zambelli, Jean (2010). Unearthed: a comparative study of Jōmon dogū and Neolithic figurines. Norwich; Swindon; San Francisco: Sainsbury Institute for the Study of Japanese Arts and Cultures: Sainsbury Centre for Visual Arts: University of East Anglia; Arts and Humanities Research Council, San Francisco State University. ISBN 9780954592127.
- Cortazzi, Hugh (2011). Images of Japan, 1885-1912: scenes, tales and flowers. Norwich: Sainsbury Institute for the Study of Japanese Arts and Cultures. ISBN 9780954592134.
- Cortazzi, Hugh (2013). A miscellany of Japanese sketch books and print albums (1840-1908). Norwich: Sainsbury Institute for the Study of Japanese Arts and Cultures. ISBN 9780954592141.
- Hirano, Akira (2013). Japan: historical images: from the Cortazzi collection. Translated by Wright, Simon. Norwich: Sainsbury Institute for the Study of Japanese Arts and Cultures.: an exhibition catalogue at Embassy of Japan in London, between 24 June and 18 July 2013

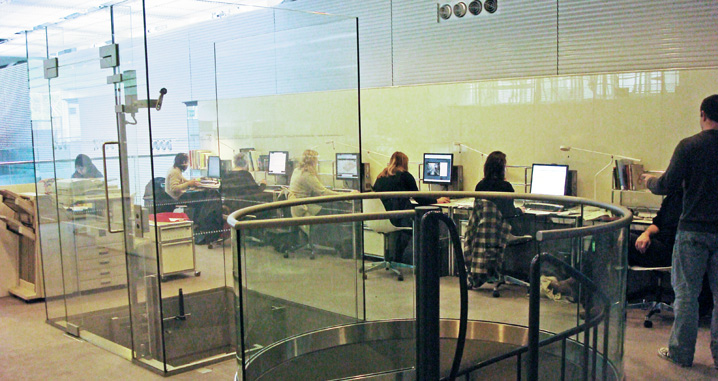
The SIfA mezzanine designed by Foster + Partners
