= Manga (footballer, born 1929) =

Brazilian footballer

Personal information
- Full name: Agenor Gomes
- Date of birth: 26 May 1929
- Place of birth: Vitória, Brazil
- Date of death: 29 February 2004 (aged 74)
- Place of death: Santos, Brazil
- Position: Goalkeeper

Youth career
- –1949: Caxias-ES

Senior career*
Years	Team	Apps	(Gls)
1949–1951	Flamengo		
1950–1951	→ Bonsucesso (loan)		
1951–1959	Santos	404	(0)
1954	→ Bahia (loan)		

Managerial career
- 1957: XV de Piracicaba
- 1964: Portuguesa Santista
- 1966: São Carlos Clube
- 1966–1967: Ferroviária
- 1967–1968: Santo André
- 1969: XV de Piracicaba
- 1980: Sãocarlense
- 1988: Sãocarlense
- * Club domestic league appearances and goals as of 26 August 2023

Agenor Gomes (26 May 1929 – 29 February 2004), mostly known as Manga, was a football player and manager, who played as a goalkeeper.

The nickname "Manga" came from a joke of comparing the shape of Agenor's head with the shape of the fruit mango.

== Playing career ==
Manga is the goalkeeper with most appearances for Santos FC, with 404 matches.

== Managerial career ==
Started his managerial career even before retiring as a goalkeeper, with XV de Piracicaba. In 1967, Manga become the first manager of EC Santo André.

== Honours ==
=== Player ===
Santos

- Campeonato Paulista: 1955, 1956, 1958, 1960
- Torneio Rio-São Paulo: 1959
- Teresa Herrera Trophy: 1959

=== Manager ===
Portuguesa Santista

- Campeonato Paulista Série A2: 1964

Ferroviária

- Campeonato Paulista Série A2: 1966
