= Comic Takaoka =

Former manga store in Tokyo

Coordinates: 35°41′45.0″N 139°45′31.2″E

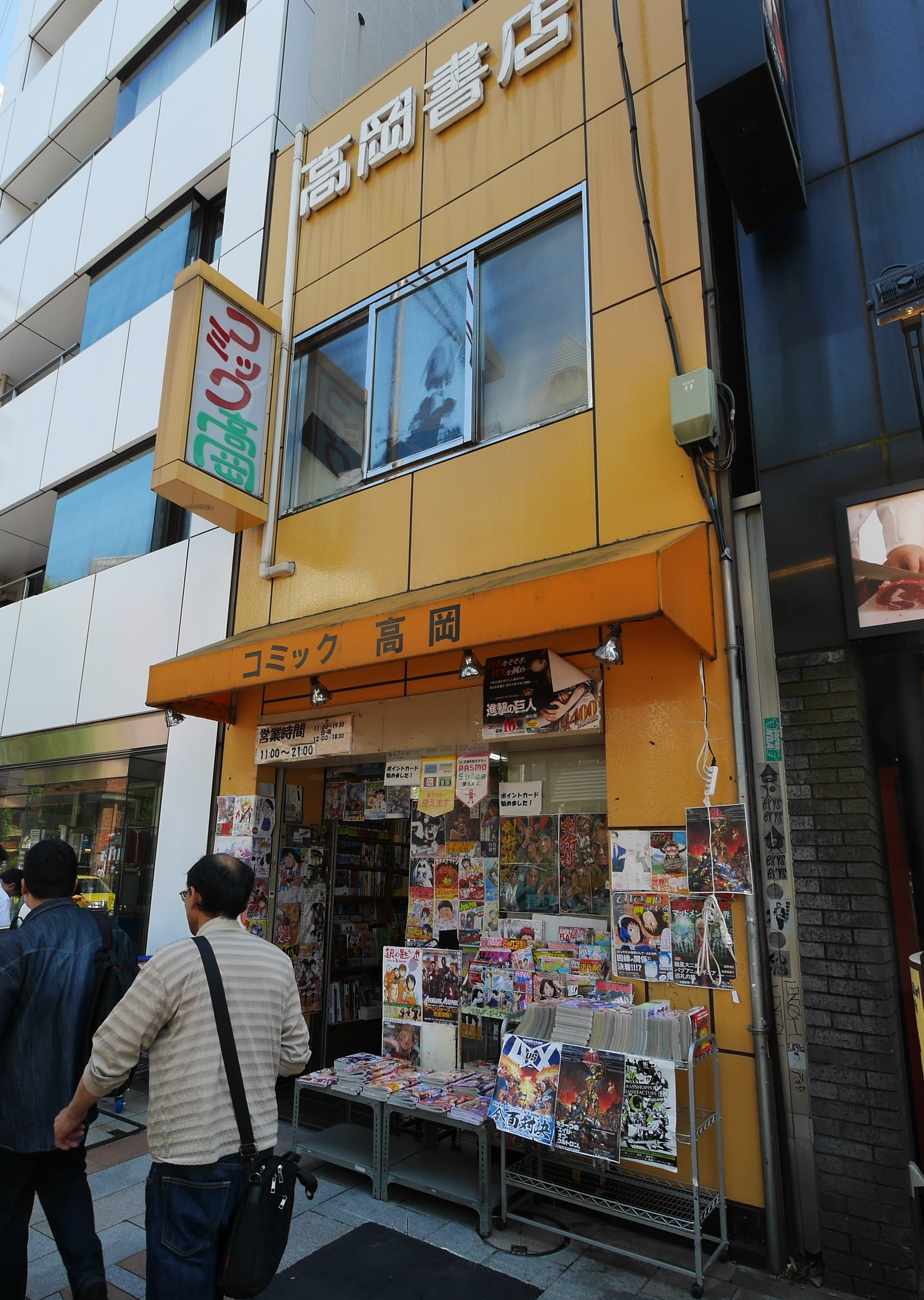
- Comic Takaoka in June 2015
- Native name: コミック高岡
- Formerly: Takaoka Shoten
- Type: Joint-stock
- Industry: Manga
- Founded: 1880
- Founders: Yasutarou Takaoka; Torajiro Takaoka
- Defunct: March 31, 2019
- Headquarters: Jinbōchō, Tokyo, Japan

Comic Takaoka (Japanese: コミック高岡, Hepburn: Komikku Takaoka) was a manga and comic book store in Jinbōchō, Tokyo, Japan. Opened in 1880 as a general bookstore under the name Takaoka Shoten (Japanese: 高岡書店; Takaoka Bookstore), the store changed its name after it began selling manga exclusively in 1979. Comic Takaoka is noted as one of the first specialty manga bookstores and, prior to its closure in 2019, was one of the longest continually-operating manga bookstores in Japan.

== History ==
The store opened in 1880 under the name Takaoka Shoten, where it operated as a general used bookstore. The store was founded by Yasutarou Takaoka and Torajiro Takaoka, two brothers who moved to Tokyo from Gifu Prefecture; the brothers later entered the publishing industry, where they focused on publishing reference books by mathematician Taketaro Akiyama and scientist Ayao Kuwaki. The store closed during the Second World War before re-opening as a joint-stock company in 1948, and after beginning to sell manga exclusively in 1979, changed its name to Comic Takaoka.

Upon re-establishing itself as Comic Takaoka, the store became one of the first specialty manga bookstores in Japan. Comic Takaoka developed a reputation as "one of the most iconic manga stores in Tokyo" for its sale of a wide breadth of manga, from works by major publishers to niche otaku books. The store was one of the few manga-focused stores in Jinbōchō, a district in Tokyo noted for its high volume of used bookstores, where it was distinguished by its bright yellow facade. At its peak of popularity in the mid-1980s, Comic Takaoka reported selling 1,700 books per day.

In February 2019, Comic Takaoka announced that it would close on March 31, 2019. The Japanese publishing recession, the proliferation of e-books, and the rising cost of rent in Jinbōchō were cited as causes for the closure. That same year, the British Museum included a virtual recreation of Comic Takaoka in its exhibit The Citi Exhibition: Manga on the history of manga.
