= Book Off =

Japanese chain of used bookstores

Book Off (ブックオフコーポレーション)
- Type: Bookstore
- Industry: Retail
- Founded: August 1, 1991
- Founder: Takashi Sakamoto
- Headquarters: Sagamihara, Kanagawa, Japan
- Area served: Worldwide
- Products: Second-hand books, magazines, manga, CDs, DVDs, video games, video game consoles, mobile phones and portable media players

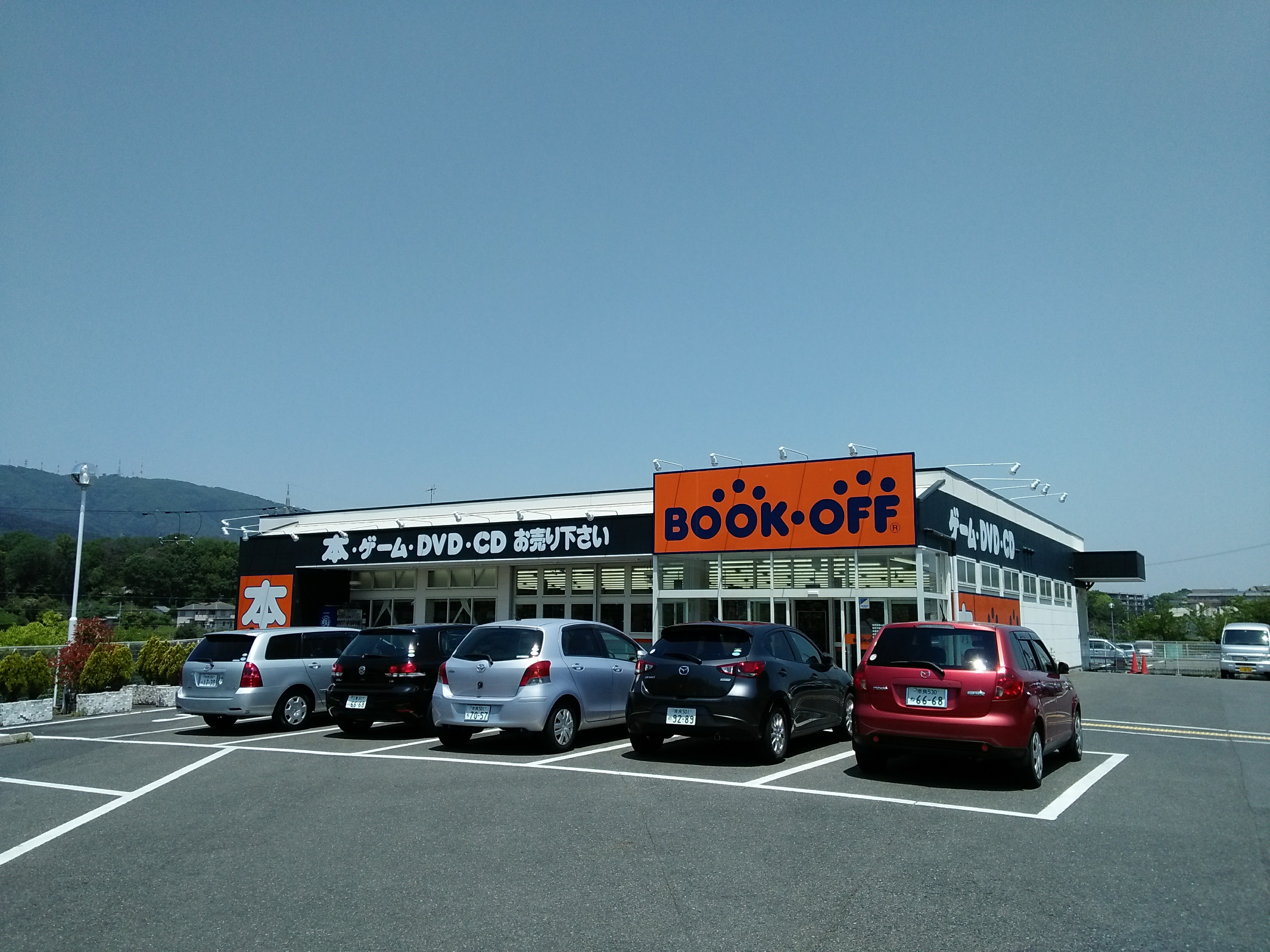
Book Off in Higashiyama, Nara

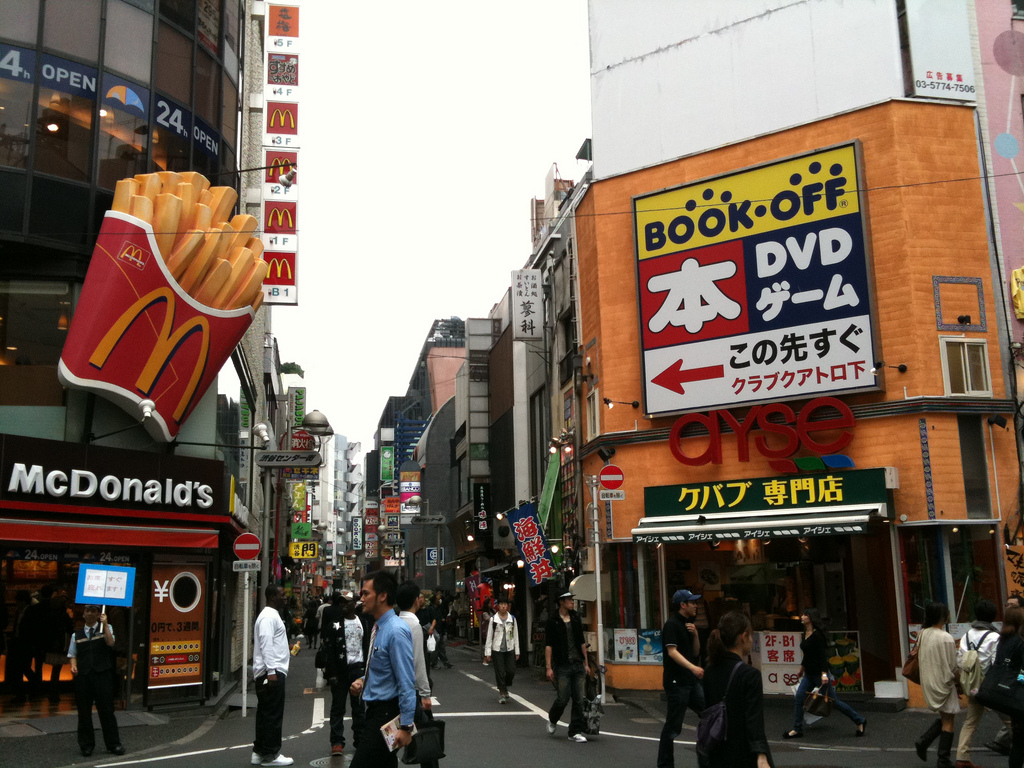
Book Off in Shibuya

Book Off (ブックオフコーポレーション, Bukku Ofu Kōporēshon) (TYO: 3313), stylized as BOOKOFF, is Japan's largest chain of used bookstores. Founded in August 1991, the company has had explosive success, expanding to over 850 stores throughout Japan and several overseas locations. In addition to books, its chains also sell manga, CDs, DVDs, video games, and used video game consoles, mobile phones, portable media players, and sports equipment. Stores are distinguished by their large surface area, cleanliness, and bright illumination.

== Operations ==
Book Off stores are large and browsing is encouraged. Another innovation cited for its success is the practice of shaving the edges off the pages of books using a special machine in order to make them appear newer. By offering a wide selection of books that appear like new at reduced prices, Book Off has aggressively targeted conventional bookstore chains, which since 1953 have been unable to discount new and near-new books and other media due to government regulations which enable a publisher's cartel.

Book Off is frequently cited as a rare example of a corporation that was able to grow during the so-called "lost decade" of economic stagnation that followed the collapse of the Japanese asset price bubble, through its use of innovative business strategies. It expanded from merely used books to used second-hand merchandise through its Hard Off stores, and to the video rental market through Tsutaya.

In October 2026, Book Off Group Holdings reported that unauthorized access to a subsidiary's membership management system may have exposed up to approximately 6.43 million member records, including names and addresses. The company said payment information was not stored in the affected system.

== Brands ==
The Book Off group includes a range of sister brands. These brands are not affiliated with the Book Off Group, but instead with the Hard Off Corporation.

- Hard Off, selling electronic goods and hardware (also known as Eco Tek in the United States)
- Off House, selling household items
- Hobby Off, selling hobby related goods
- Mode Off, selling used fashion
- Garage Off
- Liquor Off, selling discount liquor

== International stores ==
Book Off also operates several stores in the United States, two in Seoul and three in Paris. In the United States there are four stores in New York, ten in California, two in Hawaii, and one in Arizona and Michigan. There are eight stores in Malaysia operating under the Jalan Jalan Japan brand. Also, a Hard Off and a Hobby Off, operate in Taiwan.

=== Former ===
In 2012, it closed its only Canadian store in Vancouver, British Columbia. It was previously opened in July 2005.

== Gallery ==
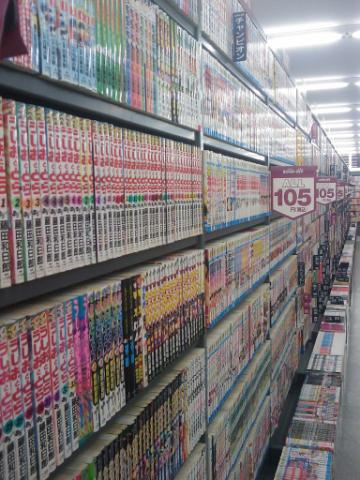
Manga volumes on shelves at Book Off

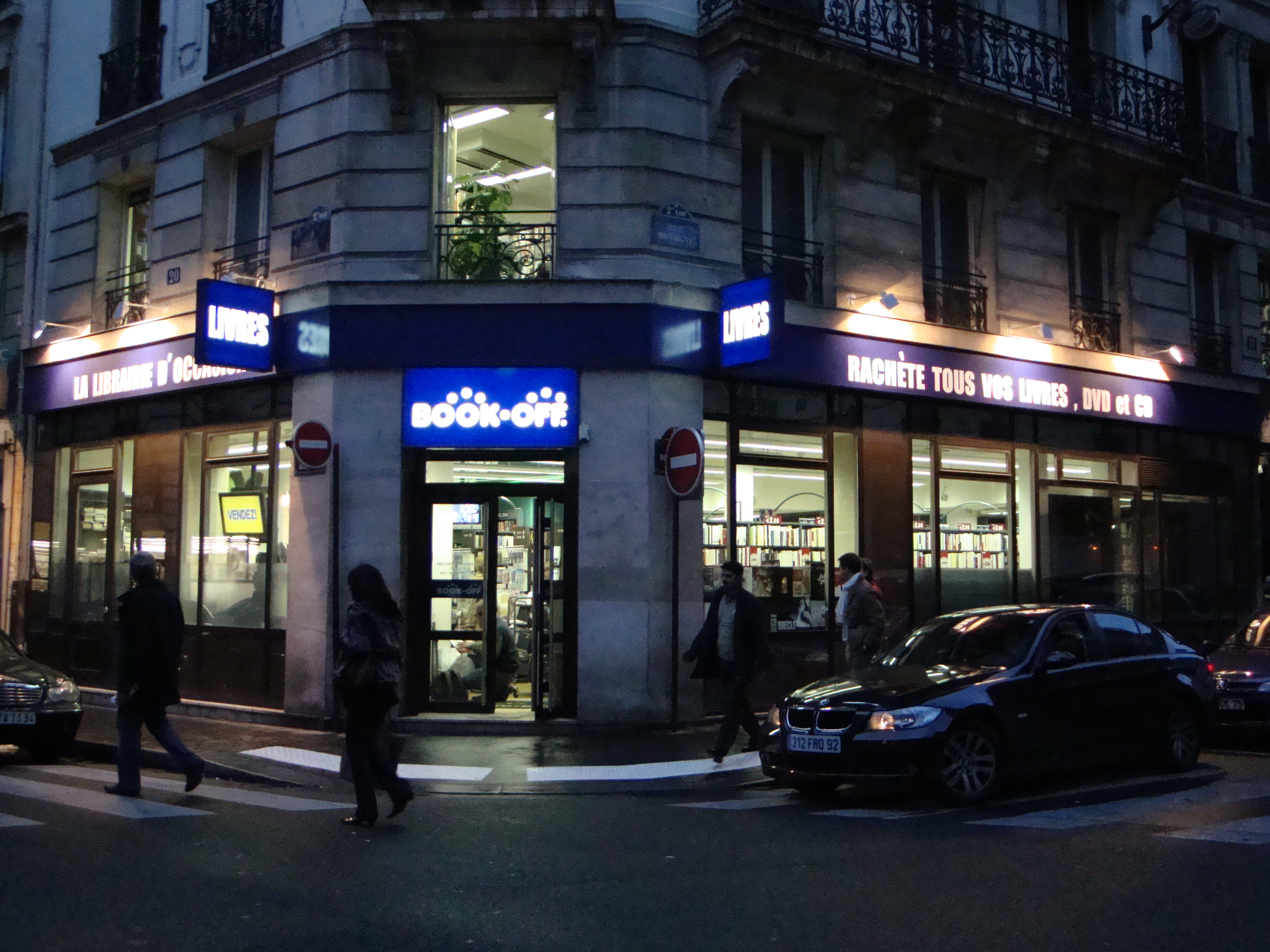
Book Off store near Opéra in Paris

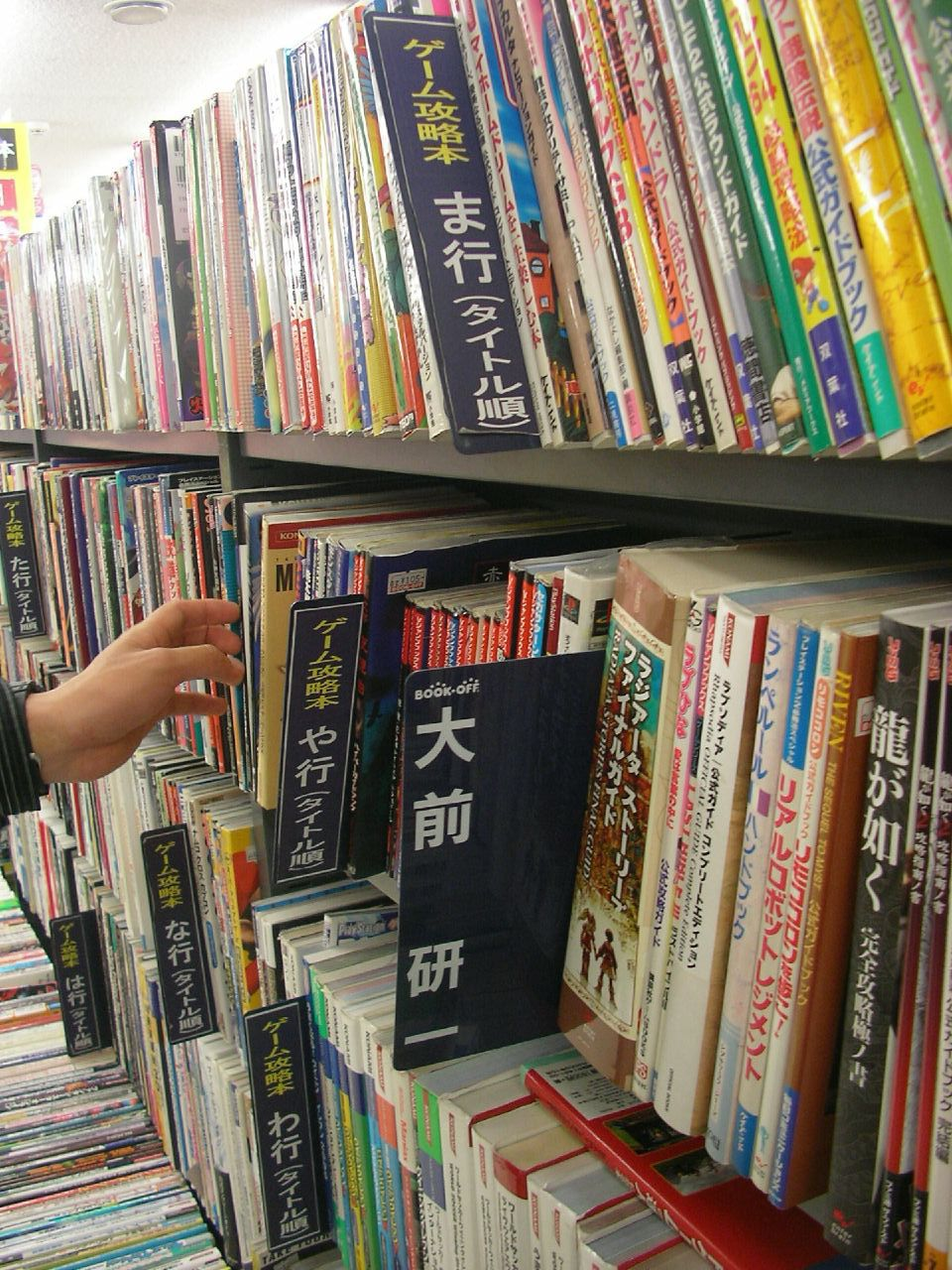
Video game book section at a Book Off store
