= Comic Toranoana =

Japanese company

Toranoana Inc.
- Type: Kabushiki kaisha
- Founded: July 22, 1996
- Headquarters: Akihabara, Chiyoda, Tokyo, Japan
- Area served: Japan, Taiwan
- Products: Books, magazines
- Revenue: JPN 20,000,000
- Website: www.toranoana.jp

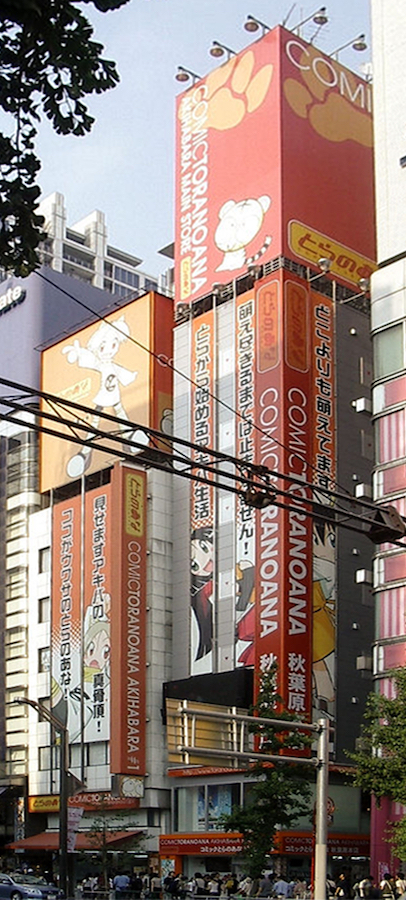
Toranoana Akihabara

Comic Toranoana (コミックとらのあな) is a dōjin shop operated by the Toranoana Inc. (株式会社 虎の穴). This shop specializes in selling manga-related items. It is also known by the name, "Toranoana", or simply, "Tora".

== History ==
In 1996, the company was established as a yugen kaisha. Soon the company expanded, with Akihabara as a center of this expansion, to many places in Tokyo and other large cities. Then in 2003, the company was converted into a kabushiki kaisha.

== Name ==
The name, "Toranoana", comes from the name of the professional wrestling company of the same name in the anime series Tiger Mask.

== List of stores ==
Currently, there is only 1 store in Japan since 2022. Others closed a few years ago, mainly due to the COVID-19 pandemic.

=== Japan ===
- Ikebukuro store (Tokyo)

=== Taiwan ===
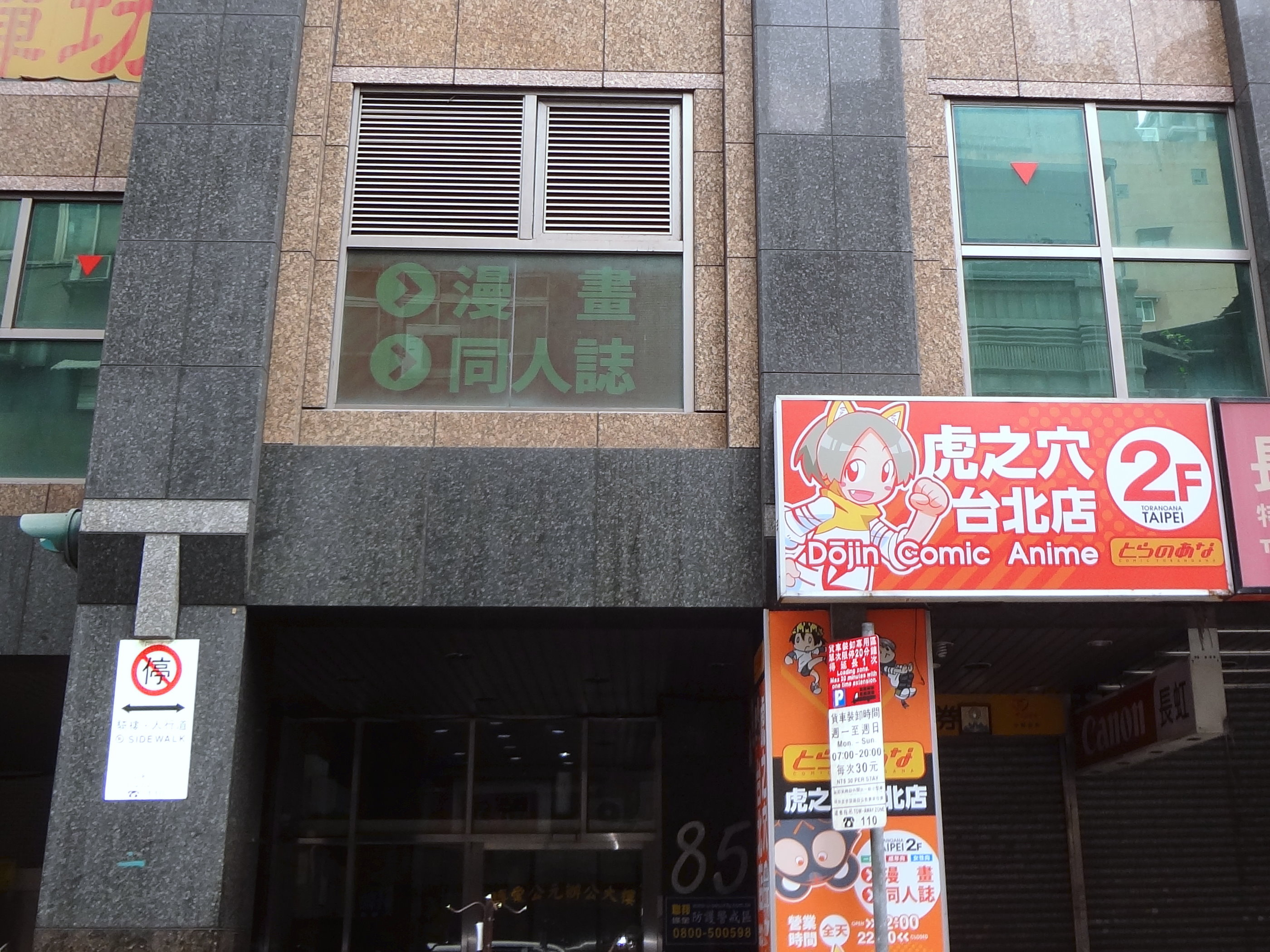
Toranoana Taipei Store

- Taipei store (Taipei)
