= Shark Island =

Shark Island may refer to:

== Places ==
- Cocos Island, Costa Rica
- Shark Island, Namibia, off the coast of Namibia
  - Shark Island Concentration Camp, at Shark Island, Namibia
- Shark Island (Port Jackson), in Sydney Harbour, Australia
- Shark Island (Cronulla Beach), a semi-tidal rock ledge and bodyboarding spot in Sydney, Australia
- Tiburón Island, literally Shark Island, in the gulf of California, Mexico
- Shark Island, County Down, a townland in County Down, Northern Ireland
- Inishark, also called Shark Island, off the coast of County Galway, Ireland

== Other uses ==
- Shark Island (band), 1980s rock band from Los Angeles
- Shark Island, an album released in 1983 by electronic band Basking Sharks

== See also ==
- The Prisoner of Shark Island, a 1936 film
