= Afrikanisches Viertel =

Neighborhood in Berlin, Germany

Coordinates: 52.55°N 13.34°E

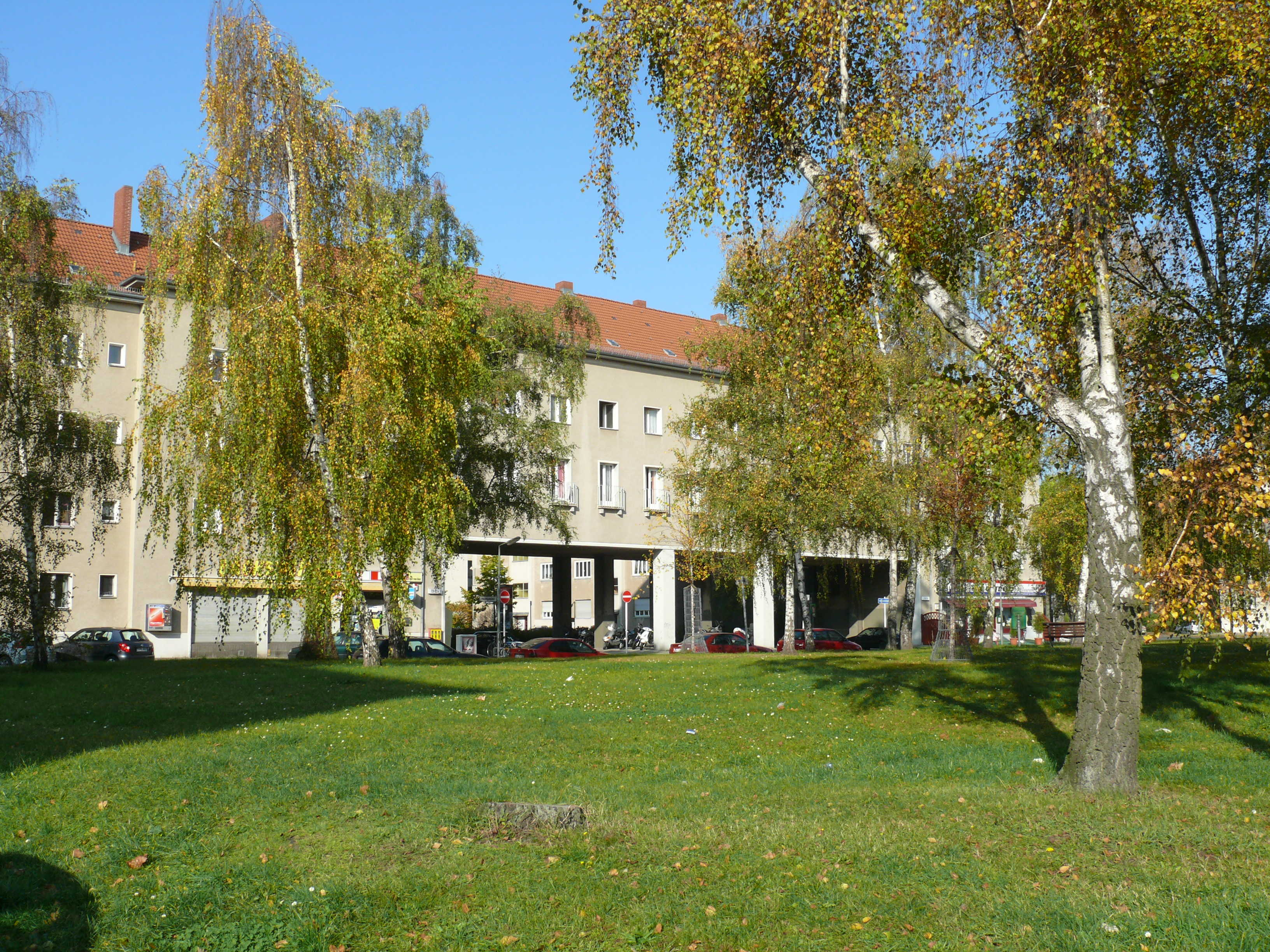
Residences on Manga-Bell-Platz

The Afrikanisches Viertel (English: African Quarter) is a neighborhood in Wedding, a locality of Mitte, Berlin, Germany. It is bounded by Müllerstraße, Seestraße, Volkspark Rehberge, Goethepark, and the border with the neighboring borough of Reinickendorf.

A large number of streets have names related to Africa, particularly parts of Africa that were involved in the German colonization of Africa. These include Afrikanische Straße, Anna-Mungunda-Allee, Cornelius-Fredericks-Straße, Damarastraße, Dualastraße, Ghanastraße, Guineastraße, Kameruner Straße, Kongostraße, Maji-Maji-Allee, Mohasistraße, Otawistraße, Sambesistraße, Sansibarstraße, Senegalstraße, Swakopmunder Straße, Tangastraße, Togostraße, Transvaalstraße, Ugandastraße, Usambarastraße, and Windhuker Straße, along with Manga-Bell-Platz.

== Naming ==
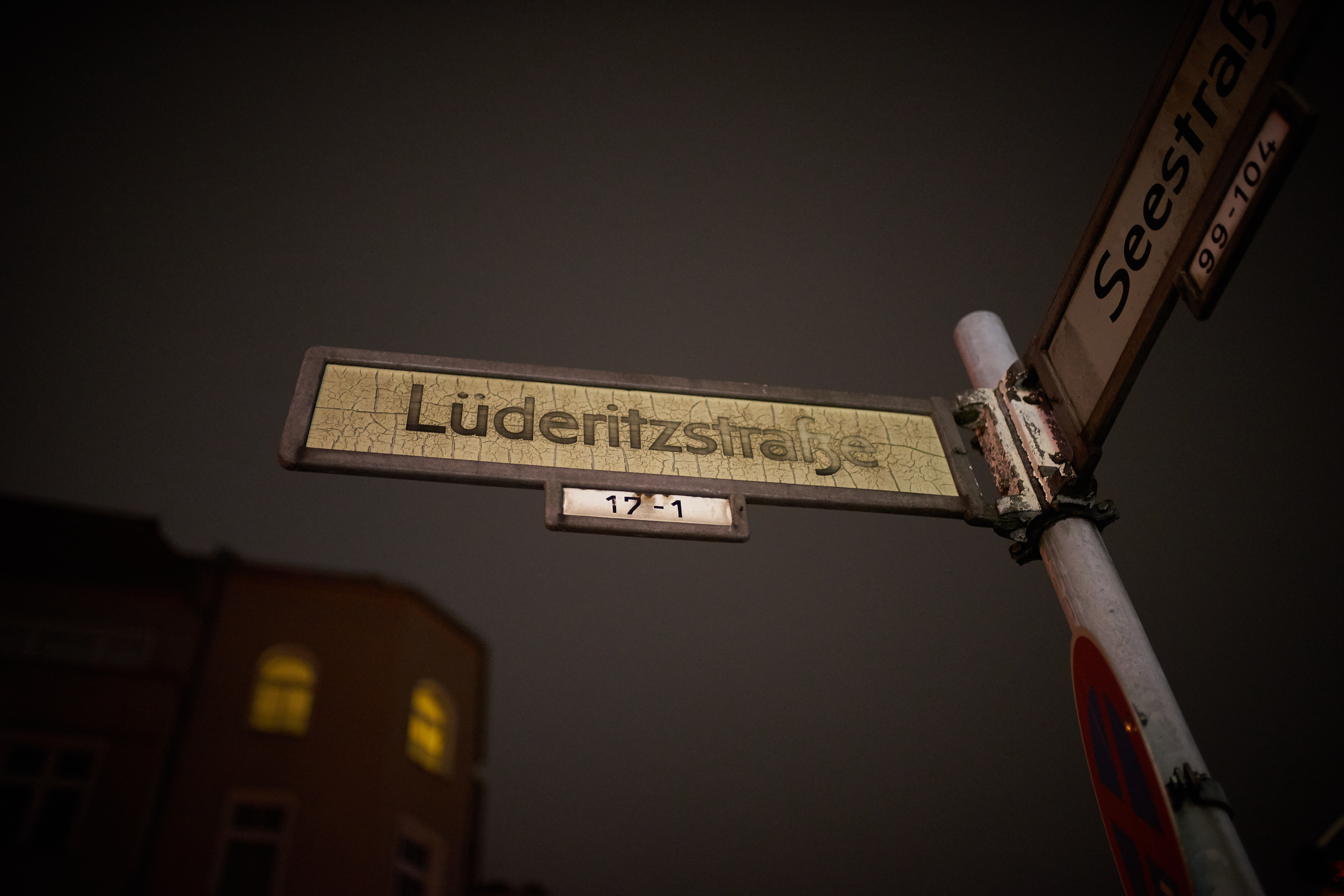
Street sign for Lüderitzstraße, named after Adolf Lüderitz; now named Cornelius-Fredericks-Straße

Prior to the First World War, Carl Hagenbeck planned the creation of a new zoo similar to his Tierpark Hagenbeck in Hamburg on the grounds of what is today Volkspark Rehberge, including also a human zoo featuring peoples from Germany's overseas colonies. The war interrupted these plans, but the streets had largely been named by that point.

A number of streets have been the point of controversy in the African Quarter. In particular, the streets named after Germans who were involved in colonizing parts of Africa, such as Lüderitzstraße, Petersallee, and Nachtigalplatz, which have been the target of occasional renaming initiatives. These names were criticized as discriminatory relics of colonialism and imperialism, honoring colonial figures who have since undergone historical re-evaluation. In 1986, Petersallee was re-dedicated to Hans Peters, a resistance fighter against Nazism, but the name remained unchanged. New names were agreed on in 2018: Petersallee will be split and its successors named after the Maji Maji Rebellion and Anna Mungunda, Lüderitzstraße from 2 December 2022 bears the name of Cornelius Fredericks, and Nachtigalplatz is re-named Manga-Bell-Platz, after Emily and Rudolf Duala Manga Bell.

Since the late 1990s, over 1,000 African immigrants have moved to the African Quarter (predominantly from Ghana, Cameroon, and Nigeria), for an estimated total of 2,500 citizens of various African nations officially residing in the quarter, although this figure does not include naturalized African immigrants or their children. Of Berlin's 20,000 legally registered residents of African heritage, a large portion lives in Wedding and neighboring Tiergarten.

== Architecture ==
Many of the buildings in the Afrikanisches Viertel date back to the 1920s and 1930s. The area is also home to the Friedrich-Ebert-Siedlung, as well as four buildings along Afrikanische Straße between Sambesistraße and Seestraße designed by Ludwig Mies van der Rohe.
