= List of ports in Namibia =

This list of Ports and harbours in Namibia details the ports, harbours around the coast of Namibia.

== List of ports and harbours in Namibia ==
Port/Harbour name	Region	Town name	Coordinates	Remarks
Port of Walvis Bay	Erongo Region	Walvis Bay	22°56′S 14°30′E	Large-sized port and major port of Namibia.
Port of Lüderitz	ǁKaras Region	Lüderitz	26°38′S 15°09′E	Medium-sized port. It is developed around Robert Harbour and Shark Island. The maximum draught of the port is 7.9 meters.
Port of Swakopmund	Erongo Region	Swakopmund	22°41′S 14°32′E	
