= Rotaprint =

Rotaprint was a company manufacturing offset litho printing presses located in Berlin, Germany from 1904 to 1989. At the height of its activities it employed about 1,000 workers making it one of the largest employers in the Wedding district of Berlin.
