= Anna Mungunda =

Namibian heroine (1932–1959)

Anna "Kakurukaze" Mungunda (1932 – 10 December 1959) was a Namibian woman of Herero descent. She was the only woman among the casualties of the Old Location uprising in Windhoek on 10 December 1959. Since Namibia's independence on 21 March 1990, Mungunda is regarded one of the heroes of the Namibian nation.

== Biographical elements ==
Mungunda was born in 1932 to migrant labourer Theopoldt Shivute and Emilia Kavezeri, a niece of Hosea Kutako,a key figure in. the Herero Resistance. She had three siblings, all of whom died during their infancy.

Anna Mugunda lived in Widhoek's Old Location, which served as the primary residential area from Africans in South West Africa. It was also a neighborhood where homes were private property of their occupant, who paid a small monthly fee for the use of the land. This form of ownership stood in contrast to that of the new township Katutura, where housing would be offered solely on a rental basis by the municipality.

In 1959, South West Africa was under South African mandate. The Verwoerd government's decision to implement apartheid laws there ( including the Group Areas Act) by creating new suburbs in northwestern Windhoek to forcibly displace and resettle all Black residents, sparked protests and riots during the first half of December 1959. More than a dozen people were killed by security forces, including Anna Mungunda.

== Context of the Old Location Uprising ==
Since 1955, The Windhoek municipality had been planning to relocate the entire population of the Old Location to a new township, Katutura, situated approximately seven kilometers north of the city center. The residents opposed this move for several reasons: the loss of property, a rising cots of living resulting from new rents and daily bus fares, and a refusal to accept the enforcement of apartheid laws within a territory that was, in fact, under international mandate

On October 29, 1959, a public meeting drew a crowd of approximately 3,000 people. Representatives from the Herero, Damara, and Ovambo communities rejected the forced relocation. One of the representatives, Hosea Kutako, declared: "If you wish to force us, you will have to carry our corpses to Katutura".

== Uprising of December 10, 1959 ==
Fllowing a gathering of residents from the Old Location, held after the arrest of one of the township's inhabitants, the police opened fire in the civilians.Sources disagree on what exactly happened to Mungunda, who was employed as a domestic worker, on the day of the Old Location uprising. It is reported that the fatal shooting of her only son, Kaaronda Mungunda, enraged her so much that she ran towards the car of a high-ranking administrator, poured petrol over it, and set it alight. The car either belonged to mayor Jaap Snyman or to Old Location Police Superintendent de Wet. Both cars were set alight during the demonstration. She was shot dead during or immediately after this action.

Anna Mungunda is one of nine national heroes of Namibia that were identified at the inauguration of the country's Heroes' Acre near Windhoek. Founding president Sam Nujoma remarked in his inauguration speech on 26 August 2002 that:

On that fateful day [of the Old Location uprising], twelve peaceful demonstrators were killed and more than fifty others were injured. In the face of this brutality, a courageous and fearless young woman by the name of Kakurukaze Mungunda demonstrated her bravery and heroism by setting alight the car of De Wet who was the superintendent of the Windhoek Old Location. She was shot on the spot and Killed in cold blood by the South African apartheid repressive police. To her revolutionary spirit and his visionary memory we humbly offer our honour and respect.

== Memory and Posterity ==
Anna Mugunda is the first Namibian woman on record as having died in a direct conflict with South African authorities. This explains, in part, why her figures looms so large today in the collective memory of the liberation struggle, at the expense of the women organized the protest march of December 4th and whose name are now largely forgotten

=== Absence of image for decades ===
During the years of struggle in exile following the uprising, no photograph of Anna Mugunda was available to accompany the accounts published in SWAPO publications. Her story was therefore transmitted solely through written and oral narrations, often in the form of chronological accounts. Yet, this absence of photograph did not prevent Anna Mungunda from becoming a prominent figure in the struggle. Martha Akawa, in her study on women in the Namibian liberation struggle, notes that during her research interview, the majority of her respondents would spontaneously begin by recounting Anna's story when asked about the role of women in the struggle. It was only after the erection of her symbolic tomb at the Heroes' Acre in 2001 that her family provided an image of her for the first time.

Mungunda is honoured in form of a granite tombstone with her name engraved and her portrait plastered onto the slab.`

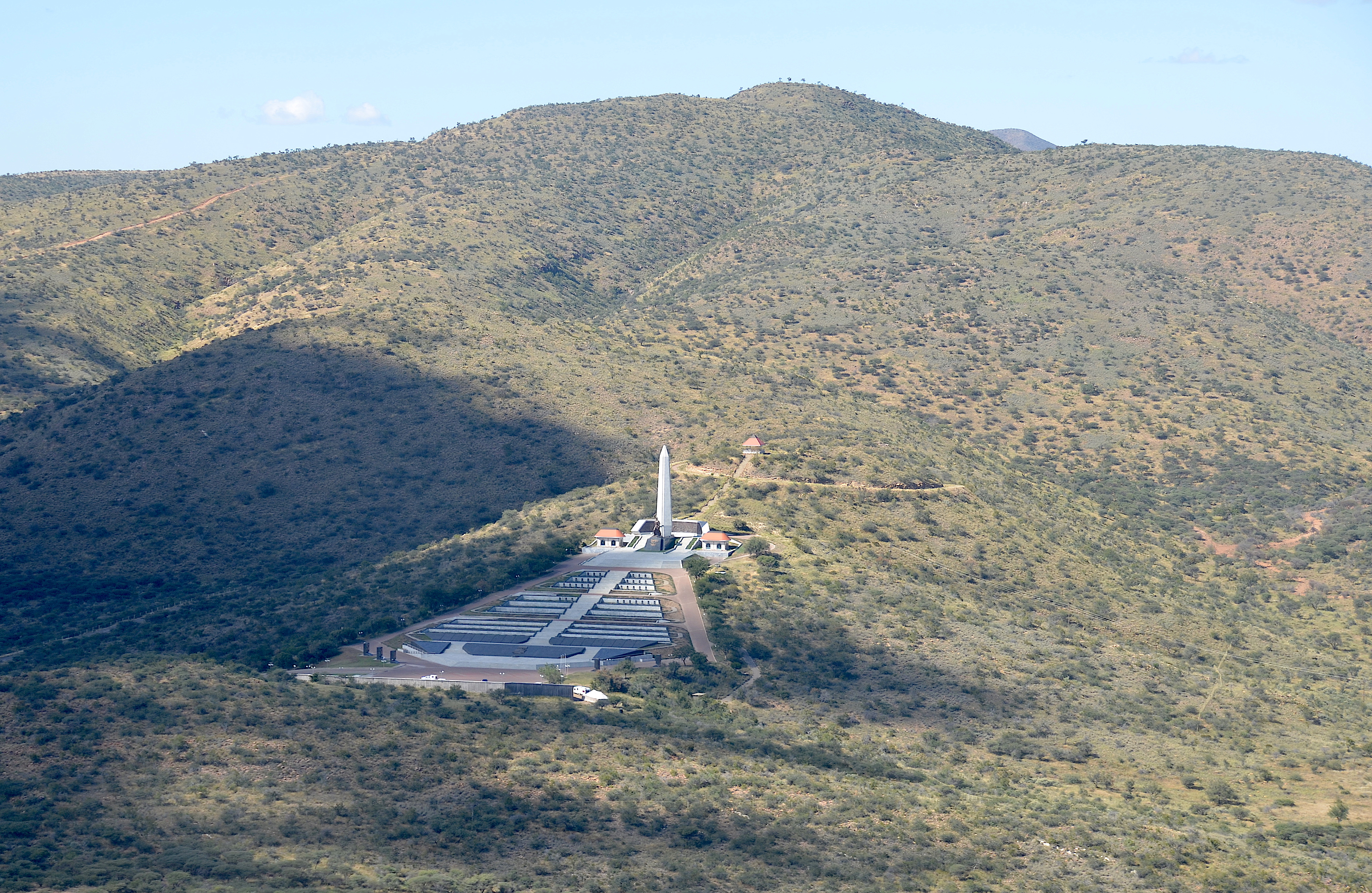
Aerial view of Heroes' Acre, Windhoek, Namibia ( 2017). Anna Mungunda has been honored there with a symbolic grave since the inauguration of the memorial on August 26, 2002

Of the fourteen people honored at Heroes' Acre during its inauguration in 2002, Anna Mungunda is one of only two women represented. The other woman honored is Gertrude Katanga- Hilukilua, who was present at the ceremony.

=== December 10th as SWAPO Women's Day ===
While in exile, SWAPO designated December 10th on its calendar as "Women's Day", distinct from International Women's Day on March 8th. This commemoration was subsequently celebrated annually in Namibian refugee camps, particularly in Angola and Zambia. Each year, the movement's publications featured articles, poems, and profiles dedicated to women. During a rally in 1987, Sam Nujoma declared: " This day in December is an unforgettable day in the history of our struggle for the liberation of Namibia, a day of rededication, resolve, and respect for our heroes and heroines."

== Places named after her ==
Several places are named after Anna Mungunda. In Namibia: a street in Katutura (Windhoek), a Namibian Navy patrol boat, and the former bachelor's market in the Soweto neighborhood of Katutura. During the years of exile struggle, a nursery in the large SWAPO camp in Kwanza Sul, Angola, which housed up to 43,000 Namibian refugees in 1998, was also named after her.

Her name has also been given to a street in Berlin, in the Afrikanisches Viertel (African Quarter). This street was previously named after Carl Peters, a German explorer of Africa and one of the main organizers of German colonization, known for his brutality towards local populations. It now officially bears two different names: one part is named after Anna Mungunda, Anna-Mungunda-Allee, the other is called Maji-Maji-Allee in honor of a Tanzanian anti-colonial movement.

== Historical significance ==
The massacre of December 10, 1959, played a direct role in the radicalization of the Namibian anti-colonial movement. In his autobiography, Sam Nujoma explicitly cites the sight os Anna Mungunda's body as one of the factors that led him to choose armed struggle. He writes " I was very moved to see her body. I knew her well, of course. She seemed to shine even in death. We knew, seeing the bodies of these innocent people, that we had to fond a way to fight these Boers. This is what inspired me and others to leave the country to prepare for a long armed struggle for liberation".

He then secretly left South West Africa on February 29, 1960. The OPO was transformed into SWAPO in April of the same year.

=== Contested Memory ===
The figure of Anna Mungunda is subject to divergent interpretations. The official version, promoted notably by Sam Nujoma and the publication of the SWAPO, presents her as a heroic activist in the anti-colonial resisantace. A counter-narrative, published by The Namibian in 2015, challenges this presentation, arguing that she was not a member of the organized protest movement and that her actions were merely circumstantial. Henning Melber, a historian specializing in Namibia, notes that this tension between official and popular memory is one of the characteristics of the construction of heroic figures in the post-colonial Namibian context.
