= Carl Peters =

German explorer and colonial administrator (1856–1918)

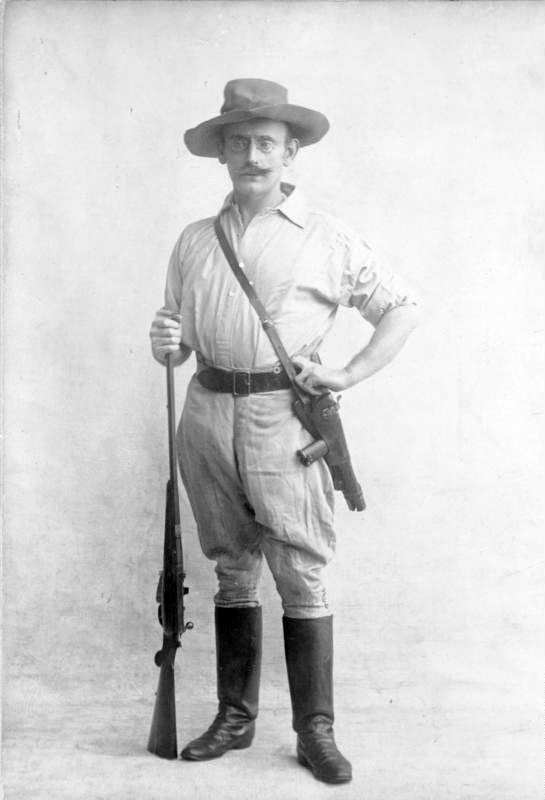
- Peters in c. 1895

1st Reichskommissar of German East Africa
- In office 27 May 1885 – 21 February 1891
- Deputy: Hermann Wissmann
- Preceded by: Position established
- Succeeded by: Julius von Soden

Personal details
- Born: 27 September 1856 Neuhaus, Kingdom of Hanover
- Died: 10 September 1918 (aged 61) Bad Harzburg, German Empire
- Education: University of Göttingen; University of Tübingen; Frederick William University

Carl Peters (27 September 1856 – 10 September 1918) was a German explorer and colonial administrator. He was a major promoter of the establishment of the German colony of East Africa (part of today’s Tanzania) and one of the founders of the German East Africa Company. He was a controversial figure in Germany for his views and his brutal treatment of native Africans, which ultimately led to his dismissal from government service in 1897.

== Early life ==
Peters was born on 27 September 1856 at Neuhaus an der Elbe in the Kingdom of Hanover, the son of a Lutheran clergyman. Peters studied history and philosophy at the universities of Göttingen and Tübingen, and at the Humboldt University of Berlin as a student of Heinrich von Treitschke. In 1879, he was awarded a gold medal by the Frederick William University for his dissertation concerning the 1177 Treaty of Venice and habilitated with a treatise concerning Arthur Schopenhauer.

== Career ==
=== German East Africa Company ===
After his studies, instead of becoming a teacher, Peters moved to London, where he stayed with his recently widowed maternal uncle, Carl Engel, on Addison Road. Engel was a distinguished composer and musical essayist, the brother-in-law of the ophthalmologist Sir William Bowman, and lived the life of a gentleman. During his time in London, Peters was offered the opportunity of becoming a British subject, which he rejected due to his German nationalist sympathies. Having studied the principles of European colonialism during his foreign sojourn, when Peters returned to Berlin he initiated the Society for German Colonization (Gesellschaft für Deutsche Kolonisation), a pressure group for the acquisition of colonies by Germany.

In the autumn of 1884, he proceeded with two companions to East Africa, and concluded in the name of his society treaties with the chiefs of Usagara and neighbouring areas. The treaties were written in German and had little legal value. Even Karl Jühlke, who was a member of Peters' expedition, conceded that "it is true that the natives were probably not clear as to the significance of the treaties." Returning to Europe early in 1885, Peters formed the German East Africa Company, as successor to the Society for German Colonization.

The German government of Chancellor Otto von Bismarck, fearing the effect on relations with the British, was originally opposed to these plans, and had refused any funding when Peters began. Bismarck refused a second time when Peters returned to Germany during the last days of the Berlin Conference of 1884, demanding an imperial charter. Peters threatened the Chancellor successfully by threatening to sell his acquisitions to King Leopold II of Belgium who was eager to expand his territory of Congo. As Bismarck's National Liberal Party allies in the Reichstag parliament were pro-colonial anyway, he finally agreed and the charter was granted on 27 February 1885. This constituted the necessary beginning for further expansion on the East African mainland in the years ensuing.

Peters had no training or experience in running a business, and the German East Africa Company was soon in financial difficulties. With government intervention it was reorganised and refinanced in March 1887 and Peters had to renounce his control. He was appointed as the company's director in Zanzibar, where he served during 1887-88. However he failed to negotiate a treaty with Barghash bin Said, sultan of Zanzibar, for the leasing of the coastal zone, and he was recalled to Germany early in 1888. Later that year the German East Africa Company reached an agreement with Barghash's successor, Sultan Khalifah bin Said of Zanzibar, who leased his coastal dominions in what was to be Tanganyika to the German East Africa Company.

=== Emin Pasha Relief Expedition ===
In the same year Peters began an expedition from the east coast of Africa, avowedly for the relief of Emin Pasha, actually to extend the area of German influence in Uganda and Equatoria. This expedition was not sanctioned by the German government and was regarded by local British authorities as a filibuster (in the 19th century sense of the word). Peters and his expedition "lived off the land," seizing foodstuffs from the local population. Several years later the Danish explorer, Peder Scavenius, was travelling in the Tana valley, and reported that

"On every side I came on traces of war. In the neighborhood of Obangi I found even villages that had been destroyed by fire, and everywhere skeletons of men, women, and children, those of women and children being especially numerous… It was almost impossible for me to procure the necessary rice for my people, for as soon as we approached the whole populace fled panic-stricken. The natives were terrified at my white face, for the last white man they had seen was Dr. Peters."

Reaching Uganda in early 1890, Peters learnt that Emin Pasha had already been located by the American explorer, Henry Morton Stanley. Peters concluded a treaty with Kabaka Mwanga II of Buganda in favour of Germany. He had to leave Uganda hastily on the approach of an expedition commanded by Frederick Lugard, the representative of the Imperial British East Africa Company. On reaching Zanzibar he learned that his efforts were useless, as on 1 July 1890 the Heligoland–Zanzibar Treaty between Germany and the UK had been signed, whereby Uganda was left as an area of British influence and Peters's agreement with Mwanga became null and void. Meanwhile, the power of his company had ended when the coastal population rebelled in the Abushiri Revolt against the implementation of the lease agreement between the Sultan and the Germans. The German government had to intervene by sending troops commanded by Hermann Wissmann, who ended the insurrection. The German government took over the administration of the territory as a crown colony.

Nevertheless, on his return to Germany Peters was received with great honours, and in 1891 published an account of his expedition entitled Die deutsche Emin Pasha Expedition, which was translated into English. He also endorsed the foundation of the Alldeutscher Verband in protest against the Heligoland–Zanzibar Treaty.

=== Reichskommissar ===
On 18 March 1891, he went out again to East Africa as "Reichskommissar for the Kilimanjaro Region" in Moshi, however subordinate to governor Freiherr von Soden. Peters soon moved the German station from Moshi to Marangu, and he undertook a punitive mission against the Rombo in September 1891. In October 1891 Mabruk, one of Peters' African servants, broke into the station house at Marangu one night and possibly had sexual relations with one of the African women who were kept as sex-slaves by the Germans. Peters was furious and had the man hanged as punishment. In January 1892 one of those African women, Jagodjo, was also hanged, because Peters suspected her of having been a spy. It was Anglican missionaries who brought this matter to the attention of Governor von Soden, who initiated an inconclusive investigation.

Soden recalled Peters to the coast and gave him the task of working on a commission with the British to delineate the boundary between German East Africa and the British colony which would later become Kenya. Shortly after Peters' departure from Kilimanjaro the German forces there suffered a devastating defeat at the hands of chief Meli of Moshi. There were those who believed that Peters' political ineptitude had sown the seeds of this disaster, and reports criticising Peters began to appear in the German press in June 1892.

Peters was recalled to Berlin and employed in the Colonial Section of the Foreign Office from 1893 to 1895, while official accusations were brought against him of excesses in regard to his treatment of the African population. In a session of the Reichstag on 13 March 1896 August Bebel, chairman of the Social Democratic Party, finally made the killings public, citing from an alleged letter written by Peters to Bishop Alfred Tucker. Peters correctly denied the authenticity of the letter but had to admit the executions. After three investigations, in 1897, he was dishonourably deprived of his commission for misuse of official power, losing all his pension benefits.

== Later life and death ==
Peters evaded final sentencing and further criminal prosecution by relocating to London, where he occupied himself with schemes for exploiting parts of Rhodesia and Portuguese East Africa. In the interests of a gold mining company he formed, Peters explored the Fura district and Macombes country on the Zambezi river, where in 1899 he discovered ruins of cities and deserted gold mines of the medieval Kingdom of Mutapa, which he identified as the legendary ancient lands of Ophir. He returned in 1901 and gave an account of his explorations in Im Goldland des Altertums (The Eldorado of the Ancients) (1902). In 1905, he again visited the region between the Zambezi and Save rivers.

In 1907–1908 Peters, who had again taken up residence in Germany, brought actions for libel against a Munich journal and the Kölnische Zeitung, seeking to clear his character in regard to his administration in East Africa. These actions wrought no change in public opinion in Germany and Peters remained on the retired list.

In 1914, Peters was able to return to Germany, after Emperor Wilhelm II by personal decree had bestowed upon him the right to use the title of an Imperial Commissioner again and had given him a pension from his personal budget, while the sentence by the disciplinary court remained in effect.

Peters published an autobiography in February 1918 and died on 10 September.

== Legacy ==
Besides the books already mentioned and some smaller treatises, Peters published a philosophical work entitled Willenswelt und Weltwille (1883), and a disquisition on early gold production entitled Das goldene Ophir Salomo's (1895), translated into English in 1899.

A proponent of Social Darwinism and the Völkisch philosophy, his attitude towards the indigenous population made him one of the most controversial colonizers even during his lifetime. Critics among Social Democrats, Catholic, and Free-minded politicians considered Peters a national shame. The Austrian Africanist Oscar Baumann referred to him as "half crazy". One of his nicknames in the German critical press was Hänge-Peters ("Hangman-Peters"). He was known by natives as "mkono wa damu", meaning "the man with blood on his hands".

However, Peters was feted as a national hero among colonial-minded people. Peters was celebrated as a national hero in Nazi Germany, and was officially rehabilitated by personal decree of Adolf Hitler in 1936. During World War II, the Kriegsmarine fleet tender Carl Peters was named after him. He was also the subject of a 1941 propaganda film, Carl Peters, by Herbert Selpin, starring Hans Albers as Peters.

A number of towns in Germany had streets named after Peters, but many were later renamed following debate concerning his legacy. For example, Petersallee in the Afrikanisches Viertel in Berlin was originally named after Carl Peters, but was rededicated in 1986 to Hans Peters, a member of the anti-Nazi resistance. After decades of demands for renaming the Petersallee in Berlin, spearheaded by African and BPoC activists, the street was renamed on 23 August 2024. One part became Maji-Maji-Allee, in remembrance of the Maji-Maji War, the other was baptised Anna-Mungunda-Street, in honour of Anna Mungunda, a Namibian hero of the Anti-Apartheid Struggle.
