= Volkspark Rehberge =

Park in Berlin

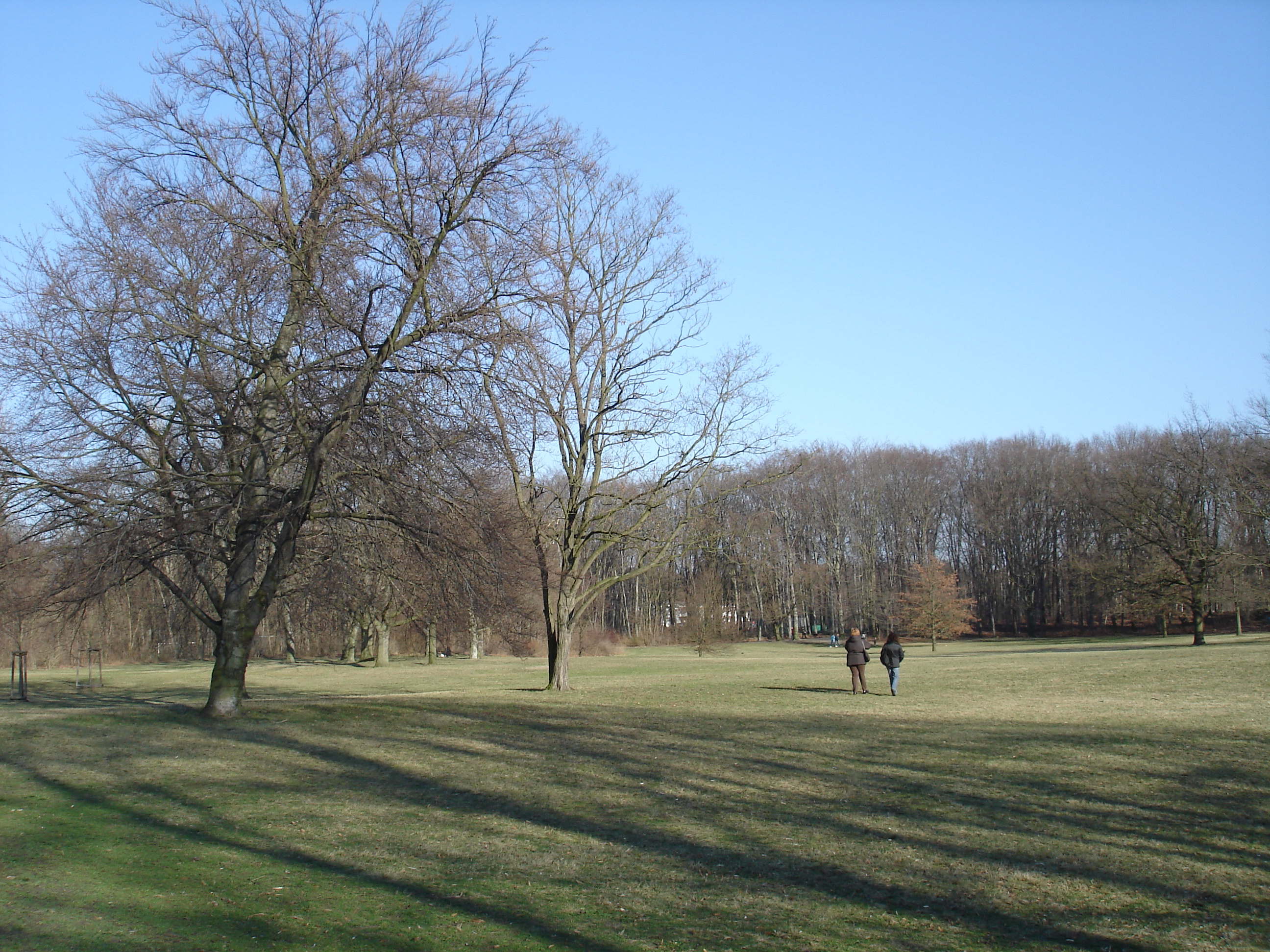

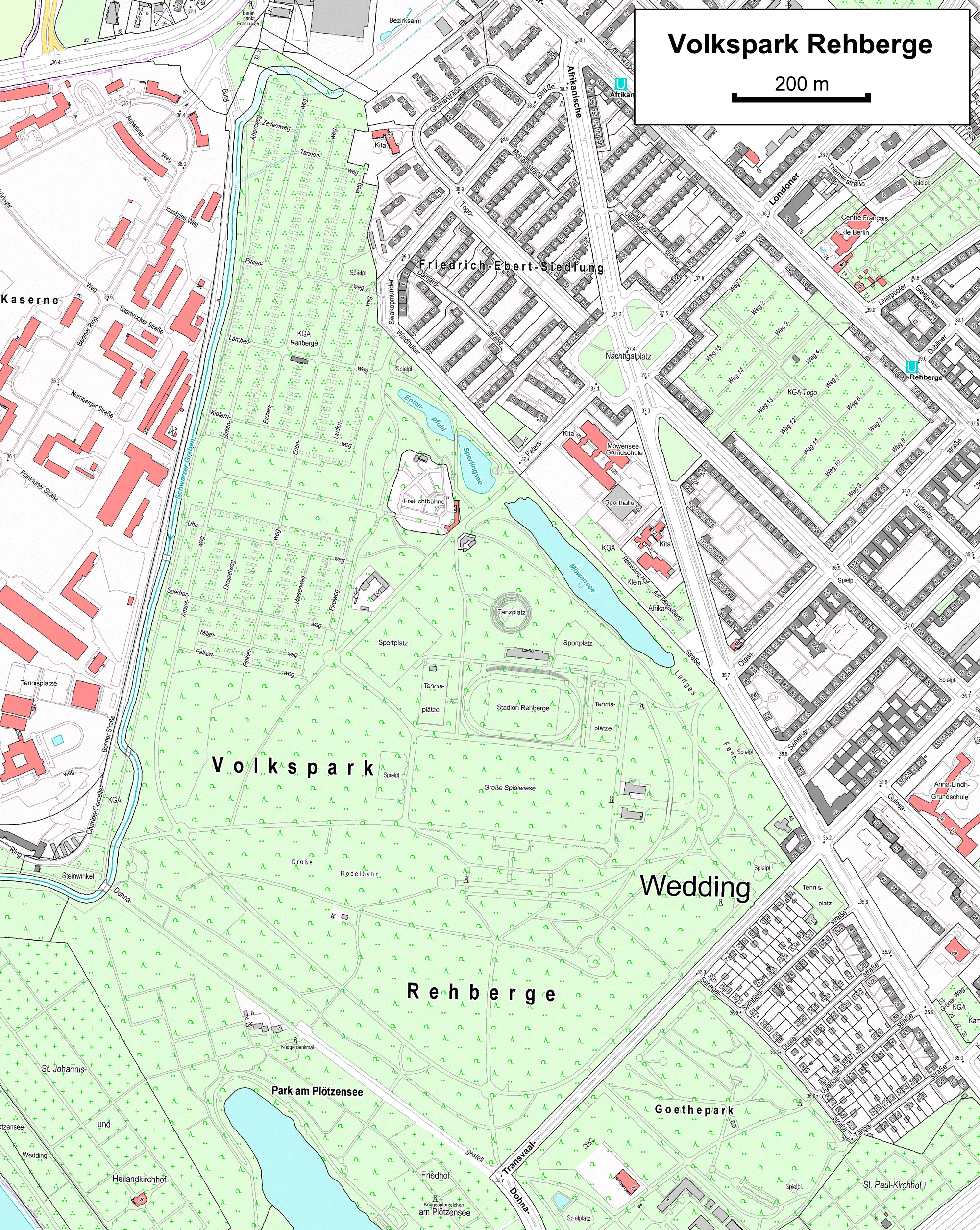
- Type: Urban park
- Location: Wedding, Berlin
- Coordinates: 52°33′3″N 13°19′51″E
- Area: 78 hectares (190 acres)
- Created: 1922
- Status: Open year-round

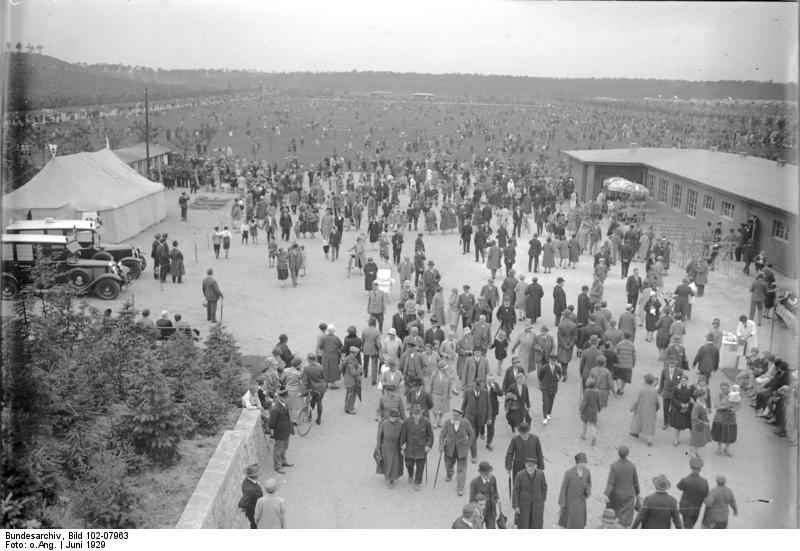
The meadow at Volkspark Rehberge on opening day, June 1929

Volkspark Rehberge is a public park in Wedding, a locality of Mitte, Berlin, Germany. The park was created and constructed from 1922–1929. The park covers approximately 78 hectares (190 acres). Together with Goethepark, which is located immediately south-east of the park, the total park landscape is approximately 115 hectares (280 acres). To the south-west is the Plötzensee and its surrounding park. The park borders on the Afrikanisches Viertel. In addition to large meadows and pedestrian and bicycle paths, the park also offers animal enclosures, playgrounds, a toboggan run with a 20 metres (66 ft) height difference, sports fields, concessions, and an open-air theatre.

Since 1953, portions of the parks have been designated as a protected nature area. The landscape of the park dates back to the Last Glacial Maximum (ca. 20,000 years ago), containing inland dunes and a post-glacial iceway, which is now a chain of three long, narrow lakes. The park also contains several larger sporting areas. Stadion Rehberge is the home stadium for BSC Rehberge 1945, a Berlin sports club. The park also lends its name to the nearby subway station Rehberge.
