= Carl Engel (musicologist) =

British musicologist

Carl Engel (6 July 1818 – 17 November 1882) was a German writer of music, and a collector of musical instruments.

== Biography ==
Engel was born in Thiedenwiese, near Hanover, and studied the pianoforte under Hummel. He emigrated to Manchester around 1844–45, and in 1850 settled in London, where he attained success as a teacher of music and writer on musical subjects. He owned a large collection of rare musical instruments, many of which were given after his death to the South Kensington Museum, with which he had been connected for many years.

One of his nephews (a son of his sister Elisabeth) was Carl Peters (1856–1918). Peters came to London in 1881 and lived in his uncles' house. Engel offered Peters to procure for him a British citizenship, which would have come with many advantages, but Peters refused for nationalistic reasons. Engel later committed suicide and bequeathed his fortune to Peters.

== Works ==
His books treat of the music of different nations at different periods. Among them may be mentioned:

- The Music of the Most Ancient Nations, particularly of the Assyrians, Egyptians and Hebrews (Murray, 1864) 1909 exact facsimile reprint of the 1864 edition. W. Reeves. 1909.
- An Introduction to the Study of National Music (Longmans, 1866)
- Researches into the Early History of the Violin Family (1883)

An extensive account of the musical instruments of the world was still unpublished in 1888.
