= Goethepark =

Public park in Wedding, Mitte, Berlin, Germany

Goethe park
- Goethepark
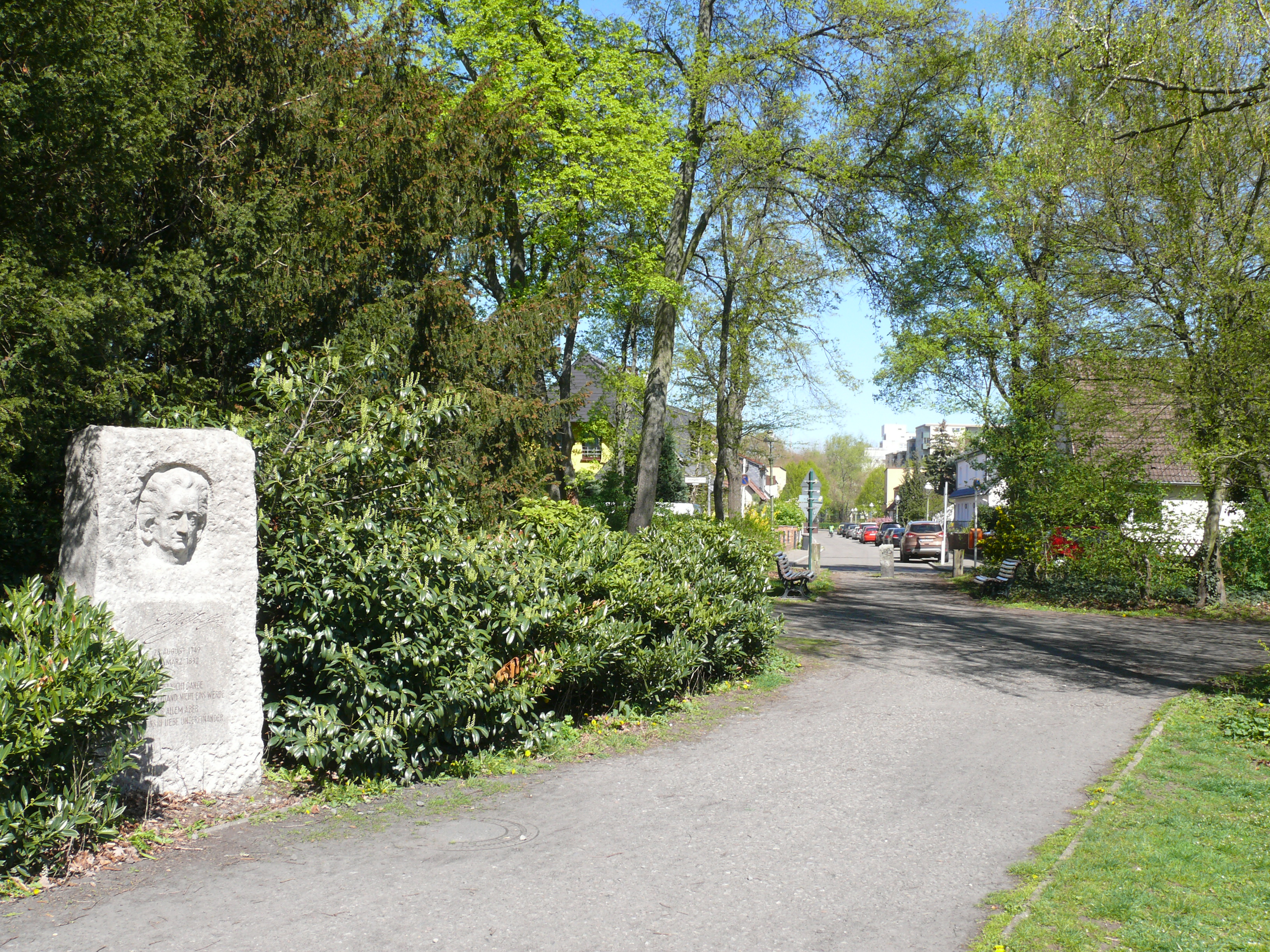
- Memorial to Johann Wolfgang von Goethe

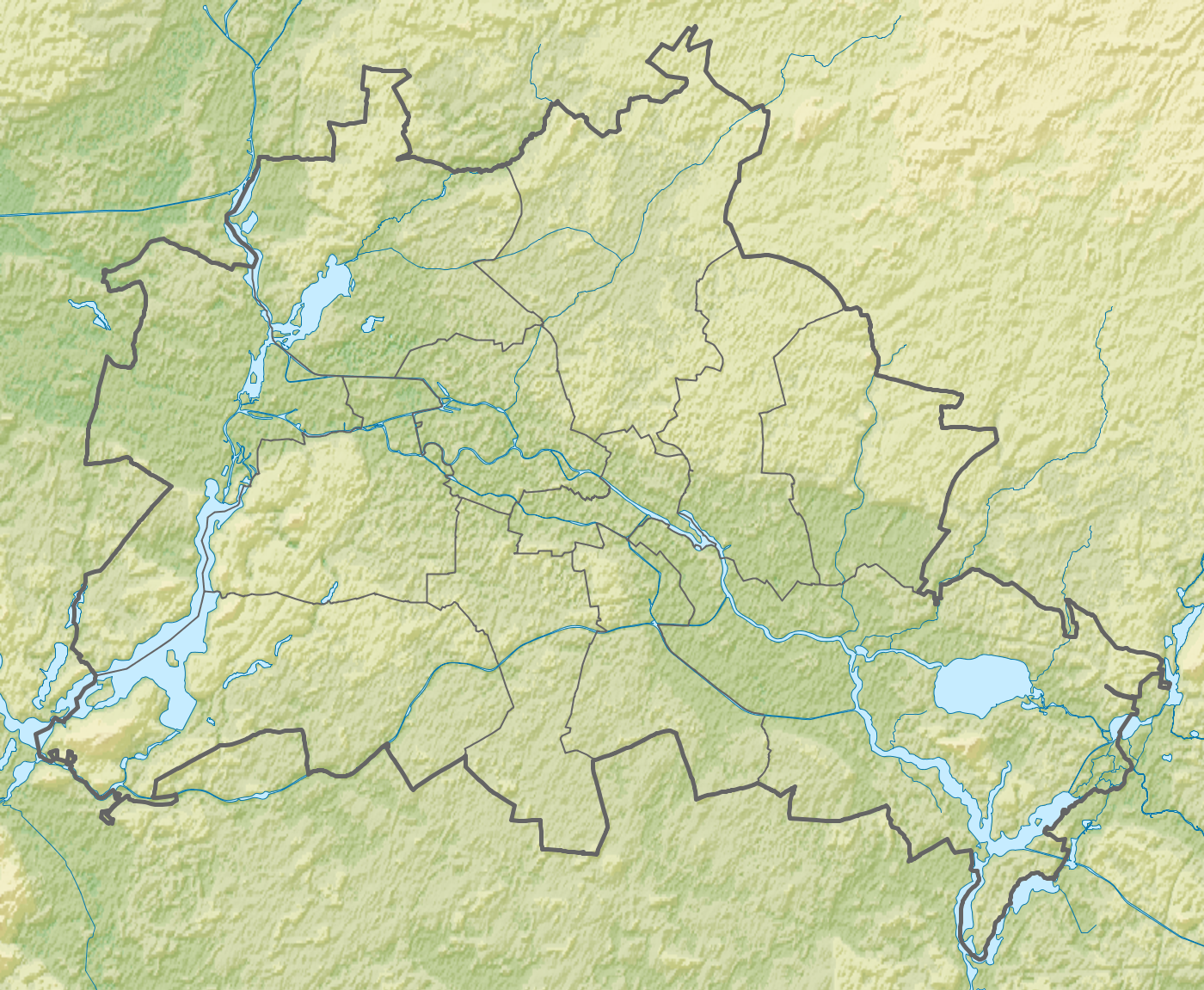
- Location within Berlin
- Type: Urban park
- Location: Wedding, Berlin
- Coordinates: 52°32′49.3″N 13°20′13.5″E
- Area: 37 hectares (91 acres)
- Created: 1922-1924
- Status: Open year-round

Goethepark is a public park in Wedding, a locality of Mitte, Berlin, Germany. The park was created and constructed from 1922–1924. The park covers approximately 37 hectares (91 acres). Together with Volkspark Rehberge, which is located adjacent to the north-west edge of the park, the total park landscape is approximately 115 hectares (280 acres). To the west is the Plötzensee and its surrounding park.
