= Wedding (Berlin) =

- Quarter of Berlin
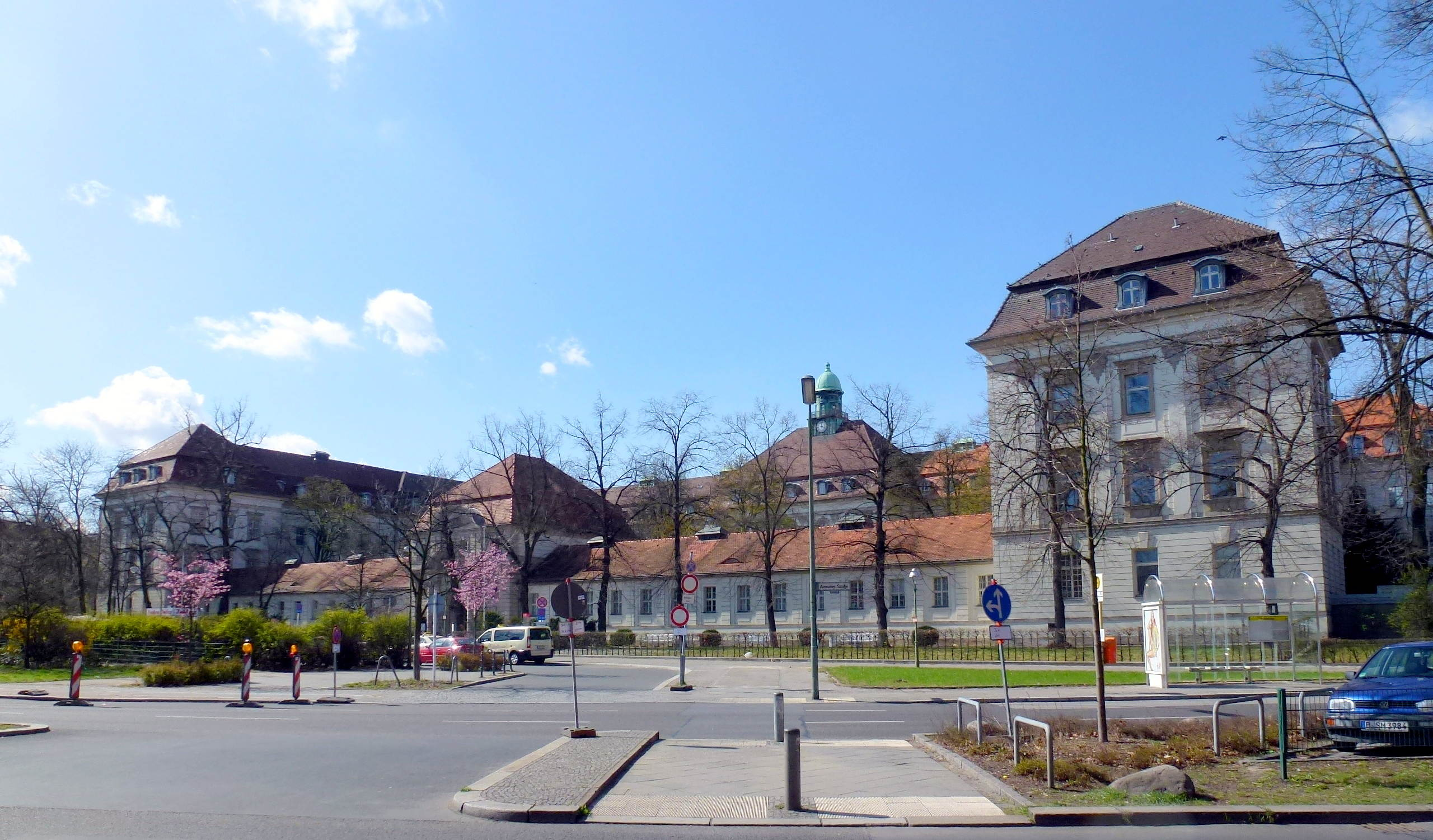
- Augustenburger Platz with Campus Virchow Klinikum

- Coat of arms

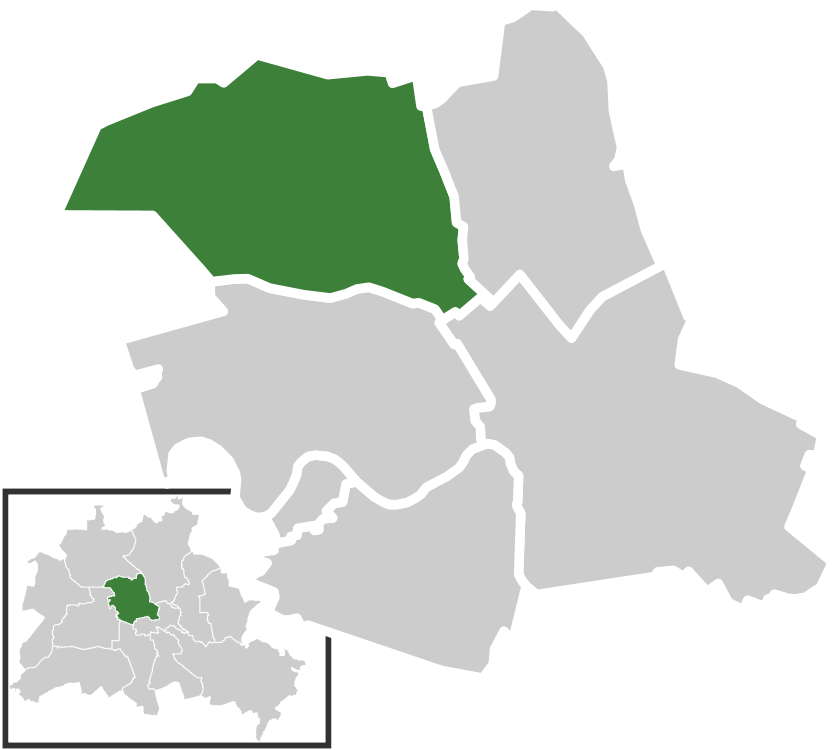
- Location of Wedding in Mitte district and Berlin
- Interactive map of Wedding
- Location within Germany Location within Berlin
- Coordinates: 52°33′00″N 13°20′33″E
- Country: Germany
- State: Berlin
- City: Berlin
- Borough: Mitte
- Founded: 1861

Area
  - Total: 9.23 km^{2} (3.56 sq mi)
- Elevation: 52 m (171 ft)

Population (2024-12-31)
  - Total: 86,796
  - Density: 9,400/km^{2} (24,400/sq mi)
- Time zone: UTC+01:00 (CET)
  - Summer (DST): UTC+02:00 (CEST)
- Postal codes: 13347, 13349, 13351, 13353, 13355, 13357, 13359, 13407
- Vehicle registration: B

Wedding (German: der Wedding, pronounced [ˈvɛdɪŋ]) is a locality in the borough of Mitte, Berlin, Germany. It was a separate borough in the north-western inner city until it was fused with Tiergarten and Mitte in Berlin's 2001 administrative reform. At the same time the eastern half of the former borough of Wedding—on the other side of Reinickendorfer Straße—was separated as the new locality of Gesundbrunnen.

== History ==
In the 12th century, the manor of the nobleman Rudolf de Weddinge was located on the small Panke River in the immediate vicinity of today's Nettelbeckplatz. The farmstead, which burned down more than once, remained abandoned in the forest until the 18th century. In the mid-18th century, while Gesundbrunnen was being built up as a health resort and spa town, gambling and prostitution moved into Wedding, transforming it into a pleasure district. In 1864, Ernst Christian Friedrich Schering established the Schering pharmaceutical company on Müllerstraße; the company has been a part of Bayer since 2006. A large hospital at the western rim of the locality was built between 1898 and 1906 on the initiative of Rudolf Virchow. The Rotaprint plant was initiated in Wedding in 1904 and became one of the largest employers locally with about 1,000 staff at its height.

Coat of arms of the former borough of Wedding

The constant migration of country-dwellers into the city at the end of the 19th century converted Wedding into a working-class district. The labourers lived in cramped tenement blocks, many in the Wilhelmine Ring. After World War I, Wedding was known as "Red Wedding" as it was renowned for its militant, largely Communist working class; it was the scene of violent clashes between paramilitary groups such as the KPD's Roter Frontkämpferbund and the Nazi Party's Sturmabteilung in the late 1920s, including the Blutmai riots of 1929 in which the Social Democratic–controlled Berlin Police killed 33 Communists.

After World War II, Wedding and Reinickendorf together made up the French sector of Berlin. The buildings on the north side of Wedding's Bernauer Straße and the street, including sidewalks, were in the French sector, while the buildings along the southern side were in Soviet territory. When the Berlin Wall was being built in August 1961, many who lived in these buildings frantically jumped from their windows before the buildings could be evacuated and their windows bricked up.

Wedding was also the western terminus of one of the first refugee tunnels dug underneath the Berlin Wall. It extended from the basement of an abandoned factory on Schönholzer Straße in the Soviet sector underneath Bernauer Straße to another building in the west. Though marvelously well constructed and kept secret, the tunnel was plagued by water from leaking pipes, and had to be shut down after only a few days of operation.

A section of the wall has been reconstructed near the spot on Bernauer Straße (since 2001 part of the locality of Gesundbrunnen) where the tunnel ended. Two sections of wall run parallel to one another down the street with a "death strip" in the middle. A nearby museum documents the history of the wall.

== Wedding today ==
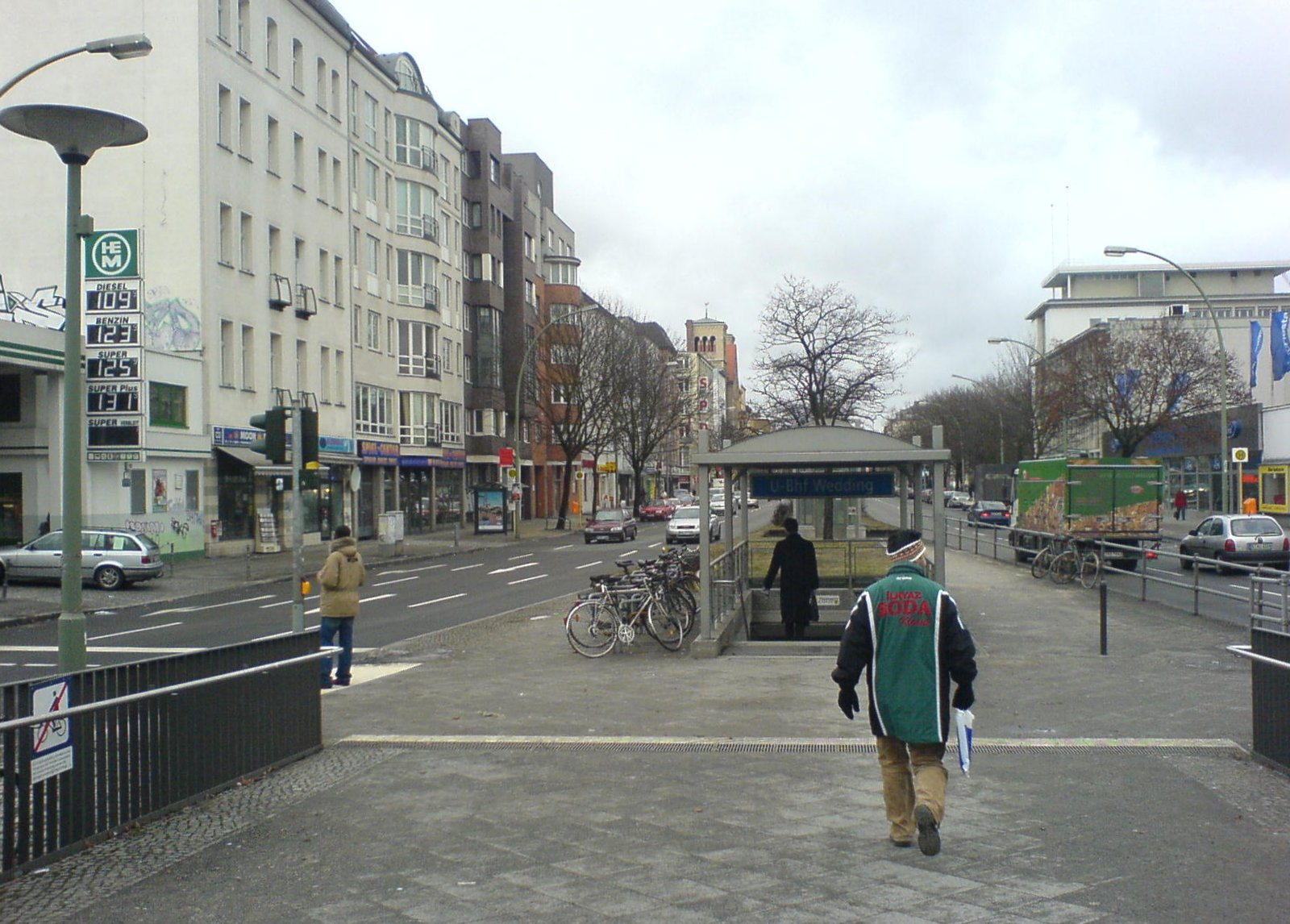
Berlin-Wedding station on Müllerstraße

Today, Wedding is one of the poorest areas of Berlin, with a high unemployment rate (almost 26%). Almost 17% of the population live on social welfare; 27% live below the poverty line. Foreigners make up 30% of the population. Low rental costs accompany the poverty in Wedding. Therefore, like many inexpensive areas in large cities, it is home to artists' community. Many galleries have been founded by artists to provide a space for themselves and their peers to showcase their works.

Wedding has so far not experienced the boom and development of the 1990s in post-reunification Berlin. Unlike many other 19th-century working class districts like Prenzlauer Berg, the original character of Wedding has been mostly preserved. It is still said though to be a place to find the Schnauze mit Herz (big mouth and big heart) of the Berlin working class.

The statistics used above are long out of date and need updating. By 2024, the district has also seen quite a long period of moving towards being a desirable part of Berlin to live, especially by the young creative class and that mixes with some of its deprived areas.

== Demographics ==
Along with Kreuzberg, Wedding is one of the most ethnically diverse localities of Berlin. The multicultural atmosphere is visible in the bilingual shop signs (predominantly German and Turkish or German and Arabic).

In recent years Wedding has seen a significant influx of Africans, many of whom have settled in the Afrikanisches Viertel, or African Quarter. Wedding is also home to an East Asian community, mostly from China, which is reflected in many Asian and African stores and restaurants. As of 2011, the ethnic make-up of Wedding was 52% of German origin, 18% Turks, 6% Sub-Saharan African, 6% Arabs, 6% Polish, 5% former Yugoslavia, and 4.5% Asian.

== Cityscape ==
Many buildings are relics of European post-war Modernism. The Schillerpark estate in northern Wedding is part of the Modernist Housing Estates World Heritage Site. Beside monolithic housing blocks, several old buildings survived the war and urban renewal and still have coal-fired heating. The church of St. Joseph from 1909 has served as interim cathedral of Berlin from 2018.

A green oasis marks the west borders of the "old red" district, with Volkspark Rehberge, Goethepark and the idyllic Plötzensee, a lake in the southwest. It is a popular summer hang-out offering sandy beaches and long lawns. A section of the beach is reserved for Freikörperkultur, a German nudist movement.

Near Scharnweberstraße 158/159 is Germany's last inner-city dune dating back to the last Ice Age.

== Notable people ==
- Jérôme Boateng (born 1988), football player and 2014 FIFA World Cup winner
- Kevin-Prince Boateng, German footballer for the Ghana national football team and Schalke 04, grew up in the area.
- Hans Coppi (1916–1942), German resistance fighter
- Thomas Dörflein (1963–2008), zookeeper, best known for raising Knut the polar bear
- Martin Held (1908–1992), German actor
- Otto and Elise Hampel, a working-class couple who created a simple method of protest while living in Wedding, Berlin during the early years of World War II. They were eventually caught, tried, and executed.
- Martina Hill (born 1974), German actress
- Niko Kovač (born 1971), Croatian football player
- Luise Kraushaar (1905–1989), political activist, Resistance campaigner against Nazism.
- Marie Kunert (1871–1957), German socialist politician and educator
- Hardy Krüger (1928–2022), German actor
- Erich Mielke, German longtime head of the East German Secret Police
- Leni Riefenstahl (1902–2003), German film director, actress and photographer
- Silvia Rodgers, writer and political activist

== Photo gallery ==
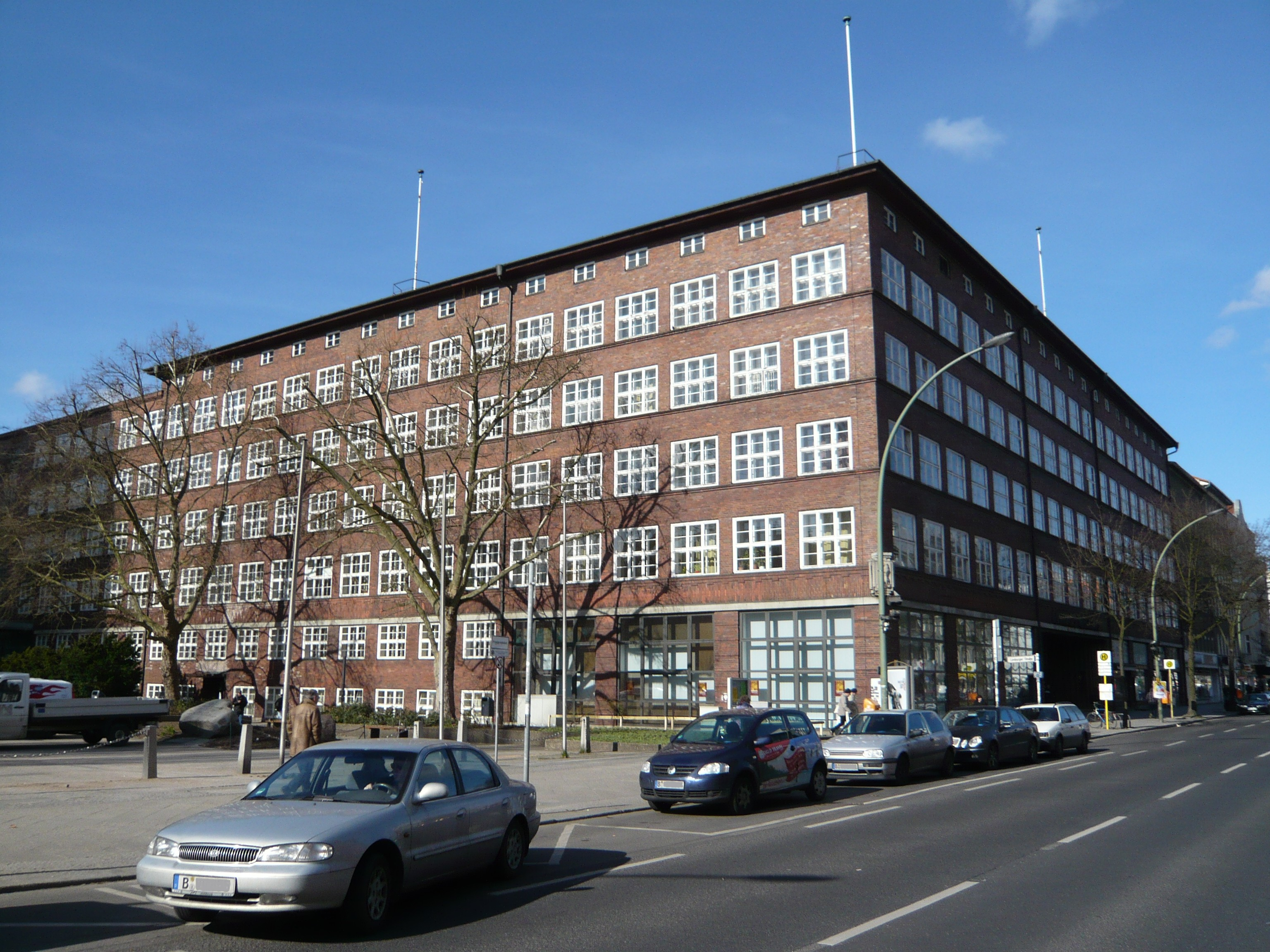
Wedding City Hall

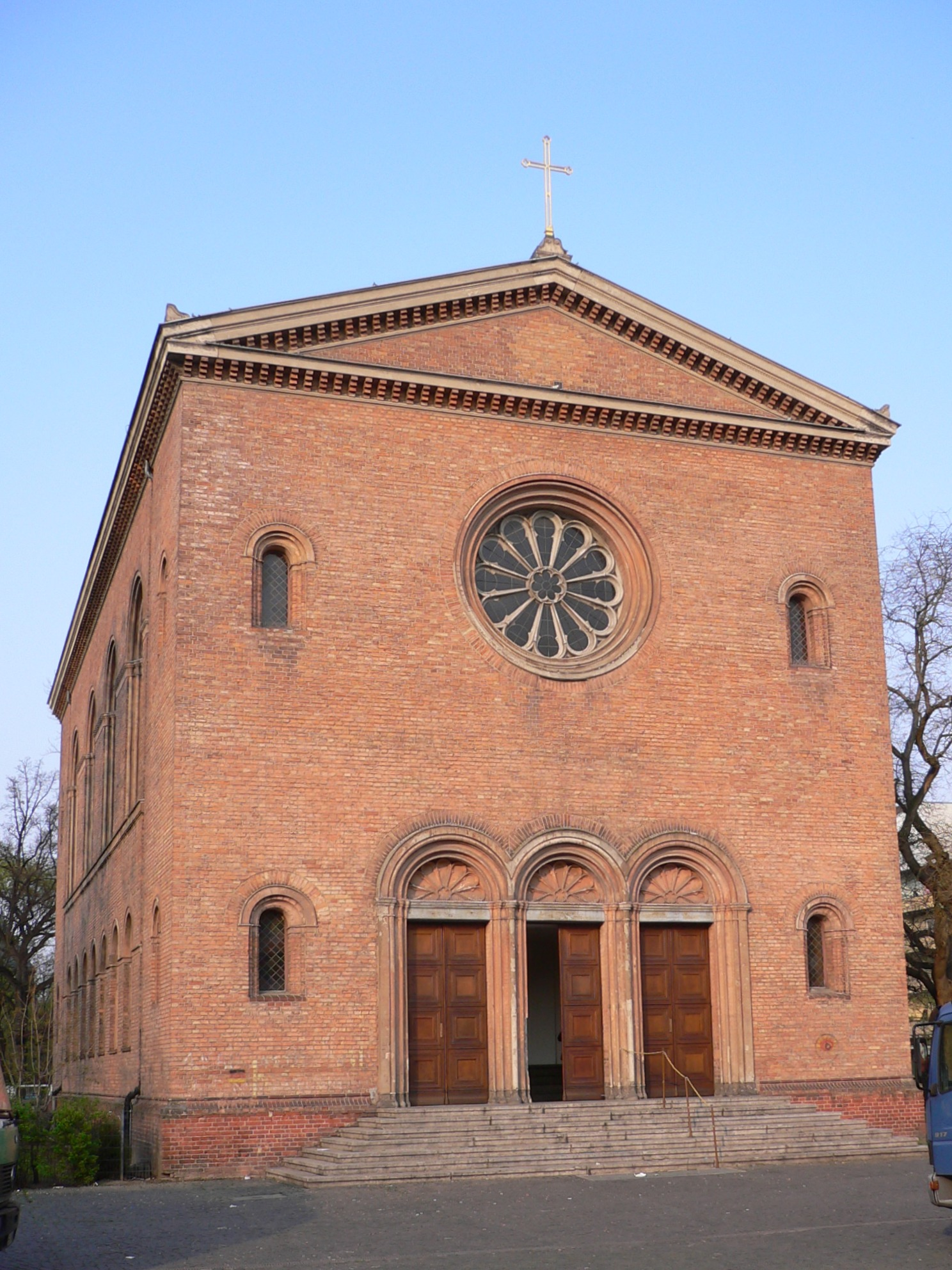
Protestant old Nazareth Church (by Schinkel) on Leopoldplatz
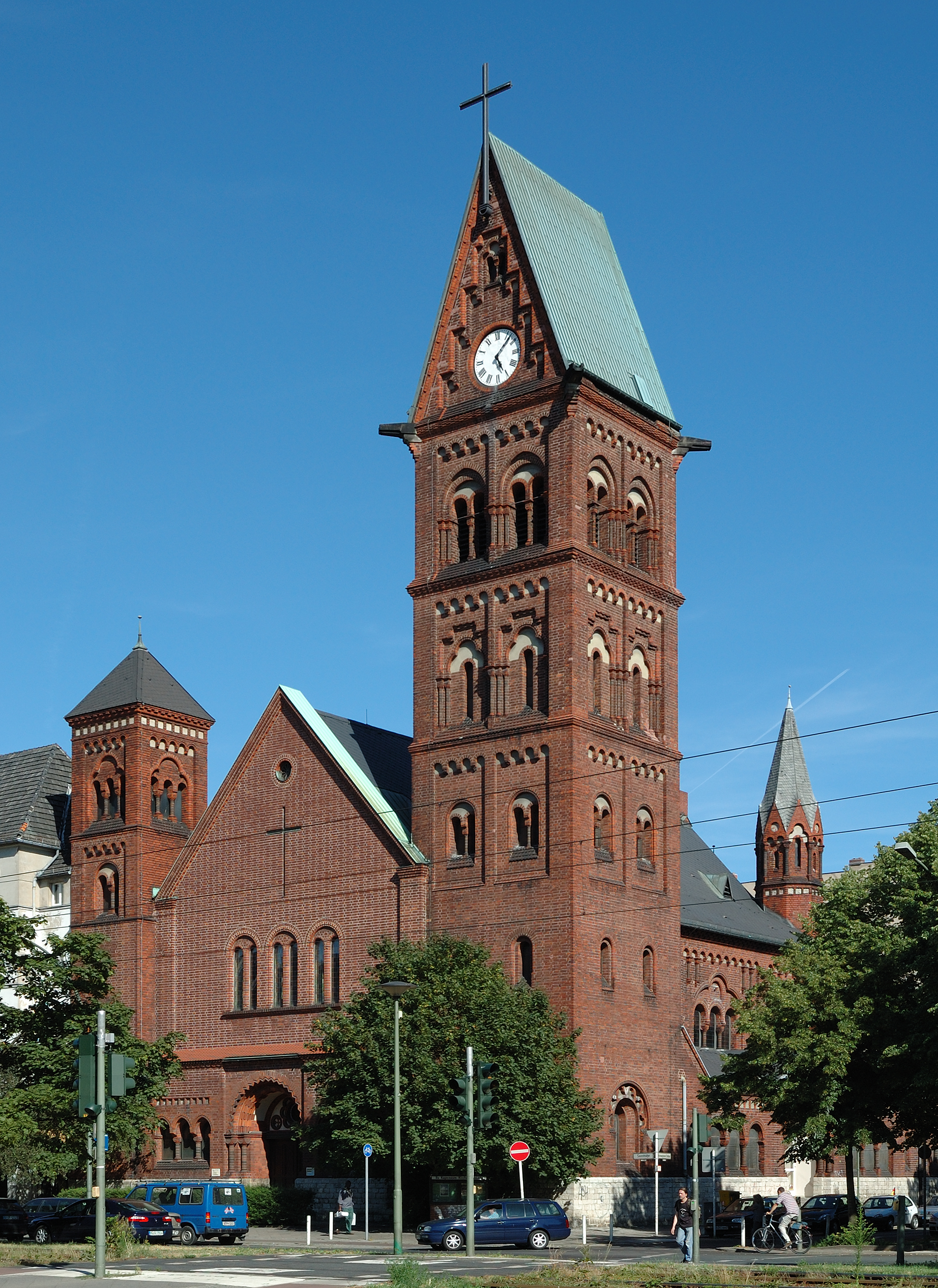
Protestant Capernaum Church on Seestraße

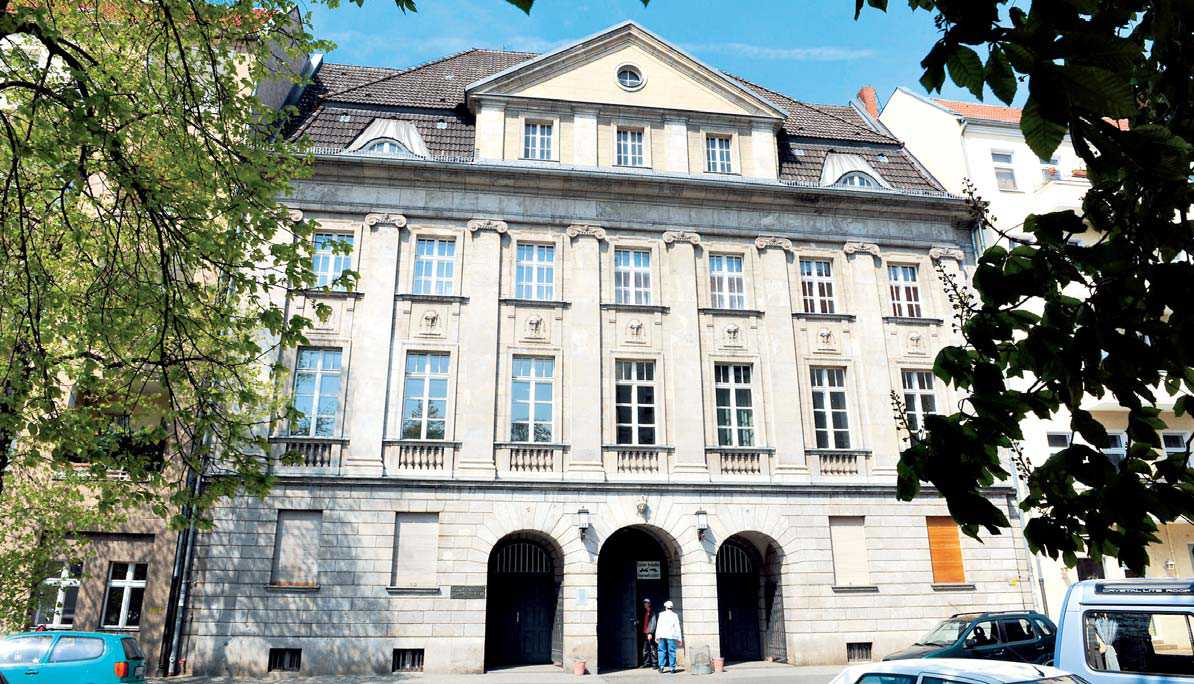
Lessing-Gymnasium high school
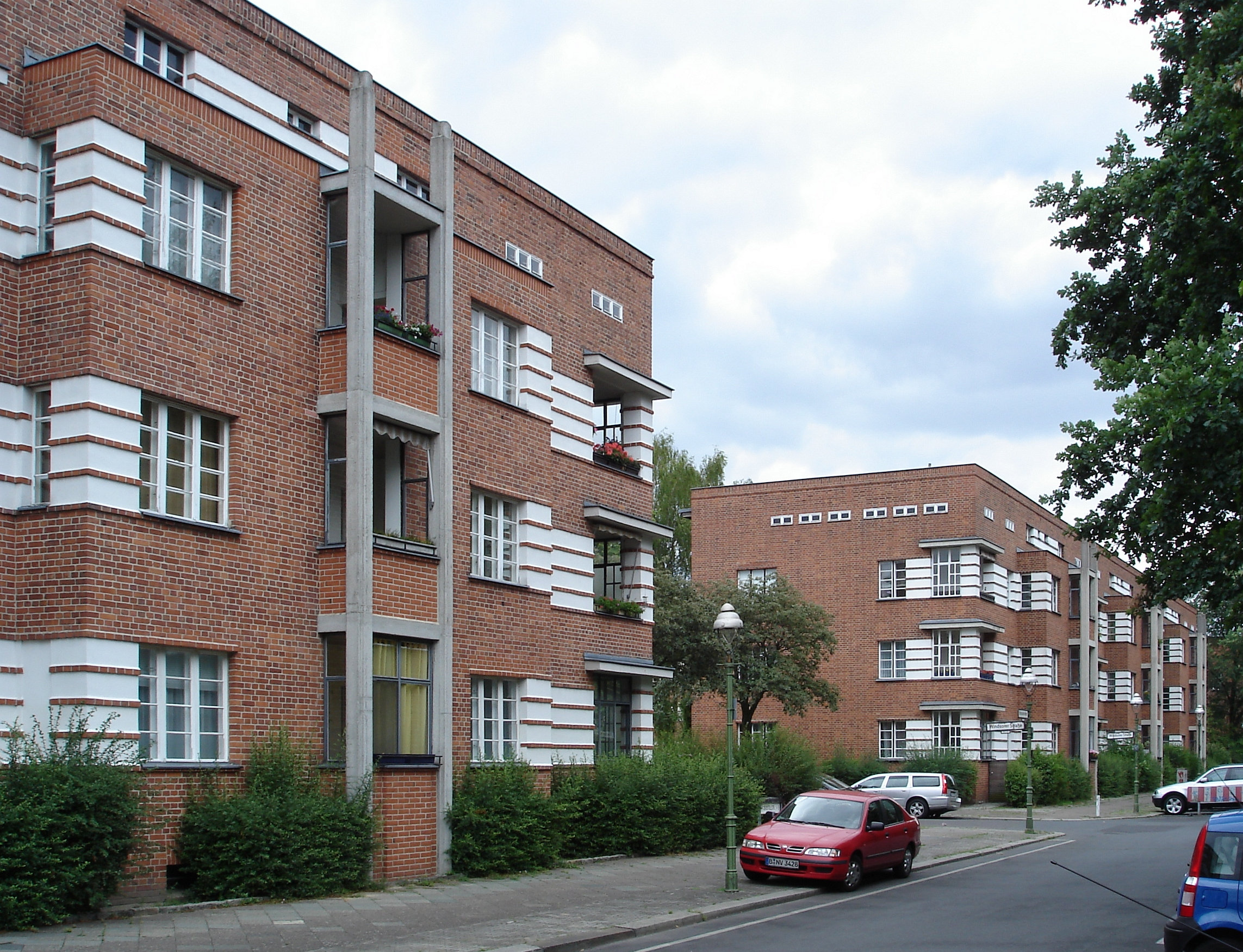
Schillerpark housing estate (by Bruno Taut) on Bristolstraße

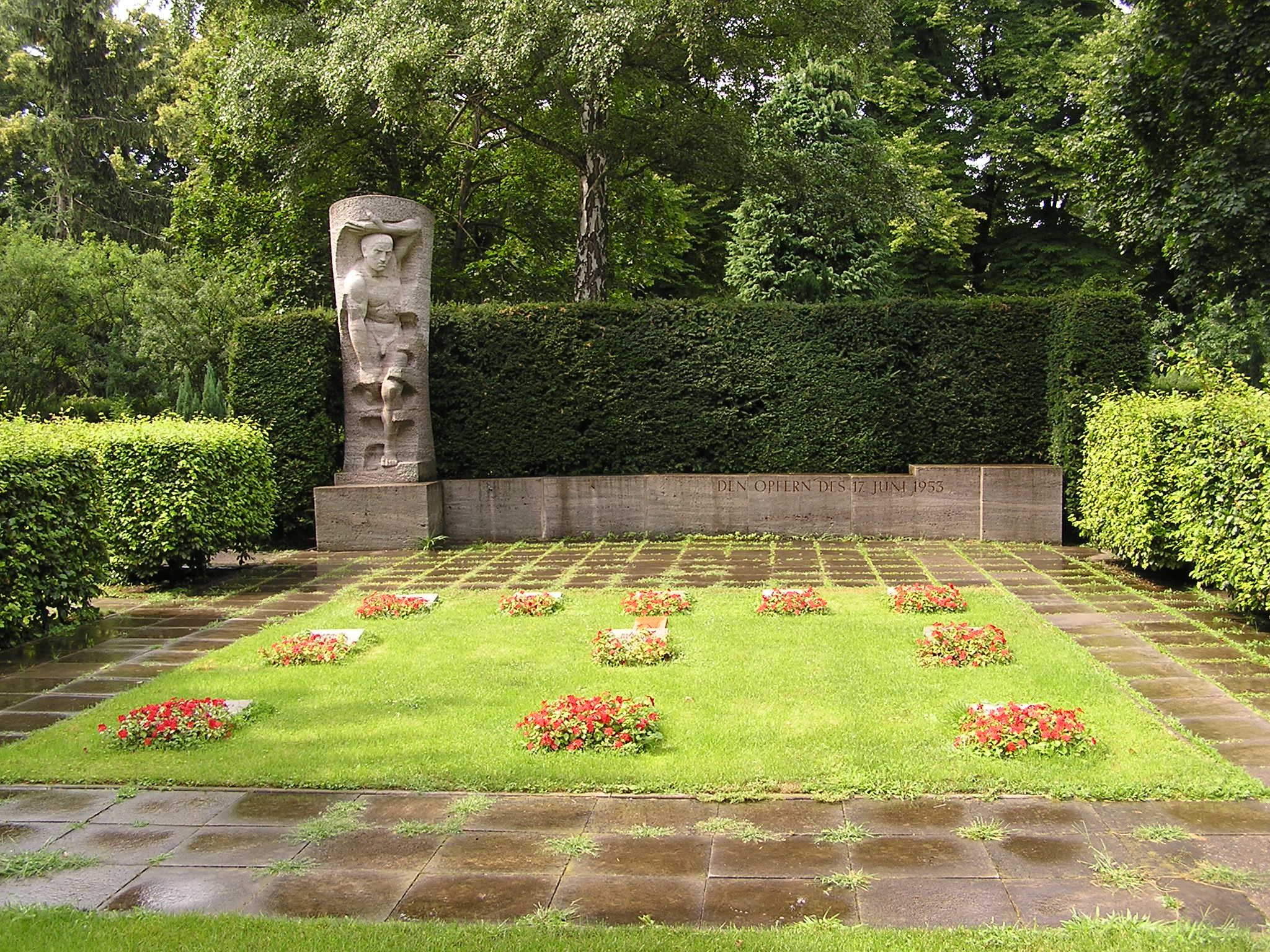
Cemetery and Memorial for the Victims of the Uprising of 1953 in East Germany
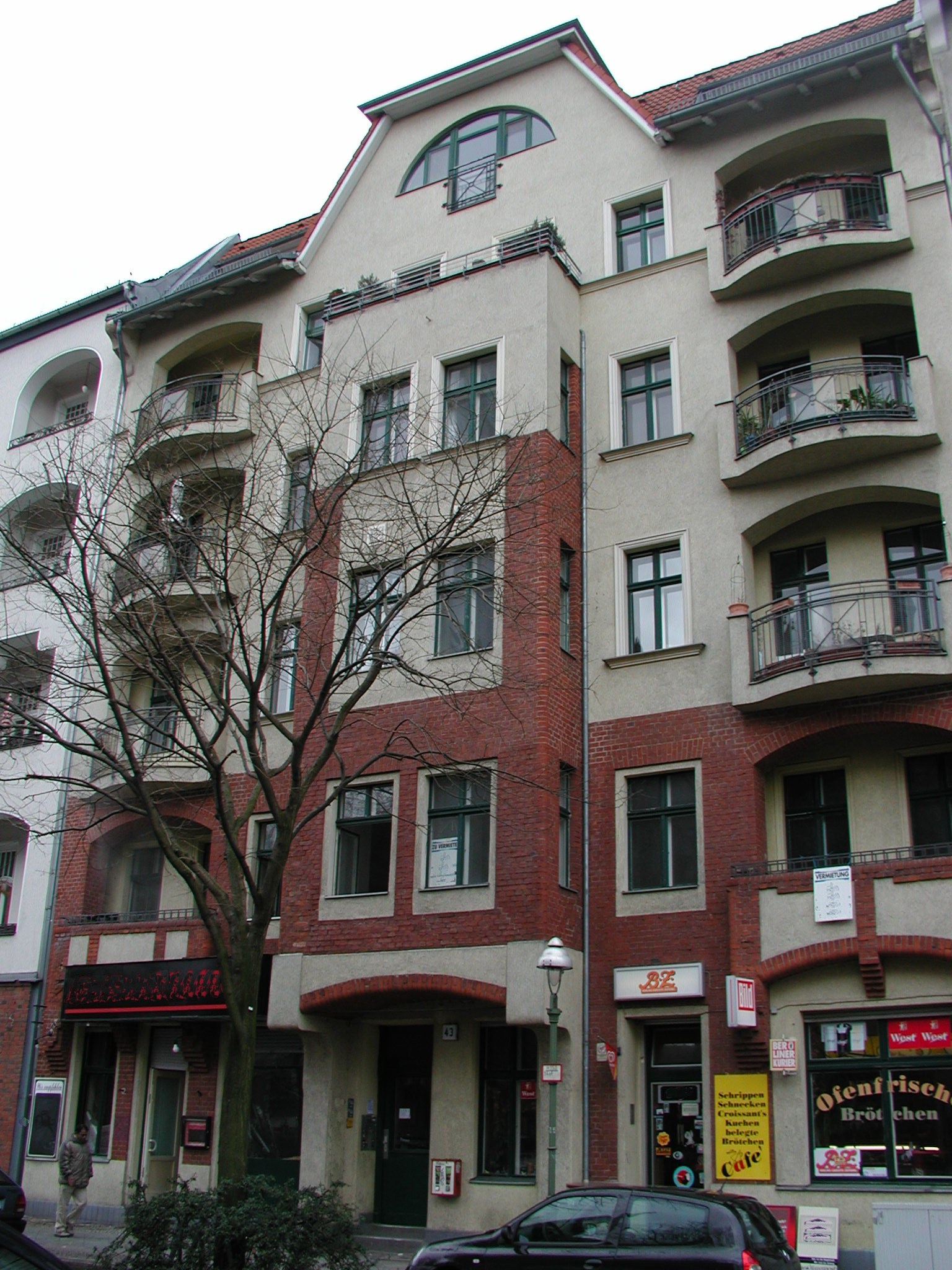
Typical houses in Wedding at Leopoldplatz

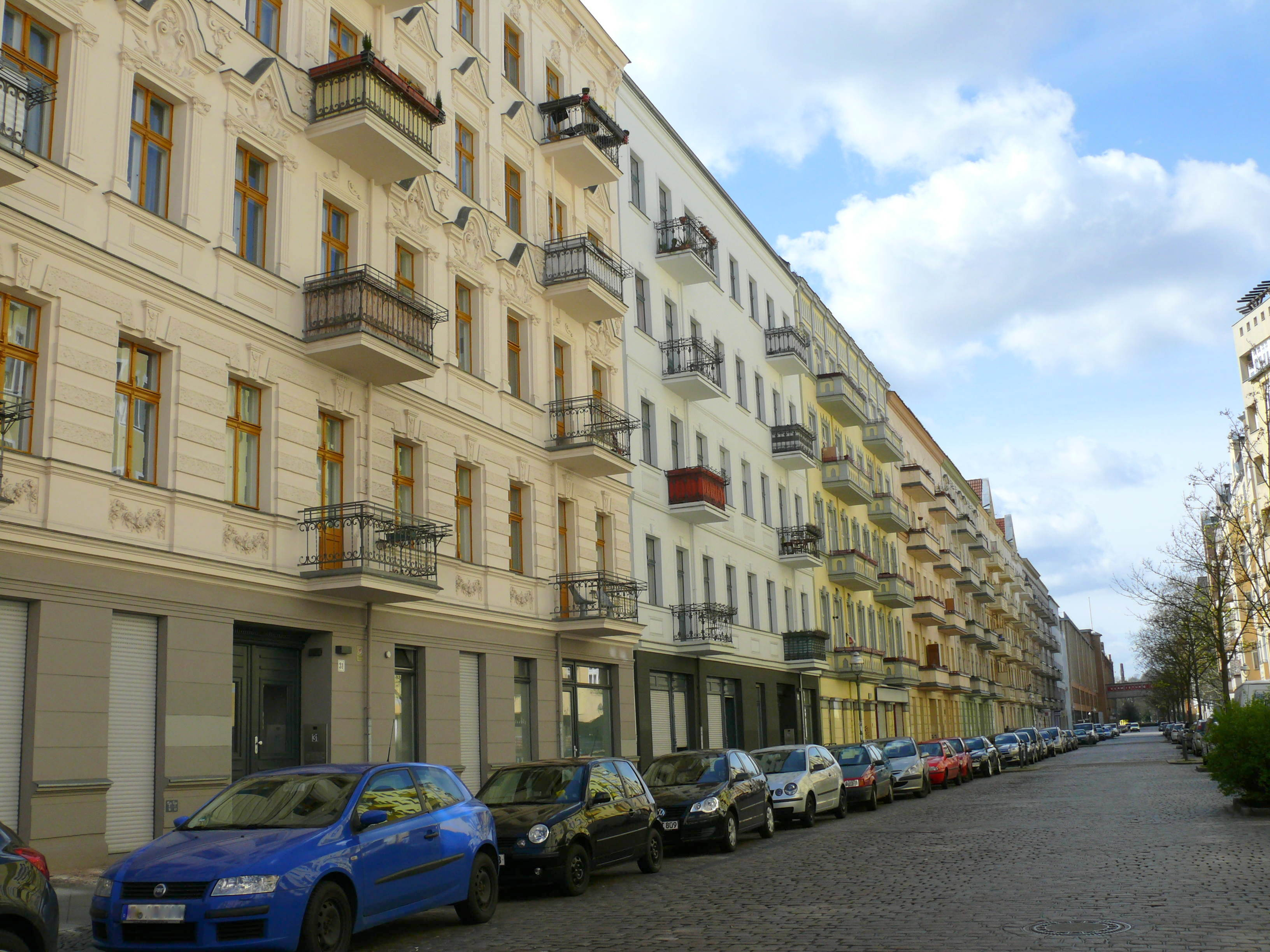
Typical houses in Wedding, Oudenarder Straße
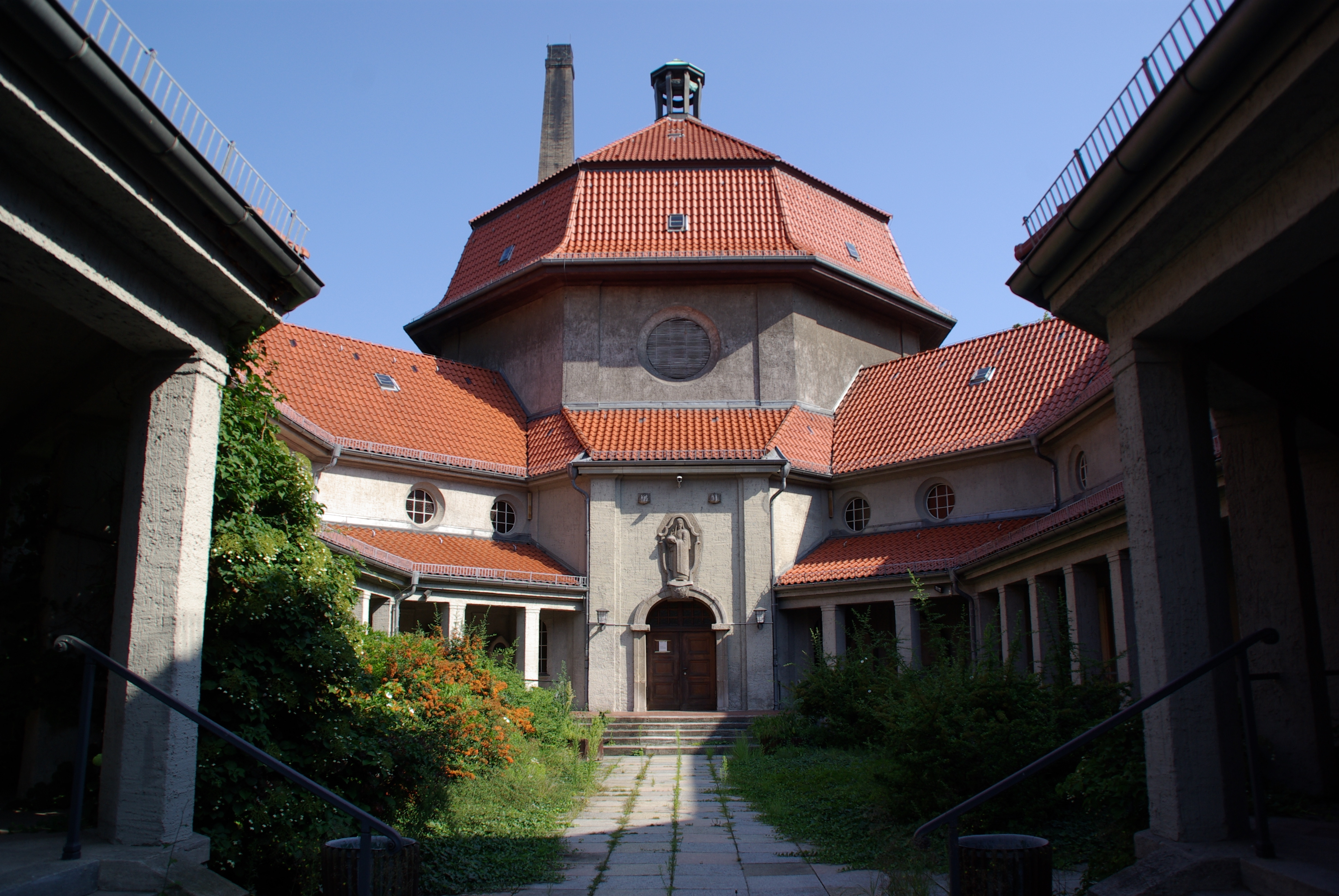
Former crematorium is today an art gallery

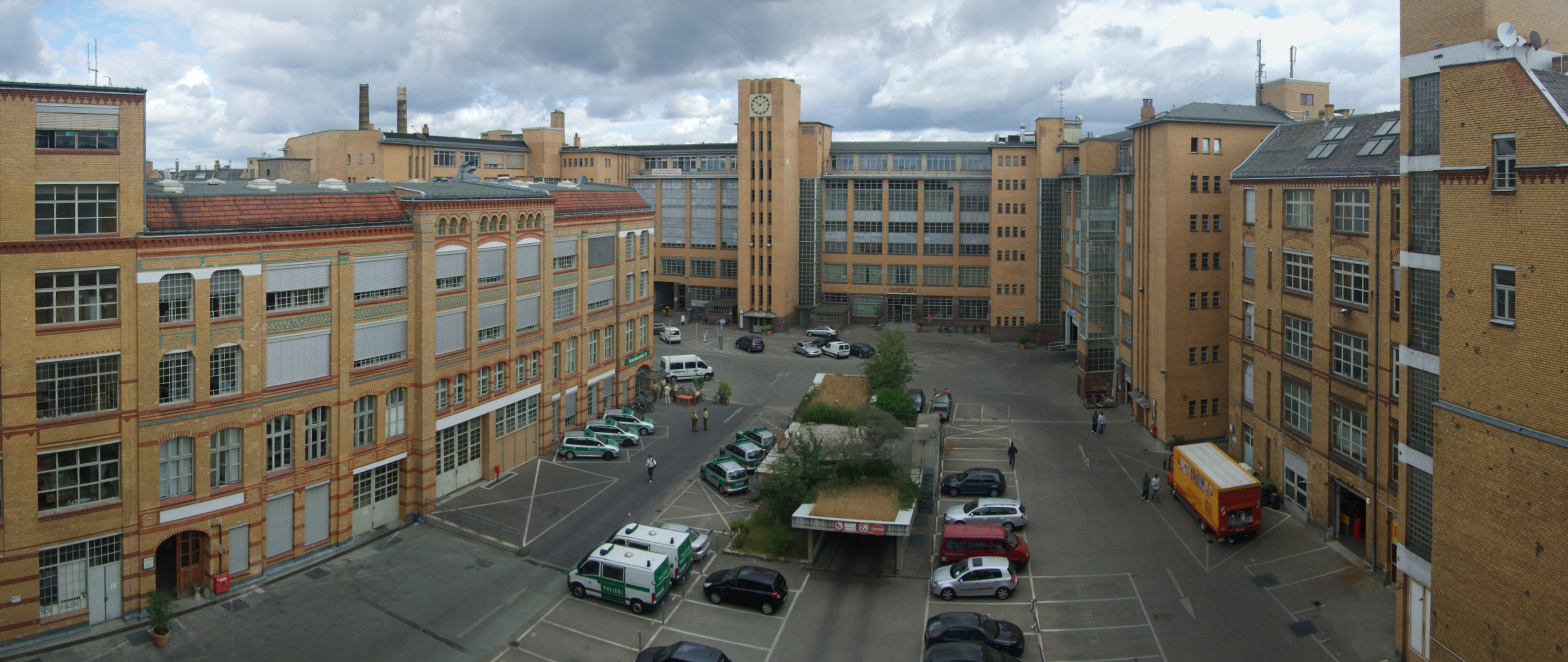
Osramhöfe, former lightbulb plant, now used for various commercials

== Literature ==
- Komander, Gerhild: Der Wedding – Auf dem Weg von Rot nach Bunt. Berlin Story Verlag, Berlin 2006, ISBN 3-929829-38-X.
- Schmiedecke, Ralf: Berlin-Wedding – Neue Bilder aus alter Zeit. Sutton, Erfurt 2005, ISBN 3-89702-866-2 (Reihe Archivbilder).
- Simon, Christian: 750 Jahre Wedding – Eine Chronik. Berlin 2001, ISBN 3-8311-1777-2.
- Werning, Heiko: Mein wunderbarer Wedding. Geschichten aus dem Prekariat. Edition Tiamat, Berlin 2010, ISBN 978-3-89320-143-3.
- Scheer, Regina: Den Schwächeren helfen, stark zu sein. Die Schrippenkirche im Berliner Wedding 1882–2007. Hentrich & Hentrich Verlag, Berlin, ISBN 978-3-938485-63-7.
