= Marie Kunert =

German politician (1871–1957)

Member of Reichstag
- In office 1928–1933

Member of Landtag of Prussia
- In office 1921–1928

Personal details
- Born: Marie Bombe; 20 May 1871; Wedding, Berlin, German Empire
- Died: 28 May 1957 (aged 86); Berlingen, Switzerland
- Political party: Independent Social Democratic Party (USPD) (1917-1922); Social Democratic Party (SPD) (1922-1933)

Marie Kunert (20 May 1871 – 28 May 1957) was a German socialist politician and educator. She was a member of the Landtag of Prussia from 1921 until 1928 and member of the Reichstag during the Weimar Republic from 1928 to 1933. In 1933, Kunert went into exile in Switzerland and never returned to Germany.

== Biography ==
Kunert was born on 20 May 1871 as Marie Bombe in the 3rd District (Wedding) of Berlin. She became a teacher in English and French, and also worked as a translator. In 1890, she married Fritz Kunert.

In 1917, Kunert became a member of the Independent Social Democratic Party (USPD), a centrist Marxist party. In 1918, she became an editor for the press office of the Soviet Embassy. In 1921, Kunert was elected to Landtag of Prussia. In 1922, she changed to the Social Democratic Party. Kunert served in the Landtag until 1928 when she was elected to the Reichstag of the Weimar Republic. She was re-elected four times and served until 1933. In 1931, her husband died. In 1933, the Nazi Party came to power, and Kunert went into exile in Switzerland. She never returned to Germany.

On 28 May 1957, Kunert died at the age of 86 in Berlingen.
