= Cornelius Fredericks =

Oorlam political and military leader, Captain of the ǃAman (r. 1893–1907)

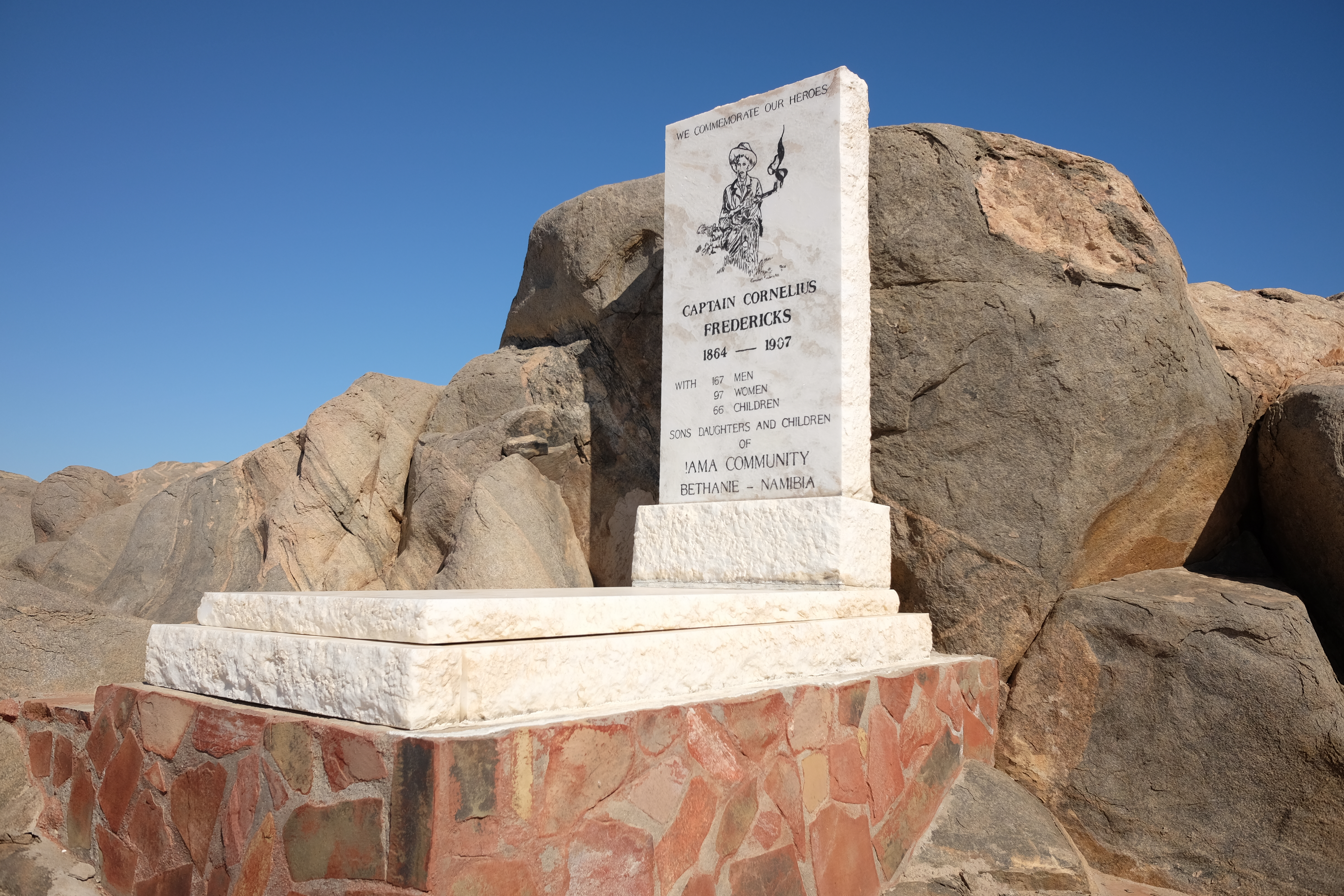
- Gravestone of Fredericks on Shark Island

Captain of the ǃAman
- Reign: 1893 – 16 February 1907; Disputed with Paul Frederiks
- Predecessor: Paul Frederiks
- Successor: Position abolished Eduard Frederiks (1916)
- Died: 16 February 1907; Shark Island concentration camp, Lüderitz, German South West Africa
- Military career
- Allegiance: ǃAman
- Conflicts: Herero Wars (surrendered)

Cornelius Fredericks (also Frederiks; died 16 February 1907) was an Oorlam political and military leader who was captain of the ǃAman (Bethanie Orlam), an Oorlam subtribe located in southern German South West Africa (today Namibia) from 1893 until his death in 1907. A rival to the pro-German Paul Frederiks for the captainship of the ǃAman, Cornelius was one of the leaders of the Oorlam during the Herero Wars, for which he was captured and imprisoned by the German Empire.

When the Herero Wars of 1904–1907 broke out, Fredericks was one of the indigenous leaders that actively fought a guerrilla war against the Germans. He often sided with Hendrik Witbooi, leader of the ǀKhowesin (Witbooi Orlam), and both were wanted for a 3,000 marks (ℳ) ransom. The German Schutztruppe kept the upper hand in the majority of battles and forced most Nama and Orlam groups to surrender. The group under Fredericks gave up on 3 March 1906.

On 9 September 1906, Cornelius Fredericks was imprisoned at Shark Island concentration camp in Lüderitz as part of a group of 1,795 Nama people, some of whom were decapitated and whose heads were sent to Germany for racial anthropological research. Most of them died in the icy wind due to malnutrition and neglect, their bodies were buried at low tide and soon washed into the ocean. Fredericks died on 16 February 1907. A memorial in his remembrance now stands on Shark Island.

Cornelius Fredericks's grandson David Frederick was chief of the !Aman Traditional Authority from 1977 until 2018. David Frederick, in January 2017 filed a class-action lawsuit against Germany on behalf of the Herero and Nama peoples in the U.S. District Court for the Southern District of New York. The lawsuit, filed along with the Nama Traditional Authorities Association and the Herero Paramount Chief Advocate Vekuii Rukoro, was dismissed by the court in 2020 for a lack of jurisdiction.
