= Basking Sharks (band) =

English indie pop band

Basking Sharks were a synth-pop band that formed in 1980 in Lancaster, England, becoming a significant member of the scene in the city and going on to tour in the wider UK. Their music merged power pop with European influences and experimentation and they were a notable example of British "Indie Synth Pop". Members were Adrian Todd, Ged McPhail and Martyn Eames who used a variety of home-made electronic instruments supplemented by second hand synths that had been customised to provide unique sounds. On stage they always played “live” without the use of backing tracks and their stage act included a slide show, films and computer visuals synced into the stage performance. They produced a single, an EP and an LP, numerous videos, and live recordings. They supported John Peel at a Lancaster gig which prompted him to invite them to record at Maida Vale for his radio show. In 1987 they separated to pursue different projects. Adrian and Martyn formed the industrial technical band Degree 33. Ged moved to Newcastle upon Tyne joining Madam X. Today Adrian and Martyn are working on a new project encompassing old and new technology with a view to live performance and internet release. Ged is developing a recording studio in South Korea. Basking Sharks are still a performing unit but play rarely. A 'best of' CD, Back from the Deep Water was self-released as a CD in 2004 and then re-released in 2019 as an LP and digital download by the Mental Experience label of the Guerssen record label group. A "Basking Sharks" craft beer directly named after the group is also brewed in tribute to them by the Accidental Brewery in Lancaster that now occupies the band's former rehearsal space.

== Discography ==
=== Albums ===
- "Shark Island" (1983), LP, Raw Shark

=== EPs ===
- "Thrill of the Game" (1983), 7", SRR

=== Singles ===
- "Diamond Age" (1983), 7", Fin

=== Compilation albums ===
- "Sharkassette" (1984), Cassette, Self-released, Half live
- "Back From Deep Water (Sharkive: 1981 - 1987)"
  - 2003, CD, Self-released
  - 2019, LP, Guerssen/Mental Experience
  - 2019, Digital Download, Guerssen/Mental Experience

=== Compilation appearances ===
- "Croatia" released on "Electrical Language (Independent British Synth Pop 78-84)" (2019), Cherry Red

=== Music videos ===
- "Angel"
- "Only The Good Die Young"
- "Thrill Of The Game"

== See also ==
- List of Peel sessions
- Category:Peel Sessions recordings
