= Plötzensee (lake) =

Lake in Berlin

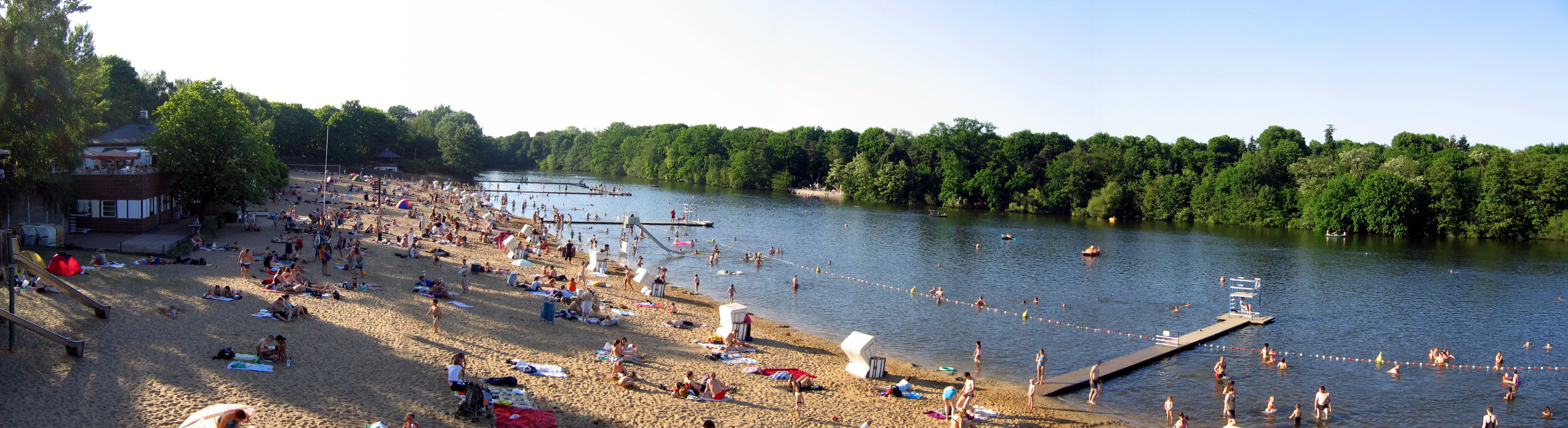
- Bathing beach

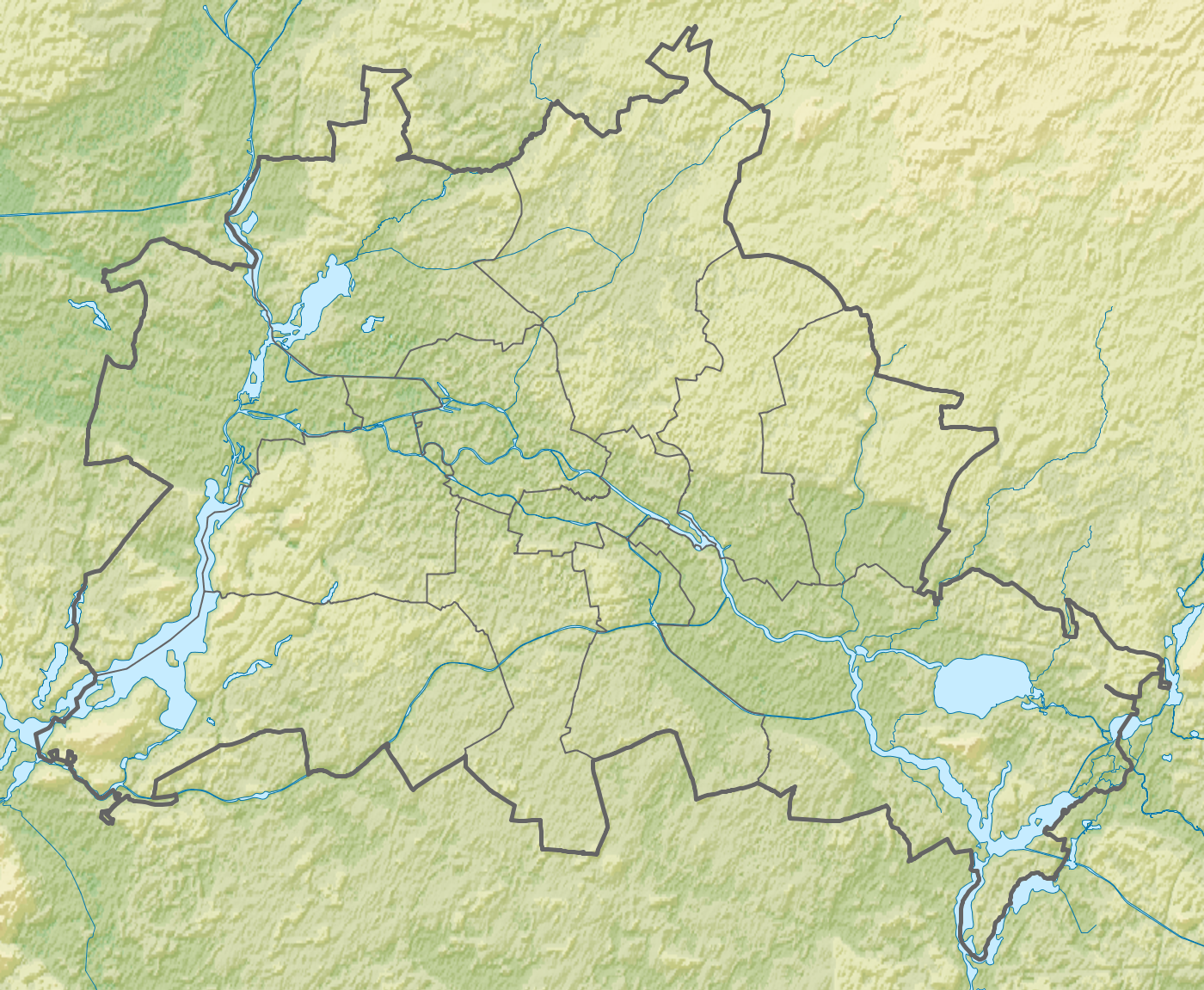
- Location within Berlin
- Location: Wedding, Mitte, Berlin
- Coordinates: 52°32′39″N 13°19′49″E
- Basin countries: Germany
- Surface area: 7.7 ha (19 acres)
- Max. depth: 5.5 m (18 ft)

Plötzensee (German: [ˈplœtsənzeː]) is a small glacial lake in Berlin. It is situated in the former borough of Wedding, now a part of Mitte, adjacent to the public park Volkspark Rehberge. The name stems from Plötze, one name for the Common Roach fish in German, as the lake formerly teemed with them.

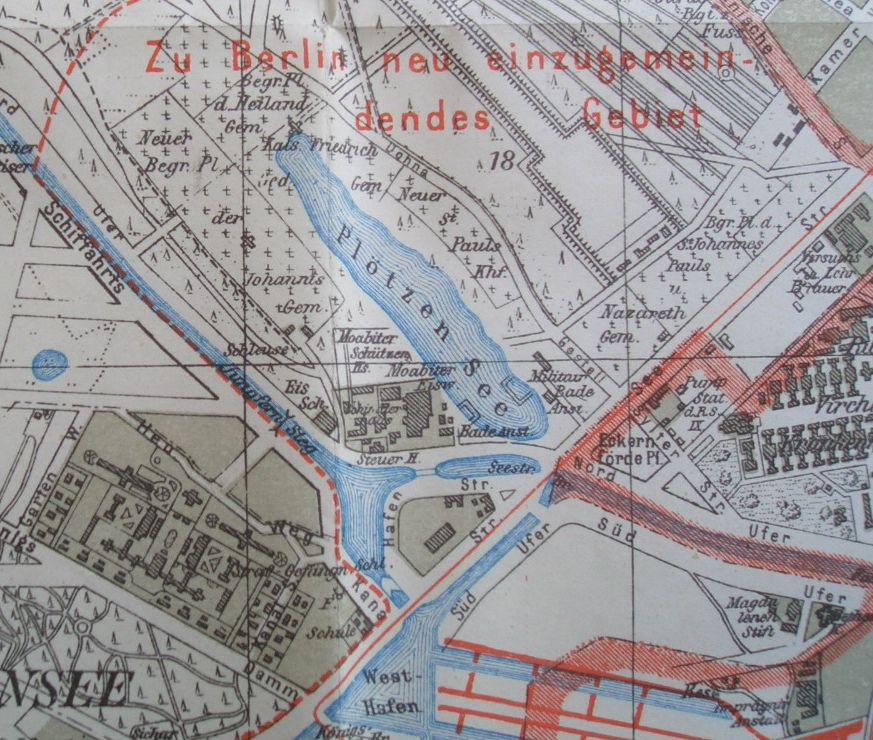
Plötzensee lake (centre) and prison (lower left)

Plötzensee is part of a chain of lakes stretching from the northeast to the Spree valley, formed in the last ice age. Until 1443, the nunnery of St. Mary at Spandau had the rights to the lake, but these were eventually assumed by the Prussian treasury. In 1817, the city of Berlin bought the lake and leased the rights to the shoreline and fishing.

The first public bath opened about 1850 and over the years, there have been an army sporting ground, a man-made beach (photo), an inn, and the conversion of the shore into a public park in the 1920s.

Plötzensee also gives its name to Plötzensee Prison, built nearby in the 19th century, which reached its height of notoriety in the time of Nazi Germany.
