= Shark Island concentration camp =

Imperial German concentration camp in Luderitz, colonial Namibia (1905–1907)

Coordinates: 26°38′45″S 15°9′14″E

Shark Island
- Concentration camp
- Prisoners at the camp

- Location within Namibia
- Other names: Konzentrationslager auf der Haifischinsel vor Lüderitzbucht
- Location: Lüderitz, German South West Africa
- Operated by: Imperial German Army
- Original use: Officially a prisoner of war camp, in reality a civilian internment camp, described by some as a death camp or even extermination camp
- Operational: 1905–1907
- Inmates: Herero, Nama
- Killed: Unknown (estimates range between 1,032 and 3,000)

Shark Island or "Death Island" (German: Haifischinsel or Todesinsel) was one of five concentration camps in German South West Africa. It was located on Shark Island off Lüderitz, in the far south-west of the territory which today is Namibia. It was used by the German Empire during the Herero and Nama genocide of 1904–08. Between 1,032 and 3,000 Herero and Nama men, women, and children died in the camp between March 1905 and its closing in April 1907.

== Background ==
On 12 January 1904, the Herero people rebelled against German colonial rule under the leadership of Samuel Maharero. Origins of the Herero revolt date back to the 1890s when tribes settled in Namibia came under pressure from the growing number of German settlers wanting their land, cattle, and labor. Factors such as property loss, debt incurred from attempts to resettle lost herds, low wages on white-owned farms, and racial inequalities intensified the hostility between the Herero and the Germans.

When the Herero rebelled, they killed over 100 German settlers near the town of Okahandja. Over 15,000 German reinforcements under the command of Lothar von Trotha defeated the Herero force at the Waterberg River in August 1904.

Two months later, the Nama people, under the command of Hendrik Witbooi, launched a similar rebellion against German colonists. Traditional rivalries prevented the Herero and Nama from joining forces; however, both groups waged guerrilla warfare against the German colonial forces.

Following the abandonment of Lothar von Trotha's policy of exterminating the Herero within the borders of German South West Africa (by poisoning them or denying them access to water sources in the desert), the colonial authorities adopted a policy of sweeping the bush clear of Herero – both civilians and rebels – and removing them to concentration camps.

== Operation ==
=== Establishment ===
Although there are records of Herero prisoners of war being held in Lüderitz Bay as early as 1904, the first references to a camp on Shark Island, and the transfer of large numbers of Herero prisoners from Keetmanshoop, date from March 1905.

Deaths in the camp began early, with 59 men, 59 women and 73 children reportedly dead by late May 1905. The island's cold climate was unsuitable for habitation, particularly for people used to the dry, arid climate of the veld. Despite this, the German authorities continued to transfer people from the interior to the island, ostensibly because of a lack of food in the interior, but also because they wished to use the prisoners as labour in constructing a railway connecting Lüderitz with Aus.

=== Arrival of the Nama ===
Whilst the Germans initially followed a policy of sending people from the south to concentration camps in the north, and vice versa, meaning that Nama prisoners mostly went to concentration camps around the city of Windhoek, by mid-1906 Germans in Windhoek were becoming increasingly concerned about the presence of so many prisoners in their city.

In response to these concerns, in August 1906 the Germans began to transfer Nama prisoners to Shark Island, sending them by cattle-car to Swakopmund and then by sea to Lüderitz. The Nama leader, Samuel Isaak, protested this, saying that their transfer to Lüderitz had not been part of the agreement under which they had surrendered to the Germans, however, the Germans ignored these protests. By late 1906, 2,000 Nama were held prisoner on the island.

=== Closing ===
The decision to close the camp was made by Major Ludwig von Estorff, the new commander of the Schutztruppe of German South West Africa who had signed the agreement under which the Witbooi (a Nama tribe) had surrendered to the Germans, after a visit to the camp in early 1907. After the closing of the camp, prisoners were transferred to an open area near Radford Bay. Whilst mortality rates initially remained high in the new camp, they eventually declined.

== Living conditions ==
=== Conditions at the camp ===
Word quickly spread among the Herero of the conditions at the camp, with prisoners in other parts of German South West Africa reportedly committing suicide rather than be deported to Lüderitz due to the stories of harsh conditions there in late 1905. Due to the camp's reputation, detainees were not told where they were being sent to reduce the chance of revolt or escape. The Cape Argus, a South African newspaper, also ran stories describing terrible conditions at the camp in late September 1905. One transport rider, who was described as having been employed at the camp in early 1905, was quoted as saying:

The women who are captured and not executed are set to work for the military as prisoners ... saw numbers of them at Angra Pequena (i.e., Lüderitz) put to the hardest work, and so starved that they were nothing but skin and bones [...] They are given hardly anything to eat, and I have very often seen them pick up bits of refuse food thrown away by the transport riders. If they are caught doing so, they are sjamboked (whipped).

August Kuhlmann was one of the first civilians to visit the camp. What he witnessed shocked him as he described in September 1905:

A woman, who was so weak from illness that she could not stand, crawled to some of the other prisoners to beg for water. The overseer fired five shots at her. Two shots hit her: one in the thigh, the other smashing her forearm... In the night she died.

Many cases of rape of prisoners by Germans were reported at the camp. Although some of these cases did result in the perpetrator being successfully punished where a "white champion" took up the victim's cause, the majority of cases went unpunished.

Other factors such as minimal food rations, uncontrolled diseases, and maltreatment led to high mortality rates. Prisoners typically received a handful of uncooked rice. Diseases such as typhoid spread quickly. Prisoners were concentrated in large, unsanitary living quarters with negligible medical attention. Beatings occurred frequently as the German officials often used the sjambok to force prisoners to work.

=== Extreme Climate, Geography & Substandard Housing ===
Shark Island is a barren, rocky peninsula flanked by the Namib Desert and the Atlantic Ocean, characterized by gale-force winds, cold night temperatures, dense coastal fog, and a lack of natural freshwater. German colonial authorities intentionally placed the camp at the far windswept tip of the island to weaponize the severe environmental elements against the prisoners. Inmates were confined to small zones fenced in by barbed wire or thorn bushes. Prisoners were forced to construct their own makeshift dwellings (pontoks) out of canvas, blankets, or military tents, which provided little protection against freezing temperatures, winds, and sea spray.

=== Severe Starvation & Unnatural Diet ===
Rations were minimal, consisting of a daily allowance of a handful of raw, uncooked rice, salt, and water. Rice was an unfamiliar foodstuff to the indigenous OvaHerero and Nama populations. This nutrient-deficient and unfamiliar diet caused widespread digestive illness, emaciation, severe bowel disease, and fatal scurvy (vitamin C deficiency, which left distinct pathognomonic traces on skeletal remains).

=== Exhausting Forced labour ===
The prisoners held on Shark Island were used as forced labour throughout the camp's existence. This labour was made available by the German army Etappen Kommando for use by private companies throughout the Lüderitz area, working on infrastructure projects such as railway construction, the building of the harbour, serving the white settlers, and flattening and levelling Shark Island through the use of explosives. Transport riders recorded women carrying heavy grain sacks or stretchers while nursing infants on their backs, being continuously beaten with leather whips (sjamboks) by soldiers when they collapsed. This highly dangerous and physical work inevitably led to large-scale sickness and death amongst the prisoners, with one German technician complaining that the 1,600-strong Nama workforce had shrunk to a strength of only 30–40 available for work due to 7–8 deaths occurring daily by late 1906. The policy of forced labour officially ended when prisoner-of-war status for the Herero and Nama was revoked on 1 April 1908, although Herero and Nama continued to labour on colonial projects after this.

=== Uncontrolled Disease & Total Medical Neglect ===
Overcrowding, unhygienic living quarters, inadequate clothing, and a near-total lack of medical attention allowed diseases like typhoid, scurvy, and severe bowel infections to spread uncontrollably.

Freezing ocean winds combined with wet, inadequate clothing and malnutrition resulted in high death tolls from hyperthermia and exposure.

=== Physical Abuse, Torture & Executions ===
Guards routinely whipped prisoners with the sjambok with full force. Inmates faced physical torture, poisoning, and widespread sexual violence and rape by soldiers. Public executions were performed on the eastern side of the island facing Lüderitz in full view of the town, near an execution room located where the lighthouse stands today.

=== Medical Exploitation & Mutilation of Human Remains ===
At Field Hospital XII on the island, by a research was conducted by the doctor Eugen Fischer, later a prominent Nazi scientist (military doctors such as Stabsarzt Dr. Hugo Bofinger) conducted autopsies on deceased prisoners, preserving organs, brains, and severed heads in formalin-filled metal canisters to send to universities in Berlin for "racial-anthropological" research.

Captive female prisoners were forced to boil heads of their dead inmates (some of whom may have been their relatives or acquaintances) and use glass shards or tools to scrape the flesh off the severed heads of dead inmates (including Nama Captain Cornelius Fredericks) before the skulls were shipped to German universities.

Head of Shark Island prisoner used for medical experimentation

This work was performed at the camp at Swakopmund, and some of these experiments were conducted by the German doctors to develop their race theories about the evolutionary proximity of Indigenous Africans to apes.

=== Mortality & Disposal of Bodies ===
Mortality rates ranged between 70% and over 80% of all prisoners sent to Shark Island, claiming thousands of lives. Death rates reached between 12 and 20+ people per day. Cartloads of bodies were taken to the back beach at low tide and buried in shallow sand, allowing the rising tide to sweep the bodies out as food for sharks, or thrown directly into harbour waters. Other victims were carried on stretchers by fellow inmates to mainland beaches near Radford Bay and buried in shallow individual and mass graves.

== Death toll ==
The precise number of deaths at the camp is unknown. A report by the German Imperial Colonial Office estimated a death toll of 7,682 Herero and 2,000 Nama across all of the camps in German South West Africa, a significant portion of them at Shark Island. A military official at the camp estimated that 1,032 out of the 1,795 prisoners held at the camp in September 1906 had since died, and ultimately only 245 of these prisoners survived. In December 1906, an average of 8.5 prisoners died per day. By March 1907, according to records, 1,203 Nama prisoners had died on the island. The overall figure for deaths at the camp has been estimated to be as high as 3,000. Combined with deaths amongst prisoners held elsewhere in Lüderitz Bay, the total may well exceed 4,000.

The vast majority of these prisoners died through preventable diseases such as typhoid and scurvy, exacerbated by malnutrition, over-work, and the unsanitary conditions in the camps.

== See also ==
- German South West Africa
- Herero Wars
- Herero and Namaqua Genocide
- Research Materials: Max Planck Society Archive

== Sources ==
- Adhikari, Mohamed (2008). Silvester, Jeremy; Gewald, Jan-Bart; Erichsen, Casper; Zimmerer, Jürgen; Zeller, Joachim (eds.). "'Streams of Blood and Streams of Money': New Perspectives on the Annihilation of the Herero and Nama Peoples of Namibia, 1904–1908" (PDF). Kronos. 34 (1): 303–320.
- Bartrop, Paul R.; Jacobs, Steven Leonard (2014). Modern Genocide: The Definitive Resource and Document Collection. ABC-CLIO.
- Drechsler, Horst (1986). Let Us Die Fighting: The Struggle of the Herero and Nama against German Imperialism (1884–1915) (3rd ed.). Berlin: Akademie-Verlag.
- Erichsen, Casper W. (2005). The angel of death has descended violently among them: Concentration camps and prisoners-of-war in Namibia, 1904–08. Leiden: University of Leiden African Studies Centre. ISBN 90-5448-064-5.
- Erichsen, Casper; Olusoga, David (2010). The Kaiser's Holocaust: Germany's Forgotten Genocide and the Colonial Roots of Nazism. Faber & Faber.
- Gewald, Jan-Bart (1999). Herero Heroes: A Socio-Political History of the Herero of Namibia 1890–1923. Oxford: James Currey. ISBN 0-85255-754-X.
- Lau, Brigitte (May 1995). History and Historiography: 4 essays in reprint. Windhoek: Discourse/MSORP.
- Sarkin, Jeremy (2011). Germany's Genocide of the Herero: Kaiser Wilhelm II, His General, His Settlers, His Soldiers. Cape Town: UCT Press. ISBN 978-1919895475.
- Report on the natives of South West Africa and their treatment by Germany (Report). London: His Majesty's Stationery Office. 1918.
- Zimmerer, Jürgen; Zeller, Joachim (2003). Völkermord in Deutsch-Südwestafrika: Der Kolonialkrieg 1904–1908 (in German). Berlin: Links. ISBN 978-3-86153-303-0.
- Forensis, Forensic Architecture (2024): Shark Island An Architectural Reconstruction of a Death Camp. Berlin/London
- Forensic Architecture (2024): German Colonial Genocide in Namibia: Shark Island
