= Manga Bell =

Manga Bell is a Cameroonian surname.

Notable people with the surname include:

- Manga Ndumbe Bell (1851–1908), a leader of the Duala people
- Rudolf Duala Manga Bell (1873–1914), a Duala king and resistance leader
- Alexandre Douala Manga Bell (1897–1966), son of above, Duala leader, German officer and French politician
