= Shark Island, Namibia =

Shark Island Haifischinsel
- Peninsula
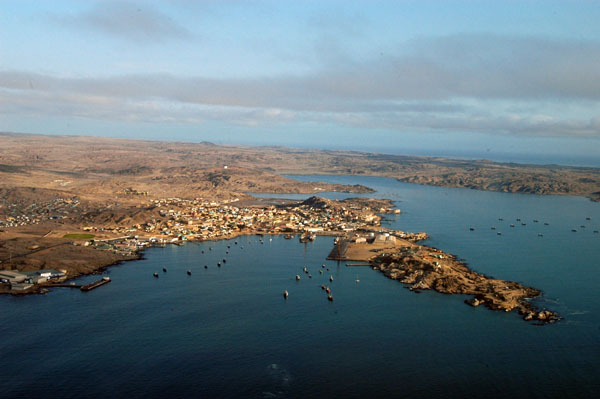

- Location within Namibia
- Coordinates: 26°38′S 15°09′E
- Country: Namibia
- Region: ǁKaras Region
- Constituency: ǃNamiǂNûs Constituency
- Establishment: 1904–05
- Founder: German Empire

Shark Island (German: Haifischinsel) is a small peninsula adjacent to the coastal city of Lüderitz in Namibia. Its area is about 40 hectares (99 acres). Formerly an island, it became a peninsula from 1906 on by the creation of a wide land connection that doubled its former size.

It had been formerly named Star Island by British Captain Thomas Alexander during his 1795 surveying expedition.

== Concentration camp ==
The island was site of Shark Island concentration camp. It was Namibia's first large-scale death camp. Close to 1,800 Nama prisoners arrived in September 1906, including Cornelius Frederiks, one of the strongest Nama military leaders.

Shark Island has been called the "blueprint" for what the Nazis would later perpetrate in the Holocaust during World War II. Long before Hitler or the Nazis, the Germans shipped the Nama people to a remote location, where they performed experiments on the Nama and worked them to death.
