= Cutie Honey (disambiguation) =

Cutie Honey is a Japanese manga series.

Cutie Honey may also refer to:

- Cutie Honey, a 2004 film
  - Re: Cutie Honey, an anime OVA based on the film
- The Live, a 2007-2008 television series
- Cutie Honey Universe, a 2018 anime series
- New Cutie Honey, a 1994 anime series
- Cutie Honey Flash, a 1997 anime series
- Cutie Honey: Tears, a 2016 film
