= Music of Cutie Honey =

Album by Takeo Watanabe

The music of Cutie Honey spans many soundtracks, including Cutey Honey: TV Original B.G.M. Collection and New Super Android Cutey Honey: Music Collection Vol. 1 by Columbia Records, and Koda Kumi's Love & Honey by Avex Group under the Rhythm Zone label.

== Cutey Honey: TV Original B.G.M. Collection ==
Cutey Honey: TV Original B.G.M. Collection

Soundtrack album by Takeo Watanabe
- Released: Vinyl; May 21, 1982; CD; February 1, 1990
- Genre: Anime
- Length: 48:03
- Language: Japanese
- Label: Columbia

Cutey Honey: TV Original B.G.M. Collection (テレビオリジナルBGMコレクション キューティーハニー, Terebi Orijinaru BGM Korekushon Kyūtī Hanī), or simply Cutey Honey: BGM Collection, is the soundtrack to the original 1973 Cutie Honey anime. The soundtrack was released on vinyl (product number CX-7054) by Columbia Records on May 21, 1982. Columbia would re-release the soundtrack on compact disc several times: on February 1, 1990 (CC-4586), on June 21, 1995 (COCC-12683), on November 28, 2000, and on September 25, 2003 (COCC-72028) as the 28th installment of the first volume of the ANIMEX 1200 series.

This album includes compositions by the show's composer Takeo Watanabe (渡辺岳夫, Watanabe Takeo). It also includes the original version of the Honey theme song, performed by Yoko Maekawa (前川陽子, Maekawa Yōko). The closing theme was also performed by her as well. Like a lot of soundtracks released at that time, the music scores in this release are abridged in order to meet the then standard limit of tracks.

Cutey Honey: TV Original B.G.M. Collection
No.	Title	Length
1.	"Cutey Honey" (キューティーハニー(前川陽子) Kyūtī Hanī (Maekawa Yōko))	1:34
2.	"Saint Chapel Gakuen: Seinaru Kane no Oto / Gakuen Seikatsu / Honey Dassō ~Histler no Theme~ / Dasshutsu Seikō" (聖(セント)チャペル学園:聖なる鐘の音/学園生活/ハニー脱走~ヒストラーのテーマ~/脱出成功 Sento Chaperu Gakuen: Seinaru Kane no Oto / Gakuen Seikatsu / Hanī Dassō ~ Hisutorā no Tēma ~/ Dasshutsu Seikō)	4:33
3.	"Panther Claw: Josei Kaizō Ningen ~Amazoness~ / Panther Claw no Dokuga / Himitsu Kōsakuin / Hyō no Tsume wa Hōseki ga O-Suki" (パンサークロー(豹の爪):女性改造人間~アマゾネス~/パンサークローの毒牙/秘密工作員/豹の爪は宝石がお好き Hyō no Tsume: Josei Kaizō Ningen ~ Amazonesu ~/ Pansākurō no Dokuga / Himitsu Kōsakuin / Hyō no Tsume wa Hōseki ga O-Suki)	6:40
4.	"Kisaragi Honey no Himitsu: Fuan ~Kisaragi Hakase no Shi~ / Kanashiki Android ~Kūchū Genso Kotei Sōchi~/ Kunō / Tatakai e no Ketsui" (如月ハニーの秘密:不安~如月博士の死~/悲しきアンドロイド~空中元素固定装置~/苦悩/戦いへの決意 Kisaragi Hanī no Himitsu: Fuan ~ Kisaragi Hakase no Shi ~/ Kanashiki Andoroido ~ Kūchū Genso Kotei Sōchi ~/ Kunō / Tatakai e no Ketsui)	4:45
5.	"Miyo! Honey no Shichihenge: Semarikuru Kuroi Kage / Hurricane Honey Tōjō / Dancing! Misty Honey / Kusen!! Flash Honey / Cutey Honey no Theme" (見よ!ハニーの七変化:せまりくる黒い影/ハリケーンハニー登場/ダンシング!ミスティハニー/苦戦!!フラッシュハニー/キューティーハニーのテーマ Miyo! Hanī no Shichihenge: Semarikuru Kuroi Kage / Harikēn Hanī Tōjō / Danshingu! Misuti Hanī / Kusen!! Furasshu Hanī / Kyūtī Hanī no Tēma)	5:07
6.	"Flash Bridge: Bridge 1 / Bridge 2 / Bridge 3 / Bridge 4 / Bridge 5 / Bridge 6 / Bridge 7" (フラッシュ・ブリッジ:ブリッジ1/ブリッジ2/ブリッジ3/ブリッジ4/ブリッジ5/ブリッジ6/ブリッジ7 Furasshu Burijji: Burijji 1 / Burijji 2 / Burijji 3 / Burijji 4 / Burijji 5 / Burijji 6 / Burijji 7)	1:58
7.	"Hayami Ikka Koko ni Ari: Honey-chan Yāi!/ Bugei Hyappan Hayami Dan Hyōe / Ai no Senshi? Hayami Junpei / Honey to Seiji" (早見一家ここにあり:ハニーちゃんやーい!/武芸百般早見団兵衛/愛の戦士?早見順平/ハニーと青児 Hayami Ikka Koko ni Ari: Hanīchan Yāi!/ Bugei Hyappan Hayami Dan Hyōe / Ai no Senshi? Hayami Junpei / Hanī to Seiji)	5:07
8.	"Fashionable Honey: Dress Up / Dandy ni Machi o... / Honey no Kyūjitsu / Honey no Tameiki" (ファッショナブル・ハニー:ドレスアップ/ダンディに街を.../ハニーの休日/ハニーのためいき Fasshonaburu Hanī: Doresu Appu / Dandi ni Machi o... / Hanī no Kyūjitsu / Hanī no Tameiki)	6:05
9.	"Kessen ~Silver Fleuret~: Tekiyaku Tōjō / Kuroki Noroi ga Honey o Nerau / Kettō / Tsuiseki / Honey Flash!/ Ai no Senshi – Cutey Honey" (決戦~シルバー・フルーレ~:敵役登場/黒き呪いがハニーを狙う/決闘/追跡/ハニー・フラッシュ!/愛の戦士・キューティーハニー Kessen ~ Shirubā Furūre ~: Tekiyaku Tōjō / Kuroki Noroi ga Hanī o Nerau / Kettō / Tsuiseki / Hanī Furasshu!/ Ai no Senshi Kyūtī Hanī)	6:09
10.	"Tsukanoma no Happy End?: Heiwa ~Senshi no Kyūsoku / Happy End / Panther Zora ~Aratanaru Teki~ / Honey Flash!" (つかの間のハッピーエンド?:平和~戦士の休息/ハッピーエンド/パンサー・ゾラ~新たなる敵~/ハニー・フラッシュ! Tsukanoma no Happī Endo?: Heiwa ~ Senshi no Kyūsoku / Happī Endo / Pansā Zora ~ Aratanaru Teki ~/ Hanī Furasshu!)	3:26
11.	"Honey's Foggy Night" (夜霧のハニー(前川陽子) Yogiri no Hanī (Maekawa Yōko))	2:42

== New Super Android Cutey Honey: Music Collection Vol. 1 ==
New Super Android Cutey Honey: Music Collection Vol. 1

Soundtrack album by Kazuhiko Toyama
- Released: February 21, 1994
- Genre: Anime
- Length: 58:02
- Language: Japanese
- Label: Nippon Columbia Co. Ltd.

New Super Android Cutey Honey chronology
New Super Android Cutey Honey: Music Collection Vol. 1	New Super Android Cutey Honey: Music Collection Vol. 2

New Super Android Cutey Honey: Music Collection Vol. 1 (新・キューティーハニーミュージックコレクション Vol.1, Shin Kyūtī Hanī Myūjikku Korekushon Vol. 1) is the licensed soundtrack to New Cutie Honey, the first Cutie Honey original video animation (OVA). It was released in Japan on February 21, 1994 (COCC-11513) by Nippon Columbia Co. Ltd. (now Columbia Music Entertainment). It would be reissued on CD-R (COR-11513) by Columbia's on-demand subsidiary R-Ban on October 21, 2001, and on March 21, 2007 (COCC-72247) as the 167th release of volume six of the Animex 1200 series.

This album features compositions by Kazuhiko Toyama, dramas (DJs) and commercial spots (CMs) with Honey's voice actor Michiko Neya, and two songs by Les 5-4-3-2-1: their rock version of the Cutie Honey opening theme used in the first four episodes, and the closing theme "Circle Game" heard in the first two.

Music Collection Vol. 1 is one of four New Cutie Honey soundtracks; a second and third Music Collection were also released, along with a Vocal Collection.

New Super Android Cutey Honey: Music Collection Vol. 1
No.	Title	Length
1.	"CM① New Cutey Honey Spot "Cutey Honey"" (CM① 新キューティーハニー スポット「キューティーハニー」 CM① Shin Kyūtī Hanī Supotto "Kyūtī Hanī")
2.	"DJ① Opening" (DJ① オープニング DJ① Ōpuningu)
3.	"Cutey Honey" (キューティーハニー Kyūtī Hanī)
4.	"DJ② Special Guest?!" (DJ② スペシャルゲスト!? DJ②Supesharu Gesuto?!)
5.	"Crime City" (犯罪都市 Hanzaitoshi)
6.	"Splendid Chase" (華麗なる追跡 Kareinaru Tsuiseki)
7.	"DJ③ Special Guest!? & Traffic Information" (DJ③ スペシャルゲスト!?&交通情報 DJ③ Supesharu Gesuto?! & Kōtsūjōhō)
8.	"Enemy Land Infiltration" (敵地潜入 Tekichi Sen'nyū)
9.	"Battle I" (戦闘I Sentō I)
10.	"Battle II" (戦闘II Sentō II)
11.	"CM② Honey Fashion Spray EX" (CM② ハニー・ファッション・スプレーEX CM② Hanī Fasshon Supurē EX)
12.	"DJ④ Special Guest & Honey's Anything Counselor Office ①" (DJ④ スペシャルゲスト&ハニーなんでも相談室① DJ④ Supesharu Gesuto?! & Hanī Nandemo Sōdanshitsu①)
13.	"Theme of Dolmeck" (ドルメックのテーマ Dorumekku no Tēma)
14.	"The Army's Attack" (軍団の攻撃 Gundan no Kōgeki)
15.	"DJ⑤ Honey's Anything Counselor Office ②" (DJ⑤ ハニーなんでも相談室② DJ⑤ Hanī Nandemo Sōdanshitsu②)
16.	"Theme of Death Star" (デス・スターのテーマ Desu Sutā no Tēma)
17.	"The Devil's Army" (悪魔の軍団 Akuma no Gundan)
18.	"Dolmeck Suspense" (ドルメック・サスペンス Dorumekku Sasupensu)
19.	"DJ⑥ Honey's Anything Counselor Office ③" (DJ⑥ ハニーなんでも相談室③ DJ⑥ Honey Nandemo Sōdanshitsu③)
20.	"Happy Danbei" (HAPPY 団兵衛 HAPPY Danbei)
21.	"Theme of Danbei" (団兵衛のテーマ Danbei no Tēma)
22.	"DJ⑦ Honey's Anything Counselor Office ④" (DJ⑦ ハニーなんでも相談室④ DJ⑦ Hanī Nandemo Sōdanshitsu④)
23.	"Theme of Panther Claw" (パンサークローのテーマ Pansā Kurō no Tēma)
24.	"Cutey Honey (Honey Flash Version)" (キューティーハニー(HONEY FLASHバージョン) Kyūtī Hanī (HONEY FLASH Bājon))
25.	"CM③ Cosplay City Bank Association" (CM③ コスプレシティー銀行連合 CM③ Cosupure Shitī Ginkō Rengō)
26.	"DJ⑧"
27.	"SEXY HONEY"
28.	"Chokkei's "Honey Traffic Report"" (直慶の「ハニー寝起きレポート」 Chokkei no "Hanī Neoki Repōto")
29.	"BATTLE HONEY"
30.	"To the Peaceful Town" (平和な街へ Heiwa na Machi e)
31.	"DJ⑨ The Cosplay City Just Opens" (DJ⑨ コスプレシティー只今開店 DJ⑨ Cosplay Shitī Tadaima Kaiten)
32.	"Warrior of Love" (愛の戦士 Ai no Senshi)
33.	"Love and Peace" (愛と平和 Ai to Heiwa)
34.	"DJ⑩ Ending" (DJ⑩ エンディング DJ⑩ Endingu)
35.	"ANGEL HONEY"
36.	"Extra..." (オマケ・・・ Omake...)
37.	"Circle Game: Love Song" (サークル・ゲーム～chanson d'amour～ Sākuru Gēmu~Chanson D'Amour~)

== "Love & Honey" ==
On May 26, 2004, Kumi Koda released the single "Love & Honey" which includes her cover of the main theme "Cutie Honey" as well as several other songs written for the film Cutie Honey and the OVA Re:Cutie Honey.
