= List of Papillon Rose characters =

Papillon Rose (パピヨンローゼ, Papiyon Rōze) is an erotic comedy anime series which parodies the magical girl genre, particularly Sailor Moon and Cutie Honey. A 24-minute OVA was released in 2003 followed by a six-episode TV series, broadcast in Japan in 2006. A DVD collection, containing the OVA and TV series was released in North America in 2010.

== 2003 OVA Lingerie Soldier Papillon Rose characters ==
Papillon team and friends

- Tsubomi/Papillon Rose is the young woman protagonist of this eponymous series. She is of medium height with crimson (rose pink) hair and light blue eyes. In this episode she is a high-school student in addition to being a waitress at the Lingerie Pub Papillon. She solicits help and advice from Rama and "Dandy Lion" (Hikaru). After she transforms her magical-girl lingerie costume is crimson (rose pink) in color and she identifies herself as "the crimson butterfly of the night". Voiced by: Shiho Kikuchi
- Anne is the tall and voluptuous twenty-year-old woman waitress at the Lingerie Pub Papillon. She has a darker complexion, medium length brown hair and dark blue eyes. Although a bit jealous of the attention garnered on the younger Tsubomi by the customers, she helps her young and somewhat naive friend when in need. Voiced by: Sachiko Kojima
- Hikaru/Dandy Lion is mysterious handsome young man. He has long light gray-blond hair and gray-green eyes. Tsubomi meets him by literally running into him while rushing late to work from school. He becomes her lover and adviser. The consummation of their new relationship enables Tsubomi to become the magical girl Papillon Rose. He wears a small mask when in the disguised persona of "Dandy Lion". According to the official website, "Dandy Lion" is Hikaru in a cosplay costume, not possessing any special magic abilities. Voiced by: Takehito Koyasu
- Rama is a female domestic house cat white with Siamese cat-like gray markings and a pink butterfly mark on her forehead and violet eyes. The cat wears a condom over the end of her tail in this episode. She is Tsubomi's primary adviser about her powers as the magical-girl "Papillon Rose". Voiced by: Tomoe Sakuragawa

Enemies

- Sister Biene is a middle-aged female evil minion general of Regina Apis. She is medium height with spiraled maroon hair, pointed ears, and yellowish skin. She is put off by her assignment to sexually assault men for "Dinasty" as she really prefers women. Voiced by: Sayaka Kinoshita
- Sister Pchela is a short undeveloped female evil elf-like minion general of Regina Apis. She appears to be young girl with short blue hair under a teal pointed cap. She is dislikes Sister Biene and argues and fights with her. She is later assigned to destroy Papillon Rose and continue the conquest after Sister Biene is defeated. Voiced by: Yui Sakakibara
- Sister Melitta is an overweight female evil minion general of Regina Apis. She is in medium height with purple hair twintails and a bun, pointed ears and a clown-like costume. She appears in front of Regina Apis without having a speaking role.
- Sister Abeille is a young female evil minion general of Regina Apis. She is medium height with teal messy hair, a suit consisting of leather belts, spiky translucent sleeves and a dark blue loin cloth. She appears in front of Regina Apis without having a speaking role.
- Kreuz, Karo, Hertz and Piku (called Mein Liebe by the original author) are four men assigned to bring Regina Apis to her climax. Kreuz is voiced by Danno Hiroyasu
- Regina Apis is the main antagonist of the episode. She presents a regal figure as an older female alien commander. She is bad-tempered, tall, with large breasts, blue skin, pointed ears, brown eyes and gray hair kept wound into points out each side of her head with falls that reach the floor when she stands. She also has four translucent insect-like wings on her back that may be part of her full-length, fur-collared, dark violet gown. She is the founder and leader of the organization known as Dinasty, who aim to control the world's sexual energy starting from the Shinjuku Kabukichou pleasure district of Tokyo, an assignment she that openly relishes. Voiced by: Yuki Masuda

Others

- Manager is the excitable unnamed middle-aged male manager of the Lingerie Pub Papillon. He tries to impose rules but his continuing extramarital affair with Anne leaves him vulnerable to blackmail by his staff. He is Sister Biene's first victim. Voiced by: Masashi Yabe
- Customer is the middle-aged man initially served by Anne at the "Lingerie Pub Papillon". Voiced by: Kayto Oohashi

== 2006 TV series Papillon Rose: The New Season characters ==
Papillon soldiers and friends

- Tsubomi/Papillon Rose is the woman protagonist of this eponymous series. She is in her 20s, of medium height with crimson hair and very light blue eyes. She is a server at the New Papillon maid cafe and spa. After she transforms her magical-girl lingerie costume is crimson (rose pink) in color and identifies herself as "the crimson butterfly of the night". Voiced by: Maria Yamamoto
- Anne/Papillon Lily is tall and voluptuous woman in her early 20s, with brown hair and blue eyes. After she transforms, her magical-girl lingerie costume is dark blue in color and identifies herself as "the jasper butterfly of the night". Eventually she becomes a server at the New Papillon maid cafe and spa. Voiced by: Kumi Kawai
- Shizuku/Papillon Margarette is a woman in her late teens, of slight build with short blond hair, gold colored eyes and glasses. She is a graduating high school student now studying for college entrance exams. After she transforms her magical-girl lingerie costume is yellow in color and identifies herself as "the golden butterfly of the night". Eventually she becomes a server at the New Papillon maid cafe and spa. Voiced by: Mai Nagai
- Torakage is a mysterious masked young male ninja with blond hair. Because of the resemblance, both Tsubomi and Rama at first mistake him to be the deceased Hikaru. Eventually he reveals that he is Hikaru's twin brother Hibiki. Voiced by: Takehito Koyasu
- Rama is a female domestic house cat with Siamese-like gray markings, a pink butterfly mark on her forehead and violet eyes. The cat wears a collar around her neck and a yellow ribbon bow on the end of her tail. She talks to Tsubomi and gives her advice. Voiced by: Mari Yoshikura

Men in Black and collaborators

- Hibiki is man wearing dark suit over a white shirt and dark glasses long blond hair. Voiced by: Takehito Koyasu
- Smith is man wearing dark suit over a yellow shirt, dark glasses and short brown hair. He has a scar over his right eye. Voiced by: Alan Smith
- Sakurada/Sautahiko is man wearing dark suit over a dark green shirt, dark glasses and short brown hair. Works on the computer in the company library much of the time. Voiced by: Isshin Chiba
- Venusian woman is a thin woman with long blond hair and eye color that change between violet to brown. She wears gray suit with a high collar. She is tells the Men in Black that she is on Earth only as an observer but will provide information to them. Voiced by: Rika Higashino

Otaku

- Kurimoto Voiced by: Motoki Takagi
- Ishimori Voiced by: Nobuo Tobita
- Kato Voiced by: Sanpei x2

Enemy alien Susanoo sisters

- Dark Empress Ran (Oldest) wears a gold winged crown with a l in the center of her forehead. She wears a long white robe with extended shoulder armor. She has long dark purple hair and eyes. Voiced by: Chiharu Minami
- Dark Advisor Sue (Middle) wears a helmet with two horns over the eyes and a blue jewel in the center of her forehead. She has blue-violet eyes and medium-length dark blue hair with a longer ponytail hanging on the back. She is taller and more full figured than her sisters and wears a white robe, open in the front, to reveal it. Voiced by: Umeka Shoji
- Dark General Miki (Youngest) wears a helmet with a gold horn in the center of her forehead with dark orange side ribbons and a short orange segmented armor skirt. She has long brown hair. She is sensitive about her short and relatively undeveloped stature. Voiced by: Hiromi Tsunakake

The forgotten ones

- Tsuchinogon is the monster in the first episode. He is an ape like giant and his power is shooting balls of fire from his snake-headed right arm. He is reduced to a tiny monkey (Hibagon/Hiba) and a small snake when Tsubomi breaks his spell with a blown kiss.
- Babagappa is the monster in the second episode. He is a large and green skinned with a shell and a beak like a turtle. He has a long deep threatening laugh. He is a powerful fighter using both feet and fists in battles. He is a fusion of the world-class pro wrestler "G. Baba" and a kappa (Kappa). He is reduced to a pair of wrestling shoes and a small kappa when the spell binding him is broken. Voiced by: Isshin Chiba
- Sparky/Prince Umayado Ten is the main opponent in the third episode. He is a thick brown-furred nine-tailed bipedal male figure with two electrical sparking rods projecting from his shoulders. He has a cat-like face with whiskers, handlebar mustache and a goatee. He also wears a small round hat. He is called "Sparky" by Miki. His powers are electrical shocks from direct contact and from the violet cards he throws. He also can disable the Papillon's spirit weapons. Once his spell is broken he decomposes into a small two-tailed "Lightening Marten" and a paper Prince Shōtoku 10,000 yen note. Voiced by: Isshin Chiba
- Isshie Mosshie Kusshie is the monster in the fourth episode. It is a giant a three-headed reptilian monster with the power to launch energy balls from any of its three mouths. Miki calls it "Triple-head". When the spell is broken it decomposes into three small pliosaur-like fin-footed reptilian aquatic animals.
- Kusanagi Dahlia is the main opponent in the fifth episode. She physically appears to be Papillon Dahlia but is a mindless murdering automaton under Miki's control. She is a fusion of the cursed sword Kusanagi and the deceased Papillon Dahlia's spirit.

Deceased characters

- Papillon Dahlia was an original Papillon team member who was killed during the battle with Regina Apis. She was in her early twenties and had short, fluffy, greenish-black hair and green eyes. Her costume was also green. She was also known as the "Jade Butterfly". Voiced by: Kikuko Inoue
- Flora was a character that important to Rama who was killed in the battle with Regina Apis. An extraterrestrial whose planet is now threatened. Rama calls out this name during the final battle with Regina Apis.
- Hikaru/Dandy Lion was Tsubomi's lover and guidance councilor killed in the battle with Regina Apis. He returns in Tsubomi's dreams. Voiced by: Takehito Koyasu
- Regina Apis was the main antagonist in the OVA episode killed in a final battle that also killed other characters. She reappears in flashbacks. Voiced by: Yuki Masuda

Others

- Manager is the manager of the "New Papillon" maid cafe and spa. He tries to impose discipline on his distracted staff and keep the operation running. He occasionally suggests good ideas during the conflicts. He takes in and becomes attached to the small animals that result from the decomposition of the monsters. Voiced by: Takashi Matsuyama

== See also ==
- List of Papillon Rose episodes
