= List of Papillon Rose episodes =

Papillon Rose (パピヨンローゼ, Papiyon Rōze) is an erotic comedy anime series which parodies the magical girl genre, particularly Sailor Moon and Cutie Honey. A 24-minute OVA was released in 2003 followed by a six-episode TV series, broadcast in Japan in 2006. A DVD collection containing the OVA and TV series was released in North Americain 2010.

== 2003 OVA Lingerie Soldier Papillon Rose ==
=== Episode list ===
| No. | Title | Original release date |
|---|---|---|
| 1 | "Tsubomi's Dreams Blossom in the Night"; Transliteration: "Tsubomi no Yume wa Yoru Hiraku" (Japanese: つぼみの夢は夜開く) | April 25, 2003 |
The main character in the story is Tsubomi, a young woman working a part-time job at Lingerie Pub Papillon ("Papillon" is the French word for "butterfly" and refers to the beautiful costumed cocktail waitresses that work there). She meets a talking cat named Rama who informs her that she is the lingerie clad soldier Papillon Rose and must transform to protect the people of the city from the evil minion Sister Biene who has been sent by Regina Apis to steal people's sexual energy.

=== OVA opening and closing animation, incidental music ===
Although the opening and closing animation shows all the Papillon characters as well as Rama and Dandy Lion, Papillon Rose is the only Papillon to appear in the episode in costume. Anne appears only in her regular form. The character Shizuku (Papillon Margarette) does not appear at all. "Papillon Violet" also only appears in the final image of the opening animation with the Papillon team. The ending animation again shows the four women characters from the TV series in one scene but then only three in the ending scene.

Incidental and background music for the OVA episode is provided by KURi-ZiLL.

== 2006 TV series Papillon Rose: The New Season ==
=== Plot summary ===
Due to the previous events of the Papillon Wars in Kabukicho, the manager left the devastated area and moved in Akiba to open the maid cafe "New Papillon". Tsubomi is hired as a waitress, Shizuku attempts to pass the college entrance exams one more time and Anne simply passes her days sleeping with many random men. Tsubomi is approached by Rama, the cat, who, at first, she does not understand. But the Earth, specifically the Tokyo otaku district of Akiba, is under attack by a trio of powerful alien women along with their minions. The explosions around her restore her memories and she reassembles the rest of the Papillon team to defend the town. The Papillon team is reassembled and the enemies are won over by the team's magical-girl powers and their "charms".

=== Episode list ===
| No. | Title | Original release date |
|---|---|---|
| 1 | "Is Akiba Blooming?!"; Transliteration: "Akiba wa moete iru ka!?" (Japanese: アキバは萌えているか！？) | February 9, 2006 |
The episode begins with a flashback scene of the three Papillon soldiers motionless, prone and bruised from battle in a dark area. Regina Apis is glowering over them, laughing. The three prone Papillon soldiers join hands to empower Papillon Rose with enough energy to finally destroy Regina Apis. The scene then jumps to one year later with the "Men in Black" discussing the present situation with a Venusian woman who tells them that the invasion of the Earth will begin at a place called "Akiba" and the only ones that can stop the invasion are the "Papillon Soldiers". Tsubomi, once also known as Papillon Rose, now works at the New Papillon maid cafe and spa in Akiba and is the most popular server. Anne, once also known as Papillon Lily, is enjoying the single life. Shizuku, once also known as Papillon Margarette, is studying for college entrance exams. Due to the shock of the final battle, they have completely forgotten their magical-girl identities and events. Rama has been struggling for survival on the streets and looks it. The scene cuts to the bridge of an alien space ship where three female aliens are discussing how the "Haniwa" (people of Earth) have defiled their "holy land" and how they must reclaim it. Lacking weapons, they decide to rely on the "forgotten ones" for battle. They scour Japan from the sky and gather them up. Rama finds Tsubomi at the maid cafe and attempts communication but Tsubomi cannot understand Rama's talk as it only sounds like "meows" to her. During Rama's attempt to communicate with Tsubomi the sky darkens and a space ship appears. The aliens then begin their attack by landing their first creature, a large, ape-like monster "Tsuchinogon". The monster begins his explosive attack and the explosions draw near. Rama stimulates Tsubomi (off camera) and the excitement causes Tsubomi to remember her magical-girl identity and past events. She then transforms to her "Papillon Rose" persona. Dark General Miki appears and is immediately envious of the beautiful Rose and orders the Tsuchinogon to attack her directly. Rose is quickly outmatched and attempts to use her weapon from the battle with Sister Biene but Rama says that she must use something else (more acceptable for television broadcast). Rose finds a small toy sword and infuses it with her "spirit". She then slices Tsuchinogon a few times stopping his attack but he then gropes her breast paralyzing her. Tsuchinogon is suddenly hit in the arm with a nunchuck by a mysterious masked ninja that identifies himself as "Torakage". Freed, Tsubomi then attacks Tsuchinogon while he is temporarily stunned and breaks the spell over him with a blown kiss. Tsuchinogon decomposes into a small monkey and a tiny snake. Dark General Miki, defeated and furious, withdraws, but vows to return. The mysterious ninja Torakage also disappears.
| 2 | "Jasper and Gold Butterflies Dance in Akiba"; Transliteration: "Akiba ni mau hekigyoku to kogane no chō" (Japanese: アキバに舞う碧玉と黄金の蝶) | February 16, 2006 |
The scene starts with Tsubomi talking to Shizuku, trying to get Shizuku to remember their school days together and their magical-girl persona's as Papillon soldiers. Tsubomi then speaks to Anne and tries to get Anne to remember the past also without success. Meanwhile the Dark sisters scheme the next attack with the Dark Adviser seeking the warrior "G. Baba" but he no longer lives so she steals something from a museum. Tsubomi calls Anne and Shizuku by cell phone but neither answer. The city is then suddenly attacked by the Dark General Miki's new minion who starts his rampage by throwing cars and delivery vehicles around. Tsubomi transforms into Papillon Rose much to the delight of the otaku spectators and even the monster cheers. Rose punches him in the stomach but he is protected by a plastron. He then knocks Rose off her feet and she quickly releases that she is outmatched and needs a weapon. Anne and Shizuku witness Rose's struggles against the superior bellowing monster. A white cloth falls between the combatants and the monster stops and walks away. The cloth was dropped from above by Torakage who then carries away the unconscious Rose. Anne and Shizuku reunite with Rama and their memories return. They quickly transform into their Papillon forms to attack the monster, but are overpowered. Together they bind the monster and Rose's power breaks the spell decomposing the monster into a tiny kappa and a pair of old gym shoes (which Dark Adviser stole from the G. Baba museum display case). Dark General Miki, furious, again withdraws in defeat, but vows to return. Anne and Shizuku start work as servers at New Papillon maid cafe, much to the delight of the three otaku friends.
| 3 | "Our Seven-Hour War"; Transliteration: "Boku-ra no 7-jikan sensō" (Japanese: ぼくらの７時間戦争) | February 23, 2006 |
The otaku notice that they are having difficulty connecting their wireless computing devices. Meanwhile on the Dark sister's space ship they contemplate a new attack with disrupting the Earth's communications. Dark General Miki appears in town with a new minion she calls "Sparky". Dark Empress Ran appears as an image over the city telling the people below that they are gods that are laying claim to the city and for all of the humans to leave. The Papillon Soldiers transform but are outmatched by the new electric monster and he throws them into the river. The manager suggests to the otaku using semaphore flags to contact the others in the city. Sparky is confused by the semaphore flag waving parade of otaku presenting him with communications he cannot understand and collapses. He is "rebooted" by Miki and proceeds to defeat the Papillon team again. Then Torakage appears on the roof of a building beating a large drum. The otaku wave their flags in unison and again paralyze the monster. This gives the Papillon team a chance to attack and finally defeat the monster. Once the spell is broken "Sparky" decomposes into a small two-tailed "Lightening Marten" and a Prince Shōtoku paper 10,000 yen note.
| 4 | "Dance Once More, Jade Butterfly"; Transliteration: "Futatabi mae, hisui no chō" (Japanese: ふたたび舞え、翡翠の蝶) | March 2, 2006 |
The scene begins with the three Papillons in battle with Miki's latest minion, a three-headed monster. Together they break the spell and defeat the monster however Rose and Torakage have fallen into a hole. While alone together Rose asks if he is Hikaru as he resembles him so much. Torakage admits that Hikaru was his twin brother and Hikaru really is dead. A hole is opened and Rose is saved but Torakage has disappeared again. Tsubomi is depressed so Anne and Shizuku take her to Sakumaya where they meet two of the otaku gang who themselves are attending a memorial for Papillon Dahlia. This depresses Tsubomi even more so she walks away from the group. She daydreams of the battle and the loss of Dalia. Meanwhile Anne meets an unknown strangely dressed woman (Dark Advisor Sue) and they have dinner and drinks together. Sue is impressed by the dedication of the Papillons. They part friends. Sue later corners one of the Men in Black, "Sakurada", she identifies as "Sautahiko" who is revealed to be a spy for the Dark sisters.
| 5 | "The Crimson Butterfly Dies"; Transliteration: "Shinku no chō, chiru" (Japanese: 真紅の蝶、散る) | March 9, 2006 |
Thanks to Dark Advisor Sue's penetration of the Men in Black's database the Dark sisters now know the identities of the Papillon Soldiers and that they work at the New Papillon maid cafe and spa. Meanwhile Sakurada reveals to Hibiki that he is an enemy spy and also knows that Hibiki is "Torakage". The two furiously battle and seriously injure each other, both collapse in a draw. Meanwhile at New Papillon the Dark sister Miki and a mysterious shrouded woman show up, attack the manager and terrify the otaku customers. The three women transform into Papillons for battle. The shroud burns off the mysterious woman and revels what appears to be Papillon Dahlia but she is clearly under Miki's control. The group runs from the powerful Dahlia and escape when they finally push her into the spa pool. Miki is reassigned to find a special stone which she does. Dahlia stalks the fleeing group and is approached by Rose. Dahlia runs Rose through with the cursed sword. This causes Dahlia to suddenly realize who she is and what she has done. She then calls out to Rose in horror.
| 6 | "Akiba is on Fire"; Transliteration: "Akiba wa moete iru" (Japanese: アキバは燃えている) | March 16, 2006 |
The scene begins with Rose telling Dahlia that she is glad that she is back and will remove the sword. Rose breaks the spell and removes the cursed sword Kusanagi from Dahlia's hand and collapses. Dahlia then lends her "power of the orb" to save Rose. Meanwhile the Dark sisters land and retrieve the stone and begin the start up sequence. Smith and a badly wounded Torakage meet up with the otaku and Papillons but Dark sisters Sue and Miki also meet them, battle and are eventually defeated. Torakage uses his power on Rose and they reunite but it is too much for Torakage and he dies afterward. Meanwhile Dark Empress Ran uses the stone to lift the entire Akiba neighborhood into space. This action is disrupted by the "forgotten ones" combining into an extremely large multi-headed monster. Rose and the Papillons break the spell and decompose the monster back into small harmless animals. The Dark sisters are then taken into custody by the Venusian woman and the interplanetary police for violating non planetary non-interference laws. Upon leaving Sue shows her appreciation by giving Lily her helmet saying that it has the power to revive. Sue's helmet is placed on Torakage's head, bringing him back to life.

The runtime for the TV episodes is approximately 24 minutes.

=== TV series opening and closing animation, incidental music ===
The opening and closing animation for the TV series is changed from the OVA. The opening animation features Tsubomi and the others working at the cafe as well as them transitioning to and performing in their Papillon forms. The ending animation is a still picture with painting over the figures of the Dark sisters in repose. The three are also shown as stop-action cartoon figures in at the sides of the frame. Also included in the animation are three live female cosplay characters in Papillon costumes posing stop-action in the lower right corner of the frame.

Incidental and background music for the TV series is provided by Masaya Koike (4-Ever).

== Opening and ending animation music ==
The OVA and TV series use the same music for the opening and ending animation and credits in the North American releases. The TV series used different music for the TV series in Japan but was changed for the North American releases for copyright reasons.

- Opening Theme "Rosetta" with vocals by Yuki Masuda.
- Ending Theme "Memories" with vocals by Asae Sakuraga
- New Season Opening Theme "Hikari No Kizuna" with vocals by Kaoru Kido.
- New Season Ending Theme "SUSANNO san shimai ai no TEEMA" with vocals by Chiharu Minami, Hiromi Tsunakake and Umeka Shouji

== See also ==
- List of Papillon Rose characters
