= Switch Girl!! =

Japanese manga series

- Cover of the first volume of Switch Girl!!

スイッチガール!! (Suitchi Gāru!!)
- Genre: Comedy
- Manga
- Written by: Natsumi Aida
- Published by: Shueisha
- English publisher: Shueisha (digital)
- Imprint: Margaret Comics
- Magazine: Margaret
- Original run: 19 August 2006 – 4 January 2014
- Volumes: 25
- Television drama
- Directed by: Hiroki Hayama; Kazuhiro Kobayashi
- Written by: Keisuke Uyama
- Music by: Mayuko; Kenichiro Suehiro
- Licensed by: AsianCrush
- Original network: Fuji TV Two
- Original run: 24 December 2011 – 18 February 2012
- Episodes: 8
- Television drama

Switch Girl!! 2
- Directed by: Kazuhiro Kobayashi
- Written by: Kouta Ooura
- Music by: Yūmao; Mayuko; Kenichiro Suehiro
- Original network: Fuji TV Two
- Original run: 7 December 2012 – 25 January 2013
- Episodes: 8

Switch Girl!! (Japanese: スイッチガール!!, Hepburn: Suitchi Gāru!!) is a Japanese manga series by Natsumi Aida. Switch Girl!! was serialized in the monthly shōjo manga magazine Margaret from 19 August 2006 to 4 January 2014. A live-action television drama adaptation ran on Fuji TV Two from 24 December 2011 and 18 February 2012, with a second season broadcast from 7 December 2012 to 25 January 2013.

== Plot ==
Nika Tamiya, the most popular girl at her high school, is a "switch girl". In public, Nika is in her "on" mode, where she is as a put-together, charismatic, and fashionable girl. However, in private, she is in her "off" mode, where she is unorganized, unfeminine, and lazy. One day, Arata Kamiyama transfers into her class and moves into her apartment building. Not only does Arata discover Nika's secret, but he also has "on" and "off" modes, where his "off" mode reveals he is secretly handsome. As Nika urges Arata to keep her "off" mode a secret, the two begin to learn more about each other and fall in love.

== Characters ==
Nika Tamiya (田宮 仁香, Tamiya Nika)
Voiced by: Yū Asakawa; played by: Mariya Nishiuchi
Nika is a high school student who describes herself as a "switch girl" with an "on" and "off" mode. Her "on" mode is her perfectly cultivated public image, while her "off" mode reveals she is lazy and unfashionable. Due to her popularity at school, she struggles to keep her "off" mode a secret.
Arata Kamiyama (神山 新, Kamiyama Arata)
Voiced by: Hikaru Midorikawa; played by: Renn Kiriyama
Arata is a transfer student in Nika's class who moves into her apartment building, and, like Nika, he has an "on" and "off" mode. His "on" mode has him wear glasses and appear inconspicuously, while his "off" mode reveals he is handsome and attractive. Arata's "on" mode is to avoid attracting unwanted attention.

== Media ==
=== Manga ===
A vomic (voice comic) adaptation of the first chapter was released in 2009. The manga chapters began publishing in English on Shueisha's Manga Million digital platform in 2026.

No.	Japanese release date	Japanese ISBN
1	25 January 2007	978-4-08-846132-8
2	25 May 2007	978-4-08-846171-7
3	25 September 2007	978-4-08-846210-3
4	25 December 2007	978-4-08-846243-1
5	25 April 2008	978-4-08-846286-8
6	25 August 2008	978-4-08-846323-0
7	25 November 2008	978-4-08-846354-4
8	25 February 2009	978-4-08-846384-1
9	25 June 2009	978-4-08-846418-3
10	23 October 2009	978-4-08-846455-8
11	25 February 2010	978-4-08-846494-7
12	25 May 2010	978-4-08-846525-8
13	24 September 2010	978-4-08-846565-4
14	3 December 2010	978-4-08-846604-0
15	25 March 2011	978-4-08-846629-3
16	20 April 2011	978-4-08-846639-2
17	23 September 2011	978-4-08-846697-2
18	25 January 2012	978-4-08-846735-1
19	25 May 2012	978-4-08-846774-0
20	25 October 2012	978-4-08-846840-2
21	25 January 2013	978-4-08-846876-1
22	24 May 2013	978-4-08-845041-4
23	25 September 2013	978-4-08-845094-0
24	24 January 2014	978-4-08-845156-5
25	25 February 2014	978-4-08-845166-4

=== Television drama ===
Switch Girl!! was adapted into a Japanese television drama, which was broadcast on Fuji TV Two from 24 December 2011 to 18 February 2012. It stars Mariya Nishiuchi as Nika and Renn Kiriyama as Arata. The theme song for the drama is "Love Brick" by Nana Mizuki.

A second season titled Switch Girl!! 2 aired on Fuji TV Two from 7 December 2012 to 25 January 2013. The theme song is "Happy Go Round" by Nana Mizuki.

Part of the first season was screened at Japan Expo 2012 in Paris to promote the home release for regional French audiences. Mariya Nishiuchi, who stars as Nika, appeared as a guest during the event. In 2020, AsianCrush acquired the English distribution rights for the first season.

==== Season 1 (2011) ====
No. overall	No. in season	Title	Original release date
1	1	"The Switch Girl Appears!"; Transliteration: "Suicchi Gāru Tōjō!!" (Japanese: スイッチガール登場!!)	24 December 2011
2	2	"A Group Date is Life-or-Death for High School Girls!!"; Transliteration: "Gōkon JK Zettai Zetsumei!!" (Japanese: 合コンJK絶体絶命!!)	7 January 2012
3	3	"My First Experience in His Room!!"; Transliteration: "Hajimete no Kare Heya Keiken!!" (Japanese: はじめてのカレ部屋体験!!)	14 January 2012
4	4	"The Bra Photos Leak!!"; Transliteration: "Burajā Shashin Ryūshutsu!!" (Japanese: ブラジャー写真流出!!)	21 January 2012
5	5	"Don't Have H With Other Girls!!"; Transliteration: "Hoka no Onna to H Suru na!!" (Japanese: ほかの女とHするな!!)	28 January 2012
6	6	"A Shocking Experience at Akihabara!!"; Transliteration: "Shōgeki no Akiba Keiken!!" (Japanese: 衝撃のアキバ体験!!)	4 February 2012
7	7	"No! Teacher... Stop it!!" Transliteration: "Dame! Sensei... Yamete!!" (Japanese: ダメ! 先生。。。やめて!!)	11 February 2012
8	8	"The Final Episode... I'll Fall in Love with You!!"; Transliteration: "Saishūkai... Anata to Koi o Suru!!" (Japanese: 最終回。。。あなたと恋をする!!)	18 February 2012

==== Season 2: Switch Girl!! 2 (2012) ====
No. overall	No. in season	Title	Original release date
9	1	"A Shock! A Woman's Territory: Switch Girl Returns"; Transliteration: "Shōgeki! Joshi no Seitei: Suicchi Gāru Ritānzu" (Japanese: 衝撃! 女子の生態～スイッチガールズリターンズ)	7 December 2012
10	2	"A Formidable Opponent! The Heinous Switch Girl Appears"; Transliteration: "Kyōteki! Gokuaku Suicchi Gāru Tōjō" (Japanese: 強敵! 極悪スイッチガール登場)	14 December 2012
11	3	"The Ultimate! A Hottie & Beautiful Girl's Strategy"; Transliteration: "Kyūkyoku! Ikemen & Bishōjo Sakusen" (Japanese: 究極！イケメン&美少女作戦)	21 December 2012
12	4	"The Fear! A Dark Gathering: Shibuya Arc Part 1"; Transliteration: "Kyōfu! Kuroi Shūdan Shibuya-hen: Zenpen" (Japanese: 恐怖! 黒い集団 渋谷編・前編)	28 December 2012
13	5	"The Crisis! The Confinement of Girls: Shibuya Arc Part 2"; Transliteration: "Kiki! Shōjo Kankin: Shibuya-hen:Kōhen" (Japanese: 危機! 少女監禁 渋谷編・後編)	4 January 2013
14	6	"A Burst of Laughter! The Dream Couple's Hot Springs Trip"; Transliteration: "Bakushō! Yume no Kappuru Onsen Ryokō" (Japanese: 爆笑! 夢のカップル温泉旅行)	11 January 2013
15	7	"The Temptation! The Mixed Gender Bath's Trap"; Transliteration: "Nōsatsu! Konyoku Onsen no Wana" (Japanese: 悩殺! 混浴温泉のワナ)	18 January 2013
16	8	"The Crying Sounds! I Love You So Much That I Can't Handle It"; Transliteration: "Gōkyū! Suki de Suki de Tamaranai" (Japanese: 号泣! 好きで好きでたまらない)	25 January 2013

== Reception ==
Switch Girl!! ranked 42 in the list of top-selling manga in 2011 in Japan, with 1,095,914 copies. Renn Kiriyama won the People's Choice Award for Most Popular Actor at the Seoul International Drama Awards for his portrayal of Arata in the second season of the live-action drama adaptation.
