= Cutie Honey Flash =

Japanese anime television series

- Japanese: キューティーハニー F(フラッシュ)
- Revised Hepburn: Kyūtī Hanī Furasshu
- Type: Anime television series
- Genre: Magical girl
- Based on: Cutie Honey by Go Nagai
- Directed by: Noriyo Sasaki
- Series composition: Ryōta Yamaguchi
- Character designer: Miho Shimogasa
- Music by: Toshihiko Sahashi
- Country of origin: Japan
- Original language: Japanese
- No. of episodes: 39

Production
- Editor: Yasuhiro Yoshikawa
- Producers: Megumi Ueda (TV Asahi); Kenji Ōta (TV Asahi); Kōichi Yada (Toei Advertising); Iriya Azuma
- Production companies: TV Asahi; Toei Advertising; Toei Animation

Original release
- Network: ANN (TV Asahi)
- Release: February 15, 1997 – January 31, 1998

Related
- Manga
- Written by: Yukako Iisaka
- Published by: Shogakukan
- Magazine: Ciao
- Original run: May 26, 1997 – April 23, 1998
- Volumes: 4
- Anime film
- Directed by: Noriyo Sasaki
- Written by: Ryōta Yamaguchi
- Music by: Toshihiko Sahashi
- Studio: Toei Animation
- Released: July 12, 1997
- Runtime: 38 minutes

Cutie Honey Flash (Note: Japanese: キューティーハニー F(フラッシュ), Hepburn: Kyūtī Hanī Furasshu; also known as Cutie Honey F, Cutey Honey Flash, and Cutey Honey F) is a Japanese anime television series based on the Cutie Honey manga series by Go Nagai. Directed by Noriyo Sasaki at Toei Animation, written by Ryōta Yamaguchi, character designed by Miho Shimogasa and music composed by Toshihiko Sahashi, Flash is the third anime adaptation of the manga following the 1973 anime series and its 1994 original video animation sequel, New Cutie Honey. The series follows similar plot from the predecessors; A high school student named Honey Kisaragi transforms into Cutie Honey to save her father, Dr. Kisaragi from a villanous Panther Claw. Flash aired on TV Asahi from February 15, 1997 to January 31, 1998.

Flash employed majority of its animation staff from Sailor Moon Sailor Stars, a fifth and final season of the Sailor Moon anime series, as well as utilizing similar art style and aiming for same demographic as it took over latter's timelot. A manga adaptation by Yukako Iisaka was published in Shogakukan's Ciao magazine from May 26, 1997 to April 23, 1998. A short film based on the series was released in Japan on July 12, 1997.

== Plot ==
Honey Kisaragi is a 16-year-old perfectly normal, beautiful high school student attending the unisex Saint Chapel Academy... until her scientist father is kidnapped by the evil organization Panther Claw, that is. However, her father left behind a device that she can use to transform into the pinkish red-haired sword-wielding heroine, Cutie Honey. Aided by Seiji Hayami, a private eye who specializes in Panther Claw, and the mysterious "Twilight Prince" known as Zera, she fights members of Panther Claw in order to rescue her father.

== Characters ==
Like New Cutie Honey before it, Cutie Honey Flash makes references to other series from Cutie Honey creator Go Nagai. Recurring Honey characters Honey Kisaragi, Seiji, Danbei, Natsuko, Panther Zora, Sister Jill, and Miharu made a return, along with Alphonne, Principal Pochi (as a poodle).

=== Main characters ===

The protagonist of the series, as with other Cutie Honey media, is Honey Kisaragi. However, unlike other Cutie Honey incarnations, Honey is not an android but possesses a fully functional human body including reproductive capabilities. Consequently, she is indeed a 16-year-old girl at the beginning of the series, not a robot posing as one. Honey studies at the boarding school, St. Chapel Academy (which has both girls and boys attending the school instead of being a girls only school like in previous installments), along with best friend Natsuko Aki (who is nicknamed "Nat-chan") from the original 1970s version of Honey. The academy's faculty includes former Honey characters as well: here, Miharu returns as a dreaded school teacher, while Danbei Hayami is the academy's director. Later in the series, Alphonne, also from the original Cutie Honey, appears as Danbei's older sister.

Honey receives help, advice, and white flowers from a mysterious "Twilight Prince" (Tasogare no Prince). Among the things the prince gives Honey are objects invented by her father, the scientist Takeshi Kisaragi. Honey can use the Atmospheric Element Condenser by pressing her choker and saying the phrase "Honey Flash", to transform in various ways and can heal from otherwise grievous wounds in a matter of hours. Much like the original version, she possesses the Honey Boomerang and Honey Fleuret as her weapons. Honey can transform into a variety of personas in this series; she can change into versions of Hurricane Honey and Cutie Honey from the 1970s versions, as well as these:

- Hurricane Honey (biker). A woman who rides her motorcycle like the wind. The theme color is red.
- Scoop Honey (paparazzi). A woman who is ready with her film and camera acting as a reporter. The theme color is orange.
- Stage Honey (singer). A woman who has her microphone and her formal dress ready for an audience. The theme color is purple.
- Nurse Honey (nurse). A woman who knows medical needs. The theme color is blue.
- Elegance Honey (bride). A woman who wears a white wedding dress. She uses a bouquet when she's in danger. The theme color is gold.
- Escort Honey (tour guide). A woman disguised as a flight attendant. The theme color is green.
- Hyper Honey (heroine). The hearts of Honey and Seira combine to take this form, resembling Cutie Honey but with a different outfit and far more powerful. Her theme color is rainbow.

Later in the series it is revealed that Honey and Seira were two survivors of a series of artificially created humans that were created to possess the Atmospheric Element Condenser created by her father and Prince Zera under Panther Claw before Sister Jill personally terminated the project. After the destruction of the incubation machine, Dr. Kisaragi found and raised Honey as his own while Seira was taken in by Prince Zera and Panther Zora.

According to episode 11, her birth date is February 8, 1981. Her blood type is AB. Her theme color is pink, also her theme color is yellow.

=== Panther Claw ===
In Cutie Honey Flash, Honey must deal with a version of the Panther Claw organization, composed of Panther Zora, an ancient primordial evil in the form of a stone figure that reigns over the group; Sister Jill, who is Zora's second-in-command; Prince Zera, a Panther Claw leader who jealously seeks Sister Jill's position in the group; and various henchmen. When fighting enemies, Cutie Honey uses attacks such as the Honey Boomerang, Honey Lightning Flare, Honey Rouge Arrow, and Honey Virginal Invitation. In this series, they were called Mother and Daughter, instead of Sisters.

A fourth character from the original Honey series, Seiji Hayami, appears as a detective whose father was killed by the Panther Claw. Seiji often meets Honey in her Cutie Honey form, not knowing that she is Kisaragi.

=== Misty Honey ===

The fourteenth episode of the anime introduces Misty Honey, as an original character and a major antagonist, an anti-hero, a rival and self-proclaimed twin sister of Cutie Honey, whose name was chosen through a contest in Japan. Misty Honey, unlike Cutie Honey, cannot turn into anyone she wants; she can only change to Misty Honey. She has a band around her thigh that resembles Honey's choker which acts as the activator for her Atmospheric Element Condenser but she uses a ring to transform with the words "Honey Flash". Seira's heart was "poisoned" by Panther Zora when she was found by Twilight Prince. The darkness in her heart (and her flawed transformation device) creates Panther Claw minions. Later in the series, it is revealed that Honey and Seira were two survivors of a series of artificially created humans that were created to possess the Atmospheric Element Condenser created by her father and Prince Zera under Panther Claw before Dr. Kisaragi personally terminated the project. After the destruction of the incubation machine, Dr. Kisaragi found and raised Honey as his own while Seira was taken in by Prince Zera and Panther Zora. Her alter ego, Seira Hazuki, shares her given name with Seiji and Honey's child, who appears only in the 39th and final episode.

She can be seen as a negative version of Cutie, since Misty Honey has long blue hair and a more revealing outfit, while Cutie has short pink hair and a less revealing outfit. While the anime and manga versions of the characters of Cutie Honey Flash mostly look similar, the two versions of Hazuki differ greatly in appearance. Misty Honey's attacks include Honey Sexy Dynamite. Seira's family name "Hazuki" is the classical/romantic Japanese name for the eighth month of the lunar calendar. In contrast, Honey's family name "Kisaragi" is the classical/romantic Japanese name for the second month of the lunar calendar. "Kisaragi" corresponds to March/April (Spring), while "Hazuki" corresponds to September/October (Autumn) of the solar calendar, representing the opposing characteristics of the twin sisters. Her theme color is blue.

== Production ==
Cutie Honey Flash uses hand-drawn cel animation; according to Shimogasa, the use of computer-animated characters on hand-painted backgrounds was planned and tested, but later rejected. This is the final television series produced by Toei Animation to utilize cel animation; all television series produced by the company then after would use digital ink-and-paint. Its theme music was performed by Salia.

== Media ==
=== Episodes ===
==== Part 1 ====
No.	Title	Original release date
1	"In the Name of Love! A Maiden Transforms"; Transliteration: "Ai no tame ni! Otome wa kawaru" (愛のために! 乙女は変わる)	February 15, 1997
After her father is kidnapped by Panther Claw, 16 year old Honey Kisaragi is given the power to transform into Cutey Honey.
2	"The Maiden's Determination! The Single Flower in The Twilight"; Transliteration: "Otome no ketsui! Tasogare ni ichirin no hana" (Japanese: 乙女の決意! たそがれに一輪の花)	February 22, 1997
Honey believes her father is still alive and is determined to find him. Panther Zora wants a valuable necklace.
3	"A Maiden's Dream! For Whom Is The Wedding Dress?"; Transliteration: "Otome no yume! Hanayome ishō wa dare no tame?" (Japanese: 乙女の夢! 花嫁衣装は誰のため?)	March 1, 1997
Honey must stop Panther Claw from stealing three designer wedding dresses.
4	"Tears Of The Little Mermaid! The Bond Between Father and Daughter"; Transliteration: "Ningyo hime no namida! Chichitoko no kizuna" (Japanese: 人魚姫の涙! 父と娘のきずな)	March 8, 1997
Pop singer Arina is targeted by Panther Claw, who want her priceless earrings.
5	"Overcome Your Fate! The Rainbow-Colored Girl"; Transliteration: "Sadame o koete! Nanairo no niji no otome" (Japanese: 運命をこえて! 七色の虹の乙女)	March 15, 1997
Panther Claw wants a fortune teller's doll.
6	"Unable to Transform! Honey Is Trapped"; Transliteration: "Henshin funō! Tojikome rareta Hanī" (変身不能! 閉じこめられたハニー)	March 22, 1997
Honey is trapped with her friends and unable to transform.
7	"The Sea of Sorrow! Seiji's Recollection of His Father"; Transliteration: "Kanashimi no umi! Seiji, chichi e no tsuioku" (悲しみの海! 青児、父への追憶)	April 19, 1997
Seiji reminiscences on the death of his father. Honey meets Sister Jill.
8	"The Sweet and Perilous Scent! Protect A Maiden's Pure Heart"; Transliteration: "Amaku kiken'na kaori! Mamore otome no junjō" (甘く危険な香り! 守れ乙女の純情)	April 26, 1997
Natsuko and Honey meet a young man who becomes Panther Claw's next target.
9	"The Prince Is In Danger?! A Rival Appears!!"; Transliteration: "Purinsu no kiki!? Raibaru tōjō!!" (Japanese: プリンスの危機!? ライバル登場!!)	May 3, 1997
Honey gets jealous when Prince gets close to a rich girl named Erica.
10	"The Finishing Move Fails?! Honey's Desperate Battle"; Transliteration: "Hisawaza yabureru!? Hanī kesshi no gekitō" (必殺技敗れる!? ハニー決死の激闘)	May 10, 1997
Honey is blinded by Panther Claw's latest emissary, Fantastic Butterfly.
11	"The Creeping Terror!! Honey Is The Target"; Transliteration: "Shinobi yoru kyōfu!! Nerawareta Hanī" (Japanese: 忍びよる恐怖!! 狙われたハニー)	May 17, 1997
Teenage girls with the surname "Kisaragi" fall victim to Panther Claw. Panther Claw believes they've discovered the whereabouts of the Atmospheric Element Condenser.
12	"Honey in Peril! Jill's Electric Storm"; Transliteration: "Hanī zettai zetsumei! Jiru dengeki no arashi" (ハニー絶体絶命! ジル電撃の嵐)	May 24, 1997
Seiji finds Dr. Kisaragi but he has amnesia. Sister Jill and Honey battle.
13	"Fight With The Power of Love! The Final Battle With Jill"; Transliteration: "Ai no chikara de tatakae! Jiru to no saishū kessen" (愛の力で戦え! ジルとの最終決戦)	May 31, 1997
Honey goes to Sister Jill's fortress to rescue her father. Seiji joins the fight.

==== Part 2 ====
No.	Title	Original release date
14	"The Entrance of a Mysterious Warrior! Prelude to A New Destiny"; Transliteration: "Nazo no senshi tōjō! Aratana unmei no jokyoku" (Japanese: 謎の戦士登場!! 新たな運命の序曲)	June 7, 1997
Honey meets the new transfer student, Seira Hazuki. Panther Claw returns to St. Chapel Academy.
15	"The Act Begins! The Great Battle Between Two Honeys"; Transliteration: "Kaimaku no beru! Futari no Hanī chō sentō" (Japanese: 開幕のベル! 二人のハニー超戦闘)	June 14, 1997
Honey struggles after she discovers Seira is her younger twin sister.
16	"The Entanglement of Love and Hate! The Sisters' Tennis Match"; Transliteration: "Karami au aizō! Shimai tenisu taiketsu" (Japanese: からみ合う愛憎! 姉妹テニス対決)	June 21, 1997
Seira and Honey engage in an intense tennis match. Seiji sees Misty Honey and Cutey Honey battle.
17	"The Shocking Truth! Father Reveals Honey's Secret"; Transliteration: "Shōgeki jijitsu! Chichi ga kataru Hanī no himitsu" (Japanese: 衝撃事実! 父が語るハニーの秘密)	July 5, 1997
Honey is reunited with her father at Sea World. He reveals his connection with Panther Claw.
18	"Scorching Memories! Seira's Past"; Transliteration: "Moeru honō no kioku! Seira no kako" (Japanese: 燃える炎の記憶! 聖羅の過去)	July 12, 1997
Seira's hostility and bitterness towards Honey increases. Sunset Claw attacks Danbei and Natsuko.
19	"Swimsuit Contest! Exterminating Skeletons On A Ghost Ship"; Transliteration: "Mizugi de shōbu! Yūreisei no gai-kotsu taiji" (Japanese: 水着で勝負! 幽霊船のガイ骨退治)	July 26, 1997
Seira and Honey team up against a ghastly Panther Claw soldier. Seira has doubts about Panther Claw.
20	"Seal Of The Panther! Secret in Seira's Bosom"; Transliteration: "Pansā no kokuin! Seira no mune no himitsu" (Japanese: パンサー刻印! 聖羅の胸の秘密)	August 2, 1997
Seira receives a love letter at school. Honey goes up against Prince Zera.
21	"For Love! The Last Battle between The Double Honey's"; Transliteration: "Ai yue ni! Dabūru Hanī saigo no tatakai" (Japanese: 愛ゆえに! Wハニー最後の戦い)	August 16, 1997
Seiji is kidnapped by Misty Honey. The two sisters have their final battle.
22	"Seira Perishes In The Flames! Father's Love In Her Heart"; Transliteration: "Honō no naka ni Seira shisu! Chichi no ai o mune ni" (Japanese: 炎の中に聖羅死す! 父の愛を胸に)	August 23, 1997
Prince Zera reveals the truth about the two sisters. Seira finally faces the bitterness in her heart, which manifests into Dark Panther.
23	"The Finale of Love! Honey's Love That Outshines Destiny"; Transliteration: "Ai no ketsumatsu! Unmei ni katsu Hanī no hikari" (Japanese: 愛の結末! 運命に勝つハニーの光)	August 30, 1997
Honey battles against Prince Zera for the sake of her twin sister and her father's death. She receives a whole new power.

==== Part 3 ====
No.	Title	Original release date
24	"The Academy Is Collapsing?! Threat of The New Panther Army"; Transliteration: "Gakuen hōkai!? Shin Pansā gundan no kyōi" (Japanese: 学園崩壊!? 新パンサー軍団の脅威)	September 13, 1997
A revived Sister Jill and her comrades attack St. Chapel Academy. At last, Honey transforms in front of her friends.
25	"Maternal Honey?! The Targeted Baby"; Transliteration: "Hanī no kosodate!? Nerawareta bebī" (Japanese: ハニーの子育て!? 狙われたベビー)	October 4, 1997
Honey finds a mysterious little creature.
26	"An "Idol" Panther? The Enthusiastic Singing Match"; Transliteration: "Aidoru na Pansā? Nesshō utagassen" (Japanese: アイドルなパンサー? 熱唱歌合戦)	October 11, 1997
Honey faces off against the singing American star, Electric Panther.
27	"The Queen Of The Circuit! A Battle in Turbo Speed"; Transliteration: "Sākitto no joō! Chō kōsoku no gekitō" (Japanese: サーキットの女王! 超高速の激闘)	October 25, 1997
Honey and the gang must face against Panther Claw at a racetrack.
28	"Her Name Is The "Devil"! Tears of The Panther Warrior"; Transliteration: "Sononaha akuma! Pansā senshi no namida" (Japanese: その名は悪魔! パンサー戦士の涙)	November 1, 1997
Scud Panther reveals her tragic backstory to Honey.
29	"Great Adventure Of The Deserted Island! Much Ado About A Treasure Hunt"; Transliteration: "Mujintō dai bōken! O takarasagashi de ōsawagi" (Japanese: 無人島大冒険! お宝探しで大騒ぎ)	November 15, 1997
Danbei and the others pursue a treasure map. Jungle Panther and Amazon Panther follow.
30	"There's No Escape?! The Runaway Train Speeding Towards Hell"; Transliteration: "Dasshutsu fukanō!? Jigoku-iki no bōsō ressha" (Japanese: 脱出不可能!? 地獄行きの暴走列車)	November 22, 1997
Honey and her friends end up on Panther Claw's deadliest trap yet.
31	"Passion and Love Persist! Days of Father's Youth"; Transliteration: "Jōnetsu to ai wa kiezu! Chichi no seishun no hi" (Japanese: 情熱と愛は消えず! 父の青春の日)	November 29, 1997
Honey meets her father's old colleague, Dr. Kanzaki. Meanwhile, Gorgon Claw kidnaps world famous scientists.
32	"The Starving Detective, Seiji Hayami! Worst Day Ever"; Transliteration: "Hara peko tantei, Hayami Seiji! Saiaku no ichinichi" (Japanese: 腹ペコ探偵早見青児! 最悪の一日)	December 6, 1997
Cupid Claw causes Seiji to fall in love with Ms. Miharu.
33	"The Trap in Outer Space! Honey's Biggest Crisis"; Transliteration: "Dai uchū no wana! Hanī saidai no kiki" (Japanese: 大宇宙のワナ! ハニー最大の危機)	December 13, 1997
Honey goes into space to battle Sister Jill. Freddy Claw moves in to take Jill's spot.
34	"Honey's Romantic Choice! Seiji Vs. The Prince"; Transliteration: "Hanī ai no sentaku! Seiji VS [to] Purinsu" (Japanese: ハニー愛の選択! 青児VS[と]プリンス)	December 20, 1997
Prince Zera returns, causing Seiji to become jealous.
35	"Believe In Me! The Power of Love At Full Maximum"; Transliteration: "Watashi o shinjite! Ai no hikari zen pawā kaihō" (Japanese: 私を信じて! 愛の光全パワー開放)	December 27, 1997
Honey and Seiji go to battle against Freddy Claw. Honey displays the Atmospheric Element Condenser's fearsome power.
36	"Battle of Courage! The Electrifying Pro-Wrestling Match"; Transliteration: "Yūki no tatakai! Dengeki puroresu matchi" (Japanese: 勇気の戦い! 電撃プロレスマッチ)	January 10, 1998
Honey struggles with her transformations. Panther Zora finally makes her move.
37	"The Final Crusade! (Part One) Destiny Confronts Love"; Transliteration: "Saigo no seisen! (Zenpen) Unmei ni mukau ai" (Japanese: 最後の聖戦!（前編） 運命に向かう愛)	January 17, 1998
Honey and Seiji admit their feelings for each other. The final battle against Panther Claw begins.
38	"The Final Crusade! (Part Two) The Power to Dream Triumphs"; Transliteration: "Saigo no seisen! (Kōhen) Yume miru chikara no shōri" (Japanese: 最後の聖戦!（後編） 夢見る力の勝利)	January 24, 1998
Honey finally battles against Panther Zora. The truth behind Panther Claw is revealed. Honey uses her power to defeat Zora turning into Diamond Statue and the light comes to accompany her and Seiji.
39	"Honey The Bride! The Light of Love Is Forever"; Transliteration: "Hanayome Hanī! Ai no hikari wa eien ni" (Japanese: 花嫁ハニー! 愛の光は永遠に)	January 31, 1998
Three years have passed since Honey's victory over Panther Zora. Honey and Seiji prepare for their wedding, as Sister Jill returns for her revenge and kidnaps their daughter, Seira.
