= Mariya Nishiuchi =

Japanese former actress and model (born 1993)

- 西内 まりや
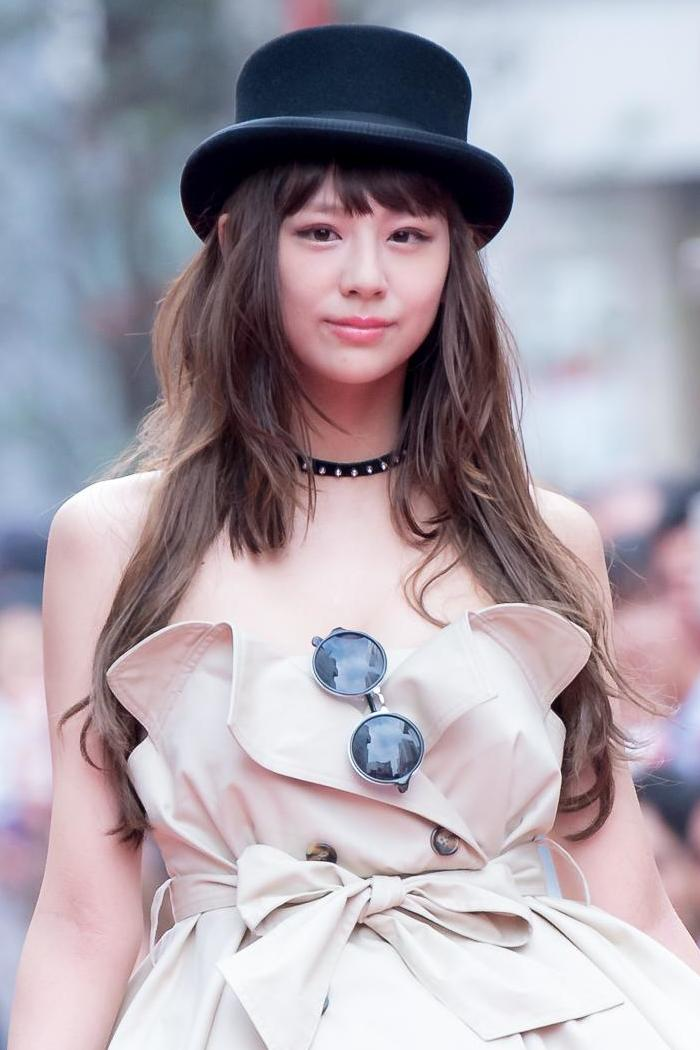
- Mariya Nishiuchi during the Shibuya Runway of the Shibuya Fashion Week in 2016
- Born: December 24, 1993 (age 32); Fukuoka, Japan
- Occupations: Model; actress; singer-songwriter
- Years active: 2008–2025
- Relatives: Hiromi Nishiuchi (sister)

Mariya Nishiuchi (西内 まりや, Nishiuchi Mariya; born December 24, 1993) is a retired Japanese model, actress, and singer-songwriter who was affiliated with Rising Production. She is the younger sister of model, actress, and BeForU member Hiromi Nishiuchi.

== Filmography ==
=== TV series ===
Year	Title	Role	Network	Notes	Ref.
2008	Seigi no Mikata	Tomoka Moriyama	NTV		
2008	Scrap Teacher	Mariya Ueno	NTV		
2011–13	Switch Girl!!	Nika Tamiya	Fuji TV	Main role; 26 episodes	
2012	Great Teacher Onizuka	Miki Katsuragi	Kansai		
2013	Yamada-kun and the Seven Witches	Urara Shiraishi	Fuji TV	Main role; 8 episodes	
2014	Smoking Gun	Sakurako Ishinomaki	Fuji TV		
2015	Hotel Concierge	Tōko Amano	TBS	Main role	
2015	Kabukimono Keiji	Sano Maeda	NHK		
2017	Totsuzen Desu ga, Ashita Kekkon Shimasu	Asuka Takanashi	Fuji TV	Main role	
2021	The Naked Director	Sayaka	Netflix	Season 2	

=== Films ===
Year	Title	Role	Notes	Ref.
2008	The Golden Compass	Lyra Belacqua	Main role, dubbing	
2012	One Piece Film: Z	Marin	Voice cast	
2015	World of Delight	Rika Hitomi	Main role	
2016	Cutie Honey: Tears	Cutie Honey	Main role	

== Discography ==
=== Singles ===
Title	Release date	Peak chart position
"Love Evolution"	August 20, 2014	19
"7 Wonders"	January 28, 2015	13
"Arigatō Forever..."	May 6, 2015	10
"Save Me"	October 28, 2015	16
"Chu Chu / Hello"	May 25, 2016	18
"Believe"	September 8, 2016	11
"Motion"	February 24, 2017	18

== Magazines ==
- Nicola, Shinchosha 1997-, as an exclusive model from 2007 to 2010
- Seventeen, Shueisha 1967-, as an exclusive model from 2010 to 2015

Preceded by Kōta Shinzato	Japan Record Award for Best New Artist; 2014	Succeeded by Magnolia Factory
