= List of Cutie Honey episodes =

Cutie Honey (Japanese: キューティーハニー, Hepburn: Kyūtī Hanī) is an anime series consisting of 25 episodes.

It was first aired on TV Asahi on 13 October 1973 and concluded on 30 March 1974.

No.	Title	Original release date
1	"The Black Claw Grips the Heart"; Transliteration: "Kuroi Tsume ga Hāto o Tsukamu" (Japanese: 黒い爪がハートを掴む)	October 13, 1973
After her father is murdered by Panther Claw, Honey Kisaragi discovers she is a transforming android equipped with the "Atmospheric Element Condenser", an invention that can materialize matter from air. Honey swears revenge on Panther Claw.
2	"Night of the Fire Peony, Dance of Swords"; Transliteration: "Yoru no Hi Botan Tsurugi no Mai" (Japanese: 夜の火牡丹 剣の舞い)	October 20, 1973
Seiji is sent to the hospital after getting injured from Sister Jill's attack. When Honey visits him at the hospital, she faces off against Fire Claw. Note: First appearance of Danbei Hayami.
3	"Traps Set By the Red Axe"; Transliteration: "Akai Ono ga Wana o Haru" (Japanese: 赤い斧が罠を張る)	October 27, 1973
A famous jeweler opens up a store in Japan and offers free jewels to customers. Honey and Seiji investigate, only to discover it is a trap set by Tomahawk Panther.
4	"I Saw the Devil in the Beautiful Forest"; Transliteration: "Utsukushī ga Mori ni Akuma o Mita" (Japanese: 美しケ森に悪魔を見た)	November 3, 1973
An entire art museum is ripped from the ground and taken away by Panther Claw. After Seiji is injured, Danbei teams up with Honey to fight Badfly Claw.
5	"The Crimson Sky is the Devil's Curse"; Transliteration: "Kurenai no Sora Wa Akuma no Noroi" (Japanese: 紅の空は悪魔の呪い)	November 10, 1973
Danbei and Honey pursue Taranche Panther, who has just stolen a valuable Egyptian crown.
6	"The Black Scissors Shred Dreams"; Transliteration: "Yume o Saku Kuroi Hasami" (Japanese: 夢を裂く黒い鋏)	November 17, 1973
The Princess of Toreador has been invited to the opening of a new theme park, Scissors Land, but it is really an elaborate plan set by Panther Claw to steal her precious "Queen Ring." It's up to Honey to stop their evil plan. Note: In the previous episode and in the episode credits, Scissors Claw was called "Scissors Panther."
7	"The Black Panther Sings The Dance of Death"; Transliteration: "Kurohyō ga Utau Shi no Odori" (Japanese: 黒豹が唄う死の踊り)	November 24, 1973
Seiji enlists Honey's help after a mysterious black panther steals a golden Buddha statue.
8	"The Devil Beckons From the Deep Blue Sea"; Transliteration: "Akuma ga Yobu Aoi Kaitei" (Japanese: 悪魔が呼ぶ蒼い海底)	December 1, 1973
Honey allows herself to be captured by Octo Panther so she can discover Panther Claw's base. The Hayami family go after her.
9	"Extinguish the Devil's Whistle"; Transliteration: "Akuma no Kuchibue o Kese" (Japanese: 悪魔の口笛を消せ)	December 8, 1973
Honey and the Hayami family investigates a series of bird attacks in the city. Meanwhile, Panther Claw has kidnapped Ms. Alphonne and Ms. Hystler. Note: Panther Claw finds out about Honey's teachers.
10	"The Castle of Illusion Smothered in Fog"; Transliteration: "Kiri ni Musebu Maboroshi no Shiro" (Japanese: 霧にむせぶ幻の城)	December 15, 1973
A fortune teller tells Junpei only Honey can save him from impending doom. Honey and Natsuko notice an eerie red star in the sky.
11	"Keep Your Hands Off the Gold"; Transliteration: "Ōgon ni Te wo Dasuna" (Japanese: 黄金に手を出すな)	December 22, 1973
A ghost disrupts a gold rush in Hakone. Honey and her principal are captured by Breast Claw. Note: First appearance of Principal Pochi. Alphonne claims this is her first time driving but was seen driving a buggy in episode 9.
12	"A Red Pearl is Forever"; Transliteration: "Akai Shinju wa Eien Ni" (Japanese: 赤い真珠は永遠に)	December 29, 1973
While modeling the famous red pearl, "The Mermaid's Tear", Honey is attacked by Sea Panther. Honey discovers the tragic connection between Sea Panther and the red pearl. Note: This episode was later featured in the Spring 1974 Toei Manga Matsuri.
13	"Tears Fall into the Valley Depths"; Transliteration: "Namida wa Taniai no Okubukaiku" (Japanese: 涙は谷間の奥深く)	January 5, 1974
Honey and the Hayami family are attacked by Blade Panther and her minions during a trip to the hot springs. Honey is forced to transform in front of Danbei and Junpei. A Panther Claw discovers the secret of Honey's necklace. Note: The entire Hayami family now knows Honey's true identity.
14	"Ah, The Last Day of School"; Transliteration: "Aa Gakuen Saigo no hi" (Japanese: ああ学園最後の日)	January 12, 1974
Sister Jill and Dynamite Claw infiltrate St. Chapel Academy. Jill attacks Honey's best friend, Natsuko. Note: Last appearance of Saint Chapel Academy and Natsuko. Sister Jill and Honey finally meet.
15	"Looking Back with Tears of Rage"; Transliteration: "Ikari no Namida de Burikaere" (Japanese: 怒りの涙で振り返れ)	January 19, 1974
Honey's teachers try to raise funds to rebuild the school but are severely injured by Panther Claw. Junpei takes a photo of Sister Jill. Note: Panther Zora is referred to as "Sister Zora". Despite the fact Alphonne wasn't present for the destruction of St. Chapel Academy, she has flashbacks about it.
16	"From the Casino with Love"; Transliteration: "Kashino Yori Ai o Komete" (Japanese: カジノより愛をこめて)	January 26, 1974
Honey, Seiji, and Danbei head to the Kingdom of Manaco to investigate a hijacking. The King of Manaco falls in love with Fancy Honey. Note: Last appearance of Mami. First appearance of Honey's Cessna.
17	"The Storm Vanishes in the Far North"; Transliteration: "Kita no Hatte ni Arashi wa Kiete" (Japanese: 北の果てに嵐は消えて)	February 2, 1974
Seiji is brainwashed by Aurora Panther and steals Honey's necklace. Sister Jill discovers the truth behind the Atmospheric Element Condenser.
18	"Hot Blood Boiling Over"; Transliteration: "Moeagaru Akai Chishio" (Japanese: 燃え上がる熱い血潮)	February 9, 1974
Honey and the Hayami family end up on a deserted island which is actually a trap set by Panther Zora and Coral Claw.
19	"Flowers Bloom in a Far-Off Desert"; Transliteration: "Harukanaru Koya ni Saku Hana" (Japanese: 遥かなる荒野に咲く花)	February 16, 1974
In Monument Valley, a sheriff and his girlfriend are ambushed during a UFO sighting. Honey and the Hayami family go to investigate but are confronted by Puman Claw.
20	"The Forgotten Legendary City"; Transliteration: "Ushinawareta Kasetsu No Miyako" (Japanese: 失われた伝説の都)	February 23, 1974
Honey and the Hayami family travel to a remote island in search of the lost treasure of Mu. Unfortunately, they are ambushed by Crocodile Claw. Note: Last appearance of Honey's Cessna.
21	"A Black Shadow Stands in the Green Field"; Transliteration: "Midori no Ya ni Tatsu Kuroi Kage" (Japanese: 緑の野に立つ黒い影)	March 2, 1974
Honey, Seiji, Miharu, and Pochi compete in the Mt. Fuji rally. Sister Jill rigs the competition with the help of Twin Panther.
22	"My Beloved Paradise School"; Transliteration: "Akogare no Paradaisu Gakuen" (Japanese: あこがれのパラダイス学園)	March 9, 1974
Danbei encourages Honey to enroll at Paradise Academy, a prestigious co-ed school that his sweet nephew attends. Honey is mortified to discover the school is completely rundown and Danbei's nephew is actually the gang leader. Meanwhile, Sister Jill's assassin, Great Claw attacks. Note: First appearance of Paradise Academy, Naojiro Hayami, Mr. Goemon, and the Principal of Paradise Academy.
23	"The Bewitching Scorpio Woman"; Transliteration: "Ayashiki Sasoriza no Onna" (Japanese: 妖しきサソリ座の女)	March 16, 1974
Honey proposes a recreational day at Paradise Academy. Seiji worries about Honey attending a school full of boys and decides to do an exposé. Scorpion Panther makes her move. Note: Seiji now works for a newspaper called "The Modern Times".
24	"Elegy of the Proud Challenger"; Transliteration: "Hokori Takaki Chosensha no Uta" (Japanese: 誇り高き挑戦者の詩)	March 23, 1974
Panther Claw's greatest warrior, Drill Claw, is excited to battle Honey. Sister Jill kidnaps Danbei, Junpei and Naojiro. Note: Seiji now works as the Japanese teacher for Paradise Academy. Female students are attending Paradise Academy again.
25	"A Poison Flower Falls to Hell"; Transliteration: "Jigoku ni Chitta Doku no Hana" (Japanese: 地獄に散った毒の花)	March 30, 1974
Eagle Panther attacks Honey and her friends during a school excursion. Sister Jill beckons Honey to her fortress for a final battle. Honey uses the full power of the Atmospheric Element Condenser.
