= New Cutie Honey =

1994 original video animation anime series

- Cover art of North American "Essential Anime" release by ADV Films, 2004

新・キューティーハニー (Shin Kyūtī Hanī)
- Genre: Magical girl
- Created by: Go Nagai
- Original video animation
- Directed by: Yasuchika Nagaoka
- Music by: Kazuhiko Toyama
- Studio: Studio Junio; Ashi Productions (#3); Trans Arts (#7-8)
- Licensed by: AUS: Madman Entertainment; NA: Discotek Media; UK: ADV Films UK
- Released: April 21, 1994 – November 21, 1995
- Runtime: 25 minutes
- Episodes: 8

New Cutie Honey (Japanese: 新・キューティーハニー, Hepburn: Shin Kyūtī Hanī; also known as New Super Android Cutey Honey or by the ADV Films title New Cutey Honey) is a 1994, Japanese anime series in the Cutie Honey media franchise created by Go Nagai. Inspired by continued popularity of the original 1973 Cutie Honey television series, and first announced by Toei Video in October 1993, it was the only Cutie Honey anime production to be licensed for distribution in the United States until Discotek Media released the 1973 series on DVD in November 2013. Unlike the original, it was developed as an OVA (original video animation), a type of anime made for home video. The OVAs were released by ADV Films in the US, and have also been sold in the United Kingdom, France, Italy, Australia, and New Zealand.

Set one hundred years after the original, it follows protagonist Honey Kisaragi, along with her friends from the Hayami family, as she fights criminals in the fictional Cosplay City. Honey, a female android, has a device within her that allows her to transform into various personas, or summon weapons and other powers, by shouting "Honey Flash!" The first four episodes contain a complete story in which Honey battles the forces of Dolmeck, a man feared even by other criminals. In later episodes, she defeats other enemies empowered by her returning former nemesis, Panther Zora. The series staff planned to make at least twelve episodes, but it ended with eight in 1995. A 2004 DVD release included a scripted but unfilmed ninth episode—a Christmas story—as a drama CD.

New Cutie Honey includes many characters and cameos from or based on prior works by Nagai, such as Mazinger Z and Devilman. It has inspired merchandise of its own, including many scale model kits of Honey. ADV's English language dub of the series features Jessica Calvello, whom Nagai picked for the title role. Critical responses to the series have focused on its production values and voice work, and have explored Honey's transformations—which often tear off her clothes and show her naked body as they occur—in relation to her strong character traits. It has also been compared and contrasted with other anime based on Nagai's works.

== Plot ==
New Cutie Honey is set 100 years after the events of the original 1973 Cutie Honey television series, in the fictional Cosplay City. Mayor Light (ライト市長, Raito shichō; voiced by Sho Hayami in its original Japanese and Jason Douglas in its English dub) vows to rein in a citywide crime wave and restore peace. However, a self-proclaimed "Lord of Darkness" named Dolmeck (ドルメック; v.b. Yūsaku Yara and Bryan Bounds), feared even by other criminals there, seeks to derail his efforts in the first four episodes. A large freelance gang of armored, axe-wielding mutant motorcyclists, joined by two of Dolmeck's allies—Black Maiden (ブラックメイドン; v.b. Taeko Yamada and Tamara Lo), a very young-looking red-haired girl who rides naked in a humanoid robot slightly shorter than him and can psychokinetically move objects and people; and Peeping Spider (ピーピングスパイダー; v.b. Hirohiko Kakegawa and Guil Lunde), who wears decorative robotic spider legs and an electronic trinocular scope, and can use stealth technology, see through objects, sense spacetime disturbances, and trap people in strong webs—attack an outdoor meeting of the Mayor and his fellow citizens. Dolmeck then halts the attackers and asks the Mayor to rule the city with and under him. Unknown to all, Light's secretary Honey Kisaragi (如月 ハニー, Kisaragi Hanī; v.b. Michiko Neya and Jessica Calvello) is a gynoid who previously could transform into the titular red-haired, sword-wielding heroine Cutie Honey or summon other personas and powers, often after shouting "Honey Flash!" She later confronts the biker gang and Deathstar, another female minion of Dolmeck, and inadvertently regains those abilities and lost memories before defeating the group.

Chokkei Hayami (left), Honey (in Cutie form), and Danbei Hayami

Light agrees to fight crime in the city with Honey's help. She moves into the home of Danbei Hayami (早見 団兵衛, Hayami Danbei; v.b. Kōsei Tomita and Tristan MacAvery), a returning character from the 1973 Cutie Honey series. He is now both a 150-year-old cyborg fitted with many sensors and tools, and a pervert who often tries to see Honey naked and even asks her to transform to do so. They live there with his young grandson Chokkei (早見 直慶, Hayami Chokkei; v.b. Rica Matsumoto and David Nance), who has a crush on Honey and wishes to become like Mayor Light; and Chokkei's parents, who themselves attempted to rob a city bank in the first episode. Chokkei's mother Daiko (早見 大子, Hayami Daiko; v.b. Rica Fukami and Tiffany Grant) is a self-proclaimed expert thief who can summon increased strength when her son is in danger, and a descendant of Seiji Hayami from the original TV series. His father Akakabu (早見 赤カブ, Hayami Akakabu; v.b. Wataru Takagi and Greg Stanley) loves his wife and son but, like Danbei, is not above peeking at Honey when she showers.

Black Maiden, Dolmeck, and Peeping Spider

Honey remembers that the minion she defeated injected liquid from a "capsule" to transform into a monster. She fights other capsule users, then seeks the capsules' source. After she defeats a female capsule distributor, Peeping Spider learns and reveals Honey's true robot form. He kidnaps Chokkei and sends him to Dolmeck's airship, and Honey and the rest of the Hayamis fly there to rescue him; they fight Peeping Spider, defeat Black Maiden, and attack a large structure in the ship along the way. Maiden then reveals herself to be Panther Zora (Honey's nemesis and the leader of the Panther Claw in the original series) reborn; Honey wounds Dolmeck, and his body releases the fallen evil souls of all the countless villains Honey has killed. Zora then absorbs them, evolving her body into that of a fully adult woman. Honey tries to re-seal Dolmeck's body, while Danbei destroys the airship. After the entire Hayami family escapes the ship with Danbei's jet pack, Honey emerges alive from within a falling rock.

The next four episodes are set an unspecified time after the battle with Dolmeck. Chokkei has grown older and fond of Honey, and the Hayamis remain with her to fight off antagonists who transform and gain their power through direct influence by Zora. Mayor Light rarely appears in this half of the series. A girl named Natsuko (夏子; v.b. Junko Iwao and Jenny Strader) appears in the fifth episode as a criminal who wants to use a nuclear bomb to get a ransom; she joins Honey's group by the sixth episode, often stays near Chokkei, and calls him "boy" to his annoyance. Her presence reminds Honey of her old friend of the same name who died at the hands of Sister Jill in the original versions of Cutie Honey and vows to protect her. Natsuko is initially confused by this until Chokkei explains the reason why. Later Chokkei and Natsuko start to have feelings for each other. In the seventh, Daiko—now a leader of a "United Thug Alliance" of gangs—goes with Honey and the Hayamis to rescue fellow thugs imprisoned by an army of "Thug Hunters", and reveals she fell in love with Akakabu for his persistence in an earlier fight with her. Peeping Spider returns in the eighth, last episode; there, Honey and her friends capture him and use his technologies to defeat a teleporting gold thief.

== Production ==
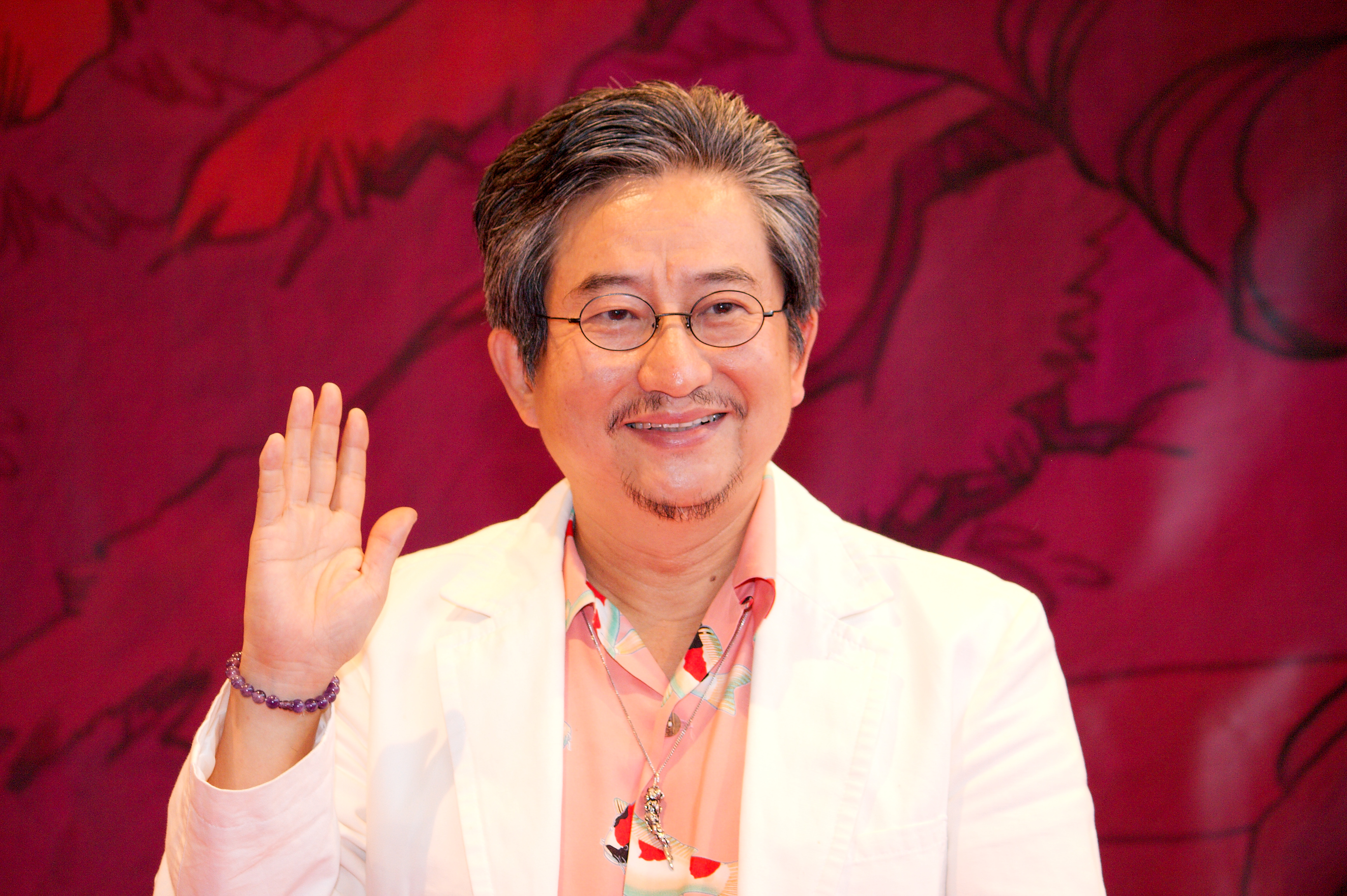
Go Nagai created the Cutie Honey franchise in 1973.

=== Background and development ===
The first anime incarnation of Cutie Honey was broadcast from October 13, 1973, to March 30, 1974, alongside the Go Nagai Cutie Honey manga that had started publishing on October 1, 1973. Fred Patten wrote in the liner notes for Rhino Entertainment's CD The Best of Anime (1998) that the series, even untranslated, was a favorite among early anime fan clubs for its nude transformation sequences and innuendos. Even as brief nudity became commonplace in 1980s anime, the continued popularity of Honey inspired New Cutie Honey's creation in 1994. Toei Video announced the series in a press conference dated October 12, 1993, with Go Nagai, series director Yasuchika Nagaoka, Hitomi (the lead singer of the group les 5-4-3-2-1, who perform the series' Japanese theme song), and Honey and Chokkei's Japanese voice actors Neya and Matsumoto in attendance.

The Japanese name of the series, 新・キューティーハニー, became officially romanized as New Super Android Cutey Honey or New Cutey Honey. It has also been spelled with "Cutie" instead of "Cutey". Unlike the original Cutie Honey, the series is an "OVA" (original video animation), one made for home video formats such as VHS tape. OVAs are known for their higher quality than anime television series, and Toei felt the new Honey was especially high-quality because (according to them) each episode used ten thousand cels, three times the usual number. By November 1994, series planner Naoko Takahashi said that Honey was tentatively set to last twelve episodes, with more to be considered later, but the series was cut short at the eighth episode, released in late November 1995. Several scenes in that episode have unshaded foregrounds, partly drawn characters with missing legs, or both. A script for a planned ninth episode was produced as a drama CD voiced by the series' original voice actors. Its English dub, made by ADV Films in 1998, features Jessica Calvello, who was hand-picked by Nagai to perform the voice of Honey. In a post at the Anime on DVD forums, voice actor and writer George Manley—who has worked for the Houston-based ADV—praised both Neya and Calvello's work in Honey as examples of "impressive" performances, and said that the series, whose dub was released four years before he began voice work, "was the title, and I often admit this, that brought me back to watching anime and started me on a long road to, 'Wow, I wonder what might happen if I moved to Houston...'".

=== Themes and cameos ===
Chokkei: Honey, I'm sorry. For not being more helpful back there.
Honey: No, you're wrong. The reason I'm able to fight is because of the way I feel for you.

— episode 2

At the 1994 Anime America convention, Nagai talked about the contrast between Honey and the dark Cosplay City: "I thought... well, what would Honey-chan do if she appeared in a dark futuristic city like in BATMAN. In the movie BATMAN, everything is dark. Dark background and dark characters. However, in the case of Honey-chan, she's super cheerful and sunny. She really stands out due to the dark background." He believed that New Cutie Honey differed from other anime that focus on settings and characters' expositions, and that Honey instead "makes her own moves, and she carries the whole story". On the relative weakness of male characters in the series, he said, "Honey-chan is like a mother, and she loves to protect weak men. Their existence is her reason to live, like oh, 'I have to fight to protect you.'"

Honey pays homage to some of Nagai's other creations, such as the Mazinger and Devilman series; the first two episodes alone include many cameos. The first shows Mayor Light and Chokkei in a picture with characters from Nagai's Harenchi Gakuen, Iyahaya Nantomo, and Oira Sukeban, while Devilman's titular character appears as a gargoyle. In the second, a scene in a downtown market in Cosplay City has cameos from Hige Godzilla from Harenchi Gakuen and Naojiro Abashiri from The Abashiri Family; a scene in Honey's bedroom shows a bust of Mazinger Z and a framed picture of her father, Dr. Kisaragi; and several scenes show Mazinger Z's Sayaka Yumi, The Abashiri Family's Kikunosuke, and an unnamed character from Kekkō Kamen as they get turned into plastic-coated statues. Cutie Honey's skin-tight, full-body costume uses the same design and tricolor (blue, black, and red) scheme as that of Nagai's original manga, but its chest opening—with rounded side edges—resembles the one in her 1973 anime attire. The opening sequence used in the first four episodes shows versions of Honey's original seven forms in the TV series: Kisaragi, Hurricane, Misty, Idol, Flash, Fancy, and Cutie. Danbei's techniques parody those of Nagai's super robots Mazinger Z and Grendizer. Later episodes feature appearances by Akira Fudo of Devilman and Professor Kabuto of Mazinger Z. In episode 7, Honey transforms herself into Kouji Kabuto. The title sequence of episodes 5 through 8 features Sirene, Devilman's nemesis, and Akira Fudo of Devilman along with Mazinger Z's Juzo Kabuto. Devilman can be briefly seen as one of the back-up guitarists for the one-time antagonist Saline in episode 3.

== Media ==
=== Episodes and releases ===
The eight 25-minute episodes of New Cutie Honey are directed by Yasuchika Nagaoka and produced by Toei Video, with animation services by Studio Junio. Their names in Japan are prefixed by "Stage.", followed by the episode number. Each episode title, from the fifth onward, is prefixed with "Dark Army Story (闇の軍団編, Yami no gundan hen)". ADV Films released the series in four two-episode VHS tapes with English subtitles. The subtitled versions were released between 1994 and 1996, and English dubs of the episodes were made in 1998. New Cutie Honey was followed by the TV series Cutie Honey Flash in 1997 and the three-episode OVA Re: Cutie Honey in 2004.

The series has been reissued many times for various markets, and was eventually shown on television and posted on the Internet. Four-volume VHS versions were released in France and Italy in 1996: the French version (also called Cutey Honey: La Guerrière de L'amour) was dubbed by Chinkel and released by Dynamic Visions (now known as Dybex), and the Italian (Cutey Honey: La Combattente Dell'Amore) was released by Dynamic Italia (now Dynit). Toei re-released the entire series on DVD on May 21, 2004, as the New Cutie Honey Complete Pack. The release included a drama CD called Kurisumasu ni Noroi no Yuki ga Furu (クリスマスに呪いの雪が降る, lit. "Cursed Snow Falls in Christmas") based on a script for an unfilmed ninth episode. ADV reissued the series on two DVD collections in November and December 2000, as a single two-disc Essential Anime edition on May 25, 2004, and on a three-DVD bundle with the Kekkō Kamen OVA in April 2008. The series was published on two DVDs in the United Kingdom, released on September 20 and November 15, 2004, by ADV Films UK. Madman Entertainment followed with a two-DVD collection, released in Australia on February 2, 2007, and in New Zealand on March 14. Two episodes were broadcast each month on the Toei Channel satellite television network between January and April 2003 and episodes were shown on the Anime Network in April and May 2004. The Anime Network added the series to their on-demand Online Player service on July 9, 2009. By then, ADV had divested many of their assets: the company transferred licenses to Honey and other works to AEsir Holdings, their home video distribution arm to Section23 Films, and Anime Network to Valkyrie Media Partners on June 1 that year. The license was recently transferred to Discotek Media for a Blu-ray release on July 30, 2019.

Writer Kurōdo Kyū (クロード·Q, lit. "Claude Q") (Note: In the Essential Anime Collection release, the writer's name is romanized as "Krodo Q" in the opening sequences of the first four episodes, and "Clode Q" in the others.) and composer Takeo Watanabe are credited for both opening themes of the series: "Cutie Honey", performed by les 5-4-3-2-1 for the first four episodes; and "Cutie Honey (English Version)", translated by Masaki Takjao, arranged by Takao Konishi, and performed by Mayukiss for the next four. The themes are based on the original series' theme "Cutie Honey". The English theme, which has a softer beat than the les 5-4-3-2-1 cover, is also used for the prior episodes in ADV's November 2000 DVD release. Three ending themes are used: les 5-4-3-2-1 arranged and performed "Circle Game" for the first and second episodes and "Rendez-vous in Space" for the third, and Mayuki Hiramatsu performed "Legend of Good-Bye" for episodes 5 through 8.

No.	Title	VHS release date (Japan) (Note: These were preceded by Laserdisc releases; for example, the third and fourth episodes were released on Laserdisc on July 21, 1994.)
Stage.1	"An Angel Descends" "Tenshi wa Maiori ta" (天使は舞い降りた)	April 21, 1994
The legendary warrior, Cutey Honey, returns to fight a new evil.
Stage.2	"The Sweet Trap of the Jewel Princess" "Hōseki Hime no Amai Wana" (宝石姫の甘い罠)	April 21, 1994
A villain kidnaps beautiful women in Cosplay City for her "collection." Honey is her next target.
Stage.3	"A Singing Voice Is the Devil's Temptation" "Uta Goe wa Akuma no Sasoi" (唄声は悪魔の誘い)	August 21, 1994
Honey and the boys investigate a popular singer. Honey's true identity is revealed.
Stage.4	"The Death of Honey? Crusade of the Skyship" "Hanī Shisu!? Matenrō no Seisen" (ハニー死す!?摩天楼の聖戦)	August 21, 1994
Honey and the Hayami family go off to rescue Chokkei from Dolmeck. An old adversary returns.
Stage.5	"Challenge! Fangs of The Evil Beast" "Chōsen! Jakūjū no Kiba" (挑戦!邪空獣の牙)	July 21, 1995
Honey must stop a time bomb from destroying Cosplay City.
Stage.6	"The Alluring Vengeful Demon" "Ayakashi no Fukushūki" (妖かしの復讐鬼)	July 21, 1995
Honey and the others find themselves in some sort of time warp.
Stage.7	"Prison Is the Nest of Evil" "Kangoku wa Jaaku no Toriko" (監獄は邪悪の虜)	November 21, 1995
Daiko and her comrades are kidnapped and imprisoned.
Stage.8	"Temptation Shines Like Gold" "Yūwaku wa Ōgon no Kagayaki" (誘惑は黄金の輝き)	November 21, 1995
Honey and the others must stop the villainous Gold Digger, who has stolen Dr. Kabuto's greatest invention.

=== Soundtracks ===
The music of New Cutie Honey has been released on several soundtracks, and some of the music has since been re-released on compilation albums. The first soundtrack, New Super Android Cutey Honey: Music Collection Vol. 1 (COCC-11513), was released on February 21, 1994, by Nippon Columbia Co. Ltd. (now Columbia Music Entertainment). It includes les 5-4-3-2-1's "Cutie Honey", advertised as a "more danceable" version of the original, and "Circle Game". It also has guitar work by Yoshio Nomura, background music by Kazuhiko Toyama, and dialogue between protagonists Honey and Chokkei. It was followed by Music Collection Vol. 2 (COCC-11840) on June 21, 1994, which includes a version of Cutie Honey sung by Michiko Neya, along with "Burning Up!", the theme of Saline used in the third episode; by Special Vocal Collection (COCC-12543) on April 29, 1995; and by Music Collection Vol. 3 (COCC-12551), which has the English Cutie Honey theme, on June 1, 1995.

The three-CD compilation Gō Nagai Collection: Gō Nagai & Dynamic Production World ~True Music Version~ (永井豪作品集 永井豪&ダイナミック・プロの世界～真・音楽篇～), released in June 1998, includes the les 5-4-3-2-1 version of Cutie Honey as the last of its 71 tracks. The 2004 compilation Cutie Honey Song Collection Special has six New Cutie Honey tracks.

=== Merchandise ===
New Cutie Honey and its characters have inspired a wide range of products, and the character Honey in particular prompted many model kits and figures. The New Cutey Honey Perfect Guide, an art book with character descriptions, interviews, and detailed summaries of the first two episodes, was released by Keibunsha on May 19, 1994. This was followed by New Cutey Honey Perfect Guide Vol. 2, made for the next two, on November 11 that year. The two books contain information on other series-based merchandise, such as Honey-themed telephone cards, posters, T-shirts, a 1/6 scale model kit of Honey by Noriyasu Tsushima, pencil boards, production materials, and a carrying case. A series special called "Flash.1", Tenshi no kyūjitsu (天使の休日, lit. "Angel's holiday"), was released on VHS and Laserdisc on November 21, 1994; it includes 30 minutes of selected scenes from the first four episodes and appearances by Nagai, Nagaoka, Neya, Matsumoto, and Fukami. In December 2005, a 283-page book by MEF containing drawings and production material from New Cutie Honey and the 1995 PC-FX video game Cutie Honey FX was released.

Two sets of six Honey figures, based on various forms she takes throughout the series, were released by Banpresto. Both have three common figures: one of her Cutie form, another of her "S&M Queen" form, and one of her Armoroid form with broken armor (which she takes during a battle in the eighth episode). 1/8 scale models of her Cutie and standard "Kisaragi" form—the latter first taken at the end of the first episode—were made by Volks; both show her with one foot on a base labeled "CH". A 1/6 scale kit of Cutie Honey lying on her side, with her sword in hand, was released in limited quantities in 2000 and 2001. Three 1/5.5 scale Honey kits that depict her diving suit (from the sixth episode), tennis outfit (from the English-language title sequence), and Kisaragi form were created by Kurushima and released between late 2002 and early 2004. 1/6 scale kits based on Honey's Cutie and Kisaragi forms, and 1/5.5 scale kits of her Cutie and partially armored forms, were created by Yu Makimura of Left-Hand. Last but definitely not least a few plushies have been released, Hurricane Honey, S&M Honey, Kisaragi Honey and also Cutie Honey has been found. It is unknown if anymore were released.

== Reception ==
Chris Beveridge of Anime on DVD (now part of Mania.com) gave positive reviews to the two New Cutey Honey Collections released in 2000 by ADV; he "was really impressed with the production values of this show" and called it "quite a bit of fun, especially for those looking for fan-service with a bit more intelligence and style than some of the other offerings out there". Two reviews of Honey on the website Anime Jump greatly diverged: site maintainer Mike Toole rated the series 3.5 out of 5 stars and called it "tons of fun, a light, tasty action-comedy that's ... spirited and silly and tongue-in-cheek", and praised its character designs as "letter-perfect to Go Nagai's original (quite appealing!) character designs"; Jason Carter praised Calvello's voice work in his review of the 2004 ADV release, but rated it 1.5 out of 5 stars, said that much of Cosplay City "goes back and forth between looking like an ordinary modern metropolis and resembling some sort of Smurf town built of polluted marshmallows", and concluded "The characters are largely annoying, the plot is hackneyed, the nudity is absurd, the fighting is rarely more than average, and the whole thing is ultimately pointless – as the series' later attempts at developing Honey as a person make all too clear." Sandra Dozier of DVD Verdict was also unimpressed with Honey: "I can see why it is popular—the glossy animation, the well-endowed chicks, the scant clothing. If that isn't your thing, however, there is very little to draw you to this series."

Reviewers have noticed Go Nagai's influence on New Cutie Honey; several considered it among the best anime based on his works, while others preferred different series. Dozier said that Nagai is "recognized in the anime world as an influential artist and storyteller who is known for preferring extra helpings of nudity and violence in his work", and that such influence "definitely comes through" in the series. Carlos Ross of THEM Anime gave earlier Nagai anime bad ratings, but called Honey "another Go Nagai-based anime that common logic should dictate that THEM rate harshly – except that we actually enjoyed it immensely", while calling its "awfully ugly backdrops, and weird-looking characters" "standard Go Nagai". Beveridge says he greatly preferred Honey over other Nagai offerings, but that "it really doesn't rise up too much higher than thinly veiled fan service with something of a story". Scott Green of Ain't It Cool News praised "Nagai's tasteless sense of strangeness" as the series' "highpoint", saying its "bright American style superhero design, with kaleidoscopic oddity, humorously gratuitous nudity and violence" make it "amusing nonsense". In his negative review, Carter said the Devilman-based Devil Lady was a more entertaining anime with a similar "impressively built woman fighting monsters" premise.

Many reviewers also contrasted its portrayal of main character Honey as a powerful figure with how it also shows off her body through her nude transformation sequences. Susan J. Napier, author of Anime from Akira to Princess Mononoke, distinguished the series from more pornographic anime such as Wicked City, Twin Dolls, and La Blue Girl. Napier thought that the series "sends mixed messages" because even though Honey has great strength and heroism, her transformations are very sexual in nature. She wrote that "the presumably male viewer is invited in, to participate in the unclothing and clothing of her nude body, while both male and female viewer alike are allowed the vicarious participation in the ecstatic transformation process", but quickly added: "Despite the regressive and voyeuristic aspects of her characterization, she is still clearly the film's hero, one worthy of admiration and emulation ... in the film's several violent scenes she more than holds her own." Dozier did not share that sentiment: she said "Honey does have some appeal as a fighter and as someone who cares very much about the people who are important to her, but her android past and her family life aren't explored too deeply—mostly, she's too busy getting into compromising situations and fighting evil."

Both Dozier and Yuricon president Erica Friedman wrote about the sexual nature of Honey, including the lesbian desire of the Jewel Princess (one of Honey's enemies) for her in the second episode. Friedman—who had looked for such "implied yuri" in Cutie Honey manga—called the Princess's appearance "*just* what I was hoping for", and praised Honey's change to her S&M Queen form in response. Ross said about the series: "It's seemingly exploitative, it's incredibly sexist, and the female members of my household – you'd expect them to be indignant, but, no, they were laughing their butts off because it was so blatant, and yet Honey was actually never objectified in the whole series." He further writes, "Honey Kisaragi is an extremely strong character who is no damsel in distress. If anyone needs help in this series, it's the guys!" Toole said that Jessica Calvello "gives the character a growling, tough-girl charm that was conspicuously absent from the original version", while Dozier said that Calvello captured "the combination of innocence and bravado [of Honey] that is both so confusing and yet so appropriate". Beveridge said the "fight sequences are pretty well done and provide some fun moments watching Honey battle the various demonic forms", but concluded that Honey's main goal is to showcase the lead heroine's changes: "Oh, lets face it. it's all about the half to completely naked transformation sequences. They're grrreat!"

== See also ==
- Fan service
- Wild Cardz (1997), another OVA directed by Nagaoka
