= Kazuhiko Toyama =

Japanese composer (born 1956)

Kazuhiko Toyama (外山 和彦, Toyama Kazuhiko, born October 10, 1956) is a Japanese composer. Toyama is notable for creating music for Bikkuriman, Cyber City Oedo 808 and New Cutie Honey. He is sometimes credited as Kazz Toyama.

== Music works ==
- Aconcagua
- Ai to ken Camelot: Mangaka Marina Time Slip
- A Wind Named Amnesia
- Bikkuriman
- Chōjin Sentai Jetman
- Crisis Core: Final Fantasy VII
- Cyber City Oedo 808
- Darkside Blues
- Doomed Megalopolis
- Eden's Bowy
- Goku Midnight Eye
- Goku II Midnight Eye
- Idol Defense Force Hummingbird
- New Cutie Honey
- Ogre Slayer
- Ozanari Dungeon: Kaze no Tou
- Starship Girl Yamamoto Yohko
- Tekken: The Motion Picture
- Vampire Wars
