= Cutie Honey: Tears =

- Poster
- Directed by: Asai Takeshi
- Based on: Cutie Honey by Go Nagai
- Starring: Mariya Nishiuchi
- Distributed by: Toei Company
- Release date: October 1, 2016
- Country: Japan
- Language: Japanese

Cutie Honey: Tears is a 2016 Japanese film directed by Asai Takeshi. The film is based on the manga series Cutie Honey written and illustrated by Go Nagai and stars Mariya Nishiuchi as the title character. It was released in Japan by Toei Company on October 1, 2016.

== Plot ==
In the near future, abnormal weather conditions and the spread of a virus has caused humanity's population to decrease. Artificial intelligence that were designed to help control the world's work and economy. In this future, the rich and powerful dominate the world and live above the poor. The poor live in the polluted streets with toxic rain pouring down upon them that is caused by the activities of the wealthy.

One man from the upper area, Dr. Kisaragi, plans to change the world for the better by creating an android with A.I. and emotions indistinguishable from a human using the brain memory patterns of his deceased daughter. The android Hitomi Kisaragi is brought down to lower areas at the cost of Dr. Kisaragi's life. On the surface, Honey pairs up with journalist Seiji Hayami and the resistance leader Kazuhito Uraki to fight against the oppressors of this world, controlled by the evil android known as Jill.

== Cast ==
- Mariya Nishiuchi as Hitomi Kisaragi/Codename: Cutie Honey
- Takahiro Miura as Seiji Hayami
- Nicole Ishida as Jill
- Sousuke Takaoka as Kazuhito Uraki
- Tasuku Nagase as Ryuta Kimura
- Ren Imai as Yukiko Kiyose
- Eric Jacobsen as Chris
- Kouichi Iwaki as Dr. Kisaragi
- Go Nagai (cameo only)

== Production ==
Principal photography ended in December 2015.

== Release ==
The film was released in Japan by Toei Company on October 1, 2016.
