= Cutie Honey =

Japanese manga series by Go Nagai

- Volume 1 of a 2-volume version of Nagai's 1973 Cutie Honey manga, published by Akita Shoten

キューティーハニー (Kyūtī Hanī)
- Genre: Magical girl, science fiction
- Manga
- Written by: Go Nagai
- Published by: Akita Shoten
- English publisher: NA: Seven Seas Entertainment
- Magazine: Weekly Shōnen Champion
- Original run: October 1, 1973 – April 1, 1974
- Volumes: 2
- Anime television series
- Directed by: Tomoharu Katsumata
- Written by: Masaki Tsuji
- Music by: Takeo Watanabe
- Studio: Toei Animation
- Licensed by: EU: RZD; NA: Discotek Media
- Original network: ANN (NET)
- Original run: October 13, 1973 – March 30, 1974
- Episodes: 25
- Manga
- Written by: Go Nagai
- Illustrated by: Yuu Okazaki
- Published by: Kodansha
- Magazine: Nakayoshi
- Original run: October 1973 – February 1974
- Volumes: 1
- Manga
- Written by: Go Nagai
- Illustrated by: Ken Ishikawa
- Published by: Akita Shoten
- Magazine: Boken Oh
- Original run: November 1973 – May 1974
- Volumes: 1
- Manga
- Written by: Go Nagai
- Illustrated by: Masatoshi Nakajima
- Published by: Tokuma Shoten
- Magazine: TV Land
- Original run: November 1973 – March 1974
- Volumes: 1
- Manga

Cutie Honey 90s
- Written by: Go Nagai
- Published by: Fusosha
- English publisher: NA: Studio Ironcat
- Magazine: Shukan SPA!
- Original run: July 8, 1992 – April 7, 1993
- Volumes: 2
- Manga

Cutie Honey Tennyo Densetsu
- Written by: Go Nagai
- Published by: Futabasha
- Magazine: Manga Action
- Original run: August 21, 2001 – July 29, 2003
- Volumes: 9
- Manga

Cutie Honey a Go Go!
- Written by: Hideaki Anno
- Illustrated by: Shimpei Itoh
- Published by: Kadokawa Shoten
- English publisher: NA: Seven Seas Entertainment
- Magazine: Tokusatsu Ace
- Original run: November 28, 2003 – July 1, 2005
- Volumes: 2
- Manga

Cutie Honey SEED
- Written by: Go Nagai
- Illustrated by: Komugi Hoshino
- Published by: Akita Shoten
- Magazine: Young Champion
- Original run: June 22, 2004 – February 14, 2006
- Volumes: 4

Cutie Honey (Japanese: キューティーハニー, Hepburn: Kyūtī Hanī; formerly spelled in English as Cutey Honey) is a Japanese shōnen manga series written and illustrated by Go Nagai. First appearing in Weekly Shōnen Champion's 41st issue of 1973, the series ran until April 1974. It follows an android girl named Honey Kisaragi, who transforms into the busty, red or pink-haired heroine Cutie Honey to fight against the assorted villains that threaten her or her world. One of the trademarks of the character is that the transformation involves the temporary loss of all her clothing in the brief interim from changing from one form to the other.

The Cutie Honey franchise spans many works, including numerous manga series, three anime television series, two OVA series, two drama CDs, three live action adaptations, and four stage plays. The first anime aired in 1973 and is considered a magical girl series in retrospect. In addition, the theme song of the series has become one of the most famous theme songs in the history of anime, and is widely known in Japan, even to those unfamiliar with the series. Despite the many different Cutie Honey works made, this theme song continues to be sung in all live-action and animated works (except Cutie Honey Universe), with different arrangers and singers. According to a Bandai survey, Cutie Honey ranked first in the "Favorite Characters" surveyed in April 1997 in two categories: girls aged 3 to 5 and girls aged 6 to 8.

== Story ==
Honey Kisaragi is a regular, 16-year-old Catholic schoolgirl, until the day her father is murdered by the "Panther Claw" organization. After his death, she learns she is actually an android created by him and within her is a device that can "create matter from the air" (空中元素固定装置, kūchū genso kotei sōchi; variously translated as "[atmospheric] element condenser mechanism", "Fixed System of Air Elements", "Airborne Element Solidifier", "Atmospheric Element Condenser", etc.). With her cry of "Honey Flash!" she can use the device to transform into the sword-wielding red-haired heroine, Cutie Honey. This device, or similar devices, have been used to explain her powers in all later Honey versions.

While attending the Saint Chapel School for Girls (in Cutie Honey Flash, the school is co-ed instead of being an all-girls school), Honey seeks revenge against the Panther Claw organization, which is ruled by Panther Zora and her younger sibling Sister Jill. Zora wants "the rarest items in the world" and seeks to steal the device within Honey created by her father, which would allow them to "create an endless supply of jewels". Meanwhile, Jill, leader of the group's division in Japan, "only wants the finest riches" and has a crush on Honey.

Honey is assisted in her quest by Danbei Hayami and his two sons: journalist Seiji and the young Junpei. Danbei and Junpei are based on the characters Daemon and Kichiza from Go Nagai's earlier work, Abashiri Family. Nagai's manga also borrows the character Naojiro from that series—reimagined in a female form as Sukeban Naoko—while the anime adaptation incorporates Paradise School along with the characters Naojiro and Goemon. In this version, Naojiro serves as Paradise Academy's gang leader, while Goemon is a teacher.

Honey is mischievous for a Japanese heroine, often teasing her male friends and mocking her enemies in combat. When transforming into Cutie Honey, she gives a brief rundown of the forms she has previously taken in that particular episode, and then declares, "But my true identity is ..." before yelling "Honey Flash!" and transforming. At school, Honey is something of a "class clown" who enjoys teasing and pranking her teachers Alphonne and Hystler. Much of the comic relief in the series comes from Honey's exploits at school. Hystler initially sees Honey as an incorrigible pest, while Alphonne is attracted to Honey and goes out of her way to be nice to her. Honey's best friend and roommate at school is the cute, freckle-faced Natsuko "Nat-chan" Aki. In the manga, Nat-chan, as well as the other students, had a crush on Honey; this crush was omitted in the TV series.

Some of Cutie Honey's forms in the TV series, as shown in Tokuma Shoten's Cutie Honey Roman Album Archive book. Clockwise from top right: Kisaragi, Misty, Idol, Hurricane, Cutie.

Honey has a large array of transformations in the series, her most common personae including:

- Hurricane Honey (biker), the top female racer in Japan.
- Misty Honey (singer), a singer with a dusty voice, who cross dresses.
- Idol Honey (stewardess), foreign airline stewardess.
- Flash Honey (cameraman), a reporter who blinds her opponents with her camera's "flash."
- Fancy Honey (model), a classy model who uses a long-stick cigar as a weapon.
- Cutie Honey (heroine), a sword-wielding warrior of love.

== Production ==
In 1972, Nagai wrote that the idea to create a hero with seven transformations was pitched by a Toei Animation producer. His inspiration for this character came from classic shows that featured protagonists who took seven different forms, including the Bannai Tarao mysteries and Warrior of Love Rainbowman (1972). His decision to make the protagonist a "female android" came from female characters from his previous works, Harenchi Gakuen and Abashiri Family, and from the character Maria from Metropolis. The series' working title was Honey Idol, as stated by Go Nagai the booklet of a DVD release. Nagai revealed in the afterword of a later manga rerelease that Honey Kisaragi's name is a reference to the 1965 American TV series Honey West.

Originally, Cutie Honey was meant to be a shōjo series like the later Cutie Honey Flash, and was planned to focus more on the relationship between Honey Tachibana (original name for Honey Kisaragi) and Shun Kazami (original name for Seiji Hayami) as well as lacking any nudity or excessive violence. A great deal of merchandising was initially planned, such as 'changing' dolls of Honey. The manga was slated to run in the monthly Ribon magazine, and the series was set to air Mondays at 7:00 pm on NET (now TV Asahi), a timeslot previously held by magical girl series, but the timeslot was given to Miracle Shōjo Limit-Chan instead and Cutie Honey was set to air Saturdays at 8:30 pm on the programming block Majū Kaijin Daihenshin!!! which previously aired Micord S and Devilman. Because of this, Cutie Honey retooled into a shōnen series, making it the first magical girl series for young boys.

Although the series had done well in the ratings department, especially compared to its predecessor, Microid S, it was canceled after only 25 episodes, the primary reason being concerns over salacious content. The cancellation took producer Toshio Katsuta by surprise, as he was sure the series would last for three or four seasons. His confidence was why Paradise Academy was introduced so late into the series. Katsuta and Go Nagai both decided the series should end with Honey's final battle with Sister Jill, leaving Panther Zora at large.

== Media ==
=== Manga ===
The original work of the franchise was the Cutie Honey manga series written and illustrated by Go Nagai that ran in Weekly Shōnen Champion magazine from October 1973 to April 1974. During the same time, other short manga series were published in different magazines than the original, and by different creative teams. These included two manga made by Ken Ishikawa, another two by Yū Okazaki, one by Chizuko Beppu, one by Yoshiko Suganuma, and another by Masatoshi Nakajima. Nagai's 1973 manga was republished in 1985 as a single volume, but no further manga versions of Cutie Honey were produced until 1992.

Magazine	Original run	Artist
Shonen Champion	October 1973 – March 1974	Go Nagai
Bouken Oh	October 1973 – April 1974	Ken Ishikawa
Nakayoshi	November 1973 – January 1974	Yu Okazaki
TV Magazine	October 1973 – February 1974	Yu Okazaki
TV Land	November 1973 – March 1974	Masatoshi Nakajima
Eiga TV Magazine	November 1973 – February 1974	Ken Ishikawa
Tanoshii Youchien	November 1973 – February 1974	Yoshiko Suganuma
Otomodachi	November 1973 – April 1974	Chizuko Beppu

Cover of Part 1 of Volume 2 of Cutie Honey '90, showing major villain Sister Jill holding a whip, illustrated by Hajime Sorayama

In 1992, Nagai created a new Cutie Honey manga, simply titled Cutie Honey, set 30 years after his original. The manga ran in Weekly SPA! magazine from July 1992 to April 1993. It was released in the United States in 1997 by the now-defunct Studio Ironcat, as Cutie Honey '90. It has received criticism for having "bad quality" and "clumsy" looking characters. Set 30 years after the original manga, Honey teams up with Officer Todoroki and the Hayami family to battle a revived Sister Jill.

Several manga adaptations of 1997's Cutie Honey Flash anime were published between March 1997 and April 1998 in various magazines. These included three manga made by Yukako Iisaka, another three by Shinko Kumazaki, and one by Kazushi Sasaki.

Running from August 2001 to July 2003, Cutie Honey: Legend of an Angel (キューティーハニー天女伝説, Kyūtī Hanī Tennyo Densetsu) was written and illustrated by Go Nagai and published in Weekly Manga Action magazine. Set in 2005, Seiji Hayami's daughter, Seiko struggles with apparitions of monstrous beings, including the Panther Claw terrorist organization, which she must defeat with the help of Hisashi Hanyu, who is Cutie Honey in disguise.

Cutie Honey a Go Go! (キューティーハニー a Go Go!, Kyūtī Hanī a Go Go) ran from November 2003 to July 2005 in Tokusatsu Ace magazine. Two volumes were planned, but only one was released. The manga was not fully released until October 2007, when a complete edition was published. An omnibus volume was released in March 2018 by Seven Seas Entertainment. In this version of the tale, Natsuko Aki is a squad leader for the public safety bureau. Natsuko takes it upon herself to arrest Honey, but Dr. Kisaragi asks Natsuko to befriend Honey and help her become more human.

Cutie Honey Seed (キューティーハニーSEED, Kyūtī Hanī Shīdo) ran from June 2004 to February 2006; it was "written by Go Nagai, but not drawn by him", and tells the story of a boy named Yuuta, a Cutie Honey fan, who meets an alien with powers similar to those of Honey.

Honey & Yukiko Hime: Cutie Heroine Daisakusen was a digital manga published in 2008 that was written by Go Nagai and illustrated by Kazuhiro Ochi. The manga is a crossover between Cutie Honey and another Go Nagai manga, Dororon Enma-kun.

Cutie Honey vs Abashiri Family was a manga published in Weekly Shonen Champion magazine in 2009 that was written an illustrated by Go Nagai. Made to celebrate Shonen Champion's 40th anniversary, the manga is a crossover between Cutie Honey and The Abashiri Family, another Go Nagai manga.

HoneyVS was a one-shot manga published in Grand Jump magazine in 2012 by Masaki Segawa. The manga is a crossover between Cutie Honey and Getter Robo, another Go Nagai manga.

Oedo Honey was a one-shot manga published in Grand Jump magazine in September 2012 by Masakazu Yamaguchi. The manga is a story about Honey and Sister Jill traveling back in time to the Edo period.

Cutie Honey vs Devilman Lady was a manga published in Champion RED Ichigo magazine from June to October 2013 that was written and illustrated by Go Nagai. The manga is a crossover between Cutie Honey and Nagai's Devilman Lady.

Gekiman! Cutie Honey-hen was an autobiographical manga published in Weekly Manga Goraku magazine from July 2016 to September 2017 that was written and illustrated by Go Nagai. Chronicling the development of Cutie Honey while simultaneously retelling the original story, this manga was released to promote Cutie Honey: Tears. The manga was later re-tooled without the autobiographical portions as "Cutie Honey 2023."

A new tie-in manga for Cutie Honey Nova premiered online on April 1, 2025. Written and drawn by Naoto Tsushima, this new story follows Honey as aspires to be an idol at St. Capella Academy while battling against Panther Claw. New chapters are uploaded the first and fifteen of every month on Hobby Japan Web.

=== Anime ===
==== 1973 TV series ====
Toei Animation produced an anime television series titled Cutie Honey, simultaneously as the manga was being drawn. It was broadcast on NET (now TV Asahi) on October 13, 1973, and ran for 25 episodes until March 30, 1974. The TV series is much tamer than the manga version, removing much of the violence, gross out humor and lesbian undertones, but retaining Miss Alphonne's attraction to Honey. According to Go Nagai, the TV series ended after 25 episodes due to NET executives getting unhappy about the nudity. While the manga was marketed as "SFコミックス" ("science fiction comics"), the Toei anime is considered, at least in retrospect, a magical girl series. Character designs were done by Shingo Araki, musical score by Takeo Watanabe, scripts by Masaki Tsuji, Susumu Takaku, and Keisuke Fujikawa, while episode directors included Tomoharu Katsumata, Osamu Kasai and Hiroshi Shidara. The series stars Eiko Masuyama as Honey Kisaragi.

Outside Japan, the original Cutie Honey TV series was released was France, where it aired under the title Cherry Miel ("Cherry Honey") from August 1988 to February 1989, In November 2013, Discotek Media released a DVD boxset of the complete series in North America. In February 2025, they released the series on SD Blu-ray. The series was also dubbed and broadcast in Hong Kong in 1975.

For an anime television series, the original Cutie Honey achieved respectable ratings in Japan, and some of its cast and crew have worked on other major titles. The series achieved a peak rating of 11.6% for episode 18 (broadcast February 11, 1974) and generally scored ratings of around 8–10%.

==== New Cutie Honey ====
The original video animation series New Cutie Honey was released in 1994 and ended with eight episodes in 1995. The series stars Michiko Neya as Honey Kisaragi.

100 years after the decisive battle with Panther Claw, Honey Kisaragi now works as the mayor's secretary in the crime-prone metropolis of Cosplay City. One day, after being attacked by minions of the Demon King Dolmeck, who dominates the city, Honey regains her former power and memory and awakens as Cutie Honey. Honey faces a new battle against Dolmeck who is planning to revive her former nemesis, Panther Zora.

The series staff planned to make at least twelve episodes, but it ended with eight in 1995. A 2004 DVD release included a scripted but unfilmed ninth episode—a Christmas story—as a drama CD. The eight filmed episodes were released by ADV Films in the United States. Jessica Calvello, the voice of Honey in the English language version, was hand-picked by Nagai, though he originally wanted Winona Ryder. Until Discotek Media picked up the first anime, this series remained the only Cutie Honey anime to be commercially released in the US. Discotek Media released the series on Blu-ray in August 2019.

==== Cutie Honey Flash ====
Toei Animation also produced a shōjo Cutie Honey series, known as Cutie Honey Flash. It began broadcasting on TV Asahi on February 15, 1997, and aired until its conclusion on January 31, 1998. Employing many of the same animation staff as the recently finished Sailor Moon Sailor Stars, including Miho Shimagasa, Flash features similar character designs and fits the more traditional mold of magical girl series. It uses hand-drawn animation; according to Shimagasa, the use of digitally animated characters on hand-painted backgrounds was planned and tested, but later rejected.

The series stars Ai Nagano in her debut, as Honey Kisaragi. Nagano originally read for Natsuko Aki but was asked to read for Honey instead.

The series was dubbed and aired in Germany and South Korea.

The series is unrelated to the previous anime productions, being more of a re-imagining of the story. Most of the characters from the original TV series return, with the exception of Junpei, Naojiro, and the staff of Paradise School. The anime also introduces Misty Honey, a rival and self-proclaimed younger sister of Cutie Honey, whose name was chosen through a contest in Japan. Honey has a larger array of transformations as well, including versions of her original forms Hurricane Honey and Cutie Honey.

An anime film, Cutie Honey Flash: The Movie, was released in July 1997. The film takes place between episodes 19 and 20 of the television series.

==== Re: Cutie Honey ====
Gainax, along with Toei Animation, produced Re: Cutie Honey, a three-episode OVA series that adapts and expands on the 2004 live-action film, Cutie Honey. It was first shown on the Animax satellite television network, with the first episode airing on July 24, 2004, two months after the live-action film was released. DVD releases for each episode followed, with the first on September 21. While Hideaki Anno directed the series in general, each episode also had its own director and the three episodes differed in style. This time, Honey is portrayed by Yui Horie.

In August 2023, Discotek Media released the complete series in North America. A new English dub was produced, with Jessica Calvello reprising her role as Honey Kisaragi.

The Re: Cutie Honey Complete DVD, released on September 21, 2005, includes a CD drama starring the four voice actresses that have voiced Honey up to then: Eiko Masuyama (the '70s series), Michiko Neya (New Cutie Honey), Ai Nagano (Cutie Honey Flash), and Yui Horie (Re: Cutie Honey).

==== Cutie Honey Universe ====
Another anime television series in Cutie Honey franchise, Cutie Honey Universe, premiered in April 2018 as part of creator Go Nagai's 50th anniversary as a manga artist. The series, with its storyline and character designs closely patterned after the original manga, was directed by Akitoshi Yokoyama at Production Reed with Natsuko Takahashi handling series composition, and Syūichi Iseki designing the characters and credited as chief animation director. The series stars Maaya Sakamoto as Honey Kisaragi.

After Panther Claw holds hostages at a jewelry store, Honey teams up with the Panther Claw Criminal Investigative Services to fight against them. Unbeknownst to Honey, the group's key investigator, Inspector Genet, is really Panther Claw's leader, Sister Jill

=== Live-action films ===
The 2004 live-action film Cutie Honey, produced by Gainax and directed by Hideaki Anno, stars popular Japanese model Eriko Sato as Honey. The tokusatsu film loosely retells the story of Cutie Honey's battle against the Panther Claw to defend humanity and avenge her father. It was released direct-to-DVD in the United States in April 2007 by Bandai Entertainment. It is popular in Thai culture, and was distributed by Sutida Inc. media conglomerate. The film was not successful at the box office in Japan, leading to the bankruptcy of the production company, Towani, in September 2004.

In this film, there have been frequent cases of mass robbery of precious metals and disappearances of young women in Tokyo. Police inspector Aki Natsuko suspects Panther Claw's involvement in these incidents and begins chasing Cutie Honey, who was seen battling them. Honey Kisaragi, who works in an office, joins forces with reporter Seiji Hayami and Natsuko to defeat the evil Panther Claw and their leader, Sister Jill.

Another film, Cutie Honey: Tears, was released in the fall of 2016. Unrelated to the previous film, it stars Mariya Nishiuchi as a new version of Honey (here named Hitomi) in a cyberpunk world.

In the future, abnormal weather, as well as a virus, have caused a decline in the human population. In this world, the rich and powerful dominate the world and live above the poor, who suffer on the polluted streets below. One man from the upper area, Dr. Kisaragi, plans to change the world for the better by creating an android using the brain patterns of his deceased daughter. The android, Hitomi Kisaragi is brought down to lower areas at the cost of Dr. Kisaragi's life. On the surface, Hitomi pairs up with reporter Seiji Hayami and the resistance leader Kazuhito Uraki to fight against the oppressors of the world, controlled by the evil android Jill.

=== Live-action TV series ===
Made to commemorate Go Nagai's 40th anniversary as a writer, a live-action TV remake, Cutie Honey: The Live, premiered on TV Tokyo on October 2, 2007. Starring gravure idol Mikie Hara as Honey, the series focuses on a set of three transforming girls with different personalities and a Panther Claw run by four leaders. Dr. Kisaragi is portrayed by Go Nagai, the creator of the Cutie Honey series.

Honey Kisaragi, a second-year high school student who attends Shirobara Gakuen, hides her android status and lives a human life as an ordinary high schooler. She fights the mysterious secret society Panther Claw with the private detective Seiji Hayami. Meanwhile, Honey meets Miki Saotome and Yuki Kenmochi, but after several clashes with Panther Claw together, Honey gets know to the others, and their friendship deepens, forming a team of Cutie Honey, Sister Miki, and Sister Yuki.

In 2025 the Cutie Honey franchise returns as a 15‑episode live‑action short drama series titled Cutie Honey BELOVED ENEMY, premiering November 25 on the DMM service.

=== Video games ===
- Cutie Honey FX (キューティーハニーFX, Kyūtī Hanī FX), was developed by Datawest and released by NEC in 1995 for the PC-FX. The game has an original story. The player becomes a private detective and investigates mysterious disappearances alongside Honey. New Honey transformations Fantasy Night Honey, Wrestler Honey, and Command Honey were added. It is packed with over 40 minutes of animated scenes, using over 10,000 animation cels.
- Cutey Honey F, also known as Cutey Honey Flash (キューティーハニーフラッシュ), is a Sega Pico game released in 1997, based on the anime series of the same name. Sister Jill kidnaps Natsuko to lure out Cutie Honey. Honey investigates Natsuko's disappearance while having to deal with the Panthers stationed around her school and community. By helping her classmates and defeat the Panthers. Honey fights against Jill after tracking her down and wins rescuing Natsuko. Players control Honey by moving around various areas and interacting with other characters. At certain points, Honey can assume alternate forms to play mini games that advance the plot, most of which involve the Panther grunts and after the games are over, Honey becomes Cutie Honey and finishes them off. Every time one of these minigames are played, Honey loses a heart point and to recover them she interacts with certain NPCs in conversation and going on dates with some of them.
- Cutie Honey Love Flash (キューティーハニー ラブ♥フラッシュ, Cutie Honey Love♥Flash) is a mobile phone game developed by DeNA that was released in 2011 as social game offered through Mobage for feature phones. Dynamic Planning had a hand in the development including the animation designing. The game introduces new characters alongside familiar faces. It functions similar to other phone games that use digital cards in its gameplay. Players select an avatar that uses the Atmospheric Element Condenser, effectively becoming a Cutie Honey. To advance the game, players collect jewelry and makeover cards in the story mode quests in the fights against Panther Claw. Once enough is collected, the player performs a Honey Flash gaining new forms and abilities (e.g. Kung Fu Honey, Angel Honey, and Maid Honey).
- CR Cutie Honey (CRキューティーハニー) is a 2017 pachinko game manufactured by Newgin. The game character designs and forms for Cutie Honey in the game are loosely based on past incarnations of the character, with RE: Cutie Honey being the strongest influence as Cutie Honey's superhero costume in this title is a revamped version of the 2004 design.

=== Stage plays ===
Several stage plays based on the Cutie Honey franchise have been produced, the first of which was in April 1997, when Cutie Honey F Show was performed. The next time Cutie Honey would be seen on stage was in 2003, when Cutie Honey Magical Stage was held at the Bandai Museum from July to August of that year.

Cutie Honey Emotional was performed in February 2020 at the Sunshine Theater in Tokyo. Cutie Honey is portrayed by former NMB48 member, Kei Jonishi. The play was written and directed by Ichidai Matsuda.

Cutie Honey The Live Autumn Cultural Festival !!! was performed from September to October 2020 at Tokyo Theater 1010.

Cutie Honey CLIMAX was performed in June 2021 at Tokyo Theater 1010. The play is a sequel and final chapter to Cutie Honey Emotional and Cutie Honey The Live Autumn Cultural Festival !!!.

== Theme song ==
The Cutie Honey opening theme, which appears throughout all of the Honey anime and live-action versions, except for Universe, is known for its lyrics by "Claude Q" (クロード・Q, Kurōdo Kyū) describing Honey and her body. The 1973 series' theme, originally intended for Linda Yamamoto to perform, was sung by Yoko Maekawa. In Cutie Honey Flash, it is performed by SALIA. In the New Cutie Honey OVA, the original song is performed by les-5-4-3-2-1, and the English language version by Mayukiss. Kumi Koda performed it for the Re: Cutie Honey OVA and its live-action adaptation. In Cutie Honey: The Live, the theme is sung by Minami Kuribayashi as part of Wild 3-Nin Musume.

Other artists have also covered the song, including GO!GO!7188 for their Tora no Ana album, Masami Okui in the Masami Kobushi album, and a version by TWO-MIX. Animetal Lady also did a cover of the song for their 1998 album Animetal Lady Marathon, with the lyrics sung by Mie of the Japanese pop group Pink Lady. Pop star Ahyoomee's solo debut was a Korean adaptation of Koda's version; it became highly popular online, despite controversy over her pronunciation of the lyrics and her "unambiguously Japanese" outfit in one performance. Harp player Mika Agematsu covered the theme—and songs from Lupin III, Candy Candy, and others—in her album Anipa (UCCS-1088); it was released by Universal Music in June 2006 in Japan, and in February 2009 in the United States. In the fourth edition of her 2016 "BELIEVE" single, Mariya Nishiuchi recorded a "CUTIE HONEY -TEARS- version" of the song for the B-side; "BELIEVE" is the theme song of the live action film Cutie Honey: Tears, in which she played the title character. Idol singer Ayaka Sasaki of Momoiro Clover Z has also sung the song in various concerts, including the 2019 Tokyo Idol Festival.

The song can also be heard during episode 27 of the 1974 magical girl TV series Majokko Megu-chan, when the main character Megu watches Honey, in her pop idol persona (Misty Honey), perform it on TV. In the seventh episode of the 2006 series Princess Princess, the Princesses also perform it, singing a few lines from the theme for an opening to a choir concert.

A "self cover" CD, Cutie Honey (21st century ver.), with new versions of the opening and ending themes by Maekawa herself, was released in February 2008.

== Connections to other works ==
Since its creation in the 1970s, Cutie Honey and its heroine have been referenced and parodied in various works by Nagai and others.

=== Manga ===
Honey appears as a secondary character in Nagai's Violence Jack manga. There, Honey is the younger sister of Ryou Asuka and is living in New York City. When she hears of the earthquake that devastated Kantō, Honey and several of her friends go to Japan to search for Ryou, who has become the pet of the Slum King.

Honey's friends are alternate universe versions of her transformations in the 1973 series:

- Cutie (fencer)
- Hurricane (military)
- Idol (stewardess)
- Flash (photographer)
- Misty (police officer)
- Fancy (bodybuilder)

In the last volume, Flash, Misty, and Cutie are killed when they fall into a spiked trap when they try to free a chained up Miki Makimura. Honey is electrocuted when she tries to rescue Ryou from the Slum King. Idol, Fancy, and Hurricane die in an explosion. The spirits of the seven women come together to form Angel Honey, whom Ryou sees in his dreams. When Ryou returns to his true form, as Satan, he fights in his sister's memory.

Also, Honey's best friend Nat-chan (Aki Natsuko) – or a girl strongly resembling her – appears in the Devilman manga. Her appearance is brief before she is killed by a demon.

=== Anime ===
Honey makes an appearance in the last episode of the OVA adaptation of Kekkō Kamen as a student; her teacher from the 1973 TV series, Alphonne, also makes two brief appearances there. Danbei is a main character in Go Nagai's 1975 anime UFO Robo Grendizer; in episode 50 of Grendizer, Seiji Hayami appears taking pictures in a crowd. This scene also featured cameos by Hayato from Getter Robo and Babel II from Babel II. In the Japanese opening of Super Milk Chan, there are moments that directly parody the 1973 series' opening sequence.

=== Video games ===
A strategy video game, Majokko Daisakusen: Little Witching Mischiefs, was developed by Toys for Bob and released by Bandai in 1999, and features Cutie Honey and other magical girls from the animation studio Toei.

An RPG, Legend of Dynamic Goushouden: Houkai no Rondo, was developed and released by Banpresto in 2003, and features Honey and other characters created by Nagai.

== Notes and references ==
Notes

References

- 吉田陽一, ed. (June 25, 1999). エンサイクロペディアキューティーハニー: 永井豪ワール [Encyclopedia Cutie Honey: Go Nagai World]. Nakano, Tokyo: Keibunsha. ISBN 978-4-7669-3236-2.
