= Dororonpa! =

Japanese manga and media franchise

- Cover of the first manga volume published by Shogakukan

どろろんぱっ!
- Genre: Comedy, Supernatural
- Manga
- Written by: Mayumi Muroyama
- Published by: Shōgakukan
- Imprint: Tentōmushi Comics
- Magazine: Pyonpyon
- Original run: 1988 – 1992
- Volumes: 5
- Anime
- Directed by: Tetsuo Yasumi
- Studio: Shin-Ei Animation
- Released: April 8, 1991 – September 27, 1991

Dororonpa! (どろろんぱっ!) is a Japanese manga series written and illustrated by duo Mayumi Muroyama. Serialized in Shōgakukan's shōjo manga magazine Pyonpyon from 1988 to 1992, its chapters were collected into five Tentōmushi Comics tankōbon volumes. The series was adapted into a 114-segment animated television series produced by Shin-Ei Animation that aired on TV Asahi in 1991.

== Plot ==
When elementary school student Anko Daifukuji moves into a new home with her family, she encounters Komachi Ono, a self-proclaimed ghost who has wandered the Earth for a century. Because Komachi can phase through physical barriers, Anko's family is unable to exorcise her.

Angie, an apprentice angel serving under Archangel Michael, arrives on Earth to guide Komachi to the afterlife. However, her mission stalls after revealing that Komachi is destined to reincarnate as Anko's future child. To keep watch over Komachi, Angie moves in with Anko's grandfather Monakan, a monk who gives her Buddhist prayer beads (数珠, juzu) capable of hitting spirits.

Over time, Anko, Komachi, and Angie form a close friendship. Years later, when Anko enters middle school and begins dating classmate Tadashi Ono, Komachi recognizes Anko's growth into adulthood and departs on a global journey, promising to return as her descendant. In heaven, Michael informs Angie that a "King of Terror" is prophesied to bring ruin to Earth in July 1999, prompting an evacuation order. When Angie refuses to leave her friends, Michael grants her a promotion for her loyalty.

After completing her journey, Komachi ascends to heaven and is reincarnated with Angie's assistance. Anko, now 18 and married to Tadashi, gives birth to a daughter named Komachi. Michael warns Angie that the "King of Terror" will be a human child born with the intellect to create weapons surpassing nuclear armaments. Equipped with her memories of Komachi, Anko resolves to provide her child with guidance to direct her talents toward becoming a doctor rather than a force of destruction.

== Characters ==
Komachi Ono (小野 小町, Ono Komachi)
Voiced by: Fuyumi Shiraishi
A wandering ghost born in the Meiji period who haunts Anko's new house. Although carefree and silly, she has abilities such as passing through walls, poltergeist effects, and producing rap noises.
Anko Daifukuji (大福寺 あんこ, Daifukuji Anko)
Voiced by: Yuri Fuchizaki
An intelligent 6th-grade elementary school student who forms a bond with Komachi. She wields blessed Buddhist prayer beads gifted by her grandfather that allows her to hit spirits.
Monakan Daifukuji (大福寺 藻奈寛, Daifukuji Monakan)
Voiced by: Chafurin
Anko's grandfather and the head monk of Daifukuji temple. A powerful Buddhist priest who crafts spiritual items and assists in keeping Komachi under control.
Angie (御使 安爺, Mitsukai Anjii)
Voiced by: Tamao Hayashi
A low-ranking apprentice angel under Archangel Michael tasked with taking Komachi to the afterlife. She works as an acolyte at Monakan's temple to keep watch over Komachi.
Archangel Michael (大天使ミカエル, Daitenshi Mikaeru)
Voiced by: Kaneto Shiozawa
Angie's superior who oversees the ascension and reincarnation of souls.

== Media ==
=== Manga ===
Written and illustrated by Mayumi Muroyama (the creator duo behind Asari-chan), Dororonpa! was serialized in Shōgakukan's monthly magazine Pyonpyon between 1988 and 1992. Shōgakukan originally released five collected tankōbon volumes under its Tentōmushi Comics label.

The characters featured in two official crossover works with Asari-chan:

- Asarippa! (あさりっぱ!): A crossover chapter included in Volume 33 of the Asari-chan manga collection.
- Asari vs. Dororonpa! (あさりVS.どろろんぱっ!): A serialized competition spin-off in Pyonpyon later collected in a Tentōmushi Comics Special volume.

In 2015, following sustained reader interest, the series received a three-volume collector's reprint edition published by Fukkan.com, accompanied by a public signing event held by the authors.

=== Anime ===
An anime adaptation produced by Shin-Ei Animation aired on TV Asahi from April 8 to September 27, 1991. The show ran in 10-minute weekday time slots (6:50 p.m. to 7:00 p.m. Monday through Friday) comprising 114 short broadcast segments. Directed by Yasumi Tetsuo, the series starred Fuyumi Shiraishi as Komachi and Yuri Fuchizaki as Anko. The broadcast used a hybrid format mixing animated shorts with live-action host segments presented by singer Yui Asaka. The series opening theme song was CREAM SODA・MELON SODA performed by the rock band Go-Bang's and included on their 1991 album SAMANTHA.

A 115th segment ("Komachi's Filial Piety"), which did not air during the original network run, was later broadcast during television reruns in April 1992.

=== Streaming ===
The series is available on digital streaming platforms, including Apple TV, Amazon Prime Video, U-NEXT, and FOD.
