= Mayumi Muroyama =

Japanese manga artist duo

Mayumi Muroyama (室山 まゆみ, Muroyama Mayumi) is the joint pen name of Japanese manga artists Mayumi Muroyama (室山 真弓; born August 30, 1955) and her younger sister Mariko Muroyama (室山 真里子; born September 27, 1957). They made their professional debut in 1976 with Ganbare Aneko in Shōjo Comic.

In 1977, Muroyama published Asari-chan, which was collected in 100 volumes and which had sold 26,500,000 volumes total as of May 2006, making it the seventh best-selling shōjo manga ever in Japan. Asari-chan received the 1986 Shogakukan Manga Award for children's manga. Several of Muroyama's manga have been adapted as anime, including Asari-chan as both a television series and theatrical movie, Dororonpa! as a television series, and Mr. Pen Pen as a television special.

== Profile and Characteristics ==
The sisters began drawing manga in their hometown of Gyokuto-cho, Kumamoto Prefecture, when they were in junior high school and submitted their work to magazines for manga awards. After winning several awards, they moved to Tokyo when their younger sister Mariko graduated from high school. The older sister Mayumi worked as an office lady while aiming to make her debut as a manga artist. In 1976, one year after moving to Tokyo, she made her debut under the joint name of Muroyama Mayumi in Bessatsu Shojo Comic (Shogakukan) with the story Ganbare Aneko.

After publishing various one-shots, they made their debut in Shogakukan's school year magazine with Kintoto-chan, and in 1977 (Showa 52) began their first serialized work Happy Dandelion. Furthermore, their most famous work, Asari-chan, was serialized in "Shogaku Ni-nensei" for 35 years from 1978 (Showa 53) to February 2014 (Heisei 26), and gained popularity. Since then, they have continued to draw comedy manga for children in Shogakukan's school year magazines ("Shogaku Ichinensei" and "Shogaku Rokunensei" magazines), CoroCoro Comic, Pyonpyon, Ciao, and other magazines.

While the duo is also a manga artist, one person is in charge of the original story and the other in charge of illustrations. Mayumi Muroyama and her partner are both involved in the creation of the story and the illustrations. Incidentally, her younger sister Mariko is in charge of the rough sketches, and her older sister Mayumi is in charge of the inking.

She originally wanted to be a shoujo or horror manga artist but was not good at comedy manga, so she had only drawn a few chapters before her debut. However, at the request of the editorial department, she started serializing a comedy manga for the first time. This became a hit, and she continued to draw comedy manga for children for over 30 years, including her representative work, Asari-chan. This is rare among comedy manga artists, who are said to have short lives. In terms of the number of years alone, she boasts a long serialization that is comparable to that of Osamu Akimoto. He is the author of Kochira Katsushika-ku Kameari Ken-mae Hashutsujo, which was published in Weekly Shonen Jump for 40 years from 1976 (Showa 51) to 2016 (Heisei 28) without a single break. His representative work, Asari-chan, has a total of 100 volumes, making it the longest-running comic series published by Tentōmushi Comics.

They are very service-minded, and at the end of each volume or between stories, they post updates, easy-to-make recipes, and original manga to answer readers' questions. They also write a lot of original manga. In the author's page, they both say that they don't like people to know their ages, but they often start the conversation themselves.

In the past, readers have commented that the content is difficult to understand and if you can't appreciate the humor of Asari-chan, you can't be called a high school student. The fact that the content is not aimed at children and the story development is not easy for children to understand has been a source of concern.

In addition to manga, they have also published several novels that contain boys' love elements.

In 1985 (Showa 60), they won the 31st (Showa 60) Shogakukan Manga Award (for Asari-chan).

They have their own fan club, Zashiki Buta Club (commonly known as Zabu-tsu), which they host.

In 2014, they were recognized by the Guinness World Records as the "Most Volumes Published by a Comic Duo-Female Authors".

== Personal ==
- Before their debut, they had considered the pen name Yumi Mariko, combining the sisters' names, but their editor at the time disliked pen names. They instead published their work under the name "Muroyama Mayumi," which is essentially the sisters' real name. As a result, some early readers were unaware that there were two authors. The sisters were under the impression that they could not change their pen names, so they continued to use them reluctantly, but eventually they grew to dislike it and have not changed them to this day.
- They generally don't hire assistants, and always work as a team of two. When they've been really busy, they have recruited temporary assistants from our readers.
- They are heavy drinkers, with the sisters having consumed over 120 bottles of beer in one month. A significant proportion of the recipes for dishes introduced in the book are for drinking.
- She has written a book about her experiences with dieting (see below), and has tried almost every diet method that has been talked about. Even in her manga, which is aimed at elementary school students, there are many episodes related to dieting.
- Her favorite foods are fried shrimp and spaghetti, and there is a story in Asahi-chan that involves fried shrimp. She is also a long-time lover of spicy food, and regularly eats food that is so spicy that her father describes it as "not suitable for humans."
- Her older sister Mayumi burned her eyelids with cigarettes when she was a child, and perhaps because of this, both of them are non-smokers and have banned smoking in all workplaces. In the past, they allowed people working at the publishing company to smoke, but when one of them returned home, they hurriedly ventilated and deodorized the room. A person who happened to have forgotten something witnessed them doing so, so they banned smoking completely.
- Ever since her school days, she has hated being called by nicknames or without her first name. She would tell her classmates to call her by her proper name and with honorifics. This is likely due to the fact that she was raised being called by her parents with honorifics, but now in the manga she gives herself nicknames, "Mayumikan" and "Omaringo".
- There are two theories about why she switched to becoming a gag manga artist. One is that when she debuted, she wanted to work on both shoujo manga and gag manga. Another editor at the time persuaded her, saying, that if she tried to do both, she'll remain bad at both and never improve, so she decided to focus on gag manga. The other is that the first serialized work she received from a magazine company was for a gag manga. There is also an interview article that says that since gag manga is often serialized, you can expect a stable income for the time being. They discussed and decided that for now they'll focus on gag manga, and in the future they'll draw various other manga.
- Apparently when she was a student, she used to draw yaoi manga for doujinshi, and she even sold some of her manuscripts through her fan club.
- When she appeared on Nippon Television's Monday Late Show, she revealed that when she was in junior high school, she dreamed of becoming a manzai comedian.
