= Samansa =

Samansa may refer to:

- the Japanese form of the name Samantha
- the character Samansa Grey in the manga series Hyper Police
- the song "Samansa" on the album Samantha by 1980s Japanese girl band Go-Bang's
- the label Samansa of the Japanese adult film company Max-A
