= List of Himouto! Umaru-chan episodes =

Himouto! Umaru-chan is a Japanese anime television series based on Sankaku Head's manga for Shueisha's Weekly Young Jump magazine and produced by Doga Kobo. It follows the changing life of an eponymous girl. The series aired on ABC from July 9 to September 24, 2015, and was simulcast worldwide by Crunchyroll. The opening theme is "Kakushin-teki Metamorphose!" (かくしん的☆めたまるふぉ〜ぜっ！, lit. Core Basis: Metamorphosis!) and the ending theme is "Hidamari Days" (ひだまりデイズ, Sunshine Days). An original video animation was bundled with the manga's seventh volume on October 19, 2015, with another to be bundled with the tenth volume in 2017. A second season, titled Himouto! Umaru-chan R, aired from October 8 to December 24, 2017, and was simulcast by Anime Strike, Hidive, and AnimeLab. The opening theme is "Nimensei☆Uraomote Life!" (にめんせい☆ウラオモテライフ!, Second Year ☆ Back-to-Front Life!) and the ending theme is "Umarun Taisō" (うまるん体操, Umarun Exercises). The series is licensed by Sentai Filmworks.

== Episode list ==
=== Himouto! Umaru-chan (2015) ===
No.	Title (Note: English titles from Crunchyroll)	Original airdate
1	"Umaru and Her Brother"; Transliteration: "Umaru to Onii-chan" (Japanese: うまるとお兄ちゃん)	July 9, 2015
Umaru Doma acts lazy at home in her chibi form, but shows elegance when in public. Wanting to win an online contest, she teaches some tricks for her hamsters. After accompanying Nana Ebina and showing her talents at school, Umaru feasts herself at home. Later, Umaru and her brother Taihei buy groceries.
2	"Umaru and Ebina-chan"; Transliteration: "Umaru to Ebina-chan" (Japanese: うまると海老名ちゃん)	July 16, 2015
Umaru invites Nana for a study session. Umaru tries to awaken Taihei in order to pass time, but also turns fall asleep. After being defeated, Nana receives a dakimakura from Taihei that he won in the rock paper scissors contest at a game center. A few days later, Taihei takes advantage of meeting Nana to prevent Umaru from buying a game. The next day, Nana recalls when she moved to Tokyo a year ago from Akita and met Taihei.
3	"Umaru and Her Student"; Transliteration: "Umaru to Deshi" (Japanese: うまると弟子)	July 23, 2015
Umaru procrastinates in studying for the exam, but later do it with Taihei after getting a bad dream. Kirie Motoba later visits her to return her lost photo identification card, and sees her in chibi form. Pretending to be Umaru's sister "Komaru", she discovers that Kirie is nervous. Umaru discovers a power outage while watching a horror film.
4	"Umaru and Her Rival"; Transliteration: "Umaru to Raibaru" (Japanese: うまるとライバル)	August 5, 2015
Umaru plays a claw crane game to win multiple prizes in a single try. The next day, she and her friends play tennis. When Umaru accidentally breaks the akabeko received from Alex Tachibana, she attempts to fix it before Taihei returns home. Umaru participates in an arcade tournament under her alias "UMR", challenging Sylphynford in the finals. However, Sylphynford loses the match after being distracted.
5	"Umaru and Summer Vacation"; Transliteration: "Umaru to Natsuyasumi" (Japanese: うまると夏休み)	August 6, 2015
Umaru and Sylphynford play arcade games. Later, Umaru uses bath fizzies that Taihei hid in the drawer. Umaru and her friends spend a day in the mall.
6	"Umaru's Birthday"; Transliteration: "Umaru no Tanjōbi" (Japanese: うまるの誕生日)	August 13, 2015
Umaru buys soda from a convenience store at midnight and finds the outside to be very different compared to daytime. Taihei tries to find some way to pass time on his day off. Taihei splits up the room with a curtain in order to have his own private space from Umaru, but the siblings soon find it lonely divided off from each other. Umaru, Taihei, and Kirie play The Game of Life, where Taihei helped out Kirie during her struggling career in the game. Umaru becomes concerned when Taihei cannot remember her birthday, but she later discovers that he has secretly prepared for the party.
7	"Umaru's Onii-chan"; Transliteration: "Umaru no Onii-chan" (Japanese: うまるのお兄ちゃん)	August 20, 2015
When Taihei inadvertently discards a figurine box, Umaru goes too far in teasing him about it but becomes panicked when he has not returned home later that night. Nana invites Umaru and Taihei to a ramen shop. Kirie's brother, Takeshi, visits the apartment and meets Umaru in her chibi form. As Sylphynford asks Umaru to take her to an old-fashioned candy store, Taihei gets lost in a residential area, but the presence of a cat triggers some memories of when he and his mother used to walk through there.
8	"Umaru and Christmas and New Year's"; Transliteration: "Umaru to Kurisumasu to Shin'nen" (Japanese: うまるとクリスマスと新年)	August 27, 2015
Taihei works overtime on Christmas Eve, leaving Kirie to visit Umaru. Takeshi celebrates for New Year's Eve at Doma's apartment. He and Umaru end up complementing each other's cooking and snacks respectively. Meanwhile, a flashback of Kanau, Taihei, and Takeshi work at night shift on Christmas Eve.
9	"Umaru and Valentine's"; Transliteration: "Umaru to Barentain" (Japanese: うまるとバレンタイン)	September 3, 2015
Kirie makes bags of cookies for the Doma siblings. Nana makes a Valentine's Day chocolate with the help of Umaru and Taihei. Umaru and Sylphynford visit a doujin shop, bonding over their roles as sisters. Taihei attempts to converse with Kirie, who visited the apartment to give the cookies. The next day, Taihei discovers that Umaru ate the pudding.
10	"Umaru and Now and Once Upon a Time"; Transliteration: "Umaru to Ima to Mukashi Mukashi" (Japanese: うまると今と昔々)	September 10, 2015
After being left alone with a fever, Umaru plans to get revenge on Taihei when he got a cold. Due to his abnormal condition, Umaru "saves" Taihei. Umaru becomes irritated with peppers Taihei served, but she later appreciates the effort he put into making the bento. When Umaru inadvertently breaks the Internet modem-router, she spends the day at a manga café. In a flashback, Taihei, Takeshi, and Kanau won plushies in a claw crane game at the arcade.
11	"Umaru's Days"; Transliteration: "Umaru no Hibi" (Japanese: うまるの日々)	September 17, 2015
After getting a bag of rice from her folks, Nana is invited to have lunch with Umaru and Taihei. Umaru later has a serious internal discussion over what snacks to buy for Taihei. Nana becomes conscious about her stomach growl while eating out with Umaru and Taihei, but soon indulges in a parfait alongside Umaru. The rainy season has some adverse effects on Komaru and Kirie, prompting Taihei to try and take their minds off of it. That summer, the girls buy and eat ice cream.
12	"Umaru and Everyone"; Transliteration: "Umaru to Minna" (Japanese: うまるとみんな)	September 24, 2015
Umaru and Taihei visit a car dealership, but he is soon terrified from driving a car. On a holiday trip to Enoshima, Kirie becomes worried and explains to Umaru how her isolation in class is somewhat related to her feud with Takeshi. Umaru, Nana, Kirie, and Sylphynford spend the day at the beach.

==== OVAs ====
No.	Title	Original airdate
OVA1	"Umaru-chan One More Time!"; Transliteration: "Umaru-chan Mō Ichidō!" (Japanese: うまるちゃん もう1回！)	October 19, 2015
After she was tempted to buy a new pillow she saw on a shopping advertisement, Umaru dreams about her own dakimakura and learns to appreciate it. The next day, Umaru and Sylphynford visit a convenience store, where she tried to win a lottery prize. Later, Umaru and Taihei eat out at a Korean barbecue restaurant, unaware that Nana is at the next table over. Umaru and Kirie dress up in costumes on Halloween, and eat various pumpkin-based snacks Taihei served. When Umaru feigned illness, she feels guilty and decides to go to school.
OVA2	"The Secret Umaru-chan"; Transliteration: "Himitsu no Umaru-chan" (Japanese: 秘密のうまるちゃん)	April 24, 2017
On Taihei's birthday, Umaru asks Nana for advice on what to do for him. Umaru decides to act like an ideal sister and spends time with Taihei, only to discover that he prefers her the way she is. While the girls spend the day at a swimming pool, Umaru wonders if she should reveal to them that "Komaru" and "UMR" are her alter egos. As she becomes conflicted over what will happen if she tells everyone, her friends assure her that she does not have to reveal her secret if it will make her suffer. Relieved by the support of her friends, Umaru hides it.

=== Himouto! Umaru-chan R (2017) ===
No.	Title (Note: English episode titles taken from Anime Strike.)	Original airdate
1	"The Himouto Returns"; Transliteration: "Himōto no Kikan" (Japanese: 干物妹の帰還)	October 8, 2017
While Taihei works overnight, Umaru takes the opportunity to do her usual lethargic behaviour without her brother's scolding. That weekend, the siblings and Nana clean the garden behind the apartment block. Umaru, disguised as "UMR", teaches Sylphynford how to play soccer. On the day of the match, Umaru's team competes against Sylphynford's team. Despite losing the game, Sylphynford is praised by her teammates for her advices that she learned from UMR on them. Afterwards, Umaru manages to work up the courage and initiate conversations with her friends.
2	"Umaru and Alex"; Transliteration: "Umaru to Arekkusu" (Japanese: うまるとアレックス)	October 15, 2017
Alex is invited by Taihei to his apartment for dinner, bonding with Umaru over their mutual love of anime. Umaru deals with her itchy ears after Taihei accidentally stepped on their ear pick. Sylphynford invites Umaru to her house to study for the exam. Taihei teaches Umaru the proper cleaning of their room. Umaru and her friends watch the film.
3	"Umaru and Friends"; Transliteration: "Umaru to Tomodachi" (Japanese: うまると友達)	October 22, 2017
Kirie becomes wary of Alex when he came over to play a dating sim with Umaru. Taihei becomes worried when Umaru spent a lot of time to a video game. Umaru and Takeshi witness Taihei getting angry on them when they attempted to reach out for a cooking pot he is preparing. Kirie gets a dubious present from Alex and plans to discard it, but later decides to keep it. Umaru and her friends eat hamburgers in a fast food restaurant she saw in the commercial.
4	"A Party with the Gang"; Transliteration: "Minna to Pātī" (Japanese: みんなとパーティー)	October 29, 2017
Umaru and her friends celebrate Christmas together at Sylphynford's house, where Sylphynford expressed her gratitude towards UMR. As Umaru visits Sylphynford again as "UMR", Nana walks home with Taihei. On New Year's Day, Umaru inadvertently receives two allowances from Taihei, causing an internal conflict over the reason behind it. Later, Taihei informs Umaru that he will leave home for a two-week business trip.
5	"Big Brother Departs"; Transliteration: "Onii-chan no Shutchō" (Japanese: お兄ちゃんの出張)	November 5, 2017
Taihei, Takeshi, Alex, and Kanau go to Hamamatsu for a business trip, before Umaru can follow them. After he bonded with Umaru and sent her back home, Taihei and the others visit a restaurant, where he met Nana's brother Kōichirō. After returning home, Taihei and Umaru deliver souvenirs to their friends.
6	"Umaru and Dreams"; Transliteration: "Umaru to Yume" (Japanese: うまると夢)	November 12, 2017
While getting attention for placing third in a swimming tournament, Kirie reveals to Umaru that she wants to be a storybook author drawing about Komaru. Sylphynford invites Umaru, Nana, and Kirie to her house for kimono fitting with the help of her mother Miki. At an art supply shop, Kirie becomes worried about revealing her ambition to Taihei and Nana when she ran into them. Umaru tries to convince Taihei to use their air conditioner but he decides to use an electric fan.
7	"Umaru and Amusement Parks"; Transliteration: "Umaru to Yuenchi" (Japanese: うまると遊園地)	November 19, 2017
While on a trip to the amusement park with her friends, Kirie becomes downhearted following a string of bad luck, but later is encouraged by Umaru. Umaru and Hikari, receive a school award for their grades. Alex reveals to Umaru and Kirie about how Kanau encouraged him to gain friends instead of secluding himself in his room to watch anime. Nana reminisces about Kōichirō and likens him to Taihei.
8	"Umaru and Hikari"; Transliteration: "Umaru to Hikari" (Japanese: うまるとヒカリ)	November 26, 2017
Refusing to be alone with Takeshi while their parents are away, Kirie stays with Komaru overnight. After deducing that Nana likes Taihei, Kirie decides to help her. Umaru, Taihei, and her friends go to see fireworks. Hikari surprises Taihei and gets invited to his apartment. Umaru discovers Hikari knowing about Taihei.
9	"Himouto and Memories"; Transliteration: "Himōto to Omoide" (Japanese: 干物妹と思い出)	December 3, 2017
Umaru and Taihei take photos using Takeshi's single-lens camera. With the arcade where they usually hang out temporarily closed, Umaru and Sylphynford visit an old-fashioned department store, but they learn that it was demolished due to lack of customers. Nana tries to get near Taihei by helping him prepare for their lunch, while Umaru pretends to help them in order to disguise her lack of knowledge about cooking. As Umaru and Hikari remain hostile towards each other, Taihei tries to have them make pancakes together so they can get along. Umaru worries that she is causing her pet hamsters to become stressed, but later finds out that they enjoy playing with her.
10	"First Time for Everyone"; Transliteration: "Hajimete no Minna" (Japanese: 初めてのみんな)	December 10, 2017
Sylphynford invites Umaru to her house where she proposed to play a Pocky game together, causing Umaru to become uncomfortable as she tries to explain the game. That night, Hikari joins Umaru and Taihei in eating naan curry together. Umaru and Sylphynford visit Lake Sagami, where she visited ten years ago and made memories with Alex. Afterwards, the girls hold a study session to help Nana, who became worried of being held back due to low test scores. Recalling how she became friends with Umaru and the others, Nana overcomes her performance anxiety and passes the exams.
11	"Umaru and the Starry Sky"; Transliteration: "Umaru to Hoshizora" (Japanese: うまると星空)	December 17, 2017
Takeshi discovers that Kirie became friend with Umaru. Kirie opens up to Taihei of being a storybook author and receives encouragement from him. Kirie tries to help Nana get together with Taihei at an ice skating rink, but they never learn how to skate. Afterwards, Hikari joins Taihei in gazing at the stars, reminding them of when they first met.
12	"Everyone and Umaru"; Transliteration: "Minna to Umaru" (Japanese: みんなとうまる)	December 24, 2017
Taihei decides to hold a homemade okonomiyaki party against Umaru's request for pizza. On Christmas Eve, Umaru goes shopping for gifts with Taihei and Nana, finding it more fun than simply waiting to receive presents. Kanau tries to figure out how to get Hikari enjoy Christmas. Sylphynford invites her friends to her house for a New Year celebration and they later decide to play hanetsuki. When Umaru receives New Year's allowances from her friends, she overspends it.
