= Blue Archive: The Grand Adventure of the Game Development Department =

Japanese manga series

- First tankōbon volume cover

ブルーアーカイブ ゲーム開発部だいぼうけん！ (Burū Ākaibu: Gēmu Kaihatsubu Daibōken)
- Genre: Comedy, slice of life
- Created by: Nexon Games; Yostar
- Manga
- Written by: Asato Mizu
- Published by: Square Enix
- English publisher: NA: Square Enix
- Imprint: Gangan Comics Online
- Magazine: Gangan Online
- Original run: December 31, 2023 – present
- Volumes: 7

Blue Archive: The Grand Adventure of the Game Development Department (Japanese: ブルーアーカイブ ゲーム開発部だいぼうけん！, Hepburn: Burū Ākaibu: Gēmu Kaihatsubu Daibōken) is a Japanese manga series written and illustrated by Asato Mizu. It began serialization on Square Enix's Gangan Online manga website in December 2023. It is a spin-off manga of Nexon Games and Yostar's real time strategy role-playing game Blue Archive.

== Synopsis ==
The series is centered around the lives of the members of the Millennium Science School's Game Development Department: Momoi, Midori, Yuzu, and Alice, as they attempt to develop games with their limited experience in game development while also managing part-time jobs.

== Publication ==
Written and illustrated by Asato Mizu, Blue Archive: The Grand Adventure of the Game Development Department began serialization on Square Enix's Gangan Online manga website on December 31, 2023. Its chapters have been compiled into seven tankōbon volumes as of November 2026. The series is published in English on Square Enix's Manga Up! Global website and app.

No.	Japanese release date	Japanese ISBN
1	June 12, 2024	978-4-7575-9252-0
2	October 10, 2024	978-4-7575-9474-6
3	February 10, 2025	978-4-7575-9676-4
4	August 8, 2025	978-4-301-00015-0
5	January 9, 2026	978-4-301-00281-9
6	June 11, 2026	978-4-301-00582-7
7	November 12, 2026	978-4-301-00884-2

== Reception ==
The series was ranked thirteenth in the web category at the twelfth Next Manga Awards in 2026.

== See also ==
- Aharen-san Is Indecipherable, another manga series by Asato Mizu
- Denkigai no Honya-san, another manga series by Asato Mizu
