= Majokko Megu-chan =

Japanese anime television series

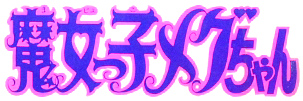
- Tenkoumushi Comics logo
- 魔女っ子メグちゃん
- Genre: Magical girl
- Created by: Hiromi Production; Makiho Narita
- Directed by: Shingo Araki; Yugo Serikawa
- Music by: Takeo Watanabe
- Country of origin: Japan
- Original language: Japanese
- No. of episodes: 72

Production
- Producer: Eisuke Ozawa
- Production companies: Toei Animation; NET

Original release
- Network: ANN (NET)
- Release: 1 April 1974 – 29 September 1975

Majokko Megu-chan (魔女っ子メグちゃん; lit. Megu the Little Witch) is a Japanese magical girl anime television series. The manga was created by Tomō Inoue and Makiho Narita, while the 72-episode anime series was produced by Toei Animation between 1974 and 1975. Majokko Megu-chan is considered an important forerunner of the present-day magical girl genre, as the series' characterization and general structure exerted considerable influence over future shows in the same genre. Most notably, several of the series' recurring motifs inspired Toei's Sailor Moon, AIC's Pretty Sammy, and (to a lesser degree) Wedding Peach.

== Plot ==
Majokko Megu-chan follows the experiences of a young witch who comes to Earth as part of her initiation into larger society. Megu is a contender for the throne of the magic realm but knows very little of human relationships. Sent to the human realm, she is adopted by Mami Kanzaki, a former witch who gave up her royal ambitions to wed a human. Mami bewitches her husband and their two children, Rabi and Apo, into believing that Megu has always been the eldest child of the family. Under Mami's tutelage, Megu learns to control both her abilities and impulses to prove her worth for the crown.

Megu-chan discovers emotions she did not know existed – loneliness, compassion, grief, love, desperation, and (perhaps most importantly) self-sacrifice. As the story progresses, she proves the nobility of her character through the various trials and tribulations of youth, evolving from a willful and rather selfish little girl into a kind, generous, loving young woman. She battles monsters, demons, and rival sorcerers – including her nemesis, Non – but quickly realizes that her true enemy is the darker side of human nature.

== Episodes ==
1. Here Comes the Pretty Witch (April 1, 1974)
2. That Girl is My Rival (April 8, 1974)
3. Lots of Witches (April 15, 1974)
4. The Light of Our Home (April 22, 1974)
5. Sorcerer of Love (April 29, 1974)
6. Papa Can't Afford to Laugh (May 6, 1974)
7. My Beloved Megu (May 13, 1974)
8. A Genius Venting His Anger (May 20, 1974)
9. Song of Sincerity (May 27, 1974)
10. A Marvelous Balloon Journey (June 3, 1974)
11. Messenger From the Moon (June 10, 1974)
12. Bow-Wow Chaos (June 17, 1974)
13. Duel! The Magical Mansion! (June 24, 1974)
14. The Phantom Harp (July 1, 1974)
15. Papa's Girlfriend?! (July 8, 1974)
16. From the Sky with Love (July 15, 1974)
17. Megu Times Two (July 22, 1974)
18. The Old Castle's Love Story (July 29, 1974)
19. Goodbye, Mr. Ghost (August 5, 1974)
20. Walk, Mil! (August 12, 1974)
21. Granny Chuck, Former Witch (August 19, 1974)
22. When Do Stars Fall Into the Sea? (August 26, 1974) (not dubbed in Italian or Portuguese)
23. Operation: Tearful Humilation (September 2, 1974)
24. The Stolen Dress (September 9, 1974)
25. The Phantom Boy (September 16, 1974) (not dubbed in Italian or Portuguese)
26. Great Magical Battle (September 23, 1974)
27. The Curse of Scorpio (September 30, 1974)
28. Baby Chaos (October 7, 1974) (not dubbed in Italian or Portuguese)
29. Tears of an Angel (October 14, 1974) (not dubbed in Italian or Portuguese)
30. The Mysterious Bullied Girl (October 21, 1974)
31. Yodel of Love (October 28, 1974)
32. The Shadow of a Witch Fluttering Her Wings (November 4, 1974)
33. Saturn's Messenger (November 11, 1974)
34. Guess Who's Coming to Dinner (November 18, 1974)
35. The White Horse Upstairs in Our House (November 25, 1974)
36. The Dolls That Left (December 2, 1974)
37. The Strange Transfer Student (December 9, 1974)
38. Paper Planes Bound Far Away (December 16, 1974)
39. Santa's Name is Apo (December 23, 1974)
40. The Great Tomboy Race! (January 6, 1975)
41. The Lost Polar Bear (January 13, 1975)
42. The Snow Festival of Friendship (January 20, 1975)
43. The Secret Snow Bird (January 27, 1975)
44. The Age of Rebellion is Here (February 3, 1975)
45. Red Shoes of Friendship (February 10, 1975)
46. Tale of North and Spring Winds (February 17, 1975)
47. Spring Rides in a Yacht (February 24, 1975)
48. Elegy of Dolls (March 3, 1975)
49. Pinwheel's Song (March 10, 1975)
50. The Flying Bag (March 17, 1975)
51. Please Take Care of Taro (March 24, 1975)
52. Gonbei Returns (March 31, 1975)
53. Underachiever of the Magic Realm (April 7, 1975)
54. Missing Cat (April 14, 1975)
55. Who's the Culprit? (April 21, 1975)
56. Secret of The White Lily (April 28, 1975) (not dubbed in Italian or Portuguese)
57. Koinobori High in the Sky (May 5, 1975)
58. Where is Gonbei? (May 12, 1975)
59. The Girl in The Rain (May 26, 1975) (not dubbed in Italian or Portuguese)
60. Young Master's Great Circus (June 2, 1975)
61. The Rain Man (June 16, 1975)
62. Due by Midnight, Bound for The Witch Realm (June 23, 1975)
63. The Blue Star of Tanabata (July 7, 1975)
64. Hopeless Swimmer Chaos (July 14, 1975)
65. Tram of Dreams (July 21, 1975)
66. Foggy Morning Paper, Taro (August 4, 1975) (not dubbed in Italian or Portuguese)
67. The Guitar and the Boy (August 18, 1975)
68. Summer Vacation's Brat (August 25, 1975)
69. Revenge Dog, Sigma (September 8, 1975)
70. Great Kite, Fly Me with the Sea Wind (September 15, 1975)
71. Final Battle: The Greatest Magic! (September 22, 1975)
72. Farewell, Megu (September 29, 1975)

== Music ==
In episode 27, Megu watches Misty Honey from Cutie Honey on TV singing the Cutie Honey theme. The same vocalist, Yoko Maekawa, performed the theme songs for both Cutie Honey and Megu-chan. The anime also reused some incidental music from an earlier magical girl series, including Mahō no Mako-chan. Takeo Watanabe composed the music for both series.
