= Aharen-san Is Indecipherable =

Japanese manga series and its adaptation

- Cover of the first tankōbon volume, featuring Reina Aharen

阿波連さんははかれない (Aharen-san wa Hakarenai)
- Genre: Romantic comedy
- Manga
- Written by: Asato Mizu
- Published by: Shueisha
- English publisher: NA: Seven Seas Entertainment
- Imprint: Jump Comics+
- Magazine: Shōnen Jump+
- Original run: January 29, 2017 – April 30, 2023
- Volumes: 17
- Anime television series
- Directed by: Yasutaka Yamamoto (Note: Credited as Chief Director (総監督, Sō Kantoku).); Tomoe Makino
- Written by: Takao Yoshioka
- Music by: Satoru Kōsaki; Monaca
- Studio: Felix Film
- Licensed by: Crunchyroll; SEA: Bilibili
- Original network: MBS, TBS, BS-TBS (S1); Tokyo MX, BS11, MBS, AT-X (S2)
- Original run: April 2, 2022 – June 23, 2025
- Episodes: 24
- icon

Aharen-san Is Indecipherable (Japanese: 阿波連さんははかれない, Hepburn: Aharen-san wa Hakarenai) is a Japanese manga series written and illustrated by Asato Mizu. It was serialized in Shueisha's Shōnen Jump+ service from January 2017 to April 2023 and was compiled into seventeen tankōbon volumes. An anime television series adaptation by Felix Film aired from April to June 2022 on the Animeism programming block. A second season aired from April to June 2025.

== Premise ==
In his first year of high school, making friends is not so easy for Shota Raido. One day in class, Raido tries to talk to his classmate next to him and thinks she is ignoring him, but later realizes she was shunned by her previous classmates for being clingy, awkward, and timid. Raido decides to help said classmate, Reina Aharen, to come out of her shell and befriend her for whatever it takes, and in turn coming out of his own rather odd shell.

== Characters ==
Reina Aharen (阿波連 れいな, Aharen Reina)
Voiced by: Inori Minase (Japanese); Dani Chambers (Note: Kelsey Cruz filled in for Chambers as Reina from episodes 13–15) (English)
An expressionless female high school student who is talented in many fields, such as cooking and arts. She becomes Raido's girlfriend. In her third year of high school, she wants to attend an arts school in another prefecture. She marries Raido at the end of the series.
Shota Raido (来堂 章太, Raidō Shōta)
Voiced by: Takuma Terashima (Japanese); Ben Balmaceda (English)
An expressionless male high school student with a tendency to overthink. He becomes Aharen's boyfriend. He is aware that he has a scary face, which led to him not being able to make friends during junior high. However, despite his face, he is a kind and considerate person who puts his family and friends above himself. After graduation, he becomes a novelist and participates in an expedition to Mars.
Mitsuki Oshiro (大城 みつき, Ōshiro Mitsuki)
Voiced by: M.A.O (Japanese); Kristen McGuire (English)
A tall high school girl who used to be in the same class as Reina and Riku during her elementary school years. Initially wary of Shota due to his scary face, she soon opens up to him after Reina tells her Raido's good points. She is very skilled in martial arts, hiding, surveillance, and beauty care. Her parents own a barbershop.
Ms. Tobaru (桃原先生, Tōbaru-sensei)
Voiced by: Kana Hanazawa (Japanese); Katelyn Barr (English)
A classical Japanese literature teacher who is also the main characters' homeroom teacher during their second year. She has a habit of getting a nosebleed whenever she looks at the Raido-Aharen couple because she sees them as "wholesome". She is best friends with Miyahira-sensei and usually spends much free time with her.
Ishikawa (石川)
Voiced by: Tetsuya Kakihara (Japanese); Kevin D. Thelwell (English)
Raido's classmate and friend, also Hanako's childhood friend. He is very popular among his peers, though he has an inferiority complex that causes him to be distant from Hanako. He calls Hanako "Hana-chan".
Hanako Sato (佐藤 ハナコ, Satō Hanako)
Voiced by: Tomori Kusunoki (Japanese); Veronica Laux (English)
Raido's classmate and friend, also Ishikawa's childhood friend. She is concerned about the distance between her and Ishikawa.
Ms. Miyahira (宮平先生, Miyahira-sensei)
Voiced by: Yurie Kozakai (Japanese); Tia Ballard (English)
A PE teacher and the main characters' homeroom teacher during their first-year. She is best friends with Tobaru-sensei but is concerned with her gluttony whenever they eat out together.
Raido's little sister (ライドウ妹, Raidō-imōto)
Voiced by: Rika Nagae (Japanese); Jalitza Delgado (English)
A middle school student who is friends with Eru. Despite her somewhat cold attitude towards her brother, she actually cares a lot for him.
Atsushi (あつし)
Voiced by: Natsumi Fujiwara (Japanese); Bryn Apprill (English)
A neighborhood boy who worships the Aharen siblings and believes that they are talented in sports and games, which may not necessarily be true. He, along with his friends, always badgers the Aharen siblings to teach them new games or play with them.
Futaba (ふたば)
Voiced by: Maria Sashide (Japanese); Jill Harris (English)
Atsushi's friend who is in love with him. She mistakenly believes the entire Aharen family to be her enemy because they are trying to steal Atsushi away from her. She is a tsundere to everyone, not just to Atsushi.
Ren Aharen (阿波連 れん, Aharen Ren)
Voiced by: Misaki Kuno (Japanese); Brittney Karbowski (English)
Reina's younger brother who is in elementary school. He likes dressing up as his sister, though this habit causes many misunderstandings among the characters.
Eru Aharen (阿波連 える, Aharen Eru)
Voiced by: Rina Hidaka (Japanese); Natalie Rose (English)
Reina's younger sister who is in junior high school. She is also friends with Raido's little sister, though ironically she is hostile towards Raido himself. This hostility is because Eru believes she cannot be Reina's number one and is always relying on her big sister. Though, over time, she seems to soften towards Raido when he continuously demonstrates his kindness towards everyone.
Ai Aharen (阿波連 あい, Aharen Ai)
Reina's mother. She approves of her daughter's relationship with Raido. She cares about her children a lot, and stops them from doing dangerous things. However, she herself tends to bite more than she can chew when she wants to try something new, such as skateboarding or card games.
Riku Tamanaha (玉那覇 りく, Tamanaha Riku)
Voiced by: Nao Tōyama (Japanese); Kara Edwards (English)
A gyaru transfer student who appears during the main characters' second year. Despite her appearances, she is a shy and introverted girl who just wants to make lasting friendships. She was also Reina and Mitsuki's classmate in elementary school, though she does not remember Mitsuki in particular because her family moved around many times.
Ms. Henzan (平安山先生, Henzan-sensei)
Voiced by: Iori Saeki (Japanese); Trisha Mellon (English)
An English teacher and the main characters' homeroom teacher in their final year of high school. She is a new teacher with a passion for education and uses the government curriculum guidelines to deal with the Shota-Reina couple, whom she mistakenly believes to be delinquents. Her notable feature is her double tooth.
Takashi (たかし, Takashi)
An elementary school student despite his gakuran, flashy hairstyle, and delinquent manner of speaking. After losing a duel to Shota in a park when Ren is playing, Takashi worships him as his "Master". He is actually a kind boy who follows rules and plays with his friends normally.

== Media ==
=== Manga ===
Written and illustrated by Asato Mizu, Aharen-san Is Indecipherable was serialized in Shueisha's Shōnen Jump+ service from January 29, 2017, to April 30, 2023. Seventeen tankōbon volumes were released from August 2017 to August 2023.

On May 28, 2025, Seven Seas Entertainment announced that they had licensed the series for English publication beginning in February 2026. The series is being released in 2-in-1 omnibus volumes.

No.	Original release date	Original ISBN	English release date	English ISBN
1	August 4, 2017	978-4-08-881090-4	February 10, 2026	979-8-89765-110-8
2	December 4, 2017	978-4-08-881301-1	February 10, 2026	979-8-89765-110-8
3	April 4, 2018	978-4-08-881396-7	June 16, 2026	979-8-89765-111-5
4	July 4, 2018	978-4-08-881525-1	June 16, 2026	979-8-89765-111-5
5	November 2, 2018	978-4-08-881635-7	October 20, 2026	979-8-89765-112-2
6	April 4, 2019	978-4-08-881805-4	October 20, 2026	979-8-89765-112-2
7	August 2, 2019	978-4-08-882023-1	—	—
8	January 4, 2020	978-4-08-882181-8	—	—
9	May 13, 2020	978-4-08-882287-7	—	—
10	October 2, 2020	978-4-08-882434-5	—	—
11	March 4, 2021	978-4-08-882563-2	—	—
12	August 4, 2021	978-4-08-882737-7	—	—
13	April 4, 2022	978-4-08-883075-9	—	—
14	June 3, 2022	978-4-08-883124-4	—	—
15	October 4, 2022	978-4-08-883276-0	—	—
16	April 4, 2023	978-4-08-883466-5	—	—
17	August 4, 2023	978-4-08-883611-9	—	—

=== Anime ===
An anime television series adaptation was announced on July 31, 2021. It is produced by Felix Film and was directed by Tomoe Makino, with Yasutaka Yamamoto serving as chief director, Takao Yoshioka overseeing the scripts, Yūko Yahiro designing the characters, and Satoru Kōsaki and Monaca composing the music. The series aired from April 2 to June 18, 2022, on the Animeism programming block on MBS, TBS, and BS-TBS. (Note: MBS and TBS listed the series premiere on April 1, 2022, at 26:25, which is effectively April 2 at 2:25 a.m. JST.) The opening theme song is "Hanarenai Kyori" (はなれない距離; Inseparable Distance), performed by TrySail, while the ending theme song is "Kyorikan" (キョリ感; A Sense of Distance) by HaKoniwalily. Crunchyroll streamed the series. On April 11, 2022, Crunchyroll announced that the series would receive an English dub, which premiered on April 15.

A second season was announced on August 4, 2024, with the staff and main cast returning to reprise their roles. The season aired from April 7 to June 23, 2025, on Tokyo MX and other networks. The opening theme song is "Warmthaholic" (微熱魔, Binetsuma), performed by Zutomayo, while the ending theme song is "Twilight" (トワイライト), performed by Shallm.

==== Episodes ====
===== Season 1 (2022) =====
No. overall	No. in season	Title (Note: All English titles are taken from Crunchyroll.)	Directed by (Note: Production staff information is taken from the ending credits of each episode.)	Written by	Storyboarded by	Original release date
1	1	"Isn't This Too Close?"; Transliteration: "Chika Sugi ja ne?" (Japanese: 近すぎじゃね？)	Tomoe Makino	Takao Yoshioka	Tomoe Makino	April 2, 2022
Raido begins his first year of high school. Due to possessing a naturally unfriendly face, he struggles to fit in and tries to become friends with Reina Aharen, who sits beside him in class. He is baffled when she either ignores him or speaks too softly to be heard. Aharen becomes extremely close to Raido after he retrieves her fallen eraser. Raido asks for an explanation of her behaviour, so she tells him she has a warped sense of distance which makes it difficult for her to judge when she is invading someone's personal space. When she stands too close she seems clingy, and when she stands too far away she appears anti-social, so she struggles to make friends. Initially Raido struggles to hear her when she speaks but eventually finds he is able to hear her better as he practice listening more sensitively to small noises. At an arcade, Aharen's warped sense of distance makes her an expert on claw machines, and wins many stuffed plushies from the game. She gives most of them to Raido, but accepts one from him. As time passes, Aharen keeps getting increasingly closer to Raido, even falling asleep on his lap after being exhausted from making him lunch in morning. At the same time, they are menacingly observed from afar by a girl.
2	2	"Are We Being Followed?"; Transliteration: "Tsukerareterun ja ne?" (Japanese: 尾行(つけ)られてるんじゃね？)	Shō Hamada	Ayumu Hisao	Saori Yamamoto	April 9, 2022
Aharen has something in her eye so Raido administers eye drops. Aharen claims having him close to her face is embarrassing, confusing Raido as she often comes closer on her own. Raido senses someone spying on them; it turns out to be Aharen's childhood friend Mitsuki Oshiro, a tall, nervous girl who cries a lot and doesn't trust boys. She declares she will protect Aharen, but from a distance to avoid Raido. Aharen tries to communicate to Raido his fly is down, but ultimately has to spend the day blocking his lower body from view when he does not understand her. Oshiro notices Aharen hasn't gone home and, suspecting she doesn't have an umbrella, tries to covertly give Aharen her own but is caught. She and Aharen share an umbrella, but due to their height difference Aharen still gets wet. She thanks Oshiro anyway, pointing out she knows Oshiro follows her and Raido home every day but isn't good at hiding. The next day, Oshiro watches Aharen from even further away using binoculars. Raido challenges Aharen to a game of Reversi. He realises with her unusual vision Aharen is actually a skilled Reversi player; he loses many times in a row, but calls a draw after the bell rings.
3	3	"We're Changing Seats, Huh?"; Transliteration: "Sekigae ja ne?" (Japanese: 席替えじゃね？)	Ken Andō	Kotsukotsu	Yoshihiro Takamoto	April 16, 2022 (Note: This episode aired at 2:40 a.m. JST, 15 minutes after the original air time on MBS.)
Aharen comes to school with bed head. Oshiro, whose family owns a hair salon, gives Aharen a haircut. She also cuts Raido's hair despite being tempted to shave him bald. Aharen is suffering from dry lips so Raido attempts to apply lip balm but messes up. Oshiro steps in again with makeup and a skin massage. Aharen later reveals she is stressed due to the growth spurt of the boy who sits in front of her, so now she can't see the chalkboard from her desk. Raido attempts several increasingly ludicrous methods of helping her but eventually just moves her desk closer to his own. A seat change is announced, meaning Raido and Aharen might no longer be sat next to each other. Deciding to do something nice for her, Raido tries to help her win at baseball, then cooks for her, in spite of his terrible food. He also helps her record them dancing together, believing she wants to be a U-Tube idol, though it turns out the dance was a class project. On seat moving day, Aharen hugs Raido as a goodbye, only to remain in the same place, as by chance they are reassigned their original seats beside each other.
4	4	"Isn't That Overdoing It?"; Transliteration: "Hamari Sugi ja ne?" (Japanese: ハマりすぎじゃね？)	Masahito Otani	Takao Yoshioka	Hatsuki Tsuji	April 23, 2022
Teacher Ms. Tobaru is obsessed with classical romance. She notices Aharen and Raido and determines they are tightly emotionally linked, and is so overcome by passion watching them causing her to faint. Aharen begins acting strangely, causing Raido to think she is demon-possessed, but she was really choking on food. Realizing he needs to understand her better, he tries to teach her facial expressions. Aharen discovers Japanese hip hop and quickly masters rapping everything she says. Raido also learns to rap and they begin communicating perfectly, until their microphones are confiscated, as they are banned in school. Raido's sister gives him a fidget spinner, which Aharen becomes obsessed with, teaching herself to perform tricks. Watching them, Ms. Tobaru faints again. In the park, Raido learns Aharen's spinner tricks have made her popular with children. One little girl named Futaba is jealous because her friend Akkun admires Aharen and challenges her to Reversi. Aharen lets Futaba win, but despite her victory, Akkun is mean to her. Aharen teaches him and asks him to apologize. Aharen is exhausted by the children and cannot walk, so she summons her giant dog, Nui, whom she rides back home.
5	5	"Isn't That a Little Too Heavy?"; Transliteration: "Futori Sugi ja ne?" (Japanese: 太りすぎじゃね？)	Yoshihisa Iida	Ayumu Hisao	Yoshihisa Iida	April 30, 2022
Aharen becomes obsessed with the game Hokkemon KO. Raido uses the strongest monster in the game, but is still defeated by Aharen's unassuming monster using superior strategy. At an arcade, Aharen sees Futaba attempting to win a stuffed toy for Akkun, so as to achieve his affection. She fails multiple times while Aharen wins several toys. Insisting on doing it herself, Futaba wins a toy on her last attempt. She later realises Aharen, by winning all the other toys, had been manoeuvring the toy into a better position for Futaba to get it. Aharen gives her toys to Raido, who adds them to his collection. Raido gains a lot of weight and Aharen worries it is because she gives him her lunch every day. Meanwhile Raido mistakenly thinks Aharen is worried about her own weight, and while researching proper diet and exercise routines, he ends up losing the weight overnight. Exams are soon and Raido has not been studying, so he asks for Aharen's help. They study together, determined in finishing in the top 100 in the rankings. After studying, Aharen hugs Raido, so glad she finally was able to help him for once. Thanks to their study sessions, Raido manages to place in the top 100 in the exam.
6	6	"Are We Too Good?"; Transliteration: "Tsuyo Sugi ja ne?" (Japanese: 強すぎじゃね？)	Takanori Yano	Kotsukotsu	Hirohide Shikishima	May 7, 2022
Since Aharen cannot swim, and Raido is not a strong swimmer either, they ask Oshiro to teach them. After grasping the basics, they decide to race in the pool. Aharen wins after discovering it is easier swimming underwater and she can hold her breath for an extraordinary length of time. They also compete at table tennis, tenpin bowling and basketball, though they are both so bad at sports that each game ends in a draw. They finally compete on an arcade shooting game, which Aharen wins due to her warped sense for distance allowing her to score perfect headshots. Aharen excuses herself to go to the bathroom, but when she returns, she suddenly begins acting strangely, and even has trouble winning toys on a crane game, requiring Raido to win one for her. Her continued odd behavior leads Raido to believe either she has sudden amnesia, or was replaced by a clone. The real Aharen suddenly appears, revealing the new Aharen is actually her little brother Ren, who bears a striking resemblance to her. Ren enjoyed playing a prank on Raido, but now returns home where it is revealed he enjoys dressing like a girl and often borrows Aharen's clothes.
7	7	"A Work of Art, Isn't It?"; Transliteration: "Geijutsu ja ne?" (Japanese: 芸術じゃね？)	Yūta Takamura	Takao Yoshioka	Saori Yamamoto	May 14, 2022
Aharen forgets her lunch and decides to shop at the school cafeteria. Aharen ends up crowd surfing over the mob of hungry students, only managing to buy one bun which Raido trades for his own lunch. Aharen's dog Nui appears with her lunch which she trades for Raido's despite him struggling with her massive portions. Aharen and Raido play old maid and Raido loses every game. After falling asleep in class Aharen refuses to move to their next class. Raido believes she is becoming a delinquent, though it turns out her legs went numb while sleeping. At the park Futaba refuses to believe Aharen's massive lunch is for only one person and accuses her of trying to seduce Akkun with food, though when she finds Aharen's cooking is superior to her own she asks Aharen for help making a bento. The next day Futaba accuses Aharen of poisoning the bento and making Akkun ill, until Raido points out she forgot to refrigerate it overnight, allowing it to spoil. With an art project due Aharen somehow produces a life size doll of herself so realistic it actually looks like her twin sister. She gives the doll to Raido to add to his collection of toys she won for him. It is so lifelike Raido struggles to sleep with it staring at him.
8	8	"Time for the Summer Festival, Huh?"; Transliteration: "Natsumatsuri ja ne?" (Japanese: 夏祭りじゃね？)	Ken Andō	Ayumu Hisao	Tomoe Makino	May 21, 2022
Ms. Miyahira invites Tobaru for lunch at the rooftop. However, they are soon joined by Raido, Aharen, and Oshiro, and seeing Oshiro's desire to sit close to them, Tobaru has trouble controlling herself. She struggles even further when Raido and Aharen feed Oshiro and sit close to her. She finally collapses when she visualizes them as a family. That night, Tobaru imagines improbable romantic scenarios between Raido and Aharen to prepare, but faints again, with Miyahira finding her unconscious. The next day, Ishikawa and Sato invite Aharen, Raido, and Oshiro to the summer festival. They spread themselves by abilities to win the most prices possible. After playing some games, Aharen and Raido realize they've lost each other. Raido is approached by Futaba, who mistakes him for her father. After he reunites her with her father, Futaba finally thanks Raido, albeit inaudibly. Aharen appears beside Raido, thanking him for finding her. They watch the fireworks, as Aharen tells Raido it is the first time she sees them in full view, as her small stature hindered her. Raido decides to meet back with the group, and offers his hand to Aharen to take her there. She accepts it, blushing profusely.
9	9	"I'm Sick, Huh?"; Transliteration: "Kaze ja ne?" (Japanese: 風邪じゃね？)	Susumu Yamamoto	Kotsukotsu	Yoshihiro Takamoto	May 28, 2022
Raido assumes a seductive, handsome appearance when he suffers from a fever. His reddened face flatters his friends, especially Aharen. Tobaru has a relapse when she sees Raido in this state. They all rush to his aid when he collapses. At home, Raido's sister is uncharacteristically friendly with him. The next day, everything goes back to normal after Raido recovers. At the market, Raido meets with Aharen's cold younger sister, Eru, as she is shopping for their dinner. She explains Aharen's dependency on her, and how much she talks about him. They go to the arcade, where Raido wins a special edition plushie after Eru failed to get it. She tells Raido to hand over the food and plushie to Aharen himself. However, as he arrives, he declares it was all Eru's idea, and Aharen hugs her sister, thanking her for her help. While bathing with Ren, Eru discusses Aharen's closeness to Raido, and they debate if they are dating. The next day, Raido comes across Ren, and helps him shop at the supermarket. He guides Ren after he lost his wallet, as Ren asks him if Aharen is his girlfriend. Aharen and Nui then arrive with the wallet, and after Raido calls Aharen by her first name, she becomes embarrassed.
10	10	"We're Camping, Huh?"; Transliteration: "Kyanpu ja ne?" (Japanese: キャンプじゃね？)	Tomoe Makino; Takanori Yano	Takao Yoshioka	Yasutaka Yamamoto; Saori Yamamoto	June 4, 2022
Ishikawa proposes to go camping, and all his friends agree. Miyahira takes them all to the camping site, where Aharen realizes she forgot to pack the food. Upset, she apologizes to her friends, but Raido gets authorized by the camp groundskeeper to pick food from the forest. As such, they all scatter around looking for things to eat. While spearfishing in a creek, Raido is joined by Oshiro. She tells him while she is jealous of the time he spends with Aharen, she has realized he is not a bad person. At night, Ishikawa proposes to go on an adventure. However, they ditch Aharen and Raido, trying to get them together. While stargazing, Aharen attempts to confess to Raido, but she is interrupted by an arriving Nui. Back in their tent, Aharen tells Oshiro she wishes to confess to Raido, and Oshiro surprisingly supports her. Aharen meets with Raido outside, where she kisses him, but runs back to her tent embarrassed, leaving Raido speechless. In school, Ishikawa and Sato wonder if they managed to connect. However, after seeing them act like usual, they conclude things are still the same. As she walks home with Tobaru, Miyahira notes something feels different about them.
11	11	"It Snowed, Huh?"; Transliteration: "Yuki ja ne?" (Japanese: 雪じゃね？)	Hiroshi Tamada	Kotsukotsu	Yoshihisa Iida	June 11, 2022
Aharen has created a café out of snow, and invites Raido inside. After classes, they discover the café has collapsed, so they rebuild it. Afterwards, Raido warms Aharen's hands with his own, embarrassing her. The next day, Raido accompanies Aharen to the nurse office to help her stretch out. After finishing, Raido ends up falling asleep. Aharen goes in for a kiss, but they are interrupted by the nurse. After school, Ishikawa and Sato continue studying Aharen for signs she is dating Raido. However, while Aharen sleeps and Raido is away, Ishikawa and Sato flirt. The next day, Aharen meets up with Raido at the mall, where she tells him her family will do a New Year's meal, and invites him to attend. After hanging out, they come across Futaba and Akkun. Seeing Raido so close to Aharen, Akkun challenges him in the Blade Spinner tournament in the mall. While Raido and Akkun both lose, Aharen and Futaba emerge as champions in their divisions, earning Futaba Akkun's admiration. After Futaba points out Aharen and Raido's activities resemble a date, Aharen gets embarrassed. Absent this whole time, it is revealed Oshiro is undertaking swordsman training to challenge someone.
12	12	"This Is a Duel, Huh?"; Transliteration: "Hatashiai ja ne?" (Japanese: 果たし合いじゃね？)	Naoki Murata; Tomoe Makino	Takao Yoshioka	Tomoe Makino	June 18, 2022
In a flashback showing while Raido was away, Oshiro asked Aharen if she and Raido were dating, but Aharen denied it. Believing Raido rejected Aharen, Oshiro began her training, wanting to make him pay. In the present, Raido follows Oshiro's note and gets challenged to a duel in Reversi. As they play, Oshiro remembers when she met Aharen back in middle school. She says since he does not reciprocate Aharen's feelings, he will stop seeing her when she wins. Raido then cuts her lead, and explains at the campsite, Aharen was unable to confess, but he did tell her he liked her. This stuns an arriving Aharen, who explains how happy she was when Raido confessed. Oshiro apologizes, and Aharen finally tells Raido she likes him too, and, alongside Ishikawa and Sato, they all embrace. Sometime later, Raido discovers Aharen's secret lupinus garden, and they begin tending it together. Aharen then invites their friends, Miyahira, and Tobaru to a tea party, where they reflect on the approaching second year. Aharen says she is scared they might be separated, but Raido assures he and their friends will be there for her, as they observe their bloomed lupinus garden while holding hands.

===== Season 2 (2025) =====
No. overall	No. in season	Title	Directed by	Written by	Storyboarded by	Original release date
13	1	"A Transfer Student, Huh?"; Transliteration: "Tenkōsei ja ne?" (Japanese: 転校生じゃね？)	Tomoe Makino	Takao Yoshioka	Tomoe Makino	April 7, 2025
Now in their second year Aharen and Raido are dating and are once again sat next to each other. Ishikawa, Sato and Oshiro are also in their class with Tobaru as homeroom teacher. Aharen struggles with fatigue and Raido wonders if maybe Aharen has been in hibernation preparing for a growth spurt, but it turns out she was just tired from waking up early. Aharen becomes cold so Raido keeps her warm inside his jacket, giving Tobaru her first fainting spell of the year. Gyaru student Riku transfers into their class, and Raido worries she might be planning to bully Aharen. However, Riku is revealed to be a socially insecure introvert, with pictures showing she knew Aharen in elementary school. Riku enthusiastically takes Aharen out to have fun, but worries she might have come on too strong, and is much quieter the next day. Aharen meanwhile fears she pushed Riku away by acting aloof. She explains to Riku she had a friend whom she got too close to too quickly and ended up ruining their friendship, so Riku reveals she was that friend. With the misunderstanding cleared up they become friends again. Oshiro also remembers Riku, except Riku has no idea who she is and has to remind herself by studying her old photos again. Riku is suspicious of Raido and treats him like a threat, until she realises he is Aharen's boyfriend and runs away having embarrassed herself again.
14	2	"Kinda Grainy, Huh?"; Transliteration: "Tsubutsubu ja ne?" (Japanese: つぶつぶじゃね？)	Yasutaka Yamamoto, Tomoe Makino	Gotsugotsu	Yasutaka Yamamoto, Saori Yamamoto	April 14, 2025
Raido begins playing the game Grainy Crossing (おまつれ つぶつぶの杜, Omatsure Tsubutsubu no Mori; lit. 'Grainy Forest') which entails building a village by farming, gathering, hunting and fishing alongside the talking Tom Grainook (つぶたぬ, Tsubutanu). Raido plays so obsessively he ends up running his own city as a yakuza boss with Tom as his lieutenant. One day, Tom protects Raido from an assassination with his life. After visiting Tom's grave, Raido remembers Aharen plays Grainy Crossing and decides to visit her village. There, he finds Aharen also runs a large city, only everyone is prosperous, whereas Raido's city had been built to cater only to his desires. The attention to detail is so great Raido wonders if Aharen is planning to replace the real world with a virtual reality world and live there permanently. Aharen shows up to school as normal and reveals she shares her Grainy Crossing account with Ren, who did most of the work himself. The next day Raido accidentally drinks amazake at breakfast and develops an aggressively masculine personality due to being drunk. As a result no one at school knows how to deal with Raido, especially Aharen who finds she likes it, as does a mortified Eru. However, returning home Raido realises the amazake was actually non-alcoholic and abruptly returns to normal. Later, Raido's sister meets Eru and is surprised so many people think of Raido as kind and reliable, when she can only see him as her weird older brother.
15	3	"The Athletics Festival, Huh?"; Transliteration: "Taiikumatsuri ja ne?" (Japanese: 体育祭じゃね？)	Naoki Murata	Masanao Akahoshi	Hidetoshi Namura	April 21, 2025
Raido unwittingly rips the back of his trousers, exposing his cat-themed underwear. Aharen can't find the words to tell him so she goes to comical extremes to hide the rip from everyone at school until she finds the opportunity to quickly sew it up. Raido, still unaware of the rip, assumes Aharen was spanking him for something he did wrong. At the athletics festival Aharen is chosen for the relay. Not wanting to hold them back Aharen trains with Raido and is happy her speed improves. Unfortunately, Ishikawa sprains his ankle and is replaced by Raido. After her turn Aharen is glad that while she didn't overtake anyone in front of her, no one behind her overtook her either. As the last runner of the relay Raido manages to overtake the other runners and claim victory. Tobaru passes out when Aharen proudly hugs Raido for winning. Oshiro consoles Ishikawa for not being able to take part. Riku feels excluded from everyone else celebrating but Ishikawa unwittingly makes her feel better just by talking to her. While out shopping Riku encounters Ren and decides to become friends with him so she can be better friends with Aharen. Unfortunately, as an introvert she struggles to relate to the outgoing Ren and ends up getting advice from him about how to communicate. Unfortunately, when Aharen appears Riku feels overwhelmed and runs away again.
16	4	"An Idol, Huh?"; Transliteration: "Aidoru ja ne?" (Japanese: アイドルじゃね？)	Naoki Murata	Takao Yoshioka	Chihiro Kumano	April 28, 2025
Aharen tries gyaru fashion with Riku's help. Raido believes Aharen might be attempting a form of personal growth, so he adopts a radical personality to support her. Tobaru cannot handle the sight and runs away. Aharen and Raido return to normal the next day. Aharen introduces Raido to the arcade game Primitive Planet, or PriPla (プリプラ, PuriPura), which allows the player to dress characters in idol outfits and perform songs. Aharen and Raido are soon obsessed, watching the anime and attending the live concerts, until the arcade replaces the game with the next in the series, PriGachi (メッチャプリガチ, Metcha PuriGachi). Raido is depressed at losing his favourite character Rai-chan but switches to a similar character, Ido-chan, in PriGachi. After several weeks Raido is shocked when the arcade returns PriPla by popular demand. Unable to choose between Rai and Ido, Raido plays both games but quickly runs out of money so he can't play either. He notices Aharen writing song lyrics and sewing dresses and assumes she is planning to become an idol herself. However, it turns out she was only planning a performance with Ren and Eru for the local festival. The next day Aharen attends school in a mask so Raido assumes she is hiding her identity due to becoming an idol overnight. Fortunately, Aharen explains she just hurt her voice singing and has no plans to perform again.
17	5	"Going Swimming, Huh?"; Transliteration: "Kaisuiyoku ja ne?" (Japanese: 海水浴じゃね？)	Yū Yabuuchi	Gotsugotsu	Hidetoshi Namura	May 5, 2025
Everyone decides to go to the beach, with Ishikawa suggesting a trip to an island that happens to have a legend wherein couples that watch the sunset stay together forever. Riku is especially glad to be included as she has never been invited anywhere before. Aharen is afraid Raido's opinion of her might change if he sees her in a swimsuit, but Sato reassures her. On the island Raido complements Aharen's bikini, making her blush. Ishikawa also comments Sato is particularly cute in her bikini. Unfortunately, it becomes cloudy, disappointing Raido and Aharen they won't see the sunset. Ishikawa accidentally messes up the schedule so they miss the boat, forcing them to spend the night on the island. Raido decides to help them survive the hostile wilderness, until Ishikawa reminds him the island has a town, shops and hotel. Aharen is glad Raido liked her bikini and thanks Sato for helping her be confident. Sato meanwhile contemplates that Ishikawa has been calling her cute since childhood yet feels like she doesn't deserve it. Having missed the sunset Raido invites Aharen to watch the sunrise instead, confirming his desire to stay with her forever. The boat arrives but everyone impulsively decides to have another day at the beach, terrifying Riku who is already in trouble with her strict mother for staying overnight without permission.
18	6	"Running Away from Home, Huh?"; Transliteration: "Iede ja ne?" (Japanese: 家出じゃね？)	Naoki Murata	Masanao Akahoshi	Takeshi Fujioka	May 12, 2025
Futaba catches Akkun playing with Riku, so she decides Riku is her enemy. The next day she sees Akkun with Ren and decides Ren is also her enemy. Eru passes by and Akkun asks her to teach him to skateboard. Eru asks Aharen to teach her to skateboard so she can teach Akkun, but Akkun quickly loses interest in skateboarding and begins playing cat's cradle. Eru ends up teaching Akkun and Futaba how to cat's cradle, so Futaba decides they are friends now. However, when Akkun switches to skipping rope he and Eru become tangled together, so Futaba decides Eru is her enemy after all. Seeing how Aharen looks after them Eru and Ren decide to cook dinner for her. Ren asks Raido for advice, causing a fight between him and Eru who doesn't like Raido. After Ren runs away crying Eru admits to Raido she is jealous he has become Reina's favourite person. Raido points out it is impossible to replace her as Aharen's sister. They return to Aharen and find Ren is still missing, making Eru feel guilty. Riku spots Ren and he tells her everything. Riku convinces him to go home and fix things. Ren apologises to Eru and together they cook Aharen dinner and tell her she doesn't need to look after them as much now they are older. Ren also reveals he bought pudding for Eru for looking after him too.
19	7	"A Class Trip, Huh?"; Transliteration: "Shūgakuryokō ja ne?" (Japanese: 修学旅行じゃね？)	Yū Yabuuchi	Masanao Akahoshi	Hidetoshi Namura	May 19, 2025
Tobaru announces a class trip to Tokyo. As they must form groups of five, Riku fears being left out as she is the newest of Aharen's friends. Fortunately, Ishikawa has many friends and joins another group. Sato is seemingly dissatisfied not to be in the same group as Ishikawa. Raido suggests visiting Tokyo's theme park DenisySea. On the plane Raido discovers he has a phobia of flying so Aharen holds his hand, giving Tobaru a nosebleed. Arriving at DenisySea Raido realises he left his ticket at the hotel and retrieving it means he will miss the DenisySea parade with Aharen. He finds his ticket but his return train is cancelled, upsetting Aharen he will miss even more of their trip. Tobaru and Miyahira hire a car and drive him there. Not wanting to waste more time Aharen and Raido leave the others behind so they can quickly see as much of DenisySea as possible before it closes. Returning home Raido gives his sister the souvenir she wanted, a teddy bear of DenisySea's mascot Mutchi Moose. She is so happy she runs away, leading Raido to believe he somehow upset her. Meanwhile, Riku feels guilty she accidentally made Raido feel bad for forgetting his ticket and spends all day mentally preparing to apologise, only to find Raido had already forgotten about it.
20	8	"Christmas, Huh?"; Transliteration: "Kurisumasu ja ne?" (Japanese: クリスマスじゃね？)	Naoki Murata	Takao Yoshioka	Yoshihisa Iida	May 26, 2025
Ren tells Raido it is Aharen's birthday, so Raido asks people for gift ideas, but Oshiro thinks he is confessing and Riku thinks he is threatening her. In the end he simply asks Aharen what she wants. Aharen requests a party with her friends which she reveals is also a surprise party for him as they share the same birthday. By bizarre coincidence they gift each other identical life-sized Raido dolls. Raido discovers his middle school diary and decides to start an exchange-diary between himself and Aharen. Their entries become increasingly ludicrous until Aharen draws a picture of apple trees, which Raido misinterprets as a demonic ritual. He decides to support Aharen in worshipping the devil, only to discover Aharen accidentally gave him Ren's homework and the picture is meaningless. Raido asks to spend Christmas Day alone with Aharen. Unfortunately they return home early when Aharen develops a fever. In her bedroom a delirious Aharen mistakes Raido for the Raido doll and clings to him just as her mother Ai gets home. Raido manages to escape Aharen's clutches and avoid a misunderstanding. Ai mentions Aharen is planning to attend college, possibly in another city. Raido is determined he and Aharen will stay together even if their plans separate them for a while. Aharen apologises for hiding her college plans but explains their exchange-diary inspired her to become an art teacher.
21	9	"It's a Battle, Huh?"; Transliteration: "Taiketsu ja ne?" (Japanese: 対決じゃね？)	Yasuhira Kido, Shinya Kawabe	Masanao Akahoshi	Hatsuki Tsuji	June 2, 2025
Raido and Aharen begin their third year with a new homeroom teacher, Henzan, a passionate first-time teacher who believes the school curriculum has the answers for any scenario. Having met Tobaru she has misunderstood Raido and Aharen to be violent delinquents, for which she cannot find solutions anywhere in the curriculum. Tobaru advises Henzan to stop overthinking it. Henzan becomes wary of Oshiro, having deduced from her boxing she is also a delinquent. During career advice day she is able to advise Oshiro about attending an overseas college, but when she sees Aharen comfort a crying Oshiro she feels pain in her chest and deduces Oshiro put poison in her tea. Later, Oshiro is confronted by Aragaki, a girl she defeated in a karate tournament. Aragaki is furious Oshiro has avoided their rematch by not competing this year. Oshiro reveals she quit karate because it was obvious Aragaki would soon surpass her, while her own progress had stalled at its current level. Instead, she is focusing on getting into beauty school. Aragaki demands a rematch, which she loses, and runs off happy she still has room to improve. Oshiro admits her primary dream is to style Aharen's hair on her wedding day, making Aharen blush. Oshiro is suddenly confronted by more girls demanding rematches in kendo, boxing, judo, swimming and fencing.
22	10	"A Musical, Huh?"; Transliteration: "Myūjikaru ja ne?" (Japanese: ミュージカルじゃね？)	Tomoe Makino	Tomoe Makino	Hatsuki Tsuji	June 9, 2025
After helping Ren practise for his school's musical play Aharen begins singing everything she says. Believing this to be another method of overcoming her quiet voice Raido also begins singing everything. As they become more dramatic Aharen and Raido soon embody the spirit of classical noble lovers, with the entire school singing along, except for Riku who believes they have gone insane. Tobaru and Henzan both pass out from a nosebleed and chest pain. The drama lasts all the way to Raido's home where he is finally snapped out of it by his sister yelling at him for stealing her pudding. With exams approaching Riku tries to get closer to everyone by suggesting an after school study session. However, everyone spends their time studying, giving her no chance to talk to anyone. Noticing her predicament Ishikawa suggests a break to play The Game of Life. After an intense game Aharen accumulates ¥100 million from steady work and smart investments, whereas Raido tries to win by gambling and ends up ¥120 million in debt. Sato takes the opportunity to be alone with Ishikawa by getting snacks from the store. Impulsively she confesses to him but isn't surprised when he rejects her, so she asks if they can stay normal friends. Distracted by snacks and drinks everyone realises they have lost their study motivation and spend the rest of the session having fun, to Riku's delight.
23	11	"The Culture Festival, Huh?"; Transliteration: "Bunkamatsuri ja ne?" (Japanese: 文化祭じゃね？)	Shinya Kawabe	Gotsugotsu	Chihiro Kumano	June 16, 2025
Everyone is thinking about future careers but all Raido can envision is supporting Aharen. Raido reads his diaries to see if his childhood dreams have potential. Unfortunately he tries and fails at everything. For the school's cultural festival, the class decide to run a café. As Aharen is skilled at art she is made creative director with Raido suggesting it be practice for teaching. Aharen is soon so busy she and Raido barely talk. Ishikawa asks Raido about this and he admits he realised his life revolves around Aharen, so he has been distancing from her to consider his future. Raido writes his thoughts in their diary but decides not to show Aharen yet. Aharen finds the diary by accident and is shocked. The festival arrives but Aharen skips school, with Raido seeing her on a bus. It is revealed Aharen fell asleep on the bus and ended up at the beach, mad at herself for missing the café. Raido arrives and reassures her the café is fine thanks to the work she already did. Aharen reveals she read the diary in which Raido wished he could be more like her, so she apologises for making him feel bad about himself. Raido explains it meant he respects everything about her, and while he has no idea about his future he still wants to support her here in the present. With the festival over Aharen reveals she made a video of all the pictures people have been taking of their class as a reminder not to forget the time they spent together.
24	12	"Seriously, Isn't This Too Close?"; Transliteration: "Yappari Chika Sugi ja ne?" (Japanese: やっぱり近すぎじゃね？)	Naoki Murata	Takao Yoshioka	Tomoe Makino	June 23, 2025
In the future a child named Madoka finds the exchange diary and asks her Grandma Aharen about it. Grandma Aharen reminisces that five years after graduating high school Raido became a trainee teacher under Tobaru. On Raido's first day Aharen surprises him by revealing she also got a job at the school as art teacher. As they had separated after high school they had not seen each other in five years, their reunion causing both Tobaru and Henzan to pass out. Grandma Aharen further recalls that on the day they graduated she decided to break up with Raido so there would be nothing distracting him from finding his future. Raido claimed without her he would no longer have a reason to push himself forward, so he agreed to separate but asks that if they meet again they get married. Aharen quickly agrees. Five years later, after making Raido and Aharen's wedding video for their reception, Ishikawa proposes marriage to Sato, who was surprised it took him so long. Oshiro, who now owns her own salon, achieves her dream of styling Aharen's hair on her wedding day, and with their friends and family watching Aharen and Raido finally got married. Grandma Aharen regrets Raido can only watch her from very far away, having become an astronaut on a mission to Mars, following his earlier careers as a teacher, property inspector and book author. Madoka asks what first made her fall in love with Raido, and Grandma Aharen recalls it happened the day they met when he tried his hardest to understand what she was saying.

== See also ==
- Blue Archive: The Grand Adventure of the Game Development Department – Another manga series by the same author
- Denkigai no Honya-san – Another manga series by the same author
