= Yoko Maekawa =

Japanese singer (born 1950)

Yōko Maekawa (前川 陽子, Maekawa Yōko)
- Born: 前川 陽子; December 18, 1950 (age 75); Osaka Prefecture, Japan
- Education: Faculty of Letters, Atomi University
- Genres: Anison; jazz
- Occupations: Singer
- Works: Albums; singles; songs
- Years active: 1963–present
- Label: Gourd Records Ltd. MGC
- Website: Yōko Maekawa Official Website (in Japanese)

Yōko Maekawa (前川 陽子, Maekawa Yōko) is a Japanese singer and jazz singer born in Osaka Prefecture, Japan. She graduated from the Faculty of Letters at Atomi University.

She is best known for performing various anison songs, particularly the opening for Cutie Honey. In 2008, she rerecorded the openings for Cutie Honey and Megu the Little Witch, titling them "21st century" versions. The Cutie Honey opening was originally intended to be performed by Linda Yamamoto.

At NHK, she is known as one of the "Four Heavenly Kings of Anime Songs" along with Mitsuko Horie, Isao Sasaki and Ichirou Mizuki. She is also widely hailed as "the Goddess of Magical Girl Songs".

== History ==
Born on December 18, 1950 in Osaka Prefecture and raised in Saga Prefecture, Maekawa was a graduate of the Toei Children's Theater Training Institute.

During her first year at Nerima Municipal Nerima Junior High School, her ability to sing with her beautiful voice grabbed the attention of Seiichiro Uno, which lead to her debut as a singer. The very first singing performance she did was for "Hyokkori Hyoutan-jima", the opening theme song of the NHK puppet show Hyokkori Hyoutan-jima. At the time, it was customary for kids program theme songs to be sung by either a children's choir or vocal group, so Maekawa became Japan's first solo artist who specialized in Japanese anime and children's programs.

She went on to sing nearly over a thousand songs, including the Sally the Witch and Princess Knight theme songs, as well as commercial jingles for Kappa Ebisen.

At a certain period of time, she was part of Young Fresh, as her vocals can be heard with the group in songs like Ninja Akakage and Gokū no Daibōken. Wishing to study music in earnest at university, she decided to take a hiatus, which lasted from the late 1960s to the early 1970s.

In 1973, she returned to singing with performing "Cutie Honey", the opening theme song for Cutie Honey. The song's combination of its sexy lyrics with Maekawa's powerful vocals left a massive impact to those who heard it.

Takeo Watanabe, composer of the Cutie Honey opening theme song, took a huge liking towards Maekawa's singing, so composed the Megu the Little Witch opening and ending themes with the intention of having her perform them.

In her own words, "for personal reasons", and after taking a few years off of doing singing work in order to marry and raise her children, made a comeback with Asari-chan.

After taking yet another extensive break, she returned again in 2001 as a jazz singer. In recent years, Maekawa has made multiple public appearances at anime-related events, such as the Tokyo Anime Awards Festival 2017, where she and voice actress Eiko Masuyama were awarded the "Anime Achievement Award" that year for their many contributions to the indutsry.

== Discography ==
=== Anime and tokusatsu ===
- Hyokkori Hyoutan-jima (Hyokkori Hyoutan-jima OP, 1964)
- Wonderful Lilly (Rainbow Sentai Robin ED 2)
- Princess Knight (Princess Knight OP, 1967)
- Princess March (Princess Knight ED, 1967)
- Ninja Hattori-kun (Ninja Hattori-kun OP, 1966)
- Along With the Wind (Pyunpyun Maru ED, 1967)
- Magic of Mambo (Sally the Witch ED, 1967)
- Ninja Hattori-kun (Ninja Hattori-kun + Ninja Monster Jippou OP, 1967)
- Piggyback Ghost (Piggyback Ghost OP, 1972)
- Cutie Honey (Cutie Honey OP, 1973)
- Night Fog of Honey (Cutie Honey ED, 1973)
- Megu the Little Witch (Megu the Little Witch OP, 1974)
- Megu is All Alone (Megu the Little Witch ED, 1974)
- Pearl Colored Waltz (Maya the Bee ED 2, 1975)
- That Was the Beginning (J.A.K.Q. Dengekitai Insert song, 1977)
- That Child Asari-chan (Asari-chan OP, 1982)
- I'm a Girl (Asari-chan ED, 1982)

=== Kayōkyoku ===
- Dark Sunset (Victor SV-692, April 1968)
- Sunset on the Shore (Victor SV-820, 1969)

=== Commercial jingle ===
- Kappa Ebisen (Calbee)
- Electric Rice Cooker: Freshly Cooked (Tiger Corporation)
- House Tamagomen (House Foods: Parody song of Go For It! Akadō Suzunosuke)
- Ajinomoto of the World (Ajinomoto)
- Kirin Tanrei Green Label (Kirin Company)
- Nivea Body Milk (Kao Corporation)

and many others

=== Kikaku-kyoku ===
- Momo the Caterpillar (From "Pakupaku Pocket Records", a children's record series by Yū Aku and Nippon Columbia, 1977)
  - Was included on the B-side of "Sensei from Akita". Although a song with the same title by Kimihiko Satō was in Hirake! Ponkikki, this is a different song with the same title.
- Let's Wash Our Hands with Soap I (Hey! Let's Wash Our Hands with Soap) (Performed with Honey Knights, recorded on flexi-disc, and distributed to elementary schools by the Handwashing Promotion Headquarters.)
  - Included on "Scat, Bossa & Singing Instrumental: Hidehiko Arashino CM Works (Original Recording, Remastered)", released in 2011.
- Matsumoto Bon Bon (Music: Tadatoshi Miyagawa, Lyrics: Hiroshi Ueno, Choreography: Nishida Takashi, 1975)

== Albums ==
- CUTE JAZZ (Gourd Records, October 2, 2003)
- Hyokkori Hyoutan-jima Another World (Gourd Records, October 2, 2003)
- LOVE (Gourd Records, April 29, 2005)
- VINTAGE BLUE (Gourd Records, May 30, 2011)
- Yōko Maekawa: Super Best: Cutie Honey / Hyokkori Hyoutan-jima (July 20, 2005)
- Cutie Honey (21st century ver.) (Team Entertainment, February 27, 2008)

== Related topics ==
- Takeo Watanabe
- Seiichiro Uno

== Reference ==
- "Gendai Net" (『ゲンダイネット』), October 1, 2006 (from Nikkan Gendai, September 28)
