= Fuyumi Shiraishi =

Japanese actress, voice actress, and narrator (1936–2019)

- 白石 冬美
- Born: 白石 芙美子 (Fumiko Shiraishi); 14 October 1936; Peking, Republic of China
- Died: 26 March 2019 (aged 82); Setagaya, Tokyo, Japan
- Occupations: Actress; voice actress; narrator
- Years active: 1963–2019
- Agent: Ken Production

Fuyumi Shiraishi (白石冬美, Shiraishi Fuyumi; 14 October 1936 – 26 March 2019) was a Japanese actress, voice actress and narrator.

== Career ==
Fuyumi was previously affiliated with Aoni Production and after she left Aoni and joined Ken Production founded by the late Kenji Utsumi until the time of her death.

== Death ==
Shiraishi died on March 26, 2019, of ischemic heart failure at her Setagaya home at the age of 82.

== Filmography ==
=== Television animation ===
- Big X (1964) (Nina Belton)
- Wonder Three (1965) (Bokko)
- Osomatsu-kun (1966) (Karamatsu)
- Sally, the Witch (1966) (Poron)
- Perman (1967) (Perman #5/Pābō)
- Cyborg 009 (1968) (Ivan Whiskey/001)
- Kaibutsu-kun (1968) (Tarou Kaibutsu)
- Kyojin no Hoshi (1968) and Shin Kyojin no Hoshi (1977) (Akiko Hoshi)
- Ashita no Joe (1970) (Sachi)
- Ultraman Leo (1974) (Taishoh)
- Mobile Suit Gundam (1979–1980) (Mirai Yashima, Katz Kobayashi)
- Hana no Ko Lunlun (1979) (Katy)
- Space Runaway Ideon (1980–1981) (Kasha Imhof)
- Maeterlinck's Blue Bird: Tyltyl and Mytyl's Adventurous Journey (1980) (Shanet the cat)
- Ashita no Joe 2 (1980) (Sachi)
- Honey Honey no Suteki na Bouken (1981–1982) (Princess Flora)
- Boku Patalliro! (1982) (Patalliro)
- Eagle Sam (1983–1984) (Guzuran)
- Mobile Suit Zeta Gundam (1985) (Mirai Noa)
- Obake no Q-Tarō (1985) (Doronpa)
- Dororonpa! (1991) (Komachi Ono)
- Ojarumaru (1998) (Hanajitsu)
- Nichijou (2011) (Ball of mud / Steel ball)
- Space Dandy (2014) (Yoko)

=== Original video animation (OVA) ===
- Giant Robo (1992) (Sanny the Magician)

=== Theatrical animation ===
- Mobile Suit Gundam: Char's Counterattack (1988) (Mirai Yashima)

=== Video games ===
- Tengai Makyō II: Manjimaru (1992) (Omil)
- Panic! (1993) (Slap)

== Awards ==
Year	Award	Category	Result
2015	9th Seiyu Awards	Achievement Award	Won
