= Asari-chan =

Japanese manga series

- Cover of the first tankōbon volume, featuring Asari

あさりちゃん
- Genre: Comedy
- Manga
- Written by: Mayumi Muroyama
- Published by: Shogakukan
- Magazine: Shōgaku Ninensei
- Original run: 1978 – 2014
- Volumes: 100
- Anime television series
- Directed by: Osamu Kasai
- Produced by: Morihiro Kato (TV Asahi)
- Music by: Hiroshi Tsutsui
- Studio: Toei Animation
- Original network: ANN (TV Asahi)
- Original run: January 25, 1982 – February 28, 1983
- Episodes: 54
- Anime film

Asari-chan Ai no Marchen Shōjo
- Directed by: Kazumi Fukushima
- Written by: Tadaaki Yamazaki
- Music by: Hiroshi Tsutui
- Studio: Toei Animation
- Released: March 13, 1982
- Runtime: 25 minutes

Asari-chan (あさりちゃん) is a Japanese shōjo slice of life manga series by Mayumi Muroyama. With a total circulation of 28 million copies, it is one of the best-selling manga. It was adapted into an anime television series and an anime film. The TV series was produced by Toei Animation, and directed by Kazumi Fukushima.

== Plot ==
The anime follows Asari, a normal but dimwitted elementary school fourth-grade girl who does not get along with her family.

== Manga ==
The manga was written by Mayumi Muroyama and serialized from the August 1978 issue to the March 2014 issue of Shogakukan's Shogaku Ninensei magazine. During its serialization it was also published in several other Shogakukan magazines, including CoroCoro Comic, Pyonpyon, Ciao, Shogaku Ichinensei, Shogaku Sannensei, Shogaku Yonnensei, and Shogaku Gonensei.

== Anime ==
The anime was produced by Toei Animation a subsidiary of Toei Company and directed by Kazumi Fukushima. It was first broadcast in Japan on 25 January 1982, with the last farewell final episode broadcast on 28 February 1983. It was broadcast every Monday at 19:00 until 19:30 JST, with 54 episodes. The opening theme is Ano ko wa Asari-chan (あの子はあさりちゃん) by Yoko Maekawa and the ending theme is Watashi wa Onna no ko (私は女の子) also by Maekawa.

=== Voice Cast ===
- Katsue Miwa as Asari Hamano
- Chiyoko Kawashima as Tatami Hamano
- Kei Tomiyama as Papa
- Mariko Mukai as Mama
- Fuyumi Shiraishi as Morino Kakesu
- Jouji Yanami as Shinigami (ep 8)
- Katsuji Mori as Jirou Morino
- Kouji Totani as Dog Asari
- Noriko Tsukase (1st voice) Michiko Nomura (2nd voice) as Ibara Yabunokouji
- Mugihito as Hachirou Kanda
- Toshiko Fujita as Futoko (ep 15)

== Reception ==
As of December 2013, the manga had a total circulation of 28 million copies.

In 1985, Asari-chan won the 30th Shogakukan Manga Award in the category Best Children's Manga. In 2014, it won the Judging Committee Special Award at the 59th Shogakukan Manga Award. The manga won the grand award at the 2014 Japan Cartoonists Association Award.
