= Denkigai no Honya-san =

Japanese manga series and its franchise

- First tankōbon volume, featuring Hiotan

デンキ街の本屋さん
- Genre: Romantic comedy
- Manga
- Written by: Asato Mizu
- Published by: Media Factory
- Magazine: Comic Flapper
- Original run: June 4, 2011 – November 4, 2017
- Volumes: 15
- Anime television series
- Directed by: Masafumi Sato
- Written by: Kazuyuki Fudeyasu
- Music by: Hiroshi Takaki
- Studio: Shin-Ei Animation
- Licensed by: NA: Ponycan USA
- Original network: Tokyo MX, BS11, AT-X
- Original run: October 2, 2014 – December 18, 2014
- Episodes: 12

Denkigai no Honya-san (デンキ街の本屋さん, Denkigai no Hon'ya-san; lit. "The Electric Town's Bookstore"), also known by the abbreviation Denki-gai (デンキ街, Denkigai), is a Japanese manga series written and illustrated by Asato Mizu. It depicts slice of life stories about a group of characters who work in a fictional doujin shop called Umanohone (うまのほね; "the horse's bone"), a reference to the real-life doujin shop Comic Toranoana (コミックとらのあな; "the tiger's lair"). It was serialized in Media Factory's Comic Flapper magazine from June 2011 to November 2017. A drama CD was released in August 2013. An anime television series adaptation produced by Shin-Ei Animation aired from October to December 2014.

== Characters ==
=== Umanohone Bookstore ===
Hiotan (ひおたん)
Voiced by: Natsumi Takamori
Hiotan is a part-time clerk at Umanohone. Her nickname comes from the fact that she is not an otaku, but is interested in boys' love. Unlike the others, she does not know much about anime. Hiotan acts innocent towards things that are perverted, but admits that she is "someone who really likes porn books". She is easily embarrassed and often teased by Kantoku, whom she has a crush on.

Sensei (先生, lit. Master)
Voiced by: Minami Tsuda
Another clerk at Umanohone, Sensei is an aspiring manga artist under the pen name "Jonatarou" (ジョナ太郎). Her nickname comes from the fact that she aims to become a great manga artist. Along with Sommelier, she is an avid reader of manga. Compared to Hiotan who is feminine, Sensei always dresses haphazardly, as she is not confident with her appearance and "Girl Power". When exhausted and over-worked, she becomes childish and has Hiotan calm her. She has a crush on Umio.

Fu Girl (腐ガール, Fu Gāru; lit. Rotten Girl)
Voiced by: Mako (drama CD), Ayana Taketatsu (anime)
One of the female clerks at Umanohone, Fu Girl is a 16-year-old high school girl who has the appearance and voice of a shy girl; this changes, however, when she sees something zombie themed or feels as though she is in charge. She's obsessive with zombies and even has prepared if one day there's a zombie outbreak. She sees Umio as person who sacrifices himself in a zombie outbreak and becomes one thus, she becomes violent to him. She has a crush on Sommelier. Her nickname comes from her obsessiveness towards zombies while her real name is Koharu Yatsu (谷津 コハル, Yatsu Koharu).

Kameko (カメ子, lit. Camera Girl)
Voiced by: Mai Aizawa
One of the female clerks at Umanohone, Kameko is a girl obsessed with cameras. She often captures pictures of Umanohone and its staff, but she has no confidence having her picture taken, as she stated that she is "not one for the spotlight". Her nickname can also mean turtle, explained the keychain on her camera. Kameko also seems to dislike when people try to take her hat off, as seen by Kantoku, whom she has a crush on.

Umio (海雄)
Voiced by: Ryōta Ōsaka
The newest employee of Umanohone, he is the straight man of the group who has not been given a nickname, though he becomes a different person when it comes to manga and anime, particularly 2D girls. He is a fan of "Jonatarou" and usually helps her with her manga. He is also a fan of Tsumorin. He and Sensei might be taking liking at each other. He has a younger sister who is a fujoshi.

Kantoku (カントク, lit. Director)
Voiced by: Yoshitsugu Matsuoka
Another clerk of Umanohone. He often records his employees on his video camera, especially Hiotan, and he got his nickname because he wanted to become a film director. He likes teasing the other employees, particularly Hiotan and Umio. He has a boob and underwear fetish. He used to be in a relationship with Tsumorin and according to her, Kantoku will tease and be mean but sometimes nice to the girl he likes. It seems that he and Hiotan have taken a liking to each other.

Sommelier (ソムリエ, Somurie)
Voiced by: Tomokazu Sugita (drama CD), Takahiro Tomita (anime)
A tall man with a big figure, Sommelier is another clerk at Umanohone. He has a profound knowledge of manga, and can match people to the suitable manga for them to read. A "Sommelier Meeting" is regularly held where he recommends manga to a lot of people. He is popular with the ladies. He was classmates with Erohon G-Man in elementary school. He later confessed his love to Fu Girl and they started dating.

Manager (店長, Tenchō)
The manager of Umanohone.

=== Others ===
Tsumorin (つもりん)
Voiced by: Satomi Satō
A former clerk at Umanohone who is now a light novel writer under the pen name Haruka Tsumori (つもり はるか, Tsumori Haruka). She loves to drink but is easily drunk. She and Kantoku used to be in a relationship and she held on to her unrequited feelings for him, but she also knows that Kantoku is in love with Hiotan.

Ero Hon G Men (エロ本Gメン, lit. Porn Book Agent)
Voiced by: Yū Kobayashi
A woman from the local government (Tokyo Youth Development Counselor) who often comes to inspect porn books (Ero Hon) for compliance with rules and regulations as they relate to adult materials. However, she loves boys' love books. She has a crush on Sommelier.

Taishi Yatsu (谷津 タイシ, Yatsu Taishi)
Fu Girl's younger brother who is still a middle high school sophomore. He calls his sister Haru.

Sora (そら, Sora)
Umio's younger sister who is in junior high. She is a big fujoshi who always connects things to boys' love situations.

== Media ==
=== Manga ===
Written and illustrated by Asato Mizu, Denkigai no Hon'ya-san was serialized in Media Factory's Comic Flapper magazine from June 4, 2011, to November 4, 2017. Media Factory published fifteen tankōbon volumes from November 22, 2011, to December 22, 2017. The manga was also published by Ever Glory Publishing in Taiwan.

==== Volumes ====
| No. | Release date | ISBN |
|---|---|---|
| 1 | November 22, 2011 | 978-4-04-066577-1 |
| 2 | April 23, 2012 | 978-4-04-066578-8 |
| 3 | August 23, 2012 | 978-4-04-066579-5 |
| 4 | January 23, 2013 | 978-4-04-066580-1 |
| 5 | July 23, 2013 | 978-4-04-066581-8 |
| 6 | December 21, 2013 | 978-4-04-066148-3 |
| 7 | May 23, 2014 | 978-4-04-066559-7 |
| 8 | September 23, 2014 | 978-4-04-066858-1 |
| 8.5 | September 23, 2014 | 978-4-04-066859-8 |
| 9 | February 23, 2015 | 978-4-04-067265-6 |
| 10 | July 23, 2015 | 978-4-04-067558-9 |
| 11 | January 23, 2016 | 978-4-04-067880-1 |
| 12 | June 23, 2016 | 978-4-04-068282-2 |
| 13 | November 21, 2016 | 978-4-04-068578-6 |
| 14 | May 23, 2017 | 978-4-04-069203-6 |
| 15 | December 22, 2017 | 978-4-04-069573-0 |

=== Drama CD ===
A drama CD titled Denkigai no Honya-san Drama CD: Umanohone no Hitobito (デンキ街の本屋さんドラマCD～うまのほねの人々～), produced by Hobirecords, was released on August 5, 2013, and was limited to being sold in Comic Toranoana stores. The script was written by Asato Mizu and Chabō Higurashi.

=== Anime ===
The anime television series adaptation was produced by Shin-Ei Animation and directed by Masafumi Sato. It aired from October 2 to December 18, 2014. The anime is licensed by Pony Canyon's North American label Ponycan USA, and the series streamed on Crunchyroll the same day it premiered in Japan. The opening theme is "Kajirikake no Ringo" (齧りかけの林檎; "A Half-Bitten Apple") by Ayana Taketatsu, while the ending theme is "two-Dimension's Love" by denk!girls (Natsumi Takamori, Minami Tsuda, Ayana Taketatsu, and Mai Aizawa).

==== Episodes ====
| No. | Title (Note: All English titles are taken from Crunchyroll.) | Original release date |
|---|---|---|
| 1 | "Love & Eros For All"; Transliteration: "Rabu ando Erosu fō Ōru" (Japanese: ラブ＆エロス フォー オール) | October 2, 2014 |
| 1 | "Nightmare Before Karnaval"; Transliteration: "Naitomea bifoa Karunabaru" (Japanese: ナイトメア ビフォア カルナバル) | October 2, 2014 |
At Umanohone, a shrink wrap incident occurs and the store is visited by the first time by the Ero Hon G Men during a Sommelier Party. The Ero Hon G Men makes another appearance at the party but not for work. It turns out that she likes boys' love as Sommelier picked out a boys' love manga for her. She then gives a speech on how she loves erotic books and how everyone loves erotic books. Umio fanboys about his favorite doujinshi artist Jonataro. it is then revealed that Jonataro is in fact Sensei, which shocks Umio because he thought Jonataro was a guy. Sensei is pressed to meet a deadline and Umio and Hiotan help her out. Sensei turns out to be a big cry baby about doing so much work and is only calmed by Hiotan's lap. Umio stays to help Sensei more. Sensei cries again while Umio consoles her treating her like a girl. This makes Sensei blush. The manga is finished and the next day the entire staff goes to a comic festival.
| 2 | "Deep Deep Night" | October 9, 2014 |
| 2 | "Is Electric Town Burning?"; Transliteration: "Denkigai wa Moete Iru ka" (デンキ街は燃えているか) | October 9, 2014 |
Umanohone has a late night sale that is busy and chaotic. It leaves everyone tired and exhausted. To celebrate the group goes to a family restaurant. Gradually everyone returns to Umanohone and sleep in the nap room. The next morning, Fu-girl put zombie make up on Umio and beats him with a bat for target practice. Everyone wakes up and ignores the two. Umanohone is having a summer festival. All the staff are involved in the festivities. The winning book shop receives 10,000 yen prizes and a year supply of oden. The games were set up as a otaku-sports fest. There is a catching underwear with your mouth jump. Rolling a golden ball and a waifu-carrying race. next was a tug-o-wa. The final match was a water shooter game. Sensei manages to win the festival by going solo.
| 3 | "Party Hard" | October 16, 2014 |
| 3 | "Hiotan, Go Home"; Transliteration: "Hiotan yo Ie ni Kaere" (ひおたんよ家に帰れ) | October 16, 2014 |
| 3 | "Endless Carnival"; Transliteration: "Endoresu Karunabaru" (エンドレス・カルナバル) | October 16, 2014 |
Umanohone is selling an eroge game, Die Heart 2. Hiotan and Fu Girl are made to cosplay outside the shop to advertise the game. Later, Hiotan and Kantoku go shopping and decorate Kantoku's house for a Christmas party. The following day, the staff arrives for a Christmas party. Everyone is in cosplay except for Sensei who is later forced to. Everyone takes a photo together. Kantoku laments as everyone is single for the holidays but Umio says he has a girlfriend. The entire group is shocked until Umio corrects them by saying he has an anime girlfriend. The Christmas party is over, everyone has left, and Kantoku is cleaning up. However, Hiotan remains and spend the rest of the day with Kantoku. Umahone is having a New Year sale. The shop becomes busy and crowded. Some many things are going crazy and nearly wrong. At the end of the sale, everyone is beat. Umio and Sensei go to a shrine together.
| 4 | "King of Pop"; Transliteration: "Kingu obu Poppu" (Japanese: キングオブPOP) | October 23, 2014 |
| 4 | "Chocolate Panic" | October 23, 2014 |
Everyone at the shop now has a shelf where they present manga that they like in order to increase sales. Hiotan thinks about the manga she likes and what to put on her shelf. Hiotan and the other girls go to Mikan Books to get Hiotan to read more manga and see what she likes. It is Valentine's Day at Umanohone. This brings pressure, confusion, and nervousness to the girls at the shop.
| 5 | "Panty Shot in Spring"; Transliteration: "Haru ni Panchira" (Japanese: 春にパンチラ) | October 30, 2014 |
| 5 | "I Am Rain" | October 30, 2014 |
| 5 | "Commotion"; Transliteration: "Zawameki" (Japanese: ざわめき) | October 30, 2014 |
Sensei needs help drawing a pantry shot in her manga and Umio helps her. Hilarities arise between the two as well as blushing faces. It is a rainy day at Umanohone. Tsumorin makes a debut at Umanohone.
| 6 | "Homeless"; Transliteration: "Yado wa Nashi" (Japanese: 宿はなし) | November 6, 2014 |
| 6 | "Secret Paradise" | November 6, 2014 |
Sensei has been sleeping at Umanohone in order to finish a manga by a deadline. The staff at Umanohone is willing to help her out. Sensei's girl power is in a crisis. Tsumorin is here to save the day.
| 7 | "To the Bath House"; Transliteration: "Iza Sentō e……" (Japanese: いざ銭湯へ……) | November 13, 2014 |
| 7 | "Overflow of Feelings"; Transliteration: "Mune ga Ippai" (Japanese: 胸がいっぱい) | November 13, 2014 |
Umanohone goes to an onsen. There is an anime festival and booths at Comiket. Kantoku says that he has someone he likes. Summer fair clean up day at Umanohone. Hiotan is acting weird.
| 8 | "The Sleeping One"; Transliteration: "Nemuru Hito" (Japanese: 眠る人) | November 20, 2014 |
| 8 | "Subtly Rough"; Transliteration: "Rafu Sarigenaku" (Japanese: ラフさりげなく) | November 20, 2014 |
Sensei is losing sleep. Sensei and Umio spend some time talking in the nap room. Sensei has to make a choice. Sensei accidentally asked Umio on a date. She cannot figure out what to wear or how to act. Her girl power is in danger and she seeks out help from the other female employees.
| 9 | "It's Not Love"; Transliteration: "Koijanaino" | November 27, 2014 |
| 9 | "Hey, How Are You Feeling?"; Transliteration: "Yā, Chōshi wa Dō dai" (やあ、調子はどうだい) | November 27, 2014 |
| 9 | "Snowy Night"; Transliteration: "Yuki no Furu Yoru" (雪の降る夜) | November 27, 2014 |
Hiotan caught a cold and took the day off from work. Kantoku comes to her apartment and to take care of her. He ends up spending the day with her. Hiotan becomes sick again and this time Sensei goes to take care of her. However, Sensei has ulterior motives for going to Hiotan's place. It is Christmas Eve so Umanohone is busy once again with a Christmas sale. Couples are the topic of discussion.
| 10 | "Wonderful Chocolate"; Transliteration: "Wandafuru Chokorēto" (Japanese: ワンダフル・チョコレート) | December 4, 2014 |
| 10 | "Chocolate Philosophy" | December 4, 2014 |
| 10 | "Tan-Colored Room"; Transliteration: "Ameiro no Heya" (Japanese: 飴色の部屋) | December 4, 2014 |
| 10 | "Caught You on a Sleepless Night"; Transliteration: "Nemurenuyoru ni Tsukamaeta" (Japanese: 眠れぬ夜につかまえた) | December 4, 2014 |
It is Valentine's Day again. Sensei battles with the process of making homemade chocolates. Tsumorin comes to the rescue once again. The girls at Umanohone go to cooking class. The next part is just as difficult; giving the chocolate. Sensei cannot say the words. White Day has come to Umanohone. Hiotan and Kantoku went out to prepare to stock some shelves but were locked out. They are stuck together for the night.
| 11 | "Starting Young"; Transliteration: "Chīsana Koro Kara" (Japanese: 小さな頃から) | December 11, 2014 |
| 11 | "Exposed Life"; Transliteration: "Abakareta Seikatsu" (Japanese: 暴かれた生活) | December 11, 2014 |
| 11 | "The Lips"; Transliteration: "Kuchibiru no Sore" (Japanese: 唇のソレ) | December 11, 2014 |
Ero Hon G Men and Sommelier were once classmates in elementary school. Childhood memories and eroge books are shared. Sensei's girl power is tracked and check by Hiotan and Tsumorin. Fu-girl wants to get bigger to get Sommelier to notice her more.
| 12 | "The Hermit's Library"; Transliteration: "Inja no Shoko" (Japanese: 隠者の書庫) | December 18, 2014 |
| 12 | "When the Cherry Blossoms Bloom"; Transliteration: "Sakura ga Saitara" (Japanese: 桜が咲いたら) | December 18, 2014 |
| 12 | "Welcoming Morning" | December 18, 2014 |
Umio rides the train home with a drunk Sensei. Sensei is in a really bad condition, so they go to Umio's apartment. However, its filled with a bunch of eroge and otaku stuff. The two stay up partially through the blush filled night. The staff at the Umanohone and some other characters go to on cherry blossom viewing picnic. The manager leads Umanohone's morning assembly.

== Reception ==
By June 2017, the manga had over 1 million copies in print.

== See also ==
- Aharen-san Is Indecipherable – Another manga series by the same author
- Blue Archive: The Grand Adventure of the Game Development Department – Another manga series by the same author
