= Panic! (video game) =

1993 video game

- North American cover art
- Developers: Sega; Office I
- Publishers: JP: Sega; NA: Data East USA
- Producer: Hajime Tabe
- Artist: Renzo Kinoshita
- Composer: Kei Tani
- Platforms: Sega CD, PlayStation 2
- Release: Sega CD: JP: April 23, 1993; NA: October 1994; PlayStation 2: JP: August 8, 2002
- Genres: Puzzle; Point and click
- Mode: Single player

Panic! (Note: Known in Japan as SWITCH (Japanese: スイッチ, Hepburn: Suitchi)) is a puzzle point and click video game developed by Sega and Office I and published by Sega in Japan and Data East USA in North America for the Sega CD, in collaboration with the Theatrical Group WAHAHA Hompo. It was released on April 23, 1993 in Japan, localized to North America in October 1994, and later released for the PlayStation 2 in Japan on August 8, 2002. The game involves pressing numerous buttons in order to transverse a young boy, called Slap, or his dog, called Stick, through a complex labyrinth. It is one of the few Sega CD games that supports the Sega Mega Mouse.

== Story ==
During the intro, the game explains that a virus has infected the world's computer systems. Slap and his dog Stick (who has been sucked into his TV) must carry an antidote to the central computer to fix it. To this end, Slap and Stick must traverse a grid of levels, pushing buttons to advance.

== Gameplay ==
Each level is presented as a new area with a mechanical device, and a set of buttons to press. Each button causes a humorous surrealist animation and/or teleports Slap to another room. Sometimes the buttons are booby-trapped and cause the destruction of a variety of monuments. The grid also features a few game overs, marked by flashing skulls on the map. The buttons themselves have no indication on what they do when pressed. It is possible to backtrack into previous levels, and buttons once pressed are not marked, unless they were booby-trapped. The game's pause menu features a map of the rooms and how the player has progressed on them — though with no indication of the path or what lead to where — and the player must reach the bottom of the map to win the game.

== Version differences ==
Two stages were removed for the North American release: Level 2-B, a scene with a cigarette machine, and Level 9-B, featuring a Japanese typewriter. The level 12-D sends the player to the Japanese Mega-CD BIOS screen, but this scene was not changed in the North American version and still showed the Japanese BIOS screen instead of the American one.

== Reception ==
Reception

Review score
Publication	Score
Sega Power	Sega CD: 81%

The four reviewers of Electronic Gaming Monthly noted that Panic! is not actually a game, but opined that it is nonetheless very original and enjoyable for a while, though all but one of them also felt it gets boring fairly quickly. They particularly enjoyed the high quality animations and often "sick" sense of humor, and gave it a score of 5.75 out of 10. GamePro panned the game, chiefly for its trial-and-error gameplay which requires players to watch many "pointless" scenes. They added: "You might feel differently if there were at least great jokes coming from the switches, but the humor is mostly simplistic cartoons with childish graphics, like basic versions of animations from Monty Python." They gave Panic! a 2.0 out of 5 for graphics, 4.0 for sound, and 1.0 for both control and fun factor, making it one of only 12 games in GamePro history to earn a score of 1.0 or lower. Game Players magazine described the game as being made "for people on drugs, by people on drugs."

Richard Leadbetter, editor of Mean Machines Sega, awarded the Japanese version of the game a score of 90%.

Next Generation reviewed the Sega CD version of the game, rating it two stars out of five, and stated that "Panic wants to defy description and critical analysis. [...] In a word, weird."
