= Go-Bang's =

Japanese pop/rock band

- Origin: Sapporo, Hokkaidō, Japan
- Genres: Pop, pop rock, Shibuya-kei
- Years active: 1983 – 1994
- Labels: Switch; Pony Canyon; BMG Victor
- Past members: Kaori Moriwaka; Misa Tanishima; Mitsuko Saito

The Go-Bang's were a three-piece Japanese all-female band active in the late 1980s and early 1990s. They broke up in 1994, and since then, Kaori Moriwaka (singer/songwriter) has become a solo singer/songwriter/producer/actress, while Mitsuko Saito (drums) and Misa Tanishima (bass guitar) have dropped beneath the radar, though apparently Saito has been seen drumming for a few other bands, fashion-modeling and played a drummer as an extra in the music video of J-pop singer Namie Amuro's Please Smile Again.

Initially a four-piece band, Go-Bang's lost their guitarist early on, becoming popular after she left the band. At the peak of their career, the album "Greatest Venus" went straight to the top of Oricon's Japanese album chart and stayed there for two consecutive weeks. They had a somewhat unusual sound, being a punk-influenced bubblegum pop band, and lacking a lead guitarist — though this wasn't always the case — on the album Samantha, for example, the Go-Bang's worked with the King Gangs, a three-piece all-male band, who complemented their line up with the addition of electric guitars and keyboard.

The album Samantha was mixed down by Michael Haas, who was a recording engineer for British techno/house band 808 State, at Revolution Studios in Manchester, England. Also, the album's title song "Samansa" was reproduced as an English language song and remixed by John Waddel from Rhythm King Productions, who produced British pop singer/rap artist Betty Boo. This remix version of the song was released as one of the songs on their remix mini album "Darrin."

Making cheerful, bouncy music, with a slight punk edge, the Go-Bang's made an impact on the Japanese charts for a short while, but gradually faded into the background, and disappeared almost completely from the public conscious following their breakup. However, some bands, such as the Titan Go-Kings, have referred to them as influences on their music.

== Discography ==
=== Albums ===
- ゴーバニックランド (Gobanic Land) (Pony Canyon, May 21, 1988)
- ピグミ→・ピンキ→ (Pygmy Pinky) (Pony Canyon, November 21, 1988)
- スペシャル アイ・ラブ・ユー (Special 'I Love You') (Pony Canyon, May 5, 1989)
- グレイテスト・ビーナス (Greatest Venus) (Pony Canyon, March 3, 1990)
- SAMANTHA(Pony Canyon, March 3, 1991)
- DARRIN (Pony Canyon, June 6, 1991)
- ワンダーフルーツ (Wonder Fruits) (BMG Victor, July 22, 1992)
- DANGEROUS CHARMS (BMG Victor, June 23, 1993)
- THE RECYCLE HITS (BMG Victor, November 21, 1993)
- バイオニックロック (Bionic Rock) (BMG Victor, April 21, 1994)

=== Compilations ===
- 7DAY'S GO! GO! BOX (No record label, February 14, 1986)
- ハッスルはお好き? (Would You Like 'Hustle'?) (Switch, May 21, 1988)
- THE TV ショー (The TV Show) (Pony Canyon, September 21, 1989)

=== E.P's ===
- HUSTLE BANG! BANG! (Switch, May 21, 1987)
- プリマドンナはお好き? (Would You Like Prima Donna?) (Switch, October 21, 1987)

=== Singles ===
- ざまぁ カンカン 娘(ガール) (That'll Show You Girl) (Pony Canyon, April 21, 1988)
- かっこイイ(E)、ダーリン。 (Cool Darlin') (Pony Canyon, November 21, 1988)
- スペシャル・ボーイフレンド (Special Boyfriend) (Pony Canyon, April 21, 1989)
- あいにきて I・NEED・YOU! (Come to See Me, I Need You!) (Pony Canyon, December 27, 1989)
- 無敵のビーナス (Invincible Venus) (Pony Canyon, April 21, 1990)
- ロックンロールサンタクロース (Rock 'n' Roll Santa Claus) (Pony Canyon, November 21, 1990)
- BYE・BYE・BYE (Pony Canyon, February 21, 1991)
- ちょっとだけハイカラ (A Little Bit of Plush) (BMG Victor, July 8, 1992)
- 恋のフリフリ (Amorous Sway) (BMG Victor, December 16, 1992)
- ダイナマイトガイ (Dynamite Guy) (BMG Victor, June 23, 1993)
- キスしたい (I Wanna Kiss) (BMG Victor, April 21, 1994)

=== Anime Opening Themes ===
CREAM SODA・MELON SODA from the album SAMANTHA was used as the opening theme for the anime adaptation of Dororonpa! in 1991, broadcast by TV Asahi.
