= List of films: L =

indexed lists of films
| 0–9 | A | B | C | D | E | F |
| G | H | I | J–K | L | M | N–O |
| P | Q–R | S | T | U–V–W | X–Y–Z | |

This is an alphabetical list of film articles (or sections within articles about films). It includes made for television films. See the talk page for the method of indexing used.

== L ==
- L.A. Confidential (1997)
- L.A. Heat (1989)
- L.A. Law: The Movie (2002)
- L.A. Slasher (2015)
- L.A. Story (1991)
- L.A. Takedown (1989 TV)
- L.A. Wars (1994)
- L.A. Without a Map (1998)
- L.I.E. (2001)
- L.O.R.D: Legend of Ravaging Dynasties (2016)
- L'arma (1978)
- L'Animale (2018)
- L'Atalante (1934)
- L'ora legale (2017)

=== La ===
- La Bamba (1987)
- La Strada (1954)
- La La La at Rock Bottom (2015)
- La La Land (2016)

==== Laa–Lac ====
- Laadam (2009)
- Laado (2000)
- Laaga Chunari Mein Daag (2007)
- Laagi Naahi Chhute Rama (1963)
- Laaj (2003)
- Laal (2019) (TV)
- Laal Ishq (2016)
- Laal Kabootar (2019)
- Laal Kaptaan (2019)
- Laal Moroger Jhuti (2021)
- Laal Paree (1991)
- Laal Rang (2016)
- Laal Singh Chaddha (2022)
- Laali (1997)
- Laali Haadu (2003)
- Laali Ki Shaadi Mein Laaddoo Deewana (2017)
- Laan (2011)
- Laash (1998)
- Laat Saheb (1946)
- Laati (1992)
- Laalo – Krishna Sada Sahaayate (2025)
- Laapataa Ladies (2023)
- Laawaris: (1981 & 1999)
- The Lab (2013)
- Lab en Kisses (1996)
- Lab Kita, Bilib Ka Ba? (1994)
- Laban sa Lahat (1958)
- Labanang Lalaki (1996)
- Labor Day (2013)
- Labor of Love (1998) (TV)
- Labor Pains (2009)
- Laborer's Love (1922)
- Labou (2008)
- The Labour Leader (1917)
- Labyrinth (1959)
- Labyrinth (1986)
- Labyrinth (1991)
- Labyrinth (2002)
- Labyrinth of Cinema (2019)
- Labyrinth of Horror (1921)
- Labyrinth of Lies (2014)
- Labyrinth of Passion (1982)
- Lace: (1926 & 1928)
- Lace Crater (2015)
- The Lace Wars (1965)
- The Lacemaker (1977)
- Laces (2018)
- Lachhi (1949)
- Lackawanna Blues (2005 TV)
- The Lackey and the Lady (1919)
- Lacombe Lucien (1974)
- The Lacquered Box (1932)

==== Lad ====
- The Lad (1935)
- The Lad from Old Ireland (1910)
- Lad from Our Town (1942)
- Lad, A Dog (1962)
- Lad, A Yorkshire Story (2013)
- Ladaai (1989)
- Ladaai Ke Baad (1943)
- Ladaaku (1981)
- Ladakh Chale Rickshawala (2019)
- Ladder 49 (2004)
- The Ladder of Lies (1920)
- Laddie Be Good (1928)
- Laddu Babu (2014)
- Ladies in Black (2018)
- Ladies of the Chorus (1948)
- Ladies Courageous (1944)
- Ladies Crave Excitement (1935)
- Ladies in Distress (1938)
- Ladies Doctor (1996)
- Ladies at Ease (1927)
- Ladies First: (2017 & 2026)
- Ladies and Gentleman (2013)
- Ladies & Gentlemen (2015)
- Ladies and Gentlemen, The Fabulous Stains (2003)
- Ladies and Gentlewomen (2017)
- Ladies Hostel (1973)
- Ladies Invite Gentlemen (1980)
- Ladies in Lavender (2004)
- Ladies Love Brutes (1930)
- Ladies Love Danger (1935)
- The Ladies Man: (1961 & 2000)
- Ladies of the Mob (1928)
- Ladies Must Live: (1921 & 1940)
- Ladies Must Love (1933)
- Ladies Must Play (1930)
- Ladies Only: (1939 & unreleased)
- Ladies at Play (1926)
- Ladies They Talk About (1933)
- Ladies Who Do (1963)
- Ladies' Choice (1980)
- Ladies' Day (1943)
- Ladies' Man: (1931 & 1947)
- Ladies' Night (2003)
- Ladies' Night in a Turkish Bath (1928)
- Ladies' Tango (1983)
- The Lads (2018)
- The Lady: (1925 & 2011)
- Lady Bird (2017)
- Lady of Burlesque (1943)
- Lady in a Cage (1964)
- Lady Caroline Lamb (1972)
- Lady in Cement (1968)
- Lady Chatterley (2006)
- Lady Chatterley's Lover: (1955, 1981, 2015 TV & 2022)
- Lady Cocoa (1975)
- Lady in the Dark (1944)
- Lady for a Day (1933)
- Lady Death: The Motion Picture (2004)
- The Lady with the Dog (1960)
- The Lady and the Duke (2001)
- Lady of the Dynasty (2015)
- The Lady Eve (1941)
- Lady Frankenstein (1971)
- Lady Be Good: (1928 & 1941)
- Lady Helen's Escapade (1909)
- Lady Jane: (1986 & 2008)
- Lady Jayne: Killer (2003)
- Lady Killer (1933)
- Lady in the Lake (1947)
- The Lady of the Lake (1928)
- Lady Macbeth (2016)
- Lady Macbeth of the Mtsensk District (1989)
- Lady of the Manor (2021)
- Lady for a Night (1942)
- Lady of the Night: (1925 & 1986)
- Lady of the Pavements (1929)
- The Lady in Question: (1940 & 1999 TV)
- The Lady from Shanghai (1948)
- Lady Sings the Blues (1972)
- Lady with the Small Foot (1920)
- Lady Snowblood (1973)
- A Lady Takes a Chance (1943)
- Lady on a Train (1945)
- Lady and the Tramp: (1955 & 2019)
- Lady and the Tramp II: Scamp's Adventure (2001)
- The Lady in the Van (2015)
- The Lady Vanishes: (1938, 1979 & 2013)
- Lady Vengeance (2005)
- Lady in the Water (2006)
- Lady in White (1988)
- The Lady Is Willing: (1934 & 1942)
- Lady Windermere's Fan: (1916, 1925, 1935 & 1944)
- A Lady Without Passport (1950)
- Lady, Let's Dance (1944)
- Lady, Play Your Mandolin! (1931)
- A Lady's Morals (1930)
- A Lady's Name (1918)
- A Lady's Profession (1933)
- The Ladybird (1927)
- Ladybird, Ladybird (1994)
- Ladybug Ladybug (1963)
- Ladybugs (1992)
- Ladyhawke (1985)
- The Ladykillers: (1955 & 2004)
- Ladyworld (2018)

==== Laf–Lak ====
- The Lafarge Case (1938)
- Lafayette Escadrille (1958)
- Lafayette, We Come (1918)
- Laffing Time (1959)
- Lagaam (1976)
- Lagaan (2001)
- Lagan (1941)
- Lagardère (2003)
- Lage Raho Munna Bhai (2006)
- Lagna Pahave Karun (2013)
- Lagna Pathrike (1967)
- Lagos Cougars (2013)
- Laguna Heat (1987 TV)
- Laheri Badmash (1944)
- Laheri Cameraman (1944)
- Laheri Jeewan (1941)
- Lahiri Lahiri Lahirilo (2002)
- Lahore (2010)
- Lahore Se Aagey (2016)
- Lahu Ke Do Rang (1979)
- Lahu Ke Do Rang (1997)
- Lahure (1989)
- Lai Bhaari (2014)
- Lai Shi, China's Last Eunuch (1988)
- Laid in America (2016)
- Laid to Rest (2009)
- Laila (1929)
- Laila (1984)
- Laila (1997)
- Laila Majnu (1949)
- Laila Majnu (1950)
- Laila Majnu (1962)
- Laila Majnu (1976)
- Laila Majnu (2018)
- The Lair of the White Worm (1988)
- Lajja (2001)
- Lajjaavathi (1979)
- Lake City (2008)
- Lake Dead (2008)
- Lake of the Dead (1958)
- Lake of Dracula (1971)
- Lake Eerie (2016)
- Lake of Fire (2006)
- Lake George (2024)
- The Lake House (2006)
- Lake of Ladies (1934)
- Lake Mungo (2008)
- Lake Placid series:
  - Lake Placid (1999)
  - Lake Placid 2 (2007) (TV)
  - Lake Placid 3 (2010) (TV)
  - Lake Placid: The Final Chapter (2012) (TV)
  - Lake Placid vs. Anaconda (2015) (TV)
  - Lake Placid: Legacy (2018) (TV)
- Lake Placid Serenade (1944)
- Lake of Tears (1966)
- Lakeboat (2000)
- Lakeer – Forbidden Lines (2004)
- Lakeview Terrace (2008)
- Lakh Taka (1953)
- Lakhan (1979)
- Lakhipurgi Lakhipyari (2007)
- Lakhon Hain Yahan Dilwale (2015)
- Lakhon Ki Baat (1984)
- Lakhon Me Ek (1971)
- Lakhon Mein Aik (1967)
- Laki-Laki Tak Bernama (1969)
- Lakshya (2004)

==== Lal–Lam ====
- Lal Americayil (1989)
- Lal Baadshah (1999)
- Lal Bhadur Shastri (2014)
- Lal Chunariya (1983)
- Lal Darja (1997)
- Lal Dupatta (1948)
- Lal Dupatta Malmal Ka (1988)
- Lal Haveli (1944)
- Lal Kajol (1982)
- Lal Kothi (1978)
- Lal Pahare'r Katha (2007)
- Lal Pathore (1964)
- Lal Patthar (1971)
- Lal Ronger Duniya (2008)
- Lal Salaam (2002)
- Lal Salaam (2024)
- Lal Salam (1990)
- Lal Shari (2023)
- Lal Sobujer Sur (2016)
- Lal Tip (2012)
- Lala's Gun (2008)
- Lalaji (1942)
- Lalanna's Song (2022)
- Lali (2026)
- Lalita (1949)
- Lalita (1984)
- Lalitha (1976)
- Lalitham Sundaram (2022)
- Lalka Paag (2015)
- Lalkar (1972)
- Lalla vinner! (1932)
- Lallasi Pal (2002)
- Lalon (2004)
- Laloolal.com (2016)
- Lalsalu (2001)
- Lalu Bhulu (1983)
- Lamb: (1986, 2015 American, 2015 Ethiopian & 2021)
- The Lamb: (1915, 1918 & 2014)
- Lambada (1990)
- Lambchops (1929)
- Lamborghini: The Man Behind the Legend (2022)
- The Lame Devil (1948)
- Lamerica (1994)
- Lammbock (2001)

==== Lan ====
- Lan Kwai Fong (2011)
- Lan Kwai Fong 2 (2012)
- Lan Kwai Fong 3 (2014)
- Lan Yu (2001)
- Lance (2020)
- Lancelot and Guinevere (1963)
- Lancelot du Lac (1974)
- Land (2018)
- Land (2021)
- The Land (1969)
- The Land (1974)
- The Land (2016)
- A Land for All (1962)
- Land of Angels (1962)
- Land of Angels (2026)
- Land of Ashes (2019)
- Land of Bad (2024)
- The Land Before Time series:
  - The Land Before Time (1988)
  - The Land Before Time II: The Great Valley Adventure (1994)
  - The Land Before Time III: The Time of the Great Giving (1995)
  - The Land Before Time IV: Journey Through the Mists (1996)
  - The Land Before Time V: The Mysterious Island (1997)
  - The Land Before Time VI: The Secret of Saurus Rock (1998)
  - The Land Before Time VII: The Stone of Cold Fire (2000)
  - The Land Before Time VIII: The Big Freeze (2001)
  - The Land Before Time IX: Journey to Big Water (2002)
  - The Land Before Time X: The Great Longneck Migration (2003)
  - The Land Before Time XI: Invasion of the Tinysauruses (2005)
  - The Land Before Time XII: The Great Day of the Flyers (2006)
  - The Land Before Time XIII: The Wisdom of Friends (2007)
  - The Land Before Time XIV: Journey of the Brave (2016)
- The Land Beyond the Law (1927)
- The Land Beyond the Sunset (1912)
- Land of the Blind (2006)
- Land of the Brave (2019)
- Land of College Prophets (2005)
- Land of the Dead (2005)
- Land of Doom (1986)
- Land of Dreams (1988)
- Land of Dreams (1993)
- Land of Dreams (2021)
- Land of Fighting Men (1938)
- Land of the Free (1998)
- Land and Freedom (1995)
- The Land Girls (1998)
- Land of Happiness (2024)
- The Land of Happiness (1993)
- The Land Has Eyes (2004)
- Land Ho! (2014)
- Land of Hope (2018)
- The Land of Hope (1921)
- The Land of Hope (2012)
- Land of Hope and Glory (1927)
- Land of Hunted Men (1943)
- Land of Hypocrisy (1968)
- A Land Imagined (2018)
- The Land Is Ours (1951)
- The Land of Jazz (1920)
- Land of the Lawless (1947)
- Land of Legends (2022)
- Land Legs (2015)
- Land of Liberty (1939)
- The Land of Long Shadows (1917)
- Land of Look Behind (1982)
- Land of the Lost (2009)
- Land of Love (1937)
- Land of Lovers (1984)
- Land Matters (2009)
- Land of Men (2009)
- Land of the Midnight Fun (1939)
- Land of Milk and Honey (1971)
- Land of Mine (2015)
- Land Mines - A Love Story (2005)
- Land of the Minotaur (1976)
- The Land of Missing Men (1930)
- Land of My Fathers (1921)
- Land of No Return (1978)
- Land of Oblivion (2011)
- Land of the Open Range (1942)
- Land of Opportunity (2007)
- Land of the Outlaws (1944)
- The Land of Owls (2021)
- The Land of Oz (2015)
- Land of Passions (1943)
- Land of Peace (1957)
- Land of the Pharaohs (1955)
- Land of Plenty (2004)
- The Land of Promise (1917)
- Land Raiders (1970)
- Land of Saints (2015)
- The Land of Sannikov (1974)
- The Land of Sasha (2022)
- Land and Shade (2015)
- Land of Silence and Darkness (1971)
- Land of the Silver Fox (1928)
- Land of the Six Guns (1940)
- The Land of Smiles (1930)
- The Land of Smiles (1952)
- Land and Sons (1980)
- The Land of Steady Habits (2018)
- Land of Storms (2014)
- The Land That Time Forgot: (1974 & 2009)
- The Land That Waited (1963)
- The Land Unknown (1957)
- The Land of the Wandering Souls (2000)
- Land of Wanted Men (1931)
- Land of Widows (2011)
- Land Without Bread (1933)
- Land Without Music (1936)
- Land Without Stars (1946)
- Land Without Women (1929)
- Landfall (1949)
- Landfall (1975)
- Landfall (2017)
- Landing at Low Tide (1896)
- The Landlady of Maria Wörth (1952)
- Landless (2018)
- Landline (2017)
- The Landloper (1918)
- Landlord (2026)
- The Landlord (1970)
- The Landlord (2007)
- The Landlords (2012)
- The Landowner's Daughter (1953)
- Landru (1963)
- Landscape (2000)
- Landscape After the Battle (1970)
- A Landscape of Lies (2011)
- Landscape in the Mist (1988)
- Landscape Suicide (1987)
- Landslide (1937)
- Landslide (1940)
- The Lane That Had No Turning (1922)
- Lanfranchi's Memorial Discotheque (2010)
- A Language All My Own (1935)
- Language of a Broken Heart (2013)
- Language Lessons (2021)
- Language of Love (1969)
- Language Says It All (1987)
- Langue étrangère (2024)
- Langue sacrée, langue parlée (2008)
- Languid Kisses, Wet Caresses 1976)
- Lani Loa – The Passage (1998)
- Lanka (2006)
- Lanka (2011)
- Lanka (2017)
- Lanka Dahan (1917)
- Lanke (2021)
- Lankesh Patrike (2003)
- Lankesha (2001)
- Lankeswarudu (1989)
- Lanphamda Ibeni (2011)
- Lansky (1999) (TV)
- Lansky (2021)
- Lantana (2001)
- The Lantern (1925)
- The Lantern (1938)
- Lantern Hill (1989) (TV)
- Lanterns on Blue Waters (1983) (TV)

==== Lap–Lar ====
- Lapin kullan kimallus (1999)
- Lapitch the Little Shoemaker (1997)
- Lapsis (2020)
- Laputa: Castle in the Sky (1986)
- Lara (2019)
- Lara (2025)
- Lara and the Beat (2018)
- Lara Croft: Tomb Raider – The Cradle of Life (2003)
- Lara Croft: Tomb Raider (2001)
- The Laramie Project (2002)
- Larceny: (1948 & 2004)
- Larceny, Inc. (1942)
- Larger than Life (1996)
- Larki Panjaban (2003)
- Larks on a String (1969)
- Larry the Cable Guy: Health Inspector (2006)
- Larry Crowne (2011)
- Lars and the Real Girl (2007)
- Larva (2012)

==== Las ====
- The Las Vegas Story (1952)
- Laser Mission (1990)
- Laserblast (1978)
- Lassie series:
  - Lassie: (1994 & 2005)
  - Lassie Come Home (1943)
- Last Action Hero (1993)
- The Last Airbender (2010)
- The Last American Hero (1973)
- The Last American Virgin (1982)
- The Last Billionaire (1934)
- The Last Black Man in San Francisco (2019)
- The Last Blockbuster (2020)
- The Last Bohemian: (1912 & 1931)
- The Last Boy Scout (1991)
- Last Breath: (2019 & 2025)
- The Last Broadcast (1998)
- The Last Bus (2021)
- The Last Butterfly (1991)
- Last Cab to Darwin (2015)
- Last Call: (1991, 1995 & 2002)
- Last Cannibal World (1978)
- The Last Castle (2001)
- The Last Challenge (1967)
- Last Chance Harvey (2008)
- Last Christmas (2019)
- The Last Command: (1928 & 1955)
- The Last Company (1930)
- Last Dance: (1996 & 2012)
- Last Day of Summer (2009)
- The Last Day of Summer: (1958 & 2007 TV)
- Last Days: (2005 & 2014)
- The Last Days of American Crime (2020)
- Last Days in the Desert (2015)
- The Last Days of Disco (1998)
- Last Days in Havana (2016)
- The Last Days of Pompeii: (1908, 1913, 1926, 1935, 1950 & 1959)
- The Last Days of Pompeo (1937)
- Last Days in Vietnam (2014)
- The Last Detail (1973)
- Last of the Dogmen (1995)
- The Last Dragon (1985)
- The Last Duel: (1981 & 2021)
- Last Embrace (1979)
- The Last Emperor (1987)
- The Last of England (1987)
- Last Exit: (2003 & 2006)
- Last Exit to Brooklyn (1990)
- The Last Exorcism (2010)
- The Last Exorcism Part II (2013)
- The Last Five Years (2015)
- Last Flag Flying (2017)
- The Last Hill (1944)
- Last Holiday: (1950 & 2006)
- The Last Horror Film (1982)
- The Last Horror Movie (2003)
- Last House on Dead End Street (1973)
- The Last House on the Left: (1972 & 2009)
- Last House Standing (2004)
- The Last Hunt (1956)
- The Last Hurrah: (1958, 1977 TV & 2009)
- Last Hurrah for Chivalry (1979)
- The Last King of Scotland (2006)
- The Last Kiss: (2001, 2006 & 2026)
- Last Knight (2017)
- The Last Laugh: (1924, 2016 & 2019)
- The Last Legion (2007)
- The Last Letter from Your Lover (2021)
- Last Life in the Universe (2003)
- Last Looks (2022)
- Last Love: (1935, 1947, 1949, 2007 & 2013)
- The Last Man on Earth: (1924, 1964 & 2011)
- Last Man Standing (1996)
- The Last Married Couple in America (1980)
- The Last Matinee (2020)
- The Last Mercenary: (1968 & 2021)
- The Last Metro (1980)
- The Last Mimzy (2007)
- Last of the Mobile Hot Shots (1970)
- The Last of the Mohicans: (1911, 1920 American, 1920 German, 1936, 1968, 1977 TV & 1992)
- The Last Movie (1971)
- The Last Movie Star (2017)
- Last of the Mustangs (2006)
- The Last: Naruto the Movie (2014)
- Last Night: (1964, 1998 & 2010)
- Last Night at the Alamo (1983)
- The Last Night of the Barbary Coast (1913)
- The Last Night of Scheherazade (1987)
- Last Night in Soho (2021)
- A Last Note (1995)
- Last Order: Final Fantasy VII (2005)
- Last Orders (2002)
- The Last Picture Show (1971)
- The Last Polka (1984)
- Last Present (2001)
- The Last Quarter (2004)
- The Last Remake of Beau Geste (1977)
- Last Resort: (1986 & 2000)
- The Last Resort (2018)
- The Last Reunion (1982)
- Last Rites: (1975 & 1988)
- Last Rites of the Dead (2006)
- The Last Rites of Joe May (2011)
- The Last Rodeo (2025)
- The Last Roman (1968–69)
- The Last Romantic (1985) (TV)
- The Last Samurai (2003)
- The Last Seduction (1994)
- The Last Seduction II (1999)
- The Last of Sheila (1973)
- The Last Song: (1980 TV & 2010)
- The Last Stage (1947)
- The Last Stand: (1938, 1984 & 2013)
- The Last Starfighter (1984)
- The Last Station (2009)
- The Last Step (2012)
- The Last Stop (2012)
- Last Stop on the Night Train (1975)
- Last Summer (1969)
- The Last Sunset (1961)
- The Last Supper: (1976, 1994, 1995, 2003, 2006, 2012 & 2025)
- The Last Survivors (2014)
- Last Tango in Paris (1972)
- The Last Temptation of Christ (1988)
- The Last Ten Days (1955)
- The Last Thanksgiving (2020)
- The Last Thing He Wanted (2020)
- The Last Time (2006)
- The Last Time I Saw Paris (1954)
- The Last Tomahawk (1965)
- Last Train from Gun Hill (1959)
- The Last Train from Madrid (1937)
- The Last Tree (2019)
- The Last Tycoon: (1976 & 2012)
- The Last Unicorn (1982)
- The Last Valley (1971)
- Last Vegas (2013)
- The Last Vermeer (2019)
- The Last Voyage (1960)
- The Last Voyage of the Demeter (2023)
- The Last Waltz (1976)
- The Last War (1961)
- The Last Warning: (1928 & 1939)
- The Last Warrior: (1970, 2000 & 2017)
- The Last Warrior: A Messenger of Darkness (2021)
- The Last Warrior: Root of Evil (2021)
- The Last Wave (1977)
- Last Wedding (2001)
- The Last Winter: (1960, 1984, 1989 & 2006)
- The Last Witch Hunter (2015)
- Last Woman on Earth (1960)
- The Last Women Standing (2015)
- The Last Word: (1973, 1975, 1979, 2008, 2009 & 2017)
- Last Words: (1968 & 2020)
- Last Year at Marienbad (1961)

==== Lat ====
- Late Afternoon (2017)
- Late at Night (1946)
- Late August at the Hotel Ozone (1967)
- Late August, Early September (1998)
- Late Autumn: (1960 & 2010)
- Late Bloomers: (2006, 2011 & 2023)
- Late Blossom (2011)
- Late Chrysanthemums (1954)
- Late Dates (1980)
- Late Extra (1935)
- Late Fame (2025)
- Late Flowering Lust (1994 TV)
- Late Flowers (1970)
- Late for a Date (1936)
- Late for Dinner (1991)
- Late Fragment (2007)
- The Late George Apley (1947)
- The Late, Great Planet Earth (1978)
- Late Last Night (1999 TV)
- Late Life: The Chien-Ming Wang Story (2018)
- Late Love (1943)
- Late Marriage (2001)
- Late Meeting (1979 TV)
- Late Night (2019)
- Late Night Shopping (2001)
- Late Night with the Devil (2023)
- Late Phases (2014)
- A Late Quartet (2012)
- Late Shift (2025)
- The Late Shift (1996) (TV)
- The Late Show (1977)
- Late Spring: (1949 & 2014)
- Late Summer Blues (1987)
- Lateef (2005)
- Lathe of Heaven (2002 TV)
- The Lathe of Heaven (1980 TV)
- Latitude Zero (1969)
- Latter Days (2003)

==== Lau–Laz ====
- Laughing at Death (1929)
- Laughing Gas (1914)
- Laughing Gravy (1931)
- Laughing Heirs (1933)
- The Laughing Policeman (1974)
- Laughter in Paradise (1951)
- Laura: (1944, 1968 TV & 1979)
- Laura Lansing Slept Here (1988) (TV)
- Laure (1976)
- Laurel Canyon (2002)
- Laurence Anyways (2012)
- Lav Kush (1997)
- Lava (1980)
- Lava (1985)
- Lava (2001)
- Lava (2014)
- Lava Kusa: The Warrior Twins (2011)
- Lavender: (1953, 2000, 2015, 2016 & 2019)
- The Lavender Hill Mob (1951)
- Lavoura Arcaica (2001)
- Law Abiding Citizen (2009)
- Law of the Border (1966)
- Law of Desire (1987)
- Law and Order: (1932, 1940, 1942, 1953 & 1969)
- Lawless (2012)
- The Lawless Nineties (1936)
- Lawman (1971)
- Lawn Dogs (1997)
- The Lawnmower Man (1992)
- Lawnmower Man 2: Beyond Cyberspace (1996)
- Lawrence of Arabia (1962)
- Laws of Attraction (2004)
- Laws of Gravity (1992)
- Layer Cake (2004)
- Layla and Majnun (1937)
- Lazarus (1902)
- The Lazarus Effect: (2010 TV & 2015)
- The Lazarus Project (2008)
- Lazer Team (2015)
- Lazer Team 2 (2017)

=== Le ===
==== Lea ====
- Lea and Darija (2012)
- Lea and Mira (2016)
- Lead Me Home (2021)
- The Lead Singer and Dancer and His Woman (2015)
- Leadbelly (1976)
- Leader: Amie Bangladesh (2023)
- Leading Ladies (2010)
- Leading Lady (2014)
- Leading Lady Parts (2018)
- The Leading Man (1996)
- Leafie, A Hen into the Wild (2011)
- The League of Extraordinary Gentlemen (2003)
- The League of Gentlemen (1960)
- The League of Gentlemen's Apocalypse (2005)
- League of Gods (2016)
- A League of Their Own (1992)
- Leak (2000)
- Lean on Me (1989)
- Leap (2020)
- Leap of Faith (1992)
- Leap Year: (1924, 1932 & 2010)
- Leapin' Leprechauns! (1995)
- Learn by Heart (2015)
- Learn to Swim (2021)
- Learning to Drive (2014)
- Learning to Lie (2003)
- Learning to Love (1925)
- The Learning Tree (1969)
- Lease Wife (2006)
- Least Among Saints (2012)
- Least We Forget (1954)
- The Leather Boys (1964)
- Leather Face (1939)
- Leather Jackets (1992)
- Leather Stocking (1909)
- Leatherface (2017)
- Leatherface: The Texas Chainsaw Massacre III (1990)
- Leatherheads (2008)
- Leave 'Em Laughing (1928)
- Leave Her to Heaven (1945)
- Leave It to Beaver (1997)
- Leave No Trace (2018)
- Leaves of Grass (2010)
- Leaves from Satan's Book (1920)
- Leaving Las Vegas (1995)
- Leaving Metropolis (2002)
- Leaving Neverland (2019)
- Leaving Normal (1992)

==== Leb–Lem ====
- Lebanon (2009)
- Led Zeppelin DVD (2003)
- Leda: The Fantastic Adventure of Yohko (1985)
- The Ledge (2011)
- Lee: (2007, 2017 & 2023)
- Lee Dae-ro Can't Die (2005)
- Lee Daniels' The Butler (2013)
- Lee Rock (1991)
- Lee Rock II (1991)
- Leech (2025)
- The Leech: (1921, 1956 & 2022)
- Leeches! (2003)
- Leena (2019)
- Left Bank (2008)
- Left Behind series:
  - Left Behind (2014)
  - Left Behind: The Movie (2000)
  - Left Behind: World at War (2005)
  - Left Behind II: Tribulation Force (2002)
- The Left Hand of God (1955)
- Left Luggage (1998)
- Left-Hander (1964)
- The Left-Hander (1987)
- The Left Handed Gun (1958)
- Left Right and Centre (1959)
- Left Right Left (2013)
- Left Right Sir (2004)
- Leg (1991)
- The Leg Fighters (1980)
- Legacy: (1998, 2000, 2008 & 2010)
- The Legacy: (1978 & 2009)
- Legacy of the 500,000 (1963)
- Legacy of Lies (2020)
- The Legacy of Pretoria (1934)
- Legacy of Rage (1986)
- The Legacy of a Whitetail Deer Hunter (2018)
- Legacy: A Mormon Journey (1990)
- Legal Eagles (1986)
- Legal Marriage (1985)
- Legal Tender (1991)
- Legally Blonde series:
  - Legally Blonde (2001)
  - Legally Blonde 2: Red, White & Blonde (2003)
  - Legally Blondes (2009)
- Legally Dead (1923)
- Legend: (1985, 2014 & 2015)
- The Legend (2012)
- The Legend of the 7 Golden Vampires (1974)
- The Legend of 1900 (1998)
- Legend of the Ancient Sword (2018)
- The Legend of Bagger Vance (2000)
- The Legend of Billie Jean (1985)
- The Legend of Boggy Creek (1972)
- The Legend of Buddha (2004)
- Legend of the Demon Cat (2017)
- Legend of Destruction (2021)
- Legend of Dinosaurs & Monster Birds (1977)
- Legend of the Guardians: The Owls of Ga'Hoole (2010)
- The Legend of Hell House (1973)
- The Legend of Hercules (2014)
- The Legend of the Holy Drinker (1988)
- The Legend Hunters (2025)
- The Legend of the Lone Ranger (1981)
- Legend of the Lost (1957)
- Legend of the Moles series:
  - Legend of the Moles: The Frozen Horror (2011)
  - Legend of the Moles: The Treasure of Scylla (2012)
  - Legend of the Moles – The Magic Train Adventure (2015)
- Legend of the Mountain (1979)
- The Legend of Ochi (2025)
- Legend of the Phantom Rider (2002)
- Legend of a Rabbit: The Martial of Fire (2015)
- The Legend of Rita (2000)
- The Legend of Silent Night (1968) (TV)
- The Legend of Sleepy Hollow: (1949 & 1980 TV)
- The Legend of Suram Fortress (1985)
- The Legend of Suriyothai (2001)
- Legend of Tianyun Mountain (1980)
- Legend of the Werewolf (1975)
- The Legend of the White Serpent (1956)
- The Legend of Zorro (2005)
- The Legend of Zu (2001)
- Legendary (2010)
- Legendary Weapons of China (1982)
- Legends of the Condor Heroes: The Gallants (2025)
- Legends of the Fall (1994)
- Legends of Oz: Dorothy's Return (2013)
- Legion: (1998 TV & 2010)
- The Legion (2020)
- Legion of the Dead (2005)
- Legion of the Night (1995)
- Legionnaire (1998)
- Lego series:
  - Lego: The Adventures of Clutch Powers (2010)
  - Lego Batman: The Movie – DC Super Heroes Unite (2013)
  - The Lego Movie (2014)
  - Lego DC Comics Super Heroes: Justice League vs. Bizarro League (2015)
  - Lego DC Comics Super Heroes: Justice League – Attack of the Legion of Doom (2015)
  - Lego DC Comics Super Heroes: Justice League – Cosmic Clash (2016)
  - Lego Scooby-Doo! Haunted Hollywood (2016)
  - Lego DC Comics Super Heroes: Justice League – Gotham City Breakout (2016)
  - The Lego Batman Movie (2017)
  - Lego Scooby-Doo! Blowout Beach Bash (2017)
  - Lego DC Super Hero Girls: Brain Drain (2017)
  - The Lego Ninjago Movie (2017)
  - Lego DC Comics Super Heroes: The Flash (2018)
  - Lego DC Super Hero Girls: Super-Villain High (2018)
  - Lego DC Comics Super Heroes: Aquaman – Rage of Atlantis (2018)
  - The Lego Movie 2: The Second Part (2019)
  - Lego DC Batman: Family Matters (2019)
  - Lego DC Shazam! Magic and Monsters (2020)
- Legong: Dance of the Virgins (1935)
- Leif (1987)
- Leila (1997)
- Leila and Gábor (1956)
- Leila and the Wolves (1984)
- Leily Is with Me (1996)
- Leisure (1976)
- The Leisure Class (2015)
- The Leisure Seeker (2017)
- Leiutajateküla Lotte (2006)
- Lejos de casa: éxodo venezolano (2020)
- Lek Chalali Sasarla (1984)
- Lekar Hum Deewana Dil (2014)
- Lekh (2022)
- Lel Chamel (2010)
- Lelíček in the Services of Sherlock Holmes (1932)
- Lemke's Widow: (1928 & 1957)
- Lemming (2006)
- Lemmy (2010)
- Lemon: (1969, 2013 & 2017)
- The Lemon Drop Kid (1951)
- Lemon and Poppy Seed Cake (2021)
- Lemon Popsicle (1978)
- Lemon Tree: (2008 & 2023)
- Lemon Tree Passage (2014)
- Lemonade: (2016 TV & 2018)
- Lemonade Joe (1964)
- Lemonade Mouth (2011) (TV)
- Lemony Snicket's A Series of Unfortunate Events (2004)
- Lemora (1973)

==== Len–Les ====
- Lena (2001)
- Lena Rivers: (1910, 1914 Cosmos, 1914 Whitman, 1925 & 1932)
- Lend a Paw (1941)
- Lend Me Your Husband: (1924 & 1935)
- Lend Me Your Voice (2021)
- Lend Me Your Wife (1935)
- Leni Riefenstahl: Her Dream of Africa (2003)
- Lenin in Paris (1981)
- Leningrad Cowboys Go America (1989)
- Lenny (1974)
- Lenny Cooke (2013)
- Leo: (2000, 2002, 2012, 2023 American & 2023 Indian)
- Leo & Claire (2001)
- Leo Da Vinci: Mission Mona Lisa (2018)
- Leo the Last (1970)
- Leo the Lion (2005)
- Leo and Loree (1980)
- Léolo (1992)
- Léon Morin, Priest (1961)
- Leon the Pig Farmer (1992)
- Léon: The Professional (1994)
- Leona (2018)
- Leonard Cohen: Bird on a Wire (1974)
- Leonard Cohen: I'm Your Man (2005)
- Leonard Part 6 (1987)
- Leonardo da Vinci (2024)
- Leonardo's Diary (1972)
- Leonie (2010)
- Léonor (1975)
- Leonor Will Never Die (2022)
- The Leopard: (1918 & 1963)
- Leopard Do Not Bite (2015)
- The Leopard Man (1943)
- Leopard in the Snow (1978)
- Leopardi (2014)
- Lepa Brena: Godine Slatkog greha (2017)
- Lepel (2005)
- Leprechaun series:
  - Leprechaun (1993)
  - Leprechaun 2 (1994)
  - Leprechaun 3 (1995)
  - Leprechaun 4: In Space (1997)
  - Leprechaun in the Hood (2000)
  - Leprechaun: Back 2 tha Hood (2003)
  - Leprechaun: Origins (2014)
  - Leprechaun Returns (2018)
- Leptirica (1973) (TV)
- Lermontov (1986)
- Leroy & Stitch (2006) (TV)
- Lesbian Harem (1987)
- Lesbian Space Princess (2025)
- Lesbian Vampire Killers (2009)
- Less Than the Dust (1916)
- Less Than Kin (1918)
- Less than Zero (1987)
- The Lesser Evil: (1912 & 1998)
- Lesson of the Evil (2012)
- Lessons in Chocolate (2007)
- Lessons in Conduct (1946)
- Lessons of Darkness (1992)
- Lessons in Dissent (2014)
- Lessons of a Dream (2011)
- Lessons in Forgetting (2012)
- Lessons Learned (2014)
- Lessons on Life (1989)
- Lessons in Love (1921)
- Lessons from a School Shooting: Notes from Dunblane (2018)
- Lest We Forget: (1918, 1934, 1935 & 1947)

==== Let–Lez ====
- Let the Corpses Tan (2017)
- Let George Do It! (1940)
- Let Him Go (2020)
- Let Him Have It (1992)
- Let Hoi Decide (2014)
- Let It Be (1970)
- Let It Ride (1989)
- Let It Shine (2012)
- Let It Snow: (2001, 2019 & 2020)
- Let Me Die a Woman (1978)
- Let Me In (2010)
- Let Me Make You a Martyr (2016)
- Let the Right One In (2008)
- Let Sleeping Corpses Lie (1974)
- Let the Sunshine In (2017)
- Let Them All Talk (2020)
- Let Them Chirp Awhile (2009)
- Let Us In (2021)
- Let Us Prey (2014)
- Let's All Go to the Lobby (1957)
- Let's All Hate Toronto (2007)
- Let's Be Cops (2014)
- Let's Be Daring, Madame (1957)
- Let's Be Evil (2016)
- Let's Be Famous (1939)
- Let's Be Fashionable (1920)
- Let's Be Friends (2005)
- Let's Be Happy (1957)
- Let's Be Ritzy (1934)
- Let's Dance: (1950, 2007, 2009 & 2019)
- Let's Do It Again: (1953 & 1975)
- Let's Eat! (2016)
- Let's Elope (1919)
- Let's Face It (1943)
- Let's Fall in Love (1933)
- Let's Get Harry (1986)
- Let's Get Laid (1978)
- Let's Get Lost: (1988 & 1997)
- Let's Get Married: (1926, 1931, 1937, 1960, 2015 & 2023)
- Let's Get Skase (2001)
- Let's Go Crazy (1951)
- Let's Go to Prison (2006)
- Let's Kill Uncle (1966)
- Let's Make Love (1960)
- Let's Make a Movie (2010)
- Let's Scare Jessica to Death (1971)
- Lethal Weapon series:
  - Lethal Weapon (1987)
  - Lethal Weapon 2 (1989)
  - Lethal Weapon 3 (1992)
  - Lethal Weapon 4 (1998)
- The Letter: (1929 & 1940)
- Letter to Brezhnev (1985)
- Letter with Feather (1954)
- Letter to Jane (1972)
- The Letter for the King (2008)
- Letter Never Sent (1960)
- The Letter Room (2020)
- A Letter to Three Wives (1949)
- Letter from an Unknown Woman: (1948 & 2004)
- Letters from Iwo Jima (2006)
- Letters to Juliet (2010)
- Lettre à la prison (1969)
- Leuchtturm des Chaos (1983)
- Lev Tolstoy (1984)
- Lev Tolstoy and the Russia of Nicholas II (1928)
- Lev Yashin. The Goalee of My Dreams (2019)
- Level 16 (2018)
- Level Cross (2024)
- Level Five (1997)
- Level Up (2016)
- The Levelling (2016)
- Levels (2024)
- The Levenger Tapes (2011)
- Levers (2025)
- Levi (2019)
- Leviathan: (1989, 2012 & 2014)
- Levitating (2026)
- Levitation (1997)
- Leviticus (2026)
- Levity (2003)
- Levy and Company (1930)
- The Levy Department Stores (1932)
- Lew Tyler's Wives (1926)
- Lewis and Clark and George (1997)
- Lewis & Clark: Great Journey West (2002)
- Lex and Rory (1993)
- Ley Lines (1999)
- Ley's Line (2002)
- Leyendas series:
  - La leyenda de la Nahuala (2007)
  - La leyenda de la Llorona (2011)
  - La leyenda de las Momias (2014)
  - La leyenda del Chupacabras (2016)
  - La leyenda del Charro Negro (2018)
  - Las leyendas: el origen (2022)
  - La leyenda de los Chaneques (2023)
- Leylak (2021)
- Leysa Leysa (2002)
- Lezioni di violoncello con toccata e fuga (1976)

=== Li ===
- Li chiamarono... briganti! (1999)
- Li Lianying: The Imperial Eunuch (1991)

==== Lia–Lie ====
- Les Liaisons dangereuses (1959)
- Li'l Abner: (1940 & 1959)
- Liam: (2000 & 2018)
- Liane, Jungle Goddess (1956)
- Lianna (1983)
- Liar Liar (1997)
- Liar, Liar (1993 TV)
- Liar, Liar, Vampire (2015 TV)
- Liar Wanted (1961)
- Liar's Dice (2013)
- Liar's Moon (1981)
- Liars All (2013)
- Libby, Montana (2004)
- Libel (1959)
- Libeled Lady (1936)
- Libera (1993)
- Libera Me (2000)
- Liberace: Behind the Music (1988 TV)
- Liberal Arts (2012)
- The Liberation of L.B. Jones (1970)
- Liberté (2019)
- Liberté I (1962)
- The Libertine: (2000 & 2005)
- Liberty: (1929 & 1986 TV)
- Liberty Heights (1999)
- Liberty! The American Revolution (1997) (TV)
- Libido: (1965, 1973 & 2013)
- The Librarian series:
  - The Librarian: Quest for the Spear (2004) (TV)
  - The Librarian: Return to King Solomon's Mines (2006) (TV)
  - The Librarian: Curse of the Judas Chalice (2008) (TV)
- The Librarians (2003)
- Library Wars (2013)
- Library Wars: The Last Mission (2015)
- Licántropo (1996)
- Lice (TBD)
- Licence to Kill (1989)
- License (2023)
- License to Drive (1988)
- License to Kill (1984 TV)
- License to Wed (2007)
- Lick the Star (1998)
- Licorice Pizza (2021)
- Lidice (2011)
- Lie (2017)
- Lie Down With Dogs (1995)
- Lie Exposed (2019)
- Lie with Me: (2005 & 2022)
- Liebestraum (1991)
- Lies (1999)
- Lies Before Kisses (1991)
- Lies My Mother Told Me (2005 TV)

==== Lif ====
- Life: (1999 & 2017)
- Life 101 (1995)
- The Life and Adventures of Nicholas Nickleby: (1947, 1982 & 2001 TV)
- The Life and Adventures of Santa Claus: (1985 TV & 2000)
- Life After Beth (2014)
- The Life Ahead (2020)
- The Life Aquatic with Steve Zissou (2004)
- Life is Beautiful: (1979, 1985, 1997, 2000, 2012 & 2014)
- Life Is a Bed of Roses (1983)
- The Life Before Her Eyes (2007)
- The Life Before This (1999)
- Life Between the Waters (2017)
- Life of Brian (1979)
- The Life of Buddha (2007)
- Life Is Cheap... But Toilet Paper Is Expensive (1989)
- Life Is Cool (2008)
- Life Could Be a Dream (2026)
- Life Dances On (1937)
- The Life of David Gale (2003)
- Life in a Day: (1999 & 2011)
- Life in a Day 2020 (2021)
- The Life and Death of 9413: a Hollywood Extra (1928)
- The Life and Death of Colonel Blimp (1943)
- The Life and Death of King Richard II (1960) (TV)
- The Life and Death of Peter Sellers (2004)
- The Life and Death of a Porno Gang (2009)
- Life During Wartime (2009)
- The Life of Emile Zola (1937)
- Life at the End of the Rainbow (2002)
- Life of an Expert Swordsman (1959)
- Life and Extraordinary Adventures of Private Ivan Chonkin (1994)
- Life with Father (1947)
- Life With Feathers (1945)
- Life in a Fishbowl (2014)
- Life as a House (2001)
- Life Itself: (2014 & 2018)
- A Life Less Ordinary (1997)
- The Life List (2025)
- Life Is a Long Quiet River (1988)
- Life with Mikey (1993)
- Life Is a Miracle (2004)
- Life and Nothing But (1989)
- The Life of Oharu (1952)
- Life of Pi (2012)
- Life of Riley (2014)
- The Life of Riley: (1927 & 1949)
- Life Show (2002)
- Life or Something Like It (2002)
- A Life at Stake (1954)
- Life Stinks (1991)
- Life Story (1987) (TV)
- Life on a String (1991)
- Life on the Murder Scene (2006)
- Life is Sweet (1990)
- The Life and Times of Grizzly Adams (1974)
- The Life and Times of Judge Roy Bean (1972)
- The Life and Times of Rosie the Riveter (1980)
- The Life and Times of Sarah Baartman (1998)
- The Life and Times of Xaviera Hollander (1974)
- Life Is Tough, Eh Providence? (1972)
- Life as We Know It (2010)
- Life Without Dick (2001)
- The Life of Wu Xun (1950)
- Life, and Nothing More... (1992)
- Life-Size (2000) (TV)
- Lifeboat (1944)
- Lifechanger (2018)
- Lifeforce (1985)
- The Lifeguard (2013)
- Lifeline (2025)

==== Lig ====
- Ligabue (1978)
- Liger (2022)
- The Light Between Oceans (2016)
- Light Blast (1985)
- Light Cavalry: (1927, 1935 French & 1935 German)
- Light in the Dark (2019)
- Light in the Darkness (1941)
- Light of Day (1987)
- Light Fingers (1929)
- Light the Fuse... Sartana Is Coming (1970)
- Light of Heart (1943)
- Light in the High Plains (1953)
- Light of His Life (1921)
- Light House (1976)
- Light of India (1929)
- Light It Up (1999)
- Light from Light (2019)
- Light of My Eyes (2001)
- Light of My Life (2019)
- Light in the Piazza (1962)
- Light Sleeper (1992)
- Light Up (2024)
- Light Up the Sky! (1960)
- Light and the Sufferer (2007)
- Light in the Window (1952)
- Light of the World (2025)
- Light Years (2015)
- The Light Years (1988)
- Light Years Away (1981)
- Lighter Than Hare (1960)
- The Lighthorsemen (1987)
- Lighthouse (1947)
- Lighthouse (1999)
- The Lighthouse: (1998, 2016 & 2019)
- Lighthouse Hill (2004)
- Lighthouse Mouse (1955)
- Lighting Up the Stars (2022)
- Lightman (2017)
- Lightnin' (1925)
- Lightnin' (1930)
- Lightnin' Bill Carson (1936)
- Lightnin' Crandall (1937)
- Lightnin' Shot (1928)
- Lightnin' Smith Returns (1931)
- Lightning (1925)
- Lightning Jack (1994)
- Lightning Over Water (1980)
- Lights of the Desert (1922)
- Lights in the Dusk (2006)
- Lights from the East: I Am Maluku (2014)
- Lights of New York: (1916 & 1928)
- Lights of Old Broadway (1925)
- Lights of Old Santa Fe (1944)
- Lights Out: (1923, 1953, 2010, 2013, 2016 & 2024)
- Lights of Paris (1938)
- Lights on the River (1954)
- Lights and Shadows (1914)
- Lights and Shadows (1988)
- Lightspeed (2006)
- Lightweight (2004)
- Lightyear (2022)

==== Lik ====
- Like Aani Subscribe (2024)
- Like Asura (2003)
- Like Cotton Twines (2016)
- Like Crazy (2011)
- Like Crazy (2016)
- Like Dandelion Dust (2009)
- Like Dogs (2021)
- Like Father (2018)
- Like Father, Like Santa (1998) (TV)
- Like Father Like Son (1987)
- Like Father Like Son (2025)
- Like Father, Like Son (1961)
- Like Father, Like Son (2013)
- Like Grains of Sand (1995)
- Like It Is (1998)
- Like It Never Was Before (1995)
- Like Knights of Old (1912)
- Like Lambs (2016)
- Like for Likes (2016)
- Like Me (2017)
- Like Me a Million (2019)
- Like Mike (2002)
- Like Mike 2: Streetball (2006)
- Like Minds (2006)
- Like. Share. Follow. (2017)
- Like, Share & Subscribe (2022)
- Like Someone in Love (2012)
- Like Stars on Earth (2007)
- Like Sunday, Like Rain (2014)
- Like a Prince (2023)
- Like a Virgin (2006)
- Like Water for Chocolate (1992)
- The Likely Lads (1976)

==== Lil ====
- Lil' Pimp (2005)
- Lila & Eve (2015)
- Lila Says (2004)
- Lila's Book (2017)
- Lilac (1932)
- Lilac Time (1928)
- Lilacs in the Spring (1954)
- Lili (1917)
- Lili (1953)
- Lili Marleen (1981)
- Lilies (1996)
- Lilies of the Field (1924)
- Lilies of the Field (1930)
- Lilies of the Field (1934)
- Lilies of the Field (1963)
- Lilies of the Ghetto (2009)
- Lilies Not for Me (2024)
- Lilies of the Streets (1925)
- Lilim (2025)
- Liliom (1930)
- Liliom (1934)
- Liliomfi (1954)
- Lilith (1964)
- Lilith Fair: Building a Mystery (2025)
- Lilith and Ly (1919)
- Lilkee (2006)
- Lilla Jönssonligan series:
  - Lilla Jönssonligan och cornflakeskuppen (1996)
  - Lilla Jönssonligan på styva linan (1997)
  - Lilla Jönssonligan på kollo (2004)
- Lilla Märta kommer tillbaka (1948)
- Lilli (1919)
- Lilli (1958)
- Lilli (2018)
- Lilli Marlene (1950)
- Lilli's Marriage (1919)
- Lillian (2019)
- Lillian Gish in a Liberty Loan Appeal (1918)
- Lillian Russell (1940)
- Lillo of the Sulu Seas (1916)
- Lilly (1958)
- Lilly (2024)
- Lilly the Witch: The Dragon and the Magic Book (2009)
- Lilly the Witch: The Journey to Mandolan (2011)
- Lilja 4-ever (2002)
- Lilo & Scratch (2026)
- Lilo & Stitch (2002 & 2025)
- Lilo & Stitch 2: Stitch Has a Glitch (2005)
- Lilting (2014)
- Liludi Dharati (1968)
- Lily (2013)
- Lily (2023)
- Lily, aime-moi (1975)
- Lily of the Alley (1924)
- Lily of the Dust (1924)
- Lily van Java (1928)
- Lily and Jim (1997)
- Lily & Kat (2015)
- Lily of Killarney (1929)
- Lily of Killarney (1934)
- Lily of Laguna (1938)
- Lily in Love (1984)
- Lily Topples the World (2021)
- Lily Was Here (1989)

==== Lim ====
- Lima: Breaking the Silence (1999)
- Lima Is Burning (2023)
- Limbo (1972)
- Limbo (1999)
- Limbo (2010)
- Limbo (2020)
- Limbo (2021)
- Limbo (2023)
- The Limbo Line (1968)
- The Limehouse Golem (2016)
- The Limejuice Mystery or Who Spat in Grandfather's Porridge? (1930)
- Limelight (1936)
- Limelight (1952)
- Limelight (2011)
- The Limey (1999)
- Liminal (TBD)
- Limit (2022)
- The Limit (1972)
- The Limit is Just Me (2022)
- The Limit Of (2018)
- Limit Is the Sky (2016)
- Limit of Love: Umizaru (2006)
- Limit Up (1989)
- Limite (1931)
- The Limited Mail (1925)
- Limited Partnership (2014)
- Limitless (2011)
- The Limits of Control (2009)
- Limonov: The Ballad (2024)
- A Limousine the Colour of Midsummer's Eve (1981)
- The Limping Man (1936)
- The Limping Man (1953)

==== Lin ====
- Lina from Lima (2019)
- Lina's Wedding (1973)
- Lincoln: (1988 TV & 2012)
- The Lincoln Conspiracy (1977)
- The Lincoln Cycle (1917)
- The Lincoln Highwayman (1919)
- The Lincoln Lawyer (2011)
- Lincoln in the White House (1939)
- Linda (1929)
- Linda (1960)
- Linda (1973) (TV)
- Linda (1993) (TV)
- Linda, Be Good (1947)
- The Linda James Case (2023)
- The Linda McCartney Story (2000) (TV)
- Linda Ronstadt: The Sound of My Voice (2019)
- The Lindbergh Kidnapping Case (1976) (TV)
- Linden Lady on the Rhine (1927)
- The Line (1938)
- The Line (2009)
- The Line (2017)
- The Line (2022)
- The Line (2023)
- Line of Credit (2014)
- The Line, the Cross and the Curve (1993)
- Line of Demarcation (1966)
- Line of Descent (2019)
- Line of Duty (2019)
- Line of Fire (2022)
- Line of Fire: The Morris Dees Story (1991 TV)
- The Line of Freedom (2013)
- The Line King: The Al Hirschfeld Story (1996)
- Line Walker (2016)
- Line Walker 2: Invisible Spy (2019)
- The Line-Up (1934)
- Linear (2009)
- Lines (2016)
- Lines of Escape (2022)
- Lines of Wellington (2012)
- The Lineup (1958)
- Lingababu Love Story (1995)
- Linger (2008)
- Lingerie (1928)
- La Lingerie (2008)
- Lingering (2020)
- A Lingering Face (2000)
- Lingua Franca (2019)
- Lingui, The Sacred Bonds (2021)
- The Linguini Incident (1991)
- Link (1986)
- The Link and the Chain (1963)
- Linked by Fate (1919)
- Links of Justice (1958)
- Lino (2017)
- Linoleum (2022)
- Linsanity (2013)

==== Lio–Liq ====
- Liolà (1963)
- Lion (2006)
- Lion (2014)
- Lion (2015)
- Lion (2016)
- The Lion (1962)
- The Lion of Amalfi (1950)
- Lion Around (1950)
- Lion of the Desert (1981)
- Lion Down (1951)
- Lion of Gujarat (2015)
- The Lion Has Wings (1939)
- A Lion in the House (2006)
- A Lion Is in the Streets (1953)
- Lion Jagapathi Rao (1991)
- The Lion King series:
  - The Lion King: (1994 & 2019)
  - The Lion King II: Simba's Pride (1998)
  - The Lion King 1½ (2004)
- Lion of Oz (2000)
- The Lion of Punjab (2011)
- A Lion Returns (2020)
- A Lion in Town (1959)
- The Lion in Winter: (1968 & 2003 TV)
- The Lion Woman (2016)
- The Lion's Bride (1913)
- The Lion's Busy (1950)
- The Lion's Claws (1918)
- Lion's Den (1988)
- Lion's Den (2008)
- The Lion's Den (1919)
- The Lion's Den (1936)
- Lion's Heart (1972)
- The Lion's Mouse (1923)
- The Lion's Mouth (2000)
- The Lion's Mouth Opens (2014)
- A Lion's Trail (2002)
- Lioness (2008)
- Lionheart (1968)
- Lionheart (1987)
- Lionheart (1990)
- Lionheart (2016)
- Lionheart (2018)
- Lions for Breakfast (1975)
- Lions and Ladies (1919)
- Lions for Lambs (2007)
- Lions Love (1969)
- Lip Service (1988) (TV)
- Lip Service (2000) (TV)
- The Lips (2010)
- Lips of Blood (1975)
- Lips of Lurid Blue (1975)
- Lipstick (1960)
- Lipstick (1976)
- Lipstick and Dynamite, Piss and Vinegar: The First Ladies of Wrestling (20040
- Lipstick Under My Burkha (2016)
- Liquid Bridge (2003)
- Liquid Dreams (1991)
- Liquid Sky (1982)
- Liquid Time (2002)
- The Liquidator (1965)
- The Liquidator (2017)
- Liquor Store Dreams (2022)

==== Lis ====
- Lisa: (1978, 1990 & 2001)
- Lisa and the Devil (1974)
- Lisa Frankenstein (2024)
- Lisa Picard Is Famous (2000)
- Lisaa (2019)
- Lisabi: A Legend Is Born (2025)
- Lisabi: The Uprising (2024)
- Lisammayude Veedu (2013)
- Lisbela e o Prisioneiro (2003)
- Lisbon: (1956 & 1999)
- Lisbon Story: (1946 & 1994)
- Lise kommer til Byen (1947)
- Liselotte of the Palatinate (1966)
- Lisik: Origin Point (2025)
- Lisinski (1944)
- Lissi und der wilde Kaiser (2007)
- Lissy (1957)
- The List of Adrian Messenger (1963)
- Listen (1996)
- Listen (2013)
- Listen (2020)
- Listen... Amaya (2013)
- Listen Before You Sing (2021)
- Listen to Britain (1942)
- Listen to the City (1984)
- Listen, Darling (1938)
- Listen, Judge (1952)
- Listen Lena (1927)
- Listen Lester (1924)
- Listen, Let's Make Love (1969)
- Listen to the Lion (1977)
- Listen to Me (1989)
- Listen to Me Marlon (2015)
- Listen to My Heart (2009)
- Listen to My Song (1959)
- Listen Up Philip (2014)
- Listen to the Voices of the Sea (1950)
- Listen to Your Heart (1983) (TV)
- Listen to Your Heart (2010)
- Listening (2003)
- The Listening (2006)
- Listening to Kenny G (2021)
- Listers: A Glimpse Into Extreme Birdwatching (20250
- Lisztomania (1975)
- Lisístrata (2002)

==== Lit ====
- Le Lit (1982)
- Little Ashes (2009)
- The Little Bear Movie (2001)
- Little Big League (1994)
- Little Big Man (1970)
- Little Big Panda (2011)
- A Little Bit of Heaven (2011)
- Little Black Book (2004)
- Little Boy Lost: (1953 & 1978)
- Little Buddha (1993)
- Little Caesar (1931)
- A Little Chaos (2014)
- Little Children (2006)
- Little Cigars (1973)
- Little Darlings (1980)
- The Little Death: (2006 & 2014)
- Little Deaths (2011)
- Little Dieter Needs to Fly (1997)
- Little Dorrit: (1920, 1924, 1934 & 1987)
- Little Dragon Maiden (1983)
- The Little Drummer Boy (1968) (TV)
- The Little Drummer Girl (1984)
- The Little Engine That Could: (1991 & 2011)
- Little England (2013)
- Little Fauss and Big Halsy (1970)
- Little Fish: (2005 & 2020)
- Little Fockers (2010)
- The Little Foxes (1941)
- Little Fugitive: (1953, 1966 & 2006)
- Little Giants (1994)
- Little Girl Blue (2023)
- The Little Girl Who Lives Down the Lane (1976)
- The Little Hours (2017)
- The Little House (2014)
- The Little House in Kolomna (1913)
- The Little Hut (1957)
- Little John (2002)
- Little Ladies of the Night (1977) (TV)
- Little Man: (2005 & 2006)
- Little Man Tate (1991)
- Little Man, What Now?: (1933 & 1934)
- Little Manhattan (2005)
- The Little Mermaid: (1968, 1976 Czech, 1976 Russian & 2018)
- The Little Mermaid series:
  - The Little Mermaid: (1989 & 2023)
  - The Little Mermaid II: Return to the Sea (2000)
  - The Little Mermaid: Ariel's Beginning (2008)
- Little Miss Marker: (1934 & 1980)
- Little Miss Millions (1993)
- Little Miss Nobody: (1917, 1923, 1933 & 1936)
- Little Miss Sunshine (2006)
- Little Monsters: (1989 & 2019)
- Little Moth (2007)
- Little Murder (2011)
- Little Murders (1971)
- Little Nellie Kelly (1940)
- Little Nemo (1911)
- Little Nemo: Adventures in Slumberland (1989)
- Little Nicky (2000)
- Little Odessa (1994)
- The Little Panda Fighter (2008)
- A Little Pond (2009)
- A Little Prayer (2023)
- Little Prince (2008)
- The Little Prince: (1966, 1974 & 2015)
- A Little Princess: (1917, 1939, 1995 & 1997)
- The Little Rascals (1994)
- The Little Rascals Save the Day (2014)
- Little Red Flowers (2006)
- Little Red Monkey (1955)
- Little Red Riding Hood: (1920, 1922, 1953, 1954 & 1997)
- Little Red Riding Rabbit (1944)
- Little Red Wagon (2012)
- A Little Romance (1979)
- Little Secrets: (2001 & 2006)
- The Little Shop of Horrors (1960)
- Little Shop of Horrors (1986)
- Little Stranger (1934)
- The Little Stranger (2018)
- The Little Theatre of Jean Renoir (1970)
- The Little Thing: (1923 & 1938)
- Little Things (2014)
- The Little Things: (2010 & 2021)
- Little Toys (1933)
- A Little Trip to Heaven (2005)
- The Little Vampire (2000)
- The Little Vampire 3D (2017)
- Little Vera (1988)
- Little Voice (1998)
- Little Witches (1996)
- Little Women: (1917, 1918, 1933, 1949, 1978 TV, 1994, 2018 & 2019)
- The Littlest Victims (1989)

==== Liu–Liz ====
- Liu yue xin niang (1960)
- Live! (2007)
- Live Action Toy Story (2012)
- Live Again, Die Again (1974 TV)
- Live at the Aladdin Las Vegas (2003)
- Live Animals (2008)
- Live from Baghdad (2002) (TV)
- Live Bait (1995)
- Live Cargo (2016)
- Live Dangerously (1944)
- Live Evil (2009)
- Live Fast, Die Young (1958)
- Live Feed (2006)
- Live Flesh (1998)
- Live Forever: The Rise and Fall of Brit Pop (2003)
- Live Freaky! Die Freaky! (2006)
- Live Free or Die: (2000 & 2006)
- Live Free or Die Hard (2007)
- Live Hard (1989)
- Live and Let Die (1973)
- Live Like a Cop, Die Like a Man (1976)
- Live a Little, Love a Little (1968)
- Live Nude Girls (1995)
- Live Wire (1992)
- Liverpool: (2008 & 2012)
- The Lives of a Bengal Lancer (1935)
- The Lives of Others (2006)
- Living: (2012 & 2022)
- The Living Daylights (1987)
- The Living Dead at Manchester Morgue (1974)
- The Living Desert (1953)
- The Living Idol (1957)
- Living it Up (1954)
- Living in Oblivion (1995)
- Living Out Loud (1998)
- Living on Tokyo Time (1987)
- Livvakterna (2001)
- Liza (1972)
- Liza, the Fox-Fairy (2015)
- The Lizard (2004)
- A Lizard in a Woman's Skin (1973)
- The Lizzie McGuire Movie (2003)

=== Lj–Ll ===
- Ljeto u zlatnoj dolini (2003)
- Ljubav i drugi zločini (2008)
- Llévame contigo (1951)
- La Llorona: (1933, 1960 & 2019)
- Lloyd (2001)
- Lloyd the Conqueror (2011)
- Lloyd's of London (1936)

=== Lo ===
- Lo (2009)
- Lo and Behold, Reveries of the Connected World (2016)

==== Loa–Loc ====
- Loabeega Aniyaa (1997)
- Loabeege Thoofan (1991)
- Loabi '90 (1990)
- Loabi Nuvevununama (2002)
- Loabi Veveynee Furaana Dheegen (1992)
- Loabi Vevijje (2023)
- Loabin...? (2025)
- Load Wedding (2018)
- Loaded: (1994 & 2008)
- Loaded Guns (1975)
- Loaded Pistols (1948)
- Loaded Weapon 1 (1993)
- Loafer: (1973, 1996 & 2015)
- Loafing and Camouflage (1984)
- Loafing and Camouflage: Sirens at Land (2011)
- Loafing and Camouflage: Sirens in the Aegean (2005)
- Loaiybahtakaa (2009)
- Loan Shark (1952)
- Loanshark (1999)
- Loathe Thy Neighbor (2025)
- Lobby (2025)
- Lobola Man (2024)
- Lobster for Breakfast (1979)
- Lobster Man from Mars (1989)
- Lobsters (1936)
- LOC: Kargil (2003)
- Loca por el trabajo (2018)
- Local Boy Makes Good (1931)
- Local Boys (2002)
- Local Color (2006)
- Local Hero (1983)
- Local Kung Fu series:
  - Local Kung Fu (2013)
  - Local Kung Fu 2 (2017)
  - Local Kung Fu 3 (2024)
- Local & Sweet (1950)
- Local Utpaat (2022)
- Location Africa (1987)
- Loch Ness (1996)
- Loch Ness Terror (2008 TV)
- Locha Laapsi (2024)
- Lochya Zaala Re (2022)
- Lock (2016)
- Lock Charmer (2014)
- Lock, Stock and Two Smoking Barrels (1998)
- Lock Up: (1989 & 2020)
- Lock Up Your Daughters: (1959 & 1969)
- Lockbox (2026)
- Lockdown: (1990, 2000, 2021 Bengali, 2021 English, 2021 Nigerian, 2022 & 2025)
- Locke (2013)
- Locked (2025)
- Locked Doors (1925)
- Locked Down (2021)
- Locked In: (2010 & 2023)
- Locked Lips (1920)
- Locked Out (2006)
- Locked Up: A Mother's Rage (1991 TV)
- Locked-in Society (2022)
- Locker (2023)
- Locker 13 (2009)
- Locker Sixty-Nine (1962)
- Locket (1986)
- Lockout (2012)
- Locksmith and Chancellor (1923)
- Lockup Death (1994)
- Loco Boy Makes Good (1942)
- Loco Luck (1927)
- Loco por ellas (1965)
- Locos de amor series:
  - Locos de amor (2016)
  - Locos de amor 2 (2018)
  - Locos de amor 3 (2020)
  - Locos de amor: mi primer amor (2025)
- Locos por la música (1980)
- Locos sueltos en el zoo (2015)
- Locuras, tiros y mambos (1951)
- Locust: (2015 & 2024)
- Locusts: (2005 & 2019)
- Locusts: The 8th Plague (2005 TV)
- The Locusts (1997)

==== Lod–Lol ====
- The Lodge (2019)
- Lodge Night (1923)
- The Lodger: (1932, 1944 & 2009)
- The Lodger: A Story of the London Fog (1927)
- Lodz Ghetto (1988)
- Loffe as a Millionaire (1948)
- Loffe the Tramp (1948)
- Loft: (2005, 2008 & 2010)
- The Loft (2014)
- Log Kya Kahenge (1982)
- Logan (2017)
- Logan Lucky (2017)
- Logan's Run (1976)
- Logan's War: Bound by Honor (1998 TV)
- Loggerheads: (1978 & 2005)
- Login (2012)
- Logistics (2012)
- Logout (2025)
- Loha: (1987 & 1997)
- Loie Fuller (1902)
- Loin (2001)
- Loitering with Intent (2014)
- Lokaneethi (1952)
- Lokis (1970)
- Lokpal (2013)
- Lokshahi (2024)
- Lokshahir Ram Joshi (1947)
- Loktak Lairembee (2016)
- LOL: (2006 & 2012)
- LOL (Laughing Out Loud) (2008)
- Lola: (1961, 1969, 1974, 1981 & 2024)
- Lola Montès (1955)
- Lola, the Movie (2007)
- Lola Versus (2012)
- Lola's Last Letter (2015)
- Lolita: (1962 & 1997)
- LolliLove (2004)
- The Lollipop Generation (2008)

==== Lon–Lor ====
- London: (1926, 2005 American & 2005 Indian)
- London After Midnight (1927)
- London Boulevard (2010)
- London to Brighton (2006)
- London Calling (2025)
- London Can Take It! (1940)
- London Fields (2018)
- London Has Fallen (2016)
- London Road (2015)
- London Voodoo (2004)
- London's Trafalgar Square (1890)
- The Lone Ranger: (1956, 2003 TV & 2013)
- The Lone Ranger and the Lost City of Gold (1958)
- Lone River (2009)
- Lone Star: (1952 & 1996)
- Lone Survivor (2013)
- Lone Wolf and Cub series:
  - Lone Wolf and Cub: Baby Cart to Hades (1972)
  - Lone Wolf and Cub: Baby Cart in the Land of Demons (1973)
  - Lone Wolf and Cub: Baby Cart in Peril (1972)
  - Lone Wolf and Cub: Baby Cart at the River Styx (1972)
  - Lone Wolf and Cub: Sword of Vengeance (1972)
  - Lone Wolf and Cub: White Heaven in Hell (1974)
- The Loneliness of the Long Distance Runner (1962)
- Lonely are the Brave (1962)
- The Lonely Guy (1984)
- Lonely Heart: (1981 & 1985)
- Lonely Hearts: (1970, 1982, 1991 & 2006)
- Lonely Island (2014)
- A Lonely Place to Die (2011)
- Lonely Water (1973)
- Lonelyhearts (1958)
- Loner (2008)
- Lonesome (1928)
- Lonesome Cowboys (1968)
- Lonesome Dove (1989)
- Lonesome Jim (2005)
- The Long Absence (1961)
- The Long Breakup (2020)
- The Long Day Closes (1992)
- Long Day's Journey Into Night: (1962, 2018 & 2025)
- The Long Good Friday (1980)
- The Long Goodbye (1973)
- The Long Gray Line (1955)
- The Long Kiss Goodnight (1996)
- Long Live the King: (1923 & 2019)
- Long Live the Queen (1995)
- Long Live the Republic! (1965)
- The Long Night: (1947 & 2022)
- A Long Ride from Hell (1968)
- The Long Riders (1980)
- Long Shadows (2025)
- The Long Ships (1964)
- Long Shot (2019)
- Long Time Dead (2002)
- The Long Voyage Home (1940)
- The Long Walk: (2019 & 2025)
- The Long Walk to Finchley (2008) (TV)
- A Long Way Down (2014)
- Long Way North (2015)
- Long Weekend: (1978, 2008 & 2021)
- The Long, Hot Summer (1958)
- The Long, Long Trailer (1954)
- Long-Haired Hare (1949)
- The Longest Day (1962)
- The Longest Night in Shanghai (2007)
- The Longest Week (2014)
- The Longest Yard: (1974 & 2005)
- Longinus (2004)
- Longlegs (2024)
- Longshot: The Movie (1999)
- Longtime Companion (1989)
- Look Away (2018)
- Look Back in Anger: (1959 & 1980)
- Look Both Ways: (2005 & 2022)
- The Look of Love (2013)
- Look at Me (2004)
- Look for the Silver Lining (1949)
- Look What's Happened to Rosemary's Baby (1976) (TV)
- Look Who's Back (2015)
- Look Who's Talking series:
  - Look Who's Talking (1989)
  - Look Who's Talking Too (1990)
  - Look Who's Talking Now (1993)
- Looker (1981)
- Lookin' to Get Out (1982)
- Looking for Alibrandi (2000)
- Looking for Comedy in the Muslim World (2005)
- Looking for Eric (2009)
- Looking for Fidel (2004)
- Looking for Mr. Goodbar (1977)
- Looking for Oum Kulthum (2017)
- Looking for Richard (1996)
- Looking Through Water (2025)
- The Lookout: (1990, 2007 & 2012)
- Looks That Kill (2020)
- Looney Tunes: Back in Action (2003)
- Loop: (1997, 1999 & 2020)
- Looper (2012)
- Loophole: (1954 & 1981)
- Loot: (1970, 2008, 2011 & 2012)
- Lootera (2013)
- The Looters (1967)
- Lope (2010)
- Loqueesha (2019)
- Lora (2007)
- Lora from Morning Till Evening (2011)
- Lorai: Play to Live (2015)
- The Lorax (2012)
- Lord Arthur Savile's Crime (1920)
- Lord Byron (2011)
- Lord Edgware Dies (1934)
- Lord of the Flies: (1963 & 1990)
- Lord, Give Me Patience (2017)
- Lord of Illusions (1995)
- Lord Jim: (1925 & 1965)
- Lord John in New York (1915)
- Lord of the Jungle (1955)
- Lord and Lady Algy (1919)
- Lord Livingstone 7000 Kandi (2015)
- Lord Love a Duck (1966)
- Lord of the Manor (1933)
- Lord of the Night (1927)
- Lord Reginald's Derby Ride (1924)
- The Lord of the Rings (1978)
- Lord of the Rings series:
  - The Lord of the Rings: The Fellowship of the Ring (2001)
  - The Lord of the Rings: The Return of the King (2003)
  - The Lord of the Rings: The Two Towers (2002)
- The Lord of the Rings: The War of the Rohirrim (2024)
- Lord of Shanghai (2016)
- Lord of Tears (2013)
- Lord of the Universe (1974) (TV)
- Lord of War (2005)
- The Lord's Lantern in Budapest (1999)
- Lords of Chaos (2018)
- Lords of the Deep (1989)
- Lords of Dogtown (2005)
- The Lords of Flatbush (1974)
- The Lords of Salem (2012)
- Lords of the Street (2008)
- Lore (2012)
- Lorelei (2020)
- Lorelei: The Witch of the Pacific Ocean (2005)
- Lorena, Light-Footed Woman (2019)
- Loren Cass (2006)
- Lorenzaccio (1951)
- Lorenzo (2004)
- Lorenzo Ruiz: The Saint... A Filipino (1988)
- Lorenzo's Oil (1992)
- Lorna (1964)
- Lorna's Silence (2008)

==== Los ====
- Los Angeles Plays Itself (2004)
- Loser (1996)
- Loser (2000)
- Loser Love (1999)
- Loser Takes All (1956)
- The Loser Takes It All (2002)
- Loser's End (1935)
- Losers (2015)
- The Losers (2010)
- Losin' It (1983)
- Losing Isaiah (1995)
- The Loss of Sexual Innocence (1999)
- Lost & Found (1999)
- The Lost 15 Boys: The Big Adventure on Pirates' Island (2013)
- Lost in America (1985)
- The Lost Battalion (1919)
- Lost in Beijing (2007)
- The Lost Bladesman (2011)
- The Lost Boys series:
  - The Lost Boys (1987)
  - Lost Boys: The Thirst (2010)
  - Lost Boys: The Tribe (2008)
- The Lost City: (1950, 1955, 2005 & 2022)
- The Lost City of Z (2016)
- Lost in the Dark: (1914, 1947 & 2007 TV)
- The Lost Daughter (2021)
- Lost and Delirious (2001)
- Lost in Florence (2017)
- Lost and Found: (1979, 1996, 2008 & 2016 American & 2016 Indian)
- Lost Girls (2020)
- Lost Girls & Love Hotels (2020)
- Lost in a Harem (1944)
- Lost Highway (1997)
- The Lost Honour of Katharina Blum (1975)
- Lost Horizon: (1937 & 1973)
- Lost Illusions (2021)
- Lost Indulgence (2008)
- Lost Junction (2003)
- Lost in the Legion (1934)
- The Lost Leonardo (2021)
- A Lost Letter (1953)
- The Lost Letter: (1945 & 1972)
- Lost in London (2017)
- Lost in La Mancha (2002)
- The Lost Moment (1947)
- Lost Patrol (1929)
- The Lost Patrol (1934)
- The Lost Sermon (1914)
- The Lost Skeleton of Cadavra (2001)
- The Lost Son (1999)
- Lost Soul: The Doomed Journey of Richard Stanley's Island of Dr. Moreau (2014)
- Lost Souls: (1998 TV & 2000)
- Lost in Space (1998)
- The Lost Squadron (1932)
- The Lost Tiger (2024)
- Lost in Translation (2003)
- Lost Transmissions (2019)
- The Lost Tribe: (1949, 1985 & 2010)
- The Lost Village (1947)
- The Lost Weekend (1945)
- Lost in White (2016)
- The Lost World: (1925, 1960, 1992, 1998 & 2001 TV)
- The Lost World: Jurassic Park (1997)
- Lost in Wrestling (2015)

==== Lot–Lou ====
- A Lot Like Love (2005)
- Lot No. 249 (2023)
- Lotgenoten (2013)
- Lotna (1979)
- Lots of Luck (1985 TV)
- Lotta flyttar hemifrån (1993)
- Lotta på Bråkmakargatan (1992)
- Lotte (1928)
- Lotte series:
  - Lotte reis lõunamaale (2000)
  - Lotte from Gadgetville (2006)
  - Lotte and the Moonstone Secret (2011)
  - Lotte and the Lost Dragons (2019)
- Lotte in Weimar (1975)
- Lottery: (2009 & 2018)
- The Lottery: (1989 & 2010)
- Lottery Lover (1935)
- Lottery Ticket: (1970 & 2010)
- Lotus Blossom (1921)
- Lotus Code (2015)
- Lotus Eaters (2011)
- Lotus Flowers for Miss Quon (1967)
- Lotus Lady (1930)
- Lotus Lantern (1999)
- Lou: (2010, 2017 & 2022)
- Lou! Journal infime (2014)
- The Loud House Movie (2021)
- Louder Than a Bomb (2010)
- Louder Than Bombs (2015)
- Louder Than Words (2013)
- Loudspeaker: (2009 & 2018)
- The Loudspeaker (1934)
- Louis (2010)
- Louis 19, King of the Airwaves (1994)
- Louis Cyr (2013)
- Louis and Luca – The Big Cheese Race (2015)
- Louis and Luca - Mission to the Moon (2018)
- Louis Zamperini: Captured by Grace (2015)
- Louis' Shoes (2020)
- Louisa (1950)
- Louise: (1939 & 2003)
- Louise Bourgeois: The Spider, the Mistress, and the Tangerine (2008)
- Louise Hires a Contract Killer (2008)
- Louise de Lavallière (1922)
- Louise by the Shore (2016)
- Louisiana: (1919, 1947 & 1984 TV)
- Louisiana Diary (1963 TV)
- Louisiana Hayride (1944)
- Louisiana Purchase (1941)
- Louisiana Story (1948)
- Louisiana Territory (1953)
- Loulou (1980)
- Lounge Chair (1988)
- Lourdes: (2009 & 2019)
- Lousy Little Sixpence (1983)
- Louvre Come Back to Me! (1962)

==== Lov ====
- Love: (1919 American, 1919 German, 1920, 1927 American, 1927 German, 1956, 1971, 1991 Indian, 1991 Soviet, 2004, 2005, 2008 Bengali, 2008 Indonesian, 2011, 2012, 2015, 2020 & 2021)
- Love 'em and Weep (1927)
- Love and a .45 (1994)
- Love Actually (2003)
- Love Affair: (1932, 1939, 1994 & unreleased)
- Love Affairs (1927)
- Love Again (2023)
- Love and Leashes (2022)
- Love in the Afternoon: (1957 & 1972)
- Love Is on the Air (1937)
- Love Is All You Need (2012)
- Love All You Have Left (2017)
- Love Among the Ruins (1975) (TV)
- Love and Anarchy (1973)
- Love & Basketball (2000)
- Love Beats Rhymes (2017)
- Love Between the Raindrops (1979)
- The Love Bug: (1969 & 1997)
- Love Camp 7 (1969)
- Love Clinic (2015)
- Love on the Cloud (2014)
- Love is Colder than Death (1969)
- Love Contractually (2017)
- Love the Coopers (2015)
- Love Crazy: (1941 & 1991)
- Love and Death (1975)
- Love and Death on Long Island (1997)
- Love Is the Devil: Study for a Portrait of Francis Bacon (1998)
- Love on a Diet (2001)
- The Love Doctor (1929)
- Love on the Dole (1941)
- Love Don't Cost a Thing (2003)
- Love and Duty: (1916 & 1931)
- The Love Eterne (1963)
- Love Exposure (2008)
- Love Express: (2016 & 2018)
- Love Field (1992)
- Love Finds Andy Hardy (1938)
- Love, At First... (2015)
- Love at First Bite (1979)
- Love, Gilda (2018)
- The Love Guru (2008)
- Love Happens (2009)
- Love Happy (1949)
- Love Hard (2021)
- Love the Hard Way (2003)
- Love and Honor: (2006 & 2013)
- Love and Human Remains (1993)
- Love Hurts: (1990, 1993, 2009 & 2025)
- The Love of Jeanne Ney (1927)
- Love Jones (1997)
- Love Kills (1998)
- Love and Kisses (1965)
- Love Letter: (1953, 1975, 1985 & 1995)
- The Love Letter: (1923, 1998 TV & 1999)
- Love Letters: (1917, 1924, 1944, 1945, 1984 & 1999 TV)
- Love Lies Bleeding: (1999, 2008, & 2024)
- Love Live! The School Idol Movie (2015)
- Love Liza (2003)
- Love Is Love Is Love (2020)
- Love in Magic (2005)
- Love is a Many-Splendored Thing (1955)
- Love Me If You Dare (2003)
- Love Me or Leave Me (1955)
- Love Me Tender (1956)
- Love Me Tonight (1932)
- Love Meetings (1965)
- Love & Mercy (2014)
- Love and Monsters (2020)
- Love O2O (2016)
- Love Object (2003)
- Love and Other Catastrophes (1996)
- Love & Other Drugs (2010)
- The Love Parade (1929)
- Love & Peace (2015)
- Love Phobia (2006)
- Love Potion No. 9 (1992)
- Love with the Proper Stranger (1963)
- Love on the Run: (1936 & 1979)
- Love Serenade (1996)
- Love & Sex (2000)
- Love Sick (2006)
- Love, Simon (2018)
- Love Slaves of the Amazons (1957)
- A Love Song for Bobby Long (2004)
- Love Stinks (1999)
- Love Stories (1997)
- Love Story: (1925, 1942, 1943, 1944, 1970, 1981, 1986, 2006, 2008, 2011 Indonesian, 2011 New Zealand, 2012, 2013, 2020 & 2021)
- A Love Story: (1933, 2007 & 2016)
- The Love Story of Aliette Brunton (1924)
- The Love Story of Cesare Ubaldi (1922)
- Love Streams (1984)
- Love Studio (2016)
- Love and Suicide: (2005 & 2006)
- The Love Suicides at Sonezaki: (1978 & 1981)
- The Love of Sunya (1927)
- Love and Support (2003)
- Love That Boy (2003)
- Love in Thoughts (2004)
- Love in the Time of Cholera (2007)
- Love Unto Death (1984)
- Love Unto Waste (1986)
- Love! Valour! Compassion! (1997)
- Love, Weddings & Other Disasters (2020)
- The Love Witch (2016)
- Love Without Distance (2015)
- Love's Berries (1926)
- Love's Brother (2004)
- Love's Joys and Woes (1926)
- Love's Labor Lost (1920)
- Love's Labour's Lost (2000)
- Love's Whirlpool: (1924 & 2014)
- Love, Brooklyn (2025)
- Love, Honour and Obey (2000)
- Love, So Divine (2004)
- The Lovebirds (2020)
- The Loved One (1965)
- The Loved Ones (2010)
- Lovelife (1996)
- Lovely & Amazing (2001)
- The Lovely Bones (2009)
- Lovely, Dark, and Deep (2023)
- Lovely Molly (2012)
- Lovely Rivals (2004)
- Lovely, Still (2008)
- The Lover: (1986, 1992, 2002)
- Lover Come Back (1961)
- Lover of the Great Bear (1971)
- Lover's Grief over the Yellow River (1999)
- Loverboy: (1989 & 2005)
- The Lovers: (1946, 1958 & 1994)
- Lovers of the Arctic Circle (1998)
- The Lovers on the Bridge (1999)
- Lovers Lane: (1999 & 2005)
- Lovers and Liars (1979)
- The Lovers of Montparnasse (1958)
- Lovers & Movies (2015)
- Lovers and Other Strangers (1970)
- Lovers Rock (2020)
- Lovers' Concerto (2002)
- Lovers' Lane (1924)
- Lovers' Rock (1964)
- Loves of a Blonde (1965)
- The Loves of Carmen: (1927 & 1948)
- The Loves of Casanova (1927)
- Lovewrecked (2005)
- Lovin' Molly (1974)
- Loving: (1970 & 2016)
- Loving Adults (2022)
- Loving Couples: (1964 & 1980)
- Loving Vincent (2017)
- Loving You: (1957, 2003 TV & 2008)

==== Low–Loy ====
- Low and Behold (2007)
- Low Blow (1986)
- Low Down (2014)
- A Low Down Dirty Shame (1994)
- Low Life: (2004 & 2022)
- The Low Life (1995)
- A Low Life Mythology (2012)
- Low Self-Esteem Girl (2000)
- Low Tide: (2012 & 2019)
- Low-Flying Aircraft (2002)
- Lower City (2006)
- The Lower Depths: (1936 & 1957)
- A Lowland Cinderella (1921)
- Lowlands (1922)
- Lowlife: (2012 & 2017)
- Lowriders (2016)
- The Loyal 47 Ronin (1958)
- Loyal Heart (1946)
- Loyal Lives (1923)
- Loyal Opposition: Terror in the White House (1998 TV)
- The Loyal Rebel (1915)
- Loyalties: (1933, 1986 & 1999)
- Loyalty & Betrayal: The Story of the American Mob (1994 TV)
- Loyalty of Love (1934)
- The Loyola Project (2022)

=== Lu ===
- Lu, the Coquette (1918)
- Lu Gyi Min Khin Byar (2015)
- Lu Over the Wall (2017)

==== Lua–Luc ====
- Luanda, The Music Factory (2009)
- Lubo (2023)
- Luboml: My Heart Remembers (2003)
- Luca: (2019 & 2021)
- Lucania (2019)
- Lucanus Cervus (1910)
- Lucas (1986)
- Lucciola (1917)
- Luchino Visconti (1999)
- Lucia (2013)
- Lucia's Grace (2018)
- Lucid (2005)
- Lucid Dream (2017)
- Lucie (1963)
- Lucie Aubrac (1997)
- Lucifer (2019)
- Lucifer Rising (1972)
- Lucifer's Women (1974)
- Lucifera: Demon Lover (1972)
- Lucile (1927)
- Lucille Love, Girl of Mystery (1914)
- Lucio Flavio (1977)
- Luck: (1931, 2003, 2009 & 2022)
- Luck by Chance (2009)
- The Luck of the Irish: (1920, 1936, 1948 & 2001 TV)
- Luck Key (2016)
- Luck Luck Ki Baat (2012 TV)
- Luck of the Navy (1938)
- The Luck of the Navy (1927)
- Luck in Pawn (1919)
- Luck of the Turf (1936)
- Lucky (2019 TV)
- Lucky Bastard: (2009 & 2013)
- Lucky Break: (1994 & 2001)
- Lucky Day (2019)
- Lucky Grandma (2019)
- Lucky Jordan (1942)
- Lucky Loser (2006)
- Lucky Luciano (1973)
- Lucky Number Slevin (2006)
- Lucky Numbers (2000)
- The Lucky One (2012)
- The Lucky Ones (2008)
- Lucky Star 2015 (2015)
- Lucky Strike (2026)
- The Lucky Texan (1934)
- Lucky Them (2013)
- Lucky Three: an Elliott Smith Portrait (1997)
- Lucky You (2007)
- Lucky: No Time for Love (2005)
- Luckytown (2000)
- Lucy: (2003 TV & 2014)

==== Lud–Lum ====
- Ludo (2020)
- Ludovic: The Snow Gift (1998)
- Ludwig (1973)
- Ludwig II: (1922, 1955 & 2012)
- Ludwig: Requiem for a Virgin King (1972)
- Ludwig van (1969 TV)
- Ludzie bez jutra (1921)
- Luffaren och Rasmus (1955)
- Lugard (2021)
- Luger: (1982 & 2025)
- Luggage of the Gods! (1983)
- Lui è peggio di me (1984)
- Luigi's Ladies (1989)
- Luis and the Aliens (2018)
- Luisa (2016)
- Luisa Sanfelice: (1942 & 2004)
- Luka: (1992 & 2023)
- Lukas (2024)
- Luke of Lies (2015)
- Luke and Lucy: The Texas Rangers (2009)
- Lula, Son of Brazil (2009)
- Lullaby: (1937, 2005, 2010, 2014 & 2022)
- The Lullaby: (1924 & 2017)
- Lullaby of Broadway (1951)
- Lullaby of the Earth (1976)
- Lullaby Land (1933)
- Lullaby to My Father (2012)
- Lullaby for Pi (2010)
- Lulli (2021)
- Lulu: (1914, 1917, 1918, 1953, 1962, 1996 & 2014)
- Lulu Belle (1948)
- Lulu on the Bridge (1998)
- Lulu femme nue (2013)
- Lulu the Movie (2016)
- Lumberjack (1944)
- Lumberjack Man (2015)
- Lumberjack the Monster (2023)
- Luminal (2004)
- Luminous Moss (1992)
- Lumière and Company (1995)
- Lummox (1930)
- Lumo (2007)
- Lump Sugar (2006)
- Lumpaci the Vagabond: (1922 & 1936)
- Lumumba (2000)
- Lumumba, la mort d'un prophète (1990)

==== Lun–Luz ====
- Luna: (1965 & 2017)
- La Luna (1979)
- Luna Caliente (2009)
- Luna di miele in tre (1976)
- Luna e l'altra (1996)
- Luna Papa (1999)
- Luna Park: (1960, 1992 & 2024)
- Lunacy (2005)
- Lunana: A Yak in the Classroom (2019)
- Lunar Eclipse (1999)
- Lunarcy! (2012)
- The Lunatic at Large: (1921 & 1927)
- The Lunatics (1986)
- Lunatics: A Love Story (1991)
- Lunatics and Lovers (1976)
- Lunch with Charles (2001)
- The Lunch Date (1989)
- Lunch Hour (1962)
- Lunch Meat (1987)
- Lunch Wagon (1981)
- Lunch Time Heroes (2015)
- The Lunchbox (2013)
- The Luncheon on the Grass (1979)
- Lunegarde (1946)
- Lungi (2019)
- Lupeni 29 (1962)
- Lupin the Third series:
  - Lupin the 3rd (2014)
  - Lupin the 3rd vs. Detective Conan: The Movie (2013)
  - Lupin III: Dead or Alive (1996)
  - Lupin III: Farewell to Nostradamus (1995)
  - Lupin III: Goemon Ishikawa's Spray of Blood (2017)
  - Lupin III: Jigen's Gravestone (2014)
  - Lupin III: Legend of the Gold of Babylon (1985)
  - Lupin III: Strange Psychokinetic Strategy (2011)
  - Lupin the Third: The Castle of Cagliostro (1979)
- Lupo the Butcher (1987)
- The Lure: (1914, 1933 & 2015)
- Lure of Ambition (1919)
- The Lure of the Circus (1918)
- Lure of the Gold (1922)
- Lure of the Islands (1942)
- Lure of the Night Club (1927)
- Lure of the Swamp (1957)
- Lure of the Wasteland (1939)
- Lure of the West (1926)
- The Lure of the Wild (1925)
- Lure of the Wilderness (1952)
- Lure of the Yukon (1924)
- Lurker (2025)
- Lurking Fear (1994)
- Lurking in Suburbia (2006)
- Lusers (2015)
- Lush (2000)
- Lust (2010)
- Lust Connection (2005)
- Lust in the Dust (1985)
- Lust for Freedom (1987)
- Lust for Gold (1949)
- Lust for Life: (1922 & 1956)
- Lust for Love: (1967 & 2014)
- Lust and Revenge (1996)
- Lust Stories (2018)
- Lust Stories 2 (2023)
- Lust for a Vampire (1971)
- Lust, Caution (2007)
- Luster (2002)
- Lusty Sisters (1972)
- Lutaru Lalna (1938)
- Luther: (1928, 1964 TV, 1973 & 2003)
- Luther: The Fallen Sun (2023)
- Luther the Geek (1989)
- Luther Metke at 94 (1979)
- Luther: Never Too Much (2024)
- Luu Yadanar Treasure (2016)
- Luv (1967)
- LUV (2013)
- Luv Ka The End (2011)
- Luv Ki Arrange Marriage (2024)
- Luv Ni Love Storys (2020)
- Luv Shuv Tey Chicken Khurana (2012)
- Luv Text (2001)
- Luv U Alia (2016)
- Luv U Soniyo (2013)
- Luv You Shankar (2024)
- Lux Æterna (2019)
- Luxembourg, Luxembourg (2022)
- Luxo Jr. (1986)
- Luxor (2020)
- Luxury (1921)
- Luxury Cabin (1959)
- Luxury Car (2006)
- Luxury Hotel (1992)
- Luxury Liner: (1933 & 1948)
- Luz: (2018, 2019, 2020 & 2025)
- Luz del Fuego (1982)
- The Luzhin Defence (2000)
- Luzifer (2021)
- Luzzu (2021)

=== Ly ===
- Lycanthropus (1962)
- Lyckan kommer (1942)
- Lydia (1941)
- The Lyin' Hunter (1937)
- Lying (2006)
- Lying Eyes (1996 TV)
- Lying Lips: (1921 & 1939)
- Lying and Stealing (2019)
- Lying in Wait (2001)
- Lyiza (2011)
- Lykkens musikanter (1962)
- Lyle (2014)
- Lyle, Lyle, Crocodile (2022)
- Lymelife (2009)
- The Lyons Mail: (1916 & 1931)
- The Lyons in Paris (1955)
- The Lyre of Delight (1978)

Previous: List of films: J–K Next: List of films: M

== See also ==
- Lists of films
- Lists of actors
- List of film and television directors
- List of documentary films
- List of film production companies
