= Lumpaci the Vagabond =

Lumpaci the Vagabond may refer to:

- Lumpaci the Vagabond (1922 film), a German silent film
- Lumpaci the Vagabond (1936 film), a German / Austrian film
