= List of films: J–R =

Separate lists have been created for each letter or new group of letters:

- List of films: J-K
- List of films: L
- List of films: M
- List of films: N-O
- List of films: P
- List of films: Q-R
