= Live Animals =

Live Animals may refer to:

- Live Animals (film) a 2008 horror film
- Live Animals (album) the sixth album released by Anti-Nowhere League
- Live Animals (production company), one of the production companies for the American television series Songland
- Live...Animal (EP), an EP by W.A.S.P.
