= Alyse Black =

American singer and songwriter

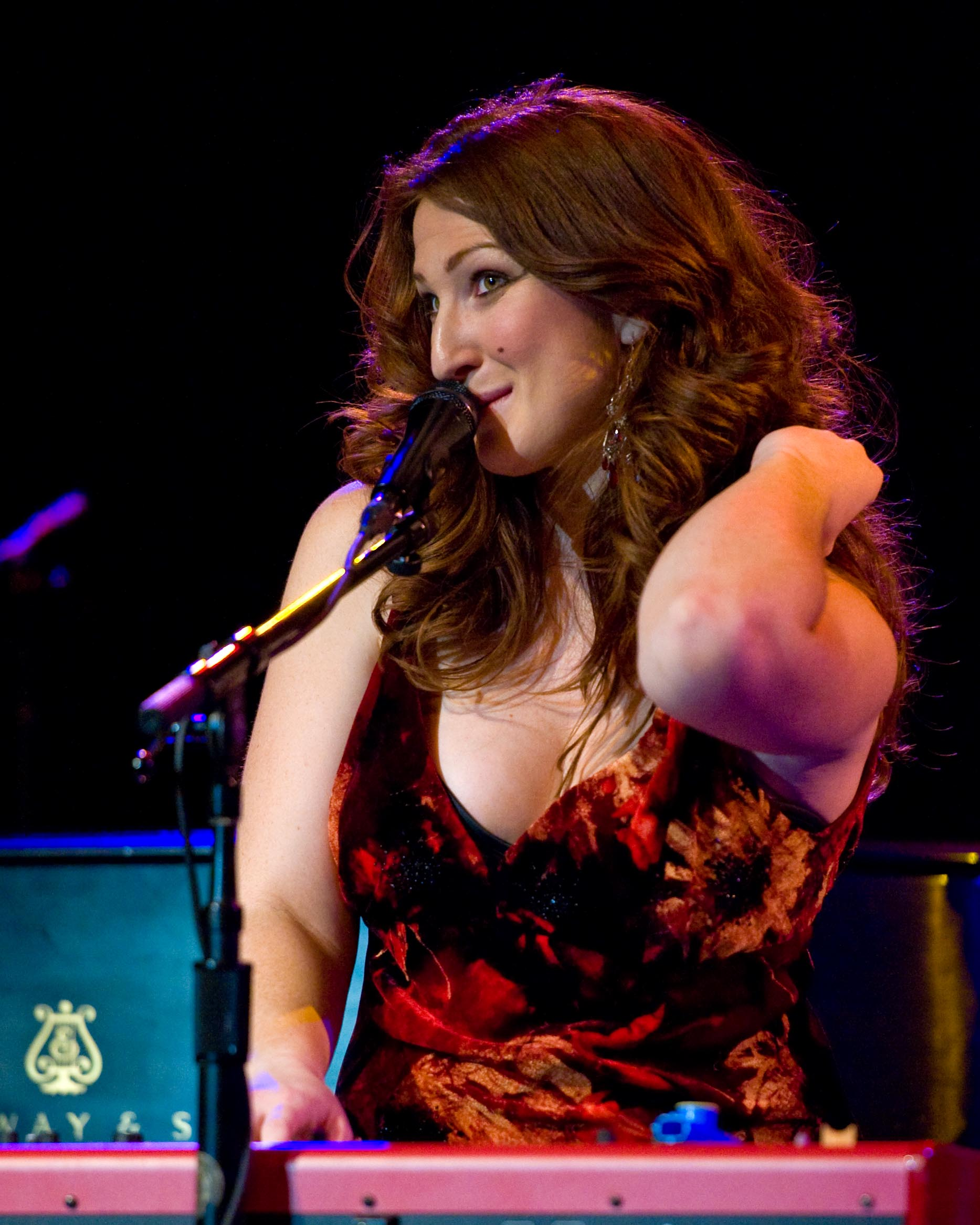
- Alyse Black performing at The Triple Door in Seattle, Washington December 30, 2010

Background information
- Born: Leslie Alyse Robertson
- Origin: Seattle, Washington, United States
- Genres: Rock, indie pop, pop, jazz, folk rock
- Occupations: Musician, Songwriter
- Instruments: Vocals, piano
- Years active: 2007–present
- Website: Alyse Black.com

Alyse Black is an American singer and songwriter. Black's music is described as indie pop with jazz influences, in the vein of artists such as Fiona Apple, Regina Spektor and Norah Jones. Her song "Stood for Stand for", which was featured on Black's debut album Too Much & Too Lovely, won Billboard's 2007 World Song Contest in the Jazz category.

== Background and career ==
Black was born in Seattle, Washington, the youngest of three daughters. According to her website, she initially had an interest in pursuing a career as a singer-songwriter, but instead studied business, communications, and international studies at the University of Washington, where she graduated in 2004.

After working in the corporate world, she returned to her original interest, joining a local jazz band, No Jive Five. Alyse and pianist/band leader, Mike Withey, formed a separate band, Thursty Love, to embrace more Latin/samba influences and romantic themes. Thursty Love recorded an EP in 2008 with classics like "La Vie en Rose," "In the Wee Small Hours," and "Corcovado," as well as an original song Black and Withey had composed together.

Alyse released her debut solo album Too Much & Too Lovely at the end of 2007. Songs from this record garnered Black "Billboard's Annual World Song Contest" in Jazz as well as a few other awards. To tour the record, Alyse joined Austin local band Society Eclaire for a 22 date and festival tour of the country in the old short bus, lovingly dubbed, "Moby."

With a few songwriting awards and tours under her belt, Alyse went back into the studio in early 2009 to record her second full-length record with producer Ryan Hadlock (Brandi Carlile, Ra Ra Riot, The Strokes, Foo Fighters) in Woodinville, Washington. Alyse immediately hit the road to tour the record for the rest of 2009 and first half of 2010. Her song Super Hero was featured on the 2012 film Let's Make a Movie.

In 2010, shortly after having her first daughter, Scarlett, Alyse recorded The Honesty EP with producer/engineer Zach Alkire in Houston, Texas. It released in 2011.

In 2012, Black began working on a new project inspired by motherhood, a collection of original and classic lullabies with the band 'Night Sweet Pea, recorded by engineer/producer, Carla Patullo, in Austin, Texas. To finance the album's production, the band launched a successful campaign on Kickstarter. The album, A Little Line of Kisses, was released to critical acclaim in December 2012. Shortly thereafter, Black's second child, Elliot, was born.

In 2014, she recorded three love song covers with producer Mark Hallman (Carole King, Eliza Gilkyson, Ani Difranco), which was recorded at Congress House Studio in Austin, Texas, and then released in early 2015. The album was titled You Belong To Me after the old pop ballad on the record. The record also contains a cover of Brandi Carlile's "The Story" and Beth Nielsen Chapman's "Seven Shades of Blue."

In early 2015, Alyse began recording her third full-length studio record with producer, Eric Rosse (Sara Bareilles, Tori Amos, Maroon 5, Birdy (singer), Gavin DeGraw, A Fine Frenzy, Landon Pigg, Anna Nalick, Mary Lambert (singer)), in Hollywood. That album was fan-funded on Kickstarter as well, raising $31,276. The self-titled record was released on January 24, 2017. The record has done well with film and TV placement.

During this time, Alyse also garnered an endorsement with Fishman Amps.

Alyse is also a licensed real estate agent with Keller-Williams Realty. She did promise, however, to continue making the world better with her music while raising her three children.

== Influences ==
Black's influences include Nina Simone, Tori Amos, Billie Holiday, Norah Jones, Fiona Apple, Eva Cassidy, Sarah McLachlan, Ani Difranco, Portishead, Björk, Tom Waits, Edith Piaf, Jude, Mazzy Star, Cranberries, Poe, Sarah Vaughan, The Beatles, Led Zeppelin.

== Awards ==
- 1st Place, Jazz, Billboard's Annual World Song Contest, 2007
- 1st Place, Jazz, and Finalist, Adult Contemporary, Independent Singer-Songwriter Awards, 2008

== Discography ==
=== Studio albums ===
- 2007 Too Much & Too Lovely
- 2009 Hold Onto This
- 2011 The Honesty EP
- 2012 A Little Line of Kisses (with band: 'Night, Sweet Pea)
- 2015 You Belong To Me (EP)
- 2017 Alyse Black

=== Live albums ===
- 2011 The Triple Door Sessions LIVE
