= Little Death (disambiguation) =

La petite mort ("The little death") is a metaphor for a sexual orgasm.

Little Death(s) may also refer to:

== Film ==
- A Little Death, a 1995 New Zealand short film
- Little Death, a 1995 short film by François Ozon
- The Little Death (2006 film), an American thriller directed by Morgan Nichols
- The Little Death (2014 film), an Australian comedy directed by Josh Lawson
- Little Deaths (film), a 2011 British horror anthology directed by Sean Hogan, Andrew Parkinson and Simon Rumley
- Little Death (film), a 2024 American comedy-drama directed by Jack Begert
- Little Death, the villain of the in-universe slasher franchise in the 2026 American film Teenage Sex and Death at Camp Miasma by Jane Schoenbrun

== Literature ==
- Little Deaths (anthology), a 1994 book edited by Ellen Datlow

== Music ==
- The Little Deaths, a 1997–2002 American rock band
- Little Death (album), by Pete and the Pirates, 2008
- A Little Death (album), by Claire Rousay, 2025
- The Little Death, an album by Ruth Ruth, 1996
- "Little Death", a song by +44 from When Your Heart Stops Beating, 2006
- "Little Death", a song by Goldfrapp from Wonderful Electric: Live in London, 2004
- "Little Death", a song by Lupe Fiasco from Tetsuo & Youth, 2015
- "A Little Death", a song by Darren Hayes from Homosexual, 2022
- "Little Death", a song by The Beths from Future Me Hates Me, 2018
- "Every Day a Little Death", a song by Stephen Sondheim from the musical A Little Night Music, 1973

== See also ==
- La petite mort (disambiguation)
