= Minnette Lehmann =

American artist (1928–2016)

- Born: Minnette Toby Berns; August 19, 1928; Sacramento, California, U.S.
- Died: June 2026 (aged 97)
- Other names: Minnette Martinson, Malka
- Education: University of California, Berkeley (BA), San Francisco Art Institute (MFA)
- Occupations: Visual artist, editor, educator
- Known for: Photography, painting, collage artist, performance artist
- Movement: Feminist art
- Spouse(s): Robert Martinson (1949–1951; div.); Herbert Lehmann (m. 1954–1997; his death)
- Children: 3, including Michael Lehmann
- Website: www.minnettelehmann.com

Minnette Lehmann (née Minnette Berns; August 19, 1928 – June 2026) was an American visual artist, based in San Francisco, California. She is known for performance art, photography, painting, and collage art. She also worked as an editor and educator.

== Early life and education ==
Minnette Lehmann was born as Minnette Berns on August 19, 1928 in Sacramento, California. Her parents were Polish Jewish refugees and her father had owned a clothing store in Sacramento.

She attended University of California, Berkeley (BA) starting at age 16, during World War II, and studied sociology and pedagogy. She later attended San Francisco Art Institute (MFA, 1972).

== Career ==
In the early 1960s, Minnette Lehmann was the assistant editor for little-known arts and culture review, Contact Magazine, in Sausalito.

After graduating from graduate school in the 1970s, Lehmann taught the history of photography classes at the San Francisco Art Institute, San Francisco State University (SFSU), and University of California Extension.

In 1975, she won a National Endowment for the Arts (NEA) grant for “To Have and To Hold”, a portrait series that scrutinized the institution of marriage. Her NEA grant work, and all other artists NEA work, was acquired by the Smithsonian Institution in 1983. In the late 1970s, Lehmann became involved with the feminist movement in San Francisco, and in the early 1980s began working with other feminist artists. Between 1976 and 1980, Lehmann exhibited a series of nude portraits of men and women called "the Nakeds".

In 1987, with then-student artist Lutz Bacher, Lehmann oversaw and contributed to the publication of Flesh/Theory, which Artforum magazine categorized as a “critical and affective project” that combined “then-recent critical theories, from semiotics to French feminism, with often aggressive vernacular imagery.”

In the 1980s and 1990s, Lehmann exhibited photographs, collages and works of performance art in galleries throughout San Francisco, such as SF Camerawork, Artists' Television Access, Southern Exposure (1991), Media Gallery (1987), and The Lab (1992, 1994, 2000). In 2000, a solo exhibition of Lehmann’s installation art and photography was shown at The Lab in San Francisco. In 2025, Lehmann had an exhibition of her paintings at the gallery in Adobe Books in San Francisco.

== Death and legacy ==
She died at age 97, on June 2026.

Her artwork can be found in museum collections, including at the Smithsonian American Art Museum in Washington, D.C., and the Art Institute of Chicago.

== Personal life ==
In 1948, she married her UC Berkeley classmate Robert Martinson, who was a student leader and chairman of the Berkeley Socialist Youth League. They divorced two years later.

In 1954, she married Dr. Herbert Lehmann in San Francisco. Herbert Lehmann was a Freudian psychoanalyst and German Jewish refugee who had served in the British Army, and was one of the eight individuals enlisted by the British Army to participate in Operation Epsilon. They lived in the Cow Hollow neighborhood of San Francisco, and had three children: actress Barbara Lehmann (1956–1993); filmmaker Michael Lehmann (born 1957); and novelist Stephanie Lehmann (born 1960).

== Exhibitions ==
=== Solo exhibitions ===
- 1987, Minnette Lehmann: Gory Allegories, Media gallery, 369-9th Street, San Francisco, California
- 2000, Amazing: A Solo Exhibition Of New Work By Minnette Lehmann, solo exhibition and retrospective, The Lab, San Francisco, California
- 2025, Malka!, solo exhibition of paintings, Adobe Books, San Francisco, California

=== Group exhibitions ===
- 1983, California Photography: A San Francisco Survey, group exhibition, Centre Eye gallery, Calgary, Alberta, Canada
- 1989, Tableaux Vivants, group exhibition, San Francisco Arts Commission art gallery, San Francisco, California
- 1991, Viscera, group exhibition, Southern Exposure, 401 Alabama Street, San Francisco, California; artist included Lehmann, Elizabeth Borowsky, Shelley Cook, Peter Edlund, Phoebe Gloeckner, Pamela Lanza, Jacqueline Peele, J. John Priola, and Kathryn Weinstein
- 1993, Feminism: What Kind, group performance exhibition, The Women's Building, San Francisco, California
- 2000, Test Tube, group performance exhibition, New Langton Arts, San Francisco, California; artists included Lehmann, Gigi Otálvaro–Hormillosa, and Mads Lynnerup

== Publications ==
- Hayes, Dannielle B., ed. (January 1, 1977). Women Photograph Men. Morrow. ISBN 978-0688032142., contains Lehmann's photos
- Roth, Moira (1988). Roth, Moira; Walrod, Anne; Dickerson, Deborah C.; Maggini, Mary (eds.). Connecting Conversations Interviews with 28 Bay Area Women Artists. Oakland, California: Eucalyptus Press at Mills College., contains an interview with Lehmann (pages 108–109)
