= Lord Byron (disambiguation) =

Lord Byron (1788–1824) was a British poet

Lord Byron may also refer to:

- Lord Byron (umpire) (1872–1955), American Major League Baseball umpire
- Lord Byron (opera), a 1972 opera by Virgil Thomson
- Lord Byron (film), a 2011 Film by Zack Godshall
- Anyone carrying the title Baron Byron
