= Ley Lines (disambiguation) =

Ley lines are accidental straight alignments drawn between various historic structures, prehistoric sites and prominent landmarks believed by pseudoscientists to have spiritual significance.

Ley Lines may also refer to:

- Ley Lines (album), a 2008 album by Embrace the End
- Ley Lines (film), a 1999 Japanese film directed by Takashi Miike
- ley lines, a 2019 album by Flor
- Leylines, a 2019 album by Rising Appalachia
- The Leylines, an English folk rock band

== See also ==
- Ley Line Entertainment, an American film production company
- Ley's Line, a 2002 Japanese film directed by Fukutani Osamu
