= The Lab =

The Lab may refer to:

== Music ==
- The Lab (Australian band), an Australian band from the 1990s
- The Lab (Spanish band), an electronic music duo from Spain

== Venues ==
- The Lab (organization), a non-profit art space in San Francisco, California
- The Lab, Adelaide, home of Immersive Light and Art, venue for music and other performances

== Video games ==
- The Lab (Grand Theft Auto), a fictional radio station from Grand Theft Auto V
- The Lab (video game), a video game featuring a collection of virtual reality experiments set in the Portal video game universe

== Other uses ==
- The Lab (film), a 2013 documentary about the Israeli military industry
- The Lab (novel), a 2006 novel by Jack Heath

== See also ==
- Lab (disambiguation)
