= Michael Lehmann =

American film and television director (born 1957)

- Born: Michael Stephen Lehmann; March 30, 1957 (age 69); San Francisco, California, U.S.
- Education: Columbia University
- Occupations: Film director, television director
- Years active: 1985–present
- Known for: Heathers
- Spouse: Susan McFarlin
- Children: 2, including Zander
- Mother: Minnette Lehmann

Michael Stephen Lehmann (born March 30, 1957) is an American film and television director. He is known for directing the dark comedy film Heathers (1989).

== Early life and education ==
Michael Stephen Lehmann was born on March 30, 1957, in San Francisco, California. His parents are visual artist Minnette Lehmann (née Berns), and Freudian psychoanalyst Herbert Lehmann. Lehmann is of Jewish descent.

In 1978, Lehmann graduated from Columbia University in New York City.

== Career ==
Lehmann's first job in the film industry was answering phones at Francis Ford Coppola's American Zoetrope film company. Later he supervised cameras on films that included 1983's The Outsiders. Lehmann attended film school at the USC School of Cinematic Arts and graduated in 1985. While at USC he made a student film, The Beaver Gets a Boner, the title of which he believes helped get the attention of film executives who would later hire him.

A short film by Lehmann, titled "Ed's Secret Life (An Unauthorized Biography)", was shown on Saturday Night Live. Purportedly about Mister Ed's post-career life, William Schallert, Mick Fleetwood, and Heather Locklear appeared in it.

Lehmann is most known for directing the dark comedy Heathers. He also directed 40 Days and 40 Nights, The Truth About Cats & Dogs, Hudson Hawk, Meet the Applegates, Airheads and Because I Said So.

Lehmann directed his first television commercial through the Leo Burnett Company in June 1996 for McDonald's. Lehmann also directs for television, and has worked on The Comeback and The West Wing. Lehmann directed episodes of The Larry Sanders Show, Watching Ellie, Century City, Big Love, True Blood, Californication, Wonderfalls, White Famous, Betas, American Horror Story, Snowfall, Veronica Mars, and 68 Whiskey.

Lehmann said that he never would make a sequel to Heathers and that Winona Ryder wanted to do Heathers set in Washington, D.C., but he saw no potential for the project.

== Filmography ==
Film

- Heathers (1989)
- Meet the Applegates (1990) (Also writer)
- Hudson Hawk (1991)
- Airheads (1994)
- The Truth About Cats & Dogs (1996)
- My Giant (1998)
- 40 Days and 40 Nights (2002)
- Because I Said So (2007)
- Flakes (2007)

Television

Year	Title	Director	Executive Producer	Notes
1993	Homicide: Life on the Street	Yes	No	Episode "Night of the Dead Living"
1994–1997	The Larry Sanders Show	Yes	No	5 episodes
1995	Fallen Angels	Yes	No	Episode: "Good Housekeeping"
1999	The West Wing	Yes	No	Episode: "Five Votes Down"
2002	Watching Ellie	Yes	No	Episode: "Aftershocks"
2002	Pasadena	Yes	No	Episode: "Run Lily Run"
2003	Trash	Yes	No	TV movie
2004	Century City	Yes	Co-executive	2 episodes: "Pilot" and "The Face Was Familiar"
2004	Wonderfalls	Yes	No	Episode: "Caged Bird"
2005	The Comeback	Yes	No	4 episodes
2006–2009	Big Love	Yes	No	3 episodes: "The Baptism", "Good Guys and Bad Guys" and "Outer Darkness"
2007	Family of the Year	Yes	No	Episode: "Pilot"
2008	Miss Guided	Yes	No	2 episodes: "Rebel Yell" and "Pool Party"
2008	12 Miles of Bad Road	Yes	No	Episode: "Moon-shadow"
2008–2009	Worst Week	Yes	No	2 episodes: "The Wedding" and "The Sex"
2008–2013	True Blood	Yes	No	15 episodes
2008–2014	Californication	Yes	No	7 episodes
2009	The Beautiful Life	Yes	No	Episode: "The Beautiful Aftermath"
2009–2010	Bored to Death	Yes	No	7 episodes
2010	Outsourced	Yes	No	Episode: "Bolloween"
2010	The Big C	Yes	No	2 episodes: "Divine Intervention" and "New Beginnings"
2011	Nurse Jackie	Yes	No	2 episodes: "Play Me" and "Mitten"
2011–2012	Dexter	Yes	No	2 episodes: "Ricochet Rabbit" and "The Dark… Whatever"
2011–2013	American Horror Story	Yes	No	3 episodes: "Smoldering Children", "Unholy Night" and "The Name Game"
2012	Cassandra French's; Finishing School for Boys	Yes	No	Episode: "Pilot"
2013	Go On	Yes	No	2 episodes: "Win at All Costas" and "Double Down"
2013	Betas	Yes	Yes	4 episodes
2014–2016	Tyrant	Yes	Yes	4 episodes
2015	House of Lies	Yes	No	Episode: "Praise Money! Hallowed be Thy Name"
2015	The Brink	Yes	No	4 episodes
2015	Scream Queens	Yes	No	Episode: "Thanksgiving"
2015–2016	Blunt Talk	Yes	No	6 episodes
2016	Chance	Yes	Yes	3 episodes: "Hiring It Done", "Unlocking Your Hidden Powers" and "Fluid Management"
2017	White Famous	Yes	No	2 episodes: "Wolves" and "Make Believe"
2017–2019	Snowfall	Yes	No	3 episodes: "A Long Time Coming", "The Offer" and "The Bottoms"
2018	Deception	Yes	Yes	3 episodes: "Forced Perspective", "Getting Away Clean" and "Transposition"
2019	Jessica Jones	Yes	No	Episode: "A.K.A. The Perfect Burger"
2019	Veronica Mars	Yes	Yes	Episode: "Spring Break Forever"
2019	The Terror	Yes	No	2 episodes: "Gaman" and "The Weak Are Meat"
2020	68 Whiskey	Yes	Yes	5 episodes
2022	The Woman in the House Across the Street from the Girl in the Window	Yes	Yes	Miniseries
2023	Heels	Yes	No	2 episodes: "Discord" and "Heavy Heads"
2024	American Rust	Yes	No	2 episodes: "Iron Sky" and "The Hand You're Delt"
2024	Will Trent	Yes	No	Episode: "Have You Never Been to a Wedding?"
2024–2025	Dexter: Original Sin	Yes	Yes	6 episodes
2026	R.J. Decker	Yes	No	3 episodes: "Brenner's Back", "Arms and Armadillos" and "Before You Accuse Me"
