= La petite mort (disambiguation) =

La petite mort (French for "the little death") is a metaphor for orgasm.

La petite mort may also refer to:

- La petite mort, a 1995 short film by François Ozon
- Petite Mort (ballet), a 1991 ballet by Jiří Kylián
- "Petite Mort", 2004 song by the Canadian band Stars
- "La Petite Mort", a song by Violet Chachki from her 2015 EP Gagged
- La petite mort, short film by Jason Merrells
- La Petite Mort (James album), a 2014 album
- La Petite Mort or a Conversation with God, a 2016 album by King 810

== See also ==
- Little Death (disambiguation)
