= Robert Martinson =

American sociologist (1927–1979)

- Freedom Rider mugshot from 1961
- Born: May 19, 1927; Minneapolis, Minnesota, US
- Died: August 11, 1979 (aged 52); Manhattan, New York City, US
- Education: University of California, Berkeley. B.A., M.A., Ph.D.
- Occupation: Criminologist
- Known for: "Nothing works" doctrine regarding prisoner rehabilitation
- Spouse(s): Minnette Berns (m. 1948–1951; div.), Rita J. Carter (m. 1961)

Robert Magnus Martinson (May 19, 1927 – August 11, 1979) was an American sociologist, whose 1974 study "What Works?", concerning the shortcomings of existing prisoner rehabilitation programs, was highly influential, creating what became known as the "nothing works" doctrine. His later studies were more optimistic, but less influential at the time. He served as chairman of the Sociology Department at the City College of New York, and then founded the Center for Knowledge in Criminal Justice Planning.

== Life and career ==
Martinson was born on May 19, 1927, in Minneapolis, Minnesota to Magnus Constantine Martinson and Gwendolyn A. Gagnon. He received his degrees – BA (1949), MA (1953), PhD (1968) – from the University of California, Berkeley.

In 1948, he married his UC Berkeley classmate, artist Minnette Berns (later known as Minnette Lehmann). They divorced two years later.

In 1959 he ran for mayor of Berkeley, California as the Socialist Party candidate.

Martinson was a participant in the 1961 Freedom Riders, spending over a month in two Mississippi jails, and wrote about his experience for The Nation. He also wrote a longer academic study of the group dynamics within his cohort of imprisoned Freedom Riders. His incarceration generated his interest in penology.

He married Rita J. Carter on September 18, 1961, in San Francisco, California.

Martinson's investigation with Douglas Lipton and Judith Wilks regarding the rehabilitation of inmates in prison had been commissioned in 1966 by the New York State Governor's Commission on Criminal Offenders. It covered 231 earlier studies, dating from 1945 to 1967. Their first draft had been completed in 1970, but because the results were considered unsuitable, the report was initially suppressed. It later became available after an unrelated court case.

Something of a public figure at the time, Martinson was interviewed by People magazine and on 60 Minutes (August 24, 1975), asserting that "nothing works" in prison rehabilitation. His work was embraced by politicians, and inspired a wave of strong sentencing and cancellation of rehabilitation programs. Academics, however, strongly criticized his studies, concluding mostly untrained practitioners in underfunded programs, and he later reversed his stance.

Martinson committed suicide on August 11, 1979, by leaping from his fifteenth floor Manhattan apartment.

== Works ==
- Martinson, Robert Magnus (1968). Treatment Ideology and Correctional Bureaucracy: A Study of Organizational Change (Thesis). University of California, Berkeley.
- Martinson, Robert (Spring 1974). "What works?—questions and answers about prison reform". The Public Interest: 22–54.
- Lipton, Douglas; Martinson, Robert; Wilks, Judith (1975). The Effectiveness of Correctional Treatment: A Survey of Treatment Evaluation Studies. New York: Praeger.
- Martinson, Robert (Winter 1979). "New Findings, New Views: A Note of Caution Regarding Sentencing Reform". Hofstra Law Review. 7 (2).
