= Suicide Manual =

2003 film by Osamu Fukutani

- Directed by: Osamu Fukutani
- Release date: 2003

Suicide Manual (自殺マニュアル, Jisatsu Manyuaru) is a 2003 film directed by Osamu Fukutani.

== Plot ==
The movie follows Yū (played by Kenji Mizuhashi), a cameraman who works for a small TV station. He and his assistant Rie (Chisato Morishita) are sent by their superior, Keita (Hideo Sakaki), to investigate a case of group suicide in which four people poisoned themselves with carbon monoxide.

When they enter the apartment they accidentally run into a teenage girl, Nanami Kumatani (played by Ayaka Maede) who was in the pact but backed out at the last minute out of fear. The girl tells them about 'Ricki' (played by Yûko Nakamura) and agrees to show them her suicide manual in exchange for letting her look on the roof of their office. Yū and Rie agree and they take her there. They become possessed by evil spirits and die by suicide as a result of this encounter.

== Sequel ==
In the sequel The Suicide Manual: Intermediate Level (2003) the 'Suicide Manual' DVD produced by Yu and Rie about the case causes more people to die by suicide. A forensic investigation is held after a forensics lab tech fails to stop his girlfriend killing herself. The end of the film reveals the 'evil spirit' causing these events to have been the producer of the 'Suicide Manual' DVD.

== See also ==
- The Complete Manual of Suicide by Wataru Tsurumi
