= Lab =

Lab most often refers to:

- Laboratory, a facility to conduct scientific research and experiments

Lab or LAB may also refer to:

== Places ==
- Láb, a village near Br in western Slovakia
- Lab, a school in Chicago
- Labrador, the mainland part of the province "Newfoundland and Labrador" in Canada

== Music ==
- LAB Records, a British independent record label
- LAB (band), a Finnish band
- L.A.B., a New Zealand reggae band

== Transportation ==
- Laburnum railway station, Melbourne
- League of American Bicyclists
- Linhas Aéreas Brasileiras, a defunct Brazilian airline
- Lloyd Aéreo Boliviano, a defunct Bolivian airline

== Science and technology ==
- Linear alkylbenzene
- Lithosphere-Asthenosphere boundary, between layers of the Earth
- Lactic acid bacteria
- Lab color space
- Lyman-alpha blob, in interstellar space
- Linear alkylbenzene sulfonate

== Groups ==
- Langile Abertzaleen Batzordeak, a Basque trade union
- Lockerz advisory board
- Los Angeles Baptist High School, US

== Other ==
- Labrador Retriever, a dog breed
- Legs, abs, and butt fitness workout
- LAB HD, a defunct American television channel

== See also ==
- Labs (disambiguation)
- Labour Party (disambiguation)
- The Lab (disambiguation)
