= Labs =

Labs, labs, or LABS may carry the following meanings:

- labs, a C mathematical function for absolute value
- Labs (people) (Lab Albanians), the inhabitants of the Labëria region in Albania
- Helga Labs (born 1940), East German politician
- Low Altitude Bombing System, US
- Linear alkyl benzene sulfonate, a salt of a linear alkylbenzenesulfonic acid, used as an anionic surfactant: for example, sodium dodecylbenzenesulfonate

== See also ==
- Lab (disambiguation)
