= Osamu Fukutani =

Japanese film director (born 1967)

Osamu Fukutani (福谷 修 Fukutani Osamu, born August 2, 1967, in Nagoya) is a Japanese film director.

== Selected filmography ==
- Ley's Line (2002)
- Suicide Manual (2003)
