= Esfir Shub =

Soviet film maker (1894–1959)

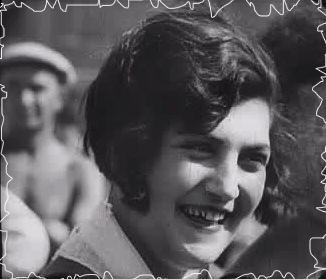
Esfir Shub appears in Dziga Vertov's Man With A Movie Camera

Esfir Ilyinichna Shub (Russian: Эсфи́рь Ильи́нична Шуб; 16 March 1894, Surazh, Russian Empire – 21 September 1959, Moscow, Soviet Union), also referred to as Esther Il'inichna Shub, was a pioneering Soviet filmmaker and editor in both the mainstream and documentary fields. She is best known for her trilogy of films, Fall of the Romanov Dynasty (1927), The Great Road (1927), and The Russia of Nicholas II and Leo Tolstoy (1928). Shub is credited as the creator of compilation film, and is known for her revolutionary approaches to editing and assembling preserved and archived footage.

== Early life and education ==
Shub was born on March 16, 1894, into a Jewish family of landowners in the town of Surazh, in Chernigov Governorate of the Russian Empire. Shub was born into a lower middle class family. Her father, Ilya Roshal, was a pharmacist. Shub's mother died when she was a young child and was also known to have one brother. She travelled to Moscow before the Russian Revolution.

By the mid-1910s, Shub had settled in Moscow to begin her study of literature at the Higher Courses for Women. There she got involved in the revolutionary fervor emerging amongst young university students.

== Career ==
After moving to Moscow, Shub became involved in the Soviet avant-garde world, specifically in constructivist theatre. Shub edited a wide range of films. Noted is her first work, a complete re-editing of Charlie Chaplin's 1916 film Carmen, which was the first Chaplin film ever to be seen in the Soviet Union. In 1918, after working as Vsevolod Meyerhold’s private secretary in the Soviet administration at the head office of the TEO Theatre Department of the Narkompros (People’s Commissariat of Education), she began collaborating with the stage director Vsevolod Meyerhold and poet Vladimir Mayakovsky on several theatrical projects. During this time she also became involved with the Left Front of the Arts (LEF) group.

=== Goskino ===
In 1922, Shub began her film career at Goskino, the major Soviet state-owned film company. There she worked as an editor, in charge of censoring imported foreign films for domestic distribution, rendering these films “suitable” for Soviet audiences. Here she worked alongside Sergei Eisenstein, re-editing films such as the Soviet release of Fritz Lang’s Dr Mabuse.

Shub’s intensive experience at Goskino, reediting pre-revolutionary and foreign productions as well as new Soviet features, helped cultivate the journalistic style of filmmaking she is well-regarded for. Her method of editing had a substantial influence on both Dziga Vertov and Eisenstein, two of her most prominent peers.

=== The Fall of the Romanov Dynasty (1927) ===
In 1927, Shub released her first documentary, Padenie dinastii Romanovykh. She was commissioned to commemorate the tenth anniversary of the October Revolution. and to provide the first visual record of the Russian Revolution. The Fall of the Romanov Dynasty is one of Shub’s most famous surviving films and what many film historians classify as the first compilation film or Soviet montage. Originally titled February, screenwriter Mark Tseitlin and Esfir Shub collaborated on this documentary-style film centered around the decline of the Russian monarchy.

The movie is made up of stock and archived footage that Shub meticulously preserved and reused. Shub traveled to Leningrad in 1926 to obtain the footage she needed for the film, spending two months examining more than 60,000 meters of film (much of which was damaged) and chose 5,200 meters to take back to Moscow. The film covers the years 1912 to 1917, recounting the moments before, after and during World War I, and then ending with the October Revolution. It is notable for its use of intertitles, which provide historical context and commentary on the events depicted in the footage as well as help guide viewers through the beginning of the end of the Romanov dynasty. This technique, along with her portrayal of the Romanov family, effectively demonstrates the stark contrast between the lavish lifestyle of the aristocracy and the struggles of the working class. Film theorist Alla Gadassik suggests that without her intervention in "sourcing, untangling and preserving neglected rolls of film, it is highly likely that none of this footage would survive the following decades." Shub’s contribution to the history of compilation film was influential in the United States in the 1930s and during World War II. Historians Jack C. Ellis and Betsy A. McLane note that, “nothing like Shub’s films had existed before them, and her work remains among the finest examples of the compilation technique."

=== Critical reception ===
Eisenstein's October(1928), which was also commissioned for the tenth anniversary of the event, was criticized by LEFists (Soviet art journalists), for being 'too personal,' while deeming the impersonality of Shub's work more exemplary for the Revolution. Soviet film theorists praised Shub’s invisible authority as truly revolutionary, for it was consumed effectively as propaganda. Sergei Emolinsky, a constructivist critic associated with Soviet art journal, LEF, praises both Shub and Vertov equally for their different attitudes towards documentary film. He explains that while, “Vertov ‘threw himself on the given material, cutting it into numerous pieces, thus subordinating it to his imagination...Shub regarded each piece [shot] as to a self-sufficient, autonomous entity’.” This first-hand critique of the two methods indicate that Shub’s dedication to journalistic cinematography was the catalyst for what documentary film classifies today, compilation film.

=== Later works ===
In 1927 Shub published the article "Rabota Montazhnits" or "The Work of Montagesses," which outlined the labour of women in editing. This article was published months following the distribution of the Fall of the Romanov Dynasty (1927) documentary, which is when Shub was struggling to gain recognition and directional credit for her film.

In 1932, Shub helped spearhead the first Soviet documentary to have sound, called Sponsor of Electrification.

In the late 1940s and early 1950s, she worked predominantly as an editor and spent time writing her memoirs both about her life and about filmmaking techniques. She also wrote a script titled Women (1933–34), which examined women's roles throughout history. Although this project was never filmed, the script reveals Shub's interest in feminism.

== Personal life ==
Shub was married twice. She had a daughter, Anna, with her first husband, Isaac Vladimirovich Shub. After this marriage ended in divorce, she married Aleksei Gan, a filmmaker who also published the film journal Kino-Fot. Shub died on September 21, 1959, in Moscow.

=== Memoirs ===
Esfir Shub took the time to write her own memoirs entitled, Zhizn Moya — Kinematograf (My Life — Cinema) in the latter half of her career. More information about these memoirs can be found in Vlada Petric’s article in the Quarterly Review of Film Studies no. 4, “Esther Shub: Cinema is My Life” which is available for viewing at the New York Public Library. In her memoirs, she describes numerous films that were either never made or that the government handed to lesser-known filmmakers who were favored at the time. In her recollections, she is forthcoming about her struggle to win respect as a female theorist and practitioner in the male dominated field of Soviet cinema.

== Filmography ==
- The Fall of the Romanov Dynasty (1927)
- Prostitute (1927) - editor
- The Great Road (1927)
- The Russia of Nicholas II and Lev Tolstoi (1928)
- Today (1930)
- Komsomol – Leader of Electrification (1932)
- Spain (1939)
- The Native Country (1942)
- On the Other Side of the Araks (1946)

== See also ==
- Documentary film
- Found footage
- Soviet montage
