= Low Life (2022 film) =

American film

- Directed by: Tyler Michael James
- Distributed by: XYZ Films
- Release date: August 25, 2022
- Running time: 105 minutes
- Country: United States
- Language: English

Low Life is a 2022 American crime drama thriller film directed by Tyler Michael James.

== Reception ==
Morgan Keller of SLUG called Low Life "too heavy for a horror movie and too cheesy to be a drama". Film Threat reviewer Alan Ng said the film was "a non-stop rollercoaster that will leave you frazzled long after it's over, just before getting back on the ride".
