= Lodz Ghetto (1988 film) =

1988 holocaust documentary film

Lodz Ghetto is a 1988 documentary film directed by Kathryn Taverna and Alan Adelson about the segregation of the Jewish population at Łódź Ghetto during WWII.

== Summary ==
The film reflects the experiences of 2,000 Jews who were forced into labor under the leadership of Mordechai Chaim Rumkowski (voiced by novelist Jerzy Kosinski in the film) utilizing journals written by those who lived and died at the ghetto (narrated by actors David Warrilow and Theodore Bikel) alongside photographs and archival footage.

== Production ==
The film took four years to complete on a $75,000 budget with donations from the National Endowment for the Humanities, Corporation for Public Broadcasting, head of Atari Jack Tramiel who survived said ghetto and President of Interscope Communications Frederick Field.

New York City mayor Ed Koch tried to obtained permission for a five-day shoot at Poland, but the government was reluctant due to concerns over the depiction of the country's anti-Semetism in Claude Lanzmann's acclaimed 1985 documentary Shoah.

== Accolades ==
The film was nominated for the Documentary Grand Jury Prize at the 1989 Sundance Film Festival and was shortlisted for the Academy Award for Best Documentary Feature that same year.

== Home media ==
The film was released on VHS by PBS Home Video on March 23, 1994, and DVD by Jewish Heritage on April 25, 2003.

== See also ==
The following Oscar-winning documentaries similar in content:

- Black Fox: The Rise and Fall of Adolf Hitler (1962)
- Genocide (1981)
- Hotel Terminus: The Life and Times of Klaus Barbie (1988)
