= Lend Me Your Voice =

2022 Rwandan film

- Directed by: Claudine Ndimbira
- Production company: Generation Africa
- Release date: 2021: 7 May 2022 (DOK.fest Munich)
- Running time: 19 minutes
- Countries: Rwanda; South Africa
- Languages: Kinyarwanda; Kirundi; French; English

Lend Me Your Voice is a 2021 Rwandan documentary short film directed by Claudine Ndimbira. The film was screened as a world premiere on 7 May 2022 in the African Encounters category at the Internationales Dokumentarfilmfestival München (DOK.fest München) and was just one of two films from Generation Africa project to be premiered at the 2022 DOK.fest Munich with the other being Home Again. The film was also screened at the Sheffield DocFest in June 2022. The film was also aired on Arte.

== Synopsis ==
Akili Nadege, Congolese woman lived as a refugee in Burundi as she never had the opportunity of growing up in her native Democratic Republic of the Congo due to the cruel civil war which even took away the life of her own father. She realises her family has been displaced and separated and she herself has been at the receiving end as she was held and tortured in prison during her time as refugee in Burundi and even falls at risk of death. She somehow escapes from Burundi and moves to Rwanda in search of glimmer of hope. She gives a spirited fightback against the misogyny and rises up to the occasion.

== Production ==
The film was produced by Generation Africa in collaboration with Deutsche Welle Akademie, Robert Bosch Stiftung, Social Transformation and Empowerment Projects (STEPS), Bertha Foundation, German Federal Ministry for Economic Cooperation and Development and German Cooperation. The film was one of the 25 films which was selected for the Generation Africa project.
