= Last House Standing =

- Directed by: Chao Gan; Zi Liang
- Starring: Mr. Jiang; Zi Liang
- Release date: 13 October 2004 (Cork Film Festival)
- Running time: 54 minutes
- Country: China
- Language: Mandarin

Last House Standing (Fang dong jiang xian sheng) is a documentary filmed in Shanghai featuring interviews of "Uncle Jiang" about his reluctance to sell his 1930s mansion in a district zoned for demolition.

Jiang talks about his family, his loneliness, the Cultural Revolution, and the relationship formed with his interviewer, reporter Zi "Miss Tomboy" Liang.
