= Lunch Meat (film) =

- Directed by: Kirk Alex
- Written by: Kirk Alex (writer)
- Produced by: Kirk Alex (producer); Mark Flynn (producer); Al Goodrum (associate producer); Robert Oland (associate producer); Pamela Phillips Oland (executive producer)
- Starring: See below
- Cinematography: Al Goodrum
- Edited by: H.E. Chambers
- Music by: Rick Neigher
- Distributed by: Tapeworm Video
- Release date: 1987
- Running time: 88 minutes
- Country: United States
- Language: English
- Budget: <$60,000

Lunch Meat is a 1987 American film directed by Kirk Alex.

The film is also known as Lunchmeat (American video title).

== Plot summary ==
Six high school seniors embark on a camping trip but are suddenly ambushed by murderous hillbillies who sell the remains of their victims to a local fast food restaurant.

== Cast ==
- Kim McKamy as Roxy
- Chuck Ellis as Benny
- Joe Ricciardella as Frank
- Elroy Wiese as Paw
- Robert Oland as Harley
- Mitch Rogers as Elwood
- Rick Lorentz as Cary
- Bob Joseph as Eddie
- Marie Ruzicka as Debbie
- Patricia Christie as Sue
- Ann McBride as Waitress

== Production ==
After working as a cab driver, Kirk Alex sold his cab to raise money to shoot Lunch Meat. In addition to directing, Alex also wrote the script, provided all of the film's funding. As obtaining filming permits would've necessitated the presence of a fire marshal and police officer at a cost of $40 per hour, Kirk and his crew shot the film "outlaw style" filming in locations without permits until law enforcement showed up and forced them to leave with the crew all feigning ignorance they were breaking the rules.

== Reception ==
Todd Martin of HorrorNews.net reviewed Lunch Meat, stating that the death scenes and the effects were good for the film's limited budget but that overall the film did not deliver anything new or groundbreaking with the film's premise. Michael Weldon covered the film in his book The Psychotronic Video Guide, noting that the film was "not really very gory for an 80s horror movie but is somehow disturbing and effective despite continuity problems and a weak ending."

Approximately 2,500 VHS copies of the film were sold with both the producers and distributor Tapeworm Video deeming the release a success.
