= Lev Tolstoy and the Russia of Nicholas II =

1928 film

- Directed by: Esfir Shub
- Written by: Esfir Shub
- Production company: Sovkino
- Release date: 1928
- Country: Soviet Union
- Languages: Silent; Russian intertitles

Lev Tolstoy and the Russia of Nicholas II (Russian: Россия Николая Второго и Лев Толстой, romanized: Rossiya Nikolaya II i Lev Tolstoy) is a 1928 Soviet silent documentary film directed by Esfir Shub. The film is considered lost.

== See also ==
- Leo Tolstoy
- Nicholas II of Russia

== Bibliography ==
- Christie, Ian & Taylor, Richard. The Film Factory: Russian and Soviet Cinema in Documents 1896-1939. Routledge, 2012.
