= Lettre à la prison =

Lettre à la prison (Letter to Jail)
- Directed by: Marc Scialom
- Screenplay by: Marc Scialom
- Produced by: Film Flamme Le Sacre Polygone étoilé
- Starring: Tahar Aïbi Marie-Christine Lefort Myriam Tuil
- Cinematography: Marc Scialom
- Edited by: Marc Scialom
- Music by: Matar Mohamed
- Release date: 1969
- Running time: 70 minutes
- Country: France

Lettre à la prison is a 1969 French film directed by Marc Scialcom. It was left in a box until 2005, when Scialcom's daughter found it and had it restored.

== Synopsis ==
In 1970, Tahar, a young Tunisian, travels to France for the first time to help his older brother, who is wrongly accused of murder and incarcerated in Paris. He first stops in Marseille, where he meets Tunisians very different from those familiar to him; enigmatic French people; and a strange atmosphere that makes him doubt his brother's innocence, his own innocence and his own mental integrity.

== Awards ==
- Festival Internacional de Documentales de Marsella, 2008
- Premio Anno Uno Festival del cinema e delle Arti I Milleocchi, Trieste (Italy), 2012
