= Land Matters =

Land Matters is a 2009 documentary film directed by Thorsten Schütte that examines the impact of land reform in Namibia on the farmer communities. The film features interviews with farmers and farm workers from different regions and backgrounds, as well as experts and activists on the land issue. The film explores the historical, political, economic, and social aspects of land reform, as well as the challenges and opportunities it presents for the future of Namibia.

== Background ==
The film was produced by Schütte's company, Nomad Films, in collaboration with the Namibian Broadcasting Corporation and the Namibian Film Commission. It was funded by the German Federal Ministry for Economic Cooperation and Development and the Goethe-Institut. The film was shot in various locations across Namibia, including Windhoek, Otjiwarongo, Grootfontein, Tsumeb, Oshakati, and Keetmanshoop. The film offers subtitles in English, German, and French, and a voice-over in Afrikaans.

The film was released in Namibia in September 2009, and was screened at several film festivals and events, such as the Africa in Motion Film Festival in Edinburgh, the Afrika Filmfestival in Leuven, the International Documentary Film Festival Amsterdam, and the Berlinale Forum. The film received positive reviews from critics and audiences, who praised its balanced and nuanced approach to the land issue, as well as its cinematic quality and aesthetic. The film was also followed by a report that documented the reactions and comments of the viewers who watched the film in different parts of Namibia.
