= Lanfranchi's Memorial Discotheque =

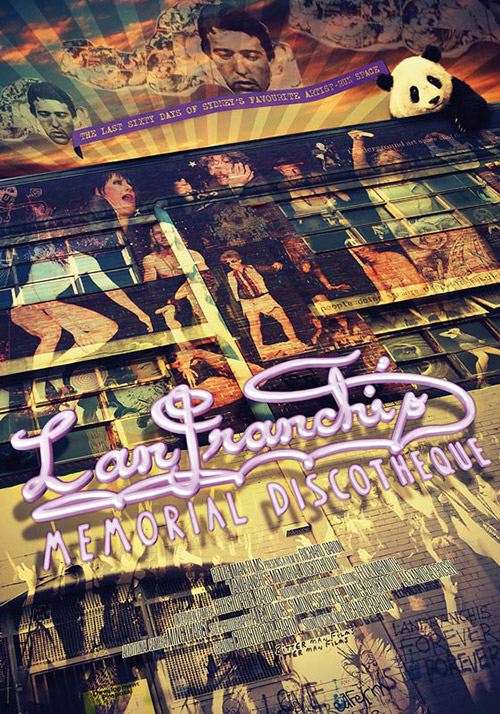
Lanfranchi's Memorial Discotheque The last sixty days of Sydney's favourite artist-run space
- Directed by: Richard Baron
- Produced by: Richard Baron
- Production company: Carrier Signals
- Release date: 2010
- Country: Australia
- Language: English

Lanfranchi's Memorial Discotheque is a 2010 documentary and the first feature film directed and produced by Richard Baron. The film chronicles the last sixty days of the eponymous artist-run initiative which ran from 2002 to 2007 in Sydney, Australia.

The film premiered at a sold out Popcorn Taxi event (compared by Jaimie Leonarder aka Jay Katz), was nominated for an Independent Spirit award at Inside Film Awards, won the Director's Choice Award at Sydney Underground Film Festival and Best Documentary at Melbourne Underground Film Festival.

One year after its premiere screening, the film was digitally distributed as a free, legal BitTorrent download via VODO.

The film was released by Baron's production company Bitter Man Films which subsequently re-branded as Carrier Signals.
