= The Lab (film) =

- Directed by: Yotam Feldman
- Release date: 2013
- Running time: 60 minutes
- Language: Hebrew

The Lab is a 2013 documentary film directed by Yotam Feldman about the Israeli military industry. At the 2013 Tel Aviv International Documentary Film Festival it won the award for best debut film. It was also shown at the German documentary film festival DOK Leipzig, the Antenna Film Festival in Sydney, and the Visions du Réel festival in Nyon, Switzerland. It is an Israeli, Belgian, French coproduction of Gum films. It is 60 minutes long and is in Hebrew with English subtitles. It shows how Israel's military industry benefits economically from the experience and technology developed through years of conflict and military operations, and claims that Israel makes a profit by testing weapons in the field and then selling them worldwide with the marketing that they were tested in combat.
