= Ley's Line =

- Directed by: Osamu Fukutani
- Written by: Osamu Fukutani
- Produced by: Kazunari Shibata
- Starring: Umeka Kaneko, Fuyuhiko Nishi, Yui Sobue, Kengo Takafuji
- Cinematography: Shin Hayasaka
- Edited by: Osamu Fukutani
- Music by: Saku Sakamoto
- Release date: 2002
- Running time: 68 min.
- Country: Japan
- Language: Japanese

Ley's Line (レイズライン, Reizu Rain) is a 2002 Japanese film directed by Osamu Fukutani.
