= Live Animals (film) =

- Directed by: Jeremy Benson
- Written by: Mark Williams; Jeremy Benson
- Produced by: Jeremy Benson; Jeanette Comans; Mark Williams
- Starring: John Still; Christian Walker; Jeanette Comans
- Cinematography: Ryan Parker
- Edited by: Kurt Manchester Jr.
- Music by: Brock Manchester
- Release date: October 26, 2008 (Hollywood Film Festival)
- Running time: 84 minutes
- Country: United States
- Language: English

Live Animals is a 2008 American horror film starring John Still, Christian Walker, and Jeanette Comans and co-written, produced and directed by Jeremy Benson.

== Plot ==
College students Nick, his younger sister Erin and their engaged friends Vicky and Josh attend a beach party while on vacation before returning to their cabin along with Tera, a girl Nick picked up at the party. After Vicky, Josh and Erin have gone to sleep, they are attacked by a masked assailant, Edgar, who incapacitates Vicky and Josh with tranquillizer darts. Nick, who has been locked outside, sees Edgar attack Erin and manages to free Tera before being shot with tranquillizer himself. Tera flees to the group's boat but is caught by Edgar.

Nick, Erin and Vicky wake to find themselves chained up in a feed lot barn. Josh has been separated and is chained and gagged separately between the stalls. The barn's owner and Edgar's boss, Wayne, tells them that they are now his property and that he has to break them, like horses. Josh repeatedly swears at Wayne, so Wayne and Edgar cut out his tongue before warning the others that he will do much worse if necessary.

Edgar takes Vicky away and rapes her, with Wayne's permission. Another prisoner, Kathy, who has been at the barn longer and seems deranged, tells Erin he will do the same to her. Kathy repeatedly sings a macabre nursery rhyme, aggravating the others. Nick is chained up overnight in the "shed" to try to break his spirit, where he sees Tera's body wrapped in plastic. After Nick is returned to his stall, a car arrives. The newcomer, Amell, views the prisoners and agrees to buy Vicky, disappointing Wayne who had hoped he would take at least three. Vicky is shut in a box and carried away: Wayne tells the others that she will be sold on as a sex slave. When Josh continues to incoherently protest, Wayne fatally shoots him in the head.

A couple stop their car at the farm to ask for directions and their daughter wanders into the barn. When she tells her parents what she saw, Edgar immediately kills them with a knife, then hunts down the girl with a shotgun. Concerned that the girl has passed something to Nick, Edgar drags him out of his stall, but Nick is able to free himself and kills Edgar with a crowbar. He then ambushes Wayne, suffering a knife wound in the process, and locks him in one of the stalls before releasing Erin and Kathy.

As they drive away in Edgar's truck, Kathy insists they take a left turn, and they see lit buildings ahead. Nick goes to investigate, telling the two women to stay behind, but Kathy goes after him, looking for cigarettes. While she is trying to persuade Kathy to return to hiding, Erin is attacked and killed by Wayne. It is revealed that Kathy is in fact Wayne's wife and accomplice. Nick finds a young woman, Liz, locked in a box, and then realizes Kathy's deception. He hides in the box himself and shoots Kathy when she comes to check on "Liz". Nick gives Liz Kathy's gun, then goes looking for Erin, but is shot with buckshot by Wayne. Liz arrives to hold Wayne at gunpoint, but is unable to pull the trigger; however, her distraction enables Nick to injure and then kill Wayne with a circular saw.

A badly wounded Nick tells Liz that everything will be alright. However, Kathy reappears and shoots them both. In a final scene, Kathy is shown buying another remote barn from a real estate agent.

== Cast ==
- Christian Walker as Nick
- Jeannette Comans as Erin, Nick's younger sister
- John Still as Wayne, the slave lot owner
- Patrick Cox as Edgar, Wayne's scarred assistant
- Stacy Still as Kathy
- Scott Fletcher as Josh
- Scarlet Williams as Vicky
