= Let's Make a Movie =

- Directed by: Elana A. Mugdan
- Starring: Hallie York; Johnathan Fernandez; Brian Cheng; Eric James Eastman
- Cinematography: Dave Dodds
- Edited by: Ricky Monroe
- Release dates: December 14, 2010 (Hollywood Reel); December 14, 2012 (United States)
- Running time: 96 minutes
- Country: United States
- Language: English

Let's Make a Movie, also titled Director's Cut is a 2010 American independent comedy-drama film and the directorial debut of Elana A. Mugdan. The film won Best Comedy at the NYC Downtown Feature Film Festival in 2011, the Indie Spirit Award in the Boston International Film Festival and the Indie Spirit Award at the New Hope Film Festival in 2011.

== Plot ==
Let's Make a Movie is the story of Cassie Thompson (played by York), a college dropout and ex-film student who is tired of being disrespected and downtrodden. In a subconscious effort to turn her life around, she decides to make a movie. The only problem is that she has no money, and her cast and crew are neurotic and inexperienced.

== Production ==
Elana A. Mugdan shot the film under the title, Director's Cut, in Little Neck as well as in several Long Island and Manhattan locales in February 2010. The film was said to be autobiographical and draws upon the films that Mugdan made as a child with a home video camera. Mugdan wrote the screenplay for the film in August 2009 and shot it with a $30,000 budget in winter 2010, wrapping up principal photography by May. The film premiered in December 2010 at the Hollywood Reel Independent Film Festival and was later accepted to other festivals across the nation, winning a total of 4 awards. The official trailer was released on September 15, 2012

== Reception ==
The film received many early reviews and media attention by bloggers, independent filmmakers and websites promoting low budget, independent filmmaking, in addition to local newspapers and magazines. Movie critic Mark Bell of Film Threat wrote, "Let's Make a Movie captures the innocence of filmmaking at that stage when you've just got to film something, do anything, or else you feel like you're going to be consumed by a life spent doing something you never wanted to do." Despite the positive review, Film Threat gave the film only 2 out of 5 stars. Felix Vasquez Jr. of Cinema Crazed Magazine praised the film, and wrote "and in the end Let's Make a Movie is a charming and entertaining indie film about making indie films", the magazine gave the film 3 out of 3 stars. Catherine Tosko, the editor for Filmmaking Review Magazine wrote "In my opinion, this film should be given out at film school. First time film students should be made to watch it as part of their syllabus", the magazine gave the film 3.5 out of 5 stars.
