= Lumpaci the Vagabond (1936 film) =

1936 film directed by Géza von Bolváry

- Directed by: Géza von Bolváry
- Written by: Johann Nestroy (play); Max Wallner (screenplay)
- Produced by: Géza von Bolváry (producer)
- Starring: See below
- Cinematography: Werner Brandes
- Edited by: Hermann Haller
- Music by: Hans Lang
- Release date: 1936
- Running time: 90 minutes
- Country: Austria
- Language: German

Lumpaci the Vagabond (German: Lumpacivagabundus) is a 1936 German / Austrian film directed by Géza von Bolváry, adapted from the play by Johann Nestroy.

== Cast ==
- Paul Hörbiger as Lumpazivagabundus, Knieriem
- Heinz Rühmann as Schneidergeselle Zwirn
- Hans Holt as Tischlergeselle Leim
- Hilde Krahl as Pepi, Leim's Frau
- Alice Brandt as Signorina Palpiti
- Anton Pointner as Graf von Monte Cristo
- Fritz Imhoff as Strudl, Wirt
- Ferdinand Mayerhofer as Hoblmann
- Edith Wolff as Paula
- Eduard Loibner as Herbergswirt
- Richard Eybner as Baptiste
- Karl Skraup as Hausierer
- Karl Forest as Schneidermeister
- Traudl Link
- Lieselotte Nekut
- Gretl Wagner
- Hanns Obonya as Piccolo
- Maria Holst
- Lotte Koch
- Eugen Guenther as Vagabund

== Reception ==
The film received positive reviews in Der gute Film and the Österreichische Film-Zeitung.

== See also ==
- Lumpaci the Vagabond (1922 film)
