= Lumpaci the Vagabond (1922 film) =

1922 film directed by Carl Wilhelm

- Directed by: Carl Wilhelm
- Written by: Johann Nestroy (play); Carl Wilhelm
- Produced by: Carl Wilhelm
- Starring: Hans Albers; Hans Brausewetter; Wilhelm Diegelmann
- Cinematography: Willy Gaebel
- Production company: Carl Wilhelm-Film
- Distributed by: UFA
- Release date: 12 September 1922
- Country: Germany
- Languages: Silent; German intertitles

Lumpaci the Vagabond (German: Der böse Geist) is a 1922 German silent film directed by Carl Wilhelm and starring Hans Albers, Hans Brausewetter, and Wilhelm Diegelmann.

The film's sets were designed by the art director Carl Ludwig Kirmse.

== Cast ==
In alphabetical order

- Hans Albers
- Hans Brausewetter
- Wilhelm Diegelmann
- Josefine Dora
- Adolphe Engers
- Karl Etlinger
- Hermann Picha
- Fritz Richard
- Otto Sauter-Sarto
- Hermine Sterler

== Reception ==
Paimanns Filmlisten wrote:"The film emphasizes the excellent performance by a carefully selected ensemble, to which the success of the picture is largely due. The subject matter takes a subordinate role. The presentation and photos are very nice, apart from a few buildings that are too modern for the Biedermeier period. The film can be described as "a picture that stands out above the average."

== See also ==
- Lumpaci the Vagabond (1936)

== Bibliography ==
- Parish, James Robert (1977). Film Actors Guide: Western Europe. Metuchen, NJ: Scarecrow Press. ISBN 978-0-8108-1044-0.
