= Lord Byron (film) =

Lord Byron is a film by Zack Godshall and Ross Brupbacher. It premiered at the 2011 Sundance Film Festival and is garnering praise from the industry as a technical achievement and from critics as an important work of Southern United States fiction.
