= Rhedosaurus =

Fictional dinosaur

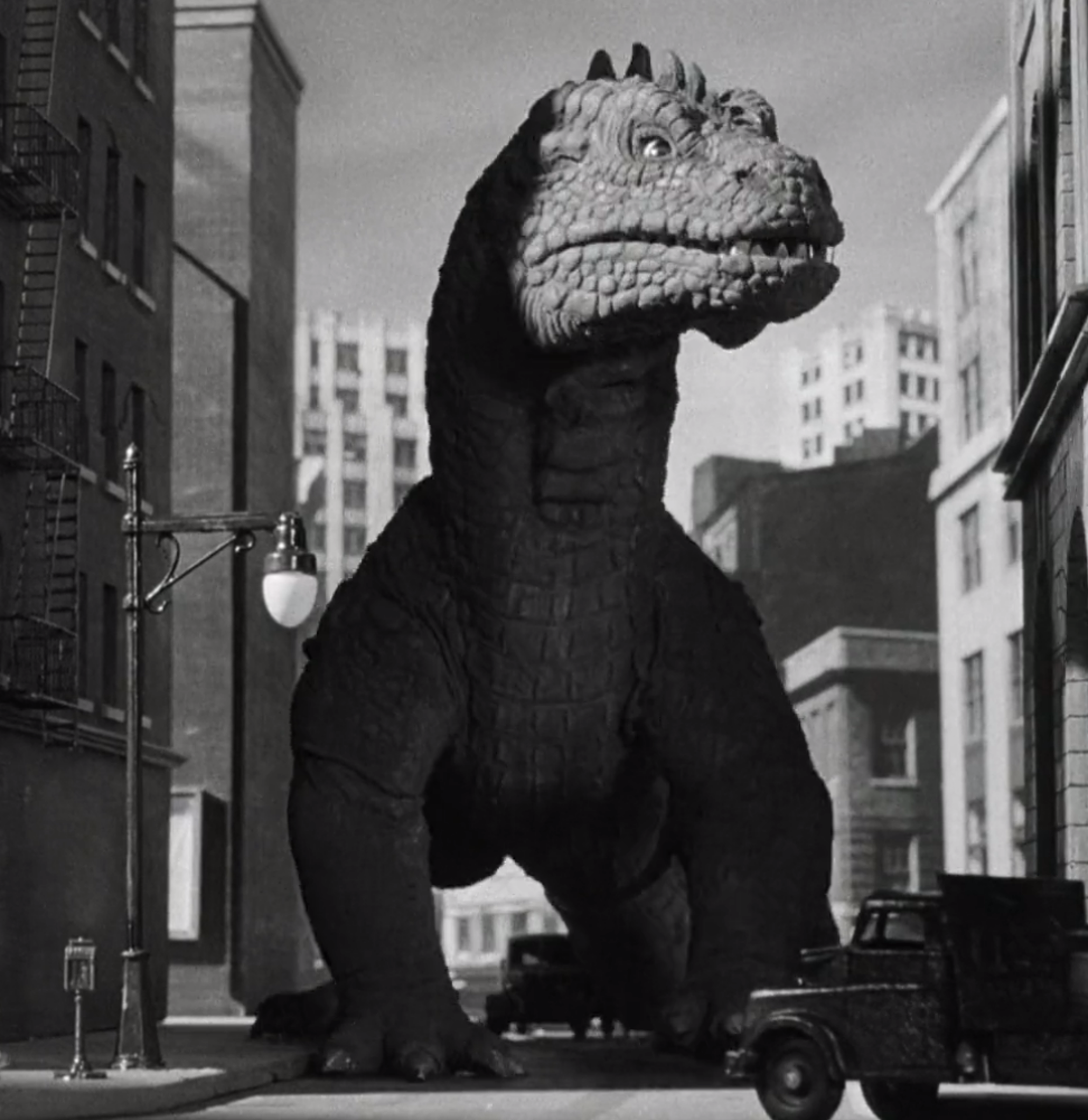
- The Rhedosaurus as portrayed via stop motion animation by Ray Harryhausen in The Beast from 20,000 Fathoms (1953)
- First appearance: The Beast from 20,000; Fathoms (1953)
- Last appearance: Planet of Dinosaurs (1977)
- Created by: Ray Harryhausen; Eugène Lourié; Ray Bradbury; Hal Chester
- Based on: Dinosaur in "The Fog Horn" (1951) by Ray Bradbury
- Adapted by: Eugène Lourié; Fred Freiberger; Robert Smith; Louis Morheim; Ray Harryhausen; Hal Chester
- Designed by: Ray Harryhausen; Eugène Lourié

In-universe information
- Aliases: The Beast; Sea Serpent; Herman; Atomic Monster
- Species: Giant dinosaur
- Origin: New York (original home); Baffin Bay (revivification)

The Rhedosaurus is a giant movie monster resembling a giant dinosaur lizard that debuted in the 1953 monster film The Beast from 20,000 Fathoms, directed and co-written by Eugène Lourié. The Rhedosaurus is depicted as a giant, destructive, prehistoric reptile that is immune to most modern artillery in its major on-screen appearance. It would later appear in the 1977 science fiction film Planet of Dinosaurs.

The prehistoric sea monster that became the Rhedosaurus was initially conceived by the writer Ray Bradbury for his short story "The Fog Horn", which appeared in the June 23, 1951 issue of The Saturday Evening Post. Prior to deciding to adapt Bradbury's creature from the story and the artwork by James R. Bingham, Ray Harryhausen, and Eugène Lourié went through many draft designs for producers Hal E. Chester and Jack Dietz, who desired to make a monster film due to the successful 1952 re-release of King Kong (1933). After considering using existing dinosaurs such as an Allosaurus, Harryhausen and Lourié eventually decided to invent a new fictional creature; its appearance later infuriated scientists and students alike upon its release. Harryhausen ultimately made two models based on his concept art before concluding on a fearsome-looking design with the producers' approval and portraying the creature in the film via stop motion animation.

The Rhedosaurus is one of the most influential and iconic fictional monsters in the history of cinema. It inspired film monsters such as Godzilla and Gamera and set the template for giant monster and kaiju in films, including: Them! (1954), Godzilla (1954), The Deadly Mantis (1957), 20 Million Miles to Earth, The Giant Claw (both 1957), The Giant Behemoth (1959), Gorgo (1961), and Gamera, the Giant Monster (1965). Homages to the creature appear in media such as a 1956 issue of the comic book series Batman, the 1970 film When Dinosaurs Ruled the Earth, the 1977 film Planet of Dinosaurs, and the comic book miniseries Dinosaurs Attack!.

== Appearances ==
Since its debut in 1953, the Rhedosaurus has been featured in various entertainment media, including films, comic books, novels, and television programs. With each appearance, artists would slightly change the character's design.

=== Film ===
The Rhedosaurus made its first on-screen appearance in Eugène Lourié's 1953 film The Beast from 20,000 Fathoms. In the film, the dinosaur is awakened from its over-100-million-year slumber in suspended animation under the Arctic by an atomic bomb detonation and travels south towards the location of its original home, now New York City, on a devastating rampage. After it creates $300 million in damage while wandering around the city, it is ultimately killed on Coney Island by a radionuclide that is directly shot into the wound on its neck created by a bazooka earlier in the film.

The Rhedosaurus' next official appearance would be in the low-budget 1977 film Planet of Dinosaurs. In that film, it inhabited a Mesozoic era Earth analog which a human crew becomes stranded; this time, however, it is a smaller, brown dinosaur that is easily defeated by a larger Tyrannosaurus that chomped into his head, seemingly killing him. Stock footage of the Rhedosaurus eating a policeman in the 1953 film would appear in the 1990 horror film Gremlins 2: The New Batch, and an image of the creature from the 1953 film was also shown momentarily as an easter egg in the 2008 film Cloverfield, after the scene where the main characters are in the New York Subway.

=== Other media ===
The fictional prehistoric sea monster that the Rhedosaurus is based on first appeared in the short story "The Fog Horn", featured in the June 23, 1951 issue of The Saturday Evening Post. It later reappeared in a slightly modified version of the story in the third issue of Ray Bradbury Comics (1993), where it has a design akin to a Plesiosaur.

The beast also appears in the second and fourth issues of the 2013 comic book series Dinosaurs Attack! by IDW Publishing. In the latter issue it is shown together with several monsters, including: Gertie the Dinosaur, Godzilla, Anguirus, the Paleosaurus from The Giant Behemoth (1959), Gorgo from its 1961 self-titled film, and Reptilicus from its 1961 self-titled film. Poster art of the Rhedosaurus is briefly shown in the Godzilla Singular Point (2021) episode "Gamesome".

== Concept and creation ==
=== Development and design ===
The prehistoric sea monster that became the Rhedosaurus was originally conceived by the writer Ray Bradbury for his short story "The Fog Horn", which appeared in the June 23, 1951 issue of The Saturday Evening Post. At the start of the scripting of The Beast from 20,000 Fathoms (1953), first-time science fiction film producer Hal Chester, who wanted to make a monster film in collaboration with Jack Dietz due to the successful 1952 re-release of King Kong (1933), brought Bradbury into his office to read the outline for a proposed monster film. Bradbury later recalled that upon reading the draft, he mentioned that it strongly resembled his 1951 short story and told Chester that their monsters were evidently the same one. Bradbury's friend Ray Harryhausen was also assigned to work on Chester and Dietz's film by this point and was given a copy of James R. Bingham's artwork of the creature published alongside the story in The Saturday Evening Post.

Before adapting Bradbury's sea monster, Harryhausen and director Eugène Lourié had gone through many draft designs for producers Chester and Dietz. They made sketches of an octopus (foreshadowing Harryhausen's work on the 1955 film It Came from Beneath the Sea), a leviathan, and a giant shark but Harryhausen expressed his dislike of these, leading him to "experiment" with other concepts such as an octopus-like alien and a beast akin to a dragon. When the pair decided to make the creature a dinosaur based on the sea beast, Harryhausen said he did not want a "normal" dinosaur such as the Allosaurus, Tyrannosaurus or Brontosaurus, with the latter because he did not want his creation to seem similar to his mentor Willis H. O'Brien's dinosaurs featured in The Lost World (1925). Therefore, Harryhausen and Lourié eventually invented a new fictional giant four-legged creature, with a menacing appearance.

Sometime during designing, the creature was dubbed the "Rhedosaurus" by a crew member who Harryhausen suggested may have been Chester, though this remains unconfirmed. He also considered the fact that the first two letters in the dinosaur's name are the same as his initials are coincidental, despite some people saying the beast's name was partly derived from his. Warner Bros. later gave it the nickname "Herman".

=== Modelling and portrayal ===
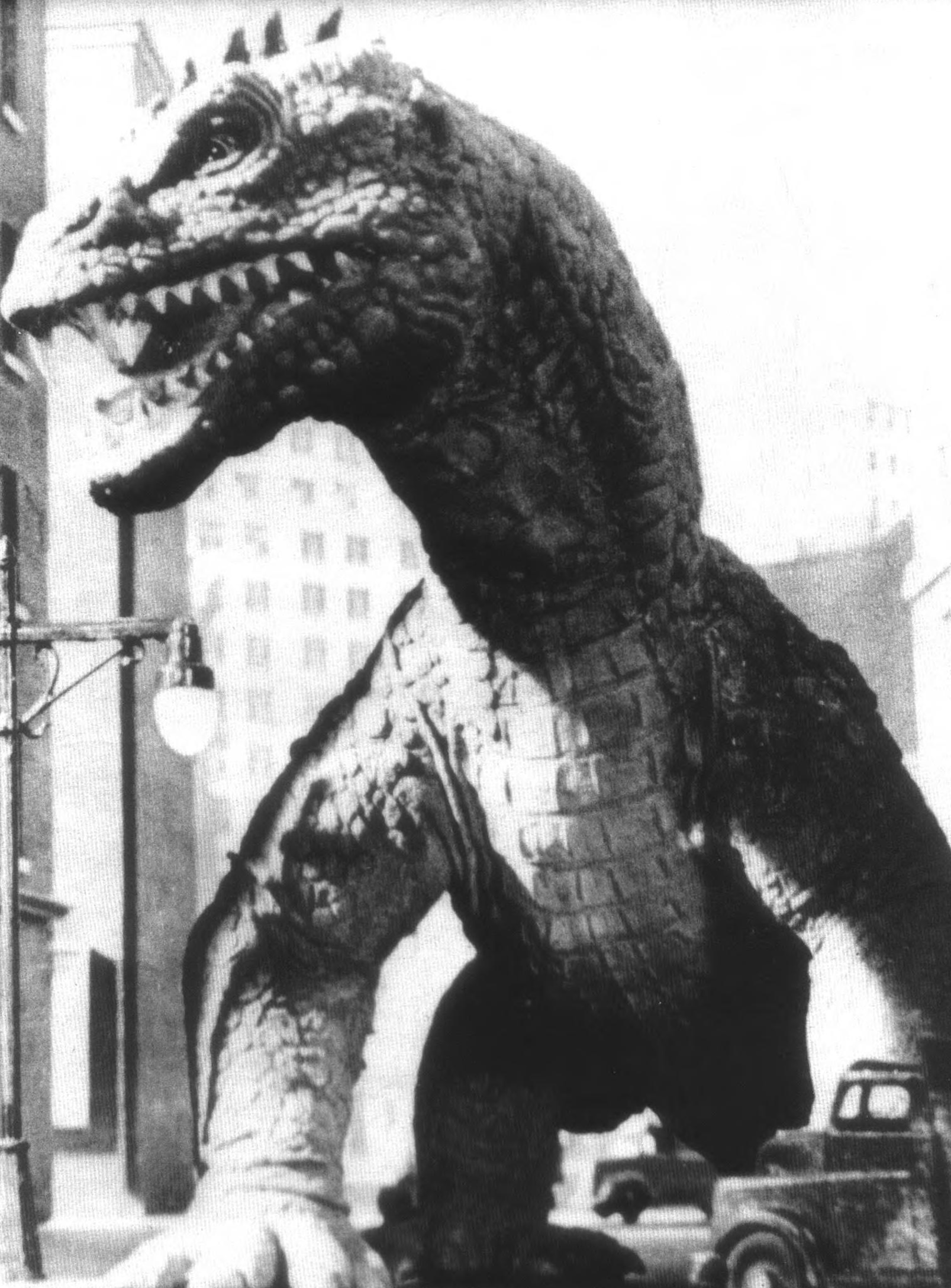
The model used by Harryhausen to portray the Rhedosaurus in its 1953 film

Following a few rough sketches of the beast's structure on paper and discussing storyboards for the film, Ray Harryhausen constructed a clay prototype of the Rhedosaurus and then used it to make a model out of latex, which he revealed to the two producers. However, everyone, including himself, who saw this model voiced their disappointment with its "babyish" and "kind" appearance. Harryhausen took the model back to his workroom and broke the model apart, recreating it with a stronger, more reptilian head and thicker legs. In his book The Art of Ray Harryhausen, he stated that it gave the beast what he desired was a more scarify look, however, after making some test footage he "realized that it still wasn't right" and remade it a third and final time before using it for the film.

To portray his stop motion animated model of the giant beast tumulting in a particular setting in the 1953 film, Harryhausen invented a method for screen projection that divided the plates into foreground and backdrop imagery one frame at a time. He later described how he undertook this projection process: "I split the screen in front of the 16mm camera by using a glass with blacked out portions where the model was standing. After photographing one portion, I would rewind the exposed film, black out the already exposed half, and then photograph the blacked out portion of the projection plate. Theoretically, the whole thing would look like the model was part of the picture." The process, later dubbed "Dynamation" by producer Charles Schneer, was an inexpensive and successful technique for Harryhausen and consequently would refine throughout his career, becoming a hallmark of his work.

Additionally, Harryhausen designed and supervised the creation of all the large models that the Rhedosaurus destroys in the picture, which Willis Cook assembled. Harryhausen said that his experience utilizing the Rhedosaurus in the production later partially inspired his monster Ymir in 20 Million Miles to Earth (1957).

== Characteristics ==
=== Physical appearance ===
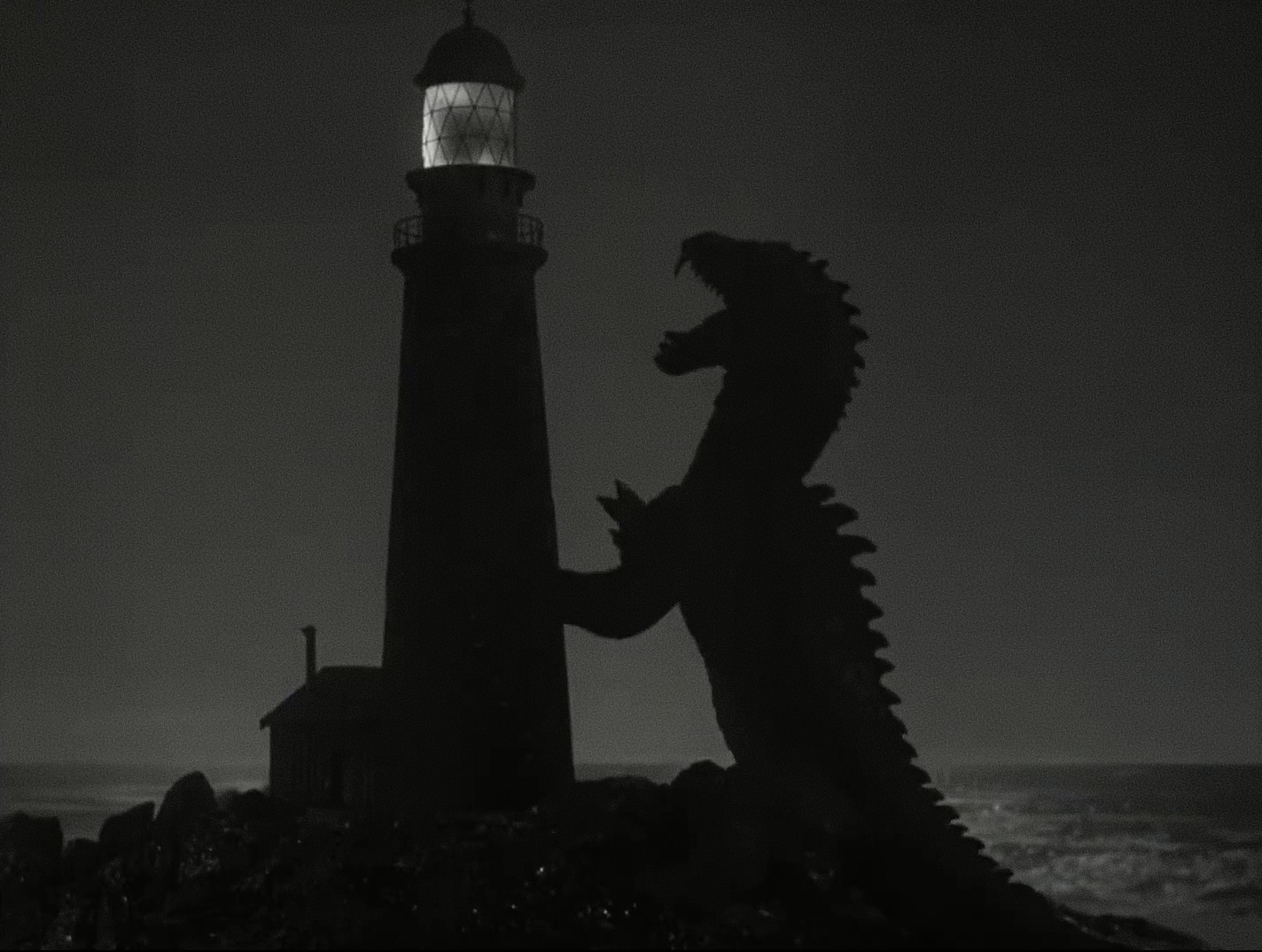
The beast stands on its two back legs in order to destroy a lighthouse in the 1953 film

In the original film, the Rhedosaurus is depicted as a massive dinosaur, belonging to the fictional species of the same name. Standing at 40 feet (12 m) in height and weighing five hundred tons, it has mostly quadrupedal behavior, with the occasional bipedal stance when destroying structures such as a lighthouse or building. The head, which is relatively small in proportion to its body has a single row of spines on being on the back of its head and continues running down from the top of its head to the end of its long, prehensile tail. In the low-budget 1977 film Planet of Dinosaurs, its physical appearance would remain relatively the same, however, this version would be colored brown and smaller than the previous incarnation.

=== Powers and abilities ===
In its debut film, the Rhedosaurus is depicted as able to easily adaptable to different environments, having survived in suspended animation for over 100 million years, and equally capable of moving on land and swimming under the ocean. It uses the latter to travel from Baffin Bay to the location that was originally its home millions of years ago, now known as New York. The beast also has a powerful jaw that is capable of tossing cars and allows it to grab humans and eat them (as shown when it eats a police officer while rampaging in New York). Upon being harmed by the armed forces, the Rhedosaurus's blood is revealed to contain an ancient virus that the human immune system has no protection against once exposed to it. In Planet of Dinosaurs, the Rhedosaurus is a smaller and more defenseless creature and is easily defeated by a Tyrannosaurus rex that chomps on its head.

== Reception ==
Upon the release of The Beast from 20,000 Fathoms (1953), the Rhedosaurus initially received widespread criticism from dinosaur enthusiasts, especially scientists and students of paleontology. They considered the creature's design and portrayal in the film to be unrealistic and complained that the filmmakers should have used an actual dinosaur instead of creating a new fictional one. In an attempt to placate them, director Eugène Lourié told reporters they invented the creature because the crew felt an unoriginal creation would not meet their intention of striking fear into twentieth century theatergoers: "We wanted a brand new monster who looks more frightening enough to throw a large city into a panic. So we concocted a forty-foot [12 meter] rhedosaurus. A more evil-looking, blood-thirsty, powerful creature than [the] thing the museum people have uncovered." In contrast, critics have mostly praised the Rhedosaurus, especially acclaiming its animation by Ray Harryhausen.

=== Cultural impact ===
Many retrospective commentators have praised this film's monster as influential, due to it possibly being the foundation of the Atomic Age giant monster genre, the first entirely fictional dinosaur to appear on-screen, and the first monster in a film to be associated with an atomic weapon.

The monster and its 1953 film, inspired film monsters such as Godzilla and Gamera and set the template for giant monsters and kaiju in films, including: Them! (1954), Godzilla (1954), The Deadly Mantis (1957), 20 Million Miles to Earth, The Giant Claw (both 1957), The Giant Behemoth (1959), Gorgo (1961), and Gamera, the Giant Monster (1965). Homages to the creature appear in media such as a 1956 issue of the comic book series Batman, the 1970 film When Dinosaurs Ruled the Earth, and the comic book miniseries Dinosaurs Attack!.

== See also ==
- Cultural depictions of dinosaurs
