= The Beast from 20,000 Fathoms =

1953 monster film by Eugène Lourié

- Theatrical release poster
- Directed by: Eugène Lourié
- Screenplay by: Lou Morheim; Fred Freiberger
- Based on: "The Fog Horn" by Ray Bradbury
- Produced by: Jack Dietz; Hal E. Chester
- Starring: Paul Christian; Paula Raymond; Cecil Kellaway; Kenneth Tobey; Lee Van Cleef; King Donovan
- Cinematography: John L. Russell
- Edited by: Bernard W. Burton
- Music by: David Buttolph
- Production company: Mutual Productions
- Distributed by: Warner Bros. Pictures
- Release date: June 13, 1953 (U.S.)
- Running time: 80 minutes
- Country: United States
- Language: English
- Budget: $210,000–285,000
- Box office: $5 million

The Beast from 20,000 Fathoms is a 1953 American monster film directed by Eugène Lourié in his directorial debut, with stop motion animation by Ray Harryhausen. It is partly based on Ray Bradbury's 1951 short story, first published in The Saturday Evening Post, which was later reprinted as "The Fog Horn". In the film a giant dinosaur, the Rhedosaurus, is released from its frozen state in the Arctic by an atomic bomb test. Paul Christian stars as Thomas Nesbitt, the foremost surviving witness of the creature before it causes havoc while traveling toward New York. Paula Raymond, Cecil Kellaway, and Kenneth Tobey are featured in supporting roles.

Jack Dietz and Hal E. Chester arranged the production of a monster movie in response to the successful 1952 re-release of King Kong (1933). While Lou Morheim and Fred Freiberger were solely credited for screenwriting, many contributed to writing the film, including Dietz, Harryhausen, and Lourié. On an estimated $210,000–285,000 budget, principal photography occurred in New York from July to August 1952, under the title The Monster from Beneath the Sea. Harryhausen and Willis Cook created the special effects over roughly six months. In 1953, Warner Bros. Pictures bought the film for $400,000–800,000, retitled it, and hired David Buttolph to replace Michel Michelet's original score.

The Beast from 20,000 Fathoms was released throughout the United States in June 1953, to widespread critical praise for its special effects. The film grossed over $5 million worldwide, making it one of the highest-grossing films of 1953. It pioneered the "atomic monster" genre and is credited with launching the giant monster and kaiju movie trend that ensued after its initial release. Godzilla (1954) is often cited as having taken inspiration from the film. In recent years, The Beast from 20,000 Fathoms has acquired a cult following and has been listed among the greatest science fiction, horror, and B movies of the 1950s.

== Plot ==
Far north of the Arctic Circle, near Baffin Bay, a nuclear bomb test, dubbed "Operation Experiment", is conducted. Prophetically, right after the blast, physicist Thomas Nesbitt muses "What the cumulative effects of all these atomic explosions and tests will be, only time will tell". The explosion awakens a 200-foot (61 m) long carnivorous dinosaur known as a Rhedosaurus, thawing it out of the ice where it had been held in suspended animation for millions of years. Nesbitt is the only surviving witness to the beast's awakening and later is dismissed out-of-hand as being delirious at the time of his sighting. Despite the skepticism, he persists, knowing what he saw.

The dinosaur begins making its way down the east coast of North America, sinking a fishing ketch off the Grand Banks, destroying another near Marquette, Canada, wrecking a lighthouse in Maine, and destroying buildings in Massachusetts. Nesbitt eventually gains allies in paleontologist Thurgood Elson and his young female assistant Lee Hunter after one of the surviving fishermen identifies from a collection of drawings the very same dinosaur that Nesbitt had identified. Plotting the sightings of the beast's appearances on a map for skeptical military officers, Elson proposes the dinosaur is returning to the Hudson River area, where fossils of Rhedosaurus were first found. In a diving bell search of the undersea Hudson River Canyon, Professor Elson is killed after his bell is swallowed by the beast, which eventually comes ashore in Manhattan. It devours a police officer shooting at it, totals cars, knocks over buildings, and generally causes a panicking frenzy. A later newspaper report of its rampage lists "180 known dead. 1500 injured. Damage estimated at $300,000,000".

Meanwhile, military troops led by Colonel Jack Evans attempt to stop the Rhedosaurus with an electrified barricade, then blast a hole with a bazooka in the beast's throat, which drives it back into the sea. Unfortunately, it bleeds all over the streets of New York, unleashing a horrible, virulent prehistoric contagion, which begins to infect the populace, causing even more fatalities. The infection precludes blowing up the Rhedosaurus or even setting it ablaze, lest the contagion spread further. It is decided to shoot a radioactive isotope into the beast's neck wound with hopes of burning it from the inside, while at the same time neutralizing the contagion.

When the Rhedosaurus comes ashore and reaches the Coney Island amusement park, military sharpshooter Corporal Stone takes a rifle grenade loaded with a potent radioactive isotope and along with Nesbitt climbs on board the Coney Island Cyclone roller coaster. Riding the coaster to the top of the tracks to get to eye-level with the beast, Stone fires the isotope into the open neck wound. The Rhedosaurus thrashes about in reaction. When the roller coaster cars crash to the ground, a fire starts, setting the amusement park ablaze. With the fire spreading rapidly, Nesbitt and Stone climb down as the park becomes engulfed in flames. The Rhedosaurus collapses and eventually dies from the isotope's radiation poisoning.

== Cast ==
- Paul Christian as Professor Tom Nesbitt
- Paula Raymond as Lee Hunter
- Cecil Kellaway as Professor Thurgood Elson
- Kenneth Tobey as Colonel Jack Evans
- Donald Woods as Captain Phil Jackson
- Lee Van Cleef as Corporal Stone
- Steve Brodie as Sergeant Loomis
- Ross Elliott as Professor George Ritchie
- Jack Pennick as Jacob Bowman
- Ray Hyke as Sergeant Willistead
- Mary Hill as Miss Ryan, Nesbitt's secretary
- Michael Fox as an ER doctor
- Alvin Greenman as a radar operator
- Frank Ferguson as Doctor Morton
- King Donovan as Doctor Ingersoll

Uncredited

- Roy Engel as Major Evans
- Leo Mostovoy as Captain Georges LeMay
- James Best as a radar operator
- Bill Woodson as a radio announcer
- Merv Griffin as a radio announcer (voice)
- Edward Clark as the lighthouse keeper

== Production ==
=== Development ===
The Beast from 20,000 Fathoms had a production budget of around $200,000. Lourié asserted that the budget was $210,000; Chester said it was US$240,000; and Variety reported $285,000 was spent on the film.

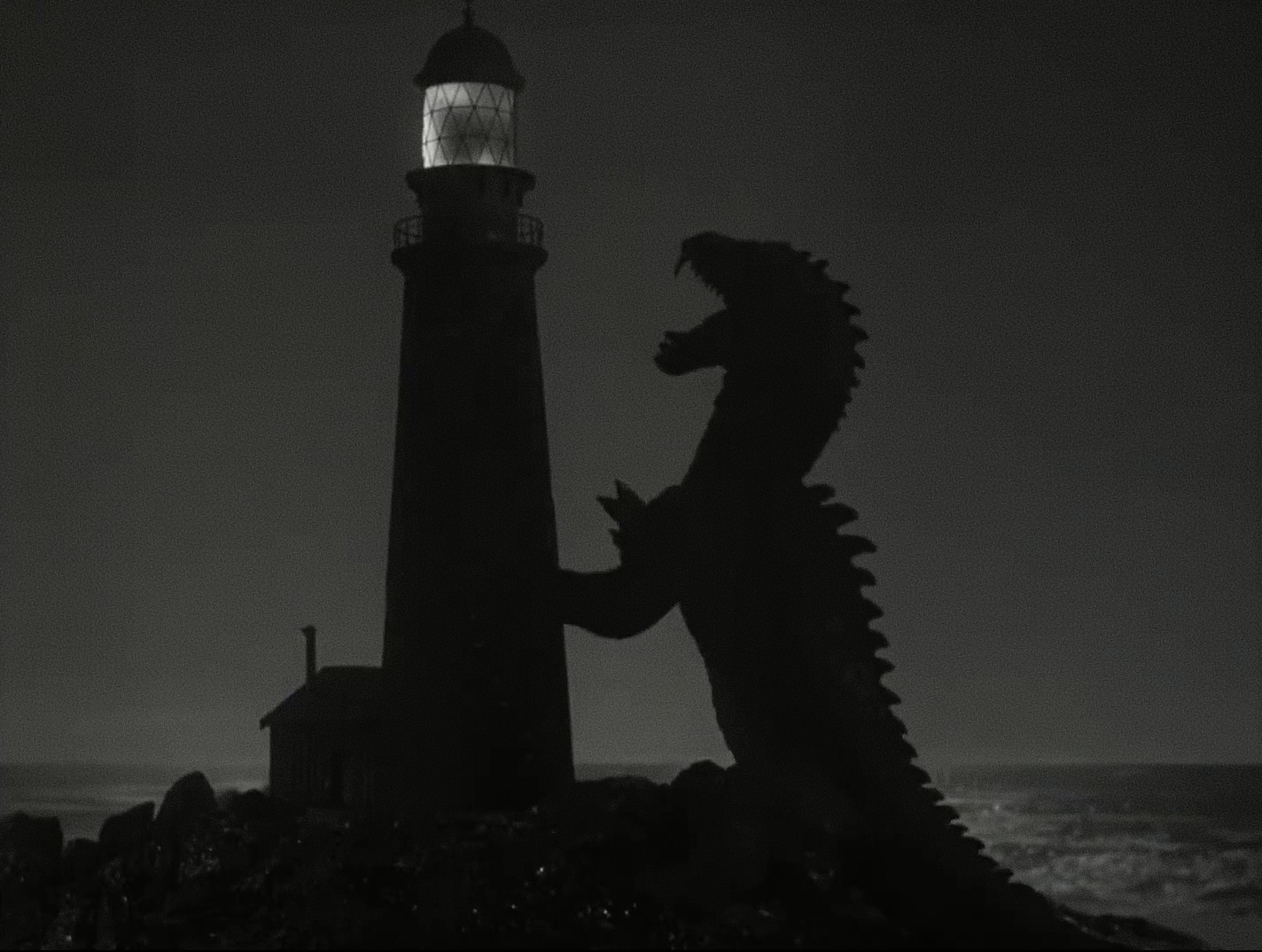
The Beast destroys a lighthouse in the film. This entire sequence is directly based upon Ray Bradbury's "The Fog Horn".

The film was first announced in the trades on July 30, 1951, as The Monster from Beneath the Sea, one of 16 titles the newly formed Mutual Films Corporation were readying for production. This appeared exactly a week after Ray Bradbury had his short story "The Beast from 20,000 Fathoms" published in The Saturday Evening Post, which was later anthologized under the title "The Fog Horn". During preproduction, in the spring of 1952, according to Ray Harryhausen, Dietz showed him an illustration of the monster from the Ray Bradbury story published the previous year. This story was about a marine-based prehistoric dinosaur that destroys a lighthouse. A similar sequence appeared in the draft script of The Monster from Beneath the Sea. During production, Bradbury visited his friend Harryhausen at the studio and was invited to read the script. When Bradbury pointed out to the producers similarities to his short story, they quickly bought the rights to his story. When Warner Bros. bought The Monster from Beneath the Sea from Mutual over a year later, they changed the film's title to match the story's title. Bradbury's name was used extensively in their promotional campaign. It also had an on-screen credit that read "Suggested by The Saturday Evening Post story by Ray Bradbury".

Lou Morheim and Fred Freiberger received the sole on-screen screenplay credit, but the script began as producer Jack Dietz's initial treatment. Eugène Lourié wrote that he was given the responsibility "to get a playable screenplay in the shortest possible time" and that he worked with a friend "who for personal reasons chose not to be named" to craft "a storyline showing live characters and action." That draft was then delivered to producer Hal E. Chester to be polished by writers under contract to Mutual.

Later accounts state that Lourié, effects director Ray Harryhausen, and writer Robert Smith contributed to subsequent drafts adapting Dietz's material; none were credited on screen. A copy of the shooting script held at the Margaret Herrick Library credits the screenplay to Louis Morheim and Robert Smith. Smith and Lourié continued to collaborate after Beast; in May 1954 the Los Angeles Times reported they had formed a company to produce Bottom of the World, a Jules Verne adaptation, with Smith preparing the script and Lourié to direct.

Because Lourié had not named his collaborator, retrospective sources have assumed this was a blacklisted writer working during the HUAC hearings of the early 1950s. For this reason, film historian Bill Warren identified the uncredited writer as the blacklistee Daniel James, because of his later collaborated with Lourié on The Giant Behemoth (1959) and Gorgo (1961) under the pen name Daniel Hyatt.

=== Creature design and effects ===
Some early pre-production conceptual sketches of the Beast showed that, at one point, it was to have a shelled head and later was to have a beak. Creature effects were assigned to Harryhausen, a protégé of King Kong co-creator Willis O'Brien. The film monster looks nothing like the Brontosaurus-type creature of the short story. It is instead a kind of Tyrannosaurus-type prehistoric predator, though quadrupedal in stature. The monster was unlike any real carnivorous dinosaur and more closely resembled a rauisuchian. A drawing of the creature was published along with the story in The Saturday Evening Post.

According to author A. T. McKenna, at one point, there were plans to have the Beast snort flames, but this idea was dropped before production began due to budget restrictions. The concept was later used for the film's poster and allegedly became an inspiration for Godzilla's atomic breath.

=== Filming ===
The climactic roller coaster live-action scenes were filmed on location at the Pike in Long Beach, California, and featured the Cyclone Racer entrance ramp, ticket booth, loading platform and beach views of the structure. Split-matte, in-camera special effects by Harryhausen effectively combined the live action of the actors and the roller coaster background footage from the Pike's parking lot with the stop-motion animation of the Beast's destroying a shooting miniature of the coaster.

In a scene attempting to identify the Rhedosaurus, Professor Tom Nesbitt rifles through dinosaur drawings by Charles R. Knight, a man whom Harryhausen claimed as an inspiration. The dinosaur skeleton featured in the museum sequence is artificial; it was obtained from RKO Pictures' prop storage where it had been constructed for its classic comedy Bringing Up Baby (1938).

=== Music ===
An original music score was composed by Michel Michelet, but when Warner Bros. purchased the film, it had a new score written by David Buttolph. Ray Harryhausen had been hoping that his film music hero Max Steiner, under contract at the time with Warner Bros., would write the film score. Steiner had written the landmark score for RKO's King Kong in 1933. Unfortunately for Harryhausen, Steiner had too many commitments, but Buttolph composed one of his more memorable and powerful scores, setting much of the tone for giant monster film music of the 1950s.

== Release ==
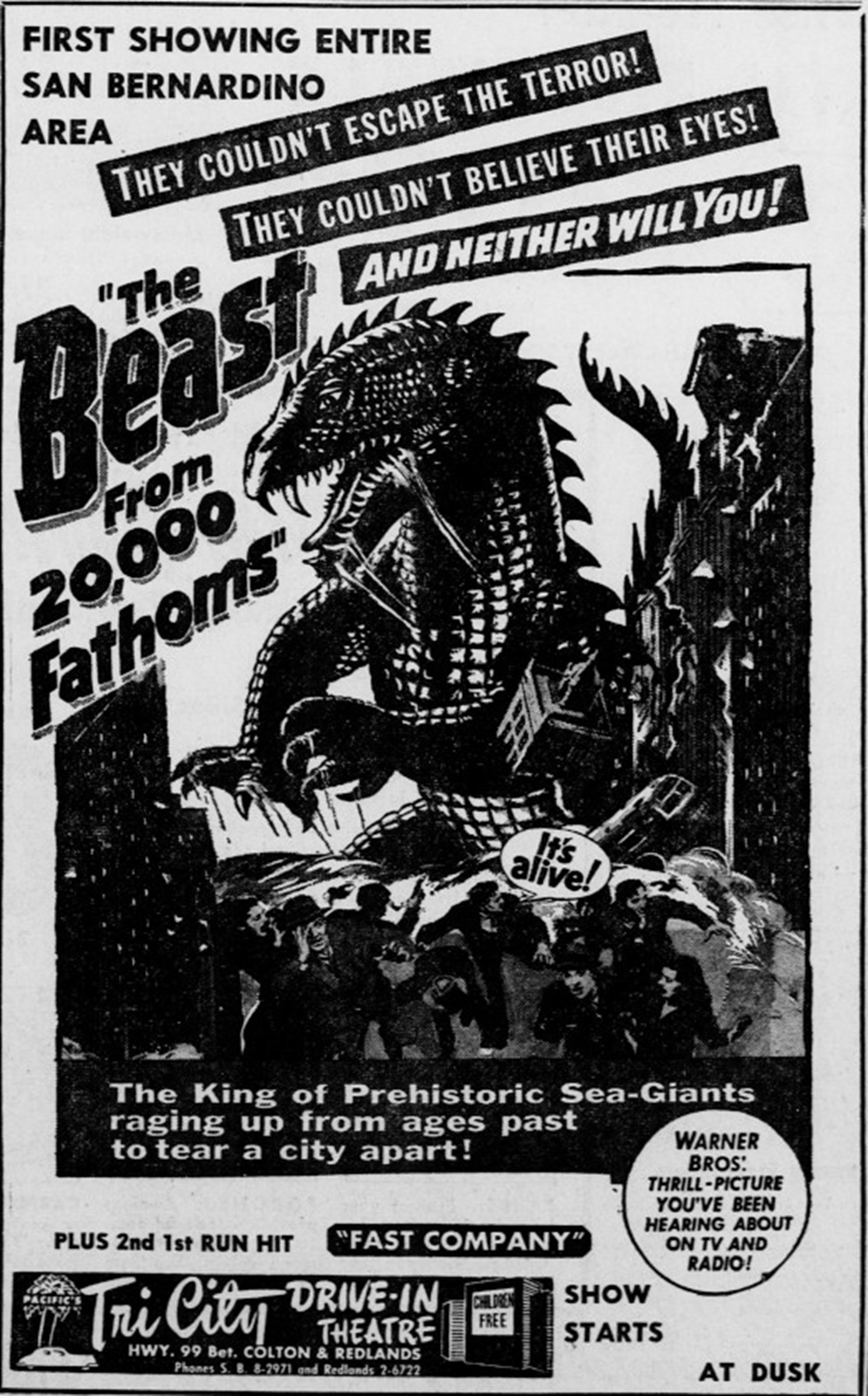
Drive-in advertisement from 1953

Warner Bros. Pictures acquired the film for $400,000, $450,000, or $800,000 and launched a large advertising campaign for its June 13, 1953 release. Sources differ on the exact day it was distributed that month, though Harrison's Reports and the official websites of the AFI and Warner Bros suggest it was the 13th. However, many contemporaneous American newspapers from June 1953 reported the opening date as the 17th. Boxoffice listed the film's distribution date as 27th. The 1954 Film Daily Year Book of Motion Pictures cited the 24th, which Variety stated was its New York premiere. Original prints of Beast were sepia toned. The film earned roughly $2.25 million at the North American box office and more than $5 million worldwide. (Note: Attributed to multiple references:) It is believed to have been a sleeper hit.

== Reception ==
=== Critical response ===
According to Turner Classic Movies (TCM), The Beast was met with a mixed critical reception, but garnered unanimous praise for its special effects. In July 1953, Boxoffice analyzed that contemporary critical reviews were generally positive. Famous Monsters of Filmland described the initial critical response as "respectable".

Harrison's Reports described the film as a "fantastic horror-melodrama", adding that it is a "highly exciting thriller of its type". Hy Hollinger of Variety lauded Harryhausen's effects, Lourié's direction, and the acting of Christian and Kellaway; he also felt the script and cinematography were documentary-like. Hollinger directed criticism towards Raymond's performance citing it as "too still" and "unconvincing".

TCM said the review from The New York Times was "lukewarm". The reviewer wrote: "And though the sight of the gigantic monster rampaging through such areas as Wall Street and Coney Island sends the comparatively ant-like humans on the screen scurrying away in an understandable tizzy, none of the customers in the theater seemed to be making for the hills. On sober second thought, however, this might have been sensible".

=== Reception of the Rhedosaurus ===
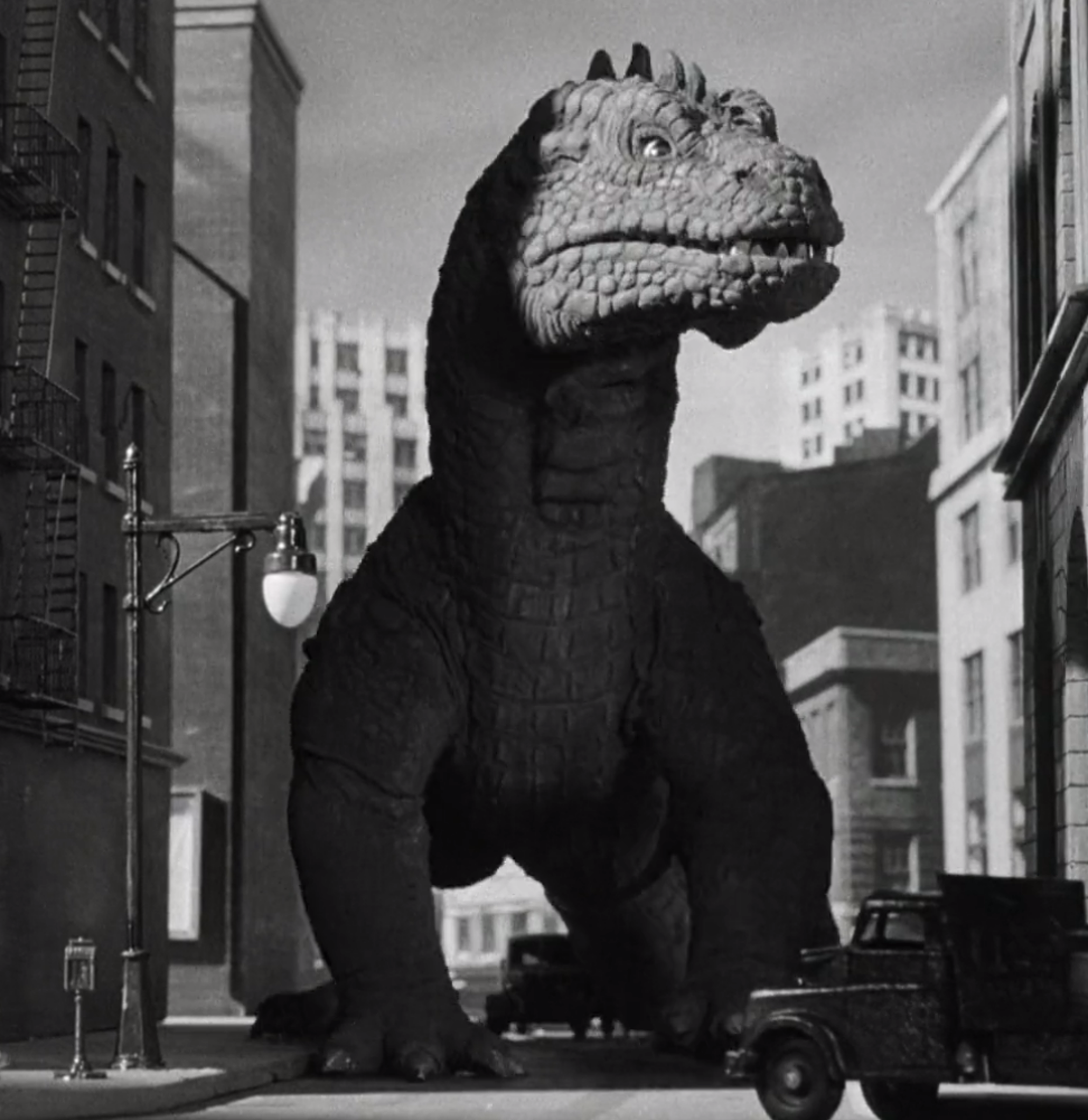
Rhedosaurus roaming New York City

The Rhedosaurus was largely panned by dinosaur experts, who felt that its depiction was unrealistic. These viewers also complained that the filmmakers should have used an actual dinosaur instead of creating a fictional one. Lourié subsequently explained that the Rhedosaurus was created because the crew agreed that a regular dinosaur would not frighten modern-day audiences.

== Legacy ==
=== Aftermath and cultural influence ===
The film's financially successful release and RKO's re-release of King Kong spawned the giant monster film genre of the 1950s. It is considered the first live-action film to feature a giant monster unleashed by an atomic bomb. According to numerous retrospective sources, Ishirō Honda's Godzilla (1954) was heavily inspired by the film and this concept. Its initial proposal was allegedly titled The Giant Monster from 20,000 Leagues Under the Sea (海底二万哩から来た大怪獣, Kaitei ni man-mairu kara kita Daikaijū), and the original story by Shigeru Kayama featuring Godzilla destroying a lighthouse. However, producer Tomoyuki Tanaka claimed to have been ignorant of The Beast's existence. (Note: Tanaka's ignorance of the film could be attributed to the fact that The Beast from 20,000 Fathoms (原子怪獣現わる) was released in Japan after Godzilla (ゴジラ) finished production. Daiei Film distributed the film on October 17, 1954 (some sources say December 22, 1954), while Godzilla was released in Nagoya on October 27, 1954.) Authors Steve Ryfle and Ed Godziszewski noted how Japanese critics compared the two films but felt that Godzilla lacks direct resemblance to it. During his late life, Harryhausen expressed his belief that the original Godzilla film was a rip-off of The Beast, and allegedly disliked the Toho monster presumably due to the aftermath of the 1962 film King Kong vs. Godzilla.

Harryhausen continued to gain popularity for his efforts on monster movies such as It Came from Beneath the Sea (1955) and 20 Million Miles to Earth (1957). He eventually decided to venture into other genres, accepting that Godzilla and other Japanese kaiju movies were making the giant monster genre "tiresome". In 1958, the Rhedosaurus model was reused by Harryhausen to portray the dragon in The 7th Voyage of Sinbad. Likewise, Lourié later directed two productions featuring fictitious giant dinosaurs. The Giant Behemoth (1958) was a British-American co-production panned by critics for its close resemblance to The Beast; Lourié accused himself of plagiarizing from it when scripting. Gorgo (1961) is considered the British edition of a Godzilla movie or rip-off thereof.

Daiei Film later yielded the Gamera franchise. The original 1965 film Gamera, the Giant Monster depicted the titular monster that was awoken by a nuclear explosion in the Arctic and later destroys a lighthouse. Before this, Daiei Film distributed the re-released edition of RKO's King Kong in Japan in 1952, making it the first post-war release of monster movies in Japan, and these distributions presumably influenced productions of the first films of Godzilla and Gamera franchises.

The film Cloverfield (2008), which also involves a giant monster terrorizing New York City, inserts a frame from The Beast from 20,000 Fathoms (along with frames from King Kong and Them!) into the hand-held camera footage used throughout the film.

The film was featured in the TCM Greatest Classic Films Collection: Sci-Fi Adventures DVD box set along with Them!, World Without End, and Satellite in the Sky (both 1956). It was also released on standalone DVD and Blu-ray.

=== Retrospective assessment and analysis ===
Since its release, The Beast from 20,000 Fathoms has been assessed as one of the greatest monster, science fiction, and horror films of the 1950s. It was also nominated for AFI's Top 10 Science Fiction Films list, and listed among the best B-movies of its decade by Collider and Screen Rant. On the review aggregator website Rotten Tomatoes, 91% of 22 critics' reviews are positive, with an average rating of 6.7/10.

Harryhausen's stop-motion and special effects work in particular have continued to receive critical acclaim in retrospective reviews. Leonard Maltin cited Harryhausen's effects in the last act.

The Beast from 20,000 Fathoms has been analyzed as reflecting distress of the outcome of nuclear testing during the Atomic Age. Some believe that it is the first film to directly address this subject. Writers have also ofted noted how upon the bomb's detonation in the movie, one of the characters states: "Every time one of these things goes off, I feel as if we were helping to write the first chapter of a new Genesis". According to Cynthia Hendershot and Dominic Lennard, the film offers the theory that nuclear testing could result in the dominance of other lifeforms over humanity. Hendershot felt that the Rhedosaurus is a metaphor for the fears of the destruction of New York that the American public had during the 1950s.

== Works cited ==
- Berry, Mark F. (August 16, 2005). The Dinosaur Filmography. McFarland & Company. ISBN 978-0786424535.
- Harryhausen, Ray; Dalton, Tony (2003). Ray Harryhausen: An Animated Life. United States: Billboard Books. ISBN 978-0823084029.
- Johnson, John J.J. (1995). Cheap Tricks and Class Acts: Special Effects, Makeup and Stunts from the Films of the Fantastic Fifties. Jefferson, North Carolina: McFarland & Company. ISBN 0-7864-0093-5.
- Jones, Stephen (1995). The Illustrated Dinosaur Movie Guide. London: Titan Books. ISBN 1-85286-487-7.
- "Monster, Mystery and Action Films Showing at Local Theaters". Lansing State Journal. Lansing, Michigan. June 21, 1953 – via Newspapers.com.
- Poole, W. Scott. (2011). Monsters in America: Our Historical Obsession with the Hideous and the Haunting. Waco, Texas: Baylor University Press. ISBN 978-1-60258-314-6.
- Rovin, Jeff (1989). The Encyclopedia of Monsters. New York: Facts on File. ISBN 0-8160-1824-3.
- Warren, Bill (2009). Keep Watching the Skies! American Science Fiction Films of the Fifties: 21st Century Edition. McFarland & Company. ISBN 978-0-89950-032-4.
- Van Hise, James (1993). Hot Blooded Dinosaur Movies. Las Vegas: Pioneer Books. ISBN 1-55698-365-4.
- Nomura, Kohei; Fuyukado, Toshiji (2016). Godzilla 365 Days (in Japanese). Yosensha. ISBN 978-4-8003-1074-3.
- Ryfle, Steve; Godziszewski, Ed (2017). Ishiro Honda: A Life in Film, from Godzilla to Kurosawa. Wesleyan University Press. ISBN 9780819570871.
