= Pillar of Fire and Other Plays =

1975 collection of three science fiction plays by Ray Bradbury

- First edition
- Author: Ray Bradbury
- Language: English
- Genre: Fantasy, Science fiction, Supernatural
- Publisher: Simon & Schuster
- Publication date: 1975
- Publication place: United States
- Media type: Print (Paperback)
- Pages: xiv+113

Pillar of Fire and Other Plays (1975) is a collection of three science fiction plays by Ray Bradbury: Pillar of Fire, Kaleidoscope, and The Foghorn. All are adaptations of his short stories of the same names.

== See also ==
- "The Fog Horn", short story
- S Is for Space, anthology which includes the short story "Pillar of Fire"
