= Eugène Lourié =

Russian-French filmmaker, art director, and production designer (1903-1991)

- Евгений Лурье
- Born: Yevgeny Lure; 8 April 1903; Kharkov, Kharkovsky Uyezd, Kharkov Governorate, Russian Empire (now Ukraine)
- Died: 26 May 1991 (aged 88); Los Angeles, California, US
- Other names: Eugene Lourié (Note: Credited as Eugene Lourié by the American Film Institute catalogue.); Gene Lourie
- Occupations: Production designer; director; screenwriter; special effects artist; set decorator
- Years active: 1927–1983
- Spouse: Laure Lourié (m. 1940)
- Relatives: Manuel Ortíz de Zárate (father-in-law); Jadwiga Piechowska (mother-in-law)

Eugène Lourié (Russian: Евгений Лурье, romanized: Yevgeniy Lur'ye; né Yevgeny Lure; 8 April 1903 – 26 May 1991) was a Russian-French filmmaker active in interwar France and postwar Hollywood. Lourié worked primarily as an art director as well as a production designer, costume designer, director, special effects director, screenwriter and actor. In 2011, he was posthumously entered into the Art Directors Guild Hall of Fame.

== Early years ==
Yevgeny Lure was born on 8 April 1903 in Kharkov, Kharkovsky Uyezd (present-day Kharkiv, Ukraine) to Russian Jewish parents. His first experience with cinema was in 1911 when a movie theater opened in Kharkov. In 1919, during the Russian Civil War, he worked on an anti-communist film titled Black Crowes.

After he fled from the Soviet Union, he made his way to Istanbul. While there he made money for a fare to Paris, by painting and drawing movie posters. He even slept in the theater on top of a piano to save money.

== Career ==
=== Art director and production designer ===
In the 1930s, he worked as a production designer for such directors as Jean Renoir, Max Ophüls, and René Clair. As an assistant and production designer to Renoir, he worked on such French films as La Grande illusion and La Règle du Jeu. After Renoir had moved to Hollywood in the early 1940s, Lourié moved as well, and worked with other directors including Sam Fuller, Charlie Chaplin, and Robert Siodmak.

=== Science-fiction and special effects ===
In 1952, he made his directorial debut with The Beast from 20,000 Fathoms, the first of three dinosaur films that Lourié would direct. The film was profitable, but Lourié has said that he regrets that the film typecast him as a science fiction director. He decided that after his 1961 film, Gorgo, which he directed in 1959, he would stop directing movies because he did not want to direct "the same comic-strip monsters."

Eight years later, he received an Academy Award nomination for his visual effects on Krakatoa, East of Java. Lourié makes a silent cameo appearance in the film, portraying a lighthouse keeper on the coast of Java in 1883 who observes Krakatoa's final, cataclysmic explosion and enters the lighthouse to send news of it by telegraph.

He also contributed special and visual effects to Flight from Ashiya (1964) and Crack in the World (1965).

=== Return to art department ===
Throughout the 1970s, Lourié worked on TV shows like Kung Fu, The Delphi Bureau, and The Brian Keith Show. His last directorial credit was as a second unit director for the pilot episode of the notoriously-troubled Supertrain.

In 1980, Lourié designed Clint Eastwood's Bronco Billy, his last feature film credit as an art director.

Lourié had a small acting part in Richard Gere's 1983 picture Breathless, a remake of the French New Wave classic of the same name. He also appeared on an episode of Tales of the Unexpected.

== Personal life ==
On 28 December 1940 (Note: Also cited as 1941.), Lourié married Laure Lourié, a French costume designer, in Bormes-les-Mimosas. Lourié was the son-in-law of the Chilean painter Manuel Ortíz de Zárate and the Polish painter Jadwiga Piechowska.

=== Death ===
Lourié died on 26 May 1991 of a stroke while in the Motion Picture and Television Hospital in Woodland Hills, Los Angeles.

== Filmography ==
=== Film ===
Year	Title	Functioned as		Notes	Ref(s)
Year	Title	Director	Writer	Notes	Ref(s)
1953	The Beast from 20,000 Fathoms	Yes	No		
1955	Napoléon	2nd unit	No	Directed some battle scenes	
1956	If Paris Were Told to Us	Assistant	No		
1958	The Colossus of New York	Yes	No		
1958	Revolt in the Big House	No	Yes		
1959	The Giant Behemoth	Yes	Yes	Co-directed with Douglas Hickox; Co-written with Daniel Lewis James	
1961	Gorgo	Yes	Story	Original story by Lourié and Daniel Hyatt	

==== Art department credits ====
Year	Title	Director	Contribution	Notes	Ref(s)
1927	The Chess Player	Raymond Bernard	Costume designer		
1927	Napoléon	Abel Gance	Set decorator		
1929	Cagliostro	Richard Oswald	Costume designer		
1932	A Telephone Call	Georges Lacombe	Set designer		
1932	Pan!... Pan!...	Georges Lacombe	Set designer	Short film	
1934	Jeanne	Georges Marret	Art and costume designer		
1934	The Bread Peddler	René Sti	Set designer		
1934	Madame Bovary	Jean Renoir	Art director		
1934	Le Bossu	René Sti	Set designer		
1935	Dark Eyes	Victor Tourjansky	Set designer		
1935	The Squadron's Baby	René Sti	Set designer		
1935	Baccara	Yves Mirande	Set designer		
1935	La Petite Sauvage		Set designer		
1936	The Great Refrain	Yves Mirande; Robert Siodmak	Art director		
1936	The Lower Depths	Jean Renoir	Art director		
1936	Under Western Eyes	Marc Allégret	Set designer		
1936	Adventure in Paris	Marc Allégret	Set designer		
1937	La Grande Illusion	Jean Renoir	Art director		
1937	The Alibi	Pierre Chenal	Set designer		
1937	The Messenger	Raymond Rouleau	Set designer		
1937	Nights of Fire	Marcel L'Herbier	Set designer		
1938	Rasputin	Marcel L'Herbier	Set designer		
1938	The Novel of Werther	Max Ophüls	Art director		
1938	Ramuntcho	René Barberis	Set designer		
1938	The Lafarge Case	Pierre Chenal	Art director		
1938	The New Rich	André Berthomieu	Set designer		
1938	La Bête Humaine	Jean Renoir	Art director		
1938	Le Paradis de Satan		Set designer		
1939	There's No Tomorrow	Max Ophüls	Art director		
1939	The Rules of the Game	Jean Renoir	Art director		
1940	Cristobal's Gold	Jean Stelli; Jacques Becker	Art director		
1940	False Alarm	Jacques de Baroncelli	Set designer		
1943	Sahara	Zoltan Korda	Associate art director		
1943	This Land Is Mine	Jean Renoir	Production designer	Also associate producer	
1943	Three Russian Girls	Fedor Ozep	Art director		
1944	The Impostor	Julien Duvivier	Art director		
1944	The House of Fear	Roy William Neill	Art director		
1944	In Society	Jean Yarbrough	Art director		
1947	The Long Night	Anatole Litvak	Production designer		
1951	Adventures of Captain Fabian	Robert Florey	Set designer		
1951	Limelight	Charlie Chaplin	Art director		
1951	The River	Jean Renoir	Production designer		
1953	The Diamond Queen	John Brahm	Production designer		
1954	So This Is Paris	Richard Quine	Art director		
1962	Confessions of an Opium Eater	Albert Zugsmith	Art director		
1963	Shock Corridor	Samuel Fuller	Art director		
1964	Flight from Ashiya	Michael Anderson	Production designer	Also special effects director	
1964	The Strangler	Burt Topper	Art director		
1964	The Naked Kiss	Samuel Fuller	Art director		
1965	Crack in the World	Andrew Marton	Art director	Also special effects director	
1965	Battle of the Bulge	Ken Annakin	Art director		
1967	Bikini Paradise	Gregg G. Tallas	Art director		
1967	Custer of the West	Robert Siodmak	Art director		
1968	Krakatoa, East of Java	Bernard L. Kowalski	Production designer	Also special effects director	
1969	The Royal Hunt of the Sun	Irving Lerner	Art director		
1971	What's the Matter with Helen?	Curtis Harrington	Art director		
1976	Burnt Offerings	Dan Curtis	Production designer		
1978	An Enemy of the People	George Schaefer	Production designer		
1980	Bronco Billy	Clint Eastwood	Art director		

==== Acting roles ====
Year	Title	Role	Director	Ref(s)
1983	Breathless	Dr. Boudreaux	Jim McBride	

=== Television ===
==== Director ====
Year	Title	Notes	Ref(s)
1954	Cross Current	Episode: "Necklace"	
1955	Foreign Intrigue	8 episodes	
1956	Telephone Time	Episode: "Boarders Away"	
1959	World of Giants	Episode: "Chemical Story"	

==== Art department credits ====
Year	Title	Contribution	Notes	Ref(s)
1949	Your Show Time	Art director	2 episodes	
1952	Invitation Playhouse	Art director	Episode: "Happiness"	
1952-53	Racket Squad	Art director	5 episodes	
1953	My Little Margie	Art director	5 episodes	
1953-54	The Life of Riley	Art director	5 episodes	
1954	Waterfront	Art director	Episode: "The Skipper's Day"	
1971	Death Takes a Holiday	Art director	TV movie	
1972	The Eyes of Charles Sand	Art director	TV movie	
1972	The Delphi Bureau	Art director	Episode: "Pilot"	
1972	Haunts of the Very Rich	Art director	TV movie	
1972-73	The Little People	Art director	5 episodes	
1972-75	Kung Fu	Art director	63 episodes	
1973	Carola	Art director	TV movie	
1973	What Are Best Friends For?	Art director	TV movie	
1976	Time Travelers	Art director	TV movie	
1976	Philemon	Art director	TV movie	
1977	Quark	Art director	Episode: "Quark"	
1978	The Return of Captain Nemo	Art director	Miniseries	
1978	Lacy and the Mississippi Queen	Art director	TV movie	
1978	Lucan	Art director	2 episodes	
1979	Supertrain	Art director: 2nd unit	Episode: "Express to Terror"	
1980	Freebie and the Bean	Art director	Episode: "Pilot"	
1981	A Whale for the Killing	Production design consultant	TV movie	

== Awards and nominations ==
Award	Year	Category	Work	Result	Ref(s)
Academy Awards	1970	Best Special Visual Effects	Krakatoa, East of Java	Nominated	

== See also ==
- Art Directors Guild Hall of Fame
