= Laure Lourié =

French costume designer (1911–2001)

- Born: Laure Mathilde Ortíz de Zárate; 9 August 1911; Montpellier, France
- Died: 13 January 2001 (aged 89); Portland, Oregon, US
- Other names: Laure Ferren; Laure de Zarate
- Occupation: Costume designer
- Years active: 1936–1969
- Spouse(s): John Ferren (m. 1931; div. 1938) Eugène Lourié (m. 1940; died 1991)
- Parents: Manuel Ortíz de Zárate (father); Jadwiga Piechowska (mother)
- Family: Pinto family

Laure Lourié (née Ortíz de Zárate; 9 August 1911 – 13 January 2001) was a French costume designer active in interwar France and postwar Hollywood.

== Biography ==
Laure Mathilde Ortíz de Zárate was born on 9 August 1911 in Montpellier to Manuel Ortíz de Zárate, a Chilean painter, and Jadwiga Piechowska, Polish painter. Lourié was the granddaughter of the composer Eliodoro Ortíz de Zárate (1865–1953), and was a member of the Pinto family through her paternal grandmother. Lourié was the niece of the painter Julio Ortiz de Zárate.

Before entering the film industry Lourié worked as a secretary to Hélène Oettingen.

== Personal life ==
From 1931 to 1938, Lourié was married to John Ferren, an American artist and educator. On 28 December 1940 (Note: Also cited as 1941.), Lourié married Eugène Lourié, a French–Russian filmmaker, in Bormes-les-Mimosas.

On 13 January 2001 Lourié died at her home in Portland, Oregon aged 89.

== Filmography ==
Year	Title	Role	Notes	Ref(s)
1936	Les bas-fonds	Costume designer		
1937	Yoshiwara	Costume designer		
1938	La Bête Humaine	Costume designer		
1939	Sans lendemain	Costume designer		
1940	L'or du Cristobal	Costume designer		
1945	The Song of Bernadette	Technical advisor	Credited as Laure de Zarate	
1947	The Exile	Gowns for Maria Montez	Credited as Laure Lourie	
1950	Cyrano de Bergerac	Technical advisor	Credited as Laure de Zarate. Released 1951	
1953	The Diamond Queen	Costume designer	Credited as Laure de Zarate	
1964	Le journal d'une femme de chambre	Costume designer	Uncredited	
1965	Crack in the World	Costume designer	Credited as Laure de Zarate	
1965	Battle of the Bulge (film)	Costume designer	Credited as Laure de Zarate	
1968	Custer of the West	Costume designer	Credited as Laure de Zarate	
1969	Krakatoa, East of Java	Costume designer	Credited as Laure de Zarate	
