= Dinosaur Tales =

Book by Ray Bradbury

- cover from the first edition
- Author: Ray Bradbury
- Language: English
- Genre: Science fiction
- Publisher: Bantam Books
- Publication date: 1983
- Publication place: United States
- Media type: Print (paperback)
- Pages: 144
- ISBN: 0-553-01484-6
- OCLC: 9524799
- LC Class: PZ7.B717 Di 1983

Dinosaur Tales is a 1983 short story collection by Ray Bradbury. Several of the stories are original to this collection. Other stories were first published in Collier's and The Saturday Evening Post magazines. The collection contains over 60 pages of illustrations by Gahan Wilson, William Stout, Steranko, Moebius, Overton Loyd, Kenneth Smith and David Wiesner.

== Table of contents ==
- Foreword by Ray Harryhausen (1983)
- Introduction by Ray Bradbury (1983)
- "Besides A Dinosaur, Whatta Ya Wanna Be When You Grow Up?" (1983)
- "A Sound of Thunder" (1952)
- "Lo, the Dear, Daft Dinosaurs!" (1980)
- "The Fog Horn" (1951)
- "What If I Said: The Dinosaur's Not Dead?" (1983)
- "Tyrannosaurus Rex" (1962)
- Contributors

== Editions ==
- ISBN 0-553-24614-3 (paperback, 1984) cover by Sanjulián

== The Beast From 20,000 Fathoms ==
The story in this book, known as "The Foghorn," was responsible for the inspiration of the 1953 monster movie "The Beast from 20,000 Fathoms." The film started with a separate working title (The Monster from Beneath the Sea), but producers realized a scene involving a lighthouse-destroying attack closely mirrored Bradbury's story. The studio bought the film rights to Bradbury's story for $2,000 and renamed the movie The Beast from 20,000 Fathoms to use his name for marketing. Bradbury subsequently renamed his original short story to "The Fog Horn" when it was reprinted in anthologies to avoid confusion with the hit film.

== Reception ==
Dave Pringle reviewed Dinosaur Tales for Imagine magazine, and stated that "This book might make an appropriate Christmas present for someone young and simple."

== Reviews ==
- Review by Chris Henderson (1983) in Dragon Magazine, November 1983
- Review by W. Paul Ganley (1983) in Fantasy Mongers 7, 1983
- Review by Andrew Andrews (1984) in Science Fiction Review, Spring 1984
- Review by John DiPrete (1985) in Science Fiction Review, Spring 1985
