= The Fog Horn and Other Stories =

Book by Ray Bradbury

- Author: Ray Bradbury
- Language: English
- Genre: Science fiction, fantasy, horror short stories
- Publisher: Kinseido
- Publication date: 1981
- Publication place: Japan
- Media type: Print (paperback)
- Pages: 48 pp

The Fog Horn and Other Stories is a collection of four short stories by Ray Bradbury. The collection, published in Japan, is published in English for school use.

== Contents ==
- "A Story of Love"
- "The Miracles of Jamie"
- "The Fog Horn"
- "Forever and the Earth"
