= Manuel Ortíz de Zárate =

Chilean painter (1887–1946)

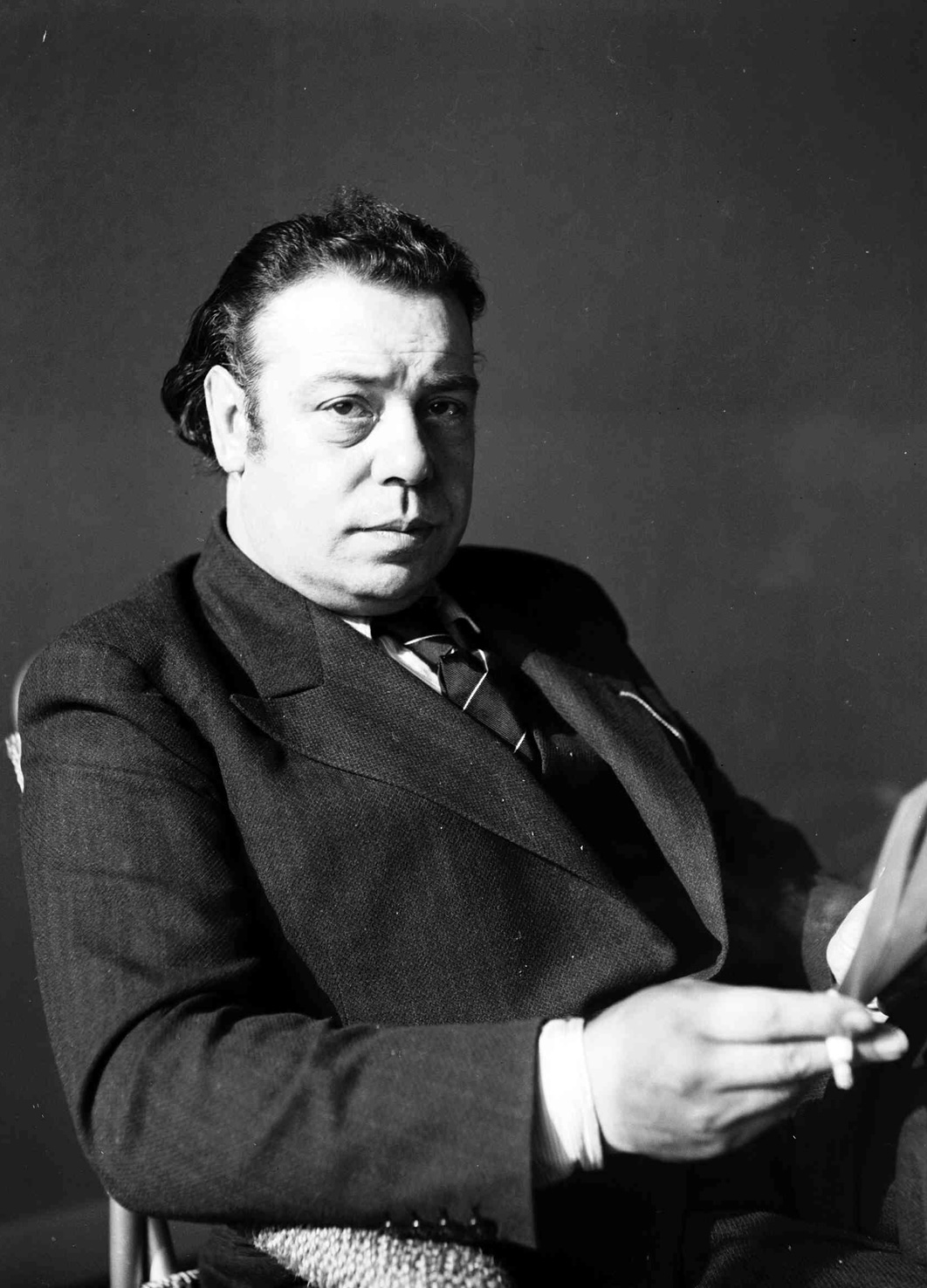
- Ortíz photographed by Karel Kleijn, c. 1935
- Born: Manuel Revuelta Ortíz de Zárate Pinto; 9 October 1887; Como, Kingdom of Italy
- Died: 28 October 1946 (aged 59); Los Angeles, California, US
- Education: École des Beaux-Arts
- Occupation: Painter
- Years active: 1902 to 1945
- Spouse: Jadwiga Piechowska (died 1944)
- Children: 2, including Laure Lourié
- Relatives: Eugène Lourié (son-in-law)
- Family: Pinto family

Manuel Revuelta Ortíz de Zárate Pinto (9 October 1887 – 28 October 1946) was an Italian-born Chilean painter active in France.

== Biography ==
Ortiz was born 9 October 1887 in Como, Kingdom of Italy (present-day, Italy) to Eliodoro Ortíz de Zárate (1865–1953), a composer, and María Cristina Pinto Errázuriz. Through his mother Ortíz was a member of the Pinto family. One of three siblings, Ortíz was the younger brother of painter Julio Ortíz de Zárate.

Ortíz was born whilst his father was studying at the Milan Conservatory. In 1891, aged four, Ortíz's family returned to Chile. He went on to study painting with Pedro Lira, before entering the Escuela de Bellas Artes (Academy of Fine Arts) in Santiago.

At age 15, he fled home and stowed away on a ship to Italy. He studied painting in Rome, before being drawn to the burgeoning art scene in France, he made his way to Paris. There, he became part of the growing gathering of artists in the Montparnasse Quarter, making friends with Amedeo Modigliani, Pablo Picasso, Léonard Foujita, and some of the other future greats of the art world.

Manuel Ortiz de Zárate studied at the École des Beaux-Arts in Paris, developing his modernist skills in the painting of still lifes and landscapes. In 1916, he became Picasso's art assistant. Between 1920 until 1940, Ortiz de Zárate showed his work at the Salon d’Automne, an annual art exhibition in Paris, France. Together with Camilo Mori and other artists from Chile, Manuel Ortiz de Zárate helped found the Grupo Montparnasse. During World War II, he remained in France despite the German occupation. After the war, he went to the United States where he died in 1946 in Los Angeles, California.

== Personal life ==
Ortíz was married to the Polish painter Jadwiga Piechowska, whom he meet whilst she was studying in Florence. Ortíz and Piechowska had two children, including the costume designer Laure Lourié (née Ortiz de Zárate). Ortíz was the father-in-law of Eugène Lourié, and the former father-in-law of John Ferren.
