= The Fog Horn =

1951 short story written by Ray Bradbury

- Short story by Ray Bradbury
- Language: English
- Genre: Science fiction

Publication
- Published in: The Saturday Evening Post
- Publication type: Periodical
- Publication date: June 23, 1951

"The Fog Horn" is a 1951 science fiction short story by American writer Ray Bradbury, the first in his collection The Golden Apples of the Sun. The story was the basis for the 1953 monster film The Beast from 20,000 Fathoms.

== Plot summary ==
Johnny, the protagonist and narrator, and his boss, McDunn, are relaxing after a day's work at a remote lighthouse in late November. The lighthouse's resonating fog horn attracts a sea monster. This is in fact the third time the monster has visited the lighthouse: it has been attracted by the same fog horn on the same night for the last two years. McDunn attributes the monster's actions to feelings of unrequited love for the lighthouse, whose fog horn sounds exactly like the wailings of the sea monster itself. The fog horn tricks the monster into thinking it has found another of its kind, one who acts as though the monster did not even exist. McDunn and Johnny turn off the fog horn, and in a rage, the monster destroys the lighthouse before retreating to the sea. Later, the lighthouse is reconstructed with reinforced concrete and Johnny finds a new job away from the lighthouse. A year later, Johnny returns. McDunn is still the light master but the monster never returns. McDunn hypothesizes that the monster will continue to wait in the depths of the world.

== Background ==
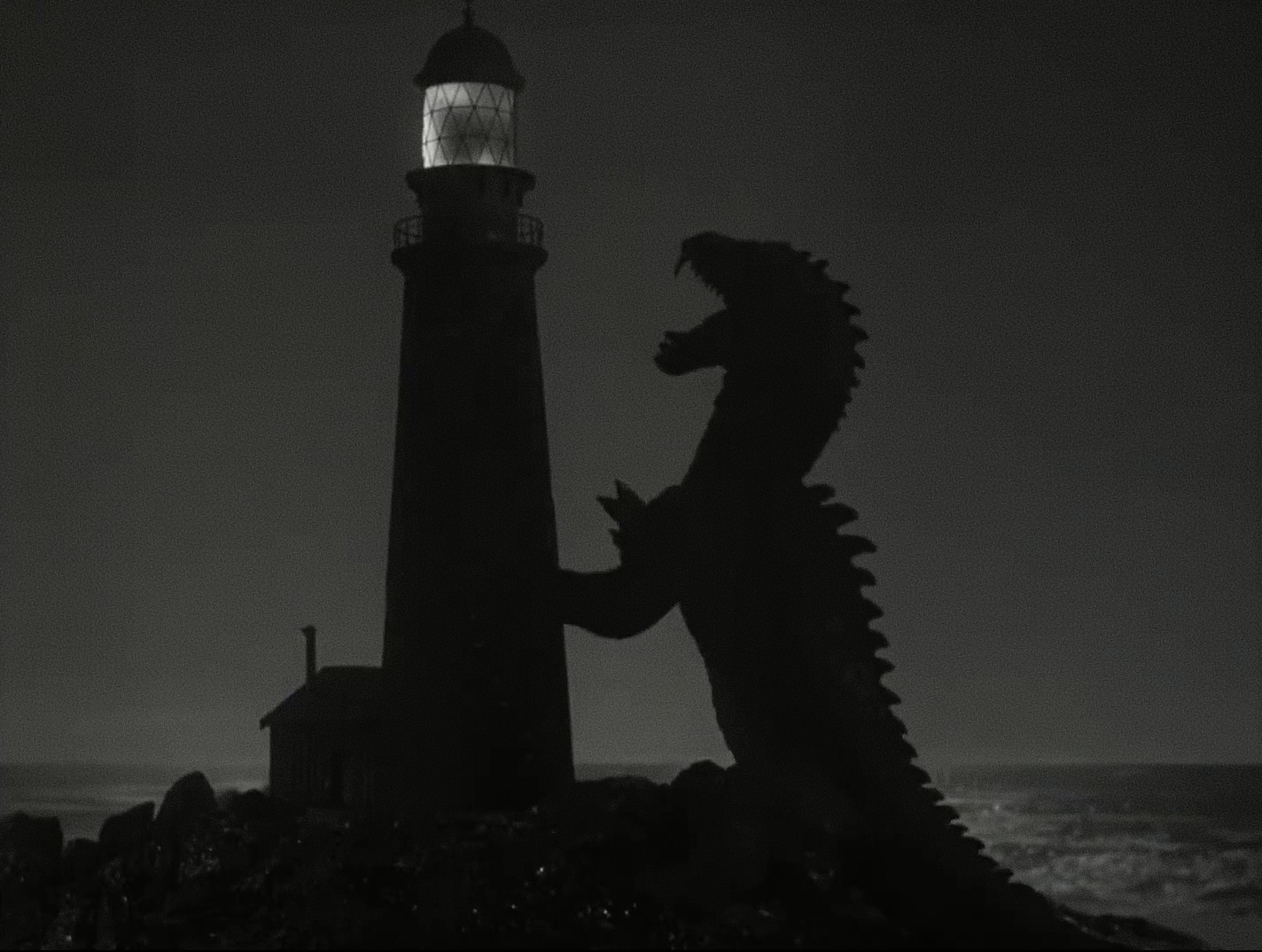
Scene from The Beast from 20,000 Fathoms

The original title of the story was "The Beast from 20,000 Fathoms". It was published in The Saturday Evening Post. Meanwhile, a film with a similar theme of prehistoric sea monster was being shot under the working title of Monster from Beneath the Sea. Later the producers, who wished to capitalize on Bradbury's reputation and popularity, bought the rights to Bradbury's story and changed their film's title. Bradbury then changed the title of his story to "The Fog Horn". The monster of the film was based on the illustration of The Saturday Evening Post.

Bradbury says that the idea for the story came from seeing the ruins of a demolished roller coaster on a Los Angeles-area beach. The tracks suggested a dinosaur skeleton. He credits this story with earning him the attention of John Huston, who engaged Bradbury to write the screenplay for the 1956 film version of Moby Dick.

The story was reprinted in various collections including the 1953 publication The Golden Apples of the Sun, the Japanese publications The Fog Horn & Other Stories in 1979 and The Fog Horn and Other Stories in 1981 (both editions were published in English also), and finally Dinosaur Tales in 1983.

== Adaptations ==
The story was the basis for the 1953 action horror film The Beast from 20,000 Fathoms.

A play based on the short story was included in Bradbury's Pillar of Fire and Other Plays in 1975.

The plot in the thirteenth episode of Pokémon, "Mystery at the Lighthouse" (1997), is based on this short story.

Leonard Nimoy stated that this story was part of the inspiration behind the 1986 film Star Trek IV: The Voyage Home.

In 1953 in the comic book Tales of Horror #7 an uncredited version of this story is presented as "The Beast From the Deep". An official comic adaptation was produced in 1993 in Topps Comics' Ray Bradbury Comics #3.

The 2020 crowdfunded Japanese short film Howl from Beyond the Fog was inspired by the story, with director Daisuke Sato having previously adapted the story as a 20-minute short fan-film in 2007 as a technical exercise.

The influence of the short story contributed to the creation of the Godzilla franchise.
