= Daniel Lewis James =

American writer

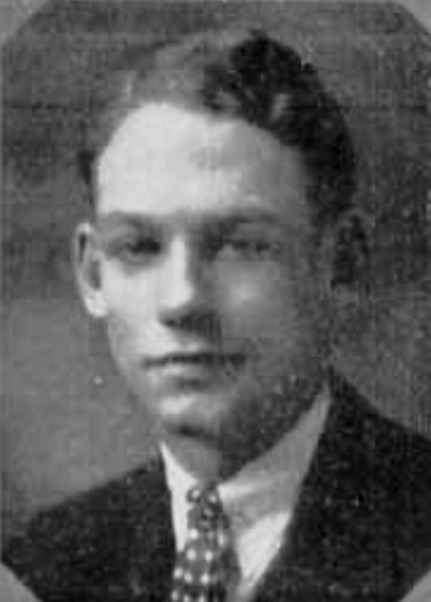
- Daniel Lewis James, c. 1928
- Born: Daniel Lewis James, Jr. January 14, 1911; Kansas City, Missouri, US
- Died: May 18, 1988 (aged 77); Carmel-by-the-Sea, California, US
- Occupation: writer
- Spouses: Rosalie Guignon (m. 1934; div. 1940) Lilith (m. 1940)
- Children: 2

Daniel Lewis James Jr. (January 14, 1911 – May 18, 1988) was an American writer, best known for his novel Famous All Over Town, about Mexican-Americans in Los Angeles. He published the novel under his pseudonym, Danny Santiago, and during most of his professional career, he kept his identity a secret. James's own agent, Carl Brandt, did not know his real name until it was revealed by fellow author and friend John Gregory Dunne. Some critics call this use of a Latino pseudonym a literary fraud, while others appreciate his contributions to literature, regardless of his race. Although he was white, some critics believed he was able to convey an accurate portrait of the Chicano culture.

== Early life ==
James was born on January 14, 1911, the son of a wealthy Kansas City businessman Daniel Lewis "D. L." James Sr, (1880–1944) and Mother Lillie Hyatt Snider (1883–1968). His father wrote plays, some of which were staged off Broadway in New York. James grew up in Kansas City, Missouri and graduated from Phillips Academy in 1928, and Yale in 1933. At Yale, he majored in Classical Greek and was the only one to do so from the Yale Class of 1933.

James married his first wife, Rosalie Guignon (1914–2000), on December 16, 1934, in Jackson, Missouri. In 1940, he divorced his wife, moved to Los Angeles, California and married Lilith (Lily) Stanward (1914–1999).

=== Seaward ===
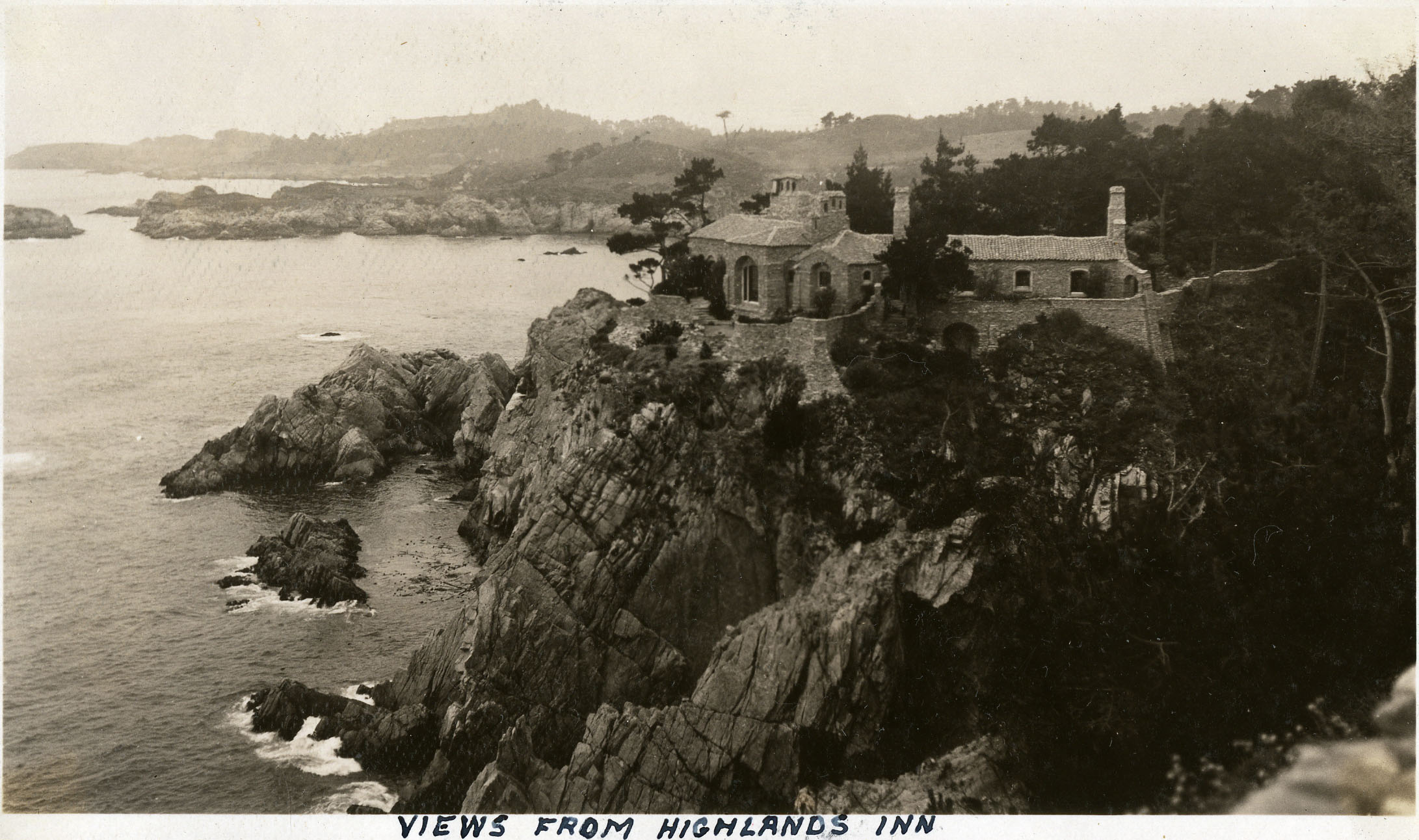
Seaward, the Carmel Highlands home of D. L. James

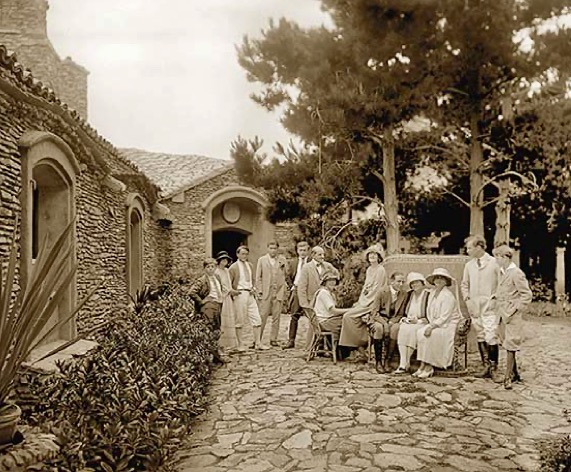
The James family at Seaward.

His family came to Carmel-by-the-Sea, California in 1916. In 1918, his father purchased property in Carmel Highlands, California, and hired the firm Greene and Greene to build a sandstone and granite Mediterranean-style house on a bluff overlooking the Pacific Ocean. The design of the house was based on Tintagel Castle in North Cornwall, England. It has arched windows and a red tile roof. The main house has three bedrooms and four bathrooms. There is a one-bedroom caretaker's cottage that was built in 1940. Greene supervised the construction of the granite house that took five years to complete. The house was later called "Seaward" and was a summer retreat for the family for 20 years.

When his father died in 1944, his wife Lily moved to Seaward. She supported many of the local groups, including the Carmel Bach Festival.

In 2022, actor Brad Pitt purchased Seaward for $40 million.

== Career ==
After completing college in 1933, James moved back to the Seaward house full-time. While in Carmel, he was active in the local theater groups and performed with the Carmel Players. In 1938, James directed Chekhov's comedy The Boor. His wife Rosalie had the lead role.

James met filmmaker Charlie Chaplin at Seaward. The two became friends with John Steinbeck at the time he was working on The Grapes of Wrath at his home in Los Gatos, California. James moved back to Hollywood and was an assistant director on the movie The Great Dictator with Charlie Chaplin in 1940. It was his business association with Chaplin, as well as his time in Hollywood, that brought him to the attention of the House Un-American Activities Committee. Both he and his wife Lilith were called to testify and refused to self-incriminate, citing their Fifth Amendment rights.

In 1942, James released Winter Soldiers, a play presented at the New School of Social Research, on the efforts of the underground to impede the Nazi advance toward Moscow during World War II.

He and his second wife, Lilith, wrote the book for Bloomer Girl, a successful 1944 Broadway musical. It had 654 performances and traveled across state. Then he kept out of sight as an author for some time. For the next twenty years, he and his wife worked as volunteers in Hispanic neighborhoods in East Los Angeles.

In 1959 he used the pseudonym Daniel Hyatt (Hyatt was his grandmother's maiden name) when he worked on the script for Revolt in the Big House in 1958. When the film was released, Eugène Lourié received a co-credit. Lourié would later say that James helped him write the script for The Giant Behemoth which was released in 1959, and the pair wrote the script for Gorgo, released in 1961. When the Writers Guild of America corrected the attribution of writers affected by the Hollywood blacklist in 1986, James was credited as co-writer of The Giant Behemoth. Because of their work together on The Giant Behemoth and Gorgo, it has been assumed that James was the co-writer of The Beast from 20,000 Fathoms that Lourié spoke of but would not name in interviews, despite his willingness to speak openly about his association with James on other projects.

He gained notice under the pseudonym "Danny Santiago" after the publication of "The Somebody" in Redbook in 1970. In order to keep his identity a secret, he kept in contact with his New York agent through a post office box in Pacific Grove, California. According to interviews, James apparently "lost confidence in [his] writing ability" after being blacklisted and used the name as a way to circumvent the blacklist.

The Jameses rented their Hollywood house to writer John Gregory Dunne and his wife, Joan Didion, for several years beginning in 1966. They soon became good friends. Dunne disliked pseudonyms, and he encouraged James to write under his own name. James's real identity came to light when Dunne wrote an article for the August 16, 1984, issue of The New York Review of Books.

After his mother died in 1968, James inherited Seaward, where he and his wife had returned to live. He published the novel Famous All Over Town in 1983. In 1984, he was awarded the Rosenthal Award for Literary Achievement, with a prize of $5,000, awarded by the American Academy and Institute of Arts and Letters for his novel, but he did not show up to accept it. His publisher, Simon & Schuster, wanted to submit the novel for the Pulitzer Prize, but James refused to supply personal information.

== Death ==
James died on May 18, 1988, at the Community Hospital of the Monterey Peninsula in Monterey, California, at the age of 77, after having a heart attack at his Seaward home. He was survived by his two daughters, two granddaughters, and two great-granddaughters. His wife continued to live at Seaward for another ten years.

== Controversy ==
Famous All Over Town was published in 1983. It tells the story of a Mexican-American family in East Los Angeles, California. It was initially considered a "highly regarded contribution to Chicano literature". The book was recognized and awarded as an outstanding work of fiction. Hispanic youths found the novel inspiring and considered the main character a role model; they believed in the author, Danny Santiago, as a man who had endured situations like their own and had written a best seller.

The book became controversial when an article in The New York Review of Books revealed that the author was Daniel Lewis James from Kansas City, Missouri, and not a Mexican-American named Danny Santiago who was writing from his personal experience growing up Hispanic in Los Angeles, as his readers believed. It is now debated whether the novel can be taken as a straightforward document of the Hispanic experience.

== Reasons for pseudonyms ==
For two decades, James wrote screenplays as "Daniel Hyatt", and he began using the name "Daniel Santiago" in 1965. James took a pseudonym because "he had been blacklisted after he was identified before the House Committee on Un-American Activities in 1951 as having been a member of the Communist Party."

His friends had advised him not to use a pseudonym that implied a different ethnicity, but he argued that use of a pseudonym was well understood—Mark Twain and other authors did it—and no harm would come from it. A few of his fellow writers remarked that the pseudonym would not matter if the book was good. His new name was both defended and denounced by Hispanic-American writers.

Laura Browder suggests that Danny Santiago was an alter ego through which James was able to forge a new, strong public identity and to avenge himself against the repressive America that had wrecked his life.

== Opinions ==
Views differed on the significance of his novel after his public learned that Santiago was not Hispanic. Some who had been inspired by the book became hostile. They believed that, because he was not actually Hispanic, his work no longer mattered since it "can no longer be taken as a straightforward document of the Hispanic experience".

Others had a different perspective. "There is some suggestion that James felt himself to be so close to the members of the Hispanic community that he felt that he could speak from their vantage point". The review in The New York Times described Famous All Over Town as "an honest, steady novel that presents some hard cultural realities".
