= Revolt in the Big House =

1958 film by R. G. Springsteen

- Theatrical release poster
- Directed by: R. G. Springsteen
- Screenplay by: Daniel Lewis James (as Daniel Hyatt); Eugene Lourie
- Produced by: David Diamond
- Starring: Gene Evans; Robert Blake; Timothy Carey
- Cinematography: William Margulies
- Edited by: William Austin
- Distributed by: Allied Artists Pictures
- Release date: November 21, 1958
- Running time: 79 minutes
- Country: United States
- Language: English

Revolt in the Big House is a 1958 American film noir directed by R. G. Springsteen and starring Gene Evans, Robert Blake and Timothy Carey.

Portions of the film were shot on location at Folsom State Prison in California.

Blacklisted screenwriter Daniel Lewis James was listed in the onscreen credits as Daniel Hyatt. In 1998 his credit was reinstated under his real name as the film's cowriter by the Writers Guild of America.

== Cast ==
- Gene Evans as Lou Gannon
- Robert Blake as Rudy Hernandez
- Timothy Carey as Ed 'Bugsy' Kyle
- John Qualen as Doc
- Sam Edwards as Al Carey
- John Dennis as Red
- Walter Barnes as Guard Capt. Starkey
- Frank Richards as Jake
- Emile Meyer as Warden
- Arline Hunter as Girl (as Arlene Hunter)
