= Jack Dietz =

American film producer

Jack Dietz (1901 – 30 January 1969) was an American film producer, notable for his collaboration with Sam Katzman at Monogram Studios. At one stage he operated The Cotton Club in Harlem.

In the late 1930s he produced movies of heavyweight fights. In 1943 he was sentenced to seven months jail for evading taxes of $200,237 in 1936 and 1937, money earned from distributing fight films. In 1951 he helped set up Mutual Productions.

He died while undergoing open heart surgery.

== Select filmography ==
- The Ape Man (1943)
- Ghosts on the Loose (1943)
- The Beast from 20,000 Fathoms (1953)
- The Black Scorpion (1957)
- Hannibal (1959)
