= Monster movie =

Film genre

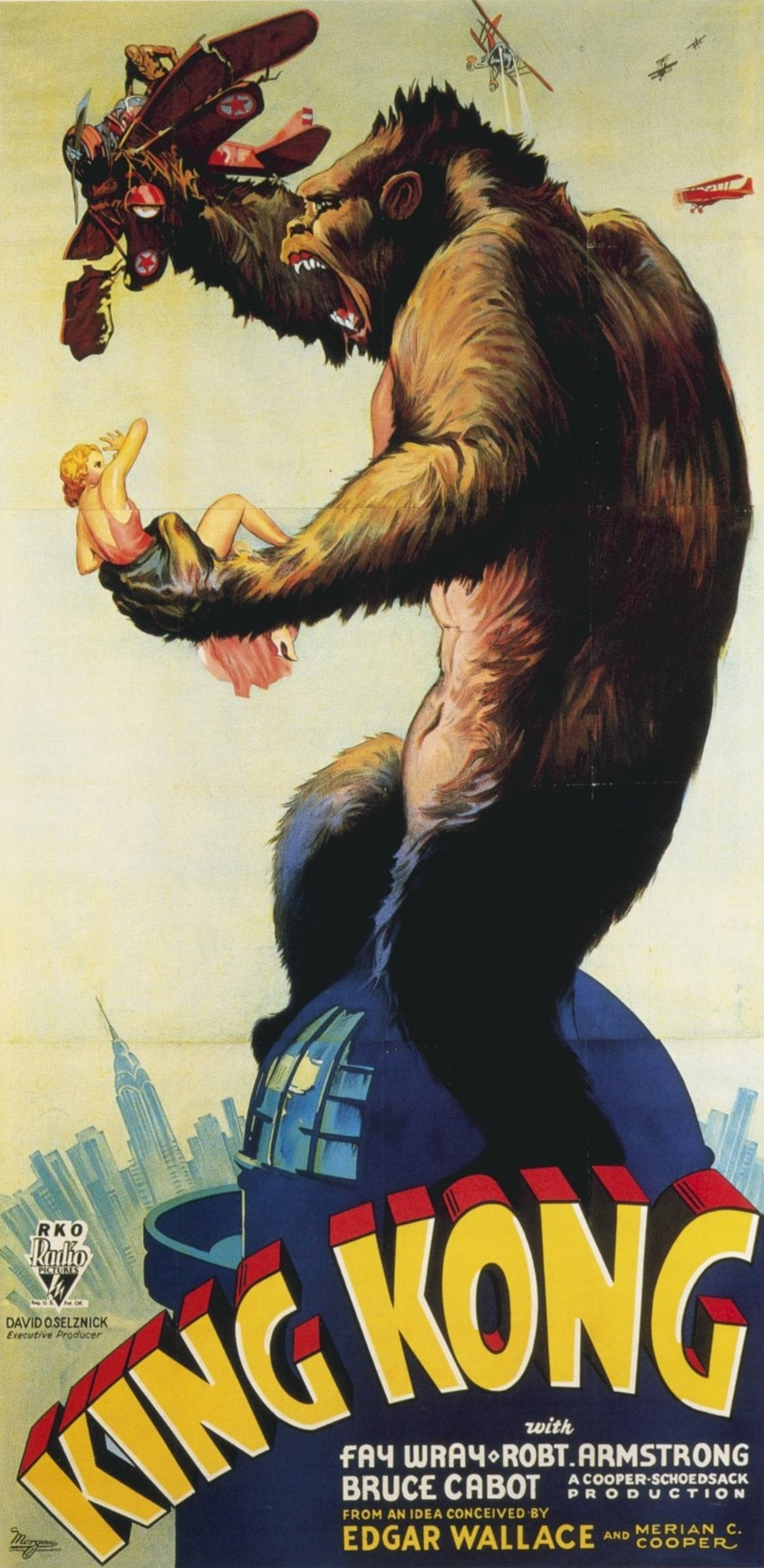
Theatrical release poster for King Kong (1933)

A monster movie, monster film, or creature feature is a film that focuses on one or more characters struggling to survive attacks by one or more antagonistic monsters. Such may be man-sized, like the Creature from the Black Lagoon, or abnormally large ones, like King Kong or Godzilla. The film may also fall under the horror, comedy, fantasy, or science fiction genres. Monster movies originated with adaptations of horror folklore and literature.

== Traditional concepts ==
The most common aspect of a monster movie is the struggle between a human collective of protagonists against one or more monsters, who often serve as the antagonistic force. In Japanese cinema, giant monsters known as kaiju often take up this role.

The monster is often created by a folly of mankind – an experiment gone wrong, the effects of radiation or the destruction of habitat. Or the monster is from outer space, has been on Earth for a long time with no one ever seeing it, or released (or awakened) from a prison of some sort where it was being held.

The monster is usually a villain, but can be a metaphor of humankind's continuous destruction; giant monsters since the introduction of The Beast from 20,000 Fathoms (1953) have for a time been considered a symbol of atomic warfare, for instance. On the contrary, Godzilla began in this fashion yet as time moved on his reputation quickly grew into that of a cultural icon to the Japanese, as much as Superman is a cultural symbol to America, with a number of films presenting Godzilla as a sort of protagonist who helps protect humans from other, more malevolent monsters.

The attempts of the humans to destroy the monster would at first be the usage of an opposing military force – an attempt that would antagonize the monster even more and prove useless (a cliché associated with the genre). The Godzilla series utilized the concept of a superweapon built by Japanese scientists to suppress him or any of the monsters he fights.

Historically, monsters have been depicted using stop motion animation, puppets, or creature suits. In the modern day, many monster movies have used CGI monsters.

== History ==
=== Early monster films (1915–1954) ===
The Pet (1921) is likely the earliest "giant monster attacking a city" film.

The first feature-length films to include what are regarded as monsters were often classed as horror or science fiction films. The lost 1915 German silent film The Golem, directed by Paul Wegener, is one of the earliest examples of film to include a creature. Wegener released a sequel in 1920 entitled The Golem: How He Came into the World, which is one of the earliest extant feature films within this category. This was followed in 1921 by the Italian science fiction film The Mechanical Man, directed by André Deed. The fragment that exists of this film features an early example of a giant monster battle, in this case involving large humanoid robots. The German Expressionist Nosferatu in 1922, and the depiction of a dragon in Fritz Lang's Die Nibelungen in 1924, followed tradition. In the 1930s, American film studios began to produce more successful films of this type, usually based on Gothic tales such as Dracula and Frankenstein in 1931, both heavily influenced by German Expressionism, followed by The Mummy (1932) and The Invisible Man (1933). Classified as horror films, they included iconic monsters.

Special effects animator Willis O'Brien worked on the 1925 fantasy adventure The Lost World, based on the novel of the same name. The book and film featured dinosaurs, the basis for many future movies. He began work on a similar film known as Creation in 1931, but the project was never completed. Two years later, O'Brien produced special effects for the 1933 RKO film King Kong, directed by Merian C. Cooper. Since then, King Kong has not only become one of the most famous examples of a monster movie, but also is considered a landmark film in the history of cinema. The monster King Kong became a cultural icon, being featured in many other films and media since then.

King Kong went on to inspire many other films of its genre and aspiring animators. A notable example was Ray Harryhausen, who would work with Willis O'Brien on Mighty Joe Young in 1949. Following the re-release of King Kong in 1952, Harryhausen would later work on The Beast from 20,000 Fathoms in 1953. The film was about a fictional dinosaur, a Rhedosaurus, that was awakened from frozen ice in the Arctic Circle by an atomic bomb test. It is considered to be the film which kick-started the 1950s wave of "creature features" and the concept of combining nuclear paranoia with the genre. Such films at the time included Creature from the Black Lagoon (1954), Them! (1954), It Came from Beneath the Sea (1955), Tarantula! (1955), The Deadly Mantis (1957) and 20 Million Miles to Earth (1957). The Giant Behemoth (1959) was an unacknowledged remake of The Beast from 20,000 Fathoms.

=== Kaiju era (1954–1975) ===
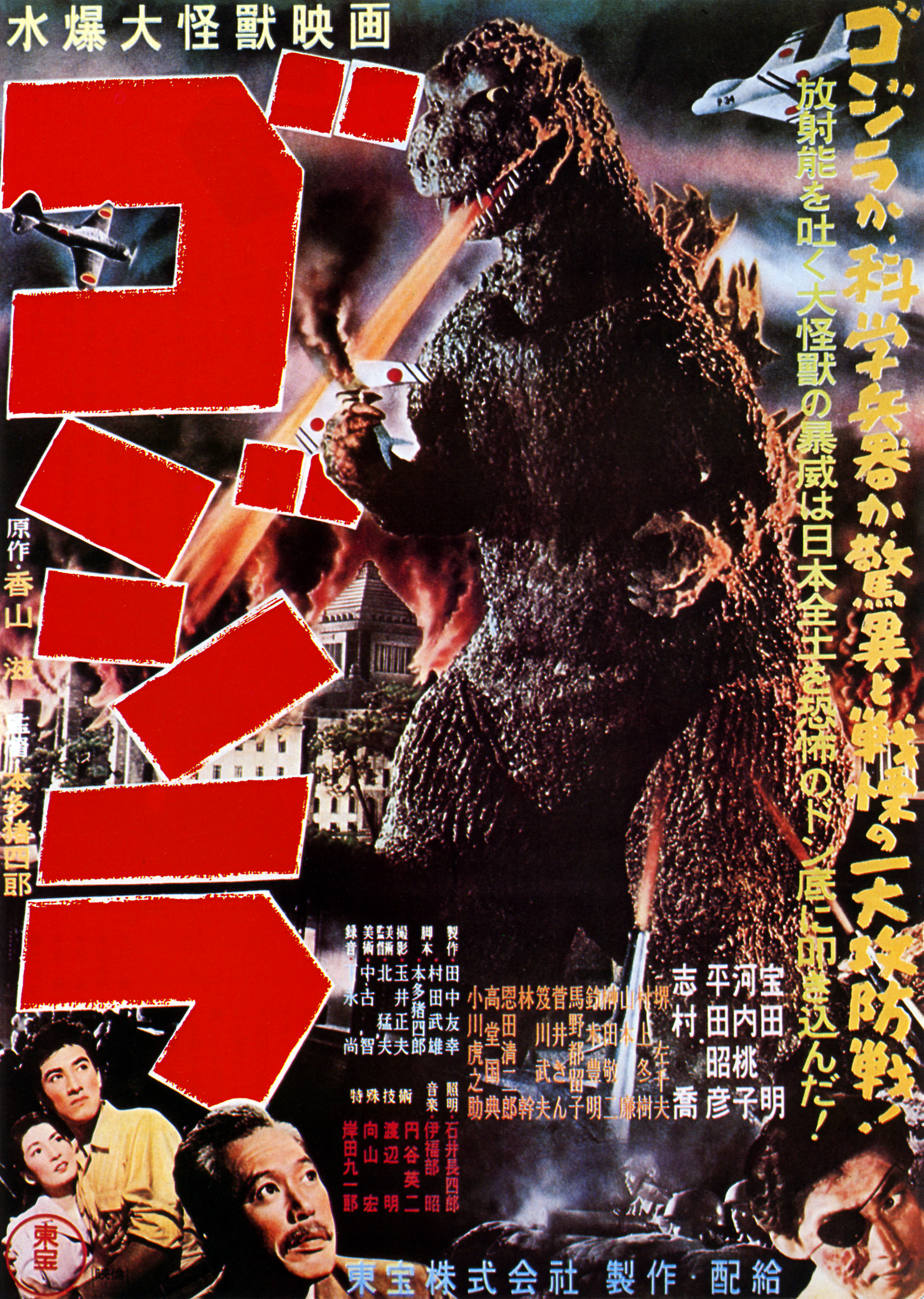
Theatrical poster for Godzilla (1954)

During the 1950s, Japanese film studio Toho produced their first successful kaiju films. Their first successful kaiju film was Godzilla (1954), which adapted the nuclear concept from The Beast from 20,000 Fathoms from a Japanese perspective, rooted in real-life Japanese historical events, such as the atomic bombings of Hiroshima and Nagasaki in 1945 and the Daigo Fukuryū Maru incident in 1954. The film's success spawned the Godzilla franchise, the longest-running film franchise in history. The titular monster has become a cultural icon, and one of the most recognizable monsters in cinema history. It also inspired a wave of kaiju films, such as Rodan from this time.

Godzilla, King of the Monsters! (1956), a re-edited Americanized version of Godzilla for the North American market, notably inspired Steven Spielberg when he was a youth. He described Godzilla as "the most masterful of all the dinosaur movies" because "it made you believe it was really happening."

A parallel development during this era was the rise of the Z movie, films made outside the organized motion picture industry with ultra-low budgets. Grade-Z monster movies such as Plan 9 from Outer Space (1959) and The Creeping Terror (1964) are often listed among the worst films ever made because of their inept acting and amateurish special effects.

After 1960, American monster movies were less popular, yet were still produced. However, Japanese kaiju films were popular during this decade. In 1962, King Kong vs. Godzilla was a kaiju film produced by Toho featuring both Godzilla and King Kong. In 1965, Japanese studio Daiei Film started their own kaiju franchise to rival that of Godzilla, in the form of Gamera.

Ray Harryhausen continued to work on a number of films such as The Valley of Gwangi (1969), while Toho continued production of Godzilla and other kaiju films like Mothra (1961).

The Monster Times film magazine was founded in 1972. In 1973, The Monster Times conducted a poll to determine the most popular screen monster. Godzilla was voted the most popular movie monster, beating Count Dracula, King Kong, the Wolf Man, the Mummy, the Creature from the Black Lagoon, and Frankenstein's monster. By the 1980s, the Godzilla films had grossed $500,000,000 (equivalent to $2,000,000,000 in 2025) at the worldwide box office.

=== Spielberg era (1975–1998) ===
In 1975, Steven Spielberg directed Jaws, which while labeled as a "thriller", features a large, animatronic great white shark. Jaws was an aquatic monster movie influenced by earlier monster films such as King Kong and Godzilla. Jaws is one of the few monster movies based on a real incident: the New Jersey shark-attacks of 1916 (from which Peter Benchley got the idea for the story). Director John Guillermin remade King Kong in 1976. The xenomorph alien had its first appearance in the 1979 science-fiction/horror film Alien, directed by Ridley Scott. That was the same year when magazine Fangoria started being published, in response to the popularity of this genre.

Since the mid-1970s, with Mel Brooks' Young Frankenstein, and into the 1980s, monster movies like Larry Cohen's Q, the Winged Serpent (1982), Tom Holland's Fright Night (1985), George A. Romero's Creepshow (1982) and Ron Underwood's Tremors (1990) used comedy as a scaring device. Prior to the widespread use of computer-generated imagery (CGI), practical special effects (SFX) were utilized in the industry by artists such as Rick Baker, Stan Winston and Rob Bottin.

1993 saw the release of Jurassic Park, based on the 1990 novel of the same name by Michael Crichton and directed by Steven Spielberg, which set a new benchmark in the genre with innovative use of CGI and tried-and-tested animatronics to recreate dinosaurs. The film was also influenced by Godzilla. Jurassic Park was an enormous critical and commercial success and at one point held the title of the highest-grossing film of all time.

The success of Jurassic Park and its six sequels, The Lost World: Jurassic Park (1997), Jurassic Park III (2001), Jurassic World (2015), Jurassic World: Fallen Kingdom (2018), Jurassic World Dominion (2022), and Jurassic World Rebirth (2025), made sure that dinosaurs like Tyrannosaurus rex and the Velociraptor established themselves in the public psyche. The movies also helped generate renewed interest in paleontology. While the films showed allegedly authentic dinosaurs which had been recreated by genetic engineering and could be understood as science fiction, advanced contemporary animation technology made it also possible to revive medieval legends about dragons. The successful feature film Dragonheart (1996) showed a friendly dragon voiced by Sean Connery.

=== Modern era (1998–present) ===
Traditional monster movies re-emerged to a wider audience during the late 1990s. An American remake of Godzilla was made in 1998. The Godzilla featured in that film was considerably different from the original and many Godzilla fans disliked it. In 2002, a French monster film Brotherhood of the Wolf (2001) became the second-highest-grossing French-language film in the United States in the last two decades. In 2004, Godzilla was temporarily retired following Godzilla: Final Wars. Filmmaker Peter Jackson, inspired by the original King Kong and Ray Harryhausen films, remade King Kong in 2005, to critical and commercial success. In 2006, a South Korean monster film, The Host, involved more political overtones than most of its genre.

The 2008 monster movie, Cloverfield, a story in the vein of classic monster movies, focuses entirely on the perspective and reactions of the human cast and is regarded by some as a look at terrorism and the September 11 attacks metaphorically. The following year The Water Horse: Legend of the Deep (2007) was released, in which the legendary Loch Ness Monster is portrayed as a playful creature menaced by overly aggressive humans. The British Independent Film Award-winning film Monsters, in a manner similar to Cloverfield, presented the story of a monster epidemic from the perspective of the humans affected by it. Although not entirely focused on monsters, blockbusters such as The Avengers and Prometheus included scenes that featured monsters posing threats to the protagonists.

In 2013, Warner Bros. and Legendary Pictures released the Guillermo del Toro film Pacific Rim. Though the film was heavily inspired by the kaiju and Mecha anime genres, del Toro wished to create something original with the film rather than to reference previous work. The film was a moderate success in the United States but a box office hit overseas. It received generally positive reviews with significant praise for the film's special effects. A sequel, Pacific Rim Uprising, was released in 2018.

In 2014, Warner Bros. and Legendary Pictures released Godzilla, a reboot of the Godzilla franchise directed by Gareth Edwards. Legendary originally intended to produce a trilogy with Edwards attached to direct all films. Shortly afterwards, Legendary announced a shared cinematic universe between Godzilla and King Kong, titled MonsterVerse. Two years later in 2016, Toho rebooted the Godzilla franchise with Shin Godzilla. Kong: Skull Island was released in March 2017, a reboot of the King Kong franchise and second film in Legendary's MonsterVerse. The third film in the MonsterVerse, Godzilla: King of the Monsters was released on May 31, 2019. Michael Dougherty directed the film and featured Rodan, Mothra, and King Ghidorah. The fourth film in the MonsterVerse, Godzilla vs. Kong, directed by Adam Wingard and featured Mechagodzilla, was released on March 31, 2021.

Godzilla Minus One, directed by Takashi Yamazaki and released in 2023, became the first Godzilla film to win an Academy Award, which it won in the Best Visual Effects category. Its sequel Godzilla Minus Zero, released in 2026, set the record for the highest-grossing opening by a foreign live-action film in North America.

The fifth film in the Monsterverse, Godzilla x Kong: The New Empire was released on March 29, 2024 and again was directed by Adam Wingard. The sixth film in the Monsterverse, Godzilla x Kong: Supernova, is slated for March 26, 2027.

== See also ==
- B movie
- List of monster movies
- List of natural horror films
- List of films featuring giant monsters
- Kaiju
- Zombie film
