= The Giant Behemoth =

1959 British-American film by Eugène Lourié

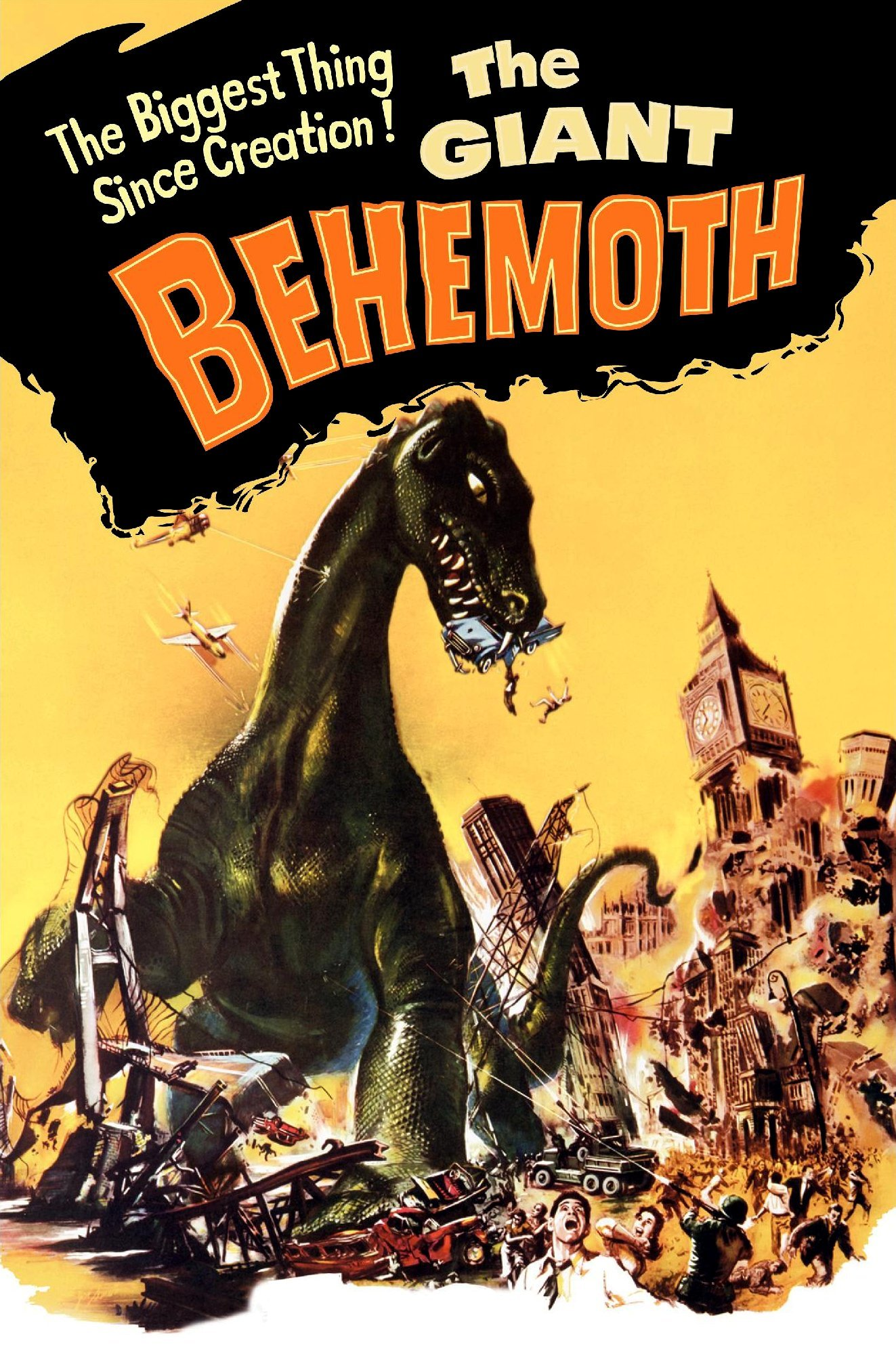
- Theatrical release poster
- Directed by: Eugène Lourié; Douglas Hickox
- Screenplay by: Daniel Lewis James; Eugene Lourie
- Story by: Robert Abel; Allen Adler
- Produced by: Ted Lloyd
- Starring: Gene Evans; André Morell
- Cinematography: Ken Hodges
- Edited by: Lee Doig
- Music by: Edwin Astley
- Production companies: Artistes Alliance, Ltd.
- Distributed by: Allied Artists (United States); Eros Films (United Kingdom)
- Release date: 3 March 1959 (U.S.)
- Running time: 71 minutes (U.K.); 80 minutes (U.S.)
- Countries: United Kingdom; United States
- Language: English
- Budget: $750,000

The Giant Behemoth (originally titled Behemoth the Sea Monster) is a 1959 monster film directed by Eugène Lourié and Douglas Hickox, with special effects by Willis H. O'Brien, Pete Peterson, Irving Block, Jack Rabin, and Louis de Witt. The film stars Gene Evans and André Morell. The screenplay was written by blacklisted author Daniel Lewis James (under the name "Daniel Hyatt") with director Lourié.

Originally a story about an amorphous blob of radiation, the script was changed at the distributor's insistence to a style similar to The Beast from 20,000 Fathoms (1953), though elements of the original concept remain in the early parts of the film and in the "nuclear-breathing" power of the titular monster.

== Plot ==
Scientist Steve Karnes delivers a speech to a British scientific society, led by Professor James Bickford, about the dangers to marine life posed by nuclear testing. Before Karnes can return to the United States, a real-life example of his concern materialises when a fisherman in Looe, Cornwall is killed on the beach, and his dying word is "behemoth". Later, thousands of dead fish are washed ashore.

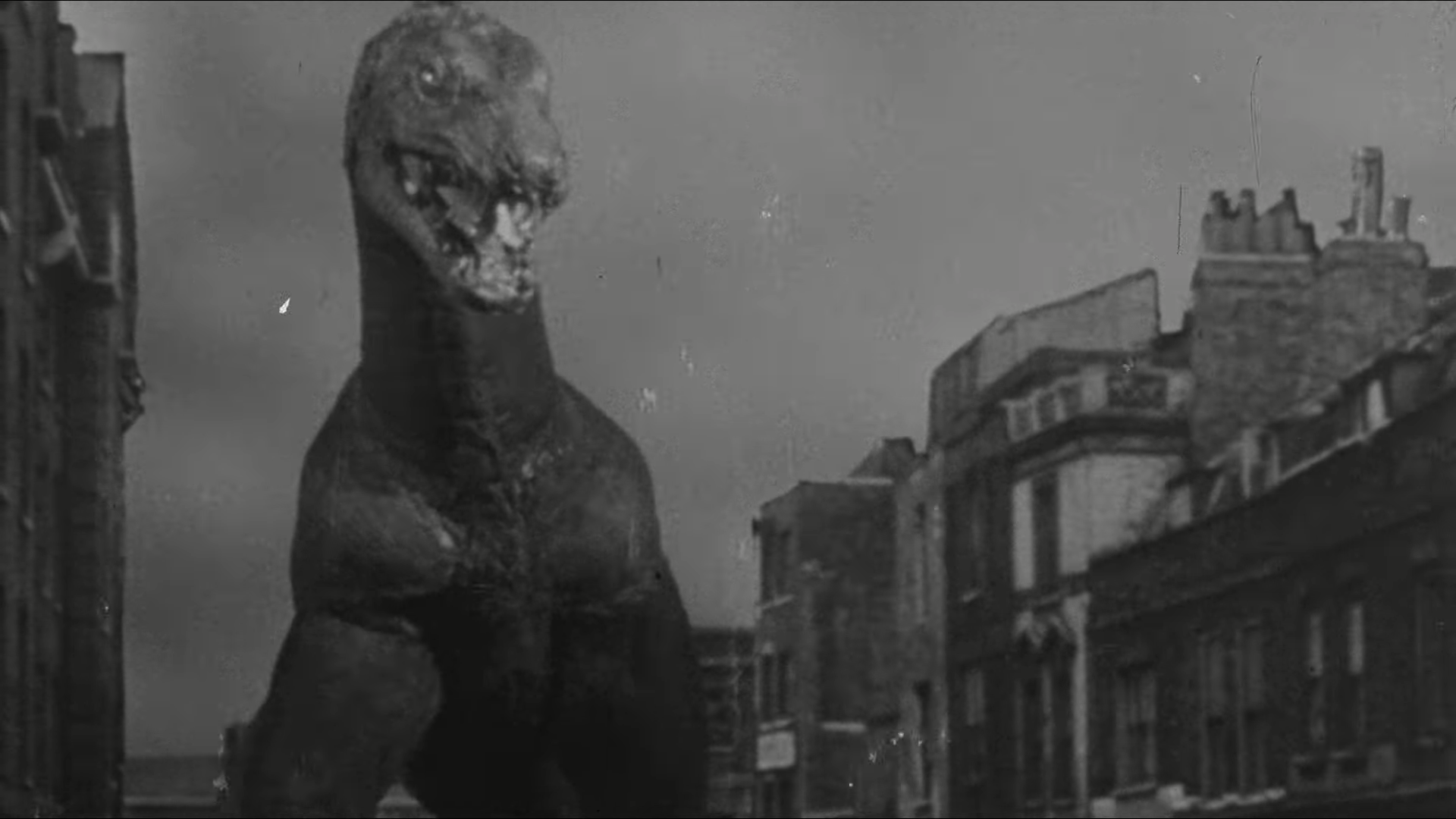
The Paleosaurus

Karnes and Bickford travel to Cornwall to investigate the fisherman's death, and although his injuries seem to include radiation burns, they find no evidence of radiation on the beach. Then, Karnes goes to inspect a passenger ship found wrecked and badly damaged, with the loss of all on board. Back in London, the two scientists discovered that samples of the dead fish contain large amounts of radioactive contamination. Karnes begins to suspect that the "behemoth" that the fisherman described seeing is some kind of large marine animal that has mutated as a result of being contaminated by nuclear testing.

The next attack is on a farm near the coast in Essex. A photo of the area reveals a huge footprint and paleontologist Dr. Sampson identifies the creature as a Paleosaurus, an aquatic dinosaur that emits an electric pulse like an electric eel. Karnes believes that the dinosaur is saturated by radiation, which is transmitted by the electric pulse, resulting in the burns seen on the fisherman and other victims. The radiation is also slowly killing the dinosaur. According to Dr. Sampson, the dying creature will leave the ocean depths to head upstream, seeking out the shallow waters where it was born, but death by radiation may not come soon enough to prevent the creature from wreaking havoc on London along the way.

Karnes and Bickford try to persuade authorities to close the River Thames, but the military officer believes that their radar tracking systems will be enough to detect the behemoth and prevent it from getting near the city. Unfortunately, the dinosaur appears to be invisible to radar. Dr. Sampson and some other scientists spot it from a Royal Navy helicopter, but the radar equipment tracking the helicopter sees no sign of the beast, which destroys the helicopter when it gets too close. Soon, the behemoth surfaces in the Thames and capsizes the Woolwich Ferry.

Rising from the river, the creature sets the city on fire. Bickford and Karnes advise the military that the best way to kill the beast will be to administer a dose of radium, hoping to accelerate the radiation sickness that is already slowly killing it. While they prepare the dose, the behemoth continues its rampage, eventually plummeting through London Bridge back into the Thames.

Karnes and Bickford set their plan into action. An X-class submarine with Karnes on board carries a torpedo filled with radium into the Thames in pursuit of the monster. During an initial pass, the behemoth takes a bite out of the mini-sub, but Karnes convinces the submarine captain to have another go. This time, they succeed in firing the torpedo into the monster's mouth, and the behemoth roars in pain. Observers in helicopters later confirm the monster's demise.

As Karnes and Bickford climb into a car to leave the area, they hear a radio report of dead fish washing up on the eastern shores of the United States.

== Cast ==
- Gene Evans as Steve Karnes
- André Morell as Prof. James Bickford
- John Turner as John
- Leigh Madison as Jean Trevethan
- Jack MacGowran as Dr. Sampson, the palaeontologist
- Maurice Kaufmann as the mini-submarine officer
- Henri Vidon as Thomas Trevethan
- Leonard Sachs as scientist
- Julian Somers as Rear Admiral Summers

== Production ==
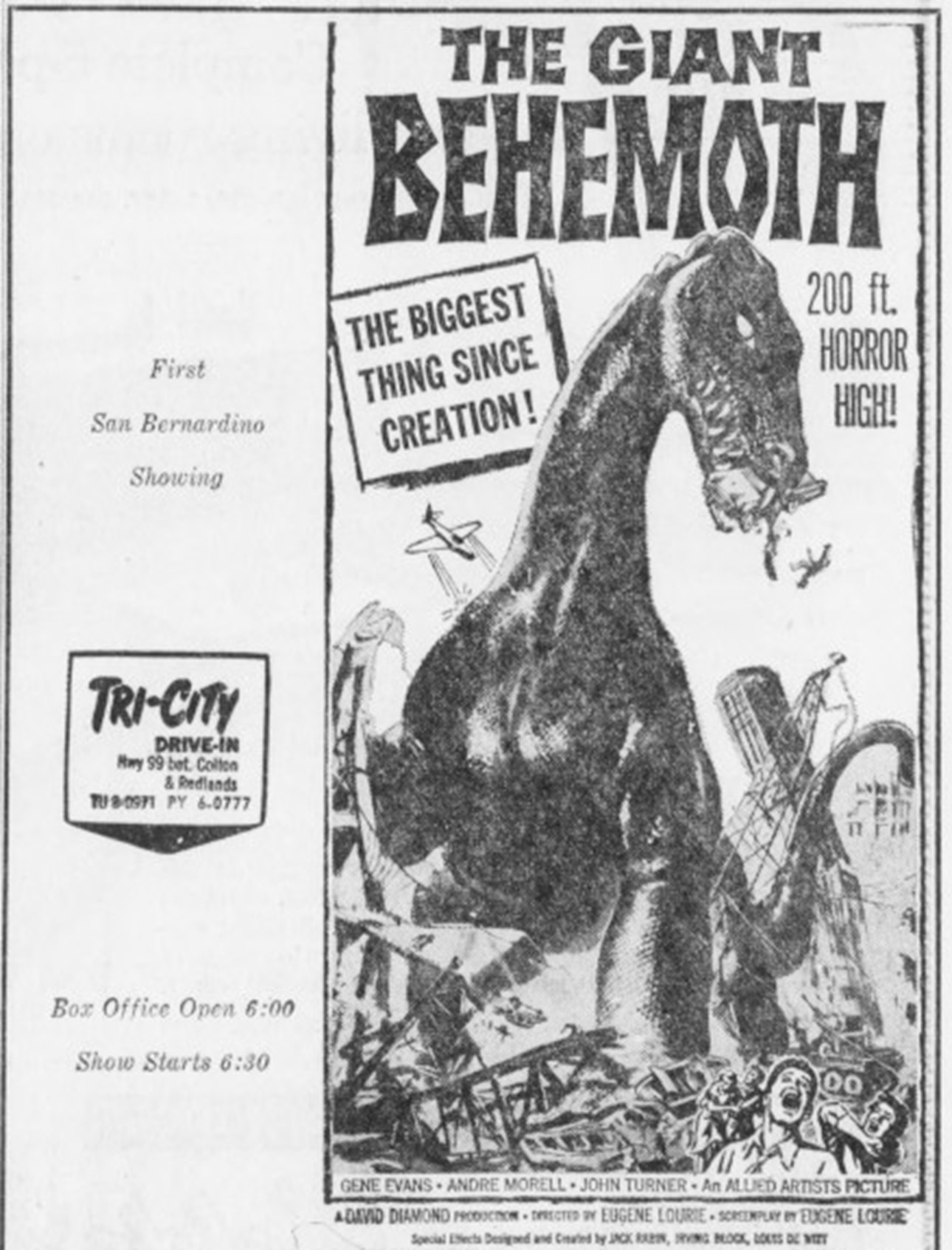
Drive-in advertisement from 1959

The live action scenes for The Giant Behemoth were filmed entirely in Great Britain, including London. The stop-motion animation special effects by Willis O'Brien were shot in a Los Angeles studio, where they were also optically integrated with the live-action footage.

In an odd connection between O'Brien and his most famous creation, stock screams that were used in King Kong can be heard in the scenes where the creature attacks the ferry and when it invades London.

In the book Video Movie Guide 2002, mention of the stop-action animation was made, but with the proviso that "the film monster wasn't bad but Willis O'Brien was clearly working with a low budget".

The original 71m 07s version, as The Giant Behemoth, was initially given an X certificate by the British Board of Film Censors on 9 January 1959, before a version cut to 69m 07s, as Behemoth the Sea Monster, was given an A certificate four days later.

In Germany the film was known as Das Ungeheuer von Loch Ness (The Monster from Loch Ness).

== Reception ==
The Monthly Film Bulletin wrote: "This is considerably better than many recent essays in monster science-fiction, both in its suspense and staging; but the story, though put over as convincingly as possible, remains stuck at routine outsize-palaeontology level."

James Lowder reviewed The Giant Behemoth in White Wolf Inphobia #56 (June, 1995), rating it a 2 out of 5 and stated that "Behemoth's performances are workmanlike, but hardly inspired. The special effects are also lackluster. Master monster-maker Willis O'Brien ended his career with this dreary film. A few sequences display his touch [...] but the film's effects fall far short of his brilliant work on King Kong or The Lost World."

American film critic Andrew Wickliffe considered the lead up to the appearance of the monster to be more interesting than the rampage that follows, writing, "I'm not sure the British are really suited for giant monster movies. No offense to the Brits, but watching a bunch of folks stand around and keep the stiff upper lip while radioactive monsters from the deep attack London isn't too much fun".

Regarding a later release of the film in a package with other science fiction features, film reviewer Glenn Erickson observed that The Giant Behemoth was derivative, speculating that "... director Eugène Lourié apparently instructed writers Robert Abel and Alan Adler to repackage his original The Beast from 20,000 Fathoms, copying whole scenes and situations. The structure and script are almost a verbatim clone, right down to the dotty paleontologist".

== See also ==
- List of films featuring dinosaurs

== Bibliography ==
- Warren, Bill. Keep Watching the Skies! Science Fiction Movies of the Fifties: 21st Century Edition. 2009. Jefferson, North Carolina: McFarland & Company, (first editions Vol. 1, 1982, Vol. 2, 1986). ISBN 0899500323.
