= Jadwiga Piechowska =

Polish painter active in France (1885–1944)

Jadwiga Piechowska (20 June 1885, Odesa – 14 November 1944), francized as Edwige Piechowska, was a Polish painter active in France. Studying at the Academy of Fine Arts in Warsaw, Piechowska continued her studies in Florence where she met her future husband the painter Manuel Ortíz de Zárate. Moving to Paris between 1905 and 1906, Piechowska and Ortíz de Zárate lived and worked in studios in Montparnasse. The couple had two children, the youngest of whom was the costume designer Laure Lourié. Piechowska died on 14 November 1944, and was buried at Cimetière parisien de Bagneux.
