= Gorgo (film) =

1960 film directed by Eugène Lourié

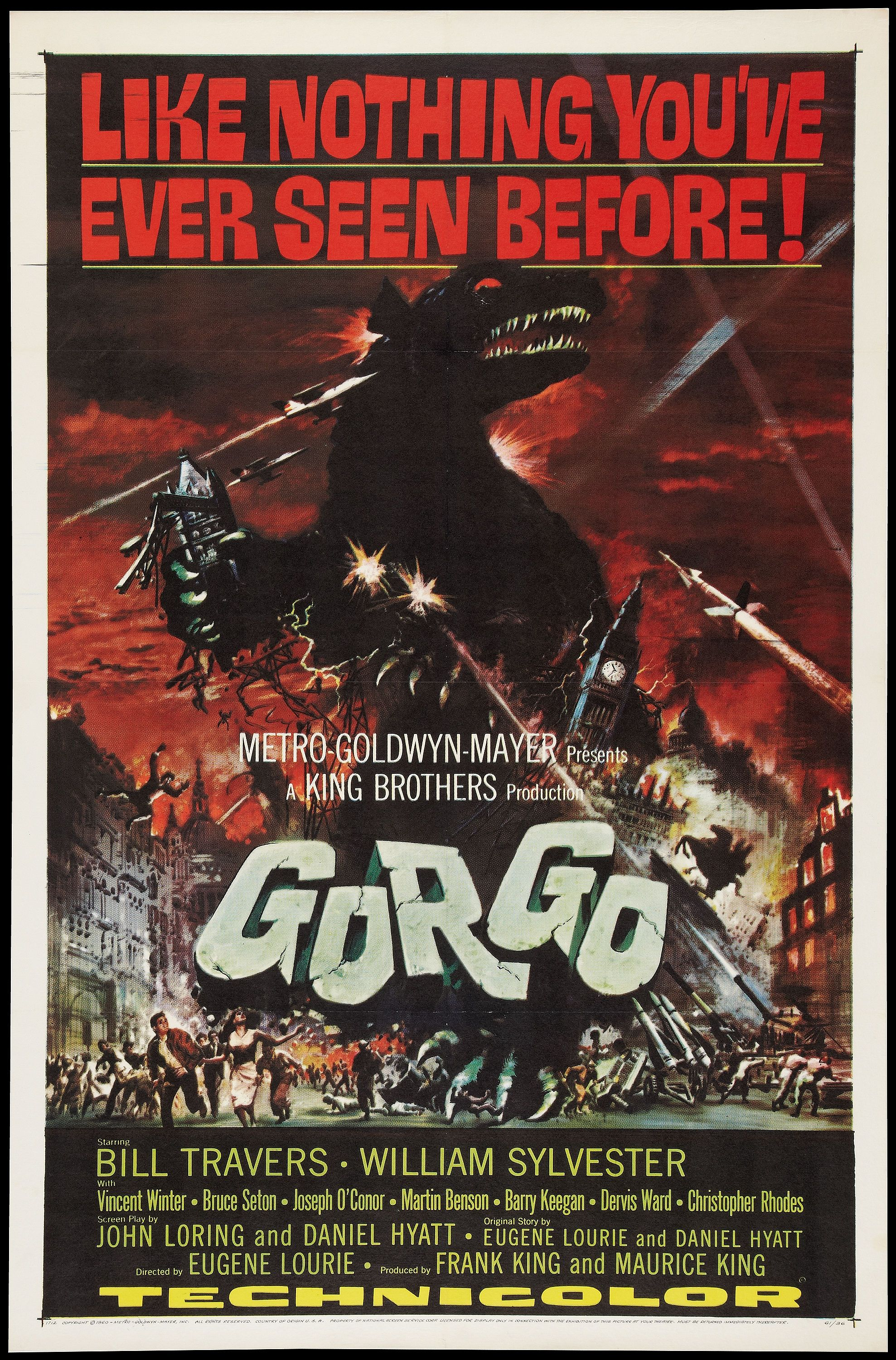
- U.S. theatrical release poster
- Directed by: Eugène Lourié
- Screenplay by: Robert L. Richards; (as John Loring); Daniel James; (as Daniel Hyatt)
- Story by: Eugène Lourié; Daniel James
- Produced by: Wilfred Eades
- Starring: Bill Travers; William Sylvester; Vincent Winter
- Cinematography: Freddie Young
- Edited by: Eric Boyd-Perkins
- Music by: Angelo Francesco Lavagnino
- Production company: King Brothers Productions; British Lion Films
- Distributed by: British Lion-Columbia Distributors (UK); MGM (international)
- Release dates: 24 December 1960 (Japan); 10 February 1961 (Philadelphia); 27 October 1961 (London)
- Running time: 78 minutes
- Country: United Kingdom
- Language: English
- Budget: U.S.$1.5 million
- Box office: U.S.$1.55 million (U.S. rentals)

Gorgo is a 1961 British horror monster film directed by Eugène Lourié and featuring special effects by Tom Howard, and starring Bill Travers, William Sylvester and Vincent Winter. In the film, after an undersea volcano sends tremors throughout the Atlantic, a prehistoric creature is released from under the sea. The crew of a salvage vessel capture the giant amphibious creature and take it to London for public exhibition. It results in the creature's much larger mother invading London in search of her offspring, causing catastrophic destruction across the city in the process.

Gorgo was produced by the King Brothers and British Lion Films, and was distributed in the United Kingdom by British Lion-Columbia on October 27, 1961.

== Plot ==
Joe Ryan and Sam Slade are partners in a salvage business, operating the vessel Triton off the Irish coast, with Ryan as master. After a submarine volcanic eruption damages the Triton, they put in at Nara Island for repairs. At harbormaster McCartin's cottage they meet Sean, an orphan who works for McCartin, and see his collection of Viking artifacts, including a carving Sean calls "Ogra, the sea spirit."

McCartin is unwelcoming. On their way back to the ship, Ryan and Slade find the body of a drowned diver, with gold coins in his hand. They dive the harbor to investigate and catch a brief glimpse of a large creature underwater.

McCartin summons the two men and orders them to stop snooping and leave the island. Ryan counters by producing the gold coins taken from the dead diver, and threatens to report McCartin's illegal hoard to the authorities unless he cooperates.

While this confrontation occurs, a party of islanders, believing a shark killed the diver, puts out in boats with torches to hunt it. They encounter the creature, which follows them to shore. When guns fail, Joe, Sam, and the villagers drive it back into the sea with burning firebrands.

When McCarin's men threaten to leave the island the following day, Joe and Sam make a deal with McCartin, to kill the monster taking a valuable item from McCartin's hoard as payment. Sean warns them that they have made a mistake, but the two men ignore him. On the way back to the Triton Joe and Sam discuss the value of such a creature should it be captured alive.

When the crew of the Triton are successful in capturing the creature, two university scientists arrive from Dublin to meet Ryan and Slade, hoping to obtain it for scientific study. However, Ryan has already sold the creature to Dorkin's Circus in London.

Dorkin names the creature "Gorgo", after the gorgon Medusa, before transporting it to a large, enclosed pit for public exhibition in Battersea Park. Ryan and Slade meet the scientists again, who inform them the creature is an infant. With its larger mother still out there, the Royal Navy takes charge of the operation. Later that night Gorgo's mother, Ogra, emerges from the sea and attacks Nara Island in search of her offspring before leaving. When she attacks again in the morning, a Royal Navy destroyer intercepts her, but she proves immune to their weapons and sinks it, killing all aboard.

The mother later attacks London. The military intervene, but fail to stop or destroy her. Tower Bridge, the Palace of Westminster and Piccadilly Circus are among the landmarks destroyed, as the death toll mounts. Ryan and Slade split up to find Sean, with the former finding the boy and keeping him safe, the three of them later rendezvous with Ryan apologising to Slade admiting that he was wrong for wanting to capture the creature. Gorgo's mother is eventually reunited with her offspring and frees him from the pit, before they both return safely to the sea without further incident.

== Cast ==
- Bill Travers as Joe Ryan
- William Sylvester as Sam Slade
- Vincent Winter as Sean
- Christopher Rhodes as Kevin McCartin
- Joseph O'Conor as Prof. Leroy Hendricks
- Bruce Seton as Prof. Marius Flaherty
- Martin Benson as Andrew Dorkin
- Basil Dignam as Admiral Hugh Brooks
- Barry Keegan as First Mate Harry
- Dervis Ward as Bosun Mike

Uncredited

- Ed Bishop as Radar Operator
- Nigel Green as Newsman
- Mick Dillon as Gorgo
- Dave Wilding as Ogra

== Production ==
Gorgo was originally intended to be a co-production between King Brothers and an unspecified Japanese entity, with a Japanese setting. The setting was then changed to France and then finally to the British Isles after the producers chose to make the film with British Lion Films. In April 1961, producer Herman King stated that Gorgo had cost approximately $1.5 million to produce in the United Kingdom, noting that an equivalent production in Hollywood would have cost an estimated $3 million.

Shooting took place at MGM-British Studios in Borehamwood, Hertfordshire, and on-location in London and the suburbs of Dublin, Ireland. The location where Gorgo first appears, the fictional Nara Island, is an anagram of the Aran Islands, off Ireland's west coast. The exterior scenes set in Ireland were filmed at Coliemore Harbor, Dalkey. Scenes in which Gorgo is driven through the streets of London were filmed on a Sunday afternoon, when traffic levels were low.

According to interviews with camera operator Douglas Adamson, Gorgo's effects combined suitmation with large scale miniature sets, a technique mainly associated with the Godzilla films. Adamson noted that the smaller size of the juvenile Gorgo required sets to be built at an increased scale, and that high speed photography was used to convey greater mass and scale.

== Release ==
Gorgo distribution rights were acquired for the United Kingdom by British Lion Films during production. International distribution was acquired by MGM after protracted negotiations.

The film had its world premiere in Japan on 24 December 1960,. It began its United States premiere engagement in Philadelphia on 10 February 1961 although there had been earlier trial and preview screenings. The United Kingdom premiere was at the London Pavilion on 27 October 1961.

=== Home media ===
In 1984, Gorgo was released on VHS by Memory Lane Video. It was re-released on VHS in 1987 by United Home Video, and again in 1995 by Alpha Video.

In 2013, Gorgo was released on DVD and Blu-ray in Region A by VCI Video; this release includes a documentary titled Ninth Wonder of the World: The Making of Gorgo, directed by Daniel Griffith. That same year, Shout! Factory released the film on Blu-ray as part of its Mystery Science Theater 3000 25th-Anniversary Edition collection, featuring an extended cut of Ninth Wonder of the World: The Making of Gorgo. In 2023, a 4K restoration of Gorgo was released on a Blu-ray/4K Ultra HD combo by Vinegar Syndrome.

== Reception ==
=== Box office ===
The film opened big at the London Pavilion and had good business for two weeks.

=== Critical response ===
A reviewer for The Kensington News and West London Times called Gorgo "a sad waste, not of talent, but of opportunity. Some of the effects are very convincing, but these are offset by the general tone of the film. It is a satire on monsters. Gorgo could have been a fine film. It could have preached motherly love, the vanity of humanity, mankind's true weakness or it could have been purely terrifying. Unfortunately it doesn't do anything". Arthur Steele of the Birmingham Evening Mail described the film as being "designed for juvenile adults".

Charles Stinson of the Los Angeles Times referred to the film's screenplay as "not unintelligent. But it is entirely routine". Stinson also lamented the camerawork as unimaginative, yet added: "The color is true and rich, though, and the special effects fairly skillful. The British do things tidily".

James Lowder reviewed Gorgo in White Wolf Inphobia #56 (June 1995), rating it a 3 1/2 out of 5 and stating that "Tom Howard's special effects are great, with some spiffy scenes of London getting the big rubber boot. The guy in the Gorgo suit gets to stomp Tower Bridge, Big Ben, Picadilly Circus and lots of row houses. The monster would be more frightening, however, if it didn't keep wiggling its huge, finlike ears."

The film was short-listed for Best Visual Effects at the 34th Academy Awards, but was ultimately not nominated.

== Legacy ==
Gorgo was used by rock band Ash for their promo video for "Ichiban". It was the seventh release of their A-Z singles series, a year-long 26-single subscription. Using a copy of the DVD and free movie editing software, the video allegedly only cost $8.00 to produce.

In 2010 a short comedy film titled Waiting for Gorgo was produced by the British production company Cinemagine. The film was directed by Benjamin Craig and written by M. J. Simpson. The plot focuses on the D.M.O.A., a top secret British government agency charged with preventing the return of the monster Gorgo. Between 2010 and 2012, the film screened at over 26 international film festivals, including the Clermont-Ferrand International Short Film Festival, the Seattle International Film Festival, and the Strasbourg European Fantastic Film Festival. The film was awarded a Special Jury Prize at both the Festiwal KAN (Festiwal Kina Amatorskiego i Niezależnego KAN) (Poland) and the FILMCARAVAN International Film Festival (Italy), and Best Short Film at the Cantoo Film Festival (U.S.).

Former Maine Governor Angus King used a clip from Gorgo in an advertisement for his 2012 run for the United States Senate.

In the 1997 Disney film remake Flubber, Flubber was seen flicking through TV channels when it had separated into several versions of itself. Scenes of Gorgo's mother, Ogra, rampaging through London could be seen flashing on the screen as Flubber was switching channels.

Gorgo made a cameo appearance in the 1995-1997 animated TV series The Twisted Tales of Felix the Cat.

Gorgo influenced several Japanese kaiju productions, such as the films Gappa: The Triphibian Monster, Godzilla vs. Mechagodzilla II and Gamera the Brave, the TV series Spectreman, and the animated TV series Godzilla: The Series.

=== Mystery Science Theater 3000 ===
In 1998, the film was featured on episode #909 of the movie mocking TV series Mystery Science Theater 3000. The episode premiered on July 18, 1998, airing twice that day on the Sci-Fi Channel; because of rights issues, the episode never aired again on TV. Film critic Leonard Maltin appeared at the beginning of the episode to introduce the film, helping one of the TV series' villains, Pearl Forrester, select a painful film; he also appeared at the end of the episode. Writer / performer Kevin Murphy called Maltin "a charming, affable, thoroughly professional man" who worked well with the TV series' actress Mary Jo Pehl, who played Forrester. However, he quibbled with Maltin's rating of Gorgo — which Murphy termed a "wormy layer of filmic offal" — in his Movie Guide: "Too bad he gave Gorgo three stars, the dope."

Paste writer Jim Vorel ranked the episode #128. (Note: Ranking based on 197 episodes as of 2018.) Vorel wrote that Gorgo was a pale British knockoff of Godzilla and did not stand up to the two MST3K episodes featuring the famous Japanese giant monster. Vorel also called Gorgo "dour" and dull, complaining, "There's just no way that a giant monster movie in the vein of Gorgo should be able to be this boring ... it's as if it inherited the stuffy British DNA of The Projected Man. At least the Japanese films are colorfully silly." Writer Chris Morgan listed Gorgo as the 10th worst monster in an MST3K film because its "utter lack of originality."

Despite the aforementioned rights issues, Shout! Factory was able to license the film again and release the episode on DVD as part of its box set Mystery Science Theater 3000: The 25th Anniversary Edition on December 10, 2013. The Gorgo disc included the featurette Ninth Wonder of the World: The Making of Gorgo and a one-minute bonus feature with Maltin, "Leonard Maltin Explains Something," in which he talked about his affection for Gorgo. The disc also included Gorgo's theatrical trailer. Other episodes included in the box set were Moon Zero Two (episode #111), The Day the Earth Froze (episode #422), Mitchell (episode #512), The Brain That Wouldn't Die (episode #513), and The Leech Woman (episode #802).

== Other media ==
=== Novel and comic book adaptations ===
Gorgo
- Cover to issue #4 of Gorgo published by Charlton Comics, art by Steve Ditko

Publication information
- Publisher: Charlton Comics
- Schedule: Bi-monthly
- Format: Ongoing series
- Genre: Fantasy
- Publication date: Gorgo: 1961 – Sept. 1965; Gorgo's Revenge (vol. 2): 1962; The Return of Gorgo (vol. 3): summer 1962 – fall 1964
- No. of issues: Gorgo: 23; Gorgo's Revenge (vol. 2): 1 The Return of Gorgo (vol. 3): 2
- Main character: Gorgo

Creative team
- Written by: Joe Gill
- Artist(s): Steve Ditko; Dick Giordano; Rocco Mastroserio

A novelization of the film was released in paperback at the time of its original release written by Bruce Cassiday under the pseudonym Carson Bingham (Monarch Books 1960).

From 1961 to 1965, Charlton Comics published 23 issues of the comic book series Gorgo. It included work by Spider-Man co-creator Steve Ditko. The series was retitled Fantastic Giants with issue #24, which turned out to be its last issue.

Gorgo also appeared in a three-issue miniseries that started off as Gorgo's Revenge, before it was retitled The Return of Gorgo with issue #2. The miniseries ran from 1962 to 1964.

In 1967, after their licence to Gorgo had expired, Charlton Comics featured a modified version of the character named "Junior" in The Fightin' 5 (vol. 2) #41.

In 1990, Steve Ditko illustrated a back-up story in Web of Spider-Man Annual #6 titled "Child Star". In this story, Captain Universe creates huge versions of toy monsters based on the films Gorgo and Konga to battle giant monsters that are attacking New York City. Due to copyright reasons, Gorgo's name was altered to "Gorga". This sequence was Ditko paying homage to his earlier work with these two characters in their 1960s Charlton Comics comic book series.

In 1991, A-Plus Comics reprinted issues #1 and 3 in the one-shot Attack of the Mutant Monsters. Again due to copyright reasons, Gorgo's name was changed to Kegor.

Some of these issues were reprinted (in black and white) in a trade paperback published in 2011 titled Angry Apes n' Leapin' Lizards.

In March 2013, IDW Publishing reprinted all of the issues that artist Steve Ditko had worked on (Gorgo #1–3, 11 and 13–16 and The Return of Gorgo #2–3) as a deluxe hardcover collection called Ditko's Monsters: Gorgo!. In April 2019, IDW published a book titled Ditko's Monsters: Gorgo vs. Konga, which collected issues #1 and 13 of the series.

In September 2021, Fantaco published all of the issues that Joe Sinnott and Vince Colletta had worked on (issues #5-10 and 12) in a collection titled Gorgo Attacks!.

Starting in December 2022, PS Artbooks began reprinting the entire series in a series of hardcover and trade paperback editions.

In the summer of 2025 Titanic Creations, which had acquired the merchandising rights for Gorgo, released a series of comic books placing the film's events within the universe of their original kaiju characters, starting with a prequel story titled Gorgo Legacy.

== See also ==
- List of films featuring dinosaurs
