= Anaconda (film series) =

Horror film series

- Cover for the UK DVD box set containing the first four films
- Created by: Hans Bauer; Jim Cash; Jack Epps Jr.
- Original work: Anaconda (1997)
- Owner: Sony Pictures Entertainment
- Years: 1997–present

Print publications
- Novel: Anaconda: The Writer's Cut (2014)

Films and television
- Films: List of films

Games
- Video games: List of video games

Audio
- Soundtracks: List of soundtracks

Miscellaneous
- Theme park attractions: List of theme park attractions

Anaconda (also known as Anacondas) is a series of American natural horror films created by Hans Bauer, Jim Cash and Jack Epps Jr., and was distributed by Sony Pictures Entertainment. The series began with Anaconda (1997) and was followed by one theatrical stand-alone sequel, Anacondas: The Hunt for the Blood Orchid (2004), three television sequels (Anaconda 3: Offspring (2008), Anacondas: Trail of Blood (2009), and Lake Placid vs. Anaconda (2015), the latter being a crossover with the Lake Placid film series), and a theatrical meta-reboot, Anaconda (2025). In addition, an indirect Chinese remake of the first two films also titled, Anaconda was released in 2024. Each installment revolves around giant man-eating anacondas and the efforts of various groups of people to capture or destroy the creatures. The fictional plant known as the Blood Orchid and the company Wexel Hall Pharmaceuticals as well as the fictitious Murdoch family are repeatedly referenced in the films.

== Films ==
Film	U.S. release date	Director(s)	Screenwriter(s)	Story by	Producer(s)
Anaconda	April 11, 1997	Luis Llosa	Hans Bauer, Jim Cash & Jack Epps Jr.	Hans Bauer, Jim Cash & Jack Epps Jr.	Verna Harrah, Carol Little & Leonard Rabinowitz
Anacondas: The Hunt for the Blood Orchid	August 27, 2004	Dwight H. Little	John Claflin, Daniel Zelman, Michael Miner & Edward Neumeier	Hans Bauer, Jim Cash & Jack Epps Jr.	Verna Harrah
Anaconda 3: Offspring	July 26, 2008	Don E. FauntLeRoy	Nicholas Davidoff & David Olson	Nicholas Davidoff & David Olson	Alison Semenza
Anacondas: Trail of Blood	February 28, 2009	Don E. FauntLeRoy	David Olson	David Olson	Alison Semenza
Lake Placid vs. Anaconda	April 25, 2015	A.B. Stone	Berkeley Anderson	Berkeley Anderson	Jeffery Beach & Phillip Roth
Anaconda	March 1, 2024 (China); December 9, 2025	Xiang Quiliang & Xiang Hesheng	Foxfoxbee	Foxfoxbee	Xiang Quiliang & Xiang Hesheng
Anaconda	December 25, 2025	Tom Gormican	Tom Gormican & Kevin Etten	Tom Gormican & Kevin Etten	Brad Fuller, Andrew Form, Kevin Etten & Tom Gormican

Anaconda story chronology
Original continuity
- Anaconda (1997)
- Anacondas:
  The Hunt for the Blood Orchid (2004)
- Anaconda 3: Offspring (2008)
- Anacondas: Trail of Blood (2009)
- Lake Placid vs. Anaconda (2015)
Remake continuity
- Anaconda (2024)
Meta-reboot continuity
- Anaconda (2025)

=== Anaconda (1997) ===
A documentary film crew travels deep into the Amazon rainforest to film a story about a secluded tribe. They encounter a massive, deadly anaconda that begins hunting them one by one. As the crew fights for survival, they realize they are not only being stalked by the snake but also by a mysterious man who seeks to capture the giant snake.

=== Anacondas: The Hunt for the Blood Orchid (2004) ===
A group of researchers from Wexel Hall embarks on an expedition to the jungles of Borneo in search of the rare Blood Orchid, believed to have medicinal properties. However, they encounter a massive breed of aggressive and dangerous Anacondas. As they venture deeper into the jungle, they must fight for survival against both the snakes, the unforgiving environment, and their own ambitions.

=== Anaconda 3: Offspring (2008) ===
The film follows a team of scientists working in a remote facility for Wexel Hall where they are experimenting with genetic engineering and the Blood Orchid. They inadvertently create a new breed of anacondas, which grows to monstrous size and escapes into the wild. As the snakes escape and wreak havoc, a group of mercenaries and the scientists must work together to stop it before it reaches a populated area.

=== Anacondas: Trail of Blood (2009) ===
Amanda Hayes, a former scientist behind the creation of genetically engineered anacondas of the third film, must stop the last of the mutant anacondas she helped create after it gained regenerative abilities from the Blood Orchid's experiments. As the creature grows deadlier, Amanda joins a group of survivors to track it down and prevent it from wreacking further havoc.

=== Lake Placid vs. Anaconda (2015) ===
Wexel Hall inadvertently causes a new generation of anacondas to escape into the crocodile-infested Black Lake. As the deadly snakes wreak havoc on the town, Sheriff Reba and her team must face off against the killer reptiles. With both creatures threatening the town's survival, the characters must find a way to stop the carnage and prevent further destruction.

=== Anaconda (2024) ===
Anaconda (狂蟒之灾) (also known as Hundred Poisons Rampage) is a 2024 Chinese horror film, an indirect remake was borrowed significantly from the 1997 film and the 2004 sequel. The film was released in China on March 1, 2024, with streaming services Youku and Tencent Video, later released internationally on January 23, 2025, and in the United States on December 9, 2025, under the title Anaconda: Cursed Jungle. It was written by Foxfoxbee, and produced and directed by Xiang Quiliang and Xiang Hesheng. This Anaconda remake comes courtesy of Canno Studio Pictures, Xiang Bros Studios, and Sony Pictures Television.

=== Anaconda (2025) ===
In January 2020, it was announced that Columbia Pictures was developing a reboot of the 1997 cult film Anaconda, with Evan Daugherty attached to write the screenplay. In March 2023, Tom Gormican was attached as the director of the film. In August 2024, Jack Black and Paul Rudd were cast in the leading roles, with Tom Gormican confirmed to direct from a screenplay written by Gormican and Kevin Etten, changing the story and genre into a meta-reboot. In September, Daniela Melchior joined the cast. In December, it was announced that the film will officially be releasing on December 25, 2025.

== Cast ==
List indicators

This section includes characters who will appear or have appeared in the franchise.

- An empty grey cell indicates the character was not in the film, or that the character's official presence has not yet been confirmed.
- ^{A} indicates an appearance through archival footage or audio.
- ^{C} indicates a cameo role.
- ^{U} indicates an uncredited appearance.
- ^{V} indicates a voice-only role.
- ^{Y} indicates a younger version of the character.

Characters
Characters	Anaconda	Anacondas: The Hunt for the Blood Orchid	Anaconda 3: Offspring	Anacondas: Trail of Blood	Lake Placid vs. Anaconda	Anaconda	Anaconda
Characters	1997	2004	2008	2009	2015	2024	2025
Anacondas	Frank Welker^{v} Gary A. Hecker^{v}	Appeared	Appeared	Appeared	Appeared	Appeared	Appeared
Terri Flores	Jennifer Lopez	Mentioned					
Danny Rich	Ice Cube	Mentioned					
Paulerson "Paul" Serone	Jon Voight	Mentioned					
Professor Steven "Steve" Cale	Eric Stoltz	Mentioned					
Warren Westridge	Jonathan Hyde	Mentioned					
Gary Dixon	Owen Wilson	Mentioned					
Denise Kalberg	Kari Wuhrer	Mentioned					
Mateo	Vincent Castellanos						
Poacher	Danny Trejo						
William "Bill" Johnson		Johnny Messner					
Samantha "Sam" Rogers		KaDee Strickland					
Dr. Jackson "Jack" Bryon		Matthew Marsden					
Cole Burris		Eugene Byrd					
Gail Stern		Salli Richardson-Whitfield					
Tran Wu		Karl Yune					
Gordon Mitchell		Morris Chestnut					
Dr. Benjamin "Ben" Douglas		Nicholas Gonzalez					
John Livingston		Andy Anderson					
Stephen Hammett			David Hasselhoff				
Dr. Amanda Hayes			Crystal Allen	Crystal Allen			
Peter "J.D." Murdoch			John Rhys-Davies	John Rhys-Davies	Mentioned		
Pinkus			Ryan McCluskey				
Nick			Patrick Regis				
Andrei			Alin Olteanu				
Grozny			Anthony Green	Anthony Green^{A}			
Victor			Toma Danilă	Toma Danilă^{A}			
Sofia			Milhaela Oros	Milhaela Oros^{A}			
Professor Eric Kane			Şerban Celea	Şerban Celea^{A}			
Darryl			Alin Constantinescu	Alin Constantinescu^{A}			
Peter Reysner			Zoltan Butuc	Zoltan Butuc			
Murdoch's Assistant			Cristina Teodorescu	Cristina Teodorescu			
Little Boy			George Chitu				
Mother Wendy			Anca Androne	Anca Androne			
Jackson				Linden Ashby			
Scott				Danny Midwinter			
Alex				Călin Stanciu			
Heather				Ana Ularu			
Eugene				Emil Hostina			
Roland Patrick				Alexandru Potoceanu			
Will "Tully" Tull					Corin Nemec		
Reba					Yancy Butler		
Bethany Tull					Skye Lourie		
Jim Bickerman					Robert Englund		
Sarah Murdoch					Annabel Wright		
Beach					Stephen Billington^{U}		
Tiffani					Laura Dale		
Margo					Ali Eagle		
Jane					Heather Gilbert		
Jennifer					Georgina Philipps		
Melissa					Jenny May Darcy		
Deputy Ferguson					Oliver Walker		
Jeff						Terence Yin	
Gong Lan Lan						Nita Lei	
Ali						Wang Xing Chen	
Di Jiao						Wang Gang	
Jia Peng						Wang Zirun	
Jin Ba Liang						Shaohang Xu	
Zhang Tian Shi						Tat-Wah Lok	
Circus Boss						Jiu Kong	
Captain Sarai						Paul Che	
Ronald "Griff" Griffen Jr.							Paul Rudd Romeo Ellard^{Y}
Doug McCallister							Jack Black Jack Waters^{Y}
Kenny Trent							Steve Zahn Reagan George^{Y}
Claire Simons							Thandiwe Newton Aimee Bah^{Y}
Ana Almeida							Daniela Melchior
Carlos Santiago Braga							Selton Mello
Malie McCallister							Ione Skye
Ice Cube							Himself^{C}
Jennifer Lopez							Herself^{U}^{C}

== Additional production and crew details ==
Film	Composer	Cinematographer	Editor(s)	Production companies	Distributing companies	Runtime
Anaconda (1997)	Randy Edelman	Bill Butler	Michael R. Miller	Columbia Pictures Cinema Line Film Corporation	Sony Pictures Releasing	89 minutes
Anacondas: The Hunt for the Blood Orchid	Nerida Tyson-Chew	Stephen F. Windon	Marcus D'Arcy Mark Warner	Screen Gems Middle Fork Productions	Sony Pictures Releasing	97 minutes
Anaconda 3: Offspring	Peter Meisner	Don E. FauntLeRoy	Scott Conrad	Stage 6 Films Hollywood Media Bridge	Sci Fi	91 minutes
Anacondas: Trail of Blood	Peter Meisner	Don E. FauntLeRoy	—N/a	Stage 6 Films Hollywood Media Bridge	Sci Fi	89 minutes
Lake Placid vs. Anaconda	Claude Foisy	Ivo Peitchev	Cameron Hallenbeck	Destination Films UFO International	Syfy	92 minutes
Anaconda (2024)	—N/a	—N/a	—N/a	Canno Studio Pictures Xiang Bros Studios	Sony Pictures Television	84 minutes
Anaconda (2025)	David Fleming	Nigel Bluck	Craig Alpert Gregory Plotkin	Columbia Pictures Fully Formed Entertainment	Sony Pictures Releasing	99 minutes

== Reception ==
=== Box office performance ===
Film	Year	Box office gross			Budget	Ref.
Film	Year	North America	Other territories	Worldwide	Budget	Ref.
Anaconda	1997	$65,598,907	$71,400,000	$136,998,907	$45 million	
Anacondas: The Hunt for the Blood Orchid	2004	$32,238,923	$38,753,975	$70,992,898	$20–25 million	
Anaconda	2025	$65,098,148	$70,292,258	$135,390,406	$45 million	
Total		$162,935,978	$180,446,233	$343,382,211	$110–115 million	

=== Critical response ===
Film	Rotten Tomatoes	Metacritic	CinemaScore
Anaconda (1997)	41% (58 reviews)	37 (20 reviews)	B+
Anacondas: The Hunt for the Blood Orchid	26% (120 reviews)	40 (28 reviews)	B
Anaconda 3: Offspring	—N/a	—N/a	—N/a
Anacondas: Trail of Blood	—N/a	—N/a	—N/a
Lake Placid vs. Anaconda	—N/a	—N/a	—N/a
Anaconda (2024)	—N/a	—N/a	—N/a
Anaconda (2025)	48% (159 reviews)	43 (33 reviews)	B

== Music ==
Soundtracks to Anaconda films
Title	U.S. release date	Length	Composed by	Label
Anaconda (Original Motion Picture Soundtrack)	April 22, 1997	33:56	Randy Edelman	Edel America Records
Anacondas: The Hunt for the Blood Orchid (Original Motion Picture Soundtrack)	August 30, 2004	60:57	Nerida Tyson-Chew	Varèse Sarabande
Anaconda (Original Motion Picture Soundtrack)	December 25, 2025	40:48	David Fleming	Madison Gate Records

== Other media ==
=== Novel ===
==== Anaconda: The Writer's Cut (2014) ====
Anaconda: The Writer's Cut is a novel by Hans Bauer published in 2014. Bauer also wrote the screenplay for the 1997 film Anaconda and its 2004 sequel Anacondas: The Hunt for the Blood Orchid.

=== Video games ===
==== Quake Anaconda Mod (1997) ====
Promoting the original film's release, Sony released a free total conversion mod for Quake Mission Pack No. 1: Scourge of Armagon, which featured new snake enemies and a large Anaconda boss character.

==== Anacondas Arcade Game (2004) ====
Anacondas Arcade Game is an online interactive game produced by Sony Studios in 2004 to promote the film Anacondas: The Hunt for the Blood Orchid from the same year.

==== Anacondas 3D: Adventure Game (2004) ====
Anacondas 3D: Adventure Game is an online interactive game produced by Sony Studios in 2004 to promote the film Anacondas: The Hunt for the Blood Orchid from the same year.

==== Snakes on a Babe (2008) ====
Snakes on a Babe is an online interactive game produced in 2008 to promote the film Anaconda 3: Offspring from the same year.

=== Theme park attractions ===
On July 31, 2026, United Parks & Resorts confirmed that two haunted houses based on the 2025 film Anaconda for their Howl-O-Scream events at both Busch Gardens Tampa Bay and Busch Gardens Williamsburg.
