= Anaconda (2025 film) =

Film by Tom Gormican

- Theatrical release poster
- Directed by: Tom Gormican
- Written by: Tom Gormican; Kevin Etten
- Based on: Anaconda by: Hans Bauer; Jim Cash; Jack Epps Jr.
- Produced by: Brad Fuller; Andrew Form; Kevin Etten; Tom Gormican
- Starring: Paul Rudd; Jack Black; Steve Zahn; Thandiwe Newton; Daniela Melchior; Selton Mello
- Cinematography: Nigel Bluck
- Edited by: Craig Alpert; Gregory Plotkin
- Music by: David Fleming
- Production companies: Columbia Pictures; Fully Formed Entertainment
- Distributed by: Sony Pictures Releasing
- Release dates: December 13, 2025 (United Theater on Broadway); December 25, 2025 (United States)
- Running time: 99 minutes
- Country: United States
- Language: English
- Budget: $45 million
- Box office: $135.4 million

Anaconda is a 2025 American action-adventure comedy horror film that serves as a meta-reboot of Anaconda (1997) and is the seventh installment in the Anaconda film series. The film was directed by Tom Gormican, who co-wrote it with Kevin Etten, and stars Paul Rudd, Jack Black, Steve Zahn, Thandiwe Newton, Daniela Melchior and Selton Mello. The story follows a group of childhood friends trying to remake the 1997 film, only to be attacked by a giant and murderous anaconda.

Anaconda had its premiere at the United Theater on Broadway in Los Angeles, California on December 13, 2025, and was released by Sony Pictures Releasing in the United States on December 25. The film received mixed reviews from critics, and grossed $135.4 million worldwide.

== Plot ==
Childhood friends Doug McCallister, Ronald "Griff" Griffin, Kenny Trent, and Claire Simons are all dissatisfied with the way their lives have gone. When Griff, a television actor struggling to find work at Sony Pictures Studios in Culver City, reveals that he has obtained the rights to one of their favorite films, Anaconda, the group secures a loan and travels to the Amazon Rainforest in Brazil to make a low-budget indie version of the film, with Doug directing and writing the script and Griff and Claire starring as the leads.

The group are joined by snake handler Carlos Santiago and Ana Almeida, a woman who claims to be the daughter of the boat rental operator they've been working with. While filming, Griff accidentally kills Heitor, the semi-tame snake they were using. Griff and Santiago venture into the jungle to find a replacement, but Santiago is attacked by a massive anaconda that terrorizes the jungle.

The group finds Santiago's regurgitated body and encounters the anaconda; despite barely escaping with their lives, Doug decides to continue filming and adds Ana as a character in their film. He begins focusing mainly on her, creating friction with Griff. A Sony film crew, which also claims to be remaking Anaconda, passes by. Doug angrily confronts Griff, who admits that he lied about buying the legal rights to the franchise. After an argument, Griff leaves to join the other crew, but arrives there to find the set abandoned and in ruins, the anaconda having killed many of the cast and crew.

Meanwhile, Ana reveals herself to be an illegal gold miner on the run from police. She is apprehended by a police officer who has been tracking her, but Griff reappears and shoots the officer in the leg, unaware of his identity. Ana kills the officer, holds the friends at gunpoint, and demands that they gather gold for her until Claire overpowers and disarms her. Soon, the anaconda appears and drags Ana underwater, killing her and allowing the friends to escape.

As the friends make their way through the jungle, Doug is swallowed whole by the anaconda. Kenny, Griff, and Claire later discover his body; presuming him to be dead, they use him as bait to distract the anaconda. Doug suddenly awakens as the anaconda is approaching him and narrowly escapes.

The friends return to the wrecked Sony film set and encounter actor Ice Cube, who helps scare off the snake and equips the team with weapons before heading out to rescue any surviving crew members. The friends attempt to kill the snake with pyrotechnics, but when that fails, Griff shoots propane tanks with a flare gun to blow up the anaconda, with Doug delivering the final blow to its head.

The friends finish their film, but cannot secure theatrical distribution as Sony sends them a cease-and-desist letter. Griff later lands a role on the TV series S.W.A.T. and marries Claire. Doug is visited by Jennifer Lopez, who liked his film and invites him to direct an authorized reboot. Meanwhile, Santiago is revealed to be alive.

== Cast ==
- Jack Black as Doug McCallister, a wedding videographer
- Paul Rudd as Ronald "Griff" Griffen Jr., a background actor
- Steve Zahn as Kenny Trent, Doug and Griff's friend
- Thandiwe Newton as Claire Simons, Doug and Griff's friend
- Daniela Melchior as Ana Almeida
- Selton Mello as Carlos Santiago Braga, a snake handler
- Ice Cube as himself
- Ione Skye as Malie McCallister, Doug's wife
- Ben Lawson as TV MD - Brant Markham
- Rui Ricardo Diaz as João
- John Billingsley as Jerry
- Cheree Cassidy as Donna, Makeup Artist
- Renee Herbert as Set PA
- Dan Silveira as Timo
- Diego Arnary as Paulo

Additionally, Jennifer Lopez, who appeared in the original Anaconda film, has an uncredited cameo appearance as herself.

== Production ==
On January 24, 2020, Sony Pictures announced it was developing a reboot of the 1997 cult film Anaconda, with Evan Daugherty attached to write the screenplay. In March 2023, Tom Gormican was announced as the director of the film. In August 2024, Jack Black and Paul Rudd were cast in lead roles, with Gormican scribing with frequent collaborator Kevin Etten changing the film's story and genre into a meta-reboot. Rudd was initially cast in Black's role, but when Black came aboard, the actors swapped parts upon Black's insistence. In September 2024, Daniela Melchior joined the cast. In January 2025, Thandiwe Newton, Steve Zahn, Selton Mello, and Ione Skye joined the cast. Principal photography began that month in Queensland, Australia. Filming concluded in early March 2025, before interrupted by Cyclone Alfred. With the film's third act was rewritten due to Alfred. The "pee-shy" scene was shot during reshoots; shooting of the Jennifer Lopez mid-credits scene occurred much later, on November 17, 2025. A week before the film's release, Ice Cube, who starred in the original like Lopez, revealed his involvement.

The film score for Anaconda was composed and produced by American composer David Fleming, who was announced as the project's composer in late 2025. Fleming's score was released digitally by Madison Gate Records on December 25, 2025, alongside the film, and spans approximately 42 minutes across multiple cues that align with key narrative moments, from the opening jungle adventure to humorous character themes. Aldo Arechar, Jake Boring, Forest Christenson, Aniruddh Immaneni, and David Naroth contributed supplementary music and arrangements under Fleming's supervision. In addition to the score, the film features a selection of licensed songs by various artists, including Paula Cole's "I Don't Want to Wait" and AC/DC’s "Back in Black".

== Release ==
=== Theatrical ===
Anaconda premiered at the United Theater on Broadway on December 13, 2025. It was released in the United States on December 25, 2025, by Sony Pictures Releasing.

=== Home media ===
In the United States, Anaconda was released on VOD on January 27, 2026, and on 4K UHD, Blu-ray, and DVD on March 17, by Sony Pictures Home Entertainment. It was released to streaming on Netflix on March 25, 2026. The film reached at number 1 on the chart.

In the United Kingdom, the film was part of the Anaconda series six-movie collection including Lake Placid vs. Anaconda (2015), only available on both Amazon Prime Video and Sky Store.

== Reception ==
=== Box office ===
Anaconda grossed $65.1 million in the United States and Canada, and $70.3 million in other territories, for a worldwide total of $135.4 million.

In the United States and Canada, Anaconda was released alongside Marty Supreme and Song Sung Blue, and was projected to gross around $20 million from 3,509 theaters over its four-day opening weekend. The film made $9.1 million on its first day (which included $2.1 million from Christmas Eve previews). It went on to debut to $14.6 million in its opening weekend, and to a total of $23.7 million over the first four days, finishing in fifth.

=== Critical response ===
On the review aggregator website Rotten Tomatoes, 49% of 160 critics' reviews are positive, with an average rating of 5.3/10. The website's consensus reads: "The premise might be ripe for a raucous action-comedy, but this meta reboot of Anaconda can't detach its jaws wide enough to swallow so many conflicting tones." Metacritic, which uses a weighted average, assigned the film a score of 43 out of 100, based on 33 critics, indicating "mixed or average" reviews. Audiences polled by CinemaScore gave the film an average grade of "B" on an A+ to F scale.

Johnny Oleksinski of the New York Post gave the film a three stars rating out of four and wrote: "Whenever there's a lull here, a big laugh soon comes along with the force of a boa constrictor that conceals the flaws." Ethan Anderton of /Film wrote: "Anaconda taps into a sweet spot that's just edgy enough to make adults laugh and just family friendly enough to let kids have a good time with their parents too. It's hilarious, harmless, and puts a fun spin on a familiar formula, even if the snake still looks fake as hell."

In a more mixed review, Peter Debruge of Variety wrote: "The only risk taken here was asking Sony — plus any surviving members of the original cast — to poke fun at themselves, which only goes so far when the film has no fangs."

== See also ==
- List of killer snake films
- A Breed Apart
