= Harrah =

Harrah or Harrah's may refer to:

== Places ==
- Harrah, Oklahoma, US
- Harrah, Washington, US
- Harrah, Yemen
- Harrah, or Harrat al-Sham, a region of rocky, basaltic desert straddling parts of Syria, Jordan, Israel and Saudi Arabia

== People ==
- Dennis Harrah, a former NFL Offensive Lineman
- Roland Harrah III (1973-1995), American actor
- Toby Harrah, a professional baseball player
- Verna Harrah, philanthropist and film producer, widow of William F. Harrah
- William F. Harrah, founder of Harrah's Entertainment

== Brands and enterprises ==
- Harrah's Entertainment, founded by William F. Harrah, later renamed Caesars Entertainment Corporation
