= Anacondas: The Hunt for the Blood Orchid =

2004 film by Dwight H. Little

- Theatrical release poster
- Directed by: Dwight H. Little
- Screenplay by: John Claflin; Daniel Zelman; Michael Miner; Edward Neumeier
- Story by: Hans Bauer; Jim Cash; Jack Epps Jr.
- Based on: Anaconda by: Hans Bauer; Jim Cash; Jack Epps Jr.
- Produced by: Verna Harrah
- Starring: Johnny Messner; KaDee Strickland; Matthew Marsden; Eugene Byrd; Salli Richardson-Whitfield; Nicholas Gonzalez; Karl Yune; Morris Chestnut
- Cinematography: Stephen F. Windon
- Edited by: Marcus D'Arcy; Mark Warner
- Music by: Nerida Tyson-Chew
- Production companies: Screen Gems; Middle Fork Productions
- Distributed by: Sony Pictures Releasing (Note: Distributed by Sony Pictures Releasing through the Columbia Pictures banner.)
- Release date: August 27, 2004
- Running time: 97 minutes
- Country: United States
- Languages: English; Indonesian
- Budget: $20–25 million
- Box office: $71 million

Anacondas: The Hunt for the Blood Orchid (also known as Anaconda 2) is a 2004 American action adventure horror film directed by Dwight H. Little, with a screenplay by John Claflin, Daniel Zelman, Michael Miner and Edward Neumeier, from a story by Hans Bauer, Jim Cash and Jack Epps Jr., the writers of the film Anaconda (1997). It is a stand-alone sequel to the film and the second installment in the Anaconda film series.

The film stars Johnny Messner, KaDee Strickland, Matthew Marsden, Eugene Byrd, Salli Richardson-Whitfield, Nicholas Gonzalez, Karl Yune and Morris Chestnut. It follows a team of researchers set for an expedition into the Southeast Asian tropical island of Borneo, to search for a sacred flower which they believe will bring humans to a longer and healthier life. They soon become stalked and hunted by the deadly giant anacondas inhabiting the island.

The film was released on August 27, 2004, by Sony Pictures Releasing, and the last film in the series to be released theatrically until 2025. Like its predecessor, the film received mostly negative reviews but was a financial success. A television film sequel Anaconda 3: Offspring, was released in 2008.

== Plot ==
A team of researchers funded by New York pharmaceutical firm Wexel Hall, including Gordon Mitchell, Dr. Jack Byron, Sam Rogers, Gail Stern, Cole Burris, and Dr. Ben Douglas, leave for a jungle in Borneo to search for a flower called "Perrinnia Immortalis" ("Blood Orchid"), that they believe contains a fountain of youth. Jack convinces guide Captain Bill Johnson and his partner Tran Wu to take an unsafe path despite their misgivings. At one point, Gail falls into the water, loses her phone, and is attacked by a crocodile before Bill rescues her. Their boat goes over a waterfall and breaks apart. They call Bill's friend, John Livingston, who lives on the river, to rendezvous with them and pick them up in his boat. While crossing a flooded field, a giant anaconda emerges from the water and swallows Ben. The rest of the team reaches the shore. Bill assures them that it is the largest snake he has ever seen and that it should take weeks for it to grow hungry again. However, most of the team demands that the expedition be called off. Upon making to the meeting point, they find Livingston's boat wrecked and his body in the forest, with evidence he was attacked and killed by another anaconda.

They find an abandoned native village, as well a disemboweled anaconda with the corpse of a native in its stomach. Bill theorizes that the multiple anacondas in the area are due to a nearby female in heat. Several carvings show the anacondas eating the blood orchid. The researchers suspect the orchids are a part of the food chain, and these snakes are larger because they are living longer. Jack realizes the orchids must be nearby, while Gail contends that the orchids may not work on humans. Jack still wants to find the flowers, but the others overrule him and build an escape raft to leave the jungle.

Gordon discovers that Jack has hidden Livingston's radio and gun. The now-psychopathic Jack fails to convince him to continue with the expedition, so he paralyzes Gordon using a previously collected spider to stop him from informing the others. Jack joins the others at the raft, but Sam is suspicious and discovers Gordon and the spider bite. An anaconda swallows Gordon alive as she informs the others, who arrive too late to save him. Bill sets the building on fire in an attempt to kill the snake but it flees. Jack, left alone, steals the raft.

Unable to make another raft, they hack through the jungle to beat Jack to the orchids and retrieve their raft. On the way, they fall into a cave, trying to escape an anaconda. Cole gets lost and finds human skeletons. He is found by Tran, who then gets pulled under the water and eaten. Bill finds Tran's lost flashlight floating in bloody water. A terrified Cole escapes from the cave seconds ahead of the snake, which gets stuck in the hole. Sam beheads it with a machete, but another snake captures the hysterical Cole. The team finds him being constricted. Bill kills the snake with a knife, freeing Cole.

The group finds Jack and the raft. Jack shoots Bill in the arm to keep him from attacking and forces the party to accompany him to the orchids, which grow above a pit where a ball of male anacondas mate with the female. Jack forces Sam at gunpoint to cross the pit via a thin log to fill a backpack with orchids. As she returns, the log begins to crack. Jack orders her to throw him the backpack. Sam threatens to drop the flowers into the pit, but Jack threatens to shoot the others. The log breaks, causing Sam to drop the backpack. As the others try to reach Sam, Jack goes for the backpack. The spider he used earlier escapes from its jar and bites him. Paralyzed, Jack falls into the pit and is devoured. The vine holding Sam also gives way, but she climbs out of the pit as the female anaconda chases her. Gail tricks the snake into biting their fuel container. Cole shoots a flare gun at the gasoline-covered anaconda, immolating it and causing it to fall back into the pit where it explodes, killing the other snakes. The ensuing landslide buries the blood orchids. The survivors—Bill, Sam, Gail, and Cole—return to the raft and head to Kota Bharu. (Note: A fictional version of Kota Kinabalu located in Borneo.)

== Cast ==
- Johnny Messner as Bill Johnson
- KaDee Strickland as Sam Rogers
- Matthew Marsden as Dr. Jack Byron
- Salli Richardson-Whitfield as Gail Stern
- Eugene Byrd as Cole Burris
- Morris Chestnut as Gordon Mitchell
- Karl Yune as Tran Wu
- Nicholas Gonzalez as Dr. Ben Douglas
- Andy Anderson as John Livingston
- Nicholas Hope as Christian Van Dyke
- Peter Curtin as Lawyer
- Denis Arndt as CEO
- Andre Tandjung as Bartender
- Khoa Do as Lead Lopak Hunter
- Aireti as Lopak Hunter

== Production ==
In October 1999, it was reported that Verna Harrah and Middle Fork Productions were in development on a sequel for Anaconda. In November 2000, Anaconda 2 was being written by Rudy Gaines with the intention of being released some time in 2001 with original stars Jennifer Lopez and Ice Cube not expected to return due to their salaries having tripled since the first film's release. In June 2001, it was reported that Michael Miner and Edward Neumeier had been hired to write a new screenplay for the sequel. In January 2003, it was reported that Dwight H. Little was in negotiations to direct and that John Claflin and Daniel Zelman would be rewriting Miner and Neumeier's draft.

The film takes place in Borneo, in reality anacondas are native to South America, not Asia.

== Music ==
The soundtrack for the film was composed by Nerida Tyson-Chew and released by Varèse Sarabande.

== Reception ==
=== Box office ===
Anacondas: The Hunt for the Blood Orchid debuted at second place in the box office, earned $32.2 million in the United States and an international gross of $38.8 million, bringing a worldwide total of $71 million, making it the lowest-grossing film in the franchise.

=== Critical response ===
On the review aggregator website Rotten Tomatoes, 26% of 120 critics' reviews are positive, with an average rating of 4.2/10. The website's consensus reads: "A cheesy monster B-movie." Metacritic, which uses a weighted average, assigned the film a score of 40 out of 100, based on 28 critics, indicating "mixed or average" reviews.

Roger Ebert awarded the film two out of four stars, a rating less than that he gave the original film. Ebert praised Matthew Marsden's performance as being "suitably treacherous". Keith Philipps of The A.V. Club criticized the movie for its CGI snakes, while The Oregonian's Karen Karbo said it never "takes itself too seriously". Audiences polled by CinemaScore gave the film an average grade of "B" on an A+ to F scale.

=== Accolades ===
Year	Award	Category	Nominee	Result	Ref.
2005	APRA Music Awards	Best Soundtrack Album	Nerida Tyson-Chew	Nominated	
2005	Golden Raspberry Awards	Worst Remake or Sequel	Anacondas: The Hunt for the Blood Orchid	Nominated	

== Home media ==
Anacondas: The Hunt for the Blood Orchid was released on DVD on December 21, 2004.

== Sequel ==
A sequel titled Anaconda 3: Offspring, was released in 2008.

== See also ==
- List of killer snake films
