= Anacondas: Trail of Blood =

2009 film by Don E. FauntLeRoy

- DVD cover
- Written by: David Olson
- Directed by: Don E. FauntLeRoy
- Starring: Crystal Allen; Linden Ashby; Danny Midwinter; John Rhys-Davies
- Music by: Peter Meisner
- Country of origin: United States
- Original language: English

Production
- Producer: Alison Semenza
- Cinematography: Don E. FauntLeRoy
- Running time: 89 minutes
- Production companies: Stage 6 Films; Hollywood Media Bridge

Original release
- Network: Sci Fi
- Release: February 28, 2009

Related
- Anaconda 3: Offspring (2008); Lake Placid vs. Anaconda (2015)

Anacondas: Trail of Blood is a 2009 American horror thriller television film directed by Don E. FauntLeRoy and starring Crystal Allen, Linden Ashby, Danny Midwinter, and John Rhys-Davies. The film is a sequel to Anaconda 3: Offspring (2008) and the fourth installment in the Anaconda film series. It premiered on Sci Fi on February 28, 2009.

It was followed by a crossover sequel with the Lake Placid film series, Lake Placid vs. Anaconda was released in 2015.

== Plot ==
A baby anaconda (Note: Captured at the end of the previous film.) is being used for experiments by Peter Reysner, who creates a hybrid of the blood orchids from Borneo (Note: As depicted in Anacondas: The Hunt for the Blood Orchid.) that enabled the anaconda to grow large and live longer, and creates a serum for cell regeneration. After the test seemingly works for the baby anaconda to regenerate, Peter burns it. When he disappears, the long anaconda escapes from the cage and kills Peter in a mine filled with blood orchids. Peter "J.D." Murdoch, a billionaire suffering from bone cancer, sends his assassin Eugene and his team of henchmen mercenaries to find Peter and the serum so that it can cure him. Dr. Amanda Hayes, the sole survivor of the previous snake attack, and two officers also go in search of Peter, determined to destroy the serum and kill the snake.

On the way, they meet trekker Alex, who appears lost in the Romanian Carpathians, while doing a paleopathology project. When they discover the blood orchids in the mine, Amanda sets the explosives to destroy them, but she and the group are attacked by the anaconda that seemingly kills both officers. Amanda manages to trick the snake into causing a cave-in that "kills" the snake however as she and Alex attempt to leave the mine, she is knocked unconscious and Alex escapes to get more help. Meanwhile, a group of explorers: Jackson, his girlfriend Heather, Heather's best friend Wendy, and brothers Patrick and Scott, get dragged into the search for the snake. Due to the serum, the anaconda can no longer die without significant damage to its internal organs and regenerates itself from the previous cave-in. Heather falls ill due to a spider bite. The next day, the anaconda attacks the group Murdoch hires, killing one of them. Alex and Amanda regroup after Amanda saves Alex from the snake and they both eventually find the explorers after it attacks and tears off Patrick's arm. Eugene and his henchmen eventually find Hayes and Jackson's group and capture them. When Amanda is uncooperative in their efforts to get information about the serum, Eugene shoots and kills Patrick. During this moment of confusion, Wendy tries to escape and Eugene shoots her dead, which enrages Jackson.

Amanda and Scott are forced to find the serum, and are accompanied by two henchmen of Eugene to find it. Once they find Peter's house, the two find the serum but keep it hidden. The anaconda strikes the house and devours one gunman and, while the other is trying to fight it off, Amanda and Scott escape and discover more of the serum in a shed. Jackie, the other gunman, corners them, but is taken by surprise by Scott. The snake attacks Jackie and he accidentally blows himself up with a grenade while trying to destroy the snake. It then chases Amanda and Scott with Scott sacrificing himself to buy time for Amanda. In an attempt to destroy the snake, Amanda throws a gasoline tank at the snake and blows it up, but the snake regenerates after she flees.

Back at the base camp, Murdoch appears to collect the serum. He is then confronted by Vasile, one of the officers that accompanied Amanda who survived the encounter with the anaconda. Revealed to be his rival for the research, Murdoch orders Eugene to kill him. However, Eugene refuses, revealing that Vasile offered him more money to join forces with him instead. When Vasile orders him to kill Murdoch, Jackson takes the moment of hostility to stab Eugene whose gun accidentally goes off and kills Vasile. The last remaining mercenary, Armon, hears the commotion and is tackled by Jackson. Jackson gets wounded from a bullet and just as Armon is about to kill him, Amanda shoots him to death. Murdoch demands that Amanda give him the serum. After she gives it to him, he allows her and the remaining survivors to leave. As the group leave in the jeep, Murdoch injects himself with the serum and discovers it works, but the snake arrives and rips his head off, realizing the blood orchid serum wouldn't work. Amanda finally destroys the orchids for good in the mines, and the group tries to escape as the anaconda pursues them. Eugene, who survived and has clung to the back of the vehicle, attacks them, determined to get the rest of the serum. Jackson confronts him in the back of the truck after he gets a shot at Amanda's arm. They both fight in the back of the jeep, giving Amanda enough time to kick Eugene out of the car with two grenades in hand. While the snake devours him, the bomb goes off, blowing both Eugene and the snake to ash. As they continue off, the snake is revealed to have regenerated and escapes into the woods.

== Cast ==
- Crystal Allen as Dr. Amanda Hayes
- John Rhys-Davies as Peter "J.D." Murdoch
- Linden Ashby as Jackson
- Ana Ularu as Heather
- Emil Hostina as Eugene
- Danny Midwinter as Scott
- Călin Stanciu as Alex
- Anca Androne as Wendy
- Alexandru Potoceanu as Roland / Patrick
- Claudiu Bleont as Armon
- Dan Badarau as Vasile
- Zoltan Butuc as Peter Reysner
- Cristina Teodorescu as Murdoch's Assistant

== Production ==
The film was shot back-to-back with Anaconda 3: Offspring in Romania (Bucharest, Danube Delta, etc.). When the film was first announced, David Hasselhoff was slated to appear reprising his character of Stephen Hammett from the third film, but he does not appear.

== Reception ==
DVD Verdict rated it 58/100 and called it "hugely boring".

== Crossover ==
A crossover titled Lake Placid vs. Anaconda, was released in 2015.

== See also ==
- List of killer snake films
