= Anaconda 3: Offspring =

2008 American television film

- DVD cover
- Written by: Nicholas Davidoff; David Olson
- Directed by: Don E. FauntLeRoy
- Starring: David Hasselhoff; Crystal Allen; Ryan McCluskey; Patrick Regis; Anthony Green; John Rhys-Davies
- Music by: Peter Meisner
- Countries of origin: United States; Romania
- Original language: English

Production
- Producer: Alison Semenza
- Cinematography: Don E. FauntLeRoy
- Editor: Scott Conrad
- Running time: 91 minutes
- Production companies: Stage 6 Films; Hollywood Media Bridge

Original release
- Network: Sci Fi
- Release: July 26, 2008

Related
- Anacondas: The Hunt for the Blood Orchid (2004); Anacondas: Trail of Blood (2009)

Anaconda 3: Offspring (Note: Titled onscreen as Anaconda III) is a 2008 adventure horror television film directed by Don E. FauntLeRoy and stars David Hasselhoff, Crystal Allen, and John Rhys-Davies. The film is a sequel to Anacondas: The Hunt for the Blood Orchid (2004) and the third installment in the Anaconda film series.

The film premiered on Sci Fi on July 26, 2008. It was followed by Anacondas: Trail of Blood (2009).

== Plot ==
Animal hunter Stephen Hammett leads a team to capture an anaconda from the Amazon River. It is then held at a genetic research facility in Romania owned by Wexel Hall for experimentation where Professor Eric Kane is developing a serum for the Blood Orchid (the one recovered from the fountain after the ruins of the Borneo jungle (Note: As depicted in Anacondas: The Hunt for the Blood Orchid.)). The research project is led by Dr. Amanda Hayes and funded by Peter "J.D." Murdoch, a well-known industrialist. While visiting the facility, Amanda tells Murdoch that the building is ill-equipped to handle the anaconda, which has grown to extraordinary size. Murdoch provokes the anaconda with a large flashlight, causing it to go into a violent frenzy. As Murdoch, his assistant Pinkus and scientist Daryl are about to leave, the anaconda breaks through the enclosure's wall and kills Daryl. As it escapes, it kills many of the people working in the laboratory. Amanda and Kane discover that the anaconda has also freed the queen anaconda. The anaconda soon sneaks up behind them and crushes Kane before it bites his head off. Murdoch calls Hammett to capture both snakes. His team arrives first with Amanda and Pinkus going with them. At a small farm in the middle of the woods, the owner is eaten alive by one of the snakes.

The hunting party arrives later and begin formulating a plan of attack. During the first confrontation with the snake, two of the party are killed: Grozny is stabbed by the anaconda's very sharp tail and Dragosh gets his head bitten off by the snake. The attack also destroys one of the team's vehicles. Hammett arrives and gives the team a lecture on how to kill the snake. As the group splits up, Amanda heads off in the remaining car with two other team members, Victor and Sofia. During the next confrontation with the snake, the anaconda spits acidic venom in Victor's face. The car crashes with Victor dying and Sofia thrown out, breaking her leg in the process. As Amanda tries to leave the car to help her, the snake reappears and devours Sofia. Amanda is rescued by Hammett and both of them escape.

As they regroup, Amanda reluctantly reveals that the queen snake is pregnant and will give birth to more genetically "special" offspring in less than 24 hours. The team wants to call in the military, but Hammett forbids it and threatens Amanda with jail for her role in creating it. In the morning, the party begins searching for the snake, but they only find Sofia's corpse, which the snake had regurgitated. Pinkus is stabbed in the chest by the Dracanaconda and is killed. While Hammett searches for the snake on foot, Amanda and one of the three remaining hunters, Nick, spot the snakes first going into an old factory and follow them in to plant explosives around the building. Before they can finish, the snake attacks Nick as it impales him with its tail. Nick is able to discharge a grenade, killing both himself and the snake. Hammett and his last remaining hunter, Andrei, arrive after hearing the grenade go off. As the two of them meet Amanda inside the factory, Andrei moves to set the charges, but Hammett kills him. Hammett reveals to Amanda that he is working for Murdoch, who wants a live baby anaconda. Inside the building, the queen gives birth. After wounding Hammett, Amanda sets the timer on the explosives and escapes from the building, leaving Hammett to be attacked by the baby snakes while he tries to reach the bomb. Once she is at a safe distance, the explosives detonate, killing Hammett, the queen, and the baby snakes. Afterwards, one of Murdoch's men named Peter Reysner, whom Hammett had called earlier, drives by heading for the factory where he finds one baby snake still alive and delivers the snake to Murdoch. Amanda, sees the car go by as she burns all of her documentation on the snake research before leaving.

== Cast ==
- David Hasselhoff as Stephen Hammett
- Crystal Allen as Dr. Amanda Hayes
- Ryan McCluskey as Pinkus
- Patrick Regis as Nick
- Anthony Green as Captain Grozny
- John Rhys-Davies as Peter "J.D." Murdoch
- Alin Olteanu as Andrei
- Toma Danilă as Victor
- Bogdan Uritescu as Dragosh
- Milhaela Oros as Sofia
- Serban Celea as Professor Eric Kane
- Zoltan Butuc as Peter Reysner
- Cristina Teodorescu as Murdoch's Assistant
- Alin Constantinescu as Darryl
- George Chitu as Little Boy
- Anca Androne as Mother

== Production ==
The film was shot back-to-back with Anacondas: Trail of Blood in Romania (Bucharest, Danube Delta, etc.).

== Reception ==
Similar to many made-for-television sequels, the film received poor reviews for having little to nothing to do with the previous films, poor acting and lack of special effects.

== Sequel ==
A sequel titled Anacondas: Trail of Blood, was released in 2009.

== See also ==
- List of killer snake films
