= Who's Your Daddy? (film) =

2004 film by Andy Fickman

- DVD cover
- Directed by: Andy Fickman
- Screenplay by: Maria Veltre Druse; Jack Sekowski; Andy Fickman
- Story by: Maria Veltre Druse; Jack Sekowski
- Produced by: Verna Harrah
- Starring: Brandon Davis; Kadeem Hardison; Christine Lakin; Ali Landry; Marnette Patterson; Robert Ri'chard; Lin Shaye; Josh Jacobson; Charlie Talbert; William Atherton; Justin Berfield; Robert Torti; Ryan Bittle; Martin Starr; David Varney; Dave Thomas; Colleen Camp; Patsy Kensit
- Cinematography: Nathan Hope
- Edited by: Tim Board; Jeff Canavan; Scott Conrad
- Music by: Nathan Wang
- Production company: Middle Fork Productions
- Distributed by: Screen Media
- Release date: 2002
- Running time: 109 minutes 111 minutes (unrated)
- Country: United States
- Language: English
- Box office: $5,713,425

Who's Your Daddy? is a 2002 American comedy film written and directed by Andy Fickman.

== Synopsis ==
Chris Hughes (Brandon Davis), a geeky Ohio high school senior raised by his strictly religious adoptive parents (Dave Thomas) and Beverly Hughes (Colleen Camp), discovers that his recently deceased birth parents are the proprietors of a vast pornography empire and he is the heir. Suddenly famous and dropped into a bitter power struggle, his new flock of beautiful co-workers come to his aid.

== Production and release ==
The film's producers intended for Who's Your Daddy? to capitalize on the start of the 21st century's teenage sex comedy revival, as spearheaded by 1999's American Pie.

Fickman shot the film in 2001, but after an unsuccessful test-screening process in 2002, the film was shelved for a number of years. Unreleased theatrically in North America, Who's Your Daddy? finally reached US audiences on DVD in January 2005, followed by a short run in Icelandic cinemas the following summer.
