= Grant Goodeve =

American actor

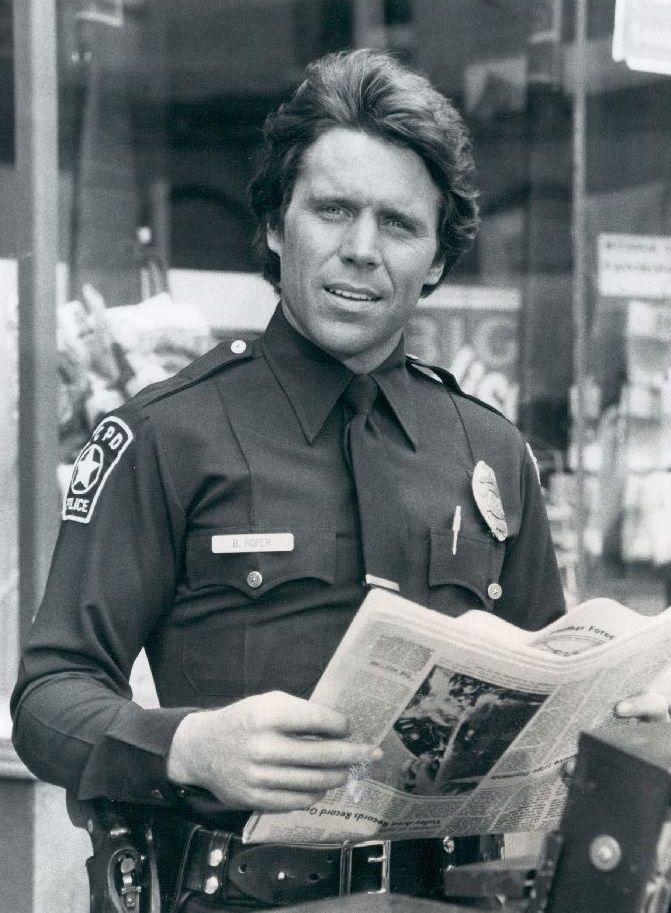
- Goodeve on T. J. Hooker in 1983
- Born: July 6, 1952 (age 73); Middlebury, Connecticut, U.S.
- Occupations: Actor, television host
- Years active: 1976–present
- Known for: David Bradford in Eight Is Enough, Engineer in Team Fortress 2
- Spouse: Deborah Lynn Ketcham (m. 1978)
- Children: 3

Grant Goodeve (born July 6, 1952) is an American actor and television host. He is best known for his role as David Bradford, the eldest son on ABC television's Eight Is Enough from 1977 to 1981; he sang the theme song for the show, as well. More recent work includes stints on the Home & Garden Television cable channel, and voice roles such as the Engineer in the multiplayer video game Team Fortress 2, and Wolf O'Donnell in Star Fox: Assault.

== Early life, family and education ==
Goodeve was born in Middlebury, Connecticut, and moved to Los Angeles, California, in 1975. His sister is the writer Thyrza Nichols Goodeve.

== Career ==
His earliest role was on a fifth-season episode of Emergency! After a February 1977 screen test, he signed on as a cast member of Eight Is Enough, taking over a role played in the series' pilot episode by Mark Hamill.

When Eight Is Enough ended in 1981, Goodeve appeared in guest roles in series such as The Love Boat, T. J. Hooker, Dynasty, and Fantasy Island, among others. In 1983, he played a role in the television pilot The Night Watchman. In the summer of 1984, Goodeve hosted the syndicated program Solid Gold Hits. In 1985–86, he played Michael James "Woody" Woodward on the ABC soap opera One Life to Live. In 1984 he co-starred in the television film Off Sides (Pigs vs. Freaks). He also made a number of appearances as a celebrity guest contestant on the Pyramid game shows in the late 1970s and 1980s.

He reprised his Eight Is Enough role in two reunion movies during the late 1980s, and also appeared in several episodes of Murder, She Wrote. As the 1990s came to a close, he made an appearance on the WB's hit series 7th Heaven as Captain Jack Smith. In 2000, Goodeve appeared as the host of Word Pictures' production Proving the Bible through Archeology.

Goodeve moved to the Pacific Northwest in 1989 with his wife and three children. Soon after, he began appearing in the recurring role of Rick Pedersen, an ill-fated bush pilot, on the CBS series Northern Exposure. He also began contributing to KING-TV's Evening Magazine, and began hosting that station's travel show Northwest Backroads in 1998. As of 2014, Goodeve had hosted it for 16 years.

From 2000 to 2004, he hosted If Walls Could Talk and Homes of Our Heritage on Home & Garden Television. He has worked as a voice actor for several video games, including the role of Wolf O'Donnell in Star Fox: Assault, the Engineer in Team Fortress 2, and various voices for F.E.A.R.. He also lent his singing voice to Bob Rivers' Twisted Christmas series of holiday CDs.

In 2006, Goodeve appeared as George Bailey in Seattle's Taproot Theatre Company's production of It's a Wonderful Life: A Live Radio Play. He returned to the Taproot stage in 2008's production of The Christmas Foundling as Old Jake.

Goodeve also appears in an Amtrak Cascades safety video.

== Personal life ==
Goodeve is active in his Presbyterian church in Seattle, engaging part-time in an itinerant music ministry in the region.

== Filmography ==
=== TV series ===
Year	Title	Role	Notes
1976	Emergency!	Larry	Above and Beyond... Nearly (Season 5: Episode 18)
1976	Gibbsville	Danny	Saturday Night (Season 1: Episode 2)
1977−1981	Eight Is Enough	David Bradford	Series regular
1977, 1982	Insight	Bill	I Want to Die; Leave Me Alone, God
1978–1983	The Love Boat	Various	various roles
1979, 1984	Fantasy Island	Bill Rawlings/Hunter Richter	Goose for the Gander/The Stuntman (Season 3: Episode 2); Sing Melancholy Baby/The Last Dogfight (Season 7: Episode 16)
1981	Aloha Paradise		Alex and Annie/Blue Honeymoon/Another Thing (Season 1: Episode 1)
1982	Darkroom	Steve Lambert	Who's There? (Season 1: Episode 15)
1983	T. J. Hooker	Officer Bill Roper	Blue Murder (Season 3: Episode 10)
1983	The Night Watchman	Officer Phil Triola	TV Pilot
1983–1987	Dynasty	Chris Deegan	7 episodes
1984	Solid Gold Hits	Host	
1984	Trapper John, M.D.	David Huber	A Little Knife Music (Season 5: Episode 14)
1984	Finder of Lost Loves	Stuart Scranton	A Gift (Season 1: Episode 10)
1984	Capitol	Jordy Clegg #2	
1984–1988	Murder, She Wrote	Ben Skyler/Jack Kowalski/Larry Gaynes	3 episodes
1985	Rituals	Dr. Coleman	
1985–1986	One Life to Live	James Woodward	
1986	Hotel	Kevin Bromley	Enemies Within (Season 4: Episode 3)
1990–1992	Northern Exposure	Rick Pederson/Rick	10 episodes
1992	McGee and Me!	Brad 'Giff' Gifford	In the Nick of Time
1999–	Northwest Backroads	Host	
2002	7th Heaven	Captain Jack Smith	Monkey Business 1 (Season 7: Episode 1); Monkey Business Deux (Season 7: Episode 2)
2000–2004	If Walls Could Talk	Host	
2017	Twin Peaks	Walter Lawford	2 episodes

=== Films ===
Year	Title	Role	Notes
1976	Law of the Land	Soldier	TV movie
1977	All the King's Horses	Jack Benson	
1979	A Last Cry for Help	Jeff Burgess	TV movie
1979	Hot Rod	Sonny Munn	TV movie
1982	High Powder	Sgt. Garvey	TV movie
1984	Pigs vs. Freaks	Neal Brockmeyer	TV movie
1987	Eight Is Enough: A Family Reunion	David Bradford	TV movie
1988	Take Two	Barry Griffith/Frank Bentley	
1988	License to Drive	Natalie's DMV Examiner	feature film
1989	An Eight Is Enough Wedding	David Bradford	TV movie
1990	She'll Take Romance	Doug	TV movie
1996	Pandora's Clock	Don Moses	TV movie
2000	Something to Sing About	Russ	TV movie
2008	Proud American	Naval Doctor	
2009	Crimes of the Past	Agent Kruch	
2017	The Case for Christ	Mr. Cook	
2018	County Line	Sheriff Preston	
2021	Christmas in the Pines	Duke Henderson	TV movie

=== Video games ===
Year	Title	Role	Notes
2005	Star Fox: Assault	Wolf O'Donnell	voice: English version
2005	F.E.A.R.	Harlan Wade/Additional Voices	voice
2007	Team Fortress 2	Engineer	voice
2009	F.E.A.R. 2: Project Origin	Harlan Wade	voice
2011	F.E.A.R. 3	Harlan Wade	voice
2016	Paladins	Team Fortress 2 Barik	voice

== Discography ==
- The Wonder of It All (1996)
