= Anthony Green (actor) =

British thespian (born 1970)

- Born: 4 April 1970 (age 56); Blackburn, Lancashire, England
- Occupation: Actor

Anthony Green (born 4 April 1970) is a British actor known for playing Station Officer Mick Callaghan in series 14 of London's Burning.

== Early life ==
Green was born in Blackburn, Lancashire, England. He began acting at the age of 6, playing The Wizard in The Wizard of Oz at Daisyfield Primary School. At St. Mary's College, Blackburn, he played Oscar Lindquist in Sweet Charity.

He continued to act while studying law at the University of Nottingham, playing John Proctor in The Crucible, Jimmy Porter in Look Back in Anger and I in a stage adaptation of Withnail and I. At the Edinburgh Fringe Festival he played Sheriff Baldwin Rawel in Richard Davidson's Storybook which won a Fringe First and was nominated for the Independent Theatre Award.

== Career ==
In film, he played the leading role of Jonathan Berkoff, opposite Emily Lloyd, in the independent British feature The Honeytrap. He played parts in The Bourne Identity and the James Bond film Tomorrow Never Dies.He took the central role of Michael, in Amit Gupta's short film Love Story about a man's journey to find true love. It was shown at a number of film festivals across the United States and Europe and won the Verizon Audience Award at the Indo-American Arts Festival in New York.

He has played lead roles in two American TV movies: Grozny, in Sony Pictures' Anaconda 3: Offspring, which co-stars David Hasselhoff and Crystal Allen, and pirate Israel Hands in Hallmark's Blackbeard, which features Angus Macfadyen in the title role.

He played series regular lead roles in the PBS/Carlton co-production of Cadfael, playing Lord Hugh Beringar, opposite Derek Jacobi, and in the A&E/BBC co-production of The Scarlet Pimpernel, playing Sir Andrew Foulkes, opposite Richard E. Grant. He was Station Officer Mick Callaghan in the series finale of London's Burning, and DCI Be199lmarsh in Beech is Back, a special series of The Bill.

Television guest leads include If...The Oil Runs Out, Where the Heart Is (Series I and VII), Big Bad World, Wycliffe, and Wing and a Prayer. In Bonekickers he portrayed a fictional Roman character Marcus Quintanus opposite Shauna Macdonald's non-fictional Boudica. Both actors played their parts in Latin.

== Filmography ==
=== Film ===
Year	Title	Role	Notes
1997	Tomorrow Never Dies	Firing Officer – HMS Chester	
2002	The Honeytrap	Jonathan Berkoff	
2002	The Bourne Identity	Security Chief	

=== Television ===
Year	Title	Role	Notes
1997	Wycliffe	John Leigh	Episode: "Strangers Home"
1997	Pie in the Sky	Club Barman	Episode: "In the Smoke"
1997	Wing and a Prayer	P.C. Chandler	Episode: "A Sense of Belonging"
1997	Beyond Fear	Police Constable	Television film
1998	Cadfael	Hugh Beringar	3 episodes
1999	Big Bad World	Miles	Episode: "What's Wrong with Bees?"
1999	The Scarlet Pimpernel	Sir Andrew Ffoulkes	3 episodes
1999, 2003	Where the Heart Is	Ed Pickering / Charlie	2 episodes
2000, 2014	Doctors	Brian Fretwell / Insp. Bernie Lyle	2 episodes
2001	Perfect Strangers	Doctor	Miniseries
2001	Beech is Back	DCI Andrew Belmarsh	6 episodes
2001	Judge John Deed	David Crutwell	Episode: "Appropriate Response"
2002	London's Burning	Mick Callaghan	8 episodes
2003	Single	Richard	Episode #1.3
2006	If...	Nick	Episode: "If... The Oil Runs Out"
2006	Blackbeard	Israel Hands	3 episodes
2008	Bonekickers	Marcus Quintanus	Episode: "The Eternal Fire"
2008	Anaconda 3: Offspring	Captain Grozny	Television film
2010	The Bill	James Barclay	Episode: "Crossing the Line"
2012	The Last Weekend	John McCloud	Episode: "Sunday/Monday"
2012	Casualty	Gray Eldon	Episode: "I'll See You in My Dreams"

=== Video games ===
Year	Title	Role	Notes
2003	Armed and Dangerous	Peasant Boy / Peasant Man 2	
2006	S.T.A.L.K.E.R.: Shadow of Chernobyl	The Stalker	
