= Tamara (2005 film) =

2005 film by Jeremy Haft

- Theatrical release poster
- Directed by: Jeremy Haft
- Written by: Jeffrey Reddick
- Produced by: Danny Fisher; Chris Sievernich; Matt Milich; Martin Wiley
- Starring: Jenna Dewan; Matthew Marsden; Chad Faust; Gil Hacohen; Katie Stuart
- Cinematography: Scott Kevan
- Edited by: Eric Strand
- Music by: Michael Suby
- Production companies: Armada Pictures; Lions Gate Films; Integrated Films
- Distributed by: City Lights Pictures Releasing
- Release dates: October 23, 2005 (New York City Horror Film Festival); February 3, 2006 (United States)
- Running time: 94 minutes
- Country: United States
- Language: English
- Budget: $3.5 million
- Box office: $206,871

Tamara is a 2005 American supernatural horror film directed by Jeremy Haft and starring Jenna Dewan, Matthew Marsden, Chad Faust, Gil Hacohen, and Katie Stuart. It was released in select theatres in the United States by City Lights Pictures, a Manhattan-based production company.

== Plot ==
Tamara Riley is a shy, lonely teenager who lives with her alcoholic and verbally abusive father after her mother has left. She is an excellent student but an outcast among her peers, and is often bullied for her appearance. She is infatuated with Bill Natolly, her handsome English teacher. After a critical article she writes about the school's athletes taking performance-enhancing drugs is published in the school's newspaper, two of the star athletes, Shawn and Patrick, harass her and threaten revenge. Bill comforts her, and she attempts to kiss him, but he politely discourages her affections. Tamara attempts to perform a magical ritual to bind her fate to that of Bill, but when she must spill her own blood, she ceases the ritual.

That night, Shawn and Patrick orchestrate a prank along with Shawn's girlfriend, Kisha. Shawn calls Tamara, impersonating Bill, and invites her to a motel room, where a video camera is placed. Shawn, Patrick, and Kisha watch as Tamara undresses, along with three others—Chloe, Jesse, and Roger—who did not know about the prank. Shawn barges in and taunts Tamara, and she is accidentally killed in a struggle. Despite Chloe's demands that they inform the police, she is blackmailed into helping bury Tamara.

They are shocked when Tamara walks into class at a later day, appearing beautiful and seductive. They convince themselves that she was only unconscious and dug her way out of the ground. While Roger is watching a film in the school audiovisual room, the image on the screen suddenly changes to the video of Tamara's murder. Roger removes the tape and is confronted by Tamara, who torments him with hallucinations of what it is like to be buried alive and with his history of self-harm. He then sends a televised message to the entire school in which he proclaims that one should "hear no evil, speak no evil, and see no evil". He cuts off his ear and tongue with a razor blade, then fatally stabs himself in the eye.

Tamara visits the home of Bill, intending to seduce him. When he resists her, she says that "it is only a matter of time". The next day, she visits the school counselor and Bill's wife, Alison. Tamara confronts Alison, mentioning Alison and Bill's infertility problems. Realizing that her father fantasizes about having sex with her and that his alcoholism drove her mother away, Tamara commands him to eat a beer bottle.

At a party, Tamara places a spell on Shawn and Patrick, forcing them to have sex with each other. Kisha attempts to stop Tamara, but Tamara enchants Kisha—who has an eating disorder—to eat herself into a stupor, before Kisha is taken away by Jesse and Chloe. When Chloe and Jesse call Bill to tell him about what happened, Kisha—still under the spell—calls Tamara and tells her that Bill knows. Kisha is knocked out by Chloe.

Chloe, Jesse, and Bill go to Tamara's house, where they find a spellbook describing the ritual she tried to perform. They realize that when Tamara was killed, her blood was spilled, which completed the ritual and allowed her to rise from the grave and control others through touch. Tamara, learning of what the others know, sends Shawn and Patrick to the Natolly residence to kill Alison, but she kills them both in self-defense. Kisha and Alison are both hospitalized, but Kisha wakes up and chases down Jesse and Chloe. Kisha stabs Jesse to death with a carving knife before Chloe knocks her out again with a pizza paddle.

Tamara controls the mind of an armed security guard and chases Bill, Allison, and Chloe up to the rooftop of the hospital. Tamara attempts to control Chloe but sees through her memories that Chloe actually cared about her and realizes that she has become a monster. She breaks down and slowly changes back into a corpse. Before fading away, Tamara asserts her will to be with Bill. He holds Tamara close and kisses her, then throws himself off the roof with Tamara, killing them both. Kisha, seemingly still under Tamara's spell, takes the spellbook from Chloe's Jeep.

== Cast ==
- Jenna Dewan as Tamara Riley
- Katie Stuart as Chloe
- Matthew Marsden as Bill Natolly, Alison's husband and Tamara's teacher
- Claudette Mink as Alison Natolly, Bill's wife
- Chad Faust as Jesse
- Bryan Clark as Shawn
- Melissa Elias as Kisha
- Marc Devigne as Roger
- Gil Hacohen as Patrick
- Chris Sigurdson as Mr. Riley, Tamara's father

== Reception ==
=== Box office ===
Tamara was released to US theaters on February 3, 2006. It averaged $2,084 at 14 theatres, for a weekend gross of $29,157. It was in US cinemas for 13 weeks, and finished with a gross of $206,871.

=== Critical response ===
Tamara received mostly negative reviews from critics. On the review aggregator website Rotten Tomatoes, the film holds an approval rating of 32% based on 28 reviews, with an average rating of 4.4/10. The website's critics consensus reads, "Resolutely misguided without ever really crossing into 'so bad it's good' territory, Tamara lacks even the cheap thrills promised by its premise." Metacritic, which uses a weighted average, assigned the film a score of 34 out of 100, based on 10 critics, indicating "generally unfavorable" reviews.

Nathan Lee of The New York Times noted its low budget and its "even lower ambitions", but acknowledged that it had "one genuine, if unintentional, surprise." Awarding it one of four stars, Slant grappled with the film's "insufficient imaginativeness" and forced "theme of duality." Maitland McDonagh, a critic specialist in horror films, wrote that Tamara "panders to horror buffs" and "squanders the efforts of a competent cast", calling it a "rehash of Carrie", and awarding it two of five stars. Jessica Reeves of the Chicago Tribune was even more critical, describing the film as "dismal, depressing, embarrassing and utterly lacking in any artistic or social worth".

Frank Scheck, writing for The Hollywood Reporter, provided a mixed review and confessed that "the film has its dubious pleasures".
