= Matthew Marsden =

English and American actor

- Born: 1972 or 1973 (age 53–54); West Bromwich, West Midlands, England
- Citizenship: United Kingdom; United States
- Education: National Youth Theatre
- Occupations: Actor; model; singer; producer
- Years active: 1993–present
- Spouse: Nadine Micallef
- Website: matthewmarsden.com

Matthew Marsden is an English and American actor. He has appeared in films such as Black Hawk Down, Helen of Troy, Anacondas: The Hunt for the Blood Orchid, Tamara, Resident Evil: Extinction, Rambo, Transformers: Revenge of the Fallen, and Atlas Shrugged.

== Early life ==
Marsden was born at Hallam Hospital in West Bromwich, West Midlands, England. He grew up on the Yew Tree Estate in Walsall. His father abandoned the family when Marsden was a child, and his mother Ann then brought him up and his sister alone. He attended Manor High School in Wednesbury, before leaving to go to Dartmouth High School in Great Barr, Birmingham. Marsden went on to study Performing Arts at Middlesex University achieving an associate degree through the National Youth Theatre.

Marsden found work as a model in London, Paris and Milan. He was featured in commercials for products such as Jacobs Coffee, Punica, Vimto and Impulse. He has since commented, "I was at college in London and when you're a struggling student it doesn't take a genius to work out that it's easier to model for a few hours each week and earn thousands of pounds than work in a bar for a pittance. But I hated doing it really." After nearly two years of modelling, he decided to get an agent and find work as an actor.

== Career ==
Marsden's acting break came in 1995 when he joined the cast of the ITV soap opera Emmerdale, playing the upper crust Daniel Weir, lover of Linda Glover. He remained in the role for three months before the character was written out. He went on to play the role of surfer Philip Kennedy in Island – a Jersey-based ITV miniseries. Marsden also dressed in drag when he appeared in the Jeannot Szwarc French film Les Soeurs Soleil (The Sun Sisters).

On 3 March 1997, he joined the cast of Coronation Street as mechanic Chris Collins and he remained with the series until 29 March 1998. The role earned him 1997 National Television Award for Most Popular Newcomer. Following his departure from Coronation Street, Marsden decided on a change of direction and a fleeting career as a pop star followed. He signed a £500,000 record deal with Columbia Records and released his debut single in July 1998 called "The Heart's Lone Desire", which reached number 13 in the UK Singles Chart. He followed with a second single, a cover of Hall & Oates' "She's Gone", with his label-mates Destiny's Child providing backing vocals, which reached number 24 in the UK Singles Chart.

Marsden returned to acting, portraying Paris in the USA Network mini-series Helen of Troy and Army Ranger Dale Sizemore in Ridley Scott's film Black Hawk Down. He starred in John Irvin's feature Shiner, Anacondas: The Hunt for the Blood Orchid (the sequel to Anaconda) and Tamara, a supernatural thriller by Final Destination screenwriter Jeffrey Reddick. He made appearances in the films DOA: Dead or Alive and Resident Evil: Extinction. He co-starred in Rambo (2008) and Transformers: Revenge of the Fallen.

== Personal life ==
Marsden is married to Nadine Micallef.

Marsden is a practising Catholic. He appeared in Rosary Stars Praying the Gospel (2009). He and his family are frequently involved in activities with Family Theater Productions, a division of Holy Cross Family Ministries, founded by Fr Patrick Peyton.

Marsden is a fan of the football club West Bromwich Albion.

In 2020, Marsden announced that he had become a U.S. citizen.

He is an active supporter of conservative politics in the United States, and is publicly aligned with the anti-vaccine movement. He has also expressed his doubts about the reality of climate change and taken a strong anti-immigration position for the UK and called for "a complete halt to immigration and deportations on a massive scale". He has also stated he supports the reintroduction of public hangings in the UK .

== Filmography ==
=== Film ===
Year	Title	Role	Notes
1993	The Young Americans	Mayfair Party	Uncredited
1997	Les Soeurs Soleil	Lawrence	Credited as Mattew Marsden
2000	Shiner	Eddie "Golden Boy" Simpson	
2001	Black Hawk Down	Specialist Dale Adonis Sizemore	
2004	Anacondas: The Hunt for the Blood Orchid	Dr. Jack Byron	
2005	Tamara	Bill Natolly	
2006	DOA: Dead or Alive	Maximilian Marsh	
2007	Resident Evil: Extinction	Slater	
2008	Rambo	"School Boy"	
2009	Transformers: Revenge of the Fallen	Captain Graham	
2010	Eyes to See	Ray	Short film
2011	Atlas Shrugged: Part I	James Taggart	
2011	Henry	Tom	Short film
2013	Bounty Killer	Drifter	
2013	Pupa	Jimmy	Short film
2015	Finding Noah	N/A	as Producer
2016	Apartment 407	Mark	
2016	Dead South	Hildegard Charmington	
2016	Charlie's Gift	Fred Cuellar	Short film
2017	Savage Dog	MI6 Agent Harrison	
2017	S.W.A.T.: Under Siege	Lars Cohaagen	Direct to video
2019	Disappearance	George Belanger	
2019	I Am That Man	John Beckett	Also writer and Director
2020	Tenet	Blue Team Soldier	
2021	Love on the Rock	Halston Hallstrom	
2021	Deadlock	Boon	
2022	A Hui Hou	Blake	

=== Television ===
Year	Title	Role	Notes
1995	Emmerdale	Daniel Weir	22 episodes
1996	Island	Philip Kennedy	Series regular
1997–1998	Coronation Street	Chris Collins	Series regular; 137 episodes
2000	North Square	Stuart Pound	2 episodes; 1 uncredited
2002	Demontown	Marc Tyler	Unaired pilot
2002	The Legacy	Sam Maddux	Unaired pilot
2003	Helen of Troy	Paris	Miniseries
2004	CSI: Miami	Morgan Coleman	Episode: "Addiction"
2006	Emily's Reasons Why Not	Vincent	Episode: "Why Not to Date a Twin"
2007	NCIS	Lieutenant Roy Sanders	Episode: "Dead Man Walking"
2007	Ghost Whisperer	Sergeant Matt Murphy	Episode: "Haunted Hero"
2010	Madso's War	Mike "Madso" Madden	Unaired pilot
2011	Nikita	Voss	Episode: "The Next Seduction"
2012	Two and a Half Men	Nigel	Episodes: "The Duchess of Dull-in-Sack", "Not in My Mouth!"
2015	Castle	Clint Granger	Episode: "The Wrong Stuff"
2022	Reacher	Stan Reacher	5 episodes

== Discography ==
=== Albums ===
Title	Details
Say Who	Released: 1998; MiniDisc – COLUMBIA 492529 8 Additional information Track listing: 1. "The Heart's Lone Desire" (Metropolitan Mix) – 4:19; 2. "Say Who" – 4:36; 3. "Walk My Way" – 4:39; 4. "She's Gone" (featuring Destiny's Child) 4:18; 5. "Fragile Heart" – 4:30; 6. "Talk To Me" – 4:32; 7. "Didn't We Say" – 4:20; 8. "I Still Live For You" – 3:54; 9. "Love's in Need of Love Today" – 4:42; 10. "Be My Baby Tonight" – 3:38; 11. "The Writing's on the Wall" – 3:47; 12. "Lost For Words" – 3:21

=== Singles ===
Year	Single	UK Singles Chart	Album
"The Heart's Lone Desire"	1998	13	Say Who
"She's Gone" (featuring Destiny's Child)	1998	24	Say Who
"Walk My Way"	1999	—	Say Who
"—" denotes a recording that did not chart or was not released in that territory.
