= VF-301 =

Fighter Squadron 301
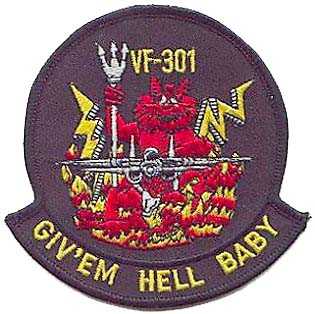
- VF-301 Insignia
- Active: 1 October 1970 – 11 September 1994
- Country: United States
- Allegiance: United States Navy Reserve
- Branch: United States Navy
- Type: Reserve fighter squadron
- Part of: Reserve Carrier Air Wing 30
- Garrison/HQ: Naval Air Station Miramar
- Nickname(s): "Devil's Disciples" "Blazing Infernos"
- Motto(s): Give'em Hell, Baby
- Decorations: Battle "E" awarded period 1 Jan 1987 thru 31 Dec 1987

Aircraft flown
- Fighter: F-8L Crusader; F-4B/N/S Phantom; F-14A Tomcat

Fighter Squadron 301 (VF-301) was an aviation unit of the United States Naval Reserve in service from 1970 to 1994 at Naval Air Station (NAS) Miramar in southern California. The squadron's nickname was Devil's Disciples. In an early display of political correctness, it was changed to Blazing Infernos when the Pope visited Los Angeles in the late 1980s.

== History ==
VF-301 was activated on 1 October 1970 and assigned to Carrier Air Wing Reserve 30 (CVWR-30) (tail code "ND") at Naval Air Station Miramar, California (USA).

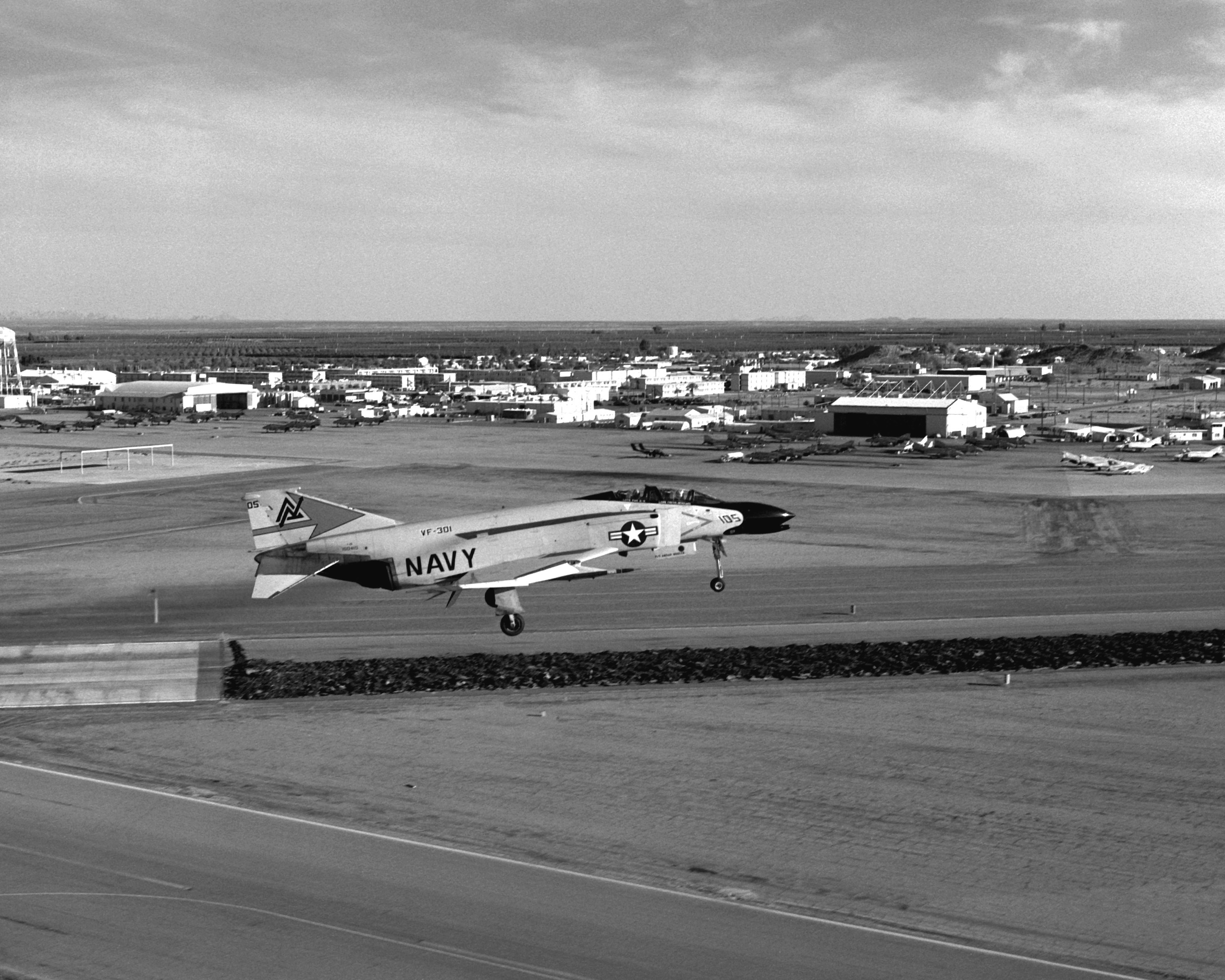
VF-301 F-4N landing at MCAS Yuma.

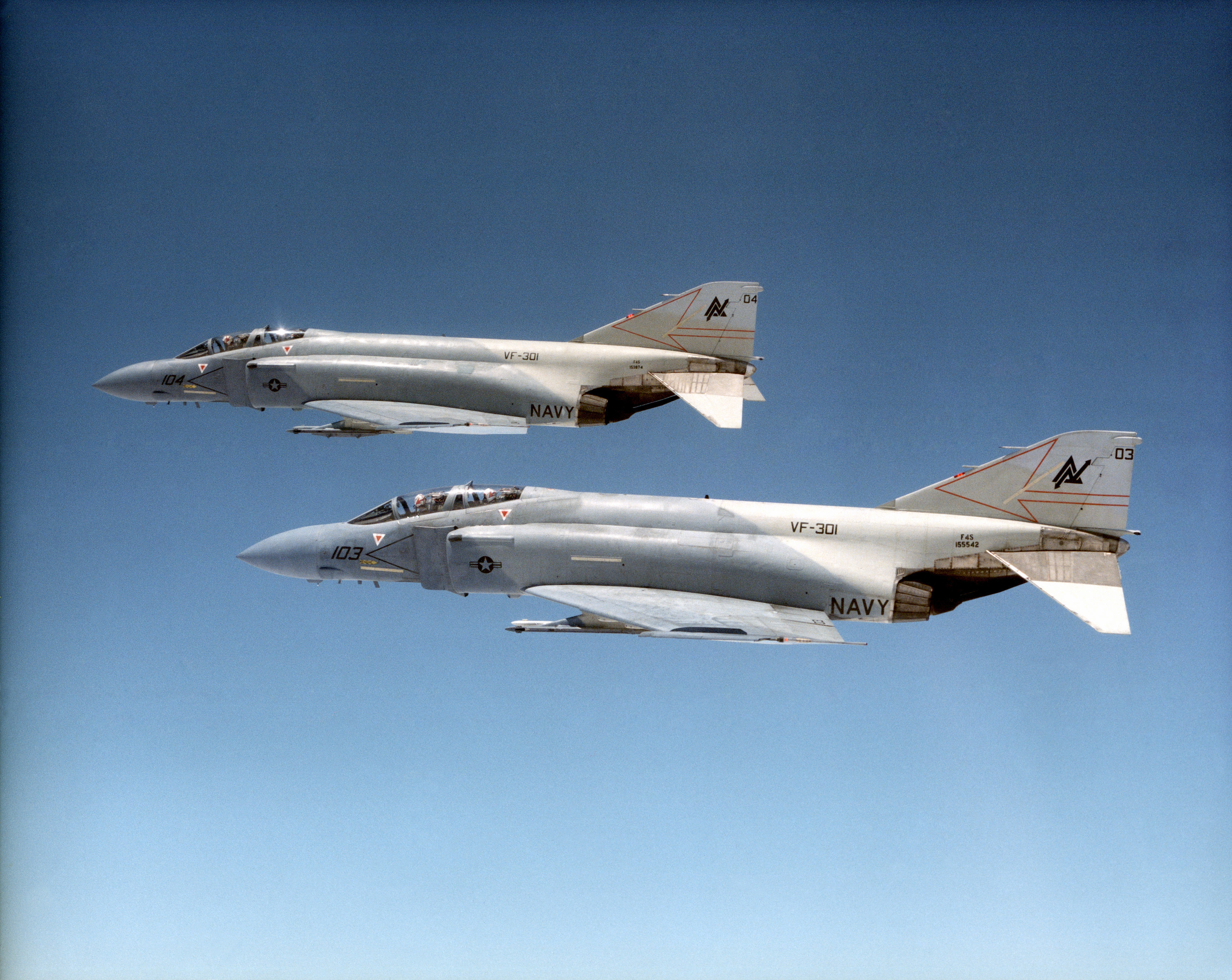
Two VF-301 F-4S

The squadron first flew the F-8L Crusader and later transitioned to the F-4B Phantom in 1974. Their time with the B-models was short and VF-301 soon received the F-4N in February 1975. In 1980, VF-301 received the most advanced F-4 variant in the U.S. Navy, the F-4S. In October 1984, the unit transitioned to the F-14A Tomcat. The squadron made its first deployment with the F-14A on 21 April 1985, with five aircraft visiting MCAS Yuma, Arizona for air-to-air training against U.S. Marine Corps F-21A Kfir fighters of Marine Fighter Training Squadron 401 (VMFT-401). At this time, the squadron was still transitioning to the F-14, and it was not until 4 August of the same year that the entire squadron was able to deploy to NAS Fallon, Nevada for air wing training.

The Devil's Disciples' first carrier landings were on board the USS Ranger. Further carrier training was limited but did include time on board the USS Enterprise between 10 and 22 August 1988. Later in its life, the squadron became the first Naval Air Reserve squadron to drop air-to-ground ordnance, specifically Mk 84 bombs and Mk 20 cluster munitions.

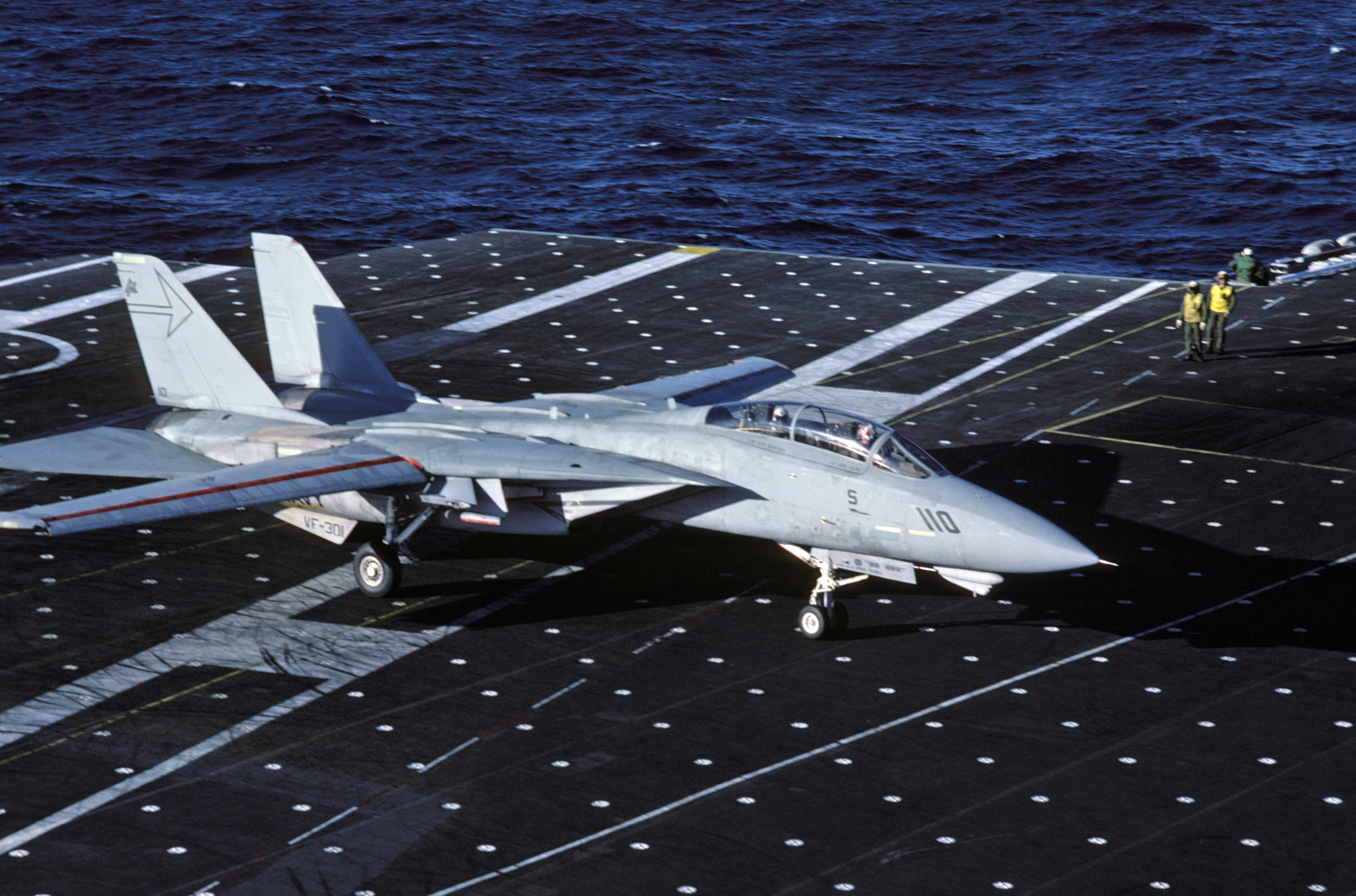
VF-301 F-14A on USS Constellation (CV-64) in 1987

After 24 years of service, VF-301 was disestablished on 11 September 1994, the same time as its sister squadron VF-302, due to post-Cold War budget cuts where the Navy opted to sacrifice Reserve F-14 squadrons to keep Regular Navy F-14 squadrons operating. Deactivation of the rest of the CVWR-30 was soon to follow. During these 24 years, VF-301 had acquired an outstanding safety record, flying 71,322.4 hours without a Class A mishap, setting a new record for Navy tactical jet squadrons.

== See also ==
- History of the United States Navy
- List of inactive United States Navy aircraft squadrons
- List of United States Navy aircraft squadrons
