= Shiner (2000 film) =

- Original theatrical poster
- Directed by: John Irvin
- Written by: Scott Cherry
- Produced by: Geoffrey Reeve; Jim Reeve; Barry Townsley
- Starring: Michael Caine; Martin Landau; Frances Barber; Frank Harper; Andy Serkis; Matthew Marsden; Kenneth Cranham
- Cinematography: Mike Molloy
- Edited by: Ian Crafford
- Music by: Paul Grabowsky
- Production companies: IAC Film; Wisecroft Limited; VisionView
- Distributed by: Momentum Pictures
- Release dates: 22 September 2000 (SSIFF); 14 September 2001 (United Kingdom)
- Running time: 99 minutes
- Country: United Kingdom
- Language: English

Shiner is a 2000 British crime film written by Scott Cherry and directed by John Irvin and starring Michael Caine and Martin Landau. It was shot in London.

== Plot ==
The story centers on Billy "Shiner" Simpson, a boxing promoter banned from legitimate fights until he finds a promising start in his son Eddie. The night of the fight sees Eddie killed, and Simpson suspects rival Frank Spedding. Billy seeks revenge, only to grow mad as his suspicions draw closer to home.

== Cast ==
- Michael Caine as Billy "Shiner" Simpson
- Martin Landau as Frank Spedding
- Frances Barber as Georgie
- Frank Harper as Jeff "Stoney" Stone
- Andy Serkis as Mel
- Matthew Marsden as Eddie "Golden Boy" Simpson
- Kenneth Cranham as Gibson "Gibbo"

== Reception ==
Jane Crowther of the BBC said, "A Lear-like construction serves well to show the gradual unraveling of a ruthlessly ambitious man trading on familial loyalty and past glory."

The score by Paul Grabowsky effectively creates a disturbing and sinister mood.

Shiner has a rating of 46% from 13 reviews on the review aggregator RottenTomatoes, indicating slightly below-average favour.
