= Pete Pettigrew =

United States Navy rear admiral

Kenneth Pettigrew
- Born: 3 February 1942; Glencoe, Illinois
- Died: 23 June 2024 (aged 82)
- Military career
- Allegiance: United States
- Branch: United States Navy
- Service years: 1964–1998
- Rank: Rear admiral
- Nicknames: Pete; Viper
- Commands: VF-302
- Conflicts: Vietnam War
- Awards: Silver Star; Distinguished Flying Cross; Air Medal (3)

Kenneth "Pete" Pettigrew (3 February 1942 – 23 June 2024) was a retired United States Navy rear admiral.

== Career ==
Pettigrew graduated from Stanford University in 1964 with a degree in biological science. He began flight training in December 1964 and graduated in June 1966. He was first assigned to VF-121, the Fleet Replacement Squadron for training on the F-4 Phantom II in the United States Pacific Fleet. He was then assigned to VF-151, aboard the USS Coral Sea which was deployed to Vietnam during the Vietnam War from April 1967 to February 1968. He served a second combat tour from July 1968 to February 1969.

In April 1969, he returned to VF-121 as the senior landing signal officer (LSO). In early 1970 he joined the relatively new United States Navy Fighter Weapons School (TOPGUN) as an air-to-air and air-to-ground instructor.

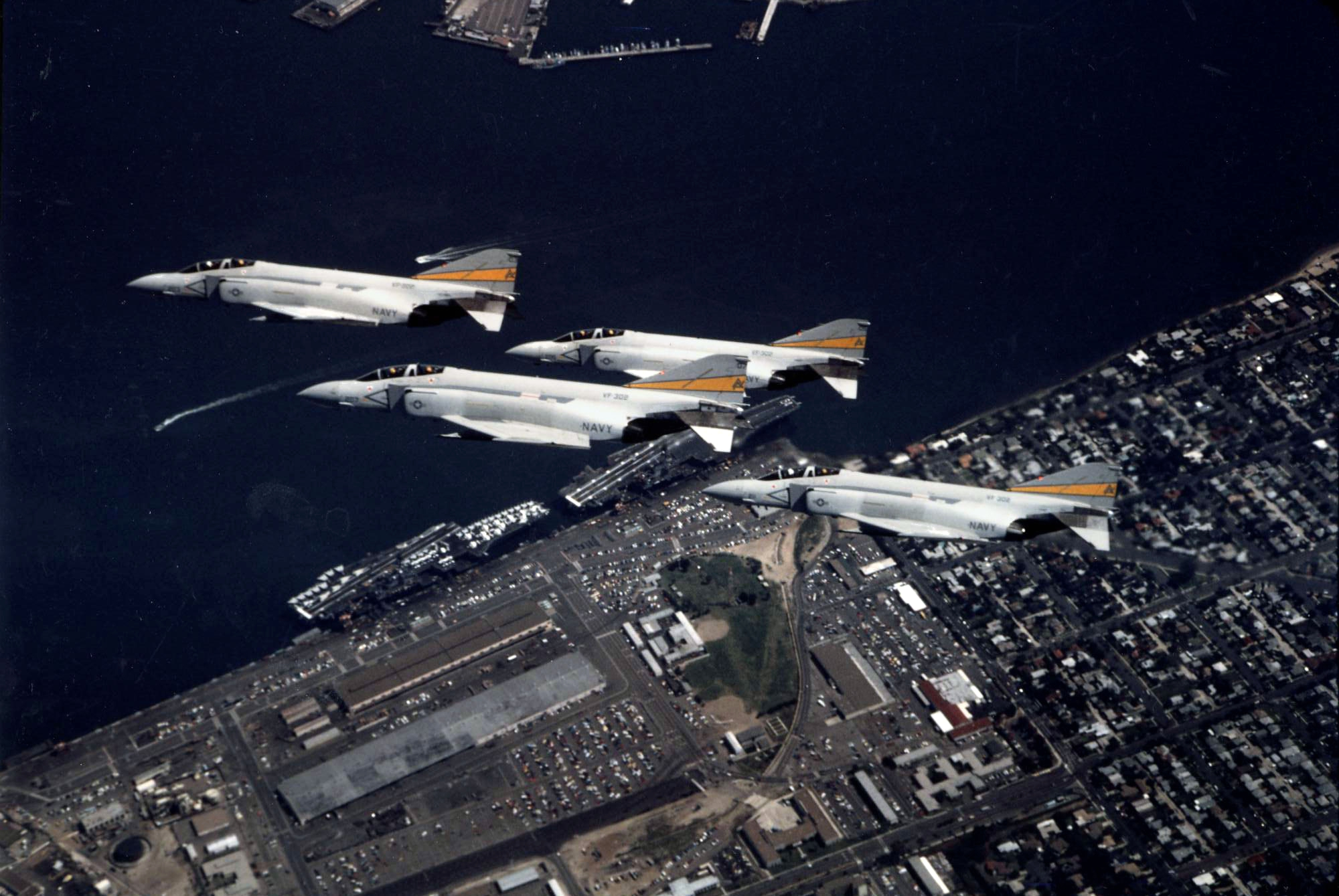
F-4S Phantom IIs of VF-302 in flight over NAS North Island, California on 27 March 1981. Pettigrew piloted the lead aircraft.

In February 1972, he joined Carrier Air Wing Eleven aboard USS Kitty Hawk, as the wing's LSO. On 6 May 1972, while flying a F-4J of VF-114, he and his radar intercept officer LTJG Mike McCabe shot down a Vietnam People's Air Force MiG-21 with an AIM-9 Sidewinder missile.

He resigned from active duty in August 1973, but transferred to the United States Naval Reserve and was there until January 1998. From January 1980 to January 1982, he served as commanding officer of VF-302 at NAS Miramar. After squadron command, he was promoted to captain and later to rear admiral.

== Later career ==
After separating from active duty and transitioning to the Naval Air Reserve, he worked as a pilot for Pacific Southwest Airlines (later US Airways), retiring in 2002.

From 1983 to 1986 he served as a technical consultant for Paramount Pictures on the film Top Gun. He appears briefly in the film as Perry, a colleague of Kelly McGillis' character Charlie. His call sign Viper was used in the film by Tom Skerritt's character Commander Mike "Viper" Metcalf. He was also seen visiting the set of the film's 2022 sequel Top Gun: Maverick. He volunteered numerous hours as a docent onboard USS Midway Museum in San Diego, California.
