= Off Sides (Pigs vs. Freaks) =

1994 American TV film

- Genre: Comedy; Drama; Sport
- Written by: Gordon Dawson
- Story by: Gordon Dawson; Jack Epps Jr.
- Directed by: Dick Lowry
- Starring: Eugene Roche; Grant Goodeve; Tony Randall; Adam Baldwin; Stephen Furst
- Music by: Mark Snow
- Country of origin: United States
- Original language: English

Production
- Executive producers: Greg Strangis; Sam Strangis
- Producer: Jack Epps Jr.
- Production locations: Corvallis, Oregon; Salem, Oregon
- Cinematography: Frank Beascoechea
- Editors: Bill Parker; John Kaufman; Domenic Dimascio
- Running time: 103 minutes
- Production company: Ten-Four Productions

Original release
- Network: NBC
- Release: July 6, 1984

Off Sides (Pigs vs. Freaks) (originally titled Pigs vs. Freaks) is a 1984 American made-for-television sports comedy film. Based on a short film by Jack Epps Jr., the feature-length film was scheduled for release in 1980 but was not actually released until 1984. Directed by Dick Lowry, it stars Eugene Roche, Grant Goodeve and Tony Randall. It was broadcast on television, not released as a theatrical feature.

== Plot summary ==
In the late 1960s in a small town, a police chief and his hippie son lead opposing football teams to settle their differences. The police ("Pigs") play against the hippies ("Freaks").

== Cast ==
- Eugene Roche as Chief Frank Brockmeyer
- Grant Goodeve as Neal Brockmeyer
- Tony Randall as Rambaba Organimus
- Adam Baldwin as Mickey South
- Penny Peyser as Janice Zimmer
- Brian Dennehy as Sergeant Cheever
- Stephen Furst as "Steamboat"
- Gloria De Haven as Maureen Brockmeyer
- Patrick Swayze as Doug Zimmer
- William Windom as Mayor Malcolm Wallwood
- Chieko Araki as Debby Brockmeyer
- Charlie Bloom as Creekmore
- Dave Cass as Keough
- Elisha Cook as Novatney
- Jack Eiseman as Cochran
- Jim Greenleaf as Blatz
- J. D. Hall as Riley Webster
- Curtis F. Hanson as FBI Agent #1
- Tom Harmon as Game Announcer
- Lanny Horn as Morton
- Graham Jarvis as Commander Oliver Krebs
- Holly Johnson as Reporter
- Joe Kapp as Pete Bose
- Priscilla Lauris as Mom
- Tom Martin as "Chow-Chow" Gedrechowski
- Alan Oliney as Fishbeck
- Shari Santilli as Emily Wallwood
- Pat Studstill as "Mad Dog" Osloff
- Shauna Sullivan as Kim
- Robina Suwol as Pig Wife
- Vern Taylor as Pop
- Brad Wilkin as Ben Grimaldi
- Eugenia Wright as Didi
- Roger Edmonds as Football Official 1

== Crew ==
- Frank Beascoechea: Director of Photography
- Gordon Dawson: Screenwriter
- Jack Epps, Jr.: Writer, original story; Producer
- Duane Toler: Script Supervisor
- Robert Lovenheim: Supervising Producer
- Robert Huddleston: Producer
- Mark Snow: Music
- Dale Johnston: Sound Editor
- Caro Jones: Casting

== Production ==
The film was based on a 1970 short film by Jack Epps Jr. which won a Blue Ribbon from the American Film Institute. The story was based on a real-life softball game with a similar premise in 1970. Mostly filmed in Corvallis, Oregon.

It was also an annual charity football game between East Lansing police and students at Michigan State University.
