= Les Soeurs Soleil =

Les Sœurs Soleil
- Theatrical release poster
- Directed by: Jeannot Szwarc
- Written by: Marie-Anne Chazel; Michel Delgado
- Produced by: Alain Terzian
- Starring: Marie-Anne Chazel; Clémentine Célarié; Thierry Lhermitte
- Cinematography: Fabio Conversi
- Edited by: Catherine Kelber
- Music by: Eric Levi
- Production company: Gaumont
- Distributed by: Gaumont Buena Vista International
- Release date: 2 April 1997
- Running time: 92 minutes
- Country: France
- Language: French

Les Sœurs Soleil is a 1997 French comedy film directed by Jeannot Szwarc, co-written by Marie-Anne Chazel who stars with Clémentine Célarié and Thierry Lhermitte. It tells the story of a privileged woman who is transformed by encountering the very different world of popular music.

== Plot ==
Bénédicte lives with her husband Brice and schoolgirl daughter Clémence in the grand house outside Paris that she has inherited from her father and Brice runs the business she has inherited from her father. Classically trained, she is a keen member of the local church and is rehearsing a pop opera she has composed called “Noah's Ark”, in which the children and their mothers sing and dance. Clémence wins two tickets to the recording of a music video by her idol, the flamboyant diva Gloria Soleil, and both she and her mother are persuaded to get into costume and join the cast of what turns out to be a raunchy production. At the local Lions club, where Brice had hoped to be next year's president, the video is shown by mistake and people recognise Bénédicte.

When Bénédicte storms round to Gloria's address to demand withdrawal of the video, she finds her being harassed by bailiffs and is persuaded to let her hide in Bénédicte's house. Gloria goes to the airport to meet an Australian band she is going to work with, who also camp out in Bénédicte's house, leaving her when they eventually go a large quantity of marijuana and their pet kangaroo. After consuming far too much of the hash he is totally unused to, Brice is seduced at work by his attractive secretary and the entwined couple are spotted by Clémence when she drops in after school.

Clémence is sent off to a holiday camp and, after further misunderstandings, Bénédicte leaves Brice to join Gloria on an eventful tour that opens her eyes to other ways of life. In London, a percipient producer realises that she and Gloria could be two opposing halves of a commercial whole and a new act – the Soleil Sisters – is born. He also sees potential in “Noah's Ark” which, with professional polish added, proves a hit in its very different market. Bénédicte reconciles with a contrite Brice, who is rolling in money after selling their house at an exorbitant price to Japanese investors.

== Cast ==
- Marie-Anne Chazel as Bénédicte D'Hachicourt
- Thierry Lhermitte as Brice D'Hachicourt
- Clémentine Célarié as Gloria Soleil / Françoise Tricot
- Didier Bénureau as L'Abbé Gervais
- Bernard Farcy as Norbert
- Isabelle Carré as Murielle Musart
- Patrick Mazet as Maxo
- Matthew Marsden as Lawrence
- Erick Desmarestz as Gilles Jutard
- Adrian Lester as Isaac Nelson
- Annie Grégorio as Jackie
- Christian Clavier as a Spectator
- Jean Reno as a Spectator

== Production ==
The movie was filmed in London, England and Paris, France.

== Reception ==
The film opened on 330 screens in France and grossed $813,804 placing fifth at the French box office.
