= Vincent Castellanos =

American former actor

Vincent Castellanos (born February 7, 1962) is an American former actor. He is perhaps best known for his role as Mateo in the film Anaconda (1997). He also appeared in the films The Crow: City of Angels (1996) and Mulholland Drive (2001), as well as the television series Twin Peaks: The Return (2017) and the music video for Charli XCX's song "Beg for You" (2022).

== Filmography ==
- The Crow: City of Angels (1996) - Spider Monkey
- On Seventh Avenue (1996) (TV) - Tito
- Anaconda (1997) - Mateo
- K-911 (1999) (video) - Harry Stripe
- The Last Marshal (1999) - Torres
- The Disciples (2000) (TV) - Felix
- Lost in the Pershing Point Hotel (2000) - Toothpick Jorge
- Primary Suspect (2000) - Reuben
- Mulholland Drive (2001) - Ed
- Amy's Orgasm (2001) - Hans
- Room 101 (2001) - Bill
- The Master of Disguise (2002) - Art Dealer
- The Street King (2002) - Palacios
- Fascination (2004) - District Attorney
- Eulogy (2004) - Adult Film Actor
- Twin Peaks (2017) (TV) - Federico
