= Fully Formed Entertainment =

American film production company

- Type: Private
- Industry: Motion pictures
- Founded: October 5, 2018; 8 years ago
- Founder: Brad Fuller; Andrew Form
- Headquarters: Los Angeles, California, United States
- Area served: Worldwide
- Key people: Brad Fuller

Fully Formed Entertainment is an American film production company started in 2018 by Brad Fuller and Andrew Form, who also co-founded Platinum Dunes with Michael Bay.

== History ==
Coming off the success of A Quiet Place with their previous company, Platinum Dunes, Brad Fuller and Andrew Form made a split from the company to form Fully Formed Entertainment in 2018, signing a three-year, first-look non-exclusive deal with Paramount Pictures to produce its feature films.

On November 22, 2019, Alex Ginno was hired as the Head of Film for the company.

In March 2020, Fully Formed announced that they'll be producing a film potentially about fast cars with John Wick director Chad Stahelski set to direct.

In November 2020, Andrew Form left the company to join Sunday Night Productions, with Fuller planning "to venture on his own as a producer." However, Fuller returned to Platinum Dunes in June 2022 with a first-look deal with Universal Pictures leaving the company's fate uncertain until August 2024 when it was announced that Fully Formed will be producing a reboot to the Anaconda film series set to release in 2025.

== Filmography ==
Year	Film	Director	Distributor(s)	References	Budget	Gross	Rotten Tomatoes
2025	Anaconda	Tom Gormican	Sony Pictures Releasing		$45M	$135M	48%
