= Hans Bauer (writer) =

Austrian screenwriter, author and photographer

Hans Bauer is an Austrian screenwriter, author, and photographer, working in the United States, who is best known for his writing for the films Anaconda (1997) and Anacondas: The Hunt for the Blood Orchid (2004). Bauer is also the co-author (with Catherine Masciola) of the children's adventure novel Fishtale, and the author of Anaconda: The Writer's Cut.

Bauer was born in Austria, and lives and works in Texas and Los Angeles.

== Screenwriting ==
Bauer wrote the original screenplay for the 1997 film Anaconda, which received mainly negative reviews from film critics. Bauer was one of several writers who are credited with screenwriting the 2004 sequel, Anacondas: The Hunt for the Blood Orchid, which also failed to garner critical acclaim.

The horror film Komodo, based on Bauer's screenplay, was also panned by critics, while his next film, Titan A.E., in which he was also an associate producer, received praise for its animated effects.

== Filmography ==
Year	Title	Writer	Producer	Ref.
1997	Anaconda	Yes	No	
1998	Milo	No	Yes	
1999	Komodo	Yes	No	
2000	Titan A.E.	Story	Associate	
2004	Anacondas: The Hunt for the Blood Orchid	Story	No	
2004	Highwaymen	Yes	No	
2007	The Flock	Yes	No	

== Published works ==
- Fishtale (2012)
- Anaconda: The Writer's Cut
- In the Beginning (1991, 2013; editor; non-fiction)

== Photography ==
Bauer is a photographer, and his photo-based art has been the subject of several group and one-man shows in Los Angeles, San Francisco, Austin, and the Texas Hill Country.
