= Harrah, Yemen =

Coordinates: 15°00′N 50°24′E

- Interactive map of Harrah, Yemen
- Country: Yemen
- Governorate: Hadhramaut
- Time zone: UTC+3 (Yemen Standard Time)

Harrah, Yemen is a village in eastern Yemen. It is located in the Hadhramaut Governorate, the country's largest governorate.
