= Jack Epps Jr. =

American screenwriter and educator

- Born: November 3, 1949 (age 76); Detroit, Michigan, U.S.
- Education: Michigan State University
- Occupations: Screenwriter, author, educator
- Known for: Co-writer of Top Gun, Legal Eagles, The Secret of My Success

Jack Epps Jr. (born November 3, 1949) is an American screenwriter, author, and educator, known chiefly for such popular 1980s films as Top Gun, Legal Eagles, and The Secret of My Success, which he wrote with longtime partner Jim Cash. Epps Jr. graduated from the College of Arts and Letters at Michigan State University, and he has since gone on to teach at the University of Southern California.

== Career ==
Jack Epps Jr. began his career in the film industry after studying at Michigan State University, where he made his first student film. Upon arriving in California, he collaborated with Anderson House to write episodes for Hawaii Five-O ("The Capsule Kidnapping," 1976) and Kojak ("A Hair-Trigger Away," 1976). In 1975, Epps worked as an Assistant Cameraman with cinematographer Gary Graver on Orson Welles' film The Other Side of the Wind. After House left to pursue producing, Epps partnered with Jim Cash. Together, they wrote Dick Tracy for several directors, including Warren Beatty.

Epps and Cash achieved significant success with their screenplay for Top Gun, which became a worldwide box office hit in 1986. The duo later wrote Legal Eagles and The Secret of My Success, both released in 1986. Epps has been involved in numerous projects, collaborating with prominent figures in the industry and contributing to various genres, including action and comedy.

=== Top Gun ===
After completing seven unproduced screenplays together, Top Gun became Epps and Cash's first produced screenplay. This film went on to become the number-one worldwide box office hit in 1986. Jack Epps Jr. did original research for the screenplay to Top Gun by traveling to NAS Miramar and flew in the back seat in a F5F Navy jet and experienced dog fighting and high speed passes. In addition, he flew in the back seat of a Navy jet during the Top Gun School Graduation where the US Air Force acted as the aggressor squadron and the Top Gun graduates defended their territory. Epps experienced high speed dogfights over the Mojave Desert near NAWS China Lake US Navy provided Epps with a technical advisor, Commander Peter Pettigrew, Mig-Killer and former Top Gun Instructor, to help Epps research the Top Gun program.

=== Later success ===
After this, they quickly wrote other screenplays that were produced, including Legal Eagles and The Secret of My Success. Epps has co-authored over 25 screenplays and eight motion pictures that he produced well into the following decade, including Turner & Hooch, Dick Tracy, and Anaconda. He wrote for some of the most successful actors in the industry including Tom Cruise, Robert Redford, Tom Hanks, Warren Beatty and others.

== Teaching ==
Jack Epps Jr. is a full professor and Chair of the Writing for Screen and Television Division in the School of Cinematic Arts, at the University of Southern California. Using techniques he had developed over his career and applied to classes, he authored a screenwriting manual, Screenwriting is Rewriting: The Art and Craft of Professional Revision, in 2016.

== Awards and honors ==
Jack Epps Jr. was awarded an honorary doctorate of fine arts by Michigan State University at their 2009 commencement. He is also the recipient of the Michigan State University Spartans in Hollywood Award. He is part of the Writers Guild of America where he has been a member for three decades and he is a member of the Academy of Motion Picture Arts and Sciences. In 2010, Epps was named the inaugural holder of the Jack Oakie and Victoria Horne Oakie Endowed Chair in Comedy at the USC School of Cinematic Arts. This position honors Jack Oakie's legacy and supports the academic study of comedy. The film Top Gun, co-written by Epps, was added to the National Film Registry. Additionally, the American Film Institute (AFI) included the quote “I feel the need… the need for speed” as one of the top 100 movie quotes in American cinema.

== Filmography ==
Year	Title	Writer	Producer	Notes
1976	Hawaii Five-O	Yes	No	Episode: "The Capsule Kidnapping"
1976	Kojak	Yes	No	Episode: "A Hair-Trigger Away"
1984	Off Sides (Pigs vs. Freaks)	Story	Yes	Television film
1986	Top Gun	Yes	No	
1986	Legal Eagles	Yes	No	
1987	The Secret of My Success	Yes	No	
1989	Turner & Hooch	Yes	No	
1990	Dick Tracy	Yes	No	
1997	Anaconda	Yes	No	
2000	The Flintstones in Viva Rock Vegas	Yes	No	
2004	Anacondas: The Hunt for the Blood Orchid	Story	No	
2020	Action	No	Executive	Short film
