= VF-302 =

Fighter Squadron 302
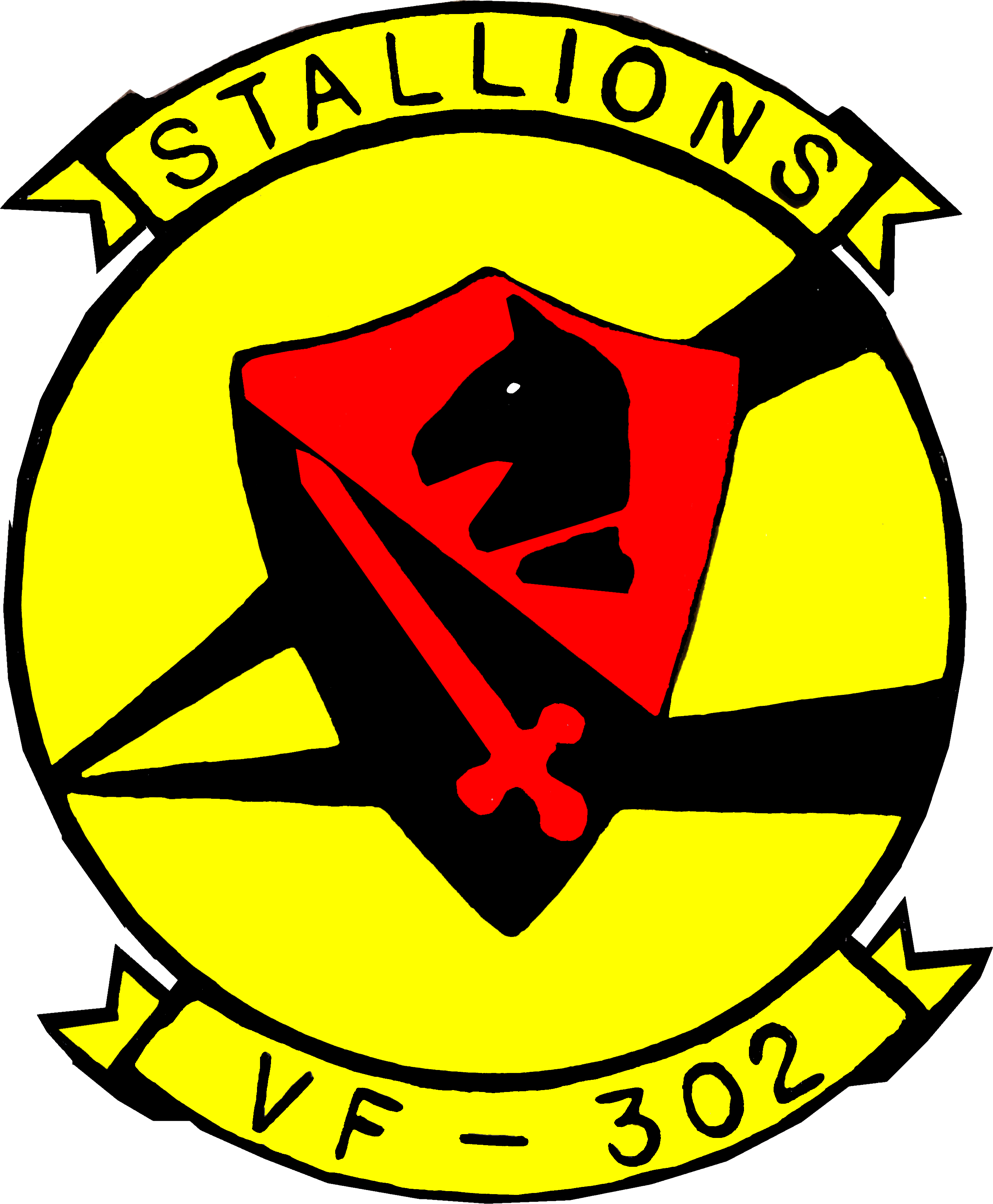
- VF-302 Insignia
- Active: 21 May 1971 - 11 September 1994
- Country: United States
- Allegiance: United States Navy Reserve
- Branch: United States Navy
- Type: Reserve fighter squadron
- Part of: Reserve Carrier Air Wing 30
- Garrison/HQ: Naval Air Station Miramar
- Nickname(s): "Stallions"

Aircraft flown
- Fighter: F-8L Crusader; F-4B/N/S Phantom; F-14A Tomcat

Fighter Squadron 302 (VF-302) was an aviation unit of the United States Naval Reserve in service from 1971 to 1994. The squadron's nickname was Stallions.

== History ==
VF-302 was activated on 21 May 1971 and assigned to Reserve Carrier Air Wing 30 (CVWR-30) (tail code "ND") at Naval Air Station Miramar, California (USA). From its inception until November 1973 they operated the F-8K Crusader, at this point trading in their F-8s for F-4B Phantoms. Like their sister squadron VF-301, VF-302's time with the B model was short, the squadron moved to the F-4N in January 1975. During their time with the F-4N, VF-302 won the USNR Battle 'E', signifying them as the best fighter squadron in the Naval Reserve.

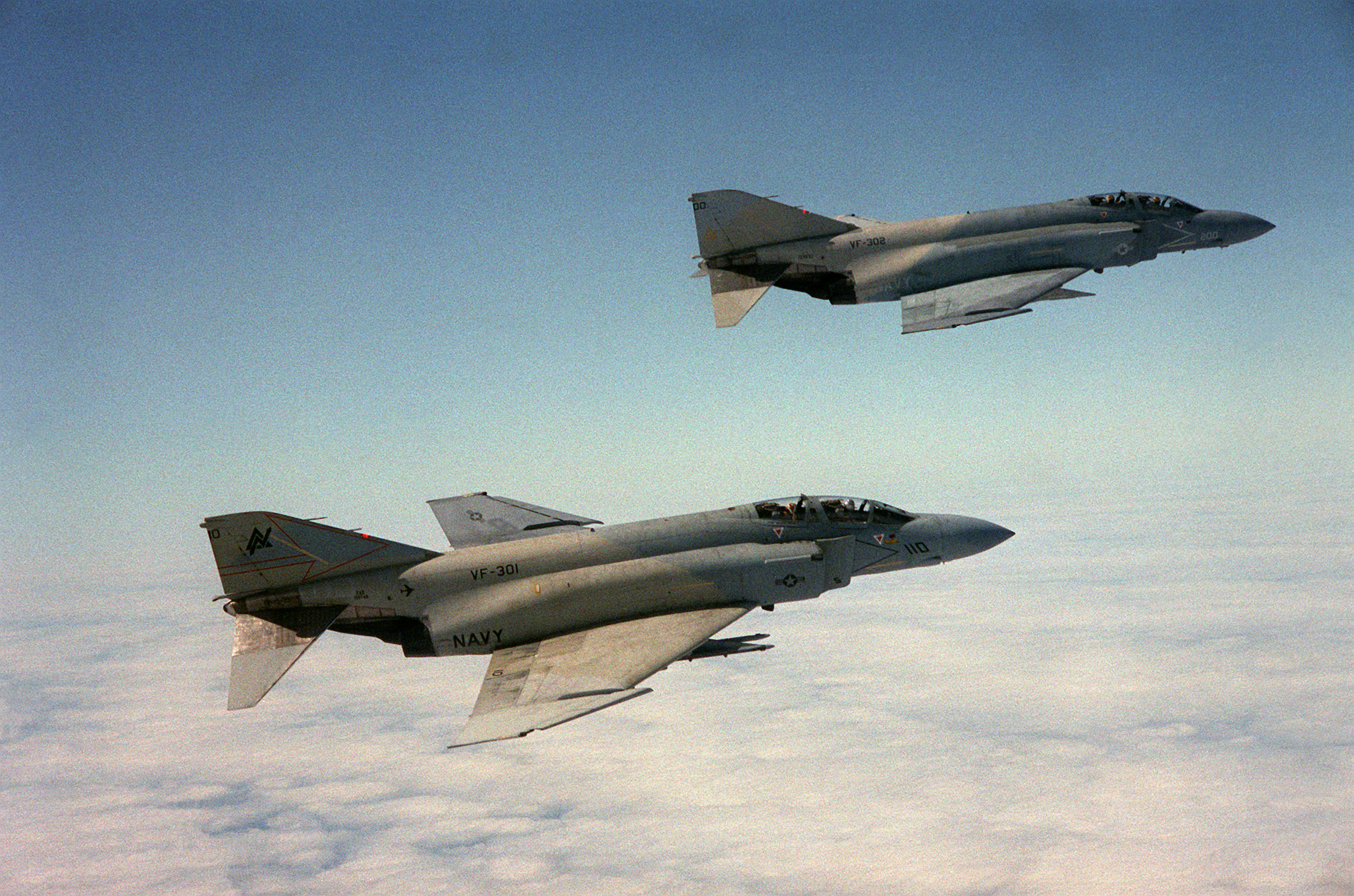
VF-301 and VF-302 F-4s in 1983

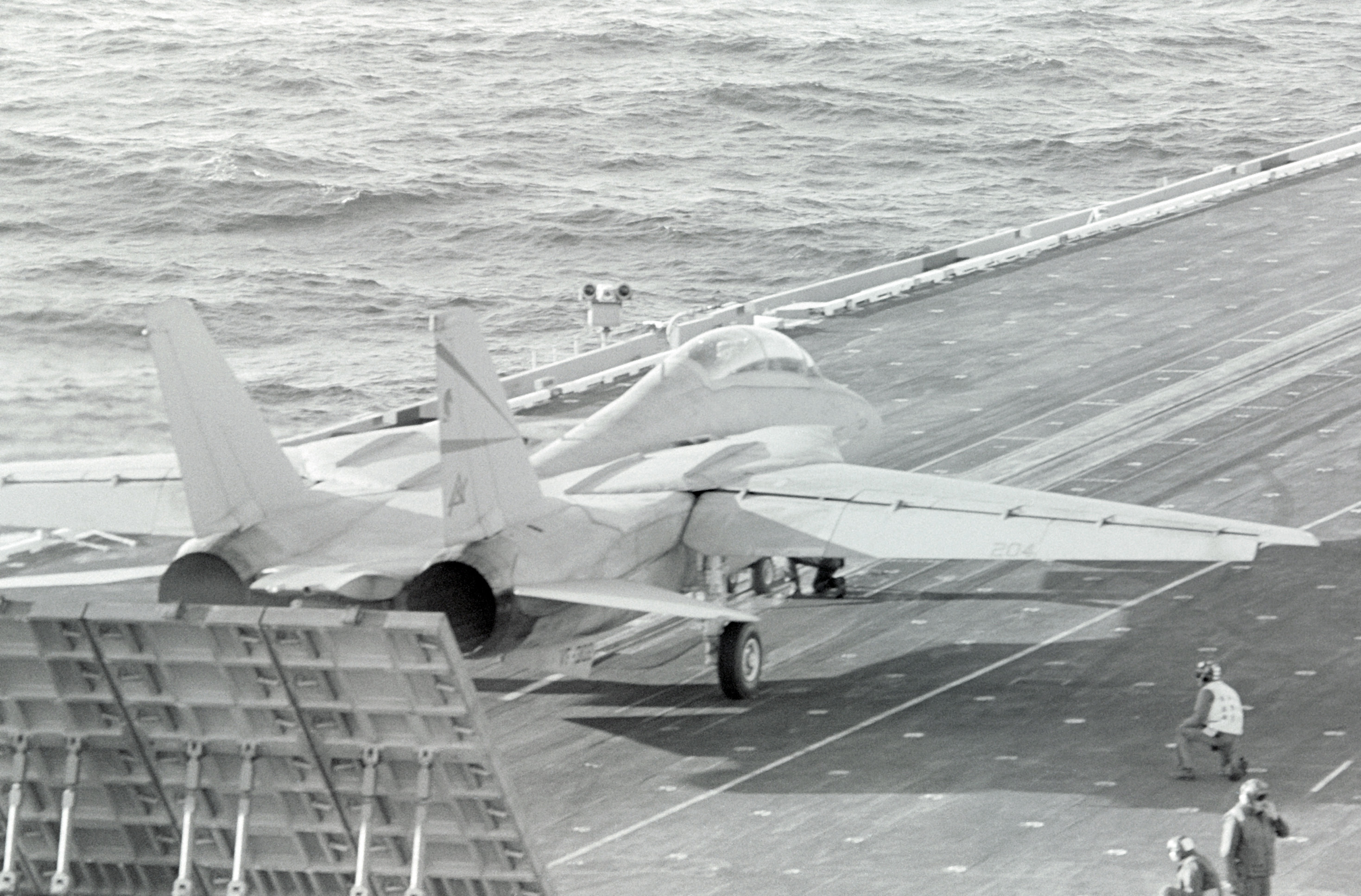
VF-302 F-14A on USS Constellation in 1987

In 1981 they transitioned to the F-4S. VF-302 was based at NAS Miramar, near San Diego, California at hangar number 5. Due to its location near the fuel pits, VF-302 operated the transient flight line along with their own flight line. Hangar 5 was the smallest facility on NAS Miramar but managed to accommodate two other squadrons, her sister squadron VF-301 and VAW-88, which flew the Grumman E-2C Hawkeye in the 1980s.

After four years operating the last F-4 variant, VF-302 began to receive the F-14A Tomcat in February 1985. VF-302 and VF-301 deployed onto USS Ranger in January 1986, performing their first carrier qualifications in the F-14. Two years later the squadron got more carrier experience by spending 12 days on board USS Enterprise between 10 and 22 August 1988.

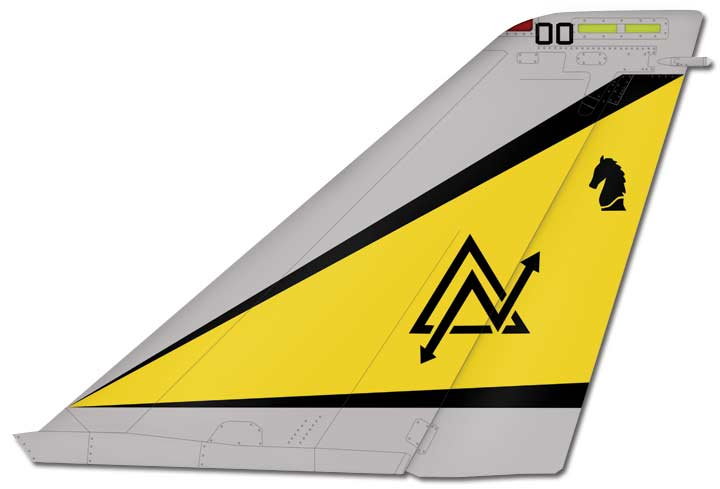
VF-302 F-14 tail markings

1986 had seen VF-302 pick up the TARPS mission, the first reserve squadron to do so. In 1986, only eight months after receiving their first TARPS pod, and then again in 1988 they had the chance to practice these skills as part of the biennial, World Reconnaissance Air Meet (RAM) at Bergstrom Air Force Base in Texas, both times achieving first place victories among all participating USN/USMC squadrons. As well as other TARPS equipped F-14 units the meet allowed VF-302 crews to meet Air Force reconnaissance crews, to train together.

After the end of the Cold War CVWR-30 and VF-302 were disestablished on 11 September 1994.

== See also ==
- History of the United States Navy
- List of inactive United States Navy aircraft squadrons
- List of United States Navy aircraft squadrons
- United States Navy Reserve
