= Karl Yune =

American actor (born 1975)

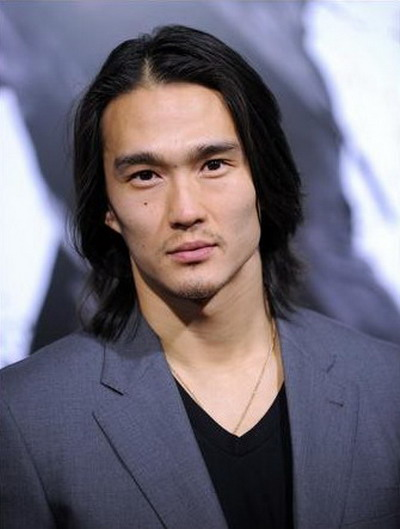
- Premiere appearance
- Born: April 16, 1975 (age 50); Washington, D.C., U.S.
- Education: Columbia University
- Occupation: Actor
- Years active: 2004—present
- Relatives: Rick Yune (brother)

Karl Yune (born April 16, 1975) is an American actor. He is best known for his role as Maseo Yamashiro in the DC Comics TV franchise Arrow, as Tak Mashido in the sci-fi film Real Steel, and as Koichi in the film Memoirs of a Geisha. His first lead role was in the cult thriller Anacondas: The Hunt for the Blood Orchid, as Tran.

== Early life ==
Yune, a Korean American, was born and raised in Washington, D.C., the son of Yun Taeho and Park Wonhui. Yune was educated at Georgetown Preparatory School, an American Jesuit college preparatory school, one of the most selective and oldest all-boys school in the United States. Yune studied business, literature, and philosophy before he switched to a major in theater at Columbia University School of the Arts in New York after winning the role of Romeo for a presentation of Romeo and Juliette.

== Career ==
Yune got his first lead role in a studio film as Tran, one of the guides in Anacondas: The Hunt for the Blood Orchid. He has also appeared in Forbidden Warrior, and Memoirs of a Geisha, as well as in the short films Miracle Mile (which received several awards), and Hold Up. He also acted in various Off-Broadway plays, and has done fashion modeling. Yune appears in the third season of Arrow as Maseo Yamashiro, (the Arrow's friend and mentor) who later becomes 2nd in command of the League of Assassins, and is also married to Katana (Tatsu Yamashiro).

Karl Yune is sometimes credited as Carl Yune and Karl Hahn (as in Miracle Mile).

== Personal life ==
He is the younger brother of actor Rick Yune. Yune currently resides in Los Angeles.

== Filmography ==
=== Film ===
Year	Title	Role	Notes
2004	Forbidden Warrior	Locust	
2004	Anacondas: The Hunt for the Blood Orchid	Tran	
2004	Miracle Mile	James Hudson	Credited as "Karl Hahn"; Short film
2004	Hold Up	Cashier	Short film
2005	Memoirs of a Geisha	Koichi	
2005	Freezerburn	Alex the 2nd A.D.	
2006	Ken	Ken	Short film
2007	Hers	K	
2008	Speed Racer	Taejo Body Guard	
2009	Slaughter		
2011	Real Steel	Tak Mashido	
2015	The Invitation	Choi	

=== Television ===
Year	Title	Role	Notes
2004	One on One	Emcee	Episode: "Bright Lights, Big City"
2008	Knight Rider	Ian Chang	Episode: "Journey to the End of the Knight"
2014–2015	Arrow	Maseo Yamashiro	19 episodes
2018	Magnum P.I.	Bobby Malua	Episode 1.8: "Die He Said"
2020–2021	FraXtur	Brett Tucker	

=== Video games ===
Year	Title	Voice role	Notes
2005	50 Cent: Bulletproof	Chinese Rig	
