= Anaconda (1997 film) =

American horror film by Luis Llosa

- Theatrical release poster
- Directed by: Luis Llosa
- Written by: Hans Bauer; Jim Cash; Jack Epps Jr.
- Produced by: Verna Harrah; Carol Little; Leonard Rabinowitz
- Starring: Jennifer Lopez; Ice Cube; Jon Voight; Eric Stoltz; Jonathan Hyde; Owen Wilson
- Cinematography: Bill Butler
- Edited by: Michael R. Miller
- Music by: Randy Edelman
- Production companies: Columbia Pictures; Cinema Line Film Corporation
- Distributed by: Sony Pictures Releasing
- Release date: April 11, 1997
- Running time: 89 minutes
- Countries: United States; Brazil
- Language: English
- Budget: $45 million
- Box office: $136.8 million

Anaconda is a 1997 natural horror film directed by Luis Llosa and written by Hans Bauer, Jim Cash and Jack Epps Jr.. The film stars Jennifer Lopez, Ice Cube, Jon Voight, Eric Stoltz, Jonathan Hyde, and Owen Wilson. An international co-production between the United States and Brazil, the film focuses on a documentary film crew in the Amazon rainforest that is led by a snake hunter who is hunting down a giant, legendary green anaconda.

The film received generally mixed reviews, but was a box office success, and has become a 1990s cult classic. It is the first installment in the Anaconda film series.

== Plot ==
On the Amazon River, a poacher hides from an unknown creature in his boat. When it breaks through the boat and corners him, he commits suicide with his Colt Police Positive revolver.

A film crew is searching for the Shirishamas, a long-lost indigenous Amazonian tribe. The group consists of director Terri Flores, cameraman and childhood friend Danny Rich, production manager Denise Kalberg, Denise's boyfriend and sound engineer Gary Dixon, narrator Warren Westridge, anthropologist Professor Steven Cale, and boat skipper Mateo.

The group encounters stranded Paraguayan snake hunter Paul Serone, who claims he can help find the Shirishamas. Most of the crew are uncomfortable around Serone, and Cale clashes with him several times about Shirishama lore. Eventually, Cale is stung by a wasp, and an allergic reaction swells up his throat and leaves him unconscious. Serone performs an emergency cricothyrotomy, saving Cale's life. Soon after, with Gary's help, Serone takes over the boat, revealing his true goal: finding and capturing a giant green anaconda he had been tracking.

Danny, Mateo, and Serone search the wreckage of the poacher's boat. An old newspaper photograph reveals that Mateo, Serone, and the poacher hunted together, including snakes. Leaving the poacher's ship, Mateo falls into the water, where the giant male anaconda, measuring 25 ft (7.6 m), ambushes and kills him, while the other two return to their boat, unaware of Mateo's fate. Serone manipulates Gary into helping him ensnare the creature, enticing him with the promise of a $1 million prize. That night, he uses a dead monkey as bait to catch the creature, which proceeds to emerge and attack the crew. He attempts to capture the snake, but it coils around Gary, crushing him. Terri tries to shoot the anaconda, but Serone intervenes, allowing the creature to devour Gary, devastating Denise. The crew overpowers Serone and ties him up as punishment.

The next day, the boat becomes jammed near a waterfall. Terri, Danny, and Westridge enter the water to winch it loose. Denise attempts to kill Serone to avenge Gary's death, but he overpowers and strangles her with his legs, then dumps her corpse into the river. When the creature returns, Westridge distracts it for Terri and Danny to retreat. Serone breaks free during the attack and assaults Danny. The snake mounts a tree branch and attacks Westridge, unintentionally uprooting the tree, which kills Westridge in the subsequent fall. The snake attacks Danny, but Terri kills it by repeatedly shooting it in the head with a Winchester Model 70 rifle. An enraged Serone boards the boat, attacks Terri, and attempts to kill Danny. Cale, having been awakened by the chaos, stabs Serone with a tranquilizer dart, and Danny knocks Serone into the river.

Further down the river, the survivors discover an abandoned sawmill, which Terri and Danny search to find more fuel. Serone catches up to them and ties up Terri and Danny, drenching them with animal blood to bait a second, much larger female queen anaconda, measuring 40 ft (12 m). As it slowly suffocates them, Serone tries to catch it in a net. The snake breaks free and attacks him, eventually swallowing him whole, while Terri and Danny escape their bonds. Terri flees into a building, finding a nest full of newborn anacondas, and is chased up a smokestack. Danny uses a pickaxe to pin the snake's tail to the ground, then ignites a fire below the smokestack, setting the snake ablaze; the resulting explosion sends the burning anaconda flying out of the building and into the water. As Terri and Danny recuperate on a nearby dock, the creature suddenly resurfaces, but Danny stabs its head with an axe.

Afterward, the pair reunites with Cale, who is recovering on the boat. While floating downriver, the trio finds the Shirishama tribe and begins filming their documentary.

== Cast ==
- Jennifer Lopez as Terri Flores
- Ice Cube as Danny Rich
- Jon Voight as Paul Serone
- Eric Stoltz as Dr. Steven Cale
- Jonathan Hyde as Warren Westridge
- Owen Wilson as Gary Dixon
- Kari Wuhrer as Denise Kalberg
- Vincent Castellanos as Mateo
- Danny Trejo as Poacher
- Frank Welker and Gary A. Hecker as the voices of the Anaconda snake characters.

== Production ==
=== Development and writing ===
Hans Bauer said the idea for Anaconda came about from a false memory he had of the original King Kong wherein King Kong was fighting with a giant snake (in actuality it was a giant lizard but Bauer didn't notice the feet) that he would remember when watching nature documentaries on anacondas and felt there could be a movie there. Bauer's original script (which was heavily rewritten by subsequent writers) would've followed Chicago biology teacher Andie Easter, who along with six other colleagues who hatch a plan to join a modern day gold rush by going to Brazil that Summer to a supposedly rich area of the Amazon rainforest only to fall victim to the effects of "gold fever" (similar to The Treasure of the Sierra Madre) while also contending with three giant snakes into whose territory they have unwittingly wandered. Bauer would later publish his original screenplay in novelization under the title of Anaconda: The Writer’s Cut.

Rewrites were performed on Bauer's script by Jim Cash and Jack Epps Jr. who are credited and by John M. Mandel who went uncredited. Two mechanical snakes were built for the production by Walt Conti with one by 25 feet long and another being 40 feet long. Director Luis Llosa also stated that real Anacondas were used for certain shots while the major attack sequences were accomplished with computer-generated imagery.

=== Filming ===
Shooting took place on location in Brazil as well as at the Fantasy Island lagoon at the Los Angeles County Arboretum and Botanic Garden which was used for more claustrophobic sequences at the climax of the film.

== Music ==
Randy Edelman composed and conducted the film's soundtrack, released by Edel America Records.

== Reception ==
=== Box office ===
The film opened at No. 1 with $16.6 million in its first weekend and remained at the top spot in its following week. In total, Anaconda went on to gross $136.8 million worldwide.

=== Critical response ===
On the review aggregator website Rotten Tomatoes, 41% of 59 critics' reviews are positive, with an average rating of 4.9/10. The website's consensus reads: "Anaconda’s pulpy pleasures are constricted by its own absurdity, but creature feature fans may enjoy its brazen silliness." Metacritic, which uses a weighted average, assigned the film a score of 37 out of 100, based on 20 critics, indicating "generally unfavorable" reviews. Audiences polled by CinemaScore gave the film an average grade of "B−" on an A+ to F scale.

Film critic Leonard Maltin awarded the film 2 out of 4 stars, criticizing the film's "hokey" special effects and "expositionless" script but complimented the film's use of Brazilian locale and Voight's campy performance. Roger Ebert awarded the film 3 1/2 out of 4 stars and called it a "slick, scary, funny Creature Feature, beautifully photographed and splendidly acted in high adventure style".

Despite the initial negative reception, Anaconda has since become a cult classic, often viewed as being so-bad-it's-good. The film is listed in Golden Raspberry Award founder John Wilson's book The Official Razzie Movie Guide as one of The 100 Most Enjoyably Bad Movies Ever Made.

=== Accolades ===
Anaconda was nominated for six Razzie Awards in 1998 including Worst Picture (which lost to The Postman), Worst Actor (Jon Voight; which went to Kevin Costner for The Postman), Worst Director (awarded to Costner for The Postman), Worst Screenplay (lost to The Postman), Worst New Star ("the animatronic anaconda"; which went to Dennis Rodman for Double Team) and Worst Screen Couple (Voight and "the animatronic anaconda"; where they lost to Rodman and Jean-Claude Van Damme for Double Team). It was also nominated for two Saturn Awards including Best Actress (Jennifer Lopez; who lost to Jodie Foster for Contact) and Best Horror Film (which went to The Devil's Advocate). It won two Stinkers Awards including Worst Supporting Actor and Worst Fake Accent for Jon Voight (who also won the latter award for Most Wanted).

Award	Category	Subject	Results
Golden Raspberry Award	Worst Picture	Verna Harrah	Nominated
Golden Raspberry Award	Worst Picture	Carole Little	Nominated
Golden Raspberry Award	Worst Picture	Leonard Rabinowitz	Nominated
Golden Raspberry Award	Worst Director	Luis Llosa	Nominated
Golden Raspberry Award	Worst Screenplay	Hans Bauer	Nominated
Golden Raspberry Award	Worst Screenplay	Jim Cash	Nominated
Golden Raspberry Award	Worst Screenplay	Jack Epps Jr.	Nominated
Golden Raspberry Award	Worst Actor	Jon Voight	Nominated
Golden Raspberry Award	Worst Screen Couple	Jon Voight	Nominated
Golden Raspberry Award	Worst Screen Couple	The animatronic anaconda	Nominated
Golden Raspberry Award	Worst New Star	The animatronic anaconda	Nominated
Saturn Award	Best Actress	Jennifer Lopez	Nominated
Saturn Award	Best Horror Film		Nominated
Stinkers Bad Movie Award	Worst Supporting Actor	Jon Voight	Won
Stinkers Bad Movie Award	Worst Fake Accent	Jon Voight	Won

=== Legacy ===
The broadcast of the movie during primetime viewing on South African television station e.tv has become a national running gag, with the station airing the movie several times every year since the mid-2000s.

== Franchise ==
=== Sequels ===
A sequel, Anacondas: The Hunt for the Blood Orchid, was released to theaters in 2004. Two more films followed and premiered on Syfy, as television films: Anaconda 3: Offspring (2008) and Anacondas: Trail of Blood (2009).

=== Crossover ===
Lake Placid vs. Anaconda is a crossover film with the Lake Placid film series. It was released in 2015.

Even though no characters from the first film appear in the sequels, the events of the first film are referenced by the character Cole Burris in the second film, when he says he knows a man (Dr. Steven Cale) and another man (Danny Rich) that took a crew down to the Amazon, where they were attacked by snakes; in Lake Placid vs. Anaconda, character Will "Tully" Tull describes the same incident of the snakes in the Amazon to Reba, without explicitly mentioning the characters.

=== Remake ===
On March 1, 2024, an indirect Chinese-produced remake titled Anaconda, based on the first and second films was released. It was written by Foxfoxbee, and produced and directed by Xiang Quiliang and Xiang Hesheng.

=== Reboot ===
In January 2020, Sony Pictures announced a reboot is in development and screenwriter Evan Daugherty was hired to write the reboot film. In 2023, Tom Gormican was announced to direct the film. In August 2024, Variety reported that Jack Black and Paul Rudd were in early talks to star in the film, which was said to focus on a group of friends who seek to remake the original 1997 film. Gormican would also co-write with Kevin Etten. Brad Fuller and Andrew Form would produce through their Fully Formed Entertainment company. Daniela Melchior joined the cast a month later. It was released in December 2025 to mixed reviews.

== See also ==
- List of killer snake films
