= Verna Harrah =

American film producer

- Born: Verna Rae Harrison; July 25, 1944; Nampa, Idaho, U.S.
- Died: June 29, 2012 (aged 67); San Diego, California, U.S.
- Occupation: Film producer
- Spouse: William F. Harrah (m. 1974; died 1978)

Verna Rae Harrah (née Harrison; July 25, 1944 – June 29, 2012) was an American film producer. She was the widow of William F. Harrah, the hotel and casino magnate She contributed to many charities and philanthropic causes.

== Filmography ==
Year	Title	Producer	Director(s)	Notes
1997	Anaconda	Yes	Luis Llosa	
2002	Who's Your Daddy?	Yes	Andy Fickman	
2003	Vacuums	Yes	Luke Cresswell & Steve McNicholas	
2004	Anacondas: The Hunt for the Blood Orchid	Yes	Dwight H. Little	
2009	The Canyon	Executive	Richard Harrah	Final film as a producer
