= Jim Cash =

American screenwriter

- Born: James Willis Cash; January 17, 1941; Boyne City, Michigan, U.S.
- Died: March 25, 2000 (aged 59); East Lansing, Michigan, U.S.
- Education: Michigan State University
- Occupation: Writer
- Known for: Co-writer of Top Gun (1986)
- Spouse: Cynthia Cash
- Children: 4

James Willis Cash (January 17, 1941 – March 25, 2000) was an American film writer, noted for writing such 1980s films as Top Gun and The Secret of My Success.

== Early life and education ==
Cash was born on January 17, 1941, in Boyne City, Michigan.

In 1970, Cash received a B.A. in English from Michigan State University (MSU). In 1972, Cash received an M.A. in Television and Radio from Michigan State University.

== Career ==
As a professor, Cash taught writing and film history at Michigan State University. Cash met a student named Jack Epps, Jr., who would later become his writing partner. Epps was from the Detroit area.

Cash and Epps began their writing relationship while at Michigan State University. In 1975, they wrote their first story together in the MSU Union Grill. Soon afterward Epps moved to Hollywood, California. Cash continued to live in East Lansing, Michigan, while Epps lived in Santa Monica, California. They collaborated via computer.

In 1986, Cash and Epps co-wrote Top Gun and Legal Eagles.

== Personal life ==
Cash married his first wife, Mariann (Mimi), when he was a professor at MSU and she was a sophomore at MSU studying communications.

Cash and his second wife, Cynthia, had four children. He and his wife had a restaurant in Lansing, Michigan.

Cash also established several scholarships for film production and performing arts.

He died on March 25, 2000, in East Lansing after hospitalization for an intestinal ailment at the age of 59.

== Filmography ==
Year	Title	Writer	Director	Notes
1986	Top Gun	Yes	Tony Scott	
1986	Legal Eagles	Yes	Ivan Reitman	
1987	The Secret of My Success	Yes	Herbert Ross	
1989	Turner & Hooch	Yes	Roger Spottiswoode	
1990	Dick Tracy	Yes	Warren Beatty	
1997	Anaconda	Yes	Luis Llosa	
2000	The Flintstones in Viva Rock Vegas	Yes	Brian Levant	Posthumous release
2004	Anacondas: The Hunt for the Blood Orchid	Story	Dwight H. Little	Posthumous release
