= Crystal Allen =

Canadian actress

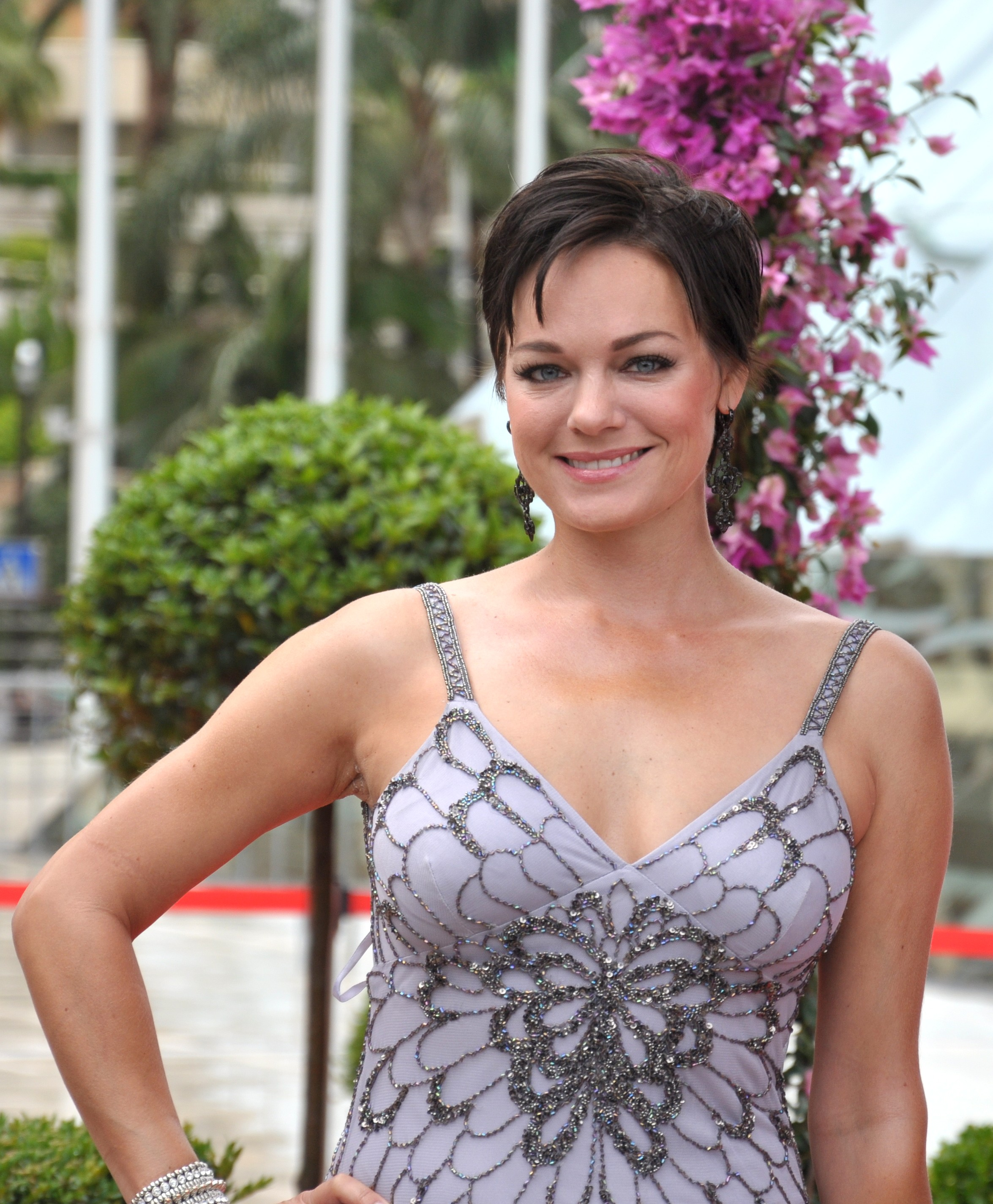
- Allen at the 2013 Monte-Carlo Television Festival
- Occupation: Actress
- Years active: 1998–present
- Website: https://twitter.com/itscrystalallen?lang=en

Crystal Allen is an American-Canadian actress. She is best known for her role as Dr. Amanda Hayes in Anaconda 3: Offspring (2008) and Anacondas: Trail of Blood (2009). She also starred in Maid in Manhattan (2002), Star Trek: Of Gods and Men (2007), and Crooked Arrows (2012). Additionally, she starred in television shows such as NCIS (2003), Star Trek: Enterprise (2005), Femme Fatales (2011), Castle (2013), and Grey's Anatomy (2015).

== Biography ==
Allen studied classical ballet for more than 10 years and "modelled all over the world". She is an actress who has starred and appeared in guest star roles, including episodes of such TV series as Sex and the City, Ed, The Sopranos, Boston Legal, Star Trek: Enterprise, JAG, Desperate Housewives, Femme Fatales and others.

She starred in the Hallmark Channel original movie, Falling in Love with the Girl Next Door. In 2020, she starred as one of the single mothers in Beware of Mom.

== Filmography ==
=== Film ===
Year	Title	Role	Notes
1998	Legionnaire	—N/a	Uncredited and unconfirmed.
1999	The Underground Comedy Movie	Crystalline	
2002	And She Was	Stripper	
2002	Maid in Manhattan	Mr. Lefferts' Girlfriend	
2002	Wolves of Wall Street	Party Girl #2	
2004	Subway Cafe	Samantha May	
2004	Study Hall	Karen	Short film
2007	Star Trek: Of Gods and Men	Conqueror Navigator Yara	
2008	Anaconda 3: Offspring	Scientist Amanda Hayes	
2010	Hanna's Gold	Claire Davis	
2012	Crooked Arrows	Julie Gifford	
2015	The End	Annie Roberts	Short film
2016	Exit Thread	Laura Carlisle	
2020	Beware of Mom	Anna	

=== Television ===
Year	Title	Role	Notes
1999	Sex and the City	Beautiful Girl	Uncredited role, episode: "Old Dogs, New Dicks"
2001	Ed	Selma Northvale	Episode: "The Test"
2002	The Sopranos	Lisa	Episode: "Calling All Cars"
2003	NCIS	Laura	Episode: "Marine Down"
2004	Summerland	Pattie	Episode: "Life in the Fishbowl"
2004	Creating America's Next Hit Television Show	January Beck (No. 2)	Unknown
2005	Boston Legal	Maddie Tyler	Episode: "Schmidt Happens"
2005	JAG	Petty Officer Priscilla Ford	Episode: "Heart of Darkness"
2005	Star Trek: Enterprise	D'Nesh	Episode: "Bound"
2005	Wanted	Linda	Episode: "Pilot"
2006	Falling in Love with the Girl Next Door	Theresa Connolly	Television film
2006	Modern Men	Shelly	Episode: "Sexual Healing"
2007	Desperate Housewives	Kelly	Episode: "My Husband, the Pig"
2007	Sabbatical	Wendy	Unknown
2008	Anaconda 3: Offspring	Amanda Hayes	Television film
2008	Divas of Novella	Cassidy	Television film
2008	Prison Break	Tia	Episode: "The Sunshine State"
2009	Anacondas: Trail of Blood	Amanda Hayes	Television film
2011	Femme Fatales	Rhonda Temple	Episode: "Help Me, Rhonda"
2011	Haven	Colleen Pierce	Episode: "Business as Usual"
2012	Body of Proof	Vanessa Winters	Episode: "Occupational Hazards"
2012	Ghost Storm	Ashley Miller	Television film
2013	Castle	Pauline Degarmo	Episode: "Hunt"
2015	Grey's Anatomy	Heather	Episode: "Don't Dream It's Over"
2015	Stalked By My Doctor	Barbara	Television film
2016	Criminal Minds: Beyond Borders	Jessica Wolf	Episode: "De Los Inocentes"
2016	Supernatural	Rosaleen	Episode: "Rock Never Dies"
