= List of monster movies =

This is a list of monster movies, about such creatures as extraterrestrial aliens, giant animals, Kaiju (the Japanese counterpart of giant animals, but they can also be machines and plants), mutants, supernatural creatures, or creatures from folklore, such as Bigfoot or the Loch Ness Monster. These movies usually fall into the science fiction, fantasy and/or horror genres.

== List ==
Name	Release year	Monster(s)	Ref.
20 Million Miles to Earth	1957	Extraterrestrial from Venus	
2-Headed Shark Attack	2012	Two-headed shark	
3-Headed Shark Attack	2015	Three-headed shark	
5-Headed Shark Attack	2017	Five-headed shark	
The 7th Voyage of Sinbad	1958	Cyclops, dragon, roc	
The ABCs of Death	2012	Bigfoot, living faeces, living toilet, vampire	
Aberration	1997	Mutated lizards	
Abominable	2006	Bigfoot	
The Abominable Snowman	1957	Yeti	
Achoura	2014	Grine	
Alien	1979	Xenomorph	
Alien 3	1992	Xenomorph	
Alien: Covenant	2017	Xenomorph	
Alien Outpost	2014	Alien	
Alien Resurrection	1997	Xenomorph	
Alien: Romulus	2024	Xenomorph	
Aliens	1986	Xenomorph	
Aliens vs. Predator: Requiem	2007	Alien, Predators	
Alien vs. Predator	2004	Alien, Predators	
All Monsters Attack	1969	Godzilla / daikaiju	
Alligator	1980	Giant alligator	
Anaconda	1997	Giant anacondas	
Anaconda	2024	Giant anacondas	
Anaconda	2025	Giant anaconda	
Anacondas: The Hunt for the Blood Orchid	2004	Giant anacondas	
Anaconda 3: Offspring	2008	Giant anacondas	
Anacondas: Trail of Blood	2009	Giant anaconda	
The Anacondas	2025	Giant anacondas	
An American Werewolf in London	1980	Werewolves	
An American Werewolf in Paris	1997	Werewolves	
Animal	2014	Unknown creature	
Another WolfCop	2018	Werewolf	
Arcadian	2024	Unknown creatures	
The Arctic Giant	1942	Dinosaur-esque monster	
Atragon	1963	Manda / daikaiju	
Attack of the 50 Foot Woman	1958	Giant human	
Attack of the Crab Monsters	1958	Giant crabs	
Attack of the Giant Leeches	1959	Giant leeches	
Attack on Titan	2015	Giants / Titans	
Attack the Block	2011	Aliens	
Avenged	2013	Crows	
The Babadook	2014	Ghoul	
Bakemono	2023	Tentacled creature	
Barbarian	2022	Mutant	
The Beast from 20,000 Fathoms	1953	Rhedosaurus	
The Beast of Hollow Mountain	1956	Allosaurus	
Beauty and the Beast (also known as Blood of Beasts)	2005	Transformed human	
Beowulf	2007	Grendel, Grendel's mother, dragon, sea monsters	
The BFG	2016	Giants	
Big Bad Wolf	2006	Werewolf	
Bigfoot: The Movie	2015	Sasquatch	
The Black Scorpion	1957	Giant scorpion	
Blade	1998	Blade, vampires	
Blade II	2002	Blade, mutant vampires, vampires	
Blade Trinity	2004	Blade, vampires, Dracula	
The Blob	1958	Blob	
The Blob	1988	Blob	
Blood Monkey	2007	Apes	
Blood of the Tribades	2016	Vampires	
Blood Ransom	2014	Vampires	
Blood Redd	2014	Canine	
BloodRayne	2005	Vampire, dhampir	
Bloodsuckers from Outer Space	1984	Vampires	
Buffy the Vampire Slayer	1992	Vampires	
Bunker Heights	2026	Sewer creatures	
Cat's Eye	1985	Troll	
The Cave	2005	Cave monsters	.
Clash of the Titans	1981	Kraken, Calibos, Medusa and giant scorpions	
Clash of the Titans	2010	Monsters from Greek mythology	
Class of Nuke 'Em High	1986	Mutant	
Cloverfield	2008	Clover	
Cold Ground	2017	Beast of Gévaudan	
Colossal	2016	Unknown creature	
Creature Feature	2014	Werewolves	
Creature from the Black Lagoon	1954	Gill-man	
The Creature Walks Among Us	1956	Gill-man	
The Creeping Terror	1964	Alien	
Creepshow	1982	Zombies, alien plants, yeti, cockroaches	
Critters	1986	Aliens	
Critters 2: The Main Course	1988	Aliens	
Crocodile	2000	Giant crocodile	
Crying Wolf 3D	2015	Werewolf, wolves	
Cujo	1983	Rabid dog	
The Curse of the Werewolf	1961	Werewolf	
Cursed	2005	Werewolves	
Cute Little Buggers 3D	2014	Rabbit	
Dagon	2001	Deep One	
Daimajin	1966	Daimajin	
Darkness	1993	Bats, vampires	
Dawn of the Beast	2021	Bigfoot, wendigos	
Dead Alive	1992	Zombies	
Dead Meat	2004	Zombiefied cows	
The Deadly Mantis	1957	Praying mantis	
The Deadly Spawn	1983	Aliens	
Dear God No!	2011	Sasquatch	
Death of a Unicorn	2025	Killer unicorns	
Deep Rising	1998	Giant octopus-like creature	
DeepStar Six	1989	Giant undersea creature	
Destroy All Monsters	1968	Godzilla / daikaiju	
Detective Pikachu	2019	Pokémon (Pocket Monsters)	
The Devil Bat	1940	Mutant bats	
Digging Up the Marrow	2014	Ghoul	
Doctor Blood's Coffin	1961	Zombie	
Dogora	1964	Jellyfish-like amorphous alien lifeform	
Dog Soldiers	2002	Werewolves	
Don't Be Afraid of the Dark	2010	Mysterious small creatures	
Doom	2005	Mutants	
The Dooms Chapel Horror	2015	Demons, ghoul	
Dreadtime Stories	2014	Ghoul	
D-War	2007	Dragons	
Dwellers	2021	Sewer creature	
Earth vs. the Spider	1958	Giant spider	
Eight Legged Freaks	2002	Giant spiders	
Exists	2014	Bigfoot	
Extinction	2014	Tyrannosaurus rex	
The Fiancé	2015	Bigfoot	
The Flesh Eaters	1964	Flesh-eating microbes	
Flu Bird Horror	2008	Mutant Birds	
The Fly	1958	Mutant man, spiders	
The Fly	1986	Mutant man	
Frankenfish	2004	Genetically engineered Snakehead fish	
Frankenstein Created Bikers	2015	Frankenstein's monster	
Freaked	1993	Mutant	
Freddy vs Jason	2003	Freddy Krueger, Jason Voorhees	
From Beyond	1986	Interdimensional mutant	
From the Dark	2014	Far darrig	
Frostbiter: Wrath of the Wendigo	1996	Wendigo	
Gamera	1965	Gamera / daikaiju	
Gamera 2: Attack of Legion	1996	Gamera / daikaiju	
Gamera 3: Revenge of Iris	1999	Gamera / daikaiju	
Gamera the Brave	2006	Gamera / daikaiju	
Gamera: Guardian of the Universe	1995	Gamera / daikaiju	
Gamera: Super Monster	1980	Gamera / daikaiju	
Gamera vs. Barugon	1966	Gamera / daikaiju	
Gamera vs. Guiron	1969	Gamera / daikaiju	
Gamera vs. Gyaos	1967	Gamera / daikaiju	
Gamera vs. Jiger	1970	Gamera / daikaiju	
Gamera vs. Viras	1968	Gamera / daikaiju	
Gamera vs. Zigra	1971	Gamera / daikaiju	
Gappa: The Triphibian Monster	1967	Bird-lizards / daikaiju	
Garuda	2004	Garuda / giant bird creature	
Gehenna	2016	Ghoul	
Ghidorah, the Three-Headed Monster	1964	Godzilla / daikaiju	
Ghost Rider	2007	Ghost Rider, Blackheart, Mephisto, other demons	
Ghost Rider: Spirit of Vengeance	2011	Ghost Rider, Mephisto	
Ghostkeeper	1981	Wendigo	
Ghoul	2014	Ghoul	
The Giant Behemoth	1959	Paleosaurus	
The Giant Claw	1957	Extraterrestrial prehistoric bird	
The Giant Gila Monster	1959	Beaded lizard	
The Giant Spider Invasion	1975	Giant spiders	
Godzilla	1954	Godzilla	
Godzilla	1998	Godzilla	
Godzilla	2014	Godzilla, MUTOs	
Godzilla 2000	1999	Godzilla / daikaiju	
Godzilla Against Mechagodzilla	2002	Godzilla / daikaiju / mecha	
Godzilla: City on the Edge of Battle	2018	Godzilla / daikaiju	
Godzilla: Final Wars	2004	Godzilla / daikaiju	
Godzilla: King of the Monsters	2019	Godzilla, Mothra, Rodan, King Ghidorah	
Godzilla Minus One	2023	Godzilla	
Godzilla Minus Zero	2026	Godzilla, King Ghidorah	
Godzilla, Mothra and King Ghidorah: Giant Monsters All-Out Attack	2001	Godzilla / daikaiju	
Godzilla: The Planet Eater	2018	Godzilla / daikaiju	
Godzilla: Planet of the Monsters	2017	Godzilla / daikaiju	
Godzilla Raids Again	1955	Godzilla / daikaiju	
Godzilla: Tokyo S.O.S.	2003	Godzilla / daikaiju / mecha	
Godzilla vs. Biollante	1989	Godzilla / daikaiju	
Godzilla vs. Destoroyah	1995	Godzilla / daikaiju	
Godzilla vs. Gigan	1972	Godzilla / daikaiju	
Godzilla vs. Hedorah	1971	Godzilla / daikaiju	
Godzilla vs. King Ghidorah	1991	Godzilla / daikaiju	
Godzilla vs. Kong	2021	King Kong, Godzilla, Mechagodzilla, Skullcrawler, Hollow Earth creatures	
Godzilla vs. Mechagodzilla	1974	Godzilla / daikaiju / mecha	
Godzilla vs. Mechagodzilla II	1993	Godzilla / daikaiju / mecha	
Godzilla vs. Megaguirus	2000	Godzilla / daikaiju	
Godzilla vs. Megalon	1973	Godzilla / daikaiju	
Godzilla vs. Mothra	1992	Godzilla / daikaiju	
Godzilla vs. The Sea Monster	1966	Godzilla / daikaiju	
Godzilla vs. SpaceGodzilla	1994	Godzilla / daikaiju / mecha	
Godzilla x Kong: The New Empire	2024	Godzilla, Kong, Scar King, Mothra	
Goosebumps	2015	Slappy the Dummy, giant praying mantis, werewolf, yeti, lawn gnomes	
Goosebumps 2: Haunted Halloween	2018	Slappy the Dummy, ogre, witches, ghosts	
Gorgo	1961	Sea monster	
Grabbers	2012	Giant tentacled creature	
Graveyard Shift	1990	Giant bat	
The Great Wall	2017	Taotie	
The Great Yokai War: Guardians	2021	Yokai	
Gremlins	1984	Gremlins	
Gremlins 2: The New Batch	1990	Gremlins	
The Grudge	2004	Onryō	
The Grudge 2	2006	Onryō	
The Grudge 3	2009	Onryō	
Half Human	1955	Abominable Snowman	
Helen Keller vs. Nightwolves	2015	Werewolf, bats	
The Hideous Sun Demon	1958	Mutant	
The Host	2006	Giant amphibious creature	
House	1985	Various	
Howl	2015	Werewolves	
The Howling	1981	Werewolf	
Hulk	2003	Hulk	
Hyena	2014	Hyena	
I am Legend	2007	Vampires	
I, Frankenstein	2014	Frankenstein's monster, demons, gargoyles	
The Incredible Hulk	2008	Hulk, Abomination	
Infernal	2015	Ghoul	
Insectula	2015	Giant spider, insectoid	
Invasion of Astro-Monster	1965	Godzilla / daikaiju	
Invaders from Mars	1986	Aliens	
The Invisible Man	1933	Invisible Man	
It	2017	Pennywise	
It Came from Beneath the Sea	1955	Radioactive octopus	
It Came From the Desert	2015	Giant ants	
It Chapter Two	2019	Pennywise	
It! The Terror from Beyond Space	1958	Martian	
It's Alive	1974	Mutated baby	
Jaani Dushman	1979	Snakes	
Jack Frost	1997	Living snowman	
Jack the Giant Killer	1962	Giants, witches, hobgoblins	
Jack the Giant Slayer	2013	giants	
Jennifer's Body	2009	Succubus	
Jinn	2014	Jinn	
Ju-On: The Curse	2000	Onryō	
Ju-On: The Curse 2	2000	Onryō	
Ju-On: The Grudge	2002	Onryō	
Ju-On: The Grudge 2	2003	Onryō	
Ju-On: Black Ghost	2009	Onryō	
Ju-On: White Ghost	2009	Onryō	
Ju-On: The Beginning of the End	2014	Onryō	
Ju-On: The Final Curse	2015	Onryō	
Jurassic City	2015	Dinosaurs; Tyrannosaurus rex	
Jurassic Park	1993	Numerous dinosaurs	
Jurassic Park III	2001	Numerous dinosaurs	
Jurassic World	2015	Genetically modified dinosaurs	
Jurassic World Dominion	2022	Numerous dinosaurs, genetically engineered locusts	
Jurassic World: Fallen Kingdom	2018	Numerous dinosaurs	
Jurassic World Rebirth	2025	Numerous dinosaurs, including mutants	
The Loch Ness Horror	1981	Loch Ness Monster	
The Lost World: Jurassic Park	1997	Numerous dinosaurs	
Khooni Panja	1991	Ghoul	
The Kindred	1987	Genetic hybrids	
King Kong	1933	King Kong, Dinosaurs	
King Kong	1976	King Kong	
King Kong	2005	King Kong	
King Kong Appears in Edo	1938	King Kong	
King Kong Escapes	1967	King Kong, Mechani-Kong, Gorosaurus	
King Kong Lives	1986	King Kong	
King Kong vs. Godzilla	1962	King Kong / Godzilla	
King of the Lost World	2005	Giant ape	
Kong: Skull Island	2017	King Kong, Skullcrawlers	
Konga	1961	Giant gorilla	
Konga TNT	2020	Giant gorilla	
Kraken	2026	Kraken	
Krampus	2015	Krampus	
Lake Effect	2015	Yeti	
Lake Placid	1999	Giant crocodile	
Lake Placid 2	2007	Giant crocodile	
Lake Placid 3	2007	Giant crocodiles	
Lake Placid: The Final Chapter	2012	Giant crocodiles	
Lake Placid: Legacy	2018	Giant crocodile	
Lake Placid vs. Anaconda	2015	Crocodile and anaconda	
Leprechaun	1993	Leprechaun	
The Leviathan	2015	Leviathan	
Life	2017	Alien life form	
Love and Monsters	2020	Numerous monsters	
Love in the Time of Monsters	2015	Bigfoot	
The Mad Monster	1942	Werewolf	
Malignant	2021	Supernatural theratoma	
Mama	2013	Revenant	
Man-Thing	2005	Man-Thing (swamp monster)	
Meatball Machine	2005	Mutant	
The Meg	2018	Megalodon	
Meg 2: The Trench	2023	megalodons, Giant Octopus, Kronosaurus, Tyrannosaurus rex,	
Mega Shark Versus Crocosaurus	2010	Shark and crocodile	
Mega Shark Versus Giant Octopus	2009	Shark and octopus	
Mega Shark Versus Mecha Shark	2014	Shark	
The Midnight Meat Train	2008	Reptilians	
Mighty Joe Young	1949	Giant gorilla	
Mighty Joe Young	1998	Giant gorilla	
The Mighty Kong	1998	King Kong	
Minions & Monsters	2026	Various	
Minotaur	2006	Minotaur	
Minotaur	2006	Minotaur	
Monster	2008	Giant octopus	
The Monster	2016	Undefined creature	
Monster Brawl	2011	Cyclops, swamp monster, Frankenstein's monster, vampire, mummy, witch, werewolf, zombie	
A Monster Calls	2016	giant anthropomorphic yew tree	
The Monster Club	1981	Vampires, Shadmock, ghouls	
Monster Hunt	2015	Numerous monsters	
Monster Hunt 2	2018	Numerous monsters	
Monster Hunter	2020	Numerous monsters	
Monster in the Closet	1986	Boogeyman	
Monster Island	2019	Multiple giant monsters	
The Monster That Challenged the World	1957	Giant molluscs	
Monsters	2010	Six-legged, tentacled beast	
Monsters: Dark Continent	2014	Six-legged, tentacled beast	
Morbius	2022	Living vampires; Michael Morbius, Milo Morbius	
Mothra	1961	Daikaiju / Mothra	
Mothra vs. Godzilla	1964	Godzilla / daikaiju	
Night of the Lepus	1972	giant mutated rabbits	
Night of the Living Dead	1968	Zombies	
The Night Watchmen	2015	Bats, vampire	
Nightbreed	1990	Shapeshifter	
Nightlight	2014	Demon	
Nope	2022	Alien	
Notzilla	2020	Daikaiju / Godzilla parody	
The Nun	2018	Demon	
Orochi, the Eight-Headed Dragon	1994	Yamata no Orochi / dragon	
Outlander	2008	Moorwen	
P-51 Dragon Fighter	2014	Dragon	
Pacific Rim	2013	Daikaiju / mecha	
Pacific Rim: Uprising	2018	Daikaiju / mecha	
Pan's Labyrinth	2006	Faun, Pale Man, other magical creatures	
Piranhaconda	2012	Mutant half-shark/half-octopus creature and killer whale/wolf hybrid	
The Pit	1981	Troglodyte	
Predator	1987	Predator	
The Predator	2018	Predator	
Predator 2	1990	Predator	
Predator: Badlands	2025	Predator, Kalisk	
Prey	2022	Predator	
The Possession	2012	Demon	
Primeval	2007	Crocodile	
Prophecy	1979	Giant mutant bear	
Pulgasari	1985	Pulgasari / daikaiju	
Pumpkinhead	1988	Demon	
Puppet Master	1989	Killer toys	
The Pyramid	2014	Anubis	
Q	1982	Aztec god Quetzalcoatl, depicted as a giant winged lizard	
Queen Kong	1976	Giant gorilla	
A Quiet Place	2018	Death Angels	
Rampage	2018	Three giant monsters - George the Gorilla, Lizzie the Alligator, Ralph the Wolf	
Rats: Night of Terror	1984	Rats	
Rawhead Rex	1986	Demon	
Rebirth of Mothra	1996	Daikaiju / giant moth	
Rebirth of Mothra II	1997	Daikaiju / giant moth	
Rebirth of Mothra III	1998	Daikaiju / giant moth	
Reign of Fire	2002	Dragons	
Reign of the Gargoyles	2007	Gargoyle	
The Relic	1997	Kothoga	
Reptilicus	1961	Prehistoric reptile	
The Return of Godzilla	1984	Godzilla / daikaiju	
The Return of Swamp Thing	1989	Mutated humanoid swamp creature	
The Return of the Living Dead	1985	Zombies	
Revenge of the Creature	1955	Gill-man	
The Ritual	2017	Jotunn	
Rodan	1956	Rodan	
Scary or Die	2012	Zombies, vampires, were-clowns	
The Sea Bat	1930	Manta ray	
The Sea Beast	1926	Sperm whale	
The Sea Beast	2022	Red Bluster (giant sea creature)	
Sexcula	2014	Vampires, bats	
The Shape of Water	2017	Humanoid aquatic creature	
Shapeshifter	2005	Shapeshifter	
Sharktopus	2010	Mutant half-shark/half-octopus creature	
Sharktopus vs. Pteracuda	2014	Mutant half-shark/half-octopus creature and barracuda-pterodactyl hybrid creature known	
Sharktopus vs. Whalewolf	2015	Mutant half-shark/half-octopus creature and killer whale/wolf hybrid	
Sharp Fangs in the Forest	1986	Giant man-eating crocodile	
Shin Godzilla	2016	Godzilla	
Shivers	1975	Sexually transmitted parasite	
Silver Bullet	1985	Werewolf	
SilverHide	2015	Werewolf	
The Slayer	1982	Supernatural beast, skeletal creature (unknown)	
Slender Man	2018	Slender Man	
Snakeman	2005	Giant five-headed snake	
Son of Godzilla	1967	Godzilla / daikaiju	
Son of Kong	1933	King Kong, dinosaurs	
Space Amoeba	1970	Daikaiju	
Species	1995	Extraterrestrial / human hybrid	
S.S. Doomtrooper	2006	Mutant	
Strawstalker	2026	Scarecrow	
The Suckling	1990	Mutated fetus	
Swamp Thing	1982	Mutated humanoid swamp creature	
Tales from the Darkside: The Movie	1990	Mummy, black cat, gargoyle	
Tarantula	1955	Giant tarantula	
The Thing	1982	The Thing (alien monster)	
The Thing	2011	The Thing (alien monster)	
Tentacles	1977	Octopus	
Terror In the Swamp	1985	Lab experiment gone wrong	
Terror of Mechagodzilla	1975	Godzilla / daikaiju / mecha	
TerrorVision	1986	Mutated extraterrestrial	
Them!	1954	Giant ants	
The Tingler	1959	Fear-eating parasite	
Tokyo Gore Police	2008	Mutants	
The Tomorrow War	2021	White Spikes	
The Toxic Avenger	1984	Mutant	
Tremors	1990	Graboids	
Tremors 2: Aftershocks	1996	Graboids	
Tremors 3: Back to Perfection	2001	Graboids	
Tremors 4: The Legend Begins	2004	Graboids	
Tremors 5: Bloodlines	2015	Graboids	
Tremors: A Cold Day in Hell	2018	Graboids	
Tremors: Shrieker Island	2020	Graboids	
Troll	1986	Troll	
Troll	2022	Troll	
Troll 2	1990	Goblins	
Trollhunter	2010	Trolls	
Underwater	2020	Cthulhu, humanoid sea creatures	
Unnatural	2015	Polar bears	
V/H/S	2012	Zombies, demons, glitch, aliens	
Vampirella	1996	Vampire	
Van Helsing	2004	Vampires, werewolves, Frankenstein's monster, Mr. Hyde	
The Valley of Gwangi	1969	Allosaurus	
Varan	1958	Varan / giant lizard	
Venom	2018	Venom, Riot	
Venom: Let There Be Carnage	2021	Venom, Carnage	
Venom: The Last Dance	2024	Venom, Toxin, Knull	
The War of the Gargantuas	1966	Daikaiju	
The Water Horse: Legend of the Deep	2007	Crusoe (Loch Ness Monster)	
The Werewolf of Washington	1973	Werewolf	
Werewolves	2024	Werewolves	
Werewolves of the Third Reich	2017	Werewolf	
Werewolves Within	2021	Werewolves	
What We Do in the Shadows	2014	Bats, vampires	
The Wild Man of the Navidad	2008	Bigfoot	
Willow Creek	2013	Sasquatch	
Wind Walkers	2015	Vampires, bats	
WolfCop	2014	Werewolf	
Wolfen	1981	Native American wolf spirits	
The Wolf Man	1941	Werewolf	
Wolf Man	2025	Werewolf	
The Wolfman	2010	Werewolves	
Wolves	2014	Werewolf	
Wrath of the Titans	2012	Monsters from Greek mythology	
Wrestlemaniac	2006	Flesh construct	
The X from Outer Space	1966	Guilala / daikaiju	
The Yeti	2026	Yeti	
Yongary, Monster from the Deep	1967	Yonggary	
Yonggary	1999	Yonggary	
Zombeavers	2014	Mutated beavers	
Zombieworld	2015	Genetically modified apes	

== See also ==
- List of films featuring giant monsters

== Bibliography ==
- Sala, Ángel (October 2005). "Apéndices". Tiburón ¡Vas a necesitar un barco más grande! El filme que cambió Hollywood (1st ed.). Festival Internacional de Cinema de Catalunya. p. 141. ISBN 84-96129-72-1.
