= List of films featuring giant monsters =

This is an alphabetical list of films featuring giant monsters, including the kaiju subgenre.

== Overview ==
One of the first films involving giant monsters was the 1933 classic King Kong, as developments in cinema and animation enabled the creation of realistic giant creatures. The film influenced many giant-monster films in its wake, including many produced in Japan. Two of the earliest of these were The Great Buddha Arrival from 1934 and 1938's The King Kong That Appeared in Edo, both of which are now presumed to be lost films. The visual effects in King Kong, created by Willis O'Brien, inspired future monster film effects artists such as Ray Harryhausen and Dennis Muren. Early giant-monster films often had themes of adventure and exploration of unknown regions, and incorporated fights with giant monsters as a climactic element.

The development of atomic weaponry in the 1940s gave rise to its involvement in popular themes. The 1953 American film The Beast from 20,000 Fathoms featured a giant dinosaur that awakens due to nuclear tests in the Arctic. The 1954 film Them! involved giant irradiated ants. Later in 1954, the Japanese film Godzilla was released, followed by Rodan in 1956. This was at a time when giant creatures created by nuclear radiation became popular. Japan continued with a giant moth in Mothra, a turtle in Gamera, and many more that followed. Other countries have their own giant monster movies such as the United Kingdom and Denmark with Gorgo and Reptilicus, both released in 1961.

Films featuring Godzilla and Gamera were made into the 1970s, and a King Kong remake was released in 1976. Awareness of toxic waste and the growth of the environmental movement in the 1970s inspired the release of various horror films, and the giant monster subgenre saw the release of 1971's Godzilla vs. Hedorah, in which the themes of pollution and environmentalism were incorporated into the series. Following a second series of films in the 1980s and 1990s, Godzilla received a 1998 remake by TriStar Pictures, while King Kong received a 2005 remake by Universal Pictures. 2008 saw the release of the successful Cloverfield, which some critics have claimed took inspiration from the September 11 attacks. Pacific Rim, a film featuring giant mecha battling with kaiju, was released in 2013, and the following year Legendary reinterpreted Godzilla for a new generation of audiences in the series' 30th film. The first Japanese film in the Godzilla series after a ten year long hiatus, Shin Godzilla, premiered in Japan in July 2016. A reboot of King Kong known as Kong: Skull Island was released in March 2017. Two other Godzilla films were released subsequently, with Godzilla: King of the Monsters releasing in 2019 and Godzilla vs. Kong releasing in 2021. Toho’s latest Godzilla film, Godzilla Minus One, premiered in Japan in 2023. Legendary would release Godzilla x Kong: The New Empire in 2024, and is currently producing Godzilla x Kong: Supernova.

== List of films ==
Name	Year	Country	Description	Ref.
20 Million Miles to Earth	1957	United States	Extraterrestrial from Venus	
2-Headed Shark Attack	2012	United States	Two-headed shark	
3-Headed Shark Attack	2015	United States	Three-headed shark	
5-Headed Shark Attack	2017	United States	Five-headed shark	
The 7th Voyage of Sinbad	1958	United States	Cyclops, dragon, roc	
The 30 Foot Bride of Candy Rock	1959	United States	Giantess	
47 Ronin	2013	United States	Kirin, Mizuki (as a dragon)	
Alice in Wonderland	2010	United States	Jabberwocky	
All Monsters Attack	1969	Japan	Godzilla / daikaiju	
Alligator	1980	United States	Giant alligator	
Always: Sunset on Third Street 2	2007	Japan	Godzilla / daikaiju	
Anaconda	1997	United States	Giant anaconda	
Anaconda	2025	United States	Giant anaconda	
Anacondas: The Hunt for the Blood Orchid	2004	United States	Giant anacondas	
Anaconda 3: Offspring	2008	United States	Giant anacondas	
Anacondas: Trail of Blood	2009	United States	Giant anacondas	
Ape	1976	South Korea, United States	Giant gorilla, giant snake, giant shark	
Aqua Teen Hunger Force Colon Movie Film for Theaters	2007	United States	Insanoflex / robot	
Aquaman	2018	United States	Karathen (giant sea creature)	
The Arctic Giant	1942	United States	Dinosaur-esque monster	
Atragon	1963	Japan	Manda / daikaiju	
Attack of the 50 Foot Cheerleader	2012	United States	Giantess	
Attack of the 50 Foot Woman	1958	United States	Giantess	
Attack of the 50 Ft. Woman	1993	United States	Giantess	
Attack of the 60 Foot Centerfold	1995	United States	Giantess	
Attack of the Crab Monsters	1958	United States	Giant crabs	
Attack on Titan	2015	Japan	Giants / Titans	
The Avengers	2012	United States	Chitauri Leviathans	
Avengers: Endgame	2019	United States	Chitauri Leviathans	
Avengers: Infinity War	2018	United States	Chitauri Leviathans	
The Beast from 20,000 Fathoms	1953	United States	Rhedosaurus	
The Beast of Hollow Mountain	1956	United States	Tyrannosaurus rex	
Beginning of the End	1957	United States	Radioactive grasshoppers	
Beyond Skyline	2017	United States	Tanker aliens	
The BFG	2016	United States	Giants	
Big Ass Spider!	2013	United States	Giant spider	
Big Man Japan	2008	Japan	Daikaiju	
The Black Scorpion	1957	United States	Giant scorpion	
The Blob	1958	United States	Blob	
The Blob	1988	United States	Blob	
Bulgasari	1962	South Korea	Bulgasari / daikaiju	
Caltiki – The Immortal Monster	1959	Italy, France	Blob-like monster	
Clash of the Titans	1981	United States, United Kingdom	Kraken	
Clash of the Titans	2010	United States, United Kingdom	Monsters from Greek mythology	
Cloverfield	2008	United States	Clover	
The Cloverfield Paradox	2018	United States	Clover	
Colossal	2016	Canada/Spain	Unknown creature	
Conan the Barbarian	1982	United States	Giant snake	
Crocodile	2000	United States	Giant crocodile	
Daimajin	1966	Japan	Daimajin	
Daimajin Strikes Again	1966	Japan	Daimajin	
The Deadly Mantis	1957	United States	Praying mantis	
Deadpool & Wolverine	2024	United States	Alioth	
Deep Rising	1998	United States	Giant octopus-like creature	
DeepStar Six	1989	United States	Giant undersea creature	
Destroy All Monsters	1968	Japan	Godzilla, Mothra, King Ghidorah, Rodan, Anguirus, Kumonga, Minilla, Baragon, Varan, Gorosaurus, Manda	
Detective Pikachu	2019	United States	Giant Torterras	
Dinosaur from the Deep	1993	France	Dinosaurs	
Doctor Strange in the Multiverse of Madness	2022	United States	Gargantos	
Dogora	1964	Japan	Jellyfish-like amorphous alien lifeform	
Dune	1984	United States	Sandworms (giant worms)	
Dune	2021	United States	Sandworms (giant worms)	
Dune: Part Two	2024	United States	Sandworms (giant worms)	
D-War	2007	South Korea, United States	Buraki, good imoogi	
Earth vs. the Spider	1958	United States	Giant spider	
Ebirah: Horror of the Deep	1966	Japan	Godzilla, Ebirah, Mothra	
The Empire Strikes Back	1980	United States	Exogorth (giant slug)	
Eight Legged Freaks	2002	United States, Germany, Australia	Giant spiders	
Caravan of Courage: An Ewok Adventure	1984	United States	Gorax	
The Flash	2023	United States	Thanagarian Snare Beast	
The Food of the Gods	1976	United States	Giant Rats	
Galaxy Quest	1999	United States	Gorignak (rock monster)	
Gamera	1965	Japan	Gamera / daikaiju	
Gamera 2: Attack of Legion	1996	Japan	Gamera / daikaiju	
Gamera 3: Revenge of Iris	1999	Japan	Gamera / daikaiju	
Gamera: Guardian of the Universe	1995	Japan	Gamera / daikaiju	
Gamera: Super Monster	1980	Japan	Gamera / daikaiju	
Gamera the Brave	2006	Japan	Gamera / daikaiju	
Gamera vs. Barugon	1966	Japan	Gamera / daikaiju	
Gamera vs. Guiron	1969	Japan	Gamera / daikaiju	
Gamera vs. Gyaos	1967	Japan	Gamera / daikaiju	
Gamera vs. Jiger	1970	Japan	Gamera / daikaiju	
Gamera vs. Viras	1968	Japan	Gamera / daikaiju	
Gamera vs. Zigra	1971	Japan	Gamera / daikaiju	
Gappa: The Triphibian Monster	1967	Japan	Bird-lizards / daikaiju	
Gargantua	1998	United States	Prehistoric creature	
Garuda	2004	Thailand	Garuda / giant bird creature	
Ghidorah, the Three-Headed Monster	1964	Japan	Godzilla / daikaiju	
Ghostbusters	1984	United States	Stay Puft Marshmallow Man	
The Giant Behemoth	1959	United Kingdom, United States	Palaeosaurus	
The Giant Claw	1957	United States	Extraterrestrial prehistoric bird	
The Giant Gila Monster	1959	United States	Beaded lizard	
The Giant Spider Invasion	1975	United States	Giant spiders	
Godzilla/Godzilla, King of the Monsters!/Godzilla	1954/1956/1977	Japan/Japan, United States/Japan, Italy	Godzilla	
Godzilla	1998	United States, Japan	Godzilla	
Godzilla	2014	United States	Godzilla, MUTOs	
Godzilla 2000: Millennium	1999	Japan	Godzilla / daikaiju	
Godzilla Against Mechagodzilla	2002	Japan	Godzilla / daikaiju / mecha	
Godzilla: City on the Edge of Battle	2018	Japan	Godzilla / daikaiju / mecha	
Godzilla: Final Wars	2004	Japan, United States, China, Australia	Godzilla / daikaiju	
Godzilla: King of the Monsters	2019	United States	Godzilla, Mothra, Rodan, King Ghidorah	
Godzilla Minus One	2023	Japan	Godzilla	
Godzilla Minus Zero	2026	Japan	Godzilla, King Ghidorah	
Godzilla, Mothra and King Ghidorah: Giant Monsters All-Out Attack	2001	Japan	Godzilla / daikaiju	
Godzilla: The Planet Eater	2018	Japan	Godzilla / daikaiju / mecha	
Godzilla: Planet of the Monsters	2017	Japan	Godzilla / daikaiju / mecha	
Godzilla Raids Again	1955	Japan	Godzilla / daikaiju	
Godzilla: Tokyo S.O.S.	2003	Japan	Godzilla / daikaiju / mecha	
Godzilla vs. Biollante	1989	Japan	Godzilla / daikaiju	
Godzilla vs. Destoroyah	1995	Japan	Godzilla / daikaiju	
Godzilla vs. Gigan	1972	Japan	Godzilla / daikaiju / cyborg	
Godzilla vs. Hedorah	1971	Japan	Godzilla / daikaiju	
Godzilla vs. King Ghidorah	1991	Japan	Godzilla / daikaiju / mecha	
Godzilla vs. Kong	2021	United States	Kong / Godzilla / Mechagodzilla	
Godzilla vs. Mechagodzilla	1974	Japan	Godzilla / daikaiju / mecha	
Godzilla vs. Mechagodzilla II	1993	Japan	Godzilla / daikaiju / mecha / cyborg	
Godzilla vs. Megaguirus	2000	Japan	Godzilla / daikaiju	
Godzilla vs. Megalon	1973	Japan	Godzilla / daikaiju / mecha	
Godzilla vs. Mothra	1992	Japan	Godzilla / daikaiju	
Godzilla vs. SpaceGodzilla	1994	Japan	Godzilla / daikaiju / mecha	
Godzilla x Kong: The New Empire	2024	United States	Godzilla, Kong, Skar King, Shimo, Suko, Mothra, Doug, Wart dog, Tiamat, Scylla	
Gogola	1966	India	Sea monster	
Goosebumps	2015	United States	Giant praying mantis	
Gorgo	1961	Ireland, United Kingdom, United States	Sea monster	
Grabbers	2012	Ireland, United Kingdom	Tentacles	
Graveyard Shift	1990	United States	Giant bat	
The Great Buddha Arrival	1934	Japan	Buddha statue	
Guardians of the Galaxy Vol. 2	2017	United States	Abilisk	
Half Human	1955	Japan	Abominable Snowman	
He's a Dragon	2015	Russia	Dragon	
Helluva Good Luck	1999	Czech Republic	Dragon	
Helluva Good Luck 2	2001	Czech Republic	Dragon	
The Hobbit	1977	United States	Smaug (a dragon)	
The Hobbit: An Unexpected Journey	2012	United States	Smaug (a dragon)	
The Hobbit: The Desolation of Smaug	2013	United States	Smaug	
The Hobbit: The Battle of the Five Armies	2014	United States	Smaug	
The Host	2006	South Korea	Amphibious	
Hotel Transylvania 3: Summer Vacation	2018	United States	Kraken	
Ice Age: Dawn of the Dinosaurs	2009	United States	Momma Dino (a Tyrannosaurus), Rudy (a Baryonyx)	
The Ice Age Adventures of Buck Wild	2022	United States	Momma Dino (a Tyrannosaurus)	
Ilya Muromets	1956	Soviet Union	Dragon	
Invasion of Astro-Monster	1965	Japan, United States	Godzilla, Rodan, King Ghidorah	
It Came from Beneath the Sea	1955	United States	Radioactive octopus	
It Came From the Desert	2015	United States	Giant ants	
Jack the Giant Slayer	2013	United States	Giants	
Journey 2: The Mysterious Island	2012	United States	Giant lizard	
Journey to the Beginning of Time	1955	Czechoslovakia	Dinosaurs	
The Jungle Book	2016	United States	King Louie (Gigantopithecus)	
Jurassic Park	1993	United States	Numerous dinosaurs	
Jurassic Park III	2001	United States	Numerous dinosaurs	
Jurassic World	2015	United States	Genetically modified dinosaurs	
Jurassic World Dominion	2022	United States	Numerous dinosaurs	
Jurassic World: Fallen Kingdom	2018	United States	Numerous dinosaurs	
Jurassic World Rebirth	2025	United States	Numerous dinosaurs	
Kamen Rider: Beyond Generations	2021	Japan	Kaiju	
King Dinosaur	1955	United States	Tyrannosaurus rex	
King Kong	1933	United States	King Kong	
King Kong	1976	United States	King Kong	
King Kong	2005	United States, New Zealand	King Kong	
King Kong Appears in Edo	1938	Japan	King Kong	
King Kong Escapes	1967	Japan, United States	King Kong, Mechani-Kong, Gorosaurus	
King Kong Lives	1986	United States	King Kong	
King of the Lost World	2005	United States	Giant ape	
King Kong vs. Godzilla	1962	Japan, United States	King Kong / Godzilla	
Konga	1961	United Kingdom	Giant gorilla	
Konga TNT	2022	Canada	Giant gorilla	
Kong: Skull Island	2017	United States	Kong, Skullcrawlers	
Kraken	2026	Norway	Kraken	
Lake Placid	1999	United States	Giant crocodile	
Lake Placid 2	2007	United States	Giant crocodile	
Lake Placid 3	2010	United States	Giant crocodiles	
Lake Placid: The Final Chapter	2012	United States	Giant crocodiles	
Lake Placid: Legacy	2018	United States	Giant crocodile	
Lake Placid vs. Anaconda	2015	United States	Crocodile and anaconda	
Land of the Lost	2009	United States	Grumpy (a Tyrannosaurus), Big Alice (an Allosaurus)	
The Loch Ness Horror	1981	United States	Loch Ness Monster	
The Lego Batman Movie	2017	United States	King Kong	
Legend of the White Horse	1987	Poland, United States	Dragon	
The Lost World	1925	United States	Numerous dinosaurs	
The Lost World: Jurassic Park	1997	United States	Numerous dinosaurs	
Love and Monsters	2020	United States	Numerous dinosaurs	
Maleficent	2014	United States	Diaval (as a dragon)	
Maleficent: Mistress of Evil	2019	United States	Maleficent (as a phoenix)	
Mammoth	2006	United States	Alien/woolly mammoth	
The Mandalorian and Grogu	2026	United States	Dragonsnake	
The Meg	2018	United States/China	Megalodon	
Meg 2: The Trench	2023	United States/China	Megalodon, giant octopus, Kronosaurus, Tyrannosaurus rex	
Mega Shark Versus Crocosaurus	2010	United States	Shark and crocodile	
Mega Shark Versus Giant Octopus	2009	United States	Giant shark and giant octopus	
Mega Shark Versus Mecha Shark	2014	United States	Giant shark	
Mighty Joe Young	1949	United States	Giant gorilla	
Mighty Joe Young	1998	United States	Giant gorilla	
The Mighty Kong	1998	United States	King Kong	
The Mighty Peking Man	1977	Hong Kong	Peking Man / Yeti	
The Mist	2007	United States	Various	
Monster	2008	United States	Giant octopus	
A Monster Calls	2016	UK	Giant anthropomorphic yew tree	
Monster Hunter	2020	United States	Numerous monsters	
The Monster That Challenged the World	1957	United States	Giant molluscs	
Monsters	2010	United Kingdom	Six-legged, tentacled beast	
Monsters: Dark Continent	2014	United Kingdom	Six-legged, tentacled beast	
Monsters vs. Aliens	2009	United States	Various	
Mothra	1961	Japan	Daikaiju / giant moth	
Mothra vs. Godzilla	1964	Japan	Godzilla / daikaiju	
Night of the Lepus	1972	United States	Giant mutated rabbits	
Notzilla	2020	United States	Daikaiju / Godzilla parody	
On the Comet	1970	Czechoslovakia	Dinosaurs, sea monster	
Orochi, the Eight-Headed Dragon	1994	Japan	Yamata no Orochi / dragon	
Outlander	2008	United States	Moorwen	
Pacific Rim	2013	United States, Mexico	Daikaiju / mecha	
Pacific Rim: Uprising	2018	United States	Daikaiju / mecha	
Piranhaconda	2012	United States	Mutant half-shark/half-octopus creature and killer whale/wolf hybrid	
Predator: Badlands	2025	United States	Kalisk	
Primeval	2007	United States	Crocodile	
Princ Bajaja	1971	Czechoslovakia	Dragon	
Princess Mononoke	1997	Japan	Forest spirits and gods	
Pulgasari	1985	North Korea	Pulgasari / daikaiju	
Q	1982	United States	Aztec god Quetzalcoatl, depicted as a giant winged lizard	
The Quatermass Xperiment	1955	United Kingdom	Mutated Carroon's last form	
Queen Kong	1976	United Kingdom, West Germany	Giant gorilla	
Ralph Breaks the Internet	2018	United States	Giant Ralph Monster	
Rampage	2018	United States	George the Gorilla, Lizzie the Alligator, Ralph the Wolf	
Ready Player One	2018	United States	King Kong, Mechagodzilla, Tyrannosaurus	
Rebirth of Mothra	1996	Japan	Daikaiju / giant moth	
Rebirth of Mothra II	1997	Japan	Daikaiju / giant moth	
Rebirth of Mothra III	1998	Japan	Daikaiju / giant moth	
Reign of Fire	2002	United Kingdom, Ireland, United States	Wyverns	
Reptilicus	1961	Denmark, United States	Prehistoric reptile	
Return of Daimajin	1966	Japan	Daimajin	
The Return of Godzilla/Godzilla 1985	1984/1985	Japan/Japan, United States	Godzilla / daikaiju	
Return of the Jedi	1983	United States	Rancor, Sarlacc	
Rock Monster	2008	United States	Rock monster	
Rodan	1956	Japan	Flying daikaiju, irradiated Pteranodon	
Rumble	2021	United States	Rayburn Jr., Tentacular, many other kaiju	
Scooby-Doo and the Loch Ness Monster	2004	United States	Loch Ness Monster	
Scooby-Doo! and the Reluctant Werewolf	1988	United States	Genghis Kong	
Scooby-Doo! Legend of the Phantosaur	2011	United States	Phantosaur	
The Sea Beast	2022	United States	Red Bluster (giant sea creature)	
Sharktopus	2010	United States	Mutant half-shark/half-octopus creature	
Sharktopus vs. Pteracuda	2014	United States	Mutant half-shark/half-octopus creature and barracuda-pterodactyl hybrid creature known	
Sharktopus vs. Whalewolf	2015	United States	Mutant half-shark/half-octopus creature and killer whale/wolf hybrid	
Shin Godzilla	2016	Japan	Godzilla	
Shin Ultraman	2022	Japan	Kaiju	
Skyline	2010	United States	Tanker alien	
Skylines	2020	United States	Tanker alien	
Sleeping Beauty	1959	United States	Maleficent (as a dragon)	
Snakeman	2005	United States	Giant five-headed snake	
Snow Dragon	2013	Czech Republic	Dragon	
Son of Godzilla	1967	Japan	Godzilla, minilla, others	
Son of Kong	1933	United States	Giant ape	
Space Amoeba	1970	Japan	Daikaiju	
Space Jam: A New Legacy	2021	United States	King Kong	
Space Monster, Wangmagwi	1967	South Korea	Extraterrestrial daikaiju	
Spider-Man	1978	Japan	Swordfish	
Star Wars: Episode I – The Phantom Menace	1999	United States	Sando Aqua Monster	
The Story of Voyages	1983	Soviet Union, Czechoslovakia, Romania	Dragon	
The Suicide Squad	2021	United States	Starro	
Super 8	2011	United States	Alien	
Superman	2025	United States	Kaiju	
Tarantula	1955	United States	Giant tarantula	
Teen Titans Go! vs. Teen Titans	2019	United States	The Unkindness, Hexagon	
Tentacles	1977	Italy, United States	Octopus	
Terror of Mechagodzilla	1975	Japan	Godzilla / daikaiju / mecha	
Teenage Mutant Ninja Turtles: Mutant Mayhem	2023	United States	Superfly	
Them!	1954	United States	Radioactive ants	
This Is the End	2013	United States	Satan	
Thor	2011	United States	Frost Beast	
Thor: The Dark World	2013	United States	Frost Beast	
Thor: Ragnarok	2017	United States	Surtur, Fenris, dragon	
Tom and Jerry: The Lost Dragon	2014	United States	Puffy's mother (a dragon), Drizelda (as a dragon)	
Transformers: Revenge of the Fallen	2009	United States	Devastator, Demolishor	
Transformers: Age of Extinction	2014	United States	Grimlock (a robotic Tyrannosaurus), Scorn (Spinosaurus), Slug (Triceratops), Strafe (Pteranodon)	
Transformers: The Last Knight	2017	United States	Grimlock, Dragonstorm	
Tremors	1990	United States	Graboids	
Tremors 2: Aftershocks	1996	United States	Graboids	
Tremors 3: Back to Perfection	2001	United States	Graboids	
Tremors 4: The Legend Begins	2004	United States	Graboids	
Tremors 5: Bloodlines	2015	United States	Graboids	
Tremors: A Cold Day in Hell	2018	United States	Graboids	
Tremors: Shrieker Island	2020	United States	Graboids	
Troll	2022	Norway	Troll	
Trollhunter	2010	Norway	Troll (Tusseladd, Jotnar)	
Turning Red	2022	United States	Ming (as a red panda)	
Ultra Galaxy Fight: The Destined Crossroad	2022	Japan	Kaiju	
Ultraman: Rising	2024	United States, Japan	Gigantron, Emi	
Ultraman Decker Finale: Journey to Beyond	2023	Japan	Kaiju	
Ultraman: Monster Movie Feature	1967	Japan	Kaiju	
Ultraman Trigger: Episode Z	2022	Japan	Kaiju	
Under Paris	2024	France	Mutant shark	
Underwater	2020	United States	Cthulhu	
The Valley of Gwangi	1969	United States	Allosaurus	
Varan the Unbelievable	1958	Japan	Varan, giant lizard, daikaiju	
Wallace & Gromit: The Curse of the Were-Rabbit	2005	United Kingdom	Wallace transforms into a Were Rabbit	
The Water Horse: Legend of the Deep	2007	United States, United Kingdom, New Zealand	Crusoe (Loch Ness Monster)	
The War of the Gargantuas	1966	Japan	Daikaiju	
What to Do with the Dead Kaiju?	2022	Japan	Daikaiju	
World Without End	1956	United States	Mutated spiders	
Wrath of the Titans	2012	United States, United Kingdom, Spain	Monsters from Greek mythology	
The X from Outer Space	1967	Japan	Guilala / daikaiju	
Yeti: Giant of the 20th Century	1977	Italy, Canada	Yeti	
Yonggary	1999	South Korea	Yonggary	
Yongary, Monster from the Deep	1967	South Korea	Yonggary	
Za humny je drak	1982	Czechoslovakia	Dragon	
Zarkorr! The Invader	1996	United States	Daikaiju	

== See also ==
- List of films featuring dinosaurs
- List of monster movies
- List of dragons in film and television
