= Lake Placid (film series) =

Comedy horror film series

- Cover for the Scream Factory Blu-ray re-release of the original film
- Created by: David E. Kelley
- Original work: Lake Placid (1999)
- Owner: Sony Pictures Entertainment
- Years: 1999–2018

Films and television
- Film: Lake Placid (1999)
- Television films: Lake Placid 2 (2007); Lake Placid 3 (2010); Lake Placid: The Final Chapter (2012); Lake Placid vs. Anaconda (2015); Lake Placid: Legacy (2018)

Games
- Video games: Lake Placid: Croc Drop (1999); Lake Placid 2: Croc Alley (2007)

Lake Placid is a series of American natural horror films created by David E. Kelley. The series began with Lake Placid (1999) directed by Steve Miner, and was followed by five television sequels, Lake Placid 2 (2007) by David Flores, Lake Placid 3 (2010) by Griff Furst, Lake Placid: The Final Chapter (2012) by Don Michael Paul, Lake Placid vs. Anaconda (2015) by A.B. Stone, being a crossover with the Anaconda film series, and Lake Placid: Legacy (2018) by Darrell Roodt. Each installment revolves around the presence of giant man-eating crocodiles in the fictional location of Black Lake, Maine, and the efforts of various groups to capture or destroy the creatures. All of the films (except for Legacy) reference members of the fictitious Bickerman family.

== Background ==
During the production of the original film, Stan Winston Studios were hired to produce the 30 foot long animatronic crocodile, which was covered in a water-resistant urethane skin and functioned underwater using waterproofed hydraulics. In 2014, following the re-release of the original film on Blu-ray, Daily Dead interviewed director Steve Miner about the production of the film. According to Miner: "The first thing I did when I got on board Lake Placid was send the script over to Stan. Stan went ahead and began building the main 18-20 foot croc out of pocket even before we had locked down our financing or anything like that. He may have spent close to a million dollars on him- it may not have been that much, but it was close. And that’s such a testament to Stan- I kept telling him that I didn’t even know if we were going to be making the darned movie, but he just kept moving ahead. What I didn’t know when I took on Lake Placid was that it had already been turned down by all the studios so when it came time to put the movie together, it was a little more challenging than I originally thought it was going to be. That’s when I brought in Mike Medavoy and he really got this movie done for us. We started making the rounds again and eventually Fox ended up picking up the movie the second time. Mike then brought these French investors over to Stan’s shop to see the crocodile in action and Stan finished that thing up just in the nick of time. It ended up working out so perfectly though because Stan had the croc working perfectly where his jaws would open and close, his eyes and head were able to move around and he could move the other parts and shake him like he was attacking something. That’s what ended up impressing the investors and it’s because of Stan that we were able to finance Lake Placid. Had it not been for him or for Mike, we wouldn’t be talking about it now".

== Films ==
Film	U.S. release date	Director(s)	Screenwriter(s)	Story by	Producer(s)
Lake Placid	July 16, 1999	Steve Miner	David E. Kelley	David E. Kelley	David E. Kelley & Michael Pressman
Lake Placid 2	April 28, 2007	David Flores	Todd Hurvitz & Howie Miller	Todd Hurvitz & Howie Miller	Jeffery Beach & Phillip Roth
Lake Placid 3	August 21, 2010	Griff Furst	David Reed	David Reed	Jeffery Beach & Phillip Roth
Lake Placid: The Final Chapter	September 29, 2012	Don Michael Paul	David Reed	David Reed	Jeffery Beach & Phillip Roth
Lake Placid vs. Anaconda	April 25, 2015	A. B. Stone	Berkeley Anderson	Berkeley Anderson	Jeffery Beach & Phillip Roth
Lake Placid: Legacy	May 28, 2018	Darrell Roodt	Jonathan Lloyd Walker	Jonathan Lloyd Walker, Matt Venables & Jeremy Smith	Lance Samuels

=== Lake Placid (1999) ===
A massive, man-eating crocodile terrorizes the small town of Black Lake in Maine. A group of people, including a paleontologist, a local sheriff, and a wildlife expert, are forced to work together to track down and stop the creature. As they uncover the mystery of the crocodile’s origins, they must confront the deadly predator and its reclusive owner, Delores Bickerman, before it claims more victims.

=== Lake Placid 2 (2007) ===
In Lake Placid 2, the offspring of the previous deadly crocodiles wreak havoc on Black Lake. The crocodiles, now owned by Sadie Bickerman, terrorize a new group generation, including a game warden, his family, and a group of teenagers.

Movie collection of the latter four entries in the series.

=== Lake Placid 3 (2010) ===
A game warden moves his family to Black Lake after inheriting the cabin of his aunt, Sadie Bickerman. Locals assure him the crocodiles are gone, but his mischievous young son finds a few juvenile crocs and begins feeding them. They quickly grow into very big adults and start attacking the game warden's family, nearby town, and poacher Reba.

=== Lake Placid: The Final Chapter (2012) ===
Reba the poacher is back, now an EPA agent. Black Lake is turned into a crocodile sanctuary surrounded by an electric fence. When the fence gets left open one night, a high-school field trip bus unknowingly enters the park. It's up to Reba and the sheriff to save the kids from becoming crocodile chow.

=== Lake Placid vs. Anaconda (2015) ===
The pharmaceutical company Wexel Hall inadvertently causes a new generation of mutant anacondas to escape into the crocodile-infested Black Lake. As the deadly snakes wreak havoc on the town, Sheriff Reba and her team must face off against the killer reptiles. With both creatures threatening the town's survival, the characters must find a way to stop the carnage and prevent further destruction.

=== Lake Placid: Legacy (2018) ===
A group of young explorers and activists discover a secret area hidden from all maps and GPS devices. When they reach the center of the lake, they discover the abandoned facility where the crocodiles of Black Lake originated from. However, the beast that lurks in the facility is larger and deadlier than any that came before it.

== Cast and crew ==
=== Cast ===
Key
- An ^{A} indicates an appearance through archival footage.
- A ^{P} indicates an appearance in onscreen photographs.
- A ^{U} indicates an uncredited role.
- A dark gray cell indicates the character was not in the film.

Characters	Films					
Characters	Lake Placid	Lake Placid 2	Lake Placid 3	Lake Placid: The Final Chapter	Lake Placid vs. Anaconda	Lake Placid: Legacy
Characters	1999	2007	2010	2012	2015	2018
Jack Wells	Bill Pullman					
Kelly Scott	Bridget Fonda					
Hector Cyr	Oliver Platt					
Sheriff Hank Keough	Brendan Gleeson					
Deputy Sharon Gare	Meredith Salenger					
Walt Lawson	David Lewis					
Stephen Daniels	Tim Dixon					
Myra Okubo	Mariska Hargitay					
Sheriff James Riley		John Schneider				
Emily "Emma" Warner		Sarah Lafleur				
Jack Struthers		Sam McMurray				
Scott Riley		Chad Michael Collins	Chad Michael Collins^{A}			
Kerri		Alicia Ziegler	Alicia Ziegler^{A}			
Ahmad Andrews		Joe Holt				
Thad Hyland		Ian Reed Kesler				
Larry Willis		Justin Urich				
Reba			Yancy Butler	Yancy Butler	Yancy Butler	
Ellie			Kacey Clarke			
Brett Willies			Mark Evans			
Aaron Fitzgerald			Nils Hognestad			
Tara Kendrick			Angelica Penn			
Charlie Berman			Brian Landon			
Sheriff Tony Willinger			Michael Ironside			
Sheriff Theresa Giove				Elisabeth Röhm		
Ryan Loflin				Paul Nicholls		
Chloe Giove				Poppy Lee Friar		
Max Loflin				Benedict Smith		
Elaine Ford				Caroline Ford		
Brittany Fanning				Scarlett Byrne		
Drew				Daniel Black		
Deputy Nermal				Jeff Stewart		
Will "Tully" Tull					Corin Nemec	
Bethany Tull					Skye Lourie	
Sarah Murdoch					Annabel Wright	
Beach					Stephen Billington^{U}	
Tiffani Jones					Laura Dale	
Margo					Ali Eagle	
Jane					Heather Gilbert	
Jennifer					Georgina Philipps	
Melissa					Jenny May Darcy	
Deputy Ferguson					Oliver Walker	
Jade						Katherine Barrell
Sam						Tim Rozon
Alice						Sai Bennett
Billy						Luke Newton
Spencer						Craig Stein
Henderson						Joe Pantoliano
The Bickermans
Delores Bickerman	Betty White	Betty White^{P}		Mentioned		
Bernie Bickerman	Mentioned					
Sadie Bickerman		Cloris Leachman	Cloris Leachman^{A}	Mentioned		
Nathan Bickerman			Colin Ferguson	Mentioned		
Susan Bickerman			Kirsty Mitchell			
Connor Bickerman			Jordan Grehs			
Jim Bickerman				Robert Englund	Robert Englund	

=== Crew ===
Role	Film					
Role	Lake Placid	Lake Placid 2	Lake Placid 3	Lake Placid: The Final Chapter	Lake Placid vs. Anaconda	Lake Placid: Legacy
Role	1999	2007	2010	2012	2015	2018
Composer	John Ottman	Nathan Furst	Nathan Furst	Frederik Wiedmann	Claude Foisy	James Matthes Andries Smit
Editor	Paul Hirsch Marshall Harvey	John Quinn	Matt Michael	John Quinn	Cameron Hallenbeck	Christopher Minns
Cinematographer	Daryn Okada	Lorenzo Senatore	Anton Bakarski	Martin Chichov	Ivo Peitchev	Trevor Calverley
Production companies	Fox 2000 Pictures Phoenix Pictures Rocking Chair Productions	20th Century Fox Home Entertainment Sony Pictures Home Entertainment Sci-Fi Pictures	Stage 6 Films UFO International	UFO International	Destination Films UFO International	Destination Films Blue Ice Pictures Out of Africa Entertainment
Distributor	20th Century Fox	Sci Fi	Syfy	Syfy	Syfy	Syfy
Running time	82 minutes	88 minutes	96 minutes	90 minutes	92 minutes	93 minutes

== Reception ==
Film	Rotten Tomatoes	Metacritic	CinemaScore
Lake Placid	47% (96 reviews)	34 (25 reviews)	C
Lake Placid 2	11% (9 reviews)	—N/a	—N/a
Lake Placid 3	—N/a	—N/a	—N/a
Lake Placid: The Final Chapter	—N/a	—N/a	—N/a
Lake Placid vs. Anaconda	—N/a	—N/a	—N/a
Lake Placid: Legacy	—N/a	—N/a	—N/a

== Music ==
Title	U.S. release date	Length	Composed by	Label
Lake Placid: Original Motion Picture Soundtrack	July 27, 1999	47:00	John Ottman	Varèse Sarabande
Lake Placid 2: Original Motion Picture Soundtrack	August 12, 2008	24:00	Nathan Furst	Lakeshore Records

== Video games ==
Lake Placid: Croc Drop is an interactive game produced in 1999 to promote the film Lake Placid from the same year.

Lake Placid 2: Croc Alley is an interactive game produced in 2007 to promote the film Lake Placid 2 from the same year.
