= List of eco-horror films =

This is a list of eco-horror films.

== Criteria ==
These are some natural horror films and other films in the horror genre whose plots include mention of ecological issues. Also included are documentaries dealing with the possible disastrous ecological consequences of human activity. It is also known as "eco-terror".

== Documentaries ==
- The Hellstrom Chronicle (1971)
- An Inconvenient Truth (2006; global warming)
- The 11th Hour (2007; the state of the natural environment)
- Gasland (2010)

== Fictional ==
- King Kong (1933)
- The Beast from 20,000 Fathoms (1953)
- Creature from the Black Lagoon (1954)
- Godzilla (1954)
- Them! (1954; about atomically mutated ants)
- It Came from Beneath the Sea (1955)
- Tarantula (1955)
- Attack of the Crab Monsters (1957)
- Beginning of the End (1957)
- Amanita Pestilens (1963)
- The Birds (1963)
- Planet of the Apes (1968)
- Willard (1971)
- Deliverance (1972)
- Frogs (1972)
- Night of the Lepus (1972; about giant killer rabbits)
- Silent Running (1972)
- Godmonster of Indian Flats (1973; about mutated sheep in Virginia City)
- The Wicker Man (1973)
- Phase IV (1974)
- Jaws (1975)
- Grizzly (1976)
- Squirm (1976)
- Day of the Animals (1977)
- Kingdom of the Spiders (1977)
- Jennifer (1978)
- Attack of the Killer Tomatoes (1978)
- Long Weekend (1978; animals turn hostile towards a young couple who disrespect nature)
- Piranha (1978)
- The Swarm (1978; about killer bees)
- The China Syndrome (1979)
- Prophecy (1979)
- Alligator (1980)
- C.H.U.D. (1984)
- Razorback (1984)
- The Toxic Avenger (1984)
- The Quiet Earth (1985)
- The Stuff (1985)
- Troll 2 (1990)
- Arachnophobia (1990)
- Cronos (1993)
- Jurassic Park (1993; about cloning dinosaurs)
- Safe (1995; about suburban pollution)
- Waterworld (1995)
- Mimic (1997)
- The Day After Tomorrow (2004)
- The Last Winter (2006; oil drilling in Alaska awakes slumbering forces)
- The Happening (2008; plants release a toxin as a defense mechanism)
- Take Shelter (2011)
- The Bay (2012; about the Chesapeake Bay water quality problems)
- Snowpiercer (2013)
- Harbinger (2016; about the poisonous effects of fracking)
- Sleep Has Her House (2017)
- Unearth (2020; about the consequences of fracking)
- In the Earth (2021)
- Humane (2024; about the consequences of ecological collapse)
- The Caretakers (2025)
- The Last House (2026)

== See also ==
- List of disaster films
- List of films featuring giant monsters
- List of natural horror films
- List of environmental films
- RiffTrax
  - Mystery Science Theater 3000
