= Elena Boeva =

Bulgarian model and actress based in New York, USA

- Born: Sofia, Bulgaria
- Education: University of National and World Economy; New York Film Academy
- Occupations: Model, Actress
- Years active: 2009 - 2013
- Height: 5 ft 7 in (1.70 m)

Elena Boeva is a Bulgarian model and actress based in New York, USA. Boeva came to India to participate in the dance reality show Nach Baliye 5 on Star Plus as the partner of Kushal Tandon. She has been participating in many international projects, such as TV commercials, movies, TV and reality shows in USA, Bulgaria, India and Turkey.

== Television shows ==
Year	Name of Show	Character
2012-13	Nach Baliye 5	as herself

== Movies ==
- 2012 Lake Placid: The Final Chapter as Tina
- 2013 Taken: The Search for Sophie Parker as U.S. Envoy
