= Mitch Teemley =

American writer and filmmaker

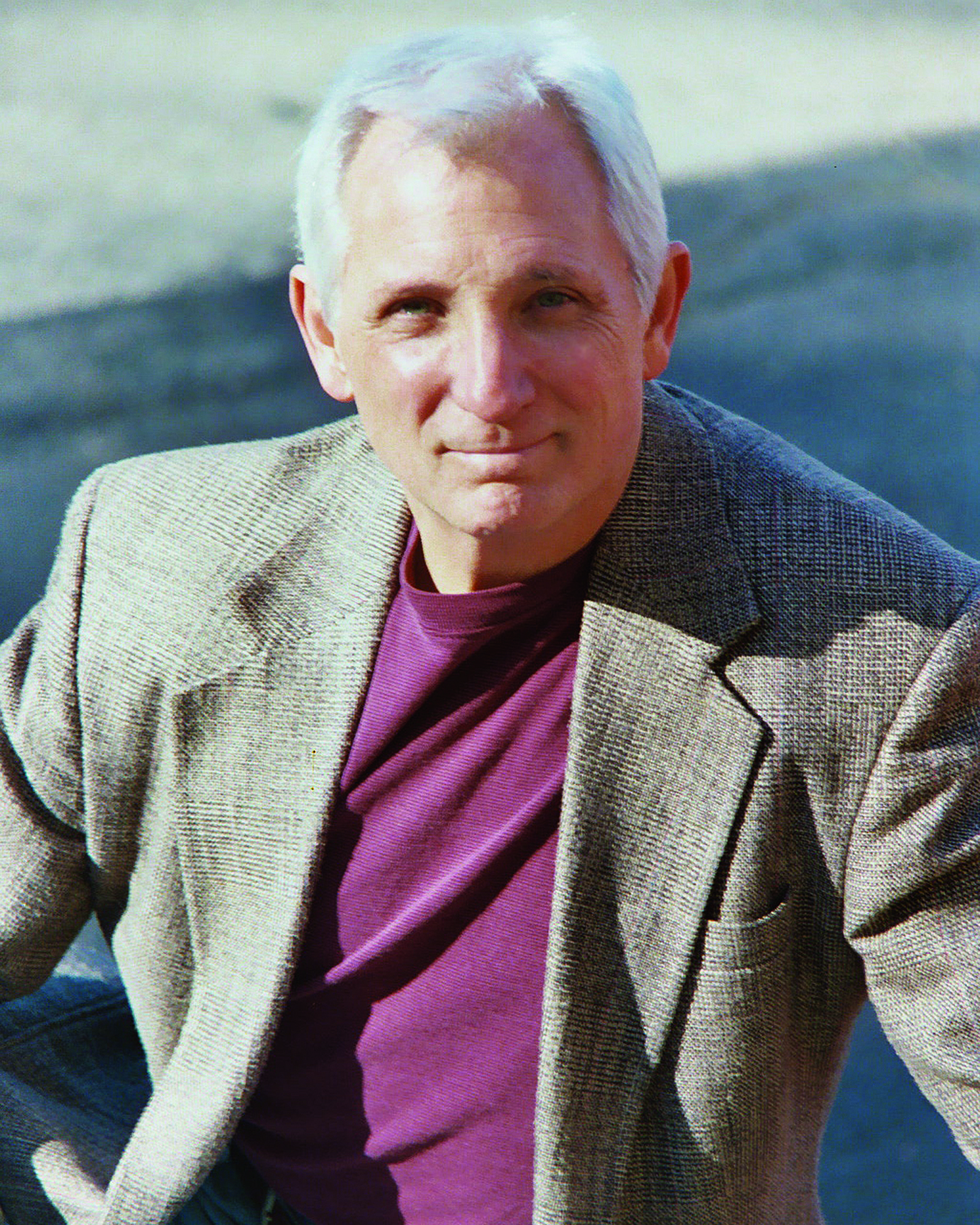
- Born: Mitchell Russell Teemley; May 12, 1950 (age 75); Whittier, California
- Occupation(s): Writer, director, producer, actor, composer
- Years active: 1973–present
- Notable work: Healing River, Notzilla
- Website: https://mitchteemley.com/

Mitch Teemley (born May 12, 1950) is an American writer, director, producer, actor and composer best known for his work on the feature films Healing River (2020) and Notzilla (2020).

== Early life ==
"A multi-hyphenate (writer, preacher, teacher, director, composer)," Teemley was born in Whittier, California, and raised in the Los Angeles suburbs of Downey and La Mirada. While still in high school, "he performed with his band on an ABC television special hosted by Aretha Franklin" and Ed Ames titled The Sounds of '68.

== Career ==
=== 1970s–1980s ===
In 1973, Teemley hosted and co-wrote Walt Disney Studios' 50th Anniversary Celebration. Following the completion of his MFA in Directing at the University of California, Irvine, "he taught acting in England alongside Ben Kingsley and Patrick Stewart", and "after returning to the U.S., became a member of the sketch comedy groups Isaac Air Freight, Mitch & Allen, and the National Lampoon Players, writing and performing on numerous comedy albums and videos."

=== 1990s – early 2000s ===
Following post-graduate studies at AFI and UCLA, "Teemley moved into filmmaking, developing the story for and producing his first feature Out of Time for Showtime/Columbia Pictures in 2000." During the film industry downturn in 2005, he moved with his family to Cincinnati, Ohio, where he oversaw worship at College Hill Presbyterian Church.

=== 2000s to present ===
Recently, he wrote, directed, and produced the feature film Healing River "(which) has been nominated for fourteen film festival awards, winning four to date," and is "one of the highest rated independent faith-based films on Amazon Prime." He (also) recently released his second feature as writer-director-producer—the award-winning comedy-spoof Notzilla." Upon its release, MovieWeb's Kevin Burwick predicted, "Looks like it could be a cult classic." Along with writing, directing and producing, he has continued to act, playing the lead role in the feature film Promises to Keep (2020). In addition, "he has taught preaching/public speaking and media arts for nearly 20 years."

== Personal life ==
“(Teemley) has two young adult daughters and lives with his wife of 35 years, Trudy, in Cincinnati, Ohio."
