= Wolvesbayne =

- DVD cover
- Genre: Fantasy; Horror
- Written by: Leigh Scott
- Directed by: Griff Furst
- Starring: Jeremy London; Christy Carlson Romano; Mark Dacascos; Yancy Butler; Rhett Giles
- Theme music composer: Miles Hankins
- Country of origin: United States
- Original language: English

Production
- Producer: Leigh Scott
- Cinematography: Bill Posley
- Editor: Griff Furst
- Running time: 92 minutes
- Production company: Bullet Films

Original release
- Network: Syfy
- Release: October 18, 2009

Wolvesbayne is a horror film, directed by Griff Furst and starring Jeremy London as a newly-mutated werewolf working with vampire hunters to stop a vampire cult with plans to resurrect Lilith, the mother of all vampires. It co-stars Yancy Butler, Christy Carlson Romano, and Marc Dacascos. Wolvesbayne premiered on Syfy's 31 Nights of Halloween in 2009.

== Plot ==
Following an attack, ruthless businessman Russell Bayne shapeshifts into a werewolf and seeks help from Alex Layton, an occult shop owner. Together, they learn that vampires under the leadership of Von Griem seek to resurrect their queen, Lilith, in order to unite the warring factions. Bayne allies with a vampire hunter, Jacob Van Helsing, and they battle Lilith and her vampire servants.

== Cast ==
- Jeremy London as Russell Bayne
- Christy Carlson Romano as Alex Layton
- Mark Dacascos as Von Griem
- Yancy Butler as Lilith
- Rhett Giles as Jacob Van Helsing
- Stephanie Honoré as Zafira
- Billy Slaughter as Felix

== Production ==
Ex-members of The Asylum produced the film under the banner of Bullet Films. It was announced and began production in 2008.

== Release ==
Wolvesbayne was first broadcast on Syfy on October 18, 2009, and it was released on video January 4, 2011.

== Reception ==
Scott Foy of Dread Central rated it 2.5/5 stars and wrote the film is "not half bad" but lacks focus on the promised werewolf action.
