= The Holding (film) =

- Directed by: Susan Jacobson
- Screenplay by: James Dormer
- Produced by: Alex Boden; George Mizen; Terry Stone
- Music by: James Edward Barker; Natalie Ann Holt
- Release dates: 26 August 2011 (Film4 FrightFest); 9 September 2011 (United Kingdom)
- Running time: 89 minutes
- Country: United Kingdom
- Language: English

The Holding is a 2011 British thriller film directed by Susan Jacobson. It was filmed in 2010 the Peak District in Derbyshire just outside the village of Longnor, and stars Kierston Wareing, Vincent Regan and David Bradley. It is written by James Dormer and is produced by Alex Boden, George Mizen and Terry Stone.

== Plot ==
The film opens on the dead body of Dean (Christopher Brand) being dragged into a shallow grave in the dead of night by his wife, Cassie Naylor (Keirston Wareing) and the old farm hand Cooper (David Bradley). As they carry out a rudimentary and hurried burial, all the while, they are unknowingly being watched by Cassie's eight-year-old daughter, Amy (Maisie Lloyd).

The story then jumps to eight months later. Cassie is struggling; her relationship with her two daughters, Amy and Hannah (Skye Lourie) is fractious. She is struggling to run her farm and her financial situation is so bad that she can no longer afford to pay Cooper. She is visited by a sinister neighboring farmer, Karsten (Terry Stone), who is eager to buy Cassie's farm and marry her, both of which Cassie declines.

Enter Aden (Vincent Regan), an old friend of Dean's who was passing. Quick to cover up her secret, Cassie tells Aden that Dean left. Aden asks if he can stay the night, and after some convincing from Amy, Cassie reluctantly concedes. The next day, Aden persuades Cassie that he can be of use to her on the farm and Cassie allows him to stay on, much to the displeasure of Cassie's 16-year-old daughter Hannah who immediately dislikes Aden, sussing out his intentions of getting "into my mum's knickers".

Karsten's interest in Cassie escalates as his jealousy of Aden mounts. He throws around irrational threats, gloatingly kills one of Cassie's calves and builds a roadblock denying Cassie access to the outside world. This is the last straw and Aden tells Cassie that he will "talk to Karsten". But instead, Aden kills Karsten and his brother, Noah (Jake Curran), in cold blood.

Life on Cassie's farm settles down as she believes that Aden had a strong word with Karsten and she quickly falls for him. Aden helps Cassie out with her finances, making a good deal on cattle feed and suggesting that she get rid of Cooper as he is costing too much. It's after the firing of Cooper that Hannah confronts Aden, knowing that what he really wants is to control the family. Aden enjoys her teenage bravado, and quickly retorts with his knowledge of Hannah's deepest secret: Dean's abuse of her. Stunned and hurt, Hannah flees the farm.

What follows is Aden's irrational hunting of his "daughter", much to Cassie's shock. When he returns to the farm without Hannah, Aden strikes Cassie, exposing his true deranged nature in front of Cassie, who walks him off her property at gunpoint while making it clear that if he ever comes back, she will kill him. She tracks down Hannah, and for the first time in a long time, mother and daughter connect, and Hannah promises to return in the morning. That night, Cassie finds Dean's wedding ring amongst Aden's things. Spooked, she traipses back to Dean's unmarked grave with shovel in hand and digs up the grave, only to find it empty. She contacts Cooper, stating that "there's no body".

The next morning, Cooper and Cassie find her prized bull dead, throat slit. This is the last straw for Cassie and she marches up to Karsten's place, determined to sell her holding to him, but what she finds is the rotting, fly-ridden bodies of Karsten and Noah, and Aden living in the house. Cassie tries to escape with Amy, but Aden knocks her out and takes her and Amy back to the farm.

As Cassie comes round, Aden confesses all: Dean was not dead, but escaped from the grave and fled back to the oil rigs - the only other place he knew. There, he told Aden everything; the abuse of Hannah and his "murder". Aden tells Cassie of his disdain of the man who "had everything and pissed it away". Realizing that she is now in the hands of a psychopath, Cassie tries to talk Aden round, but all he wants is for them to be a family. The moment Hannah returns home, Aden locks Cassie and her daughters in Hannah's room. It is here where the truth comes out, and for the first time, mother and daughter talk about Dean's abuse. Cassie confesses that she tried to kill Dean when she found out about him abusing Hannah, but he escaped and went back to the rigs. Amy admits to seeing her mother bury her father's body. Now with all the secrets out in the open, the three of them bond and unite.

What follows is Aden's attempt at playing "happy families", and the girls attempt at ridding themselves of Aden. Together, they manage to lure him to the slurry pit. Little Amy surprises Aden and pushes him into the cavernous pit of cow excrement. In the final moments, Cassie spots Aden's lighter in the mud, lights it, and lets it fall into the methane-filled cavity with Aden still in it. Aden screams in horror as the lighter falls into the pit, causing it and the surrounding methane to erupt in a massive explosion, killing Aden while leaving Cassie, Hannah and Amy clinging to each other, unharmed, and as a family.

== Cast ==
- Aden - Vincent Regan
- Cassie - Kierston Wareing
- Cooper - David Bradley
- Hannah - Skye Lourie
- Amy - Maisie Lloyd
- Karsten - Terry Stone
- Jed - Jarrod Cooke
- Noah - Jake Curran
- Mick - Mark Cooper-Harris
- Gemma - Georgia Groome
- Dean - Christopher Brand
- Frazer - Gregory Oliver
- Store Owner - Eileen Davies
- Vet - David Hobbs
