= Skye Lourie =

New Zealand-British actress

- Born: Skye Josephine Marshall Lourie; 15 December 1990 (age 35); New Zealand
- Occupation: Actress
- Years active: 2010–present
- Spouse: Joe Drake (m. 2022)

Skye Josephine Marshall Lourie (born 15 December 1990) is a New Zealand-British actress and playwright. She is known for her role as Elizabeth of Weymouth in the miniseries The Pillars of the Earth (2010). Her films include The Holding (2011) and Farming (2018).

== Early life ==
Lourie was born in New Zealand, and grew up in Tuscany and Perthshire near the coast. She attended Tring Park School for the Performing Arts in Hertfordshire and Hurtwood House in Surrey.

== Career ==
Lourie was 18 when she was cast in her debut television role as Elizabeth of Weymouth in the miniseries adaptation of Ken Follett's The Pillars of the Earth, which aired in 2010. This was followed in 2011 by her feature film debut in The Holding. She also appeared in Guinea Pigs. She guest starred in an episode of the series Hustle (2012). In 2011, she featured in the music video "Time", written by drum-and-bass duo Chase & Status' for their second studio album, No More Idols.

In 2015, Lourie played Bethany Tull in the Syfy television film Lake Placid vs. Anaconda. She wrote and starred in a play titled Elsie Thatchwick, which ran at the Edinburgh Fringe Fringe Festival as well as the Latchmere in London. Lourie worked with director Jamie Patterson on the films Star Dogs (2020) and God's Petting You (2022).

== Personal life ==
Lourie married Joe Drake in July 2022 in Tuscany. She co-founded a London-based catering company with fellow actress Grace Carter.

== Filmography ==
=== Film ===
Year	Title	Role	Notes
2011	The Holding	Hannah	
2012	The Facility	Carmen	
2017	The Marker	Jess	
2017	Starvecrow	Skye	
2018	Farming	Paula	
2018	Tracks	Mia	
2022	God's Petting You	Tattoo Girl	
TBA	Kinked		Anthology

=== Television ===
Year	Title	Role	Notes
2010	The Pillars of the Earth	Elizabeth of Weymouth	8 episodes
2012	Hustle	Kat Farmer	Episode: "Curiosity Caught the Kat"
2015	Uncle	Belle	1 episode
2015	Lake Placid vs. Anaconda	Bethany Tull	Television film
2015	No Offence	Jogger	1 episode
2018	Hard Sun	Rebecca Leaver	Episode: "Can You Hear Him Now?"
2020	Star Dogs	Arana	Television film
2021	The Nevers	Katie	Pilot

=== Music videos ===
Song	Year	Artist	Notes
"Time"	2011	Chase & Status	
"Ashes"	2018	St. Blue	

== Stage ==
Year	Title	Role	Notes
2012	Donny's Brain	Flea	Hampstead Theatre, London
2013	Nothing is the End of the World	Jessica Shaw	Finborough Theatre, London
2014	Everyday Maps for Personal Use	Maggie	Finborough Theatre, London
2018	Elsie Thatchwick	Elsie	Playwright; Edinburgh Fringe Festival / The Latchmere, London
