= Sai Bennett =

English actress and model

- Born: Sai Naomi Bennett; 30 May 1990 (age 36); Aldershot, England
- Occupations: Actress; model
- Years active: 2003–present
- Children: 1

Sai Naomi Bennett (born 30 May 1990) is an English actress and model. She began her career in modeling and gained prominence through her roles in the film The Face of an Angel (2014) and the ITV period drama Mr Selfridge (2014–2015). She has since appeared in the Starz series The Spanish Princess (2020).

== Early life and education ==
Bennett was born in Aldershot, Hampshire and grew up in Hackney, East London with her older sister and younger brother. She is of Welsh descent. Bennett attended the now defunct Royal School, Hampstead and left at sixteen after completing her GCSEs. She traveled and worked odd jobs before her former school drama teacher suggested she try acting. She began taking weekend acting classes and signed with an agent. Her brother also took part in local theatre.

== Career ==
Bennett was 13 when she booked her first modeling job for Japanese Vogue. She signed with Storm Models. She featured in Cosmopolitan's 2011 Sexy Eyes photoshoot. She also had gigs with Urban Outfitters, Hollister Co., and Daisy London.

In 2012, Bennett made both her film and television debuts in Trapped as Emily and the first series of the BBC One drama Prisoners' Wives as Saskia. In 2014, she joined the cast of ITV period drama Mr Selfridge for its second and third series as the seamstress Jessie Pertree and played Elizabeth Pryce in Michael Winterbottom's psychological thriller The Face of an Angel. This was followed by roles in the 2015 film Just Jim and the 2016 BBC Two 1940s-set miniseries Close to the Enemy.

Bennett starred in the 2018 Syfy television film sequels Lake Placid: Legacy directed by Darrell Roodt and Leprechaun Returns. She appeared in Greta Bellamacina's Hurt by Paradise in 2019. That same year, it was announced Bennett would star as Mary Tudor, later Queen of France, in the latter half of the Starz historical miniseries The Spanish Princess, which aired in 2020. She appeared in the 2022 BBC Three musical drama Mood.

== Personal life ==
Bennett is engaged to chef and restaurateur Matthew Scott. Their first child, a daughter named Edith Scott-Bennett, was born on 26 February 2022 at Homerton University Hospital.

== Filmography ==
=== Film ===
Year	Title	Role	Notes
2012	Trapped	Emily	
2014	The Face of an Angel	Elizabeth Pryce	
2015	Just Jim	Michelle	
2016	Edith	Edith	Short film
2016	First	Mary	Short film
2019	Hurt by Paradise	Sophie	
2026	The Dog Stars	Melissa	

=== Television ===
Year	Title	Role	Notes
2012	Prisoners' Wives	Saskia	3 episodes
2014–2015	Mr Selfridge	Jessie Pertree	Recurring role (series 2–3)
2016	Close to the Enemy	Anna White	Miniseries; 6 episodes
2017	Knightfall	Marie	Episode: "You'd Know What to Do"
2018	Strike Back: Retribution	Lila Hall	1 episode
2018	Lake Placid: Legacy	Alice	Television film
2018	Leprechaun Returns	Rose	Television film
2020	The Spanish Princess	Mary Tudor, Queen of France	Main role (part 2)
2022	Mood	Esmeralda	Miniseries; 2 episodes
2025	El Turco	Diana	5 episodes

=== Music videos ===
Song	Year	Artist	Notes
"Sorry's Not Good Enough"	2006	McFly	
