= Lake Placid: The Final Chapter =

2012 film by Don Michael Paul

- DVD cover
- Written by: David Reed
- Directed by: Don Michael Paul
- Starring: Elisabeth Röhm; Yancy Butler; Paul Nicholls; Benedict Smith; Poppy Lee Friar; Caroline Ford; Robert Englund
- Music by: Frederik Wiedmann
- Country of origin: United States
- Original language: English

Production
- Producers: Jeffery Beach; Phillip Roth
- Cinematography: Martin Chichov
- Editor: John Quinn
- Running time: 90 minutes
- Production company: UFO International

Original release
- Network: Syfy
- Release: September 29, 2012

Related
- Lake Placid 3 (2010); Lake Placid vs. Anaconda (2015)

Lake Placid: The Final Chapter (also known as Lake Placid 4 or Lake Placid 4: The Final Chapter) is a 2012 American made-for-television comedy horror film directed by Don Michael Paul. It is a sequel to Lake Placid 3 (2010) and the fourth installment in the Lake Placid film series. The film stars Elisabeth Röhm, Yancy Butler, Paul Nicholls and Robert Englund. It tells the story of killer crocodiles who terrorize the local community.

The film premiered on September 29, 2012, by Syfy and was released on DVD on February 19, 2013. As the title suggests, it was originally intended to be the final installment in the series, but was followed by a crossover sequel with the Anaconda film series, Lake Placid vs. Anaconda was released in 2015.

== Plot ==
Reba is revealed to still be alive. (Note: This takes place shortly after the events of the third film.) She kills the last remaining crocodile in the supermarket.

Two years later, Reba now an EPA agent, returns to Black Lake with Dennis and sheriff Theresa Giove to neutralize a crocodile hatchling with a tranquilizer. They meet lieutenant Ryan Loffin on land and drive towards a ten-thousand volt fence built by the Army Corps of Engineers. Dennis and poacher Jimmy Bickerman sneak into the lake to steal crocodile eggs, but are attacked by crocodiles. Max, Ryan's son, is also attacked and dragged away by a crocodile.

Theresa's daughter Chloe and her friend Elaine join the Marshfield Swim Team in a tour bus, which mistakenly goes through the gate (which Max had left open) of the electric-fenced park towards the Black Lake instead of Clear Lake, and the swim team spends the night there. Gus, the bus driver, uses the lake as a bathroom, spying on two girls playing in the water, and is killed by a crocodile after the girls leave the water. The next morning, with the police officials on alert, Ryan, Teresa, and Reba search the lake for the students, the swim team decides to ride the lake with jet skis, and one of them, Joey, falls off into the water. There, he is killed by crocodile hatchlings. A student on the beach is dragged by a crocodile into the water, and another is slain while trying to enter the bus. The other students and the coach reach the bus before further attacks. Chloe, who has wandered off in the woods, meets Max, who survived, after he fell off a resting platform on top of a tree.

The team finds a skeletal part of a crocodile from a crocodile carcass. The swim team continues to run through the woods until they find an abandoned camp and a smaller crocodile. The group flees separately, and Brittany steps into a trap on a rope, and gets strung up on the tree. The crocodile decapitates her. Chloe falls into a hole, is trapped, and battles with another crocodile. Max distracts the crocodile with a rock, and Chloe subdues it by hitting it with an unloaded gun. The team finds the injured Dennis while Chloe retrieves a cell phone from the crocodile's mouth, which she uses to call her mother. Max dispatches a rope to pull Chloe out of the hole as the crocodile awakens.

The team makes it to land, but Dennis is pulled under the bus and killed by a crocodile. The remaining swim team and Max encounter Jimmy, who "forcefully" encourages the kids to board his boat. Coach Macklin refuses to go into the water and is killed by a crocodile. The students and Max are taken hostage by Jimmy. They make it back to land and are taken to Sadie Bickerman's abandoned cabin, where he has them stay in. Jimmy then finds a nest of eggs by the shoreline.

The team finds Tina, one of the students, by the electric fence while Jimmy steals the eggs from the nest and stows them away in his satchel. Elaine finds one room of the cabin full of flesh and blood and is attacked by the crocodile in it. Chloe and others kill the crocodile while Elaine still survives with injuries. They reunite with the team while Reba accuses Jimmy of his actions. Jimmy takes Max hostage to stop the others from interfering and to make him lead the way out while a crocodile breaks free from its chains and takes a boat with it. Drew is devoured as he tries swimming towards the boat while Max yells for him; Ryan uses the distraction to knock out Jimmy. The others retreat towards the fence. Theresa dodges a charging crocodile, causing it to crash into the fence and become electrocuted to death.

By next morning, Jimmy awakens and, after discovering that the eggs are all crushed, taunts the last crocodile. He tosses his satchel and appears to be devoured as the crocodile latches on to his leg. An ambulance arrives to support the survivors by the electric fence. Theresa and Ryan kiss. A woman jogging through the woods later thinks the lake is now crocodile free, but is killed by the last crocodile that still remains.

== Cast ==
- Elisabeth Röhm as Sheriff Theresa Giove, Sheriff of Black Lake and Chloe's Mother
- Yancy Butler as EPA Agent Reba, Hunting Guide Turned EPA Agent
- Paul Nicholls as Lieutenant Ryan Loflin
- Poppy Lee Friar as Chloe Giove, Theresa's Daughter
- Benedict Smith as Max Loflin
- Caroline Ford as Elaine
- Scarlett Byrne as Brittany
- Daniel Black as Drew
- Jeff Stewart as Deputy I. Nermal
- Robert Englund as Jim Bickerman
- Ako Mitchell as Dennis
- Sewell Whitney as Coach Macklin
- Elena Boeva as Tina
- Peter Ladjev as Joey
- Kitodar Todorov as Gus
- Terry Randall as Sharkey
- Zara Dimitrova as Barbara
- Borisa Tutundjieva as Girl #1
- Marina Gerganova as Girl #2
- Jonas Talkington as The Coroner

== Reception ==
The film received generally negative reviews, mostly due to its uses of unrealistic, low-budget CGI (just like the two predecessors) and an open ending that is conflicting with its name.

However, Lake Placid: The Final Chapter has also been stated to be much better than both of its predecessors. It received positive reviews from some critics who praised its plot and character development. David E. Kelley, the writer of the original film, gave the film 4.5 out of 5 stars and said: "Is this the last one really? The ending doesn't make me think so. I am glad to see Robert Englund in this and some of the cast from the previous movie! The effects are still lame as second and third, but the story is good".

Another critic, Marcie Frank, said she was totally into it and couldn't change the channel. Scott Weinberg, from FEARnet, wrote: "I've seen a lot worse "crocs run wild" movies than Lake Placid 4. (Best praise I got. Sorry).

== Crossover ==
A crossover titled Lake Placid vs. Anaconda, was released in 2015.

== See also ==
- List of killer crocodile films
