= Lake Placid vs. Anaconda =

2015 film by A.B. Stone

- Official DVD cover
- Based on: Anaconda by; Hans Bauer; Jim Cash; Jack Epps Jr.; Lake Placid by David E. Kelley
- Written by: Berkeley Anderson
- Directed by: A.B. Stone
- Starring: Corin Nemec; Yancy Butler; Stephen Billington; Skye Lourie; Annabel Wright; Laura Dale; Ali Eagle; Robert Englund
- Music by: Claude Foisy
- Country of origin: United States
- Original language: English

Production
- Producers: Jeffery Beach; Phillip Roth
- Cinematography: Ivo Peitchev
- Editor: Cameron Hallenbeck
- Running time: 92 minutes
- Production companies: Destination Films; UFO International

Original release
- Network: Syfy
- Release: April 25, 2015

Related
- Lake Placid: The Final Chapter (2012); Anacondas: Trail of Blood (2009)

Lake Placid vs. Anaconda is a 2015 American comedy horror television film directed by A.B. Stone, written by Berkeley Anderson and starring Corin Nemec, Yancy Butler and Robert Englund. The film premiered on Syfy on April 25, 2015. It is a crossover between the Anaconda film series and the Lake Placid film series, serving as a sequel to Lake Placid: The Final Chapter (2012), and Anacondas: Trail of Blood (2009) and the fifth installment in both their respective series.

It was later followed by Lake Placid: Legacy (2018), and Anaconda (2024).

== Plot ==
Jim Bickerman, due to his injuries, is left with an eye patch, hook and wooden leg. (Note: He survived the attack in Lake Placid: The Final Chapter.) Working in Black Lake, Maine, with another mercenary named Beach, they capture a female giant crocodile. They take it back to their truck, where two scientists crossbreed its blood with a female giant anaconda to perfect a Blood Orchid serum. However, the crocodile escapes, killing a scientist, and freeing a female and two male anacondas before causing the truck to explode. The explosion destroys part of the electric fence keeping the crocodiles in Black Lake. Beach, Bickerman, and the one remaining scientist survive. A small group of crocodiles also escape.

The crocodiles search for food and one kills Daphne Mailer and her boyfriend, while another kills the remaining scientist, and multiple crocodile hatchlings kill a poacher. The crocodiles eventually make their way to nearby Clear Lake, along with the anacondas.

Reba, now the sheriff of Black Lake, calls U.S. Fish and Wildlife Service officer Will "Tully" Tull to help recapture the escaped crocodiles. Meanwhile, a group of Delta Gamma members and pledges including Tully's daughter, Bethany, along with Cassie, Heather, Jane, Jennifer, Margo, Megan, and Melissa, are led by sorority sisters Tiffani and Amber, and two fraternity boys from Sigma Phi, Brett and Andrew. They arrive at Clear Lake and begin initiation exercises.

The crocodiles soon begin to feast upon the sorority girls. Brett, Andrew, and Heather, who were wakeboarding, are eaten in the open water. Megan is dragged into the water by a croc while Amber is pushed by Tiffani towards a crocodile which proceeds to chow down on her. The survivors run into the forest wearing their bikinis to get to the cars. The girls left the keys on the beach, and the crocodiles attack the students. Cassie runs out of Jennifer's car, but a crocodile grabs her and drags her away. Tiffani's car is hotwired but is soon crushed by an anaconda with Jennifer still inside. A crocodile kills Tiffani after she punches it. Soon after, the survivors, Bethany, Jane, and Margo, are found by Reba and Tully.

Deputy Ferguson discovers one of the surviving sorority girls hiding on a boat. The traumatized girl, Melissa, is taken to a hospital, while Tully and Reba continue to search for Bethany. Clear Lake is evacuated by Ferguson.

Sarah Murdoch, the sociopathic daughter of the late Peter "J.D." Murdoch and CEO of Wexel Hall Corporation in New York, leads a team of herself, Beach, Bickerman, and two mercenaries and go to capture the female anaconda before it lays its eggs, hoping to finish her father's work. One of the mercenaries is attacked by a crocodile, and Beach is forced to shoot them both.

Tully and Reba are attacked by a crocodile, which is in turn attacked by an anaconda, which crushes the crocodile until it explodes. The anaconda then escapes. Sarah's group steals a boat, but Bickerman falls off and is dragged underwater by a crocodile. After landing, the other mercenary is killed by an anaconda. Tully and Reba kill the other anaconda and rescue Bethany, Margo, and Jane. They regroup along with Ferguson until Sarah and Beach arrive. They discover two crocodiles eating a male anaconda. The female anaconda appears and kills a crocodile, and a crocodile flings the male anaconda into a helicopter containing Sarah's extraction team, causing it to crash. The female anaconda kills the crocodile and eats Beach alive, who sacrifices his life by detonating a grenade and killing the anaconda that swallowed him, devastating Sarah's chances of completing her father's project. Sarah is arrested and Bickerman, who survived, emerges from the lake, laughing maniacally. One last crocodile appears, but Reba and Tully quickly kill it.

In the nest of eggs laid by the female anaconda, one egg hatches to reveal an anaconda hatchling with crocodile-like attributes.

== Cast ==
- Corin Nemec as Will "Tully" Tull
- Yancy Butler as Sheriff Reba, Sheriff of Black Lake
- Skye Lourie as Bethany Tull
- Robert Englund as Jim Bickerman
- Stephen Billington as Beach
- Annabel Wright as Sarah Murdoch
- Oliver Walker as Deputy Ferguson
- Laura Dale as Tiffani Jones
- Ali Eagle as Margo
- Georgina Philipps as Jennifer Bennett
- Natasha Jane Pyne as Daphne Mailer
- Heather Gilbert as Jane Goldsburg
- Jenny May Darcy as Melissa
- Nigel Barber as The Mayor
- Kalina Stomimenova as Megan
- Carolina Bratanova as Heather
- Sophia Lorenti as Amber Casino
- Vanessa Dimitrova as Cassie
- Deni Tsvetkova as Angela
- Luke Dinchev as Andrew
- Anton Poriazov as Brett
- David Roth as Earl
- Adara Stone as Margi
- Derek Morse as Bartender
- Velislav Pavlov as Scientist 1
- Nikolay Bakalov as Scientist 2
- Jason Small as Coroner
- Isaac Haig as Jason
- Natasha Jane Pyne as Daphne

== Production ==
Filming was scheduled to take place in Bulgaria in December 2013.

== Reception ==
Tim Brayton of "Alternate Ending" gave it 2 out of 5. Felix Vasquez of Cinema-crazed.com, despite low expectations, was not pleased by the film. He writes: "For the most part it succeeds in cheesy C grade "so bad it’s good" horror, with a lot of irritating characters getting their just deserts. I just wish there was more splatter to color the film along the way".

== Home media ==
Lake Placid vs. Anaconda was released on DVD and digital on August 4, 2015.

== Franchises ==
=== Sequel ===
Lake Placid: Legacy was released in 2018.

=== Remake ===
An indirect Chinese remake of Anaconda was released in 2024.

== See also ==
- List of killer crocodile films
- List of killer snake films
