= Yancy Butler =

American television and film actress

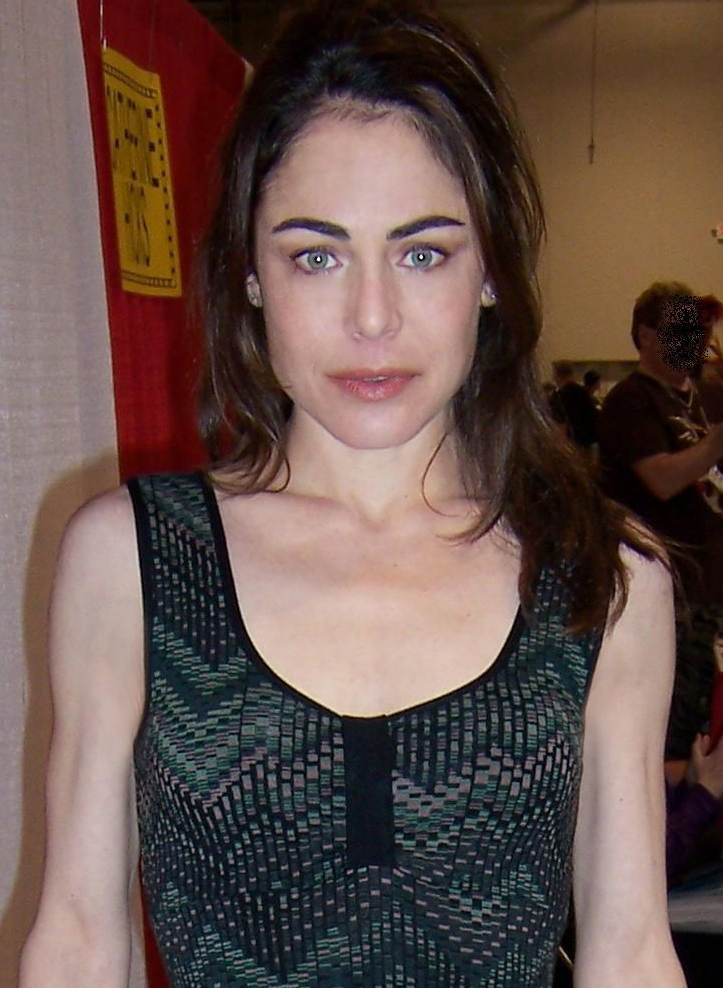
- Butler in May 2009
- Born: Yancy Victoria Butler; July 2, 1970 (age 56); New York City, New York, U.S.
- Education: Sarah Lawrence College
- Occupation: Actress
- Years active: 1979, 1991–present
- Father: Joe Butler

Yancy Victoria Butler (born July 2, 1970) is an American actress. She is known for her roles as Natasha Binder in the 1993 film Hard Target, Jess Crossman in Drop Zone (1994), and Detective Sara Pezzini on the TNT superhero television series Witchblade. For her performance in Witchblade, she won a Saturn Award for Best Actress in a Television Series.

== Early life ==
Yancy Victoria Butler was born in Greenwich Village in Manhattan, the daughter of Leslie Vega, a theatre company manager, and Joe Butler, the drummer and vocalist for the 1960s rock group the Lovin' Spoonful.

Butler attended Sarah Lawrence College, graduating in 1991.

== Career ==
Butler's first major role was in the television series Mann & Machine in 1992, in which she played an android police officer partnered with a human detective. The series was set in Los Angeles in the near future and was co-created by Dick Wolf. A year later, she starred in her second series, South Beach, in which she played a con artist and thief who works with the government to clear her criminal record.

Butler's first film appearance was a small supporting role in the 1979 slasher film Savage Weekend. Her next film appearance was a starring role in John Woo's 1993 film, Hard Target. She then starred in the 1994 film Drop Zone. In 1995, she starred as Corinne the dancer in the film Let It Be Me. Butler was cast as a series regular in the CBS television series Brooklyn South playing Anne-Marie Kersey, a Brooklyn policewoman, which ran for one season from 1997 to 1998.

Butler starred in the television film Witchblade (2000) and the subsequent television series, adapted from the ongoing comic book of the same title. The series ran for two seasons on the Turner Network Television network for a total of 23 episodes. Witchblade had a cult following, and was ranked seventh in the Top 10 Basic Cable Dramas for 2002. The show's cancellation was announced after the second season in September 2002.

In 2005, Butler starred in the film Bloodlines. For distribution purposes, it was retitled in 2006 as Striking Range. In 2007, she appeared in 13 episodes of the television soap opera As the World Turns, as Ava Jenkins. She was confirmed to appear in Tales of an Ancient Empire, the follow-up to The Sword and the Sorcerer. On January 24, 2012, Tales of an Ancient Empire was released on DVD. Butler, however, did not appear in the film. She appeared in a small role in another comic-book adaptation, the film version of Kick-Ass.

According to the Chicago Tribune, a fan site dedicated to Butler described her as having an "unmistakable husky voice and big, intense eyes". She told the newspaper: "That makes me sound like Peter Lorre."

== Legal issues ==
In November 2003, Butler was taken into custody in Delray Beach, Florida, for disorderly intoxication and sentenced to a substance-abuse treatment program. In 2007, she was charged with driving under the influence after she crashed her car.

On April 3, 2017, Butler was arrested in Sag Harbor, New York, and charged with aggravated drunken driving and possession of drugs after she was found passed out behind the wheel of her car after it had hopped a curb onto the sidewalk.

== Filmography ==
=== Film ===
Year	Title	Role	Notes
1979	Savage Weekend	Little Girl	
1993	Hard Target	Natasha Binder	
1993	The Hit List	Jordan Henning	
1994	Drop Zone	Jessie Crossman	
1995	Let It Be Me	Corinne	
1996	Fast Money	Francesca March	
1997	Ravager	Avedon Hammond	
1997	The Ex	Deidre Kenyon	
1997	Annie's Garden	Lisa Miller	
1998	The Treat	Wendy	
1999	The Witness Files	Sandy Dickinson	
2000	Doomsday Man	Captain Kate Roebuck	
2004	The Last Letter	Ms. Toney / Alicia Cromwell	
2006	Striking Range	Emily Johanson	
2008	Vote and Die: Liszt for President	Ann Barklely	
2010	Kick-Ass	Angie D'Amico	
2010	Lake Placid 3	Reba	
2012	Shark Week	Elena	
2012	Lake Placid: The Final Chapter	Reba	
2013	Hansel & Gretel Get Baked	Officer Hart	
2013	Kick-Ass 2	Angie D'Amico	
2015	Lake Placid vs. Anaconda	Reba	
2017	Death Race 2050	Alexis Hamilton	Direct to video
2017	Chasing the Star	Salome	
2018	The Assassin's Code	Laura Consolo	
2019	American Criminal	Dr. Penelope Lang	
2020	Emerald Run	Anna Thomas	
2021	Initiation	Detective Sandra Fitzgerald	
2021	Boogey-Man	Elena	
2021	The Accursed	Hana	
2021	Last Call in the Dog House	Mary	

=== Television ===
Year	Title	Role	Notes
1991	Law & Order	Beverly Kern	Episode: "Misconception"
1992	Grapevine	Karen	1 episode
1992	Mann & Machine	Sgt. Eve Edison	9 episodes
1993	South Beach	Kate Patrick	7 episodes
1997	NYPD Blue	Lucinda "Lucy" Hastings	1 episode
1997	Perversions of Science	Lisa Gerou	1 episode, "Given the Heir"
1997–1998	Brooklyn South	Officer Anne-Marie Kersey	21 episodes
2000	Witchblade	Detective Sara Pezzini	Television movie
2001–2002	Witchblade	Detective Sara Pezzini	23 episodes
2006	Double Cross	Kathy Swanson	Television movie
2006	Basilisk: The Serpent King	Hannah Carmelina Santorini Frankman	Television movie
2007	As the World Turns	Ava Jenkins	13 episodes
2008	Wolvesbayne	Lillith	Television movie
2010	Lake Placid 3	Reba	Television movie
2011	The Mentalist	Aunt Jodie	Episode: "Blood for Blood"
2011	Rage of the Yeti	Villers	Television movie
2012	Lake Placid: The Final Chapter	Reba	Television movie
2015	Lake Placid vs. Anaconda	Reba	Television movie
2017	Boyfriend Killer	Carrie Ellington	Television movie
2017	Witness Protection	Susan	Television movie
2021	Diary of a Lunatic	Clarissa	Television miniseries, 2 episodes

== Awards ==
On June 10, 2002, Butler won a Saturn Award for Best Actress in a Television Series, at the 29th Annual Academy of Science Fiction, Fantasy and Horror Films Awards ceremony, for her performances in Witchblade.
