= Monster (2008 film) =

- DVD cover
- Directed by: Eric Forsberg
- Written by: Eric Forsberg; David Michael Latt
- Produced by: David Michael Latt; David Rimawi; Paul Bales
- Starring: Yoshi Ando; Sarah Lieving; Shinichiro Shimizu; Erin Sullivan
- Distributed by: The Asylum
- Release date: January 15, 2008
- Running time: 90 minutes
- Countries: United States; Japan
- Languages: English; Japanese
- Budget: $500,000 (estimated)

Monster is a 2008 direct-to-video kaiju film. An international co-production of Japan and the United States, it is a mockbuster created to capitalize on the release of Cloverfield. It was released direct-to-DVD on January 15, 2008. Cloverfield was released theatrically three days later on January 18, 2008.

== Plot ==
The film takes place in Tokyo in 2003, where two reporters, Erin and Sarah Lynch, have arrived to document unusual seismic disturbances that have been picked up around Tokyo. The disturbances are originally thought to be aftershocks left over from a supposed massive earthquake on the Kanto Fault that occurred two years previously, causing hundreds of thousands of casualties and several hundred billion dollars in damage (possibly referencing the real-life Fukuoka earthquake or the Miyagi earthquake), although careful analysis of the evidence suggests otherwise.

As time goes on, all of Tokyo begins to suffer from abnormal earth tremors similar to those registered in 2005. The tremors are found not to be caused by an earthquake, but by a gigantic octopus that has been dormant for centuries. It has since been awakened by mankind and now sees Tokyo as a new feeding-ground; the filmmakers document the catastrophe as it unfolds.

It starts as Erin and Sarah are talking about filming Tokyo. The scene then switches to the interior of Erin's car as the two drive to LAX, to catch their flight to Tokyo. In Tokyo they rent a hotel room, and, the next day, Sarah films Erin talking with the global warming minister. During the interview, an earthquake strikes and the scene again switches to the reporters in the basement of the environmental building. They find a survivor named Justin Robbins, and as they flee, they hear the sounds of panic and plane engines from a tunnel.

Later, they find a mall, and another earthquake occurs. In the chaos, Justin is impaled by a pole as the reporters flee in panic. Some small text appears on the screen saying that tape #3 was damaged. As the reporters run toward a mall they find a woman (Aiko) and her grandfather, and they eat and sleep, Erin not realizing she had left the camera turned on. Then, another earthquake begins and kills the grandfather as the woman tells the reporters to flee. They hear the mall explode as they run away and soon find a building which they enter. They have gone upstairs when the building suddenly collapses. The reporters survive, but the collapse damages the camera lens.

Night arrives and they see helicopters ready to save refugees, but a tentacle destroys them and proceeds to throw cars at the people, killing many of them. Panic ensues, and Sarah abandons Erin. A tentacle slams into the ground where Erin is and she is wounded. Additionally, the camera's batteries run low. Sarah cries for Erin as the crash of a tentacle hitting the ground is heard, ending the film, which indicates that the reporters were crushed by the monster and were among the thousands, if not millions, killed.

== Reception ==
The few reviews of Monster that have been posted online are extremely negative. In an audio review, Scott Foy of Dread Central parodied the movie's found footage premise, pretending that the abysmal film was slowly driving him insane. The review ended with Foy supposedly jumping out a window. (He later said that some listeners believed he actually had gone mad.) Foy named Monster the "Worst Direct-to-DVD Horror Movie of 2008" in a later podcast. Other reviewers called the film's pacing "horrendous", and described the movie as "terrible" and "astoundingly dull".

== See also ==
- Cloverfield, another monster film released in the same year
- List of killer octopus films
