= Lake Placid: Legacy =

2018 film by Darrell Roodt

- Official DVD cover
- Based on: Lake Placid by David E. Kelley
- Screenplay by: Jonathan Lloyd Walker
- Story by: Jonathan Lloyd Walker; Matt Venables; Jeremy Smith
- Directed by: Darrell Roodt
- Starring: Katherine Barrell; Tim Rozon; Sai Bennett; Luke Newton; Craig Stein; Joe Pantoliano
- Music by: James Matthes; Andries Smit
- Countries of origin: South Africa; United States
- Original language: English

Production
- Producer: Lance Samuels
- Cinematography: Trevor Calverley
- Editor: Christopher Minns
- Running time: 93 minutes
- Production companies: Destination Films; Blue Ice Pictures

Original release
- Network: Syfy
- Release: May 28, 2018

Lake Placid: Legacy is a 2018 American-South African made-for-television science fiction horror film directed by Darrell Roodt and stars Katherine Barrell, Tim Rozon, Sai Bennett, Luke Newton, Craig Stein and Joe Pantoliano. The film premiered on Syfy on May 28, 2018. It is a standalone sequel to Lake Placid vs. Anaconda (2015), which serves as the sixth and final installment in the Lake Placid film series. The film has its own story that tells the origin of how the crocodiles got to be in Lake Placid.

== Plot ==
A group of activists consisting of siblings Jade and Alice, Jade's boyfriend Sam, their friends Billy and Spencer, travel to an island in the middle of a lake, accompanied by rangers Pennie and Travis. They look for Sam's friend, Dane, who sent them a video message challenging them to visit an old research facility on the island.

Upon arriving at the island, they find the corpse of Dane's friend Gomez in a tree. They discover Dane's camera, in which he talks about a man named Henderson who supposedly abandoned him before being attacked by something. The group attempts to leave, but the boat drifts away from the island with Travis on it, and Pennie is dragged into the water by a rope. When Travis attempts to save her, he's attacked and killed by a creature. Sam manages to save Pennie, whose leg is injured. The group is stranded on the island.

The survivors find and enter the facility to look for help. They again run into the creature, revealed to be a 30-foot crocodile. Billy, Spencer, and Pennie split away from the rest of the group. Billy goes down to a dock to an electrical outlet in order to call the police, but loses signal. The crocodile pulls Spencer into the water and kills him. Pennie urges Billy to find the others while she distracts the crocodile. The crocodile follows Pennie into a tunnel where it quickly kills her.

Jade, Sam, and Alice soon find Dane, who is alive and shows them to Henderson, the facility's former employee. Henderson was involved in a project to weaponize crocodiles. When the program was shut down, a few juvenile samples were stolen, which he later retrieved. He used Dane and Gomez to get back into the facility to continue the experiments. Meanwhile, Billy reaches another building, and manages to contact the other survivors, although he's soon killed when the crocodile breaks in. Henderson escapes in the chaos and Jade, Sam, Alice, and Dane make an attempt to escape. Henderson attempts to trap the group in the facility by flooding it, although they manage to swim through the flood, and escape into another section of the facility.

The crocodile soon catches up to the group and eats Dane. Henderson tries to capture it, only for it to kill him.

Jade, Sam, and Alice find a room with several gas cans, which gives Sam an idea to kill the crocodile. He begins releasing the gas and urges Jade and Alice to escape while he stays behind. As the crocodile enters, Sam attempts to ignite the gas with a flare. The flare shorts out, allowing the crocodile to eat him. The crocodile chases Jade and Alice in the woods and eventually corners Alice, but Jade traps it with an excavator. She ignites the excavator's fuel with a lighter, killing it.

Jade and Alice begin swimming back to the mainland, unaware of a second crocodile in the water.

== Cast ==
- Katherine Barrell as Jade
- Tim Rozon as Sam
- Sai Bennett as Alice
- Luke Newton as Billy
- Craig Stein as Spencer
- Joe Pantoliano as Henderson
- Alisha Bailey as Pennie
- Maxim Baldry as Dane
- Greg Kriek as Travis
- Gavin Lee Gomes as Gomez

== Production ==
Principal photography took place in the vicinity of Cape Town, South Africa in December 2017.

== Home media ==
Lake Placid: Legacy was released on DVD and digital on September 4, 2018.

== See also ==
- List of killer crocodile films
