= Notzilla =

2019 American comedy monster film

- Promotional release poster
- Directed by: Mitch Teemley
- Written by: Mitch Teemley
- Produced by: Aymie Majerski; Ekim Relgrem; Mitch Teemley
- Starring: Frederic Eng-Li; Tifani Ahren Davis; Tim Bensch; Samantha Russell; Michael Bath
- Cinematography: Jeff Barklage
- Edited by: James Paul Bailey
- Music by: Stephen Goers
- Distributed by: Indie Rights
- Release date: July 2019 (G-Fest)
- Running time: 78 minutes
- Country: United States
- Language: English

Notzilla is a 2019 American monster comedy film written and directed by Mitch Teemley. A parody of Japanese kaiju films, particularly those in the Godzilla franchise from Toho, the film stars Frederic Eng-Li, Tifani Ahren Davis, Tim Bensch, Samantha Russell, and Michael Bath.

== Plot ==
In 1962, the JSDF kills a mother kaiju, Notzilla, despite the protestations of paleontologist Dr. Itchihiro "Hiro" Honda, who believes he can restore her to her normal, smaller size. He rescues her egg, and takes it to Ohio, but accidentally flushes it down the jet-powered airplane toilet. Ejected from the plane, it falls into the Ohio River. The scientists of Cincinnati's Secret Nuclear Underground Government Installation (SNUGI) convene, conducted by SNUGI's head, Dr. Richard Blowheart. After another nuclear reactor test ends in an explosion, Richard and his assistant Dr. Shirley Yujest spot the Notzilla egg in the river, and Richard takes it. It's explained that when the species "Notzillasaurus Partiontildon" consumes alcohol it grows to abnormal proportions. Later that day, the Notzilla hatches, and immediately begins dinking all of Richard's beer.

Notzilla continues to grow, and escapes. Hiro wants to save the monster, while Richard wants to exterminate him. The SNUGI scientists search for him in their research vessel the Pseudoscientifica. When the now-immense Notzilla surfaces, a stowaway, Bobby, believing Notzilla has killed his grandfather, leaps onto his back with a handgun. Upon learning his grandfather is still alive, Bobby throws the handgun onto the deck. The sound startles Notzilla, who rushes away.

Hiro admits he was responsible for Notzilla coming to America. Richard contacts The Pentagon for help in destroying Notzilla, but as most of the armed forces are preoccupied with the Cuban Missile Crisis, he can only reach Frigidair General Dirk Bogus, "head of military refrigeration for all of Southwestern Ohio." Rockets, shells, and missiles have no effect on Notzilla, who knocks over vehicles and soldiers "as if they were nothing but toys!" A squadron of fighter jets arrives, but Notzilla grabs and cuts the wires they are hanging from. Planning to follow the monster to Cincinnati, Bogus asks Richard if SNUGI happens to have any super-secret weapons lying around, prompting Richard to unveil his Super-Secret Uber-Fission Mega Blaster.

Hiro confronts Richard, who mentions that, as a side effect, his weapon will irradiate Cincinnati for the next 50 years. Hiro, who has a black belt in haiku, immobilizes Richard by reciting profoundly beautiful poetry. Shirley shares with Hiro her theory of "warm fusion", which potentially holds the key to returning Notzilla to his normal size.

Notzilla menaces a train by peeling the "passengers" off its backlit windows, while Hiro joins forces with local brewmeister Fritz Übertrinker, using Shirley's warm fusion to develop an "anti-beer" formula. Despite the danger to Cincinnati, Richard rallies his colleagues to help him build his Mega-Blaster. Bogus faces Notzilla again, but fails. As the two teams of scientists continue their work, Bogus sets another ineffective trap for the monster with high-tension wires; with a blimp tucked under his arm, the monster runs a "touchdown" under the wires. Notzilla then makes his way through the streets of Cincinnati, emitting fiery burps. He picks up Shirley, but she manages to communicate with him, directing him to put out the fires he's set (unfortunately, he does so with a spray of urine). Then, setting her down, he leaves the city.

Shirley returns to SNUGI and reveals Richard's secret: he's not a real scientist, but former child movie star Donnie Draper. This delights Dr. Butay, but horrifies the other physicists. Shirley encourages them to sabotage the Mega-Blaster. Richard/Donnie unveils the weapon at Big Finale Ridge and Dr. Butay aims it toward the city, but it shorts-out (sabotaged by the other scientists). Notzilla arrives and presents Shirley with a bouquet of trees. Hiro shows up in a flatbed truck, with the anti-beer formula stored inside an enormous beer can. Drinking it, Notzilla is reduced to his natural size, to the delight of nearly all. Dr. Butay, however, unveils a super-secret alternative power switch. As Richard/Donnie reaches to push the button, the rest of the cast leaps in front of the monster, declaring (a la Spartacus) that they too are Notzilla. Hiro rams the beer can with the truck, knocking it into the death-ray's path, causing it to spray the formula onto Butay and Richard/Donnie. As a result, both shrink to the size of dolls. 4-Star General Specific arrives, tipped off by ace reporter Pearl Stringer. Gen. Specific appoints Shirley as the new head of SNUGI, and Hiro as director of the Pentagon's nascent Giant Monster Protection Program, tasked with protecting the world from "sequels!"

In the aftermath, Shirley and Hiro adopt Notzilla, who carries around Dr. Butay and Donnie in a toy car. Hiro asks Shirley about adopting more kids, just as three new Notzilla eggs float ashore.

== Cast ==
- Frederic Eng-Li as Prof. Hiro Honda
- Tifani Ahren Davis as Dr. Shirley Yujest
- Tim Bensch as Dr. Richard Blowheart
- Samantha Russell as Pearl Stringer
- Michael Bath as Gen. Dirk Bogus
- Becca Kravitz as Dr. Jacques Butay
- Spencer Lackey as Bobby Bleech

== Release ==
Notzilla had its world premiere at G-Fest XXVI in Rosemont, Illinois, In July 2019, followed by film festival appearances (see Accolades below). It was officially released on Amazon Prime in August 2020 and has since expanded to Blu-ray and DVD release, as well as additional streaming services worldwide.

== Reception ==
Upon its release, Kevin Burwick of MovieWeb called Notzilla "a spoof with a hint of Gremlins" that "looks like it could be a cult classic". Bradley Gibson, writing for Film Threat said, "It might have worked better as a short, as there's just not enough juice here to sustain a feature-length production" giving Notzilla a 6/10 rating. Viewers on Amazon Prime give it a 4.3 out 5, comparing it to Airplane!, and reminiscing about the 50s and 60s "creature features" it spoofs.

== Accolades ==
Year	Award	Category	Recipient	Result	Ref(s)
2020	Florida Comedy Film Festival	Best Feature Film	Notzilla, Mitch Teemley	Won	
2020	Florida Comedy Film Festival	Best Actress in a Feature Film	Tifani Ahren Davis	Won	
2020	Con Nooga Film Festival	Best in Show	Mitch Teemley	Won	
2020	Will Rogers Motion Picture Festival	Best Comedy Feature	Mitch Teemley	Won	
2020	Simply Indie Film Fest	Best Actress, Feature	Tifani Ahren Davis	Won	
2020	Top Indie Film Awards	Best Humor	Mitch Teemley	Won	
2020	Top Indie Film Awards	Best Sound	Stephen Goers	Won	

== Comics Adaptation ==
Notzilla movie has a comic book adaptation. Ninja High School and Warrior Nun creator Ben Dunn has teamed up with Mitch Teemley to create a 56-page, full-color graphic novel.

- Written by Mitch Teemley
- Storyboards by Lukman Hadi
- Art by Zumart Putra
- In conjunction by Metakomik Studio
- Coloring by Shantona Shantuma

COVER VARIANTS:

- Ben Dunn softcover edition
- Fred Perry softcover edition
- Andri Evaria softcover edition
- Hiroshi Kanatani hardcover version
