= Konga TNT =

- Theatrical release poster
- Directed by: Brett Kelly
- Screenplay by: Trevor Payer
- Story by: Brett Kelly
- Produced by: Brett Kelly; John Migliore; Trevor Payer
- Starring: John Migliore; Jennie Russo; Steve Kasan; Chance Kelly; Jordan Randall; Grayson Kelly
- Cinematography: Scott Patrick; Angela Migliore; Rhys Payer; Mitchell Silby Brown
- Edited by: Brett Kelly
- Music by: Kevin MacLeod
- Production company: Gray Chance Entertainment
- Distributed by: Gray Chance Entertainment
- Release date: October 2020
- Running time: 73 minutes
- Country: Canada
- Language: English

Konga TNT is a 2020 Canadian action comedy film based on the Charlton Comics series Konga. It stars John Migliore, Jennie Russo, Steve Kasan, Chance Kelly, Jordan Randall, and Grayson Kelly. In the film, a formula from an alien ship has been injected with a lab gorilla who escapes his containment and befriends two young boys. As a result of the alien formula, the gorilla grows to gigantic proportions and rampages through the city. The boys must find a way to save their simian friend before the army does.

== Plot ==
An F-15 Eagle sorties with orders to locate a target over 50 meters tall somewhere in the city below. Flying low, the jet becomes easy prey for an enormous gorilla, who dispatches it with a swing of his hand.

One week earlier, an alien ship crashes in the Amazon. After a local tribe take the ship's power source, General Mills dispatches famed tracker Skipper Smith and his assistant Marion Kind to retrieve it. To Smith's delight, all of the members of the tribe are woman. Distracted, he and Marion are easily abducted and taken before their queen, Peggy, who wears the power source as an amulet. She shows them mercy, allowing them to stay for the night. Smith seduces her, convincing her to take off the amulet, then dashes away with it. Marion calls in a seaplane, and they bring the artifact to Professor Mills, the general's twin brother. He dubs the substance inside it KTNT and attempts to splice its DNA with that of a houseplant, with dismal results. Next he experiments on a monkey, who puts up a fierce fight before taking the KTNT in pill form. As he observes the results, two terrorists break into his facility. He sets the monkey free, but they shoot him before he can destroy his research.

Fleeing to the suburbs, the monkey rests in a shed. General Mills is informed of his brother's death and the theft of the alien technology. He orders a search for the escaped test subject, calling the retired Major Bummier back into the field. Two boys, Chance and Grayson, discover the monkey after he eats their snacks. Naming him Konga, they agree to keep him a secret from their mother. Bummier, traveling door to door, asks her if she's seen an escaped ape. The boys play in their backyard with Konga, who suddenly grows to enormous size and rushes past Bummier.

Konga terrifies a farmer before growing again, bursting through the roof of his barn. Spotting a beautiful blonde woman in her bedroom, he abducts her just to give her a kiss on the head. In Jackson Park, all of the fleeing citizens start to depress him. Moving downtown, his clumsiness causes mass destruction, toppling buildings and cooling towers. A passing airliner catches his attention, and he snatches it out of the sky. Chance tries to lures him away by dressing up as a hot dog, but the military nonetheless assails the monster with tanks and fighter jets. Suddenly, Konga returns to his original size, and the boys embrace him. Charmed, Bummier reports to Mills that Konga escaped, and announces his second honorable discharge. Professor Mills, miraculously alive, explains to his brother that Konga's body eventually rejected KTNT, allowing him to shrink. Another drop of KTNT allowed him to survive being shot.

In a post-credits scene, Chance and Grayson discover a large egg in the woods.

== Cast ==
- John Migliore as General Mills / Professor Mills / Konga
- Steve Kasan as Dave
- Chance Kelly as Chance / Alien
- Jennie Russo as Blonde Lady
- Jordan Randall as Phone guy
- Sophie Godin as Pilot (voice)
- Dove Kennedy as Jungle Girl
- Christina Roman as Jungle Girl
- Kim Valentine as Jungle Girl
- Glena Chao as Jungle Girl
- Jessica Huether as Jungle Girl
- Kendra Summerfield as Jungle girls
- Grayson Kelly as Grayson

== Production and release ==
The film was released on VHS and Blu-ray in October 2020 by SRS Cinema, with presales started as early as September 10 of 2020. As of March 18, 2021, Konga TNT in a DVD format and to stream.

== Reception ==
Jim Morazzini of Voices from the Balcony said the film was "So bad I'm tempted to add another star to his last film, Ouija Shark, because this makes it look that much better." Phil Wheat, writing for Nerdly, complimented the film's similarities to Brett Kelly's Ouija Shark.
