= Lake Placid 3 =

2010 film by Griff Furst

- Official DVD cover
- Written by: David Reed
- Directed by: Griff Furst
- Starring: Colin Ferguson; Yancy Butler; Kirsty Mitchell; Kacey Clarke; Jordan Grehs; Michael Ironside
- Music by: Nathan Furst
- Country of origin: United States
- Original language: English

Production
- Producers: Jeffery Beach; Phillip Roth
- Cinematography: Anton Bakarski
- Editor: Matt Michael
- Running time: 96 minutes
- Production companies: Stage 6 Films; UFO International

Original release
- Network: Syfy
- Release: August 21, 2010

Related
- Lake Placid 2 (2007); Lake Placid: The Final Chapter (2012)

Lake Placid 3 is a 2010 American made-for-television comedy horror film directed by Griff Furst. It is a sequel to Lake Placid 2 (2007) and the third installment in the Lake Placid film series. The film premiered on August 21, 2010 on Syfy, and was released to DVD later that year.

== Plot ==
At Black Lake, in Aroostook County, Maine, young couple April and Jason go skinny dipping and are attacked and killed by juvenile crocodiles. (Note: This takes place a year after the events of the second film.) Meanwhile, at the house of the deceased Sadie Bickerman, her nephew Nathan, his wife Susan, and their son Connor, are cleaning out the house so they can sell it. However, sheriff Tony Willinger soon arrives, and convinces Nathan and Susan not to sell. Connor chases an escaped pet lizard down to the lake and encounters the juvenile crocodiles that eat the lizard and begins to secretly feed them.

Two years later, Connor has continued to feed the now adult crocodiles stolen meat from the supermarket, but is soon caught for shoplifting by Dimitri and sent home by Susan to his babysitter Vica. However, Connor goes to the lake to feed the crocodiles, followed by Vica; who is attacked while her dog Teddy is eaten. Vica, whose arm is badly injured, finds Susan at Sadie's house, where they tend to Vica's arm and Connor confesses to feeding the crocodiles out of spite for a pet and due to the fact that his parents haven't been spending time with him. Meanwhile, Nathan is searching the lake; due to a number of elk disappearances. He meets four teenagers - Ellie, Tara, Aaron and Charlie - who are camping on the lake. The teenagers show Nathan an elk head they previously found, leading Nathan to believe that it was the act of hunter Reba, but the head disappears before he can show it to Tony. Nevertheless, he persuades Tony to search the lake to ensure that it is clear of crocodiles. While the teenagers camp, they decide to go swimming and the girls go into the woods to strip off their clothes and get into their bikinis. Charlie spies on them and watches them stripping their clothes and taking pictures, but he is then eaten by a crocodile.

Reba is approached by teenager Brett, to help him find his girlfriend Ellie; who he fears will be taken advantage of by Aaron. Reba agrees and takes Brett out onto the lake in her boat with Jonas and Walt. As they stop to hunt elk, a crocodile attacks the boat and knocks the group into the water. Walt is devoured, but the others escape to shore and are stranded in the woods. After hours, Ellie and Aaron search for the missing Charlie, leaving Tara by the lake where she is killed by a crocodile. Ellie and Aaron return to find her missing, so they decide to try and get help. They discover Charlie's corpse, then find Brett's jacket. Ellie decides to search for Brett, upsetting Aaron; who walks the other way, only to be attacked by a crocodile.

After searching the lake, Nathan and Tony arrive at Sadie's house and join Susan, Connor and Vica. They decide to try and escape from the house to go to a hospital, but as they do so, Vica and Tony are devoured, and the car is submerged in the lake. Nathan, Susan and Connor take shelter in the house. Meanwhile, Brett, Reba and Jonas manage to shoot a crocodile dead, but another crocodile arrives and decapitates Jonas before attacking Reba; who manages to escape. Desperate, Reba wants to get to safety, but Brett doesn't want to give up his search, forcing Reba to knock him out and travel to Sadie's house on her boat and meet with Nathan, Susan, and Connor. Determined to find Ellie, Brett uses a gun to prevent the others from stopping him and escapes to Reba's boat to find her. He finds Ellie, but a crocodile kills him.

Reba kills a crocodile that breaks into the house, then leaves with Nathan, Susan, and Connor. Ellie joins them and they make it to the town. The group break into the supermarket to call for help, setting off the alarm, but the store's phone is broken. Their actions attract Dimitri, but he is swiftly devoured as a group of crocodiles enter the supermarket. The group is ambushed, but manage to kill most of the crocodiles, but Reba is (seemingly) killed in the process. The only remaining crocodile chases Nathan, Susan, Ellie, and Connor to the gas station, where the group manage to ignite gas with a lighter, causing an explosion that kills the crocodile. An ambulance then comes and helps Nathan, Susan, Ellie and Connor.

Sometime later, Nathan is taking a group of tourists around the lake, telling them of the crocodiles that are believed to be extinct. However, a crocodile hatchling and an adult crocodile are seen swimming in the lake. The crocodile comes lunging at the camera ending the film.

== Cast ==
- Colin Ferguson as Nathan Bickerman
- Yancy Butler as Reba, Hunting Guide
- Kirsty Mitchell as Susan Bickerman
- Kacey Clarke as Ellie
- Jordan Grehs as Connor Bickerman
- Michael Ironside as Sheriff Tony Willinger
- Mark Evans as Brett
- Nils Hognestad as Aaron
- Bianca Ilich as Vica
- Angelica Penn as Tara
- Brian Landon as Charlie Berman
- Atanas Srebrev as Jonas
- Donald Anderson as Walt
- Roxanne Pallett as April
- James Marchant as Jason
- Velizar Binev as Dimitri
- John Laskowski as Station Attendant
- Ivo Simeonov as Town Drunk
- Kremena Otashliyska as Girl

== Reception ==
David Nusair of Reelfilm.com called it "...just another needless direct-to-video horror sequel" and gave it 1.5 out of 4 stars. Ken Tucker of Entertainment Weekly gave the film a negative review, calling it "the Syfy channel's latest new junk horror film". He had some praise for Ferguson who "did his job as well as possible under the circumstances" and Butler, but missed the presence of Betty White from the first film.

== Home media ==
Lake Placid 3 was released to DVD on October 26, 2010. The DVD is an unrated version and contains scenes of nudity.

== Sequel ==
A sequel titled Lake Placid: The Final Chapter, was released in 2012.

== See also ==
- List of killer crocodile films
