= Lake Placid 2 =

2007 film by David Flores

- DVD cover
- Written by: Todd Hurvitz; Howie Miller
- Directed by: David Flores
- Starring: John Schneider; Sarah Lafleur; Sam McMurray; Chad Michael Collins; Alicia Ziegler; Joe Holt; Ian Reed Kesler; Justin Ulrich; Cloris Leachman
- Music by: Nathan Furst
- Country of origin: United States
- Original language: English

Production
- Producers: Jeffery Beach; Phillip Roth
- Cinematography: Lorenzo Senatore
- Editor: John Quinn
- Running time: 88 minutes
- Production companies: 20th Century Fox Home Entertainment; Sony Pictures Home Entertainment; Sci Fi Pictures

Original release
- Network: Sci Fi
- Release: April 28, 2007

Related
- Lake Placid (1999); Lake Placid 3 (2010)

Lake Placid 2 is a 2007 American made-for-television comedy horror film directed by David Flores. It is a sequel to Lake Placid (1999) and the second installment in the Lake Placid film series, telling the story of man-eating crocodiles who terrorize the local community. The film premiered on April 28, 2007 on Sci Fi and was released direct to video on January 29, 2008.

== Plot ==
Researchers Frank Mills and Tillman are exploring the lake on a rubber tube raft until something drags Tillman into the water and eats him up, with a hand and a foot remaining. In Aroostook County, Maine, Frank reports this to sheriff James Riley, showing him Tillman's severed body parts. James, Frank, and wildlife officer Emma Warner venture out onto the lake and find more of Tillman's remains. Meanwhile, friends Mike, Edie, and Sharon are hiking in the forest and disappear in the lake, after stopping by to swim together. James, Emma and Frank stop at the house of Sadie Bickerman, an elderly hermit who has allegedly been feeding crocodiles in the lake, to interrogate her about her missing sister Delores, but she refuses to answer nor let them in the house. James, Frank and Emma eventually realize this was all the doings of some giant crocodile, after it attacks them and destroys their boat. Poacher Jack Struthers and his assistant Ahmad land their plane on the lake, hoping to kill the crocodiles after getting a tip from a local.

The sheriff's son, Scott Riley, wanders into the woods, and meets Kerri and her boyfriend, Thad. Daisy, the pet dog of Kerri, barks at something moving in the lake, but Kerri sees nothing. Sadie talks with a photographer at a boat dock before returning to her cabin, and the photographer is killed by a crocodile while taking pictures.

Riding the boat again, James slows down, knocking Frank into the lake, but James and Emma bring him back on board to safety. When a crocodile appears, James draws his gun, but the crocodile dives under to knock the three off the boat. The boat is demolished, and all three get to land unharmed. They meet Struthers and Ahmad, who flew a plane to distract the crocodile.

Meanwhile, Rachel, Larry, Scott, Kerri, and Thad venture in the woods to another part of the lake. With the Sheriff's team, Deputy Dale Davis comes in to unload the boat, while the crew sets up a tent for overnight camping. They see a wild boar trapped in a rope net and feed it to the crocodile. The crew neutralizes the crocodile with their guns and Dale ties the mouth with a rope, but the crocodile easily breaks free, severs Dale's arm and devours him. Frank dies from a fall.

Meanwhile, Rachel is killed by the crocodile who splits her in half, while Larry escapes. The other three of the younger group find eggs in the woods. Thad breaks some eggs and is killed by a crocodile. The Sheriff's group feed a boar carcass to one crocodile but a harpoon arrow accidentally damages Struthers' plane. James and Ahmad abandon the boat, and Struthers is thrown off the plane, but Ahmad neutralizes the crocodile. Thunderstorms strike during the night, forcing the crew to their tents. Scott and Kerri are stranded in the woods until they find a horrified Larry. The Sheriff's crew is fast asleep in their tents until the crocodile attacks and kills Ahmad.

The next morning, Scott, Kerri, and Larry climb a tree to avoid a third crocodile, but Larry falls from the tree and is killed. James finds the two surviving teenagers, and kills the crocodile with a grenade launcher. Sadie lets the teenagers inside her house for safety and reveals that there are actually four crocodiles before tricking them into entering the lake in hopes of feeding them to the crocodiles and is then devoured by a crocodile herself. The police battles one crocodile, and Emma kills it by puncturing its mouth with a jackknife. Struthers hangs upside down on a tree and he is decapitated by the last crocodile. James kills it with explosive substances that destroys the crocodile's nest.

Scott, Kerri, James, and Emma later leave the lake together. Scott and Kerri reunite with Daisy, who got separated from them earlier, and the two kiss. James and Emma proceed to take the crocodile's eggs that Emma took from the nest earlier to the scientific lab for analysis.

== Cast ==
- John Schneider as Sheriff James Riley
- Sarah Lafleur as Emily "Emma" Warner
- Sam McMurray as Jack Struthers
- Chad Michael Collins as Scott Riley
- Alicia Ziegler as Kerri
- Joe Holt as Ahmad
- Cloris Leachman as Sadie Bickerman
- Ian Reed Kesler as Thad Sanders
- Justin Urich as Larry
- V.J. Benson as Rachel
- Robert Blush as Frank Mills
- Jonas Talkington as Cal Miner
- Terence H. Winkless as Deputy Dale Davis
- Michael McCoy as Tillman
- Andrea Enright as Female Deputy
- Jasmina Toshkova as Edi
- Vlado Mihaylov as Mike
- Yana Marinova as Sharon

== Production ==
The film was filmed in Bulgaria in 2006.

== Reception ==
The film received generally negative reviews, citing an unoriginal plot and low-budget special effects. It has a rating of 11% on Rotten Tomatoes based on 9 reviews, with an average rating of 3.70/10.

== Home media ==
Lake Placid 2 was released to DVD on January 29, 2008 on both rated and unrated versions. The unrated Blu-ray was released in 2011.

== Sequel ==
A sequel titled Lake Placid 3, was released in 2010.

== See also ==
- List of killer crocodile films
