= Lake Placid (film) =

1999 film by Steve Miner

- Theatrical release poster
- Directed by: Steve Miner
- Written by: David E. Kelley
- Produced by: David E. Kelley; Michael Pressman
- Starring: Bill Pullman; Bridget Fonda; Oliver Platt; Brendan Gleeson; Betty White; Meredith Salenger
- Cinematography: Daryn Okada
- Edited by: Paul Hirsch; Marshall Harvey
- Music by: John Ottman
- Production companies: Fox 2000 Pictures; Phoenix Pictures; Rocking Chair Productions
- Distributed by: 20th Century Fox
- Release date: July 16, 1999
- Running time: 82 minutes
- Country: United States
- Language: English
- Budget: $27–35 million
- Box office: $56.9 million

Lake Placid is a 1999 American comedy horror film directed by Steve Miner and written by David E. Kelley. It is the first installment in the Lake Placid film series. The film stars Bill Pullman, Bridget Fonda, Brendan Gleeson, Oliver Platt, Betty White, and Meredith Salenger. Its story follows a giant crocodile terrorizing the fictional location of Black Lake, Maine, while a dysfunctional group of police and scientists attempt to capture or kill the beast.

Lake Placid was released in the United States on July 16, 1999, by 20th Century Fox. The film received generally negative reviews from critics and grossed $56.9 million against a $27–35 million budget.

== Plot ==
In Aroostook County, Maine, Department of Inland Fisheries & Wildlife officer Walt Lawson is scuba diving in Black Lake, supervised by Sheriff Hank Keough. The officer is suddenly attacked, and bitten in half by an unknown creature.

United States Fish and Wildlife Service officer Jack Wells, American Museum of Natural History paleontologist Kelly Scott, and Hank decide to investigate the incident. They are joined by Hector Cyr, a wealthy mythology professor and crocodile enthusiast, who suspects the culprit to be a freshwater crocodile, much to the disbelief of the group.

During the group's search on the lake, Kelly and Hank's canoe is flipped over, including the discovery of a severed human toe and a moose head. Hank's deputy Burke is killed when his head is bitten off, which confirms Hector's suspicions, although Hank remains skeptical. That evening, the group make camp and prepare a plan to capture the unseen creature.

The next day, a large bear ambushes Hank and Hector, when a gigantic 32 ft (9.8 m) long saltwater crocodile suddenly emerges, and drags the bear away. The group discover local resident Delores Bickerman, an elderly widow living near the lake, feeding a blindfolded dairy cow to a nearby crocodile. She reveals that she had been feeding it for years, after the crocodile devoured her husband.

Hector and Deputy Sharon Gare take a helicopter onto the lake to separately locate the crocodile by landing directly in its territory. While scuba diving, Hector is confronted, but he manages to escape with Gare by distracting it with an inflatable raft. Hank and Jack call in the Florida Fish and Wildlife Conservation Commission to help capture and kill the crocodile. Hector suggests luring it out of the water and tranquilizing it instead. Jack reluctantly accepts the proposal, and they use one of Bickerman's cattle dangled from the helicopter as bait. With the crocodile being elusive, the capture fails forcing the team to devise another plan.

By nightfall, the team assemble on the lakeshore to trap, tranquilize, and capture the crocodile, using Hector's helicopter to dangle the cow as bait in order to lure it out of the water. After revealing itself, Jack fires a tranquilizer dart into its neck with a clear shot. Hector loses control and crashes yards away into the water. The crocodile then comes on land and pursues the team. Kelly is knocked into the lake by the crocodile's tail and manages to swim towards the downed helicopter, before the crocodile seizes her. It becomes trapped as it tries to attack Hector and Kelly, before being seemingly neutralized by another tranquilizer.

Jack, Hector, and Hank argue about whether to kill or spare the crocodile. Jack eventually grabs Hank's gun and shoots it, but the firearm turns out to be another tranquilizer. As Hector and Kelly emerge from the water, another crocodile appears, but Hank blows it up with a grenade launcher. Soon after, Florida wildlife officers arrive to take the last crocodile away to Portland, Maine, to decide what to do next with it.

One week later, Bickerman is feeding bread crumbs to many baby crocodiles, revealing the two adult crocodiles were actually a mating pair. The only surviving crocodile is seen tied to the back of a flatbed trailer traveling down the highway.

== Cast ==
- Bill Pullman as Jack Wells
- Bridget Fonda as Kelly Scott
- Brendan Gleeson as Sheriff Hank Keough
- Oliver Platt as Hector Cyr
- Betty White as Mrs. Delores Bickerman
- Meredith Salenger as Deputy Sharon Gare
- David Lewis as Walt Lawson
- Tim Dixon as Stephen Daniels
- Natassia Malthe as Janine
- Mariska Hargitay as Myra Okubo
- Jed Rees as Deputy Burke
- Richard Leacock as Deputy Stevens
- Jake T. Roberts as Officer Coulson
- Ty Olsson as State Trooper
- Steve Miner as Airplane Pilot
- Adam Arkin as Kevin (uncredited)

== Production ==
Lake Placid was produced by Fox 2000 Pictures, Phoenix Pictures, and Rocking Chair Productions. The 32-foot (9.8 m) long crocodile was created by Stan Winston Studios and was operated by aquatic hydraulics.

Some of the film's scenes were shot in Vancouver and Surrey, British Columbia. Three different lakes in British Columbia stood in for the fictional "Black Lake": Shawnigan Lake, Buntzen Lake and Hayward Lake.

Most of the crocodile vocalizations were recorded from alligators in Orlando, Florida, at Gatorland.

Highlight David E. Kelley's unusual transition from writing critically acclaimed, dialogue-heavy TV court dramas (Ally McBeal, The Practice) to a quick-pitted monster movie screenplay.

== Music ==
Soundtrack for the film score, composed and conducted by John Ottman, was released by Varèse Sarabande.

== Reception ==
On review aggregator website Rotten Tomatoes, the film has an approval rating of 47% based on 95 reviews, with an average rating of 5.10/10. The site's critics consensus reads, "Betty White's delightful supporting turn may be worth the price of admission alone, but Lake Placid is swamped by a smarmy script and inability to deliver on the creature feature mayhem". On Metacritic, the film has a weighted average score of 34 out of 100, based on 25 critics, indicating "generally unfavorable" reviews. Audiences polled by CinemaScore gave the film an average grade of "C" on an A+ to F scale.

Roger Ebert of the Chicago Sun-Times gave the film one out of four stars, describing it as "completely wrong-headed from beginning to end". He put it on his list of the 10 Worst Films of the Year. Andrew Collins of Empire gave the film four out of five stars, writing that "you can enjoy Placid as a straightforward camping-holiday nightmare, or as a sly, ironic take on the same. It works deliciously as both". Public reaction to the film mirrored the critics' issues and critiques as Lake Placid grossed $56.9 million worldwide. Subsequently, the film was followed by five low-budget made-for-television sequels, starting with Lake Placid 2 in 2007.

== Sequel ==
A sequel, Lake Placid 2, was released in 2007.

== See also ==
- List of killer crocodile films
- Deinosuchus
