= List of natural horror films =

Natural horror is a subgenre of horror films in which nature runs amok, typically in the form of animals or plants that pose a threat to human characters. The genre generally focuses on ordinary animals that become hostile or unusually aggressive toward humans, often in isolated environments such as forests, oceans, or rural communities. In many cases the animals are portrayed as reacting to ecological disruption or human intrusion into natural habitats.

Although killer animals in film have existed since the release of The Lost World in 1925, two of the first motion pictures to garner mainstream success with a "nature runs amok" premise were The Birds, directed by Alfred Hitchcock and released in 1963; and Jaws, directed by Steven Spielberg and released in 1975. The popularity of animal-attack narratives increased during the 1970s and 1980s, when a number of films depicted predatory wildlife threatening groups of people or small towns. These films were often marketed as suspense thrillers but are frequently categorized within the horror genre due to their focus on fear, survival, and violent encounters with animals.

The genre is often associated with eco-horror, which is concerned with environmental themes and the consequences of human interference with the natural world. However, whilst eco-horror typically emphasizes environmental damage or ecological collapse caused by human activity, natural horror more broadly focuses on fear generated by encounters with dangerous wildlife or hostile natural forces.

== Arthropods ==
See also the section on insects.

=== Arachnids ===
- Kingdom of the Spiders (1977; tarantulas)
- Tarantulas: The Deadly Cargo (1977; banana spiders)
- Arachnophobia (1990; spiders)
- Ticks (1993; giant ticks)
- Eight Legged Freaks (2002; giant spiders)
- Big Ass Spider! (2013; a giant spider)
- Lavalantula (2015; giant lava-breathing tarantulas)

=== Crustaceans ===
- The Bay (2012; isopods)

== Birds ==
- The Birds (1963; flocks of gulls, crows, sparrows and other birds)
  - The Birds II: Land's End (1994)
- Beaks: The Movie (1987)
- Kaw (2007; ravens)
- Birdemic: Shock and Terror (2010; mutated birds)
  - Birdemic 2: The Resurrection (2013; mutated birds)

== Fish ==
=== Piranhas ===
- Piranha (1978; genetically enhanced piranhas)
  - Piranha II: The Spawning (1982; mutant piranhas)
  - Piranha 3D (2010; prehistoric piranhas)
  - Piranha 3DD (2012; prehistoric piranhas)
- Piranha (1995; killer piranhas)

=== Sharks ===
- Jaws (1975; a large great white shark)
  - Jaws 2 (1978; a great white shark)
  - Jaws 3-D (1983; a great white shark)
- Up from the Depths (1979; a prehistoric shark)
- Great White (1981; a great white shark)
- Deep Blood (1989; a great white shark)
- Cruel Jaws (1995; a great white shark)
- Deep Blue Sea (1999; large genetically engineered shortfin mako sharks)
- Shark Attack (1999; a great white shark)
  - Shark Attack 2 (2000; great white shark)
  - Shark Attack 3: Megalodon (2002; a Megalodon)
- Megalodon (2002; a Megalodon)
- Red Water (2003; a bull shark)
- Shark Zone (2003; great white sharks)
- Open Water (2003, Caribbean reef sharks)
- Blue Demon (2004; a great white shark)
- 12 Days of Terror (2004; a great white shark)
- Shark Swarm (2008; a great white shark, a mako shark, and a thresher shark)
- Shark in Venice (2008; great white sharks)
- Malibu Shark Attack (2009; goblin sharks)
- The Reef (2010; a great white shark)
- Shark Night (2011; a great white shark, a bull shark, a hammerhead shark, cookiecutter sharks, and sand tiger sharks)
- Jurassic Shark (2012; a prehistoric great white shark)
- Bait (2012; two great white sharks)
- 2-Headed Shark Attack (2012; a mutated great white shark)
- Sharknado (2013; swarms of various species of sharks carried by tornadoes).
- 47 Meters Down: Uncaged (2019; cave-dwelling great white sharks)
- Great White (2021; two great white sharks)
- The Requin (2022; a great white shark)

== Insects ==
=== Ants ===
- The Naked Jungle (1954; army ants)
- Them! (1954; giant mutated ants)
- Phase IV (1974; super-intelligent ants of various species)
- Empire of the Ants (1977; large mutated ants)
- It Happened at Lakewood Manor (1977)

=== Honey bees ===
- The Deadly Bees (1966)
- Killer Bees (1974)
- The Savage Bees (1976)
- The Bees (1978)
- The Swarm (1978)
- Deadly Invasion: The Killer Bee Nightmare (1995)

=== Cockroaches ===
- Creepshow (1982, killer cockroaches)
- Mimic (1997, evolved human-sized genetically engineered cockroaches)

=== Locusts ===
- Locusts: The 8th Plague (2005)

=== Wasps ===
- Stung (2015; large mutated wasps)

== Mammals ==
=== Bats ===
- The Devil Bat (1940; mutant bats)
- Nightwing (1979; vampire bats)
- Bats (1999; genetically altered bats)

=== Bears ===
- Grizzly (1976; a grizzly bear)
- Prophecy (1979; a mutant bear)
- Grizzly Rage (2007; a grizzly bear)
- Grizzly Park (2008; a grizzly bear)
- Bear (2010; a grizzly bear)
- Backcountry (2014; a black bear)
- Into the Grizzly Maze (2015; a grizzly bear)
- Cocaine Bear (2023; a cocaine-ingested black bear)

=== Canines ===
- Dogs (1977; domestic dogs turned into killers)
- The Pack (1977; feral dogs)
- Cujo (1983; a Saint Bernard infected with rabies)
- The Breed (2006; mutated feral dogs)
- Frozen (2010; gray wolves)
- The Grey (2011; gray wolves)
- The Pack (2015; feral dogs)

=== Dolphins ===
- Orca (1977; a killer whale)

=== Felines ===
- Black Zoo (1963; lions and tigers)
- Maneater (2007; a Bengal tiger)
- Burning Bright (2010; a tiger)

=== Pigs ===
- Pigs (1973)
- Razorback (1984; a huge wild boar)
- Pig Hunt (2008; a boar)

=== Primates ===
- Monkey Shines (1988)
- Shakma (1990)
- Blood Monkey (2007)
- Primate (2025)

=== Rats ===
- Willard (1971)
- Ben (1972)
- Deadly Eyes (1982)
- Graveyard Shift (1990)
- Willard (2003)

=== Others ===
- Night of the Lepus (1972; giant rabbits)
- Black Sheep (2006; genetically engineered killer sheep)

== Mollusks ==
=== Gastropods ===
- Slugs (1988; abnormally large killer black slugs)

=== Octopodes and squids ===
- Bride of the Monster (1955; a killer octopus)
- Tentacles (1977; a giant octopus)
- Octopus (2000; a giant octopus)

== Plants ==
- The Little Shop of Horrors (1960; a mutant Venus flytrap)
- The Day of the Triffids (1962; man-eating plants)
- Attack of the Killer Tomatoes (1978; killer tomatoes)
- The Ruins (2008; vines)

== Reptiles ==
=== Alligators and crocodiles ===
- The Great Alligator River (1979; an alligator god)
- Alligator (1980; an abnormally large American alligator)
  - Alligator II: The Mutation (1991; a mutant alligator)
- Dark Age (1986; a monstrous crocodile god called Numunwari)
- Killer Crocodile (1989; mutated large crocodile)
- Lake Placid (1999; an abnormally large saltwater crocodile)
  - Lake Placid 2 (2007)
  - Lake Placid 3 (2010)
  - Lake Placid: The Final Chapter (2012)
- Crocodile (2000; an abnormally large Nile crocodile)
- Blood Surf (2001; a monstrous giant crocodile)
- Black Water (2007; a saltwater crocodile)
- Croc (2007; a saltwater crocodile)
- Primeval (2007; Gustave)
- Rogue (2007; a giant saltwater crocodile)
- Crawl (2019; several American alligators)

=== Snakes ===
- Rattlers (1976)
- Anaconda (1997)
  - Anacondas: The Hunt for the Blood Orchid (2004)
  - Anaconda 3: Offspring (2008)
  - Anacondas: Trail of Blood (2009)
- King Cobra (1999)
- Silent Predators (1999; rattlesnakes)
- Snakes on a Plane (2006)
- Mega Snake (2007)

== Worms ==
- Attack of the Giant Leeches (1959; giant leeches)
- Squirm (1976; bloodworms and sandworms)
- Blood Beach (1982; a giant worm)

== Miscellaneous ==
- Godzilla (1954; a giant irradiated Godzillasaurus)
- Frogs (1972; various species of animals)
- The Food of the Gods (1976; various species of animals)
- Day of the Animals (1977; various species of animals)

== See also ==
- List of disaster films
- List of eco-horror films
- List of films featuring giant monsters
