= Hurricane Ryu =

Japanese illustrator (born 1958)

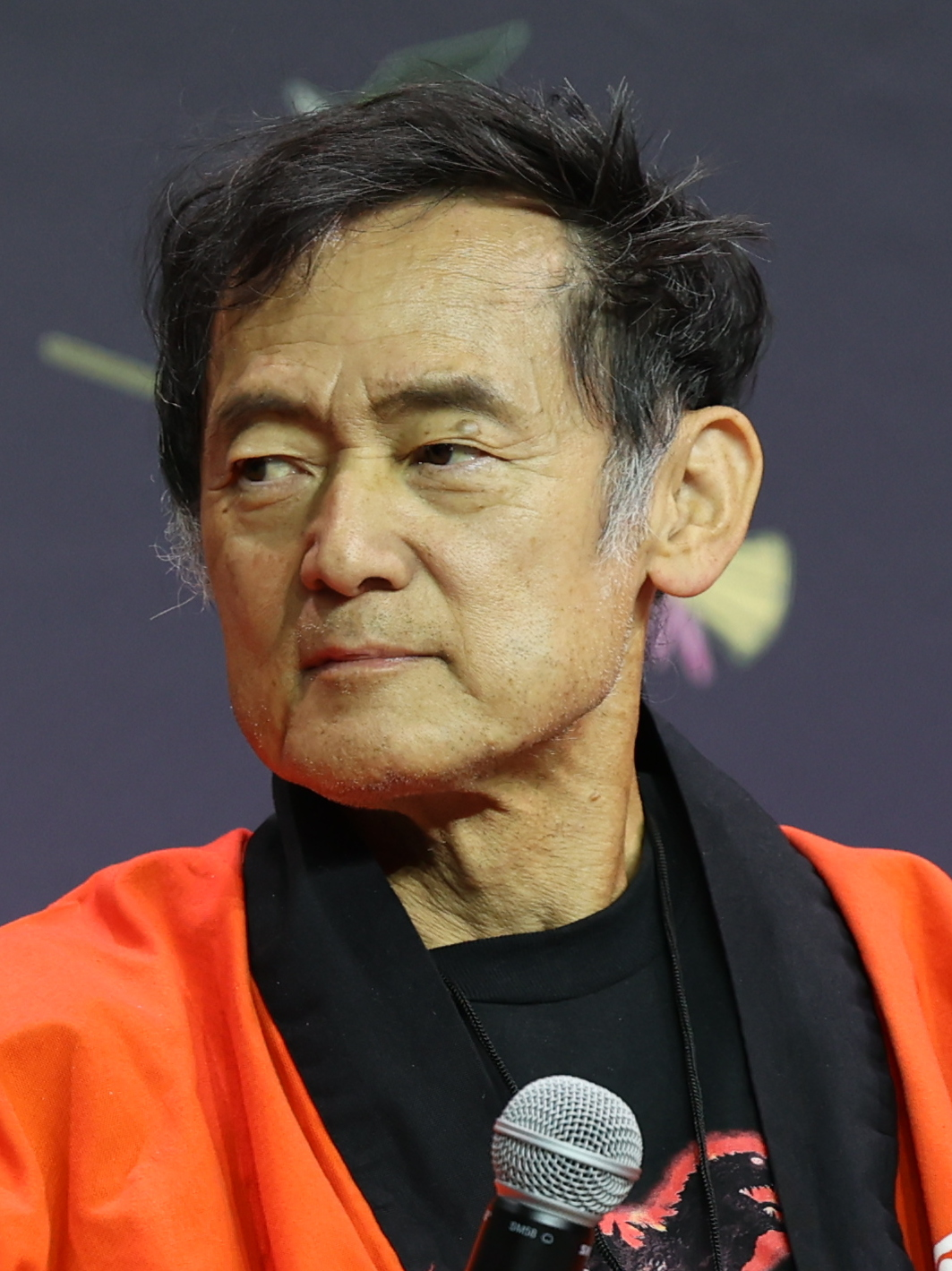
- Ryu in 2024
- Born: Hidemi Miyata; 22 January 1958 (age 67); Tochigi Prefecture, Japan
- Occupations: Illustrator, writer, manga artist, director, martial artist, and actor

Ryu Hariken (破李拳 竜, Hariken Ryū; born January 22, 1958), nicknamed Hurricane Ryu, is a Japanese illustrator, writer, manga artist, director, martial artist, and actor. His real name is Hidemi Miyata (宮田 英実, Miyata Hidemi), born in Tochigi Prefecture.

== Comics ==
- 1980 – Parabola of Ecstasy, Comic DUMP #10, Daya Publishing
- 1982 – Mad City 16 Beat, oneshot, Comic Lemon People #1, 1982
- 1983 – Gekisatsu! Uchuuken, Comic Lemon People #2–#81, Kubo shoten
- 1985 – Blade of Gigantis, Tokyo III Co., Ltd
- 1986 – Pretty Executor, Tokyo III Co., Ltd
- 1990 – Monster Warrior Godzilla, published in JICC publishing's The Godzilla Comic
- 1994 – Giant Monster Gamera, Gekkan Manga Boys, November 1994 – February 1995, Tokuma Shoten.

== Books ==
- 1992 – Godzilla Monster Super Quiz, Kubo shoten
- 1995 – Gojira Road, Fujinsha
- 1996 – Kaijū baka ichi-dai Gojira yakusha e no michi, Yosensha
- 1999 – Men Who Suitacted Tokusatsu Heroes, Sony Magazine

== Filmography ==
=== As a director ===
- 1987 – Pretty Executor
- 1996 – Insatsu seyo! Kyōshinman
- 2013 – P Man: Syborg Bishoujo Shirei Kyakuchū
- 2014 – Heroine Champion Festival
- 2016 – Digital Q-ko VS Robocon Great Battle

=== As an actor ===
- 1991 – Mikadroid (Mikadroid)
- Godzilla film series
  - 1991 – Godzilla vs. King Ghidorah (King Ghidorah and Mecha-King Ghidorah)
  - 1992 – Godzilla vs. Mothra (Battra larva)
  - 1993 – Godzilla vs. Mechagodzilla II (Baby Godzilla)
  - 1995 – Godzilla vs. Destoroyah (Godzilla Junior)
- 1992 – UFO Daisakusen Iko-chan Fight (Miracle Man)
- Den Ace series
  - 1992 – Den Ace ni Shisu (Den Ace)
  - 2005 – Ganso Den Ace (Den Ace)
  - 2007 – Den Ace: The Final (Kirakuki ni Ikiyou)
  - 2017 – Moeru Yo Den Ace (Hideumi Miyata)
  - 2018 – Den Ace 60 (Hideumi Miyata)
  - 2019 – Den Ace Kick (Hideumi Miyata)
  - 2019 – Den Ace Wedding (version of Den Ace Kick with revised ending) (Hideumi Miyata)
- 1994 – Orochi, the Eight-Headed Dragon (Kumasogami)
- 2003 – Marumi☆Mix Juice (Mister Z)
- 2004 – The Calamari Wrestler (Ika Wrestler)
- 2006 – Crab Goalkeeper (Grab Goalkeeper)
- 2006 – The World Sinks Except Japan (Den Ace)
- 2008 – Monster X Strikes Back: Attack the G8 Summit (Guilala)
- 2014 – Earth Defence Widow (Bemuras)
- 2016 – Kaiju Mono
- 2020 – Monster Seafood Wars

== Videography ==
=== As an actor ===
- 1991 – Cosplay Warrior Cutie Knight (Gamera)
