= Japanorama =

- Title card of Japanorama
- Created by: Hotsauce TV
- Written by: Jack Barth
- Directed by: Peter Boyd Maclean
- Starring: Jonathan Ross
- Country of origin: United Kingdom
- Original language: English
- No. of series: 3
- No. of episodes: 18

Production
- Running time: 30 minutes

Original release
- Network: BBC Choice; BBC Three; UKTV
- Release: 9 June 2002 – 23 April 2007

Japanorama is a series of documentaries presented by Jonathan Ross, exploring various facets of popular culture and trends of modern-day Japan.

Each episode has a theme, around which Ross presents cultural phenomenon, films, music, and art that exemplify facets of Japan. The series is colourful in both its creative use of subject matter, and its use of bright colours that helped accent the action on screen rather than distract from it. Subjects are separated by eye catches that often featured the artwork of Junko Mizuno. Ross hosts each episode in bright, eye-catching suits.

Fans have praised the series for the care that both Ross and the BBC have placed in its production. Time was given to delve into each subject, and he was able to interview various figureheads of culture and industry, including Mamoru Oshii, Hayao Miyazaki, Takeshi Kitano, Takashi Miike, Takashi Murakami, and Sonny Chiba.

The theme song of the show was Kiyoshi no zundoko bushi by Kiyoshi Hikawa.

== Series and episode list ==
Japanorama consisted of three series, each with six episodes. The first series was shown on BBC Choice in 2002, while series 2 and 3 were shown on BBC Three in 2006 and 2007 respectively.

=== Series 1 ===
Title	Episode	First aired
Science Fiction	1	9 June 2002
Segments include:	Oshii at Lucca Comics & Games in 2015 TV: Ultraman and interview with director Kazuho Mitsuta; Film: Tetsuo: The Iron Man (1988), Tetsuo II: Body Hammer (1992) and interview with director Shinya Tsukamoto; Video games: Rez (2001), Space Channel 5: Part 2 (2002) and interview with Tetsuya Mizuguchi (CEO of United Game Artists); Etiquette: How to enter a room Anime: Astro Boy (1963), and Akira (1988); Film: Ghost in the Shell, Avalon and interview with director Mamoru Oshii; Culture: Robot pets and robot people Film: I.K.U. (2001), sci-fi porn feature inspired by Blade Runner	
Youth	2	16 June 2002
Segments include:	Hideaki Anno with Ryūsuke Hikawa. (30 October 2014) Film: Waterboys (2001), a high school comedy film about five boys who start a synchronized swimming team. Conceptual Art: Cupheads; Etiquette: How to laugh Music: J-Pop Idols (Hikaru Utada - "Traveling", Aya Matsuura - "Momoiro Kataomoi", Morning Musume - "Sōda! We're Alive", Licca - "Get Back") (Note: from album Deep River, T.W.O, 4th Ikimashoi! and GRADUATION, respectively.); Film: Love and Pop (1998) and interview with director Hideaki Anno; Video games: Super Mario, Resident Evil, (Note: the Remake version of Resident Evil was not released in Europe (including United Kingdom where Japanorama was originally aired) until Friday the 13th of September 2002.) Doko Demo Issyo, Jet Set Radio Future, (Note: released as a launch title for Xbox in Europe, alongside Halo: Combat Evolved.) Otostaz; Culture: "PostPet", this is how internet was meant to be Interview: Hayao Miyazaki, director of many Japan's most popular animated films, such as My Neighbor Totoro (1988), Kiki's Delivery Service (1989), Princess Mononoke (1997), and Spirited Away (2001); Film: Battle Royale (2000): a group of teenagers on an island are forced to kill each other (Note: Since its release, Battle Royale has had an influence on The Hunger Games trilogy, and many battle royale video games. as well as parody, such as Tokyo 10+01 and Mecha-Mecha Iketeru! Mecha-Ike Owarai Battle Royale.)	
Sex	3	23 June 2002
Segments include:	Film: Warm Water Under a Red Bridge (2001), a Shōhei Imamura last feature film. TV: The Paradise TV network, a 24-hour erotic TV channel. Film: In the Realm of the Senses (1976); Film: A Woman Called Sada Abe (1975) and interview with Noboru Tanaka; Interview: The "Kings of Pink" - Serious adult film makers Etiquette: Chopsticks; Anime: Looks at sex in various anime Anime: Legend of the Overfiend (1989); Culture: Figure, erotic cosplay with masks Film: Tokyo Decadence (1992), about a SM girl for hire	
Crime	4	30 June 2002
Segments include:	Kitano at the Cannes Film Festival in 2000. Film: Tokyo Drifter (1966); Film: Branded to Kill (1967); Film: Brother (2000), interview with actor and director Takeshi Kitano; Etiquette: How to exchange business cards Interview: Director Takashi Miike – Audition (1999), City of Lost Souls (2000), Ichi the Killer (2001); Reality TV: "Crybaby". Which girl can produce the most tears? Interview with producer and winner Music: Pizzicato Five, interview with Yasuharu Konishi; Anime: Defining the difference between anime and cartoons with The Professional: Golgo 13 (1983)	
Swords	5	6 July 2002
Segments include:	Koike at New York Comic Con, 2013 Manga: Lone Wolf and Cub, Interview with writer Kazuo Koike; Etiquette: How to bow Film: Zatoichi Meets the One Armed Swordsman (1971); Film: Samurai Fiction (1998), interview with director Nakano Hiroyuki; Anime: Ninja Scroll; Conceptual Art: Breadman; Film: Onibaba (1964); Culture: Kano Sisters, celebrities known for nothing in particular Music: SUPERCAR, WHITE SURF style 5 (2000). Film: Seven Samurai (1954), Yojimbo (1961), hosts from Akira.	
Horror	6	13 July 2002
Segments include:	Interview: Architects and Godzilla actors Etiquette: Numbers; Film: Kwaidan (1964); Film: Scarecrow (2001); Film: St.John's Wort (2001); Film: Ring (1998) and Ring 2, interview with director Hideo Nakata; Anime: Barefoot Gen (1983), interview with writer Keiji Nakazawa; Interview: Junko Mizuno; Interview: Dir En Grey and fans	

=== Series 2 ===
Title	Episode	First aired
Kakkoii (Cool)	1	7 September 2006
Segments include:	Asano at the world premiere of Thor, 2011 Architecture: Buildings in Omotesandō, Tokyo. Interview: Pop and video artist Nagi Noda, creator of the Hanpanda. Custom: Slurping when eating noodles. Interview: Nigo, creator of A Bathing Ape. Interview: Tadanobu Asano. Technology: Robots, such as ASIMO, and an interview with robot builder Tatsuya Matsui.	
Otaku (Nerd Culture)	2	14 September 2006
Segments include:	Akimoto in 2012 Culture: Akihabara; Film: Densha Otoko; Interview: Toru Honda, "King of Otaku"; Culture: Garage kits and other anime model kits, as well as Wonder festival, an annual event dedicated to these things Culture: Moe; Culture: Cosplay; Culture: Maid cafés Custom: Lying and the Japanese saying that doing so would cause you to lose your tongue in the afterlife Music: AKB48, Interview with Akimoto Yasushi	
Zoku (Tribes)	3	21 September 2006
Segments include:	Paul Smith Culture: Harajuku, Tokyo and the subcultures who go there to show off – Gothic Lolitas, gyaru, rockabillys and the like. Music: Junko, dancehall queen. Custom: On graduation day, girls ask the boy they like for their second uniform button – the one closest to his heart. Interview: Paul Smith; Culture: Yakuza and their style in clothes and tattoos.	
Owarai (Comedy)	4	28 September 2006
Segments include:	Culture: Manzai, stand-up comedy Interview: TV comedian Hard Gay; TV: Oh! Mikey, TV comedy sketches Film: Cop in a Wig; Anime: Cromartie High School; Film: The Glamorous Life of Sachiko Hanai	
Bushido (Samurai Spirit)	5	5 October 2006
Segments include:	Minoru Kawasaki Culture: Beetle sumo Interview: Director Minoru Kawasaki about his films Calamari Wrestler, Executive Koala and Crab Goalkeeper; Technology: Sumo robots controlled by cell phones via Bluetooth; Film: The films with Chiaki Kuriyama	
Kawaii (Cute)	6	12 October 2006
Segments include:	Culture: Hello Kitty. Music: Ichirou Mizuki, King of the Anime Singers. Custom: The tradition to throw a fallen-out bottom tooth over your house to symbolise the new tooth growing straight up quickly. Upper teeth should be thrown under the house. TV: Ga-Ra-Ku-Ta: Mr. Stain on Junk Alley and Funny Pets by Ryuji Masuda. Culture: Gloomy Bear and an interview with its creator, Mori Chack. Culture: Japanese dolls, in particular the Super Dollfie dolls.	

=== Series 3 ===
Title	Episode	First aired
Gaijin (Outsiders)	1	19 March 2007
Segments include:	In 2008, as Executive Advisor of ARTA Culture: Bosozoku (bikers); Motorsports: Drift racing, Interview with Keiichi Tsuchiya; Music: Electric Eel Shock hard rock band Culture: Dekotora trucks and their drivers Manga: Afro Samurai, manga and anime series about a black samurai taking revenge Culture: Yayoi Kusama, polka dot artist	
Ai and Koi (Love and Romance)	2	26 March 2007
Segments include:	Religion: Shinto shrines with fertility rites and penis festivals. Culture: Host clubs where women go to meet well-paid male hosts for companionship. There are also onnabe hosts – women dressed as men and taking hormones to grow beards. Culture: Takarazuka Revue, an all-female revue form of theatre. Manga: Yaoi, a genre of manga featuring romance and sex between males. Culture: Air sex, like air guitar but pretend sex instead of guitar play. Culture: Businesses renting rooms with latex love dolls to men.	
J-Art (Japanese Pop Art)	3	2 April 2007
Segments include:	Culture: Takashi Murakami's "Superflat" style of subversive characters derived from Manga and Anime, turned into merchandise Culture: Gesai #10, Tokyo fair for young artists, 2006; Culture: Toast Girl uses household items for performance art Culture: Yoshitomo Nara and his paintings with dark childlike figures Culture: Toy-art, collectible figures created in limited editions Culture: Tomohiro Yasui creates paper figures of wrestling robots Culture: Hard Gay's paintings and sculpture, showing a giant anus Culture: Keiichi Tanaami has created colorful psychedelic art since the late 1960s.	
Densetsu (Legends)	4	9 April 2007
Segments include:	Sonny Chiba 29 October 2005 TV: Celebrating the fortieth anniversary of the Ultraman series Anime: Gundam, Pokémon, Astro Boy; Culture: Illusionist Princess Tenko; Song: Haruka and Rena perform "Tarako, Tarako, Tarako"; Food: Ramen, noodles in broth with toppings Interview: Martial arts actor Sonny Chiba, about his film The Street Fighter and his acting in Kill Bill	
Kaidan (Scary Stories)	5	16 April 2007
Segments include:	Culture: kimodameshi (scary walks for children); Entertainment: "Haunted Hospital" in Fuji-Q Highland, one of the scariest haunted houses, with live actors Anime: Spirited Away (Oscar, 2001), Pom Poko (1994); Culture: Obake, transforming monsters in Japanese folklore, including Kaminari, Bake Chochin and Karakasa Obake (one-legged umbrella); Music: Interview with Demon Kogure, head of a religious heavy metal band who claims to have conquered Earth in 1999; Film: J-Horror films including Kwaidan (1964) with "The Woman of the Snow" and "Hoichi the Earless"; Kuroneko (1968) by Kaneto Shindo; Ring Trilogy (1998-2000) by Hideo Nakata and Norio Tsuruta; (Note: including Ring (1998), Ring 2 (1999) and Ring 0: Birthday (2000).) Ju-on: The Grudge (2003) by Takashi Shimizu; Manga: Interview with Junji Ito, creator of Uzumaki, Tomie and Gyo; Photography: Kaoru Izima takes pictures of fashion models as if they were dead Film: Ero guro ("erotic grotesque") movies, many based on the horror novels by Rampo Edogawa, e.g. Japanese Hell (1999) and Blind Beast vs. Dwarf (2001) by Teruo Ishii and Sexual Parasite: Killer Pussy (2004) by Takao Nakano	
Gyaru (Bad girls)	6	23 April 2007
Segments include:	Culture: Kogals, Ganguro and Yamanba girls. Dance: Para Para, synchronised group dancing performed to eurobeat music. Interview: Maeda Ken, para para pop star behind the Maeken Trance Project. Film: Azumi (2003). Feature: Entertainer Reiko Ike, best known for her action/erotic roles in so-called "pink films". Film: Kamikaze Girls (2004), Sakuran (2007) and interview with actress and pop idol Anna Tsuchiya. Culture: Female wrestling. Music: Female pop stars Namie Amuro, Ayumi Hamasaki and Kumi Koda. All-female bands Metal Chicks, The Feminine and eX-Girl.	

== See also ==
- Japan TV, a similar programme by BBC Choice, broadcast in August 2000 and June 2001
- Adam and Joe Go Tokyo, an eight-part 2003 series examining life in Tokyo, produced by Jonathan Ross
- Asian Invasion, a 2006 mini-series with Jonathan Ross talking about the cinema of Japan, Hong Kong and Korea
