= Crab Goalkeeper =

- Directed by: Minoru Kawasaki
- Release date: May 27, 2006
- Running time: 92 minutes
- Country: Japan
- Language: Japanese

Crab Goalkeeper (かにゴールキーパー, Kani Goalkeeper) is a 2006 Japanese monster and sports comedy directed by Minoru Kawasaki and starring Hiroshi Fujioka and Naoto Takenaka. The film portrays an oversized crab who plays as a football goal keeper. Kawasaki described it as being "like Forrest Gump, but with a crab."

The film was featured on the BBC documentary 'Japanorama' (episode of 5 October 2006)

== Plot ==
Members of a Japanese football team decide to hire a giant crab to play as goalkeeper.

== Cast ==
- Hiroshi Fujioka
- Arthur Kiroda

== Background ==
Alongside with two other films, The Calamari Wrestler and Monster Seafood War. Crab Goalkeeper has been noted as an example of one of Kawasaki's signature subgenres: "Sea Life Sports films". More generally, Kawasaki makes an extensive use of anthropomorphic animal creatures in his films, as in Kabuto-O Beetle or in Executive Koala. Crab Goalkeeper is also considered part of "the voluntary kitsch apparent in Kawasaki's crazy productions".

== Reception ==
The film was described as "another attempt at dealing with bizarre topics" in Kawasaki's career. Another review, calling the film a "mysterious work", found in this "series of emotional episodes provoking laughter and tears" an exploration of the way an animal can change through their contact with humans.
