= Hiroshi Fujioka =

Japanese actor (born 1946)

- Born: Kunihiro Fujioka; February 19, 1946 (age 80); Kuma, Ehime, Japan
- Occupations: Actor, television personality, martial artist, voice actor, singer, explorer
- Years active: 1965–present
- Spouse: Keiko Torii (1987–1990)
- Website: www.samurai-hiroshi.com/index.html

Kunihiro Fujioka (藤岡 邦弘, Fujioka Kunihiro; born February 19, 1946 in Kuma, Ehime (now Kumakōgen, Ehime)), better known by his stage name Hiroshi Fujioka, (藤岡 弘、, Fujioka Hiroshi,), is a Japanese actor.

== Career ==
He is known for playing the hero Takeshi Hongo (ja) in the tokusatsu superhero series Kamen Rider, and later the Sega Saturn mascot Segata Sanshiro.

Fujioka is a cultural icon in Japan, even having had the minor planet 12408 Fujioka, which was discovered by Akimasa Nakamura, named in his honor. Fujioka writes his name with the ideographic comma at the end (after the kanji for "Hiroshi" (弘)), saying "It is meant to remind me to reconsider myself and what it is that I need to achieve. It shows that I am not yet finished with my tasks and must continue working toward their accomplishment."

Hiroshi's son, Maito, serves as the current ambassador of Sega as of March 26, 2020, portraying as Segata Sanshiro's son Sega Shiro, as well as Takeshi Hongo's younger-self as of 2021, starting from Kamen Rider: Beyond Generations.

== Filmography ==
=== Live-action ===
- Takeshi Hongo/Kamen Rider 1 (ja)

- Kamen Rider (1971-1973) (episodes 1-10, 40-41, 49, 51-65, 68-98)
- Kamen Rider Vs. Shocker (1972) - Movie
- Kamen Rider Vs. Hell Ambassador (1972) - Movie
- Kamen Rider V3 (1973) (episodes 1, 2, 21, 33, 34)
- Kamen Rider V3 Vs. Destron Mutants (1973) - Movie (Voice)
- Kamen Rider X: Five Riders Vs. King Dark (1974) - Movie (Voice)
- Kamen Rider Stronger (1975) (episodes 38, 39)
- All Together! Seven Kamen Riders!! (1976) - Special
- OOO, Den-O, All Riders: Let's Go Kamen Riders (2011) - Movie (voice)
- Heisei Riders vs. Shōwa Riders: Kamen Rider Taisen feat. Super Sentai (2014) - Movie
- Kamen Rider 1 (2016) - Movie (also writer alongside Toshiki Inoue)
- Saber + Zenkaiger: Super Hero Senki (2021) - Movie

- Thai movies

- Jumborg Ace & Giant (1974) as Yak Wat Jaeng

- Taiga drama

- Katsu Kaishū (1974) as Sakamoto Ryōma
- Kusa Moeru (1979) as Miura Yoshimura
- Onna Taikoki (1981) as Oda Nobunaga
- Spring Waves (1985) as Takeshi Okuhira
- Kasuga no Tsubone (1989) as Oda Nobunaga
- Hana no Ran (1994) as Ōuchi Masahiro
- Sanada Maru (2016) as Honda Tadakatsu
- What Will You Do, Ieyasu? (2023) as Oda Nobuhide

- Camellia is the Flower of Love (1965) as Takeru
- Wakai Shibuki (1965) as Keiichi Natsukawa
- Blood and Law (1965) as Yūichi Machida
- Law of the Wild (1965) as Tsutomu
- After the Dance, the Goodbye (1965) as Ryūichi Ikehara
- High-Ranking Yakuza (1965) as Hayakawa
- High-Ranking Yakuza Returns: A Man's Rage (1965) as Ryōta
- The X from Outer Space (1967) as Moon base worker
- Under the Stars of Singapore (1967) as Dòng
- Barren Loveja (1967) as Hiroyuki Kitamura
- Rebellion of Japan (1967) as Kosaburō
- Till the Day We Meet Again: Spring of Lovers (1967) as Noboru Fujiura
- Little Snack (1968) as Akira Mitsuhashi
- Declaration of First Love (1968) as Matsuoka
- Konto 55-gō and Suizenji Kiyoko's Lover of the God (1968) as Junichi Iwano
- Fallen Leaves and Sweet Memories (1969) as Jun
- Konto 55-gō and Suizenji Kiyoko's One Two Punch: March of 365 Steps (1969) as Junkichi Taniguchi
- Chinchin 55-gō buttobase! Shuppatsu shinkō (1969) as The young man with a helmet
- The Sunset is Calling Me (1970) as Shuji Sagara
- Chiba Shusaku Kendo Straight Ahead (1970-1971)
- I want to forget (1972-1973) as Tetsuji
- Gold Eye (1970) as Hiroshi "Fuji"
- Wandering Wolf: Ryu the Branded Cross (1972)
- Submersion of Japan (1973) as Onodera Toshio
- Beast Hunting (1973) as Akira Funaki
- The Beast Shall Die (1974) as Kunihiko Date
- ESPY (1974) as Yoshio Tamura
- Conflagration (1975) as Kanjirō
- Uchi no Honkan (1975)
- Samurai! (1976) as Saburō Sakai
- Incadescent Flame (1977) as Chief Inspector Kitahara
- Tokusō Saizensen (1977–1987) as Tetsuo Sakurai
- The Zukkoke Trio (1985) as Hiraga Gennai
  - New The Zukkoke Trio (2002) as Inspector Otoha
- Ghost Warrior a.k.a. SF Swordkill (1984) as Yoshimitsu Taga
- The Super Cops (1988) as Hiroshi Fujioka
- K2 (1992) as Takane Shimuzu
- About love Tokyo (1993) as Endō
- Gotoshi Co. Ltd. (1993) as Sugawara
- Orochi, the Eight-Headed Dragon (1994) as Kumaso Takeru
- La Vie Coexistence ! (1995) as Kiyoshi
- Voicelugger (1999) as Hiroshi
- Shogun Cop (1999) as Sanada
- Asuka (1999-2000) as Tarō Miyamoto
- Sakuya Yōkaiden (2000) as Sakaki Bizen-no-kami Yoshiaki
- Shusaku's Odyssey (2000) as Chūbē Nakanishi
- Kamen Rider Agito: Project G4 (2001) - Movie (MBT Superintendent General, cameo)
- Kabachitare (2001) as The pleasant rider
- Kinpachi-sensei (2001) as Tsurumoto Yusuke
- Home Sweet Home 2: The Way Sun Parasol Came (2003) as Tetsuan
- The All-Out Nine: Field of Nightmares a.k.a. Nine in Adversity (2005) as Principal
- Fantastipo (2005) as Yoshirō Takeda
- Koimachi Monogatari (2005)
- Crab Goalkeeper (2006) as Fujimura
- Love Tomato (2006) as Yūsaku
- Nihon Igai Zenbu Chinbotsu (2006) as Ishiyama Shinsaboro
- I am Japanese (2006) as George
- Ten Nights of Dream (2007) as Natsume Sōseki
- Tomica Hero: Rescue Force Explosive Movie: Rescue the Mach Train! (2008) as Reiji Osakabe
- The Story of Shotaro Ishinomori, The Man Who Created Heroes (2018) as Hiroshi Fujioka
- Daughter of Lupin (2019–20) as Waichi Sakuraba (special appearance)
  - Daughter of Lupin the Movie (2021) as Waichi Sakuraba (special appearance)
- Ginji the Speculator (2022)

=== Video games ===
- Kamen Rider: Battride War Genesis (2016) as Takeshi Hongo/Kamen Rider 1
- Project X Zone 2 (2015) as Segata Sanshiro
- Final Fantasy VII Rebirth (2024) as Zangan

=== Dubbing ===
- The Big Boss (1978) as Cheng Chao-an (Bruce Lee)
- Ultraman: Towards the Future (1990) as Narrator
- Mulan (1998) as Shan Yu

== Voice-over roles ==
- Segata Sanshirō Shinken Yūgi (1998) as Segata Sanshirō
- Shenmue (1999) as Iwao Hazuki
- Kamen Rider V3 (2000) as Takeshi Hongo/Kamen Rider 1
- Shenmue II (2001) as Iwao Hazuki
- Arcade Gamer Fubuki (2002–2003) as Leader
- Kamen Rider: Genealogy of Justice (2003) as Takeshi Hongo/Kamen Rider 1 (ja)
- Crayon Shin-chan: Nohara Hiroshi expedition I saw a secretary-only village in an unexplored region! (2003) as Hiroshi Fujioka
- Kingdom Hearts II (2005) as Shan Yu
- Last Order -Final Fantasy VII- (2005) as Zangan
- Pokémon Ranger and the Prince of the Sea: Manaphy (2006) as Phantom
- Fist of the North Star Zero: Legend of Kenshiro (2008) as Narrator
