= Planet Prince =

- Theatrical release poster

Japanese name
- Kanji: 遊星王子
Transcriptions
- Revised Hepburn: Yūsei Ōji
- Directed by: Eijirō Wakabayashi
- Screenplay by: Shin Morita
- Story by: Masaru Igami
- Produced by: Walter Manley, Toei Company
- Starring: Tatsuo Umemiya; Joji Oda; Hiroko Mine
- Cinematography: Masahiko Iimura
- Music by: Katsuhisa Hattori
- Distributed by: Toei Company
- Release date: May 19, 1959
- Running time: 57 minutes (Part I); 64 minutes (Part II)
- Country: Japan
- Language: Japanese

Planet Prince (遊星王子, Yūsei Ōji) is a 1958 Japanese tokusatsu superhero television series created by Masaru Igami and produced by Senkosha, the series aired on NTV from November 4, 1958 to October 6, 1959, with a total of 49 episodes (comprising four separate adventures). It was created to capitalize on the success of Shintoho's Super Giant (Starman) movie series. In fact, the title hero (whose alter-ego was Waku-san, played by Toshio Mimura) bore a strong resemblance to Super Giant (known as "Starman" in the U.S.). The pair of Planet Prince theatrical featurettes, adapted from the Senkosha TV series, were produced by Toei Studios and filmed in black and white ToeiScope format.

Toei produced two theatrical movies in 1959 that featured the Planet Prince character, but wearing a completely different, more streamlined costume (and goggled helmet) than the one worn in the tv series. The hero in these two movies was played by Tatsuo Umemiya. The movies were released a week apart. The films were titled:

- Planet Prince (遊星王子, Yūsei Ōji) Released: May 19, 1959
- Planet Prince - The Terrifying Spaceship (遊星王子 - 恐怖の宇宙船, Yūsei Ōji - Kyōfu no Uchūsen) Released: May 25, 1959

For TV release in America, these two Planet Prince movies were compiled into an 85-minute, English-dubbed movie entitled Prince of Space that was first shown in 1965.

== Production ==
The TV version looks very similar to Super Giant (Starman), in that both wear cowled costumes and capes. Each character also has superpowers and flies. The two-part movie version (produced by Toei) is very different, as Prince of Space wears a more streamlined costume, cape, and helmet with goggles. In the edited US version, he has no superpowers other than the invulnerability of his costume and - in a subplot unique to the Japanese version - the ability to revert a man who was brainwashed by the Ginsei aliens back to a peaceful state. In the films, he uses a wand-like laser gun and flies a small spaceship.

In the TV version, just like Moonlight Mask, the Planet Prince persona was listed in the credits as being played by "?" (even though the character never wore a mask to conceal his face).

In the film, Prince's enemy is called Ambassador Phantom of the Silver Planet (銀星のまぼろし大使) (this villain also appeared in one of the tv series' story arcs), while in the English-language version, the villain is called Dictator Phantom of the Planet Krankor. He (along with his henchmen) wears a large prosthetic nose and cowl that give him a decidedly chicken-like appearance, something that was constantly mocked when the film was featured on Mystery Science Theater 3000, along with audio dubbing that gave him a "laugh like a Buick not turning over" according to series writer Bridget Jones.

== Cast ==
(Americanized names in parentheses)

- Planet Prince/Waku-san (Prince of Space/Wally) - Tatsuo Umemiya
- Ambassador Phantom (Ambassador Dictator Phantom) - Joji Oka
- Sachiko (Susie) - Hiroko Mine
- Dr. Maki (Dr. Macken) - Ushio Akashi
- Ichiro (Johnny) - Akira Asami
- Makoto (Mickey) - Koji Komori
- Kimiko (Kimmy) - Midori Tsuzuki
- Inspector Takeda - Takashi Kanda
- Sawamoto (Dr. Sangamon) - Akira Tatematsu
- Shibasaki - Masahiko Naruse
- Mukai - Ken Sudo
- Newsreporter Tabei (Mr. Tannen) - Ken Hasebe
- Newsreporter Tono (Jerry the Reporter) - Giichi Sugi
- Sakai - Koji Sahara
- Tsunoda - Tokio Kozuka
- Keichi Kawajima (Inspector) - Rin'ichi Yamamoto
- Dr. Naito - Hiroshi Katayama
- Newspaper reporter - Yuji Kitamine
- Phantom's henchmen - Riki Iwaki, Kenji Todoroki, Hiroshi Mihara, Nobuo Yana
- Dr. Tateishi (Dr. Fletcher) - Shusuke Sone
- Mrs. Tateishi - Kaoru Nakano
- Commander Koda - Akikane Sawa
- Secretary of Defense Fukuhara - Shiko Saito
- Captain Munakata - Tadashi Minamikawa
- Colonel Matsuda - Junkichi Orimoto
- Colonel Watanabe - Junji Masuda
- The Guardian - Rinichi Yamamoto
- Kidnapped American scientist (Dr. Cohen) - Osman Yusuf (uncredited)

== Production credits ==
- Planning - Sanehiko Okada
- Director - Eijiro Wakabayashi
- Producer - Sanehiko Sonoda
- Screenplay - Shin Morita
- Original Story - Masaru Igami
- Music - Hirooki Ogawa (stock music; uncredited), Katsuhisa Hattori
- Director of Photography - Masahiko Iimura
- Lighting - Kenzo Ginya
- Art Director - Shuichiro Nakamura
- Recording - Shozo Hirokami
- Film Editor - Yoshiki Nagasawa
- Director of Special Effects - Shozo Horai
- Assistant Director - Hajime Sato
- Production Assistant - Takeshi Nishii

Theme Song – "Planet Prince Song"

- Vocals - Kamitakada Junior Chorus
- Lyrics - Masaru Igami
- Composer - Katsuhisa Hattori

== Reboot ==
In 2021, Minoru Kawasaki directed a feature film reboot of the series, Planet Prince 2021.
