= List of 2006 box office number-one films in Japan =

This is a list of films which have placed number one at the weekend box office in Japan during 2006.

== Number-one films ==
†	This implies the highest-grossing movie of the year.

#	Weekend End Date	Film	Total Weekend Gross	Notes
1	January 1, 2006	Harry Potter and the Goblet of Fire	$11,445,783	
2	January 8, 2006	Otoko-tachi no Yamato	$9,334,091	
3	January 15, 2006	The Uchōten Hotel	$11,756,367	
4	January 22, 2006	Flightplan	$15,667,919	
5	January 29, 2006	The Uchōten Hotel	$12,178,850	
6	February 5, 2006	The Uchōten Hotel	$11,391,971	
7	February 12, 2006	Munich	$1,271,448	
8	February 19, 2006	The Uchōten Hotel	$2,064,713	
9	February 26, 2006	Forbidden Siren	$13,902,173	
10	March 5, 2006	The Chronicles of Narnia: The Lion, the Witch and the Wardrobe	$19,064,852	
11	March 12, 2006	The Chronicles of Narnia: The Lion, the Witch and the Wardrobe	$16,269,316	
12	March 19, 2006	The Chronicles of Narnia: The Lion, the Witch and the Wardrobe	$12,242,394	
13	March 26, 2006	The Chronicles of Narnia: The Lion, the Witch and the Wardrobe	$10,131,801	
14	April 2, 2006	The Chronicles of Narnia: The Lion, the Witch and the Wardrobe	$11,089,430	
15	April 9, 2006	The Chronicles of Narnia: The Lion, the Witch and the Wardrobe	$6,967,179	
16	April 16, 2006	Detective Conan: The Private Eye's Requiem	$13,249,896	
17	April 23, 2006	Detective Conan: The Private Eye's Requiem	$10,544,636	
18	April 30, 2006	Detective Conan: The Private Eye's Requiem	$10,009,176	
19	May 7, 2006	Limit of Love: Umizaru	$17,938,624	
20	May 14, 2006	Limit of Love: Umizaru	$12,826,246	
21	May 21, 2006	The Da Vinci Code	$20,074,324	
22	May 28, 2006	The Da Vinci Code	$19,370,484	
23	June 4, 2006	The Da Vinci Code	$15,998,437	
24	June 11, 2006	The Da Vinci Code	$15,755,530	
25	June 18, 2006	Death Note	$16,026,737	
26	June 25, 2006	Death Note	$12,730,940	
27	July 2, 2006	Cars	$13,394,878	
28	July 9, 2006	Mission: Impossible III	$17,753,945	
29	July 16, 2006	Nihon Igai Zenbu Chinbotsu	$18,401,267	
30	July 23, 2006	Pirates of the Caribbean: Dead Man's Chest	$28,718,560	
31	July 30, 2006	Tales from Earthsea †	$22,244,951	
32	August 6, 2006	Tales from Earthsea †	$18,329,749	
33	August 13, 2006	Pirates of the Caribbean: Dead Man's Chest	$17,524,925	
34	August 20, 2006	Superman Returns	$15,418,008	
35	August 27, 2006	Tales from Earthsea †	$11,670,140	
36	September 3, 2006	Miami Vice	$9,806,877	
37	September 10, 2006	X-Men: The Last Stand	$8,967,132	
38	September 17, 2006	The Fast and the Furious: Tokyo Drift	$10,674,273	
39	September 24, 2006	The Lake House	$8,289,150	
40	October 1, 2006	Nada so so	$9,762,445	
41	October 8, 2006	World Trade Center	$9,820,646	
42	October 15, 2006	World Trade Center	$7,746,502	
43	October 22, 2006	Nada so so	$7,162,688	
44	October 29, 2006	Kisarazu Cat's Eye	$9,317,220	
45	November 5, 2006	Death Note 2: The Last Name	$13,747,043	
46	November 12, 2006	Death Note 2: The Last Name	$10,394,163	
47	November 19, 2006	Death Note 2: The Last Name	$10,517,980	
48	November 26, 2006	The Devil Wears Prada	$8,009,899	
49	December 3, 2006	Love and Honor	$10,169,017	
50	December 10, 2006	Letters from Iwo Jima	$13,698,930	
51	December 17, 2006	Letters from Iwo Jima	$15,079,177	
52	December 24, 2006	Letters from Iwo Jima	$12,935,476	
53	December 31, 2006	Letters from Iwo Jima	$6,865,760	
