= Monster X Strikes Back: Attack the G8 Summit =

- Theatrical release poster
- Directed by: Minoru Kawasaki
- Written by: Minoru Kawasaki; Masakazu Migita
- Based on: The X from Outer Space
- Produced by: Shinobu Suzuki; Minoru Kawasaki; Shuntaro Kanai; Masanobu Suzuki; Koichi Shioda
- Starring: Natsuki Katō; Kazuki Kato; Takeshi Kitano; Susumu Kurobe; Masami Horiuchi; Bin Furuya; Eiichi Kikuchi; Hurricane Ryu
- Cinematography: Takashi Suga
- Edited by: Yosuke Yafune
- Music by: Yasuhiko Fukuda
- Distributed by: Shochiku
- Release date: July 5, 2008 (Hokkaido)
- Running time: 98 minutes
- Language: Japanese

Monster X Strikes Back: Attack the G8 Summit (Japanese: ギララの逆襲／洞爺湖サミット危機一発 Girara no Gyakushū: Tōyako Samitto Kiki Ippatsu lit. 'Guilala's Counterattack: Lake Toya Summit Crisis') is a 2008 Japanese kaiju comedy film, released by Shochiku and produced by the Guilala Production Committee. The film makes use of stock footage from the 1967 film The X from Outer Space.

== Plot ==
Several world leaders meet together at the 2008 G8 Summit in Hokkaidō, Japan. A meteorite crashes into the heart of Sapporo and releases the monster Guilala. The monster rampages through Sapporo, leaving death and destruction in his wake. After leveling the city, Guilala transforms into a giant ball of fire and flies across Hokkaidō, making its way to the G8 Summit of world leaders. The Prime Minister of Japan proposes cancelling the summit for the safety of all involved, but the President of the United States convinces the other world leaders to personally stay and fight.

The leaders soon discover the reason for Guilala's appearance on Earth was due to a Chinese satellite that fell out of orbit and was the crashed "meteorite" in Sapporo. Assisting the leaders is Dr. Sano, a Japanese scientist who discovers that Guilala is actually a cosmic spore attached to the probe that was exposed to Earth's atmosphere, causing it to grow into the monster. He also figures out that the crash caused Guilala to lose a lot of energy and it is searching for "high temperature" energy to recharge. The doctor does not think the monster will leave Japan until it finds the energy it needs. Meanwhile, Guilala arrives at the Noboribetsu power plant and sucks all of the energy out of the plant.

Hoping to trap Guilala, the Japanese set up an earthquake generator near Shōwa-shinzan to draw Guilala to a magma flow and destroy him with a super missile known as the Vulture. Guilala arrives to feed, but he swallows the missile whole when it is fired at him. Soon, other countries are scrambling with their own weapons, but each one fails in comedic fashion. In the middle of all this, the Japanese Prime Minister is waylaid by diarrhea and is replaced by Junzaburo Ohizumi, a former Prime Minister and a friend of the U.S. President. He arrives to help in the battle, but seems shifty. Ohizumi even suggests using nuclear weapons, but is stared down by the other leaders.

When Guilala's mind is damaged by a British brainwashing weapon, the monster begins a wild rampage. Ohizumi suddenly reveals that he is in fact the Supreme leader of the "North Country" (North Korea's Kim Jong-Il). He stole Ohizumi's identity during a state visit. He reveals that the Japanese interpreters attending the G8 Summit are all his spies and they all draw weapons, taking the world leaders hostage. He also announces that he plans on using a "limited" nuclear warhead to destroy Guilala. Meanwhile, President Sorkozy [sic] of France clad only in a towel, Sorkozy creates a distraction, which allows Japanese soldiers to rush the spies. The North Country leader is captured but not before managing to launch the nuclear missile at Guilala. Dr. Sano announces that Guilala's spores are re-energized and that if the missile strikes, it will spread Guilala spores worldwide.

Meanwhile, two Japanese journalists named Sumire Sumidagawa and Sanpei Toyama discover a hidden village full of worshipers. They are driven out as outsiders intruding on a sacred ceremony. Shortly afterwards, Guilala lands and begins searching for energy. Sumire and Sanpei are sent to get news on Guilala's rampage. However, their efforts prove unsuccessful, as other news groups are looking for big news on Guilala. During the G8 Summit's efforts to stop Guilala, Sumire encounters a boy she saw at the village's ceremony. Believing that the village might know how to stop Guilala, Sumire and Sanpei return for answers.

They find a carving of Guilala which they also notice is battling another monster. That figure is known as Take-Majin, a deity that the villagers worship. An ancient prophecy predicted that Guilala was going to destroy the world, but he would be stopped by Take-Majin, who would awaken to save mankind from Guilala. The little boy Sumire met earlier worshiped Take-Majin, after his father was killed in a landslide. Concerned with the planet's safety over their own, Sumire and a reluctant Sanpei participate in Take-Majin's awakening ceremony. Just when Take-Majin is about to wake up, the entire village is evacuated by the army when the nuclear missile launched by North Country begins to approach Guilala.

Just in time, Take-Majin suddenly awakens and stops the missile by catching it with his buttocks, allowing it to explode inside his body harmlessly. He then confronts Guilala, preparing for battle. After a long battle, Take-Majin is victorious, decapitating Guilala and saving all humanity as prophesied. Take-Majin then returns into his shrine to sleep once again. The G8 Summit leaders celebrate their victory by taking a bath in a hot spring (despite the Supreme leader of the North Country escaping during the fight).

== Cast ==
- Natsuki Katō as Sumire Sumidagawa
- Kazuki Kato as Sanpei Toyama
- Takeshi Kitano as Take-Majin
- Susumu Kurobe as Officer Kimura
- Masami Horiuchi as Doctor Fukami
- Bin Furuya as Officer Takamine
- Eiichi Kikuchi as Village Mayor Makibashiri
- Hurricane Ryu as Guilala

== Production ==
The film is the first official The X from Outer Space remake to be released, following several scrapped attempts by 1990s.

As a part of promotions, Minoru Kawasaki introduced a specialized episode in his Den Ace series, and the American staffing agency Ladders, Inc. used the kaiju Guilala for a television commercial.

The character "Take-Majin" and his behaviors are based on Takeshi Kitano's previous parodies on Daimajin (Note: Kitano has previously introduced Daimajin parodies in his variety shows such as Tensai Takeshi No Genki Ga Deru Terebi!! and Waratte Pon!.) and Nadia Comăneci, (also as a parody to his raid on Friday) while influences from Gamera and Ultraman franchises can be seen on his heroism and a supporting child.

== Reception ==
When released at G-Fest XVI, the film was well-received because it did not take itself seriously and adopted a satirical approach. However, retrospective reviews were disappointed that many sequences of Guilala in the film used stock footage recycled from The X from Outer Space. The Hollywood Reporter characterized the film as "certainly having little arthouse value, but (...) bound to get people into the cinemas".
