= Planet Prince 2021 =

2021 film directed by Minoru Kawasaki

- Theatrical release poster

Japanese name
- Kanji: 遊星王子2021
Transcriptions
- Revised Hepburn: Yūsei Oji 2021
- Directed by: Minoru Kawasaki
- Screenplay by: Minoru Kawasaki; Akihiko Kikawa
- Story by: Masaru Igami
- Based on: Planet Prince by Toei
- Produced by: Sadayuki Muraoka
- Starring: Sho Higano; Jiro Dan; Eiichi Kikuchi
- Cinematography: Kenji Oka
- Edited by: Yuta Kawasaki
- Music by: Ryo Nakamura
- Production company: Planet Prince 2021 Production Committee
- Distributed by: Pal Planning
- Release date: August 27, 2021
- Country: Japan
- Language: Japanese

Planet Prince 2021 (Japanese: 遊星王子2021, Hepburn: Yūsei Oji 2021) is a 2021 Japanese tokusatsu science fiction superhero film directed by Minoru Kawasaki. It is a reboot of Toei's Planet Prince franchise and the second theatrical film adaptation of the series.

== Premise ==
200 years after his spaceship crashed landed on Earth. Planet Prince awakens from his sleep, rescuing the bakery's daughter Kimiko from a desperate pinch and deciding to stay at the bakery. As the planetary prince explored the earth, he interacted with the residents, occasionally replaced the top idols, and guarded the city from the alien invaders, the Turtans. The impact of the crash, however, caused most of his memory to be wiped out, and he had no idea how to return to the fourth planet. Although he became a hero, the Turtans later revealed that he was the universe's destroyer. Nana Oda, who worked with Sho Hinata on the former "Sakurazaka46", will play the role of the heroine and will play both Prince Planet and Kosuke Funaki.

== Cast ==
- Sho Higano as Planet Prince / Kosuke Funaki
- Nana Oda as Kimiko Omura / Princess Claudia
- Jiro Dan as Planetary King
- Eiichi Kikuchi as Turtanu Royal Family
- Tsukasa Wakabayashi
- Shinzō Hotta
- Satoshi Kobayashi
- Hideto Suzuki
- Taira Yushin
- Mami Hase
- Yakan Nabe
- Eiji Ukulele
- Toshio Kobori
- Shimako Iwai
- Akihide Tsuzawa
- Akari Machi
- Nobuhiro Motohashi
- Takeharu Mikami
- Kon Arimura
- Motoko Obayashi
- Toshiyuki Someya
- Gota Nishidera
- Terumi Yoshida
