= Ultraman (character) =

Japanese superhero

- Ultra Series character
- Ultraman portrayed in his Spacium Ray stance
- First appearance: Ultraman (1966)
- Created by: Eiji Tsuburaya; Tetsuo Kinjo; Kazuho Mitsuta; Akira Sasaki
- Designed by: Tohl Narita
- Portrayed by: Bin Furuya (1966 & 2022); Chūji Saitō (1971); Hideyuki Masuda (1974–75); Shunsuke Gondō (1997); Hiroyuki Inomata (2009); Hideaki Anno (2022)
- Voiced by: Masao Nakasone (grunt and Ep. 33); Hisashi Kondo (Ep. 1 and 39); Kōji Ishizaka (Ultraman Ep. 15); Isao Yatsu (Return); Mahito Tsujimura (Ace); Shinya Nazuka (Leo); Kenyu Horiuchi (1984); Toshiyuki Morikawa (1996); Issei Futamata (Tiga); Susumu Kurobe (2006 - 2013); Takahiro Sakurai (2016 - present); Tsutomu Isobe (motion comic; Bemular); Kaiji Soze (Netflix adaptation; Bemular)
- Motion capture: Kaiji Soze (2019; motion actor)

In-universe information
- Aliases: Ultraman (1966); Original Ultraman; Bemular (2011 manga/2016 anime)
- Species: Ultra
- Gender: Male
- Occupation: Member of the Inter-Galactic Defense Force; Member of the Ultra Brothers
- Affiliation: The Inter-Galactic Defense Force; The Ultra Brothers
- Origin: Nebula M78, the Land of Light (Note: In the 2022 film Shin Ultraman, the character's origin place is known as "Nebula M87, the Star of Light".)

Ultraman (ウルトラマン, Urutoraman) is a Japanese superhero introduced in the eponymous 1966 TV series. He is the first tokusatsu hero launched by the Ultra Series and by Tsuburaya Productions. The character produced the Kyodai Hero genre with shows such as Godman and Iron King.

Following Ultraman's success, Tsuburaya created another Kyodai hero series still as part of their Ultra Series project, Ultraseven. While both series shared the same genre with very similar heroes, there was originally no relationship between the two. It was not until Return of Ultraman was created four years later in 1971 that both Ultraman and Ultra Seven came together into the same story. This event cemented Tsuburaya Productions' decision to have the Ultra Series continue to follow the trend of focusing on an Ultraman with each new entry. The original red-and-silver giant hero himself enjoyed a long series of popularity and has continued to appear in various works in the Ultra Series. Apart from that, he also has a lot of popularity trademarks that make him memorable to this day: his Color Timer, the Spacium Ray stance, and his famous cry "Shuwatch" (シュワッチ, Shuwatchi).

In the series, Ultraman's grunts and his iconic shout "Shuwatch" were provided by Masao Nakasone (中曽根雅夫, Nakasone Masao), who would later voice him as an actual character in episode 33 during his fight with Alien Mefilas. His dialogue in episodes 1 and 39 was provided by Hisashi Kondō (近藤久, Kondō Hisashi) while in episode 15, he was voiced by Koji Ishizaka (石坂 浩二, Ishizaka Kōji), the narrator of episodes 1 to 19. In subsequent appearances, Ultraman reuses Masao's grunt while his voice is provided by Susumu Kurobe (Shin Hayata's actor) or just simply speechless during the screen time. Ultraman's suit actor was Bin Furuya (古谷敏, Furuya Bin) during the original season. He would later go on to portray Ultra Guard member Amagi, one of the characters in the later series, Ultraseven. Ultraman appeared in later works of the Ultra Series played by various voice and suit actors. Although Susumu Kurobe did reprise his role as Hayata or provided the voice of Ultraman himself at times (though his grunts were still reused from the late Masao Nakasone) but there are other occasions where he was voiced by other voice actors.

In Japan, the Ultraman brand generated $7.4 billion in merchandising revenue from 1966 to 1987. Ultraman was the world's third top-selling licensed character in the 1980s, largely due to his popularity in Asia.

== Character conception ==
Ultraman's suit variations in 1966: Type A (left), Type B (middle) and Type C (right)

Writer Tetsuo Kinjo originally envisioned an intergalactic reptilian creature named Bemular to be the character that would become Ultraman. The creature could grow in size to 164 feet, with the design being a cross between Garuda and Tengu. The original treatment was that Bemular would assist an attack team against threats such as other Kaiju. However, worries rose that viewers would be confused upon which monster to root for. Ultraman's memorable design was done by Tohl Narita and clay sculptor Akira Sasaki, with the grey alien concept in mind. Three Ultraman body suits were created for the show, all of which were based on the size of suit actor Bin Furuya. A lot of improvements to Ultraman's design were made during the series' progression. The first suit was known as Type A (episodes 1 to 13), followed by Type B (14–29), and finally Type C (30 and subsequent episodes).

The Type A suit had its mask created from fibre-reinforced plastic (FRP) and coated with latex, giving Ultraman a "wrinkled" face. The mask was originally intended to have a mouth-opening mechanism but the latex-coating prevented such functions. Bin Furuya mentioned that Type A fitted him poorly and it forced him to hunch a bit. Followed by the deterioration of the Type A suit, Type B was made later on. Its mask removed the mouth-opening mechanism concept and latex coating, opting instead for a full FRP cover. Some of the staff in the series were not made aware of the changes that were made and were surprised by Ultraman's face having a sudden change from an alien-like face to an "iron mask" looking face. The Type B mask even had its jaw feature more narrow and sharpened compared to the Type A design. Type B was also bigger compared to Type A and according to Furuya; "it was better fitting, and had padding so it looked like Ultraman was more muscular". The Type C suit was nonetheless an improved variant of Type B, which featured slight changes in the facial positions of the eyes, mouth and ears. The rest of the body of each suit was a painted wetsuit, a design choice that was previously used for the Kemur Man from Ultra Q, the series that preceded Ultraman. Type A's boots were derived from modified Jika-tabi, Type B variants were pointed shoes with hidden zippers and Type C were red leather shoes painted silver.

Due to being made with wet suits and latices, the suits were incapable of sustaining long periods of time. What happened to each of the suits follows:

- Type A: Was decommissioned due to deterioration, its mask having poorly aged due to its latex-coating. It was briefly modified into Imitation Ultraman for episode 18.
- Type B: Was put into storage after the Type C suit was commissioned. It was later stolen from Tsuburaya's warehouse sometime in the 1970s and its current location and status are unknown, or even if it still exists at all.
- Type C: Was handed over to the programming staff following the series' conclusion. The mask was removed at that time due to having poorly aged.

According to Furuya, the original Ultraman suit was destroyed, but this has not been confirmed.

=== The Color Timer ===
Ultraman's victory was never assured, as Ultraman's powers and, indeed, his very life force, came from solar energy, which was heavily reduced by Earth's filtering atmosphere. His time limit was stated to be three minutes, though certain scenes do show him capable of still fighting while exceeding this limit.

When Ultraman first appeared, his Color Timer (カラータイマー, Karā Taimā; or "warning light" in the U.S.), was a rich cyan color. As time goes on, the color timer turns solid red, and then starts to blink, giving off a warning chime as it did so. When Ultraman runs out of energy, the color timer goes out and turns black. Ultraman's color timer is linked directly to his heart, and damaging it will cause mortal injury or serious pain to Ultraman. Ultraman and other Ultra Warriors from M-78 receive their Color Timers through modification surgery in hopes of notifying them about energy reduction when fighting against monster threats on certain planets or locations.

According to Tohl Narita, Ultraman was not originally meant to have a time limit, as his original design lacked one. This was actually made to reduce the cost of the special effects. The protagonist of the succeeding series, Ultraseven, averted this through his forehead "Beam Lamp" feature but subsequent Ultra Warriors after Seven, however, returned to the time limit trend. Seven's lack of Color Timer was explained by Tsuburaya due to his early days as a non-combatant officer, having originally been sent only to observe the Milky Way galaxy before becoming more intimately involved in Earth's affairs.

=== Naming ===
The name Ultraman was originally what the alien spaceman from Nebula M78 called himself when he spoke to a comatose Hayata about merging their forms as compensation for the accident that caused their ships to collide. After Ultraman's first battle with the monster Bemular, Ide asks Hayata what the hero's name is; Hayata replies "Does 'Ultraman' sound all right?" This originally implied that the name was conceived by Hayata himself, but later appearances by other aliens and Zoffy confirm that it is his actual name.

In certain media, Ultraman was referred to as Original Ultraman (初代ウルトラマン, Shōdai Urutoraman). Dating back to 1971, the emergence of the main character of the fourth Ultra Series, The Return of Ultraman, would cause confusion due to sharing the same name, hence the original was called Original Ultraman and the second incarnation was called Ultraman II (二世ウルトラマン, Nisei Urutoraman) before he received his own name, Ultraman Jack (ウルトラマンジャック, Urutoraman Jakku) by Noboru Tsuburaya, Tsuburaya Productions' president at that time. Said name is also one of the original concepts of Ultraman Taro and it first appeared in acknowledgement during the 1984 film, Ultraman Story.

Additionally, Ultraman Jack was meant to be Ultraman returning to Earth, but was made as a separate character out of respect for the late Eiji Tsuburaya, who died in 1970.

== History ==
=== Showa era ===
Ultraman is an Ultra Warrior (ウルトラ戦士, Urutora senshi) that hails from Nebula M78. While chasing the space monster Bemular, he accidentally collided with SSSP Officer Shin Hayata who was on a patrolling duty. Feeling guilty for playing a part in his death, Ultraman merged their bodies together and gave Shin the Beta Capsule. From that day forward, Ultraman staunchly defended Earth against aliens and monsters, with Shin Hayata and the SSSP assisting him. While Hayata worked alongside his fellow SSSP members, he would switch to Ultraman should the situation call for it.

In the series finale, a race of aliens from the planet Zetton, and their vanguard kaiju, Zetton (named after its planet of origin), attack. Ultraman, aided by the SSSP, battled Zetton, but before Zetton was defeated, he mortally wounded Ultraman with a weapon the hero had not expected, one that directly targeted his Color Timer/warning light. That damage caused him to lose almost all his energy instantly.

When Zoffy, Ultraman's superior, arrived to retrieve the fallen hero with a special life energy, Ultraman pleaded for Hayata's life to also be spared, going as far as to offer his new life to the human, so that Hayata could live as a normal man. Zoffy agreed with Ultraman and gave Hayata a spare life energy, he then separated them, but left Hayata with no memory between the time that he first collided with Ultraman's ship (in the first episode), and the time that he is shown standing outside the Science Special Search Party Headquarters, holding the Beta Capsule but apparently not knowing what it is or what it does as he watched Zoffy take Ultraman home. This is a rather different ending to the series than stated in the English dub, which stated both that Ultraman would return and that Hayata retained not only his Beta Capsule but also, apparently, his full memories of all his experiences as he awaited Ultraman's return. Coincidentally, this ending appears to have become the definitive ending to Tsuburaya, as Hayata reappeared several times throughout succeeding Ultra Series as Ultraman's host in times of need.

Revive! Ultraman gives an alternate ending to the series 29 years after the series finale, where Zoffy recombined Hayata and Ultraman after giving the former another life force. After the battle against Zetton, both Hayata and Ultraman were shaken to the core following their previous defeat. Past monsters were mysteriously revived and Ultraman defeated them again, but he was once again weakened by Zetton. When it seemed that his defeat would be repeated, SSSP member Ide created a specialized formula that replenished Ultraman's energy, allowing him to finally defeat Zetton and properly put an end to his mission on Earth.

He would later join the Ultra Brothers (ウルトラ兄弟, Urutora Kyōdai), a group of Ultra Warriors dedicated to protecting the galaxy.

=== Subsequent history in the Showa era ===
- The Return of Ultraman (1971): Appeared in episode 38, he and Ultraseven rescued Ultraman Jack who was defeated by Alien Nackle. Though not appearing at first, he communicated with Go/Ultraman Jack via telepathy in episode 51. In the latter episode, he was voiced by Isao Yatsu (谷津勲, Yatsu Isao).
- Ultraman Ace (1972): Appeared in episodes 1, 13, 14, 26 and 27 but out of all these episodes, the only scene that featured him talking was in episode 13 with his voice provided by Mahito Tsujimura (辻村真人, Tsujimura Mahito). He was shown witnessing Ace's fusion with Hokuto and Minami. In subsequent appearances, he and the Ultra Brothers were captured by Yapool in episodes 13 and 14 and by Alien Hipporito in 26 and 27. His suit in episode 1 is simply repainted from Ultraman Jack.
- Ultraman Taro (1973): Appeared in episodes 1, 25, 33, 34 and 40. In episode 1, he was among the Ultra Brothers that witnessed the fusion of Ultraman Taro and Kotaro and later delivered the Ultra Bell to the Ultra Tower in episode 25. In 33 and 34, he and the rest of the Ultra Brothers joined Taro on Earth while fighting against Alien Temperor. In episode 40, he was the first to fight Tyrant on Uranus, but was defeated in the end.
- Ultraman Leo (1974): Appeared in episodes 38 and 39. He and the Ultra Brothers tried to confront Astra, who had stolen the Ultra Key from the Land of Light, until he was revealed to be an impostor named Alien Babarue by Ultraman King. He is voiced by Shinya Nazuka (名塚 新也, Nazuka Shinya).
- The 6 Ultra Brothers vs. the Monster Army (1974 (Thailand)/1979 (Japan)): In this work, Ultraman was voiced by Toshio Furukawa (古川 登志夫, Furukawa Toshio).
- Ultraman 80: Ultraman was mentioned by Ultraman 80 during the latter's battle against Alien Baltan VI as he used the same cutting halo to defeat his opponent. Ultraman's "reappearance" here was reused from episode 16 of the original series.
- Ultraman Zoffy: Ultra Warriors vs. the Giant Monster Army (1984): In this work, Ultraman was voiced by Kenyu Horiuchi (堀内 賢雄, Horiuchi Ken'yū).
- Ultraman Story (1984): Kenyu Horiuchi reprised his role in this work.

=== Heisei era ===
- Ultraman Zearth (1996): Ultraman was referenced multiple times in this film, as his giant statue which was dedicated to his series' 30th anniversary was quickly eaten by Cotton-Poppe. When Katsuto/Ultraman Zearth performed his Speciu-shula Ray in front of a mirror, Ultraman's image can be seen on his reflection. In the second film, Ultraman was referenced again where his defeat by Zetton becomes an inspiration for MYDO officers to create a cannon with a similar energy beam output to Zetton's to defeat Lady Benzene's Ultraman Shadow. However, the plan backfired, not only because of Shadow not being a genuine Ultraman, but of quickly setting up a protector on his Color Timer the moment the beam hit his chest, which resulted in reflecting it back to MYDO.
- Ultraman Tiga (1996): Appeared in episode 49. Ultraman assisted Ultraman Tiga to defeat monster Yanakahgi. Considering that Tiga is from an entirely different timeline than the original Nebula M78 universe, a lot of plot contortions are made in order to bring together this dream team to honor the 30th anniversary of the original Ultraman. Thus, the Ultraman in question here is in fact an alternate universe version. He is voiced by Issei Futamata (二又 一成, Futamata Issei).
- Ultraman Mebius & Ultraman Brothers (2006): In this film, it was revealed that Ultraman, Ultraseven, Ultraman Jack and Ultraman Ace had sealed Yapool and his Super Beast, U-Killersaurus, beneath the lake of Kobe at the cost of most of their energy. In the end, they assumed human lives, Ultraman masking himself as Hayata. 20 years later, Hayata becomes the airport administrator in Kobe Airport and approaches himself to Mirai Hibino (the human form of Ultraman Mebius) alongside his comrades, giving him advice after being shaken due to being unable to save a young boy in the past. The human Ultra Brothers later witnessed Mebius' battle against an alien group that had arrived to revive Yapool. When Mebius was unable to handle the invaders, the Ultra Brothers had no choice but to transform again for the first time in 20 years. But even after Mebius was rescued, they quickly fell prey to the aliens' trap and were used to unseal Yapool before they could stop them. While fighting against Yapool/U-Killersaurus, Zoffy and Ultraman Taro came to their aid and replenished their energies. With the Ultra Brothers united, they combined with Mebius to form Mebius Infinity to defeat Yapool and free Kobe. As this film also commemorated the 40th anniversary of the Ultra Series and Ultraman, the character himself was given a wrinkled face, in tribute to the original Type A suit.
- Ultraman Mebius (2006): Following the events of the film, Ultraman returned in episode 47 and 50 of the series. After Alien Mefilas brainwashed the whole population into becoming his servants, Mirai seeks Hayata's help, but he was not able to do anything, as Mefilas' actions were not endangering the civilians. However, after seeing Ultraman Mebius fighting against Mefilas (the latter almost killing the GUYS officers), Hayata was able to interfere again as Ultraman and ended the fight with no losses on both sides, telling Mefilas to retreat instead. The alien complied to his wishes and looked forward to their next confrontation, although he was killed by Alien Empera shortly after due to his incompetence. He later had a short conversation with Teppei Kuze, one of the GUYS officers, and was among the Ultra Warriors that cleansed the Sun from Alien Empera's sunspot.
- Superior Ultraman 8 Brothers (2008): In this work, Ultraman is also an alternate universe character who came to Earth alongside his comrades, Ultra Seven, Ultraman Jack and Ultraman Ace. Having arrived on Earth, they assumed the lives of mundane civilians, with Ultraman disguising himself as bike shop owner Shin Hayata, having married Akiko Fuji and having a daughter named Rena Hayata (based on Rena Yanase from Ultraman Tiga). Having lived on Earth for a long time, they eventually forgot their actual identities. This, however, all changes when the safety of their Earth was threatened by unnamed dark figures, until their wives reminded them whom they really were, allowing Hayata and the others to regain their memories and powers as Ultra Warriors, assisting the alternate Heisei Ultra Warriors and Ultraman Mebius (the prime reality version which was forcefully brought into their universe) against their enemy. In the end, after Daigo completed the space vessel which meant to bring its passengers to the Land of Light, Hayata and his comrades join along with their wives, as Hayata and Akiko rode a space vessel that resembles the SSSP's Jet VTOL. This work also reuses the "New Type A" face used by Ultraman in the previous film.

=== Galaxy Crisis era ===
- Ultra Galaxy Mega Monster Battle (2007): Ultraman pursued the evil Alien Raybrad, but was defeated and petrified in a mountain on the planet Boris until Reimon and the ZAP SPACY crew freed him. Ultraman returned the favor to the Pendragon crew by attacking King Joe Black to give the humans enough time to escape Boris' destruction.
- Ultra Galaxy Mega Monster Battle: Never Ending Odyssey (2008): Ultraman returns in the final episode alongside Ultra Seven to rescue the ZAP SPACY crew again from Alien Raybrad. At the same time, Seven also reclaimed his Capsule Monster Miclas from Rei.
- Ultraman Mebius Side Story: Ghost Reverse (2009): Ultraman was among the Ultra Brothers that witnessed Ace and Taro's departure when intercepting Hikari's Ultra Sign.
- Mega Monster Battle: Ultra Galaxy (2009): Following Belial's escape, Ultraman was among a number of Ultra Warriors that tried to stop Belial from advancing to the Plasma Spark. Alongside Ultra Seven and Mebius, they survived Belial's assault in the Land of Light and recruited Rei to assist them in their battle, later being joined by the Leo Brothers and Seven's son, Ultraman Zero.
- Ultraman Zero: The Revenge of Belial (2010): Ultraman was among the Space Garrison members that studied the Darklop's remains and donated his light to Zero's travel sphere so that the youth could travel to an alternate universe.
- Ultraman Saga (2012): When Zero went to another alternate space to battle Alien Bat, Ultraman and the other Ultra Brothers sensed that Zero was in danger and worried for the youth. In the director's cut version of the film, the Ultra Brothers arrived to assist Ultraman Saga in fighting against Hyper Zetton's revived monster army. Ultraman fought against Antlar, an old foe from his time on Earth.

=== New Generation Heroes era ===
- Ultraman Ginga (2013): Alongside the Ultra Brothers, Ultraman was among the combatants of the Dark Spark War, fighting against Zetton, but soon cursed into becoming a Spark Doll by Dark Lugiel when he and the rest of the Space Garrisons tried to protect Taro (thus making him the only Spark Doll to retain sentience in the series). His Spark Doll soon fell into Dark Lugiel's hands and was used by Seiichirō Isurugi alongside Ultra Seven against Ultraman Ginga before the man was defeated, allowing Hikaru (Ginga's host) to recover it. Chigusa briefly uses the Spark Doll alongside Kenta (Ultraman Tiga) and a reformed Seiichirō to hold off Super Grand King for Ginga to free Misuzu. In the aftermath of Ginga's battle with Lugiel, Ultraman and the other Spark Dolls' curse was lifted and they returned to space. In the Extra Episode, a copy of Ultraman's Spark Doll was utilized by Chigusa again to fight Zetton, who was controlled by Dark Lugiel's former minion, Alien Magma. Previously in 2013, he was present in an award ceremony when the Ultra Series was nominated as the series with the most spin-offs and sequels, holding the certificate given by Guinness World Records with Takuya Negishi, Hikaru Raido's actor in Ultraman Ginga.
- Ultraman Ginga Theater Special: Ultra Monster ☆ Hero Battle Royal! (2014): Ultraman was among the sketches that Tomoya draw in his book until a strange cosmic energy wave took effect, thus materializing Ultraman and other sketches into Spark Dolls. Ultraman was used by Tomoya when he and his friends tried to play, using Ultra Warrior Spark Dolls, until software bugs created a group of five Dark Ultramen for them to fight. Tomoya/Ultraman fights against Chaosroid U and wins by firing his Spacium Ray.
- Ultraman Ginga S (2014): As revealed in episode 54 of Shin Ultraman Retsuden, Ultraman and the rest of the Ultra Brothers donated their powers to Taro when he raced to Earth after detecting a new threat. In Ultraman's case, he donated his Spacium Ray and Ultra Slash, which soon became one of Ultraman Ginga Strium's powers. After his job on Earth ended, Taro returned the loaned powers back to the Ultra Brothers.
- Ultraman X The Movie (2016): Ultraman was summoned by the green stone that was previously used to seal Zaigorg and assisted Ultraman Tiga and Ultraman X against Zaigorg and his Devil Clone Beasts. Facing Gorg Fire Golza, Ultraman finds himself accompanied by Asuna via Xio Bazooka and Wataru in Land Musketty. With Ultraman injured by Golza's cannonball, Asuna and Wataru used the powers of Cyber Gomora and Cyber Zetton, respectively, to delay Golza while Ultraman recovered and destroyed it with his Spacium Ray. After being captured and having its energy stolen by Zaigorg, Ultraman's Cyper Card resonated with Ultraman X and created the Beta Spark Armor, with X using it to free Ultraman and Tiga. Both him and Tiga participated in the formation of Cyber Wing to ease the worldwide Ultras' battles with Tsurugi Demaaga. After the battle ended, Ultraman took his leave, followed by Ultraman X.
- Ultraman Orb (2016): Ultraman was the one who sealed Maga-Zetton until it was reawakened sometime prior to the series. Maga-Zetton fought Ultraman Orb and was defeated, revealing Ultraman's Ultra Fusion Card, but the ensuing battle turned the entire forest area into a smoldering crater. Alongside Ultraman Tiga, Ultraman's power is channeled to Ultraman Orb when using the form Spacium Zeperion, which allowed him to use Ultraman's power as well. In his human form of Gai Kurenai, he was able to utilize Ultraman's power in a smaller range by reflecting an incoming attack, having first used to counter Alien Zetton Maddock. During the final episode of the series, Ultraman and the other Ultra Fusion Cards in Gai's possession transform into physical projections of themselves to assist Ultraman Orb in delivering the finishing blow on Magata no Orochi, while Juggler held off the monster long enough to expose its weak spot.
- Ultraman Geed (2017): Alongside the Ultra Brothers, Ultraman participated in a fight against Belial before he was caught in the Crisis Impact. His power lives on through his Ultra Capsule, called an Ultraman Capsule (ウルトラマンカプセル, Urutoraman Kapuseru), as Riku used it in unison with the Belial Capsule to assume Ultraman Geed (Primitive). According to director Koichi Sakamoto, said form utilized the brutish strength of Belial while retaining Ultraman's heart of justice. In the final episode, Ultraman was among the Ultras whose beings resonated with Geed's spirit during his final fight with Belial Atrocious, as Ultraman King materialized other four clones of his Fusion Rise forms to join the battle.
- Ultraman R/B (2018): Ultraman and Belial's R/B Crystals were among those in Saki's possession before she relinquished them to Asahi.
- Ultra Galaxy Fight: New Generation Heroes (2019): Alongside members of the Ultra Brothers, Ultraman was mentioned to have fought against Ultra Dark-Killer and succeeded by donating his energy to Taro. After the fiend revived and established the League of Darkness, the Ultra Brothers assembled the New Generation Heroes and observed their battle from the Land of Light.

=== Reiwa era ===
- Ultraman Z (2020): His power inhabited the Ultraman Medal (ウルトラマンメダル, Urutoraman Medaru), one of the many Ultra Medals manufactured in the Land of Light. When Genegarg stole them and was destroyed by Ultraman Z's Zestium Beam, said Medal was among those scattered from the explosion and salvaged by STORAGE member Yoko. She would give it to the Ultra, allowing Z to assume Beta Smash.
- Shin Ultraman (2022): He is the hero of the film, who came to Earth to defend it from monsters and aliens.

== Profile ==
Ultraman's statistics below were never mentioned in the original series, but were brought up in magazines and official websites. There are also certain succeeding series that deviate Ultraman's original statistics:

- Height: 40 m (50 m in episode 40 of Ultraman Taro)
- Weight: 35,000 t
- Flight Speed: Mach 5
- Birthplace: Nebula M78, Land of Light
- Age: Over 20,000 years old
- Year Debut: 1966
- First Appearance: The Birth of Ultraman (1966)

=== Description ===
As the official website of Tsuburaya Productions stated: "[Ultraman] visited the Earth after chasing the Space Monster Bemular, he protected the Earth against monster and alien threats. Aside from his main attack Spacium Ray, he also possesses a number of techniques. His place of origin is Nebula M78. Despite his strength, he is also friendly to non-hostile monsters. His human form on Earth is Shin Hayata of the Science Special Search-Party. He is also a member of the Ultra Brothers."

=== Transformation ===
Hayata himself transformed into Ultraman through the use of the Beta Capsule (ベーターカプセル, Bētā Kapuseru), a flashlight-like object which allows him to switch between his human state and Ultraman. By pressing the red button on the capsule, a stream of light forms a spiral-like circle which warped his body as Ultraman rises, appearing in a manner that involves his right arm forming a fist forward and his left folded down.

The Beta Capsule is always shown stored in Hayata's SSSP jacket. In episode 22 of Ultraman, the Beta Capsule (or to a lesser extent, Ultraman's power) had the ability to free Hayata from external influence, as the Underground People tried to control Ultraman by brainwashing Hayata until Ultraman's transformation freed him. But despite this, the gadget can also be easily lost, as shown in episode 26 during Ultraman's fight with Gomora, where he accidentally dropped it and it was picked up by a local boy, who mistook it for a toy. This was also played for the sake of comedy, as seen in episode 34 when Hayata mistook a curry spoon for the Beta Capsule before switching to the original one. Two other versions also existed:

- In the beginning of Ultraman X The Movie, Dr. Guruman attempted to replicate the Beta Capsule in hopes of summoning Ultraman. But instead, it triggered a chain reaction that causes the whole research lab of Operation Base X to explode.
- Ultraman's data was later used by Guruman to create his Cyber Card, which soon brings forth the creation of X Beta Capsule (エクスベータカプセル, Ekusu Bēta Kapuseru) for Daichi to use with X Park Lence and transform into Ultraman Exceed X Beta Spark Armor.

In the original concept for The Return of Ultraman, Hideki Goh (the series' main protagonist) was meant to use the Beta Capsule to become Ultraman Jack.

=== Other forms ===
- Glitter Version (グリッターバージョン, Gurittā Bājon): Featured in Superior 8 Ultraman Brothers. Ultraman and the alternate Ultra Warriors received strength from the citizens' hopes and gained a power boost that was identical to Tiga's Glitter Tiga. His attack, combined with the alternate Ultras, was called Superior Myth Flasher (スペリオルマイスフラッシャー, Superioru Maisu Furasshā), made by combining their original finisher attacks.
- Ultraman Dark (ウルトラマンダーク, Urutoraman Dāku): The corrupted form of Ultraman, which first appeared during the events of Ultraman Ginga. After Seiichirō Isurugi was given the Spark Dolls of Ultraman and Ultra Seven, the Dark Dummy Sparks (ダークダミースパーク, Dāku Damī Supāku) given to him allowed the man to assume the corrupted forms of the two Ultra Warriors, Ultraman Dark and Ultra Seven Dark, respectively. Ultraman Dark's appearance is identical to Ultraman, but with black colors replacing the original silver, and Ultraman's eyes and Color Timer both shine red. His attacks retain the same name and power statistics, though they appear to be darker. Ultraman Dark (Seiichirō) first appeared after Ultraman Ginga defeated Zaragas, and brutally attacked the Ultra Warrior before swapping out with Ultra Seven, but before he could deliver the finishing blow, Seiichirō was stopped by Misuzu Isurugi, his daughter. Ultraman's Spark Doll was returned to normal after Ultraman Ginga defeated Seiichirō. The suit of Ultraman Dark was reused from Ultraman Geist, another evil doppelgänger of Ultraman that appeared in certain stage shows. Also, the third volume of Ultraman Ginga's Blu-ray/DVD release stated that his conception was based on Imitation Ultraman, a disguise assumed by Alien Zarab from episode 18 of Ultraman. In the 2014 crossover game Super Hero Generation, he demonstrated the attacks the Dark Specium Ray (ダークスペシウム光線, Dāku Supeshiumu Kōsen) and the Dark Ultra Slash (ダークウルトラスラッシュ, Dāku Urutora Surasshu).

=== Powers and abilities ===
Ultraman's combat technique usually relied on brute strength, which goes by fighting his opponents in melee combat, then finishing them with his beam attacks. In the middle of combat, he sometimes used different skills that either assist him in the combat or neutralize dangerous situations that the SSSP are involved in. His skin possessed natural protection against extreme heat, electricity and atomic bomb explosions.

His signature attack was the Specium Ray (スペシウム光線, Supeshiumu Kōsen), which was performed by having his forearms form a cross stance, with his left arm in a horizontal position and placed forward while his right arm is in a vertical position and placed backward, reflecting a shuriken. This finisher launches a beam of white energy which consists of an extraterrestrial mineral called Specium (スペシウム, Supeshiumu) that can be found on Mars (ep. 2). When his arms form the "+" stance, his right hand emits negative Spacium and his left arm emits positive Spacium, thus creating a destruction beam with the heat of 500,000 degrees and power level of 500,000 horsepower. Said mineral itself is the main weakness of Alien Baltan, one of the adversaries of Ultraman, and is frequently used to defeat other monsters-of-the-week. However, Spacium also has a counterpart, Spellgen, which was used by the second generation Alien Baltan (ep. 16) to counteract the Spacium Ray, prompting Ultraman to slice the Alien in half with the Ultra Slash attack. Certain monsters in the series have been shown to be resistant to the Spacium Ray, and took more than one shot to be killed.

Ultraman also uses the Ultra Slash (ウルトラスラッシュ, Urutora Surasshu), an energy projectile saw disc attack launched from Ultraman's right arm in a manner of a flying disc. This is mainly used to dismember an opponent, usually by slicing them into half down the middle. Like the Spacium Ray, it had its own weakness, certain opponents like Gubila (ep 23) or Keylla (ep 39) were able to catch the disk moments before it hit them and throw it back at the Ultra Warrior. There are also other non-conventional uses for the Ultra Slash:

- In episode 13 (the final episode) of Ultra Galaxy Mega Monster Battle, Ultraman summoned the Ultra Slash from his left arm and instead of throwing it, he used it to chop off King Joe Black's left arm in a similar manner to a karate chop to save the ZAP SPACY's Space Pendragon and escape Planet Boris.
- In Ultraman X The Movie, Ultraman first used the Ultra Slash in a manner of a shield to defend himself from Gorg Fire Golza's attack before it launched towards the monster.

== Human hosts and forms ==
=== Shin Hayata ===
Shin Hayata
- Ultra Series character
- Shin Hayata, portrayed by Susumu Kurobe circa 1966
- First appearance: Ultraman
- Created by: Eiji Tsuburaya
- Portrayed by: Susumu Kurobe
- Voiced by: Japanese; Takayuki Sugō (motion comic); Hideyuki Tanaka (anime); English; Fred Tatasciore (anime)

Shin Hayata (ハヤタ・シン(早田進), Hayata Shin) is the protagonist of the Ultraman TV series. He is 25 years old at the start of the series; he first encountered Ultraman when the giant hero accidentally collided with Hayata's VTOL Jet with his "Travel Sphere". Feeling guilty about the accident, Ultraman fuses himself with Hayata to ensure the man's survival, causing them to share the same life, also giving Hayata the means to fight against monster and alien threats. He is the Sub-Captain of the Science Special Search-Party and is in charge whenever Captain Toshio Muramatsu is unavailable. Although portrayed as a dutiful officer, there are also times where he was out of focus, sometimes for the sake of comedy. His connection to Ultraman remains a secret to the rest of the SSSP members even until the series finale; however, in episode 14 Muramatsu and member Arashi noticed that Hayata shared a similar injury to Ultraman after his fight against a monster. This was never brought up again later on.

In episode 39, the series finale, both Ultraman and Hayata were gravely injured after Zetton defeated them. Zoffy arrived to recover Ultraman and gave Hayata another life, allowing him to live while being separated from Ultraman. In the original Japanese ending, Hayata was left without any memories of Ultraman, but in the English dub, he retained his memory while telling his SSSP teammates that Ultraman would return to Earth. Coincidentally, this ending appears to have become the definitive ending to Tsuburaya, as Hayata later appeared in subsequent series with Ultraman. Revive! Ultraman also gave an alternate ending that allowed Hayata to retain both his connection with Ultraman and his memories.

Although Hayata does appear in person later on in other Ultra Series entries, starting from the following events of Mega Monster Battle: Ultra Galaxy, it was revealed that Hayata is no longer the original human who became one with Ultraman, but rather the Ultra Warrior in a human form, in a similar manner to Dan Moroboshi with Ultra Seven. While the reason for this is unknown, it is possible that Hayata and Ultraman separated sometime after Ultraman Mebius or the fact that since Return of Ultraman, the two never met again, thus "Hayata" becomes his human form ever since Ultraman's re-emergence. (Note: In episode 33 of Ultraman Taro, Hayata refused to be recognized as a human being, only using said name when entering Earth.)

Hayata is portrayed by Susumu Kurobe (黒部進, Kurobe Susumu) in all of his appearances. Originally, there was no audition for the role of Hayata, and he simply took the role after he was approached by Toho execs to take the role.

=== Other human hosts and forms ===
In certain circumstances, Ultraman would possess other people as substitute human hosts.

- In episode 33 and 34 of Ultraman Taro, the Ultra Brothers possessed the male ZAT officers in order to hide themselves from Alien Temperor, who was hunting them on Earth, and to teach Kotaro Higashi/Ultraman Taro not to be arrogant and to not rely on his brothers-in-arms too much. Ultraman possessed the ZAT officer Shūhei Aragaki (荒垣修平, Aragaki Shūhei) and later a volleyball player once Temperor saw through their deception.
- In Ultraman Ginga, Ultraman was transformed into a Spark Doll and was among those in Dark Lugiel's possession. It later ends up in Hikaru's possession. Ultraman would later be freed once Dark Lugiel was defeated, although another Ultraman Spark Doll appeared certain times after the series:
  - Ultraman's original Spark Doll at first was given to Seiichirō Isurugi (石動 誠一郎, Isurugi Seiichirō) alongside Ultra Seven's Spark Doll. Having been corrupted by Alien Nackle Gray, he used Ultraman's corrupted power, turning him into the dark Ultra Warriors Ultraman Dark and Ultra Seven Dark. He defeated Hikaru in their first encounter and invited him in his quest to rule over everything, but was rejected and defeated by Hikaru. Seiichirō's defeat had saved him from Gray's brainwashing and purified the two Ultra Warriors' Spark Dolls. He would later use the Ultra Seven Spark Doll for good to assist Ultraman Ginga when his daughter Misuzu falls victim to it like him.
  - In order to assist Ultraman Ginga in rescuing Misuzu from Gray's influence, Ultraman's Spark Doll was used by Chigusa Kuno (久野 千草, Kuno Chigusa) to help delay Super Grand King while Hikaru tried to reach Misuzu. She would later use the Spark Doll copy of Ultraman on two occasions, first against Alien Magma and Zetton in the extra episode of Ultraman Ginga and later in Mountain Peanuts (a magazine novel which served as a prologue to Ginga S) against Android One-Zero/Nosferu.
  - During the events of Ultraman Ginga Theater Special: Ultra Monster ☆ Hero Battle Royal!, Ultraman's Spark Doll was among the copies which were created when Tomoya Ichijōji (一条寺 友也, Ichijōji Tomoya)'s sketchbook of Ultra Monsters radiated strange cosmic waves. Tomoya would later use the Spark Doll when playing with his comrades, but later participated in a fight against a group of five evil Ultraman, facing Chaosroid U. Ultraman and the other fake Spark Dolls later reverted into his sketchbook once the effects of the cosmic radiation dried out.
- In Shin Ultraman (2022), Ultraman, whose original name in this continuity is Lipiah (リピアー, Ripiā), accidentally kills S-Class Species Suppression Protocol (SSSP) member Shinji Kaminaga (神永(かみなが) 新二(しんじ), Kaminaga Shinji) during his battle with the monster Neronga (who was created by aliens to destroy humanity) and takes his appearance and place which is prohibited under Space Garrison law. His superior, Zōffy, henceforth tells him that he must stand trial for such an act and deploys the ultimate biological weapon, Zetton, to destroy humanity. Ultraman activates his Beta Capsule while in a transformed state to defeat Zetton creating a black hole that engulfs him and the weapon but Zōffy saves him and asks him to go back to the Star of Light with him, but Ultraman declines the offer and transfers his life force to the original Shinji. This incarnation of Ultraman lacks a Color Timer on his chest. Instead, the red patterns on his body change to green when his energy is low. He initially appears with an all-silver body before merging with Shinji.
- In Ultraman: Rising, Ultraman assumes the form of Kenji "Ken" Sato, a famous but egotistical baseball player who is the second Ultraman in this continuity. He is reluctant to follow the legacy of his predecessor, his estranged father Hayao, but eventually comes to embrace his role as he cares for an infant Gigantron he names Emi. Hayao later adopts the name Ultradad.

== Cultural impact ==
=== Design basis ===
In the Ultra Series, Ultraman's main body has become the basis for most of the succeeding Ultra Warriors onwards. This design can be seen in certain Ultras such as Ultraman Jack (who was originally meant to be the returned original Ultraman), Ultraman Tiga, Ultraman Cosmos and others.

=== Parodies and homages ===
Ultraman, as well as the elements from his own series, has been referenced and parodied numerous times in popular culture; examples include:

- The South Park episode "Mecha-Streisand" features Leonard Maltin as Ultraman or Jet Jaguar.
- Ultraman appeared as the main character in the music video Yin Dee Mai Mee Bpunhah (Happy, No Problem) of Thai rock duo Asanee–Wasan in 1989.
- Episode 30 and 57 of Sgt. Frog features the Flash Spoon (フラッシュスプーン, Furasshu Supūn), a spoon-themed object which turns its user into a giant, much like the Beta Capsule. When activated, the user rises in a similar manner to the Ultraman.
- Episode 3 of Wooser's Hand-to-Mouth Life Phantasmagoric Arc has Wooser imagine himself fighting against Len who wears a monster costume while he wears a cap with Ultraman's fin-like head and performs the Spacium Ray pose.
- Manga artist Akira Toriyama is a fan of science fiction movies, as well as the Ultra Series' Ultraman and Ultra Seven. One of his manga, Dr. Slump, features two minor characters, Nekotoraman and Nekotoraseven, on a theatrical poster pointed out by Senbei Norikami. Also, episode 1 of the manga's anime adaptation has a character themed after Ultraman, who pulls up the sun with his fishing rod.
- Chapter 1 of My Hero Academia manga features Ultraman as a silhouettes of one of the many superheroes.
- Episode 15 of OVA Patlabor: The New Files bears multiple parodies and tributes to the final episodes of Ultraman and Ultra Seven. The point of view character, Noa Izumi transforms into Ingraman (parodying Ultraman and Ultra Seven) and fights against Griffon (parodying Zetton), but loses to it and the Section 2 Division 2 members destroy it by themselves. In the end, Ingraman's bond with Noa was ended by Zero (parodying Zoffy) and Noa gains another life.
- According to A Certain Magical Index's writer Kiyotaka Haimura, the design of Accelerator's shirt changes from being based on Devilman to the original Ultraman. This change is made during Volume 5 of the novel series to commemorate the character's change in sides, from antagonist to supporting protagonist.
- In the Ben 10 franchise, one of Ben Tennyson's aliens, Way Big, is a To'kustar, a large humanoid alien who resembles the original Ultraman in both size and appearance. His species' name is a play on the tokusatsu genre, while his cosmic ray attack is based on the Spacium Ray.
- Ultimate Girls has the main character Silk Koharuno and UFO-Man fighting giant monsters in a similar manner to Ultraman.
- Episode 93 of Gin Tama features Space Woman, a gigantic alien with a similar appearance to Ultraman.
- The first episode of Concrete Revolutio has the superhuman of the week, Gross Augen as a giant hero fuse with Akira Shirota and fight against the S Planeterian.
- Issue #67 of Marvel Comics' Exiles has Morph changing his appearance into that of Ultraman. Issue #66-68 of the series introduces the Science Squad, an attack team founded by the Curt Connors of Earth-3752, based on the SSSP from Ultraman.
- Peyton Reed, the director of the Ant-Man films in the Marvel Cinematic Universe, said that Ant-Man's costume design was influenced by Ultraman, along with another tokusatsu superhero, Inframan.
- Birdy the Mighty focuses on a female alien Altera fusing with Tsutomu's mind after his body was gravely injured. As acknowledged by voice actor Kenichi Suzumura in an interview, the manga and its anime adaptation's premise is loosely adapted from Ultraman's situation with Hayata.

== In other media ==
The following below refers to Ultraman and Hayata's appearance outside of TV, such as manga and novel adaptations:

=== Films ===
The CGI Ultraman, as shown in the clip Ultraman_n/a

- On July 16, 2015, Tsuburaya Productions streamed a region-locked video on their official YouTube site titled as "Ultraman_n/a" without any description. Set in Shibuya, Tokyo, a giant monster emerges from underground and is quickly countered by Ultraman, before the fight concludes the video ends with the text "7.7", a reference to series creator Eiji Tsuburaya's birth date. This video received a lot of attention, mainly due to both Ultraman and the monster in question being rendered CGI models instead of suit actors. In the clip, Ultraman is shown opening his mouth, a feature which was originally planned for the Type A suit, but had to be scrapped.
- In August 2019, a movie adaptation for the original Ultraman was announced, named as Shin Ultraman under the direction of Shinji Higuchi and writing of Hideaki Anno, both men previously cooperated for Toho's Shin Godzilla. The movie was slated to be released in 2021, as additional cast members were announced a month later. On December 15, during Tsuburaya Production's Tsubucon fan convention, the design of Ultraman was unveiled, which takes the design cues from Tohl Narita's early impression of the character, lacking a Color Timer.

=== Manga ===
- Ultraman is the main character of a popular manga series, Ultraman Chotoshi Gekiden. In the 1996 OVA, he is voiced by Toshiyuki Morikawa (森川 智之, Morikawa Toshiyuki).
- In the 2003 manga Ultraman THE FIRST (ja:ウルトラマン THE FIRST) Ultraman and Hayata's role remain the same, as the manga is a reinterpretation of the TV series. However, additional plot elements were added, such as making the Alien Baltan the manga's main antagonist, who orchestrates almost every event in hopes of studying Ultraman's strength and weaknesses. In his final battle, Ultraman fought against Zetton (which was re-imagined as a colossal monster with knowledge of Ultraman's techniques) and was defeated by its overwhelming strength until the SSSP defeated it in a similar manner to the series. Ultraman was soon picked up by Zoffy, with Hayata being separated and given a new life.
- In the 2005 manga Ultraman Story 0 (ja:ウルトラマンSTORY 0), Ultraman is the first of his kind to be mutated into a giant after the Plasma Spark radiated their world. He is also the first one to face the Alien Baltan, the Ultra Warriors' enemies.
- The 2011 Ultraman manga takes in an alternate timeline with Ultraman being the only Ultra Warrior to set foot on Earth. Several years after the giant left the Earth, Shin Hayata's (voiced by Takayuki Sugō (菅生 隆之, Sugō Takayuki) in Motion Comic) memory of Ultraman is completely erased and he has settled down and had a family, with a son named Shinjiro Hayata. Hayata also becomes the Minister of Defense after retiring from his service in the SSSP. Although Ultraman had long left, his fusion with Hayata left the man with his DNA, which gives Hayata superhuman abilities. 12 years prior to the story, he regains his full memory of Ultraman after watching footage of Bemular attacking an airplane, and the rest of the SSSP members had protected him from being test subjects. His son, Shinjiro inherits these powers and the father-son pair are enlisted into the reformed SSSP, whose new mission is to fight against rogue aliens. The Ultraman title lives within battle suits called Ultraman Suits (ウルトラマンスーツ, Urutoraman Sūtsu), which were designed for combat, with Shinjiro taking one of the suits and inheriting his father's title as Ultraman. Other than the prototype and finalized product used by Shinjiro, two more Ultraman suits were made as the series progressed, one was called Ver. 7.1 (based on Ultra Seven) used by Dan Moroboshi and the non-SSSP manufactured suit, Ver. A. (based on Ultraman Ace), used by civilian Seiji Hokuto.
  - In Chapter 70, he was actually revealed to have been disguised as Bemular, an antihero alien whose exo-suit bears the same technology as the Ultraman Suits. His true motive is unknown, aside from calling Shinjiro Hayata's inheritance of Ultraman's power a nuisance.

=== Novels ===
- The novel adaptation of Ultraman, written by Tetsuo Kinjo in August 1967, Ultraman's role is historically the same as the TV series. Aside from that, the novel incorporates leftover plans from the series which never made it into the final cut, such as having Alien Mefilas form an alliance with past aliens, and having Geronimon revive Gomora and Red King instead of Draco and Telesdon (as was done in episode 37 (the U.S. dub of said episode, however, used the first two names, probably by mistake)). Another leftover plan that was incorporated into the story is also the scene where Ultraman died after his Color Timer was shattered by Zetton, which was omitted from the television series due to it being too violent for children.
- Another Genesis, a novel series launched in 2012, has Ultraman's design drastically altered. Following the destruction of the Land of Light at the hands of Ultraman Belial, Ultraman fell into a deep seclusion and went mad, resolving to restore his destroyed home world by hunting shards of the fallen Plasma Spark. He first appeared in Chapter 2, facing off against a giant Antlar that mutated from the effects of a Plasma Spark shard. He emerges victorious and mercilessly stabs Antlar with the shard to death. He reappears in Chapter 9, having trailed Blast, the main protagonist of the novel (whose body was altered after a Plasma Spark shard was imbued to his heart) and had a short scuffle with him until he ripped of the shard from Blast's chest, simultaneously killing him. During that time, his image drastically changed to resemble Ultraman Belial.
- Ultraman appeared during the climax of Ernest Cline's 2011 novel Ready Player One, during which the main character, Wade Owen Watts/Parzival, acquired the Beta Capsule and transformed into Ultraman to fight against Nolan Sorrento/IOI-655321, who piloted Mechagodzilla. In the 2018 film adaptation of the novel, director Steven Spielberg was unable to secure the rights to Ultraman and instead had both the Iron Giant and the RX-78-2 Gundam fulfilled the same role.
- Ultraman appeared in Mountain Peanuts, an anthology series from Tatarajima Futatabi released in June 2019. Taking place a year before Ultraman Ginga S, Ultraman was transformed from his Spark Doll by Chigusa Kuno, who wished to defend the civilians in against Nosferu Lived by Android One-Zero. Their battle resulted with Nosferu defeated and Chigusa awakened in a crater.
- Although he never appeared, Ultraman was mentioned in the 2016 novel Ultraman F, which is a non-canon story that took place one year after Ultraman leaves the Earth. Here, Hayata allowed himself to be experimented on in hopes of gathering secrets from what is left of Ultraman's remains. A child scientist named Soso (who would later become Dark Mephisto) revealed that Ultraman had three forms (which is largely based on his costume changes during his show's runtime), with each symbolizing Ultraman's battle specifications (Type A for strength, Type B for random techniques and Type C for long-ranged attacks).

=== Video games ===
- In the game City Shrouded in Shadow, Ultraman appears in the first level, fighting against his impostor, Imitation Ultraman (later revealing the fake to be Alien Zarab). Their battle puts Ichi City in danger and sets the motion of the game, which involves the players (portrayed as civilians) trying to escape from the city as soon as possible, while the battle turns into the largest obstacle they will ever face. He later appears in level 14, teaming up with Ultramen Taro and Zero against the evil Ultra, Belial.
- A parody of Ultraman named Voltraman (who is green rather than red) is an unlockable character in the video game Tony Hawk's Underground 2: Remix, unlocked after finding and switching to him in the Kyoto level exclusive to that version.
- Ultraman is featured as one of the playable characters in the app game Monster Strike as part of the collaboration with the Ultra Series. When the players used the "Strike Shot", Ultraman would initiate his strongest attack, the Spacium Ray.
- In the 2020 mecha-themed fighting game Override 2: Super Mech League, Ultraman (based on the main character from the Netflix series) appears as a playable guest character.
- In the 2022 kaiju-themed game GigaBash, Ultraman, along with Alien Baltan, Ultraman Tiga, and Camearra, were featured as guest fighters in a DLC released on November 8, 2023. Although most of his actions and taunts reference his Showa incarnation, Ultraman's "Block Special" attack involves him rotating vertically in the air to kick the enemy, similar to his Shin Ultraman counterpart.

=== Stage shows ===
- Ultraman Festival live stages
- 2016: Ultraman appeared during the climax of the first arc of the stageshow when the Ultra Warriors were having a hard time facing Zetton Alien Baltan. Ultraman debuted his newest attack, the Colorium Ray (カラーリウム光線, Karāriumu Kōsen), an attack from a winning entry in a Televi Magazine competition. He was voiced by Takahiro Sakurai (櫻井孝宏, Sakurai Takahiro).
- 2018: Takahiro Sakurai reprised his role, along with the Ultra himself performing a combination attack with Taro, Cosmo Miracle Slash (コスモミラクルスラッシュ, Kosumo Mirakuru Surasshu) as part of the entry made by the children.

=== Comics ===
- Marvel Comics announced in November 2019 that they have partnered with Tsuburaya Productions to publish Ultraman comic books and graphic novels. A five issue miniseries titled The Rise of Ultraman released from September 2020 to January 2021. The aim of their partnership was to introduce Ultraman to new generation. It was followed by another five issue miniseries titled The Trials of Ultraman which started being published in March 2021.

== Reception ==
=== Critical commentary ===
- Kurobe: Ultraman is immortal, so that's why I want him to go on for more than 50 years.
- Furuya: He should go beyond our lifelines.
- Kurobe: So I want Tsuburaya to keep releasing Ultraman in any way possible. Whether it's television or films, for audiences in Japan and around the world to enjoy, if that continues, then Ultraman will live on. That's my wish.

— Interview with Susumu Kurobe, Hiroko Sakurai and Bin Furuya, SciFi JAPAN TV

Todd Gilchrist of the IGN describes both Hayata and Ultraman as "a Peter Parker-style everyman becomes a superhero whenever alien monsters invade Earth, which conveniently occurs at least once every episode; subsequently, some fairly awkward fight scenes ensue, and the world eventually is saved from certain destruction." He also said that among the reason of the series' popularity were either due to Hayata talking directly to the audience, the SSSP investigating cases, or Ultraman's battle with the monsters and aliens "whose girth is matched only by his ability to flail his arms and flash his eyes." He gives the series the rating of 8 out of 10.

While reviewing the complete DVD series of Ultraman, R. L. Shaffer (also from IGN) described Ultraman as "a giant, skyscraper-sized extraterrestrial being that protects us from equally gigantic monsters, aliens, dinosaurs and other nefarious foes. Each week, Ultraman faces off against fantastically fun villains, destroying towns, villages, forests and cities along the way.". Nevertheless, he admitted that the series "become a cult sensation, largely thanks to its monsters and dazzling battles" and gives a rating 8 out of 10.

Bin Furuya, Ultraman's suit actor, has said that when he first wore the Ultraman suit, Eiji Tsuburaya had predicted that the show would create good memories for the children watching. Furuya trained for his role in Ultraman by practicing its beam techniques and "Shuwatch!" pose, inspired by "tap dancing and karate movements". As the Ultraman suit was very thin, he mentioned having received injuries in several ways during the set, so much so that Kurobe and Hiroko joked "of all the casts of Ultraman, he would be the first to go". When being asked what Ultra Warrior and Ultra Monster is his favorite, he answered the original Ultraman and Red King respectively, having enjoyed their fight scene in the show. His favorite episode of Ultraman is 23, which featured the appearance of Jamila, a monster who was mutated from an abandoned astronaut and tried to seek vengeance upon the government. Furuya mentioned that he genuinely cried while portraying Ultraman when he was forced to kill the monster. He also stated that although he liked playing the role of Ultraman, he enjoyed his time as Member Amagi for being able to expose his face. Furuya originally did not like acting as Ultraman, fearing that several scenes on set would bring harm to him, especially when recording scenes in water, which would enter his suit and he feared he would drown, but in the end, he grew more absorbed in his work and took a liking to it.

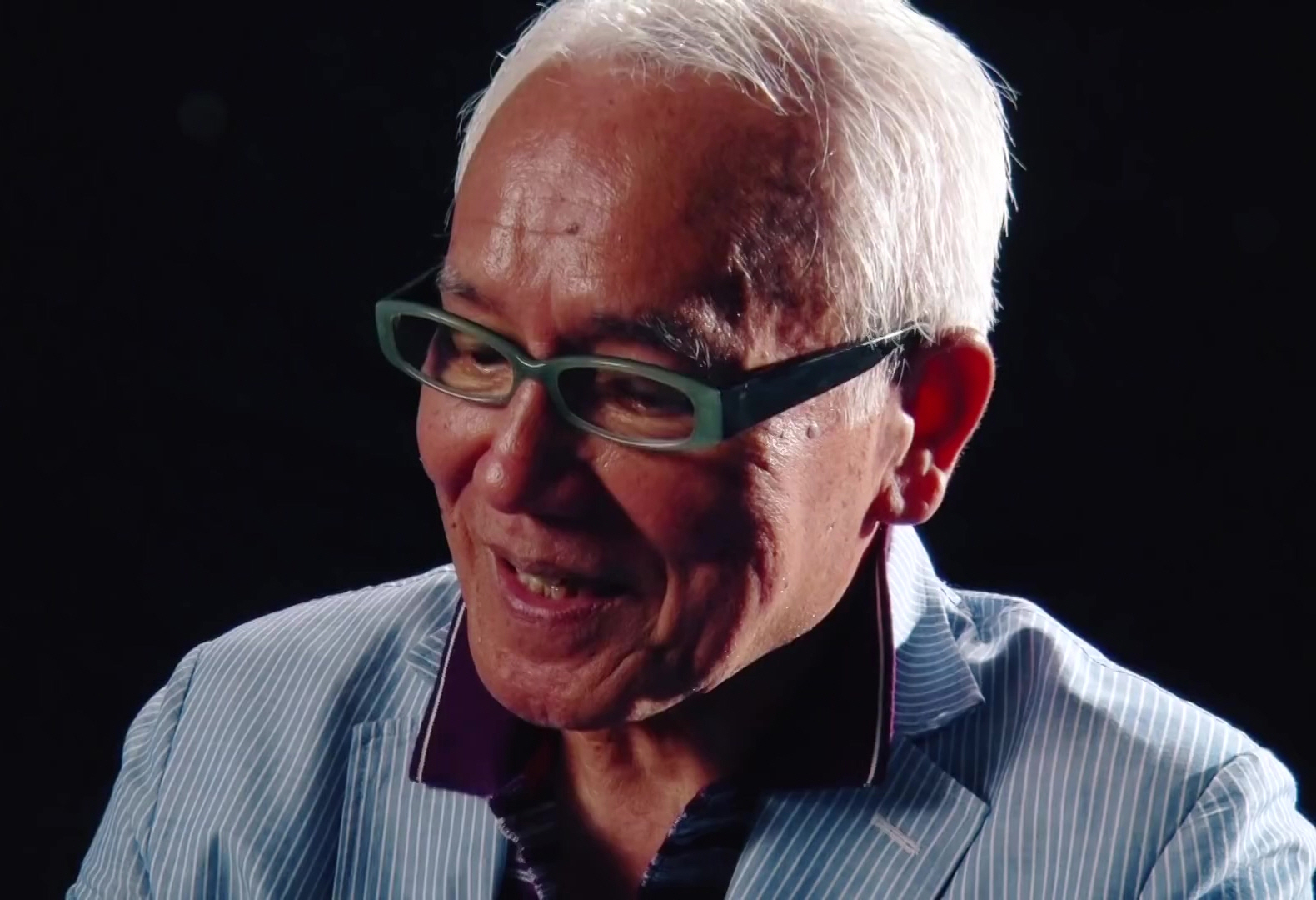
Susumu Kurobe circa 2016

According to Susumu Kurobe, during his time playing Hayata, he felt uncomfortable when wearing the SSSP uniform during shooting, especially when filming on location, but Hiroko Sakurai stated that she had no problem with it and even commented that the cast once went out to lunch while wearing the uniform. Despite his character Hayata and Ultraman being related, he never get a chance to perform together with Ultraman's suit actor Bin Furuya, as both recorded in their respective scenes (real life for Kurobe and special effects studio for Furuya). Kurobe himself has a daughter named Takami Yoshimoto (吉本 多香美, Yoshimoto Takami), whom played Rena Yanase, the secondary protagonist of Ultraman Tiga. Initially, Kurobe prevented his daughter from acting in the series but eventually gave her his blessing to do so. They both appeared together in the film Superior Ultraman 8 Brothers, with their characters likewise written as father and daughter. He has joked that the decision to have Hayata and Fuji married in the movie was a "mistake", as it made his wife "jealous". When asked who is his favorite Ultraman, Kurobe answered that it was Ultraman Zero. His favorite Ultra Monsters were Pigmon, Alien Baltan and Woo. If possible, Kurobe, Hiroko and Furuya wish to believe that Ultraman will surpass their lifetimes and hopes that Tsuburaya Productions will keep putting Ultraman in any form of media for all audiences worldwide to enjoy.

=== Popularity ===
Shin Hayata trying to transform with a curry spoon before switching to the Beta Capsule

One of the most popular jokes in Japanese culture is the scene from episode 34 of Ultraman, which involves Hayata mistaking a curry spoon for the Beta Capsule while hastily trying to transform and stop the monster Skydon from falling down to Earth. This scene was devised by Akio Jissoji, and while receiving complaints from Samaji Nonagase, another Ultraman director, the episode's high viewer ratings justified the work. Because of this, certain Japanese media (mostly in anime and manga) tends to reference an in-joke to the incident either by repeating the same mistake or simply using a pair of spoons to replicate Ultraman's eyes.

There is also a Mexican pro-wrestler Milo Ventura Chávez, whose alias during matches is Ultraman. His son is named Ultraman Jr. Although unrelated, another Mexican pro-wrestler Starman was previously known by the name Ultraman Jr. The defeat of Ultraman at the hands of Zetton in episode 39 of his series delivers a huge impact to the audiences, so much so that it served as inspirations for Japanese pro wrestlers Atsushi Onita and Akira Maeda in their career in hopes of "avenging the fallen hero".

In February 2007, a popular internet video called Omoide wa Okkusenman! simultaneously aired in Japan and quickly become a sensation. The song describes the singer reminiscing about his childhood and friends, particularly pretending to be Ultraman and Ultra Seven with them, while realizing his life and theirs is nothing like what it used to be. In September of the same year, Ultraman was the important guest of the year's Hugo Award ceremony. His design is presented in the year's Hugo Award, sculpted by Takashi Kinoshita of the world-famous model and figure company Kaiyodo Co., Ltd (ja:海洋堂). Ultraman was also the one who presented Steven Moffat, writer of "The Girl in the Fireplace" from series two of Doctor Who with the Hugo Award.

In 2006, a character popularity poll was launched in response to the 40th anniversary of the Ultra Series. Based on Oricon's list, Ultraman was placed first in the list in according to the total of voters. He is ranked first place in by female voters and second place by of male voters. Five years later on the Ultra Series' 45th anniversary, Ultraman was placed seventh in the popularity poll after losing to Zero, who scored the first place and ranked 11th in 2013 after losing to Ultraman Tiga.

Ultraman's Ultra-Act figure participated in a 2015 April Fool's Day joke, where P-Bandai announced the "release" of a 40 m scale of Ultraman's figure (which is Ultraman's own size). This was only during shown on said day and never revealed again afterwards.

=== Merchandise ===
Ultraman Milky, a result of a joint collaboration between Ultraman (right) and Fujiya Co.'s mascot Peko-chan (left), cosplaying as Ultraman

Having gained a long time popularity, Ultraman has also been featured in several promotions and merchandises, either by Tsuburaya Productions itself or by extension, a cross-promotion. The first one was a set of action figures from the Ultraman line sold by the Marusan toy company back in 1966, the same year the character and his series' debuted. Said toys were later displayed at the Yokohama Doll Museum on March 12 and 13, 2016 as part of the 50th anniversary of the Ultra Series celebration . Tsuburaya has also collaborated with Fujiya Co. twice; once in the 1990s where a chocolate confectionery was released alongside an Ultraman card and later in 2016 in a collaboration with Peko-chan, Fujiya Co.'s main mascot (from the milk confectionary Milky), as said company was celebrating its 65th anniversary, which served as a tie-in to the Ultra Series' 50th anniversary.

Ultraman's soft vinyl doll had been sold several times by Bandai since the 1990s. In 2010, Ultraman was given his first release as a highly articulated action figure in the ULTRA-ACT toyline. Following his temporary corruption into Ultraman Dark in Ultraman Ginga, both he and Ultra Seven Dark were released in 2014 as repainted versions of their original figures. To commemorate the 50th anniversary of the Ultra Series, Ultraman got his second release in July 2016 as a poseable action figure in the S.H. Figuarts line alongside two of his iconic enemies, Alien Baltan and Zetton.

In 2014, Ultraman and several of the Ultra Monsters from his series helped promote TOEIC to Japanese citizens, while being portrayed as a well-dressed businessman. A promotional video features him communicating with Dada while English subtitles are displayed. Ultraman helps the alien by giving him advise on how to start a business, but he confronts him after Dada's business plan turns out be an invasion of Earth.

In the fashion world, Ultraman is also a part of "A Man of Ultra", a branch of a fashion house with clothing themed after the Ultra Series. Ultraman himself had been present to promote the company's products, though sometimes the character is also accompanied by other characters of the Ultra Series, such as Ultra Seven and Ultraman Ace. On November 2, 2015, a special violin painted with the attributes of the Ultraman series was presented in a concert at the Tokyo Metropolitan Theatre Concert Hall and was sold to a lucky spectator at the price of 780,000 yen (US$6,428).

In a cross-promotion with the FamilyMart convenience store franchise, Ultraman and Alien Baltan were sold as Chinese steamed buns designed with their likeness. This was, however, sold to a limited date, starting from January 19, 2016.
