= Bin Furuya =

Japanese actor

- 古谷敏
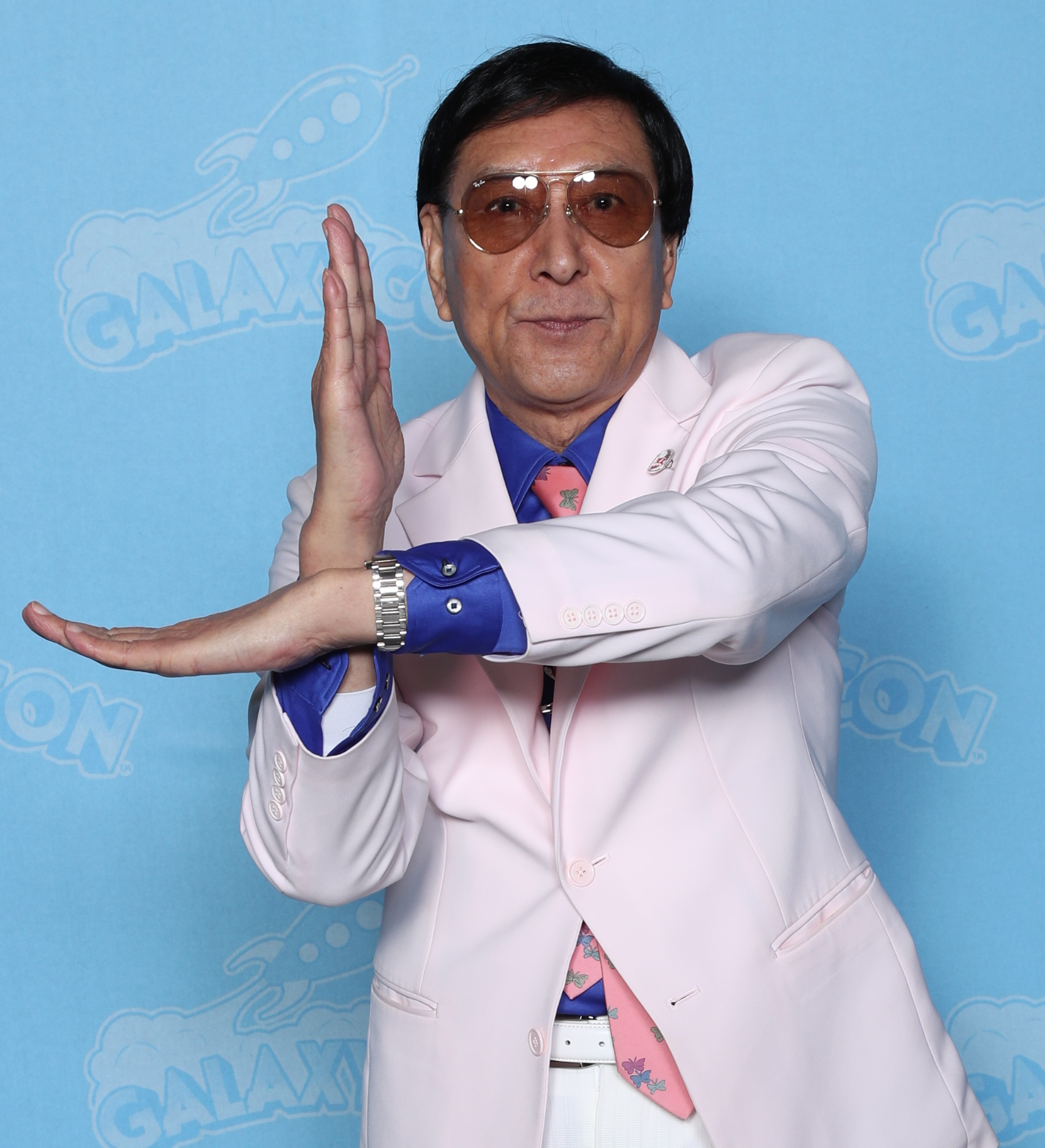
- Furuya at the 2019 GalaxyCon Louisville
- Born: Satoshi Furuya; July 5, 1943 (age 82); Nishiazabu, Minato, Tokyo, Japan
- Occupation: Actor
- Years active: 1961-present
- Known for: Ultraman
- Website: https://shinbin.jp/

Satoshi Furuya (古谷 敏(さとし), Furuya Satoshi), known professionally as Bin Furuya (古谷 敏(びん), Furuya Bin), is a Japanese actor best known for his portrayal of the title character in the 1966 series Ultraman. Furuya would later portray the character Amagi in the sequel series Ultraseven. Furuya has also made appearances in Mothra (1961), Gorath (1962), High and Low (1963), Ghidorah, the Three-Headed Monster (1964), Ultraman Zearth (1996), Mega Monster Battle: Ultra Galaxy (2009), and Shin Ultraman (2022).

== Life ==
Furuya was born in Nishiazabu, Minato, Tokyo, the fifth son of a door merchant. When he was young, he often went to watch movies at a nearby temple. After finishing middle school, Furuya studied acting at Toho Geino School. He was inspired by actors Akira Takarada and Yūjirō Ishihara to pursue a career in acting.

In 1960, he entered Toho. His first role in a motion picture was in the 1961 film Mothra. He began his career as a crowd actor for Toho.

At the age of 22, in 1966, Furuya was chosen for the role as a suit actor to portray an alien named Kemur in Ultra Q. His height at 181 cm (5 ft 11 in), slim body and body type "different from regular Japanese people in the 1960s" are said to have matched with the requirements for the role. At first, he refused to take the role because he was embarrassed to wear the costume, but gave in after being persuaded by the movie staff.

His Japanese-language autobiography, The Man Who Became Ultraman, was published in 2009.

== Filmography ==
=== Film ===
Year	Title	Role	Ref(s)
1961	Mothra	Infant Island dancer	
1961	The Last War	Kasagi Maru sailor	
1962	Gorath	Reporter at Antarctic Base	
1962	King Kong vs. Godzilla	JSDF correspondent	
1963	High and Low	Train Station employee / Drunk	
1963	Atragon	JSDF Soldier	
1964	Tiger Flight	Pilot	
1964	Mothra vs. Godzilla	Police Officer	
1964	You Can Succeed, Too	Towa Tourism employee	
1964	Dogora	JSDF Soldier	
1964	Ghidorah, the Three-Headed Monster	Researcher / Matsumoto Evacuee / Observation Platform Tourist / Police Officer	
1965	Frankenstein Conquers the World	Man in Okayama Crowd	
1965	The Crazy Adventure	Weekly Top Reporter / Guest at Club Sahara / Man at Hotel Meriken	
1965	Invasion of Astro-Monster	Xilien	
1966	The War of the Gargantuas	Coast Guard Official	
1979	Ultraman	Ultraman	
2008	Monster X Strikes Back: Attack the G8 Summit	Officer Takamine	
2009	Mega Monster Battle: Ultra Galaxy	Inhabitant of the Land of Light	
2013	The Intermission	Member of the cinema audience	
2014	Earth Defense Widow	Yanagi	
2016	Kaiju Mono	Defense Minister Yukio Kamikura	
2018	The Great Buddha Arrival	Kazuyoshi Edamasa	
2021	Nezura 1964	Oyaji	
2022	Shin Ultraman	Ultraman (motion capture)	

=== Television ===
Year	Title	Role	Ref(s)
1966	Ultra Q	Guy in Crowd [episode 4] / Kemur Man [episode 19] / Ragon [episode 20] / Hachi [episode 24]	
1966	Ultraman	Ultraman	
1967	Ultraseven	Amagi	
2011	Ultra Zone	Akio [episode 12]	
2024	The Tiger and Her Wings	Takekichi Wakashima	
