= Air sex =

Simulated sex with an invisible partner

Air sex is a performance activity invented in Japan; clothed men and women simulate sexual activity with an invisible partner, often in an exaggerated manner, set to music, and in a competition before an audience. This is somewhat akin to playing air guitar, explaining the name. The creator, J-Taro Sugisaku, says that it was invented in Tokyo in 2006 by a group of bored men without girlfriends.

A report about the phenomenon in the Japanese magazine Weekly Playboy in 2006 was picked up by the English language web site Mainichi Daily News. A video of the air sex "world championship" was uploaded to YouTube in January 2007. This was followed by a segment of the BBC Three documentary show Japanorama in March 2007, subsequently uploaded to YouTube and flagged as "inappropriate for some users".

These videos led to coverage in the blogosphere. The Japanorama video was shown in May 2007 at the JACON 2007 convention in Orlando, Florida, and a spontaneous air sex competition ensued, footage of which also found its way to YouTube.

In late January and early February 2007, a group of American black male teenagers calling themselves "Peer Pressure" produced two videos showing air sex set to music, published on YouTube under the user name "amp6". Fleshbot called these "The Best Air Sex Video of All Time".

Since August 2007, The Alamo Drafthouse has been holding bimonthly Air Sex competitions in the US. In June 2009 The Alamo Drafthouse toured the country on the Air Sex World Championships tour crowning Air Sex Champions in 14 cities. Later that October the first ever world champion was crowned when Shanghai Slammer from Los Angeles out-performed every other city champion. The tour was hosted by comedian Chris Trew. In October 2010 the group was scheduled to tour once more. Photos are posted on the Alamo Drafthouse Flickr page.
