= Segata Sanshiro =

Advertising character for the Sega Saturn

Hiroshi Fujioka as Segata Sanshiro

Segata Sanshiro (Japanese: せがた三四郎, Hepburn: Segata Sanshirō) is a character created by Sega to advertise the Sega Saturn in Japan between 1997 and 1998. He is a parody of Sugata Sanshirō, a legendary judo fighter from Akira Kurosawa's 1943 film Sanshiro Sugata. In television and radio advertisements, Segata Sanshiro is portrayed by actor Hiroshi Fujioka. He was positioned as a martial artist who commanded people to play Sega Saturn games.

The advertising campaign began in 1997, with the Saturn having a modest level of success in Japan at that point. Fujioka was impressed by Sega's ideas for the character and felt that Segata Sanshiro would send a strong message to children. Advertisements continued both on television and on radio until 1999. As a result of the advertisements, Segata Sanshiro's theme song became a CD single and he was made the main character of his own video game, Segata Sanshirō Shinken Yūgi.

Segata Sanshiro has also had cameo appearances in video games, a comic book and a live concert. He has retained a cult following in Japan and has been credited with helping improve Saturn sales there. Western journalists have praised the appeal and advertising prowess of the character.

== Advertising campaign ==
Sega's advertising campaign with Segata Sanshiro began in the summer of 1997, more than two years after the Japanese release of the Sega Saturn. At that time, the Saturn was moderately successful in Japan. Hiroshi Fujioka, an actor famous for starring in Kamen Rider, was selected to play the role in advertisements. The character of Segata Sanshiro was a parody of Sugata Sanshirō, a legendary judo fighter from Akira Kurosawa's film Sanshiro Sugata. In part because Fujioka bore a vague resemblance to Susumu Fujita, the actor who portrayed Sugata Sanshirō, the parody was obvious to a Japanese public audience. Fujioka was also a skilled martial artist, experienced in multiple disciplines including karate, iaido, and judo, making him a close fit for the role. The character of Segata Sanshiro was positioned as a martial artist who commanded people to play Sega Saturn games. His name sounds similar to his catchphrase in Japanese, "Play Sega Saturn!" (セガサターン、シロ!, Sega Satān, shiro!), as well as "Sega Saturn, White" (セガサターン、白, Sega Satān, Shiro), a reference to the white color model of the Japanese Sega Saturn which followed the original gray version. According to Fujioka, he did give input on the character and contributed ideas. Fujioka was impressed by Sega's ideas for the character, stating "I thought it was good that they wanted to send a strong message to children in an age when young people had no direction."

“This is Hiroshi Fujioka, Segata Sanshiro. All of you students who are preparing for exams, soon you will be on the home stretch. Resist the urge to play Sega Saturn. Those of you who like games, resisting games may be painful, but your future prospects are precious. That's why you should resist games and focus on your studies. It's difficult for me to say this, but when spring comes, you will be free to play… Play Sega Saturn.“

— Hiroshi Fujioka as Segata Sanshiro, Radio advertisement, Winter 1997

The first television advertisement featuring Segata Sanshiro aired on November 28, 1997, promoting Sonic R. Television advertisements would continue from 1997 to 1999 and would feature Segata in real life scenarios related thematically with the game being advertised. In the advertisement for Burning Rangers, Segata rescued a woman inside a burning building, while the advertisement for Winter Heat featured him racing a speed skater on foot across ice. Other games advertised include Panzer Dragoon Saga, Shining Force III, Saturn Bomberman Fight!!, The House of the Dead, Deep Fear, and Dragon Force II.

In addition to television, Fujioka also recorded radio advertisements in support of the console. During production, Fujioka maintained a very serious focus on his performance of the character, even while doing tasks such as breaking ten roof tiles with his head or punching the buttons of a giant Saturn controller. In playing the role, Fujioka stated that he felt strongly he was doing work that would be a positive influence on society, and that he did actually enjoy Sega Saturn games and felt "they put out a message to the world."

As part of the television advertisements, Segata Sanshiro's theme song, "Sega Satān, shiro!", was played. The song was written by Koji Ando, composed and arranged by Fumio Okui, and performed by Ichiro Tomita. As Segata gained popularity, the theme song became popular enough to warrant the recording of a CD single. Fujioka recorded this version himself, having previously sang the theme song for Kamen Rider, "Let's Go!! Rider Kick", for its first thirteen episodes as well as a few singles between 1971 and 1985. In addition to the CD, Fujioka also made several appearances as Segata Sanshiro at promotional events. Segata's popularity also led to the release of a Saturn game, Segata Sanshirō Shinken Yūgi, on October 29, 1998. At the end of 1998, the launch of Sega's next video game console, the Dreamcast, was approaching and Saturn development was slowing down. Segata Sanshiro was in one last advertisement, leaping from the roof of Sega's headquarters to save Sega employees from an incoming missile launched at the building by a criminal presumed to be working for a rival company. Segata then rode the missile into space, presumably being killed in the process.

In 2020, Sega began a campaign starring Segata Sanshiro's son, Sega Shiro, in celebration of the company's 60th anniversary. The character is played by Fujioka's son, Maito Fujioka. As part of the commercials, Shiro confronts a rival, "Sega Hatan Shiro", who is later revealed to be Segata Sanshiro in disguise.

== Later appearances ==
Fujioka appeared as Segata at the official launch of the Dreamcast, as well as in a one-off appearance on Fuji TV at the end of 1999. The character would later appear in Issue 269 of Sonic the Hedgehog from Archie Comics, in which he faced Sonic the Hedgehog in a fighting tournament inspired by the game Sonic the Fighters. Segata Sanshiro also has an appearance in Rent A Hero No. 1, a Japanese game released on both the Dreamcast and Xbox. He serves as a martial arts instructor who can teach new moves to the main character. He makes a cameo appearance in Sonic & All-Stars Racing Transformed, and is playable in Project X Zone 2 as a solo unit. Producer Kensuke Tsukanaka stated that it was a desire of Namco Bandai to include Segata Sanshiro in the latter game. Fujioka returned as Segata in 2013 at a live concert thrown by Sega, and spoke to the crowd with Sega advertising producer Koji Ando about making the Segata Sanshiro commercials.

== Segata Sanshirō Shinken Yūgi ==
Segata Sanshirō Shinken Yūgi (せがた三四郎 真剣遊戯) is a Sega Saturn video game based on the Segata Sanshiro advertisements. This game is a collection of minigames, with completing objectives in each one unlocking one of Segata's television commercials for view. In one such minigame, Segata acts as Santa Claus and delivers presents to children while avoiding obstacles, while another was a game in the style of Columns with combos earned helping to keep Segata from drowning. Completing all ten of the minigames earns a message from Segata, as well as a music video. Gamers' Republic Magazine gave the game an "F" rating, saying that the mini games are lame, and it would only be enjoyable if you got the game for free and enjoyed the character.

Retrospectively, Segata Sanshirō Shinken Yūgi is remembered for having captured the spirit of Segata Sanshiro and having a sense of humor consistent with the character but criticized for its simplicity and lack of engaging play. According to Brian Crimmins of Hardcore Gaming 101, "Sanshiro's antic may not have offered Sega enough to work on, but more importantly, the developer didn't consider what role play can have in facilitating humor... this is exactly the case with Shinken Yūgi: despite how consistent the humor is, the quality of the games themselves varies wildly." Crimmins also commented, however, that Shinken Yūgi's best value was historical. When GamesTM interviewed Fujioka, they noted his reaction about the game indicated that he was happy that it was developed, but also aware that it was not of good quality.

== Legacy ==
The Sega Saturn sold 5.75 million units in Japan, surpassing the 3.58 million units of its predecessor, the Mega Drive, in the country. This amount of sales also surpassed Nintendo's sales of 5.54 million units of the competitor Nintendo 64 and competed closely with Sony's PlayStation. The Segata Sanshiro advertisements are given credit for helping to establish those sales, though Sega had failed to make the Saturn as successful in other regions. As a result of the campaign, Segata Sanshiro achieved a cult following in Japan.

Nintendo Power journalist Steve Thomason singled out Segata as the character he would most like to control in the Nintendo DSi game Photo Dojo. Thomason amended that "it's just a shame his greatest skill – throwing opponents to make them explode – couldn't be translated to the game". Luke Plunkett of Kotaku called Segata the "Greatest Video Game Ad Man Of Them All" due to his strong personality citing examples such as how he yelled at children. Otaku USA referred to Segata as "the man, the myth, the legend" and praised his return in a concert from 2013. GamesTM noted the appeal of commercials was his "hyper-dramatic reality in which Segata had scope to be active and heroic". Justin Towell of GamesRadar+ also liked the character but felt disappointed by how he stopped appearing in advertisements. Kevin Schiller of Game Revolution referred to Segata as one of the strongest points of Project X Zone 2.

In 2012, Steve Lycett, executive producer of Sumo Digital, encouraged a fan-made poll on the SEGA Forums to determine which three SEGA characters the fans would like to see in Sonic & All-Stars Racing Transformed as downloadable content. Out of the 28 SEGA characters chosen by the forum, Ryo Hazuki had the majority vote ranking 1st, while Hatsune Miku ranked 2nd, and Segata Sanshiro ranked 3rd. In a review of Sonic & All-Stars Racing Transformed, Martin Robinson of Eurogamer had expected to see Segata in the game given its multiple tributes to various Sega games.
