= Kabuto-O Beetle =

- Cover of the DVD release of Kabuto-O Bettle
- Directed by: Minoru Kawasaki
- Written by: Go Nagai; Takao Nakano
- Produced by: Reo Anzai; Minoru Kawasaki; Hiroyuki Yamada
- Starring: Kabuto-o Beetle; Super Delfin; Ebessan; Masami Horiuchi; Jushin Thunder Liger; Yakan Nabe; Shoko Nakagawa; Torata Nanbu; Kaori Ohara; Billy Robinson; Takumi Saito
- Cinematography: Yasutaka Nagano
- Distributed by: Imagica; Twin
- Release date: July 16, 2005
- Running time: 70 minutes
- Country: Japan
- Language: Japanese

Kabuto-O Beetle (兜王ビートル, Kabuto-Ou Bitoru) translated as Beetle, the Horn King is a 2005 Japanese film directed by Minoru Kawasaki. The film, from an original story by Go Nagai and a screenplay by Takao Nakano, is based on the character of the same name created by Nagai for Osaka Pro-Wrestling (Ōsaka Puroresu).
