= Kaiju Mono =

- Theatrical release poster

Japanese name
- Kanji: 大怪獣モノ
Transcriptions
- Revised Hepburn: Daikaijū Mono
- Directed by: Minoru Kawasaki
- Written by: Takao Nakano; Minoru Kawasaki
- Produced by: Yukihiko Yamaguchi; Kazutaka Sekiya; Minoru Kawasaki
- Starring: Kota Ibushi
- Cinematography: Makoto Matsuo
- Edited by: Kentaro Hitomi
- Music by: Ryo Nakamura
- Production companies: King Records; River Top
- Distributed by: ARC Films
- Release date: July 16, 2016
- Running time: 93 minutes
- Country: Japan
- Language: Japanese

Kaiju Mono (Japanese: 大怪獣モノ, Hepburn: Daikaijū Mono; lit. 'Giant Monster Mono') is a 2016 Japanese kaiju film directed by Minoru Kawasaki.

== Plot ==
A giant monster appears from the ground, after the eruption of Mt. Myojin. In the meantime, the Japanese government asks for help from a scientist who goes by the name of Dr. Saigo and his daughter Miwa. Both work at the Institute of Super Physics and Chemistry and were once ousted from the academic world on suspicions of forging materials concerning what the two scientist announces to be a universal cell known as "Setap X". Upon using Setap X, Dr. Saigo transforms his assistant, Hideto Nitta, into a giant professional wrestler with a height of 40 meters. The latter challenges the monster from Mt Myojin, named Mono by the members of a Kaiju organisation.

== Cast ==
- Kota Ibushi as Hideto Nitta (after Injection)
- Syuusuke Saito as Hideto Nitta (before Injection)
- Minoru Suzuki as Evil Nitta
- Ryu Manatsu as Professor Jotaro Saigo
- Hiroyuki Taniguchi as Daikaiju Mono
- Eiji Ukulele as Vice-Minister Shuichi Oda
- Shinzō Hotta as Professor Nindo Izumi
- Miki Kawanishi as Miwa Saigo
- Saki Akai as Lisa / Scorpio
- Fuyuki Moto
- Mitsuko Hoshi
- Eiichi Kikuchi as Deputy Defense Secretary Wataru Hashimoto
- Bin Furuya as Defense Minister Yukio Kamikura
- Sandayu Dokumamushi
- Yasuhiko Saijo
