= Eiichi Kikuchi =

Japanese actor (born 1942)

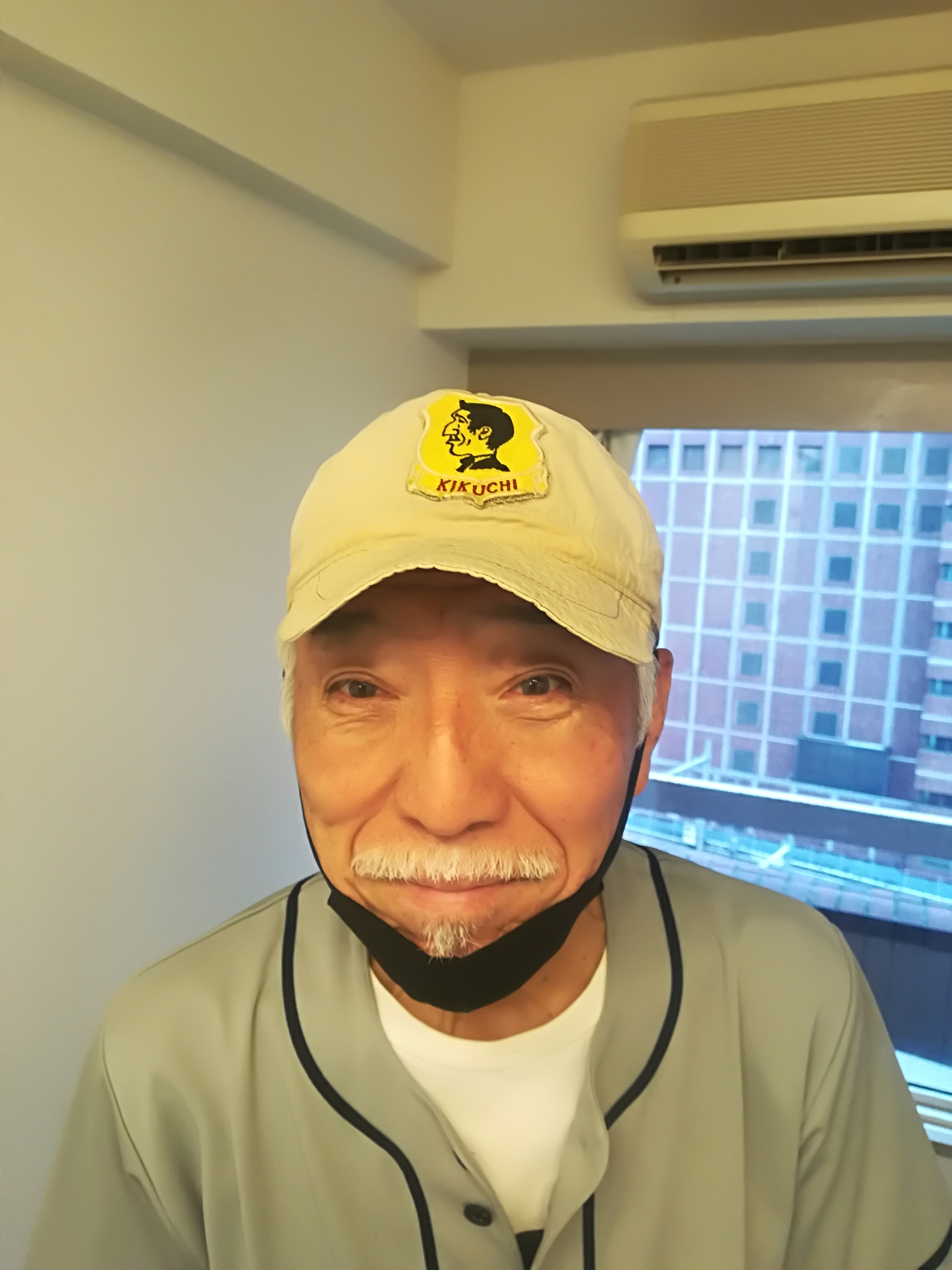
- Eiichi Kikuchi 2022
- Born: August 21, 1942 (age 84); Tokyo, Japan
- Education: Nihon University College of Art
- Occupations: Actor; voiceover artist
- Years active: 1964–present

Eiichi Kikuchi (きくち 英一, Kikuchi Eiichi)（real/former name in kanji: 菊池 英一) (born August 21, 1942, in Tokyo Metropolis) is a Japanese actor. He has appeared in several episodes of the Ultra Series.

== TV ==
- Ambassador Magma (1966-1967)
- Ultra Seven (1967-1968) - Ultra Seven
- Fight! Mighty Jack
- Return of Ultraman (1971) - Ultraman Jack / Zazahn / MAT Communication Worker
- Kaiketsu Lion-Maru
- Ultraman Ace
- Ultraman Taro
- Denjin Zaborger
- J.A.K.Q. Dengekitai
- Spider-Man (tokusatsu)
- Battle Fever J
- Ultraman 80
- Dai Sentai Goggle V (1982-1983, 15 episodes) - Dr. Iguana
- Kyojuu Tokusou Juspion (1985, Episodes 25 & 26) - Gazami brother #1
- Gridman the Hyper Agent
- Ultraman Dyna
- Ultraman Nexus
- Ultraman Mebius (2006) - President of the Kikuchi Electric Appliances Company

== Films ==
- You Only Live Twice (1967) - Knife Assassin (uncredited)
- Number Ten Blues (1975)
- The Monster X Strikes Back/Attack the G8 Summit (2008)
- Executive Koala (2005)
