= Monster Seafood Wars =

- Theatrical release poster

Japanese name
- Kanji: 三大怪獣グルメ
Transcriptions
- Revised Hepburn: San Daikaijū Gurume
- Directed by: Minoru Kawasaki
- Screenplay by: Masakazu Migita
- Based on: An unmade film proposed by Eiji Tsuburaya
- Produced by: Minoru Kawasaki; Saguma Shinichi
- Starring: Eiichi Kikuchi
- Cinematography: Makoto Matsuo
- Edited by: Yuta Kawasaki
- Music by: Asaka Kougi
- Production companies: Dentsu; Takeshobo; Mobacon; Pal Entertainments; Rivertop
- Distributed by: Pal Entertainments
- Release date: June 6, 2020
- Running time: 84 minutes
- Country: Japan
- Language: Japanese
- Budget: ¥20 million

Monster Seafood Wars (Japanese: 三大怪獣グルメ, Hepburn: San Daikaijū Gurume; lit. 'Three Monsters Gourmet') is a 2020 Japanese kaiju film directed by Minoru Kawasaki. The film is loosely based on an unmade film featuring a giant octopus proposed by Eiji Tsuburaya prior to production of the original 1954 Godzilla film.

== Plot ==
Yuta Tanuma, a former member of the Institute for Super Physics and Chemistry, was dismissed during the development of a powerful drug that enlarges living things, and is currently helping his parents' sushi restaurant. Meanwhile, a giant squid and a giant octopus suddenly appear in Tokyo. Hibiki, a government-organized seafood monster attack unit (SMAT) commander, invited Yuta to SMAT.

SMAT introduces a new weapon "vinegar cannon" to challenge the three major monsters. However, because the monster meat that was cut off by the attack was delicious, a "monster meat boom" occurred in the world.

== Cast ==
- Eiichi Kikuchi as Minoru Hotta
- Yûya Asato as Shinjiro Hikoma
- Ayano Yoshida Christie as Nana Hoshiyama
- Hide Fukumoto as Prime Minister Ube
- Ryô Kinomoto
- Masayuki Kusumi

== Release ==
=== Theatrical ===
Monster Seafood Wars was released in Japan on June 6, 2020.

=== Home media ===
The film was released in the United States by SRS Cinema on VHS and Blu-ray in April 2021.
