= Masami Horiuchi =

Japanese actor (born 1950)

Masami Horiuchi (Japanese: 堀内 正美, Hepburn: Horiuchi Masami; born March 22, 1950 in Tokyo, Japan) is a Japanese actor.

== Filmography ==
=== Television ===
- Shiroi Kyotō (1978) – Taniyama
- Tokugawa Ieyasu (1983) – Kobayakawa Hideaki
- Sanada Taiheiki (1985) - Toyotomi Hidetsugu
- Byakkotai (1986) – Sanjō Sanetomi
- Kamen Rider Drive (2014) – Freeze/Soichi Makage
- Gunshi Kanbei (2014) – Yoshida Kanemi
- Segodon (2018) – Itakura Katsukiyo
- Nemuri Kyōshirō The Final (2018) - Mizuno Echizennokami
- Reach Beyond the Blue Sky (2021) – Nakayama Tadayasu
- Laughing Matryoshka (2024) - Masashige Komatsu
- Unbound (2025) - Shirokiya Hikotaro

=== Film ===
- The Summer of the Ubume (2005) – Hiroyuki Sugano
- Ajin: Demi-Human (2017)
- Last Winter, We Parted (2018)
- True Mothers (2020)
- Bolt (2020)
- The Voice of Sin (2020)
- Nobutora (2021)
- Ware Yowakereba: Yajima Kajiko-den (2022)
- School Lunch of Ashiya City (2022) – Tadao Murakami
- Shin Ultraman (2022)
- My Mom, My Angel: A Journey of Love and Acceptance (2024)
