= Nihon Igai Zenbu Chinbotsu =

- DVD cover
- Directed by: Minoru Kawasaki
- Written by: Yasutaka Tsutsui (novel); Masazaku Migita
- Produced by: Daisuke Niki; Masanobu Suzuki
- Starring: Kenji Kohashi; Shuuji Kashiwabara; Masatoshi Matsuo
- Release date: September 2, 2006 (Japan)
- Running time: 98 minutes
- Country: Japan
- Language: Japanese

Nihon Igai Zenbu Chinbotsu (Japanese: 日本以外全部沈没; lit. 'Everything Other than Japan Sinks') is a 2006 Japanese black comedy film directed by Minoru Kawasaki, as a parody of the 2006 film Sinking of Japan.

It is based on the 1973 short story of the same name by Yasutaka Tsutsui (a parody of the novel Japan Sinks, released the same year), which criticizes nationalism and racism. It also describes humans as powerless against disaster.

== Plot ==
In 2011 the greatest tectonic disaster in history occurs. As a result of catastrophic earthquakes, massive volcanic eruptions, and huge tsunamis, North and South America, Eurasia, Africa, Indonesia and Australia sink underwater while the Japanese islands remain untouched, thanks to the Chinese land which has sunk and gone underneath them.

Japan suddenly discovers that it is the destination for all the world's surviving refugees. Consequently, they are all forced to make uncomfortable adjustments in order to share the world's last habitable landmass. However, they finally discover that the Japanese islands will eventually sink as well since the Chinese land supporting them is moving rapidly towards the Pacific Ocean. At this time, the leaders of various countries, including North Korea, huddle in the darkness with a small candlelight and, finally make a short-term peace shortly before Japan sinks (one of the characters tells a rhyme about the mitten and the animals who wanted to stay there). In the end, Japan is submerged beneath the Pacific Ocean, humanity is rendered extinct, and Earth becomes an ocean planet, with no remaining land in sight.

== Production ==
Yasutaka Tsutsui (author of the short story) makes an appearance in the film.

== Reception ==
A retrospective review states: "It may be nonsense, but The World Sinks Except Japan is at least as credible as The Day After Tomorrow. Kawasaki and his co-screenwriter Masakazu Migita have fun with stereotypes and nationalist sentiments, but the main characters play their roles fairly straight."

Another review comments on the film's message: "There are no heroics to be found here, and no heart-warming message about triumph in the face of adversity, which means it's much less nauseating than the film it satirises - and generally more satisfying." A positive review on Asianfeast.org states that the film is entertaining and that it will provoke irresistible laughter.

A very mixed review, after noting the absence of the monsters that are usually featured in recent Kawasaki films, praises the general political approach of the film but finds the overall production of poor quality.

The Japanese film critic Yuichi Maedaa, in his very negative review of the film, characterises it as "silly", "cheap" and "shallow", among other things.

The film was also noted for its sarcastic portrayal of Shintaro Ishihara easily identifiable in the character of Shinsaburô Ishiyama, Japanese Minister of Defence invariably replying "No!" to all foreign requests.
