= The Calamari Wrestler =

The Calamari Wrestler /Ika resuraa
- Directed by: Minoru Kawasaki
- Written by: Minoru Kawasaki; Masazaku Migita
- Produced by: Shuntaro Kanai
- Starring: Miho Shiraishi; Osamu Nishimura; Akira Nogami; Yoshihiro Takayama
- Cinematography: Minoru Kawasaki
- Edited by: Minoru Kawasaki
- Production company: Imagica Corp.
- Distributed by: Klock Worx Co.
- Release date: July 30, 2004
- Running time: 95 minutes
- Country: Japan
- Languages: English; Japanese

The Calamari Wrestler (いかレスラー, Ika resuraa) is a 2004 Japanese film by director Minoru Kawasaki, starring Kana Ishida and Osamu Nishimura.

== Plot ==
The plot revolves around a professional wrestler who, after developing a terminal illness, becomes a giant squid-like creature (Osamu Nishimura). As a giant squid, he must battle to reclaim his former life both inside and outside the ring.

== Cast ==
- Kana Ishida as Miyako
- Osamu Nishimura as Kanichi Iwata/The Calamari Wrestler
- Akira Nogami as Koji Taguchi/The Octopus Wrestler
- Hirohisa Nakata as Godozan/The Squilla Boxer
- Miho Shiraishi as Sister
- Yoshihiro Takayama as himself
- Hariken Ryu as Calamari Wrestler's suit actor

== Reception ==
Jeannett Catsoulis of The New York Times described the film as goofy and bizarre "yet surprisingly coherent" with "a good-natured charm." Catsoulis commented on the themes of the film noting a "convincing parallel between the anxieties of post-World War II Japan and what the film calls the "utter chaos" of the country today."
