= Minoru Kawasaki (director) =

Japanese filmmaker

- 河崎実
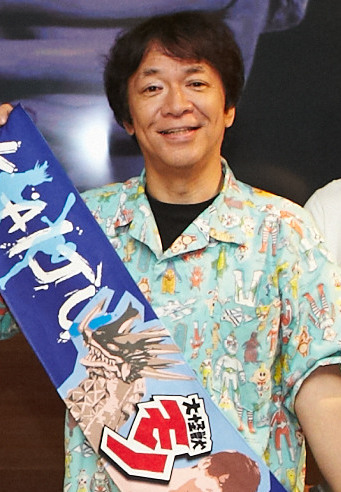
- Born: August 15, 1958 (age 67); Tokyo, Japan
- Education: Meiji University
- Occupations: Film director; film producer; screenwriter
- Years active: 1983–present

Minoru Kawasaki (河崎実), born 15 August 1958, is a Japanese filmmaker, best known for low-budget parody films featuring surreal humour and traditional practical effects.

Kawasaki began his career with mostly self-financed work, including the Den-Ace short films, featuring a parody of kyodai-style Japanese superheroes, before working on Tsuburaya Production's Ultraman Tiga (1996-1997). He had his first hit with The Calamari Wrestler (2004), about a wrestler who inexplicably becomes a giant squid. He followed this up with Executive Koala (2005), about an anthropomorphic koala salaryman who may or may not have murdered his wife, and Kabuto-O Beetle (also 2005), another wrestling-themed movie, this time with a giant stag beetle. In 2006, he released The World Sinks Except Japan, a spoof of Shinji Higuchi's remake of Japan Sinks, and Crab Goalkeeper (also 2006), a film Kawasaki describes as being his Forrest Gump (1994).

Kawasaki has also directed 2008's Monster X Strikes Back: Attack the G8 Summit, a sequel to the 1967 Shochiku kaiju film The X from Outer Space. While the original, made during the height of Japan's "Kaiju Boom" (1966–1967), is "played straight", the sequel is another parody. Kawasaki has since directed two more kaiju films: Kaiju Mono (2016) and Monster Seafood Wars (2020).

== Filmography ==
=== As director ===
- The Calamari Wrestler (2004)
- Kabuto-O Beetle (2005)
- Executive Koala (2005)
- Crab Goalkeeper (2006)
- The World Sinks Except Japan (2006)
- The Rug Cop (2006)
- Monster X Strikes Back: Attack the G8 Summit (2008)
- Pussy Soup (猫ラーメン大将, Neko Ramen Taishō) (2008)
- Outer Man (2015)
- Kaiju Mono (2016)
- Monster Seafood Wars (2020)
- Planet Prince 2021 (2021)
