= SciFi Japan TV =

- Title card
- Also known as: SFJtv
- Genre: Documentary
- Written by: Jim M. Ballard
- Directed by: JR Lipartito
- Narrated by: Jim M. Ballard, Justin Potts, Bob Werley, Thomas Vanderhyde
- Theme music composer: Fourth Vision
- Country of origin: Japan
- Original languages: English, Japanese
- No. of episodes: 39

Production
- Executive producers: Keith Aiken, Bob Johnson
- Producers: JR Lipartito, Jim M. Ballard
- Production locations: Tokyo, Japan, Yamagata, Japan, Kanagawa, Japan
- Editors: Jim M. Ballard, JR Lipartito
- Running time: 5–10 minutes
- Production company: ACTV Japan

Original release
- Network: YouTube
- Release: August 10, 2012 – present

SciFi Japan TV (サイファイ・ジャパン・ティービー, Sai Fai Japan Terībī) (abbreviated SFJtv) was a streaming television series of documentaries revolving around Japanese kaiju and tokusatsu movies. The show was shot on location in Japan and generally featured interviews with filmmakers and movie-related events. Every episode was released bilingually for both Japanese- and English-speaking audiences.

The main series began in August 2012 and ended in December 2014, followed by the occasional special episode. It was produced by ACTV Japan (formerly under the "Gaijin Channel" brand until episode 13) in Tokyo, Japan, for the American website SciFi JAPAN.

== Episodes ==
No.	English title	Japanese Title	Subject(s)	Original release date
1	"Ultraman Max Producer"	ウルトラマンマックスのプロデューサー	Takeshi Yagi, Ultraman	August 10, 2012
2	"Tokusatsu Museum"	特撮博物館	Hideaki Anno, Shinji Higuchi, Toshio Suzuki	August 24, 2012
VLOG–01	"Meeting Godzilla"	ビデオブログ「酒田市でゴジラと会う」	Haruo Nakajima	September 8, 2012
3	"The Man Who Became Godzilla"	ゴジラになった男	Haruo Nakajima	September 14, 2012
4	"Ultraman Saga FX Director"	ウルトラマンサーガの特技監督	Toshio Miike	September 28, 2012
5	"Independent Kaiju Movie Maker"	大怪獣自主映画の監督	Kiyotaka Taguchi	October 17, 2012
6	"1970's Godzilla FX Director - PART I"	７０年代のゴジラの特技監督〜第１部	Teruyoshi Nakano	October 31, 2012
7	"1970's Godzilla FX Director - PART II"	７０年代のゴジラの特技監督〜第２部	Teruyoshi Nakano	November 28, 2012
8	"Matt Frank Comes To Tokyo!"	マット・フランクが東京へ！	Matt Frank, Shinichi Wakasa, Tsutomu Kitagawa, Takeshi Yagi	December 19, 2012
9	"Godzilla and His Maker"	ゴジラと彼の創造者	Shinichi Wakasa, Tsutomu Kitagawa	January 22, 2013
10	"Art of Godzilla: Yasuyuki Inoue Tribute"	ゴジラの美実〜井上泰幸の追悼	Yasuyuki Inoue, Toshio Miike, Toshiro Aoki, Hiromasa Shirai, Jiro Shirasaki	February 19, 2013
11	"Memories of Godzilla"	ゴジラの思い出	Akira Takarada, Ryuuji Honda	March 28, 2013
12	"Ultraman in America!"	ウルトラマンがアメリカへ！	Susumu Kurobe, Hiroko Sakurai, Bin Furuya	July 11, 2013
13	"Anime x Tokusatsu: The Big O"	アニメx特撮：THEビッグオー	Kazuyoshi Katayama	August 30, 2013
14	"Heisei Ultraman Revival"	平成ウルトラマンのリバイバル	Takeshi Yagi, Yoshihiko Marutani	October 2, 2013
15	"City of Monsters"	怪獣たちの町	Godzilla	November 3, 2013
16	"Zombie TV"	ゾンビTV	Yoshihiro Nishimura, Naoya Tashiro, Maelie Makuno	December 22, 2013
17	"Godz-illustrator"	ゴジラストレーター	Yuji Kaida	June 2, 2014
18	"Tokyo Toy Show 2014"	東京おもちゃショー2014	TBA	July 3, 2014
19	"Kaiju Bar"	怪獣酒場	Ultraman	July 10, 2014
20	"Godzilla in Yokosuka"	ゴジラが横須賀へ！	Haruo Nakajima, Godzilla (2014)	July 17, 2014
20EX	"EXTRA: Godzilla in Yokosuka"	EXTRA・ゴジラが横須賀へ！	Haruo Nakajima, Godzilla (2014)	July 24, 2014
21	"Best of Godzilla"	ベスト・オブ・ゴジラ	Shiro Sano, Naoki Urasawa, Tsukasa Kotobuki, Nobuaki Kakuda	July 31, 2014
22	"Wonder Festival – Summer 2014"	ワンダーフェスティバル2014[夏]	Godzilla, Ultraman, Gamera	August 7, 2014
23	"Ultraman Festival 2014"	ウルトラマンフェスティバル2014	Ultraman	August 14, 2014
24	"Tokyo Toy Shopping"	怪獣買いもの	Godzilla	August 21, 2014
25	"First Look at "Hail to the King""	ドキュメンタリー『HAIL TO THE KING』予告	Godzilla	August 28, 2014
26	"Smog Monster Director"	ゴジラ対ヘドラ』の監督	Yoshimitsu Banno, Godzilla vs. Hedorah, Godzilla (2014)	September 4, 2014
26EX	"EXTRA: Smog Monster Director (20 Minute Edition)"	ゴジラ対ヘドラ』の監督～EXTRA～	Yoshimitsu Banno, Godzilla vs. Hedorah, Godzilla (2014)	September 11, 2014
27	"Tokyo SOS Director"	東京SOSの監督	Masaaki Tezuka, Godzilla vs. Megaguirus, Godzilla Against Mechagodzilla, Godzilla: Tokyo S.O.S.	September 18, 2014
27EX	"EXTRA: Tokyo SOS Director (30 Minute Edition)"	東京SOSの監督～EXTRA～	Masaaki Tezuka, Godzilla vs. Megaguirus, Godzilla Against Mechagodzilla, Godzilla: Tokyo S.O.S.	September 25, 2014
28	"Ultraman Nexus: Origins"	ウルトラマンネクサスの感謝	Hiroyasu Shibuya, Keiichi Hasegawa, Kazuya Konaka, Yuichi Abe	October 2, 2014
29	"Tokyo Game Show 2014"	東京ゲームショウ2014	Godzilla, Bandai Namco Games, Shunsuke Fujita	October 9, 2014
30	"Ultraman Nexus: Production"	ウルトラマンネクサスの製作	Hiroyasu Shibuya, Keiichi Hasegawa, Kazuya Konaka, Yuichi Abe	October 16, 2014
31	"First Look: No Face"	短編ホラー映画「NO FACE」予告	TBA	October 23, 2014
32	"Making of No Face"	「NO FACE」のメイキング	TBA	October 30, 2014
33	"Ultraman Nexus: Memories"	ウルトラマンネクサスの思い出	Hiroyasu Shibuya, Keiichi Hasegawa, Kazuya Konaka, Yuichi Abe	November 6, 2014
34	"Tokyo Toy Shopping PART II"	怪獣買いもの PART II	Godzilla, Ultraman, Gamera, Kamen Rider	November 13, 2014
3EX	"EXTRA: The Man Who Became Godzilla"	ゴジラになった男〜EXTRA〜	Godzilla, Haruo Nakajima	November 20, 2014
35	"International Manga Festival"	海外マンガフェスタ	TBA	November 28, 2014
36	"The Return of Godzilla 30th"	『ゴジラ（'８４）』３０周年スペシャル	Godzilla, Teruyoshi Nakano	December 4, 2014
36EX	"EXTRA: The Return of Godzilla 30th"	『ゴジラ（'８４）』３０周年スペシャル〜EXTRA〜	Godzilla, Teruyoshi Nakano	December 11, 2014
37	"Final Episode"	最終回	TBA	December 18, 2014
SP	"Special: Shin Godzilla New York City Premiere"	TBA	Shin Godzilla, Godzilla	October 9, 2016
SP	"Special: Interview With GODZILLA AND GODZILLA RAIDS AGAIN: THE ORIGINAL NOVELS Translator Jeffrey Angles"	TBA	Godzilla, "Godzilla Raids Again" Jeffrey Angles	September 26, 2023

== See also ==
- Tokusatsu
- Kaiju
