= Godzilla (franchise) =

Japanese media franchise

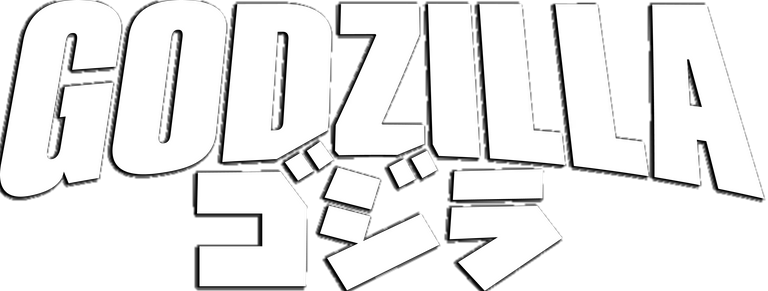
- Current official brand logo
- Created by: Tomoyuki Tanaka; Eiji Tsuburaya; Ishirō Honda; Shigeru Kayama
- Original work: Godzilla (1954)
- Owner: Toho Co., Ltd.
- Years: 1954–present

Print publications
- Books: Cerasini novels; Ciencin novels; Monsterverse books
- Comics: Full list

Films and television
- Films: Toho (34 films; 1954–current); TriStar Pictures (Note: Godzilla (1998) was a co-production between Centropolis Entertainment, Fried Films, Independent Pictures, and TriStar Pictures.) (1 film; 1998); Legendary Pictures (4 films; 2014–current)
- Television series: Full list

Games
- Video games: Full list

Audio
- Soundtracks: Godzilla: The Album (1998); Godzilla, Mothra and King Ghidorah: Giant Monsters All-Out Attack (2001); Godzilla: Final Wars (2004); Godzilla (2014); Godzilla: King of the Monsters (2019); Godzilla vs. Kong (2021); Godzilla Minus One (2023); Godzilla x Kong: The New Empire (2024); Godzilla Minus Zero (2026)

Miscellaneous
- American series: Monsterverse

Official website
- godzilla.com

Godzilla (Japanese: ゴジラ, Hepburn: Gojira) is a Japanese kaiju multimedia franchise centering on the titular character, a prehistoric reptilian monster awakened and powered by nuclear radiation. The film series is recognized by the Guinness World Records as the longest continuously running film series, having been in ongoing production since 1954 with several hiatuses of varying lengths. There are 39 Godzilla films: 34 Japanese films produced and distributed by Toho Co., Ltd., and five American films; one by TriStar Pictures and four films (part of the Monsterverse franchise) by Legendary Pictures.

The original film, Godzilla, was directed by and co-written by Ishirō Honda and released by Toho in 1954. It became an influential classic of the genre. It featured political and social undertones relevant to Japan at the time. The 1954 film and its special effects director Eiji Tsuburaya are largely credited for establishing the template for tokusatsu, a technique of practical special effects filmmaking that would become essential in Japan's film industry since the release of Godzilla (1954). For its North American release, the film was localized in 1956 as Godzilla, King of the Monsters! and featured new footage with Raymond Burr edited together with the original Japanese footage.

The popularity of the films has led to the film series expanding to other media, such as television, music, literature and video games. Godzilla has become one of the most recognizable symbols in Japanese pop culture worldwide and a well-known facet of Japanese cinema. It is also considered one of the first examples of the popular kaiju and tokusatsu subgenres in Japanese entertainment.

Godzilla films vary in the complexity of themes and targeted audience. Several of the films have political themes, dark tones, and complex internal mythology, while others are simple action films featuring aliens or other monsters or have simpler themes accessible to children. Godzilla's role varies from purely a destructive force to an anti-hero, ally of humans, a symbolic protector or destroyer of Japanese values, or a hero to children.

== Name ==
The name "Godzilla" is a romanization of the original Japanese name Gojira (ゴジラ)—which is a combination of two Japanese words: gorira (ゴリラ), "gorilla", and kujira (クジラ), "whale". The word alludes to the size, power and aquatic origin of Godzilla. As developed by Toho, the monster is an offshoot of the combination of radioactivity and ancient dinosaur-like creatures, indestructible and possessing special powers.

== History ==
The Godzilla film series is broken into several different eras reflecting a characteristic style and corresponding to the same eras used to classify all kaiju eiga (monster movies) in Japan. The first, second, and fourth eras refer to the Japanese emperor during production: the Shōwa era, the Heisei era, and the Reiwa era. The last phase of the second is called the Millennium era, as the emperor (Heisei) is the same, but these films are considered to have a different style and storyline than the Heisei era.

Over the series' history, the films have reflected the social and political climate in Japan. In the original film, Godzilla was an allegory for the effects of the atomic bomb, and the consequences that such weapons might have on Earth. The radioactive contamination of the Japanese fishing boat Lucky Dragon No. 5 through the United States' Castle Bravo thermonuclear device test at Bikini Atoll on March 1, 1954, led to much press coverage in Japan preceding the release of the first film in 1954. The Heisei and Millennium series have largely continued this concept. Toho was inspired to make the original Godzilla film after the commercial success of the 1952 re-release of King Kong and the success of The Beast from 20,000 Fathoms (1953), the first live-action film to feature a giant monster awakened following an atomic bomb detonation. The success of the Godzilla franchise itself would go on to inspire other giant monster films worldwide.

=== Shōwa era (1954–1975) ===
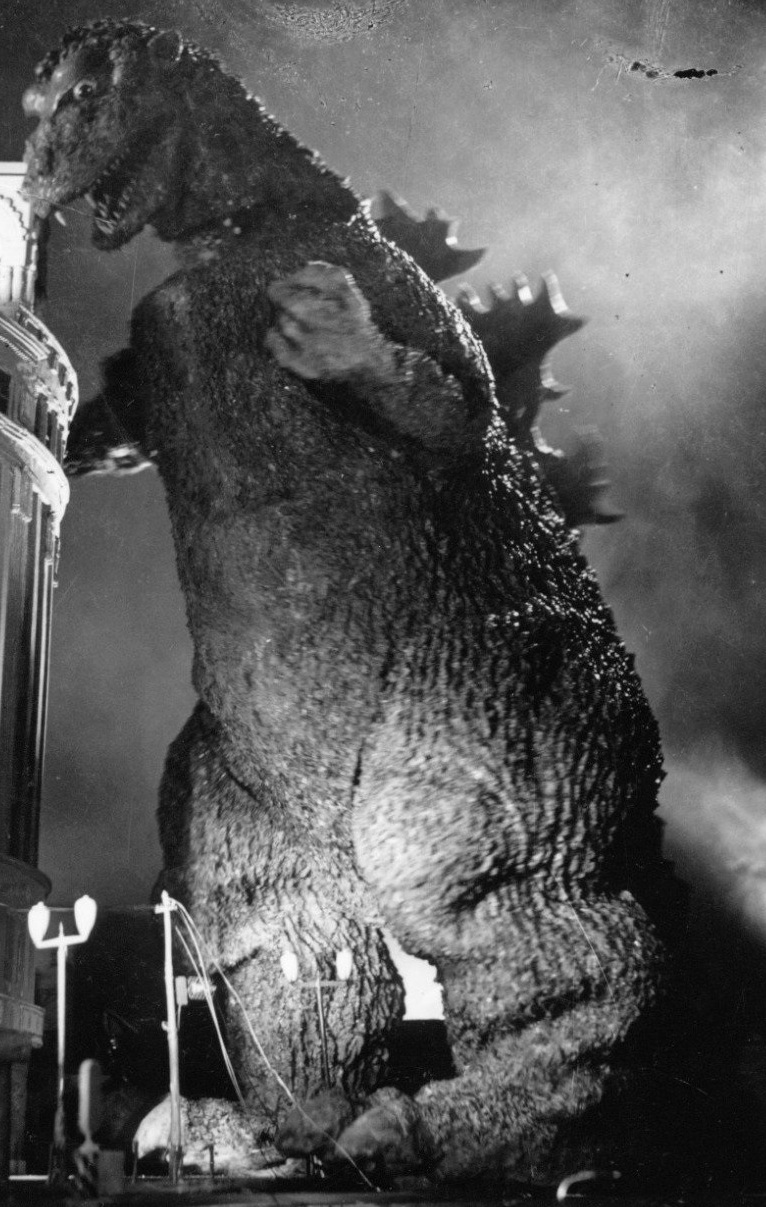
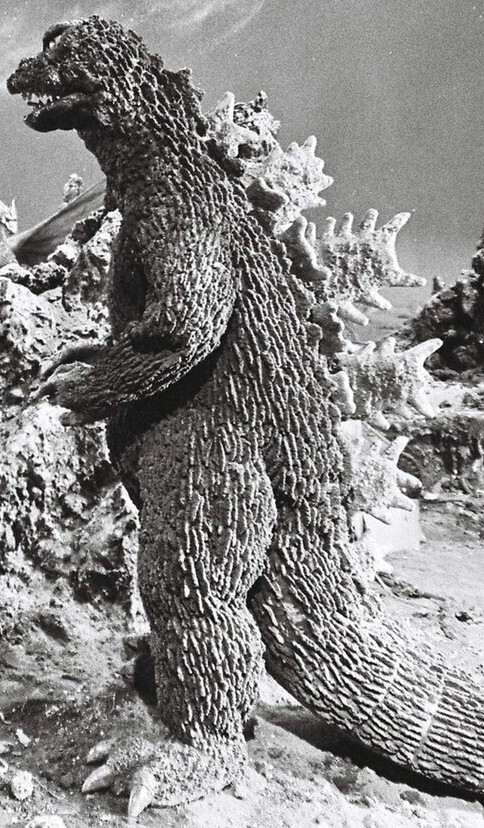
The Shōwa iterations of Godzilla featured in Godzilla (1954) and Invasion of Astro-Monster (1965).

The initial series of films are named after the Shōwa era (as all of these films were produced during Emperor Shōwa's reign). This Shōwa timeline spanned from 1954, with Godzilla, to 1975, with Terror of Mechagodzilla.

The first Godzilla film initially began as a Japanese-Indonesian co-production titled In the Shadow of Glory (栄光のかげに, Eikō no Kage ni). (Note: Also known as Behind the Glory and In the Shadow of Honor.) However, the project was cancelled after the Indonesian government denied visas to Toho's crew due to anti-Japanese sentiments and political pressure. On his flight back to Japan after a failed attempt to renegotiate with the Indonesian government, film producer Tomoyuki Tanaka conceived an idea for a giant monster film inspired by The Beast from 20,000 Fathoms and the then-recent Daigo Fukuryū Maru incident. Tanaka then succeeded in convincing executive producer Iwao Mori to replace In the Shadow of Glory with his monster idea, after special effects director Eiji Tsuburaya agreed to do the film.

Tsuburaya initially proposed a giant octopus-like monster, and later a gorilla-like or whale-like monster to reflect the creature's name Gojira, a combination of the Japanese words for gorilla (ゴリラ, gorira) and whale (クジラ, kujira). But Tsuburaya settled on a dinosaur-like monster designed by Teizō Toshimitsu and Akira Watanabe under his supervision. Tanaka handpicked Ishirō Honda to direct and co-write the film, feeling that his wartime experience was ideal for the film's anti-nuclear themes, despite Honda not being Toho's first choice. Principal photography ran 51 days, and special effects photography ran 71 days.

Godzilla was first released in Nagoya on October 27, 1954, and released nationwide on November 3, 1954. Despite mixed reviews, it was a box office success. It became the eighth best-attended film in Japan that year, and earned ¥183 million (just under $510,000) in distributor rentals during its initial run, with total lifetime gross receipts of $2.25 million. The film was nominated for Best Picture and Best Special Effects at the Japanese Movie Association Awards, where it won the latter.

Starting with Ghidorah, the Three-Headed Monster, Godzilla began evolving into a friendlier, more playful antihero (this transition was complete by Son of Godzilla, where Godzilla is depicted as a more virtuous character) and, as years went by, it evolved into an anthropomorphic superhero. Ghidorah the Three-Headed Monster was also significant for introducing Godzilla's archenemy and the main antagonist of the film series, King Ghidorah.

Son of Godzilla and All Monsters Attack were aimed at youthful audiences, featuring the appearance of Godzilla's son, Minilla. Godzilla vs. Mechagodzilla was notable for introducing Mechagodzilla, Godzilla's robot duplicate and the secondary antagonist of the film series. The Shōwa period loosely tied in a number of Toho-produced films in which Godzilla himself did not appear and consequently saw the addition of many monsters into the Godzilla continuity, three of which (Rodan, Varan, and Mothra) originated in their own solo films and another five (Anguirus, Manda, Baragon, Gorosaurus and Kumonga) appeared in their first films as either secondary antagonists or secondary kaiju.

Haruo Nakajima mainly portrayed Godzilla since 1954 until his retirement in 1972. However, other stunt actors have portrayed the character in his absence, such as Katsumi Tezuka, Yū Sekida, Ryosaku Takasugi, Seiji Onaka, Shinji Takagi, Isao Zushi, and Toru Kawai. Eiji Tsuburaya directed the special effects for the first six films of the series. His protege Sadamasa Arikawa took over the effects work for the next three films (with Tsuburaya supervising), while Teruyoshi Nakano directed the special effects for the last six films of the series.

The Criterion Collection released the Shōwa era films as part of a Blu-ray box set in the United States and Canada on October 29, 2019.

=== Heisei era (1984–1995) ===
The Heisei iteration of Godzilla, as depicted in Godzilla vs. Mothra (1992)

Toho rebooted the series in 1984 with The Return of Godzilla, starting the second era of Godzilla films, known as the Heisei series. The Return of Godzilla serves as a direct sequel to the original 1954 film and ignores the subsequent events of the Shōwa series. Despite being released within Japan's political Shōwa era five years before the new Emperor's reign, The Return of Godzilla is part of the Heisei series because it is a direct predecessor to Godzilla vs. Biollante (1989), which came out in the first year of the new Emperor's reign.

The Heisei films are set in a single, continuous timeline that brings Godzilla back as a destructive force of nature that is feared by humans. The biological nature and science behind Godzilla became more discussed in the films, showing an increased focus on the moral aspects of genetics. Godzilla vs. King Ghidorah gave Godzilla's first concrete birth story, featuring a dinosaur named Godzillasaurus that was mutated by nuclear radiation into Godzilla. Godzilla was portrayed by Kenpachiro Satsuma for the Heisei films while the special effects were directed by Koichi Kawakita, with the exception of The Return of Godzilla, for which the effects were directed by Teruyoshi Nakano.

=== Millennium era (1999–2004) ===
The Millennium iterations of Godzilla, as depicted from left to right in Godzilla 2000 (1999), Godzilla vs. Megaguirus (2000), Godzilla, Mothra and King Ghidorah: Giant Monsters All-Out Attack (2001), Godzilla: Tokyo S.O.S. (2003) and Godzilla: Final Wars (2004)

Toho rebooted the franchise for a second time with the 1999 film Godzilla 2000: Millennium, starting the third era of Godzilla films, known as the Millennium series. Despite them all being released during the Heisei period of Japan, this era is named as such to tie in with the first few years of the third millennium. The Millennium series is treated similarly to an anthology series where each film is a standalone story, with the 1954 film serving as the only previous point of reference. Godzilla Against Mechagodzilla and Godzilla: Tokyo S.O.S. are the only films in the Millennium era to share continuity with each other and are also connected to 1961's Mothra and to 1966's The War of the Gargantuas. Another exception to this rule is 2004's Godzilla: Final Wars, that continues the trend of being a standalone story, but the events of the 1954 film are ignored here, making this the first Toho produced film in the series to do so.

After the release of Godzilla: Final Wars, marking the 50th anniversary of the Godzilla film franchise, Toho decided to put the series on hiatus for another 10 years. Toho also demolished the water stage on its lot used in numerous Godzilla, kaiju and tokusatsu films. Yoshimitsu Banno, who had directed 1971's Godzilla vs. Hedorah, secured the rights from Toho to make an IMAX 3D short film production, based on a story similar to his Hedorah film. This project eventually led to the development of Legendary's Godzilla. Tsutomu Kitagawa portrayed Godzilla for the majority of the Millennium films, with the exception of Godzilla, Mothra and King Ghidorah: Giant Monsters All-Out Attack, in which Godzilla was portrayed by Mizuho Yoshida. Unlike the Shōwa and later Heisei films, the special effects for the Millennium films were directed by multiple effects directors such as Kenji Suzuki (Godzilla 2000, Godzilla vs. Megaguirus), Makoto Kamiya (Godzilla, Mothra and King Ghidorah: Giant Monsters All-Out Attack), Yuichi Kikuchi (Godzilla Against Mechagodzilla), and Eiichi Asada (Godzilla: Tokyo S.O.S., Godzilla: Final Wars).

=== Reiwa era (2016–present) ===
The Reiwa iterations of Godzilla.

In December 2014, Toho announced plans for a new Godzilla film of its own for a 2016 release. The film, Shin Godzilla, was Toho's reboot of the Godzilla franchise, after Legendary Pictures' reboot in 2014, and was co-directed by Hideaki Anno and Shinji Higuchi (both of whom collaborated on the anime Neon Genesis Evangelion), with the screenplay written by Anno and the visual effects directed by Higuchi. Principal photography began in September 2015 and ended in October of the same year, with the special effects work following in November. Shin Godzilla was released in Japan on July 29, 2016, in IMAX, 4DX, and MX4D to positive reviews and was a box office success.

After the release of Shin Godzilla, Toho established a "Godzilla Room", a group consisting of 14 individuals that were tasked with studying all the previous films that involved the character and to ensure that further movies would avoid damaging the brand. The group wrote up a new set of mandated guidelines that all feature films and merchandise had to follow, which involved the prohibition of permanently killing off the character and keeping him from preying on "people or things" to ensure that every appearance remained authentic.

In August 2016, Toho announced plans for a trilogy of anime Godzilla films with Polygon Pictures animating the films and Netflix distributing the trilogy worldwide, except in Japan where each film will be given a theatrical release by Toho. The first film, titled Godzilla: Planet of the Monsters, was released on November 17, 2017. The second film, titled Godzilla: City on the Edge of Battle, was released on May 18, 2018. The third and final film in the trilogy, titled Godzilla: The Planet Eater, was released on November 9, 2018.

In January 2018, Toho announced its plans to invest ¥15 billion (US$135 million) for the next three years beginning in 2019 to co-produce content with Hollywood and Chinese studios who have licensed Toho's properties, such as Godzilla, Your Name and Pokémon. Toho would invest 25% in production costs and would earn a higher share in revenue and manage creators rights, so its creative input would be reflected in each work. In May 2018, Toho's Chief Godzilla Officer Keiji Ota revealed that a sequel to Shin Godzilla would not happen, but expressed interest in a potential shared cinematic series between Godzilla and other Toho monsters akin to the Marvel Cinematic Universe.

In 2019, Toho invested ¥15.4 billion (US$140 million) into its Los Angeles-based subsidiary Toho International Inc. as part of its "Toho Vision 2021 Medium-term Management Strategy", a strategy to increase content, platform, real-estate, surpass ¥50 billion in profits, and increase character businesses on Toho intellectual properties such as Godzilla. Hiroyasu Matsuoka was named the representative director of the project. In 2019, Toho launched the first official English-language website and the first official English-language Twitter and Instagram accounts for the franchise.

In June 2019, Toho revealed plans to present the Toho Godzilla at San Diego Comic-Con for the first time to commemorate the franchise's 65th anniversary, as well as being part of its plan to expand the franchise in the United States. At San Diego Comic-Con, Akito Takahashi, the project manager of Toho's Godzilla Strategic Conference, revealed Toho's intentions to have the Toho and Legendary Godzilla films expand together. He also revealed that the option to reintroduce political themes and old or new monsters would be available to filmmakers, should they choose to pursue it. Akito also expressed interest in re-introducing Mechagodzilla and Jet Jaguar in the future.

In October 2020, Toho announced plans for an anime series titled Godzilla Singular Point released on Netflix in 2021, revealing artwork for Godzilla and its principal characters. The project was directed by Atsushi Takahashi, with music by Kan Sawada, written by Toh Enjoe, character designs by Kazue Kato, and animations by Eiji Yamamori. The series was produced by Bones Inc. in partnership with Orange Co., Ltd., featured hand-drawn and CG animation, and had no relation to Polygon's anime film trilogy.

On November 3, 2022, during the franchise's 68th anniversary known as "Godzilla Day", Toho announced plans to release a new live-action Godzilla film, Godzilla Minus One, on November 3, 2023, to commemorate the franchise's 70th anniversary. Toho also stated that Takashi Yamazaki was the director, writer, and visual effects supervisor for this new film and that it had entered post-production after recently completed filming. According to Collider, Minus One became the most commercially successful Japanese film in the series and "helped the Godzilla series become more popular than ever before". In 2024, Minus One won the Academy Award for Best Visual Effects, becoming the first Godzilla film to win an Academy Award, as well as the first Japanese film to win Best Visual Effects.

On November 1, 2024, Toho announced plans to move forward with a new Godzilla film with Yamazaki returning to direct, write, and handle visual effects. Later revealed as Godzilla Minus Zero, it was released on November 3, 2026 in Japan; select theaters in the United States provided early access for that day to commemorate "Godzilla Day."

In July 2025, Toho International president Koji Ueda revealed that a Shin Godzilla sequel is among the many Godzilla projects in development.

=== American films ===
==== The Volcano Monsters (1957) ====
The producers of Godzilla, King of the Monsters! – Harry Rybnick, Richard Kay, Edward Barison, Paul Schreibman, and Edmund Goldman – purchased the North American rights to the 1955 sequel Godzilla Raids Again but rather than localize or dub the film in English, they chose to produce a new film that would repurpose the effects footage from Godzilla Raids Again; filming was expected to begin in June 1957. Rybnick hired Ib Melchior and Edwin Watson to write a script, titled The Volcano Monsters, that focused on a new story with American characters centered around the effects footage. Toho approved of the idea in early 1957 and shipped the Godzilla and Anguirus suits for additional photography to be shot at Howard A. Anderson's special effects studio. Rybnick and Barison originally made a deal with AB-PT Pictures Corp. to co-finance the film but plans for The Volcano Monsters were cancelled after AB-PT Pictures folded. Schreibman, Goldman, and new financier Newton P. Jacobs, decided to dub Godzilla Raids Again into English instead.

==== Unproduced 3D film (1983) ====
Storyboard by William Stout for Steve Miner's unproduced 3D Godzilla film. Stout chose to reinvent his Godzilla design as an amalgam between a Tyrannosaurus and Toho's original design.

In 1983, director Steve Miner pitched his idea for an American 3D production of Godzilla to Toho, with storyboards by William Stout and a script written by Fred Dekker, titled Godzilla: King of the Monsters in 3D, which would have featured Godzilla rampaging through San Francisco in an attempt to find its offspring. Various studios and producers expressed interest but passed it over due to high budget concerns. The film would have featured a full scale animatronic Godzilla head built by Rick Baker, stop motion animation executed by David W. Allen, an articulated stop motion Godzilla figure created by Stephen Czerkas, and additional storyboards by Doug Wildey. The production design would have been overseen by William Stout.

==== TriStar Pictures (1998–2000) ====
In October 1992, TriStar Pictures acquired the rights from Toho with plans to produce a trilogy. Director Jan de Bont and writers Terry Rossio and Ted Eliott developed a script that had Godzilla battling a shape-shifting alien called "the Gryphon". De Bont later left the project after budget disagreements with the studio. Roland Emmerich was hired to direct and co-write a new script with producer Dean Devlin.

A co-production between Centropolis Entertainment, Fried Films, Independent Pictures, and TriStar Pictures, Godzilla was theatrically released on May 20, 1998, to negative reviews and grossed $379 million worldwide against a production budget between $130–150 million. Despite grossing nearly three times its budget, it was considered a box office disappointment. Two planned sequels were cancelled and an animated TV series was produced instead. TriStar let the license expire in 2003. In 2004, a new iteration of TriStar's Godzilla appeared in Toho's Godzilla: Final Wars as "Zilla." This variant has since appeared in various media under the "Zilla" trademark, while the incarnations from the 1998 film and animated series retain the Godzilla copyright and trademark.

==== Legendary Pictures (2014–present) ====
In 2004, director Yoshimitsu Banno acquired permission from Toho to produce a short IMAX Godzilla film. In 2009, the project was turned over to Legendary Pictures to be redeveloped as a feature film. Announced in March 2010, the film was co-produced with Warner Bros. Pictures and was directed by Gareth Edwards.

Godzilla was theatrically released on May 16, 2014, to positive reviews and was a box office success, grossing $529 million worldwide against a production budget of $160 million. The film's success prompted Toho to produce a reboot of their own and Legendary to proceed with sequels and a shared cinematic franchise dubbed the Monsterverse: with Godzilla: King of the Monsters released on May 31, 2019; Godzilla vs. Kong released on March 24, 2021; the TV series Monarch: Legacy of Monsters released on November 17, 2023, on Apple TV+; and Godzilla x Kong: The New Empire released on March 29, 2024.

== Filmography ==
=== Toho films ===
№	Title	Year	Director(s)	Effects director(s)	Monster co-star(s)
Shōwa era (1954–1975)
1	Godzilla	1954	Ishirō Honda	Eiji Tsuburaya	—N/a
2	Godzilla Raids Again	1955	Motoyoshi Oda	Eiji Tsuburaya	Anguirus
3	King Kong vs. Godzilla	1962	Ishirō Honda	Eiji Tsuburaya	King Kong, the Oodako (Note: "Oodako" literally means "giant octopus" in Japanese.)
4	Mothra vs. Godzilla	1964	Ishirō Honda	Eiji Tsuburaya	Mothra
5	Ghidorah, the Three-Headed Monster	1964	Ishirō Honda	Eiji Tsuburaya	King Ghidorah, Rodan, Mothra
6	Invasion of Astro-Monster	1965	Ishirō Honda	Eiji Tsuburaya	King Ghidorah, Rodan
7	Ebirah, Horror of the Deep	1966	Jun Fukuda	Sadamasa Arikawa	Ebirah, Mothra, the Ookondoru (Note: "Ookondoru" literally means "giant condor" in Japanese.)
8	Son of Godzilla	1967	Jun Fukuda	Sadamasa Arikawa	Minilla, Kumonga, Kamacuras
9	Destroy All Monsters	1968	Ishirō Honda	Sadamasa Arikawa	King Ghidorah, Rodan, Mothra, Anguirus, Minilla, Kumonga, Manda, Gorosaurus, Baragon, Varan
10	All Monsters Attack	1969	Ishirō Honda	Ishirō Honda; Teruyoshi Nakano	Gabara, Maneater, Minilla (Note: The film briefly recycles footage of Gorosaurus, Manda, Anguirus, Ebirah, Giant Condor, Kamacuras, and Kumonga from Son of Godzilla, King Kong Escapes and Ebirah, Horror of the Deep.)
11	Godzilla vs. Hedorah	1971	Yoshimitsu Banno	Teruyoshi Nakano	Hedorah
12	Godzilla vs. Gigan	1972	Jun Fukuda	Teruyoshi Nakano	Gigan, King Ghidorah, Anguirus (Note: The film briefly recycles footage of Rodan, Mothra, Gorosaurus, Minilla, Kamacuras, and Kumonga from Son of Godzilla and Destroy All Monsters.)
13	Godzilla vs. Megalon	1973	Jun Fukuda	Teruyoshi Nakano	Megalon, Jet Jaguar, Gigan
14	Godzilla vs. Mechagodzilla	1974	Jun Fukuda	Teruyoshi Nakano	Mechagodzilla, King Caesar, Anguirus
15	Terror of Mechagodzilla	1975	Ishirō Honda	Teruyoshi Nakano	Mechagodzilla 2, Titanosaurus
Heisei era (1984–1995)
16	The Return of Godzilla	1984	Kōji Hashimoto	Teruyoshi Nakano	Shockirus (Note: While unnamed in the film, the Giant Sea Lice are called ショッキラス ("Shokkirasu") in official Japanese sources, and "Shockirus" has become the accepted Romanization of that name.) (Giant Sea Lice)
17	Godzilla vs. Biollante	1989	Kazuki Ōmori	Kōichi Kawakita	Biollante
18	Godzilla vs. King Ghidorah	1991	Kazuki Ōmori	Kōichi Kawakita	King Ghidorah, Mecha-King Ghidorah, the Dorats, Godzillasaurus
19	Godzilla vs. Mothra	1992	Takao Ōkawara	Kōichi Kawakita	Mothra, Battra
20	Godzilla vs. Mechagodzilla II	1993	Takao Ōkawara	Kōichi Kawakita	Mechagodzilla, Super Mechagodzilla, Rodan, Fire Rodan, Baby Godzilla, Mecha-King Ghidorah
21	Godzilla vs. SpaceGodzilla	1994	Kenshō Yamashita	Kōichi Kawakita	SpaceGodzilla, Moguera, Fairy Mothra, Little Godzilla
22	Godzilla vs. Destoroyah	1995	Takao Ōkawara	Kōichi Kawakita	Destoroyah, Godzilla Junior
Millennium era (1999–2004)
23	Godzilla 2000: Millennium	1999	Takao Ōkawara	Kenji Suzuki	Orga, the Millennian
24	Godzilla vs. Megaguirus	2000	Masaaki Tezuka	Kenji Suzuki	Megaguirus, the Meganulons, the Meganulas
25	Godzilla, Mothra and King Ghidorah: Giant Monsters All-Out Attack	2001	Shūsuke Kaneko	Makoto Kamiya	King Ghidorah, Mothra, Baragon
26	Godzilla Against Mechagodzilla	2002	Masaaki Tezuka	Yūichi Kikuchi	Mechagodzilla (Note: Referred to as Kiryu.)
27	Godzilla: Tokyo S.O.S.	2003	Masaaki Tezuka	Eiichi Asada	Mechagodzilla, Mothra, Kamoebas
28	Godzilla: Final Wars	2004	Ryūhei Kitamura	Eiichi Asada	Monster X, Keizer Ghidorah, Zilla, Rodan, Mothra, Gigan, King Caesar, Anguirus, Minilla, Kumonga, Kamacuras, Manda, Hedorah, Ebirah
Reiwa era (2016–present) (Note: Japan's Reiwa era began on May 1, 2019; however, Toho considers Shin Godzilla and the anime trilogy as part of the Reiwa era.)
29	Shin Godzilla	2016	Hideaki Anno; Shinji Higuchi	Shinji Higuchi; Katsuro Onoue	—N/a
30	Godzilla: Planet of the Monsters	2017	Kōbun Shizuno; Hiroyuki Seshita	—N/a	Servum, Dogora, Dagahra, Orga, Kamacuras, Anguirus, Rodan, Mechagodzilla
31	Godzilla: City on the Edge of Battle	2018	Kōbun Shizuno; Hiroyuki Seshita	—N/a	Mechagodzilla City, Servum, Vulture
32	Godzilla: The Planet Eater	2018	Kōbun Shizuno; Hiroyuki Seshita	—N/a	King Ghidorah, Mothra, Servum
33	Godzilla Minus One	2023	Takashi Yamazaki	Takashi Yamazaki; Kiyoko Shibuya (Note: Yamazaki is credited by Japanese sources as in charge of VFX, while English sources have said he was visual effects supervisor. For Minus One, Shibuya is credited in the Japanese theatrical release poster and a TV Shinshu television special as the VFX director (VFXディレクター, VFX direkutā). However, for Minus Zero, Shibuya, Ueki, and Okubo are credited as the visual effects supervisors on the film's poster.)	—N/a
34	Godzilla Minus Zero	2026	Takashi Yamazaki	Takashi Yamazaki; Kiyoko Shibuya; Takayuki Ueki; Eishin Okubo	King Ghidorah

=== American films ===
№	Title	Year	Director(s)	Effects supervisor	Monster co-star(s)
TriStar Pictures (1998)
1	Godzilla	1998	Roland Emmerich	Volker Engel	Baby Godzillas
Legendary Pictures / Monsterverse (2014–present)
2	Godzilla	2014	Gareth Edwards	Jim Rygiel	MUTOs (male and female), Adam/Dagon
3	Godzilla: King of the Monsters	2019	Michael Dougherty	Guillaume Rocheron	King Ghidorah, Mothra, Rodan, Queen MUTO, Behemoth, Methuselah, Scylla
4	Godzilla vs. Kong	2021	Adam Wingard	John "DJ" DesJardin	Kong, Mechagodzilla, Skullcrawler, Warbat, Hell Hawk, Titanus Doug
5	Godzilla x Kong: The New Empire	2024	Adam Wingard	Alessandro Ongaro	Kong, Skar King, Tiamat, Shimo, Suko, Mothra, Titanus Doug, Wart Dog, Scylla, Vertacine, Drownviper, Great Apes
6	Godzilla x Kong: Supernova	2027	Grant Sputore	Kelly Port	Kong, SpaceGodzilla

=== Guest appearances ===
In 2007, a CGI Godzilla appeared in the Toho slice of life film Always: Sunset on Third Street 2. In an imaginary sequence, Godzilla destroys part of 1959 Tokyo, with one of the main protagonists getting angry that Godzilla damaged his car showroom. The making of the sequence was kept a secret. Godzilla has been referenced in, and has briefly appeared in, several other films. Godzilla guest starred in the show Crayon Shin-chan as an antagonist. Godzilla also appears in cave paintings (alongside Rodan, Mothra and King Ghidorah) in a post-credits scene in Kong: Skull Island. In 2019, Godzilla made an appearance in the anime film Shinkansen Henkei Robo Shinkalion the Movie: Mirai Kara Kita Shinsoku no ALFA-X.

=== Localized releases ===
In 1956, Jewell Enterprises Inc., released Godzilla, King of the Monsters!, an American localization of Godzilla (1954). This version removed most of the political themes and social commentaries, resulting in 30 minutes of footage from the Japanese version replaced with new footage featuring Raymond Burr interacting with Japanese actors and look-alikes to make it seem like Burr was a part of the original Japanese production. In addition, the soundtrack and sound effects were slightly altered and some dialogue was dubbed into English. This release is referred to as an "Americanization" or the "Americanized" version by some sources. Similar localizations (or Americanizations) occurred for the U.S. releases of The Return of Godzilla, released in the U.S. as Godzilla 1985, the latter which had Burr reprising the role of Steve Martin from Godzilla, King of the Monsters!.

In 1957, the same American producers of Godzilla, King of the Monsters! attempted to produce The Volcano Monsters, a new film that would have repurposed the effects footage of Godzilla Raids Again around a new story with American characters. However, funding from AB-PT Pictures collapsed after the company closed down and Godzilla Raids Again was instead re-cut, dubbed in English, and released in 1959 by Warner Bros. as Gigantis, the Fire Monster.

In the early 1960s, American producer John Beck sold the King Kong vs. Prometheus script to Toho (later redeveloped as King Kong vs. Godzilla), and was given exclusive distribution rights (theatrical and television) for the United States, Canada, Alaska, the United Kingdom, and Israel, while Toho retained exclusive distribution for the Far East. The American version slightly altered the story by adding new footage with Michael Keith as Eric Carter, a United Nations reporter covering the events of the film, and Harry Holcombe as Dr. Arnold Johnson, the head of the Museum of Natural History in New York City who tries to explain Godzilla's origin and his and Kong's motivations. Akira Ifukube's original score was replaced with stock music recycled from other films such as Creature from the Black Lagoon (1954), and brief stock footage from The Mysterians (1957).

In 1976, Italian director Luigi Cozzi intended to re-release Godzilla in Italy (known by fans as "Cozzilla"). Facing resistance from exhibitors to showing a black-and-white film, Cozzi instead licensed a negative of Godzilla, King of the Monsters from Toho and created a new film in color, adding much stock footage of graphic death and destruction and short scenes from newsreel footage from World War II, which he released as Godzilla in 1977. The film was colorized using a process called Spectrorama 70, where color gels are put on the original black-and-white film, becoming one of the first black-and-white films to be colorized. Dialogue was dubbed into Italian and new music was added. After the initial Italian run, the negative became Toho's property and prints have only been exhibited in Italy from that time onward. Italian firm Yamato Video at one time intended to release the colorized version on a two-disc DVD along with the original Godzilla.

Year	Title	Notes	Director(s)
1956	Godzilla, King of the Monsters!	Re-edited American version of Godzilla (1954) with additional footage	Ishirō Honda; Terry O. Morse
1959	Gigantis, the Fire Monster	Re-edited American version of Godzilla Raids Again (1955)	Motoyoshi Oda; Hugo Grimaldi
1963	King Kong vs. Godzilla	Re-edited American version of King Kong vs. Godzilla (1962) with additional footage	Ishirō Honda; Tom Montgomery
1977	Godzilla	Re-edited Italian version of Godzilla, King of the Monsters! (1956) with additional footage	Ishirō Honda; Luigi Cozzi
1985	Godzilla 1985	Re-edited American version of The Return of Godzilla (1984) with additional footage	Koji Hashimoto; R.J. Kizer

== Reception ==
=== Critical response ===
==== Toho productions ====
This list includes American versions of Toho originals. There are no critic scores for Return of Godzilla, but for the recut American version of this film, Godzilla 1985.

Title	Rotten Tomatoes	Metacritic
Godzilla (1954)	94% (78 reviews)	79 (20 reviews)
Godzilla, King of the Monsters! (1956)	85% (26 reviews)	61 (8 reviews)
Godzilla Raids Again (1955)	64% (11 reviews)	
King Kong vs. Godzilla (1963) (Note: Reviews are attributed to the American version)	52% (21 reviews)	40 (4 reviews)
Mothra vs. Godzilla (1964)	92% (13 reviews)	
Ghidorah, the Three-Headed Monster (1964)	77% (13 reviews)	
Invasion of Astro-Monster (1965)	50% (8 reviews)	
Ebirah, Horror of the Deep (1966)	63% (8 reviews)	
Son of Godzilla (1967)	63% (16 reviews)	
Destroy All Monsters (1968)	82% (11 reviews)	
All Monsters Attack (1969)	29% (7 reviews)	
Godzilla vs. Hedorah (1971)	67% (15 reviews)	
Godzilla vs. Gigan (1972)	67% (6 reviews)	
Godzilla vs. Megalon (1973)	38% (8 reviews)	
Godzilla vs. Mechagodzilla (1974)	86% (7 reviews)	
Terror of Mechagodzilla (1975)	43% (7 reviews)	
Godzilla 1985 (1985)	20% (10 reviews)	31 (6 reviews)
Godzilla vs. Biollante (1989)	71% (7 reviews)	
Godzilla vs. King Ghidorah (1991)	56% (9 reviews)	
Godzilla vs. Mothra (1992)	78% (9 reviews)	
Godzilla vs. Mechagodzilla II (1993)	83% (6 reviews)	
Godzilla vs. SpaceGodzilla (1994)	57% (7 reviews)	
Godzilla vs. Destoroyah (1995)	100% (6 reviews)	
Godzilla 2000 (1999)	57% (69 reviews)	41 (23 reviews)
Godzilla vs. Megaguirus (2000)	60% (5 reviews)	
Godzilla, Mothra and King Ghidorah: Giant Monsters All-Out Attack (2001)	65% (17 reviews)	
Godzilla Against Mechagodzilla (2002)	72% (4 reviews)	
Godzilla: Tokyo S.O.S. (2003)	80% (5 reviews)	
Godzilla: Final Wars (2004)	50% (12 reviews)	
Shin Godzilla (2016)	86% (73 reviews)	68 (14 reviews)
Godzilla: Planet of the Monsters (2017)	71% (7 reviews)	
Godzilla: City on the Edge of Battle (2018)	60% (5 reviews)	
Godzilla: The Planet Eater (2018)	60% (5 reviews)	
Godzilla Singular Point (2021)	56% (9 reviews)	
Godzilla Minus One (2023)	99% (181 reviews)	81 (34 reviews)
Godzilla Minus Zero (2026)	91% (191 reviews)	74 (44 reviews)

==== American productions ====
Title	Rotten Tomatoes	Metacritic
Godzilla (1998)	20% (150 reviews)	32 (23 reviews)
Godzilla (2014)	76% (330 reviews)	62 (48 reviews)
Godzilla: King of the Monsters (2019)	42% (354 reviews)	48 (46 reviews)
Godzilla vs. Kong (2021)	76% (392 reviews)	59 (57 reviews)
Monarch: Legacy of Monsters (2023)	89% (84 reviews)	68 (26 reviews)
Godzilla x Kong: The New Empire (2024)	54% (235 reviews)	47 (51 reviews)

=== Box office performance ===
Film	Year	Box office gross revenue (est.)	Budget
Film	Year	Worldwide	Budget
Toho productions
Godzilla	1954	US$2.2 million	¥63 million ($900,000)
Godzilla Raids Again	1955	≈ ¥170 million (Japan rentals)	¥32 million
King Kong vs. Godzilla	1962	≈ $8.7 million	¥150 million ($420,000)
Mothra vs. Godzilla	1964	≈ ¥3.2 billion	¥143 million
Ghidorah, the Three-Headed Monster	1964	≈ $2.3 million (US/Japan rentals)	¥133 million
Invasion of Astro-Monster	1965	≈ $4.2 million (US/Japan rentals)	¥132 million
Ebirah, Horror of the Deep	1966	≈ ¥330 million (Japan rentals)	¥120 million
Son of Godzilla	1967	≈ ¥260 million (Japan rentals)	¥120 million
Destroy All Monsters	1968	≈ ¥230 million (Japan rentals)	¥200 million
All Monsters Attack	1969	≈ ¥260 million (Japan rentals)	—N/a
Godzilla vs. Hedorah	1971	≈ ¥300 million (Japan rentals)	¥100 million
Godzilla vs. Gigan	1972	≈ ¥320 million (Japan rentals)	≈ ¥30 million ($100,000)
Godzilla vs. Megalon	1973	≈ $5 million (United States)	≈ ¥30 million ($100,000)
Godzilla vs. Mechagodzilla	1974	≈ $17.1 million (outside Japan)	≈ ¥100 million
Terror of Mechagodzilla	1975	≈ ¥330 million (Japan rentals)	—N/a
The Return of Godzilla	1984	$14 million	$6.2 million
Godzilla vs. Biollante	1989	≈ ¥1.04 billion	¥700 million
Godzilla vs. King Ghidorah	1991	≈ ¥1.45 billion	¥1.5 billion
Godzilla vs. Mothra	1992	≈ ¥3.7 billion	¥1 billion
Godzilla vs. Mechagodzilla II	1993	≈ $36 million	¥1 billion
Godzilla vs. SpaceGodzilla	1994	≈ ¥1.65 billion	¥1 billion
Godzilla vs. Destoroyah	1995	$34.5 million	¥1 billion
Godzilla 2000: Millennium	1999	≈ $27 million	¥1–1.2 billion ($10–13 million)
Godzilla vs. Megaguirus	2000	¥1.2 billion	¥700-950 million ($7–9.5 million)
Godzilla, Mothra and King Ghidorah: Giant Monsters All-Out Attack	2001	¥2.71 billion (≈ $20 million)	¥1.1 billion
Godzilla Against Mechagodzilla	2002	$14.1 million	¥1 billion ($8.5 million)
Godzilla: Tokyo S.O.S.	2003	$10.7 million	—N/a
Godzilla: Final Wars	2004	$9.2 million	¥1.9 billion ($19.3 million)
Shin Godzilla	2016	$83.3 million	¥1.3 billion
Godzilla: Planet of the Monsters	2017	$3.2 million	—N/a
Godzilla: City on the Edge of Battle	2018	≈ ¥100 million	—N/a
Godzilla: The Planet Eater	2018	$1.5 million	—N/a
Godzilla Minus One	2023	$116 million	$10 million
Godzilla Minus Zero	2026	$105.9 million	$13–18 million
American productions
Godzilla, King of the Monsters!	1956	≈ $2 million	$100,000
Godzilla 1985	1985	≈ $4.1 million	$2 million
Godzilla	1998	$379 million	$130–150 million
Godzilla	2014	$529 million	$160 million
Godzilla: King of the Monsters	2019	$387 million	$170–200 million
Godzilla vs. Kong	2021	$470 million	$155–200 million
Godzilla x Kong: The New Empire	2024	$572 million	$135–150 million

- N/A = no known data

== Other media ==
=== Television ===
==== Japan ====
In 1973, Godzilla was featured in Toho's tokusatsu series Zone Fighter, which also featured King Ghidorah and Gigan in a few episodes. Several filmmakers who had worked on previous Godzilla films participated in the series; Tomoyuki Tanaka produced the series, directors Ishirō Honda and Jun Fukuda directed some episodes. Fukuda wrote episode four, effects director Teruyoshi Nakano contributed to the special effects, while Kōichi Kawakita (who would direct the effects for Toho's Heisei era films) served as assistant effects director.

In 1992, Toho produced a children's educational animated series titled Godzilland which featured live-action segments mixed with chibi-styled animation. In 1997, Toho produced a children's series titled Godzilla Island, centered on Godzilla toys. Toho made the series available worldwide on their official YouTube channel in November 2022. In 2018, GEMSTONE, a web content subsidiary of Toho, held a competition for filmmakers to produce short films based on the Godzilla franchise with finalists receiving a cash prize and the opportunity to work with Toho in an official capacity. One of these finalists, the puppet short Godziban, would become an ongoing YouTube web series in August 2019, with a selection of 20 episodes being offered on Amazon Prime Video and Hulu in Japan in 2024. In 2025, Toho produced another web series called Godziburst based on the toy line of the same name.

In October 2020, Toho announced Godzilla Singular Point; an anime series directed by Atsushi Takahashi, written by Toh EnJoe, and animated by Japanese studios Bones and Orange. Godzilla Singular Point aired on Japanese television in April 2021 and was released worldwide on Netflix in June 2021. Chibi Godzilla Raids Again, a short anime series produced by Toho and Pie in the sky, aired in 2023.

Year	Title	Notes
1973	Zone Fighter	The series features Godzilla in five episodes.
1992	Godzilland	
1993	Godzilland 2	
1994–1996	Get Going! Godzilland	
1997–1998	Godzilla Island	
2019–	Godziban	
2021	Godzilla Singular Point	
2023–2024	Chibi Godzilla Raids Again	
2025-present	Godziburst	

==== United States ====
Godzilla and its likeness has appeared in various television-related media, including Robot Chicken, Roseanne, Animaniacs, South Park, Malcolm In The Middle, Chappelle's Show, Rugrats, a Nike commercial with Charles Barkley battling Godzilla, and multiple appearances on The Simpsons, including a Halloween spoof titled Homerzilla.

In 1978, Hanna-Barbera produced the animated series Godzilla and ran for two seasons on NBC. In 2022, Toho made the complete Hanna-Barbera series available worldwide on their official YouTube channel. In 1991, the English dubbed versions of Ebirah, Horror of the Deep (as Godzilla vs. the Sea Monster) and Godzilla vs. Megalon were riffed on Mystery Science Theater 3000. In 1998, Columbia TriStar Television produced Godzilla: The Series; developed by Jeff Kline and Richard Raynis, the series served as a sequel to the 1998 film Godzilla and ran for two seasons on Fox Kids. In January 2022, Legendary Television announced that Apple TV+ had ordered a live-action series set in the Monsterverse titled Monarch: Legacy of Monsters.

Year	Title	Notes
1978–1979	Godzilla	Animated series In 2006, Classic Media released the first eight episodes on two volume DVD's as Godzilla: The Original Animated Series. In 2022, Toho International Inc. released the complete series on their official YouTube channel.
1998–2000	Godzilla: The Series	Animated series
2023–present	Monarch: Legacy of Monsters	

=== Attractions ===
Godzilla has been featured in several theme park attractions across Japan and been the subject of various exhibitions of suits and puppets. Monster Planet of Godzilla was a motion simulator that once ran at Sanrio Puroland in the 1990s. Universal Studios Japan featured temporary 4D film attractions based around Shin Godzilla, including a crossover with Neon Genesis Evangelion as part of their Cool Japan event. In 2019, Nijigen no Mori debuted a Shin Godzilla themed zipline experience titled "Godzilla Interception Operation" accompanied by a permanent Godzilla museum. The Eiji Tsuburaya Museum in Sukagawa, Fukushima features an exclusive short film Dream Challenge: Godzilla Appears in Sukugawa, starring the 1954 Godzilla rampaging through the effects director's hometown. The Seibu-en amusement park's Flying theater features two Godzilla ride films playing in rotation: Godzilla the Ride: Giant Monsters Ultimate Battle and Godzilla the Ride: Great Clash, which released in 2021 and 2025 respectively. Lotte World in South Korea would receive the first Godzilla attraction outside of Japan in the form of the MonsterVerse inspired Kong X Godzilla: The Ride in July 2026.

=== Video games ===
A game called Gojira-kun (which was originally going to be titled Gojiraland) was released for the MSX in 1985. In 1990, Gojira-kun: Kaijū Daikōshin was released for the Game Boy. In 1993, Super Godzilla was released for the SNES. In 2004, Godzilla: Save the Earth was released by Atari. In 2007, Godzilla: Unleashed was released for the Wii and DS. The 2014 video game Godzilla was released by Bandai Namco. In May 2022, Call of Duty: Warzone featured a cross-over event for Godzilla vs. Kong. Godzilla, Gigan, Kiryu, Destoroyah, King Ghidorah and Hedorah are playable in the Kaiju fighting game GigaBash as guest characters. Godzilla appeared in Chapter 6: Season 1 of Fortnite: Battle Royale.

=== Novels ===
A Godzilla series of novels was published by Random House during the late 1990s and the first half of 2000. The company created different series for different age groups, the Scott Ciencin series being aimed at preteens and the Marc Cerasini series being aimed at teens and young adults.

To tie-in with the 2014 film, three books were published. Titan Books published a novelization of the film in May 2014, written by Greg Cox. The graphic novel Godzilla: Awakening by Max Borenstein, Greg Borenstein and Eric Battle served as a prequel, and Godzilla: The Art of Destruction by Mark Cotta told about the making of the film.

=== Comics ===
Several manga have been derived from specific Godzilla films and both Marvel and Dark Horse have published Godzilla comic book series (1977–1979 and 1987–1999, respectively). In 2011, IDW Publishing started a new series, Godzilla: Kingdom of Monsters (published in book form under the same title), rebooting the Godzilla story. It was followed by two sequel series, Godzilla (published in book form as Godzilla: History's Greatest Monster) and Godzilla: Rulers of Earth (published in book form as Godzilla: Complete Rulers of Earth Volume 1 and Godzilla: Complete Rulers of Earth Volume 2), as well as seven five-issue miniseries to date.

Godzilla has been referenced in The Simpsons comics on three separate occasions. The character is featured in Bart Simpson's Guide to Life where it and other kaiju characters such as Minilla and King Ghidorah can be seen; it is featured in the comic "An Anime Among Us!" and K-Bart. Godzilla is also featured in the comic Bart Simpson's Treehouse of Horror 7 where it and other kaiju can be seen referenced on the front cover.

=== Music ===
Godzilla: The Album, the soundtrack album of Godzilla (1998), sold 2.5 million copies worldwide. The album's lead single, "Come with Me" by Puff Daddy featuring Jimmy Page, sold a certified 2.025 million copies worldwide. Its Japan-exclusive single, "Lose Control" by Japanese rock band L'Arc-en-Ciel, sold 938,401 copies in Japan. Shin Godzilla Ongakushuu, the soundtrack album of Shin Godzilla (2016), sold 43,951 copies in Japan. Mars (1991), an album by the Japanese rock duo B'z featuring a Godzilla-themed song, sold 1,730,500 copies in Japan.

Blue Öyster Cult released the song "Godzilla" in 1977. It was the first track, and the second of four singles, from their fifth studio album Spectres (also 1977). Artists such as Fu Manchu, Racer X and Double Experience have included cover versions of this song on their albums. American musician Michale Graves wrote a song titled "Godzilla" for his 2005 album Punk Rock Is Dead. The lyrics mention Godzilla and several on-screen adversaries such as Mothra, Hedorah, Destoroyah and Gigan. The Brazilian heavy metal band Sepultura has a song titled "Biotech is Godzilla" on its 1993 release Chaos A.D.

Composer Eric Whitacre wrote a piece for wind ensemble titled "Godzilla Eats Las Vegas!" The work was commissioned by Thomas Leslie of the University of Nevada, Las Vegas and was premiered in 1996 by the university's wind band. Annotations on the score instruct performers to dress in costume and a "script" is provided for the audience. Since the piece's premiere, it has been performed by notable ensembles including the United States Marine Band and the Scottish National Wind Symphony.

The French extreme metal band Gojira named the band after Godzilla's name in Japanese. The song "Simon Says" by Pharoahe Monch is a hip-hop remix of the "Godzilla March" theme song. The instrumental version of this song was notably used in the 2000 film Charlie's Angels. The British band Lostprophets released a song called "We Are Godzilla, You Are Japan" on its second studio album Start Something. The American punk band Groovie Ghoulies released a song called "Hats off to You (Godzilla)" as a tribute to Godzilla. It is featured on the EP Freaks on Parade released in 2002.

The American artist Doctor Steel released a song called 'Atomic Superstar' about Godzilla on his album People of Earth in 2002. In 2003, the British singer Siouxsie Sioux released the album Hái! with her band The Creatures; the album had a Japanese theme with a song dedicated to the monster, simply titled "Godzilla!". The record label Shifty issued the compilation album Destroysall with 15 songs from 15 bands, ranging from hardcore punk to doom-laden death metal. Not all of the songs are dedicated to Godzilla, but all do appear connected to monsters from Toho Studios. Fittingly, the disc was released on August 1, 2003, the 35th anniversary of the Japanese release of Destroy All Monsters.

King Geedorah (a.k.a. MF Doom) released Take Me to Your Leader, a hip-hop album featuring guests from the group Monsta Island Czars, another Godzilla-themed hip-hop group. These albums include multiple Godzilla samples throughout the series. Taiwanese American electronic musician Mochipet released the EP Godzilla Rehab Center on August 21, 2012, featuring songs named after monsters in the series including Gigan, King Ghidorah, Moguera and Hedorah.

In 2019, American rock band Think Sanity released their debut album featuring songs based on Godzilla, Mothra, and Hedorah. The songs are titled "Sad Kaiju", "Mothra", and "Sludge", respectively. The monsters are also mentioned by name on the track "News at Six" in which they are comically described by newscaster Chip Bentley as destroying a nearby town. The band has mentioned in interviews that they have also written songs based on Biollante, King Ghidorah, and Rodan as well.

=== Geographic features ===
The largest megamullion, located 600 kilometres to the south-east of Okinotorishima, the southernmost Japanese island, is named the Godzilla Megamullion. The Japan Coast Guard played a role in name, reaching an agreement with Toho who owns the rights to Godzilla. Toho's Chief Godzilla officer Keiji Ota stated that "I am truly honored that (the megamullion) bears Godzilla's name, the Earth's most powerful monster."

== Cultural impact ==
Godzilla is one of the most recognizable symbols of Japanese popular culture worldwide and is an important facet of Japanese films, embodying the kaiju subset of the tokusatsu genre. It has been considered an allegory of nuclear weapons. The earlier Godzilla films, especially the original Godzilla, portrayed Godzilla as a frightening, nuclear monster. Godzilla represented the fears that many Japanese held about the nuclear attacks on Hiroshima and Nagasaki and the possibility of recurrence.

As the series progressed, so did Godzilla, changing into a less destructive and more heroic character. Ghidorah, the Three-Headed Monster (1964) was the turning point in Godzilla's transformation from villain to hero, by pitting him against a greater threat to humanity, King Ghidorah. Godzilla has since been viewed as an anti-hero. Roger Ebert cites Godzilla as a notable example of a villain-turned-hero, along with King Kong, the James Bond films' Jaws, the Terminator, and Rambo.

Godzilla is considered "the original radioactive superhero" due to his accidental radioactive origin story predating Spider-Man (1962 debut), though Godzilla did not become a hero until Ghidorah in 1964. By the 1970s, Godzilla came to be viewed as a superhero, with the magazine King of the Monsters in 1977 describing Godzilla as "Superhero of the '70s." In 1973, Godzilla was voted the most popular movie monster in The Monster Times poll, beating Count Dracula, King Kong, Wolf Man, The Mummy, Creature From the Black Lagoon, and Frankenstein's monster.

In 2010, the Sea Shepherd Conservation Society named their most recently acquired scout vessel MV Gojira. Toho, the people in charge of the Godzilla franchise, served them with a notice to remove the name and in response the boat's name was changed in May 2011 to MV Brigitte Bardot.

Steven Spielberg cited Godzilla as an inspiration for Jurassic Park (1993), specifically Godzilla, King of the Monsters! (1956), which he grew up watching. During its production, Spielberg described Godzilla as "the most masterful of all the dinosaur movies because it made you believe it was really happening." Godzilla also influenced the Spielberg film Jaws (1975). Godzilla has also been cited as an inspiration by actor Tim Allen and filmmakers Martin Scorsese and Tim Burton.

=== Awards ===
==== Won ====
- 1954 Japan Movie Association Awards – Special Effects (Godzilla (1954))
- 1966 Japan Academy Award – Special Effects (Invasion of Astro-Monster)
- 1986 Japan Academy Award – Special Effects and Newcomer of the Year (The Return of Godzilla)
- 1986 Razzie Awards – Worst Supporting Actor and Worst New Star (The Return of Godzilla)
- 1992 Japan Academy Award – Special Effects (Godzilla vs. King Ghidorah)
- 1993 Tokyo Sports Movie Awards – Best Leading Actor (Godzilla vs. Mothra)
- 1993 Best Grossing Films Award – Golden Award and Money-Making Star Award (Godzilla vs. Mothra)
- 1993 Japan Academy Award – Best Score (Godzilla vs. Mothra)
- 1994 Japan Academy Award – Best Score (Godzilla vs. Mechagodzilla II)
- 1995 Best Grossing Films Award – Silver Award (Godzilla vs. SpaceGodzilla)
- 1996 Best Grossing Films Award – Golden Award (Godzilla vs. Destoroyah)
- 1996 Japan Academy Award – Special Effects (Godzilla vs. Destoroyah)
- 1996 MTV Movie Awards – Lifetime Achievement*
- 1998 Golden Raspberry Awards – Worst Supporting Actress and Worst Remake or Sequel (Godzilla (1998))
- 1999 Saturn Awards – Best Special Effects (Godzilla (1998))
- 2001 Saturn Awards – Best Home Video Release (Godzilla 2000)
- 2002 Best Grossing Films Award – Silver Award (Godzilla, Mothra and King Ghidorah: Giant Monsters All-Out Attack)
- 2004 Hollywood Walk of Fame. – (Godzilla: Final Wars)
- 2007 Saturn Awards – Best DVD Classic Film Release (Godzilla (1954))
- 2014 22nd Annual Japan Cool Content Contribution Award (Godzilla (2014))
- 2017 40th Japan Academy Prize – Best Picture, Best Director, Cinematography, Lighting Direction, Art Direction, Sound Recording, Film Editing (Shin Godzilla)
- 2017 11th Asian Film Awards – Best Visual Effects (Shin Godzilla)
- 2021 21st Golden Trailer Awards – Best Fantasy Adventure TV Spot for a Feature Film ( Godzilla: King of the Monsters)
- 2022 47th Saturn Awards – Best Special Effects (Godzilla vs. Kong)
- 2024 17th Asian Film Awards – Best Sound and Best Visual Effects (Godzilla Minus One)
- 2024 47th Japan Academy Film Prize – Best Picture, Best Screenplay (Yamazaki), Best Supporting Actress (Sakura Ando), Best Cinematography, Best Lighting Direction, Best Art Direction, Best Sound Recording and Best Film Editing (Godzilla Minus One)
- 2024 96th Academy Awards – Best Visual Effects (Godzilla Minus One)

(*) In 1996 Godzilla received an award for Lifetime Achievement at the MTV Movie Awards. Creator and producer Shōgo Tomiyama accepted on his behalf via satellite and was joined by "Godzilla" himself.

==== Nominations ====
- 2022 20th Visual Effects Society Awards – Outstanding Visual Effects in a Photoreal Feature, Outstanding Virtual Cinematography in a CG Project, Outstanding Effects Simulations in a Photoreal Feature (Godzilla vs. Kong)
- 2024 22nd Visual Effects Society Awards – Outstanding Animated Character in a Photoreal Feature for"Godzilla" (Godzilla Minus One)
- 2024 22nd Visual Effects Society Awards – Outstanding Visual Effects in a Photoreal Episode (Monarch: Legacy of Monsters)
- 2026 78th Primetime Creative Arts Emmy Awards – Outstanding Special Visual Effects in a Season or a Movie (Monarch: Legacy of Monsters)

=== Name usage ===
"-zilla" is a well-known slang suffix, used to imply some form of excess to a person, object or theme; some examples being the reality TV show Bridezillas and the Netscape-derived web browser Mozilla Firefox.

== See also ==
- List of films featuring dinosaurs
- List of films featuring giant monsters
- Kaiju
- Tokusatsu
- Godzilla
- King Kong (franchise)
- Gamera
- MonsterVerse
- Mothra
- Rodan
- King Ghidorah
