= Godzilla Minus Zero (soundtrack) =

2026 film soundtrack album

Godzilla Minus Zero (Original Motion Picture Soundtrack)

Film score by Naoki Satō
- Released: November 6, 2026
- Recorded: July 10–September 8, 2026
- Studios: Sound Inn Studios; Toho Studios Recording Stage
- Genre: Film score
- Length: 76:38
- Labels: Toho; Rambling Records; Milan Records
- Producer: Naoki Satō

Naoki Satō chronology
| Black Showman (2026) | Godzilla Minus Zero (2026) |

Godzilla Minus Zero (Original Motion Picture Soundtrack) is the soundtrack album to the 2026 kaiju film Godzilla Minus Zero, written and directed by Takashi Yamazaki, which is the sequel to Godzilla Minus One (2023) and the 39th film in the Godzilla franchise. The score is composed by Yamazaki's frequent collaborator Naoki Satō and the album accompanied 16 tracks which was released on November 6, 2026. It was distributed by Rambling Records in Japan, and Milan Records internationally. The vinyl edition of the album is scheduled to be released in December.

== Background and recording ==
Yamazaki's frequent collaborator Naoki Satō composed the score for Minus Zero after doing so for the predecessor. The score was recorded at the Sound Inn Studios and Toho Studios Recording Stage in Japan, featuring an 80-piece orchestra consisted of violin, viola, cello, double bass, brass, trombone, tuba, woodwind and horn. The recording sessions were held from July 10 to September 8. Satō confirmed the sessions through his social media account. The score directly incorporates Akira Ifukube's Godzilla theme and utilizes heavy and grand orchestral elements.

== Release ==
The soundtrack to Godzilla Minus Zero was announced in October, and was released through Rambling Records in Japan, and Milan Records internationally on November 6, 2026, while a limited edition of vinyl LPs is scheduled to be released on December 11.

== Reception ==
Zanobard Reviews rated the score 7/10 out and summarized, "Naoki Sato continues the darkly imposing sound of Godzilla Minus One pretty rigorously with their score for sequel Minus Zero, but between the intense reliance on eerie atmosphere and straight re-recordings of some cues, there's just not a lot to remark on compared to the first score." Jessica Kiang of Sight and Sound called it a "soaring, swooping score from Sato Naoki". David Rooney of The Hollywood Reporter wrote "the score by another repeat collaborator, Naoki Sato, is a marvel, ranging from brooding apprehension, with solemn choral elements, to thunderous symphonic bursts for the big clashes."

Robert Daniels of Screen International wrote "Naoki Satō's seismic score also rises to the challenge, shaking the frame with colossal horns and booming percussion that build with a Jaws-esque intensity." Rory Doherty of Dread Central wrote "The first piece of score we hear in Godzilla Minus Zero – stabs of shrill, alarming strings courtesy of the tremendous Naoki Sato [...] makes it clear that our titular atomic monster is sharing the spotlight [on a sonic level]." Katie Rife of Inverse called it an "excellent, evocative score". Nick Schager of The Daily Beast called it a "blaringly ominous score".

== Track listing ==
| No. | Title | Length |
|---|---|---|
| 1. | "Eclipse" | 5:29 |
| 2. | "Witness" | 2:06 |
| 3. | "Contingency" | 3:35 |
| 4. | "Remnant" | 3:04 |
| 5. | "Bearer" | 4:19 |
| 6. | "Burden" | 2:10 |
| 7. | "Narukami" | 6:01 |
| 8. | "Resonance" | 8:28 |
| 9. | "Devotion" | 8:30 |
| 10. | "Possession" | 2:26 |
| 11. | "Fortitude" | 2:48 |
| 12. | "Farewell" | 1:46 |
| 13. | "Divine" | 5:34 |
| 14. | "Resolution" | 5:10 |
| 15. | "The Road Ahead" | 13:03 |
| 16. | "Godzilla Suite" | 2:09 |
| Total length: | | 76:38 |

== Release history ==
Release dates and formats for Godzilla Minus Zero (Original Soundtrack)
| Region | Date | Format(s) | Label | Ref. |
|---|---|---|---|---|
| Japan | November 6, 2026 | Digital download; streaming | Rambling | |
| Japan | December 11, 2026 | Vinyl | Rambling | |
| International | November 6, 2026 | Digital download; streaming | Milan | |
| International | December 11, 2026 | Vinyl | Milan | |

== See also ==
- Godzilla Minus One (soundtrack)
