= Miho Yoshioka (tarento) =

Japanese model and actor

- 吉岡 美穂
- Born: 3 February 1980 (age 46); Higashiōsaka, Osaka Prefecture, Japan
- Occupations: Tarento; actress; gravure idol
- Years active: 2000–
- Spouse: Izam (m. 2006; div. 2026)
- Children: 3
- Modeling information
- Height: 169 cm (5 ft 7 in) (2006)
- Agency: One Eight Promotion

Miho Yoshioka (吉岡 美穂, Yoshioka Miho; born 3 February 1980) is a Japanese tarento, actress, and former gravure idol who has appeared in a number of television series and variety shows as well as feature films. Her real name is Miho Hine (日根 美穂, Hine Miho).

She was born in Higashiōsaka, Osaka Prefecture. She is represented with the agency One Eight Promotion.

== Awards ==
Year	Ceremony	Award	Result
2001	1st Race Queen Of The Year	Award	Won
2002	40th Golden Arrow Awards	Graph Award	Won

== Filmography ==
=== Television ===
==== Dramas ====
Dates	Title	Role	Network	Notes	Ref.
Oct–Dec 2002	Mokuyō Drama You're Under Arrest	Saori Saga	EX		
Sep 2002	Shinya Series Drama P na Kanojo Dai 3 Series	Minako Goto	TBS	Lead role	
Jul–Sep 2003	Kunimitsu no Matsuri	Sayuri Yoshinaga	CX	Produced by KTV	
Oct–Dec 2003	Doyō Drama Ashita Tenki ni nāre.	Haruka Kurio	NTV		
Apr–Jun 2004	Mokuyō Drama Denchi ga Kireru made	Maiko Honjo	EX		
Oct–Dec 2004	Mokuyō Drama Seicho Matsumoto: Kurokawa no Techō	Sue Konno	EX		
Jan–Mar 2004	Shinya Drama Division 1 "miracle"	Kaho Nonaka	CX		
Jan–Mar 2005	Nichiyō Gekijō Tragedy of "M"	Hitomi Nakanishi	TBS		
2005	Koisuru Nichiyōbi Second Series Aenai Yoru o Dakishimete	Aya Nagai	BS-TBS	Lead role	
Dec 2005 – Feb 2006	Miho mini drama	Miho	MBS		
Feb 2006 –	Gekidan Engisha. 16th Nervous na Mushimushi	Hikako Tamai	CX		
Mar 2006	Ai to Shi o mitsumete	Policewoman	EX		

==== Information, variety programme regular ====
Dates	Title	Network	Notes
	Interstitial programme Orange Page no Ryōri no iroha	EX	
Apr 2002 – Mar 2006	Yuji Miyake no Doshirōto	NTV	Produced by KRY
Apr–Sep 2002	Late night programme Honnō no High Kick!	CX	
	Geinōjin ga Kayou Shinsatsu-shitsu	NTV	
	Interstitial programme Gohan ga susumu Hot Table	EX	
Oct 2005 –	Yukihira Miyane no Kuchikomī!?	TVO	
30 Mar – 2 Oct 2009	Omoikkiri Don!	NTV	As Don! Don! Poshlet
5 Oct 2009 – 26 Mar 2010	Omoikkiri Don! Part 1: Omoikkiri Don!	NTV	As Don! Don! Poshlet
29 Mar 2010 – 30 Sep 2011	Pon!	NTV	As Don! Don! Poshlet
2013	Watashi no Nani ga Ike nai no?	TBS	Appearing with Izam as quasi-regular

==== Other programmes ====
Dates	Title	Network	Notes
2002–03	Italia-Go Kaiwa	NHK E	Student
Apr 2003 – Dec 2004	Horse race expected programme Ashita no G	CX	Programme navigator (moderator)
31 May 2009	Ai no Shura Bara	YTV	Kansai and Chūkyō local; appeared with her husband Izam

=== Films ===
Date	Title	Distributor	Role	Director	Creator	Co-stars	Notes
Oct 2003	Ganryujima		Kame	Seiji Chiba		Masahiro Motoki, Atsushi Tamura, Masahiko Nishimura, Toshio Kakei	First film appearance
Dec 2003	Godzilla: Tokyo S.O.S.	Toho	Azusa Kisaragi	Masaaki Tezuka		Noboru Kaneko, Akira Nakao, Ko Takasugi, Masami Nagasawa	
May 2005	Karaoke -Jinsei Kamihitoe-	Excellent Film/Libero	Yoko Muraoka	Hiroyuki Tsuji	Eiji Oshita	Manabu Oshio, Ryudo Uzaki, Shigeru Muroi, Shihori Kanjiya	Heroine
Jul 2006	Caonne	Caonne Production Committee	Maria Hidaka	Izam		Ayano Fujisawa, Taishu Kase, Takahiro Hōjō, Ranran Suzuki	
Sep 2006	Sun Scarred	Cinema Paradise	Kaori Katayama	Takashi Miike		Show Aikawa, Aiko Sato, Toru Kazama, Shin Takuma	
Jan 2007	26 Years Diary	Sony Pictures Entertainment Japan	Asako Tojima	Junji Hanado		Lee Tae-sung, Mākii, Naoto Takenaka, Takatoshi Kaneko	

=== Direct-to-video ===
Year	Title	Publisher	Role	Director	Co-stars	Original author	Notes
2006	Tonarinokai: Ichi-dan: Flame	Warner Home Video	Tatsuya's wife	Takeshi Yokoi	Tomoya Shiroishi, Mai Minami, Hirokatsu Kihara	Hirokatsu Kihara	Her character's name was not mentioned in the work

=== Radio programme regular ===
Dates	Title	Networks
Apr–Sep 2001	Ore-tachi ××× yatte masu Getsuyōbi	MBS Radio
Jan 2003 –	Bodywild Present Miho Yoshioka no Wild de Yukō	FM Osaka, Tokyo FM
May–Sep 2003	Oshaberi yatte masu Getsuyōbi	K'z Station
Oct 2003 – Mar 2004	Ore-tachi Hero	MBS Radio
Apr–Sep 2004	Young Park Enchō-sen Tren Donburi	MBS Radio
Oct 2004 – Mar 2005	Nihon Escon Miho Yoshioka: Sugao de Sweet Room	NBS
Oct 2004 – Sep 2005	Hyper Night Doyō: Do-Mi-Ho	CBC Radio
Oct 2004 – Mar 2005	Young Park Enchō-sen 2-ji made Seifū tōron	MBS Radio
Apr–Sep 2005	Shakariki! Enchō-sen V3	MBS Radio
Oct 2005 – Jan 2007	Gocha maze'! Kin Spe	MBS Radio

=== Advertisements ===
Dates	Product	Notes
2000	Suntory "D Hi Komachi"	
Jul–Dec 2000	Wacoal	
2001	Trimp International Japan	Underwear campaign girl
Jul–Sep 2001	Spa World "Spa Pooh"	Image character
Apr–Dec 2002	Media "0060 Emu-den 6-en denwa"	
Sep 2002 –	Aderans	
Sep 2002 –	Nissin Foods "Men no Tatsujin"	
Oct 2002 – Sep 2003	Fujifilm compact camera "silvi F2.8"	
Jan–Dec 2003	Coca-Cola "Georgia"	
Jan–Dec 2003	Ashihara "Jewelry Kakushu"	
2003–04	NTT Resonant "goo"	
Mar–May 2003	The General Insurance Association of Japan "Promotion of Automobile Liability Insurance"	
Apr 2003 – Mar 2004	Gunze "Body Wild"	
Nov 2003 –	CA Capital Internet Rental Transaction "Gaika ex"	
Feb 2004 –	Lion Corporation "Between Ha Brush"	
Apr 2005 –	Mayaku Kakusei-zai Ran'yō Bōshi Center "Dame. Zettai."	Image character
Apr 2005 –	New Energy Foundation "Promotion of Introduction of Solar Power Generation for Residential Use"	Image character
Aug 2005 –	Starts Publishing "Koi Bana"	
2006 –	Cosmo Oil Company "Cosmo Station"	

== Works ==
=== Image videos ===
Date	Title	Publisher
Jan 2001	it's my color	Pony Canyon
Aug 2001	Fatina	Takeshobo
Jan 2002	Amai Seikatsu	DigiCube
Jun 2002	Varian	Shogakukan
Nov 2002	Zutto soba ni ite...	DigiCube
Apr 2003	digital Playboy vol.3	Shueisha
Mar 2004	24Gold	Liverpool

== Bibliography ==
Date	Title	Publisher	Photographer	Notes
Jun 2000	Miho	Ōzora Shuppan	Shoken Takahashi	
Jan 2001	clover	Bunkasha	Daichi Gunji	
May 2001	A-B-L-E		Sadahiro Aida	Omnibus photo album
Oct 2001	Inner Angel	Book Man-sha	Yasuo Whirui	
Dec 2001	Aru Hareta Hi ni	Shogakukan	Koki Nishida	
Apr 2002	Weekly Young Sunday special graphic vol.1 Miho Yoshioka	Shogakukan	Koki Nishida	
Aug 2002	Ride	Wani Books	Yasuo Whirui	
Jul 2002	Gekkan: Miho Yoshioka	Shinchosha	Meisa Fujishiro	
Mar 2003	M	Shogakukan	Koki Nishida	
Jul 2004	Novel	Shogakukan		
Jul 2005	A Place In The Sun	Wani Books	Shuichi Maiyama	

== See also ==
- Gravure idol
