= Godzilla Against Mechagodzilla =

2002 film by Masaaki Tezuka

- Theatrical release poster

Japanese name
- Katakana: ゴジラ×メカゴジラ
Transcriptions
- Revised Hepburn: Gojira tai Mekagojira
- Directed by: Masaaki Tezuka
- Written by: Wataru Mimura
- Produced by: Shogo Tomiyama; Takahide Morichi
- Starring: Yumiko Shaku; Shin Takuma; Koh Takasugi; Yūsuke Tomoi; Kumi Mizuno; Akira Nakao
- Cinematography: Masahiro Kishimoto
- Edited by: Shinichi Fushima
- Music by: Michiru Ōshima
- Production company: Toho Pictures
- Distributed by: Toho
- Release date: December 14, 2002 (Japan)
- Running time: 88 minutes
- Country: Japan
- Language: Japanese
- Budget: ¥1 billion ($8.5 million)
- Box office: $14.4 million (Note: Godzilla Against Mechagodzilla's worldwide box office: Japan – $14,122,958; 2022 U.S. one-day release – $335,000)

Godzilla Against Mechagodzilla (Japanese: ゴジラ×メカゴジラ, Hepburn: Gojira tai Mekagojira) is a 2002 Japanese kaiju film directed by Masaaki Tezuka, with special effects by Yūichi Kikuchi. Distributed by Toho and produced under their subsidiary Toho Pictures, it is the 27th film in the Godzilla franchise and the fourth film in the franchise's Millennium period, and is also Toho's 26th Godzilla film. The film features Godzilla, along with an updated version of the mecha character Mechagodzilla, who is referred to in the film by its codename MFS-3 Kiryu. The film stars Yumiko Shaku, Shin Takuma, Kou Takasugi, Yuusuke Tomoi, Kumi Mizuno, and Akira Nakao, with Tsutomu Kitagawa as Godzilla and Hirofumi Ishigaki as Kiryu. The film follows Akane Yashiro, who must pilot the cyborg mecha created from the skeleton of the first Godzilla in the attempt to prevent Godzilla from attacking Japan.

Rather than continuing the format of the other films in the Millennium era of ignoring the events of every instalment in the Godzilla film series aside from the original 1954 Godzilla, Godzilla Against Mechagodzilla takes place within a continuity that alludes to some of Toho's Shōwa-era kaiju films. A direct sequel, Godzilla: Tokyo S.O.S., was released on December 13, 2003.

== Plot ==
Forty-five years after the first Godzilla's attack and death, (Note: As depicted in the 1954 self-titled film.) maser-cannon technician lieutenant Akane Yashiro of Anti-Megalosaurus Force (AMF) is unable to kill a new member of Godzilla's species during her first fight with him at Tateyama. During the battle, she panics and accidentally knocks a jeep off the road, where Godzilla steps on it, killing her comrades inside.

As a result, Akane is demoted while scientists, including single father Tokumitsu Yuhara, are gathered to build a cyborg mecha from the first Godzilla's skeleton. In time, the cyborg codenamed "MFS-3 Kiryu" is finished and inducted into the Japan Xenomorph Self-Defense Forces (JXSDF) along with its human pilots, the Kiryu Squadron, with Akane as the primary pilot. However, memories of her actions during the first battle still linger as one of her squadron mates, 2nd lieutenant Susumu Hayama, hates her because his brother was among those killed.

Four years later, Kiryu is unveiled in a global presentation where its remote systems, use of command aircraft, and Absolute Zero Cannon are shown. Simultaneously, Godzilla returns in Yokohama and Kiryu is launched into battle. In the midst of this, however, Godzilla's roar causes Kiryu to experience memories of its past life and go berserk while Godzilla retreats. The horrified Kiryu Squadron is powerless to stop the rampaging Kiryu until it runs out of energy and is brought back to headquarters for repairs.

Meanwhile, Akane deals with Hayama's attempts to make her leave and Yuhara's attempts to get to know her despite her desiring solitude, though she begins to develop a bond with Yuhara's young daughter Sara. As Godzilla mounts another attack in Shinagawa, the repaired Kiryu is deployed and confronts Godzilla once more. Kiryu gains the upper hand, but as it prepares the Absolute Zero Cannon, Godzilla knocks Kiryu away with his atomic breath and diverts the blast. With Kiryu disabled and the remote piloting system offline, Akane orders Hayama to land his command craft so that she can use Kiryu's internal backup cockpit. Before she leaves, Hayama wishes her luck, forgiving her.

Piloting Kiryu directly, Akane closes in on Godzilla, hoping to use the Absolute Zero Cannon at point-blank range. As the two monsters collide, Akane uses Kiryu's thrusters to propel them out to the ocean before firing. In the aftermath, an injured Godzilla retreats while Kiryu is heavily damaged. With Kiryu successful in repelling Godzilla, it is taken back to base for repairs.

In a post-credits scene, Akane agrees to have dinner with the Yuharas and salutes Kiryu.

== Cast ==
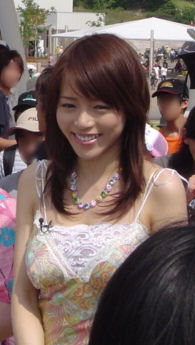
Yumiko Shaku, pictured in 2005, portrays Akane Yashiro, one of the film's main protagonists

- Yumiko Shaku as Akane Yashiro, the member of Kiryu Squadron and the operator of Kiryu.
- Shin Takuma as Tokumitsu Yuhara, Sara's single father.
- Kana Onodera as Sara Yuhara, Tokumitsu's daughter.
- Kou Takasugi as Togashi, the lieutenant of Kiryu Squadron.
- Akira Nakao as Hayato Igarashi, the current Prime Minister of Japan and the former Minister of Science and Technology. Nakao previously portrayed Takaaki Aso in Heisei-era Godzilla film series.
- Yūsuke Tomoi as Susumu Hayama, the lieutenant of Kiryu Squadron and one of pilots of Heron.
- Junichi Mizuno as Kenji Sekine, the lieutenant of Kiryu Squadron and one of pilots of Heron.
- Kumi Mizuno as Machiko Tsuge, Prime Minister of Japan.
- Yoshikazu Kanō as Hishinuma
- Takeo Nakahara as Ichiyanagi, staff sergeant
- Kōichi Ueda as Dobashi, the director general of the Defense Agency.
- Midori Hagio as Kaori Yamada, microwave scientist.
- Akira Shirai as Shinji Akamatsu, robotics engineer.
- Naomasa Musaka as Goro Kanno, the low temperature physicist.
- Katsuo Nakamura as Yasushi Torisawa
- Tsutomu Kitagawa as Godzilla, the mutant dinosaurian creature.
  - Kitagawa also portrays the first Godzilla, the original form of MFS-3 Kiryu in the flashback.
- Hirofumi Ishigaki as Mechagodzilla, also known by its codename "MFS-3 Kiryu", the cyborg version of the first Godzilla.

Hideki Matsui makes a cameo as himself and Shinji Morisue portrays Hayama's older brother who got killed by Godzilla in 1999.

== Production ==
Following the successful revival of the monsters Mothra and King Ghidorah the previous year, Toho elected to bring back Mechagodzilla for the next installment in the Godzilla franchise. Unlike previous iterations of Mechagodzilla, this version is mostly referred to by the name Kiryu (derived from Kikai-ryu, the Japanese word for "machine dragon") throughout the film. This was done to differentiate the character from previous versions. It was, however, referred to as "Mecha-G" and "Mechagodzilla" in the English dubbing of the next film, Godzilla: Tokyo S.O.S..

Japanese baseball star Hideki Matsui has a cameo as himself in the film, due to his nickname "Godzilla".

As has been done since the early 1970s, Toho had the international version of Godzilla Against Mechagodzilla dubbed in Hong Kong. This dubbed version was released on DVD by Sony Pictures Home Entertainment in 2004.

=== Soundtrack ===
Godzilla Against Mechagodzilla the first film of the series with a soundtrack recorded outside of Japan. Director Masaaki Tezuka once again turned to composer Michiru Oshima following their successful collaboration on Godzilla vs. Megaguirus, with the score itself being recorded by Moscow International Symphonic Orchestra, under conductor Konstantin D. Krimets. Tezuka and Oshima would both return for the film's sequel, Godzilla: Tokyo S.O.S.

== Release ==
=== Theatrical ===
Godzilla Against Mechagodzilla was released in Japan on 14 December 2002. The film was later released in select theaters in the United States for one day on November 3, 2022 via Fathom Events to commemorate the franchise's 68th anniversary, dubbed "Godzilla Day." It pulled $335,000 for the latter release, a respectable gross for a film released only for a single night with no major advertisement beforehand.

=== Home media ===
The film was released by Sony Pictures/Columbia Tristar Home Entertainment on DVD on March 23, 2004. It was released under the American title, Godzilla Against MechaGodzilla - International Version, which has new English opening and closing credits but is otherwise the same as the original Japanese version.

Its second release was on Blu-ray by Sony as part of the Toho Godzilla Collection. and was released on September 9, 2014 as part of a 2-disc double feature with Godzilla, Mothra and King Ghidorah: Giant Monsters All-Out Attack.

=== Critical response ===
Reviews of Godzilla Against Mechagodzilla have been positive. Mike Pinsky of DVD Talk gave the film three stars out of five, saying: "While I did have some minor complaints, [this is] a fine entry in the series." Pinsky said "the plot is more interesting than most giant monster movies," and "the battle scenes, which are the main reason anyone watches these films to begin with, were great." Giving the film a "B+" score, Mark Zimmer of Digitally Obsessed said that it's "a good deal of fun and one of the better entries in the series." Digital Monster Island gave the film a "B" score, calling it "a fun and exciting film that should please most kaiju fans."
