= Godzilla: Tokyo S.O.S. =

2003 film by Masaaki Tezuka

- Japanese theatrical release poster

Japanese name
- Katakana: ゴジラ×モスラ×メカゴジラ 東京SOS
Transcriptions
- Revised Hepburn: Gojira x Mothra x Mechagojira: Tōkyō S.O.S.
- Directed by: Masaaki Tezuka
- Written by: Masaaki Tezuka; Masahiro Yokotani
- Produced by: Shogo Tomiyama
- Starring: Noboru Kaneko; Miho Yoshioka; Mitsuki Koga; Masami Nagasawa; Chihiro Otsuka; Koh Takasugi; Hiroshi Koizumi; Akira Nakao
- Cinematography: Yoshinori Sekiguchi
- Edited by: Shinichi Fushima
- Music by: Michiru Ōshima
- Production company: Toho Pictures
- Distributed by: Toho
- Release date: 13 December 2003
- Running time: 91 minutes
- Country: Japan
- Language: Japanese
- Box office: $10.7 million

Godzilla: Tokyo S.O.S. (ゴジラ×モスラ×メカゴジラ 東京SOS, Gojira x Mothra x Mechagojira: Tōkyō S.O.S.) is a 2003 Japanese kaiju film and the direct sequel to Godzilla Against Mechagodzilla (2002). The film was directed by Masaaki Tezuka with special effects by Eiichi Asada. Distributed by Toho and produced under their subsidiary Toho Pictures, it is the 28th film in the Godzilla franchise, the fifth film in the franchise's Millennium series, the 27th Godzilla film produced by Toho. Set one year after the events of the previous film, Godzilla: Tokyo S.O.S. follows the Shobijin request the Chujos that the first Godzilla's skeleton must return to the ocean due humanity's usage of Kiryu violating the natural orders, while Mothra and Kiryu attempt to prevent Godzilla from attacking Tokyo.

Godzilla: Tokyo S.O.S. stars Noboru Kaneko, Miho Yoshioka, Mitsuki Koga, Masami Nagasawa, Chihiro Otsuka, Kou Takasugi, Hiroshi Koizumi (in his final film appearance), and Akira Nakao, with Tsutomu Kitagawa as Godzilla and Motokuni Nakagawa as Mechagodzilla/Kiryu (replaces Hirofumi Ishigaki from the previous film). This film also shares connections with the original 1961 Mothra film (with Koizumi reprises his role from the aforementioned film) and Space Amoeba (with Kamoebas making a cameo as a corpse).

Around its theatrical release, it was accompanied by a Hamtaro double feature, Hamtaro: Miracle in Aurora Valley.

The following entry in the series, Godzilla: Final Wars, which is set in its own continuity, was released on December 4, 2004.

== Plot ==
The Shobijin visit the elderly Shinichi Chujo, his scientist nephew Yoshito, and his grandson Shun to warn them that Godzilla continues returning to Japan because the Japanese government used the first Godzilla's skeleton in the cyborg MFS-3 Kiryu's construction. (Note: As depicted in Godzilla Against Mechagodzilla. (2002)) If the government returns the skeleton to the ocean, Mothra, the descendant of the first Mothra who attacked Japan forty-three years ago, (Note: As depicted in her 1961 self-titled film.) will take Kiryu's place in defending Japan.

As Kiryu undergoes repair and modifications, the Kiryu squadron is sent to the United States for further training, with Kyosuke Akiba taking Akane Yashiro's place should Godzilla return while she is away. Due to the first Mothra's attack, Japanese prime minister Hayato Igarashi denies Chujo's request, but agrees to discontinue the Kiryu project once the cyborg exterminates Godzilla. Sometime later, Godzilla resurfaces to attack Tokyo despite his injuries sustained since the last battle with Kiryu. Chujo and Shun summon Mothra to battle Godzilla. With the repairs finished, the government deploys Kiryu, but Godzilla knocks both it and Mothra out, injuring Chujo and Shun during the fray.

Meanwhile, on Himago Island, the uncharted volcanic island in Ogasawara island chain, twin Mothra larvae hatch from their egg and rush to help their mother. As Yoshito, with help from the Shobijin, uses a maintenance hatch to enter and repair Kiryu from its internal backup cockpit, the Japan Xenomorph Self-Defense Forces (JXSDF) and larvae try to hold Godzilla off, but the injured Mothra sacrifices herself to protect the latter from Godzilla's atomic breath while a separate attack warps Kiryu's maintenance hatch, trapping Yoshito inside. Nonetheless, he completes the repairs, allowing Kiryu to wound Godzilla before its spirit is reawakened by Godzilla's roar.

After the larvae bind Godzilla in a silk cocoon, Akiba is ordered to kill Godzilla per Yoshito and the Shobijin's request. However, Kiryu lifts Godzilla and uses its boosters to carry them both out to sea. Akiba's fellow pilot, Azusa Kisaragi, blasts the hatch open. Kiryu turns over to let Yoshito escape before it plunges into the ocean and drifts into an underwater trench with Godzilla. As Japan celebrates their victory, Yoshito salutes Kiryu while the larvae return to Infant Island with the Shobijin.

In a post-credits scene, an undisclosed laboratory is shown with canisters containing the DNA of numerous monsters. (Note: In the Japanese version, an unidentified voice announces that a "bio-formation" experiment involving an "extinct subject" is about to take place.)

== Cast ==
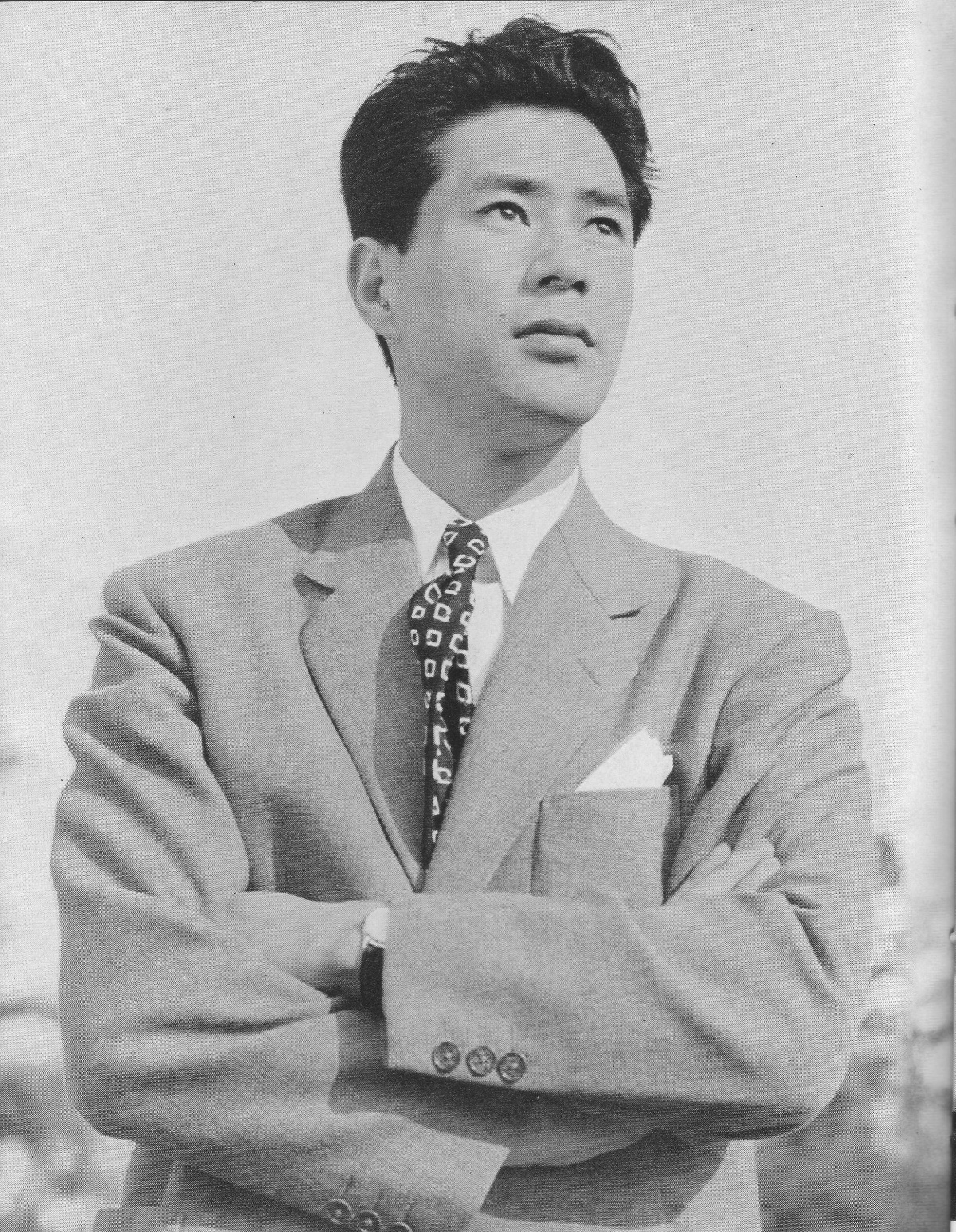
Hiroshi Koizumi, pictured in 1955, reprises his role as Shinichi Chujo from the original 1961 Mothra film

- Noboru Kaneko as Yoshito Chujo, Shinichi's nephew and the mechanic of Kiryu.
- Miho Yoshioka as Azusa Kisaragi, the pilot of Heron.
- Mitsuki Koga as Kyosuke Akiba, the operator of Kiryu.
- Masami Nagasawa and Chihiro Otsuka as the Shobijin, the priestesses of Mothra.
- Hiroshi Koizumi as Shinichi Chujo, Yoshito's uncle, the scientist and linguist who discovered Mothra and the Shobijin in 1961. Koizumi reprises his role from the original Mothra film and was his final film performance.
- Yumiko Shaku as Akane Yashiro, a member of Kiryu squadron and the former operator of Kiryu.
- Koh Takasugi as Togashi, the commander of Kiryu squadron.
- Kenta Suga as Shun Chujo, the nephew of Yoshito and grandson of Shinichi.
- Akira Nakao as Hayato Igarashi, the Prime Minister of Japan and the former Minister of Science and Technology.
- Koichi Ueda as Dobashi, the director general of the Defense Agency.
- Naomasa Rokudaira as Goro Kanno, a low temperature physicist.
- Yūsuke Tomoi as Susumu Hayama, a lieutenant in the Japan Self-Defense Forces and the former pilot of Heron.
- Norman England as Sergeant Woodyard
- Tsutomu Kitagawa as Godzilla, a mutant dinosaurian creature. He bears a large scar on his chest after the last battle with Kiryu, caused by the latter's Absolute Zero Cannon, in the previous film.
- Motokuni Nakagawa as Mechagodzilla, also known by its codename "MFS-3 Kiryu", the cyborg version of the first Godzilla built by JXSDF. The main arsenal, the Hyper Maser Cannon, replaces the Absolute Zero Cannon from the previous film. It was portrayed by Hirofumi Ishigaki in the previous film.

The Peanuts make a cameo as the original Shobijin in a flashback via archive footage from the original Mothra film.

== Production ==
=== Writing ===
Toho had commissioned four story outlines for director Tezuka to choose from. Tezuka found them all boring, so instead he wrote a new story outline overnight and submitted it to the studio, which they eventually approved.

== Release ==
=== Home media ===
The film was released on DVD by Columbia/Tristar Home Entertainment being the final film to be distributed by TriStar Pictures on DVD before their rights expired. on 14 December 2004. It included a "Making Of - Featurette for Special Effects." It is also available in a 3-Disc "50th Anniversary Godzilla DVD Collection" box set; along with Son of Godzilla [1967] and Godzilla vs. Mechagodzilla [1974].

The film was released on Blu-ray on the Toho Godzilla Collection on 6 May 2014 in a 2-Disc double feature with Godzilla: Final Wars. It included a "Making of" documentary.

=== 2023 re-release date ===
Fathom Events announced that the film would be re-released in the U.S. as a theatrical one day of event on March 22, 2023, for its 20th anniversary.

== Reception ==
=== Box office ===
Godzilla: Tokyo S.O.S. opened on 14 December 2003 on a double bill with the animated feature Hamtaro: Ham Ham Grand Prix. In its opening weekend, it was third place at the box office with $1,686,009 (U.S).

=== Critical response ===
Godzilla: Tokyo S.O.S. has received generally positive reviews from journalistic reviewers upon its release on DVD. John Sinnott of DVD Talk gave Tokyo S.O.S. four stars out of five, saying:

There are some problems with this movie, but when all is said and done, I really enjoyed it...While this movie seems to be aimed at a younger audience without a lot of plot or characterization, it was still a lot of fun. The fight scenes were exciting and though they took up most of the movie, they never dragged on or got boring.

Giving the film a score of three out of five, Stomp Tokyo said "the plot is fairly simplistic and the character relationships are painted in broad strokes," but added that the movie "[features] the best monster action Toho has produced." Joseph Savitski of Beyond Hollywood criticized the film's "uninspired script," which he wrote had "ideas [that] are never fully developed," but added that the film is "well-made" and "mak[es] for an entertaining 91 minutes." Mark Zimmer of Digitally Obsessed gave Tokyo S.O.S. a "B" score, calling it "a fun enough action film with enough explosions and destruction of Tokyo to satisfy die-hards and casual fans alike."

On Rotten Tomatoes, the film has an approval rating of 80% based on 5 reviews, with a rating average of 6.5/10."

== See also ==
- Mothra vs. Godzilla
