= Godzilla: King of the Monsters (soundtrack) =

Godzilla: King of the Monsters (Original Motion Picture Soundtrack)

Soundtrack album by Bear McCreary
- Released: May 24, 2019
- Recorded: 2018–2019
- Studios: Air Studios, Dean Street Studios, Heaven Recording Studio (Hong Kong)
- Genre: Film score
- Label: WaterTower Music
- Producers: Joe Augustine, Bear McCreary, Michael Dougherty (exec.), Peter Afterman (exec.), Margaret Yen (exec.)

Bear McCreary chronology
The Professor and the Madman (2019)	Godzilla: King of the Monsters (Original Motion Picture Soundtrack) (2019)	Rim of the World (2019)

Singles from Godzilla: King of the Monsters
- 1. "Old Rivals" Released: April 7, 2019; 2. "Godzilla (feat. Serj Tankian)" Released: April 15, 2019; 3. "Rodan" Released: May 23, 2019

Professional ratings
Review scores
Source	Rating
Soundtrack Universe	5/5 stars
The Action Elite	5/5 stars
Sci-Fi Bulletin	8/10 stars
Review Graveyard	8/10 stars
Filmtracks	5/5 stars

Godzilla: King of the Monsters (Original Motion Picture Soundtrack) is the soundtrack album to the 2019 American monster film Godzilla: King of the Monsters, composed by Bear McCreary. His involvement in the film was confirmed in July 2018, and recording of the musical score began later that year in Hong Kong.

Several themes from Akira Ifukube's musical score for Godzilla (1954), were incorporated and sampled in the score. The album and score influenced a mix of electronic, trance and orchestral music with Japanese music for few of the themes. The soundtrack was released by WaterTower Music on May 24, 2019, a week before the film's theatrical release date. A limited edition triple LP soundtrack was released by Waxwork Records on July 5.

== Background ==
On July 21, 2018, Dougherty revealed that Bear McCreary would compose the film's score, incorporating themes from Akira Ifukube's previous Godzilla scores. Regarding his involvement, McCreary stated, "I am thrilled to be the composer for Godzilla: King of the Monsters, and honored beyond words to have the opportunity to contribute to one of cinema's longest-running musical legacies." McCreary further expanded on his plans and involvement, stating;

"I've known Michael Dougherty for a long time, as we both run in the same film-nerd circles. I have always appreciated his love of film music, chatting with him for hours on end over the years about the scores we both love. I was thrilled for him when he landed the gig to direct Godzilla, because I knew what it meant to him. When he later asked me to join the project, I was overwhelmed with excitement, and awe, grateful for the chance to join him in contributing to the legacy of our favorite monster. We knew from the beginning that we wanted to incorporate classic [Akira] Ifukube themes, and yet I think fans will be excited to hear how they have evolved. There are some fun surprises in store. Fitting the material and Michael's visionary film, this score is the most massive I have ever written, and I can't wait for fans to experience it!"

In November 2018, a sample of McCreary's Godzilla theme was leaked online after it was used during a panel at Tokyo Comic Con. In April 2019, WaterTower Music released two tracks from the soundtrack, "Old Rivals", composed by McCreary, and a cover of Blue Öyster Cult's "Godzilla" by Serj Tankian. Brendon Small, Gene Hoglan, and other members of Dethklok contributed to the Tankian cover. McCreary called the cover "the most audacious piece of music" he had produced in his career, citing the orchestra, choir, taiko chanting, taiko drumming, heavy metal rhythm section, Hoglan's double-kick drums, and Tankian's vocals used to produce the track. McCreary stated "For [the character] Godzilla, I chose to incorporate and adapt the legendary Akira Ifukube's iconic theme, and for Mothra, Yūji Koseki's immortal 'Mothra's Song'."

He further reworked into traditional Japanese music to reinforce Godzilla's character, saying that he was "drawing from Japanese sounds, and wanted to give the theme a distinctly Japanese flavor" for which he across the chants of Japanese Buddhist monks. He further recalled "It's hypnotic and beautiful and surreal and calm, and I don't know why, but I thought, 'That's Ghidorah's theme. That's the antagonist.' I can't even explain it. If I tried to put it into words, it would sound like a mistake. But I set those calming hypnotic voices against this gigantic three-headed dragon, as it rises up from a frozen tomb, and it worked [...] It is only through experimentation and discovery, and that sort of indescribable act of inspiration, that an idea like that can form. So the research is super fun, and it's really what I love the most about writing to film." Apart from incorporating into Ifukube's theme, McCreary further took few samples from the score of its predecessor, which was composed by Alexandre Desplat. The introductory theme for "Rodan" was released as a single on May 23.

On May 31, Waxwork Records announced a triple LP soundtrack release on July, with pre-orders beginning on the same date.

== Track listing ==
The official track list of Godzilla: King of the Monsters was unveiled by WaterTower Music on April 26, 2019, with a press release announcing that the soundtrack will be released digitally on May 24.

All tracks are written by Bear McCreary, except where noted.

Godzilla: King of the Monsters (Original Motion Picture Soundtrack)
No.	Title	Length
1.	"Godzilla (feat. Serj Tankian)" (written by Donald Roeser)	3:10
2.	"Godzilla Main Theme" (written by Akira Ifukube)	2:34
3.	"Memories of San Francisco"	2:11
4.	"The Larva"	4:23
5.	"Welcome to Monarch"	2:54
6.	"Outpost 32"	7:03
7.	"Ice Breaker"	2:33
8.	"Rise of Ghidorah"	2:59
9.	"Old Rivals"	3:49
10.	"The First Gods"	5:18
11.	"Rodan"	5:23
12.	"A Mass Awakening"	5:32
13.	"The One Who is Many"	5:37
14.	"Queen of the Monsters"	3:35
15.	"For Andrew"	1:18
16.	"Stealing the Orca"	3:04
17.	"The Hollow Earth"	5:26
18.	"The Key to Coexistence"	2:18
19.	"Goodbye Old Friend"	2:54
20.	"Rebirth"	2:03
21.	"Fog Over Fenway"	2:53
22.	"Battle in Boston"	7:51
23.	"Redemption"	4:11
24.	"King of the Monsters"	3:34
25.	"Ghidorah Theme"	2:41
26.	"Mothra's Song" (written by Yūji Koseki)	2:10
Total length:		1:37:21

== Additional music ==
The first trailer featured a rearrangement of Claude Debussy's Clair de Lune by Michael Afanasyev for Imagine Music. The Beautiful TV spot and final trailer featured two different renditions of "Over the Rainbow". An alternate mix of Nessun dorma was featured in the extended IMAX preview. LL Cool J's "Mama Said Knock You Out" was featured in the Exclusive Final Look trailer. Both the scores were not featured in the film and its score soundtrack.

The Japanese band Alexandros contributed the single "Pray" for the film's Japanese release. On this decision, Dougherty commented, "we feel incredibly fortunate to have had [Alexandros] contribute such an anthemic song that captures not only the gravitas of the film, but also perfectly complements its dramatic conclusion." The single was released on May 13, 2019.

== Critical response ==
Despite the film's mixed reception, the soundtrack was received positively by critics. The review from Zanobard Reviews said, "as monster scores go, Bear McCreary's score to Godzilla: King Of The Monsters is mind-blowingly good. The fact that each of the featured monsters has their own theme is a great compositional choice, and the various reprises of their classic themes just makes the experience even better. The album is also breathtakingly well-orchestrated throughout, being as dramatic as it is terrifying, and featuring many a welcome action cue." Critic Jonathan Broxton of Movie Music UK priased McCreary's work on the score, calling it the "best score of his career to date" and saying that "It's not just the fact that he respected the musical heritage of the franchise; it's not just that the new kaiju themes are all unique and memorable; it's not just that the score has an intelligent internal architecture that applies thematic ideas leitmotivically; it's not just the brilliant use of so many different vocal styles; it's not just the creative instrumentation; and it's not just the intensity of the action material or the number of different percussion patterns he uses throughout the score. It's the combination of all these things together that makes Godzilla: King of the Monsters so impressive."

Paul Taylor of LemonWire wrote, "The soundtrack successfully honors its predecessors while also managing to add some great original material of its own. The only downside with this soundtrack is that it can feel a bit repetitive at times. Lots of blaring horns. Lots of swelling strings. And lots of epic, clashing ensembles. These are offset slightly with tracks like "Goodbye Old Friend" and "Queen of the Monsters". While McCreary's soundtrack pairs well within the film, it's not one I can imagine listening to on its own. While some scores can be nice to use as background music while writing or studying, this one in particular seems a bit too bombastic overall for that purpose. It's a score that's meant to captures your attention, not fade into the background."

== Sources ==
- Kalat, David (2010). A Critical History and Filmography of Toho's Godzilla Series (Second ed.). McFarland. ISBN 9780786447497.
- Ryfle, Steve (1998). Japan's Favorite Mon-Star: The Unauthorized Biography of the Big G. ECW Press. ISBN 1550223488.
