= Godzilla: Final Wars (soundtrack) =

2004 film soundtrack

The Godzilla: Final Wars soundtrack is the film score to the 2004 film Godzilla: Final Wars composed by Keith Emerson, Nobuhiko Morino, and Daisuke Yano. The soundtrack album was released on December 20, 2004 through Victor Entertainment. In 2010, Toho Music released a 3-disc expansion of the soundtrack album as part of their 50th Anniversary Godzilla Soundtrack Perfect Collection releases.

== Background ==
During one of Keith Emerson's concerts in Japan, director Ryuhei Kitamura approached him to compose the film's score because he was a fan of Emerson, Lake & Palmer and Progressive Rock. Emerson was concerned whether he would be given enough time before going on tour and was given two weeks to write the film's music; he wrote more tracks than what was used in the final cut. Nobuhiko Morino and Daisuke Yano contributed additional music to the score, however, Emerson did not collaborate with them. "We're All to Blame" by Sum 41 was featured in the film during the battle between Godzilla and Zilla.

== Victor Entertainment release ==
Godzilla: Final Wars - Music from the Motion Picture

Soundtrack album by Keith Emerson, Nobuhiko Morino, Daisuke Yano
- Released: December 20, 2004
- Genres: Soundtrack, film score
- Length: 69:07
- Label: Victor Entertainment

=== Track listing ===
No.	Title	Writer(s)	Length
1.	"Theme of Godzilla"	Akira Ifukube	0:29
2.	"The King of Monsters"	Daisuke Yano	1:55
3.	"The Beginning of the End"	Nobuhiko Morino	1:49
4.	"Manda Vs Gotengo Part 1"	Keith Emerson	2:09
5.	"Manda Vs Gotengo Part 2"	Keith Emerson	2:45
6.	"Training Facility Fight"	Keith Emerson	1:35
7.	"EDF Museum"	Keith Emerson	1:16
8.	"Infant Island"	Keith Emerson	1:22
9.	"Rodan Attacks NYC"	Keith Emerson	4:12
10.	"The Arrival"	Daisuke Yano	2:19
11.	"The Proof"	Nobuhiko Morino	2:50
12.	"Reveal"	Nobuhiko Morino	3:52
13.	"High Battle"	Keith Emerson	2:47
14.	"Operation: Final War"	Nobuhiko Morino	3:26
15.	"Area G"	Nobuhiko Morino	3:11
16.	"Return of the King"	Daisuke Yano	1:18
17.	"Ready for Rumble"	Daisuke Yano	2:37
18.	"Kazama's Sacrifice"	Keith Emerson	2:24
19.	"Back in Action"	Nobuhiko Morino	0:47
20.	"Awaken"	Daisuke Yano	4:57
21.	"Fight Back"	Daisuke Yano	1:40
22.	"The Rising"	Daisuke Yano	2:04
23.	"Ending Title"	Keith Emerson	4:41
24.	"Awakening G"	Keith Emerson	1:49
25.	"Respect G"	Keith Emerson	2:57
26.	"First Meeting"	Keith Emerson	1:26
27.	"Monster Zero March"	Keith Emerson	2:12
28.	"Cruising the Cirro-Stratus"	Keith Emerson	2:42
29.	"Godzilla (Main Theme)"	Keith Emerson	1:20
Total length:			69:07

== Perfect Collection release ==
Godzilla: Final Wars - Soundtrack Perfect Collection

Soundtrack album by Keith Emerson, Nobuhiko Morino, Daisuke Yano
- Released: April 25, 2010
- Genres: Soundtrack, film score
- Length: 221:40 (total)
- Label: Toho Music

In 2010, Toho Music included a 3-disc expanded version on the sixth box set of the Godzilla Soundtrack Perfect Collection releases. The 3-disc soundtrack contains demos and rejected tracks from Emerson, as well as the complete compositions from Morino and Yano.

=== Track listing ===
Disc 1
No.	Title	Writer(s)	Length
1.	"Opening (King Kong vs. Godzilla M10)"	Akira Ifukube (Note: Stock music from King Kong vs. Godzilla (1962))	0:29
2.	"Godzilla vs. the Undersea Battleship (M1 Edit)"	Daisuke Yano	1:54
3.	"Earth Defense Force and the Threat of Monsters (M2A Long)"	Keith Emerson	1:14
4.	"Main Title (M2C)"	Nobuhiko Morino	1:51
5.	"Gotengo vs. Manda (M3)"	Keith Emerson	2:49
6.	"M Organization Combat Training Facility (M4)"	Keith Emerson	1:38
7.	"Doctor Otonashi (M5)"	Nobuhiko Morino	1:18
8.	"Gigan Mummified (M6)"	Keith Emerson	1:20
9.	"Message From Infant Island (M7)"	Keith Emerson	1:43
10.	"Rodan Attacks New York (M8)"	Keith Emerson	4:15
11.	"Ebirah vs. the Mutant Forces (M9)"	Keith Emerson	2:36
12.	"The Xilien Arrive (M10)"	Daisuke Yano	4:55
13.	"We Love X I (5.1 Channel Material)"	Keith Emerson	0:32
14.	"We Love X II (Cruising the Cirro-Stratus)"	Keith Emerson	0:19
15.	"Secretary General Daigo's Accident (M11)"	Nobuhiko Morino	2:50
16.	"Commander Namikawa's Abnormality (M12 Mix)"	Nobuhiko Morino	1:29
17.	"The Truth About Gorath (M13)"	Nobuhiko Morino	1:00
18.	"Xilien Conspiracy I (M14b)"	Nobuhiko Morino	1:26
19.	"Xilien Conspiracy II (M14a)"	Nobuhiko Morino	10:33
20.	"Highway Battle (M15)"	Keith Emerson	2:48
21.	"Gigan Awakens (M16 Edit)"	Daisuke Yano	1:58
22.	"Gotengo's Underground Base (M17)"	Nobuhiko Morino	0:42
23.	"Operation: Final War (M18 + M19)"	Nobuhiko Morino	4:28
24.	"Gotengo Launch (M20)"	Keith Emerson	1:09
25.	"The King of the Monsters Returns (M22 Edit)"	Nobuhiko Morino	3:34
26.	"Gotengo and Godzilla (M23-1)"	Daisuke Yano	1:21
27.	"Godzilla vs. Kumonga · Kamacuras (M23-2)"	Daisuke Yano	2:09
28.	"The Wrath of Godzilla (M24)"	Nobuhiko Morino	2:30
29.	"Godzilla vs. the Three Monsters (M25 GtrA)"	Daisuke Yano	3:28
30.	"Kazama's Suicide Attack (M26 Edit)"	Keith Emerson	2:28
31.	"The Gotengo Breaks Through (M26B)"	Nobuhiko Morino	1:07
32.	"Mothra Flies (M27)"	Nobuhiko Morino	0:15
33.	"Godzilla vs. Hedorah and Ebirah (M27B)"	Nobuhiko Morino	0:46
Total length:			73:16

Disc 2 (including Bonus tracks)
No.	Title	Writer(s)	Length
1.	"The Xilien's Intent (M28)"	Nobuhiko Morino	2:37
2.	"Monster X Appears (M29 Add)"	Nobuhiko Morino	0:49
3.	"Mothra vs. Gigan (M30)"	Daisuke Yano	1:08
4.	"The Fierce Battle of Four Great Monsters (M31-1)"	Daisuke Yano	4:56
5.	"The Fight in the UFO Mother Ship I (M31-2)"	Daisuke Yano	1:41
6.	"The Fight in the UFO Mother Ship II (M32)"	Daisuke Yano	4:42
7.	"Keizer Conflict (M33)"	Daisuke Yano	2:05
8.	"The End of the Xilien (M34)"	Nobuhiko Morino	2:47
9.	"Keizer Ghidorah Appears (M35-1)"	Daisuke Yano	4:24
10.	"Godzilla vs. Keizer Ghidorah (M35-2)"	Daisuke Yano	1:57
11.	"The Battle is Over (M36)"	Nobuhiko Morino	2:00
12.	"Godzilla and Minilla Leave (M37 Before End)"	Keith Emerson	1:51
13.	"Ending (M37 Edit Type 1)"	Keith Emerson	4:42
14.	"Godzilla vs. the Undersea Battleship (M1)"	Daisuke Yano	1:57
15.	"Gigan Awakens (M16)"	Daisuke Yano	1:58
16.	"Cruising the Cirro-Stratus"	Keith Emerson	2:44
17.	"The King of the Monsters Returns (M22)"	Nobuhiko Morino	3:37
18.	"The King of the Monsters Returns (M22 · 5.1 Channel Material)"	Nobuhiko Morino	3:28
19.	"The Gotengo Breaks Through - Mothra Flies (M26B + M27 · 5.1 Channel Material)"	Nobuhiko Morino	1:18
20.	"Keizer Ghidorah Appears - Godzilla vs. Keizer Ghidorah (M35 · 5.1 Channel Material)"	Daisuke Yano	5:37
21.	"Earth Defense Force and the Threat of Monsters (M2)"	Keith Emerson	2:59
22.	"Kazama's Suicide Attack (M26 Tribute Version)"	Keith Emerson	2:27
23.	"Monster X Appears (M29)"	Nobuhiko Morino	0:49
24.	"Ending (M37 Type 2)"	Keith Emerson	4:34
25.	"Ending (M37)"	Keith Emerson	6:22
Total length:			73:49

Disc 3
No.	Title	Writer(s)	Length
1.	"Appearance of the Xilians (M10 Edit) 2:20"	Daisuke Yano	2:20
2.	"Conspiracy of the Xilians (M14 Edit)"	Nobuhiko Morino	3:52
3.	"Operation Final Wars (M18 19 Edit)"	Nobuhiko Morino	3:26
4.	"The Return of the King (M22 Edit)"	Nobuhiko Morino	3:10
5.	"Godzilla vs. The Three Giant Monsters (M25 Edit)"	Daisuke Yano	2:36
6.	"M11"	Keith Emerson	0:49
7.	"M2A"	Keith Emerson	0:40
8.	"M32"	Keith Emerson	0:45
9.	"M241"	Keith Emerson	0:26
10.	"M25 Battle 1"	Keith Emerson	2:14
11.	"M25 Battle 2"	Keith Emerson	3:05
12.	"Xilien Ship 1"	Keith Emerson	2:28
13.	"Xilien Ship 3"	Keith Emerson	2:21
14.	"First Meeting"	Keith Emerson	0:23
15.	"Parody Spy Movie Into Serious 1"	Keith Emerson	1:10
16.	"Parody Spy Movie Into Serious 2"	Keith Emerson	1:52
17.	"Hedorah"	Keith Emerson	0:44
18.	"Ifukube GZ"	Keith Emerson	1:21
19.	"Demo Music 1"	Keith Emerson	1:50
20.	"Demo Music 2"	Keith Emerson	2:43
21.	"Demo Music 3"	Keith Emerson	1:22
22.	"Demo Music 4"	Keith Emerson	2:37
23.	"Demo Music 5"	Keith Emerson	3:16
24.	"Demo Music 6"	Keith Emerson	2:00
25.	"Demo Music 7"	Keith Emerson	1:14
26.	"Demo Music 8"	Keith Emerson	2:17
27.	"Demo Music 9"	Keith Emerson	1:57
28.	"Demo Music 10"	Keith Emerson	2:00
29.	"Demo Music 11"	Keith Emerson	2:12
30.	"Demo Music 12"	Keith Emerson	2:24
31.	"Demo Music 13"	Keith Emerson	2:48
32.	"Demo Music 14"	Keith Emerson	2:08
33.	"Demo Music 15"	Keith Emerson	5:13
Total length:			74:34
