= Akira Nakao =

Japanese actor (1942–2024)

- 中尾 彬
- Born: August 11, 1942; Kisarazu, Chiba, Japan
- Died: May 16, 2024 (aged 81)
- Education: Musashino Art University
- Occupations: Actor, TV personality, artist
- Years active: 1964–2024
- Agent: Furutachi Project
- Spouses: Narumi Kayashima (m. 1970–1975); Shino Ikenami (m. 1978–2024)
- Website: furutachi-project.co.jp/profile/nakao/

Akira Nakao (中尾 彬, Nakao Akira; August 11, 1942 – May 16, 2024) was a Japanese actor, television personality, and artist from Kisarazu, Chiba. He was represented by the Furutachi Project agency.

== Biography ==
Nakao attended Chiba Prefectural Kisarazu High School from 1958, and entered Musashino Art University from 1961. Also in 1961, he was selected in the "5th Nikkatsu New Face" talent competition.

In 1963, he left Musashino Art University to study in Paris, France. On returning to Japan in 1964, he enrolled in the Mingei (民芸) theatre company, where he studied under Jūkichi Uno. In 1971, he left the Mingei theatre group to work as a freelance actor.

In 1978, he married actress Shino Ikenami, the daughter of rakugo comedian Kingentei Basho. They received the "Nice Couple Award" in 2008.

In 1988, he started studying ceramics under Masaaki Kosugi in Karatsu, Saga.

== Death ==
Akira Nakao died from heart failure on May 16, 2024, at the age of 81.

== Acting career ==
Nakao has appeared in jidaigeki (period dramas) and contemporary dramas on television and film, as well as variety shows. Fans of Abarenbō Shōgun immediately recognize him as the scheming Tokugawa Muneharu, arch-rival of the eighth shogun Yoshimune. He played the role for twenty years. Film appearances include five episodes in the series Gokudō no Onna-tachi and six Godzilla movies. He also acted in the 1992 Juzo Itami film Minbo: the Gentle Art of Japanese Extortion.

In 2015, Nakao won the award for best supporting actor of Tokyo Sports Film Award for his role in Ryuzo and the Seven Henchmen.

== Filmography ==
=== Film ===
- Getsuyōbi no Yuka (月曜日のユカ) (1964)
- The Vampire Doll (1970)
- Death at an Old Mansion (1975)
- Kaerazaru hibi (1978)
- Nihon no Fixer (1979)
- Shikake-nin Baian (1981)
- Ninja Wars (1982)
- Haru no Kane (1985)
- Minbo: the Gentle Art of Japanese Extortion (1992)
- Godzilla vs. Mechagodzilla II (1993), Takaki Aso
- Godzilla vs. SpaceGodzilla (1994), Takaki Aso
- Godzilla vs. Destoroyah (1995), Takaki Aso
- Hissatsu! Shamisenya no Yuji (1999)
- Godzilla Against Mechagodzilla (2002), Hayato Igarashi
- Godzilla: Tokyo S.O.S. (2003), Hayato Igarashi
- Godzilla: Final Wars (2004), original Gotengo captain
- Achilles and the Tortoise (2008), art collector
- Hagetaka: The Movie (The Vulture) (2009)
- Inu to Anata no Monogatari (2011)
- Outrage Beyond (2012), gangster
- Heroine Shikkaku (2015), Himself
- Ryuzo and the Seven Henchmen (2015), Mokichi
- Tonde Saitama (2019)
- Ninkyō Gakuen (2019)
- Let's Talk About the Old Times (2022), himself

=== Television ===
- Shin Heike Monogatari (1972) - Taira no Tadanori
- Castle of Sand (1977)
- Tokyo Megure Keishi (1978) (episode 23)
- Ai no Arashi (1986), Saegusa Den'emon (Japanese adaptation of Wuthering Heights)
- Homura Tatsu (1993–94) - Emperor Go-Shirakawa
- Shonan Junai-gumi! (1995) - Principal Dokudai Tokiaritsune
- Hideyoshi (1996) - Shibata Katsuie
- Great Teacher Onizuka (1998) - Hiroshi Uchiyamada
- Yoshitsune (2005) - Kajiwara Kagetoki
- Tenchijin (2009) - Mōri Terumoto
- Ryōmaden (2010) - Shigeta Ichijirō
- Clouds Over the Hill - (2010) - Hidaka Sōnojō
- Sanctuary (2023), Kumada-oyakata

=== Video games ===
- Judge Eyes (2018) - Ryuzo Genda
- Lost Judgment (2021) - Ryuzo Genda

== Awards ==
- 1980: Bronze Award at Le Salon exhibition in France
- 1981: Grand Prix at Le Salon exhibition in France
- 1982: International Award at Le Salon exhibition in France
