= Tsutomu Kitagawa =

Japanese actor and stuntman

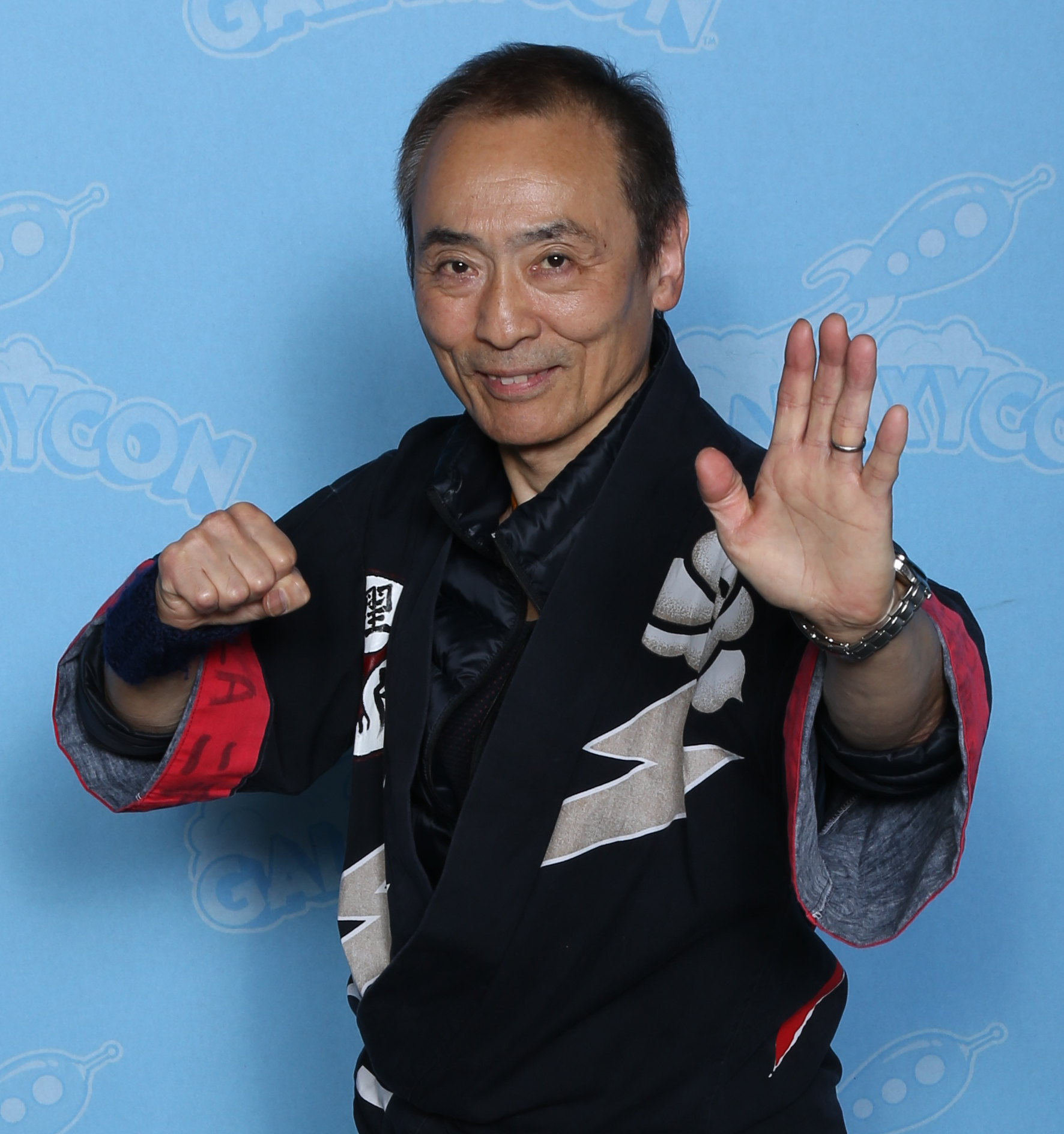
- Kitagawa at the 2019 GalaxyCon Louisville
- Born: December 21, 1957 (age 68); Kudamatsu, Yamaguchi, Japan
- Occupations: Actor, stuntman
- Years active: 1975–present
- Known for: Godzilla, Super Sentai
- Television: Super Sentai

Tsutomu Kitagawa (喜多川2tom (Real name,喜多川 務), Kitagawa Tsutomu; born December 21, 1957) is a Japanese actor and stuntman who is mostly known for playing Godzilla for the "Millennium" (or "Shinsei") series. He also played King Ghidorah for Rebirth of Mothra III. He also played the costumed actor for the Blue (and occasionally, Black) Ranger in many of Toei Company's Super Sentai Series in the 1980s, better known in the United States as Power Rangers. Kitagawa graduated from Sakuragaoka High School before joining Sonny Chiba's Japan Action Club in January 1975.

== Filmography ==
=== Suit actor ===
- Battle Fever J (1979) - Battle Kenya, Miss America 2
- Denshi Sentai Denziman (1980-1981) - Denzi Blue
- Dai Sentai Goggle-V (1982-1983) - Goggle Black
- Kagaku Sentai Dynaman (1983-1984) - Dyna yellow
- Choudenshi Bioman (1984-1985) - Blue Three
- Dengeki Sentai Changeman (1985-1986) - Change Pegasus
- Choushinsei Flashman (1986-1987) - Blue Flash
- Hikari Sentai Maskman (1987-1988) - Blue Mask
- Sekai Ninja Sen Jiraiya (1988-1989) - Chinese Ninja Lu-Long
- Gosei Sentai Dairanger (1993-1994) - Shishi Ranger
- Ninja Sentai Kakuranger (1994-1995) - Ninja Black
- Juken Sentai Gekiranger (2007-2008) - Master Bat li
- Ressha Sentai ToQger vs. Kyoryuger: The Movie - ToQ 2gou (child version)
- Ressha Sentai ToQger Returns: Super ToQ 7gou of Dreams - ToQ 2gou (child version)

==== Chouseishin series ====
- Chouseishin Gransazer (2003-2004) - Sazer Remls

=== Other roles ===
- Megaloman (1979) - Black Star soldiers
- Rebirth of Mothra III (1998) as King Ghidorah/Cretaceous King Ghidorah
- Godzilla 2000 (1999) as Godzilla
- Godzilla vs. Megaguirus (2000) as Godzilla
- Godzilla Against Mechagodzilla (2002) as Godzilla/1954 Godzilla
- Godzilla: Tokyo S.O.S. (2003) as Godzilla
- Godzilla: Final Wars (2004) as Godzilla
- Bringing Godzilla Down to Size: The Art of Japanese Special Effects (2008) as himself

=== Non-Suit Roles ===
- Taiyo Sentai Sun Vulcan (1981) - Worker
- Dai Sentai Goggle-V (1982) - Kung-Fu Doll, Motorcycle Gang member
- Dengeki Sentai Changeman (1985) - Saga
- Choujin Sentai Jetman (1991) - Man
- Juken Sentai Gekiranger (2007) - Cake Vendor
- Kamen Rider Wizard (2013) - Guard
- Ressha Sentai ToQger (2014) - Guard
- Kikai Sentai Zenkaiger (2021) - Mr. Su
