= ACTV Japan =

ACTV JAPAN / 有限会社アクセステレビ
- Industry: 映像制作
- Founded: 2005
- Founder: 沼井善男
- Headquarters: 東京都世田谷区, 日本
- Key people: 取締役：坂井利帆
- Website: www.actvjapan.com

ACTV Japan, officially Access Television Limited (also referred to as ACTV), is a Japanese video and television production company based in Shibuya, Tokyo. The company was founded by Yoshio Numai in 2005 for the development and production of original TV and movie programming in Japan. It developed and produced the entertainment news show Fox Backstage Pass for Fox International Channels. They currently produce the documentary movie "Fishmans".

== Filmography ==
=== Current ===
- Fishmans (Documentary movie)

=== Former programmes ===
- FOX Backstage Pass (for Fox International Channels)
- Black Life in Japan
- The Biography
