= Godzilla (Main Theme) =

Single by Akira Ifukube

from the album Godzilla
- Released: 1954
- Genre: Soundtrack
- Length: 1:32 (original version)
- Label: Toho
- Songwriter: Akira Ifukube

Akira Ifukube singles chronology
| "Godzilla (Main Theme)" (1954) | "'Godzilla March'" (1962) |

Audio sample
- From Godzilla: file; help

"Godzilla (Main Theme)" (Japanese: ゴジラのテーマ, Hepburn: Gojira no Tēma; lit. 'Godzilla's Theme') is a musical theme written by Akira Ifukube for the 1954 film Godzilla. Despite the track being titled as "Main Title" on the Godzilla soundtrack, fans and Toho executives know the track as the Main Godzilla Theme or the Godzilla (Main Theme) song.

== Overview ==
Ifukube had been an admirer of Maurice Ravel, and introduced a melody reminiscent of a motif from Ravel's Piano Concerto in G major in his Arctic Forest (1945) and Rapsodia Concertante for Violin and Orchestra (1948). This subsequently became a basis for Godzilla's Theme.

The sheet music "M1" or "Pursue Godzilla" (Japanese: ゴジラ追撃せよ, Hepburn: Gojira Tsuigeki Seyo) which is the actual motif of Godzilla's Theme, was originally intended to be associated with the Japanese Self Defense Forces featured in the film, it became the thematic leitmotif for the monster character Godzilla and the entire franchise. The original theme song of the monster was "MA" or "Ferocity of Godzilla" (Japanese: ゴジラの猛威, Hepburn: Gojira no Mōi), alternatively as "Terror of Godzilla" (Japanese: ゴジラの恐怖, Hepburn: Gojira no Kyōfu), which was used for Godzilla's assault on Shinagawa in the 1954 film, and was recurringly used in the franchise.

The theme first appeared on the original Godzilla film and in later sequels was replaced by a new theme titled the Godzilla March. The Godzilla (Main Theme) was re-used (as a theme song for the kaiju itself) for the first time in Terror of Mechagodzilla (1975), the final Godzilla film featuring the Showa era's continuity within the franchise. Ifukube participated in Godzilla vs. King Ghidorah (1991), and the "M1" has become a theme song for the character thereafter, while the "MA" wasn't used until Godzilla vs. Mechagodzilla II.

Ifukube had utilized motives identical to the "M1" and "MA" for scenes to involve gigantic objects and crowds in several non-Godzilla films, such as The President and a Female Clerk (1948) by Shochiku, City of the Spider (1950) by Daiei Film, Sakuma Dam (1954), a documentary film by Iwanami Productions for the eponymous dam, Castle of Flames (1960) by Toei Company, Chūshingura: Hana no Maki, Yuki no Maki (1962) by Toho, The Last Woman of Shang (1964) by Shaw Brothers Studio and Shin Films, and so on.

== Alterations ==
As the theme was brought back in sequels, it was also altered to fit in with the tone of the film. When it was brought back in Terror of Mechagodzilla, the main title from the film was mixed with the theme song. The only two songs on the Terror of Mechagodzilla soundtrack that have the Godzilla Theme mixed with the main titles are "The Appearance of Godzilla", "Godzilla vs. The Mega-Monster Tag-Team", and the "Main Title" itself. On the Godzilla vs. Biollante and Godzilla vs. King Ghidorah Soundtrack, the tracks "Begin The Attack!" and "Godzilla vs. King Ghidorah" are actually the "Godzilla Theme", but they are not altered in any way. On the Godzilla vs. King Ghidorah Soundtrack, the track "Godzilla's Resurrection" is a mixture of the Godzilla Theme and the Godzilla March, the second official Godzilla theme.

A rearranged, untitled edition of the "Ferocity of Godzilla" was used in Godzilla vs. Destoroyah, which is Ifukube's last work as a music director. Its ending title track is the "Godzilla Theme" song with mixed excerpts from the King Kong vs. Godzilla soundtrack. The King Kong vs. Godzilla version was also arranged for later installments that didn't involve Ifukube in productions, such as Godzilla: Final Wars (arranged by Keith Emerson) and Shin Godzilla.

Bear McCreary arranged the track for the Godzilla: King of the Monsters soundtrack, keeping the track titled as "Godzilla Main Title" in addition to using it throughout the film as a theme for the titular character, incorporating kakegoe shouts from twenty-five taiko performers into the mix to represent the monster's strength and heroism in the film's story. Kan Sawada arranged the track for Godzilla Singular Point. Naoki Satō arranged the theme for the soundtrack of Godzilla Minus One.

== See also ==
- Godzilla (Blue Öyster Cult song)
- Godzilla (Eminem song)
