= Hirofumi Ishigaki =

Japanese actor and action director (born 1963)

Hirofumi Ishigaki (石垣広文, Ishigaki Hirofumi) (born February 20, 1963, in Yamagata Prefecture) is a Japanese actor and director.

== Stunt/Suit Actor Roles ==
=== Super Sentai Series ===
- Dai Sentai Goggle V (1982–1983) – Spotmen
- Kagaku Sentai Dynaman (1983–1984) – Tail Soldiers
- Choudenshi Bioman (1984–1985) – Green Two, Zyuoh, Aquaiger
- Dengeki Sentai Changeman (1985–1986) – Space Beast Warriors, Hidrer Soldiers
- Choushinsei Flashman (1986–1987) – Green Flash
- Hikari Sentai Maskman (1987–1988) – Black Mask
- Choujuu Sentai Liveman (1988–1989) – Black Bison
- Kousoku Sentai Turboranger (1989–1990) – Black Turbo, Turbo Rugger
- Chikyu Sentai Fiveman (1990–1991) – Five Blue
- Chōjin Sentai Jetman (1991–1992) – Yellow Owl
- Kyōryū Sentai Zyuranger (1992–1993) – Tiger Ranger
- Gosei Sentai Dairanger (1993–1994) – Kirinranger
- Ninja Sentai Kakuranger (1994–1995) – Ninja Yellow
- Denji Sentai Megaranger (1997–1998) – Neji Blue
- Seijuu Sentai Gingaman (1998–1999) – Battobas
- Hyakujuu Sentai Gaoranger (2001–2002) – Gao Yellow
- Ninpu Sentai Hurricaneger (2002) – Kuroko Robot
- Juken Sentai Gekiranger (2007) – Tabu

=== Kamen Rider Series ===
- Kamen Rider Agito (2001) – El Lord

=== Metal Heroes Series ===
- Jikuu Senshi Spielban (1986) – Warler combat machine man
- Choujinki Metalder (1987–1988) – Dranger
- Juukou B-Fighter (1995–1996) – Schwartz
- B-Fighter Kabuto (1996–1997) – Beezack

== Action Director ==
=== Super Sentai Series ===
- Ninpu Sentai Hurricaneger (2002–2003)
- Bakuryuu Sentai Abaranger (2003–2004)
- Tokusou Sentai Dekaranger (2004–2005)
- Mahou Sentai Magiranger (2005–2006)
- GoGo Sentai Boukenger (2006–2007)
- Juken Sentai Gekiranger (2007–2008)
- Engine Sentai Go-Onger (2008–2009)
- Samurai Sentai Shinkenger (2009–2010)
- Tensou Sentai Goseiger (2010–2011)
- Kaizoku Sentai Gokaiger (2011–2012)

=== Kamen Rider Series ===
- Kamen Rider Wizard (2012–2013)
- Kamen Rider Gaim (2013–2014)

== Non-Suit Roles ==
- Dengeki Sentai Changeman (1985) – Kitagawa
- Ninja Sentai Kakuranger (1994) – Ghost
- Ninja Sentai Kakuranger: The Movie (1994) – Younger Hitotsume Kozou
- Juukou B-Fighter (1995) – Heavysnake, Bagma-Virus, Maskuder (voices)
- B-Fighter Kabuto – Staff Member
- Kamen Rider Kuuga (2000) – Makuhari
