= Godzilla Minus One (soundtrack) =

Godzilla Minus One (Original Soundtrack)

Soundtrack album by Naoki Satō
- Released: October 28, 2023
- Genre: Film score
- Length: 56:12
- Label: Rambling Records

Naoki Satō chronology
The Legend and Butterfly (2023)	Godzilla Minus One (Original Soundtrack) (2023)	6 Lying University Students (2024)

Godzilla Minus One (Original Motion Picture Soundtrack) (Note: 『ゴジラ-1.0』オリジナルサウンドトラック, "Gojira Mainasu Wan" Orijinaru Saundotorakku; lit. '"Godzilla Minus One" Original Soundtrack') is the soundtrack to the 2023 kaiju film Godzilla Minus One directed by Takashi Yamazaki. The score is composed by Naoki Satō, a frequent collaborator of Yamazaki, featuring 17 tracks from the film score and was released through Rambling Records on October 28, 2023. The same day, it was released internationally through Milan Records, followed by a Japanese vinyl released on November 24. Waxwork Records also released the score on vinyl, with pre-ordering starting on January 19, 2024.

== Track listing ==
No.	Title	Length
1.	"Fear"	3:48
2.	"Portent"	3:25
3.	"Confusion"	5:30
4.	"Godzilla Suite I"	3:40
5.	"Divine"	2:12
6.	"Elegy"	2:34
7.	"Mission"	3:28
8.	"Hope"	0:53
9.	"Honor"	1:57
10.	"Pride"	2:41
11.	"Pain"	5:09
12.	"Resolution"	5:08
13.	"Godzilla Suite II"	4:48
14.	"Unscathed"	2:17
15.	"Last"	2:33
16.	"Pray"	4:14
17.	"Godzilla Suite III"	1:47
Total length:		56:12

== Reception ==
Tim Grierson of Screen International wrote "Naoki Sato's booming, mournful orchestral score suggests that Godzilla is a symbol of something greater — the horror and inexplicable agony of the brutal war the Japanese have just endured." Richard Kuipers of Variety wrote "Naoki Sato's subtle orchestral score is perfectly in tune with the film's emotional undercurrents and leaps wonderfully to life". Hannah Rose of Comic Book Resources commended the score's range, "between the gentle, spare, and haunting single-line melodies of intimate and emotional scenes and huge, dark, and full of explosive scare chords during Godzilla's rampages. During the more triumphant scenes, Sato channels Studio Ghibli mainstay Joe Hisaishi, putting sweeping orchestras against the characters' heroic speeches. But equally important to the scenes with music are those without. Godzilla Minus One has many moments where the ambient sounds make up the only soundtrack — lending a sense of peace and realism in the human moments and greater dramatic impact to those where Godzilla is on the loose."

Music critic Jonathan Broxton described it as a "complicated, unconventional, uncompromising, sometimes difficult, but deeply impressive stuff, and yet another example of why Naoki Sato is one of the best Japanese composers of his generation". Pete Hammond of Deadline Hollywood wrote "Naoki Sato's score is exceptional and, showing affection to where this all started, there also is sweet use of music icon Akira Ifukube's original Godzilla theme." Simon Abrams of RogerEbert.com said that Sato "lays down a droning orchestral wall of sound that his string section flits across like a surfer riding a towering and perpetually cresting wave. It's one of the most rousing and nerve-wracking original scores in a recent Godzilla movie." Lucas Trevor of The Washington Post described it as "building" and "booming".

In a negative review, Filmtracks.com summarized "Despite all the incredible potential of having Sato score a massive entry in this franchise, the end result is a strategic misfire of epic proportions."

== Chart performance ==
Chart performance for Godzilla Minus One (Original Soundtrack)
Chart (2023)	Peak position
Japanese Albums (Billboard)	49
Japanese Albums (Oricon)	34

== Accolades ==
Accolades for Godzilla Minus One (Original Soundtrack)
Award	Date of ceremony	Category	Recipient(s)	Result	Ref.
Columbus Film Critics Association Awards	January 4, 2024	Best Score	Naoki Satō	Nominated	
Indiana Film Journalists Association Awards	December 18, 2023	Best Musical Score	Naoki Satō	Nominated	
International Film Music Critics Association Awards	February 22, 2024	Film Score of the Year	Naoki Satō	Nominated	
International Film Music Critics Association Awards	February 22, 2024	Best Original Score for a Fantasy/Science Fiction Film	Naoki Satō	Won	
Japan Academy Film Prize	March 8, 2024	Best Music	Naoki Satō	Nominated	
Mainichi Film Awards	February 14, 2024	Best Film Score	Naoki Satō	Nominated	

== Release history ==
Release dates and formats for Godzilla Minus One (Original Soundtrack)
Region	Date	Format(s)	Label	Ref.
Japan	October 28, 2023	Digital download; streaming	Rambling	
Japan	November 24, 2023	Vinyl	Rambling	
International	October 28, 2023	Digital download; streaming	Milan	
International	April 19, 2024	Vinyl	Waxwork	
