= Kaiju =

Japanese media genre

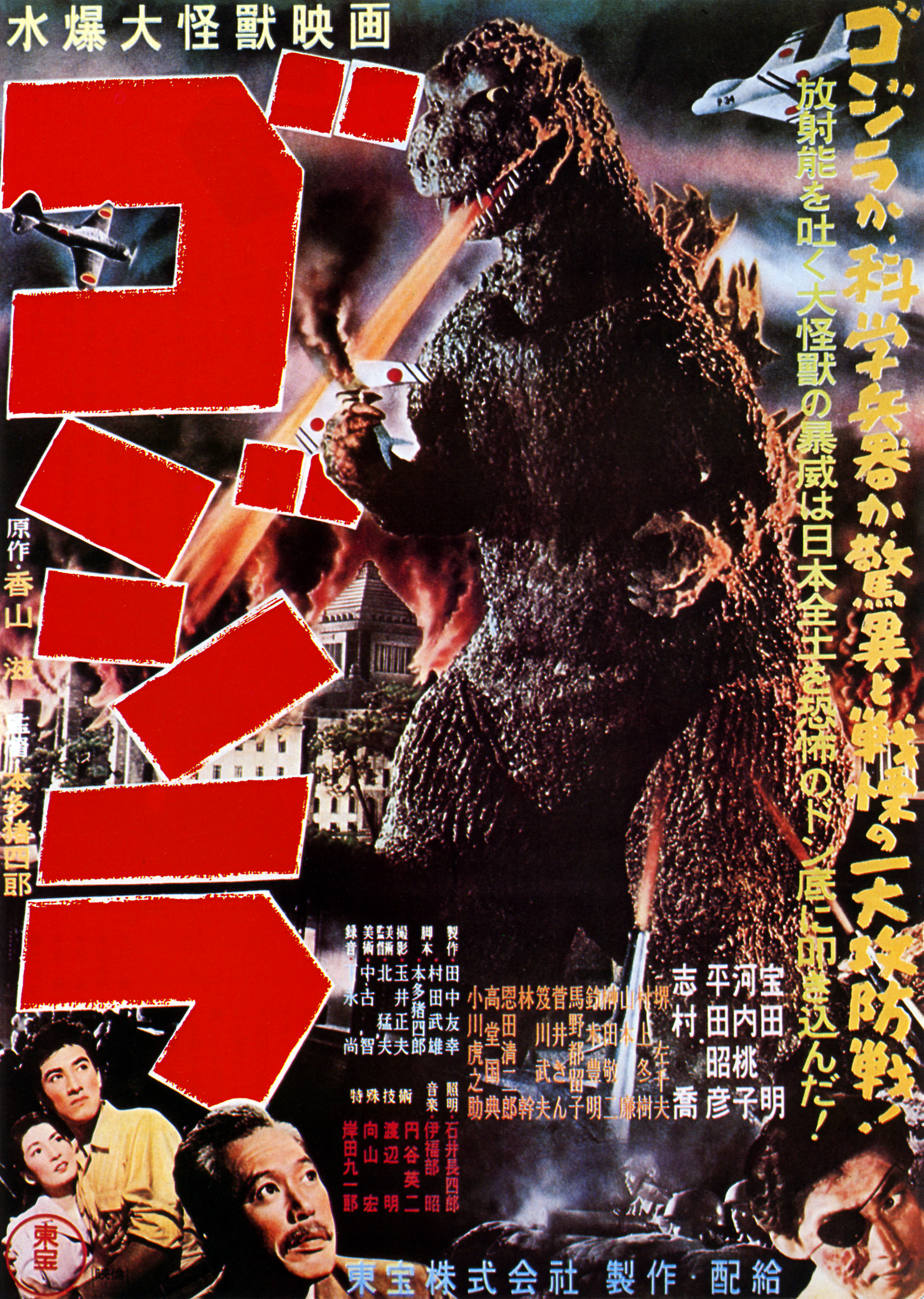
The 1954 film Godzilla is often considered a pioneer of kaiju eiga, establishing the template for tokusatsu media.

Kaiju (怪獣(かいじゅう), kaijū; lit. 'strange beast') is a term used in film and media for a subgenre of monster films produced in Japan known as kaiju eiga (monster films), also serving as a subgenre of tokusatsu (special effects filmmaking). Similar to its Western counterpart, kaiju eiga usually depict creatures of varying origins and sizes attacking cities or towns, usually in Japan, and battling the Japan Self-Defense Forces, other monsters, or both. Unlike Western monster films, kaiju eiga have often incorporated social and political commentary that reflected the times. While not the first monster film or character, the 1954 film Godzilla is often credited for pioneering the kaiju subgenre, and establishing the template, largely thanks to effects director Eiji Tsuburaya, for tokusatsu that would go on to affect Japan's film industry.

Historically, giant movie monsters were known in Japanese as daikaijū (大怪獣 lit. 'giant monster'); however, the broader term of "kaiju" has largely replaced this. The term can also either refer to the monsters themselves or the movie genre in which they appear. In contrast to "giant movie monster", the term "kaiju" is generally used to specifically refer to the Japanese style of giant monster media, which traditionally uses actors in monster suits and scale model sets. Its widespread contemporary use is credited to tokusatsu (special effects) director Eiji Tsuburaya and filmmaker Ishirō Honda, who popularized the Japanese kaiju film genre by creating the Godzilla franchise and its spin-offs.

The first "giant monster movie" is debatable. The 1921 animated short film The Pet (1921) features a giant monster attacking a city, and the 1925 silent feature film The Lost World famously features a dinosaur being brought to the streets of London, subsequently inspiring the creators to make the 1933 movie King Kong. The Japanese style of giant monster movies with suitmation starts as early as the 1930s with movies such as Wasei Kingu Kongu (1933), The Great Buddha Arrival (1934), and The King Kong That Appeared in Edo (1938). The first Japanese "kaiju movie" to see international success is the 1954 feature Godzilla. When developing it, creators drew inspiration from the character of King Kong, both in its influential 1933 film and in the conception of a giant monster, establishing it as a pivotal precursor in the evolution of the genre. During their formative years, kaiju movies were generally neglected by Japanese critics, who regarded them as "juvenile gimmick", according to authors Steve Ryfle and Ed Godziszewski.

Kaiju are often somewhat metaphorical in nature; Godzilla, for example, initially served as a metaphor for nuclear weapons, reflecting the fears of post-war Japan following the atomic bombings of Hiroshima and Nagasaki and the Lucky Dragon 5 incident. Other notable examples of kaiju include Rodan, Mothra, King Ghidorah, Gamera, and King Kong.

== Etymology ==
This term first appeared in the Chinese Classic of Mountains and Seas. It was used to refer to mythical creatures and strange, imaginary beasts. The Japanese word kaijū (怪獣(かいじゅう), [kai(d)ʑɯː]) translates literally as "strange beast", and originally referred to monsters and creatures from ancient Japanese legends; it earlier appeared in the Chinese. There are no traditional depictions of kaijū or kaijū-like creatures among the yōkai of Japanese folklore, although it is possible to find megafauna in their mythology (e.g., Japanese dragons).

In Japan, the term kaiju was used to translate Western tales of monsters even before the Toho films an example of this is "The Monster of "Partridge Creek" a story published in 1908 by the French author Georges Dupuy. It is worthy of note that in the Meiji era, Jules Verne's works were introduced to the Japanese public, achieving great success around 1890.

== History ==
=== Precursors ===
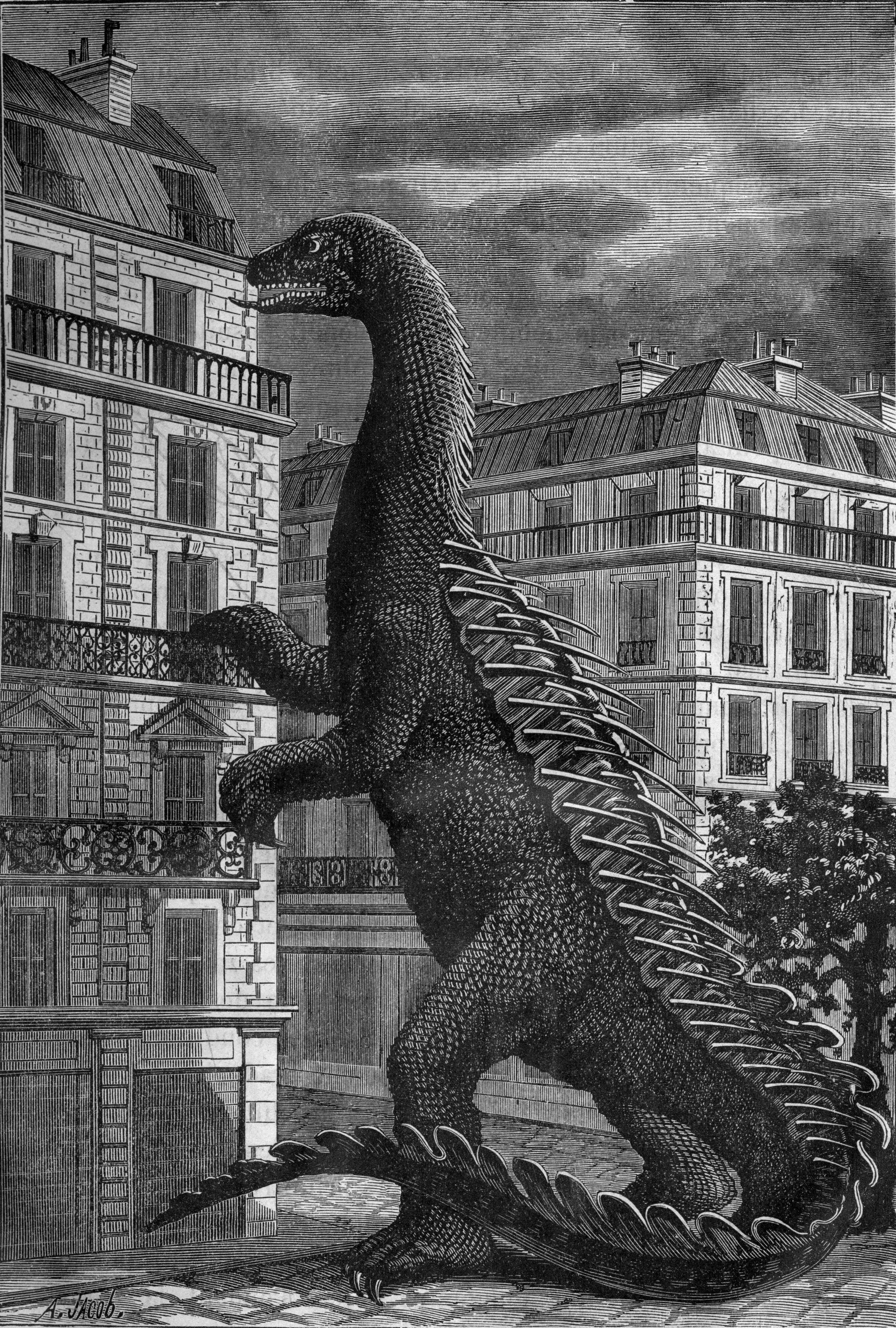
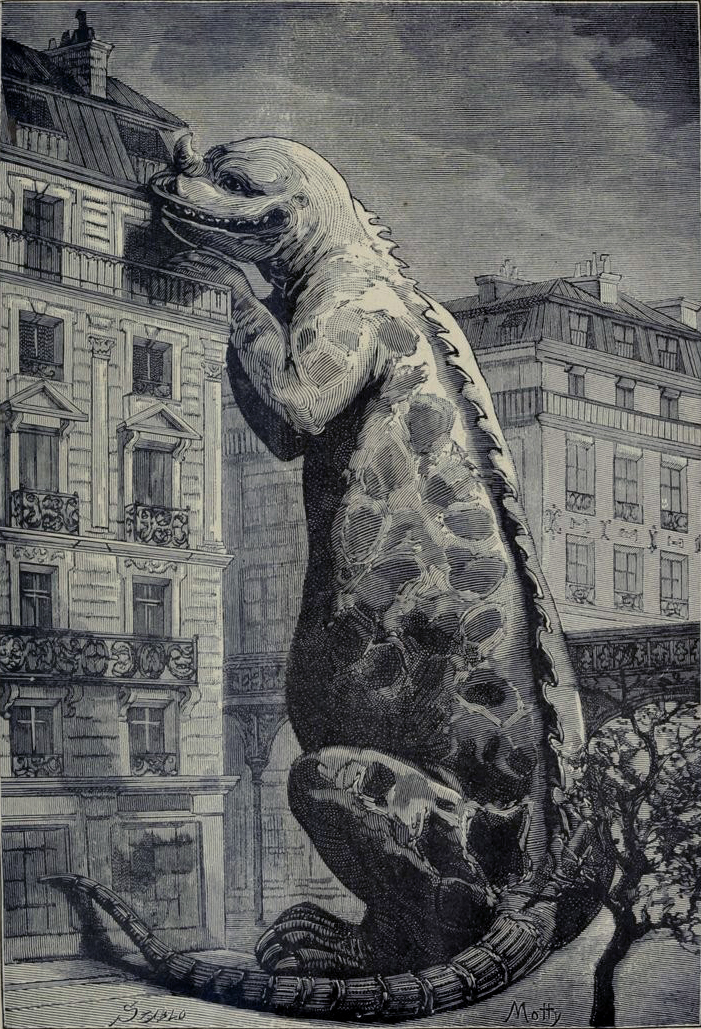
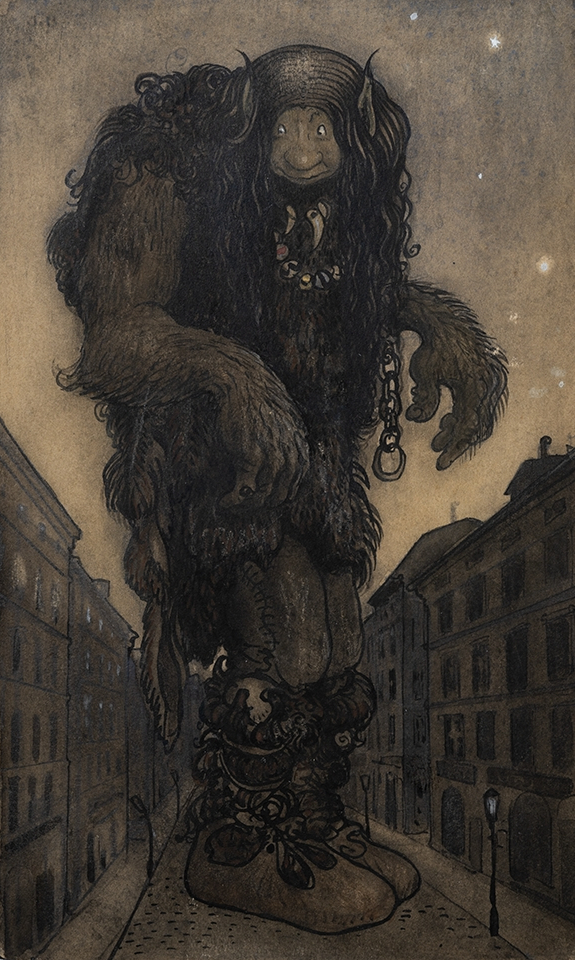
Left, center: Illustrations from Camille Flammarion's 1886 series Le Monde avant la création de l'homme ("The World Before Man's Creation") featuring bipedal dinosaurs in modern society.
Right: The giant that slept for 5,000 years, by John Bauer (1882–1918).

The idea of giant monsters in city environments appear variously before the 20th century. A noteworthy example includes Camille Flammarion's Le Monde avant la création de l'homme ("The World Before Man's Creation") series in 1886, which includes several illustrations that depict appearances of bipedal dinosaurs in period society.

A 7000 word feature article published in the Chicago Tribune and other American newspapers on April 1, 1906 told the story of a purported recent invasion of Chicago by "hordes of prehistoric monsters, dealing death and destruction". The article included eight doctored photographs showing gigantic sauropods, tyrannosaurs, pterosaurs and other creatures attacking or otherwise interacting with famous Chicago landmarks such as the Art Institute of Chicago, the Montgomery Ward Building tower and the Lincoln Park Zoo.

Genre elements were present at the end of Winsor McCay's 1921 animated short The Pet in which a mysterious giant animal starts destroying the city, until it is countered by a massive airstrike. It was based on a 1905 episode of McCay's comic strip series Dreams of the Rarebit Fiend. It is likely the earliest "giant monster attacking a city" on film.

==== Prehistoric monster movies (1920s) ====
The first feature films starring giant movie monsters made their debut during the interwar period. The period is defined by its use of prehistoric creatures that survived to modern times in undiscovered natural areas or through prolonged hibernation, such as natural cryopreservation in caves and icebergs, which then come into contact with troublesome humans and then begin their rampage.

The 1925 film The Lost World (adapted from Arthur Conan Doyle's 1912 novel of the same name), featured many dinosaurs, including a brontosaurus that breaks loose in London and destroys Tower Bridge. The film's layout was revolutionary and laid the foundation for future giant monster films. The film takes place on an unexplored mountain plateau like a deserted island teeming with prehistoric dinosaurs. The dinosaurs of The Lost World were animated by pioneering stop motion techniques by Willis H. O'Brien, who would some years later animate the giant gorilla-like creature breaking loose in New York City in the 1933 film King Kong. The enormous success of King Kong can be seen as the definitive breakthrough of giant monster movies. This influential achievement of King Kong paved the way for the emergence of the giant monster genre, serving as a blueprint for future kaiju productions. Its success reverberated in the film industry, leaving a lasting impact and solidifying the figure of the giant monster as an essential component in genre cinematography.

=== First Japanese kaiju movies (1930s) ===
The Japanese style of making giant monster movies, where the monster is portrayed by actors in monster suits (suitmation), first appears in the early 1930s. Early examples includes the 1933 King Kong spoof Wasei Kingu Kongu, the 1934 feature The Great Buddha Arrival, and the 1938 feature The King Kong That Appeared in Edo. Although all three films became lost during World War II, stills of the films have survived, and are some of the earliest examples of kaiju movies in Japanese cinematic history. The 1934 film presumably influenced the production of the Ultraman franchise.

The 1942 Superman animated short The Arctic Giant features a cryopreserved Tyrannosaurus which thaws out and attacks Metropolis. It is one of pioneering productions to depict a Godzilla-esque character to attack a modern civilization.

=== Mutant and atomic monster era (1950s) ===
After World War II, the roots of giant movie monsters started to shift from giant prehistoric monsters to monsters stemming from animals which had been exposed to strong radiation and then mutated into gigantic monsters, a result of the fear of nuclear proliferation that spread around the world during the Cold War.

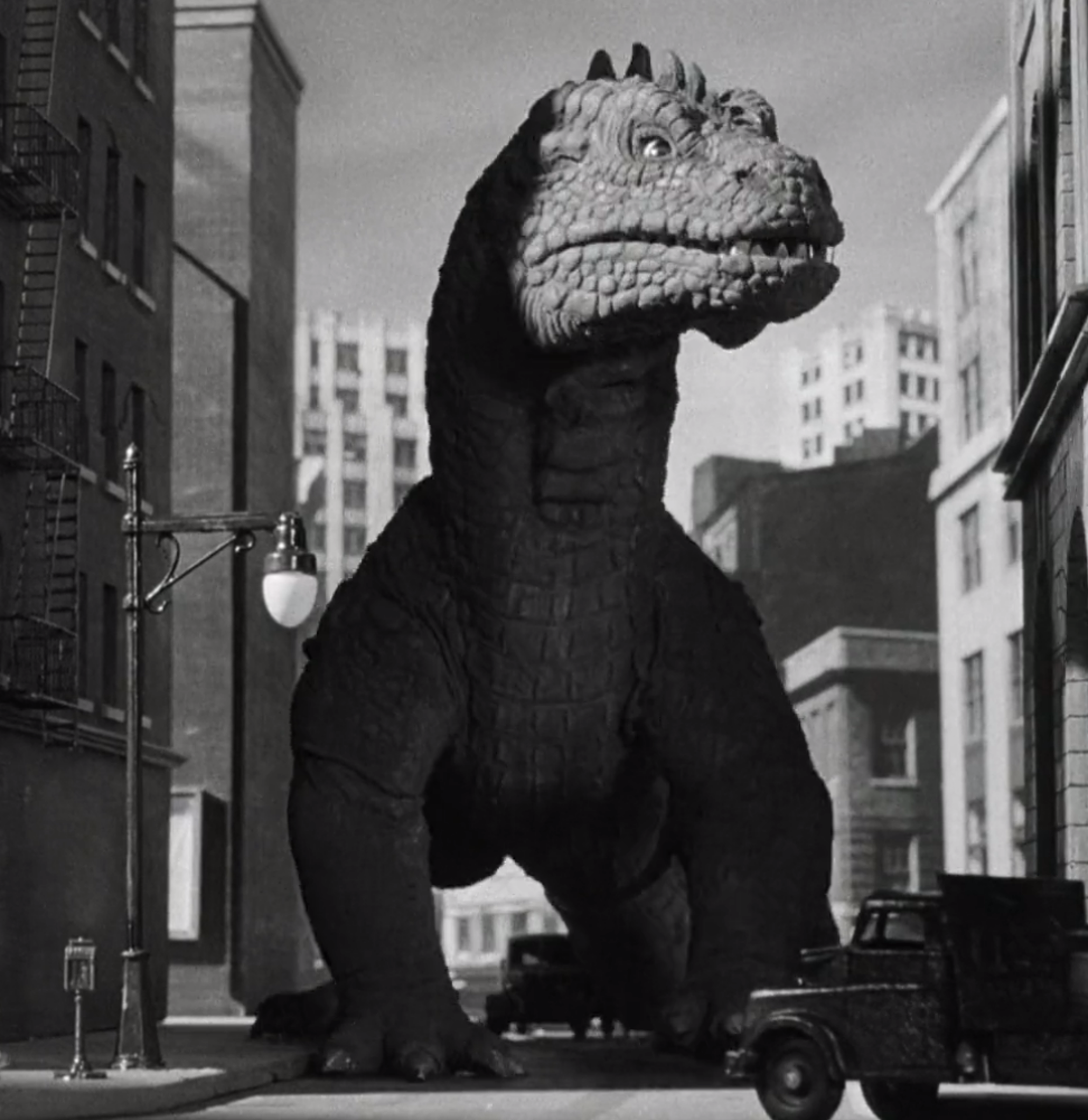
The Rhedosaurus, as depicted in The Beast from 20,000 Fathoms (1953)

One of the early prolific examples is Ray Bradbury's short story published in the Saturday Evening Post, June 23, 1951, "The Beast from 20,000 Fathoms", which came to serve as the basis for the film of the same name from 1953, featuring a fictional dinosaur, called a Rhedosaurus (animated by Ray Harryhausen), which is released from its frozen, hibernating state by an atomic bomb test within the Arctic Circle. The American movie was released in Japan in 1954 under the title The Atomic Kaiju Appears, marking the first use of the genre's name in a film title. It directly inspired Godzilla, released in 1954 (subtitled: "H-Bomb Giant Monster Movie", 水爆大怪獣映画, Suibaku Daikaiju Eiga), and many more giant monster movies of similar nature, such as Them! (featuring giant ants), Tarantula, and Attack of the 50 Foot Woman, etc.

In 1954, Tomoyuki Tanaka, a producer for Toho Studios in Tokyo, needed a film to release after his previous project was halted. Seeing how well the Hollywood giant monster movie genre films King Kong and The Beast from 20,000 Fathoms had done in Japanese box offices, and himself a fan of these films, he set out to make a new movie based on them and created Godzilla. Tanaka aimed to combine Hollywood giant monster movies with the re-emerged Japanese fears of atomic weapons that arose from the March 1954 Castle Bravo nuclear testing accident, which resulted in the spread of radioactive fallout over a vast area of the Pacific Ocean, including the Japanese Daigo Fukuryū Maru fishing boat. The incident received widespread coverage globally as one of the crew members of the boat would eventually die from his exposures, and a nationwide panic on tuna consumption resulted after it was discovered the ship's contaminated haul had been entered into market circulation. The accident also stimulated Japanese public interest in discussing the atomic bombings of Hiroshima and Nagasaki, which had largely been censored by the American authorities during the Occupation of Japan, which had only ended two years prior. With this recent history in mind, Tanaka put a team together and created the concept of a giant radioactive creature emerging from the depths of the ocean, a creature that would become the monster Godzilla. Godzilla initially had commercial success in Japan, inspiring other kaiju movies.

Following the success of Godzilla's first appearance, Toho followed up the following year with a sequel, called Godzilla Raids Again, which introduced the concept of the "monster fight", in which two Kaiju fight one another. In the movie, Godzilla faces off with another kaiju monster called Anguirus, which is the first monster, aside Godzilla, to be introduced into the Godzilla franchise.

=== 1960s-1970s ===
During the 1960s, the Japanese studio Toho started to experiment with having kaiju from different movies fight one another, culminating in RKO Pictures later licensing King Kong to Toho, resulting in the co-productions King Kong vs. Godzilla (1962) and King Kong Escapes (1967), both directed by Ishirō Honda.

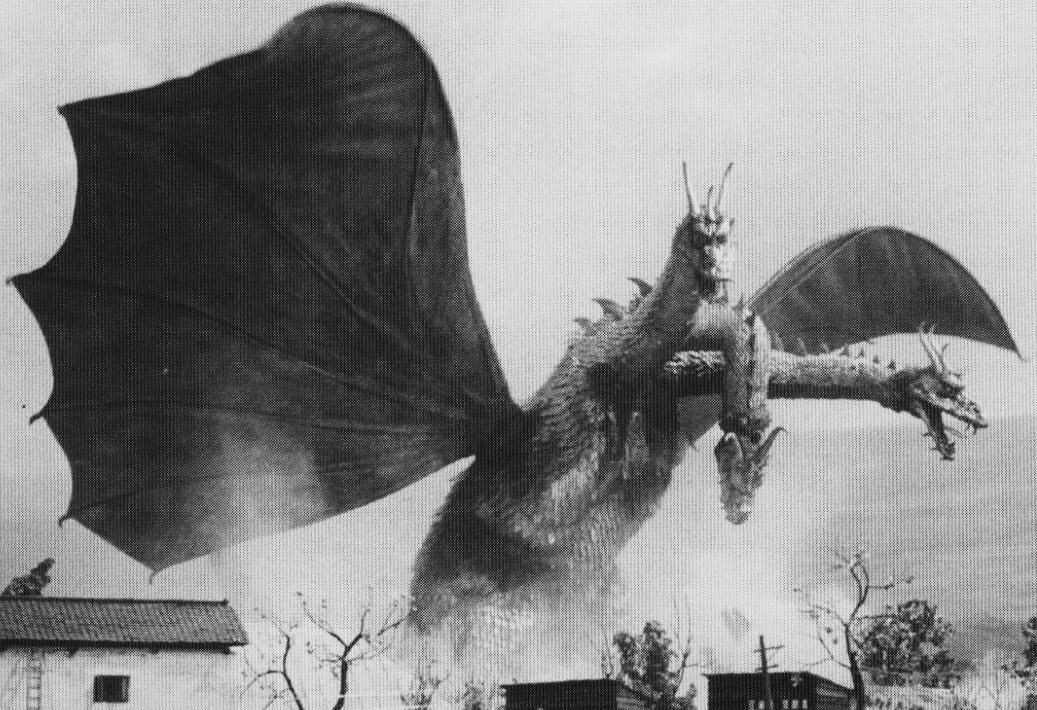
King Ghidorah, as depicted behind the scenes of Ghidorah, the Three-Headed Monster

With the advent of the Space Race and Space Age, themes of giant monsters from outer space and alien invasions started to appear in kaiju movies. Examples include the Godzilla film Ghidorah, the Three-Headed Monster, where the "space dragon" King Ghidorah is introduced for the first time, but also more obscure films such as The X from Outer Space. Giant monsters from outer space are traditionally associated with fictional aliens who bring them to Earth to conquer the planet or similar.

During the 1960s, a rival franchise to Godzilla would also be launched by Japanese studio Daiei Film, introducing the giant monster turtle Gamera, which have come to play a significant role in forming the genre along with the Godzilla franchise and the Ultra Series.

== Terminology ==
=== Kaiju ===
In Japanese media, the term kaijū generally refers to large monsters and thereof, but in Western popculture it has been borrowed as a synonym for "giant (movie) monster" and thereof, but it can also specifically refer to ditto in Japanese popculture.

Such can be antagonistic, protagonistic, or a neutral force of nature. Some are, in essence, merely "big animals", such as King Kong, and the Rhedosaurus from The Beast from 20,000 Fathoms, while others are more alien, like "Hail Mary" from the Invincible series, a giant quadruped animal with squid-tentacles on the face. Others are often preternatural creatures of divine power. Godzilla, for example, from its first appearance in the initial 1954 entry in the Godzilla franchise, has manifested all of these aspects. Other examples of kaiju include Rodan, Mothra, King Ghidorah, Anguirus, Agon, Gamera, Mechagodzilla, Baragon, Varan, Gigan, Megalon, The Cloverfield Monster, Maguma, Gorgo, The Giant Claw, Gappa, Guilala, and Yongary and gomora.

As a noun, kaijū is an invariant, as both the singular and the plural expressions are identical: "a kaiju" and "several kaiju".

==== Daikaiju ====
Daikaijū (大怪獣) is the Japanese term equivalent to "giant movie monster" and literally translates as "giant kaiju" or "great kaiju". This hyperbolic term was used to denote greatness of the subject kaiju, the prefix dai- emphasizing great size, power, and/or status. The first known appearance of the term daikaiju in the 20th Century was in the publicity materials for the original 1954 release of Godzilla. Specifically, in the subtitle on the original movie poster, Suibaku Daikaiju Eiga (水爆大怪獣映画), lit. 'H-Bomb Giant Monster Movie'.

Gamera, the Giant Monster, the first film of the Gamera franchise in 1965, also utilized the term, where the Japanese title of the film is Daikaijū Gamera (大怪獣ガメラ; lit. 'Giant Monster Gamera'), as did The X from Outer Space from 1967, where the Japanese title is Uchū Daikaijū Girara (宇宙大怪獣ギララ; lit. 'Cosmic Giant Monster Guilala').

=== Kaijin ===
Kaijin (怪人 lit. 'Strange person') refers to distorted human beings or humanoid-like creatures. The origin of kaijin goes back to the early 20th Century Japanese literature, starting with Edogawa Rampo's 1936 novel, The Fiend with Twenty Faces. The story introduced Edogawa's master detective, Kogoro Akechi's arch-nemesis, the eponymous "Fiend", a mysterious master of disguise, whose real face was unknown; the Moriarty to Akechi's Sherlock. Catching the public's imagination, many such literary and movie (and later television) villains took on the mantle of kaijin. To be clear, kaijin is not an offshoot of kaiju. The first-ever kaijin that appeared on film was The Great Buddha Arrival a lost film, made in 1934. After the Pacific War, the term was modernized when it was adopted to describe the bizarre, genetically engineered and cybernetically enhanced evil humanoid spawn conceived for the Kamen Rider Series in 1971. This created a new splinter of the term, which quickly propagated through the popularity of superhero programs produced from the 1970s, forward. These kaijin possess rational thought and the power of speech, as do human beings. A successive kaijin menagerie, in diverse iterations, appeared over numerous series, most notably the Super Sentai programs premiering in 1975 (later carried over into Super Sentai's English iteration as Power Rangers in the 1990s).

This created yet another splinter, as the kaijin of Super Sentai have since evolved to feature unique forms and attributes (e.g., gigantism), existing somewhere between kaijin and kaiju.

=== Seijin ===
Seijin (星人 lit. 'star people'), appears within Japanese words for extraterrestrial aliens, such as Kaseijin (火星人), which means "Martian". Aliens can also be called uchūjin (宇宙人) which means "spacemen". Among the best known Seijin in the genre can be found in the Ultra Series, such as Alien Baltan from Ultraman, a race of cicada-like aliens who have gone on to become one of the franchise's most enduring and recurring characters other than the Ultras themselves.

Toho has produced a variety of kaiju films over the years (many of which feature Godzilla, Rodan, and Mothra), but other Japanese studios contributed to the genre by producing films and shows of their own: Daiei Film (Kadokawa Pictures), Tsuburaya Productions, and Shochiku and Nikkatsu Studios.

== Monster techniques ==
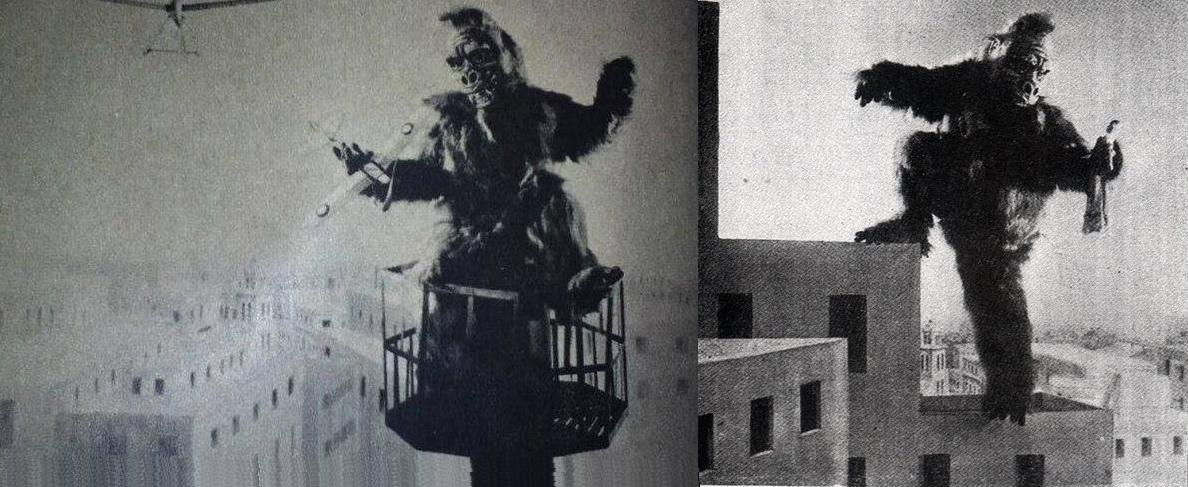
Wasei Kingu Kongu (1933), one of the earliest cases of suitmation

Eiji Tsuburaya, who was in charge of the special effects for Godzilla, developed a technique to animate the kaiju that became known colloquially as "suitmation". Where Western monster movies often used stop motion to animate the monsters, Tsubaraya decided to attempt to create suits, called "creature suits", for a human (suit actor) to wear and act in. This was combined with the use of miniature models and scaled-down city sets to create the illusion of a giant creature in a city. Due to the extreme stiffness of the latex or rubber suits, filming would often be done at double speed, so that when the film was shown, the monster was smoother and slower than in the original shot.

Kaiju films also used a form of puppetry interwoven between suitmation scenes for shots that were physically impossible for the suit actor to perform. From the 1998 release of Godzilla, American-produced kaiju films strayed from suitmation to computer-generated imagery (CGI). In Japan, CGI and stop-motion have been increasingly used for certain special sequences and monsters, but suitmation has been used for an overwhelming majority of kaiju films produced in Japan of all eras.

== Selected media ==
=== Manga ===
- Cloverfield/Kishin (Kadokawa Shoten; 2008)
- Godzilla manga (Toho, Shogakukan, Kodansha; 1954–present)
- Go Nagai Creator of Kaijus
  - Garla (ガルラ, garura)(June 1976 – March 1978 Published by Tomy Company, Ltd.)
  - MachineSaur (マシンザウラー, マシンサウル, Machine Sauer, Mashinzaura)(December 1979 – March 1986 Published by Tomy Company, Ltd.)
- Attack on Titan (Kodansha; 2009–2021)
- Kaiju Girl Caramelise (2018)
- Neon Genesis Evangelion (Kadokawa Shoten; 1994 – 2013)
- ULTRAMAN (Shogakukan; 2011–present)
- Kiriwo Terrible (Shounen Sunday; 2014)
- Kaiju Kamui (Young Magazine; 2024-2025)
- Kaiju No. 8 (Shueisha; 2020–2025)
- Snowball Earth (Shogakukan; 2021–present)
- GAEA-TIMA the Gigantis (Kodansha; 2023-present)

=== Novels ===
- Nemesis Saga by Jeremy Robinson (St Martins Press/Breakneck Media; 2013–2016). A series of six novels featuring Nemesis, Karkinos, Typhon, Scylla, Drakon, Scryon, Giger, Lovecraft, Ashtaroth and Hyperion (Mechakaiju)
- The Kaiju Preservation Society by John Scalzi (Tor; 2022).
- Helix-14: Origins by Owen Bauerson (2022).

=== Comics ===
- Godzilla comics (Toho, Marvel Comics, Dark Horse Comics, IDW; 1976–present)
- Tokyo Storm Warning (Wildstorm; 2003)
- Enormous (Image Comics; 2012, 2014, 2021–present)
- The Kaiju Score (AfterShock; 2020–present)
- The Stone King (ComiXology Original; 2018–present)
- Dinosaurs Attack! (Topps Comics/IDW; 1988, 2013)
- The Nemesis Saga comics by Jeremy Robinson and Matt Frank (American Gothic Press/IDW Publishing; 2015–2016)
- Behemoth (Dark Horse Comics; 2025–present)

=== Video games ===
- Godzilla video games (Toho, Pipeworks, Bandai; 1983–present)
- Ultraman video games (Tsuburaya; 1984–present)
- Gamera Video games (Kadokawa of Games; 1995–present as North American released)
- Time Gal (Taito; 1985)
- Shadow of the Colossus (developed by SCE Japan Studio and Team Ico, and published by Sony Computer Entertainment, 2005)
  - Shadow of the Colossus remake (developed by Bluepoint Games, and published by Sony Interactive Entertainment, 2018)
- King of the Monsters (SNK; 1991)
- Rampage (1986) (formerly owned by Midway Games and now owned by its successor Warner Bros. Interactive Entertainment; 2021)
  - Rampage: Total Destruction (Midway Games, 2006)
- Dawn of the Monsters (Developed by 13AM Games and published by WayForward, 2022) as a spiritual successor to SNK's King of the Monsters
- Megaton Musashi (Developed by Level-5, 2021, 2022)
- Roarr! The Adventures of Rampage Rex – Jurassic Edition (Born Lucky Games, 2018)
- Terror of Hemasaurus (Developed by Loren Lemcke and published by Digerati Distribution, 2022, 2023)
- GigaBash (Passion Republic, 2022)
- Robot Alchemic Drive (Sandlot; 2002)
- DEMOLITION ROBOTS K.K. (, 2020, 2021) – Mechas A Former Dystopian Wars/Robot Killer.
- War of the Monsters (Sony, Incognito Entertainment; 2003)
- Peter Jackson's King Kong (2005)
- Pacific Rim video game (Yuke's/Reliance; 2013)
- City Shrouded in Shadow (Bandai Namco Entertainment; 2017)
- Colossal Kaiju Combat (Sunstone Games; Cancelled)
- 13 Sentinels: Aegis Rim (Sega, Atlus, Vanillaware, 2019)
- Fight Crab (2020–21, – stage City rampage)
- DAIKAIJU DAIKESSEN (2019, 2021, 2024 OneSecretPseudo)
- Attack of the Giant Crab (2022)
- I am Titan (2024, Entity3)
- Beastlink(2027 Upcoming, Grove Street Games)
- Excidio The Kaiju Simulator (Developed and published by TokuPop, 2026)
- Terror of the Titans (Developed and published by TokuPop, 2028) as a spiritual successor to Sony's War of the Monsters)

=== Board games ===
- Godzilla Game
- Godzilla: Tokyo Clash
- Smash Up
- Monsterpocalypse
- King of Tokyo
- King of New York
- Monsters Menace America
- Smash City
- The Creature That Ate Sheboygan
- Campy Creatures

=== Television ===
- Marine Kong (Nisan Productions; April 3 – September 25, 1960)
- Ultra Series (Tsuburaya Productions; January 2, 1966–present)
- Ambassador Magma (P Productions; July 4, 1966 – September 25, 1967)
- The King Kong Show (Toei Animation; September 10, 1966 – August 31, 1969)
- Kaiju Booska (Tsuburaya Productions; November 9, 1966 – September 27, 1967)
- Captain Ultra (Toei Company; April 16 – September 24, 1967)
- Kaiju ouji (P Productions; October 2, 1967 – March 25, 1968)
- Giant Robo (Toei Company; October 11, 1967 – April 1, 1968)
- Giant Phantom Monster Agon (Nippon Television; January 2–8, 1968)
- Mighty Jack (Tsuburaya Productions; April 6 – June 29, 1968)
- Spectreman (P Productions; January 2, 1971 – March 25, 1972)
- Kamen Rider (Toei Company; April 3, 1971–present)
- Silver Kamen (Senkosha Productions; November 28, 1971 – May 21, 1972)
- Mirrorman (Tsuburaya Productions; December 5, 1971 – November 26, 1972)
- Redman (Tsuburaya Productions; April 3 – September 8, 1972)
- Thunder Mask (Nippon Television; October 3, 1972 – March 27, 1973)
- Ike! Godman (Toho Company; October 5, 1972 – April 10, 1973)
- Assault! Human!! (Toho Company; October 7 – December 30, 1972)
- Iron King (Senkosha Productions; October 8, 1972 – April 8, 1973)
- Jumborg Ace (Tsuburaya Productions; January 17 – December 29, 1973)
- Fireman (Tsuburaya Productions; January 17 – July 31, 1973)
- Demon Hunter Mitsurugi (International Television Films and Fuji TV; January 8, 1973 – March 26, 1973)
- Zone Fighter (Toho Company; April 2 – September 24, 1973)
- Super Robot Red Baron (Nippon Television; July 4, 1973 – March 27, 1974)
- Kure Kure Takora (Toho Company; October 1, 1973 – September 27, 1974)
- Ike! Greenman (Toho Company; November 12, 1973 – September 27, 1974)
- Super Sentai (Toei Company; April 3, 1975–present)
- Daitetsujin 17 (Toei Company; March 18, 1977 - November 11, 1977)
- Super Robot Mach Baron (Nippon Television; October 7, 1974 – March 31, 1975)
- Dinosaur War Izenborg (Tsuburaya Productions; October 17, 1977 – June 30, 1978)
- Spider-Man (Toei Company and Marvel Comics; May 17, 1978 – March 14, 1979)
- Godzilla (Hanna-Barbera; September 9, 1978 – December 8, 1979)
- Megaloman (Toho Company; May 7 – December 24, 1979)
- Metal Hero Series (Toei Company; March 5, 1982 - January 24, 1999)
- Godzilland (Toho Company; 1992 – 1996)
- Gridman the Hyper Agent (Tsuburaya Productions; April 3, 1993 – January 8, 1994)
- Power Rangers (Saban Entertainment and Toei Company; August 28, 1993–present)
- Neon Genesis Evangelion (Gainax; October 4, 1995 – March 27, 1996)
- Godzilla Kingdom (Toho Company; October 1, 1996 – August 15, 1997)
- Godzilla Island (Toho Company; October 6, 1997 – September 30, 1998)
- Godzilla: The Series (Sony Pictures Television; September 12, 1998 – April 22, 2000)
- Godzilla TV (Toho Company; October 1999 – March 2000)
- Betterman (Sunrise; April 1, 1999 – September 30, 1999)
- Neo Ranga (Studio Pierrot; April 6, 1999 - September 28, 1999)
- Dai-Guard (Xebec; October 5, 1999 – March 28, 2000)
- Kong: The Animated Series (BKN; September 9, 2000 – March 26, 2001)
- Tekkōki Mikazuki (Media Factory; October 23, 2000 – March 24, 2001)
- SFX Giant Legend: Line (Independent; April 25 – May 26, 2003)
- Chouseishin Series (Toho Company; October 4, 2003 – June 24, 2006)
- Bio Planet WoO (Tsuburaya Productions; April 9 – August 13, 2006)
- Daimajin Kanon (Kadokawa Pictures; April 2 – October 1, 2010)
- SciFi Japan TV (ACTV Japan; August 10, 2012–present)
- Attack on Titan (Wit Studio and MAPPA; April 7, 2013 – scheduled)
- Kong: King of the Apes (Netflix; April 15, 2016 – May 4, 2018)
- Mech-X4 (Disney XD; November 11, 2016 – August 20, 2018)
- Darling in the Franxx (Studio Trigger; January 13, 2018 – July 7, 2018)
- SSSS.Gridman (Tsuburaya Productions and Studio Trigger; October 7, 2018 – December 23, 2018)
- Godziban (Toho Company; August 9, 2019–present)
- I'm Home, Chibi Godzilla (Toho Company; July 15, 2020–present)
- Pacific Rim: The Black (Polygon Pictures; March 4, 2021 – April 19, 2022)
- Godzilla Singular Point (Toho Company; April 1, 2021 – June 24, 2021)
- SSSS.Dynazenon (Tsuburaya Productions and Studio Trigger; April 2, 2021 – June 18, 2021)
- Super Giant Robot Brothers (Reel FX Creative Studios, Assemblage Entertainment; Netflix; August 4, 2022)
- Monarch: Legacy of Monsters (Legendary Television; Apple TV; 2023–present)
- Skull Island (Legendary Television; Netflix; 2023)
- Gamera Rebirth (Kadokawa Studio; Netflix; 2023)
- Kaiju No. 8 (Toho Animation and Production I.G; 2024-present)
- Snowball Earth (Toho Animation and Studio Kai; 2026-present)
