= King Kong Appears in Edo =

The King Kong That Appeared in Edo
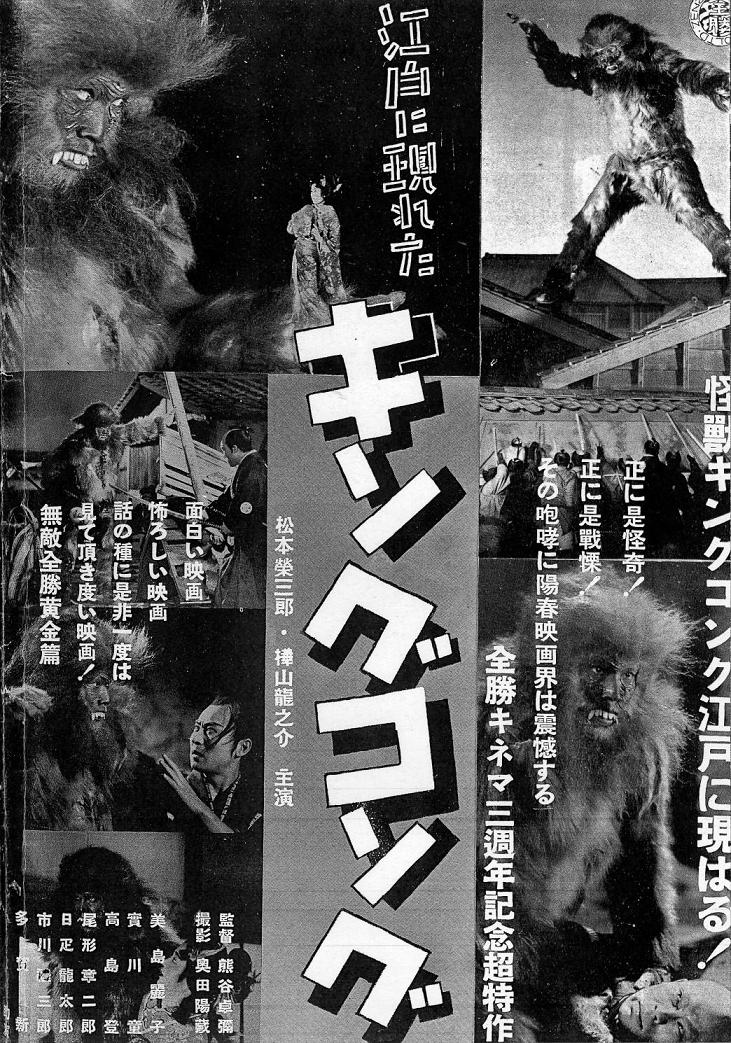
- Advertisement for the film, published in the April 14, 1938 issue of Kinema Junpo
- Directed by: Sōya Kumagai
- Written by: Daijō Aoyama
- Starring: Eizaburo Matsumoto; Ryūnosuke Kabayama; Reizaburo Ichikawa; Reiko Mishima; Shōjirō Ogata; Sanshirō Mōri; Noboru Takashima
- Cinematography: Yōzō Okuda
- Distributed by: Zenshō Cinema
- Release dates: March 31, 1938 (Part I); April 7, 1938 (Part II)
- Country: Japan
- Language: Japanese

The King Kong That Appeared in Edo (江戸に現れたキングコング, Edo ni Arawareta Kingu Kongu), often translated as King Kong Appears in Edo, is a 1938 Japanese two-part silent jidaigeki film directed by Sōya Kumagai and produced by Zenshō Cinema. It is now considered to be a lost film.

== Plot ==
One night, Chinami, the daughter of Hyoue Toba, is mysteriously kidnapped. Hyoue offers a large reward for his daughter's rescue. Yuzuru Kawasaki and various other men employed by Hyoue set about searching for Chinami. However one of Hyoue's men, Magonojyō Gō, does not partake in the search, because he was the one who had Chinami kidnapped. Magonojyō's father Senbei has a trained pet ape named "King Kong" and Magonojyō used this creature to perform the kidnapping.

Magonojyō has a score to settle with Hyoue because he had forced Senbei to counterfeit coins. When Senbei refused to do so, he was imprisoned by Hyoue and eventually killed. This is why Magonojyō disguised his identity and went to work for Hyoue, to get close to him in order to get revenge.

Magonojyō eventually corners Hyoue and threatens him with the ape. He offers to give him the whereabouts of Chinami in exchange for the reward money. The ape then takes Hyoue to Magonojyō's secret cellar as a prisoner. The ape then goes berserk and kills Hyoue but is then fatally wounded by Hyoue's men. While all this is happening, Magonojyō leaves Edo with the reward money.

== Cast ==
- Ryūnosuke Kabayama as Anthropoid
- Eizaburo Matsumoto as Magonojo Go
- Reizaburo Ichikawa as Hyoe Toba
- Reiko Mishima as Chinami

== Production ==
This silent period piece drama film was produced in 1938 by Zenshō Cinema, which had never obtained rights permission from RKO Pictures, the company that owned the name "King Kong" at that time. The film was broken into two parts. The first part, called Edo ni Arawareta Kingu Kongu: Henge no Maki / 江戸に現れたキングコング:変化の巻 (The King Kong That Appeared in Edo: The Episode of the Monster), was released on March 31, 1938, while the second part, called Edo ni Arawareta Kingu Kongu: Ōgon no Maki / 江戸に現れたキングコング:黄金の巻 (The King Kong That Appeared in Edo: The Episode of Gold), was released a week later on April 7, 1938. Both films ran 5 reels in length and premiered at the Yûrakukan theater in Asakusa, Tokyo.

Going by the plot synopsis as well as flyers promoting the film, it is believed by historians that the ape (looking more like a yeti) is referred to as "King Kong" in name only and does not appear gigantic outside of promotional photos. These photos that appear on the film's flyers and advertisements depict him being so big that he is holding Chinami in the palm of his hand and is straddling buildings as he faces down Hyoue Toba's men. This, along with the fact that Zensho was a typical Poverty Row studio that did not have sound recording equipment (none of the 173 films they produced between 1936 and 1941 were talkies), leads to the belief that Zensho was simply trying to capitalize on King Kong's 1938 re-issue in that country by promoting the ape as giant.

However, suit creator and actor Ryūnosuke Kabayama (who later changed his name to Fuminori Ohashi and created the ape creatures seen in the 1956 films 水戸黄門 怪力類人猿 [Mito Kōmon: Kairiki Ruijinen] and 水戸黄門漫遊記 人喰い狒々 [Mito Kōmon Manyūki: Hitokui Hihi], as well as the suit for Godzilla in the original 1954 film) and various other tokusatsu productions (Note: His careers to involve monsters (kaiju) and creatures and giant robots include Toho's Half Human and The Mysterians, Daiei Film's productions such as The Whale God (Killer Whale) and The Demon of Mount Oe and Akado Suzunosuke series, Giant Phantom Monster Agon by Nippon TV, Legend of Dinosaurs & Monster Birds by Toei Company, the live-drama adaptation of Ambassador Magma and I am Kappa (おらあカッパだ) by Tokyu Agency, Kaiju ouji by Fuji Television, SF Monster Grand Strategy (SFモンスター大作戦) and Jungle Prince by Nippon Denpa Eiga, Planet of the Apes by 20th Century-Fox, and so on. He also lessoned Ryosaku Takayama for Tsuburaya Productions's Ultra Q after The Whale God (Killer Whale).) stated in a 1988 interview: "The first model making to be counted as 'special art direction' in Japanese cinema was a giant gorilla which I did for the movie The King Kong That Appeared in Edo fifty years ago. It was also the first movie to feature certain kinds of special effects." With this statement from the suits creator, there seems to be some contradiction over the actual size of the title character.

== See also ==
- Wasei Kingu Kongu
- List of lost films
