= Kyodai Hero =

Japanese fiction genre

Ultraman, is Japan's first and most famous Kyodai Hero

Kyodai Hero (巨大ヒーロー, Kyodai Hīrō; lit. 'Giant Hero') is a television subgenre in tokusatsu that involves Japanese superheroes or robots either with the ability to grow to immense heights to fight giant monsters or who are originally giant as a part of their lives. These heroes are always depicted as protectors of humanity. The genre started in the 1960s.

One of the earliest and most famous Kyodai heroes is Ultraman who made his debut in 1966. Since then, Ultraman has helped spawn the Kyodai Hero genre with countless shows, franchises and films such as Go! Godman and Iron King.

== 1960s ==
The inception of the Kyodai Hero genre initially began with Godzilla in the film Ghidorah, the Three-Headed Monster. Godzilla is portrayed as a personified natural disaster at first but over the course of the film franchise's many monster battles, he is gradually put into the position of protector of the human race, a key trope of the Kyodai Hero genre. Though Godzilla established the minor concept of the Kyodai Hero, the genre technically began with P-Productions' live action adaptation of Osamu Tezuka's Ambassador Magma which predated the popular Ultraman franchise, by six days.

Ultraman was created by the Godzilla films' Special Effects Director and Supervisor Eiji Tsuburaya. Ultraman (a sequel series to the previous Tokusatsu kaiju series Ultra Q) quickly became very popular in its initial run, to the point that Tsuburaya Productions produced sequel show Ultraseven, the second Kyodai Hero show ever produced – this series introduced another trope characteristic of the genre, in that the hero mainly fought aliens and their monster subordinates throughout the show. Ultraseven was the final Tokusatsu Kyodai Hero show produced by Eiji Tsuburaya before his death in 1970. Since then, the increase in Ultraman's popularity was so great that Tsuburaya Productions decided to revive the franchise in 1970 with The Return of Ultraman, thus creating a series of Ultraman shows which continues to the present day, referred to as the Ultra Series.

== 1970s ==
The 1970s saw the uprising of Tokusatsu and Kyodai Hero shows, which coexisted with and helped shape kaiju films of the era. Tsuburaya Productions restarted the Ultraman series with The Return of Ultraman. This reignited high interest in studios to produce their own tokusatsu shows. Many of the tokusatsu shows from the 70s era mainly featured Kyodai heroes such as Spectreman and Super Robot Red Baron. By 1975, Tokusatsu shows were highly popular in Asia. In Spider-Man, the show has Spider-Man facing the kaiju in a giant mecha after facing it in a human-sized form.

Toho Studios even invented its own Kyodai hero to fight alongside Godzilla, Jet Jaguar in the film Godzilla vs. Megalon, which introduced numerous other Tokusatsu heroes throughout the 1970s, including Godman, Megaloman, and Greenman. In Hong Kong, Shaw Brothers Studio produced its own Henshin/Kyodai Hero as well with The Super Inframan. Though stylistically more akin to Kamen Rider, Inframan mixed Kyodai Hero elements into its formula, allowing the titular hero to grow to gigantic size.

== Style and techniques ==
A Kyodai Hero property usually involves a human (either a host to the hero, or simply a human form) who transforms into the hero or. From there, they can change to an enormous size to battle a giant monster or aliens. The special effect techniques usually use suitmation and scale models.

== List of Kyodai Hero characters ==
- Ultraman and the rest of his kind from the Ultra Series
- Aegis Prime (from Dawn of the Monsters)
- Ambassador Magma
- Astro Guy (from King of the Monsters)
- Atomic Guy (from King of the Monsters 2)
- Daitetsujin 17
- Alien Emerald Kain (from Jumborg Ace)
- Fireman
- Ganbaron
- Giant Robo (tokusatsu)
- Gigaman (from GigaBash)
- Godman
- Greenman
- Gridman the Hyper Agent (adapted into the US as Superhuman Samurai Syber Squad)
- Iron King
- Monster Prince
- Izenborg
- Jaguarman (from an aborted TV series)
- Jet Jaguar (from Godzilla vs Megalon)
- Jumborg 9 (from Jumborg Ace)
- Jumborg Ace
- Kamen Rider J
- Line
- Mach Baron
- Majin Hunter Mitsurugi
- Megaloman
- Mirrorman
- Mirrorman Reflex
- Red Baron
- Redman
- Metal Kaiser
- Silver Kamen
- Spectreman
- Tekkoki Mikazuki
- Thunder Mask
- WoO
- Magirangers (Team)/Mystic Rangers
- Way Big (from Ben 10)
- Zone Fighter
