= Nagoya Broadcasting Network =

Japanese TV station

JOLX-DTV
- Logo used since 2003.

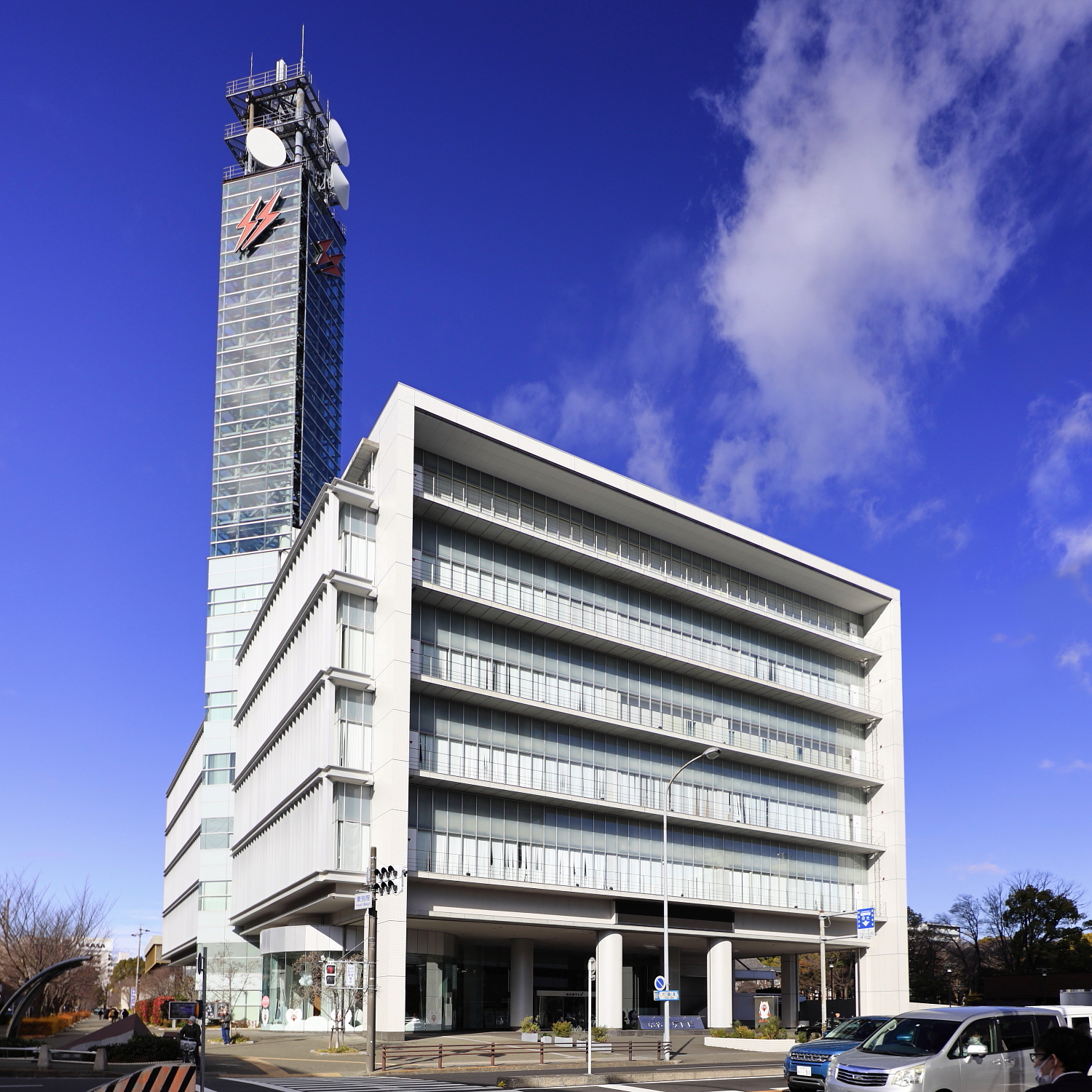
- Headquarters in Naka-ku, Nagoya
- Chubu region; Japan
- City: Nagoya, Aichi Prefecture
- Channels: Digital: 22 (UHF); Virtual: 6
- Branding: Mētele; Nagoya TV

Programming
- Language: Japanese
- Affiliations: All-Nippon News Network

Ownership
- Owner: Nagoya Broadcasting Network Co., Ltd.

History
- First air date: April 1, 1962; 64 years ago
- Former call signs: JOLX-TV (1962–2011)
- Former channel numbers: Analog: 11 (VHF, 1962–2011)
- Former affiliations: NTV/NNN/NNS (April 1, 1962 – March 31, 1973)
- Call sign meaning: "Local X"

Technical information
- Licensing authority: MIC
- Transmitter coordinates: 35°10′20.7″N 136°54′30″E

Links
- Website: https://www.nagoyatv.com

Corporate information
- Native name: 名古屋テレビ放送株式会社 (Note: Previously spelled as 名古屋放送株式会社 (Nagoya Hōsō Kabushiki-gaisha) from 1961 to 1987)
- Romanized name: Nagoya Terebi Hōsō Kabushiki-gaisha
- Type: Private
- Founded: September 6, 1961
- Founder: Shotaro Kamiya
- Headquarters: 2-10-1, Tachibana, Naka-ku, Nagoya, Aichi Prefecture, Japan
- Key people: Takaya Kano (president and CEO)
- Owner: The Asahi Shimbun (36.9%); TV Asahi Holdings (17.3%); Toyota (34.6%; largest single shareholder)
- Number of employees: 255 (April 2021)
- Footnotes; Data from its company profile

JOLX-DTV (channel 6), branded as Mētele (メ～テレ, Mētere) is the Chūbu region flagship station of the All-Nippon News Network, owned by the Nagoya Broadcasting Network Co., Ltd. (Japanese: 名古屋テレビ放送株式会社, Hepburn: Nagoya Terebi Hōsō Kabushiki gaisha), with its headquarters in Nagoya. It is broadcast in Aichi Prefecture, Gifu Prefecture, and Mie Prefecture.

The station is well known among anime fans for its close association with the anime studio Sunrise, including participating in the production of such works as Mobile Suit Gundam, Zambot 3 (and its successor Daitarn 3), and Yoroiden Samurai Troopers.

== Capital composition ==
Information as of March 31, 2021:

Capital	Total number of shares issued	Number of shareholders
400,000,000 yen	800,000 stocks	19

Shareholders	Number of shares held	Proportion
Toyota	277,000 shares	34.62%
Asahi Shimbun	156,500 shares	19.56%
TV Asahi Holdings Corporation	138,500 shares	17.31%
Yomiuri Shimbun (Tokyo Head Office)	80,000 shares	10.00%
Nippon TV	45,000 shares	5.62%

== History ==
=== License ===
On November 24, 1959, Shotaro Kamiya, the then-president of Toyota Motors Sales Division, alongside ten other people, set up a license for Chūkyō Television Broadcasting, (Note: Unrelated to Chukyo TV, which Nagoya TV had swapped networks in 1973) for the license of the third television station in the Tokai area. At that time there were an initial total of 9 companies which was later reduced to 5 companies (after 4 of the companies agreed to merge with Chukyo TV). On July 14, 1961, the Ministry of Posts and Telecommunications (current Ministry of Internal Affairs and Communications) awarded the license to Chukyo TV being designated on channel 11. Afterwards, Chukyo TV held a founding meeting on August 30 of the same year, issued 400,000 shares, with a capital of 200 million yen. On November 25, 1961, Chukyo Television changed the company name to "Nagoya Broadcasting Co., Ltd.", referred to as "Nagoya Television", on the grounds that the place name "Nagoya" was more friendly.

=== NTV and NET years ===
On November 25, 1961, the company was renamed to Nagoya Broadcasting Network. Prior to its official broadcast, there were only two commercial broadcasters in the Tokai region: CBC (which is part of TBS) and Tokai Television (which is part of Fuji TV and NTV). Nagoya TV then decided to become an affiliate of the NTV and NET (current TV Asahi) networks, which resulted from Tokai TV to become a full-time FNN affiliate.

The first tests of NBN were held on March 10, 1962. Eventually, service tests were conducted on March 25 and regular transmissions commenced on April 1, at 6:50 am. At the beginning of its operations, 65.8% of the programs broadcast by Nagoya TV were produced by Nippon Television, 25.7% were produced by NET Television, 5.1% were produced by themselves, and 3.4% were produced by other television stations. In June 1963, the Nagoya Television Labor Union was established. The labor relations at Nagoya TV were not harmonious in the early days. In July 1966, there was an incident where union members surrounded Nagoya TV for 23 days. However, the excessive confrontational behavior of the Nagoya TV union also caused dissatisfaction among some employees. These employees established a separate "Wakatake Association" in July 1969, and the Nagoya TV union split. In 1974, with the efforts of the labor union and Wakatake Kai, Nagoya TV became the seventh private TV station in Japan to have two days off per week.

In July 1966, Nagoya TV abolished the afternoon off-air period and realized uninterrupted broadcasting throughout the day. On December 15 of the same year, Nagoya TV broadcast its first color program. In 1969, Nagoya TV implemented all news programs in color. On September 26 of the same year, Nagoya TV launched its logo, a blue 11 in the hole of a red and green oval. In June 1972, Nagoya TV was allowed to conduct independent interviews in China. This was the first time since the beginning of the Cultural Revolution that a foreign TV station was qualified to conduct independent interviews in China. Nagoya TV's long-term coverage of China was recognized by the Japan Private Broadcasting Federation Award in 1975. In 1976, Nagoya TV's 6th China coverage was edited into a 13-episode documentary and broadcast nationwide through the NET/ANN network.

=== As a sole ANN affiliate ===
Since its inception, Nagoya TV has maintained a ratio of about 60% of its broadcast programs coming from Nippon TV and about 30% from NET TV. However, this caused strong dissatisfaction with NET TV, which demanded that the ratio be changed to 5:5, one half from NTV and the other from NET. In October 1972, it intervened in the program adjustment of Nagoya TV and changed the program from 20:00 to 22:00 on Saturday night to NET TV. This move aroused strong dissatisfaction with Nippon Television, and the two went to court, and finally settled with a compromise plan of adapting one hour of the two-hour NET TV program to be broadcast. This incident became an opportunity for Nagoya TV to withdraw from the Nippon Television Network. On December 27, 1972, Nagoya TV, Chukyo TV, Nippon Television, and NET TV held a four-party meeting. After the meeting, the four parties agreed that Chukyo TV would fully become a member of the Nippon TV network, and Nagoya TV would fully become a member of the NET TV series network. When the network was switched, Nagoya TV broadcast a large number of advertisements to increase awareness of the network switch and curb the economic losses caused by this matter.

In 1976, Shotaro Kamiya resigned as the president of Nagoya TV, which was the first time the president was replaced after Nagoya TV started broadcasting. In 1979, the success of "Mobile Suit Gundam" and the special program starring then Japanese Prime Minister Masayoshi Ōhira greatly increased the national popularity of Nagoya TV. In the 2nd, 3rd and 5th weeks of April 1981, Nagoya TV won the triple crown of ratings for the first time. In 1981 and 1982, Nagoya TV ranked first in the daily ratings for two consecutive years.

In 1987, on the occasion of its 25th anniversary, Nagoya Television changed the official Japanese name of the company from "Nagoya Broadcasting" to the current "Nagoya Television Broadcasting", unified the official name and general name, and launched a new logo, while changing its English name to Nagoya TV. In the same year, Nagoya TV also launched a new morning information program "Good Morning Nagoya TV". In July 1995, Nagoya TV opened its official website, becoming the second private TV station in Japan to open an official website (after TBS). In 1996 and 1997, the 35th anniversary of its launch, Nagoya TV produced a series of special programs such as "Late Night Express '96 ~ Hot Wind Asia ~", and won three Japan Private Broadcasting Association Awards. At the turn of the century, Nagoya TV signed cooperation agreements with foreign TV stations such as Dalian TV, Ho Chi Minh City Television, Suzhou Radio and Television and Arirang TV to strengthen overseas cooperation.

The current brand, Mētele (メーテレ Mētere, derived from the first character in the name Nagoya (名, on reading "めい" mei)), and hybrid sheep-wolf mascot (Wolfy) were introduced on March 31, 2003. The design concept of Wolfy is "a wolf in sheep's clothing", which means that although it is a sheep now, it is shedding its skin and becoming a wolf TV. The name "Wolfy" was selected from more than 15,000 submissions During the 2005 Aichi International Expo, Nagoya TV not only broadcast a series of special programs, but also co-organized a concert with the Expo Association on May 28. In 2007, on the occasion of its 45th anniversary, Nagoya TV's average daily ratings reached 8.9%, ranking second among Nagoya private TV stations for the first time in 15 years. In the same year, Nagoya TV also ranked second with an average prime-time viewership rating of 13.1%.

In 2009 and 2010, due to the 2008 financial crisis, Nagoya TV suffered losses for two consecutive years. In 2011, Nagoya TV turned losses into profits. On July 24 of the same year, Nagoya TV stopped broadcasting analog TV signals and fully entered the digital TV era. In 2012, on the occasion of the 50th anniversary of its launch, Nagoya TV launched the promotional slogan "Sheep and Wolf are both Mētele" (Sheepも. Wolf も. メ～テレ) and produced many special programs. This year, Nagoya TV's prime-time ratings reached 13.4% and evening-time ratings reached 13.5%, winning the double crown in ratings. In 2013, Nagoya TV won the double crown in ratings.

Nagoya TV is also very keen on contributing to local causes. The year after the broadcast, Nagoya TV donated 1,000 street trees to the Nagoya City Hall. Since then, Nagoya TV has continued tree planting activities for a long time. By 1984, Nagoya TV had planted more than 30,000 trees in Nagoya City, and also held tree planting activities in Ise City, Yokkaichi City, Toyohashi City and other places. On October 9, 1969, Nagoya TV donated the large fountain located on the south side of the Nagoya TV Tower to the Nagoya City Hall and named it the "Fountain of Hope." The fountain cost 70 million yen to build and has a diameter of 20 meters. In 1972, as part of the commemoration of the 10th anniversary of the broadcast, Nagoya TV donated and planted more than 1,100 cherry blossoms in Heihe Park, and named the area where cherry blossoms were planted "Sakura Garden".

On July 21, 2020, NBN became the first commercial television station in Japan to operate a satellite rebroadcast vehicle with 4K capabilities.

On October 2, 2023, the station entered the Locipo web platform, which was initiated by other stations in Nagoya in 2020. Out of the five stations broadcasting from Nagoya, NBN refused to participate at launch.

== Studios ==
When Nagoya TV started broadcasting, it was located in the Clock Building (Clock Tower) at 5-11 Minami Otsudori, Naka- ku, Nagoya City. However, since the main control room of Nagoya TV is located in the Nagoya TV Tower, the headquarters and main control room are separated in two places, which brings great inconvenience to the business. In addition, the studio space is small, so Nagoya TV decided to invest 1 billion yen in 1964. Build your own headquarters building. On May 8, 1964, the Nagoya TV headquarters building started construction and was completed in September of the following year. The first generation headquarters of Nagoya TV had 4 floors above ground and 1 floor underground, with a total floor area of approximately 2,300 square meters. There are two studios in the headquarters building. The large studio has an area of 500 square meters and the small studio has an area of 165 square meters. On October 3, 1965, Nagoya Television officially began broadcasting television signals from the headquarters building. In 2011, the old headquarters of Nagoya TV was demolished.

In 1998, in order to adapt to the needs of the digital television era, Nagoya TV began planning to build a new headquarters. On September 26, 2001, a groundbreaking ceremony was held for the new headquarters of Nagoya TV. After a year and a half of construction, the new Nagoya TV headquarters was completed on April 25, 2003. The new headquarters of Nagoya TV has 8 floors above ground and 1 floor underground, with a total floor area of 20,811 square meters. There are a total of 6 studios in the building, of which the largest studio B has an area of 410 square meters, and studio A also has an area of 320 square meters. The news studio is located on the 4th floor and can be combined with the news department in case of emergency news. On July 1 of the same year, Nagoya TV began broadcasting signals from its new headquarters.

== Real estate business ==
Nagoya TV is also actively involved in real estate. In 1978, Nagoya Television built the NBN Izumi Building in Sakae. The building has eight floors above ground and two floors underground, with a total floor area of 7,258 square meters. The project cost 1.15 billion yen. It is occupied by Nagoya TV and affiliated companies, Toyota Sales and other companies. On November 2 of the same year, the Central Park Underground Mall operated by a company affiliated with Nagoya TV opened for business. On the opening day, about 20,000 people visited. On November 1, 1986, Central Park Annex (セントラルパーク・アネックス), a clothing department store invested by Nagoya Television, opened.

== Programs ==
=== Overview ===
In the early days of broadcasting, Nagoya TV produced mainly news and sports broadcasts. Rikidozan's last game of his career in 1963 was produced and broadcast by Nagoya TV. Nagoya TV was also the first TV station in the Tokai region to broadcast the assassination of John F. Kennedy. In 1968, Nagoya TV broadcast exclusive news about the attack on Nagoya Station, the first vice president of the Soviet Union. In the same year, Nagoya TV also broadcast a special program on the Hida River bus crash accident, establishing a reporting system for major incidents. In 1986, Nagoya TV launched a large-scale news program Nagoya TV News Just 6 (Nagoya TV News Just 6) in the evening to strengthen the news program. In 1994, Nagoya TV began broadcasting a special program at 21:48 that night after the China Airlines Flight 140 crash. In 1998, Nagoya TV produced and broadcast its first large-scale evening information program Information Live To You! In 2005, Nagoya TV renamed its evening information program UP!, a longevity program that continues to be broadcast to this day. In addition to UP!, another large-scale strip information program on Nagoya TV is How is it! (ドデスカ! ), which is broadcast from 6 a.m. to 8 a.m. from Monday to Friday. It is also the only one in Tokai. The morning local information program set a record for the highest ratings since its launch in 2018.

In 1986, Nagoya TV sent a correspondent to ANN's Washington bureau, becoming Nagoya TV's first overseas correspondent. In 1991, Nagoya TV's coverage of the August 19 coup won the ANN Monthly Award in August of that year. In 1992, Nagoya TV opened its first overseas branch, ANN Singapore Branch. After the branch was closed in 2004, Nagoya TV still sent a reporter to the ANN Bangkok branch.

In 1966, Nagoya TV began to broadcast the first live broadcast program produced by the company, Madam, 30 Minutes with You. This program was also Japan's first housewife-oriented information program produced by a local station. In the same year, Nagoya TV also produced the first TV series, 100 Scenes of Couples. After switching to a network in 1973, Nagoya TV had to strengthen its program production capabilities because NET TV's program production capabilities were weaker than those of the core bureau at that time. After switching to the network, Nagoya TV produced a daily children's program, Bunbunbanban, that was broadcast nationwide. In 1977, Nagoya TV's 15th anniversary TV series Holding Hands (お手々つないで) was broadcast in prime time nationwide through the ANN network. It was the first TV series broadcast by Nagoya TV in prime time. In 1978, Nagoya TV also produced the first live daily information program, Look Here! (こっちむいてホイ!). To commemorate the 35th anniversary of its founding, Nagoya TV began broadcasting the Late Night Express series, starring Osawa Takao and Matsushima Nanako, in 1996.

As early as 1969, the animated program Six Laws of Crime (六法やぶれクン) produced by Nagoya TV was broadcast nationwide in Japan. Invincible Super Man Zambot 3 broadcast from 1977 to 1978 created Nagoya TV's dominant position in the field of robot-themed animation. In 1979, Mobile Suit Gundam co-produced by Nagoya TV, Sotsu, and Nippon Sunrise achieved unprecedented success and became a milestone work in the history of Japanese animation. In July 2009, Nagoya TV held the 30th anniversary festival of Gundam, attracting more than 70,000 people to participate.
