= Invincible Super Man Zambot 3 =

Japanese anime television series

- 無敵超人ザンボット3
- Genre: Mecha
- Creators: Yoshitake Suzuki; Yoshiyuki Tomino
- Director: Yoshiyuki Tomino (chief)
- Character designer: Yoshikazu Yasuhiko
- Mechanical designer: Ryoji Fujiwara
- Music: Takeo Watanabe
- Opening themes: Yuke! Zambot 3 by Koichiro Hori
- Ending themes: Uchu no Hoshi yo Eien ni by Koichiro Hori
- Country of origin: Japan
- Original language: Japanese
- No. of episodes: 23

Production
- Producers: Yoshikazu Tochihira (Nippon Sunrise); Nobuyuki Okuma (Sotsu Agency)
- Production companies: Nagoya TV; Sotsu Agency; Nippon Sunrise
- Runtime: 25 minutes

Original release
- Networks: ANN (Nagoya TV, TV Asahi)
- Release: 8 October 1977 – 25 March 1978

Invincible Super Man Zambot 3 (無敵超人ザンボット3, Muteki Chōjin Zanbotto Surī) is a super robot anime series created by Yoshiyuki Tomino and Yoshitake Suzuki, featuring character design by Yoshikazu Yasuhiko. It was produced by Sunrise and was first broadcast on Japanese TV in 1977. The series lasted for 23 episodes.

== Plot ==
The series focuses on the survivors of the planet Beal, which was wiped out by a mysterious entity known as Gaizok. The few remaining survivors escaped to Earth and lived as normal people for centuries, collectively called the Jin family. While attempting to start a new life, the Jin family prepared for a Gaizok invasion of Earth by building three vehicles which, when combined, form the super robot Zambot 3, piloted by Kappei Jin, Uchūta Kamie, and Keiko Kamikata.

While defending against Gaizok attacks commanded by Killer the Butcher, the Jin family also faces harsh criticism from the people they protect, who blame them for causing the invasion.

== Production ==
Zambot 3 was the first program that ran on Nagoya TV's anime block. It was also the first in-house production of Nippon Sunrise.

== Video game adaptations ==
Zambot 3 appears in several of the Super Robot Wars video-games, including Super Robot Wars V.

== Reception ==
Otaku USA wrote: "Zambot 3 was the first of a new breed of Super Robot anime in 1977 and a hell of an emotional and action packed rollercoaster. If you ever get the chance to watch this show, take the time and do it! This isn't just another anime with a Tomino Ending; it's an underrated classic."
