= Ike! Greenman =

Japanese television series

An evil version of Minilla battles the Toho superhero Greenman.

Go! Greenman (行け! グリーンマン, Ike! Greenman) is a Kyodai Hero kaiju tokusatsu television series produced by Toho in 1973. It ran from November 12, 1973, to September 27, 1974, broadcast as a segment in Nippon TV's children's program Ohayo! Kodomo Show, and consisted of 52 weekly episodes, with each episode divided into 3 segments aired over 3 days (156 segments in total). It emerged as a follow-up series to Ike! Godman, but the two share no continuity. Compared to the anthology-like storylines of Ike! Godman, Go! Greenman has a single overarching plot.

== Synopsis ==
Deep beneath Japan, a demonic orange, fang-faced creature with glowing red eyes called Maoh awakes in Hell and plots his escape after being imprisoned there by God. But in order to do this, he has to obtain the blood of human children and summons his cowardly purple jellyfish-like female servant Tonchiki to assist him. Through her, he uses beak-faced, pointy-headed clay doll phantom warriors called Maoh-no Teshita ("Minions of Maoh") that can be transformed into hideous kaiju to complete his task. A set of four special minions, dubbed the 'Kaijin', appeared towards the end of the series, each bearing unique abilities and fighting without the requirement to transform.

However, his plans are quickly foiled after the mighty robot Greenman, a self-described "envoy of God" who can grow to giant size and fire missiles from his chest, descends from space to do battle against Maoh's pawns. After his first battle on Earth, he gives the kids two devices called 'Green Calls' which can be used to summon him whenever the children are in danger.

== Returning Monsters ==
Famously, and in line with the previous Ike! Godman, numerous monsters from Toho's library of Kaiju made appearances in the series.

- 04. Gaira from The War of the Gargantuas.
- 14. Gabara from All Monsters Attack.
- 31. Sanda from The War of the Gargantuas.
- 38. King Kong from King Kong Escapes.
  - Due to copyright reasons the character was simply called "Gorilla". It was the same suit from the film, but looked slightly different due to repairs having been made to it for the show.
- 46. An evil version of Minilla, the son of Godzilla.

== Other monsters ==
These are the monsters from the various episodes. The show lasted 52 episodes (each one broken into three parts).

- 01. Garamedon
- 02. Antguirus
- 03. Gegil
- 05. Bullpull
- 06. Tsunozillas
- 07. Stock
- 08. Valingar
- 09. Megahertz
- 10. Dragonda
- 11. Totsaurus
- 12. Danbaraki
- 13. King Takoras
- 15. Gyaron
- 16. Mohtles
- 17. Bulguerilla
- 18. Alien Dorok
- 19. Spider
- 20. Foxaus
- 21. Blanca
- 22. Ibo Killer
- 23. Gowarakadon
- 24. Jairock
- 25. Dankett
- 26. Seguro No. 1
- 27. Inbelun
- 28. Lorbabla
- 29. Giringa
- 30. Red Rock
- 32. Sibiregon
- 33. Zarizon
- 34. Flasher (red and blue)
- 35. Stegodzillas
- 36. Alien Tiborus
- 37. Yasugon
- 39. Spider II
- 40. Shilarji
- 41. Akumon
- 42. Kappalge
- 43. Kupad
- 44. Hotter
- 45. Cross Dressing Kaijin
- 47. Fonshugaron
- 48. Ninja Kaijin
- 49. Magic Kaijin
- 50. Tonchiki
- 51. Pattern Kaijin
- 52. Maoh the Devil King (a.k.a. "The Devil")

-Note: The henchmen are known as Maoh-no Teshita (Devil's Underlings).

== Costumes ==
- Like in Ike! Godman, Gabara's suit was green instead of blue.
- Sanda had a new head and wig, and can spray out a mist which makes people sleepy.
- Gaira, like Sanda, also had a new head and wig.
- The Gargantuas' suits in this show were in very poor condition. Not only did the suits look like they were rotting (despite a new paint job), but tears could clearly be seen in the legs.
- The Minilla suit in this show was brand new (but looks very cheaply built) and was not an actual suit from any of the Godzilla films.
- The Flasher kaiju (from episode 34) had previously been seen in the show Assault! Human!!. Since Nippon TV co-produced that show, and co-produced this show with Toho, they were able to use the Flasher costumes. Red Rock, Shibiregon, Zarizon, Spider, Giringa, Gejiru, Stalk, Megahertz, Danbarki, Gyraron and Garmeddeon also appeared on Assault! Human!!.

== Theme songs ==
The various theme songs that appear in this show are:

- "Green-Man"
  - Sung by: ‘Call Unizone’
  - Lyrics by: Fuji Konosuke
  - Music by: Yamashita Takeo
  - Arrangement by: ‘Bob’ Sakuma

-Note: This is the song that plays during the show's opening.

- "Green-Man March"
  - Sung by: Nakatsu Tomoyoshi & Green Peace
  - Lyrics by: Fuji Konosuke
  - Music by: Setitguchi Tokichi
  - Arrangement by: ‘Bob’ Sakuma
- "Green-Man No Chosenjou" ("Green-Man’s Challenge")
  - Sung by: Nakatsu Tomoyoshi & Green Peace
  - Lyrics by: Fuji Konosuke
  - Music by: Yamashita Takeo
  - Arrangement by: ‘Bob’ Sakuma
