= Ike! Godman =

Television series

Gorosaurus battling the Toho superhero Godman.

Go! Godman (行け！ゴッドマン, Ike Godoman) is a Japanese tokusatsu Kyodai Hero kaiju television series by Toho. It ran from October 5, 1972, to April 10, 1973. It was pulled from reruns on September 28, 1973, and it was replaced by Ike! Greenman.

While on air Monday through Saturday, with only one or two episodes per week, each episode consisted of six (or three) parts and each part was five minutes long. The entire series ran for twenty-six episodes.

On every Monday (or Thursday), the Kaiju for the particular set of episodes would appear, with the plot for the set advancing through each successive day of the week, with the battle ending on Saturday with Godman being victorious. Each set follows a similar structure, with people calling for Godman's aid and the hero coming to assist them.

Aya Hirano, as Konata Izumi from the anime Lucky Star, sang this show's theme song on the Lucky Star music compilation CD.

== List of monsters ==
The following is a list of the monsters from the series:

=== Returning monsters ===
Famously, numerous previous monsters from Toho's library of Kaiju made appearances in the series.

- 2. Gabara from All Monsters Attack
- 6. Gorosaurus from King Kong Escapes
- 10. Kamoebas from Space Amoeba
- 16. Sanda from The War of the Gargantuas
- 17. Gaira from The War of the Gargantuas
- 20. Bat People from Latitude Zero

=== Other monsters ===
- 1. Kinger
- 3. Gosthon
- 4. Yasugon and Tsunokeler
- 5. Tsunosilver
- 7. Madalan
- 8. Gattlar
- 9. Momongolar
- 10. Folgon
- 11. Volpes
- 12. Imgoras
- 13. Bullman
- 14. Dongolar
- 15. Skeleton Man No.1 and No.2
- 18. Trunker and Hotter
- 19. Green Mask and Hundler
- 20. Kappalge
- 21. Alien Tiborus and Osutotam
- 22. Tsunozillas and Elephanter
- 23. Totosaurus and Shilarji
- 24. Wolfar and Gejilba
- 25. Torilorn and Ibogiller
- 26. Stegodzillas and Akumon

=== Movie monster changes ===
The Toho movie monsters that appear in this series are not related to their theatrical counterparts in terms of continuity. The suits were changed since their appearances in the original movies.

- Gabara, the Gargantuas, Tieborasu, Tsunzaurasu, Totosaurus, Akumon, and Tsurazuu later appeared in Ike! Greenman.
- Gabara's suit was green instead of blue. He was also green in Ike! Greenman.
- Some of the Toho suits were in really bad shape. The Gargantuas' suits appeared to be rotting (especially Gaira), despite the fact that both suits were repainted. They were also wearing new masks (with wigs).
- The Gorosaurus suit was in such poor shape that the inner support seemed to be deteriorating. It made Gorosaurus' torso look like it was caving in.
- Kamoebas had a flatter head and darker color.

== Theme songs ==
These are the theme songs from the show:

- Ike! Godman (Go Forth! Godman)
  - Sung by: Yamamoto Ichiro
  - Lyrics by: Fuji Konosuke
  - Music by: Yamashita Takeo
  - Arrangement by: Hirose Masakazu

-Note: "Ichiro Yamamoto" is another professional name of Ichirou Mizuki. This song plays during the show's opening.

- Bokura No Godman (Everyone's Godman)
  - Sung by: Yamamoto Ichiro & ‘Green Peace’
  - Lyrics by: Fuji Konosuke
  - Music by: Yamashita Takeo
  - Arrangement by: Hirose Masakazu
