= SFX Giant Legend: Line =

- Also known as: Line the Barbarian
- Genre: Tokusatsu; Kyodai Hero; Kaijū; Sci-Fi
- Created by: Yutaka Arai
- Screenplay by: Lee Seiryū; Ryō Namiki; Yasuyoshi Kurushima
- Story by: Yutaka Arai
- Directed by: Yutaka Arai
- Starring: Yutaka Arai
- Composer: Yoshinori Hirono
- Country of origin: Japan
- Original language: Japanese
- No. of episodes: 13 (Note: Originally 6 episodes + 1 crossover special)

Production
- Producer: Yutaka Arai
- Running time: 20–30 minutes
- Production companies: Rapid Progress; Dream Make (Note: 1989 pilot episodes "Burning Heart" and "Survivor".)

Original release
- Release: 1989 – 1996
- Release: April 25 – May 26, 2003

Line the Barbarian (SFX巨人伝説ライン, Esūefekkusu Kyojin Densetsu Rain; lit. "SFX Giant Legend: Line") is a direct-to-video independent tokusatsu series produced between 1987 and 2003 by veteran director/producer Yutaka Arai, with a total of 13 episodes, some of them being repeatedly altered over time. The series is about Line, a giant alien superhero similar in appearance to Ultraman, the only difference is that Line is silver and blue (as opposed to silver and red), and has a streamlined costume with musculature and a sharper alien-like face. Like Ultraman and his kin, Line fights assorted rampaging giant monsters. The series features guest appearances by Hurricane Ryu, (Note: Appears in the original 2 episodes "Burning Heart" and "Survivor") Yukijirō Hotaru (Note: Appears in episode 13, "Conflict of the Giant Gods!") and Eiichi Kikuchi.

To commemorate the 20th anniversary of the series in 2010, a digitally remastered edition was released on 3 DVDs, which is presented in widescreen, color corrected and provides additional scenes.

The series was also dubbed and released on VCD in Thailand. In Japan, the series was reissued on DVD on March 25, 2019. The reissues are presented in a single-length movie format rather than a show with individual episodes.

== Episode list ==
Original episodes:

1. "Burning Heart" (1989) (Note: Produced by DREAM MAKE in 1987, released on VHS as "SFX Legend Line Vol.1" by ARSA in 1989.) (Note: Currently out of print. No longer considered part of the series canon)
2. "Survivor" (1989) (Note: Produced by DREAM MAKE in 1988, released on VHS as "SFX Legend Line Vol.1" by ARSA in 1989.)
3. "Self Control" (1990) (Note: Released on VHS as "SFX Legend Line Vol.2" by Rapid Progress in 1990.)
4. "Stranger" (1991) (Note: Released on VHS as "SFX Legend Line Vol.3" by Rapid Progress in 1991.)
5. "Soldier" (1993) (Note: Produced in 1992, released on VHS as "SFX Legend Line Vol.4" by Rapid Progress in 1993.)
6. "Savior" (1996) (Note: Broadcast as part of the "Amateur Visual Shock G" program on Yokohama Cable TV.)
7. "Line vs. Aqua" (1991) – Crossover special

2003 version:

1. "Self Control" (Note: Re-edited version of original "Self Control" (#3).)
2. "The Monster Searchline" (Note: Re-edited version of "Stranger" (#4).)
3. "The SAM Attack Cease Command" (Note: Re-edited version of "Soldier" (#5).)
4. "Decisive Battle MM21" (Note: Re-edited version of "Savior" (#6).)
5. "The Seaside Capital Defense Directive"
6. "Stand By Me"
7. "The Great Monster Fierce Battle!!!"
8. "The Woman That Came from the Cold Country"
9. "The Star-Mark Shell"
10. "The Illusionary All-Out War" (Part 1) (Note: On the 2010 edition, the "Illusionary All-Out War" two-part episodes were cut together.)
11. "The Illusionary All-Out War" (Part 2)
12. "Martial Law in Tokyo!"
13. "Conflict of the Giant Gods!"

== DVD release dates ==
Original sale/rental release:

- Vol. 1 (April 25, 2003, LINE-003)
- Vol. 2 (April 25, 2003, LINE-004)
- Vol. 3 (May 26, 2003, LINE-007)
- Vol. 4 (May 26, 2003, LINE-008)
- Issued by EDGE.

2010 remastered edition:

- Vol. 1 (August 14, 2010, MFVV-0021)
- Vol. 2 (August 14, 2010, MFVV-0031)
- Vol. 3 (August 14, 2010, MFVV-0041)
- Issued by Magical Face.

2019 reprint:

- Vol. 1 (May 25, 2019, RPPD-001)
- Vol. 2 (May 25, 2019, RPPD-002)
- Issued by Rapid Progress.
