= Linda Jo Miller =

American actress

Linda Miller
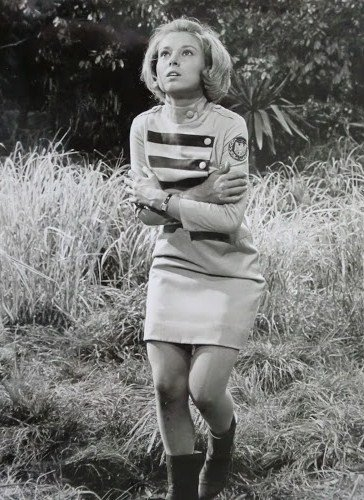
- Miller in 1967
- Born: December 26, 1947 (age 77); Pennsylvania, U.S.
- Other names: Linda Miller; Leslie Michaels
- Occupation: Actress

Linda Jo Miller, credited as Linda Miller (リンダ・ミラー) and also known as Leslie Michaels (born December 26, 1947) is an American actress known for King Kong Escapes (1967), The Green Slime (1968) and the TV series Seven Faces of Man.

== Career ==
Miller lived in Japan as a teenager and young adult, during which time she starred in Japanese productions, most notably King Kong Escapes. She returned with her family to the United States after 1968. In the U.S., she briefly pursued an acting career under the name Leslie Michaels, as Linda Miller was already taken by a Screen Actors Guild member, appearing in My Three Sons in a guest role.

For many years, her identity was a mystery among King Kong fans. She was "rediscovered" in 2014 and has since appeared in the G-Fan magazine and in conventions.

== Personal life ==
As of 2014. Miller resided in Powhatan, Virginia.

== Filmography ==
=== Film ===
Year	Title	Role	Notes
1967	King Kong Escapes	Lieutenant Susan Watson	
1968	The Green Slime	Nurse	
TBA	The New Norm	Linda	

=== Television ===
Year	Title	Role	Notes
1967	Seven Faces of Man (七つの顔の男)		Episode: "The Longest Day in Tokyo" (東京で一番長い日)
1969	My Three Sons	Louise	Episode: "The Other Woman"
