= Megaloman =

Japanese television series

Megaloman (メガロマン, Megaroman) is the name and titular superhero of a tokusatsu SF/superhero/kaiju/Kyodai Hero TV series. Created by Tetsu Kariya, the show was produced by Toho Company Ltd., and aired on Fuji TV from May 7 to December 24, 1979, with a total of 31 half-hour episodes. Starting with Episode 14, the show's title became Flaming Superman Megaloman (炎の超人メガロマン - Honô no Chôjin Megaroman).

== Plot synopsis ==
The planet Rosetta has been taken over by the Black Star army led by Captain Dagger. Takashi Shishido and his mother Rosemary escape to Earth after his father Gou is captured by Dagger, who is actually Takashi's evil twin brother Hiroshi. While living peacefully on Earth, Takashi attends a kung-fu school in Japan, and has four friends, but they have no idea that he is from another planet, a secret only his martial arts teacher Takamine knows. But when Captain Dagger initiates an attack on Earth using his army of giant monsters, Rosemary (who also goes by the civilian name "Mari") gives Takashi the Megalon-Bracelets with which he can transform into the giant long-haired warrior Megaloman to fight the evil monsters for the protection of Earth. Takashi's four martial arts school friends Seiji Kurogawa (a tough, Bruce Lee-like fighter), Hyosuke Yuri (the comedy relief), Ran Takamine (Master Takamine's daughter and Takashi's girlfriend) and Ippei Saru (the little kid) discover his secret and Rosemary gives them their own Megalon-Bracelets to enable them to transform into a quartet of multicolored superheroes to fight alongside Takashi.

== Staff ==
- Original Story: Tetsu Kariya
- Planning: Kimio Ikeda
- Producers: Kiichi Shitamura, Yoichi Manoda, Yoshio Yamamoto
- Music: Seiji Yokoyama (Conductor: Hiroshi Kumagai), Shozo Tozuka (theme songs)
  - Theme song singer: Ichirou Mizuki
- Lighting: Kunio Kishida
- Photography: Kazumasa Nomura, Yoshihiro Mori
- Art Director: Akihiko Takahashi
- Martial Arts Choreography: Junji Yamaoka (Japan Action Club)
- Special Effects: Koichi Kawakita, Yoichi Manoda

== Cast ==
- Takashi Shishido/Megaloman/Captain Dagger: Yuki Kitazume
- Ran Takamine: Madoka Sugi
- Hyousuke Yuri: Pepe Hozumi
- Seiji Kurogawa: Jimmy Araki
- Ippei Mashira: Koji Hashimichi
- Rosemary/Mari Shishido: Yukiko Takabayashi
- Sougen Takamine Takao Inoue
- Berlock: Susumu Kurobe

== Episodes ==
1. The Fiery Superman Strikes
2. The Bracelets of Friendship
3. The Shout of the Space Team
4. Appearance of the Magnetic Monster
5. The Star of Mt Hoshimigoka
6. Order: Operation Invasion
7. Fighting the Warrior of Love
8. On Guard, Small Hero
9. A UFO and a Dead Soldier in the Sea
10. Combat in the Crime Army
11. Battle For Command
12. The Great Challenge
13. The Battle of the Monsters
14. The Earth's Children are Threatened
15. Inner Conflict
16. The Mask of Gold
17. Where is the Secret Base?
18. Proof Positive
19. The Secret of the Scales
20. The Great Invasion of Monsters
21. The Heroism of Mary
22. The Secret of the Megalo-Fire
23. Infernal Prisoner
24. Blood Urge
25. The Death of Seiji
26. The Monster Zagno Zvider
27. A Providential Aide
28. The Sacrifice of Hyme
29. Takeshi - Don't Shoot the Monster!
30. Dagger's Counterattack
31. The Ultimate Challenge
