= King Kong Escapes =

1967 film directed by Ishirō Honda

- Theatrical release poster

Japanese name
- Kanji: キングコングの逆襲
Transcriptions
- Revised Hepburn: Kingu Kongu no Gyakushū
- Directed by: Ishirō Honda
- Written by: Takeshi Kimura
- Story by: Arthur Rankin Jr.
- Produced by: Tomoyuki Tanaka; Arthur Rankin Jr.
- Starring: Rhodes Reason; Linda Miller; Mie Hama; Akira Takarada
- Cinematography: Hajime Koizumi
- Edited by: Ryohei Fujii
- Music by: Akira Ifukube
- Production companies: Toho; Rankin/Bass
- Distributed by: Toho (Japan); Universal Pictures (United States)
- Release dates: July 22, 1967 (Japan); June 19, 1968 (United States)
- Running time: 104 minutes (Japan); 96 minutes (United States)
- Countries: Japan; United States
- Languages: English; Japanese
- Box office: $1 million (US/Canada rentals); 1 million tickets (France)

King Kong Escapes (Japanese: キングコングの逆襲, Hepburn: Kingu Kongu no Gyakushū; lit. 'King Kong's Counterattack') is a 1967 kaiju film directed by Ishirō Honda, with special effects by Eiji Tsuburaya. The film is a Japanese–American co-production between Toho and Rankin/Bass, and stars Rhodes Reason, Linda Miller, Akira Takarada, Mie Hama, Eisei Amamoto, with Haruo Nakajima as King Kong and Hiroshi Sekita as Mechani-Kong and Gorosaurus. The film is loosely based on Toei Animation's and Rankin/Bass' anime series The King Kong Show, and is the second and final Toho-produced film featuring King Kong, until its collaboration with Warner Bros. Pictures and Legendary Pictures on Godzilla vs. Kong (2021).

King Kong Escapes, the fourth entry of the King Kong franchise, was released in Japan by Toho on July 22, 1967, and released in the United States by Universal Pictures on June 19, 1968, as Universal's second King Kong film. 37 years later, it was followed by the second remake of the 1933 film as the third and final King Kong film by Universal on December 14, 2005.

== Plot ==
An evil mad scientist named Dr. Who creates Mechani-Kong, a mecha modeled after the legendary Mondo Island giant ape named Kong, to dig for Element X, the highly radioactive mineral found only at the North Pole. As Mechani-Kong enters an ice cave and begins to dig into a glacier, the Element X radiation destroys its brain circuits, causing Mechani-Kong to shut down. Who then sets his sights on getting the real Kong to finish the job. Who is taken to task by a female overseer, Madame Piranha, whose country's government is financing Who's schemes, and frequently berates him for his failure to get results.

Meanwhile, a submarine commanded by Carl Nelson arrives at Mondo Island, where Kong lives. Kong gets into an intense fight with a giant dinosaur named Gorosaurus and a sea serpent. He falls in love with lieutenant Susan Watson, while Who subsequently goes to Mondo Island to abduct Kong and brings him back to his base at North Pole. Kong is hypnotized by a flashing light device and fitted with a radio earpiece. Who commands Kong to retrieve Element X from the cave. Due to the problems with the earpiece ensue, Who kidnaps Watson, who is the only person who can control Kong.

After Watson and her fellow officers are captured by Who, Piranha unsuccessfully tries to seduce Nelson to bring him over to her side. Eventually, Kong escapes and swims all the way to Japan where he battles Mechani-Kong in Tokyo. As two monsters face off at the Tokyo Tower, Kong prevails and destroys Mechani-Kong and kills Who and his henchmen. In the end, Kong triumphantly swims back to Mondo Island.

== Cast ==
- Rhodes Reason as Commander Carl Nelson. He is based on Carl Bond from The King Kong Show.
  - Kei Taguchi voices Carl in Japanese version
- Akira Takarada as Lt. Commander Jiro Nomura
- Linda Jo Miller as Lt. Susan Watson. She is based on Susan Bond from The King Kong Show.
  - Akiko Santou voices Susan in Japanese version
  - Julie Bennett redubs the voice of Susan in later American version.
- Hideyo Amamoto as Dr. Who, the mad scientist and one of the main antagonists of the film. He is based on the character of the same name from The King Kong Show.
  - Paul Frees voices Who in American version
- Mie Hama as Madame Piranha
  - Bennett also voices Piranha in American version
- Yoshifumi Tajima as Chief
- Nadao Kirino as Dr. Who's assistant
- Shoichi Hirose, Toru Ibuki, Nadao Kirino, Susumu Kurobe, Sachio Sakai, Kazuo Suzuki, Yoshifumi Tajima as Dr. Who's henchmen
- Andrew Hughes as United Nations journalist
- Ryūji Kita as Police inspector
- Masaaki Tachibana as JSDF soldier
- Ikio Sawamura as Mondo Islander
- Yasuhisa Tsutsumi as General
- Osman Yusuf as Submariner
- Haruo Nakajima as King Kong, the legendary giant ape who lives in Mondo Island and one of the main protagonists of the film. He was previously portrayed by Shoichi Hirose in King Kong vs. Godzilla.
- Hiroshi Sekita as Mechani-Kong, the ape-based Mecha built by Who and one of the main antagonists of the film
  - Sekita also portays Gorosaurus, the dinosaur who lives in Mondo Island

== Production ==
The story is partly a remake of the animated TV series (itself a retelling of the original 1933 film) about a tamed Kong who is befriended by a boy and directed to fight for the forces of good. That concept (minus the boy) is combined with a mad scientist story with elements from the then-popular spy film genre. The sinister Dr. Who is patterned after James Bond villains Dr. Julius No and Ernst Stavro Blofeld. His partner, Madame Piranha, is an Asian spy played by Mie Hama, fresh from the Bond film You Only Live Twice (1967). Submarine commander Carl Nelson is similar to Admiral Nelson, commander of the submarine Seaview in Voyage to the Bottom of the Sea, a series that also featured giant monsters and stories about international espionage.

According to an interview with Reason about the making of this film, Paul Frees did almost all the male voices for the dubbed version, save for Carl Nelson, where Reason returned to dub the character's voice. Frees apparently asked Reason why he was there and said as a joke: "Why are you here? I could probably do a better version of you than you could."

In the English version, Julie Bennett dubbed all the female voices, including that of Linda Miller. While Miller loved the Japanese voice, she hated her dubbed voice in the American version. She was extremely mad at Arthur Rankin Jr., the producer, for not inviting her to dub her own lines when Rhodes Reason (Nelson) was able to re-dub his. It turned out to work this way because Reason was a part of the Screen Actors Guild, and Linda Miller was only a model, and still residing in Japan at the time (transportation costs to New York would have been prohibitive).

The shot of Gorosaurus living on Monster Island seen in the 1969 film All Monsters Attack was actually stock footage taken from this film.

=== Special effects ===
- Eiji Tsuburaya - Special effects director
- Sadamasa Arikawa - Secondary special effects director
- Teruyoshi Nakano - Assistant special effects director
- Takeo Kita - Art direction
- Fumio Nakadai - Wireworks director
- Yasuyuki Inoue - Special effects sets

== Release ==
=== Theatrical ===
Japanese theatrical release poster for the 1973 re-release of the film

Toho re-released the film in 1973 as part of the Champion Matsuri (東宝チャンピオンまつり), a film festival that ran from 1969 through 1978 and featured numerous films packaged together and aimed at children. In 1983, the film was screened during the Godzilla Resurrection Festival.

Outside Japan and the U.S., the film received a wide release in most international markets, where it went by different titles. The film was released in West Germany as King-Kong, Frankensteins Sohn (King Kong: Frankenstein's Son), in Belgium as La Revanche de King Kong (The Revenge of King Kong) - a direct translation of the Japanese title, in Italy as King Kong il gigante della foresta (King Kong, the Giant of the Forest), in Turkey as Canavarlarin Gazabi (Wrath of the Monsters), in Mexico as El Regreso de King Kong (The Return of King Kong), in Finland as King Kong kauhun saarella (King Kong on the Island of Terror), and in Sweden as King Kong på skräckens ö (King Kong on Terror Island)

=== Home media ===
The film has been released twice on DVD. The first time as a double feature two-pack (separate keep cases) with King Kong vs. Godzilla on November 29, 2005 and again on April 1, 2014.

== Reception ==
=== Box office ===
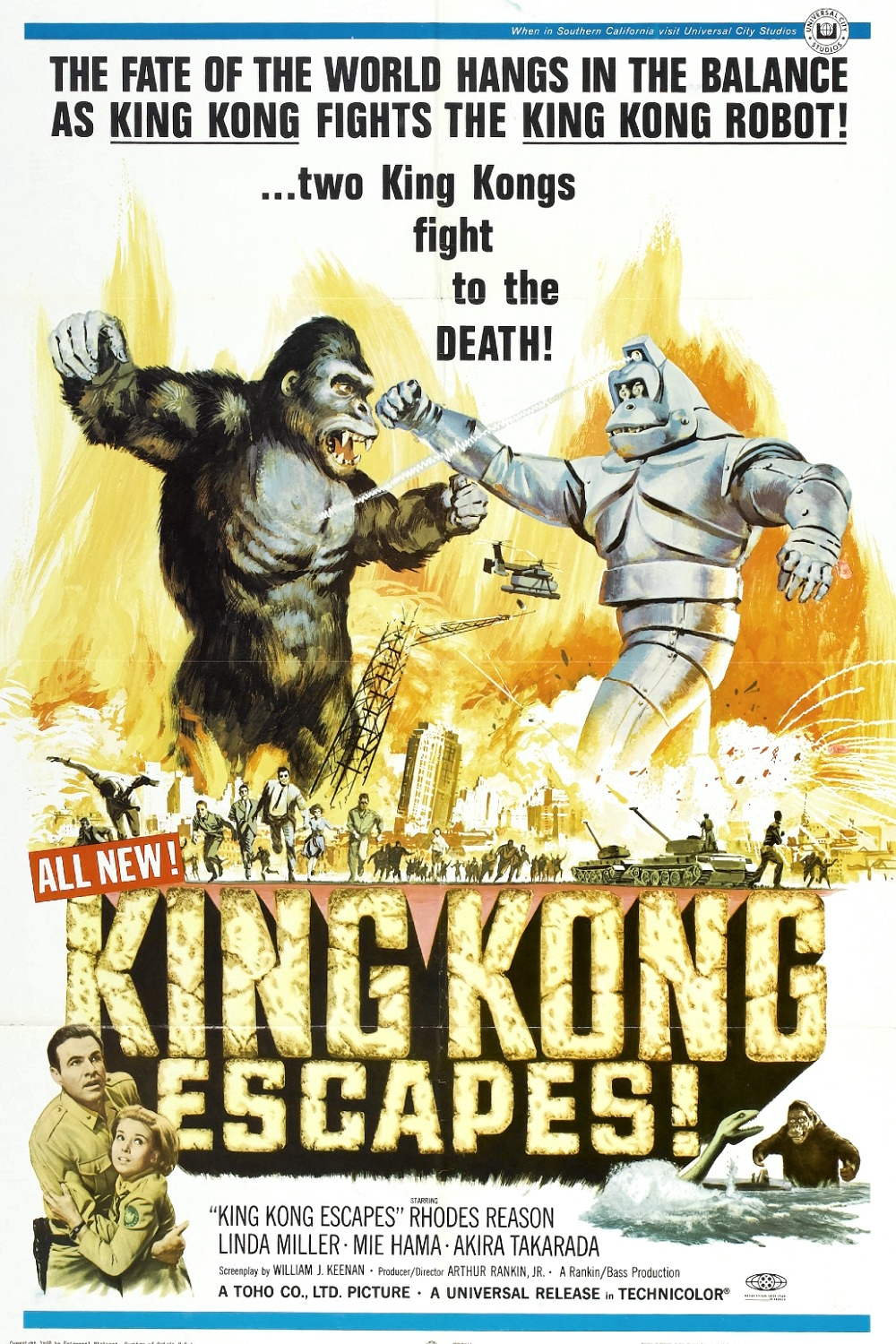
American theatrical release poster

The film opened in the United States in June 1968 as a double feature with the Don Knotts comedy/Western film The Shakiest Gun in the West (itself a remake of the 1948 Bob Hope comedy/Western film The Paleface). The film earned American and Canadian theatrical rentals of $1 million, equivalent to estimated box office gross receipts of approximately $3 million. In France, the film sold 1,014,593 tickets.

=== Critical response ===
Contemporary American reviews were mixed. New York Times film critic Vincent Canby gave it a negative review, commenting, "The Japanese ... are all thumbs when it comes to making monster movies like 'King Kong Escapes.' The Toho moviemakers are quite good in building miniature sets, but much of the process photography—matching the miniatures with the full-scale shots—is just bad ... the plotting is hopelessly primitive ..."

The July 15, 1968, issue of Film Bulletin, however, gave it a more positive review, saying, "Grown-ups who like their entertainments on a comic-strip level will find this good fun and the Universal release (made in Japan) has plenty of ballyhoo angles to draw the school-free youngsters in large numbers."

On Rotten Tomatoes, an approval rating of 63% based on 8 reviews, with an average rating of 5.1/10.

=== Legacy ===
"Gorilla" battles the Toho superhero Greenman from an episode of the 1973 series Go! Greenman. "Gorilla" was portrayed by the King Kong suit from this film.

Toho wanted to use King Kong again after this film. King Kong was included in an early draft for the 1968 film Destroy All Monsters but was ultimately dropped due to the fact that Toho's license on the character was set to expire. Toho managed to get some use out of the suit, though. The suit was reused to play the character "Gorilla" in episode #38 of the Toho giant superhero show Go! Greenman. The three-part episode, titled "Greenman vs. Gorilla", aired from March 21, 1974, through March 23, 1974.

Toho would bring the character Gorosaurus into the Godzilla series in Destroy All Monsters, using the same suit from this film. The suit was reused again four years later (at this point in a dilapidated condition) to portray the character in episode #6 of the Toho giant superhero show Go! Godman. The six-part episode, titled "Godman vs. Gorosaurus", aired from November 9, 1972, through November 15, 1972.

In the early 1990s when plans for a King Kong vs. Godzilla remake, titled Godzilla vs. King Kong, fell through, Toho had planned to bring back Mechani-Kong as an opponent for Godzilla in the project Godzilla vs. Mechani-Kong. However, according to Koichi Kawakita, it was discovered that obtaining permission to use even the likeness of King Kong would be difficult. Kawakita stated:

Toho wanted to pit Godzilla against King Kong because King Kong vs. Godzilla was very successful. However, the studio thought that obtaining permission to use King Kong would be difficult. So, it instead decided to use MechaniKong. Soon afterward, it was discovered that obtaining permission even to use the likeness of King Kong would be difficult. So, the project was canceled. MechaniKong was going to have injectors. A number of people were going to be injected into Godzilla while the robot was wrestling with him. They then were going to do battle with Godzilla from within while MechaniKong continued to do battle with him from without. There were going to be many different strange worlds inside Godzilla. The concept was very much like the one on which Fantastic Voyage was based.

However, a rebuilt Mechani-Kong does appear in the Kodansha manga Godzilla, King of the Monsters (as the events of King Kong Escapes are canonical to the manga's continuity) by Dr. Mad Oniyama to help Mechagodzilla fight Godzilla, only to be destroyed by the Monster King in battle.
