= GAEA-TIMA the Gigantis =

Japanese manga series

- First tankōbon volume cover

大怪獣ゲァーチマ (Dai Kaijū Geāchima)
- Genre: Action; Drama; Science fiction
- Manga
- Written by: KENT
- Published by: Kodansha
- English publisher: NA: Kodansha USA
- Imprint: Young Magazine KC
- Magazine: Monthly Young Magazine
- Original run: June 20, 2023 – present
- Volumes: 10
- Anime

GAEA-TIMA the Gigantis (Japanese: 大怪獣ゲァーチマ, Hepburn: Dai Kaijū Geāchima) is a Japanese manga series written and illustrated by KENT. It began serialization in Kodansha's seinen manga magazine Monthly Young Magazine in June 2023. An anime adaptation has been announced.

== Plot ==
One day, a monster called GAEA-TIMA appears from the sea and attacks the port city of Konan, which devastates the town. However, the monster dissolves into the sea, providing nutrients to catch fish. Yako Morinomiya creates a souvenir to commemorate the event, which becomes popular among tourists. However, ten years later, the monster reappears and the townsfolk have to determine if he is a friend or a foe and if there are others like him.

== Media ==
=== Manga ===
Written and illustrated by KENT, GAEA-TIMA the Gigantis began serialization in Kodansha's seinen manga magazine Monthly Young Magazine on June 20, 2023. Its chapters have been compiled into ten tankōbon volumes as of November 2026.

During their panel at San Diego Comic-Con 2024, Kodansha USA announced that they had licensed the series for English publication.

No.	Original release date	Original ISBN	North American release date	North American ISBN
1	November 20, 2023	978-4-06-533056-2	April 29, 2025	979-8-88877-436-6
1. "The Day Gaea-Tima Came"; 2. "The Day Gaea-Tima Disappeared"; 3. "Gaea-Tima in Vinyl"; 4. "Welcome to FUNE"
2	March 18, 2024	978-4-06-535000-3	July 29, 2025	979-8-88877-437-3
5. "Fight, Gaea-Tima!"; 6. "Marine Combat"; 7. "A Secret Meeting in the Guest Room"; 8. "A Stolen Gaea-Tima Figurine"
3	July 19, 2024	978-4-06-536292-1	September 30, 2025	979-8-88877-515-8
9. "Naive and Ignorant"; 10. "Go for Broke"; 11. "Gaea-Tima vs. the Subterranean Kaiju"; 12. "Funerals and Carnivals"
4	November 20, 2024	978-4-06-537598-3	November 25, 2025	979-8-88877-567-7
13. "Wind on Water"; 14. "A Shadow Over the Sky"; 15. "The Kaiju Charmer"; 16. "The Gaea-Tima Intensive"
5	March 18, 2025	978-4-06-538930-0	January 27, 2026	979-8-88877-657-5
17. "I-Wanna-You-Wanna Connection"; 18. "Showdown! Gaea-Tima Versus Tsubagra"; 19. "Interstellar Overdrive"; 20. "Kaiju Under Control"
6	July 18, 2025	978-4-06-540469-0	June 23, 2026	979-8-88877-808-1
21. "There's No Place Like Home"; 22. "Sink or Swim"; 23. "Tsubagra Joins the Fight"; 24. "Who's the Trickster?"
7	November 20, 2025	978-4-06-541458-3	February 2, 2027	979-8-88877-977-4
8	March 18, 2026	978-4-06-542921-1	—	—
9	July 17, 2026	978-4-06-544274-6	—	—
10	November 19, 2026	978-4-06-545661-3	—	—

=== Anime ===
An anime adaptation was announced on November 17, 2025.

== Reception ==
The first volume featured a recommendation from tokusatsu filmmaker Shinji Higuchi.

The series was included in the American Library Association's 2025 Best Graphic Novels for Adults.
