= Giant Phantom Monster Agon =

- Japanese DVD release
- Also known as: Agon 幻の大怪獣アゴン; Maboroshi no Daikaijū Agon; Agon: Atomic Dragon
- Genre: Kaiju
- Created by: Shinichi Sekizawa
- Developed by: Akira Ajiyoshi
- Written by: Shinichi Sekizawa; Kôzô Uchida (Eps 3 & 4)
- Directed by: Norio Mine (Eps 1 & 2); Fuminori Ohashi (Eps 3 & 4)
- Starring: Shinji Hirota; Asao Matsumoto; Nobuhiko ShimaShima; Akemi Sawa; Shin'ya Irie
- Composer: Wataru Saitô
- Country of origin: Japan
- Original language: Japanese
- No. of episodes: 4

Production
- Executive producer: Jou Shiragami
- Producer: Goh Hiroshi
- Running time: 24 minutes (TV episodes); 96 minutes (film version)
- Production company: Nippon Denpa Eiga

Original release
- Network: Fuji TV
- Release: January 2 – January 8, 1968

Giant Phantom Monster Agon (幻の大怪獣アゴン, Maboroshi no Daikaijū Agon) is a 1964 black-and-white Japanese Kaiju miniseries. Produced by Nippon Television, the miniseries aired on Fuji TV from January 2, 1968, to January 8, 1968. Internationally, the film is known as Agon: Atomic Dragon. The series was re-released in a condensed feature-length film in the mid-1990s by Toho.

== Plot ==
Episode #1 A powerful storm is raging in the dead of night, and a transport vehicle carrying uranium is forced to stop due to a landslide blocking off the road on the mountain pass they were traveling on. As the driver tried to contact the transport's headquarters, a second landslide from the heavy rain comes crashing down onto the vehicle, sending it over the edge of a cliff and into the sea below.

The storm is the result of an intense typhoon striking Japan, leaving hundreds dead and several hundreds more without homes. Reports from the survivors begin to pour in to the City News Division, leaving every reporter on staff manning the phones to take down any new information regarding the storm. One reporter, Goro Ryouji, nicknamed the "Suppon", arrives late, much to the anger of his boss, but he reveals that he's following up on the transport vehicle's crash. He also lets his boss know that the news division's competitors don't know about this yet, so Goro has an exclusive scoop at the time.

The next day, the National Atomic Energy Center and the police have begun to investigate the area near where the vehicle went off the edge. Detective Yamato arrives to ask Dr. Ukyo if there have been any readings of radioactivity, to which the doctor nods and wonders if the vehicle was completely washed to sea. Goro soon arrives, revealing his information on both Yamato and Ukyo before revealing that he knows about the special uranium that it was containing, Uran X. As the three talk, they begin to hear strange roaring noises near the mountainside, which one of the police officers refers to as the "Tengu's Great Trumpet Shell", a large cave that funnels air in such a way to produce the sound.

Goro rushes into the cave to explore it, only to run back out in a panic exclaiming that something has appeared. A strange light appears from the tunnel, which Goro says was a one-eyed monster, but as the four look on in fear, the light goes out, and a young boy with a flashlight, Monta, comes out of the cave. Yamato asks where Monta found the flashlight, and after some coaxing, it is revealed that it was from the transport vehicle and that he found it amongst the rocks.

Goro and the others suddenly begin to hear a loud noise behind them, likewise noticing that one of the Geiger counters pointed out towards the ocean is reading levels off the scale. As they look out towards the ocean, a large, reptilian creature slowly breaches the surface.

The next day, news of the creature begins sweeping the news, and Goro and Yamato, on their way to the Atomic Research Center to see Dr. Ukyo, begin to wonder why the monster has decided to appear now. As they're making their way towards the center, they are forced to stop when a dog sitting on the road refuses to move out of the way. Goro tries to coax the dog off to the side when a young woman appears and tells Goro that the dog won't let them pass because it has the common sense to know that smoking isn't allowed at the center. Once Goro puts out his cigarette, the dog walks off to the side of the road, and Yamato, joking that Goro lost, drives on, leaving the reporter to chase after him on foot.

Dr. Ukyo arrives and begins to tell him that he has information regarding Agon, the name he has given to the monster. He reveals that it is a mutated dinosaur from the Jurassic period. Believing it to have been dormant under the ocean, Ukyo suggests that the mutation is a result of nuclear bomb tests in the Pacific. The woman from the road, Satsuki Shizukawa, appears, and Dr. Ukyo reveals that she is his research assistant. Just then, she receives a phone call reporting that the center's uranium storage checking meter is showing an abnormality.

With no issues with the uranium fuel, Goro, Yamato, Dr. Ukyo, Satsuki, and several other scientists make their way towards the beach and begin to pick up high radioactive readings. Dr. Ukyo sends Satsuki to return to the center to alert the authorities, but as Agon appears and begins to tear through the forest, Satsuki falls and her leg gets pinned under a tree. As Goro and the others reach the Research Center to begin to evacuate the facility, he realizes that Satsuki hasn't arrived. Satsuki tries desperately to pull her leg free from under the tree, but as Agon approaches, the weight of the creature opens up a large fissure in the ground, and the ground underneath her gives way, causing the scientist to fall down into it.

Episode #2 Goro and Yamato rush back to try to find Satsuki, who was knocked unconscious from the fall into the chasm. Goro reaches her first and, with Yamato's help, manages to climb back out with her over his shoulder. As Satsuki regains consciousness, the three look on as Agon reaches the Research Center and begins to destroy it, easily demolishing any building in its path.

The three quickly climb down towards the road and meet up with Dr. Ukyo as the facility is being evacuated. From their safe vantage point, they stop and watch as Agon strikes and cracks open the nuclear reactor of the Research Center, and Goro and Yamato are convinced that the radiation spilling out from it would be enough to kill the monster. Dr. Ukyo though feels that it's too early to tell, and that they shouldn't jump to conclusions so soon.

Several days later, Goro goes and visits Satsuki at the hospital she's in while recovering from her injuries. He tells her that, while it's not certain, it seems that Agon was killed in the explosion of the nuclear reactor, though she's not convinced that it won't appear again. Goro's boss calls him at the hospital and berates him for slacking off rather than pursuing more information on Agon's attack, informing him that Dr. Ukyo had an important announcement that he was going to make later that day.

Dr. Ukyo reveals that he believes that, due to the monster's "birth" from radioactivity, the explosion of the reactor did little more than feed it, and that as long as uranium exists, Agon will continue to try and obtain it. A plan is devised by the military to take advantage of Agon's behavior, luring the monster out from the sea with uranium fuel in order to attack it. The wait for the creature is not long, as Agon quickly surfaces and makes for the fuel.

A squadron of jet fighters make the first attempt to intercept, bombarding the monster while it is still at sea, but their missiles have little effect on it. Agon retaliates with blasts of atomic fire from its mouth, downing several of the jets in the process. Tank and cannon fire from the shore quickly followed, but like the jet fighters, their attacks weren't able to deter Agon as it continued towards land.

Dr. Ukyo suggests that they all head toward the shore to further examine Agon's behavior, arriving just as the monster strikes down a lighthouse overlooking the ocean. Yamato jumps into the transport vehicle containing the uranium fuel and lets it coast into the sea, jumping out before it careens off the edge. Agon, quickly plucking the wagon from the water, turns back towards the sea. Goro asks if everything is settled now with the monster, but Dr. Ukyo is convinced that Agon will return, and that they must find some means of a countermeasure before it does.

Episode #3 During a torrential rainstorm out at sea, two brothers are hanging on desperately in their rowboat as it suddenly capsizes from the waves. The two make their way to a small home and ask the owner if they can stay there for the night to brave the storm. The owner lets them in and suggests that they should change into dry clothes, then goes to find them some from a dresser. As the two begin to undress, a gun drops from the waist of one of them, who quickly hides it in a basket. As the home owner invites them to sit for tea, one of the brothers asks him if he knows of any good divers, to which he replies that he is one. The two tell him that they'll talk more about what they'd like him to fetch from the ocean tomorrow.

The next day, the three make their way out to where they want him to dive, informing him that it's a suitcase that he is looking for. As he makes his way down towards the suitcase, he sees Agon resting near it, and immediately swims back towards the surface. He tells the two that he saw a monster that he is certain was Agon, and that the suitcase was right at its foot. As he tells them that he must go to inform his neighbors, the elder brother insists that he keep things quiet until he salvages their suitcase once Agon leaves, and threatens him with his gun that he do what they ask.

Goro and Satsuki are out fishing when Monta arrives and tells them that it's a terrible place to fish, and goes home to get his fishing rod. When there, he finds his father and the two brothers; the younger one taking him hostage so that his father doesn't try to escape or alert the police.

The three go out to the salvage area again, but with Agon still resting in the area, Monta's father is unable to retrieve the suitcase. The two brothers decide that moving Agon would be the only way to salvage the suitcase, and the elder brother suggests using uranium to lure him away, stealing some from the Fuel Laboratory.

That night, the two of them make their way into the laboratory, incapacitating a guard and taking his keys before stealing a uranium fuel rod. The next morning, Yamato and Goro arrive at the laboratory. Monta's father arrives soon after, telling them that he has information related to the robbery and that the two have his son hostage. He reveals that they took the fuel because Agon was in the area, and Dr. Ukyo quickly reports the monster's location to the military.

Monta's father manages to retrieve the suitcase and brings it back to the brothers, who are convinced that he was lying to them about Agon and plan to keep Monta as a hostage until they escape. Monta's father tries to fight them off, and Goro, having seen him making his way back to shore, arrives to help. As the elder brother pulls his gun on Goro, Yamato quickly appears and disarms him.

During the struggle, Monta was set adrift in his father's boat, and it begins floating towards Agon, who has surfaced having sensed the uranium. The military begin shelling Agon as it surfaces, but their attacks are unable to injure it. The monster takes the boat and Monta in its mouth, forcing the shelling to cease. The two brothers, realizing the suitcase is in the boat, decide that they'll need to follow Agon and force it to let the ship go, as the monster, still firmly clutching the boat in its jaws, begins to make its way onto the beach.

The Final Episode Agon begins to make its way into the village as the military is still unable to attack it with Monta in its mouth. With the Self Defense Force unable to attack the monster and unable to devise a way of saving the boy, Goro suggests that they use a helicopter to fly near Agon and drop down into the boat from a rope ladder to save Monta. Being his idea, Goro nominates himself to be one of the rescuers, but he is rebuked by the commanding officer, saying that it's too risky for an untrained individual. However, the plan will be implemented all the same.

Soon, the helicopter approaches Agon, which remains unusually motionless as the rescue crew make their way down to the boat still held within its mouth. Suddenly, the monster swats at the rope ladder and pulls the helicopter down to the ground, destroying it before moving off from the top of the mountain it was sitting on. Agon began to make its way towards Mie City.

Goro is racked with guilt over having suggested the helicopter plan, not only because it resulted in the death of the crew, but also because it enraged Agon, endangering Monta and the city as a result. Satsuki manages to comfort him, telling him that the military chose to follow with his idea because it was the best they had available, and that they need to come up with another plan so that the crew's deaths weren't in vain.

Dr. Ukyo and Yamato decide that, in order to save Mie City, they will lure Agon away using a helicopter with a large quantity of uranium suspended underneath it. Given the distance that the helicopter will need to travel, it is uncertain if it will be able to reach the monster before it reaches the city.

Agon begins to slowly make its way through a steel manufacturing plant, but before it reaches the furnaces, the helicopter manages to arrive and begins to circle it. The monster quickly turns toward the uranium being suspended overhead and begins to follow the helicopter as it is led away from the plant and back towards the ocean. Agon leans down and drops the boat from its mouth as it begins to pursue after its food, freeing Monta from its grasp. Goro and the others quickly rush to him and find him unconscious, but otherwise uninjured.

The two brothers watch as the military find their suitcase, and they decide to make their way towards Agon in order to retrieve it. When it's opened, Goro and the others find that the suitcase is filled with narcotics, likely smuggled from an off-shore ship, and Goro suggests that they give it to Agon. Dr. Ukyo comments that it'd be interesting to see what that effects that narcotics of that quantity would do to the monster, and that it'd likely kill him.

The plan is made to have the narcotics added to the uranium container, and the helicopter lands to make the addition. As it lands, the brothers arrive and, after knocking out a police officer, commandeer the helicopter from Goro and its pilot before taking off again. The two begin to fly in low and taunt Agon, only to be blasted by a stream of its atomic fire before eating them and the narcotics. The drugs quickly take effect, and Agon begins to stagger aimlessly through the steel manufacturing factory, catching itself on fire as it destroys the plant's furnaces. Goro, Yamato, and the others watch on as Agon slowly makes its way back into the ocean, its fate uncertain.

== Production ==
Filming of Giant Phantom Monster Agon was completed in 1964, but Toho Studios, complaining Agon too closely resembled Godzilla, prevented it from being broadcast at that time. It later came to light that Shinichi Sekizawa (writer of several of Toho's kaiju films) and Fuminori Ohashi (apprentice of Eiji Tsuburaya, Toho's head of special effects) were involved with the project. Convinced the two men were not intentionally copying Godzilla, Toho allowed the series to be broadcast in 1968.

Agon was filmed in black & white, but with a sepiatone tint, giving it an unusual look. Also of note is the unique musical score composed by Wataru Saitô. Toho would again become involved with Agon when they re-edited the four TV episodes into a feature-length movie for a VHS release in the mid-1990s.

The Agon monster suit, with some modifications, was later reused in the tokusatsu series The Space Giants, first as a generic dinosaur, later as Giant Fire Monster Aron.
