= Sotsu =

Japanese advertising agency

Sotsu Co., Ltd.
- Logo used since 2007

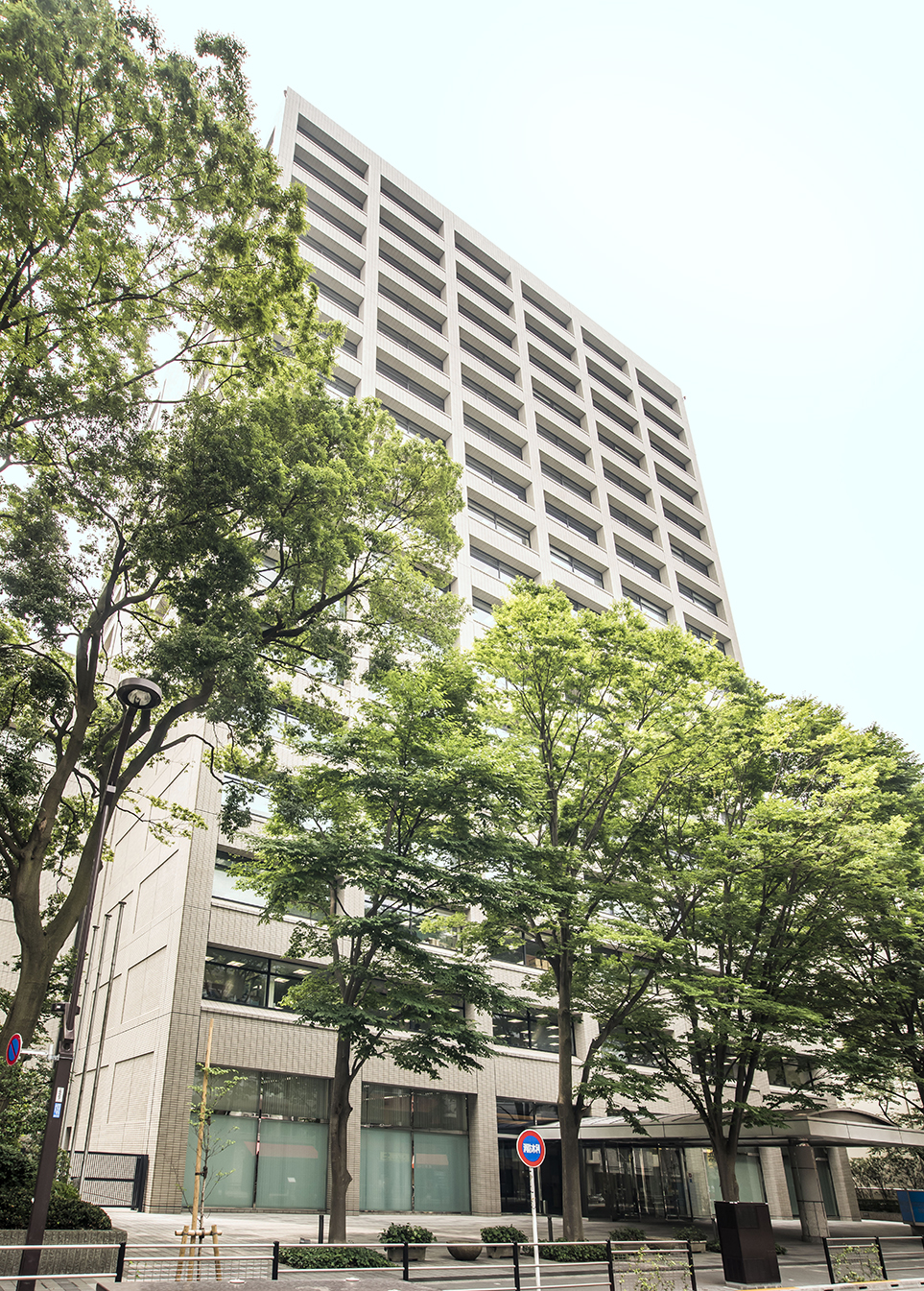
- Headquarters in Suginami, Tokyo
- Native name: 株式会社創通
- Romanized name: Kabushiki gaisha Sōtsū
- Formerly: Toyo Agency Co., Ltd. (1965–1977); Sotsu Agency Co., Ltd. (1977–2007)
- Type: Subsidiary
- Industry: Advertising
- Predecessor: Sotsu Entertainment
- Founded: October 1, 1965; 61 years ago
- Headquarters: Ogikubo, Suginami, Tokyo, Japan
- Key people: Hideyuki Nanba (president)
- Revenue: ¥414.750 million (2019)
- Parent: Bandai Namco Holdings (2020–2022); Bandai Namco Filmworks (2022–present)
- Subsidiaries: J-Broad; Sotsu Shangai
- Website: www.sotsu.co.jp

Sotsu Co., Ltd. (Note: Japanese: 株式会社創通, Hepburn: Kabushiki-gaisha Sōtsū; stylized in all caps) is a Japanese advertising agency and, since March 2020, a subsidiary of Bandai Namco Holdings, and later, Bandai Namco Filmworks.

== History ==
It was founded in 1965 as Toyo Agency (東洋エージェンシー, Tōyō Ējenshī), with it being designated by baseball team Yomiuri Giants as its primary agency for the planning and distribution of the team's merchandising interests. In 1977, it changed its name to Sotsu Agency (創通エージェンシー, Sōtsū Ējenshī). The agency was first listed in the JASDAQ stock exchange in 2003. On April 1, 2007, the company changed its name to Sotsu (創通, Sōtsū).

In 1972, it began been involved in the production and licensing of numerous television programs, starting with Thunder Mask. The first anime series it produced was Sunrise's Invincible Super Man Zambot 3, after which the company produced numerous others. In 1979, it produced Mobile Suit Gundam.

In October 2019, Bandai Namco Holdings announced plans to acquire Sotsu, a move which would grant the company full rights to the entire Gundam franchise. The next month, however, Chicago, Illinois-based investment firm RMB Capital forced Bandai Namco to raise the tender offer price for Sotsu in a follow-on tender offer targeted at the general shareholders of Sotsu. On March 1, 2020, Sotsu finally became a fully owned subsidiary of Bandai Namco.

On October 7, 2025, it was announced that the company would streamline its planning, production and copyright management businesses as well as management of the Gundam series, that are currently overlapped within BNF and its subsidiary, Sotsu. As part of this, Sotsu would transfer its Gundam series-related businesses and its IP planning and production businesses to BNF with the transfer being completed on April 1, 2026.

== Productions ==
=== Sunrise productions ===
- Aura Battler Dunbine
- Combat Mecha Xabungle
- Gundam series
- Haou Taikei Ryū Knight
- Heavy Metal L-Gaim
- Invincible Steel Man Daitarn 3
- Invincible Super Man Zambot 3
- Wild Knights Gulkeeva
- Metal Armor Dragonar
- Outlaw Star
- Saikyō Robo Daiōja
- Shippu! Iron Leaguer
- Trider G7

=== Nippon TV programs ===
- Sore Ike! Anpanman
- Thunder Mask

=== TV Asahi/ABC programs ===
- Burst Angel
- Gankutsuou: The Count of Monte Cristo
- Glass no Kantai
- SoltyRei
- Speed Grapher

=== TV Tokyo programs ===
- Battle Hawk (as Toyo Agency)
- Cardfight!! Vanguard (formerly aired on TV Aichi for the first season)
- Capeta
- Dai-Guard
- E's Otherwise
- Earth Girl Arjuna
- Eat-Man (1997 anime)
- Eden's Bowy
- Elemental Gelade
- Glass no Kamen
- Grander Musashi RV
- Hare+Guu
- Hyper Police
- Kinkyū Hasshin Saver Kids
- Legend of Heavenly Sphere Shurato
- Doki Doki Densetsu Mahōjin Guru Guru
- Master of Mosquiton ('99)
- Papuwa
- Saber Marionette J
- Kyatto Ninden Teyandee
- School Rumble
- Shadow Skill
- Shiawa Sesō no Okojo-san
- Shura no Toki
- Silent Mobius
- Simoun
- Sorcerer Hunters
- Spiral: Suiri no Kizuna
- Tekkaman Blade
- Shin Tenchi Muyo!
- Those Who Hunt Elves
- Virus Buster Serge
- YuruYuri

=== UHF programs ===
- Higurashi no Naku Koro Ni
- Play Ball
- Shōnen Onmyōji
