= Thunder Mask =

- Title card
- Genre: Superhero; Kyodai Hero
- Created by: Tezuka Osamu
- Developed by: Shozo Uehara
- Directed by: Ishirō Honda
- Starring: Kazuichi Sekihara
- Country of origin: Japan
- No. of episodes: 26

Production
- Running time: 24 minutes (per episode)

Original release
- Network: Nippon Television
- Release: October 3, 1972 – March 27, 1973

Thunder Mask (サンダーマスク Sandā Masuku) is a 1972 tokusatsu series produced by Hiromi Productions and Sotsu Agency for Nippon Television. An adaptation by Osamu Tezuka was serialized in Shogakukan's Weekly Shōnen Sunday from 1972 to 1973.

== Plot ==
Thunder Stars Commonwealth, who knew the ambition of Earth invasion of the Dark Space Deakanda, dispatched a warrior to the earth to prevent it. However, he mistakenly arrived at the earth 10,000 years ago, so he slept with a time capsule after leaving behind the old document that a monster appeared after 10,000 years and the key to wake up to sleep. And after 10,000 years, the Thunder Mask woke up from sleep at the end of the efforts to sacrifice the lives of the three doctors of Japan called the three biggest brains of Japan against the raids of the Deakanda, appearing at Koichi youth scientist Change, and cooperate with the science patrol squad to throw themselves into the fight with the demonic monsters.

== Episodes ==
1. Behold! Akatsuki's Two Step Makeover
2. A boy who puts out devils
3. The spirit of the fire
4. Demon frozen operation
5. Vampire half-fish people's revenge
6. Tokyo desert Hakaider
7. Suck on Earth's oil
8. Eat Jumbo Jet!!
9. Put a hole in the earth!
10. Dorotrono! Bones in humans
11. It's ambush for the devils
12. Cruel! Thunder mask capital punishment
13. At the end of the far away galaxy
14. Breaking down demon animals
15. It is a steam whistle of death Degon H
16. A reviving descender
17. Radio Demon Delegation
18. The Devil Battery Electric Strikes Back
19. Thunder mask insanity
20. Immortal beasts Gataviran
21. Go for it in the ashes of death!
22. It is dangerous! Your toy is a monster!
23. Ghost story! Vampire and fog night
24. Save the frozen panties!
25. Great reversal! Ironman No. 13
26. Farewell, the brave brilliant star
