= Wasei Kingu Kongu =

Wasei Kingu Kongu 和製キング・コング
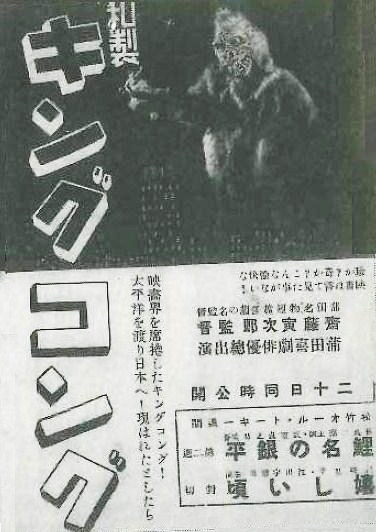
- 1933 promotional flyer
- Directed by: Torajiro Saito
- Written by: Akira Fushimi
- Starring: Yasuko Koizumi; Takeshi Sakamoto; Kotaro Sekiguchi; Nagamasa Yamada; Isamu Yamaguchi
- Cinematography: Yoshio Taketomi
- Production company: Shochiku
- Distributed by: Shochiku
- Release date: October 5, 1933
- Running time: 30 minutes
- Country: Japan
- Languages: Silent film Japanese intertitles

Wasei Kingu Kongu (和製キング・コング; lit. Japanese-made King Kong) is a lost 1933 Japanese black-and-white silent film directed by Torajiro Saito. A silent, three-reel comedy short, it uses the 1933 film King Kong as a backdrop to the story and was produced by Shochiku Studios (which released the original 1933 film in Japan on behalf of RKO). It is now considered a lost film.

== Plot ==
Santa and his friend Koichi are jobless vagabonds. They make their living by picking up coins on the streets. Santa has a girlfriend named Omitsu, but her father Seizo does not like having his daughter date a penniless man. He breaks the lovers up and tries to marry his daughter off to a rich man. Desperate, Santa seeks employment and wanders the streets. He cannot find a job at all, but has an inspiration. RKO's King Kong has been released and is a big hit in Tokyo. He decides to capitalize on its success by dressing up as an ape and playing King Kong in a vaudeville theater. He approaches one theater owner to tell him of the idea and the owner is pleased with Santa's plan, thus giving him the job. Santa's King Kong show becomes an instant success, with Santa interacting amongst props on the theater stage in his gorilla suit (small buildings, toy airplanes, a doll, etc.). One day while performing on stage, Santa sees that Omitsu and her new rich boyfriend are in the audience. Blinded with rage, Santa jumps down from the stage and runs after them - with his gorilla suit still on! Santa creates chaos in the town as firemen and hunters chase him, thinking him an escaped gorilla that is running wild in the streets. Eventually Santa confronts the rich boyfriend and knocks him unconscious. He puts the gorilla suit on him and leaves him lying out cold in the street. Just then, Koichi comes and tells Santa that the theater owner will give him a lot of money for his performances. Now that he has wealth, Santa marries Omitsu.

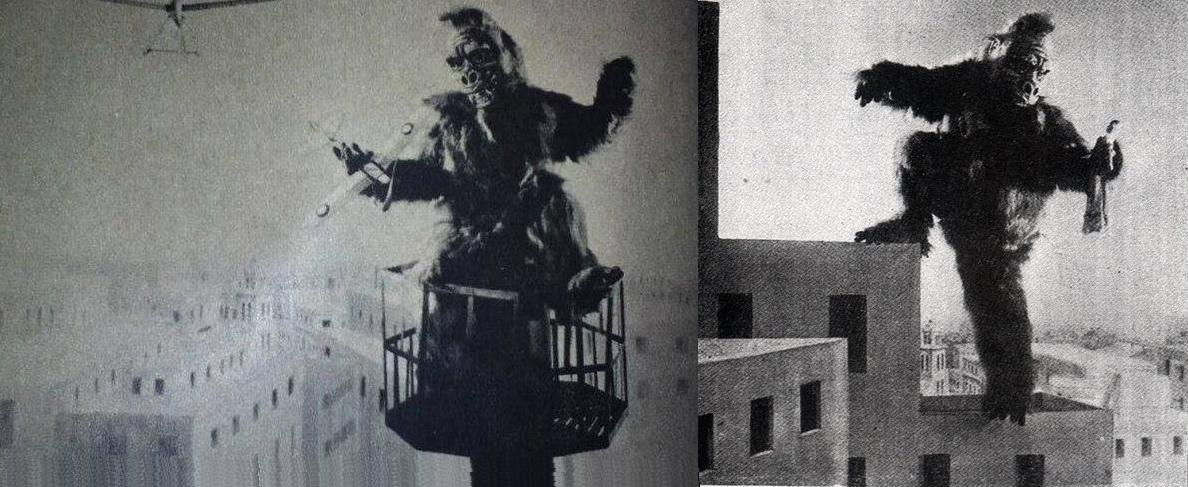
Publicity photos of Isamu Yamaguchi as King Kong for Wasei Kingu Kongu

== Cast ==
Actor	Character
Yasuko Koizumi	Omitsu
Takeshi Sakamoto	Yokoshima
Kotaro Sekiguchi	Seizo
Nagamasa Yamada	Koichi
Isamu Yamaguchi	Santa / King Kong

== Production ==
Shochiku Studios produced this Torajiro Saito comedy short. Shochiku released King Kong in Japan on behalf of RKO and wanted to fund this film as a tie-in to the film's release, which is used as a backdrop in the story. Torajiro Saito was a very popular film producer/comedian at the time, known for his successful comedy shorts. Going by the information presented by magazines and newspapers covering the film's release, it is believed that there are no actual special effects in the film, as it focuses on a man trying to earn money to woo his girlfriend by playing the King Kong character on stage.

== See also ==
- The King Kong That Appeared in Edo
- List of lost films
