= Assault! Human!! =

- Directed by: Mochi Sunuma; Fumihiko Kanbe; Osamu Shigematsu
- Starring: Kai Natsuyube
- Country of origin: Japan
- No. of episodes: 13

Production
- Running time: 24 minutes (per episode)

Original release
- Network: Nippon TV
- Release: October 7 – December 30, 1972

Assault! Human!! (突撃! ヒューマン!! Totsugeki! Hyūman!!) is a 1972 tokusatsu series produced by Mot Boule.

The series has never been rebroadcast or released on home media since its first rerun after its original run. Most Japanese sources claim that the original master reels were overwritten for another show after the re-airing, rendering the series lost. Other than that, it's respective theme does however survive which was released on LP records.

== Plot ==
King Flasher, a mysterious being, and his army of Flashers threaten the safety of the Earth, starting by targeting children. Meanwhile, Junichiro Iwaki, a once famous gymnastics coach resigns from his job to train the threatened children. In return, the children used a device known as a Human-Sign to transform Junichiro into a superhero named the Human. From then on, King Flasher began creating monsters to attack the children, but Junichiro was always there to stop them. Later on, Junichiro's brother Junjiro started becoming suspicious of his brother's frequent disappearances. This leads to Junjiro finding out about Junichiro's alter ego. At the same time, King Flasher was overthrown by another evil being called Grand Flasher who nearly killed Junichiro. But, the children spectators used a secondary type of Human-Sign to turn Junjiro into the second Human. Gradually, the Human brothers managed to destroy every last member of the Flasher Core including Grand Flasher himself, restoring peace to the world.

== Casts ==
- Yûsuke Natsu as Junichiro Iwaki (Human No.1)
- Akihiko Nishijima as Junjiro Iwaki (Human No.2)
- Yoshiko Tanaka as Rumiko Hoshiyama
- Shun Yashiro as Yasube Hirai
- Keiko Aramaki as Kyoko Hanawa
- Yoshio Sudo as Human (Vinpro)
- Ritsuo Sawa as Flashers, Red Flasher, Black Flasher
- Miki Kageyama as Queen Flasher, Pink Flasher
- Ichirō Murakoshi as King Flasher
- Vinpro as Flasher Corps
- Yasuo Yamada as Narrator

== Episodes ==
1. ヒューマンて何だ (What is Human)
2. 怪獣シビレッタ3千匹！ (Monster Shibiretta three thousand animals!)
3. 血を吸う！ 怪獣ドラゴンダ (Suck the blood! Monster Doragonda)
4. 空飛ぶ怪獣ブランカー！ (Flying monster blanker!)
5. 殺せ！！ 怪獣レッドロック (Kill!! Monster Red Rock)
6. 怪人ゲジルの死！！ (Death of Phantom Gejiru!!)
7. 怪人メガヘルツ テレビ局を爆破！！ (The blast Phantom megahertz TV station!!)
8. 魔の少年フラッシャー！！ (The magic of the boy flasher!!)
9. キングフラッシャーの最期 (Last moment of King flasher)
10. 英雄ヒューマンの最期！！ (Last moment of the hero Human!!)
11. 帰ってきたヒューマン！ (Human came back!)
12. ヒューマン兄弟大活躍！ (Human brother big success!)
13. さようならヒューマン (Goodbye Human)

== Legacy ==
Most of the kaiju from this series were later reused in Toho’s Ike! Greenman.
