= List of Japanese films of 1997 =

== Highest-grossing films ==
Rank	Title	Gross
1	Princess Mononoke	¥11.3 billion
2	The End of Evangelion	¥2.47 billion
3	Lost Paradise	¥2.30 billion

== List of films ==
A list of films released in Japan in 1997 (see 1997 in film).

Title	Director	Cast	Genre	Notes
Carranger vs. Ohranger				
Cat's Eye	Kaizo Hayashi	Yuki Uchida, Izumi Inamori, Norika Fujiwara		
Crayon Shin-chan: Pursuit of the Dark Tama Tama			Anime	
Cure	Kiyoshi Kurosawa	Kōji Yakusho, Tsuyoshi Ujiki, Anna Nakagawa	Thriller	
Detective Conan: The Time-Bombed Skyscraper				
The Eel	Shohei Imamura			Won the Palme d'Or at Cannes
The End of Evangelion	Hideaki Anno		Anime	Finale to the TV series Neon Genesis Evangelion. Won the Animage Anime Grand Prix, Japanese Academy Prize for "Best Sensation," and "Anime Choice Award" at Animation Kobe.
Neon Genesis Evangelion: Death and Rebirth	Hideaki Anno		Anime	Clip show of episodes 1-24 of the TV series Neon Genesis Evangelion, followed by 27 minutes of a draft of The End of Evangelion.
Fireworks	Takeshi Kitano			
I Thought About You	Yukio Kitazawa	Yōta Kawase	Gay Pink	Pink Grand Prix, Best Film
Magunichuudo - ashita heno kakehashi	Hiroshi Sugawara	Kumie Tanaka, Naoto Ogata, Hiroko Yakushimaru	Drama	
Moonlight Serenade	Masahiro Shinoda			Entered into the 47th Berlin International Film Festival
Parasite Eve	Masayuki Ochiai	Hiroshi Mikami, Riona Hazuki, Tomoko Nakajima	—N/a	
Perfect Blue	Satoshi Kon		Mystery, thriller	Animated film
Princess Mononoke	Hayao Miyazaki		Fantasy, adventure	Animated film
Rainy Dog	Takashi Miike	Show Aikawa	Crime	
Rebirth of Mothra II	Kunie Miyoshi	Megumi Kobayashi, Sayaka Yamaguchi, Aki Hano	Science fiction	
Rurouni Kenshin: Ishin Shishi no Requiem				
School Ghost Stories 3	Shusuke Kaneko	Naomi Nishida, Hitomi Kuroki, Hideki Noda	—N/a	
Sharan Q no enka no hanamichi	Yōjirō Takita	Tsunku, Hatake, Takanori Jinnai	Comedy	
Shoot, My Darlin	Hitoshi Ozawa	Vivian Hsu, Hitoshi Ozawa, Masahiro Yamashita	Crime	Japanese-Filipino co-production
Tekken: The Motion Picture				Animated
Tokyo Biyori	Naoto Takenaka	Naoto Takenaka, Miho Nakayama, Yakako Matsu	Comedy-drama	
Welcome Back, Mr. McDonald	Koki Mitani	Jun inoue, Yasukiyo Umeno, Kaoru Okunuki	Comedy	
Woman of the Police Protection Programme	Juzo Itami	Nobuko Miyamoto, Masahiko Nishimura, Takehiro Murata	—N/a	

== See also ==
- 1997 in Japan
- 1997 in Japanese television

== Footnotes ==
=== References ===
- Galbraith IV, Stuart (2008). The Toho Studios Story: A History and Complete Filmography. Scarecrow Press. ISBN 978-1461673743.
- Kalat, David (2007). J-horror: The Definitive Guide to The Ring, The Grudge and Beyond. Vertical. ISBN 978-1932234084.
