= Kenji Suzuki (director) =

Japanese special effects director

Kenji Suzuki (鈴木健二, Kenji Suzuki; July 9th, 1957) is a Japanese special effects director. His credits include Rebirth of Mothra III (1998), Godzilla 2000: Millennium (1999), Godzilla vs. Megaguirus (2000), Ultraman Cosmos (2001-2002), Ultraman Max (2005-2006), and Ultraman Mebius (2006-2007).

== Biography ==
Suzuki had a rather short career at Toho as a special effects director of theatrical films, which only spanned across one Mothra movie and two Godzilla films. It appears that Suzuki might have taken the blunt of the blame for Godzilla vs. Megaguirus (2000) box office failure, which is why his career might have ended so abruptly. Before Suzuki became a director of special effects, he was the assistant special effects director for The Imperial Navy (1981) as his first production. He dabbled in assisting outside of special effects, before teaming with Koichi Kawakita for Sayonara Jupiter (1984). Seven years later, Suzuki became Kawakita's go-to assistant from Godzilla vs. King Ghidorah (1991) until Kawakita's retirement from theatrical work.

In 2003, Suzuki was back at Toho, however, this time in the director's chair as he helped helm Toho's successful The Gransazers TV show. He continued this trend with the follow-up series in the Star God franchise: The Justirisers (2004).

== Filmography ==
=== Special Effects Director ===
- Rebirth of Mothra III (1998)
- Godzilla 2000: Millennium (1999)
- Godzilla vs. Megaguirus (2000)
- Ultraman Cosmos (2001-2002)
- Ultraman Max (2005-2006)
- Ultraman Mebius (2006-2007)

=== Special Effects Assistant Director ===
- The Imperial Navy (1981)
- Sayonara Jupiter (1984)
- Godzilla vs. King Ghidorah (1991)
- Godzilla vs. Mothra (1992)
- Godzilla vs. Mechagodzilla II (1993)
- Godzilla vs. SpaceGodzilla (1994)
- Yamato Takeru (1994)
- Godzilla vs. Destoroyah (1995)
- Rebirth of Mothra (1996)
- Rebirth of Mothra II (1997)

=== Director ===
- ChouSeiShin GranSazer (2003-2004)
- Genseishin Justiriser (2004-2005)
- Ultraman Mebius (2006-2007)
- Ultraseven X (2007)

=== Assistant Director ===
- Daijobu, My Friend (1983)
- Tampopo (1985)

=== Acting ===
- Godzilla Against Mechagodzilla (2002)
