= Godzilla vs. Megaguirus =

2000 Japanese kaiju film by Masaaki Tezuka

- Theatrical release poster by Noriyoshi Ohrai

Japanese name
- Katakana: ゴジラ対メガギラス
Transcriptions
- Revised Hepburn: Gojira tai Megagirasu
- Directed by: Masaaki Tezuka
- Written by: Wataru Mimura; Hiroshi Kashiwabara
- Produced by: Shogo Tomiyama
- Starring: Misato Tanaka; Shōsuke Tanihara; Yuriko Hoshi; Masatō Ibu; Toshiyuki Nagashima
- Cinematography: Masahiro Kishimoto
- Edited by: Yoshiyuki Okuhara
- Music by: Michiru Ōshima
- Production company: Toho Pictures
- Distributed by: Toho
- Release dates: November 3, 2000 (Tokyo International Film Festival); December 16, 2000 (Japan)
- Running time: 105 minutes
- Country: Japan
- Language: Japanese
- Budget: ¥700-950 million
- Box office: ¥1.2 billion

Godzilla vs. Megaguirus (ゴジラ × メガギラス G消滅作戦, Gojira tai Megagirasu: Jī Shōmetsu Sakusen; lit. Godzilla vs. Megaguirus: The G Extermination Strategy and Godzilla vs. Megaguirus: The G Annihilation Strategy) is a 2000 Japanese kaiju film directed by Masaaki Tezuka (in his directorial debut), with special effects by Kenji Suzuki. Distributed by Toho and produced under their subsidiary Toho Pictures, it is the 25th film in the Godzilla franchise and the second film in the franchise's Millennium series, as well as the 24th Godzilla film produced by Toho. The film stars Misato Tanaka, Shōsuke Tanihara, Yuriko Hoshi, Masatō Ibu, and Toshiyuki Nagashima; it also features the fictional monster characters Godzilla and Megaguirus, portrayed by Tsutomu Kitagawa and Minoru Watanabe, respectively.

Despite how the film features the same Godzilla suit that was used in its predecessor, Godzilla 2000, Godzilla vs. Megaguirus ignores the events of the previous installment, as well as every other entry in the franchise aside from the original 1954 film. Godzilla vs. Megaguirus premiered at the Tokyo International Film Festival on November 3, 2000, and was released theatrically in Japan on December 16, 2000.

The film was followed by Godzilla, Mothra and King Ghidorah: Giant Monsters All-Out Attack, set in a different continuity, which was released on December 15, 2001.

== Plot ==
In 1954, repeated nuclear testing revives the creature called Godzilla, who proceeds to decimate Tokyo in retaliation. (Note: This serves as an alternate retelling of the original 1954 self-titled film.) Afterwards, the capital of Japan is moved from Tokyo to Osaka during Tokyo's reconstruction. In 1966, Japan abandons the use of nuclear power after Godzilla attacks Tōkai Nuclear Power Plant to feed on its energy. In 1996, Japan develops a new form of "clean" plasma energy to replace nuclear energy, but Godzilla returns once more and attacks a plasma energy reactor in Osaka. As a result, plasma energy is also banned due to fears that it will continue to attract Godzilla, while the Japanese government establishes a special unit of the Japan Self-Defense Forces, known as the "G-Graspers", dedicated to combating Godzilla if he returns again.

In 2001, the G-Graspers, led by Major Kiriko Tsujimori and assisted by rebellious scientist Hajime Kudo, have developed an experimental satellite-based weapon that fires miniature black holes, codenamed Dimension Tide, in hopes of killing Godzilla. A test firing of the weapon temporarily opens a wormhole, through which a giant prehistoric dragonfly known as a Meganula briefly enters the present time and deposits an egg sac, before returning through the wormhole. A boy named Jun Hayasaka finds the Meganula's egg sac, and takes it with him when he moves to Tokyo. When the egg sac starts oozing a strange liquid, Jun dumps it in the sewer, where the egg sac splits into a mass of eggs and hatches into giant dragonfly nymphs called Meganulon. At night, a Meganulon kills a couple and molts into a new Meganula. Many more soon emerge, while their underground activity causes flooding across large areas of Tokyo.

Meanwhile, Godzilla appears again in the ocean near Japan, despite the country's bans on both nuclear and plasma energy. While Godzilla battles the G-Graspers, who manage to lure him ashore on Kikaijima Island using their advanced Griffon aircraft so Dimension Tide can target him, the swarm of Meganulon have all metamorphosed into their Meganula forms, and are attracted to Godzilla's energy. The swarm arrive on the island and attack Godzilla, but he manages to kill most of them. During the battle, the Dimension Tide is fired, but the strike misses and Godzilla survives. The surviving Meganula fly back to the flooded Shibuya, with Godzilla seemingly following them. With the last of their strength, the Meganula inject some of Godzilla's energy into the nymph form of their massive queen, Megaguirus, allowing her to molt into her adult form. After destroying part of Shibuya, Megaguirus flies to Odaiba and faces Godzilla. The two monsters engage in a lengthy battle, but Godzilla ultimately kills Megaguirus by breaking her stinger and then blasting her with his atomic breath.

It is revealed that Godzilla has been attracted to a secret plasma energy project housed at Tokyo's Science Institute, in violation of the ban. As the Dimension Tide satellite begins falling out of orbit, Tsujimori pilots the Griffon directly above Godzilla, allowing the Dimension Tide to lock on to her craft and fire just before burning up on reentry. Tsujimori ejects before the Griffon crashes into Godzilla, who fires his atomic breath at the descending black hole, but seemingly vanishes.

Later, Tsujimori again enlists Kudo to investigate unusual seismic activity, suspecting that Godzilla might have survived. In a post-credits scene, Jun hears Godzilla's roar as an earthquake strikes Tokyo.

== Cast ==
- Misato Tanaka as Kiriko Tsujimori, the captain of G-Grasper and one of the film's main protagonists.
- Shōsuke Tanihara as Hajime Kudo, the inventor and Tsujimori's teammate.
- Masanobu Katsumura as Makoto Nikura, the spokesperson of G-Grasper.
- Mansaku Ikeuchi as Kazuo Mima, the operator of G-Grasper
- Masatō Ibu (Note: Credited as Masatoh Eve) as Motohiko Sugiura, special director of Anti-G.
- Yuriko Hoshi as Yoshino Yoshizawa, the physicist of Special G Countermeasures Science Team First Laboratory. Hoshi previously portrayed Naoko Shindo from Ghidorah, the Three-Headed Monster in Showa-era Godzilla film series.
- Makiya Yamaguchi as Seiichi Hosono, the pilot of G-Grasper.
- Tetsuo Yamashita as Tomoharu Okumura, the crew member of G-Grasper.
- Toshiyuki Nagashima as Takuya Miyagawa, the captain of Anti-Godzilla Special Forces who sacrifices himself to protects Tsujimori from Godzilla.
- Katsuo Nakamura as Tsuyoshi Yamaguchi, the biologist of Special G Countermeasures Headquarters.
- Hiroyuki Suzuki as Jun Hayasaka, the boy who finds the egg sac of Meganulon.
- Kōichi Yamadera as the host of Oha Suta.
- Emi Ota as the host of Oha Suta.
- TOMO (Yuji) as young man attacked by Meganulon.
- Motoko Nagino as young woman attacked by Meganulon.
- Tsutomu Kitagawa as Godzilla, the mutant dinosaurian creature who was awakened by nuclear testing in 1954 and one of the film's main protagonists. He is the alternate reality version of the first Godzilla from original 1954 film.
- Minoru Watanabe as Megaguirus, the queen of Meganula and the film's main antagonist.

== Production ==
Shōgo Tomiyama selected Masaaki Tezuka as director after Tezuka had worked as an assistant on Godzilla vs. Mechagodzilla II and the Rebirth of Mothra trilogy. Part of what influenced the direction of the film was Tezuka's desire to make something similar to Aliens which would serve as the impetus for what would become Godzilla vs. Megaguirus. When writing for the film, Wataru Mimura tried to avoid going too dark or violent due to the film's release date being so close to New Year's and felt a lighter tone was more reflective of the release date. Tezuka spoke of his intentions with Godzilla vs. Megaguirus:

Reflecting on MEGAGUIRUS, what I wanted to do was to provide a scientific background to the story. I needed clear scientific reasons. It is impossible to create a Black Hole Gun, Godzilla himself is totally unrealistic, but I needed them for the story, therefore I thought providing scientific rationales were all the more important.

== Release ==
Godzilla vs. Megaguirus was released theatrically in Japan on December 16, 2000, where it was distributed by Toho. The film was released directly to television in the United States by Columbia TriStar with an English dub. There are some inconsistencies in the translation of the dub however, including one scene where Hajime tells Kiriko that body building is a waste of time since they'll be making Godzilla disappear "up his own butthole" rather than their artificially created "black hole" as the original version states.

=== Home media ===
The film has been released at least twice on home media. The first was by Columbia/Tristar Home Entertainment, on January 27, 2004.

The second release was by Sony on Blu-ray as part of the Toho Godzilla Collection, and was released on May 6, 2014, on 2-Disc double feature with Godzilla vs. Destoroyah.

== Reception ==
Godzilla vs. Megaguirus was released on December 16, 2000, to mixed reactions. Ed Godziszewski of Monster Zero said, "While not the best example of filmmaking, Godzilla vs. Megaguirus nonetheless succeeds as an entertaining film." Miles Imhoff of Toho Kingdom said, "Run-of-the-mill, mediocre, and sterile are the three words that best describe Godzilla vs. Megaguirus. It is a movie that attempts to be creative and edgy, but somehow fails, leaving one wanting with futility to really try to enjoy the film."

Stomp Tokyo said "the music is pretty good" but "this movie isn't a step forward in the ways that it really should be." Mike Bogue of American Kaiju said, "Though not the best of the post-Showa Godzilla movies, Godzilla vs. Megaguirus is one of the most entertaining." Ian Jane of DVD Talk said, "While not the best entry in the Godzilla series, Godzilla vs. Megaguirus ... [is] still a really solid entry with some great special effects and a very memorable monster mash finale."

Matt Paprocki of Blog Critics called the film "a true classic in the series," adding: "It's impossible not to be entertained somewhat, whether you're looking for camp value or serious giant monster action. This one has everything that is required of the [kaiju] genre." Andrew Pragasam of The Spinning Image called the film a "flawed, but entertaining comic book extravaganza" that "only partially delivers as a slam-bang monster epic" and suffers from "a lack of likeable characters."

On Rotten Tomatoes, an approved rated 60% based on 6 reviews with average rating 6.5/10.
