= Shōgo Tomiyama =

Japanese former film producer

- 富山省吾
- Born: Okinawa Prefecture, Japan
- Education: Waseda University
- Occupation: Former film producer
- Years active: 1973–2010

Shōgo Tomiyama (富山 省吾, Tomiyama Shōgo) is a Japanese former film producer. He is best known for his long tenure at Toho, where oversaw the production of the Godzilla film series during its Heisei and Millennium eras.

== Filmography ==
=== Producer ===
- Yuki no dansho - jonetsu (1985)
- Young Girls in Love (1986)
- Totto Channel (1987)
- Gorufu yoakemae (1987)
- Godzilla vs. Biollante (1989)
- Chōshōjo Reiko (1991)
- Godzilla vs. King Ghidorah (1991)
- Godzilla vs. Mothra (1992)
- Godzilla vs. Mechagodzilla II (1993)
- Yamato Takeru (1994)
- Godzilla vs. Destoroyah (1995)
- Rebirth of Mothra (1996)
- Rebirth of Mothra II (1997)
- Rebirth of Mothra III (1998)
- Godzilla 2000 (1999)
- Godzilla vs. Megaguirus (2000)
- Godzilla Against Mechagodzilla (2002)
- Godzilla: Tokyo S.O.S. (2003)
- Godzilla: Final Wars (2004)
- Love Never to End (2007)
- Hidden Fortress: The Last Princess (2008)
- The Vulture (2009)

=== Miscellaneous ===
- Submersion of Japan (1973) - Art assistant for SFX
- Zone Fighter (TV 1973) - Art assistant for SFX
- House (1977) - Publicity producer
- Kagemusha (1980) - Publicity producer
- Virus (1980) - Publicity producer
- Ohan (1984) - Production assistant
- Godzilla vs. SpaceGodzilla (1994) - Production cooperation
- Godzilla, Mothra and King Ghidorah: Giant Monsters All-Out Attack (2001) - executive producer
