= Godzilla 2000 =

1999 film directed by Takao Okawara

Godzilla 2000: Millennium
- Theatrical release poster

Japanese name
- Katakana: ゴジラ2000 ミレニアム
Transcriptions
- Revised Hepburn: Gojira Nisen: Mireniamu
- Directed by: Takao Okawara
- Written by: Hiroshi Kashiwabara; Wataru Mimura
- Produced by: Shogo Tomiyama
- Starring: Takehiro Murata; Hiroshi Abe; Naomi Nishida; Mayu Suzuki; Shirō Sano
- Cinematography: Yudai Kato
- Edited by: Yoshiyuki Okuhara
- Music by: Takayuki Hattori
- Production company: Toho Pictures
- Distributed by: Toho (Note: TriStar Pictures handled theatrical distribution in the United States)
- Release dates: November 6, 1999 (Tokyo); December 11, 1999 (Japan)
- Running time: 107 minutes
- Country: Japan
- Language: Japanese
- Budget: $10–13 million
- Box office: $28 million

Godzilla 2000: Millennium (ゴジラ2000 ミレニアム, Gojira Nisen: Mireniamu) is a 1999 Japanese kaiju film directed by Takao Okawara, with special effects by Kenji Suzuki. Distributed by Toho and produced under their subsidiary Toho Pictures, it is the 24th film in the Godzilla franchise, Toho's 23rd Godzilla film, and the first film in the franchise's Millennium era. The film stars Takehiro Murata, Hiroshi Abe, Naomi Nishida, Mayu Suzuki, and Shirō Sano, with Tsutomu Kitagawa as Godzilla and Makoto Itō as Orga. The film follows a group tracking Godzilla while an extraterrestrial UFO appears and poses a new threat to Japan.

Godzilla 2000: Millennium ignores the events of the previous installment, as well as every other entry in the franchise aside from the original 1954 film. Godzilla 2000: Millennium premiered at the Tokyo International Film Festival on November 6, 1999, and was released in Japan on December 11. TriStar Pictures later distributed it throughout North America on August 18, 2000, under the title Godzilla 2000. The film received mixed reviews from critics and grossed $28 million worldwide against an estimated $10–13 million budget, performing below expectations in Japan and the United States. A direct sequel was planned but ultimately abandoned.

The film was followed by Godzilla vs. Megaguirus, set in a different continuity, which was released on December 16, 2000.

== Plot ==
Godzilla, the giant amphibious creature, is regarded as a literal force of nature in Japan; the Godzilla Prediction Network (GPN) functions independently to study Godzilla and predict his landfalls. Meanwhile, the scientists of Crisis Control Intelligence (CCI) find a sixty-million-year-old unidentified flying object (UFO) deep in the Japan Trench. As CCI attempts to raise the UFO to study it, it takes off into the sky on its own. Godzilla arrives in a village and then battles the Japan Self Defense Forces, now equipped with powerful Full Metal Missiles, until the UFO appears, searching for genetic information that only Godzilla possesses. It fights Godzilla, driving the latter underwater, and then lands to replenish its solar power.

Yuji Shinoda, the founder of the GPN, discovers the secret to Godzilla's regenerative properties (Note: In Japanese version, it named Organizer G1, while in North American version, it named Regenerator G1), but so has the UFO. It frees itself from the JSDF's attempts to contain it, and heads for Shinjuku. After landing atop Tokyo Opera City Tower, it begins to drain all the files about Godzilla from Tokyo's master computers. As it begins to alter the oxygen content of the surrounding atmosphere, CCI attempts to destroy the UFO using explosive charges, but Shinoda, attempting to find out more about the extraterrestrials, is nearly caught in the blast. He survives, and joins his peers on a nearby rooftop, watching the UFO. Almost in response, the UFO broadcasts its message of invasion and creating a new "thousand-year kingdom" on Earth, and Shinoda reveals that the extraterrestrials are after the regenerative properties contained inside Godzilla's DNA so that they may use it to re-form their bodies.

Godzilla arrives and again battles the UFO. However, he is subdued by the UFO's assault, and the UFO absorbs some of Godzilla's DNA, which the extraterrestrias use to reform themselves outside the spaceship as the gigantic Millennian. However, the Millennian is unable to control Godzilla's genetic information in the DNA and mutates into a deformed creature named Orga. Godzilla recovers and brings down the UFO before fighting Orga, but Orga, having absorbed the regenerative properties of Godzilla's DNA, is highly resistant to injury. Orga retaliates and extracts more of Godzilla's DNA to become a perfect clone. Godzilla breaks free and sets Orga ablaze with his atomic breath attack, but Orga re-emerges and attempts to swallow Godzilla whole. As Orga begins to transform, Godzilla charges a nuclear pulse and unleashes it, vaporizing Orga's entire upper body and killing it.

As Godzilla approaches the observing humans, Mitsuo Katagiri, head of CCI, refuses to back down and chooses to confront Godzilla, and is killed when Godzilla partially destroys the roof of the building where he, Shinoda, and the authorities were observing the battle. Those remaining on the roof reminisce on how Godzilla was wrought by human ambition, prompting Shinoda to suggest that Godzilla exists in them, as Godzilla begins rampaging through Tokyo and destroys the city with his atomic breath attack.

== Cast ==
- Takehiro Murata as Yuji Shinoda, the founder of the Godzilla Prediction Network (GPN).
- Naomi Nishida as Yuki Ichinose, the reporter who works for Super Mystery Magazine Ooparts.
- Hiroshi Abe as Mitsuo Katagiri, the head scientist of Crisis Control Intelligence (CCI).
- Shirō Sano as Shiro Miyasaka, the executive of CCI.
- Mayu Suzuki as Io Shinoda, Yuji's daughter.
- Takeo Nakahara as Takada, the general and First Division chief of Japan Ground Self-Defense Force (JGSDF)
- Tsutomu Kitagawa as Godzilla, the mutant dinosaurian creature who serves as a literal force of nature in Japan.
- Makoto Ito as Orga, a mutant Millennian that absorb Godzilla's DNA and turns into the deformed version of Godzilla clone.

Koichi Ueda provides the voice of the director of Tōkai Nuclear Power Plant. Norman England was an extra running in a yellow Hawaiian Star Wars shirt.

=== English dub ===
- François Chau as Yuji Shinoda
- Denise Iketani as Yuki Ichinose
- Ron Yuan as Mitsuo Katagiri.
- Jack Ong as Shiro Miyasaka
- Rachael Crane as Io Shinoda
- Jim Ishida as General Takada
- Natalia D. Adams as the vocal effects of Orga

Michael Hagiwara, Rodney Kageyama, Denice Kumagai, Jim Lau, Dana Lee, Lucy Lin, Anthony J. Sacco, Michael Schlesinger, Yuki Tanaka, Marilyn Tokuda, Jerry Tondo and Ping Wu provides the additional voices in the film.

== Production ==
Due to high demand from fans to revive the Toho Godzilla, development began on a new Toho production two months after the release of TriStar's Godzilla. Executive producer Shogo Tomiyama hired Hiroshi Kashiwabara (writer of Godzilla vs. SpaceGodzilla) and Wataru Mimura (writer of Godzilla vs. Mechagodzilla II) to write the script, stating, "If we wanted to make a new kind of Godzilla, we needed several different views. That's why I chose both Mr Kashiwabara and Mr Mimura. One producer, two screenwriters, three viewpoints." Kashiwabara felt that they had to go back to Godzilla's roots and reexamine what made him unique.

=== Special effects ===
Regarding Godzilla's design, director Takao Okawara wanted to make "something new" and noted that Godzilla's height has changed over the years, stating, "I felt that that distance between human beings and Godzilla was too much, so we reduced its height back to something closer to the original at approximately 170 feet." The basic design of the suit was modelled heavily after the KingGoji suit from 1962's King Kong vs. Godzilla.

Godzilla 2000 was produced on a budget of approximately $8,300,000. Kenji Suzuki, who had worked as an assistant director on previous Godzilla movies, supervised the special effects. Miniature effects work was not emphasized as strongly as it had been in preceding installments. Instead, compositing techniques such as chroma key were heavily utilized to integrate the suitmation Godzilla footage into shots of real-life locations. The film also contains the first fully computer-generated shot of Godzilla realized in a Japanese production (previous films only used CGI to visualize graphical display representations of Godzilla or to blend computer effects work with a live-action shot). The film features around 400 visual effect shots.

== Release ==
Godzilla 2000: Millennium debuted at the Tokyo International Film Festival on November 6, 1999, where it had an "enthusiastic reception by fans". On December 11 of that same year, Toho released it nationwide in Japan. It was theatrically distributed in North America by TriStar Pictures through Sony Pictures on August 18, 2000. It was the last film in the franchise to receive a wide North American theatrical release until Godzilla Minus One (2023), though Shin Godzilla (2016) was given a limited release. The film returned to U.S. theaters for one day on November 1, 2023, celebrating Godzilla's 69th anniversary on Godzilla Day.

=== English versions ===
Two English dubs of the film were produced. As is standard practice for Toho, the film was originally dubbed in Hong Kong for use in Toho's international version. For Sony's theatrical release, the film was entirely re-dubbed by Asian-American voice actors (ADR director Mike Schlesinger deliberately made this choice because he did not want the characters to sound like they were "from Wisconsin."). Only one line from the international version ("As long as the beer's cold, who cares?") was used in the re-dubbed North American version. Several Indian versions use the English pictorial elements of the international version, however.

Sony's TriStar Pictures licensed Godzilla 2000 for theatrical distribution in North America. Sony spent approximately $300,000 to acquire the film, around $1 million to re-edit and dub the movie in English, and under $10 million on prints and advertising.

==== Alterations ====
The English dubbed version of the film runs 99 minutes - 8 minutes shorter in comparison to the 107-minute Japanese version. Most of these were minor edits done to hasten the pacing, and the sound design of the movie was completely re-worked, which included replacing the monster Orga's roar (which recycled Cretaceous King Ghidorah's from Rebirth of Mothra III) with a more menacing one and supplementing Godzilla's roars and growls with those from the 1998 film. J. Peter Robinson composed some new music meant to supplement Takayuki Hattori's music. The dubbing has a somewhat humorous, tongue-in-cheek tone to it, apparently in homage to Godzilla dubs of the 60s and 70s, with lines such as "Great Caesar's Ghost!", "Bite me!" and "I guarantee it'll [Full Metal Missiles] go through Godzilla like crap through a goose!". Dialogue was also reworked in places to change or jettison certain expository details. Some fans have criticized the English dubbed version of Godzilla 2000 for camping up what they perceive as a "serious" movie; however, Toho and Takao Okawara approved all the changes to the film in advance, and various amusing sequences throughout the story (such as people comically surviving Godzilla's rampage early in the film) establish a light-hearted tone and make it evident that it was not meant to be taken seriously. In an interview in Video Watchdog #71, Schlesinger noted that people in real life tend to speak humorously; he also felt that giving audiences some intentionally funny dialogue would make them less inclined to laugh at the monster scenes, which were supposed to be taken seriously. Originally, the film ended with the words "The End?" in cartoonish lettering, but Mike Schlesinger and Toho rejected that. "The End?" was removed from home video and television releases, though it was retained for the Spanish-subtitled VHS of the film.

=== Home media ===
In North America, Godzilla 2000 was released on DVD on December 26, 2000, and on Blu-ray on September 9, 2014. The North American Blu-ray includes both the Japanese and American cuts of the film.

== Reception ==
=== Box office ===
It opened in Japan on December 11, 1999, and grossed ¥1.65 billion (roughly $15 million) during its box office run, with approximately 2 million admissions. Toho had expected the film to gross US$40−50 million in Japan alone. Tristar Pictures released Godzilla 2000 in 2,111 North American theaters on August 18, 2000. Tristar hoped that the film would gross no worse than $12–15 million in North American theaters, but the film eventually only grossed $10 million in North American theaters.

=== Critical response ===
The North American release of Godzilla 2000 was met with mixed critical response. On Rotten Tomatoes 57% of critics gave the film a positive review based on 70 reviews, with an average rating of 5.70/10. The site's critics consensus reads, "Godzilla 2000 is cheesy, laughable, and good entertaining fun." On Metacritic, the film has a weighted average score of 41 out of 100 based on 23 critics, indicating "mixed or average reviews". Audiences polled by CinemaScore gave the film an average grade of "B−" on an A+ to F scale.

Bruce Westbrook of the Houston Chronicle said the film "taps into a now-rare and innocent sense of wonder," and that "its action scenes are well-conceived," summarizing it as "a lovably amusing foray into vapid plotting, bad dubbing and men in rubber suits trashing miniature sets." Owen Gleiberman of Entertainment Weekly gave the film a "B" grade, saying that Godzilla 2000 "lands on an imaginative fault line somewhere between tackiness and awe." Jay Carr of The Boston Globe called Godzilla 2000 "a ton of fun, and then some." James Berardinelli of ReelViews said the film "uses the Godzilla formula effectively" and "represents solid, campy, escapist entertainment." Maitland McDonagh of TV Guide praised the film, saying that "fans won't want to miss this addition to the canon." Leonard Maltin gave it 3 out of 4 and praised "fine effects and sharp script, weighed down only by a drawn-out monster-clash climax."

Susan Wloszczyna of USA Today said Godzilla 2000 "may be dull, but the familiarity of it all makes it feel ceremonial, a reassuring ritual." David Edelstein of Slate said that he "periodically tranced out," but added that "it's fun to see" and "it still manages to dispel some of the lingering stink of Roland Emmerich's 1998 remake." Stephen Holden of The New York Times wasn't impressed, saying that "only a die-hard fan of the long-running Japanese Godzilla series could love Godzilla 2000." Stephen Hunter of The Washington Post remarked, "Godzilla, go home."

=== Accolades ===
Godzilla 2000 was nominated as Best Home Video Release at the 27th Saturn Awards.

== Unproduced sequel ==
In an interview with SciFiJapan.com, Michael Schlesinger stated that he had written a script for a direct sequel to Godzilla 2000 entitled Godzilla Reborn that was to be directed by Joe Dante. The film would have shared the same tongue-in-cheek tone as the American release of Godzilla 2000, with special effects crafted by Toho. The plot would have involved Godzilla appearing in Hawaii to battle a new foe named "Miba", which was envisioned as a flying lava monster resembling a bat. Toho approved Schlensinger's script, but he was unable to secure funding for the project and the film was never made.
