= Kenji Suzuki =

Kenji Suzuki may refer to:

- Kenji Suzuki (announcer) (鈴木 健二, born 1929), Japanese television announcer
- Kenji Suzuki (director) (鈴木 健二, born 1957), Japanese special effects director and actor
- Kenji Suzuki (footballer) (鈴木 健児, born 1986), Japanese footballer
- Kenji Suzuki (鈴木 健二, born 1950), better known as Damo Suzuki, Japanese musician

== See also ==
- Suzuki (disambiguation)
