= Mizuho Yoshida =

Japanese actor (born 1965)

- Born: 12 September 1965 (age 61); Kanagawa Prefecture, Japan
- Occupation: Actor

Mizuho Yoshida (吉田瑞穂, Yoshida Mizuho) (born September 12, 1965 in Kanagawa Prefecture) is a Japanese actor. He is best known for playing Legion Queen in 1996 Gamera film Gamera 2: Attack of Legion, Desghidorah in 1996 Mothra film Rebirth of Mothra, Dagahra in 1997 Mothra sequel film Rebirth of Mothra II, Godzilla in the 2001 Millennium-era Godzilla film Godzilla, Mothra and King Ghidorah: Giant Monsters All-Out Attack and Zedus in 2006 Gamera film Gamera the Brave. He also provided motion capture for several video games.

== Films ==
- 1991 - Zeiram as Zeiram
- 1994 - Zeiram 2 as Zeiram
- 1995 - Gakko no Kaidan
- 1996 - Gakkō no Kaidan 2
- 1997 - Gakkō no Kaidan 3
- 1996 - Gamera 2: Attack of Legion as Legion Queen
- 1996 - Rebirth of Mothra as Desghidorah
- 1997 - Rebirth of Mothra II as Dagahra
- 1997 - Homo erectus pekinensis Who are you? as Mammoth
- 2001 - Godzilla, Mothra and King Ghidorah: Giant Monsters All-Out Attack as Godzilla
- 2005 - Kamen Rider The First as Cobra
- 2006 - Gamera the Brave as Zedus
- 2009 - Deep Sea Monster Raiga as Raiga

== Video games ==
- 2004 - Metal Gear Solid 3: Snake Eater as Naked Snake
- 2004 - Metal Gear Solid: The Twin Snakes as Solid Snake
- 2003 - Resident Evil Outbreak
- 2003 - Dino Crisis 3 as Jacob Ranshaw
- 2001 - Metal Gear Solid 2: Sons of Liberty as Solid Snake
- 2001 - Resident Evil – Code: Veronica X
- 2001 - Onimusha: Warlords
- 2000 - Resident Evil – Code: Veronica
