= Sayaka Yamaguchi =

Japanese actress (born 1980)

- 山口 紗弥加
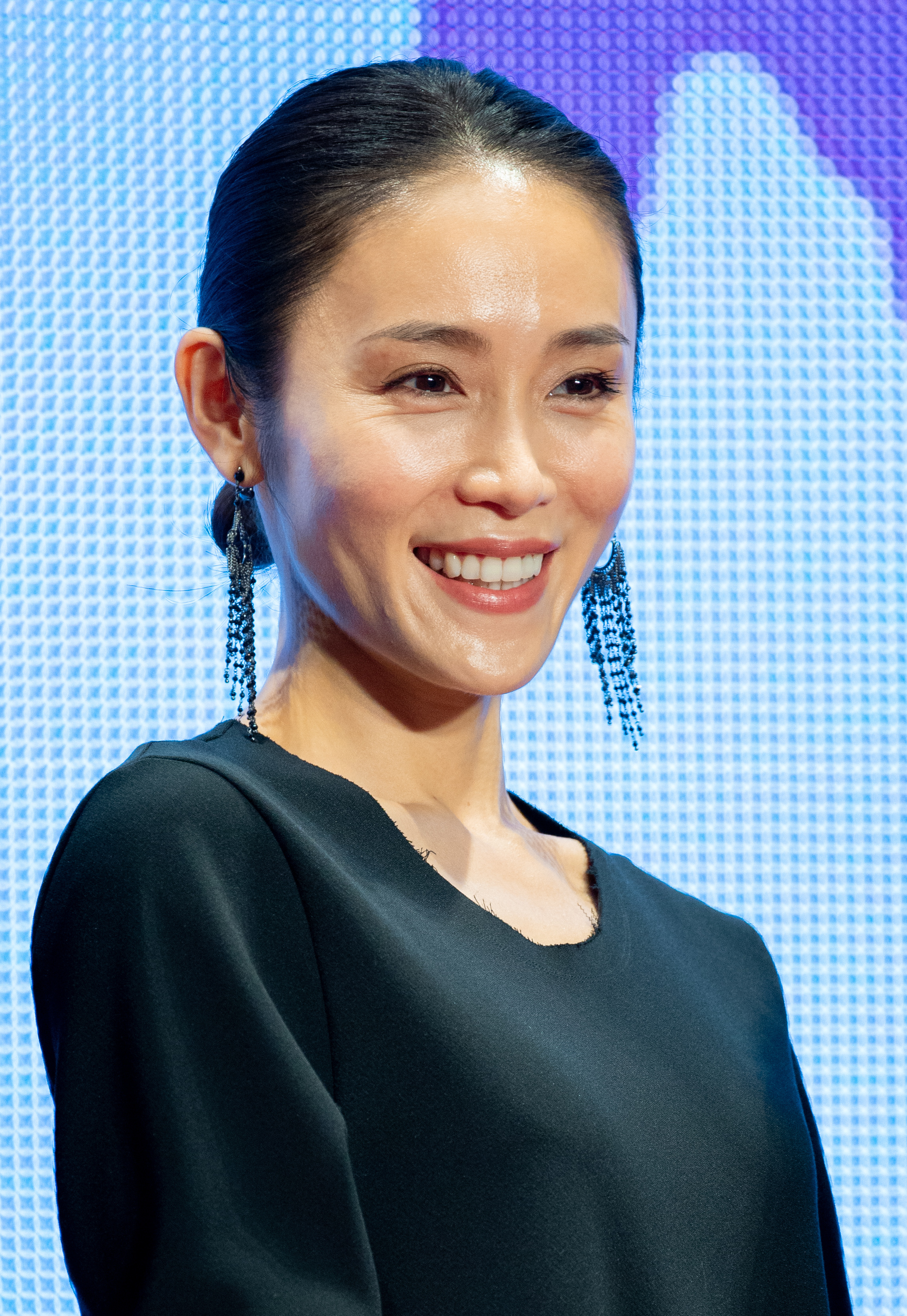
- Yamaguchi at the Tokyo International Film Festival in 2018
- Born: 14 February 1980 (age 46); Fukuoka Prefecture, Japan
- Occupation: Actress
- Years active: 1994-present
- Agent: FLaMme
- Website: flamme.co.jp/SayakaYamaguchi

Sayaka Yamaguchi (山口 紗弥加, Yamaguchi Sayaka; born 14 February 1980 in Fukuoka Prefecture) is a Japanese actress.

== Appearances ==
=== Films ===
- Rebirth of Mothra (1996), Lora
- Tokimeki Memorial (1997), Mishio Yokoyama
- Rebirth of Mothra II (1997), Lora
- Rebirth of Mothra III (1998), narration only
- Tomie: Replay (2000), Yumi Morita
- Kenchō no Hoshi (2006), Mika Tahata
- Gigolo Wannabe (2006)
- Cheke Raccho!! (2006), Mina Haebaru
- Nonchan Noriben (2009), Reika Tamagawa
- Nodame Cantabile Saishū Gakushō Zenpen (2009), Yūko Namiki
- Nodame Cantabile Saishū Gakushō Kouhen (2010), Yūko Namiki
- Softboy (2010)
- Rāmen Samurai (2011)
- Soup: Umare Kawari no Monogatari (2012)
- Flare (2014)
- April Fools (2015), Eriko Etō
- Rin (2018), Nozomi Satonaka
- The House Where the Mermaid Sleeps (2018), Miharu
- The Confidence Man JP: The Movie (2019)
- Threads: Our Tapestry of Love (2020), Mayumi Sonoda
- Tomorrow's Dinner Table (2021), Nana Wakasugi
- What She Likes... (2021), Mizuki
- Will I Be Single Forever? (2021)
- Radiation House: The Movie (2022)
- As Long as We Both Shall Live (2023), Kanoko Saimori
- See Hear Love (2023), Megumi Tōyama

=== TV dramas ===
- Wakamono no Subete (Fuji TV, 1994)
- Oishī Kankei (Fuji TV, 1996), Yumi Mori
- Purple Eyes in the Dark (TV Asahi, 1997), Maiko Ozaki
- Futari: Wherever You Are (TV Asahi, 1997)
- Kōritsuku Natsu (YTV, 1998), Eriko Oikawa
- Kawaī Dakeja Dame Kashira? (TV Asahi, 1999), Setsuko Taniguchi
- Gekka no Kishi (TV Asahi, 2000), Mayumi Tachihara
- Hanamura Daisuke (KTV, 2000)
- Koi Suru Top Lady (KTV, 2002), Mari
- My Little Chef Episode 4 (TBS, 2002), Aki Ejima
- Engimono Machine Nikki (Fuji TV, 2003), Sachiko
- Boku to Kanojo to Kanojo no Ikiru Michi (KTV, 2004), Mami Tsuboi
- Water Boys 2 (Fuji TV, 2004), Natsuko Ōhara
- Wakaba (NHK, 2005), Aki Fujikura
- Anego (NTV, 2005), Kana Saotome
- Shimokita Sundays (TV Asahi, 2006), Akiko Emoto
- 14-sai no Haha (NTV, 2006), Kōko Endō
- Kekkon Hirōen: Jinsei Saiaku no 3-jikan (Fuji TV, 2007), Yukari Sawaguchi
- Konshū Tsuma ga Uwaki Shimasu Episode 7 (Fuji TV, 2007), Mai Mizusawa
- Abarenbō Mama (Fuji TV, 2007), Yae Kominami
- Kimi Hannin Janai Yone? Episode 4 (TV Asahi, 2008), Risa Kamogawa
- Yasuko to Kenji (NTV, 2008), Kaori Miyazono
- Shōni Kyūmei (TV Asahi, 2008), Rui Higuchi
- Akai Ito (Fuji TV, 2008), Machiko Ishikawa
- Konkatsu! Episode 3 (Fuji TV, 2009), Anri Kaneko
- Zettai Reido: Mikaiketsu Jiken Tokumei Sōsa (Fuji TV, 2010), Ryōko Takamine
- Ōgon no Buta: Kaikei Kensachō Tokubetsu Chōsaka (NTV, 2010), Mizore Tsutsumi
- Zettai Reido: Tokushu Hanzai Sennyū Sōsa (Fuji TV, 2011), Ryōko Takamine
- Hunter: Sono Onnatachi, Shōkin Kasegi (KTV, 2011), Akane Isaka
- Hayami-san to Yobareru Hi (Fuji TV, 2012), Aki Irie
- Toshi Densetsu no Onna Episode 5 (TV Asahi, 2012), Sakura Ōkusu
- Tokyo Airport: Tokyo Kūkō Kansei Hoanbu (Fuji TV, 2012), Reiko Jōnouchi
- Galileo Season 2 (Fuji TV, 2013), Harumi Wakayama
- Andō Lloyd: A.I. knows Love? (TBS, 2013), Sakiko Komatsu
- Silent Poor (NHK, 2014), Junko Mizusawa
- Kazoku Gari (TBS, 2014), Miho Kiyooka
- Kindaichi Kōsuke vs Akechi Kogorō Futatabi (Fuji TV, 2014)
- Binta!: Bengoshi Jimuin Minowa ga Ai de Kaiketsu Shimasu (YTV, 2014), Natsumi Takada
- Renzoku Drama W Episode 47 "Scapegoat" (WOWOW, 2015), Tsukasa Matsumoto
- Yōkoso, Wagaya e (Fuji TV, 2015), Setsuko Nishizawa
- Yamegoku: Yakuza Yamete Itadakimasu (TBS, 2015), Shōko Aridome
- Risk no Kamisama (Fuji TV, 2015), Yuka Tachibana
- Kōnodori (TBS, 2015), Megumi Arai
- Naotora: The Lady Warlord (NHK, 2017), Natsu
- The Supporting Actors (TV Tokyo, 2017), Herself
- Yuganda Hamon (NHK, 2019)
- Radiation House (2019–2021)
- Welcome Home, Monet (NHK, 2021), Mikako Takahashi
- Soar High! (NHK, 2023), Jun Misono

== Bibliography ==
=== Photobooks ===
- "Tokimeki Memorial" Photobook (Summer Memory) (July 1997), Wani Books, ISBN 9784847024672
- Precious (May 1998), Wani Books, ISBN 9784847024924
- Fragile (8 September 2000), Shueisha, ISBN 9784087803143
- Gekkan Yamaguchi Sayaka (Shincho Mook) (April 2003), Shinchosha, ISBN 9784107901132

== Discography ==
=== Albums ===
- Romantic (Pioneer LDC, 26 May 1999)

=== Singles ===
- Baby Moon (Pioneer LDC, 24 June 1998)
- Little Wing (Pioneer LDC, 28 October 1998)
- Akai Hana: Missing You (Pioneer LDC, 16 December 1998)
- April Fool (Pioneer LDC, 28 April 1999)
- 100%Love (Pioneer LDC, 24 May 2000)
- Toy Ring: Love Me 100%! (Antinos Records, 7 March 2001)
