= Toshiyuki Watanabe =

Japanese composer

Toshiyuki "Toshi" Watanabe (渡辺 俊幸 Watanabe Toshiyuki; born February 3, 1955) is a Japanese musician and composer, known for writing film scores.

== Early life ==
Tohsiyuke Watanabe (also referred to as Toshi) was born on February 3, 1955 in Nagoya, Japan. He is the son of legendary tokusatsu and anime composer, Michiaki Watanabe.

== Career ==
Watanabe has scored multiple films and anime. His most notable works are the Mothra trilogy in the 1990s and the award-winning anime seriesUchū Kyōdai ("Space Brothers") from 2012 to 2014.

In he wrote a drum kit concerto for Australian drummer David Jones.

== Notable film scores ==
- Declaration of a Domineering Husband (1979)
- The Makioka Sisters (1983)
- Jiro's Story (1987)
- Golf Yoakemae (1987)
- Rebirth of Mothra (1996)
- Rebirth of Mothra II (1997)
- Rebirth of Mothra III (1998)
- Milk White (2003)
- Gege (2004)
- Okāsan no Ki (2015)
- Mazinger Z: Infinity (2017)
- Shinkansen Henkei Robo Shinkalion the Movie: Mirai Kara Kita Shinsoku no ALFA-X (2019)

== Television scores ==
- Ginga Hyōryū Vifam (1983–1984)
- Bosco Adventure (1986–1987)
- Metal Armor Dragonar (1987–1988) (with Kentarō Haneda)
- The Adventures of Peter Pan (1989)
- The Three-Eyed One (1990–1991)
- The Brave Fighter of Sun Fighbird (1991–1992)
- Mōri Motonari (1997)
- Ginga Hyōryū Vifam 13 (1998)
- Kyuukyuu Sentai GoGoFive (1999–2000)
- Galactic Armored Fleet Majestic Prince (2013)
- Space Brothers (2012–2014)
- Kabukimono Keiji (2015)
- Shinkansen Henkei Robo Shinkalion THE ANIMATION (2018–2019)

== Video game scores ==
- Shenmue (1999) (orchestration)
- Chase the Express (2000)
- Shenmue II (2001) (orchestration)

== Sources ==
- Galbraith, Stuart (2008). The Toho Studios Story: A History and Complete Filmography. Scarecrow Press. ISBN 978-0-8108-6004-9.
- Kamiwatari, Ryohei (2009). 風の環武藤順九の宇宙: 特別付録CD「風の環の歌」付き [Circle Wind: The World of Junkyu Muto] (in Japanese). PHP (研究所). ISBN 978-4-569-77360-5.
- "Discography". Toshiyuki Watanabe Official Site. Archived from the original on March 10, 2012.
