= Orochi, the Eight-Headed Dragon =

- Theatrical release poster
- Directed by: Takao Okawara
- Screenplay by: Wataru Mimura
- Based on: Kojiki and Nihon Shoki The Three Treasures by Hiroshi Inagaki
- Produced by: Shogo Tomiyama
- Starring: Masahiro Takashima; Yasuko Sawaguchi; Akaji Maro; Yūki Meguro; Saburo Shinoda
- Cinematography: Yoshinori Sekiguchi
- Edited by: Nobuo Ogawa
- Music by: Kiyoko Ogino
- Production company: Toho Pictures
- Distributed by: Toho
- Release date: 9 July 1994 (Japan)
- Running time: 105 minutes
- Country: Japan
- Language: Japanese
- Box office: ¥800 million

Orochi, the Eight-Headed Dragon (Japanese: ヤマトタケル, Hepburn: Yamato Takeru) is a 1994 Japanese epic kaiju fantasy film directed by Takao Okawara and produced by Shogo Tomiyama, with a screenplay by Wataru Mimura. Distributed by Toho and produced under their subsidiary Toho Pictures, the film is based on Japanese mythology, specifically the birth of Shinto. It stars Masahiro Takashima, Yasuko Sawaguchi, Akaji Maro, Yūki Meguro and Saburo Shinoda.

The film was conceived as a film serialization, and was released as a part of the media mix along with the TBS anime series Yamato Takeru (which and Orochi, the Eight-Headed Dragon shared the ending theme song "RAIN" by Glay), and the CoroCoro Comic manga series Yamato Takeru by Shogakukan, however its sequels were eventually terminated.

== Plot ==
In the ancient times, the moon god Tsukuyomi, who is jealous of his sister and sun goddess, Amaterasu, transforms into the eight-headed serpent named Orochi and intends to destroy the Earth. Fortunately, the sea god Susanoo defeats Tsukuyomi and seals his power inside the enchanted Sword of Dark Clouds. Tsukuyomi's father, Izanagi, fearful of his son causing chaos again, seals him inside a crystalline ice prison and sends it far away from the Earth.

Many years later, emperor Keiko of Yamato feels a great loathing for one of his twin sons, Ousu, after their births. Being convinced that this feeling is a premonition, Keiko orders the mysterious shaman Tsukinowa to kill Ousu, yet his efforts are spoiled by Amano Shiratori, the phoenix and the White Bird of the Heavens. Keiko's sister, seeing this as a clear sign of divine intervention, takes it upon herself to raise Ousu.

10 years later, Ousu is stopped by his aunt's servants Genbu and Seiryu who prevent him from entering a mysterious cave. At night, Ousu finds a strange comma-shaped gemstone, which teleports him to a mysterious realm where he meets King Bullhead. The King prophesies that Ousu will become a warrior of the gods once he possesses three lights; he teleports Ousu back to the cave. When Ousu has matured into an adult, he is given pardon by Keiko and allowed to return to the castle. However, not long after, Ousu's mother, Empress Inahi, dies from a mysterious illness. This sends Ousu's brother into a rage and causes him to attack Ousu, who defends himself and accidentally kills his brother with his gemstone in the process.

Keiko, furious at these events, orders Ousu to leave the castle and not return until the barbarians living in the Kumaso domain are dealt with. Ousu makes haste to complete this task, stopping off at a shrine on his way where, after a quick battle, he befriends a young priestess named Oto Tachibana who joins him on his journey. They, along with Genbu and Seiryu, raid the castle, killing king Kumaso Takeru, who attempts to sacrifice Oto to Kumaso's god Kumasogami. Ousu destroys the monstrous deity with his gemstone, and receives the shrine mirror from Amano.

Following this defeat, Ousu gains the title "Yamato Takeru", yet fails to win the acceptance of Keiko. His aunt, though, warns him of a great threat looming overhead, as Tsukuyomi is poised to return, endangering the Earth. Ousu must prepare to keep this from occurring. She tells him to bring the Sword of Dark Clouds to her for safekeeping as it holds a good deal of Tsukuyomi's power. He secures the sword but is tricked by Tsukinowa - who summoned Kaishin Muba, disguised as Inahi, and revealed himself to be one of Tsukuyomi's fangs - into surrendering it, thus inadvertently restoring Tsukuyomi to full power. Tsukinowa also reveals that it was he who killed Inahi and Ousu's brother to frame Ousu, causing Ousu to mortally wound Tsukinowa in retaliation.

The solar eclipse falls over Earth as Tsukuyomi blots out the sunlight and reclaims the Sword of Dark Clouds from Tsukinowa, who reverts into his fang form after he dies, and unleashes chaos to the Earth. Ousu is told by King Bullhead, who reveals himself to be Susanoo, that his divinely ordained destiny is to destroy Tsukuyomi with the aid of Oto, who revealed to be the incarnation of Amaterasu. Susanoo tests Ousu by having him pull the Sword of Karasai from a stone, and tells him that it is the only weapon that can kill Tsukuyomi. Together, Ousu and Oto are transported to the moon to face Tsukuyomi, who transforms himself into Orochi once again. Ousu and Oto are aided by Amano to launch an aerial attack on Tsukuyomi, but are overpowered.

As they have both lost their lives, Oto sacrifices herself to gives Ousu her life energy. Ousu realizes that Susanoo's prophecy has come true, as he now has all three lights - the shrine mirror, the Sword of Karasai, and Oto's spirit. Ousu transforms into a gigantic and radiant warrior, Utsuno Ikusagami, and fights and defeats Tsukuyomi, who reverts into his human form after being defeated.

With Tsukuyomi's defeat, Oto is restored to life. Susanoo telepathically tells Ousu to seal Tsukuyomi in his gemstone, then cast it into outer space, causing the eclipse to end and the sun to shine again on Earth. As Ousu and Oto mount Amano to fly home to Earth, Keiko says he wants to see Ousu. In the end, Ousu and Oto reluctantly part ways as Ousu returns the Sword of Dark Clouds to Yamato.

== Cast ==
- Masahiro Takashima as Prince Ousu, also known by his title "Yamato Takeru", the warrior prince of Yamato and one of the film's main protagonists.
- Yasuko Sawaguchi as Oto Tachibana, a young priestess, Ousu's love interest, the reincarnation of Amaterasu and one of the film's main protagonists.
- Akaji Maro as Tsukinowa, Keiko's mysterious shaman who is actually Orochi's fang in his human form and the film's secondary antagonist.
- Saburo Shinoda as Keiko, the emperor of Yamato and Ousu's father.
- Keaki Mori as Inahi, Keiko's consort and Ousu's mother.
- Bengal as Genbu, one of Yamatohime's servants.
- Miyashi Ishibashi as Seiryu, one of Yamatohime's servants.
- Hiroshi Fujioka as Kumaso Takeru, the unnamed king of Kumaso who attempts to sacrifice Oto to Kumasogami.
- Yuki Meguro as Susanoo, also known by his moniker King Bullhead, the king of the mysterious realm and the sea god.
- Hiroshi Abe as Tsukuyomi, the moon god, Amaterasu's brother and the film's main antagonist.
- Nobuko Miyamoto as Yamatohime, Ousu's aunt and Keiko's sister.
- Miho Akishino as Etachibana, Oto's sister.
- Akira Koieyama as Ousu's brother who accidentally got killed by his younger brother.
- Hurricane Ryu as Kumasogami, the god of Kumaso.
- Kenpachiro Satsuma as Orochi, the eight-headed serpent and the monstrous form of Tsukuyomi.
- Wataru Fukuda as Utsuno Ikusagami, the warrior of the gods and the gigantic form of Ousu.
- Yuji Saeki as Kaishin Muba, the sea monster summoned by Tsukinowa.

== Production ==
Orochi, the Eight-Headed Dragon marked Toho's first non-Godzilla Kaiju film since the 1970s.

== Release ==
Orochi, the Eight-Headed Dragon was distributed theatrically by Toho in Japan on 9 July 1994.

The film was released in the United States as Orochi the Eight-Headed Dragon directly to home video by ADV Films with an English dub on June 13, 1999. The film was reissued in Japanese with English subtitles in 2003.

== Reception ==
Robert Firsching of AllMovie awarded the film three-and-a-half stars out of five, stating that "the film is firmly in the province of magical fantasy, and is quite a good example of the form [...] Many films attempt to capture the look and feel of 1960s fantasy, but most fall prey to '90s cynicism and can't quite pull off the necessarily naïve belief in heroism and the power of goodness and purity to save mankind, or even that the belief that mankind is worth saving. This film does, and that alone makes it a refreshing throwback, and a great way to spend a Saturday afternoon."

== Cancelled sequels ==
Orochi, the Eight-Headed Dragon was originally intended as the first entry of a film trilogy. Despite facing a competition against The Lion King by Walt Disney Animation Studios and Pom Poko by Studio Ghibli, it fared relatively well as a domestic film at the box office. However, this was vastly inferior to the Heisei Godzilla continuity, and Toho decided to cancell its serialization, and the Heisei Mothra trilogy became the successor of the Godzilla series instead of Orochi, the Eight-Headed Dragon; one of Orochi heads was remodeled into a Desghidorah prop in Rebirth of Mothra (1996). The second film was supposed to involve the kaiju "Bagan", a scrapped adversary from previously cancelled film projects, The Return of Godzilla (1978), and Mothra vs. Bagan (1990).

== See also ==
- The Three Treasures
- Ghidorah, the Three-Headed Monster
- Godzilla vs. King Ghidorah
- Rebirth of Mothra III
