= Minoru Watanabe =

Japanese stuntman and suit actor

- Born: 3 April 1962 (age 63); Tokyo, Japan
- Occupations: Stuntman, actor

Minoru Watanabe (渡辺実, Watanabe Minoru; April 3, 1962) is a Japanese stuntman and suit actor.

== TV ==
- 1982: Dai Sentai Goggle V – Ninja Officer
- 1983: Kagaku Sentai Dynaman
- 1985: Dengeki Sentai Changeman – Navigator Gaata / Officer Watanabe
- 1986: Choushinsei Flashman – Kerao
- 1987: Hikari Sentai Maskman
- 1987: Kamen Rider Black
- 1988: Kamen Rider Black RX – Fanged Captain Gedorian
- 1991: Choujin Sentai Jetman – Neo Jetman 3
- 1992: Kyōryū Sentai Zyuranger – Bookback
- 1993: Gosei Sentai Dairanger – KibaRanger
- 1997: B-Robo Kabutack
- 2013: Kamen Rider Wizard – Raum / Kaga

== Films ==
- 2000: Godzilla vs. Megaguirus – Megaguirus
