= Mazinger Z: Infinity =

2017 film by Junji Shimizu

- Japanese release poster
- 劇場版 マジンガーZ / INFINITY
- Directed by: Junji Shimizu
- Screenplay by: Takahiro Ozawa
- Based on: Mazinger Z by Go Nagai
- Starring: Showtaro Morikubo; Ai Kayano; Sumire Uesaka; Unshō Ishizuka
- Music by: Toshiyuki Watanabe
- Production company: Toei Animation
- Distributed by: Toei Company, Ltd.
- Release date: October 28, 2017
- Running time: 94 minutes
- Country: Japan
- Language: Japanese

Mazinger Z: Infinity (劇場版 マジンガーZ / INFINITY, Gekijōban Majingā Zetto / Infiniti) is a 2017 Japanese animated super robot film directed by Junji Shimizu. It serves as a sequel to the Mazinger Z and Great Mazinger anime series. The film takes place 10 years after the events of the original series. The film was produced to commemorate the 45th anniversary of the original Mazinger Z. It premiered worldwide in on October 28, 2017, at the 12th Rome Film Festival, and in Japan on January 13, 2018.

== Plot ==
Ten years after the end of the war against Dr. Hell and his Mechanical Beasts, the world lives in an era of peace thanks to the development of photonic energy for peaceful purposes. Mazinger Z's pilot Koji Kabuto has become a distinguished scientist, after his father and grandfather, while Sayaka Yumi is now the director of the Photon Research Institute, after her father, Dr. Yumi, became the Prime Minister of Japan. Great Mazinger's pilot Tetsuya Tsurugi is still in the military and married to Jun Hono, who is expecting their first child. Koji's younger brother Shiro is also a military mecha pilot.

While constructing the institute's new building, they find an enormous robot buried beneath Mt. Fuji, which they codename Infinity. When Koji comes to investigate, a girl emerges from the inside. Lisa is the robot's main control unit, a 91% organic AI with feelings. Shortly before, the presumed dead Dr. Hell attacks the institute with new Mechanical Beasts, as well as his henchmen Baron Ashura and Count Brocken, and steals the Infinity, using a captured Tetsuya and Great Mazinger as improvised activation key, since he was unable to get Lisa. Lisa reveals that the final power of the Infinity is the Goragon, the ability to exchange their universe with another, by causing a forced quantum overlapping. Dr. Hell plans to use it, as he believes this world is not worth existing.

Dr. Nossori and Dr. Sewashi use a giant photonic energy 3D Printer to repair and upgrade the original Mazinger Z (which was hidden at the old Photon Research Institute). Koji and Lisa, in the refurbished Mazinger Z, infiltrate the invaded Photon Institute, battling the Mechanical Beasts inside. After defeating Baron Ashura and Count Brocken, Mazinger Z confronts Dr. Hell's robot, but is gravely damaged. Shiro rescues Great Mazinger, and they stop the Goragon countdown but Dr. Hell has a backup of Great Mazinger's activation code on his Bardos scepter and takes control of Infinity, activating Goragon.

In the adjacent dimension, Koji sees an alternate universe where Lisa is his and Sayaka's daughter. Lisa uses herself as a key to give Mazinger a power equivalent to Infinity's, by transmuting photonic energy into matter. Everyone on the planet gives their photonic energy to Mazinger Z, and Koji punches Infinity with Dr. Hell out of the planet, where it explodes. Lisa disappears, assuring Koji they will see each other again. Meanwhile, Jun gives birth to her and Tetsuya's child.

Afterwards, Koji and Sayaka marry and they are seen walking with a child Lisa.

== Voice cast ==
Character	Japanese	English
Koji Kabuto	Showtaro Morikubo	Wayne Grayson
Sayaka Yumi	Ai Kayano	Alyson Leigh Rosenfeld
Dr. Hell	Unshō Ishizuka	Mike Pollock
Dr. Nossori	Bin Shimada	Billy Regan
Nuke	Masami Kikuchi	Billy Bob Thompson
Count Brocken	Keiji Fujiwara	Bill Lobley (Credited as Colin A. Favor)
Lisa	Sumire Uesaka	Courtney Shaw
Tetsuya Tsurugi	Toshihiko Seki	Dan Green
Shiro Kabuto	Natsuki Hanae	Eddy Lee
Gennosuke Yumi	Junpei Morita	H.D. Quinn
Dr. Sewashi	Kōzō Shioya	Henry Carr
Mucha	Kappei Yamaguchi	Jason Griffith
Jun Hono	Ami Koshimizu	Kymberly Tuttle
Ashura	Hiroyuki Miyasako	Marc Thompson (male)
Ashura	Romi Park	Martha Harms (female)
Boss	Wataru Takagi	J. David Brimmer (Michael Alston Baley)
Yasohachi Yamagishi	Ryōichi Tanaka	Jake Paque
Takagi		James Weaver Clark
Misato	Kana Ueda	Leigh Craig
Fukurokoji	Masahiro Ogata	Robb Moreira

== Production and release ==
The movie was announced during AnimeJapan 2017, with the tentative title of Gekijōban Mazinger Z (Mazinger Z The Movie). The final title, Gekijōban Mazinger Z / Infinity (Movie Version Mazinger Z / Infinity), was revealed in the official website in August 2018, alongside the film's trailer.

The film was produced by Toei Animation and distributed by its parent company, Toei. It was directed by Junji Shimizu, based on a script by Takahiro Ozawa, with Hiroya Iijima as character designer and Takayuki Yanase as mecha designer. Toshiyuki Watanabe composed the music. He is the son of Michiaki Watanabe, the composer for the original Mazinger Z and Great Mazinger series. Ichiro Mizuki performed a new version of the classic theme song. He was the performer of the song for the original Mazinger Z and Great Mazinger anime series, as well as several films of the franchise. It was his final theme song contribution before his death.

A 30-second trailer debuted at Annecy International Animation Film Festival in France in June 2017. The film's world premiere was at the 12th Rome Film Festival on October 28, 2017, presented by author Go Nagai, who was also present at the French premiere in Paris on October 30, 2017. It opened theatrically in Italy on October 31 and in France on November 22, 2017. The Japanese premiere was on January 13, 2018, and the film opened at #6 at the Japanese box office. It premiered in Spain on January 19, 2018 It was released on DVD and Blu-Ray disc in Japan on August 18, 2018.

In November 2017, Viz Media announced at Anime NYC that had licensed the movie in North America, and will release it in the US in 2018. The film had a limited English subbed theatrical screening theatrically in the United States from February 11 to February 12, 2018. The film was distributed on Blu-ray and DVD in North America by Viz Media and Warner Bros. Home Entertainment on February 19, 2019.
