= Wataru Mimura =

Japanese screenwriter (1954–2021)

- Born: May 7, 1954; Mie Prefecture, Japan
- Died: August 26, 2021 (aged 67)
- Occupation: Screenwriter
- Years active: 1987-2015

Wataru Mimura (三村 渉, Mimura Wataru; May 7, 1954 – August 26, 2021) was a Japanese screenwriter with a career largely focused around Toho's Godzilla series. On August 26, 2021, Mimura died from multiple system atrophy.

== Biography ==
Born in Mie Prefecture and graduating from the College of Art of Nihon University, Mimura won Sanrio Screenwriter Award in 1982, which led to writing such theatrical films as Shochiku's Green Boy and V-Cinema work for Toei Company. Mimura was chosen to pen the script for Godzilla vs. Mechagodzilla II (1993), as well as Toho's Yamato Takeru (1994) soon after. In 1999, Toho again turned to Mimura when they revived the Godzilla franchise. The resulting film, Godzilla 2000 (1999), was not a great box office success, but Mimura continued to write for the remainder of the Millennium series, as he scripted four out of the six films, including Godzilla: Final Wars (2004). After several years of illness, Mimura died in Mie Prefecture August 26, 2021.

== Filmography ==
=== Writer ===
- Godzilla vs. Mechagodzilla II (1993)
- Yamato Takeru (1994)
- Godzilla 2000 (1999)
- Godzilla vs. Megaguirus (2000)
- Godzilla Against Mechagodzilla (2002)
- Godzilla: Final Wars (2004)
