= The God of Clay =

2011 Japanese film directed by Koichi Kawakita and Nobuaki Sugimoto

- Theatrical release poster

Japanese name
- Kanji: ねんどの神さま
Transcriptions
- Revised Hepburn: Nendo no Kamisama
- Directed by: Koichi Kawakita; Nobuaki Sugimoto
- Based on: A novel by Masamoto Nasu
- Produced by: Norihiko Iwasaki
- Cinematography: Takehiro Kuramochi; Keiichi Sakurai
- Edited by: Koichi Kawakita
- Production companies: Dream Planet Japan; Marbling Fine Arts
- Release date: June 23, 2011
- Running time: 13 minutes
- Country: Japan
- Language: Japanese
- Budget: $40,000

The God of Clay (Japanese: ねんどの神さま, Hepburn: Nendo no Kamisama) is a 2011 independently made Japanese short kaiju film initially directed by Nobuaki Sugimoto, and was completed by Koichi Kawakita and co-produced by Dream Planet Japan and Marbling Fine Arts. The film is based on the 1993 children's book of the same name by Masamoto Nasu.

== Production ==
- Directed by Koichi Kawakita, Nobuaki Sugimoto
- Produced by Norihiko Iwasaki
- Cinematography by Takehiro Kuramochi, Keiichi Sakurai
- Edited by Koichi Kawakita

== Release ==
The film premiered at the Bigfoot Crest Theater in Westwood, Los Angeles on June 23, 2011.
