= 1997 in Japanese television =

Events in 1997 in Japanese television.

== Events ==
- February 8- The final episode of the popular anime series Sailor Moon is aired.
- September 1- Cartoon Network launches in Japan.
- December 16- Dennō Senshi Porygon, an episode of Pokémon, is aired on TV Tokyo in Japan. 20 minutes in the episode, Ash Ketchum's Pikachu uses his Thunderbolt attack on vaccine missiles, causing red and blue strobe lights flashing rapidly. This gives 685 viewers (310 boys and 375 girls) seizures and causes Indigo League (The series of Pokémon) to go into hiatus until April 1998. Its time slot was taken over by Class King Yamazaki (学級王ヤマザキ).
- December 24- AT-X starts broadcasting.

== Debuting this year ==
Show	Station	Premiere Date	Genre	Original Run
Cutie Honey Flash	TV Asahi	February 15	anime	February 15, 1997 – January 31, 1998
Chuuka Ichiban!	Fuji TV	April 27	anime	April 27, 1997 – September 13, 1998
Denji Sentai Megaranger	TV Asahi	February 14	tokusatsu	February 14, 1997 – February 15, 1998
Doctor Slump (Remake)	Fuji TV	November 26	anime	November 26, 1997 – September 22, 1999
Fair, then Partly Piggy	TV Tokyo	July 3	anime	July 3, 1997 – September 29, 1998
Flame of Recca	Fuji TV	July 19	anime	July 19, 1997 – July 10, 1998
Hare Tokidoki Buta	TV Tokyo	July 3	anime	July 3, 1997 – September 29, 1998
The King of Braves GaoGaiGar	Nagoya TV	February 1	anime	February 1, 1997 – January 31, 1998
Love Generation	Fuji TV	October 13	drama	October 13, 1997 - December 22, 1997
Super Mashin Hero Wataru	TV Tokyo	October 2	anime	October 2, 1997 – September 24, 1998
Nonchan Noriben	CBC	February 3	anime	February 3, 1997 – March 28, 1997
Mach GoGoGo	TV Tokyo	January 9	anime	January 9, 1997 - September 25, 1997
Pocket Monsters	TV Tokyo	April 1	anime	April 1, 1997 – November 14, 2002
SASUKE	TBS	September 26	Variety	September 26, 1997 – present
Slayers Try	TV Tokyo	April 4	anime	April 4, 1997 – September 26, 1997
Ultraman Dyna	MBS	September 6	tokusatsu	September 6, 1997 – August 29, 1998
Yume no Crayon Oukoku	ABC	September 7	anime	September 7, 1997 – January 31, 1999

== Ongoing shows ==
- Music Fair, music (1964–present)
- Mito Koumon, jidaigeki (1969-2011)
- Sazae-san, anime (1969–present)
- FNS Music Festival, music (1974–present)
- Panel Quiz Attack 25, game show (1975–present)
- Doraemon, anime (1979-2005)
- Soreike! Anpanman, anime (1988–present)
- Downtown no Gaki no Tsukai ya Arahende!!, game show (1989–present)
- Crayon Shin-chan, anime (1992–present)
- Shima Shima Tora no Shimajirou, anime (1993-2008)
- Nintama Rantarou, anime (1993–present)
- Chibi Maruko-chan, anime (1995–present)
- Azuki-chan, anime (1995–1998)
- Kodomo no Omocha, anime (1996-1998)
- Kochira Katsushika-ku Kameari Kouen-mae Hashutsujo, anime (1996-2004)
- Rurouni Kenshin: Meiji Swordsman Romantic Story, anime (1996-1998)
- Detective Conan, anime (1996–present)

== Hiatus ==
Show	Station	Hiatus Date	Genre	Original Run
Pocket Monsters	TV Tokyo	December 16	anime	April 1, 1997 - December 16, 1997

== Endings ==
Show	Station	Ending Date	Genre	Original Run
B-Fighter Kabuto	TV Asahi	February 16	tokusatsu	March 3, 1996 – February 16, 1997
Brave Command Dagwon	Nagoya TV	January 25	anime	February 3, 1996 – January 25, 1997
Dragon Ball GT	Fuji TV	November 19	anime	February 7, 1996 - November 19, 1997
Gekisou Sentai Carranger	TV Asahi	February 7	tokusatsu	March 1, 1996 – February 7, 1997
Love Generation	Fuji TV	December 22	drama	October 13, 1997 - December 22, 1997
Mach GoGoGo	TV Tokyo	September 25	anime	January 9, 1997 - September 25, 1997
Sailor Moon	TV Asahi	February 8	anime	March 7, 1992 - February 8, 1997
Saber Marionette J	TV Tokyo	March 25	anime	October 1, 1996 - March 25, 1997
Slayers Try	TV Tokyo	September 26	anime	April 4, 1997 – September 26, 1997
Ultraman Tiga	MBS	August 30	tokusatsu	September 7, 1996 – August 30, 1997
You're Under Arrest	TBS	September 27	anime	October 5, 1996 - September 27, 1997

== See also ==
- 1997 in anime
- List of Japanese television dramas
- 1997 in Japan
- List of Japanese films of 1997
