= Mazinger Z =

1972 Japanese super robot manga series

- Cover of the first manga volume

マジンガーZ (Majingā Zetto)
- Genre: Super robot
- Manga
- Written by: Go Nagai
- Illustrated by: Go Nagai
- Published by: Shueisha; Kodansha
- Magazine: Weekly Shōnen Jump (1972–1973); TV Magazine (1973–1974)
- Original run: October 1972 – September 1974
- Volumes: 4 (Shueisha); 5 (Kodansha)
- Anime television series
- Music by: Michiaki Watanabe; Akira Ifukube (stock music)
- Studio: Toei Animation
- Licensed by: NA: Discotek Media
- Original network: FNS (Fuji TV)
- Original run: December 3, 1972 – September 1, 1974
- Episodes: 92
- Manga
- Written by: Go Nagai
- Illustrated by: Gosaku Ota
- Published by: Akita Shoten
- Magazine: Boken Oh
- Original run: December 1972 – September 1974
- Volumes: 5
- Sequels
- Great Mazinger (1974–1975); Mazinger Z: Infinity (2017 anime film)
- Other series
- List of all Mazinger series
- Video game
- Mazinger Z (1993)

Mazinger Z (Japanese: マジンガーZ, Hepburn: Majingā Zetto; known as Tranzor Z in the United States) is a Japanese super robot manga series written and illustrated by Go Nagai. It was originally serialized in Shueisha's Weekly Shōnen Jump from October 1972 to August 1973 and Kodansha's TV Magazine from October 1973 to September 1974.

Mazinger Z has since spawned a media franchise. It was adapted into an anime television series by Toei Animation, which aired on Fuji TV from December 1972 to September 1974. A second manga series was released alongside the TV show, this one drawn by Gosaku Ota, which started and ended almost at the same time as the TV show. The series was followed by several sequels and spin-off, among them being Great Mazinger, UFO Robot Grendizer, and Mazinkaiser. Mazinger Z: Infinity, a theatrical film sequel, taking place ten years after the Great Mazinger series, was animated by Toei Animation and released in theaters on January 13, 2018.

Although not exactly the first mecha anime in history, the series has often been cited as being the first modern one.

== Plot ==
Mazinger Z is an enormous super robot, constructed with a fictional metal called Super-Alloy Z (超合金Z, Chōgōkin Zetto), which is forged from a new element (Japanium) mined from a reservoir found only in the sediment of Mt. Fuji, in Japan. Professor Juzo Kabuto built the mecha as a secret weapon against the forces of evil, represented in the series by the Mechanical Beasts of Dr. Hell. The latter was the German member of a Japanese archeological team that discovered ruins of a lost pre-Grecian civilization on an island named Bardos, the Mycéne Empire. One of their findings was that the Mycene used an army of steel titans about 20 meters in height. Finding prototypes of those titans underground that could be remote-controlled and realizing their immense power on the battlefield, Dr. Hell goes insane and kills all the other scientists on his research team except for Professor Kabuto, who manages to escape. The lone survivor goes back to Japan and attempts to warn the world of its imminent danger. Meanwhile, Dr. Hell establishes his headquarters on a mobile island, forms the new Underground Empire, and plans to use the Mechanical Monsters to become the new ruler of the world. To counter this, Kabuto constructs Mazinger Z and manages to finish it just before being killed by a bomb planted by Hell's right-hand person, Baron Ashura, a half-man, half-woman. As he lies dying, he manages to inform his grandson Koji Kabuto about the robot and its use. Koji becomes the robot's pilot and, from that point on, battles both the continuous mechanical monsters and the sinister henchmen sent by Doctor Hell.

The anime culminated in the destruction of the original robot by new enemies (after Doctor Hell's final defeat in the penultimate episode) and the immediate introduction of its successor, Great Mazinger, an improved version of Mazinger, along with its pilot, Tetsuya Tsurugi.

== Development ==
In his Manga Works series, Go Nagai reveals that he had always loved Astro Boy and Tetsujin-28 as a child and wanted to make his own robot anime. However, for the longest time he was unable to produce a concept that he felt did not borrow too heavily from those two shows. One day, Nagai observed a traffic jam and mused to himself that the drivers in the back of the traffic jam would love a way to bypass the cars in front of them. From that thought came the idea of a giant robot that could be controlled from the inside, like a car. In its original concept, the Mazinger Z robot was named Energer Z and was controlled by a motorcycle that was driven up its back and into its head, an idea which was recycled for the Diana A robot. However, the recent popularity of Kamen Rider, in which the main characters frequently drive motorcycles, led to Nagai replacing the motorcycle with a hovercraft to make Mazinger Z stand out. Nagai later redesigned Energer Z, renaming it Mazinger Z as a play on the Japanese words ma (魔, demon) and jin (神, god).

The motif of the Hover Pilder docking itself into Mazinger's head also borrows from Nagai's 1971 manga Demon Lord Dante (the prototype for his more popular Devilman), in which the titular giant demon has a human head (of Ryo Utsugi, the young man who merged with him) in his forehead. Koji Kabuto takes his surname (the Japanese word for a helmet) because he controls Mazinger Z from its head.

== Media ==
=== Manga ===
Mazinger Z is written and illustrated by Go Nagai. It began serialization in Weekly Shōnen Jump in October 1972. While the manga was being published in Weekly Shōnen Jump, Go Nagai made an agreement with Kodansha to have Mazinger Z also be published in TV Magazine, in an effort to reach a younger audience. After Tadasu Nagano, the editor-in-chief of Weekly Shōnen Jump, heard of this agreement, it was announced that the serialization of Mazinger Z in Weekly Shōnen Jump would be discontinued, as Shueisha thought it unacceptable to serialize the same manga as a rival company. The serialization of the manga in Weekly Shōnen Jump ended in August 1973, and it was serialized in TV Magazine from October 1973 to September 1974. The manga was collected into four tankōbon volumes by Shueisha in 1973 and five tankōbon volumes by Kodansha in 1975 and 1976. The manga was also collected into five tankōbon volumes by Asahi Sonorama in 1974, four volumes by Chuokoron-Shinsha in 1994 and 1995, and three volumes by Daitosha in 1996.

=== Anime ===
An anime adaption of Mazinger Z was produced by Dynamic Planning and Toei Animation, with Toei handling the animation. The series ran for a total of 92 episodes from December 3, 1972, to September 1, 1974.

In the 1980s, on behalf of Dynamic Planning, Masami Ōbari and other independent animators (Toshiki Hirano) not part of Toei Animation began work on a miniseries of Mazinger Z. The OVA (Original Video Animation) would have been called Dai-Mazinger (大魔神我, Daimajinga) and would have presented the same characters known to the general public, starting with the main protagonist Koji. The robot would be more realistic: for example, it would have exhaust pipes, and its rocket fists would not be able to return to its arms automatically.

The news, initially protected by tight secrecy, managed to leak and was spread by the specialized press. Toei protested, saying to Dynamic that the rights of the animation of Mazinger was only theirs and that they did not tolerate a Mazinger animated by others. As a consequence, the Daimajinga project was blocked. This wasn't helped by the fact that Nagai was in the middle of a court battle with Toei, suing them for not properly crediting him and not paying him royalties over the creation of Gaiking in 1976. However, since then, the relationship between Nagai and Toei has steadily improved.

==== International release ====
In 1976, Honolulu-based entertainment concern, Consolidated Amusement Co., licensed the first 52 episodes of the series from Toei, as reported by the Honolulu Star-Bulletin, and commissioned M&M Communications, a local sound studio, to produce an English language dub. Consolidated, which ran four of the biggest theater chains in Hawaii, packaged the episodes of Mazinger Z for weekend kiddie matinee screenings in their venues, starting with a big promotional push over Thanksgiving weekend (November 27 & 28) that same year with a "personal appearance" (a 10' electronic model) at the Pearlridge Shopping Center, as promoted in the Honolulu Advertiser. The first package of episodes debuted at the Pearlridge 4-Plex Theaters on Saturday, December 4, 1976 (according to the Honolulu Star-Bulletin). Unlike other English adaptations of various anime series at the time, Mazinger Z was left with its plot and character names unaltered. This English dub also aired in the Philippines; it proved so popular there that additional episodes were locally dubbed.

There have been some claims that Frontier Enterprises produced an English dub Mazinger Z at some point in the 1970s, stating it was one of the serial works that his company Frontier Enterprises had been in charge of translating but failed to sell to a network and thus never aired or was released.

The series partially aired in Spain on TVE 1 at the same time. Rumors emerged that the series was pulled from broadcast because it reportedly induced violence to an underage viewer, but according to Claudio Biern Boyd in a 2021 interview, nothing happened at all.

Discotek Media acquired the American home video rights to the show. The result was a release of all 92 episodes of the original series in 2 volumes: Mazinger Z TV Series Vol 1, Ep. 1–46 and Mazinger Z TV Series Vol 2, Ep. 47–92. Discotek Media later released a double feature DVD on April 29, 2014.

==== Tranzor Z ====
In the United States, Three B. Productions Ltd., a production company headed by Bunker Jenkins, developed Mazinger Z for American television by producing an English-dubbed version, which Jenkins retitled Tranzor Z. This adaptation aired in 1985 and was, like many English-dubbed anime shows that were on American TV at the time, re-edited for American audiences. Many of the Japanese names used in Mazinger Z were changed for its adaptation into Tranzor Z; for example, Koji Kabuto became Tommy Davis, Sayaka Yumi became Jessica Wells, Shiro became Toad, Professor Yumi became Dr. Wells, Dr. Hell became Dr. Demon, Baron Ashura became Devleen, Count Brocken became Count DeCapito, and Archduke Gorgon became Genghis the Ghastly. Only 65 out of the 92 episodes were dubbed into English, as 65 was the minimum number of episodes required for syndication. The final episode was not dubbed in English, instead the series ended with the defeat of Dr. Demon. The fate of Genghis was left up in the air.

=== Films ===
The shows spawned so-called "team-up movies" early on, which were like longer episodes that teamed up Mazinger Z with one of Go Nagai's other creations, as in Mazinger Z vs. Devilman in 1973 as well as Mazinger Z Vs. Dr. Hell and Mazinger Z Vs. The Great General of Darkness both released in 1974.

On the franchise's 45th anniversary, a sequel film titled Mazinger Z: Infinity was announced, taking place ten years after the events of the original series. It was released theatrically in Japan on January 13, 2018.

=== Video games ===
Mazinger has also been successful in the video game area (at least in Japan) as one of the main stars in the acclaimed battle simulation game series Super Robot Wars, released by Banpresto, featuring characters and units from almost all Mazinger-related shows, alongside other anime franchises. In 1994, Banpresto released an arcade game called, Mazinger Z, which is a vertical shoot 'em up with three selectable characters: Mazinger Z, Great Mazinger, and Grendizer. Announced on December 3, 2022, by Hamster Corporation, Mazinger Z was eventually included in the Arcade Archives series on May 11, 2023, for the Nintendo Switch and PlayStation 4. The Sega Genesis title, Mazin Saga: Mutant Fighter, was released by Sega in 1993. It can be played in two different ways: one as a side-scroller, and the other as a one-on-one fighting game.

== Merchandise ==
Mazinger spawned many products in the realm of merchandising, model kits, plastic and die-cast metal toys (the Soul of Chogokin line), action figures and other collectibles.

A 40-foot tall statue of Mazinger Z was built in a suburb called "Mas del Plata" in Tarragona (Catalonia, Spain) in the early 1980s, to serve as the suburb's entrance; the suburb was never completed, but the statue remains there.

== Reception and influence ==
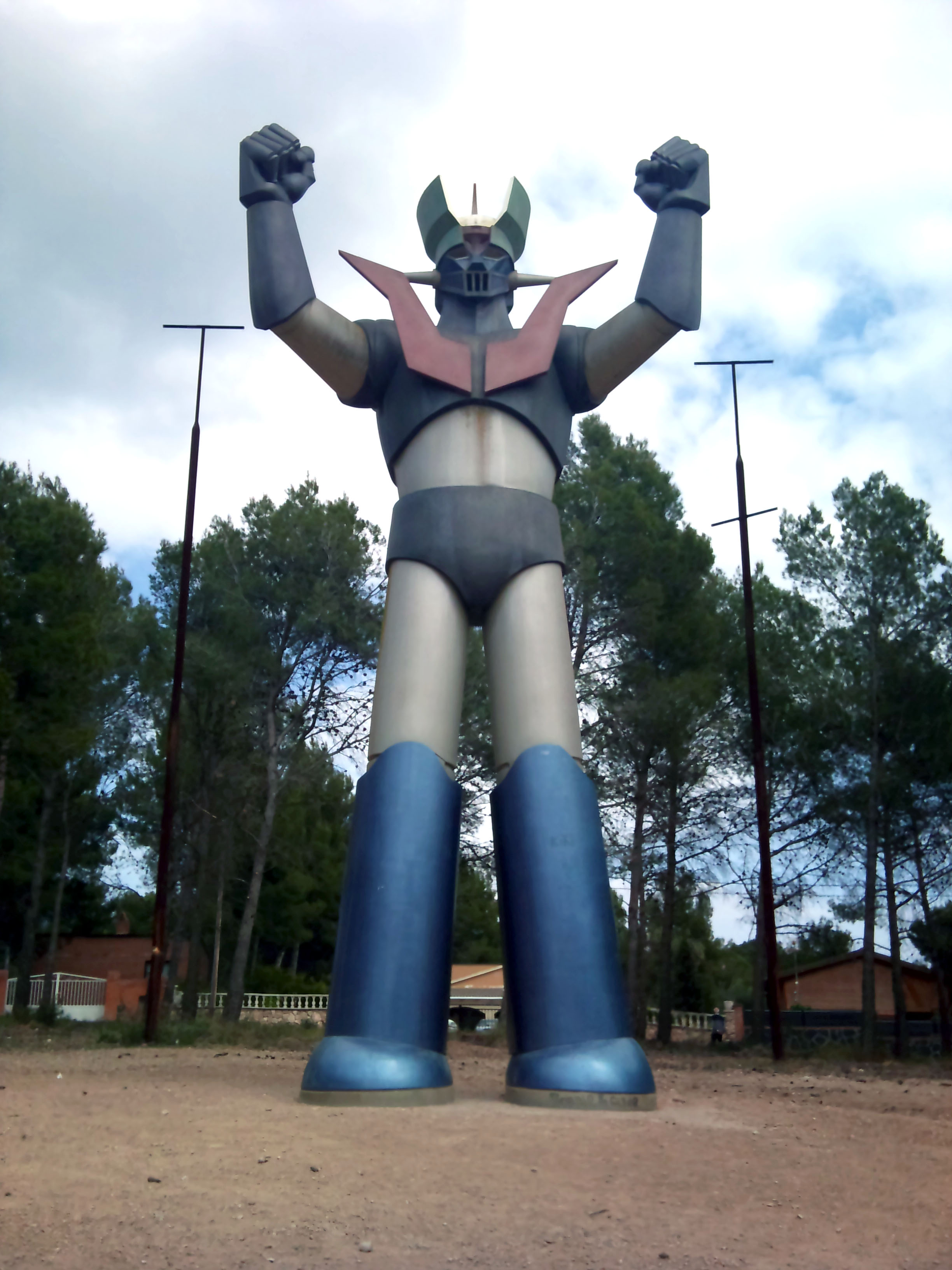
Mazinger Z sculpture in the Mas del Plata urbanization, in Cabra del Camp, Catalonia, Spain

The Mazinger Z anime consistently achieved high audience ratings while it was airing. Its period of greatest popularity lasted from roughly October 1973 to March 1974, during which time it regularly scored audience ratings in the high twenties. Episode 68, broadcast March 17, 1974, achieved the series' highest rating of 30.4%, making Mazinger Z one of the highest-rated anime series of all time.

Mazinger Z helped to create the 1970s boom in mecha anime. The series is noteworthy for introducing many of the accepted stock features of super robot anime genres, including the first occurrence of mecha robots being piloted by a user from within a cockpit.

Since the franchise was so popular in South Korea, they made their own version inspired by the trilogy under the name of Robot Taekwon V which turned out to be a massive hit in Korea and spread endless popularity and several other knock-offs such as Super Mazinger 3, etc.

In 2001, the Japanese magazine Animage elected Mazinger Z TV series the eleventh best anime production of all time. TV Asahi ran a series of four polls in 2005 and 2006 to determine Japan's 100 favorite anime, in which Mazinger Z placed 91st twice and 98th once.

Guillermo del Toro has cited the show—which was a huge success in his native Mexico during the 1980s—as an important influence on Pacific Rim.

As of July 2023, Mazinger Z has reached a total of 20 million copies in circulation worldwide.

== See also ==
- Daimajin
- Devilman
- Getter Robo
- Ichirou Mizuki
