= Kōichi Kawakita =

Japanese film director

- 川北 紘一
- Kawakita in 2011
- Born: December 5, 1942; Nihonbashi, Chuo, Tokyo, Japan
- Died: December 5, 2014 (aged 72)
- Occupation: Special effects director
- Years active: 1960 - 2014

Kōichi Kawakita (川北 紘一, Kawakita Kōichi; December 5, 1942 – December 5, 2014) was a Japanese special effects director, cinematographer, and optical photographer.

== Filmography ==
=== Director ===
- Monster Planet of Godzilla (1994)
- The God of Clay (2011)

=== Special effects director ===
- Ultraman Ace (1972-1973)
- Ultraman Taro (1973-1974)
- Ultraman 80 (1980-1981)
- Sayonara Jupiter (1984)
- Gunhed (1989)
- Godzilla vs. Biollante (1989)
- Godzilla vs. King Ghidorah (1991)
- Godzilla vs. Mothra (1992)
- Godzilla vs. Mechagodzilla II (1993)
- Godzilla vs. SpaceGodzilla (1994)
- Yamato Takeru (1994)
- Godzilla vs. Destoroyah (1995)
- Rebirth of Mothra (1996)
- Rebirth of Mothra II (1997)
- Chouseishin Series (2003-2006)
- Chouseishin Gransazer (2003-2004)
- Genseishin Justirisers (2004-2005)
- Chousei Kantai Sazer-X (2005-2006)

=== Special effects assistant director ===
- Godzilla vs. Hedorah (1971)
- Godzilla vs. Mechagodzilla (1974)
- The War in Space (1977)
- The Mighty Peking Man (1977)

=== Actor ===
- Godzilla vs. Hedorah (1971) - Bar Patron (uncredited)
- Godzilla vs. King Ghidorah (1991) - Underground shopping center patron (uncredited)
- Godzilla vs. Mechagodzilla II (1993) - Rodan hand puppet (uncredited)
- Godzilla, Mothra and King Ghidorah: Giant Monsters All-Out Attack (2001) - Minor Role (SDF officer) (final film role)
