= Mazinger Z (1993 video game) =

1993 video game

- Cover art
- Developer(s): Winkysoft
- Publisher(s): Bandai
- Composer(s): Shinichi Tanaka
- Platform(s): Super Famicom
- Release: JP: June 25, 1993
- Genre(s): Action, platformer
- Mode(s): Single-player

Mazinger Z (マジンガーZ) is 1993 action platformer video game developed by Winkysoft and published by Bandai for the Super Famicom exclusively in Japan. It is based on the manga of the same name by Go Nagai.

== Gameplay ==
Mazinger Z is a side-scrolling, action platformer.

== Development and release ==
Mazinger Z was developed by Winkysoft, which had previously featured the franchise in early entries of the Super Robot Wars series on other Nintendo consoles. The game was released exclusively in Japan by Bandai on June 25, 1993.

== Reception ==
The Japanese magazine Famitsu gave it a score of 17 out of 40 while the Italian magazine Computer+Videogiochi gave it a score of 92%.
