= Saki Kagami =

Japanese actress

- 加賀美早紀
- Born: February 26, 1985 (age 41); Sakura, Chiba, Japan
- Occupation: Actress
- Years active: 2001–2011; 2023-present
- Height: 161 cm (5 ft 3 in)

Saki Kagami (加賀美早紀, Kagami Saki; born February 26, 1985) is a Japanese actress. Her acting career began in early 2001, when she was cast for the lead role in the movie Platonic Sex among 12,083 applicants. Now she is probably best known for roles in various TV Dramas and tokusatsu shows such as Ultraseven X and Kamen Rider Kiva. She was represented by Watanabe Entertainment.

== Biography ==
In July 2011, she retired from show business, citing stress and a desire to resume a normal life as reasons for her decision.

As of 2023, Saki has returned to acting.

== Filmography ==
=== Television ===
- Aibou season 22 (TV Asahi, 2023) as Yumi Yazaki (ep. 7)
- Kamen Rider Kiva (TV Asahi, 2008) as Maya/Queen/Pearlshell Fangire (1986 Timeline)
- Keishicho Sosa Ikka 9 Gakari 3 (TV Asahi, 2008) as Natsuki
- Mikon Six Sisters 2 (CBC/TBS, 2008) as Hitoshi Atsushi (6th sister)
- Ultraseven X (CBC/TBS, 2007) as Saeki Elea
- Keishicho Sosa Ikka 9 Gakari 2 (TV Asahi, 2007) as Natsuki
- Mikon Six Sisters (CBC/TBS, 2006) as Hitoshi Atsushi (6th sister)
- Shin Ningen Kosaten (NHK, 2006) as a bad girl
- Kekkon Dekinai Otoko (Fuji TV, 2006, ep4) as a guest in ep. 4
- Oniyome Nikki (Fuji TV, 2005) as Nakagawa Yuki
- Daisuki! Itsutsugo (TBS, 2004) as Nakagawa Kaori
- Fantasma - Noroi no Yakata (TV Tokyo, 2004) as Asakura Yuka
- Hagure Keiji Junjoha (TV Asahi, 2003)
- Kyohansha (NTV, 2003)
- Dobutsu no Oisha-san (TV Asahi, 2003) as Shimada Sayo
- Sky High (TV Asahi, 2003) as a guest in ep. 2
- Tokyo Niwatsuki Ikkodate (NTV, 2002)

=== Films ===
- Girls life's (2009) as Miki
- Tenshi no Koi (2009) as Naoko
- Prisoner No. 07: Reina (JOSHÛ: 07-GÔ REINA) (2006)
- Ori Nyosho Reika Shukan (2006)
- Satsujinbachi - kirâ bî (Killer Bee) (2005)
- Platonic Sex (2001) as Kadokura Aoi

== Discography ==
- "Rainy Rose (Queen Edit.)" as Maya/Queen/Pearlshell Fangire (1986 Timeline), 2009
