= Ultraseven X =

2007 Japanese television series

- Title card
- Genre: Tokusatsu; Superhero; Science fiction Cyberpunk; Horror Fiction
- Created by: Tsuburaya Productions
- Developed by: Yūji Kobayashi
- Directed by: Takeshi Yagi
- Starring: Eriku Yoza; Saki Kagami; Tomohito Wakizaki; Anri Ban
- Country of origin: Japan
- Original language: Japanese
- No. of episodes: 12

Production
- Executive producer: Kazuo Tsuburaya
- Production companies: Tsuburaya Productions; Chubu-Nippon Broadcasting

Original release
- Network: CBC, TBS
- Release: October 5 – December 21, 2007

Related
- Ultraman Mebius; Ultra Galaxy Mega Monster Battle

Ultraseven X (ウルトラセブン エックス, Urutorasebun Ekkusu; stylized as U7X) is the 16th entry (22nd overall) in the Tsuburaya's long-running Ultra Series. It is a revival of the 1967 series Ultraseven, and is the second in Tsuburaya Productions' Ultra hero series to be exclusively for an adult audience after Ultraman Nexus and the first to be in a wide screen high-definition format. The show first aired on October 5, 2007 at 2:15 am on CBC and 2:25 am on TBS.

On May 11, 2017, Toku announced that the series would air in the United States on its channel with English subtitles beginning June 5 until June 12, 2017. On Friday, September 29 the entire series was made available for viewing on Verizon's go90.

== Plot ==
The series took place in a world where all forms of war and terrorism had long ended, bringing forth a dystopian future. An amnesiac man named Jin awakened and was entrusted with missions given by DEUS to fight against aliens that had slipped into the human society, joining forces with agents K and S. During that moment, he was given a pair of glasses by Elea Saeki to transform into the red giant. While fighting to preserve the safety of the city, Jin becomes closer to discovering his memories.

Near the end of the series, Jin, K, and S discover that their world is silently ruled by an alien race through subjugating mankind into a state of utopia. While on the run from DEUS agents, Jin discovered that he was bonded to Ultraseven, the red giant from another world to stop the aliens from invading his home dimension. When Seven reawakened, he quickly destroyed the entire alien race and saved Jin's comrades from a suicide bombing attack. Jin was separated from Seven as the latter returned to his world as Dan Moroboshi, reuniting with his lover Anne.

== Characters ==
=== DEUS ===
DEUS (ＤＥＵＳ(デウス), Deusu) is the special investigative team organized in order to defend the Earth against alien invaders. Although they live as normal people, members of DEUS can be called into action at any given time. Agents call each other by code name rather than their actual names. Led by the Commander of DEUS (ＤＥＵＳ(デウス)司令, Deusu Shirei), he informs agents of their missions through the VC. It is revealed to be an A.I. that controls all of the world's information on behalf of the shadow rulers. The known agents of DEUS are:

- Jin: See here
- K: He is an agent of DEUS and executes missions with Jin. He is 25 years old.
- S: She is an agent of DEUS and focuses on undercover missions. She eats chocolate frequently. She is 25 years old.
- R: Aiding a flying saucer responsible for kidnapping people who felt that their life was worthless, he eventually wanted to be taken away by it too, but was killed when a beam was fired onto him by it, leaving a burning ground.
- D: An agent who fell in love with a female alien who was supposed to gather information preparing for an invasion, he did all he could to protect her. He also taught her to play the guitar, which she fell in love with as she loved the music from it. He pretended to have been killed by a flash of light during a mission with S, in order to disappear to spend time with his lover.

Arsenal

- VC (Video-Ceiver) (ＶＣ（ビデオシーバー）, Buishī (Bideo Shībā)): A multipurpose wristwatch-like communicator which can also function as a GPS, deploying an electromagnetic barrier and anti-gravity to survive a fall from a skyscraper.
- Ultra Gun (ウルトラガン, Urutora Gan): A small laser gun customized for anti-aliens carried by agents. It shares its name with the standard weaponry of Ultra Guard from Ultraseven, but different in terms of model, which illustrated to portray a near-futuristic design.

=== Aqua Project ===
The Aqua Project is a top secret project conducted by the government. It is supposed to convert energy in water into atomic energy. When it was found to open a portal into a parallel universe, the project was halted. However, it was restarted by the shadow rulers in an attempt to invade the parallel universe. Members of the project then found out about the shadow rulers, and were all killed, except for one:

- Elea Saeki: An employee in the Science Department, she was part of the Aqua Project, a top secret project by the government. After coming close to finding out the real identity of the shadow rulers, she and Jin were pursued by DEUS agents. When they fell into Lake Nousu trying to escape the agents, she was contacted by Ultraseven and gave permission to him to "become one" with Jin. When Jin awoke, she handed the Ultra Eye to him so that he can transform into Ultraseven. She is 22 years old.

== List of episodes ==
No.	Title	Directed by	Written by	Aliens	Original release date	English release date
1	"DREAM"	Takeshi Yagi	Yūji Kobayashi	Galkimes, the Space-Time Life Form (時空生命体 ガルキメス, Jikū Seimeitai Garukimesu)	October 5, 2007	June 5, 2017
2	"CODE NAME“R”"	Takeshi Yagi	Ai Ōta	N/A	October 12, 2007	June 5, 2017
3	"HOPELESS"	Kenji Suzuki	Takuro Fukuda	Alien Markind (マーキンド星人, Mākindo Seijin)	October 19, 2007	June 6, 2017
4	"DIAMOND“S”"	Kenji Suzuki	Ai Ōta	Peginera, the Exobiological Parasite (パラサイト宇宙生物 ペジネラ, Parasaito Uchū Seibutsu Pejinera)	October 26, 2007	June 6, 2017
5	"PEACE MAKER"	Kenji Suzuki	Jiro Kaneko	Vo-Da, the Violent Alien (凶暴エイリアン ボーダ星人, Kyōbō Eirian Bōda Seijin); Alien Chamuda (チャムダ星人, Chamuda Seijin)	November 2, 2007	June 7, 2017
6	"TRAVELER"	Kengo Kaji	Yūji Kobayashi	N/A	November 9, 2007	June 7, 2017
7	"YOUR SONG"	Kengo Kaji	Sotaro Hayashi	Alien Vairo (ヴァイロ星人, Vairo Seijin); Vadoryudo, the Mechanical Biological Weapon (生物機械兵器 バドリュード, Seibutsu Kikai Heiki Badoryūdo)	November 16, 2007	June 8, 2017
8	"BLOOD MESSAGE"	Kazuya Konaka	Keiichi Hasegawa	Hupnath, the Carnage Spaceman (殺戮宇宙人 ヒュプナス, Satsuriku Uchūjin Hyupunasu)	November 23, 2007	June 8, 2017
9	"RED MOON"	Takeshi Yagi	Ai Ōta	Jyuujin (獣人, Jūjin)	November 30, 2007	June 9, 2017
10	"MEMORIES"	Kazuya Konaka	Yūji Kobayashi	N/A	December 7, 2007	June 9, 2017
11	"AQUA PROJECT"	Takeshi Yagi	Yūji Kobayashi	N/A	December 14, 2007	June 12, 2017
12	"NEW WORLD"	Takeshi Yagi	Yūji Kobayashi	Mecha-Graykess, the Giant Mechanical Life Form (巨大機械生命体 メカ・グラキエス, Kyodai Kikai Seimeitai Meka Gurakiesu)	December 21, 2007	June 12, 2017

== Cast ==
- Jin (ジン): Eriku Yoza (与座 重理久, Yoza Eriku)
- Elea Saeki (冴木 エレア, Saeki Erea): Saki Kagami (加賀美 早紀, Kagami Saki)
- K (ケイ, Kei): Tomohito Wakizaki (脇崎 智史, Wakizaki Tomohito)
- S (エス, Esu): Anri Ban (伴 杏里, Ban Anri)
- Newscaster of Government Broadcasting (政府放送のキャスター, Seifu Hōsō no Kyasutā): Kenichi Miyamoto (宮本 賢一, Miyamoto Ken'ichi), Yoko Azami (莇 陽子, Azami Yōko)

=== Voice cast ===
- Commander of DEUS (ＤＥＵＳ（デウス）司令, Deusu Shirei): Yosuke Natsuki (夏木 陽介, Natsuki Yōsuke)

=== Guest cast ===
- Leader of Alien Group (エイリアン集団の首領, Eirian Shūdan no Shuryō; 1): Akira Otani (大谷 朗, Ōtani Akira)
- Lady Executive of Alien Group (エイリアン集団の女性幹部, Eirian Shūdan no Josei Kanbu; 1): MiWa
- Rulers (支配者, Shihaisha; 1, 10–12): Masahiro Noguchi (野口 雅弘, Noguchi Masahiro), Seiki Chiba (千葉 誠樹, Chiba Seiki), Michiko Nakayama (ナカヤマ ミチコ, Nakayama Michiko)
- Eriko (エリコ, 2): Tomomi Miyashita (宮下 ともみ, Tomomi Miyashita)
- R (アール, Āru; 2): Toshiyuki Watarai (渡来 敏之, Watarai Toshiyuki)
- Tamaru/Alien Markind (タマル／マーキンド星人, Tamaru/Mākindo Seijin; 3): Takayasu Komiya (小宮 孝泰, Komiya Takayasu)
- Tazaki (田崎; 4): Edo Yamaguchi (エド 山口, Edo Yamaguchi)
- Yamane (山根; 4): Tsutomu Okabe (岡部 務, Okabe Tsutomu)
- Slender Man/Alien Chamuda (細身の男／チャムダ星人, Hosomi no Otoko/Chamuda Seijin; 5): Kenji Yabe (やべ けんじ, Yabe Kenji)
- Takao (タカオ; 6): Mitsuru Karahashi (唐橋 充, Karahashi Mitsuru)
- Alisa (アリサ; 6): Nao Oikawa (及川 奈央, Oikawa Nao)
- Soul of Light (光の魂, Hikari no Tamashii; Voice; 6): Asami Imai (今井 麻美, Imai Asami)
- Nataru (ナタル, Nataru; 7): Saaya Ishikawa (石川 紗彩, Ishikawa Saaya)
- D (ディー, Dī; 7): Ryohei Odai (小田井 涼平, Odai Ryōhei)
- Street Singer (ストリートシンガー, Sutorīto Shingā; 7): Hiroko Ebioka (海老岡 宏子, Ebioka Hiroko)
- Kyosuke Agata/Hupnath (アガタ･キョウスケ／ヒュプナス, Agata Kyōsuke/Hyupunasu; 8): Yuuki Kuroda (黒田 勇樹, Kuroda Yūki)
- Asami Agata (アガタ･アサミ, Agata Asami; 8): Yukie Kawamura (川村 ゆきえ, Kawamura Yukie)
- Sameo (サメオ; 8): Yuki Ito (伊藤 友樹, Itō Yūki)
- Ogata/Saku (尾形／朔; 9): Hassei Takano (高野 八誠, Takano Hassei)
- Mahiru (まひる; 9): Kaori Nakamura (中村 果生莉, Nakamura Kaori)
- Nozomu/Jyuujin (望／獣人, Nozomu/Jūjin; 9): Hiro Ogasawara (小笠原 宙, Ogasawara Hiro)
- Professor Shikishima (敷島教授, Shikishima Kyōju; 9): Masami Horiuchi (堀内 正美, Horiuchi Masami)
- Saki (サキ; 10): Shion Nakamaru (中丸 シオン, Nakamaru Shion)
- Haibara (ハイバラ; 10): Ryuki Kitaoka (北岡 龍貴, Kitaoka Ryūki)
- Anne Yuri (友里 アンヌ, Yuri Annu; 12): Yuriko Hishimi (ひし美 ゆり子, Hishimi Yuriko)
- Dan Moroboshi (モロボシ･ダン, Moroboshi Dan; 12): Kohji Moritsugu (森次 晃嗣, Moritsugu Kōji)

== Post-release ==
=== Novelization ===
A novel series of Ultraseven X was released and published in Hobby Japan.

== Home media ==
In July 2020, Shout! Factory announced to have struck a multi-year deal with Alliance Entertainment and Mill Creek, with the blessings of Tsuburaya and Indigo, that granted them the exclusive SVOD and AVOD digital rights to the Ultra series and films (1,100 TV episodes and 20 films) acquired by Mill Creek the previous year. Ultraseven X, amongst other titles, will stream in the United States and Canada through Shout! Factory TV and Tokushoutsu.

== Songs ==
Main theme

- "Another day comes"
  - Lyrics: K
  - Composition and Artist: Pay Money to My Pain
