= Megumi Kobayashi =

Japanese model, actress, and singer

- Born: April 24, 1977 (age 49); Ōdate, Akita Prefecture, Japan
- Occupation: Actress

Megumi Kobayashi (小林恵, Kobayashi Megumi; born April 24, 1977) is a Japanese model, actress, and singer under A-team Production.

Kobayashi was born in Ōdate, Akita Prefecture. She up in Yokohama, Kanagawa Prefecture, from elementary school onwards. In 2006, she debuted as a jazz singer under the name Meg.

== Filmography ==
- Rebirth of Mothra
- Rebirth of Mothra II
- Rebirth of Mothra III
- Gamera the Brave
- Hoshi 35
