= Hatake =

Hatake is a surname. Notable people with the surname include:

- Kakashi Hatake, fictional character
- Seishu Hatake (born 1994), Japanese baseball player
