= Rebirth of Mothra II =

1997 film by Kunio Miyoshi

- Theatrical release poster

Japanese name
- Kanji: モスラ2 海底の大決戦
Transcriptions
- Revised Hepburn: Mosura Tsū Kaitei no Daikessen
- Directed by: Kunio Miyoshi
- Written by: Masumi Suetani; Tomoyuki Tanaka (Story)
- Produced by: Hiroaki Kitayama; Shōgo Tomiyama
- Starring: Sayaka Yamaguchi; Megumi Kobayashi; Aki Hano; Shimada Maganao; Maho Nonami
- Cinematography: Yoshinori Sekiguchi
- Music by: Toshiyuki Watanabe
- Production company: Toho Pictures
- Distributed by: Toho
- Release date: December 13, 1997
- Running time: 98 minutes
- Country: Japan
- Language: Japanese
- Budget: ¥1 billion
- Box office: $7,000,000

Rebirth of Mothra II (モスラ2 海底の大決戦, Mosura Tsū Kaitei no Daikessen; released in Japan as Mothra 2: The Battle Under the Deep Sea) is a 1997 Japanese kaiju film directed by Kunio Miyoshi, written by Masumi Suetani, and produced by Hiroaki Kitayama and Shōgo Tomiyama. Produced by Toho Pictures and distributed by Toho, the film features the fictional monster character Mothra, and is the second film in the Rebirth of Mothra trilogy, following the previous year's Rebirth of Mothra.

Rebirth of Mothra II stars Sayaka Yamaguchi, Megumi Kobayashi, Aki Hano, and Hikari Mitsushima, and was the final tokusatsu film to feature special effects directed by Koichi Kawakita. The film was released in Japan on December 13, 1997.

It was followed by Rebirth of Mothra III (1998).

== Plot ==
As Japan's coasts are ravaged by poisonous starfish-like creatures called Barem, the Elias sisters, Moll and Lora, survey the destruction and enlist the help of three children who had discovered and befriended a strange little creature dubbed "Ghogo" to help find the mysterious treasure of Nirai Kanai, an ancient lost civilization, to save Earth.

Along the way, the Elias tell the children the source of the Barem is a monster called Dagahra, which Nirai Kanai created to manage pollution, before it went rogue. Their ally, Mothra, is able to defeat it, but she will need to reach Nirai Kanai's lost castle and find the civilization's treasure first. Meanwhile, the Elias' vengeful sister, Belvera, manipulates two fishermen to help her get the treasure before her sisters do, wanting it for herself for her diabolical plans. Both parties journey to the castle, which rises from underneath the ocean upon their arrival. Awakened by increased pollution levels, Dagahra releases a swarm of Barem, killing numerous forms of sea life. Moll and Lora call Mothra, who nearly succeeds in defeating Dagahra until the sea monster takes the battle underwater and incapacitates her with more Barem. Mothra lands on the newly raised Nirai Kanai temple, but before Dagahra can kill her, the structure activates and defends Mothra. Repelled, Dagahra goes on a rampage.

Entering the temple, Moll, Lora, and the children attempt to find the treasure while Belvera and her thralls try to thwart their mission. In the process, the latter group inadvertently unlock a gateway and awaken the princess of Nirai Kanai, who tells the Elias sisters that Earth must be protected and saved, the children are the hope of future generations, and reveals Ghogo is the lost treasure.

Moll and Lora use Ghogo's energy to revive Mothra and transform her into Rainbow Mothra, allowing her to destroy the Barem covering her body before reengaging Dagahra in combat. Though the latter retreats into the sea, Rainbow Mothra transforms further into Aqua Mothra and uses her new powers to destroy Dagahra and the Barem, saving Earth. As the temple starts to collapse, Moll and Lora fly to safety on their pet miniature Mothra, Fairy, while Belvera relinquishes control of the fishermen, who help the children escape. The princess takes Dagahra's body into the temple before lowering it back into the sea.

== Cast ==
- Sayaka Yamaguchi as Lora
- Megumi Kobayashi as Moll
- Aki Hano as Belvera
- Hikari Mitsushima as Shiori Uchiura / Little Girl
- Masaki Otake as Kohei Toguchi
- Shimada Maganao as Yoji Miyagi
- Atsushi Okuno as Fisherman #1
- Hajime Okayama as Fisherman #2
- Nonami Maho as Yuna
- Mizuho Yoshida as Dagahra

== Release ==
=== Home media ===
The film was released on DVD by Sony Pictures on February 1, 2000 and on Blu-ray by Sony, as part of the Toho Godzilla Collection, with all 3 Rebirth of Mothra films in September 2014.
