= Rebirth of Mothra =

1996 film by Okihiro Yoneda

- Theatrical release poster

Japanese name
- Kanji: モスラ
Transcriptions
- Revised Hepburn: Mosura
- Directed by: Okihiro Yoneda
- Screenplay by: Masumi Suetani
- Story by: Tomoyuki Tanaka
- Produced by: Hiroaki Kitayama
- Starring: Megumi Kobayashi; Sayaka Yamaguchi; Aki Hano; Kazuki Futami
- Cinematography: Yoshinori Sekiguchi
- Edited by: Nobuo Ogawa
- Music by: Toshiyuki Watanabe
- Production company: Toho Pictures
- Distributed by: Toho
- Release date: December 14, 1996 (Japan)
- Running time: 106 minutes
- Country: Japan
- Language: Japanese
- Budget: ¥1 billion
- Box office: ¥1.96 billion

Rebirth of Mothra, released in Japan simply as Mothra (モスラ, Mosura) is a 1996 Japanese kaiju film directed by Okihiro Yoneda, with special effects by Kōichi Kawakita. Produced and distributed by Toho Co., Ltd, the film serves as a reboot for the fictional giant monster character Mothra, and is the first installment in the Rebirth of Mothra trilogy. It was the final kaiju film produced under the supervision of Tomoyuki Tanaka, who produced such films as the original Mothra, which was released in 1961, as well as every film in the Godzilla franchise up to this point. He died of a stroke several months after the film's release.

Rebirth of Mothra stars Sayaka Yamaguchi, Megumi Kobayashi, Aki Hano, and Kazuki Futami. It was released theatrically in Japan on December 14, 1996. In "Rebirth of Mothra" the offspring of Mothra, referred to in song as "Mothra Leo," is the first major male Mothra in the franchise. It was followed in 1997 by Rebirth of Mothra II.

== Plot ==
Millions of years prior, a giant three-headed space dragon called Desghidorah arrives on Earth and battles a species of enormous and highly advanced moths who serve as protectors of the "Elias", a race of tiny, humanoid beings. After the battle, Desghidorah is defeated and sealed under the Earth while three Elias, the benevolent Moll and Lora and the vengeful Belvera, and one moth, Mothra, remain.

In the present, as Mothra exhausts energy to lay an egg and preserve her species, a logging company uncovers Desghidorah's subterranean prison and inadvertently break the seal containing it. Moll and Lora sensed something was awry and go to Japan to investigate. One of the workers, Yuichi Goto, takes the seal home and gives it to his young daughter Wakaba as a souvenir. Taking advantage, Belvera, believing humans are the enemy, controls Wakaba, and makes her torture her brother Taiki. Moll, Lora, and a smaller Mothra named Fairy battle Belvera for control of the artifact, though Belvera prevails. Moll and Lora befriend Taiki, Wakaba, and their mother, and they all travel to the site containing the seal in hopes of stopping Belvera. But she releases Desghidorah and uses him to help her destroy humanity before they can destroy her race.

As Desghidorah drains the environment's lifeforce, Mothra is summoned to fight it despite her condition. Amidst the battle, Mothra's larva senses his mother's deteriorating strength and hatches prematurely to help her. Though his energized silk seems to turn the tide of battle, Desghidorah bites the larva and drains its energy. Desperate, Mothra airlifts her child to safety and lures the dragon to a dam to distract it. After lowering her child into the sea, Mothra collapses from her age, wounds, and weariness and sinks to her death. The distraught larva attempts to save his mother, but to no avail, and swims away. Moll and Lora are able to take the seal back from Belvera, and give it to Taiki and Wakaba for safekeeping while they search for the larva.

Determined to avenge his mother, the young larva creates a cocoon and metamorphoses while Desghidorah goes on a rampage. While Taiki and Wakaba are witnessing the destruction left in the wake of the monster, Moll and Lora encourage them not to lose hope. Soon after, the new Mothra emerges in his imago form and battles Desghidorah. Drawing upon an ancient legacy, Mothra eventually renews the seal that originally bound the dragon, defeating him, and saving Earth. Belvera then escapes, vowing for revenge. After restoring a blasted region had been destroyed, Mothra travels to his ancestral home as Moll and Lora thank the children for helping them and return home to Infant Island with Fairy.

== Cast ==
- Sayaka Yamaguchi as Lora (ロラ, Rora)
- Megumi Kobayashi as Moll (モル, Moru)
- Aki Hano as Belvera (ベルベラ, Berubera)
- Kazuki Futami as Taiki Goto (後藤大樹, Gotō Taiki)
- Maya Fujisawa as Wakaba Goto (後藤若葉, Gotō Wakaba)
- Kenjiro Nashimoto as Yuichi Goto (後藤裕一, Gotō Yūichi)
- Hitomi Takahashi as Makiko Goto (後藤真紀子, Gotō Makiko)
- Mizuho Yoshida as Desghidorah (デスギドラ, Desugidora)

A photograph of Ishirō Honda appears in the Goto home.

== Production ==
One of Desghidorah props reused a head of Yamata no Orochi from the 1994 film Orochi, the Eight-Headed Dragon.

== Release ==
Rebirth of Mothra was released in Japan on December 14, 1996, where it was distributed by Toho. It was followed up with a sequel the following year, Rebirth of Mothra II.

=== Box office ===
By January 1997, Rebirth of Mothra earned a distribution income (rentals) of ¥1.15 billion in Japan. By the end of 1997, the film grossed a total box office revenue of ¥1.96 billion in Japan.

=== Home media ===
Rebirth of Mothra was released directly to video in the United States. It was released with an English dub by Columbia TriStar Home Video on August 3, 1999. It was released on DVD on February 1, 2000, as a double feature with Rebirth of Mothra II. Both films were only available with an English-dub. A triple feature of all three Rebirth of Mothra films was released on Blu-ray by Sony Pictures Home Entertainment on September 9, 2014, with both the Japanese and English voice tracks. In November 2017, Toho released the Rebirth of Mothra trilogy on Blu-ray in Japan.

== See also ==
- List of Japanese films of 1996
