= Rebirth of Mothra III =

1998 film by Okihiro Yoneda

- Theatrical release poster

Japanese name
- Kanji: モスラ 3 キングギドラ来襲
Transcriptions
- Revised Hepburn: Mosura Surī Kingu Gidora Raishū
- Directed by: Okihiro Yoneda
- Written by: Masumi Suetani
- Produced by: Shōgo Tomiyama
- Starring: Megumi Kobayashi; Misato Tate; Aki Hano; Koichi Ueda; Atsushi Onita
- Cinematography: Yoshinori Sekiguchi
- Edited by: Nobuo Ogawa
- Music by: Toshiyuki Watanabe
- Production company: Toho Pictures
- Distributed by: Toho
- Release date: December 12, 1998
- Running time: 99 minutes
- Country: Japan
- Language: Japanese
- Box office: ¥850 million (USD$$6,493,258)

Rebirth of Mothra III (モスラ 3 キングギドラ来襲, Mosura Surī Kingu Gidora Raishū; released in Japan as Mothra 3: Invasion of King Ghidorah) is a 1998 Japanese kaiju film directed by Okihiro Yoneda, written by Masumi Suetani, and produced by Shōgo Tomiyama. Produced and distributed by Toho Studios, it is the final film in the Rebirth of Mothra trilogy, following the previous year's Rebirth of Mothra II.

Rebirth of Mothra III stars Megumi Kobayashi, Misato Tate, Aki Hano, Atsushi Ohnita, and Miyuki Matsuda, and features the giant monster characters Rainbow Mothra and King Ghidorah. The film was released theatrically in Japan on December 12, 1998, and was released in the United States as a Sci-Fi Channel TV premiere on May 31, 2003. However, despite its predecessors being released on DVD in 2000, the film did not receive a North American home media release until 2014, when all three films were released on a Blu-ray bundle by Sony Pictures Home Entertainment.

== Plot ==
The Elias sisters, Moll and Lora, attempt to stop their vengeful sister, Belvera from seeking the secret power of the Elias Triangle, three power units that can transform the sisters' daggers into powerful swords. Belvera succeeds, but she is thwarted by her sisters' pet, Fairy Mothra, and fails to retrieve the proper unit for her dagger while Moll and Lora end up with one for the former.

The next day, teenager Shota ditches school to investigate a meteor recently landed in Aokigahara Forest, while children from across the city mysteriously vanish. Upon examining the meteor's remains, Moll and Lora deduce that King Ghidorah, a three-headed space dragon who had invaded Earth and killed the dinosaurs, has returned to capture the children, placing them in an organic dome. Moll and Lora then summon their ally, Mothra, to fight Ghidorah. After a brief battle, the dragon overpowers Mothra and hypnotizes Lora, forcing her to attack Moll before attempting to drag them both into the dome. Lora falls inside, but Moll is rescued by Fairy. Intrigued by Ghidorah's arrival, Belvera investigates, but gets dragged into the dome as well.

Moll befriends Shota, who learned that his siblings Shuehei and Tamako were among those captured, and tells him about Ghidorah's plan to feed on the children's life force. After the two encounter Mothra, Moll and Mothra devise a plan where the moth travels back in time to battle a younger and weaker Ghidorah in hopes of defeating him. Moll then uses all of her powers to send Mothra to the past. Afterward, she gives Shota her dagger, asking him to enter the dome to find Lora, break Ghidorah's spell on her, and convince her to help Mothra battle Ghidorah. After Shota reluctantly agrees, Moll collapses and falls into a state of suspended animation. In the dome, Belvera encounters Lora and informs her of Ghidorah's plans to destroy the human race and Earth. Still under the monster's spell, Lora takes Belvera's unit, transforms her dagger, and engages Belvera in combat, incapacitating her.

Shota lets Ghidorah send him inside the dome, where he finds Lora and urges her to help Mothra; however, she attacks him. Belvera tells Lora to stop and tells Shota to look at Lora, eventually breaking Ghidorah's spell. As Lora passes out, her dagger combines with Moll's. Realizing that the Elias Triangle represents her and her sisters, Belvera uses her dagger and unit to merge with the other swords, transforming into one super sword, and uses it in attempts to break the dome. After recovering, Lora sends her powers to Mothra, allowing him to immobilize and kill Ghidorah by dropping him in a volcano, but unaware a severed piece of his tail has burrowed underground. Fatally wounded during the fight and burnt from the volcano, Mothra crashes to the ground and dies. However, three ancient Mothra larvae appear and encase him in a silk cocoon.

In the present, Ghidorah and the dome disappear, freeing the children. Shota reunites with his siblings and join Belvera and Lora as they stand vigil over Moll. However, Ghidorah reappears and recaptures the children, having regenerated from the severed tail. Belvera and Lora then join forces to fight Ghidorah until Mothra emerges from the cocoon buried under the hillside, reborn as Armor Mothra. He does battle with Ghidorah and ultimately disintegrates him, saving everyone from his wrath. Afterward, he evolves into Eternal Mothra and tells Belvera and Lora to channel their powers through their sword to revive Moll. After they do so, the sword disappears, and Moll revives. After a brief touching reunion of all three Elias sisters, Belvera flies off. As the children are released once more and reunite with their parents, Shota and his family watch as Moll, Lora, Fairy, and Mothra fly off into the sunset.

== Cast ==
- Megumi Kobayashi as Moll
- Misato Tate as Lora
- Aki Hano as Belvera
- Atsushi Ohnita as Father
- Miyuki Matsuda as Mother
- Kôichi Ueda as Kôchô

King Ghidorah was played and worn by Tsutomu Kitagawa, who also portrayed Cretaceous King Ghidorah in the film and would go on to play Godzilla in five of the six Millennium films.

== Release ==
=== Home media ===
The film was released on Blu-ray by Sony, as part of the Toho Godzilla Collection, with all 3 Rebirth of Mothra films in September 2014.
