= Mobile Suit Gundam: Cucuruz Doan's Island =

2022 Japanese film by Yoshikazu Yasuhiko

- Theatrical release poster
- Directed by: Yoshikazu Yasuhiko
- Screenplay by: Toshizou Nemoto
- Based on: Mobile Suit Gundam by: Hajime Yatate; Yoshiyuki Tomino
- Produced by: Naohiro Ogata
- Starring: Toru Furuya; Shunsuke Takeuchi; Atsushi Miyauchi; Fu Hirohara
- Cinematography: Takeshi Kuzuyama; Ryou Iijima
- Edited by: Kazuhiro Nii
- Music by: Takayuki Hattori
- Production company: Sunrise
- Distributed by: Shochiku
- Release date: June 3, 2022
- Running time: 108 minutes
- Country: Japan
- Language: Japanese
- Box office: 1.08 billion yen

Mobile Suit Gundam: Cucuruz Doan's Island (Japanese: 機動戦士ガンダム ククルス・ドアンの島, Hepburn: Kidō Senshi Gundamu: Kukurusu Doan no Shima) is a Japanese mecha animated film directed by Yoshikazu Yasuhiko. The film is based on the fifteenth episode of the television series Mobile Suit Gundam—an installment notorious for its poor quality due to complete outsourcing and the director's (Yasuhiko's) hospitalization—leading Yasuhiko to consider it deserving of a proper remake. Set during the One Year War, the story centers on Amuro Ray piloting the Gundam alongside the crew of the White Base, as they are tasked with locating Zeon stragglers on a remote island. The film premiered in Japan on June 3, 2022.

== Plot ==
While the White Base is docked in Las Palmas, Captain Bright Noa is ordered by Admiral Gopp to eliminate remaining Zeon operatives on the island of Alegranza to secure safe passage for a fleet bound for Gibraltar. Amuro Ray, Kai Shiden, and Hayato Kobayashi are dispatched; during the mission, Kai is pelted by rocks on his Guncannon, while Amuro is ambushed by a lone Zaku and falls off a cliff, losing contact with the White Base.

The next morning, Amuro awakens in a lighthouse and meets Cucuruz Doan, a former Zeon ace who deserted to protect orphaned children. While helping Doan and the children with daily tasks, Amuro spends time searching for his Gundam.

Meanwhile, Zeon commander M'Quve threatens nuclear retaliation unless the Federation ceases its advance on Gibraltar, prompting Doan's former comrades to converge on the island to restart missile launch systems.

Generals aboard the White Base, ordered by General Revil, are instructed to resupply in Belfast, but Bright delays departure under the pretense of mechanical issues to aid in Amuro's rescue.

Sleggar Law leads a rescue team to the island and clashes with Doan's Southern Cross unit. During the conflict, Amuro discovers his missing Gundam concealed in a Zeon base beneath the island and learns Doan had sabotaged the missile launch to protect the children.

The Zeon operatives trigger the missile launch, but the six warheads self-destruct mid-air. Amuro confronts Doan's former comrade in a final showdown, defeating him. Amuro then uses the Gundam to carry Doan's Zaku and push it off the cliff—symbolically freeing him from the burdens of war. As dawn breaks, the White Base departs for Belfast, passing over Alegranza as the children bid farewell.

== Cast ==
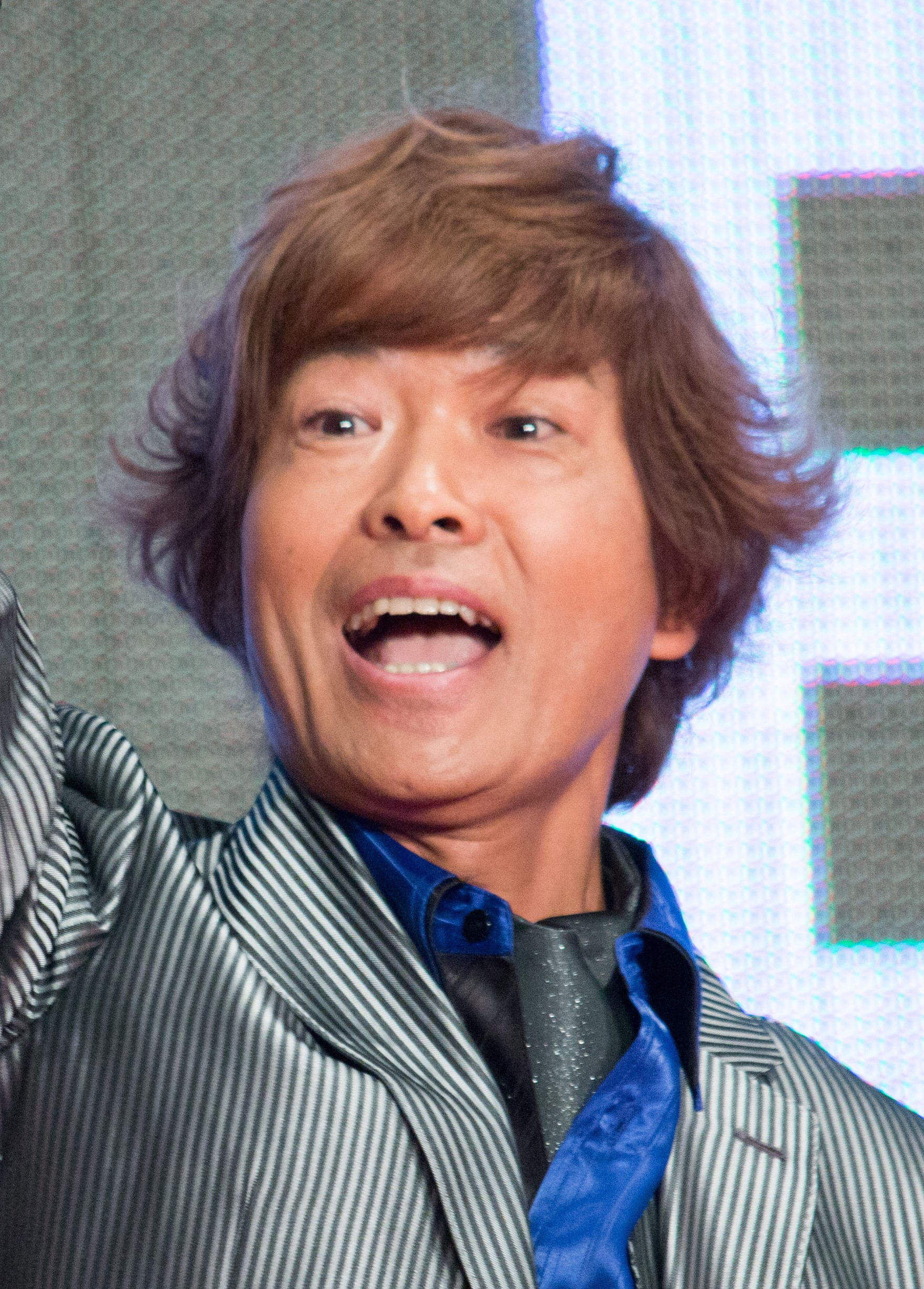
Tōru Furuya reprised his role as Amuro Ray.

Character	Japanese	English
Cucuruz Doan	Shunsuke Takeuchi	Mike Smith
Amuro Ray	Tōru Furuya	Lucien Dodge
Egba Atler	Atsushi Miyauchi	Gianni Matragrano
Cara	Fu Hirohara	Kimberly Woods
Hayato Kobayashi	Hideki Nakanishi	Kyle McCarley
Johann Ibrahim Revil	Hiroshi Naka	Jason Simon
Elran	Hiroshi Shirokuma	Mick Wingert
Staff Officer	Katsuyuki Konishi	Mick Wingert
Bright Noa	Ken Narita	Christopher Corey Smith
Yun Sanho	Koji Yusa	Nicholas Andrew Louie
Uragang	Makoto Yasumura	David Jordan Chen
Sayla Mass	Megumi Han	Colleen O'Shaughnessey
Fraw Bow	Misato Fukuen	Alyson Leigh Rosenfeld
Gopp	Naomi Kusumi	Jason Simon
Mirai Yashima	Satomi Arai	Fryda Wolff
Selma Livens	Shizuka Itou	Dawn M. Bennett
M'Quve	Takumi Yamazaki	Ezra Weisz
Sleggar Law	Tomofumi Ikezoe	Eliah Mountjoy
Kai Shiden	Toshio Furukawa	Kevin T. Collins
Waldo Ren	Yōji Ueda	Crispin Freeman
Marcos	Yūma Uchida	Paul Castro Jr.
Danan Rashica	Yuu Hayashi	Andrew Kishino
Char Aznable	Shūichi Ikeda	Keith Silverstein

== Production ==
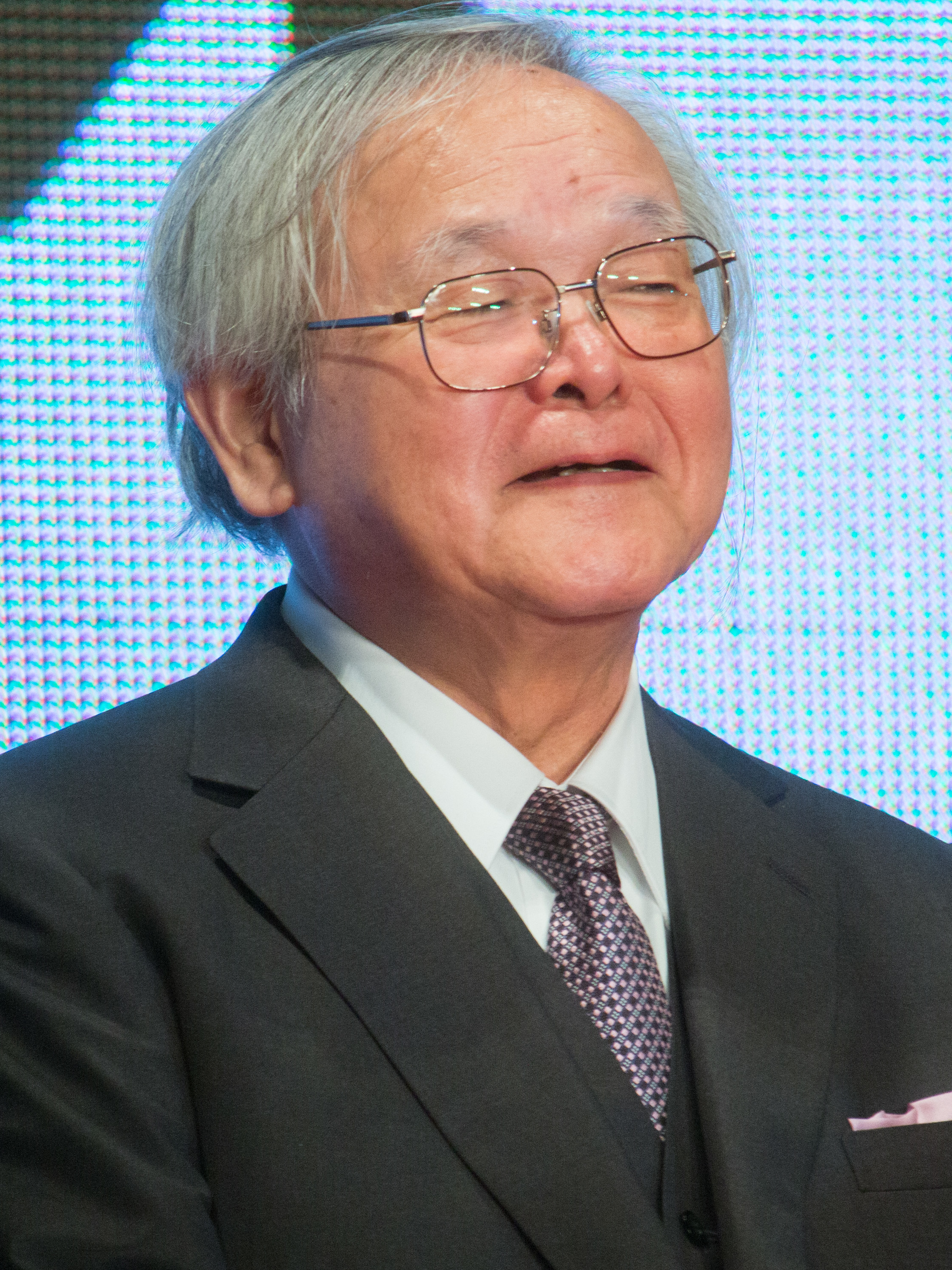
Director Yoshikazu Yasuhiko stated the film would be his last work in animation.

The film originated from the 15th episode of Mobile Suit Gundam. Director Yoshiyuki Tomino said the episode had so many mistakes that he wanted to skip it and never release it. This was mostly due to art director and character designer Yoshikazu Yasuhiko being hospitalized. Although the episode was never released in western territories, Sunrise often referenced it in different installments. Yasuhiko eventually revealed in the 2020s that the episode was also completely outsourced but still believed it had potential to tell a good story as a film. This studio that animated the episode was Anime Friend, a subsidiary of Tatsunoko Production that appeared in the credits of Cucuruz Doan's Island. Yasuhiko also omitted the story from his own manga that retells the anime, The Origin, but was still interested by its themes.

Tōru Furuya reprised his role of the protagonist Amuro Ray and did not express any struggle despite not having voiced him in decades. Shunsuke Takeuchi voiced the title character Cucuruz Doan; he noted Furuya was one of his inspirations when working as voice actor. In recording the movie, Yasuhiko commented that Takeuchi was cast late already by the time most of Furuya's lines were recorded. Upon being selected, Takeuchi was glad with taking the role. Several recasts had to be made for the White Base crew. Furuya was nostalgic about the role and stated that the film made emphasis of how clashing was the relationship between Amuro and his superior, Captain Bright Noa.

Due to the differences of demographics between the 1970s and the 2020s, the character of Bright Noa was redesigned as a more adult character rather than the young adult from the TV series. Yasuhiko considered the film's children to be actual protagonists. In casting their voice actors, Yasuhiko aimed to make them noisy and separate them from the adult ones. The director wanted to prove that Japanese films could do better with child actors. Furuya elaborated that Yasuhiko's idea was making the movie realistic with Amuro acting more mature in relationship with the children. Another theme of the film was how the youth's lives are being ruined by the plot of the One Year War story from the original television series.

According to producer Naohiro Ogata, the film's elements are "anti-war" and "smaller battles". Although the episodes generally are 20 minutes long, the original story was expanded to 100 minutes which, according to Kawai, would surprise the audience. Kawai personally wanted the film to properly depict Amuro's mecha RX-78-02 Gundam in the same fashion as the original television series from 1978. The team asked Yamato Works to help with the CGI animation, while Sunrise's staff member Shuhei Morita instead wanted to use hand-drawn animation. Ogata suggested that depending on the film's success, he considered other episodes also being remade as films. The film was compared with Apocalypse Now by the director.

The film's theme song is "Ubugoe" by Hiroko Moriguchi.

== Release ==
Upon its release, the film made 300 million yen in Japan. It debuted third on its first weekend, reaching 400 million yen. It ended with 1.08 billion yen by the end of August. While the film was licensed by Crunchyroll for an English release, its debut in the United Kingdom was postponed for unspecified reasons.

The film's Blu-ray and DVD was released in Japan by Emotion on November 25, 2022. The limited edition includes the film's official soundtrack.

== Reception ==
Anime News Network praised the movie for the focus on Amuro's character arc and modern themes without removing the original aspects of the franchise. Asian Anime Pulse also commented on the film positively for its handling of drama and animation, believing newcomers might enjoy it. The Japan Times commented that every viewer would be concerned by Amuro's safety due to how the main plot has him surviving the encounter from the original TV series but still felt returning fans would enjoy the story and how the disciplinary actions performed in White Base are contested.

== Legacy ==
The animator Atsushi Tamura simultaneously participated in the productions of Mobile Suit Gundam: Cucuruz Doan's Island and the Netflix series Gamera Rebirth. This, along with the director Hiroyuki Seshita's liking of Yoshikazu Yasuhiko works especially Giant Gorg (1984), influenced the character design of the Gamera anime.

== Accolades ==
Year	Award	Category	Recipient	Result	Ref.
2023	77th Mainichi Film Awards	Best Animation Film / Ōfuji Noburō Award	Mobile Suit Gundam: Cucuruz Doan's Island	Nominated	

== Notes ==
Preceded by Gundam Breaker Battlogue	Gundam metaseries (production order); 2022	Succeeded by Mobile Suit Gundam: The Witch from Mercury
Preceded by Mobile Suit Gundam	Universal Century; U.C. 0079	Succeeded by Mobile Suit Gundam
