= Godzilla 3 =

Godzilla 3 may refer to:

- King Kong vs. Godzilla, the third film in Showa era of Godzilla films
- Godzilla: The Planet Eater, the third film in the Godzilla anime trilogy, sometimes referred to as Godzilla 3: The Planet Eater in marketing
- Godzilla vs. Kong, the sequel to Godzilla: King of the Monsters (2019) and the third Godzilla film in the Monsterverse franchise
