= Chris Niosi =

American animator, producer, and voice actor (born 1988)

- Born: Christopher Edwin Niosi; December 31, 1988 (age 37); Northport, New York, U.S.
- Other name: Kirbopher
- Education: School of Visual Arts
- Occupations: Animator, producer, voice actor
- Years active: 2004–present

Christopher Edwin Niosi (born December 31, 1988), also known by his pseudonym Kirbopher, is an American voice actor, animator, and producer. His voice-work includes Lord Uroko in Nagi-Asu: A Lull in the Sea, Arataka Reigen in Mob Psycho 100, Dezel in Tales of Zestiria, Taira in Queen's Blade Rebellion, Tetsuya Kinomoto in Dr. Stone, Khoury and others in the Pokémon series, Ernesto and others in OK K.O.! Let's Be Heroes, Pegasus in the Viz Media dub of Sailor Moon, Haruo Sakaki in Godzilla: Planet of the Monsters, Godzilla: City on the Edge of Battle, and Godzilla: The Planet Eater, and Therion and Mattias in Octopath Traveler.

== Early life ==
Niosi was born and raised in Northport, New York. He attended the School of Visual Arts in New York City. He has one half-brother and two half sisters. One half-sister, Alison Fanelli, is a former child actor who went on to become a physician.

== Career ==
=== Animation ===
Niosi began making numerous animations for Newgrounds under the name "Kirbopher" in 2004, mostly making Nintendo-based parodies like "Rawest Forest", a Super Mario RPG-inspired music video based on the song of the same name that vent viral on video-sharing websites like Newgrounds, YouTube, and Japanese-language website Niconico. His first professional animation job was for Eduware providing character design, animation and voices. He has also worked as an animator for the video games A Hat in Time, Skullgirls and Cryamore.

==== Terrain of Magical Expertise ====
Niosi is the creator of the project Terrain of Magical Expertise, also known as TOME. The web series is known for its inclusion of several YouTube personalities and veteran voice actors such as Yuri Lowenthal, Jon St. John, and Kyle Hebert. The series' concept was based on Niosi's experiences and interactions on internet forums in the early 2000's. The series' second season was eventually crowdfunded through GoFundMe to produce the remaining five episodes. The majority of the animation services were provided by Niosi himself, along with several guest animators and production assistants. TOME was first released on Newgrounds on November 11, 2011, and ran for sixteen episodes and nine shorts. The final episode released on July 7, 2015, while the final short released on November 11, 2016. In 2023, Niosi would later release a special edition version of the web series in the form of three compilations he titled the TOME: A2Z Compilation Movie Trilogy.

On September 30, 2017, a Kickstarter for a video game adaptation was launched. The game features a customizable avatar known as the White Hat Hacker joining the established characters. The campaign was fully funded on November 4, 2017, successfully raising $111,162.63. The game was produced by Niosi's company NEO-C Productions LLC., with Niosi serving as the director, lead designer and character animator of the game, and was published by 1C Company, released on September 9, 2021, on Steam.

=== Voice acting ===
Niosi started doing voice acting on amateur productions on Newgrounds, but in 2009, he eventually booked his first professional gig as "Khoury" in five episodes of Pokémon: Diamond and Pearl: Galactic Battles. In 2014, he began voicing anime characters such as Yujiro Hattori in Bakuman, Taira in Queen's Blade Rebellion, and video game characters such as Dezel in Tales of Zestiria (which he later reprised in Tales of Zestiria the X). In 2016, Niosi voiced Arataka Reigen from Mob Psycho 100. In 2017, he was announced as the voice of Pegasus for the Viz Media dub of Sailor Moon SuperS.

In 2016, Niosi became a series regular in Cartoon Network's OK K.O.! Let's Be Heroes, which started airing on August 1, 2017; he voiced characters such as Nick Army, Neil, Pird and Ernesto. These roles eventually lead Niosi to join SAG-AFTRA and to be represented by Arlene Thornton & Associates. In 2018, Niosi was cast as Therion and Mattias in Octopath Traveler. In 2022, he went on to voice multiple characters in Monster Hunter Rise and River City Girls 2.

== Personal life ==
Niosi is autistic. He moved to Los Angeles in 2014 to pursue a career in the animation industry.

=== Abuse controversies ===
In response to Tumblr and Twitter callout posts, on July 18, 2019, Niosi made a post on his Tumblr account confessing that he had been emotionally abusive to friends and colleagues and sexually coercive to partners. Niosi's post highlighted specific instances of abuse for which he issued public apologies. In response to the allegations, Nintendo recast him with Zach Aguilar in Fire Emblem Heroes and Fire Emblem: Three Houses. Niosi's credit was removed from Heroes as of July 25, 2019, and the distribution of the character was delayed. The following day, Aguilar was also stated to have re-recorded Byleth's lines for Three Houses and would be replacing the original voiceovers in the following patch, which went live on September 11, 2019.

On July 17, 2024, Niosi was revealed to be the voice of Moze in Honkai: Star Rail, with many fans of the game wanting him recast. In response, voice actors Griffin Puatu and Kyle McCarley decided to speak out in support of Niosi's casting, leading to Puatu losing out on a role in Lost in Limbo and McCarley deleting his X account due to the backlash. Niosi eventually stated a week after the announcement that he was stepping down from the role.

== Filmography ==
=== Animation ===
List of voice performances in animation
Year	Title	Role	Notes	Source
2016	Alpha and Omega 6: Dino Digs	Ian		Netflix
2017–19	OK K.O.! Let's Be Heroes	Nick Army, Pird, Ernesto, Neil, others		
2018	Cinderella and the Secret Prince	Alex		
2019	Camp Halohead	Shrunk		YouTube
2020	YooHoo to the Rescue	Apo	Episode 48	Netflix
2022	Barbie: It Takes Two	Dash		Netflix
2024	Smiling Friends		Animator (S02E5)	Adult Swim

=== Anime ===
List of English dubbing performances in anime
Year	Title	Role	Notes	Source
2009	Pokémon: Diamond and Pearl: Galactic Battles	Khoury		
2011	Bakuman	Yujiro Hattori		Facebook
2015	Nagi-Asu: A Lull in the Sea	Lord Uroko		
2015	Mobile Suit Gundam: The Origin	Garma Zabi		
2016	Mobile Suit Gundam: Iron-Blooded Orphans	Savarin Canele		
2016	Tales of Zestiria the X	Dezel		
2016	The Asterisk War	Wernher		
2016	Sailor Moon SuperS	Pegasus		Press
2016	World War Blue	Zelik		Press
2016–22	Mob Psycho 100	Arataka Reigen		
2017	Terra Formars	Akari Hizamaru		
2017	Blue Exorcist: Kyoto Saga	Susumu Yunokawa		
2017	Kakegurui	Kaede Manyuda		
2017–18	Fate/Apocrypha	Karna / Lancer of Red		
2018	Re:Zero − Starting Life in Another World	Julius Juukulius	Season 1	
2018	Sword Gai	Toshio Tanabe		
2018	Boruto: Naruto Next Generation	Kawaki, Magire Kakuremino	Episode 1	
2018	Dragon Pilot: Hisone and Masotan	Shirota		
2018	Mobile Suit Gundam SEED	Romero Pal		
2018	Saint Seiya: The Lost Canvas	Aquarius Degel, Pakia		
2018–19	Hunter x Hunter	Shaiapouf		
2018–19	Hero Mask	Harry Creighton		Netflix
2019	Dragon Ball Super	Zircor		
2019	Sword Art Online: Alicization	Volo Levantein		
2019	Isekai Quartet	Julius Juukulius		
2019	Fairy Tail	Rung		
2019	The Disastrous Life of Saiki K.	Hiroshi Satou		Netflix
2021	Dr. Stone	Tetsuya Kinomoto		
2021	Muhyo & Roji's Bureau of Supernatural Investigation	Hirata Zansetsu		
2021	King's Raid: Successors of the Will	Ziero		
2022	In the Land of Leadale	Skargo		
2022	Love of Kill	George		
2023	The Legend of Heroes: Trails of Cold Steel – Northern War	Talion Drake		
2023	Digimon Adventure:	Gravimon, NiseDrimogemon		

=== Film dubbing ===
List of English dubbing performances in direct-to-video, feature and television films
Year	Title	Role	Notes	Source
2014	Patema Inverted	Lagos		
2017	Napping Princess	Morio Sawatari		
2018	Godzilla: Planet of the Monsters	Haruo Sakaki		
2018	Godzilla: City on the Edge of Battle	Haruo Sakaki		
2019	Godzilla: The Planet Eater	Haruo Sakaki		
2023	Black Clover: Sword of the Wizard King	Conrad Leto		

=== Video games ===
List of voice and English dubbing performances in video games
Year	Title	Role	Notes	Source
2010–13	Jisei series	Mikolaj Gurski		
2011	The EDUGame	Various	Also animator	Press, website
2012	Skullgirls	—N/a	Animator	Website
2012	Dust: An Elysian Tail	Moonblood Soldiers		
2012	Primordia	Oswald Factorbuilt, 187		
2012	Resonance	Ozzy, Officer Johnson		
2014	Smite	K-9 Anubis, Riftshaker Janus, Captain Quick Mercury, Glub Glub Geb		
2015	Disgaea 5	Void Dark		
2015	Sick Bricks	Bucky Blastoff, Perfectimus Supreme, Manely Chesthair, Scuttle Bot, Young Deevy, Rusted Stumbler, Stealth Shade, Breaki Smashisan, Knight Rat, Protector Servo		
2015	Blackhole	Nejfake	Also voice director	
2015	Tales of Zestiria	Dezel		
2017	A Hat in Time	—N/a	Animator and voice director	Website
2017	Friday the 13th: The Game	Tommy Jarvis		
2018	Octopath Traveler	Therion		
2018	Sprint Vector	—N/a	Voice director	
2018	Creed: Rise to Glory	—N/a	Voice director	
2018	MapleStory 2	Lennon, Rolling Thunder, Bobby, Jorge, Springer, Kakalp, MK 52, 50 Meso		
2019	Combat Core	Zetto		
2019	Battlewake	—N/a	Voice director	
2019	YIIK: A Postmodern RPG	Alex Eggleston, Anthony Eggleston		
2019	Death end re;Quest	Arata Mizunashi		
2019	Fire Emblem: Three Houses	Byleth (male)	Version 1.0.1 and earlier; replaced with Zach Aguilar from version 1.0.2 onward	
2020	Final Fantasy VII Remake	Additional voices	English version	
2020	The Walking Dead Onslaught	—N/a	Voice director	
2021	Terrain of Magical Expertise	Additional voices	Also creator, animator, voice director	
2022	Monster Hunter Rise	Black Hell Hunter, Pingarh the Sailor, Calgo the Researcher	English version	
2022	River City Girls 2	Ryuji & Ryuichi		
2023	Company of Heroes 3	US Engineer		
