= Gamera Rebirth =

Japanese streaming television series

- Key visual poster
- Genre: Kaiju, science fiction
- Original net animation
- Directed by: Hiroyuki Seshita
- Produced by: Tetsu Iijima
- Written by: Hiroyuki Seshita; Kenta Ihara; Hiroshi Seko; Tetsuya Yamada; Niisan Takahashi (uncredited)
- Music by: Shūji Katayama
- Studio: ENGI
- Licensed by: Netflix
- Released: September 7, 2023
- Episodes: 6
- Manga

Gamera Rebirth Code Thyrsos
- Written by: Cambria Bakuhatsutarō
- Published by: Kadokawa Shoten
- Imprint: Kadokawa Comics A
- Magazine: Young Ace UP
- Original run: September 8, 2023 – December 27, 2024
- Volumes: 1

Gamera Rebirth (stylized as GAMERA -Rebirth-) is a Japanese original net animation (ONA) series directed and co-written by Hiroyuki Seshita. Produced by Kadokawa Corporation and animated by ENGI, it is a reboot of the Gamera franchise and the 13th entry in the franchise. The series was released worldwide on Netflix on September 7, 2023, and a re-edited edition consisting of 12 episodes was broadcast on NHK General TV from April to June in 2025.

== Overview ==
It is the first animated entry and is the first major installment of the franchise following Gamera the Brave (2006), making it also the first entry in the Reiwa era. In response to the commercial failure of the 2006 film, both Gamera and Daimajin franchises had faced stagnations, and various plans were terminated including several Gamera anime projects (such as the ones by the Cartoon Network and Yoshitomo Yonetani). The director Hiroyuki Seshita had previously participated in Rex: A Dinosaur's Story (1993), the last film by the Kadokawa Pictures with influences on the direction of Gamera the Brave.

The series is designated as a tribute to Noriaki Yuasa and to stay faithful to previous productions especially the Showa films, where the time setting of the series (1989) is to represent both eras of Showa and Heisei, and a number of references to previous films and scrapped projects and unused ideas were made. Akin to Gamera the Brave, the storyline of Gamera Rebirth has been under the influences from the "Konaka Gamera" script, one of two original plots prepared for Gamera: Guardian of the Universe (1995) by Chiaki and Kazuya Konaka.

One of policies for battle scenes was to prevent human casualties by Gamera, therefore such depictions were avoided during the turtle kaiju's appearances in early episodes; Gamera arrived at Tokyo after most evacuations were completed, and he threw Gyaos and Jiger at open areas without people. (Note: Showa Memorial Park in the first episode, and a riverbed of Tama River in the second episode.) Seshita also highlighted the concept of "children, who have been protected by Gamera, in return protect Gamera".

Designs of Gamera and Gyaos, and the first scene of Gamera to fight against a flock of small Gyaos in the first episode were reused from the 2015 short film, and Katsuhito Ishii, the director of the 2015 short film was credited as the designer of Gamera. Gamera's design was modified from the 2015 version to portray him being less intimidating, and to emphasize his intelligence, gentleness, and dignity.

Japanese punk rock band Wanima provided both opening and ending songs, Natsuake and FLY&DIVE (jp). An acoustic version of Gamera March, the iconic song used in Showa films and other medias, was also inserted.

== Synopsis ==
During summer 1989, three elementary students witness Gamera in battle as monsters converge on Tokyo before they annihilate most of humanity.

== Voice cast ==
Characters	Japanese	English
Hiroki "Boco" Wada	Hisako Kanemoto	Ryan Bartley
Satoru "Joe" Matsuoka	Yoshitsugu Matsuoka	Robbie Daymond
Jun "Junichi" Ichihara	Aki Toyosaki	Abby Trott
Douglas Ken Osborn ("Brody")	Subaru Kimura	Sean Chiplock
James Joshua Tazaki	Mamoru Miyano	Kaiji Tang
Emiko Melchiorri	Saori Hayami	Suzie Yeung
Muneatsu Sasaki	Takahiro Sakurai	Tom Choi
Mio Enatsu	Yu Shimamura	Elspeth Eastman
Atsushi Higashifushimi	Ryosuke Higa	Keenan Shimizu
Aiko Wada	Nanako Mori	Melissa Greenspan
Raymond Osborn	Kazuya Nakai (Note: Nakai, aside from his role as Halu-Elu Dolu-do in Hiroyuki Seshita's Godzilla anime trilogy, has also participated in the promotion of Gamera the Brave.)	Patrick Seitz
Nora Melchiorri	Marie Ōi	Karen Strassman
Winston Griffith	Wataru Hatano	Todd Haberkorn
Anselm Rybrant	Yuki Tamai	Michael C. Pizzuto
Prudencio Fortea	Shunsuke Takeuchi	Jason Griffith
Bernie Dawson	Kazuhiro Nakaya (voice actor)	William Salyers
Roderich Auler	Wataru Tsuyuzaki	Xander Mobus
Erkki Pirhonen	Seiyu Fujiwara	Ryan Colt Levy
Dario Montemayor	Kosuke Onishi	Zeno Robinson
Professor Suzuki	Yoshihito Sasaki (voice actor)	Bill Rogers
Professor Matsui	Daisuke Yokota (voice actor)	Todd Haberkorn
Julian Bompiani	Ryota Suzuki	
Angus Gayler	Tomohito Takatsuka	
Mark Addison	Gen Sato	
U.S. soldiers	Kazuki Yoshida; Shomaru Zoza; Taiki Yamashita	
Others	Miho Hayashi; Taichi Sugiyama; Takeshi Hayakawa; Tasuku Kida	Christopher W. Jones; Dorothy Fahn; Michael C. Pizzuto

== Production ==
On November 16, 2022, Kadokawa announced plans for a new Gamera production, entitled Gamera Rebirth, which will be released globally on Netflix. Shusuke Kaneko, director of the Heisei Gamera trilogy, had proposed an idea for a new film. However, Kadokawa had already proceeded with their new project by the time Kaneko presented his pitch. Regardless, Kaneko had expressed his support for the project. A figure of Gamera was exhibited at Tamashii Nation 2022 between November 18 and 20, along with a newspaper featuring Gamera that was distributed at the event.

In February 2023, Kadokawa revealed the cast and staff. The series would be animated by ENGI, with Hiroyuki Seshita directing, who co-directed Polygon Pictures' Godzilla anime trilogy, (Note: Several voice actors from the Godzilla anime trilogy participate in Gamera Rebirth, such as Mamoru Miyano, Saori Hayami, and Kazuya Nakai.) Tetsu Iijima producing, Atsushi Tamura designing the characters, and Kan Takahama designing the monsters. A teaser released in January debuted footage, albeit briefly, from the series and revealed that it would consist of six episodes and feature five additional enemy monsters. In March, Kadokawa released a new key visual poster, a synopsis, and a full trailer.

Seshita approved the offer for the Netflix series partially because Kadokawa approved his request to focus on kaiju battles which he couldn't achieve in the Godzilla anime trilogy (due to the policies set by Toho). He originally prepared fighting scenes twice or five times more than actual ones, including more diverse abilities and characteristics of kaiju, however he had to cut them due to budget and schedule, and noted the difficulty to insert kaiju battles in every episode due to budgetary constraints. The aforementioned direction to avoid casualties by Gamera was also effective to reduce production costs by limiting destructions of urban areas.

ENGI was originally launched to focus on 2D anime, and 3D CGI department was newly established for Gamera Rebirth. As the company was relatively new and most of its creators are young, production of Gamera Rebirth and building ENGI's CGI department were simultaneously progressed, drastically increasing the difficulty of the production.

=== Staffing and influences from other works ===
- Among Seshita's previous works, his Godzilla anime trilogy, KamiErabi God.app, Ajin: Demi-Human, and Levius had significant influences on Gamera Rebirth. Seshita had previously co-participated in Hiroshi Seko, Kenta Ihara, and Jin in these works (except for the Godzilla trilogy). Similarly, some colleagues of Seshita (from their Final Fantasy era) joined the production team. These staffing eased the decision-making processes for Gamera Rebirth.
  - His dissatisfaction with the Godzilla anime trilogy's exclusion of detailed kaiju battles was one of major reasons for his appointment for Gamera Rebirth, and he reused a number of concepts from the Godzilla trilogy for the Netflix series, along with appointments of some voice actors.
- Gamera Rebirth also took notable inspirations from the Cthulhu Mythos and Nausicaä of the Valley of the Wind.
  - The former had shaped both the "Konaka Gamera" and the Heisei Gamera trilogy, where Shusuke Kaneko had also participated in Necronomicon.
  - The latter possesses connections with the Heisei Gamera trilogy especially when Daiei Film was under Tokuma Shoten. Mitsunori Kataama and Naoya Tanaka and Atsushi Tamura from Studio Ghibli participated in Gamera Rebirth, and its character design was under the influences from Ghibli's art styles. The three has also previously contributed in projects by both Seshita and his friend Makoto Shinkai.
  - Yoshikazu Yasuhiko's Giant Gorg and Mobile Suit Gundam: Cucuruz Doan's Island also influenced character designs of Gamera Rebirth, where Atsushi Tamura also participated in the latter.
- Gamera Rebirth introduced various references to a variety of topics, such as the tale of Urashima Tarō, Stand by Me, (Note: The original novel The Body itself was under the influence from American Graffiti.) Stranger Things, Blade Runner, and the below-mentioned Destiny's Son and Aura Battler Dunbine (which was produced as a rival work to Nausicaä of the Valley of the Wind).
- Shinichiro Inoue decided the titles of each episodes as references to classic films and other productions; Kanał, Run Silent, Run Deep, Daiei Film's Destiny's Son The Moon Is a Harsh Mistress, Childhood's End, and Aura Battler Dunbine.
  - Masaichi Nagata and others such as Ichikawa Raizō VIII (the spouse of Masaichi's adopted daughter Masako Ōta) had participated in Destiny's Son.
  - Arthur C. Clarke's 2001: A Space Odyssey (1968) was influenced by Warning from Space (1956) which bears connections with the Gamera franchise. On the other hand, Gamera vs. Viras (1968) instead bears similarities to 2001: A Space Odyssey for its depictions of spaceships and technologies.
  - Various Aura Battler Dunbine references in the first episode, including the choice of Nishi-Shinjuku were tributes to Yoshiyuki Tomino; Inoue was once an editor in charge of Tomino including the Dunbine publication, and Inoue specially gained a permission to use the book from Arata Sasaki for the references.

== Episodes ==
No. overall	No. in season	Title	Directed by	Written by	Original release date
1	1	"Over Tokyo"; Transliteration: "Tōkyō Jōkū" (Japanese: 東京上空)	Hiroyuki Seshita	Unknown	September 7, 2023
Opening in medias res, eleven year old Boco records a voice message to his friend, Joe on a beach, recalling a promise about their last summer together. Earlier that summer in Tokyo, Boco, Joe and their friend Junichi plan to buy a communications radio, when Boco rescues an odd turtle stuck in the pond at their treehouse. They are soon accosted by neighbourhood bullies led by Brody, who steals their money. Meanwhile in New Guinea, the Eustace Foundation mining company uncovered multiple eggs, which hatch and grow into a swarm of flying creatures, Gyaos, soon converging on Tokyo. To get their money back, Boco and his friends confront Brody and his at an arcade, where they're caught up in an attack by the Gyaos. While the flock of Gyaos overpowers the military forces, some of its individual turns attention towards the children. The children are rescued by the arrival of Gamera, a turtle-like Kaiju, who kills the larger Gyaos, after wiping out the flock of smaller Gyaos. Shortly thereafter, a rescue team led by Agent James Tazaki and Dr. Emiko Melchiorri picks up the children for questioning.
2	2	"Under Current"; Transliteration: "Chika Suidō" (Japanese: 地下水道)	Hiroyuki Seshita	Unknown	September 7, 2023
After their encounter with Gamera, the kids learn from Tazalo and Emiko the history of the kaiju and the Eustace Foundation's research, and are asked to cooperate to learn more about the kaiju. Later, Brody reaches out to the others with information he picked up from his father, a Commander within the USJF. At the Eustace Foundation, kaiju eggs are kept and hatch into lizard-like creatures, and escape into the sewers. Brody leads the kids to a sewer, before Emiko and James set out to find them. Brody's father, Commander Osborn attempts to hold off an advancing Gamera to no avail. The children encounter the adult kaiju, Jiger, but are rescued by Tazaki and Emiko's team. Jiger surfaces, beginning a rampage in pursuit of the children, before Gamera descends. In the fight, the military attacks both monsters, but Boco realizes Gamera is protecting them. At Boco's urging, Brody convinces his father to focus on Jiger; a recovered Gamera finishes Jiger off before departing. The children are taken back to the military base, where Brody's father angrily slaps him for his recklessness. Meanwhile, another kaiju in the depths of the South Pacific.
3	3	"Run Silent, Run Deep"; Transliteration: "Fukaku Shizuka ni Senkō Seyo" (Japanese: 深く静かに潜航せよ)	Hiroyuki Seshita	Unknown	September 7, 2023
Tazaki and Emiko talk the children's parents into allowing them to accompany an investigation at Yonaguni Island. Meanwhile, the ray-like kaiju, Zigra, begins attacking ships out at sea. On the voyage, the nerdish Junichi becomes enthused at the advanced technology, bonding with Emiko. After sharing her theories, Junichi becomes saddened to overhear Brody talking to her friends about her eccentricities. The ship is soon attacked by Zigra, and Tazaki undergoes a claustrophobic panic attack. Gamera arrives and fights Ziga, but is incapacitated. However, Gamera releases a shockwave and radio signal which disorients Zigra. Realizing this, Junichi convinces the captain to reach a nearby island's radio station, with the support of her friends. Reaching the island, the children are pursued by Zigra, who climbs onto land. Junichi and the team reach the tower, where she and Emiko work on transmitting the same signal Gamera is emitting. Gamera re-emerges, and finishes the disoriented Zigra off. The next day, the team continues the journey to Yonaguni, and learn that the monsters are powered by an element known as "Orylium."
4	4	"KILL"; Transliteration: "Kiru" (Japanese: 斬る)	Hiroyuki Seshita	Unknown	September 7, 2023
On Okinawa Island, it is discovered the kaiju samples are healing due to being in proximity to the Orylium crystals. Tazaki considers quitting after being shaken by Zigra's attack, and his belief the Board is keeping important information from him. Samples are being collected by Zigra's body, the blade-faced kaiju Guiron soon attacks. Devouring Zigra's remains, Guiron builds on its own mass. At the Eustace mining base, Joe becomes suspicious of the facility. Emiko takes the children to a cave, revealing the mummified squid-like kaiju, Viras. Joe becomes increasingly suspicious, but leaves after an argument with Boco. Afterwards, Boco talks to Brody about Joe's troubled past, regarding the deaths of his mother and brother. Guiron soon attacks the island, as the children meet back up. Gamera returns and faces Guiron. When Gamera gets his arm severed, Boco feels Gamera's pain, realizing he has a psychic connection to Gamera. The children end up reaching the cavern as Gamera kills Guiron, but is left injured; Boco touches an Orylium crystal and experiences a vision.
5	5	"The Moon is a Harsh Mistress"; Transliteration: "Tsuki ha Mujihi na Yoru no Jo-ō " (Japanese: 月は無慈悲な夜の女王)	Hiroyuki Seshita	Niisan Takahashi	September 7, 2023
Boco and his friends discover that the kaiju are engineered bioweapons created by an extinct but advanced ancient civilization who seeks to wipe out humanity and start anew. To control the kaiju, they sacrifice children with a specific genetic code. And Boco carries this code, explaining his link to Gamera, who was also created to wiped out humanity but it was altered to be a protector by a defector back then. The Eustace Foundation was found by the successors of the ancient civilizations. When Boco and his friends are imprisoned. Emiko is revealed to be the niece of one of the board's leaders, Nora Melchiorri, and has lured the children into a trap. Emiko plans to awaken Viras and usurp her aunt. Tazaki helps the children reach an evacuation shuttle. Viras awakens, pursuing the shuttle as it launches, and the still injured Gamera battles Viras. Gamera bisects Viras as it attacks the shuttle, but the ship is heavily damaged. The children and Tazaki enter the escape pods, but Joe seemingly sacrifices himself to pull the lever, and is left to crash into the atmosphere. Gamera catches the pod as it falls to Earth, and the children wake up beside the unconscious Gamera.
6	6	"Childhood's end" Transliteration: "Yōnen-ki no Owari" (Japanese: 幼年期の終わり)	Hiroyuki Seshita	Unknown	September 7, 2023
Months prior, a hybrid Gyaos was engineered by the Eustace Foundation's board; in the present, this specimen emerges following Viras' death, devouring Emiko and then Viras' corpse. On the beach, Boco mourns Joe, before Tazaki to reach out to the Prime Minister, to help revive Gamera against the kaiju. As the mutated "S-Gyaos" advances, military and government forces set up defenses for Gamera. The S-Gyaos arrives and pursues Boco; through their link, Boco's adrenaline speeds Gamera's recovery. Gamera fights and kills the S-Gyaos, but is infected by its RNA virus. The Eustace Board attempts to use the virus to brainwash Gamera. With Boco's urging, Gamera resists the virus, and destroys the Board. Gamera is drained of power and crumbles to dust, to Boco's grief. Returning to their homes and families, the children try to carry on, though Boco mourns Joe. Tazaki later shows the children an uncovered egg, with a hatchling looking exactly like Gamera. In a mid credits scene, Tazaki uses the Orylium to create and distribute iPhone-like devices; in the children's tree house, a still living Joe sends a message to their radio.

== Tie-in media ==
=== Novelization ===
Official novelization of the series consisting of two parts by Hiroyuki Seshita and Jin have been published in August 2023 and May 2024 respectively.

=== Manga ===
A prequel manga, GAMERA Rebirth Code Thyrsos, illustrated by Cambria Bakuhatsutarō began serialization on Kadokawa Shoten's Young Ace UP website on September 8, 2023. The prequel is licensed in English by Titan Comics.

No.	Release date	ISBN
1	December 28, 2023	978-4-04-114243-1
2	February 4, 2025	978-4-04-115274-4

=== Collaborations ===
An official collaboration with the mobile game Godzilla Battle Line was made, featuring Gamera, Gyaos, and Guiron as playable characters. "Godzilla Earth", the Godzilla incarnation from Hiroyuki Seshita's anime trilogy, was chosen for the key art of the collaboration.

Additional collaborations include the kaiju brawler game GigaBash, Ao Oni Online (Note: The game has previously collaborated with the 2021 film The Great Yokai War: Guardians to feature Daimajin, the character re-developed from the Gamera franchise, and Gamera appeared in the film's spinoff prequel novel.) of the Ao Oni series, Odekake Kozame, Nights with a Cat. Union Arena, and the sake brand Shinkame, where the both represent "godly turtles".

== Reception ==
Insufficiency of budget and schedule has been pointed out; 3D models of humans are poor and do not fit in with 2D backgrounds. It also lacks an opening animation which is a common feature of Japanese anime. Additionally, as aforementioned, fighting scenes were declined to the half or even less (20%) of what Seshita originally intended where it was very difficult to add kaiju battles in every episode due to budgetary problem. A number of abilities and characteristics of kaiju were also eventually not used.

Bloody Disgusting's Paul Lê criticized the animation but praised the characters. He called the animation "awkward and stiff" but felt that the visual aesthetic complimented the monster battles. Lê found the human subplot "compelling" and the series' child leads to be an improvement over the child leads of the Showa era Gamera films. Lê awarded the series four skulls out of five and praised it for being an "emotional, ambitious, and well-told story." Writing for The A.V. Club, Kayleigh Dray likewise found similar flaws in the series and likened Gamera Rebirth to Stranger Things. She praised the effort that went into its character development and friendship themes that results in characters that are "pretty damn likable." However, she criticized the animation for feeling "clunky", comparing it to a low-resolution version of The Sims and likened the characters to PlayStation 2 animations. While Dray didn't consider the series to be bingeable or a must-watch, she awarded the series a C+.

Joshua Kristian McCoy from GameRant did not consider Gamera Rebirth to be an "ideal" introduction for newcomers. McCoy also criticized the animation for being "jittery" and compared it to the animation from Robot Chicken, and found the concept to be flawed; he specifically targeted the series' tone and its depressing climax, calling them improper for a Gamera story. He concluded by ridiculing the creators for taking inspiration from Godzilla Singular Point instead of Shin Godzilla, stating that the series starts "rough, gets weird, and ends almost impressively poorly." James Beckett from Anime News Network scored the series a C+, commenting that "it's a shame that the ugliness of visuals will likely turn away a good many potential fans because underneath all of that jank is a solid kaiju adventure". Masaki Tsuji, who had previously joined publications and music of the franchise, positively reviewed the series for its variety of fighting sequences and uniqueness of human characters.

Fussa City and Tsushima Island were elected for one of Anime Pilgrimage Sites of 2024 by the Anime Tourism Association as Gamera battled Gyaos and Jiger in the former, and fought against Zigra at the Tsushima Omega Station.

Ryan Bartley, who voiced Boco in the English edition was nominated for the 2023 Voice Arts Awards.

== Potential sequel ==
The series' production committee (jp), including the director and other executives, is willing to produce additional seasons with more budgets and increased fighting scenes, though its future is uncertain. Seshita noted that he has enough ideas for up to five seasons, including returns of classic antagonists (especially Barugon), and mentioned the possibility of a future live-action adaptation if the series is successful. Seshita also hopes the series to eventually become a stepping stone for the recovery of the character's public recognition and the revival of the franchise in the future.
