= Giant Gorg =

Japanese anime television series

巨神ゴーグ (Kyoshin Gorg)
- Genre: Action, Mecha, Sci-fi
- Created by: Yoshikazu Yasuhiko
- Anime television series
- Directed by: Yoshikazu Yasuhiko
- Produced by: Takayuki Yoshii
- Written by: Masaki Tsuji; Yumiko Tsukamoto
- Music by: Mitsuo Hagita
- Studio: Nippon Sunrise
- Licensed by: NA: Discotek Media
- Original network: TV Tokyo
- Original run: April 5, 1984 – September 27, 1984
- Episodes: 26

Giant Gorg (巨神ゴーグ (ジャイアントゴーグ), Jaianto Gōgu) is a 1984, 26-episode anime television series. It was directed by Yoshikazu Yasuhiko, produced by Sunrise, and broadcast on TV Tokyo.

== Plot ==
In 1990, an island emerged about two thousand kilometers south-east of the country of Samoa. It was named New Austral Island because of its close proximity to Austral Island. However, due to a secret concerning the new landmass, an organization called GAIL covered up its existence. Though absent from the map, it was still very much afloat. As part of the cover-up, Dr. Tagami, a university professor obsessed with the island, was killed.

In his will, he instructed his son, Yuu Tagami to meet with his former student, Dr. Wave, in New York. Shortly after Yuu arrives, he, Dr. Wave, Doris (Dr. Wave's sister), and their dog, Argos, are attacked by GAIL. They escape with the help of Skipper, an old friend of Dr. Wave's who Doris describes as "a bad guy." With Skipper's help, they make their way to Austral Island. There Yuu is saved by a seemingly sentient robot called Gorg that the locals believe is the island's protector. The story unfolds from there, as Yuu, Gorg, and their friends try to uncover the secrets of New Austral Island while fighting off the forces of GAIL.

== Cast ==
Character	Japanese VA
Yuu Tagami	Mayumi Tanaka
Doris Wave	Kazumi Amemiya
Dr. Wave	Keaton Yamada
Skipper	Masao Imanishi
Rod Balboa	Shuuichi Ikeda
Lady Lynx	Gara Takashima
Manon	Mitsuo Gunji
Aroi	Asami Mukaidono
Sarah	Naomi Jinbo (1-7), Yuko Sasaki (8-26)
Roy Balboa	Yuzuru Fujimoto
Samuel Gotoh	Masayuki Kato
Bem	Kouji Totani
Sam	Shunsuke Takamiya
Zenon	Bin Shimada
Odonneru	Daisuke Gouri
Tomeniku	Fumihiko Tachiki
Professor Tagami	Koichi Chiba
Dr. Hekkeru	Masaharu Satou
Hotsumatsua	Masanobu Okubo
Jeff	Mitsuo Senda
Devi	Saburo Kamei

== Staff ==
- Planning and Production: Nippon Sunrise
- Producer: Takayuki Yoshii
- Original Concept: Hajime Yatate
- Original Story, Director, and Character Designer: Yoshikazu Yasuhiko
- Mechanical Designers: Hajime Sato, Mamoru Nagano
- Music: Mitsuo Hagita
- Art Director: Hidetoshi Kaneko
- Director of Photography: Masayoshi Miyakojima
- Sound Director: Koichi Chiba
- Chief Unit Director: Norio Kashima
- Teleplay: Masaki Tsuji, Yumiko Tsukamoto
- Unit Directors & Storyboard Artists: Yoshikazu Yasuhiko, Mamoru Hamatsu, Eikichi Ojika, Norio Kashima, Takayuki Yoshinaga, Kazuhito Kikuchi
- Animation Directors: Yoshikazu Yasuhiko, Tsukasa Dokite
- Color Key: Shoji Kumabe
- Editors: Kazuo Inoue, Yuko Watase

== Release ==
In 2001, Bandai announced that they would start a new sub label under the title Sunrise Classic Action, in which Giant Gorg would be part of. However, the plan was later scrapped.

In 2015, Discotek Media announced that they had licensed the series for a North American release on DVD. On August 3, 2024, Discotek revealed that they will re-release the series on Blu-ray in 2024.

== Legacy ==
Giant Gorg and Mobile Suit Gundam: Cucuruz Doan's Island, another work by Yasuhiko, had influences on the character designs for the Netflix series Gamera Rebirth, due to the director Hiroyuki Seshita being an admirer of the former, and Atsushi Tamura's involvement in the latter.
