= Atsushi Miyauchi =

Japanese actor and voice actor

- Born: July 8, 1969 (age 57); Saitama, Japan
- Occupations: Actor, voice actor
- Years active: 1991–present
- Notable work: One Piece as Vinsmoke Niji; JoJo's Bizarre Adventure: Golden Wind as Cioccolata
- Height: 1.77 m (5 ft 9 1/2 in)

Atsushi Miyauchi (宮内 敦士, Miyauchi Atsushi; born July 8, 1969) is a Japanese actor and voice actor. He is the best known dubbing roles as Bruce Banner / Hulk (played by Mark Ruffalo) in the Marvel Cinematic Universe.

== Filmography ==
=== Film ===
- MUSASHI (1996) (Miyamoto Musashi)
- Samurai Resurrection (2003) (Tokugawa Iemitsu)

=== Television drama ===
- Yoshitsune (2005) (Satō Tsugunobu)
- Kitaro ga Mita Gyokusai - Mizuki Shigeru no Senso (2007) (Mizumoto)
- Clouds Over the Hill (2009) (Shigeta Fujii)
- Bloody Monday (2010) (Taneda)
- GeGeGe no Nyōbō (2010) (Company commander)
- Yae's Sakura (2013) (Miyabe Teizō)

=== Television animation ===
- Detective Conan (2001) (Takeichi Tonomura)
- Darker than Black (2007) (Richard Lau)
- Kekkaishi (2007) (Masamori Sumimura)
- Yakushiji Ryōko no Kaiki Jikenbo (2008) (Mishiba)
- Battle Spirits: Shounen Toppa Bashin (2009) (Leon)
- Eden of the East (2009) (Daiju Mononobe)
- Night Raid 1931 (2010) (Kuse)
- SD Gundam Sangokuden Brave Battle Warriors (2010) (Lu Bu Tallgeese)
- The Tatami Galaxy (2010) (Ramen stall owner)
- Nura: Rise of the Yokai Clan (2011) (Akagappa)
- Code:Breaker (2012) (Abe)
- Eureka Seven: AO (2012) (Soga)
- Lupin the Third: The Woman Called Fujiko Mine (2012) (Hijacker A)
- The Prince of Tennis (2012) (Nyūdō Mifune)
- Yu-Gi-Oh! Arc-V (2014) (Strong Ishijima)
- Snow White with the Red Hair (2016) (The King)
- One Piece (Vinsmoke Niji) (2017)
- Boogiepop and Others (Shinpei Kuroda (2019)
- JoJo's Bizarre Adventure: Golden Wind (Cioccolata) (2019)
- Argonavis from BanG Dream! (Kenzō Hakkōda) (2020)
- Sorcerous Stabber Orphen: Battle of Kimluck (Pope Ramonirok) (2021)
- Megalobox 2: Nomad (Mack) (2021)
- Lupin the 3rd Part 6 (Colonel Daidoji) (2021)
- Reborn as a Vending Machine, I Now Wander the Dungeon (Director Bear) (2023)
- Helck (Rafaed) (2023)
- Metallic Rouge (Ash Stahl) (2024)
- The Elusive Samurai (Kō no Moronao) (2024)
- Kinnikuman: Perfect Origin Arc (Sneagator) (2025)
- Yaiba: Samurai Legend (Raizou Mine) (2025)
- Teogonia (Vegin) (2025)

=== Theatrical animation ===
- Eden of the East: The King of Eden (2009) (Daiju Mononobe)
- Eden of the East: Paradise Lost (2010) (Daiju Mononobe)
- Ghost in the Shell: Arise (2013) (Mamuro)
- Ghost in the Shell: The Movie (2015) (Mamuro)
- Mobile Suit Gundam: Cucuruz Doan's Island (2022) (Egba Atler)

=== ONA ===
- Bastard!! -Heavy Metal, Dark Fantasy-: Eddie the Lich (2022)

=== OVA ===
- Mobile Suit Gundam Unicorn (2010) (Norm Basilicock)
- Hanayaka Nari, Waga Ichizoku: Kinetograph (2012) (Tadashi Miyanomori)

=== Video games ===
- Ni no Kuni: Sindbah (Zerugasu)
- Granblue Fantasy: Vice Admiral Gandharva
- Time Travelers：Sōma Kamiya
- Shin Megami Tensei IV: Apocalypse: Odin
- Dynasty Warriors 8: Xtreme Legends：Yu Jin
- Dynasty Warriors 9: Yu Jin
- League of Legends：Yone
- Warriors Orochi 4: Yu Jin
- Shin Megami Tensei V: Odin
- Stranger of Paradise: Final Fantasy Origin: Ash
- Ghost of Tsushima: Strawhead Ronin
- Ghost of Yōtei: Oni
- Marvel Tōkon: Fighting Souls: Hulk

=== Dubbing roles ===
==== Live-action ====
- Mark Ruffalo
  - The Avengers (Bruce Banner / The Hulk)
  - Iron Man 3 (Bruce Banner)
  - Now You See Me (Dylan Rhodes)
  - Avengers: Age of Ultron (Bruce Banner / The Hulk)
  - Spotlight (Michael Rezendes)
  - Now You See Me 2 (Dylan Rhodes)
  - Thor: Ragnarok (Bruce Banner / The Hulk)
  - Avengers: Infinity War (Bruce Banner / The Hulk)
  - Avengers: Endgame (Bruce Banner / The Hulk)
  - Shang-Chi and the Legend of the Ten Rings (Bruce Banner)
  - The Adam Project (Louis Reed)
  - Now You See Me: Now You Don't (Dylan Shrike)
  - Spider-Man: Brand New Day (Bruce Banner / The Hulk)
- Christian Bale
  - American Hustle (Irving Rosenfeld)
  - Exodus: Gods and Kings (Moses)
  - The Big Short (Michael Burry)
  - Hostiles (Captain Joseph J. Blocker)
  - Vice (Dick Cheney)
  - Mowgli: Legend of the Jungle (Bagheera)
  - Ford v Ferrari (Ken Miles)
- Karl Urban
  - The Chronicles of Riddick (Lord Vaako)
  - Star Trek (Leonard McCoy)
  - Almost Human (Detective John Kennex)
  - Riddick (Siberius Vaako)
  - Star Trek Into Darkness (Leonard McCoy)
  - Pete's Dragon (Gavin)
  - Star Trek Beyond (Leonard McCoy)
  - The Boys (Billy Butcher)
- Gerard Butler
  - Olympus Has Fallen (Mike Banning)
  - London Has Fallen (Mike Banning)
  - Angel Has Fallen (Mike Banning)
  - Greenland (John Garrity)
  - Copshop (Bob Viddick)
  - Kandahar (Tom Harris)
- Tom Hardy
  - Lawless (Forrest Bondurant)
  - The Drop (Bob Saginowski)
  - Child 44 (Leo Demidov)
  - Mad Max: Fury Road (2019 THE CINEMA edition) (Max Rockatansky)
  - Dunkirk (Farrier)
  - The Bikeriders (Johnny Davis)
- 12 Years a Slave (Edwin Epps (Michael Fassbender))
- Agatha Christie's Poirot (George Abernethie (Michael Fassbender))
- Agora (Ammonius (Ashraf Barhom))
- Aladdin (Hakim (Numan Acar))
- The Art of Getting By (Dustin Mason (Michael Angarano))
- Bad Country (Bud Carter (Willem Dafoe))
- Beast (Martin Battles (Sharlto Copley))
- The Blacklist (Donald Ressler (Diego Klattenhoff))
- Boardwalk Empire (Nelson Van Alden (Michael Shannon))
- The Bourne Legacy (Vendel (Corey Stoll))
- The Bridge (Steven Linder (Thomas M. Wright))
- Burn Notice (Nate Westen (Seth Peterson))
- Captain America: The First Avenger (James Montgomery Falsworth (JJ Feild))
- Captain Phillips (Commander Frank Castellano (Yul Vazquez))
- Contagion (Alan Krumwiede (Jude Law))
- CSI: Miami (Jesse Cardoza (Eddie Cibrian))
- Dawn of the Planet of the Apes (Malcolm (Jason Clarke))
- Extant (Dr. John Woods (Goran Višnjić))
- The Fortress (Lee Shi-baek (Park Hee-soon))
- A Good Day to Die Hard (Mike Collins (Cole Hauser))
- Good Night, and Good Luck (Joseph Wershba (Robert Downey Jr.))
- The Gray Man (Laszlo Sosa (Wagner Moura))
- The Great Wall (Pedro Tovar (Pedro Pascal))
- Gulliver's Travels (Horatio (Jason Segel))
- Guy Ritchie's The Covenant (Col. Vokes (Jonny Lee Miller))
- The Hateful Eight (Joe Gage / Grouch Douglas (Michael Madsen))
- Hearts Beat Loud (Frank Fisher (Nick Offerman))
- Hitman: Agent 47 (Antoine Le Clerq (Thomas Kretschmann))
- The Hollars (John Hollar (John Krasinski))
- Hustle (Michael Stone (Adrian Lester))
- I Feel Pretty (Ethan (Rory Scovel))
- Imagine Me & You (Cooper "Coop" (Darren Boyd))
- Imposters (Patrick (Stephen Bishop))
- Inkheart (Mortimer "Mo" Folchart (Brendan Fraser))
- Intelligence (Gabriel Vaughn (Josh Holloway))
- iZombie (Ravi Chakrabarti (Rahul Kohli))
- John Carter (John Carter (Taylor Kitsch))
- Jungle Cruise (Aguirre (Édgar Ramírez))
- King Kong (Captain Englehorn (Thomas Kretschmann))
- Last Knights (Emperor (Peyman Moaadi))
- The Many Saints of Newark (Johnny Soprano (Jon Bernthal))
- Mary & George (James VI and I (Tony Curran))
- Mission: Impossible – Ghost Protocol (Marius Wistrom (Samuli Edelmann))
- New Heart (Choi Kang-guk (Cho Jae-hyun))
- Nope (Antlers Holst (Michael Wincott))
- The Nutcracker and the Four Realms (Benjamin Stahlbaum (Matthew Macfadyen))
- Om Shanti Om (Om Prakash Makhija / Om Kapoor (Shah Rukh Khan))
- One Missed Call (Detective Jack Andrews (Edward Burns))
- Paul, Apostle of Christ (Luke (Jim Caviezel))
- The Perfect Guy (Carter Duncan / Robert Adams (Michael Ealy))
- Premium Rush (Bobby Monday (Michael Shannon))
- The Promise (Kunlun (Jang Dong-gun))
- Ra.One (Shekhar / G. One (Shah Rukh Khan))
- The Raven (Inspector Emmett Fields (Luke Evans))
- The Recall ("The Hunter" (Wesley Snipes))
- Riddick (Santana (Jordi Mollà))
- Sand Castle (Staff Sergeant Harper (Logan Marshall-Green))
- SEAL Team 8: Behind Enemy Lines (Case (Lex Shrapnel))
- Seeking Justice (Simon/Eugene Cook (Guy Pearce))
- Shot Caller (Jacob "Money" Harlon (Nikolaj Coster-Waldau))
- The Stand (Stu Redman (James Marsden))
- Suicide Squad (Colonel Rick Flag (Joel Kinnaman))
- The Suicide Squad (Rick Flag (Joel Kinnaman))
- Taking Lives (Joseph Paquette (Olivier Martinez))
- Taxi Driver (2007 DVD edition) (Travis Bickle (Robert De Niro))
- Terminator Salvation (Barnes (Common))
- This Is Us (Jack Pearson (Milo Ventimiglia))
- Train to Busan (Homeless Man (Choi Gwi-hwa))
- Transformers: Revenge of the Fallen (Graham (Matthew Marsden))
- Transformers: Dark of the Moon (Neil Armstrong (Don Jeanes))
- Top Gun (2005 NTV edition) (Lt. Bill "Cougar" Cortell (John Stockwell))
- The Veil (Jim Jacobs (Thomas Jane))
- Vice (Roy (Thomas Jane))
- V.I.P. (Park Jae-hyuk (Jang Dong-gun))
- White House Down (Emil Stenz (Jason Clarke))
- Winchester (Eric Price (Jason Clarke))

==== Animation ====
- The Little Prince (The Young Aviator)
- Sinbad: Legend of the Seven Seas (Proteus)
- What If...? (Hulk / Bruce Banner)
