= Lucien Dodge =

American voice actor

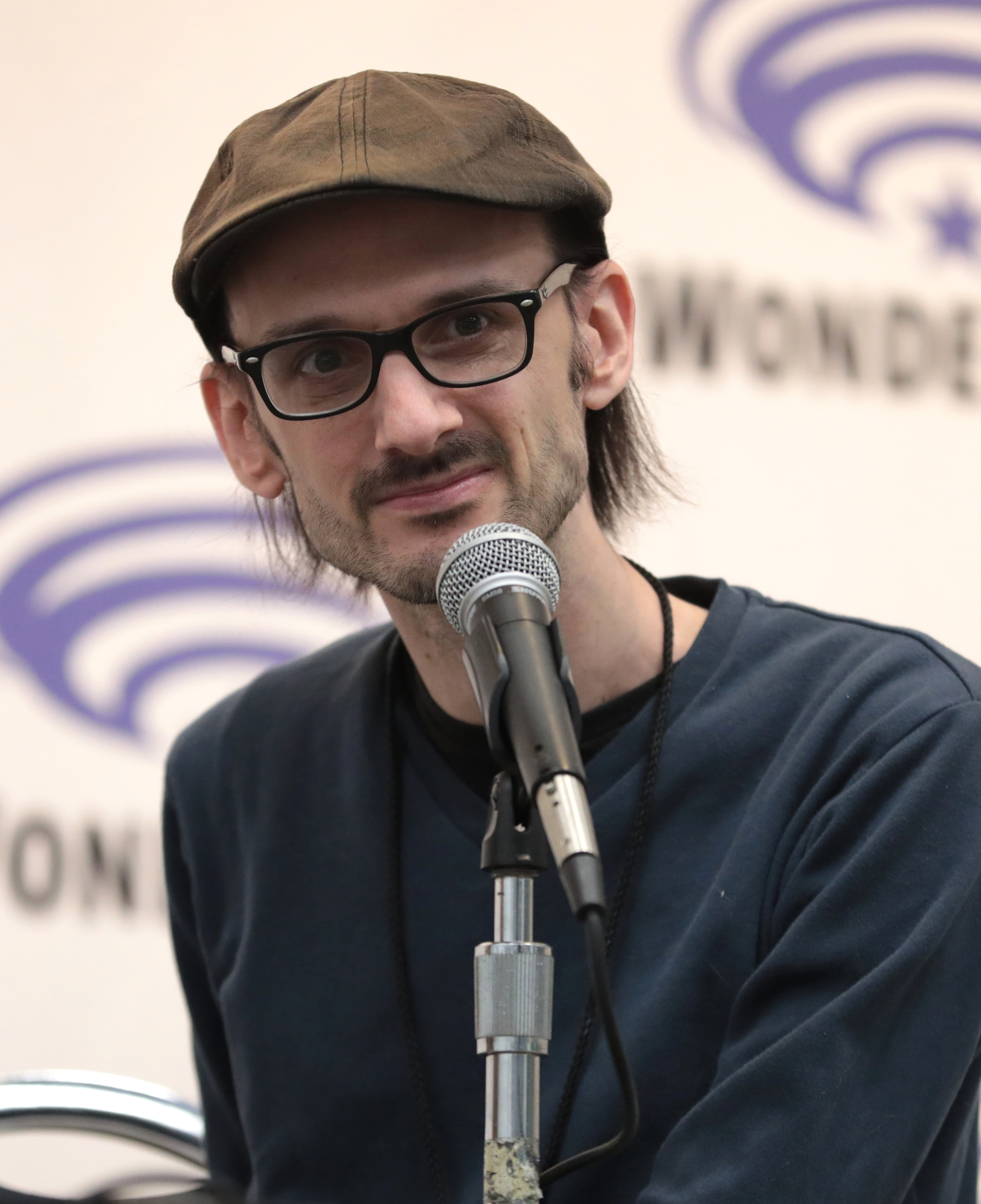
- Dodge at the 2023 WonderCon
- Born: June 24, 1984 (age 42) (Note: Dodge's birthday is on June 24, and he states that he was 28 in July 2012. His full birth date, June 24, 1984, is calculated from these two statements.)
- Occupation: Voice actor
- Agent: Abrams Artists Agency
- Partner: Erica Mendez

Lucien Dodge (born June 24, 1984) is an American voice actor who does work in animation, anime, and video games. He is mostly known for his characters in anime such as Waver Velvet in Fate/Zero, Maron and Chili in Pokémon, K1-B0 in Danganronpa V3: Killing Harmony, Yuma Kokohead in Master Detective Archives: Rain Code, Takumu Mayuzumi in Accel World, the title character of the video game Dust: An Elysian Tail, Mahito and Takuma Ino in Jujutsu Kaisen, Metphies in Godzilla: Planet of the Monsters, Godzilla: City on the Edge of Battle, and Godzilla: The Planet Eater, and Akaza in Demon Slayer. He has also read for audio books for Live Oak Media. Dodge has appeared on voice acting panels at T-Mode, Otakon, and NohCon, has been a special guest teacher at NYU, and had appeared at the National Audio Theater Festival for six consecutive years. He lives in Los Angeles, California, in an apartment with his partner, Erica Mendez. They have been together for about twelve years as of 2022. He has been heard in commercials endorsing products such as Pop Tarts, Minute Maid, Verizon Wireless, Kellogg's and Chevrolet.

== Filmography ==
=== Anime ===
- Accel World – Takumu Mayuzumi (Cyan Pile)
- Aggretsuko – Additional Voices
- Ajin: Demi-Human – Masumi Okuyama
- Aldnoah.Zero – Yutaro Tsumugi
- The Asterisk War - Shuma Sakon
- B-Daman Crossfire – Takakura
- Bleach – Yukio Hans Vorarlberna
- Blood Lad – Akim Papradon
- Boruto: Naruto Next Generations – Sekiei
- Bungo Stray Dogs – Kenji Miyazawa
- Carole & Tuesday – Spencer
- Cells at Work! – Neutrophil U-2626
- Charlotte - Jojiro Takajo
- Demon Slayer: Kimetsu no Yaiba - Akaza
- Fate/stay night: Unlimited Blade Works – Lord El-Melloi II (Ep. 25)
- Fate/strange Fake – Lord El-Melloi II
- Fate/Zero – Waver Velvet
- God Eater - Kōta Fujiki
- Gosick – Ambrose
- Glitter Force - Jared, Cop
- Hi Score Girl – Kotaro Miyao, Koharu's Father, Guile
- Hunter × Hunter 2011 series – Katzo (Ep. 1), Man A (ep2), Matthew (ep2), Imori, Sedokan
- ID-0 - Elder Urakuo Hakubi, Commander
- JoJo's Bizarre Adventure: Diamond Is Unbreakable - Toshikazu Hazamada
- Jujutsu Kaisen - Mahito, Takuma Ino
- K – Adolf K. Weismann (Silver King), Tatara Totsuka, Masaomi Dewa
- Kill la Kill – Jiro Suzaku (Ep. 14), Kenta Sakuramiya (Ep. 14), Additional Voices
- Kuroko's Basketball - Kōichi Kawahara
- Inazuma Eleven Ares - Heath Moore, Valentin Eisner
- Little Witch Academia - Andrew Hanbridge
- Magi: The Labyrinth of Magic – Ja'far
- Mobile Suit Gundam: Iron-Blooded Orphans - Norba Shino
- Mobile Suit Gundam SEED - Sai Argyle (NYAV Post dub)
- Mobile Suit Gundam: The Origin - Amuro Ray
- Naruto Shippuden – Additional Voices
- Odd Taxi – Eiji Kakihana
- Pokémon – Chili, Maron, Thomas
- Pokémon Origins – Blue
- Sailor Moon – Zoisite, Motoki Furuhata (Viz dub)
- Sailor Moon Crystal – Zoisite, Motoki Furuhata
- The Seven Deadly Sins – Simon
- Sword Art Online – Keita (Ep. 3)
- Talentless Nana – Rentarō Tsurumigawa
- Tiger & Bunny – Isaac, Kotetsu T. Kaburagi (Young), Additional Voices
- Tokyo Revengers – Keisuke Baji, Ran Haitani

=== Animation ===
- The Backwater Gospel – Minister, Fearful Townsperson
- Hanazuki: Full of Treasures – Junior
- Heaven Official's Blessing – Fu Yao, Mu Qing (English version)
- Screechers Wild - Xander
- Speed of Magic – Nello
- Stitch & Ai – Qian Dahu, Wendy Pleakley
- Surface – Nathaniel Jenson
- Tree Fu Tom – Tom (US version)
- True Tail: School of Heroes – Caleb the cat
- Willy and the Guardians of the Lake (animated series) - Willy (US version)
- XIN – Kiz
- YooHoo to the Rescue – Roodee

=== Films ===
- Barbie Star Light Adventure - Pupcorn
- Batman Unlimited: Mechs vs. Mutants – Damian Wayne/Robin
- Demon Slayer: Kimetsu no Yaiba the Movie: Mugen Train – Akaza
- Demon Slayer: Kimetsu no Yaiba – The Movie: Infinity Castle – Akaza
- Jujutsu Kaisen 0 – Takuma Ino
- Naruto Shippuden the Movie: The Lost Tower – Sarai
- Willy and the Guardians of the Lake – Willy (US version)
- Godzilla: Planet of the Monsters – Metphies
- Godzilla: City on the Edge of Battle - Metphies
- Godzilla: The Planet Eater - Metphies

=== Video games ===
- Aquaria – The Creator
- Arena of Valor – Tulen, Omen, Krizzix
- Backstage Pass – Lloyd Newton
- Bravely Default – Victor S. Court
- Code Vein - Male player character voice 1
- Cookie Run: Kingdom – Clover Cookie
- Daemon X Machina – Bishop
- Dance Central 2 – Kerith
- Dance Central 3 – Kerith
- Danganronpa: Trigger Happy Havoc – Hifumi Yamada
- Danganronpa V3: Killing Harmony – K1-B0
- Demon Slayer: Kimetsu no Yaiba – The Hinokami Chronicles – Kazumi, Akaza
- Diablo III: Reaper of Souls – Monster Voice Effects
- Dies Irae: Phantatiom Elements – Claude Alexandros Belthasar III
- Disney Infinity – Additional voices
- Dust: An Elysian Tail – Dust, Jin, Cassius
- Dynasty Warriors 8 – Li Dian
- Fallout 76: Wastelanders – Aries, AshTrey, Registration Guard, Roper
- Fire Emblem Echoes: Shadows of Valentia - Leon
- Fire Emblem Heroes - Leon, Naesala
- Fire Emblem: Three Houses - Felix
- Fire Emblem Warriors: Three Hopes – Felix
- Food Fantasy - Zongzi, Raindrop Cake, Cassata, Popcorn
- Guilty Gear Xrd – Sin Kiske
- Guilty Gear Strive – Sin Kiske
- Heileen 2: The Hands of Fate – Black, Morgan, Otto
- Heroes of Newerth – Cupid, Grinex the Riftstalker, Tetra
- Inazuma Eleven – Jude Sharp, Steve Grim, Sam Kincaid, Byron Love
- Jujutsu Kaisen: Cursed Clash – Mahito
- League of Legends – Mega Gnar
- Mad Max – Buzzard, Additional voices
- MapleStory – Male Xenon
- MapleStory 2 – Male Wizard
- Master Detective Archives: Rain Code – Yuma Kokohead
- Mega Man Star Force Legacy Collection – Arthur C. Eos, Hunter-VG
- Monster Hunter Rise - Hojo
- Octopath Traveler - Additional voices
- Pac-Man and the Ghostly Adventures – Blinky, Skeebo
- Paladins – Pip, Lex (L-Exo Suit Skin)
- Persona 3 Reload – Akinari Kamiki
- Raidou Remastered: The Mystery of the Soulless Army – Narumi
- Re:Zero − Starting Life in Another World: The Prophecy of the Throne - Rachins
- Sequence – Caleb
- Romancing SaGa 2: Revenge of the Seven – Henry/Ranger (M)
- Shining Resonance Refrain – Jinas Aion
- Skylanders: Giants – Stadium voices
- Skylanders: Swap Force – Stadium voices
- Story of Seasons: Pioneers of Olive Town – Additional voices
- SMITE – Sylvanus (Dr. Vanus skin)
- Soulcalibur VI - Additional voices
- The Legend of Heroes: Trails of Cold Steel – Elliot Craig
- The Legend of Heroes: Trails of Cold Steel II – Elliot Craig
- The Legend of Heroes: Trails of Cold Steel III – Elliot Craig
- The Legend of Heroes: Trails of Cold Steel IV – Elliot Craig
- The Legend of Heroes: Trails into Reverie – Elliot Craig, Citizen
- Trails in the Sky 1st Chapter – Hans
- Unicorn Overlord – Mercenaries (Types A and F), additional voices
- Valkyria Chronicles IV - Forseti
- Valkyria Revolution – Gustav Mecklenburg
- Vitamin Connection – Endo
- World of Warcraft: Warlords of Draenor – Young Durotan, Additional voices

=== Live-action dubbing ===
- Violetta – Tomas, Napoleon (singing voice) (English dub)
