= Cinderella and the Secret Prince =

2018 American animated film

- Theatrical release poster
- Directed by: Lynne Southerland
- Written by: Francis Glebas; Alice Blehart; Stephanie Bursill; Russell Fung
- Based on: Cinderella by Charles Perrault
- Production company: Gold Valley Film International
- Release date: August 16, 2018
- Running time: 90 minutes
- Country: United States
- Language: English
- Budget: $20,000,000
- Box office: $12,143,896

Cinderella and the Secret Prince, also known as Cinderella 3D, is a 2018 American animated fantasy adventure film directed by Lynne Southerland from a screenplay by Francis Glebas, Alice Blehart, Stephanie Bursill and Russell Fung, based on the Brothers Grimm version of the fairytale "Cinderella". Internationally, it grossed $12,143,896 against a budget of $20,000,000.

== Premise ==
During the Royal Ball, Cinderella meets the prince in hopes of marrying him. However, he turns out to be incredibly rude and mean-spirited. She and her three mice friends then discover that the real prince has in fact been turned into a mouse by an evil witch and replaced by a fraud; now she and her mice have to rescue him and turn him back into a human before it's too late.

== Characters ==
- Cinderella (Cassandra Lee Morris) – a young and kind-hearted girl who became a servant of her stepfamily after the death of her parents. During the movie she falls in love with Alex, and she helps him get the magical ring that will return him to his human form. She turns to stone at the end of the film, and Alex uses the ring to undo the spell.
- Alex (Chris Niosi) - A prince who became a mouse when he was a small boy after the death of his parents. During the film, he falls in love with Cinderella, and is able to return to his human form with the help of a magical ring, but after Cinderella turns to stone, he uses the ring to undo the spell, resulting in him becoming a mouse again.
- Crystal (Kirsten Day) - A good fairy who at first helps Cinderella get to the royal ball at the palace, and then she helps Alex get the magical ring that will return him to his human form.
- Manny (Martin Klein) - a mouse and a good friend of Alex and Cinderella.
- Walt (Tony Azzolino) - a mouse and a good friend of Alex and Cinderella.
- Olaf (Stephen Mendel) - An evil boy who pretends to be a prince since the witch turned him into a mouse. He cooperates with the witch. During the film, he falls in love with Cinderella, but she rejects him after she discovers that he is not the real prince and is just an impersonator. He tries to kill Alex after Alex arrives at the palace in his human form, but loses the battle with him.
- Witch (Wendee Lee) - An evil witch who wants to take over the kingdom. She turned Alex into a mouse when he was a little boy after his parents died, and she brought Olaf to the palace to pretend to be a prince. During the film she tries to prevent Alex from returning to his human form, and after she fails to do so, she kidnaps Cinderella. Alex manages to save Cinderella, but when they run away from her, a spell she sends at them hits Cinderella and causes her to turn to stone.
- Stepmother (Stephanie Sanditz) - Cinderella's stepmother who made her a servant to her and her two daughters. During the film she turns Cinderella over to the royal guard in exchange for money.
- Eagle (Terrence Stone) - the witch's eagle. During the movie the witch sends him to stop Alex from returning to his human form, but he fails.
- Dog - Olaf's dog. During the movie he tries to catch the mice, but he fails.
- Cat - the stepmother's cat. During the movie he tries to catch the mice, but he fails.

== See also ==
- List of American theatrical animated feature films (2000–2019)
