= Godzilla: Planet of the Monsters =

2017 Japanese animated film

- Theatrical release poster

Japanese name
- Kanji: ゴジラ怪獣惑星
Transcriptions
- Revised Hepburn: Gojira: Kaijū Wakusei
- Directed by: Kōbun Shizuno; Hiroyuki Seshita (Note: Hiroshi Shimada serves as the animation director.)
- Screenplay by: Gen Urobuchi
- Story by: Gen Urobuchi (Note: Sadayuki Murai served as the series composer alongside Urobuchi.)
- Produced by: Takashi Yoshizawa
- Starring: Mamoru Miyano; Takahiro Sakurai; Kana Hanazawa; Yūki Kaji
- Cinematography: Kousuke Kawamura (Note: Credited as Lighting & Composite Supervisor (ライティング&コンポジットスーパーバイザー).)
- Edited by: Aya Hida
- Music by: Takayuki Hattori
- Production companies: Polygon Pictures; Toho Animation
- Distributed by: Toho (Japan); Netflix (Worldwide)
- Release date: November 17, 2017 (Japan)
- Running time: 88 minutes
- Country: Japan
- Language: Japanese
- Box office: $3.3 million

Godzilla: Planet of the Monsters (ゴジラ怪獣惑星, Gojira Kaijū Wakusei) (Note: Also known as Godzilla Part 1: Planet of the Monsters and Godzilla: Monster Planet for short) is a 2017 Japanese computer-animated kaiju film directed by Kōbun Shizuno and Hiroyuki Seshita. Produced by Toho Animation and Polygon Pictures, in association with Netflix, it is the 32nd film in the Godzilla franchise, the 30th Godzilla film produced by Toho, the first animated film in the franchise, and the second film in the franchise's Reiwa era. (Note: Japan's Reiwa era began on May 1, 2019, however, Toho considers Shin Godzilla and the anime trilogy as part of the Reiwa era.)

Godzilla: Planet of the Monsters follows a group of human refugees who attempt to recolonize Earth 20,000 years after the planet was taken over by Godzilla. The film was released theatrically in Japan on November 17, 2017, and was released worldwide on Netflix on January 17, 2018. It was followed by two sequels, Godzilla: City on the Edge of Battle and Godzilla: The Planet Eater, both of which were released in 2018.

== Setting ==
In the last summer of the 20th century, giant monsters began attacking Earth and humanity is driven to near extinction by one monster which eliminated the others: Godzilla. Two alien races with ulterior motives, the religious Exif (エクシフ, Ekushifu) and the technologically advanced Bilusaludo (ビルサルド, Birusarudo), came to Earth and offered their assistance against Godzilla. After the Bilusaludo's gambit with Mechagodzilla failed before it could be activated, both the aliens and humanity were forced to abandon Earth and emigrate to the exoplanet Tau Ceti e in the Tau Ceti system located within the Constellation Cetus via the interstellar emigration ship Aratrum (アラトラム号, Aratoramu-gō), while a second interstellar emigration ship known as the Oratio (オラティオ号, Oratio-gō), was sent to Kepler-452b in the Constellation Cygnus, but disappeared under mysterious circumstances. 20 years later, Aratrum is 11.9 light years from Earth and contains the remaining humans accompanied by Exif and Bilusaludo refugees.

== Plot ==
Captain Haruo Sakaki bears a seething hatred towards Godzilla, who had killed his parents during humanity's banishment and exile from Earth after 20 years in the Interstellar medium. He believes the exoplanet selected for colonization, Tau-e, is uninhabitable and tries to force the ship's central committee to rescind the order to send the elderly, including his grandfather, to scout the planet. Haruo is arrested and then witnesses the exploratory shuttle explode while entering the planet's atmosphere. He then anonymously publishes a classified essay on Godzilla's weak points provided by the Exif priest named Metphies. This sways public opinion among the population forcing the central committee into returning to Earth after deciding that they are unlikely to find another habitable world.

The Aratrum emerges from hyperspace into Earth's orbit and begins sending reconnaissance drones to scout the surface, which reveal that Godzilla is still alive. Metphies arranges Haruo's bail and he explains to the committee that Godzilla has a vulnerability. It is an electromagnetic pulse-producing organ in his body which generates an asymmetrical permeable shield making him impervious to all damage except for a short period when the organ recycles. Haruo proposes using that window to crack the shield organ and quickly implant an EMP probe into Godzilla to cause an implosion from the resulting energy buildup. He stresses that close quarters combat would be needed for accurately coordinated attacks in order to find the organ and requests a force of 600 out of the 4,000 people on board to implement the plan.

When Haruo and the landing ships with the 600 personnel from the Aratrum reach Earth's surface, they learn that almost 20,000 years have elapsed due to relativistic effects and Time Dilation, and Godzilla's presence on the planet has radically altered Earth's biosphere. They suffer losses and damage to their landing ships by new flying creatures called Servums. The remaining troops mobilize and soon encounter Godzilla. Haruo proceeds with the original plan on his own and attacks Godzilla before Leland intervenes and provoke Godzilla, his death allowing the others to learn Godzilla's weak point is his dorsal fins. Command falls to Metphies, who promotes Haruo to commander as the human convinces the remaining survivors to continue with the plan and defeat Godzilla.

The group manage to trap Godzilla within a collapsed mountain pass, where they succeed in killing the monster. However, it appears to only be an offspring and the original Godzilla, which has grown to 300m in height, emerges from beneath a nearby mountain and destroys most of the remaining crew. Trapped beneath rubble, Haruo watches Godzilla leave while vowing to kill him before losing consciousness.

In a post-credits scene, Haruo wakes up in a secluded area and sees an indigenous girl standing next to him.

== Voice cast ==
Characters	Japanese	English
Haruo Sakaki (ハルオ・サカキ)	Mamoru Miyano (adult); Aya Suzaki (child)	Chris Niosi (adult); Rachelle Heger (child)
Metphies (メトフィエス, Metofiesu)	Takahiro Sakurai	Lucien Dodge
Martin Lazzari (マーティン・ラッザリ, Mātin Razzari)	Tomokazu Sugita	Edward Bosco
Mulu Elu Galu Gu (ムルエル・ガルグ, Murueru Garugu)	Junichi Suwabe	Jamieson Price
Rilu-Elu Belu-be (リルエル・ベルベ, Rilueru Berube)	Kenta Miyake	Rich Brown
Yuko Tani (ユウコ・タニ, Yūko Tani)	Kana Hanazawa	Cristina Vee
Adam Bindewald (アダム・ビンデバルト, Adamu Bindebarudo)	Yūki Kaji	Robbie Daymond
Eliott Leland (エリオット・リーランド, Eriotto Rīrando)	Daisuke Ono	Ray Chase
Unberto Mori (ウンベルト・モーリ, Unberuto Mōri)	Kenyu Horiuchi	Keith Silverstein
Halu-Elu Dolu-do (ハルエル・ドルド, Harueru Dorudo)	Kazuya Nakai	Doug Stone
Endurphe (エンダルフ, Endarufu)	Kazuhiro Yamaji	Joe Ochman

== Production ==
In August 2016, Toho announced that an animated Godzilla film was being developed, targeted for a 2017 release. Gen Urobuchi was announced as the writer, Kobun Shizuno and Hiroyuki Seshita as the directors, and Polygon Pictures was announced as the studio that would animate the film. In January 2017, Urobuchi announced the main cast on his Twitter account. In March 2017, Toho announced that the film would be the first film in a new trilogy.

About the production, co-director Shizuno stated, "From the start, we had the blessing of Toho to not be constrained by previous entries in the franchise, and with the freedom of imagination offered by animation I feel we have come up with a cool new form for Godzilla." On Godzilla's new design, co-director Seshita stated, "With his masses of muscle fibers and unique body tissue to support his enormous bulk, this is an extraordinarily rugged-looking physique. It was an overwhelming presence that reverberated through the whole project, like a fearsome deity that even we who created it must prostrate ourselves before. That is our Godzilla." The English dub was produced by Post Haste Digital.

=== Music ===
Takayuki Hattori composed the film's soundtrack, marking it his third Godzilla film score. XAI performed the film's theme White Out.

== Release ==
=== Marketing ===
A stage event for the film was held at AnimeJapan 2017 on March 26, 2017. That same month, a teaser poster revealed that the film will be released theatrically in Japan on November 17, 2017. The film's directors attended the Annecy International Animation Film Festival to reveal more details regarding the film. In June 2017, a new poster detailing Godzilla's design was revealed with the tagline "Despair Evolves". In August 2017, a new trailer and poster were released with the tagline "Who will go extinct — humans, or Godzilla?" In September, Toho and Sanrio announced a collaborative project titled Godzilla x Hello Kitty, which featured artwork, and a 2-meter statue of Godzilla from Planet of the Monsters, on display at Gate City Osaki West Tower in Shinagawa, Tokyo. The exhibit was displayed from September 1–8.

=== Theatrical and streaming ===
Godzilla: Planet of the Monsters was theatrically released in Japan on November 17, 2017. In March 2017, it was announced that the film will be streamed in 190 countries via Netflix following the film's Japanese theatrical release. Greg Peters, President of Netflix Japan stated, "Working with the best creators such as Toho in bringing Godzilla to Netflix users in over 190 countries marks a major milestone for us". In January 2018, Netflix announced that the film will be released worldwide on their platform on January 17, 2018.

=== Box office ===
Godzilla: Planet of the Monsters reached No. 3 at the Japanese box office on its opening weekend, earning ¥103 million from 71,200 admissions within two days. By its third weekend, it had grossed ¥342,349,800 ($3,052,062). Upon its Chinese release in 2018, the film grossed CN¥1.62 million ($251,163) at the Chinese box office, bringing the film's total box office gross to $3.3 million in East Asia.

=== Critical response ===
Brian Ashcraft of the Kotaku website felt that the characters "aren't all that interesting" but did state that the "anime version of Godzilla is surprisingly effective and frightening" and that despite his complaints, the "overall experience was good" and "It's not a perfect picture, but it was a powerful proof of concept: Godzilla works as an anime." Matt Schley from The Japan Times praised the film's CG animation, stating, "even skeptics will admit the 3-D version of the king of the monsters looks pretty darn cool" but felt the film wasn't "nearly as thematically ambitious as its predecessor" and concluded by stating, "But still, with its impressive 3-D animation and action sequences, 'Planet of the Monsters' has the makings of something interesting." Callum May from Anime News Network gave the film an overall B+ rating, calling the film "not for the uninitiated". May criticized the character of Haruo as being "grating", as the film didn't allow audiences to connect with other characters but praised the animation, call it Polygon's "best-looking CG title yet" and concluded that the film "is a thrilling film that lives up to the reputation of the franchise and delivers on its science fiction premise".

Mike Cecchini from Den of Geek felt the film was "beautifully animated" but criticized the characters, feeling they weren't sympathetic or well-developed. He also felt the technological dialogue felt more like it came from a video game but concluded by stating, "But Planet of the Monsters is just so damn gorgeous to look at, and such a complete departure from what you usually expect from this world, that you should just take it all in and enjoy the surprises." Patrick Galvan from Syfy Wired called the film "dull", criticizing the lack of human drama, the poorly developed world-building, and the writing, stating, "the writing is sadly not strong enough to even work on its own terms." He concluded by stating, "With a more polished script, Godzilla: Planet of the Monsters might've been something of a modern classic. As is, it's a largely dull, impersonal product with only a few bursts of genuine interest to its name."

Jonathan Barkan from Dread Central gave the film 2 stars out of 5, feeling that the film has "great potential" but is "bland". He criticized the characters as being "forgettable", the film's lack of exploring its "imaginative opportunities", called the animation's color scheme "flat and uninteresting" and felt some of the action scenes were too shaky. He concluded by stating, "Suffice it to say that it definitely has me interested in the second and third films but I really hope that this new world will be explored further in those entries. Otherwise, we've got a fascinating foundation that will be squandered." Paul Thomas Chapman from Otaku USA called the film a "train wreck". He criticized the film for dedicating various scenes to "nonstop barrage of technobabble and exposition" and criticized the character development for not exploring the inner lives of other characters. He concluded by stating the film "is not an easy film to recommend to either casual fans or to battle-hardened kaiju otaku. But despite its (many, glaring) flaws", Chapman "enjoyed" the film regardless.

=== Home media ===
In Japan, the film was released on DVD and Blu-ray by Toho Video on May 16, 2018. It sold 5,813 Blu-ray units within its first week, and 1,784 DVD units within two weeks.

== Sequels ==
Godzilla: Planet of the Monsters is the first film in the anime trilogy. The second film in the trilogy, titled Godzilla: City on the Edge of Battle was released on May 18, 2018. The third and final film in the trilogy, titled Godzilla: The Planet Eater, was released on November 9, 2018.
