= Gamera the Brave =

2006 film by Ryūta Tasaki

- Theatrical release poster

Japanese name
- Kanji: 小さき勇者たち〜ガメラ〜
Transcriptions
- Revised Hepburn: Chiisaki Yūsha-tachi ~Gamera~
- Directed by: Ryuta Tasaki
- Written by: Yukari Tatsui
- Starring: Ryo Tomioka; Kanji Tsuda; Kaho
- Cinematography: Kazuhiro Suzuki
- Music by: Yoko Ueno
- Production company: Kadokawa Daiei Studio
- Distributed by: Shochiku
- Release date: 29 April 2006 (Japan)
- Running time: 96 minutes
- Country: Japan
- Language: Japanese
- Box office: US$2.6 million (Japan)

Gamera the Brave (小さき勇者たち〜ガメラ〜, Chiisaki Yūsha-tachi ~Gamera~; lit. 'Little Heroes: Gamera') is a 2006 Japanese kaiju film directed by Ryuta Tasaki, written by Yukari Tatsui, and produced by Kadokawa Daiei Studio. It is the twelfth and latest installment in the Gamera film series, and serves as the second reboot of the franchise, with the first being Gamera: Guardian of the Universe in 1995 (which was distributed by Toho), as well as the final installment of the Heisei-era Gamera film series. It is also the first entry in the series to be produced by Kadokawa Daiei Studio after the company purchased a percentage of the remaining assets of Daiei Film, the original studio that was responsible for making the Gamera films.

Gamera the Brave stars Ryo Tomioka, Kanji Tsuda, Kaho, and Susumu Terajima, and features Toshinori Sasaki as Toto, the newly hatched Gamera. The film was released theatrically in Japan on April 29, 2006, and was distributed by Shochiku.

== Plot ==
In 1973, Kosuke Aizawa evacuates his home in Shima, which is under attack by a swarm of man-eating bird-like creatures called the Original Gyaos until a benevolent fire-breathing turtle-like creature named Avant Gamera intervenes to buy time for the evacuation. Unable to exterminate all of the Gyaos, Gamera sacrifices himself in a self-destruct ability to end the threat of the Gyaos for good as Kosuke watches from the shores.

33 years later when Kosuke has matured into an adult, his son Toru has a fear of being left alone because he is plagued by memories of his late mother Miyuki and Kosuke having to work hard to support his family. Toru's fears are intensified when he finds his neighbor, Mai, has to undergo dangerous heart surgery. When his other friends, Katsuya and Ishimaru, take him out exploring to try and cheer him up, Toru discovers an unusual egg atop a red stone in the same place the original Gamera self-destructed decades ago. The egg, which is revealed to be Gamera's egg, hatches into a juvenile Gamera, which Toru nicknames Toto, after what Miyuki used to call Toru. Toto begins to display remarkable abilities such as high intelligence, levitation, and breathing small bursts of fire; while growing at a rapid rate.

Meanwhile, Toto quickly outgrows the house and is relocated by Toru and his friends to maintain secrecy. Toru also gives Mai the red stone he found Toto's egg on as a good luck charm for her heart surgery. However, after a storm, Toru finds Toto has left his hideaway and gone missing. Concurrently, many shipping disasters occur in the area, the cause of which is Zedus, a monstrous, man-eating mutated reptile who fed on a Gyaos corpse, and being presumably controlled by either malice, memories, or spirits of the vampiric monster.

As Zedus soon thereafter rampages through the city, and corners Toru, Kozuke, and Toru's friends, Toto, now significantly larger, intercedes, but he is wounded in the battle and gets captured by government officials. Privy to Gamera's species being benevolent creatures and knowing Zedus would return, the government has scientists who studied the original Gamera work to help heal the wounded Toto. Keeping him in a warehouse, they bandage Toto and hook Toto up to a machine which infuses him with liquid derived from mysterious red stones found in the vicinity of the original Gamera's self-destruction, which the scientists theorize give Toto their power.

Mai's surgery is successful and her mother Harumi calls Kosuke and Toru to give them the good news, but she also states that Mai keeps muttering in her sleep that Toto needs the glowing red stone. Zedus attacks again and the now near fully-grown Toto goes out to battle him to save the fleeing citizens. Toru and his friends determine that Toto must consume the red stone which Toru had found with Toto's egg, a much larger and more concentrated form of the red beads the scientists had used, in order to gain his full power. Kosuke, having seen the damage a battle can have first hand and not wanting to lose his son as he did his wife, initially opposes their efforts to get close to Toto; but comes around to help them after ensuring Katsuya and Ishimaru get to safety.

Mai tries to reach them or Toto to deliver the red stone, but her post-surgery weakness inhibits her. The red stone however, seems to connect to various human children, who come to Mai's aid and relay the stone across the city to Toru and his friends. Zedus, firmly having the upper-hand in the battle, hurls Toto into a skyscraper. Kosuke holds up the debris to help Toru get into the top of the skyscraper and Toru, after begging Toto not to sacrifice himself like his predecessor did, throws the red stone into Toto's mouth during the battle. As the power of jet-propelled flight manifests in Toto, he fires a charged-up plasma fireball attack down Zedus' throat, killing it in the process.

Toto escapes further government investigation with Toru, Kosuke, and the other children's assistance. Watching Toto fly off into the sky, Toru tearfully bids him farewell.

== Cast ==
- Ryo Tomioka as Toru Aizawa, son of Kosuke and one of the film's main protagonists.
- Kanji Tsuda as Kosuke Aizawa, Toru's father and the owner of Aizawa's Diner.
- Kaho as Mai Nishio, Toru's neighbor who has to undergo heart surgery.
- Susumu Terajima as Osamu Nishio, Mai's father and owner of Nishio Pearl Shop.
- Kaoru Okunuki as Harumi Nishio, Mai's mother.
- Shingo Ishikawa as Masaru Ishimaru, Katsuya's brother and one of Toru's friends.
- Shogo Narita as Katsuya Ishimaru, Masaru's brother and one of Toru's friends.
- Tomorô Taguchi as Councilor Yoshimitsu Hitotsugi
- Kenjirō Ishimaru as Professor Soichiro Amamiya
- Bokuzo Masana as Secretary Yuji Tobata
- Megumi Kobayashi as Miyuki Aizawa, Toru's late mother who appears in the flashback.
- Toshinori Sasaki as Toto, the newly hatched Gamera who serves as Toru's pet and one of the film's main protagonists. Toto is also portrayed by 13 African spurred tortoises as a hatchling.
  - Sasaki also portrays Avant Gamera, the predecessor of Toto and potentially the same individual as the successor, who sacrificed himself to destroy the Original Gyaos in 1973.
- Mizuho Yoshida as Zedus, a man-eating mutated reptile and the film's main antagonist. Yoshida previously portrayed Legion Queen in Gamera 2: Attack of Legion.

== Production ==
=== Connections to Heisei trilogy and pre-production ===
Despite its popularity, the Heisei Gamera trilogy was highly controversial among executives, crew of the Showa films and even crew of the trilogy itself. Showa Gamera director Noriaki Yuasa, who died two years prior to the release of Gamera the Brave, expressed his frustration with the Heisei trilogy and emphasized the importance of differentiating the franchise from Godzilla, hoping Daiei to "resurrect Showa Gamera", as he describes in 2003's The Ultimate Gamera Guide.

The Heisei trilogy's direction was shaped due to the tendencies of director Shusuke Kaneko, screenwriter Kazunori Ito and sound designer Shinji Higuchi, who were not fans of both Gamera and Heisei Godzilla continuity, and particularly the first two's motivations for the trilogy being rooted in their frustrations over unrealized opportunities to direct Ultra Q The Movie: Legend of the Stars (1990) and Godzilla vs. Mothra (1992). This resulted in their iteration of Gamera looked to evoke a Godzilla sensibility in the character. Multiple disagreements between Daiei higher-ups and Kaneko's team disrupted the production of Gamera: Guardian of the Universe with choices made by Kaneko and Ito, especially for the plot's direction detailing elements diverging from the Showa era series, deemed egregious enough to warrant the film's potential cancellation, resulting in Kaneko almost losing his position as director, and a near-resignation of Tsutomu Tsuchikawa, one of the film's leading producers. Among most notable points of contention were Gamera's ferocious and distant characterization (so as his physical design, his relationship with the humanity, and victims of kaiju disasters by Gamera), elimination of child-friendly aspects, and human-made origins (and mechanical anatomies and abilities) of kaiju.

Particularly the 1999 film Gamera 3: Revenge of Iris had garnered controversy on release, with reports stating children crying profusely at the destruction Gamera had caused in Shibuya in it, resulting in walk-outs on screenings. The proposed plot for "Gamera 4" (in which Gamera brings even further destruction to the country), (Note: The 2003 independent film GAMERA 4-TRUTH by Shinpei Hayashiya eventually used the plot of the scrapped Gamera 4.) the death of producer and company president Yasuyoshi Tokuma, alongside the financial situation of Tokuma Shoten (Note: The intercompany treaty with Nippon TV and Hakuhodo to achieve Kaneko's demand to increase budgets also reduced Tokuma Shoten's revenues.) were of the many factors behind the eventual demise of the Heisei Gamera series.

In 2002, Kadokawa acquired Daiei Film from Tokuma Shoten, with Kadokawa president Kazuo Kuroi announcing intentions to produce a Godzilla vs. Gamera film, alongside a reboot of historical tokusatsu series Daimajin. This followed a failed attempt to produce a crossover by Yasuyoshi Tokuma, prior to his death in 2000. Toho eventually turned down the offers, leading to the production of Gamera the Brave.

Daiei executives and crew of Gamera the Brave were aware of the popularity of the Heisei trilogy, Kadokawa Daiei's financial insufficiency, and the risks to fail by rebooting with a completely different series, as taking a different path from the trilogy was controversial (pros and cons were comparable within Kadokawa) where a number of stakeholders had suggested to produce either sequels to the trilogy or its prequel or a side story, or similar films. However, executives emphasized the importance to recover the ideology of the franchise, that being the mutual and cooperative relationship between the giant turtle and little folks (along with to tone down the intimidating design of Gamera), with the team's modus operandi quoted as "return Gamera to the children". Producer Yoichi Arishige mentioned that he would not participate if the film was going to become a sequel to the Heisei trilogy.

Gamera the Brave was also aimed to appeal to female audiences, who were not seen as the target audience during the Heisei trilogy era, where the increasingly manic and unbalanced direction (especially in the aforementioned third entry), didn't contribute in expanding the fanbase and, in return, merchandise sales. The lack of a broader audience triggered additional concerns among executives about the demise of the franchise among changing markets, further supporting the direction not to produce sequels to the trilogy. To achieve this, the film was also wary to avoid the "standards" of kaiju films of the Heisei era and tell its own story regardless of genre tropes, though this could also be attributed to the commercial slump of kaiju features at that point in time, examples including Godzilla: Final Wars. Positive receptions of the Heisei Mothra trilogy, and influences from Rex: A Dinosaur's Story and Helen the Baby Fox also encouraged this decision.

The script of Gamera the Brave was redeveloped from one of the original scripts of Gamera: Guardian of the Universe by Chiaki and Kazuya Konaka, which, alongside the script written by screenwriter Yoshikazu Okada, were written prior to the selection of Ito as writer. The former script, referred to by fans as "Konaka Gamera", was influenced by the 1972 Tsuburaya film Daigoro vs. Goliath, which was itself influenced by Daiei and Showa Gamera films. Though he and his brother were not chosen for the film, Konaka brothres later used elements of the unsold script in his screenwriting work on Tsuburaya's Ultraman Tiga and Toei Animation's Digimon Tamers.

Pre-production casting for Gamera the Brave (particularly for its special effect teams) was limited to crews who were not connected to the respective teams by Kaneko and Higuchi (for the Heisei trilogy), and was conducted without informing both Kaneko or Higuchi. Prior to filming, Naoki Sato, the current president of Nikkatsu, who had served as a producer for both the Heisei trilogy and Gamera the Brave, informed Shusuke Kaneko that the new film will be significantly different from the Heisei trilogy, and indirectly requested him to avoid intervening its production.

Various pieces of media had either major or minor influences on Gamera the Brave, including Helen the Baby Fox, Rex: A Dinosaur's Story, Yokai Monsters, Gorgo, King Kong, (Note: King Kong's roars, provided by voice actor Peter Cullen, were reused for Gamera in this film.) the aforementioned Heisei Mothra trilogy, The Yearling, E.T. the Extra-Terrestrial, Babe, Star Trek, (Note: The depiction of "Toto Impact", Gamera's empowered fireball at the climax to defeat Zedus, was influenced by Photon torpedoes from the Star Trek franchise.) Kamen Rider Ryuki, Sgt. Frog and Bambi, a Life in the Woods. Bambi is especially poignant, as Toto was referred to as "Bambi" during the early stages of the production.

One of novelizations, Friend: Gamera the Brave (ともだち 小さき勇者たち ~ガメラ~, Tomodachi Chiisaki Yūsha-tachi Gamera), particularly focused on expanding the film's lore by using more Showa Gamera elements, such as appearances of other Showa era kaiju that share the origin of mutations with Zedus.

=== Monster design ===
Zedus, the "Demon Sea Beast" (海魔獣, Kaimajū) closely resembles the title monster of "Giant Sea Demon" (大海魔, Daikaima), (Note: Alternatively as "Giant Demon Beast" (大魔獣, Daimajū).) a scrapped kaiju film featuring a cephalopodic monster that was conceived before the production of both the Nezura and Gamera films. Despite the film never coming to fruition, the moniker of "Giant Demon Beast" was later used in Gamera vs. Jiger for the giant turtle's opponent, an auburn mammalian reptile from the lost continent of Mu.

Zedus, aside from being an easter egg in terms of species choice and presentation, was intentionally designed after kaiju from Toho and Tsuburaya Productions, of note Godzilla and the Tristar version of the character from the 1998 American film, (Note: The cancelled live-action sequel of the Tristar film, akin to Gamera the Brave, attempted to feature civilians to protect the protagonist kaiju from a military force.) and the Ultra series kaiju Jirahs which was filmed with a repurposed Godzilla suit.

Additionally, among the film's monster designers, only Tomoo Haraguchi submitted draft designs that would evolve into the final version, while designs by others had coincidentally resembled the MUTOs, radiation-sucking beasts from Legendary Pictures' Monsterverse series. Prior to the release of the 2014 Godzilla film, in which the MUTOs first appeared, a Gamera project tentatively titled "Gamera 3D" by Yoshimitsu Banno was announced, though this would not come to fruition.

== Release ==
Prior to release, the film had collaborated with the aforementioned Helen the Baby Fox and Sgt. Frog, and additionally with Oha Suta.

The film was distributed by Shochiku instead of Toho which distributed the Heisei trilogy; theater chain insufficiency was among the major factors that afflicted Daiei Film, and the post-bankruptcy Gamera and Yokai Monsters franchises have also relied on distribution through other companies. Due to the financial condition of Daiei Film, the Gamera franchise has aimed to minimize competition against the Godzilla franchise even before the company's bankrupt in 1971, and Gamera the Brave, released after Godzilla: Final Wars, was among the cases that Gamra films were released during the temporal ceases of Godzilla franchise, when the genre's popularity itself had declined.

The film opened at No. 6 at the box office in Japan, but could not earn back its budget and exited a commercial failure.

=== Reception ===
Andrew Kasch of the website Dread Central gave the film a score of 3 1/2 out of 5, writing that "Even with its kid-centric approach, Gamera the Brave is guaranteed to please most kaiju enthusiasts, and the new franchise should be enough to fill the empty hole left in Godzilla's absence." Tom Mes of Midnight Eye called the film "an agreeable time waster that introduces the tried and true kaiju formula to a new generation", but wrote that "anyone aged 13 or over will likely be looking elsewhere for their monster movie fix".

In the years following the film's release, a hoax circulated online which claimed that a giant ancient tortoise, shown in photographs being transported on a flatbed truck, was caught in or around the Amazon River. In actuality, the tortoise shown in the photographs was a full-scale, 15-foot-long prop of Toto which was used in the film.

Shusuke Kaneko, who is aware of both criticism against him and the purpose of Gamera the Brave to fix the franchise from the Heisei trilogy, openly revealed his disfavor of the film and described it a commercial failure, and criticized it for its sequels to be cancelled, pointing the concept of the film to be "essentially wrong" for co-inserting contradicting themes to limit excitements, (Note: Protagonist kaiju to fight against antagonists, and human protagonists hope Gamera not to fight for their fears of losing Gamera.) and alleged the legitimacy of the trilogy.

- According to Kaneko, he "honestly doesn't like the movie", and reviewed it as "I admit their efforts, but its concept is unacceptable, they might have tried to redeem "Kaneko's mistakes", but it wasn't serialized after all, and I (we) weren't wrong". Kaneko also described subsequent stagnation of kaiju films were also due to box office results of Gamera the Brave and Godzilla: Final Wars, where these films and the aforementioned Heisei Mothra trilogy, and Kaneko's own Gamera and Godzilla films involved same tokusatsu crews.

=== Aftermath ===
As aforementioned, Gamera the Brave was aimed to restore the child-friendly and heroic ideology from the Heisei Gamera trilogy especially Gamera 3: Revenge of Iris, and the film received positive reviews among children and female audiences, however many of tokusatsu fans who favor the Heisei trilogy instead poorly regarded it, leading to its commercial failure. Consequently, various subsequent Gamera productions were eventually cancelled, including its sequels and anime projects (such as the ones by Cartoon Network and Yoshitomo Yonetani), Yoshimitsu Banno's Gamera 3D, and several reboot attempts in the 2010s, taking 17 years to yield the Netflix series Gamera Rebirth (2023).

Takashi Miike's Daimajin project was also cancelled in response to the aftermath of Gamera the Brave, while it was redeveloped into Daimajin Kanon. Miike's attempt to revive Daimajin eventually materialized in the 2021 film The Great Yokai War: Guardians, where Gamera also made a cameo appearance in the spinoff novel; the 2021 film is an indirect sequel of Miike's 2005 film The Great Yokai War which also made brief references to Gamera.

=== Legacy ===
The 2015 kaiju film Love & Peace was influenced by the Gamera franchise, where the film bears resemblances to Gamera the Brave and involved stakeholders of the Gamera franchise such as Kiyotaka Taguchi, Tōru Tezuka, and Nippon Eizō Creative which also participated in related Gamera, Godzilla, and Mothra films.

A number of references to the previous Gamera films, including Gamera the Brave, and scrapped Gamera projects were inserted in the 2023 Netflix animation series Gamera Rebirth. Its director Hiroyuki Seshita had previously participated in the aforementioned Rex: A Dinosaur's Story, and both Gamera productions utilized the "Konaka Gamera" script. In addition, Kazuya Nakai played both General Osborn in Gamera Rebirth and Gametarō, one of the siblings of Toto and the protagonist of Keep it up!! Gametarō (Japanese: がんばれ!! ガメ太郎, Hepburn: Ganbare Gametarō), the spinoff story of Gamera the Brave.

Castings of Kamen Rider Den-O and Kamen Rider: The Next by Ryuta Tasaki were also partially influenced by Gamera the Brave, while the casting of the 2006 Gamera film was instead influenced by the aforementioned Kamen Rider Ryuki by Tasaki, who also drew inspirations from Gamera vs. Jiger for his 2025 movie adaptation (jp) of No.1 Sentai Gozyuger.

In 2017, Shigenori Takatera (a Kadokawa Daiei chief producer, a producer of Daimajin Kanon, and a longtime acquaintance of Ryuta Tasaki) created "Gachora" (previously referred to as "Game-chan"), the Gamera-based mascot character of the city of Chōfu being designed particularly after Toto, and Gamera the Brave was screened at Gachora's debut event.

The Shima Pearl Bridge has been locally nicknamed as "The road which Gamera was the first to go down" (Japanese: ガメラが最初に通った道, Hepburn: Gamera ga Saisho ni Tōtta Michi), as the filming of Gamera the Brave was conducted prior to its open to traffic.

=== Home media ===
Gamera the Brave was released on Region 1 DVD in 2008 by Tokyo Shock. The film received a Blu-ray release in July 2016 by Kadokawa Daiei Studio, as part of a box set with 4K digital restorations of the previous films in the Gamera franchise's Heisei era.

It was also released by Arrow Video as part of their Gamera: The Complete Collection box set.
