= Godzilla: City on the Edge of Battle =

2018 film by Kōbun Shizuno

- Theatrical release poster

Japanese name
- Kanji: ゴジラ決戦機動増殖都市
Transcriptions
- Revised Hepburn: Gojira: Kessen Kidō Zōshoku Toshi
- Directed by: Kōbun Shizuno; Hiroyuki Seshita
- Screenplay by: Sadayuki Murai; Tetsuya Yamada; Gen Urobuchi
- Story by: Gen Urobuchi (Note: Sadayuki Murai served as the series composer alongside Urobuchi.)
- Produced by: Takashi Yoshizawa
- Starring: Mamoru Miyano; Takahiro Sakurai; Tomokazu Sugita; Yuki Kaji; Junichi Suwabe
- Music by: Takayuki Hattori
- Production companies: Polygon Pictures; Toho Animation
- Distributed by: Toho (Japan); Netflix (Worldwide)
- Release date: May 18, 2018 (Japan)
- Running time: 100 minutes
- Country: Japan
- Language: Japanese
- Box office: ¥172 million

Godzilla: City on the Edge of Battle (ゴジラ決戦機動増殖都市, Gojira Kessen Kidō Zōshoku Toshi; lit. 'Godzilla: Decisive Battle Mobile Proliferating City') (Note: also known as Godzilla Part 2: City on the Edge of Battle) is a 2018 Japanese computer-animated kaiju film directed by Kōbun Shizuno and Hiroyuki Seshita. Produced by Toho Animation and Polygon Pictures, in association with Netflix, it is the 33rd film in the Godzilla franchise, the 31st Godzilla film produced by Toho, the second entry in the franchise's anime trilogy, and the third film in the franchise's Reiwa period. (Note: Japan's Reiwa era began on May 1, 2019, however, Toho considers Shin Godzilla and the anime trilogy as part of the Reiwa era.)

A sequel to the 2017 film Godzilla: Planet of the Monsters, the film continues the story of humans fighting to reclaim the Earth from Godzilla, this time with the help of a weapon known as Mechagodzilla. Godzilla: City on the Edge of Battle was released theatrically in Japan on May 18, 2018, and was released worldwide on Netflix on July 18, 2018. A sequel, Godzilla: The Planet Eater, was released in Japan on November 9, 2018.

== Plot ==
Following the events of Godzilla: Planet of the Monsters, the Aratrum is unable to contact Haruo and the rest after their encounter with the original Godzilla. Unberto Mori orders the Aratrum's withdrawal if drones fail to find survivors within 48 hours. Haruo Sakaki is revealed to have been rescued by a native girl named Miana, who treated his wound with a strange powder. Haruo reunites with his teammates Yuko, Belu-Be, Adam and Marco, and they were confronted by who they later learned to be Miana's twin sister Maina before being captured by the latter's hunting party. The group are reunited with Martin Lazzari, whose platoon have been healed by the twins' people (known as the "Houtua"), surviving descendants of humans who remained on Earth and safeguard the egg of their fallen deity.

The group are telepathically questioned by the twins and the Houtua leaders over why they burned their lands, letting them go once Haruo explains they were only attacking Godzilla. Accompanied by Miana and Maina as their protective guides and observers - the twins revealing they can also speak verbally - Haruo's group reunites with Metphies and the other survivors during an encounter with the Servum. During the fight, Galu-Gu realizes that the twins' arrowheads are laced with "nanometal", the nanotechnology used to create Mechagodzilla. Galu-Gu explains that the nanometal somehow survived and expanded itself over the past 20 millennia. Haruo is convinced by Galu-Gu to remain on Earth and resume the plan to kill Godzilla, sending a few crew members back to the Aratrum. The group trace the energy signature to the rebuilt facility that held Mechagodzilla, which Galu-Gu christens "Mechagodzilla City". The twins part ways with the group while warning Haruo that the nanometal is poisonous. the Bilusaludo assure the group that the technology is only harmful to Godzilla.

The team soon finds that the surviving half of Mechagodzilla's head is the source of the nanometal. Galu-Gu accesses Mechagodzilla's brain to construct all necessary materials to trap Godzilla within the city and cover him with nanometal to finish him off with EMP harpoons, overloading him with energy and causing him to explode just like Godzilla Filius did with the EMP Probes. While overseeing the construction (her power-suit modified into one of three Vulture exo-armors), Yuko confesses her feelings for Haruo and kisses him. Feeling slightly ill since entering the city like some of the others, Haruo finds Metphies working in a cave to repair an item with some of Galu-Gu's technology. Metphies cryptically hints that the Bilusaludo's motives are to become monsters themselves due to their obsession with logic and technology, confiding to Haruo the name of a greater being more terrifying than Godzilla that destroyed his homeworld of Exifcalus:"Ghidorah".

As Godzilla awakens and begins heading towards Mechagodzilla City, most of the human members are horrified to learn that most of the Bilusaludo had willingly allowed themselves to be assimilated into Mechagodzilla City to further fortify it. Godzilla's quick advance on the city forces Galu-Gu to sacrifice the city's defenses in order to divert power to finish the harpoon while Haruo, Yuko and Belu-be would be using the three Vultures to slow Godzilla down. Though the trio managed to hold Godzilla for the plan to go underway, Godzilla survives the trap and proceeds to overheat the facility. This forces a defiant Galu-Gu to fuse with the nanometal as the humans escape the city. Galu-Gu then has the Vultures' nanometal absorb their pilots to use them as sacrificial spears to kill Godzilla.

Haruo is unaffected while Yuko is being slowly converted against her will. Metphies warns a conflicted Haruo that Mechagodzilla City will consume Earth if not stopped, and that its destruction could save Yuko, with Galu-Gu arguing that transcending their humanity is the only way to kill Godzilla. Haruo ultimately decides to fight Godzilla with his humanity intact, the destruction of Galu-Gu and the command center rendering the nanometal inert as Godzilla frees himself and destroys the city. Haruo tends to Yuko, who is unable to wake from her comatose state due to the nanometal assimilating her, while the surviving humans hide in a cave with Metphies as everything burns around them.

== Voice cast ==
Characters	Japanese	English
Haruo Sakaki (ハルオ・サカキ)	Mamoru Miyano	Chris Niosi
Metphies (メトフィエス, Metofiesu)	Takahiro Sakurai	Lucien Dodge
Yuko Tani (ユウコ・タニ, Yūko Tani)	Kana Hanazawa	Cristina Vee
Martin Lazzari (マーティン・ラッザリ, Mātin Razzari)	Tomokazu Sugita	Edward Bosco
Adam Bindewald (アダム・ビンデバルト, Adamu Bindebarudo)	Yuki Kaji	Robbie Daymond
Mulu Elu Galu Gu (ムルエル・ガルグ, Murueru Garugu)	Junichi Suwabe	Jamieson Price
Maina (マイナ)	Reina Ueda	Kendall Gimbi
Miana (ミアナ)	Ari Ozawa	Rachelle Heger
Rilu-Elu Belu-be (リルエル・ベルベ, Rilueru Berube)	Kenta Miyake	Rich Brown
Unberto Mori (ウンベルト・モーリ, Unberuto Mōri)	Kenyu Horiuchi	Keith Silverstein
Halu-Elu Dolu-do (ハルエル・ドルド, Harueru Dorudo)	Kazuya Nakai	Doug Stone
Endurphe (エンダルフ, Endarufu)	Kazuhiro Yamaji	Joe Ochman

== Production ==
The second installment in the anime trilogy was announced in a second post-credits scene in the theatrical release of the film revealing the film's Japanese title, poster featuring Mechagodzilla and the film's 2018 release date. The film's Japanese title was revealed as Gojira: Kessen Kidō Zōshoku Toshi (translations varied from Godzilla: Battle Mobile Breeding City to Godzilla: The City Mechanized for the Final Battle), while the English title was later revealed as Godzilla: City on the Edge of Battle. In March 2018, the film's official website revealed a new poster, plot details, and that singer XAI would return to perform the film's theme song The Sky Falls. The English dub was produced by Post Haste Digital.

=== Music ===
Takayuki Hattori returned to compose the soundtrack, marking it his fourth Godzilla film score. XAI also returned to perform the film's theme song The Sky Falls. On his work on the film, Hattori stated:

"18 years after Godzilla 2000, I am glad to be back in the world of the new Godzilla which was opened by Shin Godzilla. This is the first animated film in the history of Godzilla, and I am excited to be able to take on the challenge while at the same time I feel it is a very big mission. I think this will be a Godzilla movie that you can't possibly imagine. I expressed in music my own feelings about the characters and the overwhelming presence of Godzilla created by the two directors, Mr. Shizuno and Mr. Seshita." - Takayuki Hattori, Toho Press Notes

== Release ==
=== Theatrical and streaming ===
Godzilla: City on the Edge of Battle was given a theatrical release in Japan on May 18, 2018, and released worldwide on Netflix on July 18, 2018.

== Reception ==
=== Box office ===
Godzilla: City on the Edge of Battle was released in 158 theaters in Japan and reached eighth place at the box office. The film earned ¥100 million on its first week, from 73,000 ticket sales. The film went on to gross ¥171,859,000 in Japan.

=== Critical response ===
Naoya Fujita from IGN gave the film a 4.5 rating, indicating a "bad" rating, stating, "Godzilla: City on the Edge of Battle takes some promising ingredients, but cooks them into an unpalatable meal. We never really understand what the protagonists are fighting for, and there's not even a satisfying scene of urban destruction (a Godzilla staple). It fails both emotionally and viscerally." James Grebey from Inverse called the film "bleakly pointless", stating the film is "extremely self-serious, depressing and fairly light on fun" and called the film "the biggest bummer in Godzilla's filmography." James Perkins from HeyUGuys gave the film 3 stars out of 5, stating the film is "neither the best or worst iteration of the Godzilla franchise but is most definitely made with the intention of trying something new but adding a heavy sci-fi and futuristic element to the famous monster."

Jeff Pawlak from Geekiverse awarded the film 5.5 out of 10, feeling that the film had "great ideas" with an "interesting setting" but felt the CG animation was "ugly as ever", felt the film lacked complex characters and action, stating "City on the Edge of Battle completely mishandles the pass from Planet of the Monsters, failing to adequately explore the worthwhile worldbuilding it introduces, or that its predecessor introduced." Callum May from Anime News Network gave the film an overall A− rating, praising Haruo for growing as a character but criticized the lack of development for the other characters. May also criticized the second act for dragging by having the characters simply wander in the city. May concluded by stating, "While it doesn't fix many of the issues from the first film, Haruo's development manages to sell a more character-driven narrative and makes his relationships more empathetic. It's perhaps not the film that fans were expecting, but it's the film this trilogy needed to lead into an epic conclusion in Godzilla: The Planet Eater."

Mitch Nissen from ComiConverse gave the film 3 stars out of 5, criticizing the slow pace but praising the film for improving on Part 1 by expanding its ideas. Nissen also noted how the anime films do not feel like anime or kaiju films but rather, legitimate sci-fi reinventions, stating, "they are pure science fiction. Fans of in-depth cerebral science fiction should find much to enjoy about the films. References to Godzilla lore abound, much visible only to the hyper analytical Godzilla fan." Taylor Bauldwin from Geeks of Color called the film "disappointing". He criticized the slow pace, the lack of compelling motivations for the characters, and the climax battle for not carrying any weight. He concluded by stating, "I did enjoy the style and sounds of the movie but that alone is not nearly enough for redemption here. This movie begins, things happen, and then the movie ends exactly the same way it started."

=== Accolades ===
Award	Category	Recipient(s)	Result	Ref.
VFX-JAPAN Awards	Excellence Award for Theatrical Animation	Godzilla: City on the Edge of Battle	Won	

== Sequel ==
The third and final film in the anime trilogy, titled Godzilla: The Planet Eater was released on November 9, 2018.
