= Godzilla: The Planet Eater =

2018 film by Kōbun Shizuno

- Theatrical release poster

Japanese name
- Kanji: ゴジラ星を喰う者
Transcriptions
- Revised Hepburn: Gojira: Hoshi o Kū-mono
- Directed by: Kōbun Shizuno; Hiroyuki Seshita
- Screenplay by: Gen Urobuchi
- Story by: Gen Urobuchi (Note: Sadayuki Murai served as the series composer alongside Urobuchi.)
- Produced by: Takashi Yoshizawa
- Starring: Mamoru Miyano; Takahiro Sakurai; Tomokazu Sugita; Yuki Kaji
- Music by: Takayuki Hattori
- Production companies: Polygon Pictures; Toho Animation
- Distributed by: Toho Visual Entertainment(Japan); Netflix (Worldwide)
- Release dates: November 3, 2018 (Tokyo); November 9, 2018 (Japan)
- Running time: 91 minutes
- Country: Japan
- Language: Japanese
- Box office: $1.5 million

Godzilla: The Planet Eater (ゴジラ星を喰う者, Gojira Hoshi o Kū-mono) (Note: also known as Godzilla Part 3: The Planet Eater) is a 2018 Japanese animated kaiju film directed by Kōbun Shizuno and Hiroyuki Seshita. Produced and animated by Toho Animation and Polygon Pictures, in association with Netflix, it is the 34th film in the Godzilla franchise, the 32nd Godzilla film produced by Toho, the final film in the franchise's anime trilogy, and the fourth film in the franchise's Reiwa era. (Note: Japan's Reiwa era began on May 1, 2019, however, Toho considers Shin Godzilla and the anime trilogy as part of the Reiwa era.)

Godzilla: The Planet Eater concludes the narrative of the anime trilogy, taking place after the events of Godzilla: Planet of the Monsters and Godzilla: City on the Edge of Battle. The film follows humanity and their extraterrestrial allies, as they rely on Godzilla in order to defeat the planet destroyer, King Ghidorah. Godzilla: The Planet Eater was released theatrically in Japan on November 9, 2018, and was released worldwide on Netflix on January 9, 2019.

== Plot ==
Following the destruction of Mechagodzilla City, (Note: as depicted in Godzilla: City on the Edge of Battle (2018)) the remaining Bilusaludo on board the Aratrum demand justice for Haruo destroying what they saw as necessary to defeat Godzilla. The humans disagree, believing Haruo exposed the Bilusaludo's true intentions of assimilating Earth. The Bilusaludo revolt and shut down the ship's engine room, forcing the ship to run on secondary batteries for the next two days. On Earth, Dr. Martin tells Haruo that Yuko is rendered brain-dead, with the nanometal in her body keeping her alive. Those treated by the Houtua survived the nanometal's attempt to absorb them, with Methphies deceiving the survivors into believing their survival was divine intervention. Methphies plans to bring the Exifs' god to Earth and needs Haruo's help to make it possible. Dr. Martin advises Haruo to hide until tensions ease.

Haruo is escorted to a remote camp by the Houtua twins, Maina and Miana. Miana explains privately to Haruo that her people have no concept of hatred and that their concept of life revolves around "winning" (surviving and making life) or "losing" (dying and disappearing). She says that Haruo is "losing" and offers to "connect life" with him, but he turns her down. When Maina later extends the same offer, he realizes that it was she who had rescued him, not her sister Miana, and accepts. Miana discovers Metphies telepathically communicating with Endurph. The Exif reveals his plans before capturing her, as she telepathically contacts Haruo and Maina.

Metphies later conducts a ritual with his followers in conjunction with Endurph on the Aratrum to summon their god, Ghidorah, to defeat Godzilla. Ghidorah manifests as a shadow on Earth and partially through singularities, devouring Metphies's followers and destroying the Aratrum in orbit before descending to earth. Ghidorah then proceeds to attack Godzilla, who is helpless against the intangible monster. Its heads bite Godzilla and drain his energy. Dr. Martin concludes that Ghidorah's true form exists in another plane of existence and is being guided by someone in their universe, Haruo finding it to be Metphies, who had replaced his right eye with the amulet he repaired with the nanometal. Metphies's people devoted themselves to Ghidorah since learning that the universe is finite and fated to destruction, having offered thousands of planets throughout the Orion Arm for the monster to feed on. Proceeding to telepathically assault Haruo, Metphies explains that the human's hatred towards Godzilla made him an ideal offering and says that Haruo must submit himself to Ghidorah as its witness to enable its full manifestation.

Maina and Dr. Martin use the Houtuan god's egg to psychically reach Haruo and reveal how to stop Ghidorah, Haruo learning that Metphies orchestrated the deaths of the attempted colonization of the Exoplanet Tau Ceti e exploration party so they could be "saved". At the same time, Haruo recalls the charm he lost the day he fled from Earth as a boy. Its image of flowers reminds him of the meaning of his name, "Spring", and the power of hope to overcome despair. Haruo breaks free and cracks Metphies' amulet, causing Ghidorah to become affected by Earth's physics, and as such being ultimately defeated by Godzilla. Metphies dies saying that Ghidorah will always be watching Haruo as long as he lives.

Following Ghidorah's banishment from this dimension the survivors bury their weapons and integrate into Houtua society. Maina becomes pregnant with Haruo's child. Dr. Martin gets the last remaining Vulture mech working, having discovered how to use Mechagodzilla's nanometal in Yuko's body as a tool to rebuild civilization as it was. Haruo's right eye stings, hearing Metphies's voice saying that this turn of events would ensure Ghidorah's eventual return to their reality and that the cycle of destruction will threaten to begin anew. Taking Yuko with him, Haruo provokes Godzilla into destroying him and all traces of the living nanometal for the good of the Houtua. This prevents Ghidorah from returning as the Houtua continue to live alongside Godzilla; treating the kaiju like a natural disaster to be respected and avoided but not warred with.

Years later, Maina, showing signs of advancing age, watches a group of children conduct a ritual honoring Haruo, placing knotted strings representing their fears into a fire under a wooden effigy of a Vulture mech. Even in death, Haruo's story is used as a cautionary tale for future generations.

== Voice cast ==
Characters	Japanese	English
Haruo Sakaki (ハルオ・サカキ)	Mamoru Miyano	Chris Niosi
Metphies (メトフィエス, Metofiesu)	Takahiro Sakurai	Lucien Dodge
Yuko Tani (ユウコ・タニ, Yūko Tani)	Kana Hanazawa	Cristina Vee
Martin Lazzari (マーティン・ラッザリ, Mātin Razzari)	Tomokazu Sugita	Edward Bosco
Adam Bindewald (アダム・ビンデバルト, Adamu Bindebarudo)	Yuki Kaji	Robbie Daymond
Maina (マイナ)	Reina Ueda	Kendall Gimbi
Miana (ミアナ)	Ari Ozawa	Rachelle Heger
Eliott Leland (エリオット・リーランド, Eriotto Rīrando)	Daisuke Ono	Danny Boston
Unberto Mori (ウンベルト・モーリ, Unberuto Mōri)	Kenyu Horiuchi	Keith Silverstein
Halu-Elu Dolu-do (ハルエル・ドルド, Harueru Dorudo)	Kazuya Nakai	Doug Stone
Munaku (ムナク)	Kazuhiro Yamaji	
Endurphe (エンダルフ, Endarufu)	Kazuhiro Yamaji	Joe Ochman
Haruka Sakaki (ハルカ・サカキ)	Saori Hayami	Laura Post
Akira Sakaki (アキラ・サカキ)	Kenichi Suzumura	Danny Boston
Josh Emerson (ジョシュ・エマーソン, Josshu Emāson)	Haruki Ishiya	Bill Rogers
Marco Gione (マルコ・ジオーネ, Maruko Jiōne)	Junichi Yanagita	
Takeshi J. Hamamoto (タケシ・J・ハマモト)	Kanehiro Yamamoto	Paul St. Peter
Daichi Tani (ダイチ・タニ)	Tomisaburō Horikoshi	Paul St. Peter
Mulu Elu Galu Gu (ムルエル・ガルグ, Murueru Garugu)	Junichi Suwabe	Taylor Henry
Rilu-Elu Belu-be (リルエル・ベルベ, Rilueru Berube)	Kenta Miyake	Rich Brown

== Production ==
The English dubbed version was produced by Post Haste Digital.

=== Music ===
Takayuki Hattori returned to compose the soundtrack, marking it his fifth Godzilla film score. XAI also returned to perform the film's theme song Live and Die.

=== Marketing ===
In May 2018, a teaser poster revealed the film's title, release date, and potential appearance of King Ghidorah. In July 2018, the film's first teaser trailer was released. In September 2018, the film's theatrical poster was released. In October 2018, the full trailer was released.

== Release ==
=== Theatrical and streaming ===
Godzilla: The Planet Eater premiered as the closing film at the Tokyo International Film Festival on November 3, 2018, and was given a theatrical release in Japan on November 9, 2018. Released in 158 Japanese theaters, the film opened at sixth place at the box office and grossed ¥100 million in its first three days, finishing with a cume of $1.5 million. The film was released worldwide on Netflix on January 9, 2019.

=== Critical response ===
The film received mixed reviews upon its release. Joshua Meyer from /Film stated "Rather than revert to a big dumb monster movie, The Planet Eater is able to balance its kaiju action with life-and-death concerns while wrapping up threads of character drama woven through the trilogy as a whole. The movie plays with rich themes that might leave you thinking (or scratching your head) as you wait for the post-credits scene." Naoya Fujita from IGN gave the film a rating of 8.0. Fujita felt that getting through Part 1 and Part 2 was a "chore" but felt that Part 3 gave a "strong, more emotional payoff", stating, "While it took awhile to get there, the animated Godzilla trilogy ends with a fascinating chapter that – while unexpected – is worthy of the franchise." Patrick Galvan from Syfy Wire called the film the "best of the three movies", praising the film's expansion on its ideas rather than abandoning them like the previous two films but felt that it still didn't redeem the trilogy, stating the film "has a few things going for it that its two predecessors lacked, but it nonetheless fails – just as they did – to rise above the wall of mediocrity which has rendered this three-film saga the single dullest stretch in the history of the Godzilla franchise to date."

Daniel Kurland from Den of Geek awarded the film 3 stars out of 5, feeling the animation was "lackluster" with "Regrettable" CG effects and Hattori's score was "questionable." He felt the battle between Godzilla and Ghidorah was "drab" and could have been choreographed better but praised the film's themes and concluded by stating, "Godzilla can clearly hold his own within the world of anime." Richard Eisenbeis from Anime News Network awarded the film an overall B-rating, praising the anime's version of Ghidorah is "an incredible take on an iconic character" but criticized the battle between Godzilla and Ghidorah, calling it "the most boring part of the film". He also praised the film's themes of nihilism, hope, and harmony with nature but also calling them "polarizing", stating, "It's a rather extreme message, but this is far from the first pro-environmental Godzilla film. If nothing else, you will be left mulling it over as the credits roll, which is probably exactly what the filmmakers intended."

Kai Hellberg from The Daily Free Press criticized the English dub, calling it "embellished" and particularly criticized the melodramatic delivery of Haruo. He also felt the music was "out of place" and concluded by stating, "was not an outright failure. There are certainly captivating scenes and gorgeous animation. But its primary fault is trying to be babied by the legacy of Godzilla, while under the guise of being a modern take on the franchise." Anthony Wendel from Popaxiom stated that the film "doesn't save the film series. Instead it finds a way to make everything worse and leave a completely bitter taste after the movie comes to an end." He felt Metphies role as the "mouthpiece of Ghidorah" dragged on and felt the battle between Godzilla and Ghidorah was "dull". He concluded by stating the film "wastes any potential for saving the series and is an incredibly disappointing film overall. The sensation of watching this film is reminiscent of watching the disappointment from the Godzilla film Sony made in 1998."
