= Hiroyuki Seshita =

Japanese film director (born 1967)

- 寛之瀬下
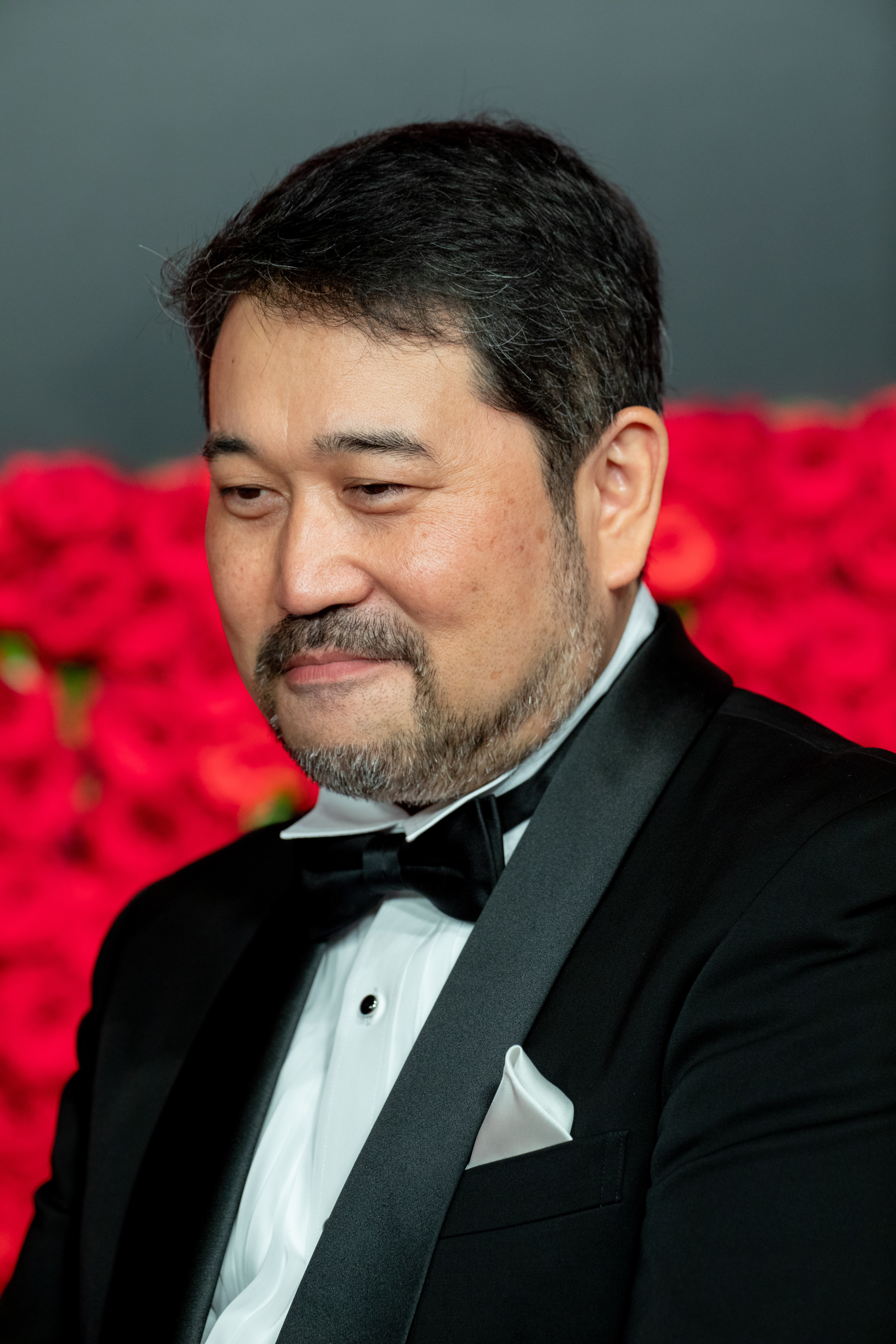
- Seshita at the Tokyo International Film Festival in 2018
- Born: February 9, 1967 (age 59); Tokyo, Japan
- Citizenship: Japan
- Occupations: Film director; Screenwriter
- Years active: 1989-present
- Organization: Polygon Pictures

Hiroyuki Seshita (Japanese: 寛之瀬下; born February 9, 1967) is a Japanese film director and screenwriter. He is notable in co-directing Godzilla: Planet of the Monsters (2017), Godzilla: City on the Edge of Battle (2018) and Godzilla: The Planet Eater (2018) with Kobun Shizuno within the Godzilla franchise.

== Career ==
Seshita joined Silver Link in 1989, and left in 1997, to move to the United States. There, he joined Square USA. In 2000, he went back to Japan and joined Square Enix under the role of special effects director. In 2010, he joined Polygon Pictures, where he served as director. He had previously participated in Rex: A Dinosaur's Story (1993), the last film by the Kadokawa Pictures with influences on the direction of Gamera the Brave (2006).

He began working with Kobun Shizuno and co-directed Godzilla: Planet of the Monsters (2017), Godzilla: The Planet Eater (2018) and Godzilla: City on the Edge of Battle (2018). Seshita wrote and directed the television series Gamera Rebirth (2023).
