= Rex: A Dinosaur's Story =

1993 Japanese film

- Theatrical release poster

Japanese name
- Kanji: REX 恐竜物語
Transcriptions
- Revised Hepburn: REX: Kyōryū monogatari
- Directed by: Haruki Kadokawa
- Screenplay by: Shoichi Maruyama; Haruki Kadokawa
- Story by: Masanori Hata
- Based on: REX by: Masanori Hata; Clamp
- Produced by: Haruki Kadokawa; Kazuyoshi Okuyama
- Starring: Yumi Adachi; Shinobu Otake; Tsunehiko Watase
- Cinematography: Masahiko Iimura
- Edited by: Shizuo Arakawa; Keiichi Itagaki
- Music by: Tomoyuki Asakawa; Kome Kome Club
- Production company: REX Production Committee
- Distributed by: Shochiku
- Release date: 3 July 1993 (Japan)
- Running time: 106 minutes
- Country: Japan
- Language: Japanese
- Budget: ¥2 billion
- Box office: ¥2.2 billion

Rex: A Dinosaur's Story (Japanese: REX 恐竜物語, Hepburn: REX: Kyōryū monogatari) is a 1993 Japanese film directed by Haruki Kadokawa, based on a manga written by Masanori Hata and illustrated by Clamp. The film stars Yumi Adachi as Chie, a young girl who befriends a young Tyrannosaurus rex after it hatches from an egg co-discovered by her paleontologist father (Tsunehiko Watase).

The film grossed ¥2.2 billion on an estimated ¥2 billion budget, and a total outlay of ¥2.45 billion once the marketing costs of ¥450 million were factored in. Nonetheless, Rex was a box-office failure, despite being the second-highest-grossing Japanese film of 1993, seventh-highest-grossing film in Japan of 1993 and Shochiku's highest-grossing release at the time (it was surpassed by Peter Jackson's The Lord of the Rings: The Fellowship of the Ring in 2002). Commentators have suggested that the film aimed to capitalize on the success of Jurassic Park, which debuted a month prior. At the 17th Japan Academy Film Prize in 1994, Adachi won the Newcomer of the Year award for her performance.

== Plot ==
In Tokachi, Hokkaido, a young girl named Chie longs to see her mother, embryologist Naomi Ito, who moved to New York after divorcing Chie's paleontologist father, Akira. Akira and his assistant Daisuke are analyzing findings from a cave, including a figurine of a child riding a Tyrannosaurus rex that dates back to the Jōmon period—long after dinosaurs went extinct—pieces of fossilized and non-fossilized egg, and some writing. They determine that the language of the writing originated from the lost continent of Mu.

The next day, Chie, Akira, Daisuke, and TV cameraman Fukutomi set out to the cave in hopes of finding a living dinosaur. They meet Shinoda, an elderly Ainu man. He prays to the god of the cave before guiding them inside, where they find an idol of a golden dinosaur. Deeper inside the cave, they discover a dinosaur egg inside a translucent square pyramid, in front of a column topped with a crystal skull. When Akira and Daisuke pick up the egg, the cave begins to collapse. Shinoda gives Chie an ocarina, and stays behind to calm the god while the others flee.

Back at Akira's home laboratory, Fukutomi informs Akira that he has invited Akira's ex-wife, Naomi, to help hatch the egg. When Naomi arrives, she shows little enthusiasm at being reunited with Chie, and Akira chastises her for abandoning Chie in favor of her career. Naomi transfers the nucleus of the dinosaur egg into a sea turtle egg, but the egg's vitals become critical. However, Chie plays the ocarina for the egg, causing its vitals to stabilize and for the infant T. rex within to hatch.

The young T. rex, whom Chie names "Rex", becomes a national sensation when he appears on TV. Chie teaches Rex to eat, understand certain words, and use a toilet. Through Daisuke, Rex is signed to appear in numerous TV commercials. However, he is overworked to the point of stress, so Chie, Naomi, and Akira break his contractual obligation. Time passes, and Rex grows larger. On Christmas Eve, Akira is told that he must hand the dinosaur over to the director of a soon-to-be-built dinosaur museum, where Rex will become a showcase. Chie and Rex run away from home, hoping to find Rex's biological mother.

That evening, amidst holiday festivities, Chie and Rex are pursued through town by the museum director and his associates. By day, with the help of a boy from Chie's school, Chie and Rex evade the museum director and his men on snowmobiles, before escaping in a hot air balloon. Chie and Rex find shelter in an igloo, and Shinoda arrives with Naomi and Akira, who have been searching for them. Chie and Naomi embrace, and the group return to the cave, where they find the remains of a Mu temple. In the distance, they see the Brocken spectre of Rex's mother. Chie and Rex bid each other goodbye, and Rex walks off to be reunited with his parent.

In a post-credits scene, Naomi has apparently returned to New York, once again leaving Chie with Akira and Chie's grandmother, Sanae. However, Naomi surprises Chie, Akira and Sanae by returning to stay with them for good. With Fukutomi alongside them, the family looks up and sees a Rex-shaped cloud in the sky.

== Cast ==
- Yumi Adachi as Chie
- Shinobu Otake as Naomi Ito
- Tsunehiko Watase as Akira Tateno
- Yuta Yamazaki as Kenta Aikawa
- Mitsuko Kusabue as Sanae Ito
- Mitsuru Hirata as Daisuke Morioka
- Masatō Ibu as Yoshiyuki Fukutomi
- Fujio Tsuneta as Senjiro Shinoda

== Production ==
=== Planning and script ===
Initially, Haruki Kadokawa planned to produce Rex: A Dinosaur's Story as a Hollywood film. However, his first (and only) Hollywood project, Ruby Cairo starring Andie MacDowell, failed to find a distributor in the United States, causing the production of Rex to be put on hold. After the filming of Jurassic Park began on August 24, 1992, Kadokawa, unwilling for his project to be seen as a knock-off, decided to produce Rex as a family film for the Japanese market, in collaboration with Shochiku and Kazuyoshi Okuyama, with whom he had collaborated since Fall Guy (1982). The running time (set at approximately 1 hour and 45 minutes) was structured to satisfy both 10-year-old children and their parents. Accordingly, Kadokawa and screenwriter Shoichi Maruyama devised a three-act script: 35 minutes until the dinosaur eggs hatch, 35 minutes until the dinosaur grows up and runs away with the heroine, and 35 minutes until the ending. For adult viewers, Rex features a structure that intertwines two storylines centralized around the film's heroine: one depicting the conflict between mother and daughter, exploring whether a mother who once abandoned her daughter can regain their bond, and another depicting the daughter becoming a mother to dinosaurs.

The year 1993, when the film was released, saw a dinosaur boom in both Japan and the United States, including many films featuring dinosaurs such as Rex.

=== Art ===
The film's dinosaur effects were provided by Italian effects artist Carlo Rambaldi.

== Soundtrack ==
The soundtrack of Rex: A Dinosaur's Story was co-composed by Tomoyuki Asakawa and Kome Kome Club. It consists of 12 tracks, including the main theme song "Toki no Tabiji: Rex no Theme", as well as the insert songs "Good Night", which was performed by Kome Kome Club, and "REX: Kyōryū monogatari", performed by Adachi. Tracks 1 through 3, and tracks 5 through 11 were arranged by Asakawa, while track 4 was arranged by Takahiro "Flash" Kaneko and track 12 was arranged by Matarou Misawa. The soundtrack was released by Sony Music Entertainment Japan (SMEJ) through Sony Records on July 1, 1993, exclusively on CD formats. The film's soundtrack omitted the Adachi version of "Good Night", which played in the main theatrical trailer but was unused in the film itself. The Adachi version of "Good Night" was arranged by Akira Senju, who also composed the soundtracks of Mama Is Just a Fourth Grade Pupil, Mobile Suit Victory Gundam, the international release version of The Mystery of Rampo, Summer Snow and Strawberry on the Shortcake.

The Rex soundtrack was the final music collaboration between SMEJ and Kadokawa Shoten Publishing, until the release of the Kadokawa Shoten co-produced film Ringu 0: Birthday (released in Japan on January 22, 2000, and distributed by Toho).

All music is composed by Tomoyuki Asakawa unless otherwise noted:

| No. | Title | Lyrics | Music | Vocals | Length |
|---|---|---|---|---|---|
| 1. | "Main Title: The Earth Loves You" | | | Rex Choir |
| 2. | "Song of the Fields" |
| 3. | "The Egg" |
| 4. | "Good Night" | Kome Kome Club | Kome Kome Club | Kome Kome Club |
| 5. | "A Cheerful Scene" |
| 6. | "The Cave" |
| 7. | "REX: Kyōryū monogatari" | Reiko Yukawa | | Yumi Adachi |
| 8. | "Bad Men" |
| 9. | "Sad Scene" |
| 10. | "Run & Chase" |
| 11. | "The Earth Loves You (Lullaby Version)" |
| 12. | "Toki no Tabiji: Rex no Theme" | Kome Kome Club | Kome Kome Club | Kome Kome Club |

== Release ==
=== Box office ===
Due to high demand, the theatrical run of Rex was planned to be extended from 10 weeks to 14 weeks, but it was cut short after the original 10-week theatrical run due to the scandal involving the director of the film. Rex grossed ¥2.2 billion in its theatrical run, making it the second-highest-grossing Japanese film of 1993, seventh-highest-grossing film in Japan of 1993 and Shochiku's highest-grossing release until it was surpassed by The Fellowship of the Ring in 2002. Had the film's theatrical run not been cut short, it is estimated that Rex would have grossed approximately ¥3 billion, higher than the ¥2.5 billion gross of both Aladdin and Home Alone 2: Lost in New York.

In October 2026, distributor Kani Releasing announced that Rex would be given a theatrical release in the United States in December of that year.

== See also ==
- Ainu mythology
- Gamera the Brave
