= MapleStory 2 =

2015 video game

- Logo of MapleStory 2
- Developer: NSquare
- Publisher: Nexon
- Engine: Gamebryo
- Platform: Windows
- Release: KOR: July 7, 2015; CHN: September 21, 2017; WW: October 10, 2018
- Genre: MMORPG
- Mode: Multiplayer

MapleStory 2 (Korean: 메이플스토리 2; RR: Meipeul Seutori 2) was a 2015 live service massively multiplayer online role-playing game (MMORPG) developed by NSquare in association with Nexon and NCSoft. MapleStory 2 was released free-to-play first in Korea. The game took many of the features of the original game, MapleStory, and applied them to a 3D voxel-based environment. Most enemies, NPCs, and locations made a return in this sequel, although with several changes.

== Gameplay ==
A screenshot of gameplay from the now defunct global version of the game. The player character is in the centre of the screenshot, while the game chat panel is in the bottom left. To the bottom is the player's health, items and abilities, with a map and quest log to the top right.

Unlike its predecessor, MapleStory 2 featured third-person movement, and a "blocky look, similar to Minecraft" according to Polygon's Julia Lee. The game contained features commonly seen in MMORPGs, such as a leveling system and customizable weapons and armour, but also a "Battle Royale" mode, PVP arena and interior decoration minigame.

The game featured premium in-game currencies, called the Blue Meret and Red Meret, which allowed players to buy unique items for their characters and virtual homes in the global servers.

The premium currency in the Korean version of the game was simply called the Meret (메럿).

== Release ==
Two closed betas for the global version were conducted, the first from May 9 to 16 and the second on July 18. The global servers became operational on October 10, 2018, with the global launch as a premier event.

The Japanese and global services were closed permanently on May 27, 2020. An official archive page was set up by Nexon, with illustrations and concept art available for free download, but this was removed from the website after some time.

The Chinese service ended on November 2, 2022. The Korean service was shut down on May 29, 2025.
