= Shunsuke Takeuchi =

Japanese voice actor and singer

- 武内 駿輔
- Born: September 12, 1997 (age 29); Tokyo, Japan
- Other name: Jack Westwood
- Occupation: Voice actor
- Years active: 2013–present
- Agent: 81 Produce
- Spouse: Misato Kato (m. 2022)
- Musical career
- Genre: J-pop
- Instrument: Vocals
- Label: TuneCore
- Member of: Amadeus

Shunsuke Takeuchi (武内 駿輔, Takeuchi Shunsuke; born September 12, 1997) is a Japanese voice actor, singer, and music producer affiliated with 81 Produce. He won the award for Best Rookie Actor at the 10th Seiyu Awards. His roles include Producer in The Idolmaster Cinderella Girls, Alexander Yamato in King of Prism, Einar in Vinland Saga, Askin Nakk Le Vaar in Bleach, Zodyl in Gachiakuta, Juza Hyodo in A3!, Revolver in Yu-Gi-Oh! VRAINS, Zack Walker in Astra Lost in Space, and Brawler in Akudama Drive.

Takeuchi is part of the musical duo Amadeus with rapper Lotus Juice as the vocalist and music producer, performing under the stage name Jack Westwood. He is also credited under the name for his music productions.

He announced his marriage to Misato Kato on September 5, 2022.

== Filmography ==
=== Anime series ===
List of voice performances in anime series
Year	Title	Role	Notes	Ref.
2014	Pripara	Ashika, Koga-senpai, Sealion, Man		
2015	Ace of Diamond 2nd Season	Yūki Masashi		
2015	Aria the Scarlet Ammo AA	Rodrigo	ep 10	
2015	Bikini Warriors	Deathgeld	ep 7	
2015	Chaos Dragon	Man A, Revolutionary Army Soldier A	ep 1, 2	
2015	JoJo's Bizarre Adventure: Stardust Crusaders	SPW Foundation Pilot	ep 48	
2015	Magical Girl Lyrical Nanoha ViVid	Edgar		
2015	Rokka: Braves of the Six Flowers	Rowen	ep 13	
2015	Snow White with the Red Hair	Lido Ryoshu	ep 7	
2015	The Heroic Legend of Arslan	Paradalata, Soldier		
2015	The Idolmaster Cinderella Girls	Producer		
2015	Young Black Jack	Hugo		
2016	Alderamin on the Sky	Sushuraf Remeon	ep 3, 4	
2016	All Out!!	Kokuto Kirishima		
2016	Bungo Stray Dogs 2	Lovecraft		
2016	Days	Shizuka Ura		
2016	Dimension W	Guard	ep 2	
2016	Duel Masters Versus Revolution Final	Dragon Ryu		
2016	First Love Monster	Shūgo Takahashi		
2016	Gate	Kurou	ep 17	
2016	Grimgar of Fantasy and Ash	Michiki	ep 7, 11	
2016	Haikyu!! Second Season	Kyoutani Kentarou		
2016	Kuromukuro	José Carlos Takasuka		
2016	Mob Psycho 100	Kumakawa		
2016	Nanbaka	Yamato Godai		
2016	Prince of Stride: Alternative	Hōnan Academy student		
2016	Servamp	Guildenstern		
2017	Altair: A Record of Battles	Zeki	ep 24	
2017	Blend S	Itō	ep 10	
2017	Children of the Whales	Pagoni		
2017	Convenience Store Boy Friends	Makoto Sakamoto		
2017	Fate/Apocrypha	Archer of Black/Chiron		
2017	Ikémen Sengoku: Romances Across Time	Akechi Mitsuhide		
2017	Kokuhaku Jikkō Iinkai: Ren'ai Series	Teacher	ep 5	
2017	Mobile Suit Gundam: Iron-Blooded Orphans	Arianrhod fleet officer		
2017	ROBOMASTERS THE ANIMATED SERIES	Mou		
2017	Sengoku Night Blood	Kuroda Kanbee		
2017	Spiritpact	Ki Tanmoku		
2017	Star-Myu: High School Star Musical 2	Koki Nanjo		
2017	The Laughing Salesman NEW	Light Knight	ep 12	
2017	Tsukipro The Animation	Shū Izumi		
2017	Yu-Gi-Oh! VRAINS	Revolver/ Ryoken Kogami		
2018	Bakumatsu	The Emperor		
2018	Beyblade Burst Turbo	Evel Oxford		
2018	Butlers: Chitose Momotose Monogatari	Rugby player		
2018	Caligula	Shougo Satake		
2018	Dame×Prince Anime Caravan	Riot		
2018	Hakyū Hōshin Engi	Sekiseishi		
2018	Hinomaru Sumo	Sōsuke Kuze		
2018	Inazuma Eleven: Ares	Goujin Tetsunosuke		
2018	Inazuma Eleven: Orion no Kokuin	Goujin Tetsunosuke		
2018	Kiratto Pri Chan	Gambler		
2018	Pop Team Epic	Mob man, Mysterious voice D		
2018	Sirius the Jaeger	Fallon		
2018	Time Bokan 24 - The Villains' Strike Back	Frank Morris	ep 22	
2018	Working Buddies!	Zōbayashi-sempai	ep 4	
2018	Zombie Land Saga	Rapper B	ep 2	
2019	Ace of Diamond Act II	Yūki Masashi		
2019	Astra Lost in Space	Zack Walker		
2019	Bakumatsu: Crisis	The Emperor		
2019	King of Prism: Shiny Seven Stars	Alexander Yamato		
2019	Mob Psycho 100 II	Kumakawa		
2019	Stand My Heroes: Piece of Truth	Makoto Tsuzuki		
2019	Star-Myu: High School Star Musical 3	Koki Nanjo		
2019	The Rising of the Shield Hero	Market seller	ep 3	
2019	W'z	Seba		
2020	A3! Season Spring & Summer	Juuza Hyoudo	ep 12	
2020	A3! Season Autumn & Winter	Juuza Hyoudo		
2020	Akudama Drive	Brawler		
2020	Darwin's Game	Danjou		
2020	Drifting Dragons	Oken		
2020	I'm From Japan	Velvet		
2020	Toilet-bound Hanako-kun	Unun	ep 12	
2020	Woodpecker Detective's Office	Kagami	ep 8, 9	
2021	Back Arrow	Demyne science choir, Guardian, Narration		
2021	Burning Kabaddi	Shinji Date		
2021	Mazica Party	Cetuscruise		
2021	Megaton Musashi	Ryugo Hijikata		
2021	Moriarty the Patriot	Adam Whitely	ep 19, 20	
2021	My Senpai Is Annoying	Harumi Takeda		
2021	Peach Boy Riverside	Noburega		
2021	Seven Knights Revolution: Hero Successor	Joe		
2021	The Fruit of Evolution	Black Paladin	ep 11	
2021	Tokyo Revengers	Makoto Suzuki		
2021	Tsukimichi: Moonlit Fantasy	Adonow	ep 10	
2022	Aoashi	Nagisa Akutsu		
2022	Beast Tamer	Shadow Knight	ep 7	
2022	Bleach: Thousand-Year Blood War	Askin Nakk Le Vaar		
2022	Me & Roboco	Motsuo Kaneo		
2022	On Air Dekinai!	Ichimura, Sakuma P		
2022	The Prince of Tennis II: U-17 World Cup	Chris Hoppman		
2022	Tribe Nine	Tatsuto Tatsunuma		
2023	Demon Slayer: Kimetsu no Yaiba – Swordsmith Village Arc	Urogi		
2023	Firefighter Daigo: Rescuer in Orange	Teppei Igarashi		
2023	Goblin Slayer II	Mushijin Monk	ep 9	
2023	Heavenly Delusion	Shiro		
2023	High Card	Brist Blitz Broadhurst		
2023	Kaina of the Great Snow Sea	Prince of Aquoile, Valghian Dockworker		
2023	Mashle	Mandragora	ep 5	
2023	Migi & Dali	Maruta Tsutsumi		
2023	Ragna Crimson	Disas Trois		
2023	Revenger	Teppa Murakami		
2023	Summoned to Another World... Again?	Kagerou		
2023	The Tale of the Outcasts	Dantalion		
2023	Undead Girl Murder Farce	Dennis		
2023	Vinland Saga Season 2	Einar		
2024	Arnold & Puppets	Arnold Kreiburg; Puppets Joker, Leo, Bane, Tracy, Owl, Bonbon, Michiko, Kreacher &d Margaretha		
2024	Black Butler: Public School Arc	Herman Greenhill		
2024	Goodbye, Dragon Life	Dolan		
2024	How I Attended an All-Guy's Mixer	Tokiwa		
2024	I Parry Everything	Gilbert		
2024	Kaiju No. 8	Aoi Kaguragi		
2024	Metallic Rouge	Jean Yunghart		
2024	Puniru Is a Cute Slime	Gо̄-yan		
2024	Tōhai	Tōjima		
2024	Tono to Inu	Tono		
2024	Uzumaki	Boy 2		
2024	Viral Hit	Hamaken		
2025	A Wild Last Boss Appeared!	Alioth		
2025	Dekin no Mogura	Tōshirō Nekozuku		
2025	Gachiakuta	Zodyl		
2025	I Left My A-Rank Party to Help My Former Students Reach the Dungeon Depths!	Mastoma		
2025	Princession Orchestra	Doran		
2025	The Shy Hero and the Assassin Princesses	Toto		
2025	Welcome to the Outcast's Restaurant!	Dennis		
2026	Fist of the North Star	Kenshiro		
2026	High School! Kimengumi	Gō Reietsu		
2026	Nippon Sangoku	Shiryo Nagamine		
2026	Kill Blue	Juzo Ogami (adult)		
2026	Psyren	Hiryu Asaga		
2026	Sparks of Tomorrow	Kengo Kuga		
2026	Yoroi-Shinden Samurai Troopers	Yamato Hōjō		
2027	The Case Files of Biblia Bookstore	Daisuke Gōra		
TBA	Melody of the Boundary	Makoto		

=== Original video animation ===
List of voice performances in Original video animation
Year	Title	Role	Notes
2016	Ajin: Demi-Human - Nakamura Shinya Incident	Ryota	
2016	Under the Dog	Male student	
2017	First Love Monster OVA	Shūgo Takahashi	
2018	Star-Myu: High School Star Musical OVA Vol.3	Koki Nanjo	

=== Original net animation ===
List of voice performances in Original net animation
Year	Title	Role	Notes
2015	Ninja Slayer From Animation	Deadmoon	ep 25
2018	Sword Gai: The Animation	Doctor, Souin	
2018	Saint Seiya: Saintia Shō	Toki	ep 2
2019	Bakugan: Battle Planet	Dragonoid	
2019	SD Gundam World Sangoku Soketsuden	Cao Cao Wing Gundam	
2020	Bakugan: Armored Alliance	Dragonoid	
2021	Chinzei Hachirō Tametomo	Hachirō Chinzei	
2022	Bakugan: Evolutions	Dragonoid	
2022	Gudetama: An Eggcellent Adventure	Gudetama	
2022	Gaiken Shijō Shugi	Basco	
2022	Lupin Zero	Daisuke Jigen	
2023	Cute Executive Officer R	Enemy Batter, Man-Eating Chicken	
2023	Gamera Rebirth	Prudencio Fortea	
2023	Yakitori: Soldiers of Misfortune	Tyron Baxter	
2024	Garouden: The Way of the Lone Wolf	Tsutomu Himekawa	
2024	Great Pretender: Razbliuto	Jiang Jinshu	
2024	Rising Impact	Riser Hopkins	
2025	Record of Ragnarok III	Sakata Kintoki	
2026	Yu-Gi-Oh! Card Game The Chronicles	Endymion	

=== Anime films ===
List of voice performances in anime films
Year	Title	Role	Notes
2015-18	Digimon Adventure tri.	Hackmon/Jesmon	
2015	Little Witch Academia: The Enchanted Parade	Resident	
2016	King of Prism by Pretty Rhythm	Alexander Yamato	
2016	PriPara Minna no Akogare Let's Go PriPari	Wolf	
2017	Blame!	Villager	
2017	King of Prism: Pride the Hero	Alexander Yamato	
2018	Monster Strike The Movie: Sora no Kanata	Hanzo	
2019	King of Prism: Shiny Seven Stars	Alexander Yamato	
2019	My Hero Academia: Heroes Rising	Chojuro Kon/ Chimera	
2020	King of Prism All Stars: Prism Show Best 10	Alexander Yamato	
2021	Mobile Suit Gundam: Hathaway's Flash	Iram Masam	
2021	Ryōma! Shinsei Gekijōban Tennis no Ōji-sama	Boo	
2022	Mobile Suit Gundam: Cucuruz Doan's Island	Cucuruz Doan	
2022	The First Slam Dunk	Eiji Sawakita	
2023	Spy × Family Code: White	Type F	
2025	The Rose of Versailles	Alain de Soissons	
2026	Mobile Suit Gundam: Hathaway – The Sorcery of Nymph Circe	Iram Masam	
2026	Made in Abyss: Mezameru Shinpi	Yataramar	

=== Video games ===
2015

- The Idolmaster as Producer
- Granblue Fantasy as Barawa

2016

- The Caligula Effect as Shougo Satake
- La Corda d'Oro as Sunaga Takumi
- Elsword as Ain
- MapleStory as Shade
- Under Night In-Birth Exe:Late[st] as Enkidu

2017

- Danganronpa V3: Killing Harmony as Gonta Gokuhara
- Musou Stars as Oda Nobunyaga
- Super Bomberman R as Black Bomber
- Sengoku Night Blood as Kanbee Kuroda
- Xenoblade Chronicles 2 as Wulfric (Jikarao)
- Aka to Blue as Aka Sheenk
- A3! as Juza Hyodo

2018

- Fate/Grand Order as Chiron
- Shinen Resist as Trueno

2019

- Kingdom Hearts III as Olaf (replacing Pierre Taki)
- Arknights as Rangers and Matterhorn

2020

- The King of Fighters for Girls as Goro Daimon
- Bleach: Brave Souls as Askin Nakk Le Vaar
- Genshin Impact as Dvalin/Stormterror
- Alchemy Stars as Barton

2021

- Re:Zero − Starting Life in Another World: The Prophecy of the Throne as Salum
- Ensemble Stars! as Gatekeeper
- Rune Factory 5 as Murakumo
- NEO: The World Ends with You as Hishima Sazakuchi
- Cookie Run: Kingdom as Purple Yam Cookie
- The Legend of Heroes: Trails Through Daybreak as Sherid Asverl
- Gate of Nightmares as Ziguile
- The Legend of Heroes: Trails Through Daybreak II, Sherid Asverl

2022

- even if TEMPEST as Zenn Sorfield

2023

- Street Fighter 6 as Jamie
- even if TEMPEST Dawning Connections as Zenn Sorfield
- Honkai: Star Rail as Dr. Ratio

2026

- Arknights: Endfield as Antal
- Kyoto Xanadu as Masayuki Rikudo
- Dark Auction as Otto Klein
- Resident Evil Requiem as Zeno
- Fatal Fury: City of the Wolves as Kenshiro

=== Tokusatsu ===
2021

- Mashin Sentai Kiramager vs. Ryusoulger as Evil voice
- Ultra Galaxy Fight: The Absolute Conspiracy as Zoffy

2022

- Ultra Galaxy Fight: The Destined Crossroad as Zoffy

=== Multimedia projects ===
2023

- PolaPoriPosuPo as Kyosuke Ebina
- Fragaria Memories as Badobarm

2024

- VS AMBIVALENZ as Riam/Luvnosuke

== Dubbing ==
=== Live-action ===
- The Acolyte as Yord Fandar (Charlie Barnett)
- Barbie as Ken (Ryan Gosling)
- Coming 2 America as Lavelle Junson (Jermaine Fowler)
- Danger Close: The Battle of Long Tan as Private Paul Large (Daniel Webber)
- Decision to Leave as Soo-wan (Ko Kyung-pyo)
- The Dog Stars as Hig (Jacob Elordi)
- Dolittle as Humphrey (Tim Treloar)
- Dungeons & Dragons: Honor Among Thieves as Edgin the Bard (Chris Pine)
- Escape Room: Tournament of Champions as Theo (Carlito Olivero)
- Everything Everywhere All at Once as Chad (Harry Shum Jr.)
- Final Cut as Mounir (Lyes Salem)
- Gladiator II as Lucius "Hanno" Verus (Paul Mescal)
- Guardians of the Galaxy Vol. 3 as Adam Warlock (Will Poulter)
- Happiest Season as John (Dan Levy)
- Jaws 2 (2022 BS Tokyo edition) as Michael Brody (Mark Gruner)
- Judas and the Black Messiah as William O'Neal (Lakeith Stanfield)
- Major Grom: Plague Doctor as Sergei Razumovsky / Plague Doctor (Sergei Goroshko)
- The Matrix Resurrections as Berg (Brian J. Smith)
- Meg 2: The Trench as Lance (Felix Mayr)
- The Night Of as Nasir "Naz" Khan (Riz Ahmed)
- The Odyssey as a bard (Travis Scott)
- Rebel Moon as Tarak (Staz Nair)
- The Running Man as Ben Richards (Glen Powell)
- Saltburn as Felix Catton (Jacob Elordi)
- St. Elmo's Fire (2022 The Cinema edition) as William Hicks (Rob Lowe)
- The Suicide Squad as Richard "Dick" Hertz / Blackguard (Pete Davidson)
- Superman as Superman (David Corenswet)
- Teenage Mutant Ninja Turtles: Out of the Shadows as Trevor (Connor Fox)
- Tomb Raider as Bruce (Josef Altin)
- Top Gun: Maverick as Robert "Bob" Floyd (Lewis Pullman)
- Transformers: Rise of the Beasts as Wheeljack (Cristo Fernández)
- Uncharted as Samuel "Sam" Drake (Rudy Pankow)
- Wonka as Ficklegruber (Mathew Baynton)

=== Animation ===
- Barney's World as Barney
- DC League of Super-Pets as Cyborg
- Encanto as Mariano Guzman
- Frozen (revised dub) as Olaf (replaced Pierre Taki after his March 2019 arrest)
- Frozen 2 as Olaf
- Inside Out 2 as Bloofy
- Lookism as Lee Eun Tae/Vasco
- RWBY as Vine Zeki
- Scott Pilgrim Takes Off as Kyle and Ken Katayanagi
- Thomas & Friends: All Engines Go as Gordon
- Transformers: EarthSpark as Thrash Malto
- Trolls Band Together as Cloud Guy

== Discography ==
=== Songwriting credits ===
Year	Album	Artist	Song	Lyrics		Music	
Year	Album	Artist	Song	Credited	With	Credited	With
2018	Non-album single	Amadeus	"O.M.C."	No	—N/a	Yes	—N/a
2018	Non-album single	Amadeus	"You Make Me"	No	—N/a	Yes	—N/a
2019	Non-album single	Amadeus	"Cold Rain"	No	—N/a	Yes	—N/a
2020	Non-album single	Amadeus	"Phantom Smoke"	No	—N/a	Yes	—N/a
2020	Non-album single	Amadeus	"Cream Soda"	No	—N/a	Yes	—N/a
2020	Non-album single	Amadeus	"Reason"	No	—N/a	Yes	—N/a
2021	Non-album single	Amadeus	"Cold Rain 2021"	No	—N/a	Yes	—N/a
2021	Non-album single	Kumi Sasaki (Hinatazaka46)	"Night Flight"	No	—N/a	Yes	—N/a
2021	Non-album single	Amadeus	"More & More"	No	—N/a	Yes	—N/a

== Accolades ==
Year	Award	Result
2016	10th Seiyu Awards for Best Rookie Actors	Won
2021	Monomane Grand-Prix	Won
