= Animation director =

Animator in charge of correcting layouts and drawings

An animation director is the director in charge of all aspects of the animation process during the production of an animated or television film, or an animated segment for a live-action film or television show. Alternatively, the animation director can be the animator in charge of correcting layouts and drawings for the above media. The difference between the two is largely in the difference between the Western and Eastern animation industries. The differences between the two models are similar to the differences in art directors.

== Responsibilities ==
In Western animation, such as Disney, the responsibilities of an animation director include directing the storyboards, character designs, background animation, and other technical aspects of a project's animation. Some animated film productions may split the duties between an animation director, who focuses on the creation of the animation, and a director who oversees all other aspects of the film. A supervising animator is commonly in charge of all aspects of the design and artwork for a single major character. The supervising animator oversees a group of animators who complete the entire scenes in which a particular character appears. The day-to-day responsibilities of an animation director may include checking and updating lists for each scene. These lists will track the status of each shot with written notes and approvals from the Director.

=== Eastern media ===
In the Eastern production pipeline, most notably in the anime and Chinese animation industries, the role of an "animation director" is significantly different from its Western counterpart in the animation production pipeline. Rather than overseeing all of a project's animation, an animation director (作画監督, Sakuga Kantoku), known as a sakkan (作監) for short, acts more as a sort of 'drawing director' who corrects key animation drawings and layouts. These corrections can range from the sakkan correcting parts of the animation that are off-model or not up-to-par, to changing some of the drawings into their style, or simply maintaining a level of quality while allowing for free expression from the key animators. Above an animation director in Japanese productions is the chief animation director (総作画監督, sō sakuga kantoku), shortened to sou sakkan (総作監), whose job is to maintain a level of uniformity across an entire series. Although these roles are meant to be encompassed by a small number of animators maintaining high-quality work, the state of the Japanese animation industry has shifted the roles, with sou sakkan appearing in multiples across singular episodes at times, which is largely due to the lack of animators and lack of time or bad scheduling which vastly limit the possibility of only a few sou sakkan appearing across an entire work. These terms and pipeline system originated in Japan, but the Chinese animation industry has a similar production system with similar roles, such as the chief animation director (总作画监督) and animation director (作画监督).

Besides the sakkan role, there is also the animation director (アニメーションディレクター) role, although it denotes various jobs. In some instances, such as Yoshikazu Yasuhiko's role on Mobile Suit Gundam, the role refers to Yasuhiko performing what is a sou sakkan job with a few added responsibilities like drawing layouts himself (rather than just correcting them). Early works by studio Bones utilized the "animation director" role in a similar capacity according to director Hiroyuki Kitakubo. Another way the credit is used is as a sort of pseudo-director, such as Keizou Shimizu's role on Legend of the Galactic Heroes seasons 3 and 4, in which he described his role on the series as him acting as both a drawing director who supervised layouts and animation, as well as performing traditional directing duties such as checking storyboards and correcting them. One other way the credit is used is much closer to the Western production pipeline's understanding of the role, in which the animation director acts more like a technical director; for example, Reiji Nagazono has been credited as such on several of the works by Polygon Pictures, in which studio representative director Shuuzou John Shiota described as being the person who helps to define and supervise the entirety of the animation process in a project.
