= +Ultra =

Japanese anime programming block

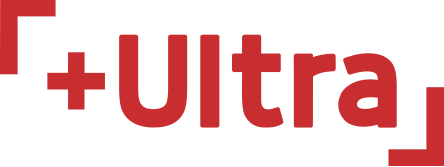
- Logo
- Network: Fuji TV
- Launched: October 18, 2018; 8 years ago
- Country of origin: Japan
- Format: Anime
- Running time: Thursdays 0:45–1:15 JST
- Original language: Japanese
- Official website: Official website

+Ultra (プラス・ウルトラ, Purasu Urutora; pronounced Plus Ultra) is a Japanese late-night anime programming block produced on Fuji Television under the FNS affiliation, and airs on Wednesday nights from 24:45 to 25:15 JST (effectively Thursday mornings from 12:45 to 1:15 a.m.).

== History ==
On March 8, 2018, the programming block was announced. According to Fuji TV producer Mori Akitoshi, the block is "kind of a brother" to the already established noitaminA block airing on the same network, due to it being a unique vision of an anime block, much like itself. Akitoshi further mentions that the block was made due to the diversification of viewing media, with anime being shared around the world via streaming services, which is why the block is based on the concept of spreading anime culture overseas with high-quality animation for the world.

Ingress: The Animation became the first program to air on the timeslot.

=== Crunchyroll Co-productions ===
On September 23, 2021, Crunchyroll, Slow Curve, and Fuji TV announced the partnership to co-produce new anime projects, which launched in April 2022. The titles will air exclusively on the programming block, and on Crunchyroll worldwide outside of Asia. Among the projects announced were Polygon Pictures's produced shows of Gorō Taniguchi's Estab-Life, as well as Tsutomu Nihei's Kaina of the Great Snow Sea, with the Crunchyroll and Fuji TV co-produced Muv-Luv Alternative announced ahead of the partnership.

== Titles ==
No.	Title	Time Slot	Start date	End date	Eps.	Studio	Notes
1	Ingress: The Animation	0:55	October 18, 2018	December 27, 2018	11	Craftar	Based on the mobile game by Niantic.
2	Revisions	0:55	January 10, 2019	March 28, 2019	12	Shirogumi	Original work.
3	Carole & Tuesday	0:55	April 11, 2019	October 2, 2019	24	Bones	Original work.
4	Beastars	0:55	October 10, 2019	December 26, 2019	12	Orange	Based on the manga series by Paru Itagaki.
5	Drifting Dragons	0:55	January 9, 2020	March 26, 2020	12	Polygon Pictures	Based on the manga series written by Taku Kuwabara.
6	BNA: Brand New Animal	0:55	April 8, 2020	June 24, 2020	12	Studio Trigger	Original work.
7	Great Pretender	0:55	July 8, 2020	December 16, 2020	23	Wit Studio	Original work.
8	Beastars (Season 2)	0:55	January 7, 2021	March 25, 2021	12	Orange	Sequel to Beastars.
9	Cestvs: The Roman Fighter	0:55	April 15, 2021	June 24, 2021	11	Bandai Namco Pictures; Logic&Magic	Based on the manga series by Shizuya Wazarai.
10	Night Head 2041	0:55	July 15, 2021	September 30, 2021	12	Shirogumi	Based on the TV drama series created by George Iida.
11	Muv-Luv Alternative	0:55	October 7, 2021; July 6, 2022 (Rerun)	December 23, 2021; September 21, 2022 (Rerun)	12	Yumeta Company; Graphinica	Based on the visual novel by âge. Co-production with Crunchyroll.
12	The Heike Story	0:55	January 13, 2022	March 17, 2022	11	Science Saru	Based on the novel series by Hideo Furukawa.
13	Estab Life: Great Escape	0:55	April 7, 2022; April 13, 2023 (Rerun)	June 23, 2022; June 29, 2023 (Rerun)	12	Polygon Pictures	Part of a multimedia project by Gorō Taniguchi. Co-production with Crunchyroll.
14	Muv-Luv Alternative (Season 2)	0:55	October 6, 2022	December 22, 2022	12	Yumeta Company; Graphinica	Sequel to Muv-Luv Alternative.
15	Kaina of the Great Snow Sea	0:55	January 12, 2023	March 23, 2023	11	Polygon Pictures	Original work by Tsutomu Nihei. Co-production with Crunchyroll.
16	Undead Girl Murder Farce	0:55	July 6, 2023	September 28, 2023	13	Lapin Track	Based on the novel series by Yugo Aosaki. Co-production with Crunchyroll.
17	KamiErabi God.app	0:55	October 5, 2023; July 4, 2024 (Rerun)	December 21, 2023; September 19, 2024 (Rerun)	12	Unend	Original work by Yoko Taro. Co-production with Crunchyroll.
18	Metallic Rouge	0:55	January 11, 2024	April 4, 2024	13	Bones	Original work by Yutaka Izubuchi.
19	Viral Hit	0:55	April 11, 2024	June 27, 2024	12	Okuruto Noboru	Based on the manhwa series by Taejun Pak. Co-production with Crunchyroll.
20	KamiErabi God.app (Season 2)	0:55	October 3, 2024	December 19, 2024	12	Unend	Sequel to KamiErabi God.app.
21	Honey Lemon Soda	0:55	January 9, 2025	March 27, 2025	12	J.C.Staff	Based on the manga series by Mayu Murata. Co-production with Crunchyroll.
22	The Beginning After the End	0:45	April 2, 2025; January 8, 2026 (rerun)	June 18, 2025; March 26, 2026 (rerun)	12	Studio A-Cat	Based on the web novel series by Brandon Lee a.k.a TurtleMe. Co-production with Crunchyroll.
23	Onmyo Kaiten Re:Birth Verse	0:45	July 3, 2025	September 18, 2025	12	David Production	Original work by Fujiko Sakuno, Hideya Takahashi, and Akutō Satō.
24	Let's Play	0:45	October 2, 2025	December 18, 2025	12	OLM	Based on the web comic series by Leeanne M. Krecic a.k.a Mongie.
25	The Beginning After the End (Season 2)	0:45	April 1, 2026	June 24, 2026	12	Studio A-Cat	Sequel to The Beginning After the End.
26	Thunder 3	0:45	July 9, 2026	October 1, 2026	12	Unend	Based on the manga series by Yuki Ikeda.
27	A Returner's Magic Should Be Special (Season 2) (Note: Season 1 aired on Tokyo MX and other networks from October to December 2023.)	0:45	October 8, 2026	TBA	TBA	Arvo Animation	Based on the web novel series by Usonan. Sequel to A Returner's Magic Should Be Special.
28	SSS-Class Revival Hunter	0:45	January 2027	TBA	TBA	Studio Fu	Based on the web novel series by Sinnoa.

== Films ==
No.	Title	Release date	Studio	Notes
1	Kaina of the Great Snow Sea: Star Sage	October 13, 2023	Polygon Pictures	Sequel to Kaina of the Great Snow Sea.
2	Bloody Escape: Jigoku no Tōsō Geki	January 5, 2024	Polygon Pictures	Related to Estab Life.

== See also ==
- Late-night anime programming blocks in Japan
- Other anime programming blocks by FNS
  - Blue Lynx, Fuji TV's yaoi (boys' love) anime label
  - noitaminA, airing on Friday evenings
