= Great Pretender (TV series) =

Japanese original net animation (ONA) series

- Anime key visual Clockwise from top left: Makoto, Laurent, Abigail, and Cynthia
- Genre: Comedy; Heist
- Created by: Wit Studio
- Anime television series
- Directed by: Hiro Kaburagi; Assistant director: Ryōji Masuyama
- Produced by: Song Jingzhou; Masaya Saitō; Noriko Ozaki
- Written by: Ryōta Kosawa
- Music by: Yutaka Yamada
- Studio: Wit Studio
- Licensed by: Netflix
- Original network: Fuji TV (+Ultra)
- Original run: June 2 – September 21, 2020 (Note: The series was originally released through Netflix in four batches from June to September 2020. The series also received a Japanese television broadcast on Fuji TV's +Ultra block from July 9 to December 17, 2020.)
- Episodes: 23
- Manga
- Written by: Ryōta Kosawa
- Illustrated by: Daichi Marui
- Published by: Mag Garden
- English publisher: NA: Seven Seas Entertainment
- Imprint: Blade Comics
- Magazine: Mag Comi
- Original run: June 10 – August 20, 2020
- Volumes: 1
- Original net animation

Great Pretender: Razbliuto
- Directed by: Hiro Kaburagi; Assistant director: Mai Teshima
- Produced by: Youko Ueda; Kana Enomoto; Masaya Saitou
- Written by: Hiro Kaburagi; Taku Kishimoto (Note: Scenario supervision by Ryōta Kosawa.)
- Music by: Yutaka Yamada
- Studio: Wit Studio
- Licensed by: Crunchyroll
- Released: February 23 – March 15, 2024
- Episodes: 4
- icon

Great Pretender (stylized in all caps) is a Japanese anime television series produced by Wit Studio, directed by Hiro Kaburagi and written by Ryōta Kosawa. The series' arcs are called "cases", and the first case (Los Angeles Connection) was released in June 2020 on Netflix in Japan. The series' first three cases (Los Angeles Connection, Singapore Sky, and Snow of London) were released worldwide on Netflix in August 2020, followed by its fourth case (Wizard of Far East) in November. The series also aired from July to December 2020 on Fuji TV's +Ultra anime programming block. A sequel, Great Pretender: Razbliuto, premiered in February 2024.

== Plot ==
Makoto Edamura is a small-time Japanese con artist who claims to be Japan's greatest swindler. After attempting to scam a seemingly naive French tourist in Asakusa with his partner Kudo, Makoto discovers that he has been outplayed and targeted by the police. The tourist is revealed to be Laurent Thierry, a far more skilled and internationally connected con man, who draws Makoto into the world of high-stakes fraud. Fleeing Japan, Makoto follows Laurent to Los Angeles, where he becomes entangled in elaborate confidence schemes targeting powerful criminal figures, including major mafia bosses. As Makoto is drawn deeper into Laurent's operations, his assortment of associates, and a network of international con schemes, he realizes he got more than he bargained for as each operation pushes the limits of his abilities.

== Characters ==
=== Team Confidence ===
Makoto Edamura (枝村 真人, Edamura Makoto)
Voiced by: Chiaki Kobayashi (Japanese); Alan Lee, Griffin Faulkner (child) (English)
The protagonist, a small-time Japanese con man who aspires to greater things. Hoping to find a good job to pay his ill mother's medical bills, he starts working for a company that he is unaware is engaging in fraud, and is arrested and imprisoned for his involvement. Unable to find honest work after being paroled because of his arrest and the stigma from his father's criminal past, he decides to become a con artist instead. He ends up becoming Laurent's partner after an unsuccessful attempt to con him. He is nicknamed "Edamame" by Laurent, who has difficulty remembering his name. He has a fascination with gashapon and buys them at various points in the series. He has a thick, peculiar accent when speaking English, occasionally remarked upon by others.
Laurent Thierry (ローラン・ティエリー, Rōran Tierī)
Voiced by: Junichi Suwabe (Japanese); Aaron Phillips (English)
An expert French con man, renowned for his persuasiveness and quick wit. He grew up in Brussels with his mother Emma Thierry, and he learned several different languages as a child as he aspired to become a diplomat, being functional in at least French, English, Japanese and Mandarin Chinese. An investor named Hugo took advantage of Emma's dyslexia, tricking her out of her life savings. One night, Laurent tried to kill Hugo, but ended up stabbing a woman named Dorothy instead whom he later fell in love with. He operates as a gentleman thief, only targeting rich, corrupt people who are a negative influence to society. He uses the scams to expose his targets for their misdeeds, while helping those who were victimized by their targets live honest and happy lives. While ruthless toward his victims, he treats his comrades and associates like a family. He has a flirtatious nature and is a reputed playboy.
Abigail Jones (アビゲイル・ジョーンズ, Abigeiru Jōnzu)
Voiced by: Natsumi Fujiwara (Japanese); Kausar Mohammed (English)
An athletic, taciturn woman who is Laurent's second-in-command. Her great physical abilities come in part from her childhood ballet training. Her life changed when Baghdad was bombed, killing her parents and she became a child soldier. She carries a dented medal that she won in a ballet competition as a memento of her parents.
Cynthia Moore (シンシア・ムーア, Shinshia Mūa)
Voiced by: Mie Sonozaki (Japanese); Laura Post (English)
One of Laurent's associates who uses her feminine charms and acting skills to manipulate their targets. Her abilities came from her training to become a stage actress as a young adult.
Kudo (工藤, Kudō)
Voiced by: Yōhei Tadano (Japanese); Mike Pollock (English)
A Japanese con-man and Edamame's boss for his first job. After being caught by the police, he joins Laurent's gang.
Kim Si Won (キム・シウォン, Kimu Shiwon)
Voiced by: Kujira (Japanese); Karen Huie (English)
A Korean con-woman and one of Laurent's associates.
Seiji Ozaki (尾崎 誠司, Ozaki Seiji)
Voiced by: Shunsuke Sakuya (Japanese); Kirk Thornton (English)
Edamame's father. He worked as a lawyer, while secretly working with Laurent's gang. He was arrested for aiding a human trafficking network and that led to Edamame being unable to get a regular job.
Dorothy (ドロシー, Doroshī)
Voiced by: Yuka Komatsu (Japanese); Laura Stahl (English)
Laurent's ex-lover and the leader of the original confidence gang. She was shot on a yacht and fell overboard after a failed confidence game. In the twenty-third episode, it is revealed that she is still alive in Taiwan with her memories lost, adopting the name "Li Siang-siang".

=== Los Angeles ===
Eddie Cassano (エディ・カッサーノ, Edi Kassāno)
Voiced by: Atsushi Ono (Japanese); Fred Tatasciore (English)
A Hollywood film director who secretly sells drugs.
Salazar (サラザール, Sarazāru)
Voiced by: Ryōta Takeuchi (Japanese); Alain Mesa (English)
A bodyguard working for Cassano; his wife died many years before the series events. He has a son named Tom who lives in foster care.
Inspector Anderson (アンダーソン警部, Andāson Keibu)
Voiced by: Atsuki Tani (Japanese); Jamieson Price (English)
An LAPD detective who has been chasing after Cassano for years. He is corrupt and frequently lets Cassano get away in exchange for bribes. He has a daughter who attends college and studying overseas.

=== Singapore ===
Sam Ibrahim (サム・イブラヒム, Samu Iburahimu)
Voiced by: Fuminori Komatsu (Japanese); Abe Martell (English)
An exiled Arab oil tycoon and the organizer of the Pathfinder Air Race.
Clark Ibrahim (クラーク・イブラヒム, Kurāku Iburahimu)
Voiced by: Chikahiro Kobayashi (Japanese); Ariyan Kassam (English)
An ace pilot and Sam's younger brother.
Lewis Mueller (ルイス・ミューラー, Ruisu Myūrā)
Voiced by: Kenji Nomura (Japanese); Neil Kaplan (English)
An aerial stunt pilot and former pilot in the United States Military. He was permanently disabled in a previous race with Clark that ended in his plane crashing.
Isabelle Mueller (イザベル・ミューラー, Izaberu Myūrā)
Voiced by: Mayumi Sako (Japanese); Lipica Shah (English)
Lewis's wife.

=== London ===
James Coleman (ジェームス・コールマン, Jēmusu Kōruman)
Voiced by: Yoshito Yasuhara (Japanese); Trevor Devall (English)
An English art appraiser. He pretends to love Farrah, but is only using her for her money so he can buy expensive works of art.
Thomas Meyer (トーマス・メイヤー, Tōmasu Meiyā)
Voiced by: Daisuke Hirakawa (Japanese); Eric Tiede (English)
Cynthia's ex-boyfriend, a painter who previously worked for Coleman creating "lost" art works that Coleman would then verify and sell.
Farrah Brown (ファラ・ブラウン, Fara Buraun)
Voiced by: Takako Honda (Japanese); Julie Nathanson (English)
A wealthy older woman in love with Coleman.
Tim (ティム, Timu)
Voiced by: Shougo Nakamura (Japanese); Rich Orlow (English)
Farrah's butler.

=== Tokyo ===
Akemi Suzaku (朱雀 アケミ, Suzaku Akemi)
Voiced by: Gara Takashima (Japanese); Sachiyo K. (English)
CEO of Suzaku Association, a corporation that manages trading companies in Tokyo and Shanghai. The corporation is also involved in human trafficking.
Ishigami (石神)
Voiced by: Tomokazu Seki (Japanese); James Taku Leung (English)
Edamame's boss at the Suzaku Association.
Igarashi (五十嵐)
Voiced by: Shinya Kote
A character from the live-action series The Confidence Man JP by the same scriptwriter.

=== Shanghai ===
Liu Xiao (劉暁, Liú Xiao)
Voiced by: Shūhei Sakaguchi (Japanese); Vic Chao (English)
The boss of the mafia Shanghai Longhu-bang that makes their money through human trafficking.
Chen Yao (陳尭, Chen Yáo)
Voiced by: Tsuguo Mogami
Liu's right-hand man.

=== Taipei ===
Chiang Pin Chueh (Jay) (江 品爵（ジェイ）, Jiang Pinjue (Jei))
Voiced by: Shunsuke Takeuchi
The young head of Wang's syndicate based in Taipei. He is the adopted son of the syndicate's leader Wang. He is a playboy who likes women and has a habit of cheating on them. He has a close working relationship with Ayi. He develops a romantic interest with Dorothy, but they break up.
Yang Kun I (Ayi) (楊 崑義（アイ）, Yáng Kūnyì (Ai))
Voiced by: Yasuhiro Mamiya
A con artist working under Jay. He self-proclaims himself as Taipei's best genius grifter, but his attempt to scam Dorothy fails. He works for Jay wanting as somebody who desires money.
Lin (林, Lín)
Voiced by: Kazuyuki Okitsu
A member of Wang's syndicate and Jay's younger brother. He acts in cunning ways as he will do anything to get promoted within the syndicate.
Wang Yiqi (王 翊碁, Wáng Yìqí)
Voiced by: Yasuyuki Kase
The head of a syndicate specializing in drug trafficking that rules Taipei's dark society. He is a cold-hearted man who is keeping a watchful eye on his adopted son Jay, and vows to get revenge on Dorothy after being scammed by her gang before getting amnesia.
Tsai (蔡, Cài)
Voiced by: Mitsuaki Kanuka
An executive of Wang's syndicate. He nicknamed the Drug Sommelier as he is an expert in dealing drugs.
Bingyan (ビンイェン, Bin'i~en)
Voiced by: Mariya Ise
Secretary of Wang's syndicate. She is a quiet employee who is an expert at maintaining her poker face to hide her real objective.

=== Other characters ===
Miki Edamura (枝村 美紀, Edamura Miki)
Voiced by: Ayumi Tsunematsu (Japanese); Veronica Taylor (English)
Edamame's late mother. She encouraged Edamame to keep his morale up since her husband's arrest.
Emma Thierry (エマ・ティエリー, Ema Tierī)
Voiced by: Aya Endo (Japanese); Claire Dodin (English)
Laurent's late mother. She was dyslexic and died after becoming a scam victim, which eventually led to Laurent becoming a con artist.

== Media ==
=== Anime ===
During Anime Expo 2019, Wit Studio revealed announced the 23-episode original anime television series, directed by Hiro Kaburagi, written by Ryōta Kosawa, character designs by Yoshiyuki Sadamoto and music composed by Yutaka Yamada. Yamada also composed its theme song "G.P.", while its ending theme is a cover of the song "The Great Pretender" performed by Queen lead vocalist Freddie Mercury, originally recorded by The Platters.

The series' story is divided into blocks of episodes called "Cases". Case 1: Los Angeles Connection is episodes 1 through 5, Case 2: Singapore Sky is episodes 6 through 10, Case 3: Snow of London is episodes 11 through 14, and Case 4: Wizard of Far East is episodes 15 through 23. Case 1 began streaming on Netflix Japan on June 2, 2020, with Case 2 following on June 9. Case 3 began streaming on Netflix Japan on June 16, 2020, and Case 4 followed on September 21.

The anime series aired on Fuji TV's +Ultra anime programming block and BS Fuji from July 8 to December 16, 2020.

Great Pretender's first 14 episodes were released outside of Japan on Netflix on August 20, 2020, with the last 9 following on November 25.

A sequel original net animation (ONA), titled Great Pretender: Razbliuto, (Note: "Razbliuto" is a long-running hoax of a Russian word, that purportedly cannot be translated into the English language. In reality this word does not exist in the Russian language.) was released in four episodes (as Intermission 1: Taipei Rendezvous), from February 23 to March 15, 2024, on DMM TV, following its North America cinema screenings on January 9 and 10. Crunchyroll licensed the sequel and released it in full on February 23, 2024.

=== Manga ===
A manga adaptation by Daichi Marui began releasing on Mag Garden's Mag Comi and LINE Manga from June 10, 2020. The manga series has been licensed in North America by Seven Seas Entertainment. The series went on hiatus on September 10, 2020, due to Marui's poor health.

No.	Original release date	Original ISBN	English release date	English ISBN
1	July 10, 2020	978-4-80000-993-7	July 6, 2021	978-1-64827-583-8
