= Estab Life =

Japanese media franchise

- Project visual

エスタブライフ (Esutabu Raifu)
- Created by: Gorō Taniguchi
- Anime television series

Estab Life: Great Escape
- Directed by: Hiroyuki Hashimoto
- Produced by: Akitoshi Mori; Shota Komatsu; Hiroto Yonemori
- Written by: Shoji Gatoh
- Music by: Yoshiaki Fujisawa
- Studio: Polygon Pictures
- Licensed by: Crunchyroll
- Original network: Fuji TV (+Ultra)
- Original run: April 7, 2022 – June 23, 2022
- Episodes: 12
- Anime film

Bloody Escape: Jigoku no Tōsō Geki
- Directed by: Gorō Taniguchi
- Written by: Gorō Taniguchi; Shingo Nagai
- Music by: Kōtarō Nakagawa
- Studio: Polygon Pictures
- Licensed by: Crunchyroll
- Released: January 5, 2024
- Runtime: 96 minutes
- icon

Estab Life (エスタブライフ, Esutabu Raifu) is a Japanese mixed-media project created by Gorō Taniguchi. An anime television series by Polygon Pictures titled Estab Life: Great Escape aired from April to June 2022 on Fuji TV's +Ultra programming block. An anime film also by Polygon Pictures titled Bloody Escape: Jigoku no Tōsō Geki premiered in January 2024. A mobile game developed by Square Enix titled Estab Life: Unity Memories has also been announced, however it was cancelled after the release of the film.

== Plot ==
The franchise takes place in the distant future, when the world population has turned to decline. The H.D.E.D. (Human Diversity Experimental Department) is conducted by the ecosystem management AI for the purpose of species prosperity, in addition to ordinary humans, beasts, and various races such as demons and cyborgs. In addition, AI has created many areas surrounded by high walls called "clusters", and the culture, common sense, and values of each area have been formed. Tonkyork Metropolis (a portmanteau of New York City and Tokyo located in the Kantō region) and Chicagosaka (a portmanteau of Chicago and Osaka located in the Kansai region) during the work have become experimental and futuristic cities divided by clusters, and AI monitoring makes it impossible for people to come and go freely.

== Characters ==
=== Estab Life: Great Escape ===
==== Escape Shop Extractors ====
Equa (エクア, Ekua)
Voiced by: Tomomi Mineuchi (Japanese); Julie Shields (English)
She is the leader of the Escape Shop Extractors, a mercenary group that helps clients escape their heavily guarded clusters. When she is not doing an escape job, she is attending school at the Ochanomizu cluster and is the manager of Cafe Vostok. She has the power of precognition called Fatal Luck that allows her to see seconds into the future, and she uses that to plan out her escape tactics.
Feles (フェレス, Feresu)
Voiced by: Rie Takahashi (Japanese); Alexis Tipton (English)
A member of the Escape Shop Extractors who is a "Gun Wizard" is able to cast spells that manipulate bullets. She is athletic and highly proficient with guns.
Martes (マルテース, Marutēsu)
Voiced by: Maria Naganawa (Japanese); Sarah Wiedenheft (English)
A humanoid slime girl who is a member of the Escape Shop Extractors. Her body is composed of several slime lifeforms. She has great affection for Equa.
Alga (アルガ, Aruga)
Voiced by: Show Hayami (Japanese); Anthony Bowling (English)
A robotic member of the Escape Shop Extractors. He is in charge of technical support for the team.
Ulula (ウルラ)
Voiced by: Shin-ichiro Miki (Japanese); Cris George (English)
A wolf beastman who is a member of the Escape Shop Extractors. He only speaks in growls and barks and specializes in close combat.

=== Estab Life: Unity Memories ===
Ashley (アッシュ, Asshu)
Voiced by: Gakuto Kajiwara
Herbert (ハーバート, Hābāto)
Voiced by: Toshiyuki Toyonaga
Charles (チャールズ, Chāruzu)
Voiced by: Hiro Shimono
Occa (オウカ, Ōka)
Voiced by: Kanon Takao
Kokuto (コクトウ, Kokutou)
Voiced by: Satsumi Matsuda
Mithril (ミスリル, Misuriru)
Voiced by: Yūki Kuwahara
Fel (フェル, Feru)
Voiced by: Minami Takahashi
Sidden (シデン, Shiden)
Voiced by: Makoto Furukawa
Hajun Shogun (波旬将軍, Hajun Shōgun)
Voiced by: Kenjiro Tsuda
Prime Minister Akimori (秋森首相, Akimori Shushō)
Voiced by: Toshiyuki Morikawa

=== Bloody Escape: Jigoku no Tōsō Geki ===
Kelvin (キサラギ, Kisaragi)
Voiced by: Yūki Ono
Loretta (ルナルゥ, Runarū)
Voiced by: Reina Ueda
Cruz (クルス, Kurusu)
Voiced by: Soma Saito
Jimmy (ジャミ, Jami)
Voiced by: Yuma Uchida
Lalac (ララック, Rarakku)
Voiced by: Satsuki Yukino
Nonoc (ノノック, Nonokku)
Voiced by: Masayo Kurata
Zanza (ザンザ)
Voiced by: Jun Fukuyama
Zesh (ゼッシュ, Zesshu)
Voiced by: Ryōtarō Okiayu
Yaohachi (ヤオハチ)
Voiced by: Kazuhiro Nakaya

== Media ==
=== Anime ===
The project by Gorō Taniguchi was originally announced on September 23, 2021, and was fully announced as a mixed-media project on January 20, 2022, with an anime television series by Polygon Pictures titled Estab Life: Great Escape (エスタブライフ グレイトエスケープ, Esutabu Raifu Gureito Esukēpu) that premiered on March 1, 2022, on the Japanese streaming service Fuji TV on Demand and aired from April 7 to June 23, 2022, on Fuji TV's +Ultra programming block, as well as an anime film directed and written by Taniguchi at Polygon Pictures originally titled Estab Life: Revengers' Road (エスタブライフ リベンジャーズロード, Esutabu Raifu Ribenjāzu Rōdo; "Estab Life the Movie: Revengers' Road"), which was originally set to premiere in 2023. The film's title was later changed to Bloody Escape: Jigoku no Tousou Geki (BLOODY ESCAPE -地獄の逃走劇-; "Bloody Escape: Escape from Hell"), with the planned release date changed to January 5, 2024. Hiroyuki Hashimoto is directing the television series, with Shoji Gatoh supervising and penning the series' scripts, Yūsuke Kozaki drafting the original character designs, Yoshiaki Fujisawa composing the series' music, and Slow Curve developing and producing the series. The opening theme song is "Rana" by Meychan, while the ending theme song is "0" by Good on the Reel. Crunchyroll streamed the series outside of Asia.

On April 11, 2022, Crunchyroll announced that the series will receive an English dub, which premiered on April 20.

==== Episodes ====
No.	Title	Directed by (Note: Information is taken from the ending credits of each episode.)	Written by	Storyboarded by	Original release date (Note: All episodes were released on Fuji TV on Demand before their air dates.) (Note: Fuji TV lists the series premiere at 24:55 on April 6, 2022, which is effectively 12:55 a.m. JST on April 7.)
1	"You Can't Run from Schoolwork"; Transliteration: "Gakugyō kara Nigerarenai" (Japanese: 学業から逃げられない)	Hiroyuki Hashimoto	Shoji Gatoh	Hiroyuki Hashimoto	April 7, 2022 (Note: Episode 1 to 4 were released on Fuji TV on Demand on March 1, 2022.) (Note: This episode aired at 12:35 a.m. JST, 20 minutes before the original air time on Fuji TV.)
A team of extractors consisting of Equa, Martes, Feles, Ulula, and Alga helps their client escape by faking her death, but the team encounters more difficulties than expected having to hack the cluster's security checkpoint with security drones in pursuit. The next day, Equa, Martes, and Feles start a typical school day in the Ochanomizu cluster and they notice that one of the teachers at their school, Ichiro Yamada, is depressed and unhappy with his job. Yamada hires the extractors to help him escape Ochanomizu to the Akihabara cluster chosen at random. The extractors infiltrate a tower and after fighting off a horde of security drones, they reach the top, and then they send Yamada to his destination using a zip line.
2	"You Can't Run from Memories"; Transliteration: "Omoide kara Nigerarenai" (Japanese: 思い出から逃げられない)	Kenta Sakama	Jinroku Myōgaya (Note: A pseudonym used by Kou Kimura)	Masaki Sugiyama	April 14, 2022
Toichi, the president of the yakuza group called the Kanto Union based in Shinjuku that Feles used to work for, requests the extractors to help him escape Shinjuku for the Sangenjaya cluster after his succession ceremony. Toichi was once saved by Feles after getting caught up in a mafia fight. Toichi explains that his delusions of becoming a magical girl are what led him to wanting to escape Shinjuku as he shows the extractors his secret collection of stereotypical magical girl outfits. Feles recalls the time she joined Equa's team as she ran away and was found by Equa who gave her a dream, and applies that mindset to help Toichi escape. That night, while fleeing the yakuza Toichi runs into his successor, who is not pleased that he is fleeing before he could learn everything from him. Feles fires a bullet that ricochets off everybody's guns to disarm them and allow the extractors to get away. The extractors get Toichi to the shrine where he is blasted out of a cannon to his destination. The next day, Feles opens up the case containing a magical girl outfit and Martes mistakes her for a real magical girl.
3	"You Can't Run from the Aquarium"; Transliteration: "Suizokukan kara Nigerarenai" (Japanese: 水族館から逃げられない)	Daisuke Shimamura	Shōji Gatō	Daisuke Shimamura	April 21, 2022
The extractors head to an aquarium on the east side of the Ikebukuro cluster to meet their next client Mikhail, the director of a penguin ballet troupe. Mikhail wants his troupe to escape to the west side as due to the communist law in the east, their performances are censored. While initially able to sneak in, Mirpen, the chief of the east side's police force and a longtime friend, exposes the extractors, and Equa lets herself get captured so that Martes and Feles can escape. Equa is interrogated and using her precognitive ability called Fatal Luck that allows her to see a few seconds into the future, she anticipated that Feles and Martes would come in to rescue her and uses her foresight to get away. With the police in pursuit, Mikhail drives his troupe towards the train tracks separating the east from the west side where there is almost always a train passing by. Equa uses Fatal Luck to find an opening on the tracks allowing everybody to escape to the west side. Sometime later, Mikhail's troupe becomes famous much to Mirpen's disgust.
4	"You Can't Run from Democracy"; Transliteration: "Minshu Shugi kara Nigerarenai" (Japanese: 民主主義から逃げられない)	Daiki Sekimizu	Shōji Gatō	Keiei Yūzumi	April 28, 2022 (Note: This episode aired at 1:05 a.m. JST, 10 minutes after the original air time on Fuji TV.)
While the extractors are on another job in the Ueno cluster, the many slime lifeforms that make up Martes hold a mental parliament session inside her mind to debate over why they love Equa, disagreeing over the reasons. The next day, Martes becomes unusually attached to Equa as half of her body was left behind in Ueno, which serves as the counterbalance to her personality. The extractors return to the Ueno cluster to collect her missing half and they rebel against her other half. Martes' two halves battle on the top of a statue before Equa intervenes to break up the fight. Equa falls off the statue, and Martes' halves put their hostilities aside to save Equa. Afterwards, the two halves reunite and reconcile with each other.
5	"You Can't Run from the Goddess"; Transliteration: "Megami kara Nigerarenai" (Japanese: 女神から逃げられない)	Kenta Sakama	Jinroku Myōgaya	Masaki Sugiyama	May 5, 2022 (Note: Episode 5 to 8 were released on Fuji TV on Demand on March 22, 2022.) (Note: This episode aired at 1:15 a.m. JST, 20 minutes after the original air time on Fuji TV.)
The extractors head to the Odaiba cluster, which has been turned into a hot springs resort, to help their next client, the priestess Vivaldi, escape. The extractors enter Odaiba not wearing underwear by the law of cluster, but Feles refuses to take hers off causing the security drones to chase after them. After eluding security, the extractors meet up with Vivaldi, who explains that her desire to wear underwear is why she wants to escape Odaiba. That night, the extractors sneak Vivaldi out and despite their best efforts, they were spotted. The extractors get on a speedboat to evade the security drones, and in the midst of the chase, the missiles hit the goddess statue that reveals that the goddess did wear underwear. The next day, a hidden message revealed on the statue that says everybody can wear underwear for an hour each day. Knowing that she can wear underwear on a limited basis that Vivaldi decides to stay in Odaiba.
6	"You Can't Run from the Leader"; Transliteration: "Rīdāgyō kara Nigerarenai" (Japanese: リーダー業から逃げられない)	Daiki Sekimizu	Shingo Nagai	Yutaka Kagawa	May 12, 2022
Equa comes down with a cold as the extractors agree to help their next client, Hachiro, escape the Akihabara cluster. The extractors take on the job without Equa while she rests. The extractors struggle with the job as Feles mishandles the contractual component by constantly changing locations before Hachiro signs the contract, causing Hachiro to get nervous. The extractors hide Hachiro in a giant box and attempt to escape the cluster, but without Equa's precognitive ability the extractors draw the attention of security drones at every checkpoint. As the extractors prepare to send Hachiro to his destination inside a cannon, security drones close in, but in deciding to brave her illness, Equa arrives to launch a grenade to disable the drones. Equa apologizes to Hachiro for the trouble her teammates put him through, and Hachiro decides to stay in Akihabara for the time being.
7	"You Can't Run from Bonds"; Transliteration: "Kizuna kara Nigerarenai" (Japanese: 絆からは逃げられない)	Hiroyuki Hashimoto	Shingo Nagai	Hiroyuki Hashimoto	May 19, 2022
With business struggling at Cafe Vostok, Equa considers giving the menu a makeover in order to draw customers. While the girls discuss their new menu, Alga finds a safe in the basement. Equa then goes off shopping and while she is away, Alga attempts to open the safe by trying all possible combinations. Not wanting Equa to find out that they have been trying to force open the safe, Feles and Martes try to stall Equa over the phone. After Alga reaches his limit, Feles manages to open the safe with the next combination, finding the deed to the cafe, a teddy bear, and a memory stick inside. The memory stick contains a video that Equa recorded when she took over as the manager of Cafe Vostok expressing her desire to keep things the same. After learning about Equa's history, the girls decide that they do not need to change anything and that the most important thing is to stay together.
8	"You Can't Run from Destiny"; Transliteration: "Unmei kara Nigerarenai" (Japanese: 運命から逃げられない)	Daisuke Shimamura	Shingo Nagai	Daisuke Shimamura	May 26, 2022
The extractors head to the Shirokane cluster to meet their next client Fernand, a butler who serves Cendrillon in her mansion. Despite having put up with Cendrillon's demanding behavior that led to her other servants fleeing, Fernand finally decides that he wants to leave in order to pursue a new career. The extractors get Fernand out of the cluster without any trouble. Shortly after Fernand escapes, the cluster termination process begins that erases everything created within the Shirokane cluster. The extractors return to the mansion to get Cendrillon out, but they learn that she is the cluster's moderator. Cendrillon ordered the termination because of the cluster's decreasing population to the point where it could not be sustained, and thus she scared away the remaining inhabitants so that she can begin the process with Fernand being the last person to leave. Cendrillon decides to have a birthday party with the extractors to celebrate her imminent rebirth in the cluster's final moments. On the morning after the party, Cendrillon thanks the extractors for being her first and final friends before disappearing upon the completion of the cluster termination process.
9	"You Can't Run from Control"; Transliteration: "Shihai kara Nigerarenai" (Japanese: 支配から逃げられない)	Daisuke Shimamura	Hayato Kazano	Daisuke Shimamura	June 2, 2022 (Note: Episode 9 to 12 were released on Fuji TV on Demand on April 12, 2022.)
For their next job, the extractors become inmates at Fuchu Prison, a maximum security prison where the prisoners, most of them either committing petty crimes or are wrongly accused, are subjected to hard labor and extended sentences under the supervision of a power-hungry warden. Equa uses Fatal Luck to win the lottery to participate in the horse race, an event where the winners are supposedly released from prison. Equa makes an aggressive bet with the warden that she will win the race. After a slow start she rushes to the lead and falls off her horse just before crossing the finish line. While the warden was focused on the race, Martes steals the master key from the warden. The extractors pass the key to each other while in pursuit by the prison's security drones with Equa riding the horse to the main entrance with the key to open the gate. In doing so, the security drones are disabled, the warden is drained of her power built up by the prisoners, and the prisoners are set free. Meanwhile, the main supercomputer running the clusters updates its system in light of this event.
10	"You Can't Run from Running Away"; Transliteration: "Nigete mo Nigete mo Nigerarenai" (Japanese: 逃げても逃げても逃げられない)	Kenta Sakama	Shingo Nagai	Masaki Sugiyama	June 9, 2022
One day at school, Equa finds out that Fatal Luck is gone. After returning to the cafe, the extractors are suddenly attacked by an army of security drones, managing to escape by going through the basement and into the sewers. Learning that they are wanted criminals with the authorities launching a massive manhunt campaign, they run towards Ōedo Station to escape the Ochanomizu cluster. With the power out, the extractors run on the tracks and are impeded by a security gate. Despite not having Fatal Luck to rely on, Equa cuts the correct wire and the extractors escape to the Akihabara cluster. With the manhunt extending well beyond Ochanomizu, the extractors rest up and plan their next move on the roof of a building in Akihabara. Equa explains that she became an extractor to help others, and that Fatal Luck was given to her three years ago by an AI entity known as the Manager, or Mr. M as she calls her, and believes that Mr. M is involved with everything. Shortly afterwards, the extractors are found and they are surrounded by security drones.
11	"You Can't Run from True Feelings"; Transliteration: "Honshin kara wa Nigerarenai" (Japanese: 本心からは逃げられない)	Daisuke Shimamura	Shoji Gatoh	Daisuke Shimamura	June 16, 2022
With the manhunt causing widespread destruction, the extractors run away to the Sangenjaya cluster to find the legendary terminal, a public phone that is currently their only means of contacting Mr. M. Searching through the information Mr. M sent the extractors, Equa recognizes the sound file as having the same pattern as the escape dance she and Mr. M created, concluding that Mr. M wants to escape. As the extractors continue to run away, Feles is shot in the arm while protecting Equa. With Feles down, the extractors are rescued by Toichi, who managed to become a magical girl after escaping Shinjuku. While the extractors rest and regroup, Equa tells everybody that she will infiltrate Ōedo Castle in the city center to help Mr. M escape. This risky decision causes Feles to walk away feeling unable to protect her with her injured arm. Martes makes a plea to Equa to convince Feles to come back, and Equa complies with her request. Equa apologizes to Feles and convinces her that she is needed for the task, and Feles rejoins the group.
12	"You Can't Run from the Extractors"; Transliteration: "Nigashi-ya kara Nigerarenai" (Japanese: 逃がし屋から逃げられない)	Kenta Sakama	Shoji Gatoh	Daisuke Shimamura	June 23, 2022
The extractors infiltrate Ōedo Castle and are immediately attacked by security drones on the elevator. With the group running low on ammunition, Alga, Ulula, and then Martes stay behind to allow Equa and Feles to reach the top of the castle. The two reach Mr. M, who is the administrator of this world. Mr. M explains that Fatal Luck is a precognitive ability based on simulations he ran, and how the current state of Tokyo came to be. Mr. M was hoping to create a perfect utopia through the cluster system, but soon realized it was only a fantasy. He hired extractors in order to get dissidents out of clusters they are struggling to fit in with. As for the escape request, Mr. M did not intend to escape, but decides to convert his core data into a bio-printed body to escape with Equa and leave behind a reformatted self. He emerges in a body with Cendrillon's appearance, who Equa names Miss M. In escaping Ōedo Castle with Miss M, Equa's Fatal Luck is restored, the extractors are resupplied with ammunition, and Miss M takes control of an army of security drones to fight back. Martes, Ulula, and Alga rejoin the group and everybody escapes the castle with a coordinated attack on the leading security robot aided by Fatal Luck at the main entrance. Six months later, the extractors return to work with Hachiro in Akihabara as their first client.

=== Game ===
A mobile game developed by Square Enix for Android and iOS titled Estab Life: Unity Memories (エスタブライフ ユニティメモリーズ, Esutabu Raifu Yuniti Memorīzu) has been announced. The game is a free-to-play MMORPG title with in-app purchases.
