= Drifting Dragons =

Japanese manga series

- First tankōbon volume cover

空挺ドラゴンズ (Kūtei Doragonzu)
- Genre: Adventure, cooking, fantasy
- Manga
- Written by: Taku Kuwabara
- Published by: Kodansha
- English publisher: NA: Kodansha USA
- Magazine: good! Afternoon
- Original run: June 7, 2016 – present
- Volumes: 23
- Original net animation
- Directed by: Tadahiro Yoshihira
- Produced by: Akitoshi Mori
- Written by: Makoto Uezu
- Music by: Masaru Yokoyama
- Studio: Polygon Pictures
- Licensed by: Netflix (streaming); NA: Sentai Filmworks (home video)
- Released: January 9, 2020 – March 26, 2020
- Episodes: 12
- icon

Drifting Dragons (Japanese: 空挺ドラゴンズ, Hepburn: Kūtei Doragonzu; lit. 'Airborne Dragons') is a Japanese manga series written and illustrated by Taku Kuwabara. It has been serialized in Kodansha's seinen manga magazine good! Afternoon since June 2016 and has been collected in twenty-three tankōbon volumes as of November 2026. The manga is published digitally in English by Kodansha USA under the Kodansha Comics imprint.

An original net animation adaptation by Polygon Pictures was released on Netflix Japan on January 9, 2020. The same day, the series' first episode premiered on Fuji TV's +Ultra programming block, and continued weekly until March 26, 2020, with the final episode's television airing. It was followed by an international Netflix release in April 2020.

== Plot ==
Set in a world where humans hunt dragons, they dwell in the skies and provide valuable food and materials for the world that hunts them. The story follows the crew of the Quin Zaza, one of the last remaining dragon-hunting airships, as they pursue dragons through the clouds to survive. Among the crew are Mika, a skilled but reckless draker with a deep passion for gourmet cooking; Takita, an inexperienced newcomer striving to prove herself; and other hunters bound together by the dangers and demands of their profession. Dragon hunting promises great rewards but carries constant risk, as each dragon is unique and deadly, and failure can mean starvation.

As the Quin Zaza travels from hunt to hunt, there are both the high-stakes aerial battles required to bring down dragons and the everyday realities of life aboard the ship, including maintenance, financial strain, and social isolation. Ostracized on the ground and facing danger in the air, the drakers rely on one another as a family.

== Characters ==
Mika (ミカ)
Voiced by: Tomoaki Maeno (Japanese); Billy Kametz (English)
Takita (タキタ)
Voiced by: Sora Amamiya (Japanese); Cassandra Lee Morris (English)
Jiraud (ジロー, Jirō)
Voiced by: Sōma Saitō (Japanese); Johnny Yong Bosch (English)
Vanabelle (ヴァナベル, Vanaberu)
Voiced by: Kana Hanazawa (Japanese); Colleen O'Shaughnessey (English)
Gibbs (ギブス, Gibusu)
Voiced by: Junichi Suwabe (Japanese); Keith Silverstein (English)
Crocco (クロッコ, Kurokko)
Voiced by: Tomokazu Seki (Japanese); Jake Green (English)
Niko (ニコ)
Voiced by: Takahiro Sakurai (Japanese); Todd Haberkorn (English)
Berko (バーコ, Bāko)
Voiced by: Kōsuke Toriumi (Japanese); Doug Erholtz (English)
Capella (カペラ, Kapera)
Voiced by: Rie Kugimiya (Japanese); Christine Marie Cabanos (English)
Gaga (ガガ)
Voiced by: Kentarō Kumagai (Japanese); Kaiji Tang (English)
Faye (フェイ, Fei)
Voiced by: Makoto Furukawa (Japanese); Tony Azzolino (English)
Badakin (バダキン)
Voiced by: Takashi Matsuyama (Japanese); Jonah Scott (English)
Oken (オーケン, Ōken)
Voiced by: Shunsuke Takeuchi (Japanese); Alejandro Saab (English)
Soraya (ソラヤ)
Voiced by: Yūto Uemura (Japanese); Bryce Papenbrook (English)
Mayne (メイン, Mein)
Voiced by: Chinatsu Akasaki (Japanese); Reba Buhr (English)
Hiro (ヒーロ, Hīro)
Voiced by: Junya Enoki (Japanese); Daman Mills (English)
Yoshi (ヨシ)
Voiced by: Kazuhiko Inoue (Japanese); Chris Smith (English)
Lee (リー, Rī)
Voiced by: Hiroo Sasaki (Japanese); Kyle McCarley (English)
Katja (カーチャ, Kācha)
Voiced by: Ayane Sakura (Japanese); Kayli Mills (English)
Nanami (ナナミ)
Voiced by: Sayaka Senbongi (Japanese); Kira Buckland (English)
Ascella (アスケラ, Asukera)
Voiced by: Maaya Sakamoto (Japanese); Cristina Vee (English)
Ura (ウラ爺, Ura-jii)
Voiced by: Kiyonobu Suzuki (Japanese); Kirk Thornton (English)

== Media ==
=== Manga ===
Drifting Dragons is written and illustrated by Taku Kuwabara. It started its publication in Kodansha's good! Afternoon on June 7, 2016. Kodansha has published the series into individual tankōbon volumes. The first volume was released on November 7, 2016. As of November 6, 2026, twenty-three volumes have been released.

In North America, Kodansha USA announced the digital release of the manga in November 2017. They also announced the print release of the manga in March 2019. The first volume was published on December 17, 2019.

==== Volume list ====
No.	Original release date	Original ISBN	English release date	English ISBN
1	November 7, 2016	978-4-06-388204-9	December 17, 2019	978-1-63236-890-4
Flight 1: Quin Zaza (クィン・ザザ, Kuin Zaza); Flight 2: Bounty & Dragonet alla Diavola (賞金と極小龍の悪魔風, Shōkin to kyokushō ryū no akuma-fū); Flight 3: Reasons for Flying & Dragon Terinne (乗船理由と龍のテリーヌ, Jōsen riyū to ryū no terīnu); Flight 4: The Shining Dragon & Smoked Salo (光る龍と塩漬脂身の燻製, Hikaru ryū to shiozuke aburami no kunsei); Flight 5: Sky Pirates & Pastrami (空中海賊とパストラマ, Kūchū kaizoku to Pasutorama)
2	May 1, 2017	978-4-06-388255-1	December 17, 2019	978-1-63236-944-4
Flight 6: First Butchering & Dragon Tapestries (はじめての解体と龍の壁掛け, Hajimete no kaitai to ryū no kabekake); Flight 7: Festival & Dragon Laghman (祭りと龍肉の手延べ汁麺, Matsuri to ryū niku no tenobe shirumen); Flight 8: Disaster & Edible Dragons (大災と食える龍, Ō wazawai to kueru ryū); Flight 9: Operation: Take Down The Rampaging Dragon (暴れ龍捕獲作戦, Abareryū hokaku sakusen); Flight 10: Soup Kitchen Goulash & Dragon Cutlet (炊き出しの釜煮と龍のカツレツ, Takidashi no kama-ni to ryū no katsuretsu); Flight 11: Farewells & Departure (別れと旅立ち, Wakare to tabidachi)
3	November 7, 2017	978-4-06-510319-7	February 18, 2020	978-1-63236-945-1
Flight 12: Jerky & Portraits (干し肉と似顔絵, Hoshiniku to nigao e); Flight 13: Migrating Dragons & the Chasm Depths (渡りの龍と谷の底, Watari no ryū to tani no soko); Flight 14: Dragonet & Dragon Brain Hunter Stew (小さい龍と龍脳の猟師鍋, Chīsai ryū to ryū nō no ryōshi nabe); Flight 15: Dragon Oil Mayonnaise & Mount Kin (龍油のマヨネーズとキン山, Ryū-yu no mayoneizu to Kin-san); Flight 16: The Migrating Dragons' Destination (渡りの龍の終着地, Watari no ryū no shūchaku chi); Flight 17: Dragon Corridor (龍の回廊, Ryū no kairō)
4	May 7, 2018	978-4-06-510319-7; 978-4-06-512047-7 (LE)	April 3, 2020	978-1-63236-951-2
Flight 18: Luxury Liner & Cafeteria Cheeseburgers (豪華船と賄いチーズバーガー, Gōka-sen to makanai chīzubāgā); Flight 19: The Oboro Casca & Brno Massinga (オボロカスカ号とブルノ・マッシンガ, Oborokasuka gō to Buruno Masshinga); Flight 20: Repair Costs & Dragon Art (修理代と龍の絵, Shūri-dai to ryū no e); Flight 21: Panna Cotta & Hunt Order (パナコッタと討伐指定状, Pana Kotta to tōbatsu shitei-jō); Flight 22: Ship Eater (船喰い, Fune kui); Flight 23: Swallowed Vannie & Ambergris Lamp (食べられたヴァニーと龍, Taberareta Vanī to ryū yodare kō no ranpu)
5	November 7, 2018	978-4-06-513454-2	August 25, 2020	978-1-63236-952-9
Flight 24: Stowaway & Ship Eater Offal Hot Pot (密航者と船喰いのモツ鍋, Mikkō-sha to fune kui no motsu nabe); Flight 25: Parting Gifts & Promise (餞別と約束, Senbetsu to yakusoku); Flight 26: Drunks & Ham-Stuffed Mushrooms (酔っ払いと生ハム詰めマッシュルーム, Yopparai to nama hamu-zume masshurūmu); Flight 27: Secret Base & the Past (秘密基地と過去, Himitsu kichi to kako); Flight 28: First Draking & Steak Tartare (はじめての龍捕りとタルタルステーキ, Hajimete no ryū tori to tarutaru suteiki); Flight 29: Kraken (クラーケン, Kurāken)
6	May 7, 2019	978-4-06-515527-1; 978-4-06-515530-1 (LE)	October 20, 2020	978-1-64651-035-1
Flight 30: Escaping the Storm (嵐からの脱出, Arashi kara no dasshutsu); Flight 31: Brawl & Kraken Carpaccio (喧嘩とクラーケンのカルパッチョ, Kenka to kurāken no karupaccho); Flight 32: What It Takes to Drake (龍捕りの資格, Ryū tori no shikaku); Flight 33: Ol' Harpoon (銛付き, Mori-tsuki); Flight 34: Showdown & Prosthetic (決闘と義足, Kettō to gisoku); Flight 35: Father & Daughter (父と娘, Chichi to musume)
7	November 7, 2019	978-4-06-517587-3	December 1, 2020	978-1-64651-036-8
Flight 36: Target Practice & Dragon Cubano (射撃と龍肉のクバーノサンド, Shageki to ryū niku no kubānosando); Flight 37: Engine Room & Dragon Meat Cake (機関室と龍肉のローストミートケーキ, Kikan-shitsu to ryū niku no rōsuto mīto keiki); Flight 38: Do or Die (命賭けの沈没ゲーム, Inochi kake no chinbotsu geimu); Flight 39: Majuro & Dragon Pepper Buns (マユーロと龍肉餡の胡椒, Mayūro to ryū niku an no koshō); Flight 40: The Red Lantern's Chilong & Dragon Crystals (赤提灯の赤龍と酒の肴, Aka chōchin no aka ryū to sake no sakana)
8	March 6, 2020	978-4-06-518878-1	March 16, 2021	978-1-64651-028-3
Flight 41: The Tian Shan Maze (天山迷路, Tenzan meiro); Flight 42: Stone-Grilled Tian Shan Steak (天山迷路と石焼きステーキ, Tenzan meiro to ishiyaki suteiki); Flight 43: Restart & Dragon Belly Bao (再出発と龍の角煮のパオサンド, Sai shuppatsu to ryū no kakuni no pao sando); Flight 44: The Skyfarer's Code (空の掟, Sora no okite); Flight 45: Conclusion & Fatty Tian Shan Sashimi (決着と天山龍の脂刺し, Kecchaku to Tenzan ryū no abura sashi)
9	September 7, 2020	978-4-06-520746-8	September 21, 2021	978-1-64651-216-4
Flight 46: The Legendary Ship Eater (伝説の船喰い, Densetsu no fune kui); Flight 47: Fundraising & Tian Shan Shan Long Rou (資金集めと天山涮龍肉, Shikin atsume to Tenzan Shuàn Long niku); Flight 48: The Industrial Capital of Meroe (工業都市・メロエ市, Kōgyō toshi Meroe-shi); Flight 49: Fallen Dragon & Arenan Lemon Pie (堕ちる龍とアレーナ風レモンパイ, Ochiru ryū to areina-fū remon pai); Flight 50: Live Catch (龍の生け捕り作戦, Ryū no ikedori sakusen)
10	March 5, 2021	978-4-06-522496-0	November 16, 2021	978-1-64651-287-4
Flight 51: Launching & Cook-off (解纜式と二人のコック, Kairan shiki to futari no kokku); Flight 52: New Channel (新たな針路, Arata na shinro); Flight 53: Jitters & Dragon Curry Tangine (焦燥と龍肉のカレータジン, Shōsō to ryū niku no karei tajin); Flight 54: Truth Within the Mists (霧の中の真実, Kiri no naka no shinjitsu); Flight 55: Encounter (遭遇, Sōgū); Flight 56: Dragon Lemonato & Reinforced Resolve (龍肉のレモナートと決意の再会, Ryū niku no remonāto to ketsui no saikai)
11	August 5, 2021	978-4-06-524377-0	November 29, 2022	978-1-64651-434-2
Flight 57: Lurkers in the Mist (霧から現れし者, Kiri kara araware shi mono); Flight 58: Tzita (ツィータ, Tsīta); Flight 59: Solo Battle (独りの闘い, Hitori no tatakai); Flight 60: Beyond the Mists (霧の向こうに, Kiri no mukō ni); Flight 61: Pit-steamed Dragon & Forewarnings of Farewells (龍肉の砂蒸し焼きと別れの予感, Ryū niku no suna mushiyaki to wakare no yokan); Special Flight: Dragon and Lentil Stew & Cloud Calling (龍肉とレンズ豆の煮込みと雲寄せ, Ryū niku to renzu mame no nikomi to kumo yose)
12	January 7, 2022	978-4-06-526554-3	February 14, 2023	978-1-64651-569-1
Flight 62: Pressed Terrine Redux & Singing Ceremony (二度目のプレステリーヌと調印式, Nidome no puresuterīnu to chōin-shiki); Flight 63: Dragons on the Wind (龍は風に乗って, Ryū wa kaze ni notte); Flight 64: Departure & Dragon Piccata w/ Dragon Egg Omelette (旅立ちと龍肉のピカタと龍卵のオ, Tabidachi to ryū-niku no pikata to ryū-tamago no omelette); Flight 65: Side Jobs & Scotch Eggs (副業と龍肉のミンスエッグ, Fukugyō to ryū-niku no minsu eggu); Flight 66: Blueprint & Engine Room Casserole (設計図と機関室のまかないキャセ, Sekkeizu to kikan-shitsu no makanai kyase)
13	July 7, 2022	978-4-06-528159-8	June 20, 2023	978-1-64651-688-9
Flight 67: Treasure Hunt & Salted Dragon Chow Mein (宝探しと龍の塩漬け肉の炒麺(チャウメン), Takarasagashi to ryū no shiozuke-niku no chāmen (chaumen)); Flight 68: Chasing Ghost Ships (幽霊船を追って, Yūreisen o otte); Flight 69: One Chance (チャンスは一度, Chansu wa ichido); Flight 70: Message (メッセージ, Messēji); Flight 71: New Ship & Dragon Pemmican (新たな船と龍のピミィカーン, Aratana fune to ryū no pimiikān)
14	December 7, 2022	978-4-06-529932-6	July 14, 2023	978-1-64651-689-6
Flight 72: Rite of Passage & Dragon Cookies (通過儀礼と龍脂のクッキー, Tsūka girei to ryū-abura no kukkī); Flight 73: Sandstorm & Dragon Steak (砂嵐と龍肉のステーキ, Sunaarashi to ryū-niku no sutēki); Flight 74: Rematch & Dragon Candies (再戦と龍のゼリーキャンディ, Saisen to ryū no zerī kyandi); Flight 75: Breakthrough (突破口, Toppakō); Flight 76: Final Curtain (幕を下ろす者, Maku o orosu mono)
15	May 8, 2023	978-4-06-531479-1	December 12, 2023	979-8-88877-030-6
Flight 77: End of Battle & Coarsely Chopped Dragon Burgers (戦いの終わりと龍の粗挽き手ごねハンバーグ, Tatakai no owari to ryū no arahiki-tegone hanbāgu); Flight 78: Under the Faraway Sky (遠い空の下で, Tōi sora no shita de); Flight 79: What a Draker Can Do (龍捕りにできること, Ryū-tori ni dekiru koto); Flight 80: Young Soldiers & Canned Soup (少年兵と缶詰のスープ, Shōnen-hei to kanzume no sūpu); Flight 81: An Old Man's Reason to Fly (オヤジが船に乗る理由, Oyaji ga fune ni noru riyū); Special Flight 2: A Draker Father & Son (龍捕りの父と子, Ryū-tori no chichi to ko)
16	November 7, 2023	978-4-06-533688-5	May 7, 2024	979-8-88877-031-3
Flight 82: Premonitions of Partings & Dragon Dolmas (出立の予感と龍肉の葡萄葉包み, Shuppatsu no yokan to ryū-niku no budō-ba-tsutsumi); Flight 83: The Deck Boss' Decision (甲板長の決断, Kōban-chō no ketsudan); Flight 84: A Newcomer's Circumstances & Dreams (新人の事情と夢, Shinjin no jijō to yume); Flight 85: Fear & Dragon Eye (恐れと龍の眼, Osore to ryū no me); Flight 86: Descender ("天下り", "Amakudari")
17	April 5, 2024	978-4-06-535016-4	April 21, 2026	979-8-88-877375-8
Flight 87: The Malotao Homeland (千剖士の故郷, Senboshi no kokyō); Flight 88: Uninvited Guests (招かれざる客, Manekarezaru kyaku); Flight 89: Wendigo the Voracious (暴食のウィンディゴ, Bōshoku no uindigo); Flight 90: The Dragon-Riding Helmsman (龍に乗る操舵手, Ryū ni noru sōdashu); Flight 91: Rangirara (空鳴り, Utsunari)
18	September 6, 2024	978-4-06-536764-3	October 20, 2026	979-8-88-877532-5
Flight 92: The Parasitic Dragons' Guidance (寄生龍の導き, Kiseiryū no michibiki); Flight 93: The Resolve to Take Away Such a Breathtaking View (景色を奪う覚悟, Keshiki o ubau kakugo); Flight 94: Invigorating Tan-Men & Satisfying Pudding (活力の湯麺と得心のプリン, Katsuryoku no tan-men to tokushin no purin); Flight 95: Processing the Descender ("天下り"の解体, "Amakudari" no kaitai); Flight 96: Traditional Hide Bag Roast (伝統の皮袋焼き, Dentō no kawa-bukuro yaki)
19	February 6, 2025	978-4-06-538387-2	—	—
Flight 97: A New Sky (新しい空, Atarashii sora); Flight 98: Adventures of the Bearded Drunkards (飲ん兵衛と鬚の冒険, Nonbei to hige no bōken); Flight 99: Fist-filled Memories & Fried Dragon Pie (あの日の拳と鶏肉の揚げパイ, Ano hi no kobushi to toriniku no age pai); Flight 100: Break Time White Stew with Meatballs (間隙の肉団子ミルク煮, Kangeki no nikudango miruku ni); Flight 101: Cold Weather Vodka & Lovingly Made Pemmican (寒空のウォッカと謹製ピミィカーン, Samuzora no vodka to kinsei pimiikān)
20	August 6, 2025	978-4-06-540404-1	—	—
Flight 102: Round Dragons & Bait (丸い龍と囮, Marui ryū to kotor); Flight 103: Blizzard and Lost Dice (吹雪と失せ物のサイコロ, Fubuki to usemono no saikoro); Flight 104: Blizzard Sailing and Ice Cream (吹雪の航行とアイスクリーム, Fubuki no kōkō to aisukurīmu); Flight 105: Deckmaster's Grumble (甲板長代理のぼやき, Kōhanchō dairi no boyaki); Flight 106: The Missing Hero and the Aurora Sandwich (消えた猛者とオーロラサンドイッチ, Kieta mosa to ōrora sandoicchi)
21	January 7, 2026	978-4-06-542159-8	—	—
Flight 107: The Ebon Emperor & The Lone Draker (南天の黒帝と孤高の龍捕り, Nantei no kurotei to kokō no orochi-tori); Flight 108: The Twin Dragons of the Antarctic (双龍の極圏, Sōryū no kyokken); Flight 109: Deadlock at the Pole (絶路の極圏攻防戦, Zejji no kyokken kōbō-sen); Flight 110: Father & Son & 20-Year Aged Dragon Spirits (親子と二十年熟成龍涎香酒, Oyako to nijūnen jukusei ryuzen kōshu); Flight 111: Memorial & Gratin (追悼とホワイトグラタン, Tsuitō to howaito guratan)
22	June 5, 2026	978-4-06-543803-9	—	—
Flight 112: Relaunch & Ebon Emperor's Stroganina (再出発と黒帝ストロガニナ, Sai shuppatsu to kurotei sutoroganina); Flight 113: Mute Man & Ebon Emperor's Dumplings (無口な男と黒帝餃子, Mukuchina otoko to kurotei gyōza); Flight 114: Skyfarers in Odeyak (大都市オデヤークと船員達の旅模様, Daitoshi odeyāku to sen'in-tachi no tabi moyō); Flight 115: A Night Atray & Dragon Hot Dogs (迷子の夜と龍肉ホットドッグ, Maigo no yoru to ryū niku hottodoggu); Flight 116: A Dragon Falls on the City (街に墜ちた龍, Machi ni ochita ryū)
23	November 6, 2026	978-4-06-545685-9	—	—

==== Chapters not yet in tankōbon format ====
- Flight 117: Changing Times & Dragon Jambalaya (変わる時代と龍肉ジャンバラヤ, Kawaru jidai to ryū niku janbaraya)
- Flight 118: Antiques & Salt-Baked Tail (古道具と塩釜包み蒸し焼き, Furudōgu to shiogama tsutsumi mushiyaki)
- Flight 119: A Journey of Trepidation (迷いの旅先, Mayoi no tabisaki)

=== Anime ===
An anime ONA adaptation was announced on March 15, 2019. The series was animated by Polygon Pictures and directed by Tadahiro Yoshihira, with Makoto Uezu handling series composition, Kyoko Kotani designing the characters, and Masaru Yokoyama composing the music. The series' 12-episode run premiered on Netflix Japan on January 9, 2020, which was the same day the series began its weekly television run on Fuji TV's +Ultra programming block, as well as Kansai TV, THK, TNC, UHB, and BS Fuji. Yoh Kamiyama performed the series' opening theme song "Gunjō", while Akai Ko-en performed the series' ending theme song "Zettai Reido". It ran for 12 episodes. The series premiered on Netflix worldwide on April 30, 2020.

==== Episode list ====
No.	Title	Original release date
1	"Quin Zaza"; Transliteration: "Kuin・Zaza-dō!" (Japanese: クィン・ザザ号)	January 9, 2020
2	"Bounty & Dragonet alla Diavola"; Transliteration: "Shōkin to Kyokushō Ryū no Akuma-Fū" (Japanese: 賞金と極小龍の悪魔風)	January 9, 2020
3	"Glittering Dragon"; Transliteration: "Hikaru Ryū to" (Japanese: 乗船理由と)	January 9, 2020
4	"Reasons for Flying & Dragon Terinne"; Transliteration: "Jōsen Riyū to Ryū no Terīnu" (Japanese: 乗船理由と龍のテリーヌ)	January 9, 2020
5	"Sky Pirates & Pastrami"; Transliteration: "Kūchū Kaizoku to Pasutorama" (Japanese: 空中海賊とパストラマ)	January 9, 2020
6	"Festival & Dragon Laghman"; Transliteration: "Matsuri to Ryū Niku no Te Nobe Mentsuyu" (Japanese: 祭りと龍肉の手延べ汁麵)	January 9, 2020
7	"Disaster & Edible Dragons"; Transliteration: "Taisai to Kueru Ryū" (Japanese: 大災と食える龍)	January 9, 2020
8	"Operation: Take Down the Rampaging Dragon"; Transliteration: "Abare Ryū Hokaku Sakusen" (Japanese: 暴れ龍捕獲作戦)	January 9, 2020
9	"Soup Kitchen Goulash & Dragon Cutlet"; Transliteration: "Takidashi no Kama ni to Ryū no Katsuretsu" (Japanese: 炊き出しの釜煮と龍のカツレツ)	January 9, 2020
10	"Migrating Dragons & the Chasm Depths"; Transliteration: "Watari Ryū to Tani no Soko" (Japanese: 渡り龍と谷の底)	January 9, 2020
11	"Dragonet & Dragon Hunter Brain Stew"; Transliteration: "Chīsai Ryū to Ryū Nō no Ryōshi Nabe" (Japanese: 小さい龍と龍脳の猟師鍋)	January 9, 2020
12	"Dragon Corridor"; Transliteration: "Ryū no Kairō" (Japanese: 龍の回廊)	January 9, 2020

== Reception ==
Drifting Dragons was nominated for the 52nd Seiun Award for the Media category in 2021.
