= Alan Lee (voice actor) =

American voice actor (born 1996)

- Lee in 2026
- Born: April 14, 1996 (age 30); Red Bluff, California, U.S.
- Occupation: Voice actor
- Years active: 2012–present
- Website: https://www.alanleevo.com

Alan Lee (born April 14, 1996) is an American voice actor known for his work in anime dubbing, animation, and video games. He has voiced characters in productions including KPop Demon Hunters, Great Pretender, Mortal Kombat 1, Jujutsu Kaisen, The Rising of the Shield Hero, and The Ghost and Molly McGee.

== Career ==
Lee was born in Red Bluff, California, and began performing on stage at the age of eight. He started pursuing voice acting professionally at seventeen and relocated to Los Angeles. He is affiliated with studios including Bang Zoom! Entertainment, Crunchyroll (formerly Funimation), VSI Los Angeles, and NYAV Post.

Lee's early anime roles included Ledo in the English dub of Gargantia on the Verdurous Planet and Junpei Hyūga in Kuroko's Basketball. In 2020, he was cast as protagonist Makoto Edamura in the English dub of Wit Studio's Great Pretender for Netflix. That same year, he voiced Kohaku in the English dub of Yashahime: Princess Half-Demon.

In video games, Lee voiced Shang Tsung in Mortal Kombat 1 (2023) and Roland Glenbrook in Triangle Strategy (2022). He has also voiced characters in Final Fantasy VII Rebirth, Genshin Impact, and Pokémon Masters EX.

In 2025, Lee voiced Mystery Saja, a member of the antagonist demon boy band Saja Boys, in the Sony Pictures Animation film KPop Demon Hunters. The film went on to win the Academy Award for Best Animated Feature at the 98th Academy Awards. He also had a recurring role as Oliver "Ollie" Chen in the Disney Channel series The Ghost and Molly McGee.

In late 2025, Lee was cast as the English voice of Naoya Zen'in in the third season of Jujutsu Kaisen. Screen Rant profiled Lee as "a rising star in anime voice acting", noting his crossover from KPop Demon Hunters into the Jujutsu Kaisen franchise. The casting was formally announced by Crunchyroll in January 2026.
