= SSS-Class Revival Hunter =

South Korean web novel

SSS급 죽어야 사는 헌터 RR: SSSgeup jugeoya saneun heonteo MR: SSSkŭp chugŏya sanŭn hŏnt'ŏ
- Genre: Adventure, fantasy
- Author: Sinnoa; Neida (adaptation)
- Illustrator: Bill K
- English publisher: NA: Yen Press
- Webtoon service: KakaoPage (South Korea); Piccoma (Japan); Tapas (English)
- Original run: December 31, 2020
- Anime television series
- Directed by: Hiroaki Sakurai
- Written by: Sayuri Ōba
- Music by: Ryo Kawasaki; Tomoyuki Kono
- Studio: Studio Fu
- Licensed by: Crunchyroll
- Original network: Fuji TV (+Ultra)
- Original run: January 2027 – scheduled

SSS-Class Revival Hunter (Korean: SSS급 죽어야 사는 헌터, romanized: SSSgeub Jug-eoya Saneun Heonteo, Japanese: 死して生きるSSS級ハンター, romanized: Shishite Ikiru SSS-kyū Hunter) is a South Korean web novel written by Sinnoa. It was serialized via the digital platform Munpia from November 2018 to May 2020. A manhwa adaptation, which was released as a webtoon, adapted by Neida, and illustrated by Bill K, has been serialized online via Kakao's digital comic and fiction platform KakaoPage since December 2020. An anime television series adaptation produced by Studio Fu is set to premiere in January 2027.

== Plot ==
A "Tower" has appeared, full of monsters to hunt and giving people Skill Cards that give them powers. Gongja Kim lives a dull life, wishing he could be like the famous Hunter Sooha Yoo, the "Flame Emperor". Then one day the Tower grants him a Skill Card, giving him the power to copy other people's skills... but only if the person kills him. Distraught at having obtained such a useless skill, he later witnesses Sooha Yoo commit murder. Sooha finds him and kills him, causing Gongja's skill to copy the one skill that can make it usable: Regression, the power to send his mind 24 hours back in time upon his death. Waking up one day in the past with his copied skill still intact, Gongja realizes he now has a chance to become the powerful hunter he dreamed of being.

== Characters ==
Kim Gongja
Voiced by: Takeo Ōtsuka
Sword Emperor
Voiced by: Satoshi Hino
Flame Emperor
Voiced by: Toshiki Masuda
Witch of the Black Dragon
Voiced by: Megumi Han
Paladin
Voiced by: Sayaka Kinoshita
Countess
Voiced by: Risa Shimizu
Poisonous Viper
Voiced by: Makoto Furukawa
Inquisitor
Voiced by: Natsumi Fujiwara
Master Alchemist
Voiced by: Yuka Iguchi
Blade Saint
Voiced by: Shunsuke Sakuya

== Media ==
=== Novel ===
Written by Sinnoa, the web novel began serialization on the digital platform Munpia on November 20, 2018. Its serialization finished on May 7, 2020. J Plus Media published the novel in print in 16 volumes. Wuxiaworld published the novel in English digitally.

=== Manhwa ===
A manhwa adaptation, which was released as a webtoon, adapted by Neida, and illustrated by Bill K, began serialization on Kakao's platform KakaoPage on December 31, 2020. It is published in English digitally by Tapas. At Anime NYC 2023, Yen Press' Ize Press imprint announced that they would be publishing the webtoon in print. As of July 2025, four volumes have been published, with a fifth set for December 2026.

=== Anime ===
An anime television series adaptation was announced on September 10, 2026. It will be produced by Studio Fu and directed by Hiroaki Sakurai, with scripts written by Sayuri Ōba and characters designed by Takahiro Yoshimatsu, and music composed by Ryo Kawasaki and Tomoyuki Kono. The series is set to premiere in January 2027 on Fuji TV's +Ultra programming block. The ending theme song is "Faded", performed by The Spellbound and Boom Boom Satellites. Crunchyroll will stream the series.
