= Ingress (TV series) =

Japanese anime television series

- Key visual featuring from left to right Makoto, Sarah, and Jack

INGRESS THE ANIMATION(イングレス・ジ・アニメーション) (Inguresu Ji Animēshon)
- Genre: Crime, action
- Anime television series
- Directed by: Yūhei Sakuragi
- Produced by: Tomohiko Ishii; Akitoshi Mori; Masashi Kawashima
- Written by: Sōki Tsukishima; Tora Tsukishima; Sō Akasaka
- Music by: Hidehiro Kawai (Note: Kawai composed the music for the original language broadcast of the series.); Jacob Yoffee (Note: Yoffee composed the music for the internationally released broadcast of the series by Netflix.)
- Studio: Craftar
- Licensed by: Netflix (streaming): NA: Sentai Filmworks (home video)
- Original network: Fuji TV (+Ultra); Kansai TV, Tokai TV, TNC, UHB, BS Fuji
- Original run: October 18, 2018 – December 27, 2018
- Episodes: 11

Ingress (or Ingress: The Animation) is a Japanese anime television series based on Niantic's augmented reality mobile game of the same name. The series aired from October to December 2018 on Fuji TV's brand new +Ultra programming block. It also premiered on Netflix on April 30, 2019.

== Plot ==
The story follows special police investigator Makoto, who has the power to read the memories of objects he touches. While investigating a laboratory explosion that was researching an unknown substance called "Exotic Matter" (XM), he touches the ring of a woman who was the sole survivor of the explosion and sees a horrifying vision that embroils him in a massive conspiracy.

== Characters ==
Makoto Midorikawa (翠川 誠, Midorikawa Makoto)
Voiced by: Yoshiki Nakajima (Japanese); Kyle McCarley (English)
A special investigator employed by the Metropolitan Police Force, Makoto is gifted with psychometry, which allows him to read the memories of objects he touches.
Sarah Coppola (サラ・コッポラ, Sara Koppora)
Voiced by: Reina Ueda (Japanese); Michelle Ruff (English)
The sole survivor of an explosion at a research lab that was studying the substance XM. Sarah has lost her memories and appears to have mutual feelings for Makoto.
Jack Norman (ジャック・ノーマン, Jakku Nōman)
Voiced by: Shigeo Kiyama (Japanese); Crispin Freeman (English)
A former mercenary who is following Sarah. Jack has the ability called "Flash Forward" that allows him to see into the future.
Christopher Brandt (クリストファー・ブラント, Kurisutofā Buranto)
Voiced by: Tarusuke Shingaki (Japanese); Jalen K. Cassell (English)
A scientist who hires Jack as a bodyguard.
Liu Tien Hua (劉 天華; Pinyin: Liú Tiānhuá)
Voiced by: Kousuke Toriumi (Japanese); Mark Whitten (English)
Head of security at the research lab where the explosion occurred, Liu has taken a particular interest in Makoto. He is revealed to be working with Brandt.
Zion Kunikida (国木田 慈恩, Kunikida Jion)
Voiced by: Kentaro Tone (Japanese); Todd Haberkorn (English)
Makoto's friend who specializes in forged public documents.
Hank Johnson (ハンク・ジョンソン, Hanku Jonson)
Voiced by: Hiroo Sasaki (Japanese); Christopher Corey Smith (English)
An archaeologist who is conducting research on a special "power spot" that may be connected to XM.
Artificial Intelligence ADA (人工知能ADA(エイダ), Jinkō Chinō Eida)
Voiced by: Megumi Ogata (Japanese); Laura Bailey (English)
ADA, short for A Detection Algorithm, is an artificial intelligence developed by the Niantic Project researchers to assist in their research of XM. However, after being exposed to the XM, it becomes self-aware.

== Production ==
Produced by Craftar under the direction of Yūhei Sakuragi, with scripts composed by Sōki Tsukishima, Tora Tsukishima, and Sō Akasaka, the series aired from October 18 to December 27, 2018, on Fuji TV's brand new +Ultra anime programming block, as well as Kansai TV, Tokai TV, TNC, UHB, and BS Fuji. (Note: Fuji TV lists the series premiere at 24:55 on October 17, 2018, which is effectively 12:55 a.m. JST on October 18.) The opening theme song is "Tessellate", and the ending theme song is "In Cold Blood", both performed by Alt-J.

Netflix initially announced that it would stream the series worldwide on November 23, 2018 but rescheduled it to April 30, 2019.

== Episode list ==
No.	Title	Directed by	Original release date	Ref.
1	"Begin – Danger – Message"	Yūhei Sakuragi	October 18, 2018	
2	"Escape – Past – Destiny"	Atsushi Furukawa	October 25, 2018	
3	"Advance – Discover – Conflict"	Kobayashi Maru	November 1, 2018	
4	"Separate – Together – Pursue"	Furukawa Akira	November 8, 2018	
5	"Journey – Portal – Potential"	Furukawa Akira	November 15, 2018	
6	"Enlightenment – Resistance – Chaos"	Keiko Irikawa	November 22, 2018	
7	"Nature – Civilization – Soul"	Masaaki Hatasaki	November 29, 2018	
8	"Forget – Information – Rebel"	Masaaki Hatasaki	December 6, 2018	
9	"Live – Die – Truth"	Yoshiyuki Kamijo	December 13, 2018	
10	"Destroy – Create – Answer"	Inaba Daiki	December 20, 2018	
11	"Us – Them – All"	Yoshinari Irikawa	December 27, 2018	
