= Ajin: Demi-Human =

Japanese manga series and its adaptations

- First tankōbon volume cover

亜人 (Ajin)
- Genre: Action; Dark fantasy; Supernatural thriller
- Manga
- Written by: Gamon Sakurai; Tsuina Miura (vol. 1)
- Published by: Kodansha
- English publisher: NA: Vertical
- Magazine: Good! Afternoon
- Original run: July 6, 2012 – February 5, 2021
- Volumes: 17
- Anime film series

Ajin Part 1: Shōdō; Ajin Part 2: Shōtotsu; Ajin Part 3: Shōgeki
- Directed by: Hiroyuki Seshita (chief); Hiroaki Andō
- Written by: Hiroshi Seko
- Music by: Yugo Kanno
- Studio: Polygon Pictures
- Licensed by: NA: Sentai Filmworks
- Released: November 27, 2015 (part 1); May 6, 2016 (part 2); September 23, 2016 (part 3)
- Runtime: 103 minutes (part 1); 106 minutes (part 2); 121 minutes (part 3)
- Anime television series
- Directed by: Hiroyuki Seshita (chief); Hiroaki Andō
- Produced by: Hiroshi Kamei; Kōtarō Sudō; Yoshihiko Yamazaki; Hideyuki Saitō; Masaya Saitō
- Written by: Hiroshi Seko
- Music by: Yugo Kanno
- Studio: Polygon Pictures
- Licensed by: Netflix (streaming rights); AUS: Madman Entertainment; NA: Sentai Filmworks (home video distribution rights); UK: Anime Limited
- Original network: MBS, TBS, CBC TV, BS-TBS
- Original run: January 16, 2016 – December 24, 2016
- Episodes: 26
- Original video animation
- Directed by: Hiroyuki Seshita (chief); Hiroaki Andō
- Produced by: Kōtarō Sudō; Yoshihiko Yamazaki
- Written by: Hiroshi Seko
- Music by: Yugo Kanno
- Studio: Polygon Pictures
- Licensed by: NA: Sentai Filmworks
- Released: May 6, 2016 – April 7, 2017
- Runtime: 21–24 minutes each
- Episodes: 3
- Live-action film
- Directed by: Katsuyuki Motohiro
- Written by: Masahiro Yamaura; Hiroshi Seko
- Music by: Yugo Kanno
- Studio: Toho Pictures; Production I.G
- Released: September 30, 2017
- Runtime: 109 minutes
- icon

Ajin: Demi-Human (Japanese: 亜人, Hepburn: Ajin) is a Japanese manga series written and illustrated by Gamon Sakurai. It was serialized in Kodansha's seinen manga magazine Good! Afternoon from July 2012 to February 2021, with its chapters collected in seventeen tankōbon volumes. In North America, it has been licensed for English release by Vertical.

It was adapted into a 3D anime film trilogy by Polygon Pictures between November 2015 and September 2016. An anime television series adaptation, also by Polygon Pictures, aired between January and April 2016, with a second season aired from October to December 2016. A live-action film adaptation was released in September 2017.

== Plot ==
Ajin presents the story of a student named Nagai Kei, who discovers he is an "Ajin" when he is fatally wounded in a traffic accident. In the world of Ajin, a small number of humans (termed "Ajin") possess immortality and extreme regenerative abilities that trigger upon death, allowing them to completely recover from any mortal injury in a matter of seconds. Ajin can also create "black ghosts", highly dangerous combat-oriented entities that are only visible to other Ajin. "Black ghosts" are resistant to physical injury, exhibit extraordinary physical strength, and have sharp teeth and claws. Different "black ghosts" have varying degrees of intelligence: most are completely reliant on their Ajin for directions, and others, such as Kei's, are more independent and likely to engage in self-initiated actions.

Consequently, Ajin are considered dangerous and inhuman by the public, and most are captured by governments. Governments claim to protect Ajin, but in reality, most use them as subjects for cruel and inhumane experiments, as their abilities to completely recover from fatal wounds provides an unlimited source of organs and bodies in dangerous tests (such as live-fire weapons testing). As a result, Ajin that have escaped from government custody (such as Satou, the main antagonist) are bent on exacting revenge on governments. Kei, however, wants no part in the emerging Ajin–human conflict, but forms an agreement with Japanese governmental agents to fight Satou in exchange for his freedom from government experimentation.

== Characters ==
=== Kei's Group ===
Kei Nagai (永井 圭, Nagai Kei)
Voiced by: Mamoru Miyano (Japanese); Johnny Yong Bosch (English)
Played by: Takeru Satoh
Kei first discovers that he is an Ajin after being killed in a traffic accident. To his peers, he appears to be a normal and carefree student, but in reality he is emotionally detached from other people and often willing to endanger the lives of other people in order for him to accomplish his own goals. He differs from most Ajin as he has the ability to create an abnormally large amount of IBM (Invisible Black Matter, which is key to an Ajin's regeneration and ability to create "black ghosts"), allowing Kei to manifest more "black ghosts" than his Ajin peers. According to Ikuya, he is implied to have manifested his Ajin-related abilities at a very young age.
Kaito (海斗)
Voiced by: Yoshimasa Hosoya (Japanese); Bryce Papenbrook (English)
A close friend of Kei who helps him to escape from the police. He was later sent to prison for assisting in Kei's escape and later befriends Takeshi, another Ajin, allowing Kaito to escape imprisonment.
Kō Nakano (中野 攻, Nakano Kō)
Voiced by: Jun Fukuyama (Japanese); Griffin Burns (English)
Kō is an Ajin and a partner of Kei with the intention to stop Satō, as Satō's plans for the creation of an Ajin-led government will lead to the loss of many human lives. Unlike Kei, who is indifferent and cold to others, Kō values friendship and is willing to put the safety of others above his own. He is also physically fitter than Kei, but lacks Kei's intellectual capabilities, often relying on Kei for planning in combat operations, with him acting as the "muscle" of the operation. Kō has the rapid regenerative abilities common to Ajin, but lacks the ability to manifest his own "black ghost".

=== Ministry of Health, Labour and Welfare ===
Yū Tosaki (戸崎 優, Tosaki Yū)
Voiced by: Takahiro Sakurai (Japanese); Todd Haberkorn (English)
Played by: Tetsuji Tamayama
Yū is the head of Ajin Research under the Ministry of Health, Labour and Welfare and has a comatose fiancée, Ai. He is protected by an Ajin bodyguard named Izumi Shimomura. He agrees to let Kei work with him to stop Satō on the condition that Kei is allowed to live a normal life afterwards.
Izumi Shimomura (下村 泉, Shimomura Izumi) / Yōko Tainaka (田井中 陽子, Tainaka Yōko)
Voiced by: Mikako Komatsu (Japanese); Cristina Vee (English)
Played by: Rina Kawaei
Izumi is a stoic and taciturn Ajin working for Yū Tosaki at the Ministry of Health, Labour and Welfare. Izumi's birth name is Yōko Tainaka. As Yōko, she first discovered her Ajin abilities in her teenage years, when she first died after defending herself from a rape attempt of an abusive stepfather. Yōko would run away from home, where she is eventually recruited by Yū as a bodyguard under a special contract. The contract allowed Yōko to adopt the alias of "Izumi Shinomura", such that "Yōko Tainaka" is legally deceased and that "Izumi Shimomura" is a separate identity. She affectionately refers to her "black ghost" as "Kuro".
Sokabe (曽我部)
Voiced by: Kenichi Suzumura (Japanese); Bea Billany (English)
Yū's junior at the Ministry who was also assigned to supervise Yū. After Yū decides to defy orders from the Minister of Health, Labour and Welfare, Sokabe was appointed as his successor.

=== Ajin ===
Satō (佐藤, Satō) / Samuel T. Owen (サミュエル・T・オーウェン, Samyueru Tī Ōwen)
Voiced by: Hōchū Ōtsuka (Japanese); Pete Sepenuk (English)
Played by: Gō Ayano
The leader of the pro-Ajin movement, also known as Hat (帽子, Bōshi) due to his signature flat cap hat, Satō is a calm and collected individual who is well known within the Ministry of Health, Labour and Welfare as the most dangerous Ajin. Despite his appearance as a genial old man who enjoys video gaming, he is, in reality, a sinister, calculating tactician with combat experience as a former special operations Marine in the USMC. Satō originally claims that he wishes to protest against the mistreatment of Ajins worldwide, but it is later revealed that he uses this claim as an excuse to gather an army of Ajin under his command to create an immortal army to rule Japan and simply for the sake of violence and destruction. He is frequently described as a "player" in the latter half of the anime, as he is prone to using strategies adapted from video games to carry out assassinations of famous politicians in order to force negotiations with the government for allowing rights of Ajins. He enjoys the use of violence against anybody (human or Ajin) who attempts to disrupt his plans and is especially irked by provocation.
Kōji Tanaka (田中 功次, Tanaka Kōji)
Voiced by: Daisuke Hirakawa (Japanese); Keith Silverstein (English)
Played by: Yu Shirota
He is the second Ajin to be discovered in Japan. He was rescued by Satō from brutal experimentation and joins in with his pro-Ajin movement against the Japanese government.
Masumi Okuyama (奥山 真澄, Okuyama Masumi)
Voiced by: Hiroyuki Yoshino (Japanese); Lucien Dodge (English)
Played by: Yudai Chiba
Masumi is one of the few Ajins who accepts Satō's invitation to use genocide to fight for Ajins' rights. He is a skilled hacker knowledgeable in weaponry and machines. In the anime, he eventually betrays Satō and reaches out to Kei in order to defeat him.
Takeshi Kotobuki (琴吹 武, Kotobuki Takeshi)
Voiced by: Sōma Saitō
A prisoner who had escaped from jail after seeing Sato's announcement to protest for Ajins' rights. Takeshi becomes Kaito's partner after Kaito helped him when he was bullied by the other prisoners wanting to know how he had escaped from jail. His IBM has wings, which was his means of escape from prison. After he and Kai reconcile he promises to let Kai use his IBM to escape prison if, for whatever reason, he wishes to escape in order to assist Kei. In the anime, Takeshi uses his IBM to bring himself as well as Kai to Eriko's hospital in order to save both her and Kei from the riots occurring there.

=== Others ===
Eriko Nagai (永井 慧理子, Nagai Eriko)
Voiced by: Aya Suzaki
Played by: Minami Hamabe
Kei's sister who seems to suffer from a terminal illness and is hospitalized throughout most of the series.
Ikuya Ogura (オグラ・イクヤ, Ogura Ikuya)
Voiced by: Hiroyuki Kinoshita (Japanese); Kyle McCarley (English)
He is a Japanese-American researcher who studied Ajins in the United States and has a great deal of knowledge about them.

== Media ==
=== Manga ===
Ajin: Demi-Human is written and illustrated by Gamon Sakurai. Initially, it was written by Tsuina Miura; however, his name is not mentioned in the credits after the first volume, and Sakurai had been creating the manga himself since. The series was published in Kodansha's seinen manga magazine Good! Afternoon from July 6, 2012, to February 5, 2021, and was collected into seventeen volumes.

In February 2014, Vertical announced that it had licensed the series for English release. On March 15, 2014, Crunchyroll began to release the series on their manga service under the title Ajin: Demi-Human, starting with the first two chapters.

==== Volumes ====
No.	Original release date	Original ISBN	English release date	English ISBN
1	March 7, 2013	978-4-06-387868-4	October 14, 2014	978-1-939130-84-6
01. "Detection and Subsequent Action" (発覚とその後の行動について, Hakkaku to Sonogo no Kōdō ni Tsuite); 02. "First Day, Midnight Phenomenon" (1日目、深夜の事象について, 1-Nichi-me, shinya no Jishō ni Tsuite); 03. "Escape and Threat" (逃走と脅威について, Tōsō to Kyōi ni Tsuite); 04. "Interrogation and Aid" (尋問と協力者について, Jinmon to Kyōryoku-sha ni Tsuite); 05. "Emergence and Organization" (発現と組織について, Hatsugen to Soshiki ni Tsuite)
2	June 7, 2013	978-4-06-387902-5	December 9, 2014	978-1-939130-85-3
06. "Fresh Start" (心機一転, Shinki Itten); 07. "003"; 08. "Blindness"; 09. "Killtacular" (キルタキュラー, Kirutakyurā); 00. "The Shinya Nakamura Incident" (中村慎也事件, Nakamura Shin'ya Jiken)
3	November 7, 2013	978-4-06-387934-6	February 3, 2015	978-1-941220-21-4
10. "The Real Kei Nagai ①" (本当の永井 圭①, Hontō no Nagai Kei 1); 11. "The Real Kei Nagai ②" (本当の永井 圭②, Hontō no Nagai Kei 2); 12. "The Real Kei Nagai ③" (本当の永井 圭③, Hontō no Nagai Kei 3); 13. "Op A" (作戦A, Sakusen A); 14. "Backstage" (舞台裏, Butaiura)
4	May 7, 2014	978-4-06-387972-8	April 7, 2015	978-1-941220-44-3
15. "Fighter" (ファイター, Faitā); 16. "The Fugitive" (逃亡者, Tōbō-sha); 17. "Double Team" (ダブルチーム, Daburu Chīmu); 18. "Fringe" (フリンジ, Furinji); 19. "Go Big or Go Home!" (派手に行こうぜ!, Hade ni Ikōze!)
5	November 7, 2014	978-4-06-388007-6	June 2, 2015	978-1-941220-45-0
20. "Sucker Punch" (サッカーパンチ, Sakkā Panchi); 21. "Battlefield: Bad Company" (バトルフィールド バッドカンパニー, Batorufīrudo: Baddo Kanpanī); 22. "Demi-Human" (亜人, Ajin); 23. "The Chosen One" (選ばれた男, Erabareta Otoko); 24. "Come with Me!!"
6	June 5, 2015	978-4-06-388067-0	August 25, 2015	978-1-941220-88-7
25. "Day One" (初日, Shonichi); 26. "Genius...?!"; 27. "Izumi Shimomura" (下村 泉, Shimomura Izumi); 28. "Walls" (壁, Kabe)
7	November 6, 2015	978-4-06-388098-4	March 22, 2016	978-1-942993-26-1
29. "Listen!!"; 30. "Call of Duty"; 31. "Don't say 'lazy'"; 32. "The Attack Begins" (攻撃開始, Kōgeki Kaishi); 33. "Invincible" (無敵, Muteki)
8	May 6, 2016	978-4-06-388137-0	October 18, 2016	978-1-942993-47-6
34. "Splinter Cell" (スプリンターセル, Supurintā Seru); 35. "The Man Trap"; 36. "Doom"; 37. "Shadowrun" (シャドウラン, Shadōran); 38. "Battlefield Hardline" (バトルフィールド ハードライン, Batorufīrudo Hādorain)
9	October 7, 2016	978-4-06-388189-9	April 4, 2017	978-1-945054-19-8
39. "Battlefield Hardline ②" (バトルフィールドハードライン ②, Batorufīrudo Hādorain 2); 40. "Battlefield Hardline ③" (バトルフィールドハードライン ③, Batorufīrudo Hādorain 3); 41. "Party's End" (祭りのあと, Matsuri no Ato); 42. "Hirasawa" (平沢); 43. "A Fight" (ケンカ, Kenka)
10	April 7, 2017	978-4-06-388248-3	October 10, 2017	978-1-945054-28-0
44. "Lineage" (血筋, Chisuji); 45. "U & I"; 46. "Good Morning, See You Tomorrow" (おはよう、またあした, Ohayō, Mata Ashita); 47. "Call of Duty: Infinite Warfare"; 48. "The Losers" (負け犬共, Makeinu Domo)
11	September 7, 2017	978-4-06-388285-8	May 8, 2018	978-1-945054-69-3
49. "Steep Road" (スティープ ロード, Sutīpu Rōdo); 50. "Promised Land" (約束の地, Yakusoku no Chi); 51. "Fury" (フューリー, Fyūrī); 52. "When, Where, Who"; 53. "Conviction" (コンヴィクション, Konvikushon)
12	May 7, 2018	978-4-06-511462-9	October 9, 2018	978-1-947194-20-5
54. "Greater Cause" (大義, Taigi); 55. "Paradise" (楽園, Rakuen); 56. "Rolling Star"; 57. "Beyond Logic" (論理を越えて, Ronri o Koete)
13	November 7, 2018	978-4-06-513444-3	September 17, 2019	978-1-947194-60-1
58. "Everything that has a beginning has an end."; 59. "H-hour"; 60. "D-day"; 61. "ADGp"; 62. "Trash Mobs"
14	June 7, 2019	978-4-06-516045-9	March 17, 2020	978-1-949980-11-0
63. "Strike Back"; 64. "Him" (彼, Kare); 65. "The Showdown Comes" (対立の時, Tairitsu no Toki); 66. "Dead Heat" (デッドヒート, Deddohīto); 67. "Victory" (勝利, Shōri)
15	November 7, 2019	978-4-06-517509-5	August 11, 2020	978-1-949980-35-6
68. "Fresh Slate" (破算, Hasan); 69. "Kaito" (海斗); 70. "Dedication" (献辞, Kenji); 71. "Deliberation" (熟考, Jukukō); 72. "Limit" (限界, Genkai); 73. "The Worst" (最悪, Saiaku)
16	May 7, 2020	978-4-06-519476-8	February 23, 2021	978-1-949980-65-3
74. "Flood" (フラッド, Furaddo); 75. "Leap into the Unknown" (未知への飛翔, Michi e no Hishō); 76. "Diehards"; 77. "Paean" (賛歌, Sanka); 78. "Final Run" (ファイナル ラン, Fainaru Ran)
17	May 7, 2021	978-4-06-522989-7	September 21, 2021	978-1-647290-45-0
79. Purorōgu (プロローグ) (Note: Chapter 79 is untitled in the English release.); 80. "The One"; 81. "Even If We've Got Nothing" (なには なくとも, Naniwa Nakutomo); 82. "At the End of the Journey" (旅の終わりに, Tabi no Owari ni); 83. "As Long as It Lasts" (つづく限り, Tsuzuku Kagiri)

=== Film ===
Plans to adapt the series into an anime film trilogy were announced in June 2015. The films were directed by Hiroaki Andō and written by Hiroshi Seko, with animation by Polygon Pictures. The first film, titled Ajin: Shōdō (Ajin: Impulse), debuted in Japan on November 27, 2015. This film is a compilation of the first six episodes of the TV series. The second film, titled Ajin: Shōtotsu (Ajin: Collision), debuted in Japan on May 6, 2016, and the third and final film in the trilogy, titled Ajin: Shōgeki (Ajin: Clash), was released on September 23, 2016.

=== Anime ===
A television series version of the anime films premiered on January 16, 2016. (Note: The episode is listed for broadcast at 25:55 on January 15; this is the same as a broadcast time of 1:55 on January 16.) It is produced by the staff that produced the film trilogy. It aired on MBS, TBS, CBC and BS-TBS, with 13 episodes. The series was streamed by Netflix, starting on April 12, 2016, along with English, French, Spanish, German and Brazilian Portuguese dubs. The series is licensed by Sentai Filmworks for home video release in North America. An OAD was bundled with the manga's 8th limited-edition volume, which was released on May 6, 2016. A second OAD was bundled with manga's 9th limited-edition volume, which was released on October 7, 2016. A third OAD was bundled with manga's 10th limited-edition volume, which was released on April 7, 2017. A second season premiered on October 8, 2016, and continued the original numbering sequence, and premiered on Netflix on December 27, 2016.

=== Live-action film ===
The production of a live-action film was announced in November 2016, with release on September 30, 2017. The director is Katsuyuki Motohiro, with Takeru Satoh in the lead role. The action scenes were planned by the team behind the Rurouni Kenshin films, which also starred Satoh. The additional cast includes Tetsuji Tamayama, Rina Kawaei, Minami Hamabe, Yuu Shirota, Yudai Chiba and Yuki Yamada.

== Reception ==
The Japanese manga news site Comic Natalie awarded the series third place in its poll of the best manga in 2013. The third volume ranked 6th on the Oricon manga chart on the week of its release. In a survey of 400 manga and publishing professionals for the manga guidebook Kono Manga ga Sugoi!, the series was rated 3rd place in a list of top 20 manga for Male readers. The manga had over 4 million copies in print as of December 2015.

The series was listed as a nominee for the 18th Tezuka Osamu Cultural Prize's Readers Award, and in the 38th Kodansha Manga Awards for the general category.
