= Kaina of the Great Snow Sea =

Japanese anime television series

- Key visual

大雪海のカイナ (Ōyukiumi no Kaina)
- Genre: High fantasy
- Created by: Tsutomu Nihei; Polygon Pictures
- Manga
- Written by: Tsutomu Nihei
- Illustrated by: Itoe Takemoto
- Published by: Kodansha
- English publisher: Crunchyroll; Kodansha USA
- Magazine: Monthly Shōnen Sirius
- Original run: February 26, 2022 – June 26, 2024
- Volumes: 4
- Anime television series
- Directed by: Hiroaki Ando
- Produced by: Akitoshi Mori; Yumi Hamamoto
- Written by: Sadayuki Murai; Tetsuya Yamada
- Music by: Kohta Yamamoto; Misaki Umase
- Studio: Polygon Pictures
- Licensed by: Crunchyroll; SA/SEA: Medialink
- Original network: Fuji TV (+Ultra)
- Original run: January 12, 2023 – March 23, 2023
- Episodes: 11
- Anime film

Kaina of the Great Snow Sea: Star Sage
- Directed by: Hiroaki Ando
- Produced by: Akitoshi Mori; Yumi Hamamoto
- Written by: Sadayuki Murai; Tetsuya Yamada
- Music by: Kohta Yamamoto; Misaki Umase
- Studio: Polygon Pictures
- Licensed by: Crunchyroll
- Released: October 13, 2023
- Runtime: 99 minutes

Kaina of the Great Snow Sea (大雪海のカイナ, Ōyukiumi no Kaina) is an original Japanese anime television series created by Tsutomu Nihei and animated by Polygon Pictures to commemorate the studio's 40th anniversary. The series aired from January to March 2023 on Fuji TV's +Ultra programming block. A manga adaptation with art by Itoe Takemoto was serialized in Kodansha's shōnen manga magazine Monthly Shōnen Sirius between February 2022 and June 2024. A sequel anime film titled Kaina of the Great Snow Sea: Star Sage premiered in Japanese theaters in October 2023. Crunchyroll holds the license of both the manga and the anime.

== Plot ==
Kaina lives on a world covered in an organic membrane called the Canopy, created by massive Orbital Spire Trees. Far beneath the Canopy at the foot of the Orbital Spire Trees lies the endless Snow Sea, where Princess Ririha and her country of Atland struggle to survive against the cold and the rival nation of Valghia. When Ririha travels to the Canopy in a desperate bid to save her country, she is rescued by Kaina, setting in motion events that will have the pair travel the world to uncover its secrets.

== Characters ==
Kaina (カイナ)
Voiced by: Yoshimasa Hosoya
Ririha (リリハ, Ririha)
Voiced by: Rie Takahashi
Yaona (ヤオナ)
Voiced by: Ayumu Murase
Amerote (アメロテ)
Voiced by: Maaya Sakamoto
Olinoga (オリノガ, Orinoga)
Voiced by: Katsuyuki Konishi
Ngapoji (ンガポージ, Ngapōji)
Voiced by: Tomokazu Sugita
Handagil (ハンダーギル, Handāgiru)
Voiced by: Nobuyuki Hiyama
Halesola (ハレソラ, Haresora)
Voiced by: Kenyu Horiuchi

== Media ==
=== Manga ===
A manga adaptation illustrated by Itoe Takemoto was serialized in Kodansha's shōnen manga magazine Monthly Shōnen Sirius between February 26, 2022, and June 26, 2024. The manga's chapters were collected into four tankōbon volumes released from December 8, 2022, to October 8, 2024.

Crunchyroll published the manga in English and worldwide. During their panel at Anime Expo 2023, Kodansha USA announced that they licensed the manga for English publication, with the first volume released on June 25, 2024, and the last on August 5, 2025.

No.	Original release date	Original ISBN	English release date	English ISBN
1	December 8, 2022	978-4-06-530020-6	June 25, 2024	978-1-64-729347-5
2	February 9, 2023	978-4-06-530763-2	August 27, 2024	978-1-64-729357-4
3	October 6, 2023	978-4-06-533498-0	October 22, 2024	978-1-64-729364-2
4	October 8, 2024	978-4-06-537064-3	August 5, 2025	978-1-64-729398-7

=== Anime ===
The original anime television series created by Tsutomu Nihei and animated by Polygon Pictures to commemorate the studio's 40th anniversary was announced on January 20, 2022. The series is directed by Hiroaki Ando, written by Sadayuki Murai and Tetsuya Yamada, with main theme written by Hiroyuki Sawano, and music by Kohta Yamamoto and Misaki Umase. It premiered from January 12 to March 23, 2023, on Fuji TV's +Ultra programming block. The first four episodes were previously screened at Crunchyroll Expo 2022. Yorushika performed the opening theme song "Telepath" (テレパス, Terepasu), while Greeeen performed the ending theme song "Juvenile" (ジュブナイル, Jubunairu). Crunchyroll streamed the series worldwide. Medialink licensed the series in Asia-Pacific and streams on Ani-One Asia YouTube channel.

No.	Title	Directed by (Note: Information is taken from the ending credits of each episode.)	Storyboarded by	Original release date (Note: Fuji TV lists the series premiere at 24:55 on January 11, 2023, which is effectively 12:55 a.m. JST on January 12.)
1	"The Boy from the Canopy"; Transliteration: "Tenmaku no Shōnen" (Japanese: 天膜の少年)	Taku Yonebayashi	Hiroaki Ando	January 12, 2023 (Note: This episode aired at 1:05 a.m. JST, 10 minutes after the original air time on Fuji TV.)
Kaina is a young man living on the Canopy, a massive organic membrane suspended high above the surface by Orbital Spire Trees. However, the Orbital Spire Trees have been slowly dying out along with the villages that rely on them for survival, with Kaina's own village believing they are the last remaining one on the Canopy. Kaina meanwhile wonders if humans have been able to survive on the Snow Sea on the surface of the planet. Meanwhile on the Snow Sea, Princess Ririha attempts to catch a Floater so she can go find the Sage, who she hopes can help save her country of Atland. Her group is then ambushed by a boat from the rival nation of Valghan. Her bodyguards sacrifice themselves to allow her to escape on the Floater, which travels all the way up to Canopy. Kaina happens to catch sight of Ririha while out hunting, and narrowly manages to rescue her before the Floater drifts away.
2	"Princess of the Snow Sea"; Transliteration: "Yuki Umi no Ojo" (Japanese: 雪海の王女)	Hiroaki Ando	Hiroyuki Shimazu	January 19, 2023 (Note: This episode aired at 1:10 a.m. JST, 15 minutes after the original air time on Fuji TV.)
Kaina takes Ririha back to his villages where she explains her situation. Her country of Atland is like many others on the Snow Sea, situated at the base of Orbital Spire Trees since those are the only locations with solid ground to settle on and collect water. However, like the Canopy, the Snow Sea is suffering from a severe water shortage, causing the militant country of Valghia to invade other countries to steal their water, Rirhia travelled to the Canopy in hopes of finding the Sage who is rumored to be able to create water, but is disappointed to learn he does not exist. The villagers task Kaina with guiding Ririha down to the Snow Sea, knowing that it is likely a one way trip. They also gift him salvaged climbing gear and a laser cutting tool to assist in the journey. Kaina and Ririha then begin their descent to the Snow Sea.
3	"Traveling Down the Orbital Tree"; Transliteration: "Kidōju no Tabi" (Japanese: 軌道樹の旅)	Taku Yonebayashi	Taku Yonebayashi	January 26, 2023
Kaina and Ririha continue their descent down the Snow Sea as forces from both Valghia and Atland search for Ririha. In the distance, a nearby Orbital Spire Tree collapses. As they travel, Kaina tells Ririha that his mother died during childbirth while his father died on a hunting trip. Ririha tells him that her mother died from illness when she was young, while her father rules Atland. Ririha also tells Kaina about the legend of the Sage, who created water when the planet was first settled by humans. However, after humans began to war with each other, the Sage withdrew to the Canopy and the Snow Sea formed afterwards. Ririha also reveals that she was informed about the existence of the Canopy thanks to Light, a strange, otherworldly entity that Kaina had also seen occasionally. After several days, the pair finally reach the bottom of the tree only to be met by a Valghian patrol. Seeing that Atland's cavalry has also arrived, Kaina and Ririha jump onto a nearby Floater to get over the Snow Sea and then leap into the sea.
4	"Conflict at the Snow Sea"; Transliteration: "Yoroi no Sen Hime" (Japanese: 鎧の戦姫)	Reiji Nagazono	Hiroyuki Shimazu	February 2, 2023
Kaina and Ririha leap into the Snow Sea, but the Valghians are able to capture them before the Atlandian cavalry led by Orinoga can reach them. Orinoga tries to rescue Ririha, but the Valghian officer leading the patrol proves to be too powerful for him to defeat, leading Ririha to order him to take Kaina to safety instead. Forced to follow Ririha's order, Orinoga leaves her behind and takes Kaina to Atland. Ririha's father is disheartened to hear of Ririha's capture, but refuses to authorize another rescue attempt due to the casualties Atland has suffered so far. Kaina is given a room to stay in, where he encounters Ririha's younger brother Yaona. Yaona reveals that their father does not intend to negotiate with Valghia and is preparing for war. He also informs Kaina that Ririha will most likely be brought to the negotiations taking place on a neighboring Spire Tree. Kaina gets the idea to use his air tanks to breathe underneath the Snow Sea and walk to the other Spire Tree through its interconnected root system with other trees. Yaona decides to come along and guides Kaina through a secret passage leading to the Snow Sea.
5	"Rescue Mission"; Transliteration: "Kyūshutsu Sakusen" (Japanese: 救出作戦)	Hiroaki Ando	Taku Yonebayashi	February 9, 2023
Kaina and Yaona make their way through abandoned ruins underneath Atland until they reach the Snow Sea, while Light secretly watches them. They then begin the long trek along the bottom of the Snow Sea, following the Spire Tree roots. Meanwhile, Ririha is brought to the negotiation point, where she meets the Valghian Admiral in charge of the negotiations. She bluffs and claims that she made contact with the Sage who promised to destroy Valghia if they attack Atland, but the Valghians are skeptical of her claims. As the Atland envoys head for the negotiation point, Kaina and Yaona attempt to pick up their pace by latching on to an undersea creature. However, they are thrown off and Kaina is knocked unconscious. The Atland envoys meet the Admiral and announce that Atland will not negotiate with Valghia, and the Admiral subsequently kills them. By the time Kaina regains consciousness, it is already dark, but he spots Ririha being held in a cage on the Admiral's flagship. He and Yaona decide to continue with the rescue mission while Light continues to secretly watch them.
6	"Ririha in a Cage"; Transliteration: "Kago no Naka no Ririha" (Japanese: 籠の中のリリハ)	Reiji Nagazono	Hiroyuki Shimazu	February 16, 2023
The Admiral has Ririha caged on the mast of his flagship, intending to force Atland to watch her freeze to death to break their morale. Kaina and Yaona are able to sneak aboard the flagship and manage to quietly free Ririha. They then hide out in the flagship's cargo hold, where Ririha deliberately sets a small boat loose to misdirect the Valghians into thinking they escaped by sea. The trio then hide in one of the cargo crates in the hold while the Valghians try to track down the boat. With Ririha gone, the Admiral grudgingly decides to return to Valghia. Once the flagship reaches Valgha, Kaina, Ririha, and Yaona are able to slip out and escape into the depths of the massive floating city.
7	"Fortress Nation"; Transliteration: "Yōsai no Kuni" (Japanese: 要塞の国)	Hiroaki Ando	Taku Yonebayashi	February 23, 2023
Kaina, Ririha, and Yaona explore Valghia, and see that most of the city is an impoverished slum where the citizens are struggling to survive amid water shortages. When they let their guard down, most of their belongings are stolen by a gang of children, including a young girl named Chiru who steals Ririha's necklace. Chiru attempts to trade the necklace for water, but the Valghian soldiers recognize it as Ririha's. The Admiral concocts a plan to publicly execute Chiru to draw Ririha out. Not wanting to have an innocent child die her place, Ririha reveals her presence. Chiru is released but when the Valghians attempt to capture Ririhia, she leaps into the Snow Sea below with Kaina read to pull her out. Chiru's gang, the Skull Brotherhood, then shelter Kaina and his friends in thanks for saving Chiru. Their leader Noze explains the Brotherhood is made up of children captured from nations destroyed by Valghia, and that Valghia once was a ship trying to rescue countries in peril as the Orbital Spire Trees began drying up. Kaina then recalls seeing a massive Orbital Spire Tree that appeared to still have water reserves while he lived up in the Canopy, and if it is found, Atland and Valghia would have no reason to go to war, especially since the Admiral commands a secret weapon that can destroy Atland. However, Valghian troops find the Brotherhood's hideout and begin breaking in.
8	"Lost at Sea"; Transliteration: "Hyōryū" (Japanese: 漂流)	Hiroaki Ando	Yasunori Ide	March 2, 2023
The Brotherhood reveal that they had secretly built a raft which Kaina and the others can use to escape. While the Brotherhood distracts the guards, Kaina, Ririha and Yaona escape Valghia on the raft, promising to find the Great Orbital Spire Tree. The trio sail through the night, and despite lacking the means to effectively navigate at night, they miraculously are able to find their way back to Atland in the morning. The Atlandians rejoice at the safe return of Ririha and Yaona, and Kaina is welcomed as a hero. However, the King refuses to believe their stories about the Great Orbital Spire Tree, believing it is just a myth. While taking a steam bath with Ririha, Kaina suddenly remembers that he recognized ancient writing in the ruins beneath Atland that resembled the symbols he had learned to read on the Canopy. Believing that a map to the Great Orbital Spire Tree is hidden in the ruins, Kaina and Ririha agree to go search for it to convince her father the tree really exists.
9	"Insignia of an Ancient Castle"; Transliteration: "Koōkyū no Hatajirushi" (Japanese: 古王宮の旗標)	Reiji Nagazono	Hiroyuki Shimazu	March 9, 2023
As Valghia continues to advance on Atland, Kaina, Ririha, and Yaona travel to the underground ruins to find the map. In Valghia, the Brotherhood begin spreading word about the existence of the Great Orbital Spire Tree, which begins to increase war weariness among the Valghian population. The Valghian fleet then begins their attack on Atland, with both sides trading artillery fire. Meanwhile, Kaina is able to decipher an ancient tapestry and discovers it is indeed a map to the Great Orbital Spire Tree, but the way to it is blocked by a massive oceanic trench that ships cannot cross. However, Ririha discovers a massive snowfoil stick that can be used to construct a ship capable of crossing the trench. On the surface, Orinoga leads his cavalry to invade Valghia from the rear, but the Admiral ignores him since he doesn't care about the civilians. General Amelothee takes it upon herself to intercept Orinoga while the Admiral activates his secret weapon, an ancient war machine called the Builder.
10	"The Builder"; Transliteration: "Kensetsusha" (Japanese: 建設者)	Hiroaki Ando	Hiroyuki Shimazu	March 16, 2023
The Builder begins to advance towards Atland, completely impervious to the defenders' attacks. Orinoga engages in a duel with Amelothee despite being outmatched. Kaina, Ririha, and Yaona reach the castle with the map, only to find out the king has moved to the frontline at the harbor. Kaina and Yaona are separated from Ririha when the Builder begins hurling artillery into the city, forcing Ririha to proceed alone. The Admiral catches sight of Ririha and begins focusing his attacks on her. Ririha wonders if Atland can prevail when Light intervenes, morphing into the legendary sea monster, the Ascender. However, the Admiral attacks the Ascender anyways and apparently destroys his, and he continues his assault on the city. As Yaona guides an injured civilian to safety, Kaina continues on to find Ririha. Meanwhile, Ririha continues to search for her father when she realizes the Builder is focusing solely on her.
11	"Scale of Hope"; Transliteration: "Kibō no Memori" (Japanese: 希望の目盛り)	Reiji Nagazono	Taku Yonebayashi; Hiroaki Ando	March 23, 2023
The Admiral continues his assault on Atland. However, his troops retreat in fear after witnessing him throwing one of their own ships at the city. The Valghian people then begin coming out to witness the battle, voicing their war weariness and discontent at the Valghian army. Realizing the Admiral has gone mad, Amelothee allows Orinoga to leave to take him down. In Atland, Ririha rescues a trapped civilian, but the map is destroyed by fire in the process. Even without the map, she heads to reunite with her father and saves him from an attack from the Builder. The Admiral then focuses on Ririha, but Kaina arrives and fires his laser cutter at full power, unleashing a massive laser beam that destroys the Builder. At the same time, Orinoga assassinates the Admiral. With the destruction of the Builder and the Admiral dead, Amelothee surrenders Valghia to Atland, but Ririha vouches for forming an alliance, instead. Kaina recreates the map from memory while Atland shares its water with Valghia. In return, Valgha uses its industry and technology to develop a reliable means to travel to the Canopy and make contact with Kaina's village, as well as build a new ship capable of reaching the Great Orbital Spire Tree.

=== Film ===
A sequel anime film was announced on January 7, 2023. Titled Kaina of the Great Snow Sea: Star Sage (大雪海のカイナ ほしのけんじゃ, Ōyukiumi no Kaina: Hoshi no Kenja), the film features the same staff and cast as the series, and premiered in Japanese theaters on October 13, 2023. An advance screening was shown during Anime Expo 2023 on July 2, 2023.

No.	Title	Directed by	Storyboarded by	Original release date
Film	"Kaina of the Great Snow Sea: Star Sage"	Hiroaki Ando	Hiroaki Ando; Hiroyuki Shimazu; Iwao Teraoka; Taku Yonebayashi	July 2, 2023 (Anime Expo premiere); October 13, 2023 (theatrical release)
The Atland and Valghia alliance builds a new ship capable of reaching the Great Orbital Spire Tree, and an expedition that includes Kaina, Ririha, Yaona, Orinoga, and Amelothee sets sail. They manage to brave the many dangers of the journey and successfully cross the oceanic snow trench. However, once they clear the trench, most of the crew is captured by a technologically advanced nation while Kaina and Ririha are left behind. The crew are taken to the city of Planetos, led by Byozan. Kaina and Ririha manage to reach Planetos as well, and are shocked to discover Amelothee and her Valghian crew have sworn allegiance to Byozan while the Atland crew were sent to join the laborer force. Ririha is captured and imprisoned while Kaina is sent to help the laborers excavate the "First Site" under the Great Orbital Spire tree. Both Ririha and Kaina learn that Byozan managed to recover the Sage's lost texts, and believes that the only way to eliminate the Snow Sea is to cut down the Great Orbital Spire Tree. In order to do that, he needs to recover the "Authorized User's Suit" from the First Site. They also learn that Light is the manifestation of the Great Orbital Spire Tree. Kaina is able to recover the Authorized User's Suit and activates an old control room. He learns that the Orbital Spire Trees are actually part of a terraforming system. However, the terraforming process can only be completed with a command from two authorized individuals. Byozan seizes the suit and orders an army of Builders to cut down the Great Orbital Spire Tree. Amelothee and Orinoga lead a rebellion against Byozan and subdue his security forces. Kaina uses his harpoon gun to destroy the suit, and together with Ririha recite the command to complete the terraforming process to Light. The Orbital Spire Trees then detach from the ground and float away into space, leaving behind large islands while the Snow Sea is transformed into a real sea. The rest of Atland and Valghia relocate to the island the Great Orbital Spire Tree used to stand on and begin building a new civilization while Kaina and Ririha marry each other.
