= Polygon Pictures =

Japanese animation studio

Polygon Pictures Inc.
- Native name: 株式会社ポリゴン・ピクチュアズ
- Romanized name: Kabushiki-gaisha Porigon Pikuchuazu
- Type: Kabushiki gaisha
- Industry: Japanese animation
- Founded: July 22, 1983; 43 years ago
- Founder: Toshifumi Kawahara
- Headquarters: Minami-Azabu, Minato, Tokyo, Japan
- Area served: Worldwide
- Key people: Shūzō John Shiota (Note: President and CEO.); Hideki Moriya (Note: Executive Vice-President.); Hiroshi Shimada; Youichi Ataka (Note: Director of Overseas Studios.); Nobuaki Hayashi (Note: Outside director.); Junnosuke Miyamoto; Yukio Ishizuka
- Products: Animated films, TV shows, commercials
- Parent: Polygon Pictures Holdings; King Records
- Subsidiaries: Polygon Pictures India; Polygon Pictures Malaysia
- Website: www.ppi.co.jp

Polygon Pictures Malaysia Sdn Bhd
- Formerly: Silver Ant PPI
- Type: Subsidiary (Kabushiki gaisha)
- Industry: Japanese animation
- Founded: January 2, 2013; 13 years ago (Note: As Silver Ant PPI.)
- Headquarters: Selangor, Malaysia
- Key people: Youichi Ataka (Note: President and CEO.); Shūzō John Shiota (Note: Board member.); Goh Aun Hoe
- Products: Animated films, TV shows, commercials
- Parent: Polygon Pictures
- Website: www.ppi-my.com

Polygon Pictures India Pvt. Ltd.
- Type: Subsidiary (Kabushiki gaisha)
- Industry: Japanese animation
- Founded: July 16, 2021; 5 years ago
- Headquarters: Thane, India
- Key people: Sandeep Sharad Betharia
- Products: Animated films, TV shows, commercials
- Parent: Polygon Pictures
- Website: www.ppi-india.com

Polygon Pictures, Inc. (Japanese: 株式会社ポリゴン・ピクチュアズ, Hepburn: Kabushiki-gaisha Porigon Pikuchuazu) is a Japanese 3DCG animation studio based in Minato, Tokyo. The company is known for its commercials and 3DCG work and also handles character licensing. Aside from that, the company has two international studios in Selangor, Malaysia and Thane, India. Rocky & Hopper serves as the studio's mascots.

== History ==
Polygon has animated a wide variety of content, from commercials for Shiseido featuring the studio's original penguin characters Rocky & Hopper (ロッキーとホッパー, Rokkī to Hoppā), to the 3D CG anime television series Digital Tokoro-san and the 3DCG anime film Samuroid Zero.

In 2004, PPI contributed the 3DCG parts for Production I.G's Mamoru Oshii-directed Innocence, the second feature anime film of the Ghost in the Shell universe, as well as his subsequent film, The Sky Crawlers.

In 2012, Hasbro's full-CG television series Transformers Prime, for which PPI created the animation, was awarded "Outstanding Special Class Animated Program" at the 30th Annual Daytime Emmy Awards.

Polygon Pictures also created the animation for the Disney XD series Tron: Uprising, as well as several episodes of the hit show Star Wars: The Clone Wars, broadcast on Cartoon Network. Each of these series received 4 nominations respectively at the 2013 Annie Awards, with Tron taking home awards for Character Design and Production Design.

In 2021, Polygon Pictures established an Indian subsidiary Polygon Pictures India in Thane, Maharashtra.

In 2023, Corus Entertainment announced that their subsidiary Nelvana would be working in partnership with Polygon Pictures to deliver Japanese original animated content for kids.

In 2024, Titmouse, Inc. announced a partnership with Polygon Pictures for multiple CG animated series.

=== Representative staff ===
==== Current ====
- Shūzō John Shiota (CEO, 2003~; former board member of Silver Ant PPI; board member of Polygon Pictures Malaysia and Polygon Pictures India)
- Hideki Moriya (Executive vice president, 2009~)
- Hiroshi Shimada (Executive vice president, 2025~; former board member, ?~2025)
- Youichi Ataka (Director of overseas studios; CEO of Polygon Pictures Malaysia, 2022~; CEO of Silver Ant PPI, 2013~2022)
- Sandeep Sharad Betharia (CEO of Polygon Pictures India, 2021~)
- Goh Aun Hoe (Board member of Polygon Pictures Malaysia; former board member of Silver Ant PPI)
- Nobuaki Hayashi (Outside director)
- Yukio Ishizuka (Outside director)
- Junnosuke Miyamoto (Outside director, 2025~)

==== Former ====
- Toshifumi "Toshi" Kawahara (Founder/CEO, 1983~1999)
- Taisuke Sasanuma (CEO, 1999~2003)
- Kiyoshi Murayama (Outside director, ?~2025)
- Akio Mishima (Outside director, ?~2025)
- Jack Liang (Head of international business developement, 2012~2026; board member of Silver Ant PPI (2018~2022), Polygon Pictures India (2021~2026), and Polygon Pictures Malaysia (2022~2026))

== Works ==
=== Television series ===
Year	Title	Director(s)	Source	Eps.	Refs.
2000–2001	Mr. Digital Tokoro	Masayuki Imayoshi	Original	12	
2001–2012	Genki Genki Nontan	Yutaka Kagawa	Children's book	36	
2014–2015	Knights of Sidonia	Kōbun Shizuno; Hiroyuki Seshita	Manga	24	
2014–2015	Ronja, the Robber's Daughter	Goro Miyazaki	Children's book	26	
2016	Ajin: Demi-Human	Hiroyuki Seshita; Hiroaki Andō	Manga	26	
2018	Fist of the Blue Sky: Regenesis	Yoshio Kazumi	Manga	24	
2020	Drifting Dragons	Tadahiro Yoshihira	Manga	12	
2022	Estab Life: Great Escape	Hiroyuki Hashimoto	Original	12	
2023	Kaina of the Great Snow Sea	Hiroaki Ando	Original	11	
2024	The Idolmaster Shiny Colors	Mankyū; Takeshi Iwata	Video game	24	
2026	Tank Chair	Tadahiro Yoshihira; Hiroaki Ando	Manga	11	
2027	Maiden Blood	Seiji Kishi	Original work	TBA	

==== Other productions ====
- Star Wars: The Clone Wars (2011–2013)
- Transformers Prime (2010–2013; animation)
- Tron: Uprising (2012–2013; animation)
- Transformers: Robots in Disguise (2015–2017; animation)
- Lost in Oz (2016–2018)
- Pingu in the City (2017–2019, with DandeLion Animation Studio)
- Star Wars Resistance (2018–2020; animation)
- Big Hero 6: The Series (2019; "Baymax and Mochi" shorts)
- Stillwater (2020–present; animation)
- Love, Death & Robots, Volume III - "The Very Pulse of the Machine" (2022)
- Your Friendly Neighborhood Spider-Man (2025–present; animation)

=== Films ===
Title	Director	Release date	Note(s)
Oblivion Island: Haruka and the Magic Mirror	Shinsuke Sato	August 22, 2009	
Knights of Sidonia: The Movie	Kōbun Shizuno	March 6, 2015	
Ajin Trilogy: Shōdō (2015); Shōtotsu (2016); Shōgeki (2016)	Hiroyuki Seshita; Hiroaki Andō	November 27, 2015; May 6, 2016; September 23, 2016	
Blame!	Hiroyuki Seshita	May 19, 2017	
Godzilla animated trilogy: Godzilla: Planet of the Monsters (2017); Godzilla: City on the Edge of Battle (2018); Godzilla: The Planet Eater (2018)	Kōbun Shizuno; Hiroyuki Seshita	November 17, 2017; May 18, 2018; November 9, 2018	
Human Lost	Fuminori Kizaki	November 29, 2019	
Knights of Sidonia: Love Woven in the Stars	Hiroyuki Seshita; Tadahiro Yoshihira	June 4, 2021	
Kaina of the Great Snow Sea: Star Sage	Hiroaki Ando	October 13, 2023	
Bloody Escape: Jigoku no Tousou Geki	Gorō Taniguchi	January 5, 2024	
Hypnosis Mic: Division Rap Battle	Takanori Tsujimoto	February 21, 2025	
Unanswered//butterfly: Sword Art Online	Tadahiro “Tady” Yoshihira	July 10, 2026	

=== ONAs ===
- Levius (2019)
- Drifting Dragons (2020)
- Transformers: War for Cybertron Trilogy (2020–2021, co-produced by Allspark Animation and Rooster Teeth)
- Pacific Rim: The Black (2021–2022; co-produced by Legendary Television)
- Mech Cadets (2023; co-produced by Boom! Studios)
- Star Wars: Visions - The Bird of Paradise (2025)

=== Ride films & shows ===
- Dark Chapel Tokyo Joypolis amusement park (2004)
- Expo 2005: Open Your Mind (2005)
- Galaxy Express 999 Epson Shinagawa Aqua Stadium (2005)
- DigitaReal Live Stage Tokyo Joypolis amusement park (2012 Projection mapping)
- Caretta Illumination 2012 "Lumière no Mori (Forest of Light)" Caretta Shiodome (2012 Projection mapping)

=== Games ===
- Super Power League (1993; box art)
- Super Power League 2 (1994; box art)
- Onimusha 2 (2002 Capcom video game)
- Winning Eleven Tactics (2003 Konami video game; opening video animation)
- Fatal Frame III: The Tormented (2005)
- Dead or Alive 4 (2006) (ending cinematics of Hayate and Erena)
- Dead or Alive Xtreme 2 (2006) (character introduction videos)
- Fighting Action Girl Cortina (2006)
- KOF: Maximum Impact 2 (2006)
- Street Fighter IV (2009 Capcom video game; opening video animation)
- Monster Farm Lagoon (2009)
- Resident Evil 5 (2009)
- Metroid: Other M (2010 Nintendo video game)
- Marvel vs. Capcom 3: Fate of Two Worlds (2010; trailer)
- Street Fighter X Tekken (2012 Capcom video game; opening video animation)
- Dino Dominion (2012-2014 COLOPL Android application game)
- Lollipop Chainsaw (2012 Kadokawa Games)
- Sacred 3 (2014 Deep Silver)
- Sengoku Kabuki Do (2013-2014 COLOPL Android application game)
- Thief (2014 Square Enix & Eidos-Montréal)
- Street Fighter V (2016 Capcom video game; character designs, background designs, opening movie, trailer movie, promotional video and character illustrations)
- Onmyoji (2018 NetEase video game; animated promotional video)
- Pokémon: Let's Go, Pikachu! and Let's Go, Eevee! (2018)
- Pokémon Sword and Shield (2019)
- Granblue Fantasy: Relink (2024)
- Screamer (2026)

=== Web ===
- Nissan X Dwarf: PLUG, OUR NeW WORLD (2011 "The Planet Zero" Movie Theater)

=== Short films ===
- In Search of Axis (1989-1991)
- Michael the Dinosaur (1993)
- Virtual Circus (1995)
- The Electric Circus (1996)
- The Robot Circus (1996)
- the FLY BanD! (1998) (for Information-technology Promotion Agency and exa)
- Aerobot (1998)
- Pole Network (1998)
- Junk Food King (1998)
- Polygon Family (1998) (for Information-technology Promotion Agency)
- Crocotires (1999) (for Information-technology Promotion Agency)
- Detective Pikachu and the Mystery of the Missing Flan (2023)

=== Commercials ===
- Sony (1990)
- Mainichi Broadcasting System (1992)
- NHK Hi-Vision (1992)
- Bigrill (1994)
- HG Super Hard (6 commercials; 1995–1997)
- Yamato Home Convenience (2 commercials; 2005)
- Wowow (2007)
- BS Fuji (2008)
- Kodansha (2016)
