= Keith Silverstein =

American voice actor

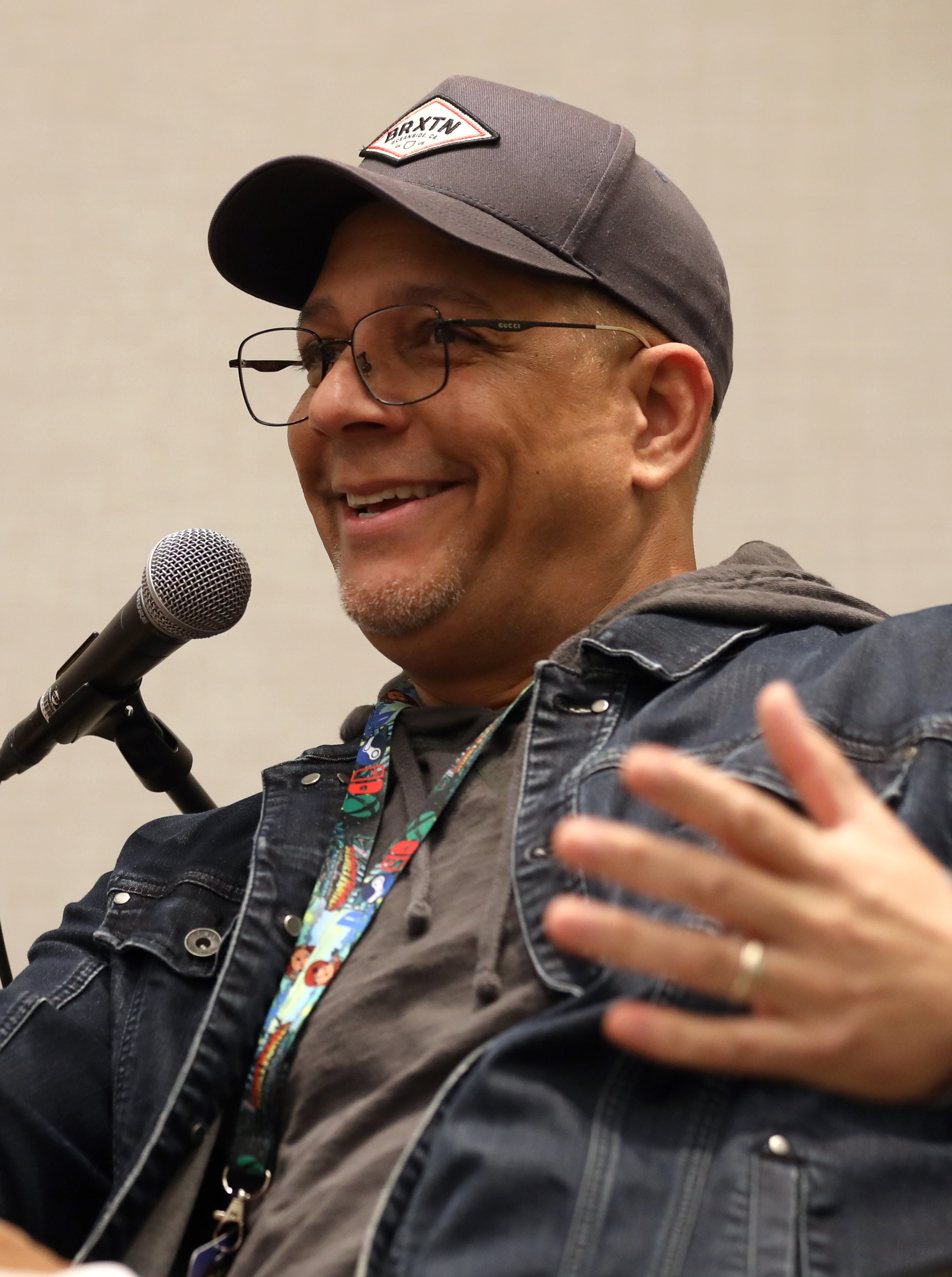
- Silverstein in 2024
- Other names: David Roach; Darin Bug; David Keefir
- Occupation: Voice actor
- Years active: 1999–present
- Agent: Dean Panero Talent
- Spouse: Rosemary Do (m. 2010)
- Children: 2
- Website: www.keithsilverstein.com

Keith Silverstein is an American voice actor, known for lending his voice to English versions of Japanese anime and video games. He is best known for his roles as Zasalamel in the Soulcalibur series, Hisoka in Hunter × Hunter, Zhongli in Genshin Impact, Gabriel Agreste a.k.a. Hawk Moth (Shadow Moth in season 4 and Monarch in season 5) and Betterfly in Miraculous: Tales of Ladybug & Cat Noir, Torbjörn Lindholm in Overwatch, Vector the Crocodile in the Sonic the Hedgehog video games, HUNK in the Resident Evil series, Robert E.O. Speedwagon in JoJo's Bizarre Adventure, Masamichi Yaga and Mechamaru in Jujutsu Kaisen, Coyote Starrk in Bleach, Kurozumi Orochi in One Piece, Ōgai Mori in Bungo Stray Dogs, Johan Liebert in Monster, and Epsilon in Pluto, Millennial Tree Cookie in Cookie Run: Kingdom, and Shido in Persona 5.

Keith Silverstein has also ventured into radio work, which includes doing the voices of FBI agent Peter Bourland and Santo in Focus on the Family's long-running Christian radio drama Adventures in Odyssey, George in I'll Be Home for Christmas, Carl in Sunday Chronicles, as well as multiple radio spots.

== Personal life ==
Silverstein has now been married to Rosemary Do since October 10, 2010. They have two daughters. Silverstein is Jewish.

== Filmography ==
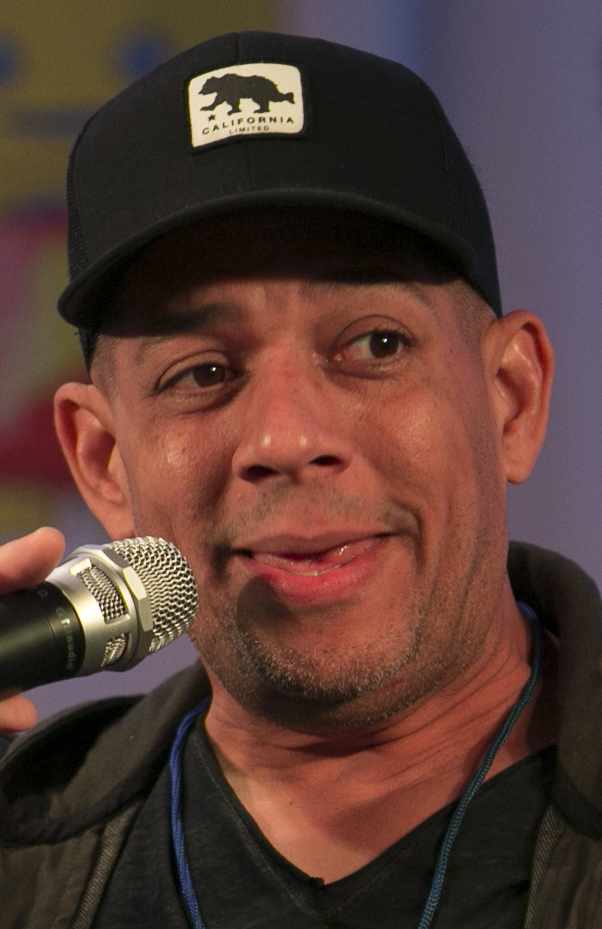
Silverstein in 2017

=== Anime ===
- 86 – Ernst Zimmerman
- Accel World – Red Rider (Previous Red King)
- A.I.C.O. -Incarnation- – Susumu Kurose
- Attack on Titan: The Final Season – Roeg
- B-Daman Crossfire – Smash Dragold
- B – The Beginning – Yellow
- Beastars – Gouhin
- Black Torch – Rago
- Blade of the Immortal – Manji
- Bleach – Coyote Starrk, Aaroniero Arruruerie (Top Skull), Mabashi, Tesra Lindocruz, Tensa Zangetsu
- Blood Lad – Heads Hydra
- Blue Dragon – Lemaire
- Blue Exorcist: Kyoto Saga – Yaozo Shima
- BNA: Brand New Animal – Gem Horner
- Boruto: Naruto Next Generations – Jigen / Isshiki Ōtsutsuki
- Bungo Stray Dogs – Ōgai Mori
- Buso Renkin – Masashi Daihama, Mita
- Cannon Busters – Seezar, Additional Voices
- Charlotte – Interpreter (Ep. 11)
- Code Geass – Kewell Soresi, Yoshitaka Minami
- Coppelion – Onihei Mishima
- Devilman Crybaby – Kukun
- Digimon Fusion – Apollomon Whispered
- Doraemon – Mr. S
- Dorohedoro – En
- Drifting Dragons – Gibbs
- Durarara!! – Tom Tanaka
- Eureka Seven – William B. Baxter
- Fate/Apocrypha – Caster of Red
- Glitter Force – Ulric, Brute, Rascal, various
- Ghost in the Shell: SAC 2045 – Standard
- Granblue Fantasy The Animation – Pommern
- Godzilla Singular Point – Gorō Ōtaki
- Gurren Lagann – Makken
- Haré+Guu – Robert
- Honey and Clover – Kazuo Aida, Kazushi Yamazaki, Luigi Fujiwara
- How a Realist Hero Rebuilt the Kingdom – Albert Elfrieden
- Hunter × Hunter 2011 series – Hisoka Morow
- In the Land of Leadale – Kartatz
- Japan Sinks: 2020 – Kōichirō Mutō
- Jujutsu Kaisen – Masamichi Yaga, Ultimate Mechamaru/Kokichi Muta
- JoJo's Bizarre Adventure – Robert E.O. Speedwagon
- K – Mikoto Suoh (Red King), Goki Zenjo
- Kannazuki no Miko – Yukihito
- Kekkaishi – Gagin, Mr. Kurosu, Ohdo (Ep. 4), Spy (Eps. 19 – 20), Takemitsu
- Kengan Ashura – Yohei Bando, Yamashita Kazuo
- Kimi ni Todoke – Kazuichi "Pin" Arai
- Kuroko's Basketball – Mitsuhiro Hayakawa, Kagetora Aida, Kentaro Seto
- Kuromukuro – Imusa, Girolamo Casiraghi
- Lagrange: The Flower of Rin-ne series – Villagulio
- Lost Song – Bazra Bearmors
- Lupin III: Jigen's Gravestone – Lupin
- Magi: The Labyrinth of Magic – Masrur, Goltas (Ep. 2–3, 6)
- Magic☆Hospital! – Dr. Ben Robinson
- Mahoromatic: I'm Home – Kiyomi Kawaguchi, Ryuga
- MÄR – Girom, Boss, Rolan, Danna Toramizu
- March Comes In like a Lion – Takashi Hayashida
- Mob Psycho 100 – Megumu Koyama
- Mobile Suit Gundam: Iron-Blooded Orphans – Chad Chadan
- Mobile Suit Gundam SEED DESTINY HD Remaster – Gilbert Durandal
- Mobile Suit Gundam: The Origin – Char Aznable
- Mobile Suit Gundam Unicorn – Full Frontal, Char Aznable
- Monster – Johan Liebert
- Naruto – Kimimaro, Gantetsu
- Naruto: Shippuden – Kimimaro, Yura, Ginkaku, Kusune (Ep. 184), Sukune (Ep. 187), Kyūsuke, Young Hagoromo Ōtsutsuki
- Nura: Rise of the Yokai Clan series – Zen, Nurarihyon (Young), Mokugyo Daruma, Inuhōō
- One Piece – Kurozumi Orochi
- One-Punch Man – Deep Sea King
- Paradise Kiss – Konishi, Noriji
- Phantom the Animation – Zwei (credited as David Keefir)
- Pluto – Epsilon
- Pokémon Evolutions – Professor Oak
- Pokémon: Twilight Wings – Chairman Rose
- The Prince of Tennis II: Hyotei vs. Rikkai Game of Future – Yushi Oshitari
- Rozen Maiden – Detective Kun-Kun
- Rozen Maiden: Träumend – Laplace's Demon, Shirosaki, Detective Kun-Kun
- Sailor Moon – Kenji Tsukino (Viz dub), Old Fortuneteller (Ep. 2), Yusuke (Ep. 6), Professor Tomoe (Viz dub)
- Sailor Moon Crystal – Kenji Tsukino, Professor Tomoe
- Samurai Champloo – Sunobi, Pinwheel Peddler
- Sand Land – Lucifer
- Saiyuki Reload Gunlock – Yakumo
- Sakamoto Days – Shishiba
- Shaman King – Mikihisa
- Skip Beat! – Takenori Sawara, Taisho (Ep. 2, 4)
- Stitch! – Gantu, Yuna's father
- Strait Jacket – Jack Roland
- Sword Art Online – Shozo Yuki (Asuna's Father, Ep. 15), Kagemune (Ep. 16, 20), G-Takusu (Ep. 19)
- Tenjho Tenge – Iwaki Kenjirou
- That Time I Got Reincarnated as a Slime – Damrada
- The Elusive Samurai – Ichikawa Sukefusa
- The Fragrant Flower Blooms with Dignity – Keiichiro Tsumugi
- The Ghost in the Shell – Ito
- The Seven Deadly Sins: Revival of The Commandments – Monspeet
- Tiger & Bunny – Cain Morris, B-Bomber
- Tokko – Akito
- Tokyo 24th Ward – Wataru Chikushi
- The Seven Deadly Sins: Revival of The Commandments – Monspeet
- Vinland Saga – Floki (Netflix dub)
- Violet Evergarden – Dietfried Bougainvillea
- Yashahime: Princess Half-Demon – Nanahoshi
- Your Lie in April – Kazama
- Zetman – Seiji Haitani
- The Asterisk War – Ar-D

=== Animation ===
- Amphibia – Barry
- The Bad Guys: A Very Bad Holiday – Gary, the Shaved Ice Vendor
- The Bad Guys: The Series – Gary the guard, Chaz, Kevin, and the Coffee Vendor
- Batgirl: Year One – Robin/Dick Grayson
- Fresh Beat Band of Spies – Commissioner Goldstar, Poulet, Additional Voices
- Miraculous Ladybug – Gabriel Agreste / Hawk Moth / Shadow Moth / Monarch; Prince Ali
- Little People – Baker Bob, Recycler Rick
- Monster High: Escape from Skull Shores – Bartleby Farnum
- Monsuno – Dax, Commander Trey
- NFL Rush Zone: Season of the Guardians – Giants Rusher, Cardinals Rusher, Steeler Stan, Hank the Guard
- The Predator Holiday Special – Santa Claus
- Rainbow Butterfly Unicorn Kitty – Town Crier, Various
- Sonic Boom – Vector the Crocodile
- Special Agent Oso – Faith's Dad
- Sesame Street – Ziggy the rapping Zebrasaurus
- Teenage Mutant Ninja Turtles – Kirby O'Neil
- Transformers: War for Cybertron Trilogy – Jetfire, Omega Supreme, Deseeus (Death)
- Tron: Uprising – Additional Voices
- Wakfu – Ruel Stroud (season 3)
- Zak Storm – Skullivar (credited as David Roach)

=== Films ===
- A Whisker Away – Cat Storekeeper
- Bleach: The DiamondDust Rebellion – Sōjirō Kusaka
- Bubble – Shin
- Case Closed: The Fist of Blue Sapphire – Shuichi Akai
- Child of Kamiari Month – Kotoshironushi, additional voices
- Godzilla: Planet of the Monsters – Unberto Mori
- Godzilla: City on the Edge of Battle – Unberto Mori
- Godzilla: The Planet Eater – Unberto Mori
- Hoodwinked Too! Hood vs. Evil – Additional Voices
- Hotel Transylvania 3 – Additional Voices
- The Jungle Bunch – Igor
- Jungle Master – Additional Voices
- Ladybug & Cat Noir: The Movie – Hawk Moth / Gabriel Agreste
- Tyler Perry's Madea's Tough Love – Helicopter Cop
- Mortal Kombat Legends: Snow Blind – Kabal
- My Hero Academia: Two Heroes – Wolfram
- Oblivion Island: Haruka and the Magic Mirror – Haruka's Father (credited as David Roach)
- One Piece Film: Gold – Gild Tesoro
- Penguin Highway – Aoyama's father
- Redline – JohnnyBoya
- Violet Evergarden: The Movie – Dietfried Bougainvillea

=== Live-action dubbing ===
- Azumi 2: Death or Love – Tsuchigamo
- Better than Us – Victor Toropov
- Masquerade – Park Choong-seo
- Violetta – Gregorio

=== Foreign show dubbing ===
List of English-language dubbings of foreign language shows
Year	Title	Country	Dubbed from	Role	Live Actor	Source
2016	Marseille	France	French	Cosini	Jean-René Privat	

=== Video games ===
List of voice performances in video games
Year	Title	Role	Notes	Source
2005	Soulcalibur III	Zasalamel	English dub Uncredited	
2005	Riviera: The Promised Land	Hector, Reichen		
2007	Resident Evil: The Umbrella Chronicles	Hunk		
2008	Soulcalibur IV	Zasalamel		
2008	Tales of Vesperia	Adecor, Efreet, Phaeroh, additional voices		
2008	Castlevania: Order of Ecclesia	Albus		
2008	Castlevania Judgment	Simon Belmont	English dub Uncredited	
2009	Cross Edge	Lazarus		
2009	Soulcalibur: Broken Destiny	Zasalamel		
2009	Bleach: The 3rd Phantom	Sōjirō Kusaka	English dub	
2009	Shin Megami Tensei: Persona	Hidehiko "Brown" Uesugi	English dub	
2009	League of Legends	Shen		
2009	Mana Khemia 2: Fall of Alchemy	Eugene, Light Mana		
2009	Resident Evil: The Darkside Chronicles	Hunk		
2010	Love Dance Seed	Sid Le Creuset	English dub	
2010	Final Fantasy XIII	Cocoon Inhabitants	English dub	
2010	Hexyz Force	Levant von Schweitzer	English dub	
2010	Trinity Universe	Recit		
2010	StarCraft II: Wings of Liberty	Marcus Cade		
2010	Sengoku Basara: Samurai Heroes	Additional voices (warriors)		
2010–present	Sonic the Hedgehog series	Vector the Crocodile	Sometimes credited as David Keeter	
2011	Dynasty Warriors 7	Zhuge Dan	English dub Uncredited	
2011	Resident Evil: The Mercenaries 3D	Hunk	English dub Uncredited	
2011	Bleach: Soul Resurrección	Coyote Starrk	English dub	
2011	Persona 2: Innocent Sin	Tatsuya Suou	English dub	
2011	Skylanders: Spyro's Adventure	Bash, Dino-Rang, T-Bone		
2011	The Elder Scrolls V: Skyrim	Nazeem, Savos Aren, Additional voices		
2011	Dynasty Warriors 7: Xtreme Legends	Zhuge Dan, Pang De	English dub Uncredited	
2012	Asura's Wrath	Emperor Strada	English dub	
2012	Binary Domain	Additional voices	English dub	
2012	Street Fighter X Tekken	Bryan Fury	English dub Credited as David Keefir	
2012	Tales of Graces f	Lambda	English dub	
2012	Resident Evil: Operation Raccoon City	Hunk	English dub	
2012	Dragon's Dogma	Pawn		
2012	Transformers: Fall of Cybertron	Blast Off, Rumble		
2012	Dead or Alive 5	Zack		
2012	Skylanders: Giants	Bash, Dino-Rang, T-Bone		
2012	LittleBigPlanet Karting	Don Doubtworthy, Additional voices	Credited as David Keefir	
2013	Shin Megami Tensei IV	Flynn	English dub	
2013	Tales of Xillia	Cline K. Sharil	English dub	
2013	Armored Core: Verdict Day	Various pilots		
2013	Skylanders: Swap Force	Bash, Dino-Rang		
2013	Pac-Man and the Ghostly Adventures	Fuzbitz		
2013	MapleStory	Will, Havoc, Limbo, Albaire, Mu Gong, Khalid, Sharen III	English dub	
2014	Danganronpa: Trigger Happy Havoc	Mondo Owada, Jin Kirigiri	English dub Uncredited	
2014	Conception II: Children of the Seven Stars	Mattero	English dub	
2014	Persona Q: Shadow of the Labyrinth	Zen	English dub	
2014	Transformers: Rise of the Dark Spark	Blast Off, Rumble, Insecticon Swarmer Grunt		
2014	Skylanders: Trap Team	Bash, Dino-Rang, Bop		
2015	Batman: Arkham Knight	Lex Luthor		
2015	Skylanders: SuperChargers	Bash, Dino-Rang, Bop		
2015	Call of Duty: Black Ops III	Experimental War Robot 115 Reaper		
2015	Stella Glow	Dante	English dub Uncredited	
2015	Xenoblade Chronicles X	Male Avatar (Rebel)		
2016	Street Fighter V	Mahes, Gouken, Shadaloo Soldier, Nguuhao Lieutenant B	English dub	
2016	Overwatch	Torbjörn		
2016	Star Ocean: Integrity and Faithlessness	Eitalon's Leader		
2016	Zero Time Dilemma	Eric		
2016	Shin Megami Tensei IV: Apocalypse	Flynn		
2016	Skylanders: Imaginators	Bash, Dino-Rang, Bop	Uncredited	
2017	Nier: Automata	Additional voices	Credited as David Keefir	
2017	Club Penguin Island	Rockhopper		
2017	Persona 5	Masayoshi Shido	English dub	
2017	Fire Emblem Echoes: Shadows of Valentia	Saber	English dub Uncredited	
2017	Fire Emblem Heroes	Saber	English dub	
2017	Demon Gaze II	Additional voices		
2018	Monster Hunter: World	Seeker	English dub	
2018	BlazBlue: Cross Tag Battle	Waldstein	English dub Uncredited	
2018	Octopath Traveler	Additional voices	Credited as David Roach	
2018–2019	The Walking Dead: The Final Season	Omar, Yonatan, Michael		
2018	Valkyria Chronicles 4	Dan Bentley		
2018	Mega Man 11	Dr. Wily	English dub	
2018	Soulcalibur VI	Zasalamel		
2018	Spider-Man	Hammerhead	"The Heist" and "Turf Wars" DLC	
2018	Super Smash Bros. Ultimate	Simon Belmont	English dub	
2019	Resident Evil 2	Hunk, Additional voices	English dub	
2019	Kingdom Hearts III	Additional voices	English dub	
2019	Dead or Alive 6	Zack	English dub	
2019	Legends of Runeterra	Shen		
2019	Judgment	Satoshi Shioya	English dub	
2019	Fire Emblem: Three Houses	Additional voices	English dub	
2019	Daemon X Machina	Gargantua		
2019	Code Vein	Juzo Mido	English dub	
2020	One-Punch Man: A Hero Nobody Knows	Deep Sea King	English dub	
2020	Doom Eternal	Deag Nilox, Deag Grav		
2020	Persona 5 Royal	Masayoshi Shido	English dub	
2020	Genshin Impact	Zhongli	English dub	
2020	G.I. Joe: Operation Blackout	Cobra Commander, Back-Stop		
2020	Call of Duty: Black Ops Cold War	Additional Voices		
2020	Yakuza: Like a Dragon	Additional Voices	English dub	
2020	Sakuna: Of Rice and Ruin	Yomotsu Homutsubi		
2021	Cookie Run: Kingdom	Millennial Tree Cookie		
2021	Re:Zero − Starting Life in Another World: The Prophecy of the Throne	Aldebaran, Rickert	English dub	
2021	Nier Replicant ver.1.22474487139...	Additional voices	English dub	
2021	Shin Megami Tensei III: Nocturne HD Remaster	Additional voices	English dub	
2021	Lost Judgment	Bar Siren Owner	English dub	
2021	Shin Megami Tensei V	Odin, Loup-garou	English dub	
2022	Chocobo GP	Cid		
2022	Relayer	Grayson Order, additional voices	English dub	
2022	AI: The Somnium Files – Nirvana Initiative	Riichi Chieda	English dub	
2022	Fire Emblem Warriors: Three Hopes	Additional voices	English dub	
2022	Monster Hunter Rise: Sunbreak	Master Arlow	English dub	
2022	Star Ocean: The Divine Force	Midas Felgreed	English dub	
2022	Tactics Ogre: Reborn	Nybeth Obdilord	English dub	
2023	Octopath Traveler II	Papp	English dub	
2023	Mato Anomalies	Ah Tsai, Gangster, Kid B	English dub	In-game credits
2023	Trinity Trigger	King Balt	English dub	
2023	Street Fighter 6	Dhalsim	English dub	
2023	Anonymous;Code	Tengen Ozutani	English dub	
2024	Like a Dragon: Infinite Wealth	Additional voices	English dub	
2024	Granblue Fantasy: Relink	Additional voices	English dub	
2024	Unicorn Overlord	Bradley	English dub	
2024	Sand Land	Lucifer		
2024	The Legend of Heroes: Trails Through Daybreak	Walter Kron, citizens		
2025	The Legend of Heroes: Trails Through Daybreak II	Walter Kron, citizens		
2025	Like a Dragon: Pirate Yakuza in Hawaii	Additional voices		
2025	Xenoblade Chronicles X: Definitive Edition	Male Avatar (Rebel), additional voices		
2025	Lunar Remastered Collection	Ghaleon, Myght, Mel	English dub	In-game credits
2025	Rune Factory: Guardians of Azuma	Additional voices		
2025	Yakuza 0 Director's Cut	Kazuo Shibata		
2025	Raidou Remastered: The Mystery of the Soulless Army	Village head		
2025	Story of Seasons: Grand Bazaar	Stuart		
2025	Pac-Man World 2 Re-Pac	Pac-Ranger		
2025	Fatal Fury: City of the Wolves	Announcer (English voice)		
2025	Towa and the Guardians of the Sacred Tree	Futo		
2025	Digimon Story: Time Stranger	Additional voices		
2025	Call of Duty: Black Ops 7	Experimental War Robot-3 Reaper		
2026	Trails in the Sky 2nd Chapter	Walter Kron	English dub	
2026	Resident Evil Requiem	Commander		
2026	Halo: Campaign Evolved	Captain Jacob Keyes	Taking over for original voice actor Pete Stacker	

=== Web series ===
- Timber Wolf – Loopy T. Wolf, Igor Beaver, Dash Snake, Termite
- Pencil and Parsecs – K'lev

=== Audio Drama ===
List of voice performances in audio dramas
Year	Title	Role	Notes	Source
2026	Sonic the Hedgehog Presents: The Chaotix Casefiles	Vector the Crocodile	Main Role	
2026	Halo: The Fall of Reach (Full-Cast Dramatized Adaptation)	Captain Jacob Keyes		
