= List of Honey and Clover episodes =

First DVD cover of the anime series

The anime television series Honey and Clover is based on the manga of the same name by Chika Umino. The series depicts the lives and relationships of five students at a Tokyo art college, four of whom live in the same apartment building. The television series was produced by J.C.Staff and consists of 36 episodes broadcast in two seasons on Fuji TV in the Noitamina programming block. The first season was directed by Ken'ichi Kasai, and consisted of 24 episodes that aired from April 14, 2005, to September 29, 2005, plus two OVA episodes released on volumes 5 and 7 of the DVDs. The second season was directed by Tatsuyuki Nagai, and consisted of 12 episodes that aired between June 29, 2006, to September 14, 2006.

Both seasons were rebroadcast in Japan by the anime CS television network Animax, which also later broadcast the series across its respective networks in Hong Kong, Taiwan, South Korea, and other regions. The series was first broadcast in English on Amimax's Southeast Asia network starting August 1, 2006.

Most episodes titles are a quote or paraphrase from the episode's dialogue. The preview teaser before the episode often adds a second "title". In the following list, the title listed on the official website is listed first, followed by the title given in the teaser, if available.

== Episode list ==
=== Honey and Clover (2005) ===
No.	Title	Original release date
1	"... ...I just saw the moment when a person falls in love for the first time. Oh boy... ..."; Transliteration: "... ...Hito ga koi ni ochiru shunkan o hajimete mite shimatta. Maitta na... ..." (Japanese: ... ...人が恋に落ちる瞬間を初めて見てしまった.まいったな... ...)	April 14, 2005
Yūta Takemoto, a second-year student at an art school, desperate tries to wake up sixth-year student, Shinobu Morita, for school, in order to prevent Morita from repeating yet another school year. Later on, Takemoto and Takumi Mayama, a fourth-year student, are introduced to Hagumi "Hagu" Hanamoto by Shūji Hanamoto, her father's cousin. However, Morita also meets Hagu, causing him to constantly take pictures of her.
2	"I panicked a little when I saw Hagu-chan... ...hey, wait / The two affections start to turn" Transliteration: "Hagu-chan o mite sukoshi, asetta... ...tteiuka / Futatsu no koi ga mawaridasu" (Japanese: はぐちゃんを見て少し、焦った... ...っていうか / 2つの恋が回り出す)	April 21, 2005
Takemoto and Mayama soon discover Hagu's artistic talents. They, as well as Hagu, discover Morita's website which contains a collection of pictures featuring Hagu. Hagu gets upset and throws random objects at Morita, which included her wish list. Meanwhile, Takemoto plans to throw a teppanyaki party. Later, after his job, Morita spots one of the items from Hagu's list, a pair of patent pink mules, in a store and buys it as a present for Hagu. Morita arrives back in a drowsy state and gives two bags of meat for Takemoto's party, as well as the mules for Hagu. Hagu is delighted and Morita faints from exhaustion from his job. Takemoto offers to carry him home and suddenly notices his feelings towards Hagu on the way back.
3	"Hey. Why me? / These were two unrequited loves" Transliteration: "Ano sa, omae. Nande ore nanda? / Sore wa futatsu no kataomoi" (Japanese: あのさ、お前.なんで俺なんだ? / それは2つの片思い)	April 28, 2005
It is late summer. Takemoto, Mayama, and Morita are coming back from an evening bath when Takemoto receives a phone call from Hagu inviting them all over for dinner the next evening. Mayama and Morita decide not to go, leaving Takemoto to have dinner with Hagu and Professor Hanamoto. Meanwhile, Mayama has developed feelings for Rika Harada, an older woman who is good friends with Professor Hanamoto and is also Mayama's boss. Ayumi Yamada, a friend of Mayama who has a crush on him, finds out about this and publicly chastises him for it. Later, Yamada approaches Mayama and asks why he works for Rika without mentioning his feelings for Rika. However, Mayama coldly tells Yamada she should find another guy. Yamada is deeply hurt and cries about it to Morita.
4	"Actually, I don't like Christmas all that much... ... / The boy and girl are swayed" Transliteration: "Honto wa anma suki janai. Christmas... ... / Kare to kanojo ga yureugoku" (Japanese: ホントはあんま好きじゃない.クリスマス... ... / 彼と彼女が揺れ動く)	May 5, 2005
Mayama continues to battle over his feelings for Rika and his feelings for Yamada. Meanwhile, Hagu is overwhelmed by other people's expectations of her artistic ability. The next day, Morita invites Takemoto, Mayama, Hagu, Professor Hanamoto, and Yamada to a Christmas party. Takemoto and Hagu go Christmas shopping, and Takemoto does not really like Christmas. Mayama visits Rika and learns she is going out with Professor Hanamoto. The night of the Christmas party comes, and everyone has a good time. Mayama arrives late, and the party has become a little crazy. Mayama steps out to meet Professor Hanamoto, and asks where Rika is. Professor Hanamoto replies she is at her husband's, meaning Rika is visiting the grave of her husband. Hagu interrupts their conversation, and Mayama and Professor Hanamoto join the party. At the end of the party, Mayama stays to clean up, and Professor Hanamoto takes everyone else home. Mayama stands by the window and thinks wistfully of Rika, and then Yamada. Morita startles Mayama out of his reverie, and the two drink. Takemoto is asleep, dreaming of a happy Christmas with himself and Hagu.
5	"Yeah... ... ...I'm home... ... / Thinking of mother back home" Transliteration: "Un... ... ...Tadaima... ... / Kokyō no haha o omou" (Japanese: うん... ... ...ただいま... ... / 故郷の母を想う)	May 12, 2005
Takemoto goes home to visit Mitsuko Aida, his mother, for the first time in a while. Takemoto's father died many years ago, and Takemoto does not like Kazuo Aida, his mother's love interest. While visiting, Takemoto realizes Kazuo is not a replacement for his father, but someone who cares for Mitsuko. He finds a respect for Kazuo. Later, Professor Hanamoto takes Takemoto, Hagu, Morita, and Yamada on a trip. Mayama is invited as well but comes later.
6	"... ...Hey, Yamada, how come you fell in love with a guy like me? / The past, the tears, the confession" Transliteration: "... ...Naa Yamada, nande ore nanka suki ni natchimattandayo / Kako to namida to kokuhaku to" (Japanese: ... ...なあ山田、なんで俺なんか好きになっちまったんだよ / 過去と涙と告白と)	May 19, 2005
Takemoto, Hagu, Morita, Mayama, Yamada, and Professor Hanamoto go to the zoo. Professor Hanamoto talks to Mayama and tells him about Rika's husband. Professor Hanamoto lived with Rika and her husband, and he was very close to both of them. When Rika's husband died in an accident, Professor Hanamoto took care of Rika, since she suffered major injuries in the accident. Professor Hanamoto tells Mayama Rika is hiring his replacement. This is because Rika believes Mayama will get the job he applied. But it is also because she has feelings for him, and it is too painful to have him around her. Later, Yamada decides to stay at the school as a graduate student. Mayama is notified he has received a job offer at the place he applied to. Takemoto, Hagu, Morita, Mayama, Yamada, and Professor Hanamoto have a party to celebrate. Mayama carries a drunken Yamada home on his back and tells her he thought she would leave if he turned her down. Yamada begins crying and tells him she loves him.
7	"Hagu, let's go together / We look for a miracle" Transliteration: "Hagu, issho ni ikō / Bokutachi wa kiseki o sagasu" (Japanese: はぐ、一緒に行こう / 僕たちは奇跡を探す)	May 26, 2005
Professor Hanamoto is offered to travel with his former teacher for one year to gather research and survey material for a new book, and offers to bring Hagu along for the trip. Hagu refuses, stating she won't be lonely because she now has friends, which is a stark contrast to Professor Hanamoto's recollection of Hagu's life prior to coming to the art school. Meanwhile, Mayama bids Rika farewell when she learns he has been hired and started working at the Fujiwara Design Office, promising he would return some day. Before Professor Hanamoto's farewell party, Hagu tries to find a four-leaf clover to give Professor Hanamoto as a good luck charm, to which everyone coincidentally passes by and helps out to find. Ultimately, they are unsuccessful, although Professor Hanamoto's appreciates the effort and Takemoto cherishes the memory of the day.
8	"Yeah... ...that's far... ... / I couldn't leave you alone" Transliteration: "Aa... ...tōinā... ... / Kimi o hōtte okenakute" (Japanese: ああ... ...遠いなぁ... ... / 君を放っておけなくて)	June 2, 2005
Yamada has moved in with Hagu, and the two invite Takemoto, Morita, and Mayama over for a strange dinner. It's shown to humorous effect Hagu and Professor Hanamoto greatly miss each other. After dinner, Mayama asks why they are gathered together, and no one seems to know. Takemoto replies it's his birthday, and everyone is very embarrassed. They all attempt to make up for it. Morita makes a Twister mat and cards with too many colors, and he and Takemoto become hopelessly entangled in it. Morita makes a joke about Mayama's stalking, and Mayama leaves. Yamada sees him off. After Mayama has left, Yamada looks up at the sky and wonders how to give up on Mayama, and whether it's worth it. Mayama, meanwhile, sits and stares at Rika's window. The next day, Yamada has to leave Hagu alone in the apartment for a night. Takemoto remembers he made it through his first night alone because of his friends, so he goes to visit Hagu. The two sit and talk late into the night.
9	"Did she notice? Why is it that I don't tell her? / That brooch was so heavy" Transliteration: "Kanojo wa kizuita darōka? Naze ore wa oshienaindarōka? / Sono burōchi ga omotakute" (Japanese: 彼女は気付いただろうか? なぜオレは教えないんだろうか? / そのブローチが重たくて)	June 9, 2005
Morita makes and discreetly gives Hagu a brooch she wanted, while Takemoto fights feelings of jealousy and whether or not to tell Hagu who gave the brooch to her. Yamada also thanks Morita for bailing her out of a situation where she awkwardly tried to casually say she loves Mayama. Christmas arrives, and Hagu begins her first part-time job by helping Yamada in the local shopping district. Takemoto is asked to help with decorations when Hagu and the shopping district try to win back business from a competing supermarket chain. Takemoto has a change of heart over how he feels about Christmas. He also attempts to tell Hagu about the brooch during the ensuing Christmas party, but is interrupted by Morita who tells Hagu herself there's no deep meaning to it.
10	"... ...It's not something you can just throw away that easily, is it? ... ... / We cross the sky" Transliteration: "... ...Sonna kantan ni hōri dashitemo iimon janaidaro... ... / Bokutachi wa sora o yokogiru" (Japanese: ... ...そんな簡単に放り出していいもんじゃないだろ... ... / 僕たちは空を横切る)	June 23, 2005
After the school festival and Christmas passes, the entire group goes on an outing by going on a water taxi ride along the Sumida River, where Mayama reveals to Takemoto he knows about Takemoto's feelings toward Hagu and tells him to not give up. Their day continues when they arrive at the Kasai Seaside Park, only to find it largely deserted due to the winter season. They ride the Ferris wheel there, but end up in awkward seating arrangements due to Morita's antics. On the water taxi ride back, Takemoto ponders about the group's situation and how the new year will be like.
11	"That... ...wasn't fun at all... ... / Love pushes us around" Transliteration: "Ta... ...Tanoshiku nakatta... ... / Koi ni furimawasarete" (Japanese: た... ...楽しくなかった... ... / 恋に振り回されて)	June 30, 2005
Takemoto and Yamada talk about Mayama's future and how Hagu has grown before they are interrupted by Professor Hanamoto's sudden and early return from his trip to Mongolia. Everyone gathers at night to hear about Professor Hanamoto and his teacher's trip. The next day, Hagu goes out shopping with Morita for art supplies due to everyone else being busy. Hagu wrestles with her feelings for Morita as he treats her coldly the entire day. Eventually, Hagu returns and cries to Professor Hanamoto, nearly regressing to the past where she only trusts Professor Hanamoto.
12	"You idiot, what are you thinking?! / The sudden kiss, the unexpected parting" Transliteration: "Bakkayarō, nani kangaetendayo! / Totsuzen no kisu, tōtotsu na wakare" (Japanese: バッカヤロウ.何考えてんだよ! / 突然のキス、唐突な別れ)	July 7, 2005
It is spring again. The whole group attend the annual school festival. Some of them tell stories about what happened recently to them, while others think of their loved ones. Later the next day, Hagu is still in an uncomfortable mood. She went out to buy tobacco for Professor Hanamoto and took a look of cherry blossoms for a while. Morita suddenly appears in his eccentric behavior, giving her his scarf and kissing her unconsciously. He ran away the moment he realized what he had just done. Hagu was quite shocked afterwards and she got a fever which according to Professor Hanamoto, is often caused to by stress. Professor Hanamoto told Takemoto about Hagu's uncomfortable feelings while going out with Morita last time, and he said she did not realize it was because she liked him. Takemoto, feeling depressed, comes back home, finding the person responsible for summoning Morita to work, who is seen breaking into Morita's overly secured room. The room shockingly resembled a master control room. This mysterious person then finds Morita's passport, in order to be delivered to the airport. He tells Takemoto Morita is about to go to Los Angeles for six months for a job. Takemoto jumps into the car with him to go to airport, but he could not make it in time to bid Morita farewell. The person is Morita's older brother, Kaoru Morita, who is also eccentric as he is. Takemoto asks Kaoru whether Morita will return or not. In turn, Kaoru asks Takemoto whether or not he wants Morita to return.
L	"We're face-to-face with a legend... ... / Rōmaiya-senpai SPECIAL is this sort of story" Transliteration: "Bokutachi wa, densetsu to mukiau... ... / Rōmaiya-senpai SPECIAL wa konna ohanashi" (Japanese: 僕たちは、伝説と向き合う... ... / ローマイヤ先輩SPECIALはこんなお話)	Unaired
Takemoto, Morita, Mayama, and Professor Hanamoto reminisce about Lohmeyer, a friend of theirs. In a flashback, he is a large, bulky guy, and known for his generosity and his kindness. He brings tons of meat for them, as the four happily ask for more. Until one day, Lohmeyer disappears, leaving the four in major depression and sorrow. In the present, Takemoto and Mayama go to an amusement park. Mayama explains the history and design of the amusement park as well as its mascot, leaving Takemoto in total shock. The suit of the mascot, ironically, was worn by Lohmeyer at the time. Mayama says Lohmeyer was the mascot who attracted many more adults more than the children because of his personality. Takemoto then wonders about Lohmeyer as the mascot of the amusement park. However, Takemoto, Hagu, Mayama, and Yamada are surprised to discover Morita is the new wearer of the suit of the mascot.
13	"... ...What was I expecting her to say? / All I wanted to hear was that little thing" Transliteration: "... ...Kanojo ni ... ...Boku wa ittai, donna kotae o kitai shite itandarō / Sono, tatta hitokoto ga kikitakute" (Japanese: ... ...彼女に... ...僕はいったい、どんな答えを期待していたんだろう / その、たった一言がききたくて)	July 14, 2005
Takemoto later announces the news about Morita leaving for Los Angeles to Hagu and the rest. Later, they all went to Morita's room, since the door was destroyed by Kaoru. Takemoto asked Hagu whether or not she wants Morita to return, but her stern and straightforward answer before was really hurting him. The story mainly talked about Yamada and her feelings later on. To save money, Mayama asked Yamada to help making some artwork for his firm's project. Takemoto, seeing Hagu all fired up creating her latest work, reminded him of Morita's dedication in his work. Yamada invites Hagu along with the gang to the fireworks display taking place in the evening. Both Hagu and Yamada choose to wear their yukatas for the event. Later the evening, Yamada, being conscious of her looks, wanted Mayama to compliment her on her yukata.
14	"I met with her in my dream... ... / I touched her in my dream" Transliteration: "Yume no naka de, kanojo ni atta... ... / Yume no naka de, kanojo ni fureta" (Japanese: 夢の中で、彼女に逢った... ... / 夢の中で、彼女に触れた)	July 21, 2005
Mayama dreams of Rika. One co-worker, Miwako Teshigawara, says when one dreams of another, it is because the person in the dream wants them to meet so much their soul escapes the body and comes into the dream. Mayama was in doubt about it, but on the way back home from a meeting, he and his other co-workers, Takumi Nomiya and Kazushi Yamazaki, passed by a park where Rika was just behind a fountain watching him passing by. Mayama didn't notice until later. However, when he ran back to the fountain, she was not there anymore. Later, everyone at Mayama's workplace began talking about Rika's deceased husband, seemingly making Mayama realize he was the only one who did not know Rika's husband personally. Nomiya mentions Yamada, implying he wants to meet her. Mayama then leaves the office, only to go to the festival with Takemoto, Hagu, Yamada, and Professor Hanamoto. He was followed later by Nomiya, Yamazaki, and Miwako, much to his chagrin.
15	"... ...Rika-san. Is it possible that Harada Design might still have work for me? / An unfair me begins to run" Transliteration: "... ...Rika-san. Ore o mata Harada Dezain de tsukatte moraemasuka? / Hikyō na boku ga, hashiridasu" (Japanese: ... ...理花さん.オレをまた原田デザインで使ってもらえますか? / 卑怯な僕が、走り出す)	July 28, 2005
Mayama's work is going well with his co-workers. Miwako noticed how well Mayama and Nomiya potted bowls. But this leads to Mayama discussing to his co-workers about his feelings toward Yamada. Yet he still misses Rika. Mayama and Nomiya head over to Yamada's room, after they had finished their work for the day. They start gathering Yamada's pottery to display at an art exhibition. However, Miwako calls Mayama to urgently come back to the office, concerning a scale model for a meeting the next day, as it has been accidentally broken. After noticing Mayama left his coat at her place, Yamada reminisces with her time with Mayama. Nomiya comes in, as Yamada is in deep thought, which, in turn, startles her. Nomiya takes Yamada out in the evening to eat. Furious, Mayama develops jealousy, as he finds out Nomiya went out with her last night. Yet Yamada becomes frustrated for his jealousy. Mayama converses with Professor Hanamoto about Rika, but Mayama ends up walking back home, disappointed. He starts to reminisce about Rika again, when he gets a call from Asai, Rika's current assistant, has a health emergency and needs to stay in the hospital. Mayama meets Asai in the hospital, and he finds out Rika is also in the hospital. He asks her if he can come back to him, but she rejects him. However, Mayama reluctantly offers her a ride home.
16	"The third answer doesn't even reach my lips... ... / The moon is calling her" Transliteration: "Mittsume no kotae o, boku wa, kuchi ni shinai... ... / Tsuki ga kanojo o yonde iru" (Japanese: 3つめの答えを、僕は、口にしない... ... / 月が彼女を呼んでいる)	August 4, 2005
Nomiya tells Miwako the firm will be splitting into two locations. One will stay in Tokyo, while the other will move to Tottori. Nomiya intentionally wants Mayama to go to the firm in Tottori. At the same time, Asai is still in the hospital and Rika hasn't been able to find a replacement for him. Hence, Mayama decides to leave the firm and comes back to work with Rika at the Harada Design Office, without much of asking for her permission. Yamada was acknowledged about this two weeks later through Nomiya, resulting in her depression. Later on, Yamada tells the others four guys, who were childhood friends of hers, proposed to her at a shopping district, but she chose to run away from them. Professor Hanamoto later on explained to Yamada her situation with Mayama was similar to the four guys who proposed to her. Professor Hanamoto tells her in the case of one loving someone who doesn't return their love another, people could just choose either to try or give up. He advises her to tell the four guys her true feelings. When Yamada leaves, Professor Hanamoto's thoughts reveal a third choice, but he would never say it aloud.
17	"What I don't have is a destination... ... / I don't even know how I feel" Transliteration: "Ore ni nai no wa, mokutekichi nanda... ... / Jibun no kimochi mo wakaranai" (Japanese: オレに無いのは、目的地なんだ... ... / 自分の気持ちも分からない)	August 11, 2005
Having lost Mayama from the Fujiwara Design Office, Miwako expresses her depression by buying a massage chair for their new office. Yamada, who was brooding over the proposal of her childhood friends, confronts them and turns them down properly, later wishing for their own happiness while selling cakes with Hagu. Meanwhile, Takemoto is depressed from not realizing yet what his goal in life really is, and it is giving him trouble on his job applications. He then took down the artwork he made for the art exhibition, much to a surprise for the others. His depression made the opening of their Christmas party a little dull, but Professor Hanamoto's antics made things lively. Rebuilding another artwork for his graduation art project, Takemoto suddenly collapses and is brought to the hospital to be diagnosed for an ulcer. Visited by Mitsuko and Kazuo, he decides to stay and study for another year. Takemoto was about to confess his feelings to Hagu when they were interrupted by Professor Hanamoto, who has brought him a handheld television. What they saw on television totally surprises them.
18	"If Morita-san came back... ... What would she...? Then... / He came back" Transliteration: "Morita-san ga modotte kitara... ... Kanojo wa? Soshite... / Ano hito ga kaette kita" (Japanese: 森田さんが戻って来たら... ... 彼女は? そして... ... / あの人が帰ってきた)	August 18, 2005
Morita, airing on television in a startling appearance, is given an Academy Award. After making a ruckus on the hospital ward, they were shocked to see Morita on the bed right beside Takemoto. The next day, they return to the hospital, only to see Morita well. After Professor Hanamoto drags Morita away for his thesis, Yamada asks Mayama about his work, realizing she herself is being hurt from the fact Mayama and Rika are working together. Later, Morita was given a heavy lecture by Professor Tange, but still ends up graduating due to his graduation thesis being finished and submitted in time. His work was a self-portrayed hand-made sculpture made of gold. But he returns later, enrolled as a third-year student in the Japanese painting department.
F	"You are the king of fashion / Fujiwara Design SPECIAL is this sort of story" Transliteration: "Kimi ga, oshare banchō / Fujiwara Dezain SPECIAL wa konna ohanashi" (Japanese: キミが、お洒落番長 / 藤原デザイン事務所SPECIALはこんなお話)	Unaired
Before Mayama starting working at the Fujiwara Design Office, Miwako becomes upset to see Yamazaki in a fashion magazine. It is explained why Miwako bought a shirt for Yamazaki as a practical joke. However, the shirt seems to suit him well. Each day, Miwako attempts to give Yamazaki another shirt as a practical joke, but she again fails to humiliate him, seeing him displayed the same fashion magazine. After Morita returned from America, Mayama plays shogi with Professor Hanamoto. When Takemoto and Hagu arrive, they all converse about Yamada in parties. It is explained why Yamada is the most attractive girl in every party, but she experiences love sickness after becoming drunk. Moreover, Mayama becomes responsible for caring for Yamada after every party. They then talk about Mayama time in the office. It is explained why Yamazaki was invited to a party. Miwako still becomes obsessed in trying to humiliate Yamazaki, only for him to be invited to many parties due to his popularity. Mayama and Professor Hanamoto, not realizing Takemoto and Hagu both departed, ended up calling it a night, only to see Morita right in front of them.
19	"Mayama loses sight of me, every time this happens / Time begins to move again" Transliteration: "Kōyatte itsumo, Mayama wa watashi o miushinau / Tomatta jikan ga ugokidasu" (Japanese: こうやっていつも、真山は私を見失う / 止まった時間が動き出す)	August 25, 2005
Mayama arrives at the Fujiwara Design Office, only to discover Yamada is there. After she leaves abruptly, Mayama mistaken it as Nomiya's business interest with Yamada for his love interest. Mayama then goes to the apartment to meet up with Takemoto and Morita. When the three gather to eat dinner prepared by Morita, Takemoto reminisces over the time when Morita departed to America. The following night, Mayama meets up with Takemoto, Morita, Yamada, Professor Hanamoto, Yamazaki, and Miwako at the annual school festival. Later after the festival, Yamada agrees to go with Nomiya, after she had an argument with Mayama. However, Yamada begins to have second thoughts about going out with Nomiya, as she faces the truth about her relationship with Mayama told by Nomiya. Meanwhile, at the Fujiwara Design Office, Yamazaki and Miwako talk with Morita and Mayama about Nomiya. Miwako explains to Mayama he and Nomiya have similar personality, which makes Mayama frustrated. Nomiya and Yamada bought food at a pastry shop. Nomiya brings her to the sight of a Ferris wheel at his place, while Yamada reminisces over her time with Mayama in the Ferris wheel. Yamada then admits to Nomiya he was right about her relationship with Mayama, causing her to cry. The next morning, Yamada is shocked to have stayed overnight with Nomiya, but Nomiya calms her down by offering her a ride on the Ferris wheel.
20	"Isn't it your job to care for that!? / I pray to the moon hovering in the night sky" Transliteration: "Sore o kea sunno ga anta no yakume darō! / Yozora ni ukabu tsuki ni inoru" (Japanese: それをケアすんのがアンタの役目だろう! / 夜空に浮かぶ月に祈る)	September 1, 2005
Nomiya calls Yamazaki and Miwako to the office early in the morning to assist a drunken Yamada to her father's house. Morita meets up with Mayama, and Morita tells Mayama he wants to visit the office again sometime. Mayama views pictures of Ferris wheels taken by Nomiya, noticing how much Ferris wheels meant to Nomiya. Morita finds Yamada, having great concern over her. Morita then walks her to her house. The next day, Professor Hanamoto explains to Takemoto how he became a teacher. Takemoto then tells Professor Hanamoto everyone has their future plan, except him, including Hagu. Morita becomes surprised when Hagu doesn't want her paintings to be displayed in museums and art galleries. Professor Hanamoto tells Morita it is up to Hagu to do what she wants with her art. However, Professor Hanamoto questions himself if it is the right thing to do. At the office, Yamazaki and Miwako accuses Nomiya of having a perverted personality. However, Nomiya recalls he was trying to change his ways until Mayama started working at the office, since Mayama had the same personality as him. Yamada is seen by Professor Shōda, making pottery. She had made too many potteries, which Professor Shōda realized something was troubling her.
21	"... ...It's empty... ..."; Transliteration: "... ...Karappo da... ..." (Japanese: ... ...空っぽだ... ...)	September 8, 2005
Takemoto meets with Professor Hanamoto and a businessman. The businessman offers Takemoto a job, and Takemoto quickly accepts the job. Takemoto celebrates this occasion with Morita, Mayama, Hagu, Professor Hanamoto, and Yamada. However, the businessman had declared bankruptcy. Meanwhile, the Tottori firm joins back with the Tokyo firm, resulting in some unfinished work in the Fujiwara Design Office. Yamada catches Nomiya before he walks out, dropping off some pottery at the office. Miwako tells Yamada Nomiya is headed over to the Tottori firm, which surprises Yamada. Takemoto disappears and hasn't returned to the apartment in a few days, causing the others to be worried. Professor Hanamoto concludes Takemoto wanted to be away for a while to find himself and he will return within a few days. Takemoto went away to find himself in the past, ending up at a beach. He begins to worry about the others. Morita, Mayama, and Professor Hanamoto set out to look for Takemoto. Takemoto seems to fear what his future will turn out to be.
22	"... ...When I got out of the tunnel, the view was beautiful." Transliteration: "... ...Tonneru o nukeru to totemo kirei na tokoro ni deta" (Japanese: ... ...トンネルを抜けるととてもキレイな所に出た)	September 15, 2005
Takemoto travels to many houses to get water to drink. Miwako text messages to Yamada to Nomiya, as she wonders how he is doing. Hagu believes she has been selfish for not displaying her paintings. Takemoto is uncertain to return to the apartment. Unfortunately, his bicycle breaks down when he passes by a temple. He meets with carpenters who restore temples and shrines. He decides to help them until he is able to buy a new bicycle. Professor Hanamoto reveals to Hagu that Takemoto reminds him when he was younger. Yamada meets Rika for the first time, and she eventually starts to feel sorry for Rika.
23	"... ...And once again, I begin to run... ..."; Transliteration: "... ...Soshite, boku wa mō ichido hashiridasu... ..." (Japanese: ... ...そして、僕はもう一度走り出す... ...)	September 22, 2005
Takemoto cooks for the carpenter, and they seem to like the food he prepares. Takemoto calculates he will work for ten days until he is able to buy a new bicycle. Meanwhile at the Fujiwara Design Office, Rika ask if Yamada could work with her, since she has taken an interest in Yamada's pottery. Mayama becomes worried when he hears the news. Takemoto reluctantly stays with the carpenters since they love his cooking. He gradually starts finding himself after bonding with the carpenters. One of the carpenters lends Takemoto his bicycle and gives him as a map as well, catching Takemoto by surprise. The carpenters bid farewell to Takemoto, as he leaves to finish the rest of his journey.
24	"... ...I'm here" Transliteration: "... ...Tsuita" (Japanese: ... ...ついた)	September 26, 2005
Takemoto views the map the night before he starts traveling the next morning. He comes across a store near a school and ends up eating sweet rolls. The store owner talks to him about her travels to America, offering him some corn for the trip afterward. Takemoto reminisces about the time he wished he could go to America with his father. Not paying attention, he falls off his bicycle, but manages to get back on and continues on his journey back to the apartment. When he arrives home, he goes to see Hagu. Professor Hanamoto goes to see Hagu shortly afterwards, and he finds both Takemoto and Hagu are asleep. Takemoto wakes up the next morning and receives a warm welcome from everyone. Takemoto explains to them he was simply trying to go on a journey, meeting people along the way. Takemoto was away for two months. Everyone goes to a harvest festival, and they all see the fireworks. After realizing what he leaves behind can mean so much, Takemoto admits his love for Hagu. As Takemoto spends the night with all friends in the apartment, a four-leaf clover is secretly shown next to his bicycle.

=== Honey and Clover II (2006) ===
No.	Title	Original release date
1	"… …And now, we start turning again… …"; Transliteration: "… …Soshite, bokutachi wa futatabi mawari hajimeru… …" (Japanese: … …そして、僕たちは再び回り始める... …)	June 29, 2006
Takemoto reminisces about his life when he first went to art school. He recalls about rooming with Morita and Mayama, and about meeting Hagu for the first time. Memories of Mayama and Yamada's feelings for each other are displayed. Memories of Hagu and Morita's feelings for each other are displayed as well. Flashbacks of Mayama's jealousy of Nomiya are depicted. Flashbacks of Yamada's jealousy of Rika are also depicted. Scenes of Takemoto's journey of finding himself are shown. Takemoto gets his driver's permit, showing it to all his friends.
2	"… …Still, if you insist on finding out the hard way, go ahead and see them… … / I can't say it, even if I want to" Transliteration: "… …Demo, sōdemo shinakya omoishirenainnara, iku ga ii sa… … / Iitakutemo ienakute" (Japanese: … …でも、そうでもしなきゃ思い知れないんなら、行くがいいさ... … / 言いたくても言えなくて)	July 6, 2006
Hagu starts hiccuping and Professor Hanamoto helps her stop, using his family's technique, but fails. However, Morita shows up, causing her to repeatedly and rapidly hiccup a lot. Takemoto arrives to help her, using another technique, and Hagu's hiccups stop. Yamada turns in a project to Professor Shōda, which delighted him. Yamada and Rika then celebrate for completing the project. Mayama, showing hospitality, allows Yamada and Rika to spend the night. The next morning, Kaoru meets up with Morita. Kaoru isn't satisfied to see Morita at the art school, even though Morita enjoys being there. Professor Hanamoto explains to Yamada Rika talks less to people she likes, giving examples of Mayama and himself. As Rika tells Yamada she should work full-time in pottery, Rika begins to hiccup. She tries using Professor Hanamoto's technique, but fails. Later on, Mayama shows her another technique, stopping her hiccups. Mayama, Yamada, Rika have dinner together. Yamada tries to take her mind off of her love for Mayama.
3	"Unbelievable… …It's a nine-hour drive… …! / I don't want to see your tears" Transliteration: "Shinjirannē… …Ku jikan kakan dazo… …! / Kimi no namida o mitakunai" (Japanese: 信じらんねぇ... ...9時間かかんだぞ... ...! / 君の涙を見たくない)	July 13, 2006
Hagu views Yamada's snow globe collection, given to her as souvenirs. Yamazaki discusses Nomiya's feelings for Yamada. At the Harada Design Office, Rika receives a fax she will be participating in a design competition in Spain for an art museum, which then agitates Mayama. Rika explains to Mayama he will be participating as well. However, it would take a long time to sort out the paperwork needed to participate, so they are not able to go. Later, Mayama explains to Yamada Rika checks the weather forecast on her hometown, Sapporo, since she hasn't been there in a long time. Nomiya calls Yamada to ask how she is. After a nine-hour long drive, Nomiya returns at the Fujiwara Design Office and Miwako tells him Yamada went to Tottori to see him. The next day, Yamazaki takes Yamada around town. Nomiya arrives, only to fall asleep in front of her. Nomiya takes Yamada to see sand dunes in the morning. Nomiya expresses his love for Yamada.
4	"I was the first one who couldn't take it any longer. I knew that, at least… … / I won't let you go anywhere" Transliteration: "Saki ni taekirenakunatta no wa ore datta. Kizuite wa itanda… … / Anata o doko ni mo ikasenai" (Japanese: 先に耐えきれなくなったのは俺だった.気付いてはいたんだ... … / あなたをどこにも行かせない)	July 20, 2006
The art exhibition has begun again. Professor Hanamoto thinks back to when Hagu decided not to submit her paintings in the previous art exhibition. Professor Hanamoto tells Hagu of when he went to an art exhibition and purchased a postcard of a painting of the moonlight reflected on the sea. It reminded him of how Rika's husband died and how Rika got severely injured on the beach under the moonlight. Professor Hanamoto reminisces about his feelings for Rika. Mayama goes on a train with Rika to Sapporo, surprising her. After they both take a shower, they both go to sleep for the night. Once they have arrived, Mayama and Rika drive north to a barren land. Rika visits her father's grave, then she visits her dog's grave. She thanks Mayama for coming with her to Sapporo. Rika tries to sneak out of the hotel, making Mayama angry, but then he begins to sob, not wanting to lose sight of her. Mayama goes on an airplane back to Tokyo, while Rika goes on an airplane to Spain. At the Harada Design Office, Mayama noticed the hotel room in Spain had two bedrooms, one for Mayama and one for Rika.
5	"That's right... ...He's allowed to be closer to her now... ... / Joyful yet in pain" Transliteration: "Sō, kare wa... ...yasashiku shiau koto o yurusaretanoda... ... / Ureshii noni kurushikute" (Japanese: そう、彼は... ...優しくしあうことを許されたのだ... ... / 嬉しいのに苦しくて)	July 27, 2006
Miwako discusses Yamada's work in pottery, complimenting on her work. They go to a spa and resort to celebrate her accomplishment. Yamada later notices Miwako was trying to cheer her up, causing her to cry. Nomiya becomes worried she is staying at Miwako's house. The next day Takemoto is infuriated Morita ate his bread. However, Hagu offers to share some of her bread with him. Takemoto declines, and Morita eats her bread instead. Soon after, Morita receives a call from Kaoru. Kaoru asks Morita to do one more job, which he hesitantly accepts. Takemoto wants to get a driver's license as soon as possible in order to work full-time with the carpenters he had met from his journey. Takemoto asks Mayama why he still lives at the apartment, and Mayama says he is saving money for Rika. Yamada waits in the Fujiwara Design Office for Miwako, but Nomiya unexpectedly visits. Yamada starts to develop feelings for Nomiya.
6	"... ...I can't say it... ...I have no right to take it from him... ... / We would never go to the beach" Transliteration: "... ...Kuchi ni shite wa dame... ... Watashi ni wa, sore o ubau kenri wa nai... ... / Bokutachi wa, umi ni iku koto wa nakatta" (Japanese: ... ...口にしてはダメ... ...、私には、それを奪う権利はない... ... / 僕たちは、海に行く事はなかった)	August 3, 2006
Morita reminisces about his father when he was younger. Some students are preparing to submit their projects to Morita's father, however he decides to leave home early. He shows Morita and Kaoru one of his inventions, then they all eat curry for dinner. In the present, both Takemoto and Hagu show appreciation for art, wanting to do more with their art. At the Fujiwara Design Office, Mayama tells Nomiya, Miwako, and Yamazaki that Rika is in Spain participating in the design competition, working with another architect. Rika contacts Mayama to come to Spain. After Yamada finds out the news, Nomiya catches up with her to console her. Professor Hanamoto tells Morita he needs to talk to Hagu, so he doesn't lose her as a friend. However, Morita refuses. Kaoru reminisces about his father when he was younger. His father paid more attention to Morita than to Kaoru, due to Morita's artistic talent. The next day, Yamada plans everyone to go to the beach. However, since Mayama would be in Spain for a month, the plan didn't work out in the end.
7	"... ... That time of my life is burned into my memory, and it keeps coming back to me... ... / Forward, towards the light" Transliteration: "... ...Ano toki no koto ga, me ni yakitsuite hanarenai... ... / Mae ni, hikari no sasu hōkō ni" (Japanese: ... ...あのときのことが、目に焼き付いて離れない... ... / 前に、光の差す方向に)	August 10, 2006
Kaoru thinks about his father again. In a laboratory, his father shows one of his employees an invention, only to be disappointed at his reaction. Kaoru then thinks back to when Morita made a remote-controlled airplane, and their father was very proud of Morita. It is revealed their father favors Morita over Kaoru. Their uncle, their father's business partner, tells Kaoru their father is very much like Morita, reckless and eccentric. Their uncle was diagnosed with a disease, restricting him from working. The uncle stops working alongside the father. Instead, he joins with another business, Floyd Electric. Floyd Electric comes to the laboratory to see the father. The father knew already the uncle betrayed him. The uncle tells the father about his disease, and if he were to die, all the rights to his money goes to Floyd Electric, not the father. Morita, Kaoru, and their father leaves the laboratory after all this. Morita wakes up from a dream of how Kaoru envied Morita and his father. A windstorm whooshes on the campus grounds during the art exhibition, and something unexpected happens.
8	"... ...I had no idea. / We had no idea" Transliteration: "... ...Boku wa, nani mo shiranakatta / Bokutachi wa, nani mo shiranakatta" (Japanese: ... ...僕は、なにも知らなかった. / 僕たちは、なにも知らなかった)	August 17, 2006
Takemoto tells Hagu he wants to work with the carpenters, restoring temples and shrines. Hagu mentions after graduation, everyone will part ways. The windstorm starts to whoosh when the art exhibition will soon start. Mayama meets with the Spanish architect, developing jealousy over him for Rika. Mayama is upset to find out the hotel bedrooms were separate rooms, not one room. The unexpected occurrence during the windstorm was Hagu got severely injured outside the apartment. Everyone becomes very worried. Morita and Kaoru buys out Floyd Electric, making them in charge. Takemoto says Hagu was operated on her head and her right hand, having stitches for her injury. Takemoto and Yamada visit Hagu in the hospital, but Professor Hanamoto asks them to leave. Professor Hanamoto explains to Hagu her stitches will come off in ten days, but she will remain in the hospital for two months and undergo physical therapy.
9	"... …Oh, God… ...Please, help her… ... / I reflect on my own powerlessness" Transliteration: "… ...Aa, kami-sama... ... dōka, kanojo o… … / Jibun no muryoku o kamishimeru" (Japanese: ... ...ああ、神様... ...どうか、彼女を... ... / 自分の無力を噛み締める)	August 24, 2006
Kaoru explains his jealousy of Morita, and Morita questions Kaoru's jealousy. Professor Hanamoto tells Takemoto and Yamada Hagu isn't doing so well. She is waiting a very long time to be able to have feeling in her right hand, since it was numb after her surgery. Professor Hanamoto then tells them Hagu might suffer sensory impairments in her right hand for the rest of her life, and she might not be able to paint anymore. Yamada tells Nomiya she would want a cell phone in order to contact Hagu during her stay at the hospital. Yamada knits a sweater for Hagu and visits her in the hospital. Professor Hanamoto meets with the physical therapist, as she gives him instructions to massage Hagu's stiff upper body. Takemoto and Yamada go to a garden to pick flowers for Hagu, and they visit her again. Professor Hanamoto tells Takemoto and Yamada Hagu will gain her sense of feeling over time, however he says to them they should be concentrating on their lives, and not Hagu's. Takemoto is worried to leave Hagu after graduation, because he doesn't want to see her in pain and suffering. He wants to be able to help Hagu recover, but he is struggling to decide whether to help her or leave her.
10	"… …Where did you go, you idiot… … / I saw God once when I was little" Transliteration: "… …Doko, itchatterunoyo, baka… … / Chiisai koro, ichido dake kami-sama o mita" (Japanese: … …どこ、行っちゃってるのよ、バカ... … / 小さい頃、一度だけ神様を見た)	August 31, 2006
Yamada visits Hagu again, but Professor Hanamoto took Hagu to do a contrast bath therapy session after her physical therapy session. The physical therapist tells Yamada Hagu is a strong person, never giving up because of feeling pain. However, it is possible Hagu may never be able to paint again, due to her condition. In Spain, Mayama goes out of his way to prevent the Spanish architect from seeing Rika. Morita, unexpectedly visits Hagu, as he is very worried about her condition. A jealous Takemoto accidentally injures himself when he finds out Yamada caused Morita to return. Borrowing Yamada's bicycle, he quickly rides to the hospital. Professor Hanamoto tests Hagu's level of pain in her right hand. She doesn't cry like other children would, however Professor Hanamoto tells it is alright to cry. Hagu reminds herself drawing was a part of her life. Later, Takemoto arrives and finds Professor Hanamoto to ask where Hagu is. After Professor Hanamoto was uncertain, Takemoto determined Morita took her with him. At his place, Morita tries to comfort Hagu, kissing her. Meanwhile, Professor Hanamoto tells Takemoto he will take a break from teaching. Takemoto wonders if Hagu will be with Morita, but Professor Hanamoto ignores him, making his way back to the hospital.
11	"... ...Please, don't take my drawings away from me... ... / Please give me your life" Transliteration: "… …Watashi kara, e o kaku koto o, ubawanai de kudasai… … / Anata no jinsei o, watashi ni kudasai" (Japanese: … …私から、絵を描くことを、奪わないでください... … / あなたの人生を、私にください)	September 7, 2006
After spending the night with Morita, Hagu wakes up and sees her right hand swollen, frightening her. Morita takes her back to the hospital, meeting up with Professor Hanamoto. Takemoto encounters Morita outside the hospital. Takemoto takes Morita to Hagu's place, questioning himself if Hagu will be able to paint again. Professor Hanamoto visits Hagu again, and Hagu asks if Professor Hanamoto can give up his life for her, and Professor Hanamoto reluctantly accepts. Hagu reminisces about the time she was with Professor Hanamoto when she was younger. Professor Hanamoto was always with her. Takemoto and Morita wake up early in the morning. Takemoto and Morita soon begin to fight over Hagu, but soon reconcile. Morita delivers a box to Professor Hanamoto, but Professor Hanamoto only takes some money and gives the box back to Morita. Professor Hanamoto admits his love for Hagu.
12	"… …In time, there will come a day when everything is just a memory / With honey and clovers" Transliteration: "… …Toki ga sugite, nani mo kamo ga omoide ni naru hi wa kitto kuru / Hachimitsu to kurōbā to" (Japanese: … …時が過ぎて、何もかもが思い出になる日はきっと来る / ハチミツとクローバーと)	September 14, 2006
Yamada questions Professor Hanamoto's love for Hagu. Mayama is happy for Professor Hanamoto for admitting his love for Hagu. Yamada regrets telling Morita about Hagu's accident. Mayama explains to Yamada Hagu had art as a part of her life, so her love for Morita was uncertain in the past. Professor Hanamoto prepares to take a break from teaching and informs Rika about it. Rika explains to Professor Hanamoto that Mayama has scolded her about him. Kaoru feels guilty for allowing the former boss of Floyd Electric to live with his children and grandchildren. Hagu compares Yamada to a dove, and Hagu would want to make origami doves for Yamada. Morita tells Kaoru about the fun employees and about the strong Hagu. Everyone celebrates the graduation of Takemoto and Hagu. This will be the last night before Takemoto leaves. Takemoto and Hagu are sent to buy ice cream. Hagu worries about Professor Hanamoto, but Takemoto tells her not to worry. As Takemoto leaves on a train, Hagu bids him farewell, giving him some bread. Within each sandwich there is some honey and a four-leaf clover. Along with the precious memories of his time with all his friends and Hagu to never forget.

== See also ==
- List of Honey and Clover characters
