= Blood Lad =

Japanese manga series

- Cover of the first manga volume featuring Staz Charlie Blood (center) and the supporting characters (background)

ブラッドラッド (Buraddo Raddo)
- Genre: Action, dark comedy, vampire
- Manga
- Written by: Yuuki Kodama
- Published by: Kadokawa Shoten
- English publisher: NA: Yen Press
- Magazine: Young Ace
- Original run: September 4, 2009 – September 3, 2016
- Volumes: 17
- Light novel
- Written by: Yasaka Kei
- Illustrated by: Kanata Yoshino
- Published by: Kadokawa Shoten
- Imprint: Kadokawa Sneaker Bunko
- Published: July 1, 2013
- Volumes: 1
- Manga

Bloody Brat
- Written by: Yuuki Kodama
- Published by: Kadokawa Shoten
- English publisher: NA: Yen Press
- Magazine: Altima Ace; (2011-2012); 4-Koma Nano Ace; (2012-2013)
- Original run: October 18, 2011 – July 4, 2013
- Volumes: 2
- Anime television series
- Directed by: Shigeyuki Miya
- Written by: Takeshi Konuta
- Music by: Yuki Hayashi
- Studio: Brain's Base
- Licensed by: AUS: Hanabee; NA: Viz Media; SEA: Medialink; UK: Anime Limited
- Original network: TVK, Tokyo MX, SUN, BS11, TVS, TVQ, GBS, MTV, CTC
- English network: NA: Viz Anime Neon Alley
- Original run: July 7, 2013 – September 8, 2013
- Episodes: 10 + OVA
- icon

Blood Lad (ブラッドラッド, Buraddo Raddo) is a Japanese manga series written and illustrated by Yuuki Kodama and serialized in Young Ace. It follows Staz, a vampire from the surreal Demon World, who meets Fuyumi Yanagi, an ordinary Japanese high school girl who accidentally wanders into the Demon World through a portal. Shortly after their meeting Fuyumi is killed by a carnivorous plant and turned into a ghost, causing Staz to take responsibility and pledge to help bring her back to life. An anime adaptation aired between July and September 2013.

In North America, the manga has been licensed for an English language release by Yen Press. The anime series has been licensed by Viz Media for streaming on their website VizAnime and home video distribution in 2014. Neon Alley also acquired the series for streaming on their web service.

== Plot ==
Staz is a powerful vampire boss of a territory in the Demon World. Unlike his vampire ancestors, he prefers not to prey on humans, and would rather indulge in their Japanese otaku lifestyle of reading manga, watching anime, and playing video games. One day, he becomes excited when Fuyumi Yanagi, an ordinary Japanese high school girl, accidentally wanders into the Demon World through a portal. The two's first meeting is cut short by the attack of a demon who challenges his territory. When Staz goes to stop the demon, Fuyumi is killed by a carnivorous plant and turned into a ghost. Staz takes responsibility and pledges to help bring her back to life. When they take the portal, they learn that Fuyumi needs to drink Staz's blood in order to not fade away. They meet Hydra Bell, a treasure hunter who reveals her ability to open and close the portal was stolen, and that in order to restore Fuyumi they need the Book of Resurrection.

After challenging his friend Wolf, who is the boss of Demon World West, he learns that Bell has the Book, but that Staz needs to get his big brother Braz to interpret it for him. Braz agrees to interpret the book provided that Staz stops Papradon Akim, a creature who tears his fallen enemies apart and uses their body parts to improve himself and his abilities. Meanwhile, Wolf and scientist Franken Stein (who created Akim) try to find a substitute to keep Fuyumi from fading. After Wolf fights Akim and Staz defeats Akim, Braz recruits Franken Stein to secretly work on another creature.

Fuyumi is taken by Bell's brother Knell and delivered to their mother Neyn, who reveals that she is the fusion of the mother of Bell and the mother of Fuyumi, making the two girls sisters. Neyn asks Staz whether he is going to care for Fuyumi, which Staz agrees, so she releases him, only to later send a team of assassins called Team Fearless to hunt down Staz. Meanwhile, the Demon World Acropolis police officers Beros and Goyle arrest Braz for conspiring to overthrow the king of the demon world, Wolf Daddy. Braz escapes but agrees to deliver to Wolf Daddy a challenger to the throne. He places Akim's heart in the body of his late father and former king Richarz and revives him. However Richarz is no mood to fight Wolf Daddy.

Braz and Staz learn that Richarz and Wolf Daddy had sealed up the essence of the demon king Herrschaft Grimm behind a door, but that it is too powerful. Akim manages to revive and recover his heart, killing Richarz and then absorbing Grimm's essence to become the new king of the Demon World. Wolf Daddy and the gang are forced to escape, while Braz stays on as a servant to Akim. Staz and Wolf want to take the throne back from Akim, so they start training under one of Wolf Daddy's old friends White Step. Akim creates a team of minions to harvest more body parts to grow stronger. To minimize this expansion, Wolf Daddy offers to Akim to fight a group of demons on the black list, a list of criminals who were so powerful they were hidden away and their existence erased from record. Akim agrees, and Wolf Daddy arranges for the blacklisted demons to come and train themselves.

== Characters ==
=== Main characters ===
Staz Charlie Blood (ブラッド・チャーリー・スタズ, Buraddo Chārī Sutazu)
Voiced by: Ryōta Ōsaka (Japanese); Bryce Papenbrook (English)
Staz is one of the territory bosses of Demon World East. Although he is the descendant of the noble vampire Dracula who would go to the human world to suck blood, he shows no interest in the vampire lifestyle, preferring to indulge himself in Japanese culture and media. For secondary vampire characteristics, he does not fly or have bat wings, he can eat garlic, he is not susceptible to crosses, and he heals rapidly.^{Ch. 1} He is immediately attracted to Fuyumi, but when she is killed and becomes a ghost, he makes it his mission to bring her back to life. He struggles with his feelings about her, whether it is his desire to suck her dry as a mummy or whether it could be something romantic.^{Vol. 1} In the human world, he carries a spray bottle of his spit that allows him to manipulate the memories of the humans there. He can also revive Fuyumi by giving her some of his blood.^{Ch. 3} He describes his abilities as radiating with a range of up to tens of meters.^{Ch. 6} When he was younger, his brother Braz sealed his full potential power by shooting him with a special bullet.^{Ch. 9} This was because he was unable to handle his power and would collapse in a nose bleed after using the power. He is later freed from the restriction.^{Ch. 12}
Fuyumi Yanagi (柳 冬実, Yanagi Fuyumi)
Voiced by: Iori Nomizu (Japanese); Xanthe Huynh (English)
Fuyumi is a Japanese high school girl who got lost in the Demon World after wandering into a portal that had opened in her bedroom. She is eaten by a carnivorous plant demon, and ends up a ghost / demon, leaving behind only her bones and clothes. She wears a characteristic triangular white cloth on her head as a result. She accompanies Staz on his quest to bring her back to life. In the human world, she risks fading away so she must be replenished by Staz's blood or other methods. Prior to her adventures with Staz, she has been living with her father, but the whereabouts of her mother is unknown.^{Ch. 3} When she starts fading in the demon world, Frankie discovers she might have a hybrid of demon attributes.^{Ch. 9-10} It is later revealed that she and Bell became sisters, as her mother had merged with her doppelgänger counterpart from the demon world when they met each other.^{Ch. 27}
Hydrabell (ハイドラベル, Haidora Beru)
Voiced by: Sarah Emi Bridcutt (Japanese); Kira Buckland (English)
Hydrabell, or Bell for short, is a treasure hunter who is able to travel across dimensions and between the human and demon world using the Black Curtain. She initially appears with a large backpack with scrolls on its pockets. Her goal is to catch the magic thief who stole her ability to put away the Black Curtain that brought Fuyumi into the demon world, and then make that thief her lover-boy.^{Ch. 4} She can teleport people away using a picture frame as the portal, and can spy on people by finger framing like a photographer.^{Ch. 4} Although she determines that Staz is not the magic thief, she grows attracted to Staz,^{Ch. 8-9} and secretly plans to win his affections.^{Ch. 24-25} She learns later that Akim, when he was Pantomime, was the magic thief. The Volume 4 extra shows her corresponding with VIPs such as Bill Gates.^{Vol. 4 extra}. It is later revealed that her mother had met her doppelgänger counterpart on Earth and merged, making her and Fuyumi sisters.^{Ch. 27}
Wolf (ウルフ, Urufu)
Voiced by: Takuma Terashima (Japanese); Ben Diskin (English)
He is the hybrid lycanthrope who controls most of Demon World West. He is Staz's friend and rival, having known each other since Staz ran away from Acropolis. Staz says that Wolf uses his magic to strengthen his own body so he can excel in beating up on an opponent.^{Ch. 6} He is of noble blood and was supposed to live in Acropolis, but admitted that he was abandoned because he is not a pure-blooded werewolf. According to himself, he is "a mix of lycanthrope and nobody".^{Ch. 8} He can assume his fully transformed form for about three minutes, although if not done right, he only partially transforms.^{Ch. 14}

=== Supporting characters ===
==== Demon World East ====
Dek (デク, Deku)
Voiced by: Taichi Yones (Japanese); Kyle Hebert (English)
Staz's right-hand man. He is often the one leading the gang when outside and patrolling whenever Staz is busy with his Japanese media.^{Ch. 1, Vol. 1 extra}
Saty (サティ, Sati)
Saty is the manager of the Third Eye Cafe in the demon world. She and Mamejirou have clairvoyant powers thanks to her third eye. She does not speak, relying on Mamejirou to communicate her thoughts. She is able to stop Staz and Mamejirou from fighting with an intimidating stare.^{Ch. 2, Vol. 2 extra}
Mamejirou (豆次郎, Mamejirō)
Voiced by: Chiwa Saitō (Japanese); Cristina Vee (English)
A three-eyed talking weasel-like demon who works at the Third Eye Cafe along with his partner Saty. He is very talkative. He and Saty have clairvoyant powers.^{Ch. 2} He appears regularly inside the jacket covers for the Japanese graphic novel publications.
Mimic Yoshida (ミミック吉田, Mimikku Yoshida; alt. Yoshida the Mimic)
Voiced by: Kazutomi Yamamoto (Japanese); Max Mittelman (English)
Yoshida is a doppelganger who joins Staz's gang, serving as Staz's double whenever he is away.^{Ch. 2, 3}

==== Demon World West ====
Kiji (キジ)
Voiced by: Shūsaku Shirakawa (Japanese); Matthew Mercer (English)
Wolf's underling. He has light hair and wears a black turtleneck.^{Ch. 8}
Tobi (トビ)
Voiced by: Kenji Roa (Japanese); Todd Haberkorn (English)
Wolf's underling. He wears a knit cap and has dark hair.^{Ch. 8}
Franken Stein (フランケン・シュタイン, Furanken Shutain)
Voiced by: Tetsu Inada (Japanese); Patrick Seitz (English)
A scientist within the Demon World, named after the scientist who had stitched body parts of humans together, and whom he calls his ancestor.^{Ch. 12} He is an expert on demon physiology and conducts experiments on demons. He is interested in experimenting on Fuyumi,^{Vol. 2} He had worked on an experiment to create a supreme body based on stitching together the body parts of demons; the result was Papradon Akim.^{Ch. 12}

==== Demon World Acropolis ====
Braz D. Blood (ブラッド・D・ブラッズ, Buraddo Dī Burazzu)
Voiced by: Ryōhei Kimura (Japanese); Johnny Yong Bosch (English)
Staz and Liz's older brother. He is the one who wrote the book of resurrection that Staz and the others believe can bring Fuyumi back to life. When they were younger, he conducted experiments on Staz to unlock his true potential. He later sealed Staz's powers away with a magic bullet that he shot into Staz's heart.^{Ch. 9} While his intentions are always under suspicion from Staz, his motive is to dethrone Wolf Daddy's reign as King of Acropolis,^{Ch. 25} since Wolf Daddy had killed his father.^{Ch. 29} He orchestrates the creation of Papradon Akim and has Staz test his strength on him. One of his abilities is to manipulate blood.^{Ch. 27}
Liz T. Blood (ブラッド・T・リズ, Buraddo Tī Rizu)
Voiced by: Yūka Nanri (Japanese); Sherry Lynn (English)
Liz is Braz and Staz's younger sister. She has a great respect for her eldest brother Braz and a deep disdain for her older brother Staz. This is partly because Staz ran away from home and partly because Braz would spend all his time on Staz. She is the jailer of Acropolis and has the power to judge and imprison demons in her own personal dungeon known as Liz's Toy Box.^{Vol. 2}Liz comes to care for Staz and admire him after seeing his real power (that Braz sealed). She takes a liking to Fuyumi after finding that Fuyumi isn't afraid of her or seeking to win her favor.^{Ch. 19}
Beros (べロス)
Voiced by: Masumi Asano (Japanese); Julie Ann Taylor (English)
Beros is the peacekeeper of the Acropolis Police.^{Ch. 20} She is in the form of a girl wearing a visor cap, a black top and uneven-length shorts for uniform, and she has a tail whose end is a snake head. She uses a collar called an Underdog Choker which restricts the wearer from using magic.^{Ch. 21} Outside of police activities, Beros is part of a music band where she plays bass guitar.^{Vol. 6 extra, Vol. 10}
Wolf Daddy (ウルフダディ, Urufu Dadi)
Voiced by: Norio Wakamoto (Japanese); Richard Epcar (English)
King of the Demon World Acropolis.^{Ch. 20, 25} He is Wolf's biological father and killer of the Blood siblings' father Richarz, the previous king.^{Ch. 29} In the later story, it is revealed that Wolf, Richarz and Heads are good friends, and that he had killed Richarz at the latter's request when he had been infused with Grimm's magic essence.^{Vol. 9-10} He was part of a secret task force called the Demon Colors under the previous king where he went under the name Red Wolf.^{Vol. 11}
Goyle (ゴイル, Goiru)
Voiced by: Daisuke Kishio (Japanese); Ben Pronsky (English)
Captain in the Acropolis. He wears glasses and has a barbed tail.^{Ch. 25} He works with computers.^{Ch. 26, Vol. 6 extra} He uses anger to summon and to power up his demon pet creature named Angry Spear.^{Ch. 26, 36} He also has a power called Cool Decision, which lets him freeze his opponent if they touch his head.^{Ch. 29, 37}
Papradon Akim (パップラドン・アキム, Papladon Akimu)
Voiced by: Kōji Yusa (Japanese); Lucien Dodge (English)
He is a monstrosity created by Franken Stein stitched up by the body parts of demons. In order to obtain stronger parts for his body, he escaped from Franken's lab via spatial magic and began hunting and killing demons with exceptional magical properties in order to harvest their limbs.^{Ch. 12} Akim's true form is that of a phantom and he uses magic to manipulate the separate body parts which make up his physical form.^{Ch. 14} Akim's entire creation was orchestrated by Braz, who anonymously delivered a demon corpse to Franken to serve as the central container for Akim.^{Ch. 17, 20} The corpse was later revealed to be a spy from Wolf Daddy named Pantomime.^{Ch. 25} Akim's heart is placed in a new vessel that turns out to be Braz's father Richarz, but Akim is unable to control the body and only serves as a power source to keep the heart beating.^{Ch. 34} Akim later comes back to life, taking the heart out of Richarz's body, and absorbing Grimm's magic to take over Demon World Acropolis.^{Vol. 9-10}
Team Fearless (チームフィアレス, Chīmu Fiaresu)
A group of assassins sent by Neyn to hunt down Staz. Although they have never actually killed a vampire before, they hope that this would elevate their standing at the Acropolis. They consist of: Shamkid "the leader" who can transform into a cat and can foretell a person's actions after having a piece of their hair; Sam "the veteran" who sports a ponytail and an eyepatch, and wields a katana; Jasmine "the looks"who is dressed as a jiangshi, speaks Chinese, and wields a claw weapon; Roy "the brain" who wears a striped shirt, handles navigation for their team airship, and whose special ability includes falling asleep to enable a "chat room" that allows the team to communicate with each other telepathically; and Rando "the brawn" a mummy who was able to capture Fuyumi inside his body.^{Vol. 7} After Akim takes over the Acropollis, they join Akim's staff as an elite squad where they help cook and clean, while secretly thinking of ways to depose him.^{Vol. 11}
Richarz (ブラッド・リチャーズ, Buraddo Richāzu)
The father of the Blood siblings. He had lost the throne when he was killed by Wolf Daddy who crushed his heart, but ten years later, he is brought back to life by Braz using Akim's heart.^{Ch. 34, 38} However, Akim is able to grab the heart back.^{Vol. 9} It is revealed that he, his wife and Wolf Daddy were part of the original squad that tried to contain the old king Grimm but he had lost his wife and his heart got corrupted by Grimm's essence, so he asked Wolf Daddy to kill him.^{Vol. 9}
Kelly and Burgundy (ケリーとバーガンディ, Kerī to Bāgandi)
Kelly and Burgundy are female demon servants created by Akim infused with Akim's Grimm magic and some of the top organs harvested by Akim. Kelly has light hair and dark skin, and dresses with a tank top with a zig-zag stripe, a cheetah animal print wrap skirt and black pants. Burgundy wears a mask, rabbit ears and tail. a single strap top, black bikini bottom, and thigh-high knee socks. Their mission is to scour the Demon World territories and grab the best organs to harvest.^{Vol. 10-11}
Amber (アンバー, Anbā)
Amber was created by Akim as another demon to fight with him against the blacklisted demons. He has a mohawk hairstyle. He was rated a little stronger than the two demon girls, but was still unable to beat Akim in their sparring match.^{Ch. 60-61}

==== Dimensional Highway ====
The Dimensional Highway is one of the seven wonders of the demon world. It is described as a labyrinth of countless doors.^{Ch. 21}

Knell (ネル, Neru)
Voiced by: Yūki Kaji (Japanese); Erik Scott Kimerer (English)
Knell is a transporter and takes on jobs to transport goods to different locations.^{Ch. 21} He is the younger brother of Bell, and fellow spatial magic user.^{Ch. 21-22} He was born after Neyn had fused so his demon powers are not as strong as Bell's.^{Ch. 28}
Neyn (ネイン, Nein)
Voiced by: Kotono Mitsuishi (Japanese); Wendee Lee (English)
Bell and Knell's mother. She has dark hair,^{Ch. 21} but originally had light hair when Bell was a child.^{Ch. 27} Fourteen years ago, when she met her doppelgänger counterpart in the human world, who happened to be Fuyumi's mother, she fused with her and became one person (she has heterochromia). She had since agreed to live in the demon world with Heads.^{Ch. 24, 27} She and Braz are e-mail friends.^{Ch. 25}
Heads (ヘッズ, Hezzu)
Voiced by: Keiji Fujiwara (Japanese); Keith Silverstein (English)
Heads Hydra is Neyn's husband and Bell and Knell's father. Initially appearing as a flying multi-headed serpent, he assumes a human shape where he typically wears a "I ♥ Neyn" T-shirt and pajamas that he had during their honeymoon.^{Ch. 28}

==== Other characters ====
Yanagi (柳)
Voiced by: Eiichiro Tokumoto (Japanese); Matt Mercer (English)
Fuyumi's father.^{Ch. 3} He was aware of the Demon World's existence following his wife's fusion with Neyn and decided to give up being with her to Heads Hydra to instead raise Fuyumi on his own.^{Ch. 28} He has a Demon World counterpart who works as a butler to the Hydra family.^{Ch. 27}
Katy (ケイティ, Keiti)
Wolf's mother and Wolf Daddy's estranged wife. She lives on Earth where she is a school teacher. Although Wolf Daddy covets her powers, Katy says her time on Earth has diminished them so she is willing to teach Wolf how to use his powers so she doesn't have to return to the demon world.^{Ch. 35}
White Step (ホワイトステップ, Howaito Suteppu)
White Step is a colleague of Wolf Daddy; they were in a secret task force called the Demon Colors under the king. He is a human who has survived in the demon world using his dodging skills and living off the grid. He trains Staz and Wolf in the art of dodging, and agrees to let the Blacklist be exposed if it will protect his demon disciple Pati. He resides in Demon World North.^{Vol. 11}
Pati (パティ)
White Step's demon disciple who appears as a boy. Although he appears to be rather meek, he transforms into a beast. His name was kept off the Blacklist when it was revealed as part of White Step's negotiations with Wolf Daddy.^{Vol. 11}
Blacklist demons
The blacklist demons are ones who are not bounded by any demon territory and have gone off the grid. They are very strong demons that are coveted by Akim. Outside of Pati, Wolf Daddy has brought in the following demons:

- Steel Evil Jack is a blacklisted demon who is regarded as the most notorious criminal in the Demon World. Wherever he goes, there are evacuation alerts. He has gone into prison where he waits for a suitable challenger.^{Ch. 55} He has a special transformation called the Berserker Lurk.^{Ch. 57}
- Shteyn Doji is a blacklisted oni (ogre demon) who once united many ogre tribes. He aspires to be a singer, but his voice knocked out five thousand ogres, that he became despondent and exiled himself to an island.^{Ch. 55} His voice paralyzes opponents to their spot.^{Ch. 57}
- Elforess is a blacklisted elf demon who protects a forest over in Demon World West. No one has ever seen her, prior to her arrival with the blacklist group.^{Ch. 55}

== Media ==
=== Manga ===
The manga was written and drawn by Yuuki Kodama and serialized in Young Ace from September 4, 2009 to September 3, 2016, and compiled in 17 volumes. The series was later licensed for distribution in English by Yen Press, alongside its spinoff Bloody Brat. and released as an omnibus edition where each volume contains two of the Japanese volumes of the series, except for the final omnibus edition (volume 9) which contains the final manga volume.

==== Volumes ====
No.	Original release date	Original ISBN	English release date	English ISBN
1	April 28, 2010	978-4-04-715433-9	December 11, 2012	978-0-31-6228954-
1. "I Was a Skeleton" (骨でした。, Hone Deshita.); 2. Noko Buffet; 3. Back Home, But Not Really; 4. Ogre Undies; 5. A Bird That Can't Fly
Staz, a powerful vampire boss of a territory in Demon World East, is elated when he meets Fuyumi Yanagi, a Japanese human girl who had wandered into the Demon World. Instead of drinking her blood, he talks to her about his love for Japanese cultural media. After being called to beat down a challenger to his territory, he returns to find that Fuyumi had been killed, leaving only her soul behind as a ghost and some of her bones, Staz pledges to help restore her body. They discover that Fuyumi entered the world through a portal called the Black Curtain. When they visit the human world and Fuyumi's school, Fuyumi discovers she cannot stay there for long because she will fade away. They meet the curtain's owner, Hydrabell, who tells Staz he must overcome a challenge nearby, where he ends up fighting an oni demon shopkeeper to acquire a set of ogre panties. Bell tells them that a thief had taken away her ability to close the portal, and also that in order to restore Fuyumi, they need to find the Book of Human Resurrection. Staz, Fuyumi, and a demon animal Mamejirou board a transport to head to Demon World West where they are to meet up with Wolf, the boss of most of that territory.
2	July 31, 2010	978-4-04-715433-9	December 11, 2012	978-0-31-622895-4
6. A Match You Can't Lose; 7. The Payback Plan; 8. The Acropolis; 9. The Three Bloods; 10. Fuyumi Inside
Staz asks Wolf to help him find the Book of Human Resurrection, but they have a competition first, where, if Staz loses, he would have to give up Fuyumi. Hoping to have a bowling match, Staz is surprised to find the competition will be a boxing match, which favors Wolf and his close-combat abilities. Staz and Wolf's fight is fairly even though, as Staz devises a plan where he saps Wolf's energy. However, Bell interrupts the fight, declaring it a draw, and reveals to them that she has the book. Staz and Wolf are unable to make sense of the book as it is encrypted. Staz heads to the Demon World Acropolis to seek an audience with his brother Braz, the author of the book, but is intercepted by his sister Liz, who imprisons him. In order to escape, Staz would have to beat some powerful zombie guards. When Fuyumi starts fading away in the Demon World, Wolf takes her to the scientist Franken Stein who reveals that she is no ordinary demon.
3	February 2, 2011	978-4-04-715621-0	March 26, 2013	978-0316228985
11. Bad Blood; 12. Unidentified Demon Object; 13. Wham! Goes the Witness; 14. Wolf Doesn't Half-### It; 15. It's a Nerd Thing
Braz arrives at Liz's prison and easily figures out that Liz has been holding Staz. Franken Stein tells Wolf he will save Fuyumi on the condition that Wolf stop Papradon Akim, a demon who has been wreaking havoc in the Demon World by collecting body parts and stitching them to himself to improve his abilities. Braz offers to decode the book of human resurrection for Staz on the condition that he defeat Akim. He releases Staz's power restraints. Wolf fights Akim, transforming for a brief time. Staz arrives and fights Akim using a move from his favorite superhero.
4	June 2, 2011	978-4-04-715714-9	March 26, 2013	978-0-31-622898-5
16. That's the Important Thing; 17. That's Friendship; 18. Resurrection Available Here; 19. Liz, for the First Time; 20. The Ghost Thief and the Guard Dog
With his freed powers, Staz easily defeats Akim, and uses his special finishing move to destroy him, after which Wolf briefly challenges Staz to see if he is even a match for Staz anymore. Bell steals parts of Akim before Staz uses his move, and gives them to Franken, however, Braz and Liz arrive to arrest Franken. Braz restores Fuyumi so that she can rely on Staz's blood to sustain herself again. Braz extracts a sample of Fuyumi's essence and agrees to work on her resurrection, while secretly coveting Staz's blood that was mixed in. Liz stays around to keep an eye on Staz, and learns a little of Staz's otaku lifestyle. But when Fuyumi is abducted, Staz has Liz return to the Acropolis to find out what Braz is really up to. Meanwhile, Franken learns that Braz was the one who gave him the body of Akim, and he is offered a job to work on upgrading Akim in the prison which is Braz's secret lab.
5	December 1, 2011	978-4-04-120015-5	May 28, 2013	978-0-31-625092-4
21. Ramen on the Run, Totally; 22. Two Is a Treasure; 23. Square Driver; 24. Pantser on Fire; 25. The Crime of Glasses
Staz and the gang split up to look for Fuyumi. Staz learns that the abductor is a transporter called Knell, who plans to bring Fuyumi to his mother Neyn. When Fuyumi is able to signal where she is, Staz and Bell arrive, but Bell sides with Knell who is her brother, challenging Staz to a fight. While teleporting, Bell accidentally leaves her panties and her backpack on the floor. She tries to trick Staz into thinking she needs the panties, but gives up the fight when Staz discovers her diary. She then brings him to her family. Fuyumi meets Neyn and receives a big hug. Meanwhile, Officer Beros puts a choker on Braz to restrict his magic, and escorts him to meet Wolf Daddy, the king of the demon world. Braz tells Wolf Daddy that he plans to dethrone him, but that Braz will not be the one that replaces him as king.
6	May 31, 2012	978-4-04-120285-2	May 28, 2013	978-0-31-625092-4
26. Anger + Glasses ≡ Crack!; 27. Okonomiyaki Assortment; 28. Super Young; 29. A Tiny Room of Curses and Oaths; 30. The Antihero
Wolf Daddy tells Braz that he has three days to deliver the person who would try to replace the King, Braz tricks Beros into releasing the choker on him, knocks her out and escapes. Thinking that Beros was killed, Captain Goyle pursues Braz through Acropolis and they fight until Braz assures Goyle that Beros is alive, but that he could kill her easily with one of his special abilities. Braz explains that Wolf Daddy had killed the previous king who was Braz's father. Liz arrives to fight Goyle but when Braz transports them out he only ends up with Liz'a ax. Meanwhile, Neyn reveals that when she had met her doppelgänger counterpart on Earth (Fuyumi's mother) years ago, she merged with her, making Fuyumi and Bell sisters. Staz meets Bell's father, Heads Hydra, who asks Staz what he plans to do with Fuyumi if she becomes a human again, now that he knows her connection to the demon world. Heads has Staz promise two conditions on being with Fuyumi: to ask her permission whenever he wants to take her anywhere and to ask her permission whenever he wants to drink her blood. After Staz agrees to it, he releases Staz and Bell, but Neyn unleashes a group of assassins called Team Fearless to hunt down Staz.
7	August 31, 2012	978-4-04-120412-2	February 18, 2014	978-0-31-636905-3
31. A Very Thick Solution; 32. The Leader Reader; 33. So She Was in There; 34. Professor Proverb Arrives; 35. A Summons to Demon World Acropolis
As Staz and Fuyumi leave the Dimensional Highway, Shamkid of Team Fearless spies on them as a cat. He and the team then attack Staz and kidnap Fuyumi, but Staz is able to fight back and defeat the team. They get a ride to the area bordering Acropolis where Staz is able to beat the border guard. Meanwhile, Bell helps Wolf find his mother Katy, who is living on Earth. Katy refuses to return to the demon world, but agrees to train Wolf on his powers.
8	April 2, 2013	978-4-04-120700-0	February 18, 2014	978-0-31-636905-3
36. Break into the Acropolis Caves!; 37. Experience Adult Relaxation!; 38. Start the Kids' Car!; 39. Rekindle Those Ten-Year-Old Feelings!; 40. Meet on That Day, at That Hour, at That Place!
Beros and Goyle are looking after Liz, when they get notice that there are some intruders who have breached the Acropolis border. Staz and Fuyumi sneak into the labyrinth-like Acropolis Caves shopping district but encounter Beros, who is able to stop them. Liz takes Fuyumi into Acropolis, but Staz's body tumbles out of the cart and he is left with Beros and Goyle. Meanwhile, Braz has resurrected his father Richarz using Akim's heart. Braz and Richarz meet Liz and Fuyumi, and with preparations in place, Braz goes out to Beros and Goyle and they take Braz and Staz to Acropolis. Heads takes Richarz to meet Wolf Daddy who is ready to fight Richarz to defend his throne.
9	September 2, 2013	978-4-04-120733-8	July 22, 2014	978-0-31-637672-3
41. Heart-wrenching Memories; 42. Behind the Door; 43. Hello, Good-bye; 44. Trueblood, True Power; 45. Bad Coaster
Richarz and Wolf Daddy test each other's strengths and then, realizing they are as powerful as they have always been, decide not to fight each other for the throne after all. Richardz stabs Braz and Staz in their hearts with an artifact that sends them to a near-death dimension. Braz and Staz learn that the imbalance of demon essence and human essence has resulted in the old king Herrschaft Grimm having too much power, and that Grimm was kept behind a door for ten years. Akim takes control of his body and grabs the heart that was in Richarz's. Wolf tries to fight Akim with his newly realized powers that Katy trained him, but Akim then absorbs Grimm's power and destroys the door.
10	December 28, 2013	978-4-04-120945-5	July 22, 2014	978-0-31-637672-3
46. Blood Communication; 47. Why We're Coming to the Manga World; 48. Why Even the Manga World Isn't That Easy; 49. Blood Bank's Heart-pounding Emotion; 50. Departure! Assassin! Demon World North!
With Braz's help, Akim declares himself king of the Demon World. Wolf Daddy, Heads, and Neyn think the demons now view Akim as a villain instead of a king. Wolf Daddy leaves it to their younger generation to figure out how to depose Akim. Staz suggests reading through his manga collection from the human world, as those things the humans think are fantasy are based on memories and experiences from the demon world, and the tropes listed there could have strategies to defeat Akim. Beros gets an idea of looking for an artifact, while Wolf thinks the gang needs more training. Bell is worried that Fuyumi is spending so much intimate time with Staz that she gets depressed. Neyn has Team Fearless keep tabs on Akim. Meanwhile, Akim gathers parts from all would-be challengers to become even stronger, and Braz develops an instrument that quantifies Akim's power, bringing in Frank N. Stein for further research. Akim creates demon girls Kelly and Burgundy to gather parts.
11	May 2, 2014	978-4-04-121115-1	May 19, 2015	978-0-31-634206-3
51. A Girl's Heart, Fickle as Demon World Skies; 52. Important Parts; 53. The Old Soldiers' Network; 54. Don't Think. Feel!; 55. The Blacklist
Beros and Goyle go in search of the legendary bass guitar artifact. Staz and Wolf travel to Demon World North, bringing Fuyumi, Liz, and Knell who hang inside Knell's portal space. They find that Demon World North has been ravaged by Burgundy, who has been competing with Kelly to find the best parts for Akim. Burgundy wants Fuyumi's breasts, but Staz grabs Fuyumi and hides in Knell's portal space. An old man arrives and causes the two demon girls to retreat. The man is White Step, an old colleague of Wolf Daddy, who is actually a human with incredible dodging skills. He agrees to train Wolf and Staz. Meanwhile, Team Fearless work as part of Akim's elite guard, acting as servants and cooks. Bell is still sulking over her inability to win Staz's affection, so Katy gives her some romance advice. Wolf Daddy prepares to offer Akim a blacklist of some of the most powerful demons so that Akim won't destroy the entire Demon World.
12	November 4, 2014	978-4-04-101675-6	May 19, 2015	978-0-31-634206-3
56. Request to Kill; 57. Battlefield; 58. Sympathy for the Instructor; 59. The Tengu Festival Begins!; 60. Top Secret
Wolf Daddy offers to deliver the blacklist demons to Akim on the condition that Akim stop his hunting. Akim agrees to a cease fire for three weeks. Staz and Wolf train with Pati. Akim and the two demon girls blast out a battlefield area in Demon World North. Burgundy finds Pati and White Step, but does not attack them because of the cease fire. Bell takes over for White Step in training Staz and Wolf, and having them dodge attacks from Liz who is wearing a tengu mask. She later proposes a game where Staz has to unmask Bell before he gets hit ten times, but when Staz is about to win the challenge, Liz teleports him to a secluded area and confesses to him that she likes him. Akim creates another demon called Amber to go against Kelly.
13	March 4, 2015	978-4-04-101676-3	February 23, 2016	978-0-31-626912-4
61. The Moment of Confrontation; 62. The World Is Full of Monsters; 63. Choosing Their Own Paths; 64. The World of the Weak; 65. The Enchanted Bass, Dead Resort
Bell tells Staz again that she likes him in a romantic way, but realizes that it is because she likes how passionate he is about protecting Fuyumi. Jack and Doji continue sparring in prepare for their fights against Akim and his minions. After being able to successfully dodge White Step's hired killer trainer, Bell has Staz and Wolf proceed to their original destination in Demon World North, climbing a hiking trail in weighted uniforms. In the next challenge involving hunting for ingredients for a meal, Staz and Fuyumi are surprised by a giant boar, but are too fatigued to fight it. Meanwhile, Pati tries to show Kelly how friendship is better than killing, although White Step has his reservations. Braz and Team Fearless get a sample of Akim's hair so they can analyze it for weakness and look for ways to administer a poison. Beros and Goyle acquire the legendary guitar artifact, but is underwhelmed by its ability.
14	August 4, 2015	978-4-04-103327-2	February 23, 2016	978-0-31-626912-4
66. Time to Unite; 67. Freed; 68. The Fourth Blacklisted; 69. Evil Potato Reborn!; 70. Showdown
Shamkid analyzes Akim's hairs and finds more of Grimm's presence. Braz tells Akim his results, but realizes that Akim has already lost his identity to Grimm, who dares him to make a poison for him to drink anyway. Neyn has a talk with the blacklisted trio and they start functioning more with a purpose. Staz and the gang do one more challenge to head to the destination at Demon World North in their weighted uniforms, only to find it is White Step's second home and that White Step has been staying there with Pati and Burgundy. White Step lets Burgundy fight Staz and Wolf, but Pati pulls Burgundy away. The day of the big fight, Braz gives Akim his own blood as the poison.
15	December 29, 2015	978-4-04-103328-9	March 21, 2017	978-0-31-646922-7
71. Don't Stop "We" Now!; 72. Sing in the "Pain"; 73. "Dead" It Be; 74. "Fake" on Me; 75. Yes "Daddy," Once More
16	July 4, 2016	978-4-04-104423-0	March 21, 2017	978-0-31-646922-7
76. Confusion, Chaos, Contamination; 77. She Could Taste Blood; 78. The Giant Robot He Always Wanted; 79. Fuyumi Yanagi the Demon; 80. The Most Selfish Guy in the Demon World
17	December 31, 2016	978-4-04-104424-7	August 22, 2017	978-0-31-647392-7
81. The Demon World Rocks; 82. Adrift; 83. True Feelings; 84. Blood Lad; 85. The Human World

==== Bloody Brat ====
No.	Original release date	Original ISBN	English release date	English ISBN
1	August 31, 2012	978-4-04-120406-1	March 25, 2014	978-0-31-637046-2
2	July 2, 2013	978-4-04-120772-7	October 28, 2014	978-0-31-629488-1

=== Anime ===
The anime is produced by Brain's Base and directed by Shigeyuki Miya, with series composition by Takeshi Konuta, character designs by Kenji Fujisaki, art direction by Masaki Mayuzumi and Toshiyuki Sakae and sound direction by Satoki Iida. The 10-episode series began airing on July 7, 2013, on tvk and were later aired on Tokyo MX, Sun TV and BS11. The series has been licensed in North America by Viz Media for streaming on their online service Viz Anime, which was revealed at Anime Expo 2013 along with streaming by Neon Alley and home video release in 2014. The opening theme is "ViViD" by May'n whilst the ending theme is "Bloody Holic" by Yuuka Nanri.

== Reception ==
The manga had sold over 1.8 million copies as of March 2015. Spick Mich from Spickmich reviewed the German version of Blood Lad, stating that the manga's art style occasionally reminded him of Soul Eater and that fans of action and horror would like the series. Bamboo Dong from Anime News Network praised the anime adaptation, finding its humor appealing as well as the portrayal of the main character Staz.

== Works cited ==
- "Ch." and "Vol." is shortened form for chapter and volume of the collected Blood Lad manga. Volume numbering follows the Japanese version and not the omnibus one.
- "Ep." is shortened form for episode and refers to an episode number of the collected Blood Lad anime.
