= Kenji Roa =

Japanese voice actor and singer

- ロア 健治
- Born: January 25, 1979 (age 47)
- Occupations: Voice actor, singer
- Years active: 1996–present
- Website: virgil-web.com

Kenji Roa (ロア健治, Roa Kenji; born January 25, 1979) is a Japanese voice actor and singer who is a vocalist in the Japanese rock band Virgil. He also voices Tobi in Blood Lad.
