= List of Honey and Clover characters =

This is a list of characters of the manga series Honey and Clover written and illustrated by Chika Umino. It was published by Shueisha from June 2000 to July 2006 and collected in 10 tankōbon volumes. It follows the lives and relationships of five students at a Tokyo art college, three of whom live in the same apartment building.

== Main characters ==
Hagumi Hanamoto (花本 はぐみ, Hanamoto Hagumi)
Portrayed by: Haruka Kudō (anime, Japanese), Heather Halley (anime, English), Yū Aoi (movie), Riko Narumi (Japanese TV drama)

A supremely gifted artist, Hagu's immense talents are esteemed by all who witness her works, catching the eye of numerous professional artists who insistently urge her to submit her work to exhibitions to heighten her publicity (which she seems to find daunting). She is 18 years of age at the beginning of the series and her appearance is that of a child, and she conveniently behaves as one. Raised in a largely sheltered and obscure home by her irritable grandmother, her sociability is below average. It is while living in that home that Hagu develops her skill in drawing and painting, her only pastime, though she finds nothing to sketch save for the never-changing view she has from her porch, varying only in seasons. Hagu is from Azumino city, Nagano-ken. She is introduced to Takemoto, Morita and Mayama by Shūji, her father's cousin and also a professor at the college. Upon seeing her, Morita and Takemoto fall in love with her, though both express it in different ways. Hagu knows not of their feelings towards her, but sees them as friends. However, Morita expresses his love for her in very odd ways, and Hagu is often seen trying to escape from whatever shenanigan Morita has planned for her. Though later Hagu develops feelings towards Morita, although she does not at first realize this, as Shūji points out. Hagu is very shy, and because she is so nervous when interacting with people, the other art students think that she is strange. Hagu doesn't seem to be too close with family members either, with the exception of Shūji, whom she fondly calls "Shū-chan". However, as the series progresses, Hagu is able to become closer friends with Takemoto, Mayama, Morita and Yamada. When Shūji leaves to go do a research project in Mongolia, Hagu forms a deeper bond with each of them, essentially seeing them as a sort of family. Hagu lives with Yamada (whom she calls "Ayu") when Shūji is away and they become very close friends. During parties, she is seen to be crying because of her envy of Yamada's beautiful legs and beautiful breasts. Mayama tries very hard to comfort her but failing rather miserably saying that "You'll have one of those when you're older....probably". While Hagu is crying, Morita is also crying because of her infectious tears. Later in the series, Hagu started to avoid Takemoto after he confessed his feelings for her, but at the end when he was leaving on the bullet train she gave him bread with honey and four leaf clovers, proving that she considered him a precious friend. At the end of the series, Hagu accepts Morita's confession of love and quickly realizes his intentions. Begging him not to run away and promising to always watch him, she returns to Shūji to complete her rehab. Mayama said that there are people who pursue love, and there are ones who choose passion. Hagu seems to be the second type. Moreover, Shūji is a very important person to Hagu and is "like a rain that soothes her". Hagu is often troubled by the thought that she's a burden to Shūji.

Yūta Takemoto (竹本 祐太, Takemoto Yūta)
Portrayed by: Hiroshi Kamiya (anime, Japanese), Yuri Lowenthal (anime, English), Shō Sakurai (movie), Toma Ikuta (Japanese TV drama)

Aged 19 (at the beginning of the series), Yūta Takemoto is a second-year student at the art college. He is from Annaka city, Gunma-ken. He lives in the same apartment complex as Mayama and Morita in room 202. His floor mates are Morita and Hasegawa. Takemoto studies architecture, but has little certainty as to what he wishes to do upon graduating; his decision to attend art college was because he liked to build things with his hands, like he had with his father. Takemoto is one of the more mellow characters in the series. He falls in love with Hagu immediately after being introduced by his professor and keeps his feelings to himself throughout most of the series. His love for Hagu and his inability to act upon his feelings as freely as Morita causes some internal problems for Takemoto. For example, when Hagu received a bird brooch that was made for her as an anonymous present, Takemoto couldn't bring himself to say that Morita was the one who had made it for her. Instead of acting on his feelings, Takemoto decides to be more of a brother figure to Hagu, giving her friendly support when needed. For example, Takemoto accepts Hagu's requests to build her sophisticated dollhouses and the like. Takemoto is very close to her. His relationship with his family also contributes to his mellow mood. His father died when he was still young. Also, his mother works at a hospital as a nurse, so Takemoto would usually spend a lot of his time there, even his Christmas holidays. Furthermore, Takemoto is uncomfortable with his mother's new husband, an outspoken man whose persona seems to a polar opposite to that of his father. However, Takemoto tries to get used to his company and tries to accept the fact that his step-father is capable of looking after his mother, since Takemoto has worried about his mother's well-being ever since he left home. His mother's remarriage and her assurance that he is now free to do as he wishes instead of taking care of her all the time later influenced Takemoto's decision to attend art college. Later in the series Takemoto has to stay another year due to getting a stomach ulcer and not being able to complete his graduation thesis. Near the end of the first season, Takemoto goes on a journey across Japan on a bicycle, meeting several people on the way, including a group in Zuigan-ji in Matsushima which is involved in the renovating of ancient Japanese structures and buildings all around the country (which he wishes to join), finally reaching Cape Sōya in Wakkanai, Hokkaidō. After arriving back to Tokyo, he finally confesses his feelings for Hagu though he knew from the start that his feelings for her were unrequited. At the end of the manga, he chose to work with the renovating team he had met and left for Morioka.

Shinobu Morita (森田 忍, Morita Shinobu)
Portrayed by: Yūji Ueda (anime, Japanese), Sam Riegel (anime, English), Yūsuke Iseya (movie), Hiroki Narimiya (Japanese TV drama)

24 years old and a 6th year student in the beginning of the series, Morita occupies room 203, his floor mates being Takemoto and Hasegawa. Morita is unable to graduate, as he can never wake up on time to go to classes. This is mainly due to the work that he does, which forces him to go missing for periods of time. What he does for work though remains a mystery. When Morita comes back from his mysterious job, he immediately falls asleep for at least 48 hours, due to the amount of work he does. He also returns with a large sum of money in his back-pocket and brings a food item to share with his flat mates. Although the flat mates believe he does it to mock them, such as when he brings a bag of croquettes instead of meat, Morita does care deeply for his friends such as Takemoto. Despite being pretty weird sometimes, Morita is extremely smart and talented, showing talent in many fields from a young age such as creating toys, sculpture, drawing, playing musical instruments, and especially CG effects (which is exploited by Peter Lucas). Though he often appears to be childish and playful, he's actually a very thoughtful person, often gives advice and consolation to his friends, mostly Yamada. He also used his crazy methods to rescue his friends from difficult or embarrassing situation (like the Yamada-Mayama related cases). Morita is a very mysterious person. He does many random, crazy things for his personal enjoyment, such as creating a twister game with too many colors, which resulted in horrific pain for him and Takemoto. Morita is a perceptive individual, but tactless and often states the truth, such as how Mayama secretly stalks Rika outside her apartment, when nobody wants to hear it. He also expresses his love for Hagu in weird and quirky ways, such as forcing Hagu to dress up as a mouse. Morita's obsession with Hagu stems from a fondness of cute things during his childhood, such as causing a cat to become neurotic after cuddling it too much. As a result of Morita's obsession Hagu becomes afraid of him and tries to avoid him but eventually falls in love with him later on. Despite the way Morita treats Hagu he sincerely cares for Hagu, getting her a pair of expensive mules and creating a brooch with a dove on it, both of which was in her scrapbook of things she wanted. Later in the series, Morita leaves for America for work without saying anything to his friends. He eventually returns in about a year's time, and Morita's friends finally discover what he does for his work, being awarded best CGI in the Mocademy Awards (a spoof of the Academy Awards) for the movie 'Space Titanic', after studying with acclaimed director Peter Lucas. Morita's room, which no one had ever been inside, had also been discovered after his departure, and contained a lot of high tech equipment. After returning from America, Morita finally manages to graduate from his course in his 8th year handing his work in on the very last day. Despite graduating and becoming rich from his work in America, Morita applies for a Japanese Arts course believing he hasn't studied for long enough, even though he's been there for 8 years. He re-enters the art school as a 3rd grade student, having already completed half the subjects. From the last chapters of the series, we find out that Morita has been earning money all along to help his brother Kaoru get revenge on a company who ruined his father's company by foul methods. Morita doesn't want this revenge from the bottom of his heart, but did so because of his brother and the former faithful employers of his late father. Hearing Hagu's accident, he rushed back to see her. Looking to her as an escape, he said that it was absurd thinking life only means something if you leave work behind. Morita also finally confesses his love for her. Hagu reciprocated his feelings, but sees through his intentions, begging him not to run away. Promising to always watch over him, Hagu returns to Shūji and her rehab because she cannot imagine her life without drawing. Later, Morita decides to work in Peter Lucas's company.

Takumi Mayama (真山 巧, Mayama Takumi)
Portrayed by: Tomokazu Sugita (anime, Japanese), Cam Clarke (anime, English), Ryō Kase (movie), Osamu Mukai (Japanese TV drama)

22 years old and a 4th year student at the start of the series, Mayama is from Kanazawa, Ishikawa-ken and an architecture student at the art institute. He lives in the same complex as Takemoto and Morita. He occupies room 101, sharing the floor with an unknown individual and formerly Lohmeyer-senpai. He acts as a senior to Takemoto and tries to help Morita get up for early morning classes. At one point, Takemoto and Morita are seen sleeping alongside him in his futon. Morita also borrows Mayama's shirts from time to time because it's more comfortable. Mayama also used to help Rika out with various errands while Rika was disabled due to the accident that left her husband dead. It is during that time that Mayama develops feelings for Rika. It is unknown whether Rika fully reciprocates the feelings that Mayama has for her, but various flashbacks imply that Mayama and Rika have 'fooled around', or Mayama took advantage of Rika's disability to fulfill his desires, although this is cleared up later as not being the case. Rika suggested that Mayama find another job so that she wouldn't have to continue hurting him, as she realizes how much he cares for her, and is unable (and perhaps unwilling at that point) to allow him to enter into her life. Mayama eventually landed a job at Fujiwara Design. He has to deal with coworkers that are also very interested in his love life, and make comments whenever they can. Mayama also has to keep watch of his boss, Nomiya, whom he considers to be a playboy, when Nomiya begins to take an interest in Yamada. Mayama doesn't return the feelings that Yamada has for him, but he sees Yamada as his close friend. Yamada's innocence is one thing that Mayama has to constantly guard from Nomiya, who has developed an interest with her. When Fujiwara Design later broke up, people had to either stay in the Tokyo branch or transfer to the Tottori branch. Nomiya arranged for Mayama to be transfer to the Tottori branch, but as soon as this was announced Mayama quit. He now works again with Rika at her company, Harada Design, after forcing himself into the position in his own way. Mayama's character design is based upon Suga Shikao.

Ayumi Yamada (山田 あゆみ, Yamada Ayumi)
Portrayed by: Mikako Takahashi (anime, Japanese), Julie Ann Taylor (anime, English), Megumi Seki (movie), Natsuki Harada (Japanese TV drama)

21 years old at the beginning, Yamada is well known by her peers at the art college. First, she is good at pottery, and second, she is nicknamed Tetsujin (lit. Iron-lady) for running 6km to school every morning with her dog during freshman year in order to help the dog lose weight. Due to her good looks, she also catches the attention of her male friends/coworkers at the shopping district she works with. She and Hagu seem to be very close, like siblings. While Hagu addresses the three young men by their last names, she calls Yamada by her first name. Yamada really cares for Hagu like a younger sister. She offers to stay with her while Shuji is gone and they get along extremely well, especially as they share an equally unique taste in cooking that is inedible to anyone else but themselves. Although not shown as much as her relationship with Hagu, she is close friends with Takemoto and Morita. Nomiya once said that though Yamada has the look of a fully matured girl, she's actually a "baby" inside. Yamada is innocent, and cares deeply for her friends. She's also very good at martial arts. Yamada and Hagu often create together many bizarre dishes (like curry with chocolate and so on), and Mayama, Takemoto, Morita and Shūji are the victims of these dishes in most of the cases. Yamada is deeply in love with one of her friends, Mayama. Mayama, however, doesn't return her feelings, asking her why she is in love with him and encouraging her to go find someone else. Even though Yamada recognizes that her love will bear no fruit, she continues to love him. She can't manage to move on and find another man. While Mayama doesn't love her in that sense, Mayama sees Yamada as an important friend, a feeling that Yamada recognizes later on when she cannot return the love of her coworkers, but still thought of them as her precious friends. Mayama's over protectiveness of her causes Yamada to get angry at him whenever he tries to protect her from his former boss, Nomiya. Later in the series, Yamada decides to continue as a graduate student at the art college. Furthermore, she also makes pottery for Fujiwara and Harada Design. It is revealed in author's next manga March Comes in Like a Lion that she is happily married to Nomiya.

== Secondary characters ==
Shūji Hanamoto (花本 修司, Hanamoto Shūji)
Portrayed by: Keiji Fujiwara (anime, Japanese), Chris Kent (anime, English), Masato Sakai (movie), Jun Murakami (Japanese TV drama)

Shūji is a professor at the college that Morita, Mayama, Takemoto, Yamada, and Hagu attend, serving as the father figure for the group. He is also Hagu's relative (he is her father's cousin; although it is not clarified if he is her father's 1st, 2nd, or 3rd cousin) and the person that Hagu is really closest to, and gets very overprotective of her at times. Shūji is a close friend of Rika and her late husband, who had been his roommate until Rika and her husband married. Unlike his friends, Shūji's artistic talent was not remarkably impressive, but found he was good at explaining things like art history and anatomy (subjects which Harada and Rika struggled with) and eventually decided to become a teacher as a result. When Rika's husband died in a traffic accident, he took care of Rika so that she wouldn't try and join her husband in death, but Shūji begins to wonder if Rika would've been happier if she died alongside her husband. Because of this, Shūji recommends Mayama as Rika's new assistant; he believed Mayama's companionship would be a healthy change for Rika. Shūji is a mellow and thoughtful person, partly because he's older and more experienced than other characters. He bears deep feelings for Hagu, always stays by her side and help her. When Hagu got into the accident and may lose her ability to pursue art, he risked everything for her, including quietly resigning from his position at the college so he'll be available for all of Hagu's needs. When he finds entire box of money from Morita to help with Hagu's rehab, Shūji is goaded by Morita into shouting an admission from an open window that his feelings for Hagu were that "I love her! I really love her a lot." When Hagu reveals that she is determined to recover but asks him to dedicate his life to her, even if she can't pay it all back, Shūji agrees without hesitation and tells her she doesn't need to pay him back for anything.

Rika Harada (原田 理花, Harada Rika)
Voiced by: Sayaka Ohara (Japanese); L.C. Curci (English)

Rika is the founder and manager of Harada Design. She also ran it with her husband until he died in a car accident that happened on the opening night of one of the stores they designed. This accident also left her badly scarred on her back, and has damaged her legs so she is unable to walk for long periods without the help of a cane and medicine. During college, Rika Egami (江上 理花, Egami Rika) had been known for being a talented artist, but also very cold and aloof. Harada, Rika's eventual husband, befriended her and she began to live in the apartment Harada and Shūji shared. The three were very close friends and continued to live together until Harada and Rika got married and founded Harada Design. She is from the city of Otaru in Hokkaidō. When Professor Hanamoto believes that his presence will hinder Rika's recovery, he sends Mayama to help her, believing that Mayama would be the least likely to intrude on other people's business. However, as Mayama tends to Rika's injuries, he develops feelings for her. Rika knows that Mayama likes her, but pushes Mayama away because she doesn't want to hurt him. It was unclear whether Rika reciprocates the feelings that Mayama has for her, but later chapters of the manga and the first episodes of the second series seem to imply that she does. Later in the series, it appears that Rika finally opens her heart to Mayama after a shock ending sequence where Mayama's feelings finally flood out.

Kaoru Morita (森田馨, Morita Kaoru)
Voiced by: Takuma Takewaka (Japanese); Patrick Seitz (English)

Morita's older brother who seems to have a mysterious agenda in earning ridiculously large amounts of money. It is later revealed that he and Morita are working together to buy back his father's company which was purchased by an electrical company when they were kids. Unlike Morita, he is practical-minded and organized. He appears to be one of the few people who can put up with Morita's quirky idiosyncrasies and is able to control Morita to some extent. Kaoru shares a deep relationship with Morita, but sometimes feels envious and inferior towards Morita's talents.

Takumi Nomiya (野宮 匠, Nomiya Takumi)
Voiced by: Kenji Hamada (Japanese); Tom Gibis (English)

Nomiya is Mayama's former boss at Fujiwara Design. He is described as handsome, intelligent and somewhat workaholic. He, along with Yamazaki and Miwako, is first introduced on episode 14 of season 1, as part of Fujiwara Architects, a prominent design firm. Mayama is somewhat adverse to him, partially because he sees Nomiya as the ideal professional he wants to become and dislikes the comparison and also because of Nomiya's interest in Yamada. According to Mayama, Nomiya is the type of guy who could "throw a cellphone in the sea full of women's numbers, without caring at all." Though he's deemed by Mayama as a playboy, and is actually quite experienced with women, he falls in love with Yamada. He tries to visit her whenever he can, although he is aware of Yamada's feelings for Mayama. Mayama tries to act as the middleman as much as he can in order to protect Yamada, as he doubts the sincerity of Nomiya's feelings. However, Mayama finally gives in, realizing that Nomiya "isn't as evil as he thought". In another Chica Umino's manga, March Comes in Like a Lion, it's revealed that Nomiya and Yamada married.

== Minor characters ==
Kazushi Yamazaki (山崎一志, Yamazaki Kazushi)
Voiced by: Hiroshi Tsuchida (Japanese); Keith Silverstein (English)

Yamazaki is an employee at Fujiwara Design along with Nomiya and Miwako. He is romantically interested in his co-worker Miwako, but so far his love is unrequited. Yamazaki is somewhat shy around women, since he attended an all-boys high school and did not have the opportunity to meet many female students when he studied engineering in college.

Miwako Teshigawara (勅使河原美和子, Teshigawara Miwako)
Voiced by: Michiko Neya (Japanese); Stephanie Sheh (English)

Miwako is another employee at Fujiwara Design along with Nomiya and Yamazaki. She owns a dog named Leader. She enjoys teasing her co-workers to an extreme extent and has been described as someone who takes advantage of others like an old woman would. Miwako is a big fan of Rika's work and also enjoys going to the health spa to relax.

Leader (リーダー, Rīdā)

Miwako's dog, seen mostly in her presence. Although essentially a minor character, Leader exceeds other minor character colleagues in registering noteworthy impressions by responding when addressed and often remarking on the behavior or accounts of others.

Mitsuko Aida (合田美津子, Aida Mitsuko)

Takemoto's mother. Works as a nurse. She remarried when Takemoto finished junior high school. Like Takemoto, she has a tendency not to ask people for help because she does not want to burden them with her troubles.

Kazuo Aida (合田稼頭男, Aida Kazuo)
Voiced by: Kenta Miyake (Japanese); Keith Silverstein (English)

Takemoto's stepfather. He is an affable and loud man, but Takemoto has difficulty getting used to him because of how different Kazuo is from his father. Kazuo often means well, but is not terribly articulate and usually tries to use his actions to express what he means. He and his family accept both Takemoto and his mother as part of their family, though Takemoto still feels as though he does not belong. Because Takemoto and his mother have an unconscious tendency to avoid relying on others, Kazuo is somewhat frustrated that they don't seem to trust that he will help them. He tells them after Takemoto falls ill and is hospitalized before he is able to graduate; Takemoto openly asks if Kazuo would be able to help him with expenditures since Takemoto will need to attend school for another year, which Kazuo happily agrees to.

Kazuhiko Hasegawa (長谷川一彦, Hasegawa Kazuhiko)
Voiced by: Hirofumi Nojima (Japanese); Patrick Seitz (English)

Hasegawa occupies room 201 of the apartment that Takemoto, Mayama and Morita currently live in. His floor mates are Takemoto and Morita. After he graduates, he takes over his family's noodle making business and opens a restaurant next door to the factory, as well as using his art skills to make pottery to sell at the restaurant. Hasegawa becomes very successful and his restaurant is very popular for tourists and is also mentioned in some guidebooks.

Ippei Matsumoto (松本一平, Matsumoto Ippei)
Voiced by: Tokuyoshi Kawashima (Japanese); Kyle Hebert (English)

One of Yamada's childhood friends from the Hamadayama shopping district where she grew up, he is the owner of a bakery and has employed Yamada and Hagu to help with promotions. While most of Yamada's male childhood friends had hoped for years without confessing to her directly that she would return their feelings, Ippei quietly accepted any feelings he had would be unrequited. As a result, he often would console and reason with their other friends each time they became upset at the possibility that Yamada would find someone else to love, including after she rejected five of them when they all proposed to her at the same time. In a post-series spinoff chapter, when it became clear that Yamada would likely end up dating Nomiya, Ippei is saddened at the idea that Yamada would no longer always be living at the Hamadayama shopping district. Yamada's aunt, Akiko, introduces him to Sakura Misono, the most eligible young woman from the Koenji shopping district who owns a family cake shop. They find they are compatible, being able to respect each other's love for the respective shopping districts where they grew up and the desire to maintain separate shops. Ippei and Sakura decide to marry and Yamada and the rest of their childhood friends arrange a display of sakura flowers at the shrine in November as a surprise for the new couple for their wedding.

Professor Tange (丹下先生, Tange-sensei)
Voiced by: Masashi Hirose

A professor emeritus of sculpture at the art institute everyone attends, elderly Tange-sensei is a long suffering supervisor to Morita. Recognizing Morita's genius, Tange makes the mistake of taking Morita seriously and constantly finds himself stressed out while trying to control Morita. Tange's greatest desire is to get Morita to finish his graduation project (and with Morita's talent, it means refusing to accept unfinished works) so that he may retire in peace. When Morita is finally completes his graduation project, Tange expresses bittersweet sentiments towards the role of teacher. Despite constantly upsetting Tange, Morita greatly appreciates and respects Tange for all that he has done for Morita in their eight years together. After Morita graduates and then re-enrolls as a third year student, Morita transfers his attention to Okina Nakamori (中森 翁, Nakamori Okina), the professor emeritus of Classical Japanese painting.

Professor Shōda (庄田先生, Shōda-sensei)
Voiced by: Mugihito (Japanese); Patrick Seitz (English)

Another elderly teacher at the art institute that every attends, Shōda is Yamada's supervising instructor and an extremely avid admirer of her work, along with her "Iron Lady" fans. He is especially impressed with Yamada's graduation project, a beautifully thrown and large bowl, to point of weeping tears of joy and expresses the same reaction when she creates a similar and equally large bowl post-graduation. After Yamada graduates, she decides to continue studying with Shōda as a post-graduate student until she can find a job.

Professor Yumi Kōda (幸田由美先生, Kōda Yumi-sensei)
Voiced by: Natsuki Mori

A well-intentioned senior professor at the art institute that everyone attends and a supervising instructor of Hagu. As an artist, she struggled to become a painter who would be recognized in Paris, but was ultimately unsuccessful. As a result, she does not want Hagu's talents to fall into obscurity and wants Hagu to develop as an artist by experiencing different cultures.

Asai (浅井)
Voiced by: Motomu Kiyokawa (Japanese); Kyle Hebert (English)

The president of Artcraft, a design company, Mr. Asai is an elderly gentleman about fifty years of age. He is a friend of Rika's and an acquaintance of both Professor Hanamoto and Mayama. After Mayama is hired by Fujiwara Design, Rika works with Asai, who is able to fill the role her husband once did as a social intermediary for her work. However, because of Mr. Asai's age, many of Rika's friends and acquaintances worry that she will not be able to continue depending on Mr. Asai for a long time.

Lohmeyer-senpai (ローマイヤ先輩, Rōmaiya-senpai)
Voiced by: Kyle Hebert

A largely absent dorm-mate of the others. A burly, large, buff and kind-hearted giant of an individual, 'Lohmeyer-senpai' (as he is yearningly referred to), is a man of men's dreams (Mayama questions his devotion to Rika at one point). He is the series' taboo response to the age-old inquiry that if strong and able men are the source of security to women, then who is the source of security to men? (stronger, bigger and even more able men). He often returns with a substantial amount of meat for the others, an almost symbolic gesture of his manliness and ability to provide. He worked part time as Nyanzaburou the mascot for an amusement park which upped the charts on visitors. Because of his father's condition, he is often away from his apartment, to the misfortune of its male residents.

== See also ==
- List of Honey and Clover episodes
