= Hattori =

- Language: Japanese

Hattori (服部) is a surname of Japanese origins.

== Notable people ==
- Akio Hattori (服部 晶夫; 1929–2013), Japanese mathematician
- Daiki Hattori (服部 大樹; born 1987), Japanese footballer
- Eriko Hattori, American painter of Japanese heritage
- Fuyuki Hattori (服部 冬樹; born 1955), Japanese photographer
- Kazutada Hattori (服部 一忠; died 1595), Japanese samurai
- Katsuhisa Hattori (服部 克久; 1936–2020), Japanese classical composer
- Katsura Hattori (服部 桂; born 1951), Japanese editor
- Mitsuru Hattori (はっとりみつる; born 1977), manga artist
- Moné Hattori (服部 百音; born 1999), Japanese classical violinist
- Naoki Hattori (服部 尚貴; born 1966), Japanese racing driver and journalist
- Nobuo Hattori (服部 信雄; born 1947), Japanese basketball player
- Shigeaki Hattori (服部 茂章; 1963–2025), Japanese racing driver
- Takushiro Hattori (服部 卓四郎; 1901–1960), Imperial Japanese Army officer
- Tomosada Hattori (服部 友貞; died 1568), Japanese samurai
- Toshihiro Hattori (服部 年宏; born 1973), Japanese footballer
- Yūji Hattori (服部 祐兒; 1960–2025), Japanese Sumo wrestler
- Yukio Hattori (服部 幸應; born 1945), Japanese television personality
- Yoshihiro Hattori (服部 剛丈; 1975–1992), a Japanese student shot and killed in Baton Rouge, Louisiana, United States
- Yoshio Hattori (服部 敬雄; 1899–1991), Japanese businessman
- Kintarō Hattori (服部 金太郎; 1860–1934), Japanese businessman and watchmaker, founder of Seiko

== Fictional characters ==
- Heiji Hattori (服部 平次), a character from the Japanese manga series Case Closed (Detective Conan)
- Ninja Hattori-kun, a Japanese manga series written and illustrated by duo Fujiko Fujio
- Akira Hattori and Yujiro Hattori, two fictional Weekly Shōnen Jump editors from the Japanese manga series Bakuman

== Other uses ==
- Hattori Hanzō (disambiguation)
- Hattori–Stong theorem
- Hattori Nutrition College, a cooking school in Tokyo
- Hattori Racing Enterprises, a NASCAR team
- Hattori Ryokuchi Park in Osaka
- Hattori Shoten, a Tokyo-based publisher, an early publisher of Natsume Sōseki's I Am a Cat in English and Japanese.
- K. Hattori, a shop
