= Fuyuki =

- Pronunciation: fu-y(ú)-kí
- Gender: Male

Origin
- Origin: Japanese
- Meaning: It can have many different meanings depending on the kanji used.

Fuyuki (冬木、冬城、冬樹) is a masculine Japanese given name which is occasionally used as a surname and means wintry tree.

- Hiromichi Fuyuki (冬木 弘道) (born 1960), Japanese professional wrestler
- Fuyuki Hattori (服部 冬樹) (born 1955), Japanese photographer
- Fuyuki Yamakawa (山川 冬樹) (born 1973), Japanese performance artist

== In fiction ==
- In the Fate/ series, there is a fictional city called Fuyuki City. In which the entire series of Fate/Zero, Fate/stay night, Fate/hollow ataraxia, and Fate/kaleid liner PRISMA☆ILLYA all take place in.
