= Ashihara =

Ashihara (written: 芦原) is a Japanese surname. Notable people with the surname include:

- Hideyuki Ashihara (芦原 英幸, 1944–1995), Japanese karate school master
  - Ashihara kaikan, a school and style of karate founded by Hideyuki Ashihara
- Hinako Ashihara (芦原 妃名子), Japanese manga artist
- Yoshinobu Ashihara (芦原 義信, 1918–2003), Japanese architect
- Yoshishige Ashihara (芦原 義重, 1901–2003), Japanese businessman

== See also ==
- Ashihara no Nakatsukuni, in Japanese mythology, the world between Takamagahara (Heaven) and Yomi (Hell)
