= Hatori =

Hatori (written: 葉鳥 or 羽鳥) is a Japanese surname. Notable people with the surname include:

- Bisco Hatori (葉鳥 ビスコ) (born 1975), Japanese manga artist
- Miho Hatori (羽鳥 美保) (born 1970), Japanese singer-songwriter and musician
- Shinichi Hatori (羽鳥 慎) (born1971), Japanese television announcer

== See also ==
- Hatori Station (羽鳥駅, Hatori-eki), a train station in Omitama, Ibaraki Prefecture, Japan
- Hatori Dam (羽鳥ダム), a dam in Fukushima Prefecture, Japan
- Hattori
