= Yoshishige =

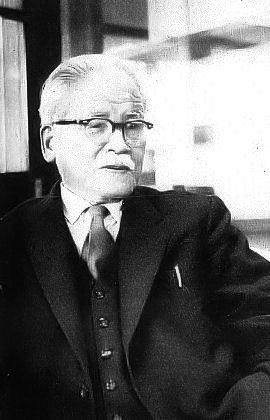
- Yoshishige Abe (1883–1966), Japanese philosopher, educator, and statesman
- Pronunciation: joɕiɕige (IPA)
- Gender: Male

Origin
- Origin: Japanese
- Meaning: Different meanings depending on the kanji used

Other names
- Alternative spelling: Yosisige (Kunrei-shiki) Yosisige (Nihon-shiki) Yoshishige (Hepburn)

Yoshishige is a masculine Japanese given name.

== Written forms ==
Yoshishige can be written using different combinations of kanji characters. Here are some examples:

- 義重, "justice, heavy"
- 義茂, "justice, luxuriant"
- 義繁, "justice, prosperous/complexity"
- 吉重, "good luck, heavy"
- 吉茂, "good luck, luxuriant"
- 吉繁, "good luck, prosperous/complexity"
- 善重, "virtuou, heavy"
- 善茂, "virtuous, luxuriant"
- 善繁, "virtuous, prosperous/complexity"
- 芳重, "virtuous/fragrant, heavy"
- 芳茂, "virtuous/fragrant, luxuriant"
- 良重, "good, heavy"
- 良茂, "good, luxuriant"
- 慶重, "congratulate, heavy"
- 由繁, "reason, prosperous/complexity
- 嘉重, "excellent, heavy"
- 喜繁, "rejoice, prosperous/complexity
- 好重, "good/like something, heavy"
- 能重, "capacity, heavy"

The name can also be written in hiragana よししげ or katakana ヨシシゲ.

== Notable people with the name ==
- Yoshishige Abe (安倍 能成, 1883–1966), Japanese philosopher, educator, and statesman
- Yoshishige Ashihara (芦原 義重; 1901–2003), Japanese businessman
- Yoshishige Shimatani (島谷 能成; 1952–), chairman of Toho
- Yoshishige Hachisuka (蜂須賀 至鎮; 1586–1620), Japanese daimyō
- Yoshishige Minamoto (源 義重; 1135–1202), Japanese samurai
- Yoshishige Saitō (斎藤 義重; 1904–2001), Japanese visual artist
- Yoshishige Satake (佐竹 義重; 1547–1612), Japanese daimyō
- Yoshishige Yamazaki (山崎 美成; 1796–1856), Japanese essayist and antiquarian
- Yoshishige Yoshida (吉田 喜重; 1933–2022), Japanese film director and screenwriter
