= Argento Soma =

Japanese anime television series

- アルジェントソーマ
- Genre: Adventure, Mecha, Military
- Created by: Hajime Yatate; Kazuyoshi Katayama
- Directed by: Kazuyoshi Katayama
- Music by: Katsuhisa Hattori
- Country of origin: Japan
- Original language: Japanese
- No. of episodes: 25

Production
- Producers: Hiroyuki Birukawa; Shinichiro Kobayashi; Keiichi Matsumura
- Production companies: Sunrise; Victor Entertainment

Original release
- Network: TV Tokyo
- Release: October 6, 2000 – March 22, 2001

Related
- Original video animation

Kodoku to kodoku
- Directed by: Kazuyoshi Katayama
- Written by: Hiroaki Kitajima
- Music by: Katsuhisa Hattori
- Studio: Sunrise
- Licensed by: AUS: Madman Entertainment; NA: Discotek Media
- Released: February 21, 2002
- Runtime: 25 minutes

Argento Soma (アルジェント ソーマ, Arujento Sōma; "The Silver Body") (stylized as ΑΠΗΕΝΤΟ ΣΟΜΑ (Note: The title is a misspelling of the Greek title, which is correctly spelled as ΑΡΓΈΝΤΟ ΣΏΜΑ)) is a Japanese anime TV series produced by Sunrise. It aired on TV Tokyo from October 6, 2000, to March 22, 2001, with the final episode, releasing direct-to-video.

The anime was originally licensed by Bandai Entertainment in North America before going out of print in 2012. Following the 2012 closure of Bandai Entertainment, Sunrise announced at Otakon 2013, that Sentai Filmworks has rescued Argento Soma, along with a handful of other former BEI titles.

On August 1, 2026, Discotek Media announced at Otakon that they will release the anime series on Blu-ray release in 2026.

== Plot ==
In an effort to learn more about metallic aliens that have been plaguing the planet for several years, Dr. Noguchi and his assistant, Maki Agata, try to bring to life a construct pieced together from several destroyed aliens. They recruit into the project Takuto Kaneshiro, Maki's boyfriend at the college they both attend, because of his talent for metallurgy. While Takuto is unhappy with Maki keeping secrets from him again, he reluctantly helps with the project. In the process of reviving the monster that Dr. Noguchi has aptly called Frank (short for Frankenstein's monster), unidentified soldiers invade the MORGUE facility and cut the power. This causes a power surge that brings Frank to life and causes an explosion that kills everyone in the facility except Takuto.

A mysterious man who calls himself "Mr. X" visits the emotionally and physically scarred Takuto in the hospital with a special offer: Takuto can have a chance at vengeance on the monster he blames for killing Maki and destroying his life if he joins FUNERAL, the organization dealing with the aliens. Takuto accepts the offer; months later, he is "reborn" as military pilot Lieutenant Ryu Soma. In the meantime, FUNERAL eventually recaptures Frank (who escaped after the explosion at MORGUE); the organization soon discovers that Frank is the best weapon FUNERAL has to defend against the aliens. This leaves Ryu torn between revenge for the death of Maki and the desire to protect his comrades and the planet. Further complicating the picture is a young girl named Hattie (Harriet), the only person that can communicate with Frank, who bears a striking resemblance to Maki. As FUNERAL learns that Frank is more than a simple monster, Ryu and his comrades must come to terms with questions of human identity, grief, and loss.

== Cast ==
=== Japanese cast ===
- Houko Kuwashima as Harriet "Hattie" Bartholomew/Maki Agata
- Sōichirō Hoshi as Takuto Kaneshiro/Ryu Soma
- Jouji Nakata as Michael Heartland
- Kikuko Inoue as Guinevere Green
- Sayuri as Lana Ines
- Takehito Koyasu as Dan Simmonds
- Yūji Takada as Frank, Yuri Leonov, Defense Official, Henry Harris
- Yui Horie as Sue Harris
- Mitsuaki Madono as the Sheriff

=== English cast ===
- Stephen Apostolina - Army Official B
- Beau Billingslea - Captain Michael Heartland
- Richard Cansino - Mr. X (or Edward Lawrence)
- Dorothy Elias-Fahn - Maki Agata
- Lynn Fischer - P.A., Kroka Leonov
- Sandy Fox - Harriet 'Hattie' Bartholomew
- Crispin Freeman - Morgue Military Official, First Lt. Dan Simmons
- Steve Kramer - Funeral Board, Army Official A, Astronomer, Cook
- Lex Lang - Frank
- Wendee Lee - Joan
- Dave Mallow - Bird House Operator, Guard, Doctor, Defense Man B, Base Guard, Ulysses Transmission, Ground Control, Additional Voices
- Michael McConnohie - Funeral Unit Commander, Dignitary A, General
- Mary Elizabeth McGlynn - Countdown Announcement, Stacey, News Anchor, Apartment Super, Scarlet, Auntie
- Lara Jill Miller - Second Lt. Sue Harris
- Tony Oliver - Gate Guard, Border Patrol Pilot B, Dr. Takahashi, Air Force Official B
- Paul St. Peter - Morgue Officer
- Tony Pope - Official
- Simon Prescott - Air Force Official A, Scientist A
- Jamieson Price - Base Alert, Funeral Board, Government Man, Colonel Kilgore, Control Tower
- Derek Stephen Prince - Lab Assistant B
- Michelle Ruff - Narrator, Reporter, Funeral Operator, Nurse (voice: English version)
- Philece Sampler - Ai, Elaine Symond, Secretary (voice: English version)
- Melodee Spevack - Commander Lana Ines
- Steve Staley - Takuto Kaneshiro/Second Lt. Ryu Soma
- Doug Stone - Dr. Ernest Noguchi
- Julie Ann Taylor - Joan #2, Amian
- Paula Mattiloi Walker - First Lt Guinevere Green
- Dave Wittenberg - Sheriff
- Tom Wyner - UN Officer, Grandpa

== Episode list ==
| No. | Title | Original release date |
|---|---|---|
| 1 | "Rebirth and Death" "Saisei to Shi to" (Japanese: 再生と死と) | October 5, 2000 |
| 2 | "Death and the Maiden" "Shi to Shōjo to" (Japanese: 死と少女と) | October 12, 2000 |
| 3 | "The Maiden and the Meeting" "Shōjo to Deai to" (Japanese: 少女と出会いと) | October 19, 2000 |
| 4 | "The Meeting and Hatred" "Deai to Zōo to" (Japanese: 出会いと憎悪と) | October 26, 2000 |
| 5 | "Hatred and War" "Zōo to Arasoi to" (Japanese: 憎悪と争いと) | November 2, 2000 |
| 6 | "War and Escape" "Arasoi to Tōhi to" (Japanese: 争いと逃避と) | November 9, 2000 |
| 7 | "Escape and Memories" "Tōhi to Tsuioku to" (Japanese: 逃避と追憶と) | November 16, 2000 |
| 8 | "Memories and Solitude" "Tsuioku to Kodoku to" (Japanese: 追憶と孤独と) | November 23, 2000 |
| 9 | "Solitude and Sadness" "Kodoku to Ai to" (Japanese: 孤独と哀と) | November 30, 2000 |
| 10 | "Sadness and Malice" "Ai to Satsui to" (Japanese: 哀と殺意と) | December 7, 2000 |
| 11 | "Malice and Betrayal" "Saitsui to Uragiri to" (Japanese: 殺意と裏切りと) | December 14, 2000 |
| 12 | "Betrayal and Despair" "Uragiri to Zetsubō to" (Japanese: 裏切りと絶望と) | December 21, 2000 |
| 13 | "Despair and Hope" "Zetsubou to Kibō to" (Japanese: 絶望と希望と) | December 28, 2000 |
| 14 | "Hope and Confusion" "Kibō to Konton to" (Japanese: 希望と混沌と) | January 11, 2001 |
| 15 | "Confusion and Conflict" "Konton to Kattō to" (Japanese: 混沌と葛藤と) | January 18, 2001 |
| 16 | "Conflict and Decisions" "Kattō to Ketsui to" (Japanese: 葛藤と決意と) | January 25, 2001 |
| 17 | "Decisions and the Past" "Ketsui to Kako to" (Japanese: 決意と過去と) | February 1, 2001 |
| 18 | "The Past and Crimes" "Kako to Daizai to" (Japanese: 過去と大罪と) | February 8, 2001 |
| 19 | "Crimes and Punishments" "Daizai to Imashime to" (Japanese: 大罪と戒めと) | February 15, 2001 |
| 20 | "Punishments and Awakening" "Imashime to Kakusei to" (Japanese: 戒めと覚醒と) | February 22, 2001 |
| 21 | "Awakening and Truth" "Kakusei to Shinjitsu to" (Japanese: 覚醒と真実と) | March 1, 2001 |
| 22 | "Truth and Destruction" "Shinjitsu to Hametsu to" (Japanese: 真実と破滅と) | March 8, 2001 |
| 23 | "Destruction and Courage" "Hametsu to Yūki to" (Japanese: 破滅と勇気と) | March 15, 2001 |
| 24 | "Courage and Love" "Yūki to Ai to" (Japanese: 勇気と愛と) | March 22, 2001 |
| 25 | "Love and Rebirth" "Ai to Saisei to" (Japanese: 愛と再生と) | March 29, 2001 |
| OVA | "Alone and By Myself" "Kodoku to Kodoku" (Japanese: 孤独と孤独) | February 21, 2002 |

== Music ==
=== OP Single - Silent Wind ===
"Argento Soma - Silent Wind"

Song by Eri Sugai
- Released: Nov 22, 2000
- Genre: Anime
- Label: Victor Entertainment
- Composer: Katsuhisa Hattori
- Lyricist: Kitagawa Keiko

The single album to the opening song

Track Listing
| No. | Title | Length |
|---|---|---|
| 1. | "Silent Wind" | 3:40 |
| 2. | "Silent Wind (TV Version)" | 1:40 |
| 3. | "Silent Wind (KH-R Heavy Industrial Mix)" | 5:32 |
| 4. | "Silent Wind (Original Karaoke)" | 3:39 |

=== Original Soundtrack I ===
Argento Soma - Original Soundtrack I

Soundtrack album
- Released: Dec 16, 2000
- Genre: Anime
- Label: Victor Entertainment

First OST Album

Track Listing
| No. | Title | Length |
|---|---|---|
| 1. | "Fatal one : Shukumei no hito" |
| 2. | "Silent Wind (TV Ver.)" |
| 3. | "a wonderful world (Instrumental Ver.)" |
| 4. | "Fragile memory" |
| 5. | "kusari ni tsunagareta tamashii" |
| 6. | "Profiling" |
| 7. | "Flying commander" |
| 8. | "Departure" |
| 9. | "Flight from confusion" |
| 10. | "kindan no sasayaki" |
| 11. | "Immortal love" |
| 12. | "samayou yousei" |
| 13. | "kyoui no mukou ni" |
| 14. | "kanashiki chikara" |
| 15. | "Silent Wind (Instrumental Ver.)" |
| 16. | "a wonderful world (English Ver.)" |
| 17. | "Strained relation" |
| 18. | "Fumble around" |
| 19. | "yami kara no shoutaijou" |
| 20. | "yume, kuchihatete" |
| 21. | "Horizon (Instrumental Ver.)" |
| 22. | "Horizon (TV Ver.)" |

=== Original Soundtrack II ===
Argento Soma - Original Soundtrack II

Soundtrack album
- Released: Mar 03, 2001
- Genre: Anime
- Label: Victor Entertainment

Second OST Album

Track Listing
| No. | Title | Length |
|---|---|---|
| 1. | "Silent Wind (full version)" |
| 2. | "Horizon (full version)" |
| 3. | "Behind the Decision" |
| 4. | "SARG" |
| 5. | "Primary Tactics" |
| 6. | "Kizu" |
| 7. | "Turning Point" |
| 8. | "Silent Wind (arranged piano solo ver.)" |
| 9. | "Shizukanaru Gyakusatsu" |
| 10. | "Mugibatake wo Wataru Kaze" |
| 11. | "Subarashiki Wagaya e" |
| 12. | "The Astronauts" |
| 13. | "Oritatta Unmei" |
| 14. | "Chaotic Development" |
| 15. | "Todokanai Kotoba" |
| 16. | "Silent Wind (piano solo)" |
| 17. | "A Wonderful World (orchestra version)" |
| 18. | "Kakusaku" |
| 19. | "Dark Organization" |
| 20. | "Inbou to Fuan to" |
| 21. | "Unknown" |
| 22. | "Muku no Kokoro - Hattie" |
| 23. | "Silent Wind (acoustic version)" |
| 24. | "Silent Wind (orchestra version)" |

=== Image Album - "if" For the Future Lovers ===
"if" For the Future Lovers

Soundtrack album by Various Artist
- Released: 2001
- Genre: Anime
- Label: Victor Entertainment

Contains songs not in the main soundtrack.

Track Listing
| No. | Title | Music | Length |
|---|---|---|---|
| 1. | "Prologue" | Various | 1:21 |
| 2. | "For the future Lovers" | Kuwashima Houko | 4:35 |
| 3. | "Wonderful World (KH-R"H0213 EX" MIX)" | Kuwashima Houko | 4:14 |
| 4. | "Wonderful World (KH-R"H0213 EX" MIX)" | Hoshi Souichirou | 1:33 |
| 5. | "Silent Wind" | Kuwashima Houko | 3:41 |
| 6. | "Kaigara no Yume" | Kuwashima Houko | 2:02 |
| 7. | "Argent Soma (KH-R "SPR4 ULTIMATE MIX")" | DJ K. HASEGAWA | 7:19 |
| 8. | "Hoshi no Umi E" | Various | 0:49 |
| 9. | "Kowaremono - Fragile" | Kuwashima Houko | 2:18 |
| 10. | "Pilgrimage No.3" | Katsuhisa Hattori | 5:02 |
| 11. | "Epilogue" | Various | 1:40 |
