= Toshiwo Doko =

Japanese engineer (1896–1988)

- 土光 敏夫
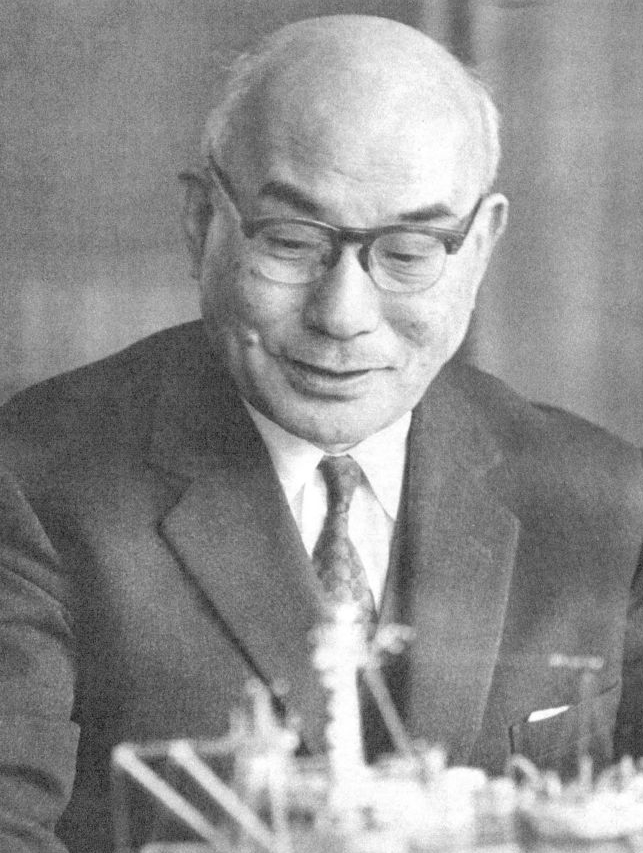
- Born: September 15, 1896; Mitsu, Okayama, Japan
- Died: August 4, 1988 (aged 91); Tokyo, Japan
- Education: Tokyo Institute of Technology
- Scientific career
- Workplaces: Ishikawajima Shipyard Co.; Ishikawajima-Harima Heavy Industries Co. Ltd.; Toshiba

Toshiwo Doko (土光 敏夫 Dokō Toshio; September 15, 1896 – August 4, 1988) was a Japanese engineer born in Mitsu District, Okayama, Manager, President and Chairman of Ishikawajima Heavy Industry (IHI) and Toshiba.

== Background ==
Dokō was a key manager in the Japanese economic miracle after World War II, in particular, from 1974 to 1980 when he helmed the Toshiba Corporation and was appointed chairman of the Japan Business Federation (Keidanren).

After graduating from Tokyo Institute of Technology (or Tokyo Kogyo Daigaku) in 1920, Dokō worked at the Ishikawajima Shipyard Co., first as a designer of turbines and then became a president from 1950 to 1960, during which he renewed the company to benefit from significant procurement provided by the United States during the Korean War.

Dokō later chaired the Ishikawajima-Harima Heavy Industries Co. Ltd. during the merger in 1960, overseeing the construction of the Idemitsu Maru, the largest tanker in the world. At Toshiba, he functioned as a vice president between 1965 and 1972, and became the president between 1972 and 1976. He raised the morale of the workers driving the company towards prosperity. During 1970's, he had a relationship with a company such as Standard Oil.

Dokō maintained 40-years of perfect attendance at work when at IHI in which he was never late or absent. His breakfast was simple and consisted of a piece of fish, rice and miso soup. His breakfast and lifestyle remained unchanged even after becoming the top of IHI and earning significant wealth. He rarely used air conditioning in summer and heating in winter and donated more than half of his salary during 1970s to the school his mother established in Yokohama. He was also known to eat cold soba noodles for lunch every day.

In 1988, he posthumously received the highest distinction of the Scout Association of Japan, the Golden Pheasant Award.
