= Runa Akiyama =

Japanese voice actress (1954–2014)

- あきやまるな
- Born: Teruko Akiyama (秋山照子); April 17, 1954; Tokyo Metropolis, Japan
- Died: March 8, 2014 (aged 59)
- Occupation: voice actress
- Years active: 1975-2014
- Agent: 81 Produce

Runa Akiyama (あきやまるな, Akiyama Runa; April 17, 1954 – March 8, 2014) was a Japanese voice actress. Her real name was Teruko Akiyama (秋山照子, Akiyama Teruko). She was born in the Metropolitan area of Tokyo, Japan. She was affiliated with the voice talent management group 81 Produce at the time of her death.

== Later years ==
During her later life, her work was officially ended due to her poor physical condition.

== Death ==
Akiyama suffered heart failure in her home. She was 59 years old. She was taken to the hospital, where the cause of death was found to be heart failure.

== Filmography ==
=== Anime ===
- Zendaman (1979 TV series)
- Time Patrol-Tai Otasukeman (1980 TV series)
- Yattodetaman (1981 TV series)
- Ninja Hattori-kun (1981-1987 TV series), 夢子
- Gyakuten Ippatsu-man (1982 TV series)
- The New Adventures of Honeybee Maya (1982 TV Series), Maya
- The Flying House (1982 TV series), Tsukubō Natsuyama (Corky)
- Itadakiman (1983 TV series)
- Pasocon Travel Tanteidan (1983 TV series), Yuu Asuka (Uri)
- Ginga Hyōryū Vifam (1983 TV series), Pench
- Attacker You! (1984 TV series), Sunny
- Yoroshiku Mechadock (1984 TV series)
- Soreike! Anpanman (1988 TV series), Milk boy
- Aoi Blink (1989 TV series)
- Asobou! Hello Kitty (1994 TV series), Patty
- Detective Conan (1996 TV series), Megumi (ep 126, 127)
- Ginga Hyōryū Vifam 13 (1998 TV series), Pench Iliza
- (阿貴的家族 アークエ・ファミリー全員集合!!) (2001 TV series), アーマ
- Ki Fighter Taerang (2002 Korean TV series), Momoa
- (アークエとガッチンポー) (2004 TV series), アーマ
- (アークエとガッチンポー てんこもり) (2005 TV series), アーマ

=== Dub ===
- The Love Boat
- Goosebumps (Tara) (Episode: "The Cuckoo Clock of Doom")
