= Park Kun-bae =

South Korean businessman (born 1948)

- Born: 25 October 1948 (age 77)
- Known for: President of the Boy Scouts of Korea

Korean name
- Hangul: 박건배
- Hanja: 朴健培
- RR: Bak Geonbae
- MR: Pak Kŏnbae

Park Kun-bae (Korean: 박건배; born October 25, 1948) served as President of the Boy Scouts of Korea, and as a member of the World Scout Committee.

== Background ==
In 1999, Park was awarded the 277th Bronze Wolf, the only distinction of the World Organization of the Scout Movement, awarded by the World Scout Committee for exceptional services to world Scouting, as well as the highest distinction of the Scout Association of Japan, the Golden Pheasant Award.

== See also ==
- Haitai
