= In the Beginning: The Bible Stories =

Anime television series

- In the Beginning: Stories from the Bible

手塚治虫の旧約聖書物語 (Tezuka Osamu no Kyūyaku Seisho Monogatari)
- Created by: Osamu Tezuka
- Anime television series
- Directed by: Osamu Dezaki
- Produced by: Masami Takagishi; Hime Miura; Hidehiko Takei; Masao Nakamura; Yoshihiro Iwasa; Minoru Kubota
- Written by: Tezuka Productions
- Music by: Katsuhisa Hattori; Reimy
- Studio: Tezuka Productions
- Original network: Rai 1
- English network: Eternal Word Television Network; Australian Christian Channel; Shine TV
- Original run: November 30, 1992 – May 31, 1993
- Episodes: 26

In the Beginning: Stories from the Bible (手塚治虫の旧約聖書物語, Tezuka Osamu no Kyūyaku Seisho Monogatari; lit. Osamu Tezuka's Bible Stories) is a Japanese-Italian anime television series. The series was a coproduction between Japan's Nippon TV and Italy's government-owned broadcaster, Radiotelevisione Italiana (RAI) and animated by Tezuka Productions. Although the series was in production during a period of several years in the late 1980s and early 1990s, it was not aired in Japan until April 1, 1997, on the satellite channel Wowow, while it premiered in Italy on November 30, 1992, on Rai 1. The series has also been aired on TV in the United States (on the Catholic-oriented Eternal Word Television Network), Spain, Germany, and Australia (on Australian Christian Channel).

In the Beginning: Stories from the Bible marked the fourth time Bible stories formed the basis of a Japanese-animated television series, following the two Superbook series and The Flying House, which were made for Pat Robertson's Christian Broadcasting Network by Tatsunoko Production in the early 1980s.

In the Beginning: Stories from the Bible features episodes devoted to most of the major stories of the Bible, including the stories of the Creation, Cain and Abel, Noah's Ark, Abraham and Isaac, Joseph, Moses, David, and Solomon, with the final episode featuring the Nativity of Jesus. As with the second Superbook series, some stories were stretched out over several episodes. Unlike Superbook and The Flying House, however, no contemporary characters from modern times were inserted into the stories, save for the series mascots and viewpoint characters, Roco the fox and Mimi the vixen.

Tezuka's manga work frequently included religious themes, and because of his long-running manga Buddha, he is sometimes perceived as having been a devout Buddhist, but in fact, Tezuka was largely agnostic.

The theme music (for the English version), an ending theme called "Rainbow Blue", is written and performed by Reimy, and is the only ending theme that has English lyrics both in the Japanese version, the English version, and in the Spanish version. In the Italian version, an ending theme called "He Comes, He Saves You", is written by Paolo Zavallone and performed by Cristina Zavallone, and is the only ending theme that has English lyrics in the Italian version.

== Background ==
In the Beginning: Stories from the Bible grew out of a request that Osamu Tezuka received from the Vatican by way of RAI in 1984, requesting that Tezuka produce an animated version of the Bible. Tezuka spent two years working on a pilot series for the project based on the story of Noah's Ark and other stories from the Bible, both writing the scenario and doing the photography for the series and working in the production of the animation itself, but Tezuka died on February 9, 1989, before the series was finished. The remainder of the production for the pilot series and the subsequent 26-episode television series was supervised by director Osamu Dezaki.

== Episodes ==
| Number | English title | Japanese title | Italian title | Spanish title | Book of the Bible |
|---|---|---|---|---|---|
| 1 | The Creation (Adam & Eve, Part 1) | 天地創造 | I signori della Terra | La Creación (Adán y Eva, Parte 1) | Genesis |
| 2 | Cain and Abel (Adam & Eve, Part 2) | カインとアベル | I figli di Adamo | Caín y Abel (Adán y Eva, Parte 2) | Genesis |
| 3 | The Story of Noah (Noah's Ark) | ノアの箱舟 | L' avventura di Noè | La Historia de Noé (El Arca de Noé) | Genesis |
| 4 | The Tower of Babel | バベルの塔 | Una torre fino al cielo | La Torre de Babel | Genesis |
| 5 | Abraham, the Forefather | 父アブラハム | Abramo il patriarca | El Padre Abrahám | Genesis |
| 6 | Sodom and Gomorrah | ソドムとゴモラ | Sodoma e Gomorra | Sodoma y Gomorra | Genesis |
| 7 | Isaac and Ishmael | イサクとイシュマエル | Ismaele | Isaac e Ishmael | Genesis |
| 8 | Isacc's destiny (Abraham's Sacrifice) | アブラハム、イサクを捧げる | Il destino di Isacco | El destino de Isaac (La Prueba de Abrahám, translated as El sacrificio de Abrahám) | Genesis |
| 9 | Jacob's children (Joseph in Bondage) | ヨセフの夢占い | Venduto dai fratelli | José en Esclavitud (Vendido por sus hermandos) | Genesis |
| 10 | Joseph's triumph | ヤコブ一族の再会 | Il trionfo di Giuseppe | El Trinfo de José | Genesis |
| 11 | Moses, The Egyptian | モーセの誕生 | Mosè l'egiziano | Moisés el Eqipcio | Exodus |
| 12 | The Fire in the Desert (The Burning Bush) | 砂漠の火 | Il fuoco nel deserto | El Fuego en el Fesierto (La Zarza en Llamas) | Exodus |
| 13 | Moses and the Pharaoh (Moses & Pharaoh) | モーセとファラ | Mosè e il faraone | Moisés y Faraon (Moisés y el Faraon) | Exodus |
| 14 | The Exodus | エジプト脱出 | L'Esodo | El Exodo | Exodus |
| 15 | Laws carved in stone (The Ten Commandments) | 十戒 | La legge scolpita sulla pietra | Leyes grabadas en piedra (Los Diez Madamientos) | Exodus |
| 16 | Israel's Treachery (The Golden Calf) | イスラエルの裏切り | Il vitello d'oro | La traición de Israel (El Becerro de Oro) | Exodus |
| 17 | New Alliance (Journey to the Promised Land) | 約束の地 | La Terra Promessa | Nueva Alianza (La tierra prometida) | Deuteronomy |
| 18 | Jericho (The Fall of Jericho) | エリコ | Gerico | Jericó (La Caida de Jericó) | Joshua |
| 19 | One king for Israel | 初めての王サウル | Un re per Israele | Un rey para Israel | Judges and Samuel |
| 20 | King Saul (David and Goliath) | サウルの敗北 | La sconfitta di Saul | David y Goliat (La derrota de Saul) | Samuel |
| 21 | King David | ダビデ王 | Il seme di Davide | El rey David | Samuel |
| 22 | King Solomon (The Wisdom of Solomon) | ソロモンの王国 | Il regno di Salomone | La Sabiduría de Salomón (El rey Salomón) | Kings |
| 23 | The Exile of Israel | バビロン捕囚 | L'esilio di Israele | El destierro de Israel | Kings and Ezekiel |
| 24 | Release from Bondage | 奴隷からの解放 | Gerusalemme, Gerusalemme | Liberación de la Esclavitud (Libertad en Babilonia) | Ezra |
| 25 | Prophets in the desert | 砂漠の預言者たち | Profeti del deserto | Profetas en el desierto | Luke and Matthew |
| 26 | The birth of Jesus | イエスの誕生 | Una stella brilla ad Oriente | El nacimento de Jesús | Luke and Matthew |

== Staff ==
- Animation created by: Osamu Tezuka
- Produced by: RAI-Radiotelevisione Italiana, NTV-Nippon Television Network Corp.
- Executive production: Tezuka Productions
- Executive producers: Shinichi Okada (Chukyo TV Broadcasting), Masahiro Kurata (Nippon Television Network), Takayuki Matsutani (Tezuka Productions), Luciano Scaffa (Radiotelevisione Italiana)
- Scenario: Tezuka Productions
- Producers: Masami Takagishi, Hime Miura, Hidehiko Takei, Masao Nakamura
- Music composed by: Katsuhisa Hattori
- Character design: Osamu Tezuka, Shinji Seya
- Animation directors: Masaki Yoshimura, Akio Sugino, Shinji Seya, Junji Kobayashi, Hideaki Shimada
- Art directors: Kazuo Okada, Masami Saito
- Directed by: Osamu Dezaki
- Biblical advisors: Emilio Gandolfo, Pietro Bovati S.J.
- Supervised and coordinated by: Marco Pagot, Luca Lamonaca
- Scenario: Luciano Scaffa, Guerrino Gentilni, Luca Lamonaca
- Assistant directors: Takashi Ui, Yusaku Saotome, Fumihiro Yoshimura, Shinichi Matsumi
- Assistant producer: Sumio Udagawa
- Production managers: Satoshi Kuwabara, Mitsuaki Ōishi, Takeshi Yoshimoto
- Photography: Studio Wood, Takahashi Production, Tezuka Productions, T. Nishimura, Mushi Production, Madhouse, Studio Cosmos
- Editors: Masahiro Matsumura, Harutoshi Ogata
- Color direction: Satomi Murai
- Finishing animation: Beijing Xie Le Art Co., Ltd.
- Animation check: Tomoko Kawaguchi, Kaoru Kanō
- Animation production in cooperation with: J.C. Staff, Mushi Production, Madhouse, Shaft, Tama Production, Asatsu-DK (D.K. 1)
- Music selection: Katsuhisa Yoshino, Yutaka Goda
- Sound effects: Shizuo Kurahashi
- Mixer: Nobuyoshi Kamibayashi (Aoi Studio)
- Music in cooperation with: Nippon Television Music Corporation
- Coordination: Imago Inc., Tokyo
- Production managers: Masami Takagishi, Koji Shibata, Hime Miura, Hidehiko Takei, Masao Nakamura, Kuniaki Nagayama, Enrica Benni

=== Japanese broadcast production ===
- Recording production: Audio Planning U Co., Ltd., APU Studio
- Sound director: Katsuyoshi Kobayashi
- Supervisor: Yoko Imamichi (Saint Paulo Monastic Order for Women)
- Producers: Yoshihiro Iwasa, Minoru Kubota
- Production coordination: Satoshi Kuwabara

== Voice cast ==
- Laura Lenghi, Alessio Cigliano – Roco, Mimi
- Mayumi Tanaka – Roco
- Usmid Patix – Roco
- Motoko Kumai – Mimi, younger brother (Seth)
- Fabrizio Temperini - Adam
- Kinryū Arimoto – Adam
- Laura Boccanera - Eve, Lot's wife
- Yorie Terauchi – Eve
- Rori Manfredi – Cain
- Katsuhiro Kitagawa – Cain
- Alessio Cigliano – Abel
- Mitsuru Miyamoto – Abel
- Isa Di Marzio – Noah
- Yuzuru Fujimoto – Noah
- Sho Saito – Noah's wife
- Tatsuyuki Jinnai - Shem
- Yūko Sasaki – Rebecca, Shem's Wife
- Minoru Inaba – Ham
- Tsutomu Kashiwakura – Japheth
- Shigezō Sasaoka – Egyptian Elder
- Tarō Arakawa – A
- Naoki Makishima – B
- Mitsuaki Hoshino – C
- Hiroshi Hashimoto – Servant
- Yoshiko Akiyama – Woman
- Daisuke Sakaguchi – Asaph
- Yoshiaki Hirao – Leader
- Banjō Ginga – Patriarch
- Yukio Hirota – Supervisor
- Takashi Taguchi – Priest
- Yukihiro Yoshida – Shopkeeper
- Eiji Maruyama – Old Man
- Kazunobu Chiba – Hard Labor
- Seizō Katō – Abraham
- Junko Midori – Sarah
- Masaaki Tsukada – Elder
- Mika Doi – Hagar
- Ryuji Nakagi – Lot
- Tamie Kubota – Lot's wife
- Katsumi Toriumi – Ishmael
- Marco Vivio – Issac
- Tetsuya Iwanaga – Isaac
- Satoru Yanase – Angel of God (B)
- Yonehiko Kitagawa – Jacob
- Marco Vivio – Joseph
- Hiroshi Yanaka – Joseph
- Ikue Otani – Young Benjamin
- Shun Tanikawa – Benjamin
- Manabu Ino – Young Moses
- Tesshō Genda – Moses
- Tetsuaki Kuroda – Old Moses
- Takeshi Watabe – Pharaoh
- Osamu Saka – Aaron
- Mizuka Arima – Miriam
- Jouji Nakata – Joshua
- Tomomichi Nishimura – King of Jericho
- Yurika Hino – Rahab
- Masato Yamanouchi – Samuel
- Hiro Yūki – Young David
- Unshō Ishizuka – David, Abimelech & Cyrus
- Yuu Shimaka – Goliath
- Takaya Hashi – Saul
- Akio Otsuka – Young Ezekiel
- Tamio Ōki – Old Ezekiel
- Ryūzaburō Ōtomo – Nebuchadnezzar
- Takeshi Aono – Belshazzar
- Shin Aomori – Solomon
- Motomu Kiyokawa – Prophet
- Hiroaki Hirata – Saint Joseph
- Yuri Amano – Mary
- Show Hayami – Messenger of God
- Michele Kalamera, Sandro Iovino – God
- Hidekatsu Shibata – God
- Emilio Cappuccio, Ilaria Borrell, Roberto Romei, Sandro Iovino – Narration
- Akira Kume – Narration
