= Hook Book Row =

Japanese children's TV series

- Genre: Kids; Variety show Puppetry; Music
- Opening theme: "Aozora Shinkokyū"
- Ending theme: "Omoide Shoten" "Monogatari wa Tszuiteru" "Mashiro Page ni Nani Egakō" "Akogare Azukuruma" "Sora Iro I Love You" "Hyōshi no Mukou wa Wonderland"
- Composers: Keisuke Yamakawa; Takayuki Hattori
- Country of origin: Japan
- Original language: Japanese

Production
- Running time: 10 minutes
- Production companies: NHK Enterprises; Sony Pictures Television

Original release
- Network: NHK Educational; NHK World Premium; TV Japan (North America); Syndication (United States)
- Release: March 28, 2011 – April 1, 2016

Hook Book Row (フックブックロー, Fukku Bukku Rō) is a Japanese children's television program broadcast by NHK Educational TV. It is the 3rd NHK musical puppet variety show overall, the first one being Hotch Potch Station, and the second being Quintet.

== Introduction ==
The show is centered around the ''Hibi Hanseido''. An old bookstore that resides around the outskirts of Tokyo. However, no one comes to the worn bookstore anymore, and visits are quite rare.

The show includes both puppets and humans and has a range of different genres of music, including original and covers of popular songs.

== Program ==
- 1st Part: Opening Theme Song
- 2nd Part: A story presenting Kessaku and the other puppets. A song would then be shown and performed. (The song would either be an original song, or a cover of a few popular J-pop, or anime songs)
- 3rd Part: After the puppet show, a series of clips would be shown. These clips would tell a story, along with a song.
- 4th Part: The credits would be shown as the ending theme plays.

=== Hook Book Row: Mini ===
A shorter 5 minute version of the original 10 minute show.

- 1st Part: Instead of the theme song playing, We see the main cast saying ''Hook Book Row'', while Shiori then shouts ''Mini''.
- 2nd Part: Shiori would be in the DJ Booth, chatting with the others. A song would then play.
- 3rd Part: There would be an eye catch at the end.

== Characters ==
Kessaku Hirazumi (Kenichiro Tanimoto)
The only human in the show. His age is unknown. Kessaku works as a part time clerk at the bookstore, 'Hibi Hanseido'.
He has a kind-hearted soul but can be very indecisive at times. He is mainly friends with Shiori. He loves music and he dreams of publishing his own CD. he can play the guitar, the ukulele, and the bass. He's not very good at skating.
Shiori Novel (Fumiko Orikasa)
Shiori is the main female protagonist and is Mokuji's granddaughter. She is 21 years old and is in her 3rd college year. She always wears a red bow on her head at all times. She helps her grandfather's business by running the Hibi Hanseido online bookstore.
She wants to inherit her grandfather's business and turn the old, worn-down bookstore into a fashion complex, much to her grandfather's dismay. Even though she is usually sweet, she can be self-centered. She can play the flute and keyboard. She used to dislike Lyric, as she is more of a dog person, but does warm up to her and accepts her.
Noberu Novel (Ryūsei Nakao)
Noberu(Mokuji) is the owner of the Hibi Hanseido He is 70 years old. In the show, he is constantly called ''Mokuji'', as it is his nickname. He truly loves his store and tries his best at everything he does with it.
Even through he's very old, he's very energetic, flashy, and has a witty personality. He's a big fan of Western styled and rock movies. He's very good at playing hide-and-seek. He can play the accordion and electric guitar. He can also tap dance.
Goji and Datsuji (Hiroyuki Amano)
Goji and Datsuji are identical twins. They are both 23, currently taking their college exams, and visit the Hibi Hanseido every day in their free time. They both live in a large mansion, since they come from a rich family. They are both big fans of Shiori and operate a fan club for her.
So far, they are the only members. Even though they are both taking their exams, they both hate studying and Shiori has to encourage them both to study. Goji can play the sax and bass, and Datsuji can play percussion. Just like Mokuji, they can both tap dance.
Lyric (Rinko Urashima)
Lyric is an old gray cat that resides in the Hibi Hanseido. Her age is unknown, but it is implied that she is older than Shiori. She is loved by everyone in the store, except Shiori. She has the ability to talk, but only Kessaku understands her. She was once a stray, but Kessaku took her in. She longed to see the ocean for herself, so Kessaku took her while riding on his bicycle, but they had to delay it since they got a flat tire.
In a later episode, it is revealed that Lyric had a younger sister, but they were separated before Kessaku found her. She goes to the cats' meeting late at night.

== Original Songs ==
The show features many original songs, written by Takayuki Hattori and composed by Keisuke Yamakawa.

- ''Aozora Shinkokyu'' [青空しんこきゅう]
- "Let's go to Ihatov" [イーハトーブへ行こう]
- "I Feel Good From This Morning" [朝からいい気分]
- "The Lost Children in the Picture Book Forest" [絵本の森の迷子たち]
- "OK with A Wink" [ウインクでOK]
- "The Clown's Tears are Konpeitou" [ピエロの涙は金平糖]
- "Goodbye, Teddy Bear" [さよならテディ・ベア]
- "Cats Know Everything" [猫はなんでも知っている]
- "I Want to Be a Rainbow" [虹になりたい]
- "Pa~t Party!" [ぱ～っとパーティー!]
- "Making Taiyaki" [タイ焼き焼いた]
- "Be Fine Tomorrow" [あした天気に・元気になあれ]
- "Moon Music Box" [月のオルゴール]
- "Angel Chan and Devil Chan" [エンジェルちゃんとデビルっち]
- "Christmas Samba" [クリスマス・サンバ]
- "Ghost GoGo!" [おばけのGoGo!]
- "Poco-a-Poco" [ぽこ・あ・ぽこ]
- "Galactic Library" [銀河図書館]
- "Paper Airplane" [ゆうやけ紙ヒコーキ]
- "The Sea is Nice" [海っていいな]
- "Yurarun Swing" [ゆらるんブランコ]

== Cover Songs ==
Along with the original songs, there were also covers of popular Japanese songs.

- "I Wanted To Meet You" [会いたかった] (Original song by AKB48)
- "UFO" (Original song by PINK LADY)
- "Let's Walk Home" [歩いて帰ろう] (Original song by Kazuyoshi Saito)
- "Carrying You" [君をのせて'] (Original song written by Hayao Miyazaki and composed by Joe Hisaishi, appeared in Castle in the Sky)
- "LOVE LOVE LOVE: Dreams Come True" [LOVE LOVE LOVE/嵐が来る] (Original song published by the band, Dreams Come True)
- "You're a Natural Color" [君は天然色] (Original song by Eiichi Otaki)
- "I'm Too Sad to do it" [悲しくてやりきれない] (Original song by The Folk Crusaders)

== CDs and DVDs ==
=== CDs ===
- Hook Book Row: Take A Deep Breath [ちょっと深呼吸] ( Dec. 7th, 2011)
- Hook Book Row: Let's Relax [のんびりいこうよ] (Oct, 10th, 2012)
- Hook Book Row: Be Healthy Tomorrow [あした元気になあれ] ( May 22, 2013)
- Hook Book Row: Give The Gift Of Love [ラブをプレゼント] ( Jan. 29th, 2014)
- Hook Book Row: Pa~t Party! [ぱ〜っとパーティー!] ( Nov. 5th, 2014)
- Hook Book Row: The Best of Hook Book Row [フックブックローのふくぶくろ] ( Sept. 16th, 2015)
- Hook Book Row: Do You Want A Song? [歌はいりませんか？] ( Mar. 9th, 2016)

=== DVDs ===
- Hibi Hanseido Has Opened [日々はんせい堂開店] ( Mar, 9th, 2012)
- Hibi Hanseido's New Arrivals [日々はんせい堂新作入荷] ( Apr. 26th, 2013)
- Hibi Hanseido Is Now Open [日々はんせい堂営業中] (Apr. 25th, 2014)
- Hibi Hanseido's Business [日々はんせい堂あきない中] (Apr. 24th, 2015)

== Production ==
- Producer/Director: Keisuke Yamakawa
- Music: Takayuki Hattori, Face Music
- Puppet controllers: Yoshiko Kashima, Kimio Okano, Gakosaku, Hikaru Shimizu, Yasuko Kuwaori, Mayumi Shimamura, Shimon Takagu, Kaori Nakajima, Chikako Numadate, Nami Takahashi
- Puppetmaster: Kigutsunoki
- Art Direction/Set Design: Ryuji Fujieda, Seijiro Mune, Akiko Kuramochi, Ei Shinomoto, Risui Yoshie
- Animation: Tadahiko Horiguchi
- Studio: NHK
