= Shokichi Iyanaga =

Japanese mathematician

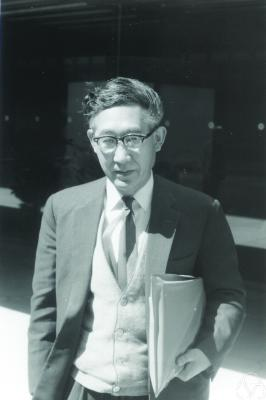
- Born: April 2, 1906; Tokyo, Japan
- Died: June 1, 2006 (aged 100); Tokyo, Japan
- Education: University of Tokyo
- Awards: Légion d'honneur
- Scientific career
- Fields: Mathematics
- Workplaces: University of Tokyo; Nagoya University; Gakushuin University
- Doctoral advisor: Teiji Takagi
- Doctoral students: Goro Azumaya; Akio Hattori; Yasutaka Ihara; Kiyoshi Itō; Kenkichi Iwasawa; Kunihiko Kodaira; Michio Kuga; Nagayoshi Iwahori; Takashi Ono; Mikio Sato; Michio Suzuki; Gaisi Takeuti; Tsuneo Tamagawa; Hidehiko Yamabe; Nobuo Yoneda

Shokichi Iyanaga (彌永 昌吉, Iyanaga Shōkichi; April 2, 1906 – June 1, 2006) was a Japanese mathematician.

== Early life ==
Iyanaga was born in Tokyo, Japan on April 2, 1906. He studied at the University of Tokyo from 1926 to 1929. He studied under Teiji Takagi. As an undergraduate, he published two papers in the Japanese Journal of Mathematics and the Proceedings of the Imperial Academy of Tokyo. Both of his papers appeared in print in 1928. After completing his undergraduate degree in 1929, he stayed at Tokyo and worked under Takagi for his doctorate. He completed his Ph.D. in mathematics 1931.

== Years in Europe ==
In 1931, Iyanaga obtained a scholarship from the French government. He also went to Hamburg, Germany where he studied with Austrian mathematician Emil Artin. In 1932, he attended the International Congress of Mathematicians in Zurich. During his time in Europe, he met with top mathematicians such as Claude Chevalley, Henri Cartan, and others.

== Academic career ==
Iyanaga returned to Tokyo in 1934 and was appointed Assistant Professor at the University of Tokyo. From 1935 to 1939, he didn't publish any research papers. According to Iyanaga, it was because of the pressure of teaching and other business to which he was not accustomed. He managed to solve a question of Artin on generalizing the principal ideal theorem and this was published in 1939.

Iyanaga did publish many papers which arose through several courses such as algebraic topology, functional analysis, and geometry, which he taught. He became professor at the University of Tokyo in 1942, during World War II. Towards the end of the war, many Japanese cities were bombarded and he had to find refuge in the countryside. He was busy in editing textbooks from primary and secondary schools and he continued to give courses and organise seminars.

After the end of the war, he joined the Science Council of Japan in 1947. He became a member of the Executive Committee of the International Mathematical Union in 1952. He was responsible for organizing the International Congress of Mathematicians in Amsterdam in 1954, which he attended. He was President of the International Commission on Mathematical Instruction from 1957 to 1978.

Iyanaga spent the year 1961-62 at the University of Chicago. He became Dean of the faculty of Science at the University of Tokyo in 1965, a position he held until his retirement in 1967. After his retirement, he was a visiting professor during 1967-68 at the University of Nancy in France. From 1967 to 1977, he was a professor at Gakushuin University in Tokyo.

== Honors and awards ==
Iyanaga received several honors and awards for his work. He received the Rising Sun from Japan in 1976. He was elected a member of the Japan Academy in 1978. He received the Légion d'honneur in 1980.

== Publications ==
- Iyanaga, S. (1935), Sur les Classes d'Idéaux dans les Corps Quadratiques, Actualités Scientifiques et Industrielles, No. 197, Paris: Hermann; pamphlet 13 pp.
- Iyanaga, Shokichi, ed. (1975), Theory of Numbers, North-Holland mathematical library, North Holland, ISBN 978-0720424584

== See also ==
- Iyanaga Prize
