= Ayakazu Hirose =

Japanese scouting leader

- 廣瀬 文一
- Occupations: Chairman of the National Executive Council, and member of the National Board of Governors of the Boy Scouts of Nippon

Ayakazu Hirose (廣瀬 文一, Hirose Ayakazu) served as the Chairman of the National Executive Council, and as a member of the National Board of Governors of the Boy Scouts of Nippon.

== Background ==
In 1992, Hirose was awarded the 218th Bronze Wolf, the only distinction of the World Organization of the Scout Movement, awarded by the World Scout Committee for exceptional services to world Scouting. In 1997 he also received the highest distinction of the Scout Association of Japan, the Golden Pheasant Award.
