= The Flying House (TV series) =

Japanese anime television series

- Original poster
- トンデラハウスの大冒険
- Genre: Christian Animation
- Directed by: Masakazu Higuchi (chief)
- Music by: Hiroshi Takada; Masayuki Chiyo
- Country of origin: Japan
- Original language: Japanese
- No. of episodes: 52

Production
- Executive producer: Kenji Yoshida
- Producers: Hajime Taniguchi; Akira Inoue
- Production company: Tatsunoko Production

Original release
- Network: MegaTON (TV Tokyo)
- Release: 5 April 1982 – 28 March 1983

The Flying House, known in Japan as Tondera Hausu no Daibōken (トンデラハウスの大冒険, The Flying House's Big Adventures), is a Christian anime television series produced by Tatsunoko Production broadcast from 5 April 1982 to 28 March 1983 on TV Tokyo, and distributed by the Christian Broadcasting Network in the United States. The Japanese opening song is "The Flying House's Big Adventures" (トンデラハウスの大冒険, Tondera Hausu no Daibōken) by Fusako Fujimoto. The Japanese ending song is "Adventure Heart" (冒険ハート, Bōken Hāto) by Yumi Okuhata, and the English opening is "The Flying House" by Stephan Peppos. Its instrumental version serves as the ending theme. In 2010, the Christian Broadcasting Network made the 52 episodes available for viewing online.

At the same time, CBN and Tatsunoko also produced a related series, Superbook.

In the Philippines, reruns of the show were broadcast on GMA Network in the early 1990s, ZOE TV in 2000s, ABS-CBN in 2015, Pop Life TV via digital free-to-air television BEAM TV, and Yey! via digital free-to-air television box ABS-CBN TV Plus. The episodes are currently broadcast on A2Z, All TV, Light TV, Kapamilya Channel and TV7. It was also broadcast on the Australian Christian Channel in Australia. It also aired on TBN UK & Ireland in the United Kingdom and Ireland.

== Plot ==
The series begins in the middle of a game of hide and seek, as a young boy named Justin Casey (Gen Adachi) finishes counting and begins searching for his friends, Angela "Angie" Roberts and her little brother Corwyn "Corky" Roberts (Kanna and Tsukubo Natsuyama). As he searches for Angie and Corky in a wooded area, a thunderstorm occurs. Justin manages to sneak up on the two before the rain starts pouring, forcing them to run for cover.

They eventually find a spacecraft type house in the wooded area, previously unseen according to Justin. At first glance it appears that nobody is home, until they discover a clown-battery type android named Solar Ion Robot (Kadenchin), or S.I.R. for short. They soon meet the owner of the house, Professor Humphrey Bumble (Dr. Tokio Taimu), who introduces the children to his greatest creation, a half rocket, half house, one of a kind time machine called The Flying House.

Professor Bumble's attempt at recreating Benjamin Franklin's famous lightning experiment with the use of a bat-looking kite flying outside the house to get the machine working leads to a temporary change in S.I.R.'s personality from being nice to mean and he goes berserk, before sending The Flying House in course to the past.

Justin, Angie, Corky, and S.I.R. realize how long the journey back home will take due to Professor Bumble's misguidance and errors in time travel, but in the meantime they witness and participate (with minimal consequences) in numerous events of the New Testament, from the birth of John the Baptist to the rise of the Paul the Apostle.

Eventually, they make it home exactly the same way they traveled into the past in the first place. S.I.R. gets a knock in the head which, again, makes him go from being nice to mean and go berserk and he attacks The Flying House. Ironically, S.I.R.'s frenzy fixes it in such a way that it finally sends the whole crew back to their own time period, and the show ends, with S.I.R. having changed back from being mean to nice by the end of the trip.

== Cast and characters ==
- Justin Casey (Billie Lou Watt): The best friend of Corky and Angie. His Japanese counterpart, Gen Adachi, is played by Satomi Majima.
- Angela "Angie" Roberts (Sonia Owens): Corky's older sister and Justin's best friend. Her Japanese counterpart, Kanna Natsuyama, is played by Sanae Takagi.
- Corwyn "Corky" Roberts (Helena Van Koert): Angie's little brother and Justin's other best friend. His Japanese counterpart, Tsukubo Natsuyama, is played by Runa Akiyama.
- Professor Humphrey Bumble (Hal Studer): The inventor of the Flying House and S.I.R.. His Japanese counterpart, Dr.Tokio Taimu, is played by Yoshito Yasuhara.
- Solar Ion Robot / S.I.R. (Ray Owens): Justin's, Angie's, and Corky's best friend, and Professor Bumble's clown-battery-type robotic assistant. His Japanese counterpart, Kandenchin, is played by Kyōko Tongū.

== Episode list ==
=== Season 1 (1982) ===
No. overall	No. in season	Title	Original release date
1	1	"Blast Off For the Past (紀元前にトンデラハウス、Kigenzen ni Tondera Hausu) B.C. from the Flying House"	5 April 1982
The Flying House transports the group from the 20th century to 1st century Judaea. The kids witness the birth of John the Baptist.
2	2	"Star-Spangled Night (赤ちゃん危機一髪, Akachan Kiki Ippatsu) Baby's Narrow Shutdown"	12 April 1982
In Bethlehem, at the manger, the kids witness the birth of Jesus.
3	3	"Lost and Found in Time (祭りに消えた少年, Matsuri ni Kieta Shōnen) At the Festival, the Disappeared Boy"	19 April 1982
At the Temple in Jerusalem, the kids witness the finding of the lost 12-year-old Jesus by Mary and Joseph.
4	4	"Voice in the Wilderness (またまた不時着！川の中, Mata mata Fujichaku! Kawa no Naka) Another emergency landing! River wide in"	26 April 1982
On the Jordan River, the kids witness the baptism of Jesus by John the Baptist.
5	5	"Speak of the Devil (サタンの誘惑, Satan no Yūwaku) Satan's Temptation"	3 May 1982
In the wilderness, the kids witness the temptation of Jesus.
6	6	"All That Glitters (悪徳商人の陰謀, Akutoku Shōnin no Inbō) Unscrupulous Merchants, the Conspiracy"	10 May 1982
In Capernaum, the kids witness Jesus calling Matthew, the tax collector, to be his disciple.
7	7	"Military Secrets (百人隊長の秘密, Hyakunintaichō no Himitsu) Centurion's Secret"	17 May 1982
In Capernaum, the kids witness Jesus healing the centurion's servant.
8	8	"The Prize That Was Won and Lost (呪いの誕生パーティー, Noroi no Tanjō Pātī) Cursed Birthday Party"	24 May 1982
In Machaerus, the kids witness the execution and death of John the Baptist.
9	9	"Another Life (生き返った娘, Ikikaetta Musume) Resurrected Daughter"	31 May 1982
In Capernaum, the kids witness Jesus raising Jairus' daughter from dead to life.
10	10	"The Runaway (5000人の給食, 5000-Ri no Kyūshoku) 5000 People having a Meal"	7 June 1982
At the Sea of Galilee, the kids witness Jesus feeding the 5,000 people by multiplying five loaves and two fishes.
11	11	"Neighbors (王様から借金した男, Ōsama kara Shakkin shita Otoko) The King talked about Borrowing the Man"	14 June 1982
The kids listen to Jesus telling the parables of the Good Samaritan and the Unforgiving Servant.
12	12	"Poor Little Rich Men (欲張りな金持ち, Yokubarina Kanemochi) Greedy Rich Man"	21 June 1982
The kids listen to Jesus telling the parables of the Rich Fool and the Prodigal Son.
13	13	"The Greatest (一番偉いのは誰だ, Ichiban erai no wa dareda) Who is the Greatest"	28 June 1982
The kids witness the Twelve Apostles arguing who among them is the greatest.
14	14	"Back From the Grave (墓から出てきた男, Haka kara Detekita Otoko) Cave man coming out"	5 July 1982
In Bethany, the kids witness Jesus at the home of Martha and Mary and Jesus raising Martha's and Mary's brother Lazarus from dead to life.
15	15	"Real Treasure (町中の嫌われ者, Machi naka no Kiraware mono) The town hater"	12 July 1982
In Jericho, the kids witness the conversion of Zacchaeus the tax collector.
16	16	"What If...? (土の中に埋めた金, Tsuchi no naka ni umeta kin) Ground where the Gold Buried"	19 July 1982
The kids listen to Jesus telling the parables of the Unprofitable Servant and the Wise and the Foolish Builders.
17	17	"The Lost Sheep (迷子になった羊, Maigo ni Natta Hitsuji) Lost Sheep"	26 July 1982
The kids listen to Jesus telling the parables of the Good Shepherd and the Workers in the Vineyard.
18	18	"Sour Grapes (奇跡の水がめ, Kiseki no Mizu game) Miraculous Water Jug"	2 August 1982
In Cana, the kids witness the first miracle of Jesus turning water into wine during a wedding.
19	19	"Dog Gone (小犬とパンくず, Koinu to Pan kuzu) Puppy and Breadcrumbs"	9 August 1982
In the region of Tyre and Sidon, the kids witness Jesus healing the Syrophoenician woman's daughter.
20	20	"Little Orphan Anna (二つの銅貨, Futatsu no Dōka) Two Copper Coins"	16 August 1982
At the Temple in Jerusalem, the kids witness Jesus telling the lesson about the poor widow's offering.
21	21	"A Word to the Wise (なまけ者の裁判官, Namake mono no Saibankan) The Lazy Judge"	23 August 1982
The kids listen to Jesus telling the parables of the Unjust Judge and the Wedding Feast.
22	22	"Judgement Day (天国と地獄, Tengoku to Jigoku) Heaven and Hell"	30 August 1982
The kids listen to Jesus telling the parables of the Rich man and Lazarus and the Unjust Steward.
23	23	"Possessed (悪霊の恐怖, Akuryō no Kyōfu) Fear of Evil Spirits"	6 September 1982
In the region of the Gerasenes, the kids witness Jesus healing the Gadarene Demoniac.
24	24	"Over the Hill (帰ってきたおじいちゃん, Kaettekita Ojīchan) Grandpa Returns"	13 September 1982
The kids witness Jesus cleansing ten lepers.
25	25	"True Friends (屋根から来た男, Yane kara kita Otoko) Roof enters the Man"	20 September 1982
In Capernaum, the kids witness Jesus healing a paralytic.
26	26	"Devil's Gate (生き返った息子, Ikikaetta Musuko) The resurrected Son"	27 September 1982
In Nain, the kids witness Jesus raising the widow's son from dead to life.

=== Season 2 (1982-1983) ===
No. overall	No. in season	Title	Original release date
27	1	"Well, Well, Well? (いのちの水, Inochi no Mizu) Life from the Water"	4 October 1982
Jesus meets a Samaritan woman at the well and promises her the gift of living water.
28	2	"Left Holding the Bag (池の水が動いた日, Ike no Mizu ga Ugoita Hi) The pool water moved in that day"	11 October 1982
Jesus heals a paralytic man on the pool of Bethesda during the Sabbath Day.
29	3	"Who Among You? (石を投げるのは誰だ, Ishi o Nageru no wa Dareda) The stone is throwing it, Who is it?"	18 October 1982
A Pharisee asks Jesus a question with regards to the stoning of an adulteress. Jesus and the woman taken in adultery.
30	4	"Oil and Water (70人の弟子, 70-ri no Deshi) 70 Disciples"	25 October 1982
Jesus sends his 12 disciples in pairs to preach the word of God and to perform miracles.
31	5	"A Special Secret (山上の変貌, Sanjō no Henbō) Mountain of Transfiguration"	1 November 1982
The Transfiguration and Jesus heals an epileptic boy.
32	6	"Midnight Callers (真夜中のパン, Mayo naka no Pan) Midnight Bread"	8 November 1982
Jesus teaches, "Ask and you shall receive. Seek and you shall find. Knock and the door will be opened to you." Jesus tells the parable of The Ten Maidens.
33	7	"What's it worth? (四粒の種, Shi Tsubu no Tane) Four Seeds"	15 November 1982
Jesus tells the Parable of the Sower.
34	8	"Fruitless, (ぶどう園のいちじく, Budō En no Ichijiku) Figs in the Vineyard"	22 November 1982
Jesus tells the parables of The Weeds and The Wicked Tenants.
35	9	"Fit For a King (ロバに乗った王様, Roba ni Notta Ōsama) The Donkey with the King"	29 November 1982
Jesus enters the city of Jerusalem.
36	10	"The Secret Agent (大祭司の悪だくみ, Dai Saishi no Waruda kumi) The High Priest's Evil Plan"	6 December 1982
Jesus cleanses the temple by driving the merchants out of the temple.
37	11	"The Preparation (香油の香り, Kōyu no Kaori) Fragrance of Perfume Oil"	13 December 1982
Mary of Bethany washes Jesus' feet with an alabaster box of expensive perfume and Jesus heals a blind man.
38	12	"Betrayed (裏切るのはあなただ, Uragiru no wa Anatada) You are the one who betrays me"	20 December 1982
Jesus washes the apostles' feet. Jesus and his twelve disciples are in the Last Supper. Jesus prays in the Garden of Gethsemane and Judas Iscariot betrays Jesus, sending him to Caiaphas.
39	13	"Who's in Charge (総督の苦悩, Sōtoku no Kunō) The Governor's Distress"	27 December 1982
Jesus is presented to Caiaphas, to King Herod Antipas, and to Pontius Pilate. Peter betrays Jesus by denying him thrice and the cock crows.
40	14	"The Crown of Thorns (いばらの冠, Ibara no Kanmuri) Crown of Thorns"	6 January 1983
Jesus is scourged at the pillar and put with a crown of thorns. Pilate frees Barabbas and sentenced Jesus to death by crucifixion.
41	15	"Golgotha (どくろの丘, Do Kuro no Oka) Skull Hill"	10 January 1983
Jesus carries his cross towards Golgotha and Simon of Cyrene is compelled to carry the cross before Jesus. Jesus is crucified, died, and buried.
42	16	"The Empty Tomb (ひらいた墓, Kiraiya Haka) Open Grave"	17 January 1983
Jesus' tomb is empty and Jesus is risen.
43	17	"With You Always (網いっぱいの魚, Ami Ippau no Sakana) Net full of Fish"	24 January 1983
Jesus appears as himself to two of his disciples in the road towards Emmaus. Seven of the disciples catch 153 fish and Jesus restored Peter. Jesus ascends to heaven.
44	18	"The Prison Break (天使と脱獄, Tenshi to Datsugoku) Angel and Escape"	31 January 1983
An angel helps Peter escape from prison.
45	19	"Good Riddance (ヘロデ王の最後, Herode Ō no Saigo) Herod being King has come to an End"	7 February 1983
The death of King Herod.
46	20	"The Blinding Light (光の中の不思議な声, Hikari no naka Fushigina Koe) The Light comes in, and a mysterious voice is heard"	14 February 1983
Saint Stephen is stoned and died. Jesus appears to Saul and is converted from being a persecutor of the believers to becoming an apostle of Christ.
47	21	"Bound & Rebound (とけた鎖, Toketa Kusari) Melted Chain"	21 February 1983
Saul, who is now called Paul, preaches the word of God in Macedonia and delivers a woman from an evil spirit. Paul and Silas are flogged in public and placed in prison, yet a severe earthquake occurred while they are in prison.
48	22	"Tender Grapes (窓から落ちた少年, Mado kara Ochita Shōnen) The Window opened, the fallen boy"	28 February 1983
Paul interferes in a mob and helps a man get justice.
49	23	"Shipwrecked (囚人船難破事件, Shūjinsen Nanpa Jiken) Convict Ship Wreck"	7 March 1983
Paul is shipwrecked in the island of Malta.
50	24	"Snake Bite (マムシに噛まれた男, Mamushi ni Kama reta Otoko) The viper bite the man"	14 March 1983
Paul is bitten by a snake but does not die. He heals a young girl from a severe illness.
51	25	"Heartbreak (逃げてきた召使, Nigete kita Meshitsukai) The Runaway Servant"	21 March 1983
The story of Onesimus, the slave of Philemon.
52	26	"Homeward Bound (やっと戻れたトンデラハウス, Yatto modoreta Tondera Hausu) Finally back at The Flying House"	28 March 1983
Paul writes Philemon to take back Onesimus, who is baptized and converted as a follower of Christ. The Flying House finally returns to the 20th century after its treks through the times of Ancient Israel.

== Home video and syndication ==
The Flying House was available on VHS by Tyndale; all 52 episodes were released over 26 VHS cassettes. A DVD volume of The Flying House was released by Vision Video in 2006, featuring the first four episodes. In 2010, the Christian Broadcasting Network made the 52 episodes available for viewing online. The series also aired on the Trinity Broadcasting Network (TBN) and its children's subchannel Smile.

== Multilanguage List ==
- Arabic: المنزل الطائر
- Arabic (Islamic): المنزل الطائر
- French: La maison volante
- Canadian French- La maison volante
- Korean: 타임교실 톤데라하우스의 대모험
- German: Fliegendes Haus
- Spanish: La casa voladora
- Chinese: 飛行之家/飛行屋/親子劇場：大冒險/時光飛屋
- Russian: Летающий дом
- Ukrainian: Літаючий будинок
- Romanian: Casa Zburătoare
- Danish: Det Flyvende Hus
- Hungarian: A repülő ház
- Mongolian: Нисдэг байшин
- Hebrew: הבית המעופף
- Brazilian Portuguese: A Casa Voadora
- Italian: Il Vangelo per i bambini
- Finnish: Lentävä talo
- Turkish: Uçan ev
- Czech: Létající dům
- Poland: Latający dom

== See also ==
- Superbook
- In the Beginning: The Bible Stories
- The Greatest Adventure: Stories from the Bible
