= Ki Fighter Taerang =

- Starring: Jeong Mi Sook; Sayaka Aida
- Country of origin: South Korea; Japan
- No. of episodes: 26

Production
- Running time: 30 min.

Original release
- Network: MBC/NHK
- Release: August 21, 2002 – March 19, 2003

Ki Fighter Taerang (Korean: 기파이터 태랑; RR: Gipaiteo Taerang) (Japanese: キ・ファイターテラン, Hepburn: Ki Faitā Teran) is a Japanese-South Korean anime series. It is a product of the major anime broadcaster Munhwa Broadcasting Corporation and NHK, and the animation was done by Production Grimi. The director of this anime is Minoguchi Katuya. The story centers on the character Taerang, a legendary fighter squirrel. The series is noted for bearing slight similarities to Jing: King of Bandits.

== Characters ==
The following are the names of the characters in Romanised form, followed by their Korean and Japanese transcriptions.

- Taerang (태랑, テラン)
- Tible (티블, ティプル)
- Chichia (치치아, チチア)
- Rami (라미, ラミ)
- Para (파라, パラ)
- Niverse (니버스, ニバス)
- Trueno (트레노, トレノ)
- Volvoy (볼보이, ボールボーイ)
- Big Magic Kong (대마왕; 大魔王)

== Voice actors ==
=== Japanese version ===
- Taerang-Sayaka Aida
- Tible-Saeko Chiba
- Chichia-Runa Akiyama
- Rami-Sanae Kobayashi
- Trueno, Volvoy-Nina Kumagaya

=== Korean version ===
- Taerang-Jeong Mi Sook
- Tible-Cha Myeong Hwa
- Chichia-Lim Eun Jeong
