= Takayuki Hattori =

Japanese conductor and composer (born 1965)

- 服部隆之
- Born: November 21, 1965 (age 60); Tokyo, Japan
- Education: Conservatoire de Paris
- Occupations: Composer; arranger; conductor
- Years active: 1988–present
- Spouse: Eri Okamoto
- Children: Moné Hattori
- Parent: Katsuhisa Hattori (father)
- Relatives: Ryōichi Hattori (grandfather)

Takayuki Hattori (服部 隆之, Hattori Takayuki; born November 21, 1965) is a Japanese film, television, video game and non-soundtrack music composer, arranger and conductor.

== Family ==
Hattori was born into a prominent musical family. His grandfather was composer Ryoichi Hattori, often regarded as a pioneer of Japanese popular music, and his father was composer Katsuhisa Hattori. His daughter, violinist Moné Hattori, is also a professional musician.

== Education ==
Hattori studied composition and orchestration at the Conservatoire de Paris, graduating in 1988. He then returned to Japan, where he has worked since.

== Career ==
After returning to Japan from his studies in France, Hattori began working across a wide range of media, including film, television, and popular music. He gained recognition for his orchestral scoring style in both live-action films and television dramas, and has since become a prolific composer for anime and major Japanese film productions.

== Style ==
Hattori's compositions frequently make use of orchestral instrumentation, particularly brass and string sections, and are often recorded with full orchestral ensembles. He has stated that this tendency is not the result of a fixed personal style, but has developed in part due to expectations from clients.

Hattori has expressed a preference for composing music for visual media, describing music and imagery as having a mutually reinforcing relationship. His influences include American film composers such as John Williams, James Horner, and Alan Silvestri.

He is also an admirer of Gabriel Fauré, having developed an appreciation for his work through classes at the Paris Conservatoire, and has been noted for incorporating smaller ensemble textures in a similar vein.

== Works ==
=== Anime ===
- Slayers (films and OAV series)
- Martian Successor Nadesico (TV series and film)
- Battle Athletes
- Code:Breaker
- Ground Defense Force! Mao-chan
- Sister Princess

=== Anime films ===
- Godzilla: Planet of the Monsters
- Godzilla: City on the Edge of Battle
- Godzilla: The Planet Eater
- Doraemon (film series composer, 2018–present)
  - Doraemon: Nobita's Treasure Island (2018)
  - Doraemon: Nobita's Chronicle of the Moon Exploration (2019)
  - Doraemon: Nobita's New Dinosaur (2020)
  - Doraemon: Nobita's Little Star Wars 2021 (2022)
  - Doraemon: Nobita's Sky Utopia (2023)
  - Doraemon: Nobita's Earth Symphony (2024)
- Paris ni Saku Étoile

=== Live-action films ===
- Space Brothers live action film adaptation
- Rough live action film adaptation
- Godzilla 2000
- Godzilla vs. SpaceGodzilla
- Welcome Back, Mr. McDonald

=== Television dramas ===
- Great Teacher Onizuka
- Hero
- Nodame Cantabile
- Hanzawa Naoki
- Shinsengumi!
- Downtown Rocket

=== Other television ===
- Hook Book Row
- Japan Record Awards(Orchestrator)

=== Video games ===
- Arc the Lad: Twilight of the Spirits
- Sangokushi V
- Intelligent Qube

=== Music collaborations ===
- JAM Project – orchestral arranger and conductor
  - Victoria Cross
  - Thumb Rise Again
  - Live concerts supporting the above albums

== Awards ==
Hattori has won three Japan Academy Prize awards in the category Outstanding Achievement in Music and was the music director of the Japan Pavilion at the Expo 2010.
