= Superbook (1981 TV series) =

Japanese animated series Kenji Yoshida

- Cover of the first DVD volume
- Also known as: Animated Parent and Child Theatre
- アニメ 親子劇場; Anime Oyako Gekijō
- Genre: Christian
- Written by: Kikaku Shimamura
- Directed by: Masakazu Higuchi
- Music by: Masahito Maruyama; Masayuki Chiyo
- Country of origin: Japan
- Original language: Japanese
- No. of seasons: 2
- No. of episodes: 52

Production
- Executive producer: Kenji Yoshida (Tatsunoko Production)
- Producers: Hyota Ezu (TV Tokyo); Akira Inoue
- Production companies: TV Tokyo; Tatsunoko Production

Original release
- Network: TV Tokyo
- Release: October 9, 1981 – September 26, 1983

Related
- Superbook (2011 TV series)

Superbook (スーパーブック, Sūpābukku), also known as Animated Parent and Child Theatre (アニメ 親子劇場, Anime Oyako Gekijō), is a Japanese Christian anime television series from 1981, initially produced by Tatsunoko Productions for TV Tokyo in Japan in conjunction with the Christian Broadcasting Network in the United States. The Japanese opening song is "The TimeBook Song" (タイムブークの歌, Taimu Būku no Uta) by Ryō Miyauchi and the Japanese ending song is "My Fun Friends" (ゆかいな仲間たち, Yukai na Nakama tachi) by Fusako Fujimoto. The English opening song of the first season of the 1981 edition of Superbook is "Oh Superbook" by Stephan Peppos and the English ending song is "Su-su-super" by Stephan Peppos.

The series chronicles the events of the Bible's Old and New Testaments in its 52-episode run. The first 26 episodes aired from October 9, 1981, to March 29, 1982, in Japan, followed by a second season called Superbook II: In Search for Ruffles and Return to the 20th Century (パソコントラベル探偵団, Pasokon Toraberu Tanteidan; lit. Personal Computer Travel Detective Team) with 26 episodes from April 4 to September 26, 1983. The Japanese opening song is "Personal Computer Travel Detective Team (パソコントラベル探偵団, Pasokon Toraberu Tanteidan) by Ritsuko Ōwada. The Japanese ending song is "Lyndon Bell: Song of the Wind" (リンドンベル・風の唄, Rindon Beru ･ Fū no Uta) by Yumi Okuhata, and the English opening song of "Superbook II: In Search For Ruffles And Return To The 20th Century" is "Superbook II" by Stephan Peppos. Its instrumental version serves the ending theme. Between both series in the first run was the companion series The Flying House.

== Overview ==
The 1981 edition of Superbook (Anime Oyako Gekijo) begins at the home of a young boy named Christopher "Chris" Peeper, who discovers the ancient Bible named Superbook that can speak and send him, his friend Joy and his clockwork toy figure named Gizmo the Crusader Robot back in time during the events of the Old and New Testaments.

The second season, Superbook II: In Search for Ruffles and Return to the 20th Century (Pasokon Travel Tanteidan), takes place two years after the first season, where Superbook falls onto a computer. Its contents and powers are absorbed into the system, giving anybody the ability to see into the past from Christopher's home via the monitor. Ruffles, his poodle, has managed to get lost in time, prompting Gizmo and Christopher's little brother (re-written as his cousin in the English dub), Uriah "Uri" Peeper, to search for Ruffles. While Chris and Joy keep watch and control of the computer from the present, Gizmo and Uri experience the stories from the Old Testament solely, later in episode 25, Gizmo and Uri have found Ruffles at last. In episodes 25 and 26, Chris' Uncle Ken (Uri's father in the English dub), a computer programmer, keeps watch and fixes the problems on the computer and with Gizmo's time-travel abilities. Chris and Joy experience two more stories from the Old Testament with Gizmo and Uri.

== Cast and characters ==
- Christopher "Chris" Peeper (飛鳥翔, Asuka Shō) (voiced by Masako Sugaya in Japanese during Season 1, and Asami Mukaidono in Japanese during Season 2, Billie Lou Watt in English): The main hero of the series, who is Professor Peeper's son and Gizmo's former owner.
- Joy (大和あずさ, Yamato Azusa) (voiced by Katsue Miwa in Japanese during Season 1, and Takako Tsutsui in Japanese during Season 2, Sonia Owens in English): Chris's next-door neighbor and best friend.
- Gizmo the Crusading Robot (ゼンマイジカケ, Zenmaijikake) (voiced by Hiroshi Masuoka in Japanese, Helena van Koert and Billie Lou Watt in English): The name of two characters, depending on the season. In the 1st season, he is Chris's advanced wind-up toy robot figure who can become a real-life robot. In the second season, Gizmo becomes a real-life sized robot built by Uri's father.
- Uriah "Uri" Peeper (飛鳥悠, Asuka Yū) (voiced by Runa Akiyama in Japanese, Helena van Koert in English): Chris's little brother (cousin in the English dub) and Gizmo's current owner.
- Professor Frederick "Fred" Peeper (あすかはかせ, Asuka Hakase) (voiced by Fumio Matsuoka in Japanese, Ray Owens in English): An archaeologist and Chris's father.
- Phoebe Peeper (飛鳥さつき, Asuka Satsuki) (voiced by Kumiko Takizawa in Japanese, Sonia Owens in English): Chris's mother.
- Ken Peeper (飛鳥研, Asuka Ken): who works the computer and later he fixes the problem.
- Ruffles (キッチョム, Kicchomu) in Japanese: Chris and Uri's pet Yorkshire Terrier.
- Superbook (タイムブック, Taimu bukku) (voiced by Koji Totani in Japanese, Ray Owens in English): An ancient Bible that takes Chris, Joy, Gizmo and Uri back to the Old and New Testament periods or eras.
- Narrator (ナレーション, Narēshon) (voiced by Mahito Tsujimura in Japanese, Ray Owens in English): who narrates the title card, and the story.

== Episodes ==
| Series | Episodes | Originally released | | |
| Series | Episodes | First released | Last released | Network |
|---|---|---|---|---|
| 1 | 26 | October 9, 1981 | March 29, 1982 | TV Tokyo (Japan); CBN (United States) |
| 2 | 26 | April 4, 1983 | September 26, 1983 | TV Tokyo (Japan); CBN (United States) |

=== Season 1 (1981–82) ===
| No. overall | No. in series | Title | Scripture reference(s) | Directed by | Written by | Original release date |
|---|---|---|---|---|---|---|
| 1 | 1 | "How It All Began" "(アダムとエバ物語, Adamu to Eba Monogatari) Adam and Eve Story" | Genesis Chapters 1-3 | Masakazu Higuchi | Akiyoshi Sakai | October 9, 1981 |
| 2 | 2 | "My Brother's Keeper" "(カインとアベル物語, Kain to Aberu Monogatari) Cain and Abel Story" | Genesis Chapter 4 | Masakazu Higuchi | Akiyoshi Sakai | October 16, 1981 |
| 3 | 3 | "The Flood" "(ノアの箱舟物語, Noa no Hakobune Monogatari) Noah's Ark Story" | Genesis Chapters 6-9 | Masakazu Higuchi (supervising) | Kiichi Takagi | October 23, 1981 |
| 4 | 4 | "The Test" "(偉大な父の物語, Idai na Chichi no Monogatari) Great Father's Story" | Genesis Chapters 21-22 | Masakazu Higuchi (supervising) | Yuriko Fujii | October 30, 1981 |
| 5 | 5 | "Here Comes the Bride" "(他国の花嫁物語, Takoku no Hanayome Monogatari) Foreign's Bridge Story" | Genesis Chapter 24 | Masakazu Higuchi (supervising) | Yuriko Fujii | November 6, 1981 |
| 6 | 6 | "Double Trouble" "(ふたごの兄弟物語, Futago no Kyōdai Monogatari) Twins' Brother Story" | Genesis Chapters 25-28 | Shoichi Yasumura | Ryoko Takagi | November 13, 1981 |
| 7 | 7 | "A Dream Come True" "(エジプト物語, Ejiputo Monogatari) Egypt Story" | Genesis Chapters 37-50 | Ryoji Fujiwara | Kiichi Takayama | November 20, 1981 |
| 8 | 8 | "The Miracle Rod" "(奇跡のつえ物語, Kiseki no Tsue Monogatari) Miracle's Rod Story" | Exodus Chapters 1-19 | Osamu Sekita | Kazuo Satou | November 27, 1981 |
| 9 | 9 | "Those Amazing Trumpets" "(不思議なラッパ物語, Fushigi na Rappa Monogatari) Mysterious Trumpet Story" | Joshua Chapters 1-6 | Kenjiro Yoshida | Naoko Miyake | December 4, 1981 |
| 10 | 10 | "Pitchers of Fire" "(300個のツボ物語, 300 ko no Tsubo Monogatari) 300 Acupressure's Point Story" | Judges Chapters 6-8 | Masakazu Higuchi (supervising) | Ryoko Takagi | December 11, 1981 |
| 11 | 11 | "Muscleman" "(怪力物語, Kairiki Monogatari) Superhuman Strength Story" | Judges Chapters 13-16 | Masakazu Higuchi (supervising) | Saburo Ebinuma | December 18, 1981 |
| 12 | 12 | "The First Christmas" "(馬小屋物語, Uma Goya Monogatari) Stable Story" | Matthew Chapters 1-2; Luke Chapter 2 | Masakazu Higuchi (supervising) | Ryoko Takagi | December 25, 1981 |
| 13 | 13 | "Miracles of Love" "(イエスの奇跡物語, Iesu no Kiseki Monogatari) Jesus' Miracles Story" | Luke Chapters 2-18; Matthew Chapters 3-20; Mark Chapters 1-10; John Chapters 1-11 | Masakazu Higuchi (supervising) | Naoko Miyake | December 30, 1981 |
| 14 | 14 | "The Best News Yet" "(からっぽの墓物語, Karappo no Haka Monogatari) Empty Grave Story" | Matthew Chapters 21-28; Mark Chapters 11-16; Luke Chapters 19-24; John Chapters 12-21 | Masakazu Higuchi (supervising) | Naoko Miyake | January 4, 1982 |
| 15 | 15 | "Mother's Day" "(親孝行物語, Oya Kōkō Monogatari) Filial Piety Story" | Ruth Chapters 1-4 | Shoichi Yasumura | Kiichi Takayama | January 11, 1982 |
| 16 | 16 | "The Patience of Job" "(悪魔の誘惑物語, Akuma no Yūwaku Monogatari) Devil's Temptation Story" | Job Chapters 1-42 | You Kitazato | Saburo Ebinuma | January 18, 1982 |
| 17 | 17 | "Big Fish and Little Fish" "(鯨にのまれた物語, Kujita ni Noma reta Otoko no Monogatari) Whale Swallowed Man's Story" | Jonah Chapters 1-4 | Kenjiro Yoshida | Ryoko Takagi | January 25, 1982 |
| 18 | 18 | "The First King" "(ロバ国王物語, Roba Koku Ō Monogatari) Donkey King's Story" | 1 Samuel Chapters 8-10 | Norio Yazawa | Saburo Ebinuma | February 1, 1982 |
| 19 | 19 | "The Giant Killer" "(ダビデ物語, Dabide Monogatari) David's Story" | 1 Samuel Chapters 16-24 | Kenjiro Yoshida | Tsutomu Kawauchi | February 8, 1982 |
| 20 | 20 | "Superbrain" "(ソロモン王物語, Soromon Ō Monogatari) Solomon's King Story" | 1 Kings Chapters 1-10 | Ryoji Fujiwara | Naoko Miyake | February 15, 1982 |
| 21 | 21 | "A True Prophet" "(預言者エリヤ物語, Yogensha Eriya Monogatari) Prophet Elijah's Story" | 1 Kings Chapters 17-18 | Kenjiro Yoshida | Kiichi Takayama | February 22, 1982 |
| 22 | 22 | "Flaming Chariots" "(火の戦車物語, Hi no Sensha Monogatari) Chariot of Fire Story" | 2 Kings Chapters 2-7 | Norio Yazawa | Kiichi Takayama | March 1, 1982 |
| 23 | 23 | "The Lion's Den" "(ライオンの穴物語, Raion no Ana Monogatari) Lion's Den Story" | Daniel Chapters 1-6 | Kimiharu Oguma | Ryoko Takagi | March 8, 1982 |
| 24 | 24 | "Nehemiah and the Walls of Jerusalem" "(輝く城壁物語, Kagayaku Jōheki Monogatari) Shining Wall Story" | Nehemiah Chapters 1-7 | Ryoji Fujiwara | Kazuo Satou | March 15, 1982 |
| 25 | 25 | "The Beauty Queen" "(美しい王妃の物語, Utsukushī Ōhi no Monogatari) Beautiful Queen's Story" | Esther Chapters 1-10 | Kazuo Yamazaki | Nobuko Morita | March 22, 1982 |
| 26 | 26 | "The Mighty Convert" "(世界の果てまで物語, Sekai no Hate made Monogatari) Worlds to the End Story" | Acts Chapters 6-28 | Kenjiro Yoshida | Saburo Ebinuma | March 29, 1982 |

=== Season 2 (1983) ===
| No. overall | No. in series | Title | Scripture reference(s) | Directed by | Written by | Original release date |
|---|---|---|---|---|---|---|
| 27 | 1 | "Where, Oh Where..." "(誕生！パソコン探偵団, Tanjō! Pasokon Tanteidan) Birth! Personal Computer Detective Team" | Genesis Chapters 13-17 | Masakazu Higuchi | Ryoko Takagi | April 4, 1983 |
| 28 | 2 | "Hot Dog" "(大炎上！悪の街 ソドム, Dai Enjō! Aku no Machi Sodomu) Burning! City with Evil, Sodom" | Genesis Chapters 18-20 | Masakazu Higuchi | Ryoko Takagi | April 11, 1983 |
| 29 | 3 | "The Test of Faith" "(悲しみの短剣, Kanashimi no Tanken) Dagger of Sorrow" | Genesis Chapter 21 | Masakazu Higuchi | Kenji Kubota | April 18, 1983 |
| 30 | 4 | "Love at First Sight" "(井戸端の花嫁, Idobata no Hanayome) Well Chat's Bride" | Genesis Chapter 24 | Masakazu Higuchi | Kenji Kubota | April 25, 1983 |
| 31 | 5 | "Father's Pet" "(おじぎをする麦束, Ojigi o Suru Magitaba) Bowing Wheat Sheaf" | Genesis Chapters 35-37 | Masakazu Higuchi | Ryoko Takagi | May 2, 1983 |
| 32 | 6 | "All About Dreams" "(王様の不思議な夢, Ōsama no Fushigi na Yume) The King's Strange Dream" | Genesis Chapters 38-41 | Masakazu Higuchi | Ryoko Takagi | May 9, 1983 |
| 33 | 7 | "The Hostage" "(エジプト一番の知恵者, Ejiputo ichiban no Chiesha) Egypt, One's Wisest Man" | Genesis Chapter 42 | Masakazu Higuchi | Haruya Yamazaki | May 16, 1983 |
| 34 | 8 | "The Family Reunion" "(再会！涙の12人兄弟, Saikai! Namida no 12-ri Kyōdai) Reunion! Tears from 12 Brothers" | Genesis Chapters 43-50 | Masakazu Higuchi | Haruya Yamazaki | May 23, 1983 |
| 35 | 9 | "A Gift From Heaven" "(川に捨てられた赤ちゃん, Kawa ni Sute rareta Aka-chan) River, Baby Abandoned" | Exodus Chapters 1-2 | Masakazu Higuchi | Yuriko Fujii | May 30, 1983 |
| 36 | 10 | "The Burning Bush" "(炎の中の不思議な声, Honō no Naka no Fushigi na Koe) Flames Indoors Mysterious Voice" | Exodus Chapters 3-7 | Masakazu Higuchi | Kenji Kubota | June 6, 1983 |
| 37 | 11 | "No More Plagues" "(襲いくる十の災難, Osoi Kuru jū no Sainan) Strike Ten's Disasters" | Exodus Chapters 8-14 | Masakazu Higuchi | Kenji Kubota | June 13, 1983 |
| 38 | 12 | "So You Want To Go Back To Egypt!" "(荒野の大放浪, Kōya no Daihōrō) Wilderness' Wandering" | Exodus Chapters 14-40; Leviticus Chapters 1-27 | Masakazu Higuchi | Takao Koyama | June 20, 1983 |
| 39 | 13 | "Snakes and a Donkey" "(燃える蛇と青銅の蛇, Moeru Hebi to Seidōno Hebi) Flaming Serpent and Bronze Serpent" | Numbers Chapters 1-36; Deuteronomy Chapters 1-34; Joshua Chapters 1-6 | Masakazu Higuchi | Takao Koyama | June 27, 1983 |
| 40 | 14 | "Worth Fighting For" "(試された若者たち, Tamesareta Wakamono Tachi) Young People Put to the Test" | Judges Chapter 3 | Masakazu Higuchi | Nobuko Morita | July 4, 1983 |
| 41 | 15 | "The Good Left Arm" "(左利きの正義の剣, Hidari Kiki no Seigi no Ken) Left Hand's Sword of Justice" | Judges Chapter 3 | Masakazu Higuchi (Supervising) | Ryoko Takagi | July 11, 1983 |
| 42 | 16 | "Stuck In The Mud" "(大爆破！900台の鉄戦車, Dai Bakuda! 900-dai no Tetsu Sensha) Huge Explosion! 900 Iron Tanks" | Judges Chapters 4-5 | Masakazu Higuchi (Supervising) | Kenji Kubota | July 18, 1983 |
| 43 | 17 | "That's A Promise" "(英雄の涙, Eiyū no Namida) Hero's Tears" | Judges Chapter 11 | Masakazu Higuchi (Supervising) | Yuriko Fujii | July 25, 1983 |
| 44 | 18 | "Just Rewards" "(神と話した少年, Kami to Hanashita Shōnen) God Talked to the Boy" | 1 Samuel Chapters 1-7 | Masakazu Higuchi (Supervising) | Ryoko Takagi | August 1, 1983 |
| 45 | 19 | "A Wonderful Gift" "(はじめての王様, Hajimete no Ōsama) First King" | 1 Samuel Chapters 8-15 | Masakazu Higuchi (Supervising) | Ryoko Takagi | August 8, 1983 |
| 46 | 20 | "The Mighty Little Shepherd" "(羊飼いの少年ダビデ, Hitsujikai no Shōnen Dabide) Shepard's Boy, David" | 1 Samuel Chapter 16 | Masakazu Higuchi (Supervising) | Masakazu Higuchi | August 15, 1983 |
| 47 | 21 | "The Bigger They Come" "(巨人・ゴリアテとの対決, Kyojin ･ Goriate tono Taiketsu) Giant ･ Goliath's Confronting" | 1 Samuel Chapter 17 | Masakazu Higuchi (Supervising) | Masakazu Higuchi | August 22, 1983 |
| 48 | 22 | "Faithful and True" "(王子おたずね者, Ōji to Ota Zune Mono) Prince and Wanted Man" | 1 Samuel Chapters 18-24 | Masakazu Higuchi (Supervising) | Yuriko Fujii | August 29, 1983 |
| 49 | 23 | "David the King" "(ダビデ王誕生, Dabide Ō Tanjō) David, King's Birth" | 1 Samuel Chapters 25-31; 2 Samuel Chapters 1-2 | Masakazu Higuchi (Supervising) | Takao Koyama | September 5, 1983 |
| 50 | 24 | "In All His Glory" "(大王の後継者ソロモン, Dai Ō no Kōkeisha Soromon) Successor of the Great King, Solomon" | 1 Kings Chapters 1-10 | Masakazu Higuchi (supervising) | Haruya Yamazaki | September 12, 1983 |
| 51 | 25 | "The Wicked Queen" "(女王の陰謀, Joō no Inbō) Queen's Conspiracy" | 2 Kings Chapter 11 | Masakazu Higuchi (Supervising) | Nobuko Morita | September 19, 1983 |
| 52 | 26 | "A Matter of Time" "(一夜の大勝利, Ichiya no Dai Shōri) One Night's Big Win" | 2 Kings Chapters 18-19 | Masakazu Higuchi (Supervising) | Ryoko Takagi | September 26, 1983 |

== VHS/DVD releases ==
Superbook Season I and Season II were released on various VHS volumes by Tyndale Entertainment. The entire series was available over 26 VHS volumes. Superbook was released for the first time on DVD late 2005 to early 2006. The three DVD volumes features 4 episodes each from Season I.

As in July 2025, the 1981 edition of Superbook is featured on the Yippee TV streaming service.

== Multilanguage list ==
- Arabic: الكتاب الفائق
- Bulgarian: Книга на книгите
- Chinese :親子劇場/PC 旅行侦探
- Filipino: Superbook
- Finnish: Superkirja
- French: SuperLivre
- Korean: 성경만화 슈퍼북
- German: Superbuch
- Hungarian: Könyvek könyve
- Indonesian: Superbook
- Italian: Superbook
- Polish: Superksięga
- Portuguese: Superbook
- Romanian: Cartea Cărților
- Russian: Суперкнига
- Spanish: Superlibro
- Swedish: Böckernas bok
- Ukrainian: Суперкнига

== See also ==
- The Flying House
- In the Beginning: The Bible Stories
