= Eri Sugai =

Eri Sugai (菅井えり, Sugai Eri, 1961 – December 21, 2016) was a Japanese vocalist, composer and arranger. She has been compared to Enya in that she "multitracked her voice into angelic choruses, soaring over spare but emotional arrangements", She lent her talents to more than 1,000 television commercials, and produced five solo albums, in addition to one under the name of Stella Mirus and two with her husband, Itaru Watanabe, from 2000 until her death. In 2017, Universal Japan released her album, Skip!, recorded in 1986, a 10-track album of 'Light Mellow' music. There is also an edition called Skip! +4 which contains four bonus tracks.

== Discography ==
=== Mai ===
Released January 9, 2001 by Pacific Moon.

1. Horizon
2. Honen Bushi (ft. Anna Sato)
3. Konjaku Monogatari (Stories, modern and ancient)
4. Aqua
5. A Lullaby of Takeda
6. First Love
7. Mai
8. Rakuen
9. A Song of Birth
10. China Rose

=== Kaori ===
Released April 12, 2005 by Pacific Moon.

1. Voyage to Asia
2. Iroha Song
3. Breath of Earth
4. Teinsagu nu Hana
5. Silence
6. Etenraku
7. Eternal Prayer
8. Ancient City
9. Kunino Sazuchi
10. Fragrance
11. Voyage to Asia (A Cappella Version)

=== Air ===
A collaboration with Stella Mirus. Released August 19, 2000 by Pacific Garden.

1. Air (For The G String) (Johann Sebastian Bach)
2. Gymnopédies No.1 (Erik Satie)
3. In Your Arms
4. Sonata Für Klavier Nr.14 (Ludwig van Beethoven)
5. Aquamarin
6. Stẽlla
7. Siciliana (Gabriel Fauré)
8. Tableaux d'une exposition (Modest Petrovich Mussorgsky)
9. Silent Love

=== Stẽlla Mirus II ===
1. Sunshine Filtering through Foliage
2. Adagio (Tomaso Albinoni)
3. Cuckoo
4. Menuett BWV Anh.114〜BWV115 (Johann Sebastian Bach)
5. Pray
6. Die Moldau (Bedřich Smetana)
7. A Drop of a Moonlit Night
8. Kanon (Johann Pachelbel)
9. Toy's Night
10. A Star Clock
11. Pure

=== Kokoro No Niwa ===
1. Genji Millennia Story
2. Into a Sleep
3. Heart of Earth
4. Far an Away Journey
5. Juvenile Mind
6. Miracle of Time
7. Beginning
8. Spirit of Forest
9. Mirage
10. Tapestry

=== Stẽlla Mirus III ===
1. Share Pain
2. Our Music (Eri Ver.)
3. With a Wish
4. Pray In The Night
5. Shooting Star
6. Arcadia
7. AOZORA
8. Sound Of Music (The Sound Of Music)
9. My Favorite Things
10. Space
11. Under a Quiet Wave

== Collaborations ==
She also released two albums with her husband Itaru Watanabe, entitled "Erital Christmas" in 2008 and "Erital Pops" in 2016.

== Death ==
She died on 21 December 2016 after being diagnosed with, and receiving treatment for, pancreatic cancer.
