= Akio Hattori =

Japanese mathematician

- Born: 1929; Tokyo
- Died: August 25, 2013 (aged 84)
- Education: University of Tokyo
- Known for: Hattori–Stong theorem
- Scientific career
- Fields: Mathematics
- Workplaces: University of Tokyo; Meiji University
- Doctoral advisor: Shokichi Iyanaga

Akio Hattori (服部 晶夫, Hattori Akio; born in Tokyo in 1929, died on 25 August 2013 due to submandibular gland cancer.) was a Japanese mathematician working in algebraic topology who proved the Hattori–Stong theorem. Hattori was the president of the Mathematical Society of Japan in 1989–1991.

Hattori received a Doctorate in Science from the University of Tokyo in 1959 with Shokichi Iyanaga as his advisor. He then joined the faculty of the University of Tokyo. Between 1966 and 1968 Hattori worked as a visiting scholar at both Johns Hopkins University and Yale University.

After retirement from University of Tokyo, Hattori was invited to teach at Meiji University from 1991 to 1999, when they opened mathematics major in 1989. Professor Hiroko Morimoto invited Drs. Akio Hattori and Hiroshi Fujita from the University of Tokyo, and Dr. Shiro Goto from Nihon University joined to launch a research and educational system for algebra, geometry and analytics.

== Publications ==
- Hattori, Akio (1966), "Integral characteristic numbers for weakly almost complex manifolds", Topology, 5 (3): 259–280, doi:10.1016/0040-9383(66)90010-3, ISSN 0040-9383, MR 0192517
- "Smooth S^{1}-action and Bordism (Geometry of Manifolds)" (PDF). RIMS Kokyuroku. 158. Kyoto University: 30–35. August 1972. ISSN 1880-2818.
- "Involution o motsu tayō-tai ni okeru Nakaoka no Coincidence Theorem ni tsuite (gunsayō o motsu tayō-tai no toporojī)" [About Coincidence Theorem in Nakaoka in manifold with Involution (topology of manifold with group action)] (PDF). RIMS Kokyuroku (in Japanese). 203. Kyoto University: 109–121. February 1974. ISSN 1880-2818. OCLC 996633389.
- "The Fixed Point Set of an Involution and Theorems of the Borsuk-Ulam Type" (PDF). RIMS Kokyuroku. 221. Kyoto University: 38–46. August 1974. ISSN 1880-2818.
- "Lifting Compact Group Actions in Fiber Bundles (Conversion group and cohomology theory)" (PDF). RIMS Kokyuroku. 246. Kyoto University: 51–55. July 1975. ISSN 1880-2818. OCLC 996633801.
- "Kohomorojī fukuso shaei kūkan-jō no S^{1} sayō (dōhen homotopī-ron)" [S^{1}-action on the cohomologic complex projection space (same homotopy theory)] (PDF). RIMS Kokyuroku (in Japanese). 319. Kyoto University: 20–25. February 1978. ISSN 1880-2818. OCLC 996632606.
- "Almost complex S^{1}-action" (PDF). RIMS Kokyuroku (in Japanese). 605. Kyoto University: 38–46. February 1987. ISSN 1880-2818. OCLC 996609177.

=== Co-authored ===
- Taniguchi, Hajime (December 1971). "S^{1}-sayō no koborudizumu (koborudizumu riron)" [S^{1}-action and Cobordism (cobordism theory)] (PDF). RIMS Kokyuroku (in Japanese). 131. Kyoto University: 104–121. ISSN 1880-2818. OCLC 996635159.
- Kawakubo, Katsuo; Uchida, Fuichi; Imoto, Michiko; Oikawa, Kumiko; Abe, Kojun; Komiya, Katsuhiro; Yoshida, Tomoyoshi; Kitada, Yasuhiko; Kawasaki, Tetsuro; Shibata, Katsuyuki; Kamata, Masayoshi; Nakaoka, Minoru (February 1974). "Puroburemu sesshon no matome (gunsayō o motsu tayō-tai no toporojī)" [Summary of Problem Session (topology of manifolds with group action)] (PDF). RIMS Kokyuroku (in Japanese). 203. Kyoto University: 101–108. ISSN 1880-2818. OCLC 996633225.
