= Moné Hattori =

Japanese violinist (born 1999)

- 服部 百音
- Born: September 14, 1999 (age 26); Tokyo, Japan
- Education: Bron Academy; Toho Gakuen School of Music
- Occupation: Violinist
- Parent: Takayuki Hattori (father)
- Relatives: Katsuhisa Hattori (grandfather); Ryōichi Hattori (great-grandfather)
- Musical career
- Genres: Classical
- Instrument: Violin
- Website: monehattori.com

Moné Hattori (服部 百音, Hattori Mone; born September 14, 1999) is a Japanese violinist. She was the first-prize winner of the 11th Lipinski and Wieniawski Competition for Young Violinists in Lublin, Poland. She was also the first-prize winner of the 7th International Competition for Young Violinists in Novosibirsk, Russia. She is the daughter of Takayuki Hattori, granddaughter of Katsuhisa Hattori, and great-granddaughter of Ryōichi Hattori.

== Biography ==
Moné Hattori was born into a musical family in Tokyo, Japan. Hattori started studying the violin at the age of five with Goro Masuda; a year later, she studied under Akuri Suzuki. At the age of eight, Hattori gave her recital debut with orchestra with the Saint-Saëns Violin concerto. Since then, she has performed numerous recitals. As of 2020, Hattori studies under Zahkar Bron at the Bron Academy, as well as Akiko Tatsumi at the Toho Gakuen School of Music. Her solo debuts include the Deutsches Symphonie-Orchester Berlin, Osaka Philharmonic, Tokyo Philharmonic, Osaka Symphony and the Franz Liszt Chamber Orchestra.

Hattori currently plays on a 1743 Pietro Guarneri violin loaned from the Ueno Fine Chemicals Industry, Ltd.

== Awards and appearances ==
- 2009: First prize, 11th Lipinski and Wieniawski Competition for Young Violinists, Lublin, Poland
- 2013: Grand Prix, 9th International Competition "Young Virtuosos", Bulgaria
- 2013: First prize, 7th International Competition for Young Violinists, Novosibirsk, Russia
- 2015: Grand Prix, Boris Goldstein International Violin Competition, Bern, Switzerland
- First prize, Japan Arts Competition
- Vladimir Ashkenazy and Vadim Repin Debut at the Trans-Siberian Art Festival

== Discography ==
- 2016/2019: Waxman Carmen Fantasy and Shostakovich Violin Concerto No.1 (Avex Classics)
- 2020: Recital (Avex Classics)
