= Hattori Hanzō (disambiguation) =

Hattori Hanzō can refer to:

== People ==
- Hattori Hanzō Yasunaga (?-?) (服部 半蔵（半三） 保長), father of Hattori Hanzō, the first Hattori Hanzō
- Hattori Hanzō Masanari I (Masashige I) (服部 半蔵 正成) (1542-1596), son of Hattori Yasunaga, the second Hattori Hanzō
- Hattori Hanzō Masanari II (服部 半蔵 正就) (1565-1615), eldest son of the second Hattori Hanzō, the third Hattori Hanzō
- Hattori Hanzō Masashige II (服部 半蔵 正重) (1580-1652), second son of the second Hattori Hanzō, the fourth Hattori Hanzō
- Hattori Masayoshi (服部 半蔵 正義) (1846-1886), the twelfth Hattori Hanzō and head of Hattori clan, retainer of Kuwana domain, Ise

== Video games ==
- Hanzo Hattori from the Samurai Shodown series of fighting games
- Hanzou Hattori (World Heroes), a character from the World Heroes and Neo Geo Battle Coliseum fighting games
- Hanzo Hasashi, the true name of the ninja specter Scorpion from Mortal Kombat
- Hanzo (Overwatch), a player character in the video games Overwatch and Heroes of the Storm
- Hanzo (Inindo: Way of The Ninja), A legendary Iga Ninja that can join your party as a companion.

== Manga ==
- The protagonist of the manga Tenka Musou
- Hanzo (Kinnikuman), a character from Ultimate Muscle

== Movies ==
- Hattori Hanzo (Kill Bill), a fictional character in Kill Bill
- Hattori Hanzo, a fictional character in The Machine Girl
- Hanzo, a fictional character in science fiction action film Predators
