= Hattori Tomosada =

Hattori Tomosada (服部 友貞) (died 1568) was a rōnin from Ise.

Initially, Tomosada served the Shiba clan. When the Shiba clan lost its power, Tomosada waged war against Oda Nobunaga. During the Battle of Okehazama, Tomosada served under the Imagawa and led a small unit. Afterwards, Tomosada recruited people from temples, shrines, and other places to beckon a larger sum of troops, even offering free officers to protect their land from Oda invasions.
