= Katsuhisa Hattori =

Japanese composer (1936–2020)

- 服部 克久
- Born: November 1, 1936; Tokyo, Japan
- Died: June 11, 2020 (aged 83); Tokyo, Japan
- Education: Conservatoire de Paris
- Occupations: Composer; arranger
- Children: Takayuki Hattori
- Parent: Ryoichi Hattori (father)
- Relatives: Ryoji Hattori (brother); Moné Hattori (granddaughter)
- Musical career
- Instruments: Piano; conductor
- Years active: 1959–2020

Katsuhisa Hattori (服部 克久, Hattori Katsuhisa; November 1, 1936 – June 11, 2020) was a Japanese classical composer who also wrote music for anime films, television series and OVAs. Hattori was a respected composer in Japan; his style was classical, although he was experienced and respected in many other genres, such as New Age, Jazz, etc. He was the son of Ryoichi Hattori and the father of Takayuki Hattori, both musical composers as well.

Besides being a composer, he was a producer and music supervisor for many years and had his own publishing company, Hattori Music Publishing. He was also a pianist, judge and chairman for the Tokyo music festivals.

== Biography ==
Hattori was born in Tokyo, Japan. In 2000, his life and musical works were honored in an hour-long Japanese television special. He has conducted many famous orchestras, but most of his own compositions are performed by the acclaimed Tokyo Pops Orchestra.

In 1989, Katsuhisa Hattori and his son, Takayuki Hattori, who is also a composer, produced the first orchestrated Final Fantasy music CD for critically acclaimed video game music composer Nobuo Uematsu. The CD was performed by the Tokyo Symphony Orchestra and entitled "Symphonic Suite Final Fantasy". In 1991, again at Nobuo Uematsu's request, he produced three Final Fantasy tracks for the first "Orchestral Game Concert" CD (tracks 13, 14 and 15) and two for the second Orchestral Game Concert.

In September 2002, the Tokyo High Court ordered Hattori to pay 9.4 million yen in damages, ruling that there was a strong similarity between his song, "Kinenju" (記念樹; "Memorial Tree"), and Asei Kobayashi's song "Dokomademo Iko" (どこまでも行こう; "Let's Go To Eternity Together"). Asei Kobayashi's music publisher, the Kanai Ongaku Shuppan company, who gave JASRAC (Japanese Society for Rights of Authors, Composers and Publishers) permission to manage the song "Dokomademo Iko" in 1967, claimed that JASRAC had illegally allowed the use of the sound-alike song. In December 2003, the Tokyo District Court ordered JASRAC to pay 1.8 million yen in damages, for allowing the publishing, broadcast and sale in CD form of Hattori's song. This decision was overturned by the Tokyo High Court in 2005.

Hattori died on June 11, 2020, at the age of 83. He became one of eight recipients of the Special Lifetime Achievement Award at the 62nd Japan Record Awards.

== Discography ==
- Champs de la Musique (1983)
- JUICY and CRISPY (1985)
- Bon Voyage (1986)
- À la Carté (1987)
- QUATLE SAISON (1988)
- Le Monde (1989)
- Arc en Ciel (1990)
- Sports (1992)
- Nature (1994)
- Almanach (1995)
- Congratulation (1996)
- Lutus Dream (1997)
- Mon Reve (1998)
- La Strada (1998)
- The Earth (1998)
- Friends (1999)
- Dissolve (2000)
- À la Table (2001)
- Invitation (2002)
- Comme d'Habitude (2003)
- Author's Best Vol.1 (2004)
- Author's Best Vol.2 (2005)

== Film soundtracks ==
- Yusei Oji (Planet Prince) (1959)
- Konya wa Odoro (1967)
- Rio no Wakadaishô (1968)
- Nanatsu no Kao no Onna (1969)
- Naikai no wa (1971)
- Aitsu to Watashi (1976)
- Hakatakko Junjô (1978)

== Anime soundtracks ==
- Adventures of Tom Sawyer (1980)
- Swiss Family Robinson (1981)
- Wanwan Sanjushi (songs by Guido & Maurizio De Angelis) (1981)
- Hokuto no Ken (1986)
- Ie Naki Ko Remi (1996)
- In The Beginning - The Bible Stories (1997)
- Infinite Ryvius (1999)
- Seikai no Monshō ("Crest of the Stars") (1999)
- Seikai no Danshou ("Lost Chapter of the Stars - Birth") (2000)
- Seikai no Senki ("Banner of the Stars") (2000)
- Argento Soma (2000)
- Seikai no Senki II ("Banner of the Stars II") (2001)
- Seikai no Senki III ("Banner of the Stars III") (2005)
