= Yoshio Hattori =

Japanese businessman

- 服部 敬雄
- Born: December 10, 1899; Yamagata Prefecture, Japan
- Died: March 14, 1991 (aged 91)
- Occupation: Businessman
- Awards: Golden Pheasant Award

Yoshio Hattori (服部 敬雄, Hattori Yoshio, December 10, 1899 Yamagata Prefecture - March 14, 1991) was a Japanese businessman.

== Background ==
In 1990 he posthumously received the highest distinction of the Scout Association of Japan, the Golden Pheasant Award.
