= Fuyuki Yamakawa =

Japanese performance artist

- Born: Yamakawa Fuyuki; 1973 (age 52–53); London, UK
- Education: Tama Art University
- Notable work: sound art, performance art
- Style: experimental, body art
- Awards: Yokohama Cultural Award, 2015

Fuyuki Yamakawa (山川冬樹) (born 1973) is a performance artist, sound artist and musician who lives in Yokohama and Tokyo, Japan.

== Early life and education ==
Yamakawa was born in London where his father was an anchor and correspondent for Fuji Television. At three years of age, his family relocated to Yokohama, Japan before moving to the United States where Yamakawa attended middle school. He became interested in sound through a fascination with his father's cassette recordings of soundscapes from his travels to the Middle East as a news correspondent. As a teenager, Yamakawa experimented with field recordings of bird sounds using a microphone and a paper PYArabolic antenna. When he was in middle school, Yamakawa's father died of throat cancer; as his condition worsened, he eventually lost his voice, the primary faculty with which his work as a news anchor was based. Yamakawa cites his father's loss of voice to his own interest in Tuvan khoomei throat singing as it is generated by vibrations deep within the body. Yamakawa first became aware of khoomei when CD's began surfacing in record stores in Japan after the collapse of the Soviet Union.

Yamakawa completed a master's degree in video art and graphic design in 1999 at the Tama Art University. While at university he played electric guitar in rock bands. He later developed an interest in club music and began creating computer drum 'n bass work.

== Performances and exhibitions ==
His work has been presented at the Centre Pompidou-Metz, La Biennale di Venezia, Arsenale, Venice, Italy among other venues. He is known for his multi-tonal Khoomei singing and musical happenings that amplify the sound of his heartbeat and other body sounds using instruments such as stethoscopes and bone-conduction devices.

Yamakawa has exhibited and performed in Japan at the Museum of Contemporary Art, Tokyo; Museum of Modern Art, Toyama, Toyama, Japan; Tokyo Metropolitan Museum of Photography, Tokyo; Goethe-Institut Tokyo Hall, Tokyo, Japan; Kyoto Art Center, Kyoto, Japan; Laforet Museum, Tokyo; Watari Museum of Contemporary Art, Tokyo, Japan. In Singapore his work has been presented at the NUS Museum, National University of Singapore, and at the Theater Studio, Esplanade. In South Korea he has presented his work at the Nam June Paik Art Center; Busan Museum of Art and the Busan Bienniale, Additionally his work has been presented at The Kitchen, New York; Paddington Town Hall, Sydney, Australia; Centre de Cultura Contemporània de Barcelona, Spain, among other venues.

He has taught at the Tama Art University and at the Tokyo University of the Arts.

== Selected works ==
=== D.D.D. ===
Yamakawa believes that the "human heart is controlled by breathing, an in-between process of controllable and uncontrollable." Using Tuvan throat-singing techniques, Yamakawa manipulates sound by integrating throat and lung produced utterances with a learned control of his heart beat. His performance D.D.D. addresses life expectancy in relation to the numbers of times a person's heart beats during their lifetime. The performance included charts, data on Japanese life-expectation, and internal scans of the human body to visualize heartbeats into years, minutes and seconds.

=== Atomic Guitars ===
Yamakawa is also known for his installation work, Atomic Guitars (2012), in response to the Fukushima nuclear disaster, after which his work took on aspects of social criticism. Atomic Guitar, Mark I & Mark II, is an automated "guitar playing system operated by radioactivity." Nick Richardson of the London Review of Books has described the work as: "Two canary yellow stratocasters, mounted on stands to face each other and wired into squat black amps, buzz with a tentative open string drone. Next to the guitars hangs the shell of a radiation-proof suit." Each of the guitars was wired up to a geiger counter and a tactile transducer. A pot of soil collected from sites in Tokyo sits beneath each guitar on an empty stage. The soil was contaminated from the plume of air-borne radiation from the 2011 Fukushima nuclear reactor meltdowns that occurred 118 miles from Tokyo. As each geiger counter clicks from detecting radioactive isotopes that are emitted from the soil, the tactile transducers cause a vibration in the guitar strings to play a dissonant soundscape.

=== DOMBRA ===
In the winter of 2020, Yamakawa performed a major work, DOMBRA, on a grouping of boats in the Tokyo Bay. The performance combined his throat-singing with the sound of seagulls, waves and passing boats. This work produced in the early days of the COVID-19 crisis, placed the pandemic within a "historical context while demonstrating the potential to open up new avenues into tomorrow." Boats carried the audience into the bay while another boat held a sound stage on which Yamakawa and others performed. The content of the spoken word portions of the piece referred to the movement, commerce and other impacts of humans on the natural environs of Tokyo Bay.

== Awards ==
In 2015 Yamakawa received the Yokohama Cultural Award; In 2003, Yamakawa received the Avant-Garde Award from the "4th International Khoomei Festival", Republic of Tuva, Russia (sponsored by UNESCO)

== Collections ==
Yamakawa's work, The Voice Over, is in the permanent collection of the Museum of Contemporary Art, Tokyo.
