= Hattori–Stong theorem =

Theorem in algebraic topology

In algebraic topology, the Hattori–Stong theorem, proved by Robert Evert Stong (1965) and Akio Hattori (1966), gives an isomorphism between the stable homotopy of a Thom spectrum and the primitive elements of its K-homology.
