= Katsura Hattori =

Japanese editor

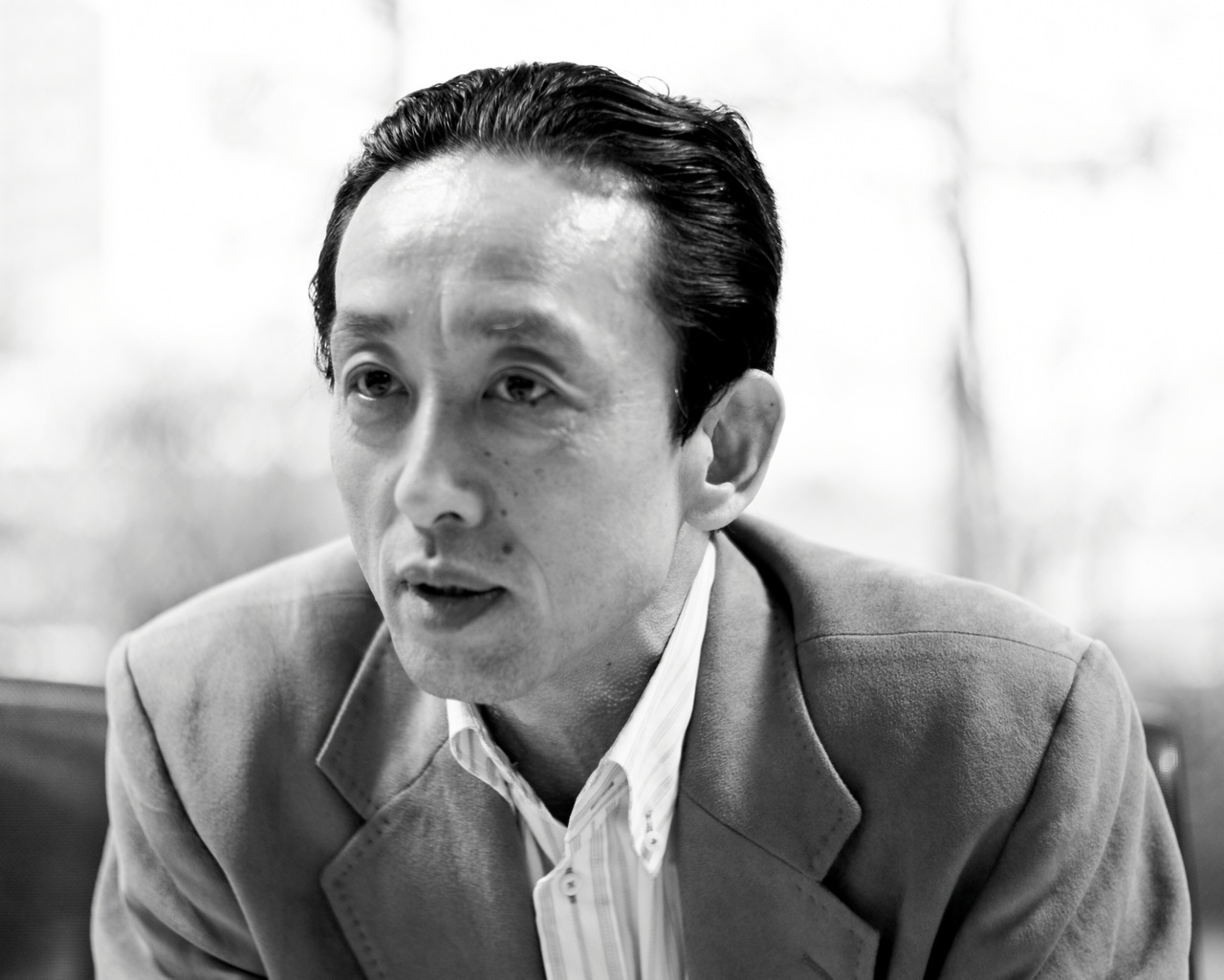
Katsura Hattori

Katsura Hattori (服部 桂; born 1951) is a Japanese editor. After studying in MIT Media Lab, he worked as editor for computer magazines ASAHI pasokon and Doors.
