= Fuyuki Hattori =

Japanese photographer (born 1955)

Fuyuki Hattori (服部 冬樹, Hattori Fuyuki; born 1955) is a Japanese photographer.
