= Yoshishige Ashihara =

Japanese businessman

- 芦原 義重
- Born: March 4, 1901
- Died: July 12, 2003 (aged 102)
- Occupation: Businessman
- Awards: Golden Pheasant Award

Yoshishige Ashihara (芦原 義重, Ashihara Yoshishige; March 4, 1901 – July 12, 2003) was a Japanese businessman in the Shōwa period, president of Kansai Electric Power Company.

In 1997 he received the highest distinction of the Scout Association of Japan, the Golden Pheasant Award.
