= Hamzehabad =

Hamzehabad (Persian: حمزه اباد) may refer to various palaces in Iran:

- Hamzehabad, Chaharmahal and Bakhtiari
- Hamzehabad, Kermanshah
- Hamzehabad, Mazandaran
- Hamzehabad, Sistan and Baluchestan
- Hamzehabad, Tehran
- Hamzehabad, Bukan, West Azerbaijan Province
- Hamzehabad, Mahabad, West Azerbaijan Province
- Hamzehabad-e Olya, West Azerbaijan Province
- Hamzehabad-e Sofla, West Azerbaijan Province
- Hamzehabad, Zanjan
