= Silveh =

Village in West Azerbaijan province, Iran

Silveh Persian: سيلوه
- Village
- Location within Iran
- Coordinates: 36°48′04″N 45°06′03″E
- Country: Iran
- Province: West Azerbaijan
- County: Piranshahr
- District: Lajan
- Rural District: Lahijan-e Gharbi

Population (2016)
  - Total: 286
- Time zone: UTC+3:30 (IRST)

Silveh (Persian: سيلوه) (Note: Also romanized as Sīlveh) is a village in, and the capital of, Lahijan-e Gharbi Rural District in Lajan District of Piranshahr County, West Azerbaijan province, Iran. The previous capital of the rural district was the village of Darbekeh, now in Lahijan Rural District. The village can be flooded when the Silveh Dam reaches full capacity.

== Demographics ==
=== Population ===
At the time of the 2006 National Census, the village's population was 919 in 168 households. The following census in 2011 counted 963 people in 232 households. The 2016 census measured the population of the village as 286 people in 80 households.
