= Kani Bodagh =

Kani Bodagh كاني بداغ
- Village
- Location within Iran
- Coordinates: 36°49′09″N 45°24′51″E
- Country: Iran
- Province: West Azerbaijan
- County: Piranshahr
- Bakhsh: Lajan
- Rural District: Lahijan-e Sharqi

Population (2006)
  - Total: 260
- Time zone: UTC+3:30 (IRST)
  - Summer (DST): UTC+4:30 (IRDT)

Kani Bodagh (Persian: كاني بداغ, also Romanized as Kānī Bodāgh) is a village in Lahijan-e Sharqi Rural District, Lajan District, Piranshahr County, West Azerbaijan Province, Iran. At the 2006 census, its population was 260, in 48 families.
