= Kani Kisalan =

Kani Kisalan كاني كيسلان
- Village
- Location within Iran
- Coordinates: 36°34′11″N 45°24′02″E
- Country: Iran
- Province: West Azerbaijan
- County: Piranshahr
- Bakhsh: Lajan
- Rural District: Lahijan-e Sharqi

Population (2006)
  - Total: 35
- Time zone: UTC+3:30 (IRST)
  - Summer (DST): UTC+4:30 (IRDT)

Kani Kisalan (Persian: كاني كيسلان, also Romanized as Kānī Kīsalān) is a village in Lahijan-e Sharqi Rural District, Lajan District, Piranshahr County, West Azerbaijan Province, Iran. At the 2006 census, its population was 35, in 4 families.
