= Zinuay Jian =

Zinuay Jian زينوايجان
- Village
- Location within Iran
- Coordinates: 36°42′29″N 45°17′17″E
- Country: Iran
- Province: West Azerbaijan
- County: Piranshahr
- Bakhsh: Central
- Rural District: Lahijan

Population (2006)
  - Total: 194
- Time zone: UTC+3:30 (IRST)
  - Summer (DST): UTC+4:30 (IRDT)

Zinuay Jian (Persian: زينوايجان, also Romanized as Zīnūāy Jān; also known as Zīnūn Jīān) is a village in Lahijan Rural District, in the Central District of Piranshahr County, West Azerbaijan Province, Iran. At the 2006 census, its population was 194, in 34 families.
