= Khareh Bardashan =

Khareh Bardashan خره بردشان
- Village
- Location within Iran
- Coordinates: 36°42′54″N 45°14′27″E
- Country: Iran
- Province: West Azerbaijan
- County: Piranshahr
- Bakhsh: Central
- Rural District: Lahijan

Population (2006)
  - Total: 71
- Time zone: UTC+3:30 (IRST)
  - Summer (DST): UTC+4:30 (IRDT)

Khareh Bardashan (Persian: خره بردشان, also Romanized as Khareh Bardashān) is a village in Lahijan Rural District, in the Central District of Piranshahr County, West Azerbaijan Province, Iran. At the 2006 census, its population was 71, in 10 families.
