= Bardeh Qel =

Bardeh Qel برده قل
- Village
- Location within Iran
- Coordinates: 36°45′31″N 45°12′03″E
- Country: Iran
- Province: West Azerbaijan
- County: Piranshahr
- Bakhsh: Central
- Rural District: Lahijan

Population (2006)
  - Total: 244
- Time zone: UTC+3:30 (IRST)
  - Summer (DST): UTC+4:30 (IRDT)

Bardeh Qel (Persian: برده قل, also Romanized as Bardeh Qal; also known as Bardakal, Bardeh Gol, Bardeh Qīl, and Bardqol) is a village located in Lahijan Rural District, within the Central District of Piranshahr County, West Azerbaijan Province, Iran. According the 2006 census, the village had a population was 244, living in 29 families.
