= Gerd Naleyn =

Gerd Naleyn گردنعلين
- Village
- Location within Iran
- Coordinates: 36°31′21″N 45°22′12″E
- Country: Iran
- Province: West Azerbaijan
- County: Piranshahr
- Bakhsh: Central
- Rural District: Mangur-e Gharbi

Population (2006)
  - Total: 149
- Time zone: UTC+3:30 (IRST)
  - Summer (DST): UTC+4:30 (IRDT)

Gerd Naleyn (Persian: گردنعلين, also Romanized as Gerd Na‘leyn) is a village in Mangur-e Gharbi Rural District, in the Central District of Piranshahr County, West Azerbaijan Province, Iran. At the 2006 census, its population was 149, in 19 families.
