= Dayeh Sheykhi =

Dayeh Sheykhi دايه شيخي
- Village
- Location within Iran
- Coordinates: 36°40′53″N 45°18′04″E
- Country: Iran
- Province: West Azerbaijan
- County: Piranshahr
- Bakhsh: Lajan
- Rural District: Lahijan-e Sharqi

Population (2006)
  - Total: 62
- Time zone: UTC+3:30 (IRST)
  - Summer (DST): UTC+4:30 (IRDT)

Dayeh Sheykhi (Persian: دايه شيخي, also Romanized as Dāyeh Sheykhī) is a village in Lahijan-e Sharqi Rural District, Lajan District, Piranshahr County, West Azerbaijan Province, Iran. At the 2006 census, its population reached 62 members, across 9 families.
