= Gardeshinan =

Gardeshinan گردشينان
- Village
- Location within Iran
- Coordinates: 36°32′25″N 45°20′46″E
- Country: Iran
- Province: West Azerbaijan
- County: Piranshahr
- Bakhsh: Central
- Rural District: Mangur-e Gharbi

Population (2006)
  - Total: 150
- Time zone: UTC+3:30 (IRST)
  - Summer (DST): UTC+4:30 (IRDT)

Gardeshinan (Persian: گردشينان, also Romanized as Gardeshīnān) is a village in Mangur-e Gharbi Rural District, in the Central District of Piranshahr County, West Azerbaijan Province, Iran. At the 2006 census, its population was 150, in 20 families.
