= Kani Bagh =

Kani Bagh كاني باغ
- Village
- Location within Iran
- Coordinates: 36°45′01″N 45°26′15″E
- Country: Iran
- Province: West Azerbaijan
- County: Piranshahr
- Bakhsh: Lajan
- Rural District: Lahijan-e Sharqi

Population (2006)
  - Total: 312
- Time zone: UTC+3:30 (IRST)
  - Summer (DST): UTC+4:30 (IRDT)

Kani Bagh (Persian: كاني باغ, also Romanized as Kānī Bāgh) is a village in Lahijan-e Sharqi Rural District, Lajan District, Piranshahr County, West Azerbaijan Province, Iran. At the 2006 census, its population was 312, in 53 families.
