= Qobad Beygi =

Qobad Beygi قبادبيگي
- Village
- Location within Iran
- Coordinates: 36°31′12″N 45°17′02″E
- Country: Iran
- Province: West Azerbaijan
- County: Piranshahr
- Bakhsh: Central
- Rural District: Mangur-e Gharbi

Population (2006)
  - Total: 226
- Time zone: UTC+3:30 (IRST)
  - Summer (DST): UTC+4:30 (IRDT)

Qobad Beygi (Persian: قبادبيگي, romanized as Qobād Beygī; also known as Ghobad Bagiyan, Khubatbak, Qobād Begīān, Qobād Beygān, Qobād Beygīān, and Qobād Beykīān) is a village in Mangur-e Gharbi Rural District, in the Central District of Piranshahr County, West Azerbaijan Province, Iran. As of the 2006 census, its population was 226, in 36 families.
