= Kandeh Qulan-e Sofla =

Kandeh Qulan-e Sofla كنده قولان سفلي
- Village
- Location within Iran
- Coordinates: 36°43′21″N 45°13′34″E
- Country: Iran
- Province: West Azerbaijan
- County: Piranshahr
- Bakhsh: Central
- Rural District: Lahijan

Population (2006)
  - Total: 55
- Time zone: UTC+3:30 (IRST)
  - Summer (DST): UTC+4:30 (IRDT)

Kandeh Qulan-e Sofla (Persian: كنده قولان سفلي, also Romanized as Kandeh Qūlān-e Soflá; also known as Kandeh Qūlān-e Pā'īn) is a village in Lahijan Rural District, in the Central District of Piranshahr County, West Azerbaijan Province, Iran. At the 2006 census, its population was 55, in 9 families.
