= Duli Guzan =

Duli Guzan دولي گوزان
- Village
- Location within Iran
- Coordinates: 36°34′25″N 45°20′05″E
- Country: Iran
- Province: West Azerbaijan
- County: Piranshahr
- Bakhsh: Lajan
- Rural District: Lahijan-e Sharqi

Population (2006)
  - Total: 80
- Time zone: UTC+3:30 (IRST)
  - Summer (DST): UTC+4:30 (IRDT)

Duli Guzan (Persian: دولي گوزان, also Romanized as Dūlī Gūzān; also known as Dūlgūzān) is a village in Lahijan-e Sharqi Rural District, Lajan District, Piranshahr County, West Azerbaijan Province, Iran. At the 2006 census, its population was 80, in 13 families.
