= Duchuman =

Duchuman دوچومان
- Village
- Location within Iran
- Coordinates: 36°30′47″N 45°17′25″E
- Country: Iran
- Province: West Azerbaijan
- County: Piranshahr
- Bakhsh: Central
- Rural District: Mangur-e Gharbi

Population (2006)
  - Total: 78
- Time zone: UTC+3:30 (IRST)
  - Summer (DST): UTC+4:30 (IRDT)

Duchuman (Persian: دوچومان, also Romanized as Dūchūmān; also known as Dūchmān) is a village in Mangur-e Gharbi Rural District, in the Central District of Piranshahr County, West Azerbaijan Province, Iran. At the 2006 census, its population was 78, in 9 families.
