= Havarabid =

Havarabid هوارابيد
- Village
- Location within Iran
- Coordinates: 36°47′02″N 45°11′34″E
- Country: Iran
- Province: West Azerbaijan
- County: Piranshahr
- Bakhsh: Lajan
- Rural District: Lahijan-e Gharbi

Population (2006)
  - Total: 158
- Time zone: UTC+3:30 (IRST)
  - Summer (DST): UTC+4:30 (IRDT)

Havarabid (Persian: هوارابيد, also Romanized as Havārābīd; also known as Havārbī) is a village in Lahijan-e Gharbi Rural District, Lajan District, Piranshahr County, West Azerbaijan Province, Iran. At the 2006 census, its population was 158, in 30 families.
