= Gerd Morad Beg =

Gerd Morad Beg گردمرادبگ
- Village
- Location within Iran
- Coordinates: 36°33′45″N 45°24′37″E
- Country: Iran
- Province: West Azerbaijan
- County: Piranshahr
- Bakhsh: Lajan
- Rural District: Lahijan-e Sharqi

Population (2006)
  - Total: 70
- Time zone: UTC+3:30 (IRST)
  - Summer (DST): UTC+4:30 (IRDT)

Gerd Morad Beg (Persian: گردمرادبگ, also Romanized as Gerd Morād Beg; also known as Gerd Morad Beyg) is a village in Lahijan-e Sharqi Rural District, Lajan District, Piranshahr County, West Azerbaijan Province, Iran. At the 2006 census, its population was 70, in 10 families.
