= Sarv Kani =

Sarv Kani سروكاني
- Village
- Location within Iran
- Coordinates: 36°49′09″N 45°14′01″E
- Country: Iran
- Province: West Azerbaijan
- County: Piranshahr
- Bakhsh: Lajan
- Rural District: Lahijan-e Sharqi

Population (2006)
  - Total: 1,250
- Time zone: UTC+3:30 (IRST)
  - Summer (DST): UTC+4:30 (IRDT)

Sarv Kani (Persian: سروكاني, also Romanized as Sarv Kānī, Sarūkānī, and Seroukani) is a village in Lahijan-e Sharqi Rural District, Lajan District, Piranshahr County, West Azerbaijan Province, Iran. At the 2006 census, its population was 1,250, in 208 families.
