= Yaqush =

Yaqush ياقوش
- Village
- Location within Iran
- Coordinates: 36°32′30″N 45°26′24″E
- Country: Iran
- Province: West Azerbaijan
- County: Piranshahr
- Bakhsh: Lajan
- Rural District: Lahijan-e Sharqi

Population (2006)
  - Total: 37
- Time zone: UTC+3:30 (IRST)
  - Summer (DST): UTC+4:30 (IRDT)

Yaqush (Persian: ياقوش, also Romanized as Yāqūsh) is a village in Lahijan-e Sharqi Rural District, Lajan District, Piranshahr County, West Azerbaijan Province, Iran. At the 2006 census, its population was 37, in 6 families.
