= Gerd Ashvan =

Gerd Ashvan گرداشوان
- Village
- Location within Iran
- Coordinates: 36°39′57″N 45°13′28″E
- Country: Iran
- Province: West Azerbaijan
- County: Piranshahr
- Bakhsh: Central
- Rural District: Lahijan

Population (2006)
  - Total: 170
- Time zone: UTC+3:30 (IRST)
  - Summer (DST): UTC+4:30 (IRDT)

Gerd Ashvan (Persian: گرداشوان, also Romanized as Gerd Āshvān) is a village in Lahijan Rural District, in the Central District of Piranshahr County, West Azerbaijan Province, Iran. At the 2006 census, its population was 170, in 26 families.
