= Gerd Kavlan =

Gerd Kavlan گرد كولان
- Village
- Location within Iran
- Coordinates: 36°48′51″N 45°04′02″E
- Country: Iran
- Province: West Azerbaijan
- County: Piranshahr
- Bakhsh: Lajan
- Rural District: Lahijan-e Gharbi

Population (2006)
  - Total: 207
- Time zone: UTC+3:30 (IRST)
  - Summer (DST): UTC+4:30 (IRDT)

Gerd Kavlan (Persian: گرد كولان, also Romanized as Gerd Kāvlān) is a village in Lahijan-e Gharbi Rural District, Lajan District, Piranshahr County, West Azerbaijan Province, Iran. At the 2006 census, its population was 207, in 31 families.
