= Shahrak-e Shahid Rezavani-ye Lakben =

Shahrak-e Shahid Rezavani-ye Lakben شهرك شهيدرضواني لك بن
- Village
- Country: Iran
- Province: West Azerbaijan
- County: Piranshahr
- Bakhsh: Lajan
- Rural District: Lahijan-e Sharqi

Population (2006)
  - Total: 55
- Time zone: UTC+3:30 (IRST)
  - Summer (DST): UTC+4:30 (IRDT)

Shahrak-e Shahid Rezavani-ye Lakben (Persian: شهرك شهيدرضواني لك بن, also Romanized as Shahrak-e Shahīd Rez̤avānī-ye Lakben) is a village in Lahijan-e Sharqi Rural District, Lajan District, Piranshahr County, West Azerbaijan Province, Iran. At the 2006 census, its population was 55, in 9 families.
