= Gerd Basak =

Gerd Basak گردباسك
- Village
- Location within Iran
- Coordinates: 36°32′52″N 45°14′39″E
- Country: Iran
- Province: West Azerbaijan
- County: Piranshahr
- Bakhsh: Central
- Rural District: Mangur-e Gharbi

Population (2006)
  - Total: 239
- Time zone: UTC+3:30 (IRST)
  - Summer (DST): UTC+4:30 (IRDT)

Gerd Basak (Persian: گردباسك, also Romanized as Gerd Bāsāk) is a village in Mangur-e Gharbi Rural District, in the Central District of Piranshahr County, West Azerbaijan Province, Iran. At the 2006 census, its population was 239, in 32 families.
