= Kani Kaleh =

Kani Kaleh كاني كله
- Village
- Location within Iran
- Coordinates: 36°32′28″N 45°26′50″E
- Country: Iran
- Province: West Azerbaijan
- County: Piranshahr
- Bakhsh: Lajan
- Rural District: Lahijan-e Sharqi

Population (2006)
  - Total: 114
- Time zone: UTC+3:30 (IRST)
  - Summer (DST): UTC+4:30 (IRDT)

Kani Kaleh (Persian: كاني كله, also Romanized as Kānī Kaleh; also known as Kānī Kīleh) is a village in Lahijan-e Sharqi Rural District, Lajan District, Piranshahr County, West Azerbaijan Province, Iran. At the 2006 census, its population was 114, in 16 families.
