= Hejran =

Village in West Azerbaijan province, Iran

Hejran Persian: حجران
- Village
- Location within Iran
- Coordinates: 36°28′25″N 45°25′40″E
- Country: Iran
- Province: West Azerbaijan
- County: Piranshahr
- District: Central
- Rural District: Mangur-e Gharbi

Population (2016)
  - Total: 285
- Time zone: UTC+3:30 (IRST)

Hejran (Persian: حجران) (Note: Also romanized as Hejrān) is a village in Mangur-e Gharbi Rural District of the Central District in Piranshahr County, West Azerbaijan province, Iran.

== Demographics ==
=== Population ===
At the time of the 2006 National Census, the village's population was 247 in 25 households. The following census in 2011 counted 262 people in 50 households. The 2016 census measured the population of the village as 285 people in 64 households.
