= Gerd Rahmat =

Village in West Azerbaijan province, Iran

Gerd Rahmat Persian: گردرحمت
- Village
- Location within Iran
- Coordinates: 36°34′10″N 45°12′26″E
- Country: Iran
- Province: West Azerbaijan
- County: Piranshahr
- District: Central
- Rural District: Mangur-e Gharbi

Population (2016)
  - Total: 270
- Time zone: UTC+3:30 (IRST)

Gerd Rahmat (Persian: گردرحمت) (Note: Also romanized as Gerd Raḩmat) is a village in Mangur-e Gharbi Rural District of the Central District in Piranshahr County, West Azerbaijan province, Iran.

== Demographics ==
=== Population ===
At the time of the 2006 National Census, the village's population was 275 in 36 households. The following census in 2011 counted 255 people in 38 households. The 2016 census measured the population of the village as 270 people in 67 households.
