= Qarah Khezer, West Azerbaijan =

Qarah Khezer قره خضر
- Village
- Location within Iran
- Coordinates: 36°38′45″N 45°16′29″E
- Country: Iran
- Province: West Azerbaijan
- County: Piranshahr
- Bakhsh: Lajan
- Rural District: Lahijan-e Sharqi

Population (2006)
  - Total: 267
- Time zone: UTC+3:30 (IRST)
  - Summer (DST): UTC+4:30 (IRDT)

Qarah Khezer (Persian: قره خضر, also Romanized as Qarah Kheẕer and Qareh Kheẕr; also known as Qarah Qhezer) is a village in Lahijan-e Sharqi Rural District, Lajan District, Piranshahr County, West Azerbaijan Province, Iran. At the 2006 census, its population was 267, in 46 families.
