= Qabar Hoseyn =

Village in West Azerbaijan province, Iran

Qabar Hoseyn Persian: قبر حسين
- Village
- Location within Iran
- Coordinates: 36°29′04″N 45°18′10″E
- Country: Iran
- Province: West Azerbaijan
- County: Piranshahr
- District: Central
- Rural District: Mangur-e Gharbi

Population (2016)
  - Total: 706
- Time zone: UTC+3:30 (IRST)

Qabar Hoseyn (Persian: قبر حسين) (Note: Also romanized as Qabar Ḩoseyn) is a village in Mangur-e Gharbi Rural District of the Central District in Piranshahr County, West Azerbaijan province, Iran.

== Demographics ==
=== Population ===
At the time of the 2006 National Census, the village's population was 572 in 98 households. The following census in 2011 counted 671 people in 165 households. The 2016 census measured the population of the village as 706 people in 145 households.
