= Tarkesh-e Sofla =

Village in West Azerbaijan province, Iran

Tarkesh-e Sofla Persian: تركش سفلي
- Village
- Location within Iran
- Coordinates: 36°31′07″N 45°15′25″E
- Country: Iran
- Province: West Azerbaijan
- County: Piranshahr
- District: Central
- Rural District: Mangur-e Gharbi

Population (2016)
  - Total: 531
- Time zone: UTC+3:30 (IRST)

Tarkesh-e Sofla (Persian: تركش سفلي) (Note: Also romanized as Tarkesh-e Soflá; also known as Tarkash, Tarkesh, and Tīrkesh-e Pā'īn) is a village in Mangur-e Gharbi Rural District of the Central District in Piranshahr County, West Azerbaijan province, Iran.

== Demographics ==
=== Population ===
At the time of the 2006 National Census, the village's population was 40 in six households. The following census in 2011 counted 523 people in 123 households. The 2016 census measured the population of the village as 531 people in 121 households.
