= Bikus =

Village in West Azerbaijan province, Iran

Bikus Persian: بيكوس
- Village
- Location within Iran
- Coordinates: 36°33′16″N 45°13′10″E
- Country: Iran
- Province: West Azerbaijan
- County: Piranshahr
- District: Central
- Rural District: Mangur-e Gharbi

Population (2016)
  - Total: 693
- Time zone: UTC+3:30 (IRST)

Bikus (Persian: بيكوس) (Note: Also romanized as Bikows and Bīkūs; also known as Bekos) is a village in Mangur-e Gharbi Rural District of the Central District in Piranshahr County, West Azerbaijan province, Iran.

== Demographics ==
=== Population ===
At the time of the 2006 National Census, the village's population was 534 in 80 households. The following census in 2011 counted 553 people in 96 households. The 2016 census measured the population of the village as 693 people in 158 households.
