= Hamzehabad-e Sofla =

Hamzehabad-e Sofla حمزه ابادسفلي
- Village
- Location within Iran
- Coordinates: 36°47′38″N 45°06′04″E
- Country: Iran
- Province: West Azerbaijan
- County: Piranshahr
- Bakhsh: Lajan
- Rural District: Lahijan-e Gharbi

Population (2006)
  - Total: 137
- Time zone: UTC+3:30 (IRST)
  - Summer (DST): UTC+4:30 (IRDT)

Hamzehabad-e Sofla (Persian: حمزه ابادسفلي, also Romanized as Ḩamzehābād-e Soflá; also known as Ḩamzehābād-e Pāīn) is a village in Lahijan-e Gharbi Rural District, Lajan District, Piranshahr County, West Azerbaijan Province, Iran. At the 2006 census, its population was 137, in 16 families.
