= Shalimjaran =

Village in West Azerbaijan province, Iran

Shalimjaran Persian: شليم جاران
- Village
- Location within Iran
- Coordinates: 36°40′27″N 45°16′33″E
- Country: Iran
- Province: West Azerbaijan
- County: Piranshahr
- District: Lajan
- Rural District: Lahijan-e Sharqi

Population (2016)
  - Total: 310
- Time zone: UTC+3:30 (IRST)

Shalimjaran (Persian: شليم جاران) (Note: Also romanized as Shalīmjārān and Shelīmjārān) is a village in Lahijan-e Sharqi Rural District of Lajan District in Piranshahr County, West Azerbaijan province, Iran.

== Demographics ==
=== Population ===
At the time of the 2006 National Census, the village's population was 300 in 50 households. The following census in 2011 counted 259 people in 54 households. The 2016 census measured the population of the village as 310 people in 69 households.
