= Ganehdar =

Ganehdar or Genehdar or Ganahdar or Ganeh Dar or Gonah Dar (Persian: گنه دار) may refer to:

- Ganehdar, Mahabad
- Ganeh Dar, Piranshahr
- Ganahdar, Lajan, Piranshahr County
