= Gerdak-e Sepian =

Village in West Azerbaijan province, Iran

Gerdak-e Sepian Persian: گردكسپيان
- Village
- Location within Iran
- Coordinates: 36°47′34″N 45°16′13″E
- Country: Iran
- Province: West Azerbaijan
- County: Piranshahr
- District: Lajan
- Rural District: Lahijan-e Sharqi

Population (2016)
  - Total: 622
- Time zone: UTC+3:30 (IRST)

Gerdak-e Sepian (Persian: گردكسپيان) (Note: Also romanized as Gerdak-e Sepīān; also known as Gerd Taspīān) is a village in Lahijan-e Sharqi Rural District of Lajan District in Piranshahr County, West Azerbaijan province, Iran.

== Demographics ==
=== Population ===
At the time of the 2006 National Census, the village's population was 640 in 100 households. The following census in 2011 counted 586 people in 137 households. The 2016 census measured the population of the village as 622 people in 148 households.
