= Owghan, West Azerbaijan =

Owghan اوغن
- Village
- Location within Iran
- Coordinates: 36°34′31″N 45°23′20″E
- Country: Iran
- Province: West Azerbaijan
- County: Piranshahr
- Bakhsh: Lajan
- Rural District: Lahijan-e Sharqi

Population (2006)
  - Total: 159
- Time zone: UTC+3:30 (IRST)
  - Summer (DST): UTC+4:30 (IRDT)

Owghan (Persian: اوغن; also known as Owghāl) is a village in Lahijan-e Sharqi Rural District, Lajan District, Piranshahr County, West Azerbaijan Province, Iran. At the 2006 census, its population was 159, in 21 families.
