= Kasehgaran, West Azerbaijan =

Kasehgaran كاسه گران
- Village
- Location within Iran
- Coordinates: 36°36′58″N 45°13′58″E
- Country: Iran
- Province: West Azerbaijan
- County: Piranshahr
- Bakhsh: Central
- Rural District: Lahijan

Population (2006)
  - Total: 306
- Time zone: UTC+3:30 (IRST)
  - Summer (DST): UTC+4:30 (IRDT)

Kasehgaran (Persian: كاسه گران, also Romanized as Kāsehgarān; also known as Kasakeran) is a village in Lahijan Rural District, in the Central District of Piranshahr County, West Azerbaijan Province, Iran. At the 2006 census, its population was 306, in 44 families.
