= Qubeh =

Village in West Azerbaijan province, Iran

Qubeh Persian: قوبه
- Village
- Location within Iran
- Coordinates: 36°48′56″N 45°09′30″E
- Country: Iran
- Province: West Azerbaijan
- County: Piranshahr
- District: Lajan
- Rural District: Lahijan-e Gharbi

Population (2016)
  - Total: 316
- Time zone: UTC+3:30 (IRST)

Qubeh (Persian: قوبه) (Note: Also romanized as Qūbeh; also known as Qabeh (قبه)) is a village in Lahijan-e Gharbi Rural District of Lajan District in Piranshahr County, West Azerbaijan province, Iran.

== Demographics ==
=== Population ===
At the time of the 2006 National Census, the village's population was 261 in 38 households. The following census in 2011 counted 221 people in 52 households. The 2016 census measured the population of the village as 316 people in 86 households.
