= Siveh Kadeh-ye Sofla =

Siveh Kadeh-ye Sofla سيوه كده سفلي
- Village
- Location within Iran
- Coordinates: 36°33′33″N 45°23′54″E
- Country: Iran
- Province: West Azerbaijan
- County: Piranshahr
- Bakhsh: Lajan
- Rural District: Lahijan-e Sharqi

Population (2006)
  - Total: 168
- Time zone: UTC+3:30 (IRST)
  - Summer (DST): UTC+4:30 (IRDT)

Siveh Kadeh-ye Sofla (Persian: سيوه كده سفلي, also Romanized as Siveh Kadeh-ye Soflá; also known as Sīb Godā-ye Pā'īn) is a village in Lahijan-e Sharqi Rural District, Lajan District, Piranshahr County, West Azerbaijan Province, Iran. At the 2006 census, its population was 168, in 22 families.
