= Gerdeh Sur =

Village in West Azerbaijan province, Iran

Gerdeh Sur Persian: گرده سور
- Village
- Location within Iran
- Coordinates: 36°50′00″N 45°05′05″E
- Country: Iran
- Province: West Azerbaijan
- County: Piranshahr
- District: Lajan
- Rural District: Lahijan-e Gharbi

Population (2016)
  - Total: 494
- Time zone: UTC+3:30 (IRST)

Gerdeh Sur (Persian: گرده سور) (Note: Also romanized as Gerdeh Sūr; also known as Gerd Sūr and Gerdesur) is a village in Lahijan-e Gharbi Rural District of Lajan District in Piranshahr County, West Azerbaijan province, Iran.

== Demographics ==
=== Population ===
At the time of the 2006 National Census, the village's population was 486 in 88 households. The following census in 2011 counted 521 people in 130 households. The 2016 census measured the population of the village as 494 people in 133 households.
