= Kapaleh Hasan =

Village in West Azerbaijan province, Iran

Kapaleh Hasan Persian: كپله حسن
- Village
- Location within Iran
- Coordinates: 36°42′08″N 45°11′21″E
- Country: Iran
- Province: West Azerbaijan
- County: Piranshahr
- District: Central
- Rural District: Lahijan

Population (2016)
  - Total: 221
- Time zone: UTC+3:30 (IRST)

Kapaleh Hasan (Persian: كپله حسن) (Note: Also romanized as Kapaleh Ḩasan; also known as Gīl Ḩasan, Kablasān, Kaplasan, and Kolbeh Ḩasan) is a village in Lahijan Rural District of the Central District in Piranshahr County, West Azerbaijan province, Iran.

== Demographics ==
=== Population ===
At the time of the 2006 National Census, the village's population was 233 in 38 households. The following census in 2011 counted 222 people in 41 households. The 2016 census measured the population of the village as 221 people in 57 households.
