= Gerdeh Bon =

Village in West Azerbaijan province, Iran

Gerdeh Bon Persian: گرده بن
- Village
- Location within Iran
- Coordinates: 36°42′02″N 45°19′38″E
- Country: Iran
- Province: West Azerbaijan
- County: Piranshahr
- District: Lajan
- Rural District: Lahijan-e Sharqi

Population (2016)
  - Total: 423
- Time zone: UTC+3:30 (IRST)

Gerdeh Bon (Persian: گرده بن) (Note: Also romanized as Gerdeh Ben; also known as Gerdeh Bīn) is a village in Lahijan-e Sharqi Rural District of Lajan District in Piranshahr County, West Azerbaijan province, Iran.

== Demographics ==
=== Population ===
At the time of the 2006 National Census, the village's population was 531 in 87 households. The following census in 2011 counted 453 people in 96 households. The 2016 census measured the population of the village as 423 people in 106 households.
