= Khoranj =

Village in West Azerbaijan province, Iran

Khoranj Persian: خرنج
- Village
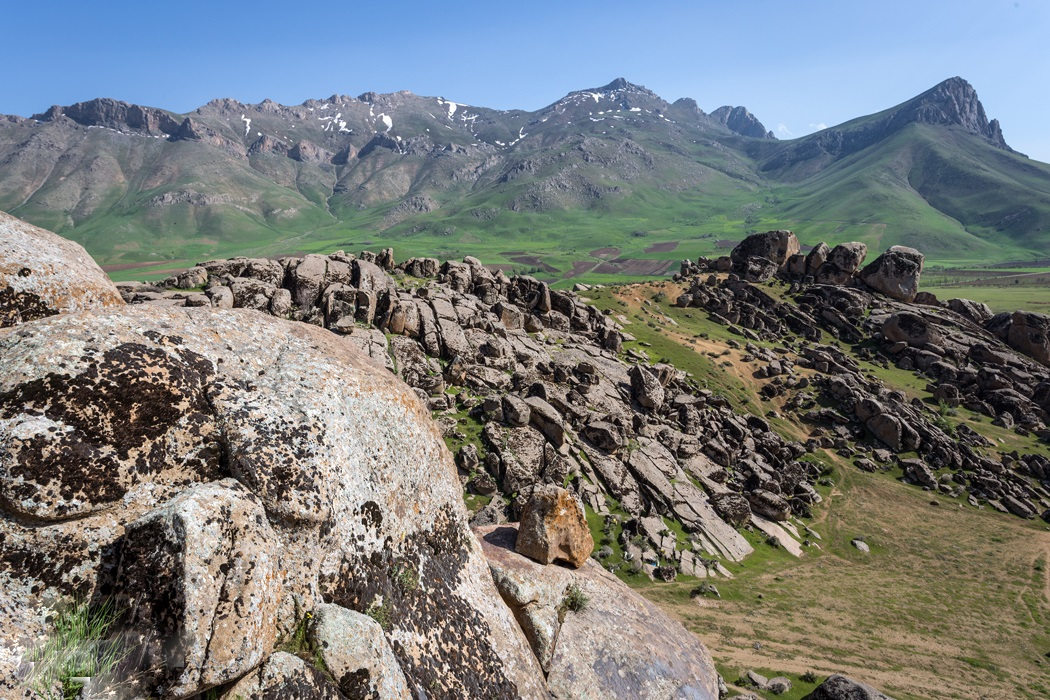
- Landscape near the village of Khoranj

- Location within Iran
- Coordinates: 36°45′00″N 45°21′38″E
- Country: Iran
- Province: West Azerbaijan
- County: Piranshahr
- District: Lajan
- Rural District: Lahijan-e Sharqi

Population (2016)
  - Total: 685
- Time zone: UTC+3:30 (IRST)

Khoranj (Persian: خرنج) (Note: Also romanized as Kherenj; also known as Khorani) is a village in Lahijan-e Sharqi Rural District of Lajan District in Piranshahr County, West Azerbaijan province, Iran.

== Demographics ==
=== Population ===
At the time of the 2006 National Census, the village's population was 640 in 116 households. The following census in 2011 counted 685 people in 167 households. The 2016 census measured the population of the village as 685 people in 170 households.
