= Berkmeran =

Village in West Azerbaijan province, Iran

Berkmeran Persian: بركمران
- Village
- Location within Iran
- Coordinates: 36°41′40″N 45°13′42″E
- Country: Iran
- Province: West Azerbaijan
- County: Piranshahr
- District: Central
- Rural District: Lahijan

Population (2016)
  - Total: 275
- Time zone: UTC+3:30 (IRST)

Berkmeran (Persian: بركمران) (Note: Also romanized as Berkmerān; also known as Bergmeran) is a village in Lahijan Rural District of the Central District in Piranshahr County, West Azerbaijan province, Iran.

== Demographics ==
=== Population ===
At the time of the 2006 National Census, the village's population was 262 in 41 households. The following census in 2011 counted 308 people in 43 households. The 2016 census measured the population of the village as 275 people in 49 households.
