= Tey 25 Pashahid Hoseyn Shahram Far =

Village in West Azerbaijan province, Iran

Tey 25 Pashahid Hoseyn Shahram Far Persian: تي 25 پشهيد حسين شهرام فر
- Village
- Country: Iran
- Province: West Azerbaijan
- County: Piranshahr
- District: Lajan
- Rural District: Lahijan-e Sharqi

Population (2016)
  - Total: 1,307
- Time zone: UTC+3:30 (IRST)

Tey 25 Pashahid Hoseyn Shahram Far (Persian: تي 25 پشهيد حسين شهرام فر) (Note: Also romanized as Tey 25 Pashahīd Ḩoseyn Shahrām Far) is a village in Lahijan-e Sharqi Rural District of Lajan District in Piranshahr County, West Azerbaijan province, Iran.

== Demographics ==
=== Population ===
At the time of the 2006 National Census, the village's population was 502 in 134 households. The following census in 2011 counted 1,450 people in 175 households. The 2016 census measured the population of the village as 1,307 people in 122 households.
