= Bastam Beg =

Village in West Azerbaijan province, Iran

Bastam Beg Persian: بسطام بگ
- Village
- Location within Iran
- Coordinates: 36°30′53″N 45°22′12″E
- Country: Iran
- Province: West Azerbaijan
- County: Piranshahr
- District: Central
- Rural District: Mangur-e Gharbi

Population (2016)
  - Total: 267
- Time zone: UTC+3:30 (IRST)

Bastam Beg (Persian: بسطام بگ) (Note: Also romanized as Basṭām Beg; also known as Basţām Beyk) is a village in Mangur-e Gharbi Rural District of the Central District in Piranshahr County, West Azerbaijan province, Iran.

== Demographics ==
=== Population ===
At the time of the 2006 National Census, the village's population was 299 in 44 households. The following census in 2011 counted 265 people in 61 households. The 2016 census measured the population of the village as 267 people in 56 households.
