= Ganeh Dar, Piranshahr =

Ganeh Dar گنه دار
- Village
- Location within Iran
- Coordinates: 36°35′53″N 45°16′36″E
- Country: Iran
- Province: West Azerbaijan
- County: Piranshahr
- Bakhsh: Central
- Rural District: Lahijan

Population (2006)
  - Total: 133
- Time zone: UTC+3:30 (IRST)
  - Summer (DST): UTC+4:30 (IRDT)

Ganeh Dar (Persian: گنه دار, also Romanized as Ganeh Dār and Gonah Dār; also known as Genehdā, Genehdar, Gonah Dār-e Mangūr, and Gonodar) is a village in Lahijan Rural District, in the Central District of Piranshahr County, West Azerbaijan Province, Iran. At the 2006 census, its population was 133, in 23 families.
