= Rigabad, Piranshahr =

Village in West Azerbaijan province, Iran

Rigabad Persian: ريگ اباد
- Village
- Location within Iran
- Coordinates: 36°38′49″N 45°13′40″E
- Country: Iran
- Province: West Azerbaijan
- County: Piranshahr
- District: Central
- Rural District: Lahijan

Population (2016)
  - Total: 503
- Time zone: UTC+3:30 (IRST)

Rigabad (Persian: ريگ اباد) (Note: Also romanized as Rīgābād; also known as Rekāvā, Rīkābād, and Rikiowa) is a village in Lahijan Rural District of the Central District in Piranshahr County, West Azerbaijan province, Iran.

== Demographics ==
=== Population ===
At the time of the 2006 National Census, the village's population was 516 in 82 households. The following census in 2011 counted 441 people in 87 households. The 2016 census measured the population of the village as 503 people in 128 households.
