= Shahrestan, West Azerbaijan =

Village in West Azerbaijan province, Iran

Shahrestan Persian: شهرستن
- Village
- Location within Iran
- Coordinates: 36°29′14″N 45°26′23″E
- Country: Iran
- Province: West Azerbaijan
- County: Piranshahr
- District: Central
- Rural District: Mangur-e Gharbi

Population (2016)
  - Total: 486
- Time zone: UTC+3:30 (IRST)

Shahrestan (Persian: شهرستن) (Note: Also romanized as Shahr Setan) is a village in Mangur-e Gharbi Rural District of the Central District in Piranshahr County, West Azerbaijan province, Iran.

== Demographics ==
=== Population ===
At the time of the 2006 National Census, the village's population was 501 in 57 households. The following census in 2011 counted 560 people in 118 households. The 2016 census measured the population of the village as 486 people in 88 households.
