= Tubozabad =

Tubozabad توبزاباد
- Village
- Location within Iran
- Coordinates: 36°45′21″N 45°18′10″E
- Country: Iran
- Province: West Azerbaijan
- County: Piranshahr
- Bakhsh: Lajan
- Rural District: Lahijan-e Sharqi

Population (2006)
  - Total: 33
- Time zone: UTC+3:30 (IRST)
  - Summer (DST): UTC+4:30 (IRDT)

Tubozabad (Persian: توبزاباد, also Romanized as Tūbozābād; also known as Toppozābād) is a village in Lahijan-e Sharqi Rural District, Lajan District, Piranshahr County, West Azerbaijan Province, Iran. At the 2006 census, its population was 33, in 6 families.
