= Ganahdar, Lajan =

Ganahdar گنه دار
- Village
- Location within Iran
- Coordinates: 36°42′37″N 45°13′45″E
- Country: Iran
- Province: West Azerbaijan
- County: Piranshahr
- Bakhsh: Lajan
- Rural District: Lahijan-e Sharqi

Population (2006)
  - Total: 194
- Time zone: UTC+3:30 (IRST)
  - Summer (DST): UTC+4:30 (IRDT)

Ganahdar (Persian: گنه دار, also Romanized as Ganahdār) is a village in Lahijan-e Sharqi Rural District, Lajan District, Piranshahr County, West Azerbaijan Province, Iran. At the 2006 census, its population was 194, in 32 families.
