= Kuper, Iran =

Village in West Azerbaijan province, Iran

Kuper Persian: كوپر
- Village
- Location within Iran
- Coordinates: 36°31′56″N 45°15′04″E
- Country: Iran
- Province: West Azerbaijan
- County: Piranshahr
- District: Central
- Rural District: Mangur-e Gharbi

Population (2016)
  - Total: 958
- Time zone: UTC+3:30 (IRST)

Kuper (Persian: كوپر) (Note: Also romanized as Kūper) is a village in, and the capital of, Mangur-e Gharbi Rural District in the Central District of Piranshahr County, West Azerbaijan province, Iran.

== Demographics ==
=== Ethnicity ===
The village is almost entirely inhabited by Kurds.

=== Population ===
At the time of the 2006 National Census, the village's population was 909 in 149 households. The following census in 2011 counted 911 people in 222 households. The 2016 census measured the population of the village as 958 people in 196 households. It was the most populous village in its rural district.
