= Silveh Dam =

- Interactive map of Silveh Dam
- Country: Iran
- Location: Lahijan-e Gharbi Rural District, Lajan District, Piranshahr County, West Azerbaijan Province, Iran
- Purpose: Inter basin transfer, Irrigation
- Status: Operational
- Construction began: 2004
- Opening date: 2015
- Owner: Regional Water Company of West Azerbaijan

Dam and spillways
- Type of dam: Embankment, earth-fill
- Impounds: Lavin River
- Height (foundation): 92 m (302 ft)
- Height (thalweg): 93 m (305 ft)
- Length: 731 m (2,398 ft)
- Spillway type: Uncontrolled, service
- Spillway capacity: 1,040 m^{3}/s (37,000 cu ft/s)

Reservoir
- Creates: Silveh Reservoir
- Total capacity: 163,000,000 m^{3} (132,000 acre⋅ft)

The Silveh Dam (Persian: سد سیلوه) is an earth-fill embankment dam on the Lavin River just downstream of the village of Silveh in Piranshahr County, West Azerbaijan Province, Iran. The primary purpose of the dam is interbasin transfer for irrigation. Since completion, a tunnel and canals shift water from the reservoir north to the Chaparabad area. The project essentially transfers water from the Little Zab River basin to the Lake Urmia basin in an effort to help replenish the lake and irrigate about 9,400 ha (23,000 acres) of farmland. Construction on the dam began in 2004 and it was expected to be complete by the end of 2015. The dam was effectively completed as of 2018. The village of Silveh will be flooded when the reservoir is impounded.

The dam is 102 m (335 ft) above its foundation with a length of 750 m (2,460 ft). It has an uncontrolled spillway with a maximum discharge capacity of 1,040 m^{3}/s (37,000 cu ft/s). The reservoir created by the dam will store 163,000,000 m^{3} (132,000 acre⋅ft) of water. Near the northeastern edge of the reservoir water will be able to enter a 841 m (2,759 ft) long tunnel which will discharge it into the opposing valley, within the Lake Urmia basin. About 121,700,000 m^{3} (98,700 acre⋅ft) of water will be transferred through the tunnel annually while an estimated 10,800,000 m^{3} (8,800 acre⋅ft) will be sent downstream to Piranshahr during the same period.

== See also ==
- Sardasht Dam – under construction downstream
- List of dams and reservoirs in Iran
- Dams in Iran
