= Kulij =

Village in West Azerbaijan province, Iran

Kulij Persian: كوليج
- Village
- Location within Iran
- Coordinates: 36°50′32″N 45°08′48″E
- Country: Iran
- Province: West Azerbaijan
- County: Piranshahr
- District: Lajan
- Rural District: Lahijan-e Gharbi

Population (2016)
  - Total: 785
- Time zone: UTC+3:30 (IRST)

Kulij (Persian: كوليج) (Note: Also romanized as Kūlīj; also known as Kolīj) is a village in Lahijan-e Gharbi Rural District of Lajan District in Piranshahr County, West Azerbaijan province, Iran.

== Demographics ==
=== Population ===
At the time of the 2006 National Census, the village's population was 684 in 113 households. The following census in 2011 counted 681 people in 152 households. The 2016 census measured the population of the village as 785 people in 179 households.
