= Baveleh-ye Sofla =

Baveleh-ye Sofla باوله سفلي
- Village
- Location within Iran
- Coordinates: 36°31′03″N 45°17′41″E
- Country: Iran
- Province: West Azerbaijan
- County: Piranshahr
- Bakhsh: Central
- Rural District: Mangur-e Gharbi

Population (2006)
  - Total: 45
- Time zone: UTC+3:30 (IRST)
  - Summer (DST): UTC+4:30 (IRDT)

Baveleh-ye Sofla (Persian: باوله سفلي, also Romanized as Bāveleh-ye Soflá; also known as Bāveleh-ye Pā'īn) is a village in Mangur-e Gharbi Rural District, in the Central District of Piranshahr County, West Azerbaijan Province, Iran. At the 2006 census, its population was 45, in 6 families.
