= Zangabad, Piranshahr =

Village in West Azerbaijan province, Iran

Zangabad Persian: زنگ اباد
- Village
- Location within Iran
- Coordinates: 36°44′35″N 45°16′08″E
- Country: Iran
- Province: West Azerbaijan
- County: Piranshahr
- District: Central
- Rural District: Lahijan

Population (2016)
  - Total: 283
- Time zone: UTC+3:30 (IRST)

Zangabad (Persian: زنگ اباد) (Note: Also romanized as Zangābād) is a village in Lahijan Rural District of the Central District in Piranshahr County, West Azerbaijan province, Iran.

== Demographics ==
=== Population ===
At the time of the 2006 National Census, the village's population was 389 in 65 households. The following census in 2011 counted 417 people in 84 households. The 2016 census measured the population of the village as 283 people in 68 households.
