= Lavin, Iran =

Village in West Azerbaijan province, Iran

Lavin Persian: لاوين
- Village
- Location within Iran
- Coordinates: 36°40′15″N 45°12′21″E
- Country: Iran
- Province: West Azerbaijan
- County: Piranshahr
- District: Central
- Rural District: Lahijan

Population (2016)
  - Total: 353
- Time zone: UTC+3:30 (IRST)

Lavin (Persian: لاوين) (Note: Also romanized as Lāvīn) is a village in Lahijan Rural District of the Central District in Piranshahr County, West Azerbaijan province, Iran.

== Demographics ==
=== Population ===
At the time of the 2006 National Census, the village's population was 522 in 65 households. The following census in 2011 counted 446 people in 73 households. The 2016 census measured the population of the village as 353 people in 81 households.
