= Hangabad =

Village in West Azerbaijan province, Iran

Hangabad Persian: هنگ اباد
- Village
- Location within Iran
- Coordinates: 36°32′35″N 45°18′06″E
- Country: Iran
- Province: West Azerbaijan
- County: Piranshahr
- District: Central
- Rural District: Mangur-e Gharbi

Population (2016)
  - Total: 743
- Time zone: UTC+3:30 (IRST)

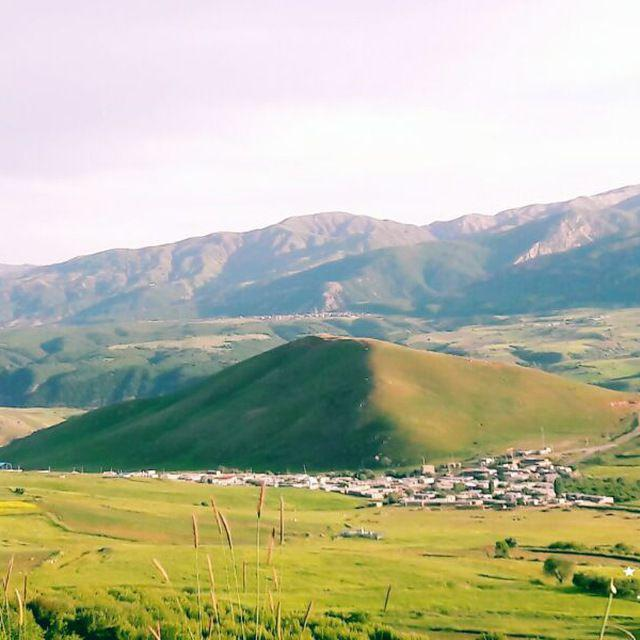
A distant view of the village of Hangabad.

Hangabad (Persian: هنگ اباد) (Note: Also romanized as Hangābād) is a village in Mangur-e Gharbi Rural District of the Central District in Piranshahr County, West Azerbaijan province, Iran.

== Demographics ==
=== Population ===
At the time of the 2006 National Census, the village's population was 807 in 140 households. The following census in 2011 counted 803 people in 172 households. The 2016 census measured the population of the village as 743 people in 165 households.
