= Kileh-ye Olya =

Village in West Azerbaijan province, Iran

Kileh-ye Olya Persian: كيله عليا
- Village
- Location within Iran
- Coordinates: 36°47′23″N 45°14′16″E
- Country: Iran
- Province: West Azerbaijan
- County: Piranshahr
- District: Lajan
- Rural District: Lahijan-e Sharqi

Population (2016)
  - Total: 323
- Time zone: UTC+3:30 (IRST)

Kileh-ye Olya (Persian: كيله عليا) (Note: Also romanized as Kīleh-ye ‘Olyā; also known as Gīleh-ye ‘Olyā, Kileh, and Kīleh-ye Bālā) is a village in Lahijan-e Sharqi Rural District of Lajan District in Piranshahr County, West Azerbaijan province, Iran.

== Demographics ==
=== Population ===
At the time of the 2006 National Census, the village's population was 279 in 55 households. The following census in 2011 counted 300 people in 71 households. The 2016 census measured the population of the village as 323 people in 85 households.
