= Gargul-e Olya =

Gargul-e Olya گرگول عليا
- Village
- Location within Iran
- Coordinates: 36°46′43″N 45°29′40″E
- Country: Iran
- Province: West Azerbaijan
- County: Piranshahr
- Bakhsh: Lajan
- Rural District: Lahijan-e Sharqi

Population (2006)
  - Total: 228
- Time zone: UTC+3:30 (IRST)
  - Summer (DST): UTC+4:30 (IRDT)

Gargul-e Olya (Persian: گرگول عليا, also Romanized as Gargūl-e ‘Olyā; also known as Gargūl-e Bālā) is a village in Lahijan-e Sharqi Rural District, Lajan District, Piranshahr County, West Azerbaijan Province, Iran. At the 2006 census, its population was 228, in 38 families.
