= Kharapa =

Village in West Azerbaijan province, Iran

Kharapa Persian: خراپا
- Village
- Location within Iran
- Coordinates: 36°42′23″N 45°15′51″E
- Country: Iran
- Province: West Azerbaijan
- County: Piranshahr
- District: Central
- Rural District: Lahijan

Population (2016)
  - Total: 206
- Time zone: UTC+3:30 (IRST)

Kharapa (Persian: خراپا) (Note: Also romanized as Kharāpā; also known as Kharabeh and Kharābeh) is a village in Lahijan Rural District of the Central District in Piranshahr County, West Azerbaijan province, Iran.

== Demographics ==
=== Population ===
At the time of the 2006 National Census, the village's population was 271 in 42 households. The following census in 2011 counted 212 people in 35 households. The 2016 census measured the population of the village as 206 people in 42 households.
