= Kileh Sepyan =

Village in West Azerbaijan province, Iran

Kileh Sepyan Persian: كيله سيپان
- Village
- Location within Iran
- Coordinates: 36°43′25″N 45°19′40″E
- Country: Iran
- Province: West Azerbaijan
- County: Piranshahr
- District: Lajan
- Rural District: Lahijan-e Sharqi

Population (2016)
  - Total: 330
- Time zone: UTC+3:30 (IRST)

Kileh Sepyan (Persian: كيله سيپان) (Note: Also romanized as Kīleh Sepyān; also known as Keleh Sepyān) is a village in Lahijan-e Sharqi Rural District of Lajan District in Piranshahr County, West Azerbaijan province, Iran.

== Demographics ==
=== Population ===
At the time of the 2006 National Census, the village's population was 319 in 43 households. The following census in 2011 counted 276 people in 46 households. The 2016 census measured the population of the village as 330 people in 88 households.
