= Siveh Kadeh-ye Olya =

Siveh Kadeh-ye Olya سيوه كده عليا
- Village
- Location within Iran
- Coordinates: 36°33′46″N 45°24′10″E
- Country: Iran
- Province: West Azerbaijan
- County: Piranshahr
- Bakhsh: Lajan
- Rural District: Lahijan-e Sharqi

Population (2006)
  - Total: 63
- Time zone: UTC+3:30 (IRST)
  - Summer (DST): UTC+4:30 (IRDT)

Siveh Kadeh-ye Olya (Persian: سيوه كده عليا, also Romanized as Siveh Kadeh-ye ‘Olyā; also known as Sīb Godā-ye Bālā) is a village in Lahijan-e Sharqi Rural District, Lajan District, Piranshahr County, West Azerbaijan Province, Iran. At the 2006 census, its population was 63, in 9 families.
