= Khaldar =

Village in West Azerbaijan province, Iran

Khaldar Persian: خالدار
- Village
- Location within Iran
- Coordinates: 36°46′50″N 45°08′13″E
- Country: Iran
- Province: West Azerbaijan
- County: Piranshahr
- District: Lajan
- Rural District: Lahijan-e Gharbi

Population (2016)
  - Total: 309
- Time zone: UTC+3:30 (IRST)

Khaldar (Persian: خالدار) (Note: Also romanized as Khāldār; also known as Kaldar Gedik and Khāldār Gadīk) is a village in Lahijan-e Gharbi Rural District of Lajan District in Piranshahr County, West Azerbaijan province, Iran.

== Demographics ==
=== Population ===
At the time of the 2006 National Census, the village's population was 326 in 55 households. The following census in 2011 counted 312 people in 62 households. The 2016 census measured the population of the village as 309 people in 77 households.
