= Qalat, Piranshahr =

Village in West Azerbaijan province, Iran

Qalat Persian: قلات
- Village
- Location within Iran
- Coordinates: 36°30′15″N 45°24′15″E
- Country: Iran
- Province: West Azerbaijan
- County: Piranshahr
- District: Central
- Rural District: Mangur-e Gharbi

Population (2016)
  - Total: 357
- Time zone: UTC+3:30 (IRST)

Shahrestan (Persian: شهرستن) (Note: Also romanized as Shahr Setan) is a village in Mangur-e Gharbi Rural District of the Central District in Piranshahr County, West Azerbaijan province, Iran.

== Demographics ==
=== Population ===
At the time of the 2006 National Census, the village's population was 341 in 48 households. The following census in 2011 counted 360 people in 73 households. The 2016 census measured the population of the village as 357 people in 75 households.
