= Misheh Deh-e Olya =

Misheh Deh-e Olya ميشه ده عليا
- Village
- Location within Iran
- Coordinates: 36°34′00″N 45°21′23″E
- Country: Iran
- Province: West Azerbaijan
- County: Piranshahr
- Bakhsh: Lajan
- Rural District: Lahijan-e Sharqi

Population (2006)
  - Total: 79
- Time zone: UTC+3:30 (IRST)
  - Summer (DST): UTC+4:30 (IRDT)

Misheh Deh-e Olya (Persian: ميشه ده عليا, also Romanized as Mīsheh Deh-e ‘Olyā; also known as Mīsheh Deh Bālā) is a village in Lahijan-e Sharqi Rural District, Lajan District, Piranshahr County, West Azerbaijan Province, Iran. At the 2006 census, its population was 79, in 11 families.
