= Jaldian =

Village in West Azerbaijan province, Iran

Jaldian Persian: جلديان
- Village
- Location within Iran
- Coordinates: 36°51′59″N 45°08′23″E
- Country: Iran
- Province: West Azerbaijan
- County: Piranshahr
- District: Lajan
- Rural District: Lahijan-e Gharbi

Population (2016)
  - Total: 1,570
- Time zone: UTC+3:30 (IRST)

Jaldian (Persian: جلديان) (Note: Also romanized as Jaldeyān, Jaldīān, and Jaldīyān; also known as Jildīān) is a village in Lahijan-e Gharbi Rural District of Lajan District in Piranshahr County, West Azerbaijan province, Iran.

== Demographics ==
=== Population ===
At the time of the 2006 National Census, the village's population was 1,446 in 269 households. The following census in 2011 counted 1,582 people in 408 households. The 2016 census measured the population of the village as 1,570 people in 434 households. It was the most populous village in its rural district.
