= Darbekeh =

Village in West Azerbaijan province, Iran

Darbekeh Persian: دربكه
- Village
- Location within Iran
- Coordinates: 36°44′06″N 45°10′32″E
- Country: Iran
- Province: West Azerbaijan
- County: Piranshahr
- District: Central
- Rural District: Lahijan

Population (2016)
  - Total: 2,007
- Time zone: UTC+3:30 (IRST)

Darbekeh (Persian: دربكه) (Note: Also romanized as Darbakeh, Derbekeh, and Derebkeh; also known as Darībekeh, Derīkeh, and Dripka) is a village in, and the capital of, Lahijan Rural District in the Central District of Piranshahr County, West Azerbaijan province, Iran. It was the capital of Lahijan-e Gharbi Rural District until its capital was transferred to the village of Silveh.

== Demographics ==
=== Population ===
At the time of the 2006 National Census, the village's population was 1,493 in 272 households. The following census in 2011 counted 1,788 people in 433 households. The 2016 census measured the population of the village as 2,007 people in 498 households. It was the most populous village in its rural district.
