= Oshnuzang =

Village in West Azerbaijan province, Iran

Oshnuzang Persian: اشنوزنگ
- Village
- Location within Iran
- Coordinates: 36°45′50″N 45°14′13″E
- Country: Iran
- Province: West Azerbaijan
- County: Piranshahr
- District: Central
- Rural District: Lahijan

Population (2016)
  - Total: 567
- Time zone: UTC+3:30 (IRST)

Oshnuzang (Persian: اشنوزنگ) (Note: Also romanized as Oshnūzang and Oshnuzeng; also known as Oshnūrang and Shenow Zang) is a village in Lahijan Rural District of the Central District in Piranshahr County, West Azerbaijan province, Iran.

== Demographics ==
=== Population ===
At the time of the 2006 National Census, the village's population was 631 in 104 households. The following census in 2011 counted 591 people in 150 households. The 2016 census measured the population of the village as 567 people in 157 households.
