= Ahmad Gharib, West Azerbaijan =

Coordinates: 30°57′08″N 51°17′08″E

Ahmad Gharib احمدغريب
- Village
- Interactive map of Ahmad Gharib
- Country: Iran
- Province: West Azerbaijan
- County: Piranshahr
- Bakhsh: Lajan
- Rural District: Lahijan-e Sharqi

Population (2006)
  - Total: 88
- Time zone: UTC+3:30 (IRST)
  - Summer (DST): UTC+4:30 (IRDT)

Ahmad Gharib (Persian: احمدغريب, also Romanized as Aḩmad Gharīb) is a village in Lahijan-e Sharqi Rural District, Lajan District, Piranshahr County, West Azerbaijan Province, Iran. At the 2006 census, its population was 88, in 10 families.
