= Lakben =

Village in West Azerbaijan province, Iran

Lakben Persian: لكبن
- Village
- Location within Iran
- Coordinates: 36°44′29″N 45°25′08″E
- Country: Iran
- Province: West Azerbaijan
- County: Piranshahr
- District: Lajan
- Rural District: Lahijan-e Sharqi

Population (2016)
  - Total: 396
- Time zone: UTC+3:30 (IRST)

Lakben (Persian: لكبن) (Note: Also known as Līk Bīn and Līkbīn) is a village in Lahijan-e Sharqi Rural District of Lajan District in Piranshahr County, West Azerbaijan province, Iran.

== Demographics ==
=== Population ===
At the time of the 2006 National Census, the village's population was 405 in 63 households. The following census in 2011 counted 372 people in 80 households. The 2016 census measured the population of the village as 396 people in 87 households.
