= Pasveh =

Village in West Azerbaijan province, Iran

Pasveh Persian: پسوه
- Village
- Location within Iran
- Coordinates: 36°47′52″N 45°19′44″E
- Country: Iran
- Province: West Azerbaijan
- County: Piranshahr
- District: Lajan
- Rural District: Lahijan-e Sharqi

Population (2016)
  - Total: 3,495
- Time zone: UTC+3:30 (IRST)

Pasveh (Persian: پسوه) (Note: Also romanized as Paseveh and Pasooh; also known as Qal‘eh Paswah and Qal‘eh-ye Pasveh) is a village in, and the capital of, Lahijan-e Sharqi Rural District in Lajan District of Piranshahr County, West Azerbaijan province, Iran.

== Parsua civilization ==
Pasveh has a strategic location controlling the "easy" pass between the Lahijan district, in the Lesser Zab headwaters, and the Lake Urmia basin.

According to Vladimir Minorsky, Pasveh represents the name and location of the ancient Parsua kingdom. He explained the difference in name by saying that r-deletion in consonant clusters is well-attested. Pasveh was a frontier outpost near the Parsua's southern border (their core territory was probably the fertile Solduz district further north).

In the early 1200s, Yaqut al-Hamawi visited Pasveh and left a description in his works. A century later, Hamdallah Mustawfi included an entry for it (here spelled Basavā or Pasavā) in his Nuzhat al-Qulub. He described it as a small town in the tuman of Maragheh whose surrounding agricultural district produced grain, grapes, and some other fruits; he said its tax value was assessed at 25,000 dinars. Pasveh later features in the accounts of Kurdish tribal feuds in the Sharafnama. Much later, when Minorsky visited Pasveh in 1911, he described it as a "desolate" town with a "dilapidated" fort.

== Demographics ==
=== Population ===
At the time of the 2006 National Census, the village's population was 2,977 in 515 households. The following census in 2011 counted 3,777 people in 795 households. The 2016 census measured the population of the village as 3,495 people in 869 households. It was the most populous village in its rural district.
