= Misheh Deh-e Sofla =

Village in West Azerbaijan province, Iran

Misheh Deh-e Sofla Persian: ميشه ده سفلي
- Village
- Location within Iran
- Coordinates: 36°35′59″N 45°18′14″E
- Country: Iran
- Province: West Azerbaijan
- County: Piranshahr
- District: Lajan
- Rural District: Lahijan-e Sharqi

Population (2016)
  - Total: 326
- Time zone: UTC+3:30 (IRST)

Misheh Deh-e Sofla (Persian: ميشه ده سفلي) (Note: Also romanized as Mīsheh Deh-e Soflá; also known as Mīsheh Deh Pa'īn) is a village in Lahijan-e Sharqi Rural District of Lajan District in Piranshahr County, West Azerbaijan province, Iran.

== Demographics ==
=== Population ===
At the time of the 2006 National Census, the village's population was 398 in 54 households. The following census in 2011 counted 342 people in 57 households. The 2016 census measured the population of the village as 326 people in 60 households.
