= Misheh Deh =

Misheh Deh (Persian: ميشه ده) may refer to:

- Misheh Deh-e Olya
- Misheh Deh-e Sofla
