= Ahmad Gharib =

Ahmad Gharib (Persian: احمدغريب) may refer to:

- Ahmad Gharib, Kohgiluyeh and Boyer-Ahmad
- Ahmad Gharib, West Azerbaijan
