= Gargul =

Gargul (Persian: گرگول) may refer to:

- Gargul-e Olya
- Gargul-e Sofla
