= Siveh Kadeh =

Siveh Kadeh (Persian: سيوه كده), also known as Sib Goda, may refer to:

- Siveh Kadeh-ye Olya
- Siveh Kadeh-ye Sofla
