= Kani Ashkut, Mangur-e Gharbi =

Village in West Azerbaijan province, Iran

Kani Ashkut Persian: كاني اشكوت
- Village
- Location within Iran
- Coordinates: 36°34′07″N 45°13′09″E
- Country: Iran
- Province: West Azerbaijan
- County: Piranshahr
- District: Central
- Rural District: Mangur-e Gharbi

Population (2016)
  - Total: 254
- Time zone: UTC+3:30 (IRST)

Kani Ashkut (Persian: كاني اشكوت) (Note: Also romanized as Kani Eshkut and Kānī Eshkūt; also known as Kani Ashku, also romanized as Kānī Ashkū) is a village in Mangur-e Gharbi Rural District of the Central District in Piranshahr County, West Azerbaijan province, Iran.

== Demographics ==
=== Population ===
At the time of the 2006 National Census, the village's population was 253 in 38 households. The following census in 2011 counted 262 people in 44 households. The 2016 census measured the population of the village as 254 people in 51 households.
