= Kani Ashkut =

Kani Ashkut or Kani Eshkut (Persian: كاني اشكوت) may refer to:

- Kani Eshkut, Piranshahr
- Kani Ashkut, Lajan, Piranshahr County
