= Rezgari =

Village in West Azerbaijan province, Iran

Rezgari Persian: رزگاری
- Village
- Location within Iran
- Coordinates: 36°44′32″N 45°09′42″E
- Country: Iran
- Province: West Azerbaijan
- County: Piranshahr
- District: Lajan
- Rural District: Lahijan-e Gharbi

Population (2016)
  - Total: 1,107
- Time zone: UTC+3:30 (IRST)

Rezgari (Persian: رزگاری) (Note: Also romanized as Razgari and Rezgārī; Kurdish: رزگاری, romanized: Rizgarî) is a village in Lahijan-e Gharbi Rural District of Lajan District in Piranshahr County, West Azerbaijan province, Iran.

During the Iran-Iraq War the village was bombed by Iraqi forces in 1987.

== Demographics ==
=== Population ===
At the time of the 2006 National Census, the village's population was 912 in 181 households. The following census in 2011 counted 1,013 people in 268 households. The 2016 census measured the population of the village as 1,107 people in 289 households.
