= Kaseh Garan =

Kaseh Garan or Kaseh-ye Geran or Kasehgaran (Persian: كاسه گران) may refer to:

- Kaseh Garan, Kermanshah
- Kasehgaran, West Azerbaijan
