= Baveleh =

Baveleh (Persian: باوله) may refer to:

- Baveleh-ye Seyyedan
- Baveleh-ye Sofla
