= Hablas =

Hablas (Persian: هابلس) may refer to:

- Hablas, Piranshahr
- Hablas, Lajan, Piranshahr County
