= Shaliabad =

Shaliabad (Persian: شالي اباد) may refer to:

- Shaliabad, Kermanshah
- Shaliabad, West Azerbaijan
