= Mashkan =

Village in West Azerbaijan province, Iran

Mashkan Persian: ماشكان
- Village
- Location within Iran
- Coordinates: 36°47′56″N 45°03′41″E
- Country: Iran
- Province: West Azerbaijan
- County: Piranshahr
- District: Lajan
- Rural District: Lahijan-e Gharbi

Population (2016)
  - Total: 325
- Time zone: UTC+3:30 (IRST)

Mashkan (Persian: ماشكان) (Note: Also romanized as Māshkān and Mashkān; also known as Māshgān and Mashkiān) is a village in Lahijan-e Gharbi Rural District of Lajan District in Piranshahr County, West Azerbaijan province, Iran.

== Demographics ==
=== Population ===
At the time of the 2006 National Census, the village's population was 305 in 45 households. The following census in 2011 counted 145 people in 26 households. The 2016 census measured the population of the village as 325 people in 81 households.
