= Gargul-e Sofla =

Village in West Azerbaijan province, Iran

Gargul-e Sofla Persian: گرگول سفلي
- Village
- Location within Iran
- Coordinates: 36°47′30″N 45°27′00″E
- Country: Iran
- Province: West Azerbaijan
- County: Piranshahr
- District: Lajan
- Rural District: Lahijan-e Sharqi

Population (2016)
  - Total: 553
- Time zone: UTC+3:30 (IRST)

Gargul-e Sofla (Persian: گرگول سفلي) (Note: Also romanized as Gargūl-e Soflá; also known as Gargol, Gargūl-e Pā'īn, and Gergol) is a village in Lahijan-e Sharqi Rural District of Lajan District in Piranshahr County, West Azerbaijan province, Iran.

== Demographics ==
=== Population ===
At the time of the 2006 National Census, the village's population was 620 in 100 households. The following census in 2011 counted 552 people in 135 households. The 2016 census measured the population of the village as 553 people in 129 households.
