= Rizgari =

Rizgari (Sorani Kurdish: ڕزگاری, romanized: R̄izgarî; Persian: رزگاری, ALA-LC: Rizgārī, BGN/PCGN: Rezgārī; Arabic: رزكاري, romanized: Rizkārī) is a Kurdish word meaning salvation or liberation, and may refer to:

== Political groups ==
- Razkari Party, a Lebanese-Kurdish political party
- Rizgari Kurd, an Iraqi pan-Kurdish political party formed in 1945 by leftist students
- Sipay Rizgari, a Kurdish militant group led by Sheikh Osman Naqshbandi that partook in the Iran-Iraq War

== Settlements ==
- Rezgari, a village in Iran's West Azerbaijan province
- Rizgari, Kalar District, a village in Iraqi Kurdistan's Kalar District

== Administrative subdivisions ==
- Rizgari subdistrict, Kalar District, a subdistrict of Kalar District
- Rizgari subdistrict, Khabat District, a subdistrict of Khabat District
