= Qareh Khezer =

Qareh Khezer or Qarah Khezer or Qareh Khezr (Persian: قره خضر) may refer to:

- Qareh Khezer, East Azerbaijan
- Qarah Khezer, West Azerbaijan
