= Badinabad =

Badinabad (Persian: بادين اباد) may refer to:

- Badinabad-e Mangur
- Badinabad-e Piran
