= Owghan =

Owghan (Persian: اوغن or اوغان) may refer to:

- Owghan, East Azerbaijan (اوغان - Owghān)
- Owghan, South Khorasan
- Owghan, West Azerbaijan (اوغن - Owghan)
