= Toppozabad =

Toppozabad (Persian: تپز اباد) may refer to:

- Toppozabad, Piranshahr
- Tupuzabad, Naqadeh
