= Piranshahr =

City in West Azerbaijan province, Iran

Piranshahr Persian: پیرانشهر
- City
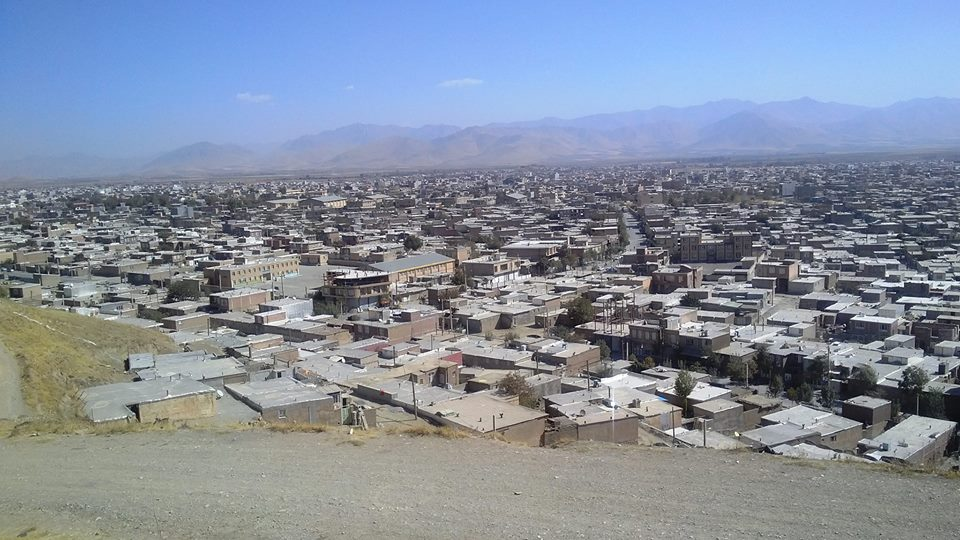

- Location within Iran
- Coordinates: 36°41′44″N 45°08′44″E
- Country: Iran
- Province: West Azerbaijan
- County: Piranshahr
- District: Central

Population (2016)
  - Total: 91,515
- Time zone: UTC+3:30 (IRST)
- Area code: +984444

Piranshahr (Persian: پيرانشهر, Kurdish: Pîranşar or Khane) (Note: Also romanized as Pīrān Shahr and Pīrānshahr; also known as Khāneh; Kurdish: پیرانشار, romanized as Pîranşar) is a city in the Central District of Piranshahr County, West Azerbaijan province, Iran, serving as capital of both the county and the district.

== Etymology ==
According to the Arab geographer Yaqut al-Hamawi, the name of the city is derived from the famous figure of Shahnameh Piran. Piran is a Turanian figure in Shahnameh, the national epic of Greater Iran. Beside Shahnameh, Piran is also mentioned in other sources such as Tabari and Tha'ālibī. He is the king of Khotan and the spahbed of Afrasiab, the king of Turan. He is described as a wise and intelligent man, seeking to bring peace to Iran and Turan.

In old Iranian writings, Piran and Aghrirat are the only Turanians that have been described positively. Piran plays a vital role in the story of Siavash, the story of Kay Khosro and the story of Bizhan and Manizhe. In Persian culture, Piran is a symbol of wisdom. It has been said that Karim Khan called Mohammad Khan Qajar "Piran". Piran is often compared to Bozorgmehr.

According to Djalal Khaleghi Motlagh, Piran may be the Median Harpagus that saved Cyrus the Great.

== Parsua civilization ==
According to Minorsky, the ancient Parsua is identical with the name of the town Pasveh in Lajan District of Piranshahr County.

Pasveh is in the vicinity of Piranshahr. Pasva is a village near Piranshahr whose name, according to the Iranist Vladimir Minorsky has existed since the 9th century BC and was built by the "Parsua tribes." It was also mentioned in the records of the Assyrian ruler Shalmaneser III (reign 858-824 BC).

== Demographics ==
=== Population ===
At the time of the 2006 National Census, the city's population was 57,692 in 12,184 households. The following census in 2011 counted 69,049 people in 16,407 households. The 2016 census measured the population of the city as 91,515 people in 23,468 households.

According to Piranshahr's organization for Civil Registration, the highest average annual growth rate in West Azerbaijan province is in Piranshahr.

== Climate ==
Piranshahr's climate is classed under the Köppen climate classification as a humid continental climate (Dsa).

Climate data for Piranshahr (1986-2005) (Note: Afternoon humidity is measured at 9:00 UTC.(12:30 IRST))
Month	Jan	Feb	Mar	Apr	May	Jun	Jul	Aug	Sep	Oct	Nov	Dec	Year
Mean daily maximum °C (°F)	2.5 (36.5)	4.2 (39.6)	9.5 (49.1)	16.5 (61.7)	22.0 (71.6)	28.1 (82.6)	32.1 (89.8)	32.4 (90.3)	28.1 (82.6)	20.9 (69.6)	12.3 (54.1)	5.9 (42.6)	17.9 (64.2)
Daily mean °C (°F)	−1.4 (29.5)	-0.0 (32.0)	5.0 (41.0)	11.1 (52.0)	15.7 (60.3)	20.5 (68.9)	24.6 (76.3)	24.5 (76.1)	20.4 (68.7)	14.6 (58.3)	7.5 (45.5)	1.9 (35.4)	12.0 (53.7)
Mean daily minimum °C (°F)	−5.3 (22.5)	−4.3 (24.3)	0.4 (32.7)	5.7 (42.3)	9.3 (48.7)	13.0 (55.4)	17.2 (63.0)	16.6 (61.9)	12.6 (54.7)	8.4 (47.1)	2.6 (36.7)	−2.1 (28.2)	6.2 (43.1)
Average precipitation mm (inches)	90.6 (3.57)	101.1 (3.98)	106.6 (4.20)	96.8 (3.81)	40.2 (1.58)	5.5 (0.22)	0.9 (0.04)	1.4 (0.06)	1.8 (0.07)	37.0 (1.46)	93.3 (3.67)	97.5 (3.84)	672.7 (26.5)
Average relative humidity (%)	71	66	62	54	49	39	36	33	34	46	62	68	52
Average afternoon relative humidity (%)	68	64	55	47	41	31	31	28	27	37	53	63	45
Average dew point °C (°F)	−6.2 (20.8)	−6.2 (20.8)	−2.2 (28.0)	2.0 (35.6)	5.1 (41.2)	6.2 (43.2)	8.6 (47.5)	7.0 (44.6)	3.6 (38.5)	2.5 (36.5)	0.1 (32.2)	−3.8 (25.2)	1.4 (34.5)
Mean monthly sunshine hours	118.2	141.9	177.2	204.7	275.5	334.8	353.2	341.0	295.4	228.2	164.7	131.6	2,766.4

== Law and government ==
The city's chief administrator is the mayor, who is elected by the municipal board of the city. According to Iranian laws the municipal board is periodically elected by the city residents.

Mayor: Safer Tefakhur

Governor: Kakderwishi

Friday prayer: Saleh Hashimabadi

Majlis representative: Kemal Hussainpur

== Education ==
The main institutions of higher education in the area are Payame Noor University and Islamic Azad University. The city is also home to a number of conservatories and art schools.
