= Lajan, Iran =

City in West Azerbaijan province, Iran

Lajan Persian: لاجان
- City
- Location within Iran
- Coordinates: 36°48′32″N 45°15′54″E
- Country: Iran
- Province: West Azerbaijan
- County: Piranshahr
- District: Lajan
- Established as a city: 2003

Population (2016)
  - Total: 4,201
- Time zone: UTC+3:30 (IRST)

Lajan (Persian: لاجان) (Note: Formerly known as Gerd Kashaneh (گردكشانه), also romanized as Gerd Kashāneh and Gerdak Shāneh; also known as Qertīq Shaneh) is a city in, and the capital of, Lajan District in Piranshahr County, West Azerbaijan province, Iran. Originally the village of Gerd Kashaneh in Lahijan-e Sharqi Rural District, it was converted to a city in 2003. In 2019, the city was renamed Lajan.

== Demographics ==
=== Population ===
At the time of the 2006 National Census, the city's population was 1,316 in 260 households. The following census in 2011 counted 1,673 people in 352 households. The 2016 census measured the population of the city as 4,201 people in 1,073 households.
