= Mashkan (disambiguation) =

Mashkan is a village in West Azerbaijan Province, Iran.

Mashkan may also refer to:

- Mashkan-shapir, Iraq
- Maskan, Iran
- Meshkat, Iran
