= Sardasht Dam =

Dam in West Azerbaijan, Iran

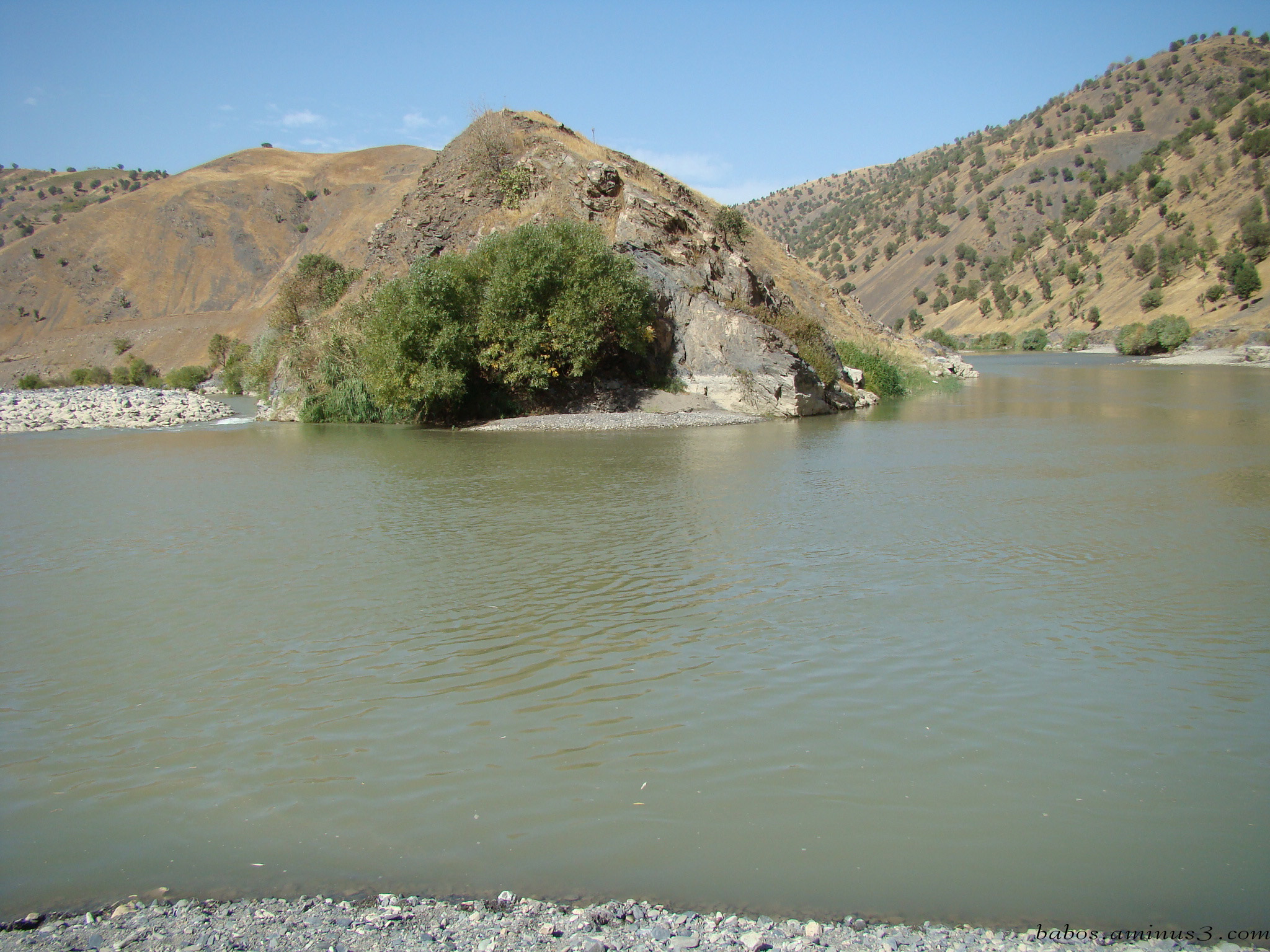

- Location within Iran
- Interactive map of Sardasht Dam
- Country: Iran
- Location: Sardasht, Sardasht County, West Azerbaijan
- Coordinates: 36°04′51.8″N 45°33′59.1″E
- Status: operational
- Construction began: 2011
- Opening date: 2018
- Owners: Iran Water and Power Resources Development Company

Dam and spillways
- Type of dam: Embankment, rock-fill earth core
- Impounds: Little Zab
- Height: 116 m (381 ft)
- Length: 275 m (902 ft)

Reservoir
- Total capacity: 545,000,000 m^{3} (441,839 acre⋅ft)

Power Station
- Installed capacity: 150 MW
- Annual generation: 482 GWh

The Sardasht Dam (Persian: سد سردشت) is an embankment dam on the Little Zab 13 km (8 mi) southeast of Sardasht in the Iranian province of West Azerbaijan. Reconnaissance studies for the dam were completed in 1999 by Moshanir Consulting Engineers Company. It is a 116 m (381 ft) tall and 275 m (902 ft) long rock-fill earth core dam. It has a hydroelectric power station with an installed capacity of 150 MW and expected annual generation of 482 GWh. The construction contract for the dam was awarded in 2009. Official construction on the dam began in 2011. The river diversion tunnels were complete in November 2012 in a ceremony attended by Iran's Ministry of Energy Majid Namjoo. The dam began to impound its reservoir on 22 June 2017.

== See also ==
- Silveh Dam
- List of dams and reservoirs in Iran
- Dams in Iran
