= Hamzehabad, Kermanshah =

Hamzehabad حمزه اباد
- Village
- Location within Iran
- Coordinates: 34°29′14″N 47°55′08″E
- Country: Iran
- Province: Kermanshah
- County: Kangavar
- Bakhsh: Central
- Rural District: Kermajan

Population (2006)
  - Total: 138
- Time zone: UTC+3:30 (IRST)
  - Summer (DST): UTC+4:30 (IRDT)

Hamzehabad (Persian: حمزه اباد, also Romanized as Ḩamzehābād) is a village in Kermajan Rural District, in the Central District of Kangavar County, Kermanshah Province, Iran. At the 2006 census, its population was 138, in 36 families.
