= Hamzehabad, Bukan =

Hamzehabad حمزه اباد
- Village
- Location within Iran
- Coordinates: 36°27′06″N 45°55′07″E
- Country: Iran
- Province: West Azerbaijan
- County: Bukan
- Bakhsh: Central
- Rural District: Il Teymur

Population (2006)
  - Total: 120
- Time zone: UTC+3:30 (IRST)
  - Summer (DST): UTC+4:30 (IRDT)

Hamzehabad (Persian: حمزه اباد, also Romanized as Ḩamzehābād) is a village in Il Teymur Rural District, in the Central District of Bukan County, West Azerbaijan Province, Iran. At the 2006 census, its population was 120, in 23 families.
