= Shaliabad, Kermanshah =

Shaliabad شالي اباد
- Village
- Location within Iran
- Coordinates: 34°36′17″N 46°42′06″E
- Country: Iran
- Province: Kermanshah
- County: Ravansar
- Bakhsh: Central
- Rural District: Hasanabad

Population (2006)
  - Total: 63
- Time zone: UTC+3:30 (IRST)
  - Summer (DST): UTC+4:30 (IRDT)

Shaliabad (Persian: شالي اباد, also Romanized as Shālīābād) is a village in Hasanabad Rural District, in the Central District of Ravansar County, Kermanshah Province, Iran. At the 2006 census, its population was 63, in 16 families.
