= Hamzehabad, Chaharmahal and Bakhtiari =

Hamzehabad حمزه اباد
- Village
- Location within Iran
- Coordinates: 32°24′14″N 50°20′20″E
- Country: Iran
- Province: Chaharmahal and Bakhtiari
- County: Kuhrang
- Bakhsh: Central
- Rural District: Dasht-e Zarrin

Population (2006)
  - Total: 155
- Time zone: UTC+3:30 (IRST)
  - Summer (DST): UTC+4:30 (IRDT)

Hamzehabad (Persian: حمزه اباد, also Romanized as Ḩamzehābād) is a village in Dasht-e Zarrin Rural District, in the Central District of Kuhrang County, Chaharmahal and Bakhtiari Province, Iran. At the 2006 census, its population was 155, in 25 families. The village is populated by Lurs.
