= Kaseh Garan, Kermanshah =

Kaseh Garan كاسه گران
- Village
- Location within Iran
- Coordinates: 34°05′26″N 46°01′47″E
- Country: Iran
- Province: Kermanshah
- County: Gilan-e Gharb
- Bakhsh: Central
- Rural District: Cheleh

Population (2006)
  - Total: 231
- Time zone: UTC+3:30 (IRST)
  - Summer (DST): UTC+4:30 (IRDT)

Kaseh Garan (Persian: كاسه گران, also Romanized as Kāseh Garān and Kāseh-ye Gerān; also known as Kāsākran and Kāseh Karān) is a village in Cheleh Rural District, in the Central District of Gilan-e Gharb County, Kermanshah Province, Iran. At the 2006 census, its population was 231, in 55 families.
