= Ahmad Gharib, Kohgiluyeh and Boyer-Ahmad =

Ahmad Gharib احمدغريب
- Village
- Location within Iran
- Coordinates: 30°57′07″N 51°17′06″E
- Country: Iran
- Province: Kohgiluyeh and Boyer-Ahmad
- County: Dana
- Bakhsh: Pataveh
- Rural District: Pataveh

Population (2006)
  - Total: 276
- Time zone: UTC+3:30 (IRST)
  - Summer (DST): UTC+4:30 (IRDT)

Ahmad Gharib (Persian: احمدغريب, also Romanized as Aḩmad Gharīb) is a village in Pataveh Rural District, Pataveh District, Dana County, Kohgiluyeh and Boyer-Ahmad Province, Iran. At the 2006 census, its population was 276, in 54 families.
