= Lahijan-e Gharbi Rural District =

Rural district in West Azerbaijan province, Iran

Lahijan-e Gharbi Rural District Persian: دهستان لاهيجان غربي
- Rural District
- Location within Iran
- Coordinates: 36°51′N 45°02′E
- Country: Iran
- Province: West Azerbaijan
- County: Piranshahr
- District: Lajan
- Established: 1987
- Capital: Silveh

Population (2016)
  - Total: 6,261
- Time zone: UTC+3:30 (IRST)

Lahijan-e Gharbi Rural District (Persian: دهستان لاهيجان غربي) is in Lajan District of Piranshahr County, West Azerbaijan province, Iran. Its capital is the village of Silveh. The previous capital of the rural district was the village of Darbekeh, now in Lahijan Rural District.

== Demographics ==
=== Population ===
At the time of the 2006 National Census, the rural district's population was 6,904 in 1,257 households. There were 7,169 inhabitants in 1,704 households at the following census of 2011. The 2016 census measured the population of the rural district as 6,261 in 1,614 households. The most populous of its 19 villages was Jaldian, with 1,570 people.

=== Other villages in the rural district ===
- Gerdeh Sur
- Khaldar
- Kulij
- Mashkan
- Qubeh
- Rezgari
