= Lahijan Rural District (Piranshahr County) =

Rural district in West Azerbaijan province, Iran

Lahijan Rural District Persian: دهستان لاهيجان
- Rural District
- Location within Iran
- Coordinates: 36°41′N 45°14′E
- Country: Iran
- Province: West Azerbaijan
- County: Piranshahr
- District: Central
- Established: 1991
- Capital: Darbekeh

Population (2016)
  - Total: 5,183
- Time zone: UTC+3:30 (IRST)

Lahijan Rural District (Persian: دهستان لاهيجان) is in the Central District of Piranshahr County, West Azerbaijan province, Iran. Its capital is the village of Darbekeh.

== Demographics ==
=== Population ===
At the time of the 2006 National Census, the rural district's population was 5,509 in 886 households. There were 5,481 inhabitants in 1,158 households at the following census of 2011. The 2016 census measured the population of the rural district as 5,183 in 1,246 households. The most populous of its 17 villages was Darbekeh, with 2,007 people.

=== Other villages in the rural district ===
- Berkmeran
- Kapaleh Hasan
- Kharapa
- Lavin
- Oshnuzang
- Rigabad
- Zangabad
