= Mangur-e Gharbi Rural District =

Rural district in West Azerbaijan province, Iran

Mangur-e Gharbi Rural District Persian: دهستان منگور غربی
- Rural District
- Location within Iran
- Coordinates: 36°30′N 45°16′E
- Country: Iran
- Province: West Azerbaijan
- County: Piranshahr
- District: Central
- Established: 1987
- Capital: Kuper

Population (2016)
  - Total: 9,090
- Time zone: UTC+3:30 (IRST)

Mangur-e Gharbi Rural District (Persian: دهستان منگور غربی) is in the Central District of Piranshahr County, West Azerbaijan province, Iran. Its capital is the village of Kuper.

== Demographics ==
=== Population ===
At the time of the 2006 National Census, the rural district's population was 9,120 in 1,330 households. There were 8,999 inhabitants in 1,885 households at the following census of 2011. The 2016 census measured the population of the rural district as 9,090 in 1,953 households. The most populous of its 49 villages was Kuper, with 958 people.

=== Other villages in the rural district ===
- Bastam Beg
- Bikus
- Gerd Rahmat
- Hangabad
- Hejran
- Kani Ashkut
- Qabar Hoseyn
- Qalat
- Shahrestan
- Tarkesh-e Sofla
