= Lahijan-e Sharqi Rural District =

Rural district in West Azerbaijan province, Iran

Lahijan-e Sharqi Rural District Persian: دهستان لاهيجان شرقي
- Rural District
- Location within Iran
- Coordinates: 36°43′N 45°22′E
- Country: Iran
- Province: West Azerbaijan
- County: Piranshahr
- District: Lajan
- Established: 1987
- Capital: Pasveh

Population (2016)
  - Total: 13,202
- Time zone: UTC+3:30 (IRST)

Lahijan-e Sharqi Rural District (Persian: دهستان لاهيجان شرقي) is in Lajan District of Piranshahr County, West Azerbaijan province, Iran. Its capital is the village of Pasveh.

== Demographics ==
=== Population ===
At the time of the 2006 National Census, the rural district's population was 14,537 in 2,443 households. There were 15,592 inhabitants in 3,306 households at the following census of 2011. The 2016 census measured the population of the rural district as 13,202 in 2,980 households. The most populous of its 58 villages was Pasveh, with 3,495 people.

=== Other villages in the rural district ===
- Gargul-e Sofla
- Gerdak-e Sepian
- Gerdeh Bon
- Khoranj
- Kileh Sepyan
- Kileh-ye Olya
- Lakben
- Misheh Deh-e Sofla
- Shalimjaran
- Tey 25 Pashahid Hoseyn Shahram Far
