= Central District (Piranshahr County) =

District in West Azerbaijan province, Iran

Central District (Piranshahr County) Persian: بخش مرکزی شهرستان پیرانشهر
- District
- Location within Iran
- Coordinates: 36°36′N 45°15′E
- Country: Iran
- Province: West Azerbaijan
- County: Piranshahr
- Capital: Piranshahr

Population (2016)
  - Total: 115,200
- Time zone: UTC+3:30 (IRST)

The Central District of Piranshahr County (Persian: بخش مرکزی شهرستان پیرانشهر) is in West Azerbaijan province, Iran. Its capital is the city of Piranshahr.

== Demographics ==
=== Population ===
At the time of the 2006 National Census, the district's population was 84,920 in 16,657 households. The following census in 2011 counted 99,205 people in 23,063 households. The 2016 census measured the population of the district as 115,200 inhabitants in 28,893 households.

=== Administrative divisions ===
Central District (Piranshahr County) Population
Administrative Divisions	2006	2011	2016
Lahijan RD	5,509	5,481	5,183
Mangur-e Gharbi RD	9,120	8,999	9,090
Piran RD	12,599	15,676	9,412
Piranshahr (city)	57,692	69,049	91,515
Total	84,920	99,205	115,200
RD = Rural District
