= Lajan District =

District in West Azerbaijan province, Iran

Lajan District Persian: بخش لاجان
- District
- Location within Iran
- Coordinates: 36°47′N 45°11′E
- Country: Iran
- Province: West Azerbaijan
- County: Piranshahr
- Established: 1995
- Capital: Lajan

Population (2016)
  - Total: 23,664
- Time zone: UTC+3:30 (IRST)

Lajan District (Persian: بخش لاجان) is in Piranshahr County, West Azerbaijan province, Iran. Its capital is the city of Lajan. (Note: Formerly Gerd Kashaneh)

== Demographics ==
=== Population ===
At the time of the 2006 National Census, the district's population was 22,757 in 3,960 households. The following census in 2011 counted 24,434 people in 5,362 households. The 2016 census measured the population of the district as 23,664 inhabitants in 5,667 households.

=== Administrative divisions ===
Lajan District Population
Administrative Divisions	2006	2011	2016
Lahijan-e Gharbi RD	6,904	7,169	6,261
Lahijan-e Sharqi RD	14,537	15,592	13,202
Lajan (city)	1,316	1,673	4,201
Total	22,757	24,434	23,664
RD = Rural District
