= Piranshahr County =

County in West Azerbaijan province, Iran

Piranshahr County Persian: شهرستان پیرانشهر
- County
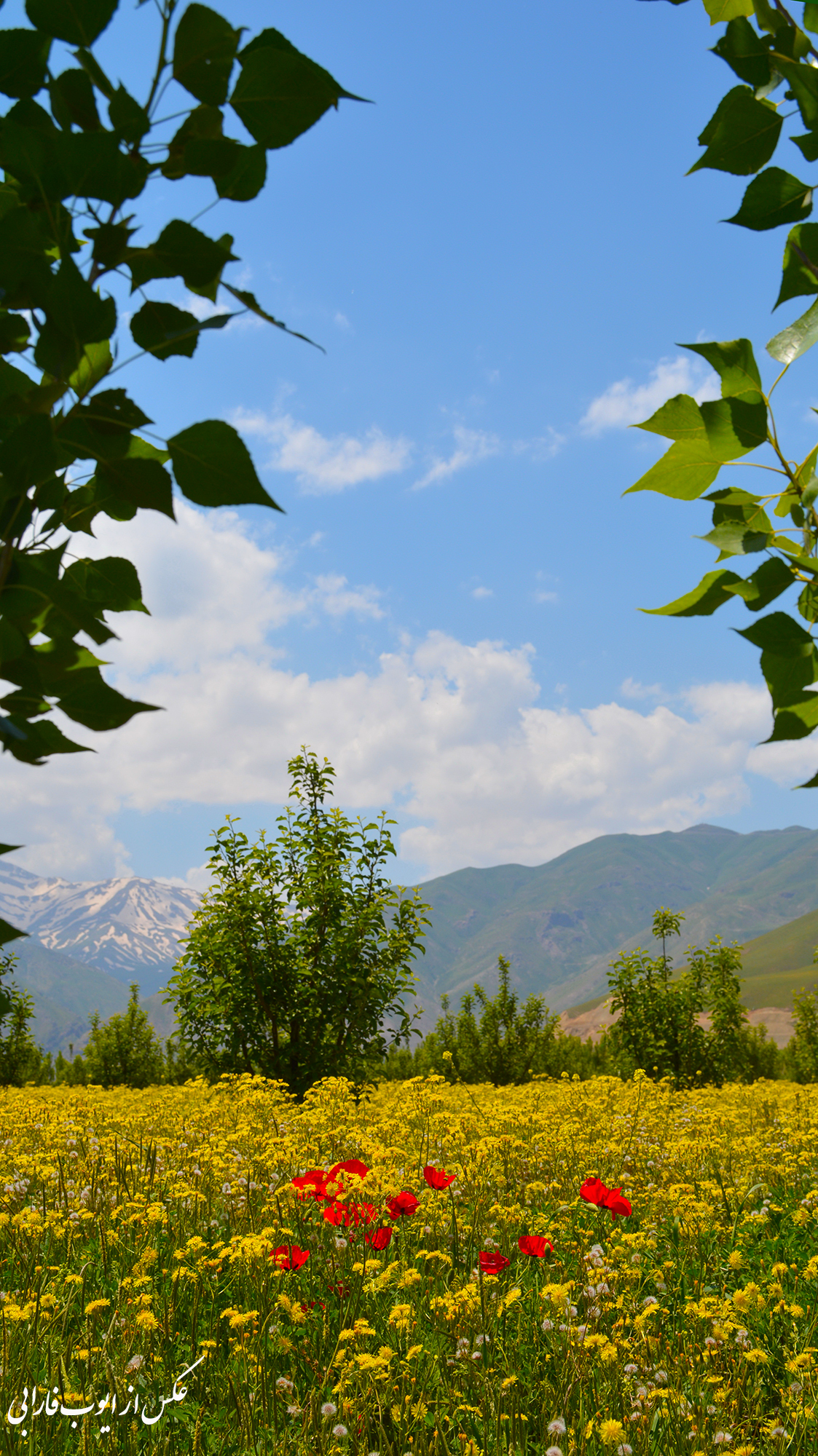
- Landscape in Piranshahr County

- Location of Piranshahr County in West Azerbaijan province (bottom left, purple)

- Location of West Azerbaijan province in Iran
- Coordinates: 36°40′N 45°12′E
- Country: Iran
- Province: West Azerbaijan
- Capital: Piranshahr
- Districts: Central, Lajan

Population (2016)
  - Total: 138,864
- Time zone: UTC+3:30 (IRST)

Piranshahr County (Persian: شهرستان پیرانشهر) is in West Azerbaijan province, Iran. Its capital is the city of Piranshahr.

== Demographics ==
=== Population ===
At the time of the 2006 National Census, the county's population was 107,677 in 20,617 households. The following census in 2011 counted 123,639 people in 28,415 households. The 2016 census measured the population of the county as 138,864 in 34,560 households.

=== Administrative divisions ===
Piranshahr County's population history and administrative structure over three consecutive censuses are shown in the following table.

Piranshahr County Population
Administrative Divisions	2006	2011	2016
Central District	84,920	99,205	115,200
Lahijan RD	5,509	5,481	5,183
Mangur-e Gharbi RD	9,120	8,999	9,090
Piran RD	12,599	15,676	9,412
Piranshahr (city)	57,692	69,049	91,515
Lajan District	22,757	24,434	23,664
Lahijan-e Gharbi RD	6,904	7,169	6,261
Lahijan-e Sharqi RD	14,537	15,592	13,202
Lajan (city) (Note: Formerly Gerd Kashaneh)	1,316	1,673	4,201
Total	107,677	123,639	138,864
RD = Rural District

== See also ==
Media related to Piranshahr County at Wikimedia Commons
