= Counties of Iran =

Local administrative divisions of Iran

Counties of Iran شهرستانهای ایران (Persian)
- Also known as: šahrestân شهرستان
- Found in: Provinces of Iran
- Number: 491
- Subdivisions: Districts of Iran

Iran's counties (Persian: شهرستان, romanized: šahrestân) are administrative divisions of larger provinces (ostan). The word shahrestan comes from the Iranian words شهر shahr (city) and ستان stân ("place, land"). "County", therefore, is a near equivalent to شهرستان (šahrestân).

Counties are divided into one or more districts (baxš بخش). A typical district includes both cities (šahr شهر) and rural districts (dehestân دهستان), which are groupings of adjacent villages. One city within the county serves as the capital of that county, generally in its Central District.

Each county is governed by an office known as farmândâri, which coordinates different public events and agencies and is headed by a farmândâr, the governor of the county and the highest-ranking official in the division.

Among the provinces of Iran, Fars has the highest number of shahrestans (37), while Qom has the fewest (3). In 2005 Iran had 324 shahrestans, while in 2026 there are 491.

== Guide ==
The total population of a province is the total of its counties.

The total population of a county is the total of its districts.

The total population of a district is the total of its cities and rural districts.

To better understand these subdivisions, the following table for Piranshahr County in West Azerbaijan province (as it existed in 2006, 2011 and 2016) is an example showing the hierarchy of a county's divisions:

Piranshahr County Population
| Administrative Divisions | 2006 | 2011 | 2016 |
|---|---|---|---|
| Central District | 84,920 | 99,205 | 115,200 |
| Lahijan Rural District | 5,509 | 5,481 | 5,183 |
| Mangur-e Gharbi Rural District | 9,120 | 8,999 | 9,090 |
| Piran Rural District | 12,599 | 15,676 | 9,412 |
| Piranshahr (city) | 57,692 | 69,049 | 91,515 |
| Lajan District | 22,757 | 24,434 | 23,664 |
| Lahijan-e Gharbi Rural District | 6,904 | 7,169 | 6,261 |
| Lahijan-e Sharqi Rural District | 14,537 | 15,592 | 13,202 |
| Gerd Kashaneh (city) | 1,316 | 1,673 | 4,201 |
| Total | 107,677 | 123,639 | 138,864 |

Population of Iranian provinces and counties in 2021.

== List ==
The counties are listed below, by province, with the capital and the county containing the capital of the provinces in bold:

| Province | No. of Counties | Name | Capital | Map |
|---|---|---|---|---|
| Alborz | 7 | Chaharbagh | Chaharbagh | |
| Alborz | 7 | Eshtehard | Eshtehard | |
| Alborz | 7 | Fardis | Fardis | |
| Alborz | 7 | **Karaj** | **Karaj** | |
| Alborz | 7 | Nazarabad | Nazarabad | |
| Alborz | 7 | Savojbolagh | Hashtgerd | |
| Alborz | 7 | Taleqan | Taleqan | |
| Ardabil | 12 | **Ardabil** | **Ardabil** | |
| Ardabil | 12 | Aslan Duz | Aslan Duz | |
| Ardabil | 12 | Bileh Savar | Bileh Savar | |
| Ardabil | 12 | Germi | Germi | |
| Ardabil | 12 | Khalkhal | Khalkhal | |
| Ardabil | 12 | Kowsar | Kivi | |
| Ardabil | 12 | Meshgin Shahr | Meshginshahr | |
| Ardabil | 12 | Namin | Namin | |
| Ardabil | 12 | Nir | Nir | |
| Ardabil | 12 | Parsabad | Parsabad | |
| Ardabil | 12 | Sareyn | Sareyn | |
| Ardabil | 12 | Ungut | Angut | |
| Bushehr | 10 | Asaluyeh | Asaluyeh | |
| Bushehr | 10 | **Bushehr** | **Bushehr** | |
| Bushehr | 10 | Dashtestan | Borazjan | |
| Bushehr | 10 | Dashti | Khormuj | |
| Bushehr | 10 | Deylam | Bandar Deylam | |
| Bushehr | 10 | Deyr | Bandar-e Dayyer | |
| Bushehr | 10 | Ganaveh | Bandar Ganaveh | |
| Bushehr | 10 | Jam | Jam | |
| Bushehr | 10 | Kangan | Bandar Kangan | |
| Bushehr | 10 | Tangestan | Ahram | |
| Chaharmahal and Bakhtiari | 12 | Ardal | Ardal | |
| Chaharmahal and Bakhtiari | 12 | Ben | Ben | |
| Chaharmahal and Bakhtiari | 12 | Borujen | Borujen | |
| Chaharmahal and Bakhtiari | 12 | Falard | Mal-e Khalifeh | |
| Chaharmahal and Bakhtiari | 12 | Farrokhshahr | Farrokh Shahr | |
| Chaharmahal and Bakhtiari | 12 | Farsan | Farsan | |
| Chaharmahal and Bakhtiari | 12 | Khanmirza | Aluni | |
| Chaharmahal and Bakhtiari | 12 | Kiar | Shalamzar | |
| Chaharmahal and Bakhtiari | 12 | Kuhrang | Chelgerd | |
| Chaharmahal and Bakhtiari | 12 | Lordegan | Lordegan | |
| Chaharmahal and Bakhtiari | 12 | Saman | Saman | |
| Chaharmahal and Bakhtiari | 12 | **Shahrekord** | **Shahr-e Kord** | |
| East Azerbaijan | 21 | Ahar | Ahar | |
| East Azerbaijan | 21 | Ajab Shir | Ajab Shir | |
| East Azerbaijan | 21 | Azarshahr | Azarshahr | |
| East Azerbaijan | 21 | Bonab | Bonab | |
| East Azerbaijan | 21 | Bostanabad | Bostanabad | |
| East Azerbaijan | 21 | Charuymaq | Qarah Aghaj | |
| East Azerbaijan | 21 | Hashtrud | Hashtrud | |
| East Azerbaijan | 21 | Heris | Heris | |
| East Azerbaijan | 21 | Hurand | Hurand | |
| East Azerbaijan | 21 | Jolfa | Jolfa | |
| East Azerbaijan | 21 | Kaleybar | Kaleybar | |
| East Azerbaijan | 21 | Khoda Afarin | Khomarlu | |
| East Azerbaijan | 21 | Malekan | Malekan | |
| East Azerbaijan | 21 | Maragheh | Maragheh | |
| East Azerbaijan | 21 | Marand | Marand | |
| East Azerbaijan | 21 | Mianeh | Mianeh | |
| East Azerbaijan | 21 | Osku | Osku | |
| East Azerbaijan | 21 | Sarab | Sarab | |
| East Azerbaijan | 21 | Shabestar | Shabestar | |
| East Azerbaijan | 21 | **Tabriz** | **Tabriz** | |
| East Azerbaijan | 21 | Varzaqan | Varzaqan | |
| Fars | 37 | Abadeh | Abadeh | |
| Fars | 37 | Arsanjan | Arsanjan | |
| Fars | 37 | Bakhtegan | Abadeh Tashk | |
| Fars | 37 | Bavanat | Bavanat | |
| Fars | 37 | Beyza | Beyza | |
| Fars | 37 | Darab | Darab | |
| Fars | 37 | Eqlid | Eqlid | |
| Fars | 37 | Estahban | Estahban | |
| Fars | 37 | Evaz | Evaz | |
| Fars | 37 | Farashband | Farashband | |
| Fars | 37 | Fasa | Fasa | |
| Fars | 37 | Firuzabad | Firuzabad | |
| Fars | 37 | Gerash | Gerash | |
| Fars | 37 | Jahrom | Jahrom | |
| Fars | 37 | Juyom | Juyom | |
| Fars | 37 | Kavar | Kavar | |
| Fars | 37 | Kazerun | Kazerun | |
| Fars | 37 | Khafr | Bab Anar | |
| Fars | 37 | Kharameh | Kharameh | |
| Fars | 37 | Khonj | Khonj | |
| Fars | 37 | Khorrambid | Safashahr | |
| Fars | 37 | Kuhchenar | Qaemiyeh | |
| Fars | 37 | Lamerd | Lamerd | |
| Fars | 37 | Larestan | Lar | |
| Fars | 37 | Mamasani | Nurabad | |
| Fars | 37 | Marvdasht | Marvdasht | |
| Fars | 37 | Mohr | Mohr | |
| Fars | 37 | Neyriz | Neyriz | |
| Fars | 37 | Pasargad | Saadat Shahr | |
| Fars | 37 | Qir and Karzin | Qir | |
| Fars | 37 | Rostam | Masiri | |
| Fars | 37 | Sarchehan | Hesami | |
| Fars | 37 | Sarvestan | Sarvestan | |
| Fars | 37 | Sepidan | Ardakan | |
| Fars | 37 | **Shiraz** | **Shiraz** | |
| Fars | 37 | Zarqan | Zarqan | |
| Fars | 37 | Zarrin Dasht | Hajjiabad | |
| Gilan | 17 | Amlash | Amlash | |
| Gilan | 17 | Astaneh-ye Ashrafiyeh | Astaneh-ye Ashrafiyeh | |
| Gilan | 17 | Astara | Astara | |
| Gilan | 17 | Bandar-e Anzali | Bandar-e Anzali | |
| Gilan | 17 | Fuman | Fuman | |
| Gilan | 17 | Khomam | Khomam | |
| Gilan | 17 | Lahijan | Lahijan | |
| Gilan | 17 | Langarud | Langarud | |
| Gilan | 17 | Masal | Masal | |
| Gilan | 17 | **Rasht** | **Rasht** | |
| Gilan | 17 | Rezvanshahr | Rezvanshahr | |
| Gilan | 17 | Rudbar | Rudbar | |
| Gilan | 17 | Rudsar | Rudsar | |
| Gilan | 17 | Shaft | Shaft | |
| Gilan | 17 | Siahkal | Siahkal | |
| Gilan | 17 | Sowme'eh Sara | Sowme'eh Sara | |
| Gilan | 17 | Talesh | Tālesh | |
| Golestan | 14 | Aliabad | Aliabad-e Katul | |
| Golestan | 14 | Aqqala | Aqqala | |
| Golestan | 14 | Azadshahr | Azadshahr | |
| Golestan | 14 | Bandar-e Gaz | Bandar-e Gaz | |
| Golestan | 14 | Galikash | Galikash | |
| Golestan | 14 | Gomishan | Gomishan | |
| Golestan | 14 | Gonbad-e Kavus | Gonbad-e Kavus | |
| Golestan | 14 | **Gorgan** | **Gorgan** | |
| Golestan | 14 | Kalaleh | Kalaleh | |
| Golestan | 14 | Kordkuy | Kordkuy | |
| Golestan | 14 | Maraveh Tappeh | Maraveh Tappeh | |
| Golestan | 14 | Minudasht | Minudasht | |
| Golestan | 14 | Ramian | Ramian | |
| Golestan | 14 | Torkaman | Bandar Torkaman | |
| Hamadan | 10 | Asadabad | Asadabad | |
| Hamadan | 10 | Bahar | Bahar | |
| Hamadan | 10 | Dargazin | Qorveh-e Dargazin | |
| Hamadan | 10 | Famenin | Famenin | |
| Hamadan | 10 | **Hamadan** | **Hamadan** | |
| Hamadan | 10 | Kabudarahang | Kabudarahang | |
| Hamadan | 10 | Malayer | Malayer | |
| Hamadan | 10 | Nahavand | Nahavand | |
| Hamadan | 10 | Razan | Razan | |
| Hamadan | 10 | Tuyserkan | Tuyserkan | |
| Hormozgan | 13 | Abumusa | Abu Musa | |
| Hormozgan | 13 | **Bandar Abbas** | **Bandar Abbas** | |
| Hormozgan | 13 | Bandar Lengeh | Bandar Lengeh | |
| Hormozgan | 13 | Bashagard | Sardasht | |
| Hormozgan | 13 | Bastak | Bastak | |
| Hormozgan | 13 | Hajjiabad | Hajjiabad | |
| Hormozgan | 13 | Jask | Jask | |
| Hormozgan | 13 | Khamir | Banda Khamir | |
| Hormozgan | 13 | Minab | Minab | |
| Hormozgan | 13 | Parsian | Parsian | |
| Hormozgan | 13 | Qeshm | Qeshm | |
| Hormozgan | 13 | Rudan | Rudan | |
| Hormozgan | 13 | Sirik | Bandar Sirik | |
| Ilam | 12 | Abdanan | Abdanan | |
| Ilam | 12 | Badreh | Badreh | |
| Ilam | 12 | Chardavol | Sarableh | |
| Ilam | 12 | Chavar | Chavar | |
| Ilam | 12 | Darreh Shahr | Darreh Shahr | |
| Ilam | 12 | Dehloran | Dehloran | |
| Ilam | 12 | Eyvan | Eyvan | |
| Ilam | 12 | Holeylan | Towhid | |
| Ilam | 12 | **Ilam** | **Ilam** | |
| Ilam | 12 | Malekshahi | Arkavaz | |
| Ilam | 12 | Mehran | Mehran | |
| Ilam | 12 | Sirvan | Lumar | |
| Isfahan | 28 | Aran va Bidgol | Aran o Bidgol | |
| Isfahan | 28 | Ardestan | Ardestan | |
| Isfahan | 28 | Borkhar | Dowlatabad | |
| Isfahan | 28 | Buin Miandasht | Buin Miandasht | |
| Isfahan | 28 | Chadegan | Chadegan | |
| Isfahan | 28 | Dehaqan | Dehaqan | |
| Isfahan | 28 | Falavarjan | Falavarjan | |
| Isfahan | 28 | Faridan | Daran | |
| Isfahan | 28 | Fereydunshahr | Fereydunshahr | |
| Isfahan | 28 | Golpayegan | Golpayegan | |
| Isfahan | 28 | Harand | Harand | |
| Isfahan | 28 | **Isfahan** | **Isfahan** | |
| Isfahan | 28 | Jarqavieh | Nikabad | |
| Isfahan | 28 | Kashan | Kashan | |
| Isfahan | 28 | Khansar | Khansar | |
| Isfahan | 28 | Khomeyni Shahr | Khomeyni Shahr | |
| Isfahan | 28 | Khur and Biabanak | Khur | |
| Isfahan | 28 | Kuhpayeh | Tudeshk | |
| Isfahan | 28 | Lenjan | Zarrin Shahr | |
| Isfahan | 28 | Mobarakeh | Mobarakeh | |
| Isfahan | 28 | Nain | Nain | |
| Isfahan | 28 | Najafabad | Najafabad | |
| Isfahan | 28 | Natanz | Natanz | |
| Isfahan | 28 | Semirom | Semirom | |
| Isfahan | 28 | Shahin Shahr and Meymeh | Shahin Shahr | |
| Isfahan | 28 | Shahreza | Shahreza | |
| Isfahan | 28 | Tiran and Karvan | Tiran | |
| Isfahan | 28 | Varzaneh | Varzaneh | |
| Kerman | 25 | Anar | Anar | |
| Kerman | 25 | Anbarabad | Anbarabad | |
| Kerman | 25 | Arzuiyeh | Arzuiyeh | |
| Kerman | 25 | Baft | Baft | |
| Kerman | 25 | Bam | Bam | |
| Kerman | 25 | Bardsir | Bardsir | |
| Kerman | 25 | Fahraj | Fahraj | |
| Kerman | 25 | Faryab | Faryab | |
| Kerman | 25 | Gonbaki | Gonbaki | |
| Kerman | 25 | Jazmurian | Zeh-e Kalut | |
| Kerman | 25 | Jiroft | Jiroft | |
| Kerman | 25 | Kahnuj | Kahnuj | |
| Kerman | 25 | **Kerman** | **Kerman** | |
| Kerman | 25 | Kuhbanan | Kuhbanan | |
| Kerman | 25 | Manujan | Manujan | |
| Kerman | 25 | Narmashir | Narmashir | |
| Kerman | 25 | Qaleh Ganj | Qaleh Ganj | |
| Kerman | 25 | Rabor | Rabor | |
| Kerman | 25 | Rafsanjan | Rafsanjan | |
| Kerman | 25 | Ravar | Ravar | |
| Kerman | 25 | Rigan | Mohammadabad | |
| Kerman | 25 | Rudbar-e Jonubi | Rudbar | |
| Kerman | 25 | Shahr-e Babak | Shahr-e Babak | |
| Kerman | 25 | Sirjan | Sirjan | |
| Kerman | 25 | Zarand | Zarand | |
| Kermanshah | 14 | Dalahu | Kerend-e Gharb | |
| Kermanshah | 14 | Gilan-e Gharb | Gilan-e Gharb | |
| Kermanshah | 14 | Harsin | Harsin | |
| Kermanshah | 14 | Javanrud | Javanrud | |
| Kermanshah | 14 | Kangavar | Kangavar | |
| Kermanshah | 14 | **Kermanshah** | **Kermanshah** | |
| Kermanshah | 14 | Paveh | Paveh | |
| Kermanshah | 14 | Qasr-e Shirin | Qasr-e Shirin | |
| Kermanshah | 14 | Ravansar | Ravansar | |
| Kermanshah | 14 | Sahneh | Sahneh | |
| Kermanshah | 14 | Salas-e Babajani | Tazehabad | |
| Kermanshah | 14 | Sarpol-e Zahab | Sarpol-e Zahab | |
| Kermanshah | 14 | Shahabad-e Gharb | Shahabad-e Gharb | |
| Kermanshah | 14 | Sonqor | Sonqor | |
| Khuzestan | 30 | Abadan | Abadan | |
| Khuzestan | 30 | Aghajri | Aghajri | |
| Khuzestan | 30 | **Ahvaz** | **Ahvaz** | |
| Khuzestan | 30 | Andika | Qaleh-ye Khvajeh | |
| Khuzestan | 30 | Andimeshk | Andimeshk | |
| Khuzestan | 30 | Bagh-e Malek | Bagh-e Malek | |
| Khuzestan | 30 | Bavi | Mollasani | |
| Khuzestan | 30 | Behbahan | Behbahan | |
| Khuzestan | 30 | Dasht-e Azadegan | Susangerd | |
| Khuzestan | 30 | Dezful | Dezful | |
| Khuzestan | 30 | Dezpart | Dehdez | |
| Khuzestan | 30 | Gotvand | Gotvand | |
| Khuzestan | 30 | Haftkel | Haftkel | |
| Khuzestan | 30 | Hamidiyeh | Hamidiyeh | |
| Khuzestan | 30 | Hendijan | Hendijan | |
| Khuzestan | 30 | Hoveyzeh | Hoveyzeh | |
| Khuzestan | 30 | Izeh | Izeh | |
| Khuzestan | 30 | Karkheh | Alvan | |
| Khuzestan | 30 | Karun | Kut-e Abdollah | |
| Khuzestan | 30 | Khorramshahr | Khorramshahr | |
| Khuzestan | 30 | Lali | Lali | |
| Khuzestan | 30 | Mahshahr | Bandar-e Mahshahr | |
| Khuzestan | 30 | Masjed Soleyman | Masjed Soleyman | |
| Khuzestan | 30 | Omidiyeh | Omidiyeh | |
| Khuzestan | 30 | Ramhormoz | Ramhormoz | |
| Khuzestan | 30 | Ramshir | Ramshir | |
| Khuzestan | 30 | Seydun | Seydun | |
| Khuzestan | 30 | Shadegan | Shadegan | |
| Khuzestan | 30 | Shush | Shush | |
| Khuzestan | 30 | Shushtar | Shushtar | |
| Kohgiluyeh and Boyer-Ahmad | 9 | Bahmai | Likak | |
| Kohgiluyeh and Boyer-Ahmad | 9 | Basht | Basht | |
| Kohgiluyeh and Boyer-Ahmad | 9 | **Boyer-Ahmad** | **Yasuj** | |
| Kohgiluyeh and Boyer-Ahmad | 9 | Charam | Charam | |
| Kohgiluyeh and Boyer-Ahmad | 9 | Dana | Sisakht | |
| Kohgiluyeh and Boyer-Ahmad | 9 | Gachsaran | Dogonbadan | |
| Kohgiluyeh and Boyer-Ahmad | 9 | Kohgiluyeh | Dehdasht | |
| Kohgiluyeh and Boyer-Ahmad | 9 | Landeh | Landeh | |
| Kohgiluyeh and Boyer-Ahmad | 9 | Margown | Margown | |
| Kurdistan | 10 | Baneh | Baneh | |
| Kurdistan | 10 | Bijar | Bijar | |
| Kurdistan | 10 | Dehgolan | Dehgolan | |
| Kurdistan | 10 | Divandarreh | Divandarreh | |
| Kurdistan | 10 | Kamyaran | Kamyaran | |
| Kurdistan | 10 | Marivan | Marivan | |
| Kurdistan | 10 | Qorveh | Qorveh | |
| Kurdistan | 10 | **Sanandaj** | **Sanandaj** | |
| Kurdistan | 10 | Saqqez | Saqqez | |
| Kurdistan | 10 | Sarvabad | Sarvabad | |
| Lorestan | 11 | Aligudarz | Aligudarz | |
| Lorestan | 11 | Azna | Azna | |
| Lorestan | 11 | Borujerd | Borujerd | |
| Lorestan | 11 | Delfan | Nurabad | |
| Lorestan | 11 | Dorud | Dorud | |
| Lorestan | 11 | Dowreh | Sarab-e Dowreh | |
| Lorestan | 11 | **Khorramabad** | **Khorramabad** | |
| Lorestan | 11 | Kuhdasht | Kuhdasht | |
| Lorestan | 11 | Pol-e Dokhtar | Pol-e Dokhtar | |
| Lorestan | 11 | Rumeshkan | Chaqabol | |
| Lorestan | 11 | Selseleh | Aleshtar | |
| Markazi | 12 | **Arak** | **Arak** | |
| Markazi | 12 | Ashtian | Ashtian | |
| Markazi | 12 | Delijan | Delijan | |
| Markazi | 12 | Farahan | Farmahin | |
| Markazi | 12 | Khomeyn | Khomeyn | |
| Markazi | 12 | Khondab | Khondab | |
| Markazi | 12 | Komijan | Komijan | |
| Markazi | 12 | Mahallat | Mahallat | |
| Markazi | 12 | Saveh | Saveh | |
| Markazi | 12 | Shazand | Shazand | |
| Markazi | 12 | Tafresh | Tafresh | |
| Markazi | 12 | Zarandiyeh | Mamuniyeh | |
| Mazandaran | 22 | Abbasabad | Abbasabad | |
| Mazandaran | 22 | Amol | Amol | |
| Mazandaran | 22 | Babol | Babol | |
| Mazandaran | 22 | Babolsar | Babolsar | |
| Mazandaran | 22 | Behshahr | Behshahr | |
| Mazandaran | 22 | Chalus | Chalus | |
| Mazandaran | 22 | Fereydunkenar | Fereydunkenar | |
| Mazandaran | 22 | Galugah | Galugah | |
| Mazandaran | 22 | Juybar | Juybar | |
| Mazandaran | 22 | Kelardasht | Kelardasht | |
| Mazandaran | 22 | Mahmudabad | Mahmudabad | |
| Mazandaran | 22 | Miandorud | Surak | |
| Mazandaran | 22 | Neka | Neka | |
| Mazandaran | 22 | North Savadkuh | Shirgah | |
| Mazandaran | 22 | Nowshahr | Nowshahr | |
| Mazandaran | 22 | Nur | Nur | |
| Mazandaran | 22 | Qaem Shahr | Qaem Shahr | |
| Mazandaran | 22 | Ramsar | Ramsar | |
| Mazandaran | 22 | **Sari** | **Sari** | |
| Mazandaran | 22 | Savadkuh | Pol-e Sefid | |
| Mazandaran | 22 | Simorgh | Kiakola | |
| Mazandaran | 22 | Tonekabon | Tonekabon | |
| North Khorasan | 10 | Bam and Safiabad | Safiabad | |
| North Khorasan | 10 | **Bojnord** | **Bojnord** | |
| North Khorasan | 10 | Esfarayen | Esfarayen | |
| North Khorasan | 10 | Faruj | Faruj | |
| North Khorasan | 10 | Garmeh | Garmeh | |
| North Khorasan | 10 | Jajrom | Jajrom | |
| North Khorasan | 10 | Maneh | Pish Qaleh | |
| North Khorasan | 10 | Raz and Jargalan | Raz | |
| North Khorasan | 10 | Samalqan | Ashkhaneh | |
| North Khorasan | 10 | Shirvan | Shirvan | |
| Qazvin | 6 | Abyek | Abyek | |
| Qazvin | 6 | Alborz | Alvand | |
| Qazvin | 6 | Avaj | Avaj | |
| Qazvin | 6 | Buin Zahra | Buin Zahra | |
| Qazvin | 6 | **Qazvin** | **Qazvin** | |
| Qazvin | 6 | Takestan | Takestan | |
| Qom | 3 | Jafarabad | Jafariyeh | |
| Qom | 3 | Kahak | Kahak | |
| Qom | 3 | **Qom** | **Qom** | |
| Razavi Khorasan | 34 | Bajestan | Bajestan | |
| Razavi Khorasan | 34 | Bakharz | Bakharz | |
| Razavi Khorasan | 34 | Bardaskan | Bardaskan | |
| Razavi Khorasan | 34 | Chenaran | Chenaran | |
| Razavi Khorasan | 34 | Dargaz | Dargaz | |
| Razavi Khorasan | 34 | Davarzan | Davarzan | |
| Razavi Khorasan | 34 | Fariman | Fariman | |
| Razavi Khorasan | 34 | Firuzeh | Firuzeh | |
| Razavi Khorasan | 34 | Golbahar | Golbahar | |
| Razavi Khorasan | 34 | Gonabad | Gonabad | |
| Razavi Khorasan | 34 | Joghatai | Joghatai | |
| Razavi Khorasan | 34 | Joveyn | Neqab | |
| Razavi Khorasan | 34 | Kalat | Kalat | |
| Razavi Khorasan | 34 | Kashmar | Kashmar | |
| Razavi Khorasan | 34 | Khaf | Khaf | |
| Razavi Khorasan | 34 | Khalilabad | Khalilabad | |
| Razavi Khorasan | 34 | Khoshab | Soltanabad | |
| Razavi Khorasan | 34 | Kuhsorkh | Rivash | |
| Razavi Khorasan | 34 | Mahvelat | Feyzabad | |
| Razavi Khorasan | 34 | **Mashhad** | **Mashhad** | |
| Razavi Khorasan | 34 | Miyan Jolgeh | Eshqabad | |
| Razavi Khorasan | 34 | Nishapur | Nishapur | |
| Razavi Khorasan | 34 | Quchan | Quchan | |
| Razavi Khorasan | 34 | Roshtkhar | Roshtkhar | |
| Razavi Khorasan | 34 | Sabzevar | Sabzevar | |
| Razavi Khorasan | 34 | Salehabad | Salehabad | |
| Razavi Khorasan | 34 | Sarakhs | Sarakhs | |
| Razavi Khorasan | 34 | Sheshtamad | Sheshtomad | |
| Razavi Khorasan | 34 | Taybad | Taybad | |
| Razavi Khorasan | 34 | Torbat-e Heydarieh | Torbat-e Heydarieh | |
| Razavi Khorasan | 34 | Torbat-e Jam | Torbat-e Jam | |
| Razavi Khorasan | 34 | Torqabeh and Shandiz | Torqabeh | |
| Razavi Khorasan | 34 | Zaveh | Dowlatabad | |
| Razavi Khorasan | 34 | Zeberkhan | Qadamgah | |
| Semnan | 8 | Aradan | Aradan | |
| Semnan | 8 | Damghan | Damghan | |
| Semnan | 8 | Garmsar | Garmsar | |
| Semnan | 8 | Mehdishahr | Mehdishahr | |
| Semnan | 8 | Meyami | Meyami | |
| Semnan | 8 | **Semnan** | **Semnan** | |
| Semnan | 8 | Shahrud | Shahrud | |
| Semnan | 8 | Sorkheh | Sorkheh | |
| Sistan and Baluchistan | 26 | Bampur | Bampur | |
| Sistan and Baluchistan | 26 | Chabahar | Chabahar | |
| Sistan and Baluchistan | 26 | Dalgan | Galmurti | |
| Sistan and Baluchistan | 26 | Dashtiari | Negur | |
| Sistan and Baluchistan | 26 | Fanuj | Fanuj | |
| Sistan and Baluchistan | 26 | Golshan | Jaleq | |
| Sistan and Baluchistan | 26 | Hamun | Mohammadabad | |
| Sistan and Baluchistan | 26 | Hirmand | Dust Mohammad | |
| Sistan and Baluchistan | 26 | Iranshahr | Iranshahr | |
| Sistan and Baluchistan | 26 | Khash | Khash | |
| Sistan and Baluchistan | 26 | Konarak | Konarak | |
| Sistan and Baluchistan | 26 | Lashar | Espakeh | |
| Sistan and Baluchistan | 26 | Mehrestan | Mehrestan | |
| Sistan and Baluchistan | 26 | Mirjaveh | Mirjaveh | |
| Sistan and Baluchistan | 26 | Nik Shahr | Nik Shahr | |
| Sistan and Baluchistan | 26 | Nimruz | Adimi | |
| Sistan and Baluchistan | 26 | Qasr-e Qand | Qasr-e Qand | |
| Sistan and Baluchistan | 26 | Rask | Rask | |
| Sistan and Baluchistan | 26 | Saravan | Saravan | |
| Sistan and Baluchistan | 26 | Sarbaz | Sarbaz | |
| Sistan and Baluchistan | 26 | Sib and Suran | Suran | |
| Sistan and Baluchistan | 26 | Taftan | Nukabad | |
| Sistan and Baluchistan | 26 | Zabol | Zabol | |
| Sistan and Baluchistan | 26 | **Zahedan** | **Zahedan** | |
| Sistan and Baluchistan | 26 | Zarabad | Zarabad | |
| Sistan and Baluchistan | 26 | Zehak | Zehak | |
| South Khorasan | 11 | **Birjand** | **Birjand** | |
| South Khorasan | 11 | Boshruyeh | Boshruyeh | |
| South Khorasan | 11 | Darmian | Asadiyeh | |
| South Khorasan | 11 | Ferdows | Ferdows | |
| South Khorasan | 11 | Khusf | Khusf | |
| South Khorasan | 11 | Nehbandan | Nehbandan | |
| South Khorasan | 11 | Qaen | Qaen | |
| South Khorasan | 11 | Sarayan | Sarayan | |
| South Khorasan | 11 | Sarbisheh | Sarbisheh | |
| South Khorasan | 11 | Tabas | Tabas | |
| South Khorasan | 11 | Zirkuh | Hajjiabad | |
| Tehran | 16 | Baharestan | Nasimshahr | |
| Tehran | 16 | Damavand | Damavand | |
| Tehran | 16 | Eslamshahr | Eslamshahr | |
| Tehran | 16 | Firuzkuh | Firuzkuh | |
| Tehran | 16 | Malard | Malard | |
| Tehran | 16 | Pakdasht | Pakdasht | |
| Tehran | 16 | Pardis | Pardis | |
| Tehran | 16 | Pishva | Pishva | |
| Tehran | 16 | Qarchak | Qarchak | |
| Tehran | 16 | Qods | Qods | |
| Tehran | 16 | Ray | Ray | |
| Tehran | 16 | Robat Karim | Robat Karim | |
| Tehran | 16 | Shahriar | Shahriar | |
| Tehran | 16 | Shemiranat | Shemiran | |
| Tehran | 16 | **Tehran** | **Tehran** | |
| Tehran | 16 | Varamin | Varamin | |
| West Azerbaijan | 20 | Baruq | Baruq | |
| West Azerbaijan | 20 | Bukan | Bukan | |
| West Azerbaijan | 20 | Chaharborj | Chahar Borj | |
| West Azerbaijan | 20 | Chaldoran | Siah Cheshmeh | |
| West Azerbaijan | 20 | Chaypareh | Qarah Zia od Din | |
| West Azerbaijan | 20 | Khoy | Khoy | |
| West Azerbaijan | 20 | Mahabad | Mahabad | |
| West Azerbaijan | 20 | Maku | Maku | |
| West Azerbaijan | 20 | Miandoab | Miandoab | |
| West Azerbaijan | 20 | Mirabad | Mirabad | |
| West Azerbaijan | 20 | Naqadeh | Naqadeh | |
| West Azerbaijan | 20 | Oshnavieh | Oshnavieh | |
| West Azerbaijan | 20 | Piranshahr | Piranshahr | |
| West Azerbaijan | 20 | Poldasht | Poldasht | |
| West Azerbaijan | 20 | Salmas | Salmas | |
| West Azerbaijan | 20 | Sardasht | Sardasht | |
| West Azerbaijan | 20 | Shahin Dezh | Shahin Dezh | |
| West Azerbaijan | 20 | Showt | Showt | |
| West Azerbaijan | 20 | Takab | Takab | |
| West Azerbaijan | 20 | **Urmia** | **Urmia** | |
| Yazd | 12 | Abarkuh | Abarkuh | |
| Yazd | 12 | Ardakan | Ardakan | |
| Yazd | 12 | Ashkezar | Ashkezar | |
| Yazd | 12 | Bafq | Bafq | |
| Yazd | 12 | Behabad | Behabad | |
| Yazd | 12 | Khatam | Herat | |
| Yazd | 12 | Marvast | Marvast | |
| Yazd | 12 | Mehriz | Mehriz | |
| Yazd | 12 | Meybod | Meybod | |
| Yazd | 12 | Taft | Taft | |
| Yazd | 12 | **Yazd** | **Yazd** | |
| Yazd | 12 | Zarach | Zarach | |
| Zanjan | 8 | Abhar | Abhar | |
| Zanjan | 8 | Ijrud | Zarrinabad | |
| Zanjan | 8 | Khodabandeh | Qeydar | |
| Zanjan | 8 | Khorramdarreh | Khorramdarreh | |
| Zanjan | 8 | Mahneshan | Mah Neshan | |
| Zanjan | 8 | Soltaniyeh | Soltaniyeh | |
| Zanjan | 8 | Tarom | Ab Bar | |
| Zanjan | 8 | **Zanjan** | **Zanjan** | |

== See also ==
- Bakhsh
