= Tsuyoshi Nagano =

Japanese illustrator

Tsuyoshi Nagano (長野 剛, Nagano Tsuyoshi) (born 1961) is a Japanese illustrator most famous for doing the cover artwork for the Romance of the Three Kingdoms games by Koei since the 1980s. His art style is realism and surrealism. He also has done the Japanese editions of novels such as the New Jedi Order, Jedi Quest, Last of the Jedi, Dark Nest, and Shatterpoint, as well as illustrations for Nobunaga's Ambition and Godzilla, Mothra and King Ghidorah: Giant Monsters All-Out Attack.
