= Godzilla, Mothra and King Ghidorah: Giant Monsters All-Out Attack (soundtrack) =

2001 soundtrack album by Kow Otani

Godzilla, Mothra and King Ghidorah: Giant Monsters All-Out Attack (Original Soundtrack)

Soundtrack album by Kow Otani
- Released: December 12, 2001
- Recorded: October 2001
- Studio: Toho Studios
- Genre: Electronic; techno; orchestral
- Length: 57:35
- Language: Japanese
- Label: Tokuma Japan Communications
- Producer: Kyoko Kitahara

Godzilla, Mothra and King Ghidorah: Giant Monsters All-Out Attack (Original Soundtrack) is the soundtrack album to the 2001 Japanese kaiju film Godzilla, Mothra and King Ghidorah: Giant Monsters All-Out Attack, composed by Kow Otani, a frequent collaborator of the film's director, Shusuke Kaneko. Otani created a distinctive score that blended orchestral and electronic elements with techno influences, deliberately avoiding Akira Ifukube's Godzilla style and his own earlier Gamera scores. He drew inspiration from the progressive rock band Goblin and his own score for Shokoki! (2001).

The original soundtrack album, featuring 36 tracks from the film score, was released on December 12, 2001, by Tokuma Japan Communications and runs for 57 minutes. In April 2010, Toho Records released an expanded edition that runs approximately 75 minutes and includes bonus tracks and demos.

== Background and recording ==
The film's composer Kow Otani was a frequent collaborator of director Shusuke Kaneko at the time. Otani sought to create a distinctive soundtrack that avoided direct imitation of the iconic compositions of Akira Ifukube, whose work had defined many previous Godzilla films, while also distinguishing it from his own scores for the Heisei Gamera trilogy. He consciously refrained from using any melodic phrases reminiscent of his Gamera compositions to avoid criticism of self-imitation, which he described as a significant creative challenge. Otani was actively working on the GMK score several months before recording sessions began.

Unlike the grand orchestral scores of the Heisei Gamera series, GMK prominently featured electronic instruments and a techno-influenced style. Otani initially considered evoking a Japanese worldview akin to that of composer Tōru Takemitsu, but after reading the script, he deemed this approach unsuitable. Instead drew on the electronic and techno elements from his previous film Shokoki! (2001). For additional inspiration, he drew from the Italian progressive rock band Goblin, known for their horror and suspense film scores. He was introduced to Goblin's music by Norman England, a set reporter who covered the production of GMK.

Otani observed that, despite the opposition between the malevolent Godzilla and guardian monsters (Mothra, Baragon, and King Ghidorah), they shared a common mythological essence. Accordingly, he composed their themes in the unified key of A minor: Godzilla's motif employed low-register brass and strings such as trombones and double basses for a heavy, ominous quality; Mothra's featured a female chorus; and King Ghidorah's a male chorus. Baragon, however, received no individual theme, as the score instead included a dedicated motif for the Tachibana father and daughter. The soundtrack recording session occurred on October 7, 2001; nine men sang Ghidorah's chorus while ten women did Mothra's.

Godzilla's theme was deliberately crafted to be simple and easily hummable, in the spirit of Ifukube's iconic Godzilla motif, rather than overly intricate. Otani refined the piece iteratively while watching footage of Godzilla's battle against Baragon at Ōwakudani, ultimately producing approximately 5,000 variations of tones before arriving at the final version. The choruses accompanying Mothra and King Ghidorah were performed by 20 students recruited through Otani's daughter, who was then a composition major at Toho Gakuen School of Music. Otani believed these youthful, unrefined voices were better suited to conveying ancient, mythological storytelling than those of professional singers. On the other hand, the Mothra theme incorporated pseudo-lyrics inspired by elements of the Japonic and Ainu languages; portions of the script were read in reverse to generate abstract, non-semantic vocal sounds.

The theme for the Japan Self-Defense Forces was derived from one of three early candidate motifs composed for Godzilla, with a snare drum added to impart a marching cadence. The motif for the Tachibana father and daughter subtly paid homage to Ifukube's Godzilla theme. Otani included the reference discreetly after initial requests for permission were turned down; interviewers later observed its resemblance before he openly confirmed the intention.

The end credits incorporated Ifukube's original "Godzilla Theme" and "War of the Monsters March", the latter from the soundtrack of Invasion of Astro-Monster (1965). Kaneko noted that the decision to feature these classic cues had been made at the start of production.

== Track listing ==
=== 2001 soundtrack ===
Original 2001 soundtrack
No.	Title	Length
1.	"Call to Arms"	2:16
2.	"Main Title"	1:33
3.	"The Huge Fang"	0:50
4.	"The Menacing Claw Mark"	0:47
5.	"Incident at the Lake Shore"	1:18
6.	"The Mysterious Old Man"	2:23
7.	"The Giant Foot"	0:33
8.	"The Sleeping Three-Headed Dragon"	0:46
9.	"Dark Vision"	0:58
10.	"God of the Earth: Baragon"	1:14
11.	"The God of Destruction Appears"	0:52
12.	"Terrifying Landing"	0:47
13.	"The Forgotten Horror"	1:05
14.	"Confrontation of the Two Giant Monsters"	2:00
15.	"The Sacred Beast's Ambush"	3:08
16.	"God of the Sea: Mothra"	1:22
17.	"Unleashed Spirits of the War Dead"	1:24
18.	"Attack Preparation"	0:45
19.	"A Tense Moment"	1:11
20.	"God of the Sky: King Ghidorah"	1:44
21.	"GMK"	1:33
22.	"Godzilla's Rage"	2:47
23.	"Determined to Protect the Future"	3:53
24.	"Mysterious Power"	1:17
25.	"The Miracle of the Three Sacred Beasts"	2:30
26.	"A Desperate Crisis"	1:03
27.	"Escape from Godzilla"	0:37
28.	"A Salute to the Spirits of the War Dead"	3:30
29.	"End Roll: Godzilla Theme ~ Great Monster War March ~ Main Title" (Composer: Akira Ifukube)	4:43
30.	"Godzilla Theme" (Composer: Akira Ifukube)	2:50
31.	"Great Monster War March" (Composer: Akira Ifukube)	3:09
32.	"SE Source: Godzilla (Roar, Breath, Ray)"	1:04
33.	"SE Source: Baragon (Roar)"	0:27
34.	"SE Source: Mothra Larva (Roar)"	0:09
35.	"SE Source: Mothra (Roar, Movement Sound)"	0:36
36.	"SE Source: King Ghidorah (Roar, Flight Sound)"	0:32
Total length:		57:35

=== 2010 expanded edition ===
2010 Expanded Edition
No.	Title	Length
1.	"Call to Arms (M1)"
2.	"Main Title (M2)"
3.	"Village Spirits (M3)"
4.	"The Huge Fang (M4)"
5.	"The Menacing Claw Mark (M5)"
6.	"Protection: The Legendary Sacred Beasts (M6)"
7.	"Incident at the Lake Shore (M7)"
8.	"Premonition (M8)"
9.	"The Mysterious Old Man (M9)"
10.	"The Giant Foot (M10)"
11.	"Cries of Sorrow (M11)"
12.	"The Arcane Stone (M12)"
13.	"The Sleeping Three-Headed Dragon (M13)"
14.	"Cruiser Aizu (M14)"
15.	"Dark Vision (M15)"
16.	"Revived Legend (M16)"
17.	"God of the Earth: Baragon (M17)"
18.	"The God of Destruction Appears (M18)"
19.	"Terrifying Landing (M19)"
20.	"The Forgotten Horror (M20)"
21.	"Confrontation of the Two Giant Monsters (M21)"
22.	"The Sacred Beast's Ambush (M22)"
23.	"Signs of Revival (M23)"
24.	"The Giant Cocoon (M24)"
25.	"God of the Sea: Mothra (M25)"
26.	"Unleashed Spirits of the War Dead (M26)"
27.	"Attack Preparation (M27)"
28.	"A Tense Moment (M28)"
29.	"God of the Sky: King Ghidorah (M29)"
30.	"GMK (M30)"
31.	"D-03 Missile Salvo (M31)"
32.	"Godzilla's Rage (M32)"
33.	"Determined to Protect the Future (M33)"
34.	"Mysterious Power (M34)"
35.	"The Miracle of the Three Sacred Beasts (M35)"
36.	"A Desperate Crisis (M36)"
37.	"Escape from Godzilla (M37)"
38.	"A Salute to the Spirits of the War Dead (M38)"
39.	"End Roll: Godzilla Theme - Great Monster War March - Main Title (M-End)"
Total length:		75:48

Bonus tracks

No.	Title	Length
1.	"The Giant Foot (M10 Edit)"
2.	"God of the Earth: Baragon (M17 Edit)"
3.	"The Forgotten Horror (M20 Edit)"
4.	"The Forgotten Horror (M20A Edit)"
5.	"Confrontation of the Two Giant Monsters (M21 Edit)"
6.	"The Sacred Beast's Ambush (M22)"
7.	"God of the Sky: King Ghidorah (M29)"
8.	"GMK (M30)"
9.	"God of the Sky: King Ghidorah (M34A)"
10.	"Demo I"
11.	"Demo II"
12.	"Demo III"
