= Tomoe Shinohara =

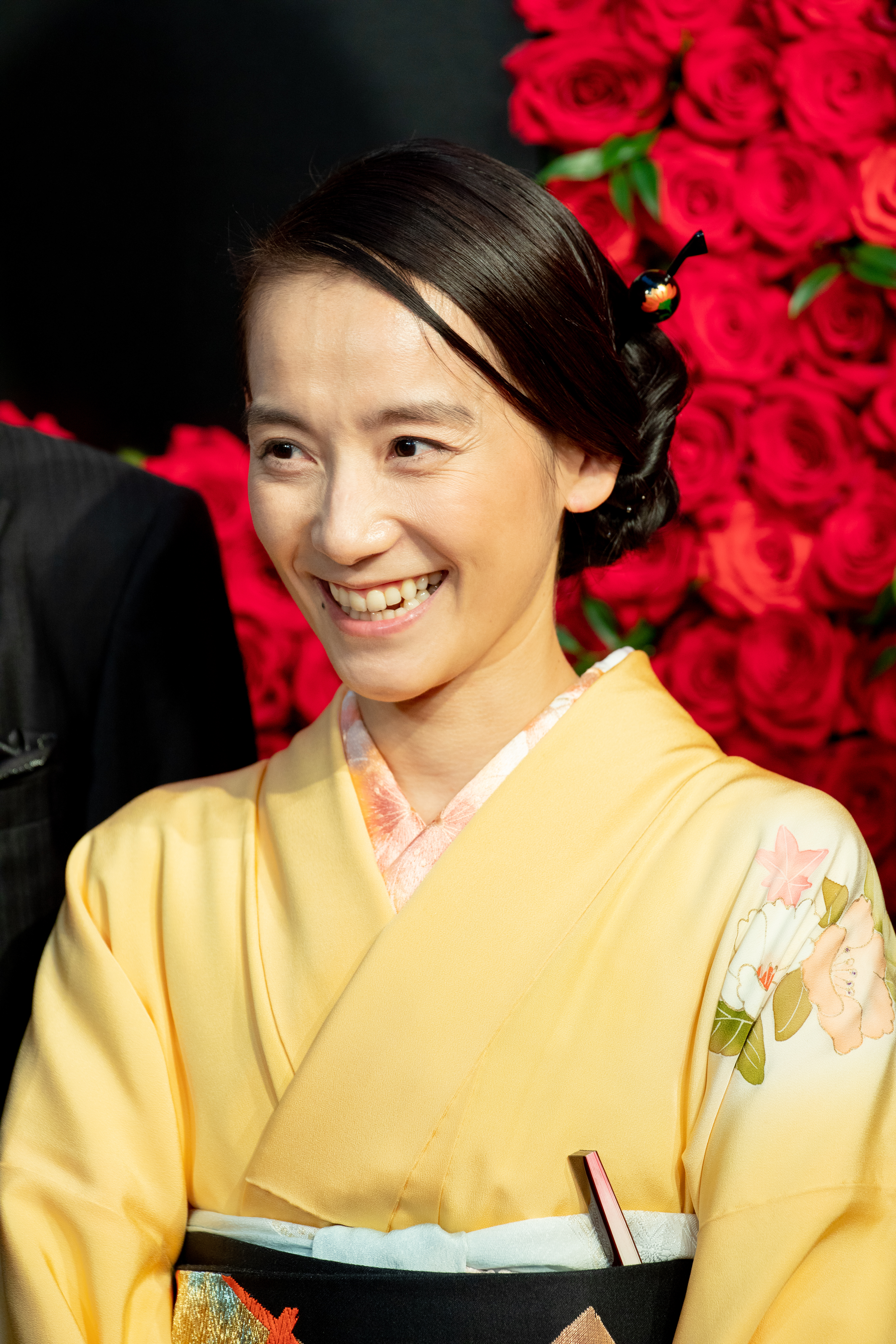
- Shinohara in 2018

Background information
- Born: March 29, 1979 (age 47)
- Origin: Higashimurayama City, Japan
- Genres: Pop, dance, experimental
- Occupations: Singer, actress, fashion designer, record producer, artist
- Years active: 1995–present
- Labels: Ki/oon, Jagged Apple, Dream Machine / Warner Music Japan

Tomoe Shinohara (篠原ともえ, Shinohara Tomoe; born March 29, 1979 in Higashimurayama, Tokyo) is a Japanese singer, actress, fashion designer, producer and artist. She is notable for her flamboyant fashion sense and bubbly (sometimes goofballish) personality, as well as her distinctive squealing speaking voice. She is also a close friend of singer Eiko Matsumoto.

== Career ==
In October 1996, Shinohara began as a regular hostess on the FujiTV music variety show "LOVE LOVE Aishiteru". In addition to her co-hostess duties she had her own segments called "PuriPuriPretty". In these segments she interviewed such international celebrities as Tim Burton and Enrique Iglesias.

In the West, Tomoe Shinohara is perhaps best known in the anime world for contributing the single "Ultra Relax" as the second opening theme song for the series Kodomo no Omocha, though this single is a small footnote to a larger body of musical work. Aside from music, she has taken parts in several films, dorama, commercials, and TV programs. She is a regular cast member on the children's TV series Monsterdio, from which five albums of cast recordings were released in 2005 and 2006.

Shinohara has also had some experience as an anime voice actor. In 2002, she voiced Hotaru-chan in Ghiblies Episode 2.

In 2005 she formed a music, dance and performance group called PANIKARAQS (which means "Water Ballet" in Urdu) with Yuka Honda (formerly of Cibo Matto), Steve Eto, and Chikage. Focusing on live performance, they have not released any CDs to date. However, in 2005, Shinohara released a solo CD single, "asoFever 2005", which served as the sixth Ending Theme for the anime Zatch Bell!.

Shinohara has had at least one song appearance on the NHK program Minna no Uta.

In a 2005 press conference in France, Tomoe (as she likes to be referred to) expressed a dream to perform with Daft Punk.

== Fashion ==
The characteristics of Shinora fashion are straight, choppy bangs, layered clothing that features bright, primary colors (similar to the UK-inspired fashion trend Super Lovers), shorts and suspenders, crumpled socks paired with hard shoes (similar to Doc Martens), strange make-up, glittery dollar store accessories, toy bracelets and rings, wristwatches, arm patches like the ones sold at carnival booths, pockets crammed with toys, goggles, and knapsacks.

Her style was a major impact on the Decora fashion, which revolves around bright colors and a large collection of accessories. The style has become a face of Harajuku fashion internationally.

== Music ==
=== Albums ===
- スーパー・モデル (Supermodel) (1996)
- MEGAPHONE SPEAKS (1998)
- DREAM&MACHINE (1999)
- DEEP SOUND CHANNEL (1999)
- VIRGIN DRINKS REMIX (2001)
- Supermodel 15th Anniversary Edition (2010)
- -:*Better*:- (2012)
- -:*Oh Yes Say Lala*:- (2012)
- Tomoe Shinohara ☆ALL TIME BEST☆ (2017)

=== Singles ===
- チャイム (Chime) (1995)
- やる気センセーション (Yaruki Sensation) (1996)
- クルクル ミラクル (Kurukuru Miracle) (1996)
- ウルトラリラックス (Ultra Relax) (1997)
- まるもうけ (Marumouke) (1997) as Shinoland Punk
- ココロノウサギ (Kokoro no Usagi) (1997)
- 君んち。 (Kiminchi.) (1999)
- HAPPY POINT (2000)
- an Audio (2000)
- I wanna say to... (2000) as Tomoé
- 遊FEVER 2005 (asoFever 2005) (2005) – "Konjiki no Gashbell" Ending theme.
- Sakura no Sakumade (2011)

== Units ==
- カロゴンズのテーマ (Karogons no Tema) by Yusuke Santamaria + Tomoe Shinohara (1998)
- カロゴンズのラヴソング (Karogons no Lovesong) by Yusuke Santamaria + Tomoe Shinohara (1998)
- キャラだもん (Kyaradamon) by Ryudo Uzaki + Tomoe Shinohara (2001)
- 明日に続く空 (Ashita ni tsuzuku sora) by Eiko Matsumoto + Tomoe Shinohara (known as ZuTTO)(2004)
- MOLMOTT + S by Molmott + Tomoe Shinohara (2004)
- MOLMOTT + S by Molmott + Tomoe Shinohara (2004)
- おんなのこ☆おとこのこ (Onna no ko ☆ Otoko no ko) by Tomoe Shinohara + Vanilla Beans (known as ShinoVani) (2016)

== Drama ==
- FiVE (1997)
- 先生 知らないの? (Sensei Shiranai no?) (1998)
- Konya wa Eigyōchu (1998)
- 夜逃げ屋本舗 (Yonigeya-honpo) (1999)
- バーチャルガール (Virtual Girl) (2000)
- Koi Suru Nichiyōbi (2004)

== Films ==
- デボラがライバル (Deborah ga Raibaru/Deborah, the Rival) (1997)
- Himitsu (1999)
- Godzilla, Mothra and King Ghidorah: Giant Monsters All-Out Attack (2001)
- Ghiblies Episode 2 (voice) (2002)
- Koi ni Utaeba (2002)
- Godzilla: Final Wars (Gojira: Fainaru Uôzu) (2004)
- Irasshaimase Kanja-sama (2005)
- Chorus-tai: Kanojotachi no Kiseki (2007)
- Yamagata Scream (2009)
- Exhalation (Sakerareru Koto) (2010)
- Stray Cat Girl (Neko to Densha) (2012)
- Princess Jellyfish (2014)

== Theatre ==
- TENSHI KARA NO SHOUTAIJOU (2000, including original music and costume design)
- ARIGATOU SABOTEN SENSEI (2002)
- GEKKOU NO TSUTSUSHIMI (2002)
- Blood Brothers (musical) (2003) – Linda
- FAUST (2004)
- PIPPI (2004, 2006)
- SPOOKY HOUSE (2004)
- BIGGEST BIZ (2006)
- JAIL BREAKERS (2006)
- THREEPENNY OPERA (2007)
