= Godzilla, Mothra and King Ghidorah: Giant Monsters All-Out Attack =

2001 film by Shusuke Kaneko

- Theatrical release poster

Japanese name
- Katakana: ゴジラ・モスラ・キングギドラ 大怪獣総攻撃
Transcriptions
- Revised Hepburn: Gojira, Mosura, Kingu Gidora: Daikaijū Sōkōgeki
- Directed by: Shusuke Kaneko
- Written by: Keiichi Hasegawa; Masahiro Yokotani; Shusuke Kaneko
- Produced by: Hideyuki Honma
- Starring: Chiharu Niiyama; Ryudo Uzaki; Masahiro Kobayashi; Shiro Sano; Hideyo Amamoto
- Cinematography: Masahiro Kishimoto
- Edited by: Isao Tomita
- Music by: Kow Otani
- Production company: Toho Pictures
- Distributed by: Toho
- Release dates: November 3, 2001 (Tokyo); December 15, 2001 (Japan)
- Running time: 105 minutes
- Country: Japan
- Language: Japanese
- Budget: ¥1.1 billion ($9 million)
- Box office: ¥2.71 billion (>$20 million)

Godzilla, Mothra and King Ghidorah: Giant Monsters All-Out Attack (Note: ゴジラ・モスラ・キングギドラ 大怪獣総攻撃, Gojira, Mosura, Kingu Gidora: Daikaijū Sōkōgeki) (often abbreviated as GMK) (Note: Attributed to multiple references:) is a 2001 Japanese kaiju film directed and co-written by Shusuke Kaneko. The 26th film in the Godzilla franchise and the third of the Millennium era, it serves as a direct sequel to Godzilla (1954) and shares a standalone continuity with the 1998 American film, ignoring the events of every other installment in the series. Chiharu Niiyama stars as a reporter covering the story of Baragon, Mothra, and King Ghidorah defending Japan from Godzilla, an onryō creature possessed by the souls of those killed during the Pacific War. The supporting cast includes Ryudo Uzaki, Masahiro Kobayashi, Shiro Sano, and Hideyo Amamoto, with Mizuho Yoshida as Godzilla, Akira Ohashi as Ghidorah, and Rie Ota as Baragon.

Kaneko first pitched the idea of directing a Godzilla film to executive producer Shogo Tomiyama in 1991. Following the success of his Gamera trilogy (1995–1999) and Pyrokinesis (2000), Tomiyama and Toho offered Kaneko the project in June 2000 with an unusual degree of creative freedom. He developed a story in which Godzilla battles three elemental guardians. At Toho's request, Varan and Anguirus were replaced with the more marketable Mothra and King Ghidorah, leaving only Baragon from the original trio. Development was nearly canceled after Godzilla vs. Megaguirus (2000) underperformed at the box office, but Tomiyama persuaded Toho to proceed. Principal photography took place from May to August 2001 on a ¥1.1 billion ($9 million) budget. Although Kaneko had hoped to direct the special effects (tokusatsu) himself as well, scheduling conflicts led to Makoto Kamiya helming them instead. Kow Otani composed the score, blending orchestral and electronic elements.

Godzilla, Mothra and King Ghidorah premiered in incomplete form at the Tokyo International Film Festival on November 3, 2001. Toho released the completed film throughout Japan on December 15, as a double feature with Hamtaro: Adventures in Ham-Ham Land. The double bill earned ¥2.71 billion (over $20 million), tying for the third-highest-grossing Japanese film during 2002. Godzilla, Mothra and King Ghidorah received generally positive reviews from critics and is widely regarded as one of the best entries in the Godzilla franchise and ultimately the most critically and commercially successful film in the Millennium series. Critics initially praised its direction, characters, and special effects, but were divided on the darker tone, monster reimaginings, and third act. Its performance ensured the franchise's continuation, leading to Masaaki Tezuka's Godzilla Against Mechagodzilla (2002), set in a different continuity.

== Plot ==
In 2002, during a Japan Self-Defense Forces (JSDF) briefing for cadets regarding the first Godzilla's attack and death in 1954, (Note: As depicted in its 1954 self-titled film.) Admiral Taizō Tachibana warns the trainees to remain vigilant. He notes that reports of monster sightings are increasing worldwide, including a similar monster that recently attacked New York City. (Note: As depicted in its 1998 self-titled film.) Tachibana is then alerted that an American nuclear submarine has gone missing off Guam. Search-and-rescue units find the submarine destroyed and capture footage of an undead Godzilla's dorsal plates moving in the vicinity.

Meanwhile, Tachibana's daughter Yuri, a reporter working for the pseudo-documentary television company BS Digital Q, is filming with her crew at Mount Myōkō when an earthquake strikes. That night, another earthquake buries a group of bōsōzoku bikers who had vandalized a roadside shrine; the lone surviving trucker witnesses the subterranean monster Baragon emerge. The next day, Yuri's colleague, Mitsuaki Takeda, supports her theory that a monster may have caused the mysterious earthquakes and gives her a book about Japan's legendary Guardian Monsters: Baragon (God of the Earth), Mothra (God of the Sea), and King Ghidorah (God of the Sky).

At Lake Ikeda, Mothra, in her larval form, attacks a group of teenage vandals who disturbed her shrine and spins a cocoon. Yuri interviews Professor Hirotoshi Isayama, a mysterious elder arrested by Motosu police for destroying a shrine. Unbeknownst to the authorities and Yuri's team, Isayama authored the Guardian Monsters book. He warns that the guardians must be awakened to prevent Godzilla from destroying Japan. Yuri and her colleagues visit the Guardian Monsters' shrine, where she finds a stone, then returns to continue interviewing Isayama. In the process, she discovers that the vengeful souls of soldiers and civilians who were killed during the Pacific War are embedded within Godzilla and are lashing out due to modern Japan's denial of its past crimes. Elsewhere, in Aokigahara, a suicidal man accidentally discovers a frozen, 1,000-year-old dragon, Ghidorah.

Godzilla surfaces in Yaizu and battles Baragon in Hakone, killing the smaller guardian. Yuri is injured during the fray and goes on her own after Takeda refuses to take her to Godzilla's location. When the JSDF's jets fail to stop Godzilla's course toward Tokyo, Tachibana sets up a defensive line in Yokohama. As Mothra emerges from her cocoon in her imago form, Isayama awakens Ghidorah to combat Godzilla. However, Godzilla overpowers both guardians and attempts to attack the JSDF soldiers. Mothra sacrifices herself, transferring her spirit to Ghidorah. The empowered dragon injures and drags Godzilla underwater. Amidst this, Tachibana and his colleague Yutaka Hirose board miniature Satsuma submarines to launch D-03 missiles into Godzilla's wound.

As the battle continues, the Yokohama Bay Bridge collapses under Godzilla's atomic breath while Yuri and Takeda are reporting from it. A shrine stone falls from Takeda's pocket and revives the injured Ghidorah, who saves Yuri and Takeda from their fall, and they swim ashore while the monsters continue to fight. Godzilla defeats Ghidorah, but the combined spirits of the Guardian Monsters pull Godzilla deep beneath the sea. Tachibana enters the creature through its mouth and fires a final D-03 missile from the inside. Godzilla resurfaces and attempts to kill Yuri and Takeda with its atomic breath, but the ray erupts through the shoulder wound instead, building pressure within Godzilla. Tachibana escapes as Godzilla sinks and explodes.

As Japan rejoices in victory, Yuri's colleagues discover all traces of Isayama have vanished from their recordings and that he had disappeared, presumed dead, during the 1954 Godzilla attack at age 75. Meanwhile, Yuri reunites with Tachibana, who salutes his colleagues and the Guardian Monsters. On the ocean floor, Godzilla's disembodied heart continues to beat.

== Cast ==
- Chiharu Niiyama as Yuri Tachibana, a reporter for BS Digital Q
- Ryudo Uzaki as Taizō Tachibana, an admiral of the Japan Self-Defense Forces (JSDF) and Yuri's father
  - Mikisuke Haruyama as five-year-old Taizō
- Masahiro Kobayashi as Mitsuaki Takeda, a novelist and Yuri's colleague
- Shiro Sano as Haruki Kadokura, the manager of BS Digital Q
- Hideyo Amamoto as Hirotoshi Isayama, a ghostly elder who authored the book Biographies of the National Guardian Monsters (Note: 護国聖獣伝記, Gokoku Seijū Denki)
- Takashi Nishina as Jun Maruo, an assistant director at BS Digital Q
- Kaho Minami as Kumi Emori, a colonel of the JSDF's Information Management Department
- Shinya Owada as Katsumasa Mikumo, a lieutenant general of the JSDF
- Kunio Murai as Masato Hinogaki, a secretary of the JSDF
- Hiroyuki Watanabe as Yutaka Hirose, a commander of the JSDF
- Shingo Katsurayama as Tokihiko Kobayakawa, a major of the JSDF
- Takeo Nakahara as Sakita, the captain of the cruiser Aizu
- Toshikazu Fukawa as Adjutant Miyashita, a lieutenant colonel of the JSDF onboard the Aizu
- Masahiko Tsugawa as the Chief Cabinet Secretary
- Mizuho Yoshida as Godzilla, an undead dinosaurian creature possessed by the spirits of the people killed during the Pacific War
  - Yoshida also makes a cameo as a man watching Mothra flying overhead
- Akira Ohashi as King Ghidorah, a 1,000-year-old ancient three-headed dragon and one of Japan's Guardian Monsters. It is an immature form of Yamata no Orochi, defeated and frozen by humans long ago, reducing it to three heads.
  - Ohashi also makes a cameo as a Yaizu Fisheries clerk
- Rie Ota as Baragon, a subterranean dinosaurian creature and one of Japan's Guardian Monsters
  - Ota also makes a cameo as a Yaizu Fisheries office worker

The film also features Yukijiro Hotaru as a suicidal businessman who accidentally discovers Ghidorah; Nobuaki Kakuda as the commander of the Yokohama Garrison; Moro Morooka as the director of BS Digital Q; Houka Kinoshita as the biker gang leader; Koichi Ueda as a village mayor; Takashi Sasano as the trembling truck driver; Yu Tokui as the director of the news helicopter; Kaoru Mizuki as the lady at the supermarket who does not believe Godzilla exists; Kazuko Kato as a school teacher who witnesses the mushroom cloud caused by Godzilla's atomic breath; Tarō Ishida as a JSDF officer; Kyōsuke Ikeda as a boy at Iriuda Hospital; Shogo Yamaguchi as a university student at Lake Ikeda; and Masaya Takahashi as a bicycle shop owner. Appearing onscreen together were Katsuo Nakamura and Ryo Kase as Yaizu fishermen and Yoshimasa Kondo and Kaoru Okunuki as a couple at Ōwakudani.

Guest appearances include Tomoe Shinohara as an innkeeper attacked by Godzilla twice; Koichi Yamadera as a television producer; Hinako Saeki as a woman on a ropeway; Takashi Matsuo as a police officer; Kenji Mizuhashi as a JSDF soldier; Jiro Sato as a JSDF officer; Yoichi Nukumizu as a man urinating at the inn; and Xie Zhaoren as a Chinatown resident. Director Shusuke Kaneko's wife, Nanako, also appears as a meteorological observer.

Cameos include Ai and Aki Maeda as twin sisters watching Mothra flying over Kagoshima (paying homage to the monster's twin priestesses); Godzilla 2000 (1999) star Takehiro Murata as a pilot; and Kōichi Kawakita, the special effects director for the Heisei era's Godzilla films, and Godzilla vs Megaguirus (2000) director Masaaki Tezuka, making uncredited cameos as a JASDF officer and a JSDF officer, respectively.

== Production ==
=== Development ===
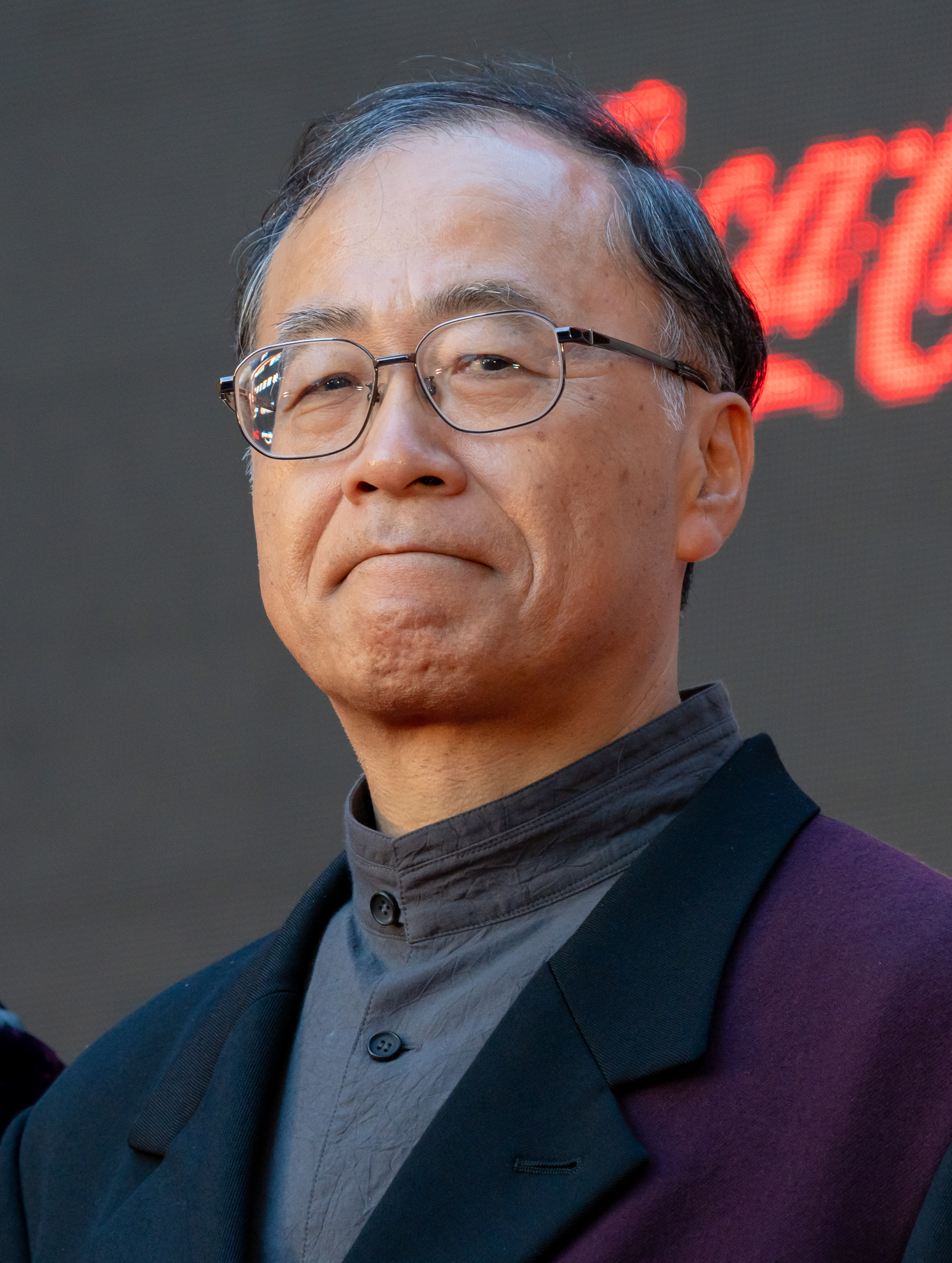
Shusuke Kaneko, seen in 2023, directed and co-wrote the film

Emerging filmmaker Shusuke Kaneko had long desired to direct a Godzilla film. (Note: Kaneko grew up watching Godzilla films, but his enthusiasm for the franchise faded over time. His interest was rekindled in 1984 while he was at Nikkatsu making his directorial debut on the porn film Kōichirō Uno's Wet and Swinging. The release of The Return of Godzilla that year, helmed by another new director, motivated Kaneko and left him with a sense of rivalry towards its director. He subsequently followed the revived Heisei series closely, aspiring to direct his own entry in the franchise and rival or surpass the work of its directors with his own films.) He first contacted Toho's Godzilla executive producer Shogo Tomiyama in December 1991 with a New Year's postcard, shortly after Godzilla vs. King Ghidorah (1991) opened and Toho announced plans for the next entry. However, Takao Okawara had already been selected, and the project became Godzilla vs. Mothra (1992). Kaneko continued approaching Tomiyama for subsequent films but was repeatedly too late, as another director was usually already attached. Tomiyama nevertheless kept him in mind.

In the meantime, Kaneko directed the critically acclaimed Heisei Gamera trilogy (1995–1999), which impressed Tomiyama. While Godzilla 2000 (1999) was in production, Tomiyama decided to give Kaneko the third film in the new Millennium series. To assess whether Kaneko could adapt to Toho's studio system, Tomiyama first assigned him Pyrokinesis (2000) without revealing the true motive.

During the wrap party for Pyrokinesis in April 2000, Kaneko was informed that Toho was considering him to direct the next Godzilla film. On June 14, a few days after Pyrokinesis opened, Tomiyama, producer Hideyuki Honma, and other Toho executives formally offered Kaneko the job. At the time, the film was planned as the final entry in the Millennium era. Toho granted him an unusual level of creative freedom for the franchise: rather than receiving a producer-driven concept, Kaneko was allowed to develop the project from his own ideas and personally select his key collaborators. This gave him what was reportedly the greatest degree of directorial control over a Godzilla film since the Shōwa era (1954–1975).

Kaneko's Godzilla film was originally scheduled to be formally revealed on December 16, 2000—the release date of the second Millennium film, Godzilla vs. Megaguirus—but the announcement was cancelled at the last minute. Kaneko confidentially told reporter Norman England that Toho would proceed only if Megaguirus performed well at the box office. When the film underperformed, grossing ¥1.2 billion against a ¥700–950 million budget, Toho executives moved to cancel Kaneko's project and end the franchise. Tomiyama successfully defended it, pointing out that development was already well underway and expressing confidence that Kaneko could deliver both a critical and commercial success.

Western media first reported Kaneko as director of a new Godzilla film in mid-January 2001. In February, the studio confirmed a new film was in development, without naming the director. The official production announcement was held on March 6 at Toho's headquarters, unveiling Kaneko as director, the film's title, story details, release date, and a Godzilla maquette based on Kaneko's design. Both Kaneko and Tomiyama attended the press conference.

=== Conception ===
It was the right decision economically [to change the monsters] for selling tickets [...] As a director, that is my job to think about. But still, in the bottom of my heart, in a very small corner, I still have the feeling that Varan, Baragon, and Anguirus [...] could have been better.

— Shusuke Kaneko on changing the title monsters for the film

While attempting to devise the film's story, Kaneko cycled through various concepts. At first, he suggested pitting Godzilla against Kamacuras, his son's favorite kaiju, but, according to Kaneko, this was scrapped because Kamacuras was considered "too obscure" and Godzilla had fought a similar insectoid kaiju in the previous entry. (Note: Attributed to multiple references:)

Next, Kaneko proposed featuring Godzilla confronting a new monster called "M", an astronaut mutated by cosmic rays. He compared the character to Jamila, a monster from Ultraman (TV 1966). The concept adopted a darker, more militaristic tone, replacing the Japan Self-Defense Forces with a force reflecting Japan's post-war history, and included a tragic ending in which Yumi sacrifices herself to revive her father, who had become the monster "M". Toho executives firmly rejected the idea, deeming its darker tone to be unsuitable for a New Year's holiday release. However, elements like the emphasis on a father-daughter dynamic were retained in the final story.

Kaneko then envisioned Godzilla battling three divine guardian monsters of Japan: Anguirus, Baragon, and Varan. The working title was Godzilla x Varan, Baragon and Anguirus: Giant Monsters All-Out Attack. (Note: ゴジラ×バラン・バラゴン・アンギラス 大怪獣総攻撃, Gojira x Baran, Baragon, Angirasu: Daikaijū Sōkōgeki) The project received Toho's approval and entered development for several months. In this version, the three kaiju were reimagined as embodiments of the Earth's elements, with Anguirus possessing ice and freezing abilities, Baragon having geothermal energy or fire, and Varan linked to wind through its flight capability.

During a meeting sometime before October 2000, Toho chairman Isao Matsuoka instructed Kaneko to substitute two of the monsters with the more marketable Mothra and King Ghidorah, describing the original trio as "on the small side". Toho's decision was influenced by market considerations, including recent research indicating that Mothra appealed strongly to female audiences while King Ghidorah drew male viewers. After silently considering the suggestion for 15 minutes in their office, Kaneko concluded that he could meet their requirements for this film despite his initial skepticism. He later explained that thinking of a recent reunion with former elementary school classmates, none of whom remembered Anguirus, Baragon, or Varan, had also reinforced his decision by showing how unfamiliar younger audiences had since become with those kaiju.

Although Anguirus was considered more recognizable, having appeared alongside Godzilla in several films, Tomiyama and screenwriter Masahiro Yokotani successfully argued for keeping Baragon, believing the monster would be more narratively suitable for an early defeat. Due to concerns over audience familiarity, Baragon was omitted from the film's title. Despite the changes, the overall structure remained the same, with Baragon fighting Godzilla first before the climactic battle in Yokohama.

=== Writing ===
Kaneko penned three drafts solo before enlisting tokusatsu (Japanese special effects) television series veteran Keiichi Hasegawa for assistance on a fourth; Hasegawa joined in August 2000. Pyrokinesis co-writer Masahiro Yokotani was subsequently brought in, having had discussions with Kaneko about the project since May 21. The fifth screenplay was largely completed by January 2001. The screenwriters ultimately completed the film's script on April 20, 2001. Early on, the writers decided to give Godzilla the destructive antagonist role, attempting to replace the role King Ghidorah had played in its debut film Ghidorah, the Three-Headed Monster (1964). They gradually revised Godzilla's backstory to become more mystical, though its fundamental character as a mutant dinosaur born from the atomic bomb remained.

Kaneko conceived the story as taking place in an alternate history where Japan, fully autonomous after World War II, signed a simple friendship treaty with the United States instead of the real-world Security Treaty. In-universe, the nation is called the Japanese Democratic Republic, with no restrictions on its Self-Defense Forces, allowing it to defend against threats such as Godzilla without foreign aid. Kaneko explained: "If Godzilla attacks, this fantasy setup enables the country to fight. But in reality, we would be dependent on America [for help]." Early into the writing, the real JSDF refused to cooperate with the production after Kaneko proposed a scene depicting a jet fighter crashing and causing civilian casualties—a stark contrast to his earlier Gamera films, where the military had provided full support.

Godzilla, Mothra and King Ghidorah takes place in a shared universe with the 1998 American Godzilla film while functioning as a standalone story with no direct plot connection to it. References to the 1998 film appeared in Kaneko's earliest drafts. In the film, after Tachibana gives a briefing mentioning that a monster attacked New York recently, one officer notes that American experts identified it as Godzilla, while another expresses skepticism, stating that Japanese specialists do not believe the creature was the real Godzilla. According to Kaneko, he initially added the reference as a joke after learning of the American film's unpopularity. However, it ultimately also served a narrative purpose by reinforcing the idea that monsters exist worldwide and that countermeasures are necessary, thereby making the story's multiple kaiju appearances more plausible. In another account, he elaborated that the line was not purely comedic but was meant to suggest "a kind of a monster multiverse exists".

Early drafts included the submarine battleship Gotengo and large-scale Defense Force battles, but Tomiyama scaled these back to avoid overcrowding the narrative. Yokotani proposed entering Godzilla's mouth to defeat it, leading to the inclusion of the midget submarine Satsuma and the D-03 propelled jackhammer. An early abandoned scene featured Godzilla destroying a bullet train emerging from a mountain tunnel, cut due to miniature and location constraints. Kaneko also envisioned a scene in which Godzilla would destroy the controversial Yasukuni Shrine, but Toho rejected the idea, deeming it too inflammatory to include. Toho also requested removing the cruel dog torture scene at Lake Ikeda, in which the teenagers attempt to dump the dog in the middle of the lake right where Mothra is sleeping, but Kaneko insisted on keeping it as a warning against evildoing amid Japan's peace-loving self-image.

=== Pre-production ===
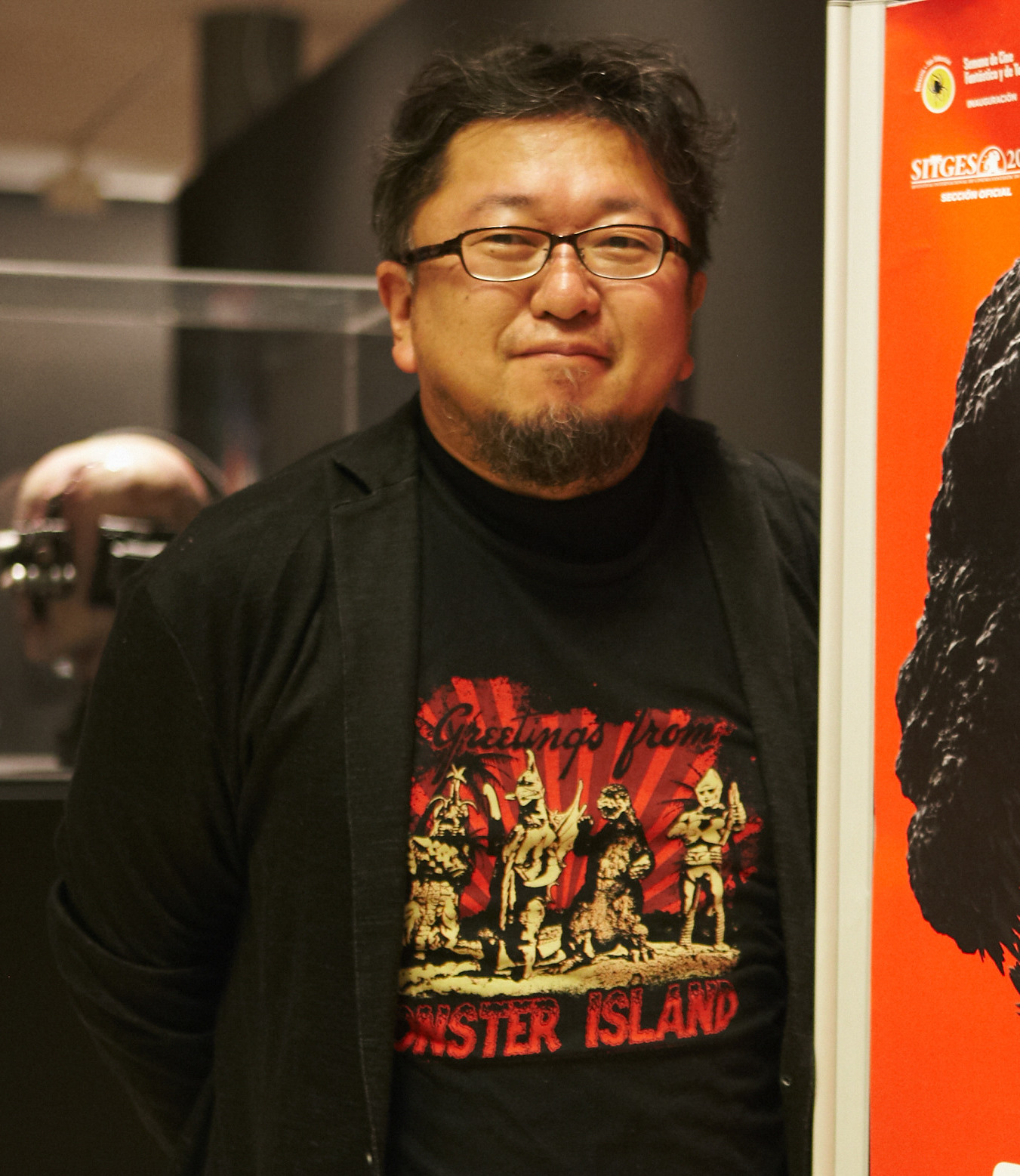
Shinji Higuchi (pictured in 2016) provided uncredited storyboards for the special effects during pre-production.

Kaneko received significant creative control over Godzilla, Mothra and King Ghidorah: Giant Monsters All-Out Attack, including choices for cast, crew, composer, and key team members. Anticipating his 2000 appointment by Toho, he had already discussed the project with suit creator Fuyuki Shinada. Kaneko assembled a team largely from his longtime collaborators on the Heisei Gamera trilogy and other films, preserving his signature style of tightly integrated live-action and effects work, while incorporating Toho's in-house contracted staff for certain roles. Toho also requested personnel to continue from Kaneko's prior film, Pyrokinesis. These included assistant directors and producer Hideyuki Honma, the latter appointed by executive producer Tomiyama to give staff members who had recently joined Toho's film planning department an opportunity to gain experience with tokusatsu films. (Note: At Toho during this era, the senior executive was credited as seisaku (製作; lit. 'Production'), the top role equivalent to executive producer. A separate "producer" (プロデューサー) credit was uncommon and usually indicated a supporting, day-to-day position. For Godzilla, Mothra and King Ghidorah, Tomiyama received the seisaku credit, while Honma was credited as producer.)

Kaneko sought a redesign of Godzilla that avoided what he perceived as the "cute" elements in the suits created by Shinichi Wakasa for the two preceding Millennium films. Thus, Kaneko instead commissioned Shinada to construct the Godzilla suit, aiming for a more traditional and menacing appearance. Kaneko then asked Wakasa to create the Baragon suit. Feeling slighted by not being chosen for Godzilla, Wakasa reportedly refused to work on any monster suits for the film unless he could handle Godzilla, straining his professional relationship with Kaneko.

Due to tight scheduling constraints, Kaneko could not direct both the live-action and special effects (tokusatsu) sequences as initially planned. As a result, another director was brought in to handle the tokusatsu portions of the film. Rather than selecting an established special effects director, Kaneko chose the relatively unknown Makoto Kamiya for the role. Although Kamiya had not previously directed special effects for a kaiju film, he had extensive experience as an assistant special effects director, having worked on Kaneko's Heisei Gamera trilogy under Shinji Higuchi and on several Godzilla films under Kōichi Kawakita.

To compensate for not directing the special effects sequences himself, Kaneko drew hundreds of detailed storyboards, which were printed as a supplement to the script. He emphasized drawing on his experience with the Gamera trilogy to ensure tight integration between the live-action and effects crews through precise communication and shared planning. The effects team, primarily staffed from the Heisei Gamera series and led by Kamiya, received uncredited storyboard support from Higuchi, along with contributions from Yuichi Kikuchi, Kenichi Eguchi, and Godzilla vs. Megaguirus director Masaaki Tezuka on SFX Team B. Seeking more spectacle, Kamiya obtained Kaneko's approval for Higuchi to revise storyboards for the Owakudani Godzilla–Baragon battle; as Kamiya noted, Kaneko's originals depicted mostly flat ground, but revisions incorporated dramatic terrain, with Baragon leaping from a cliff to attack Godzilla below.

=== Casting and characters ===
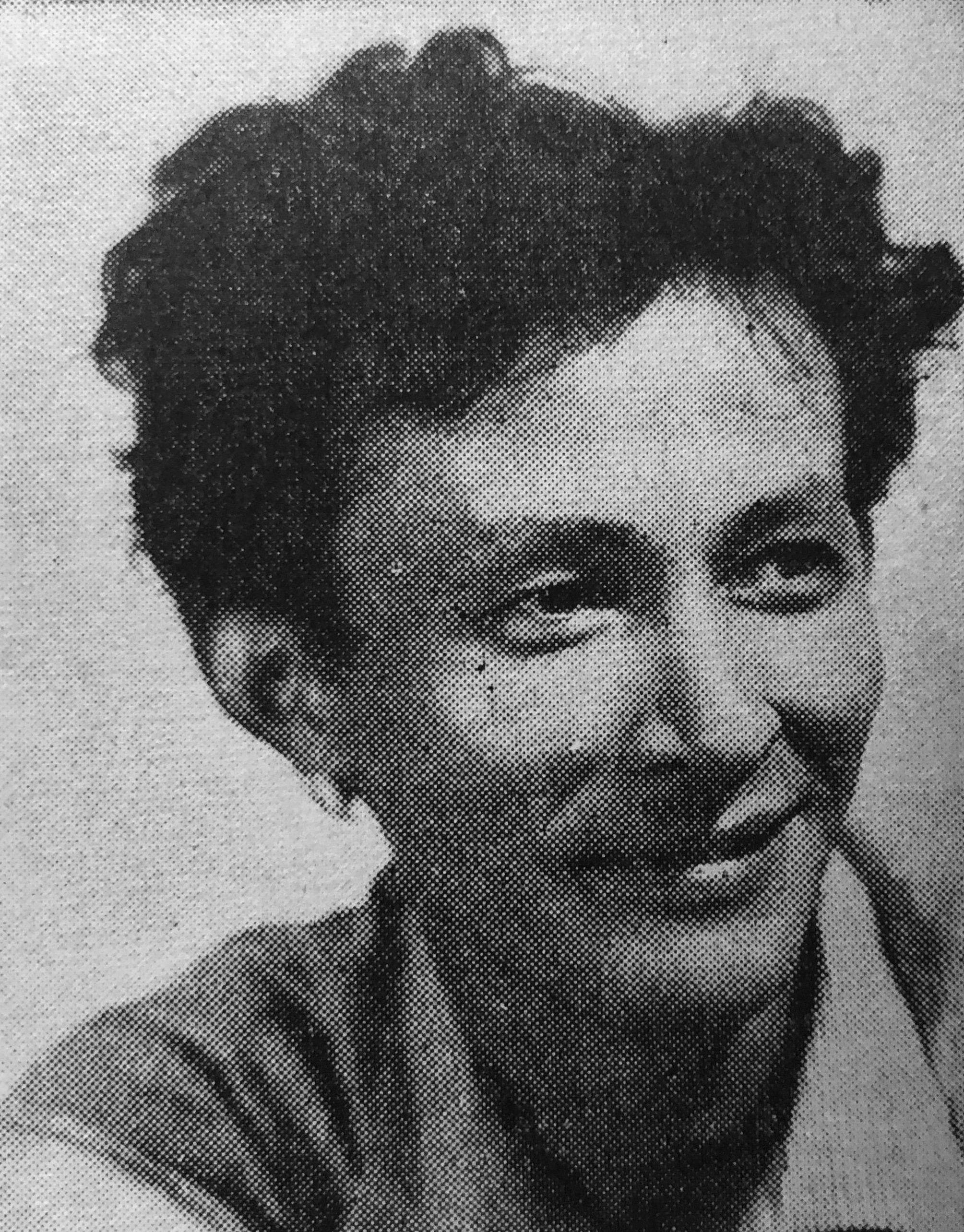
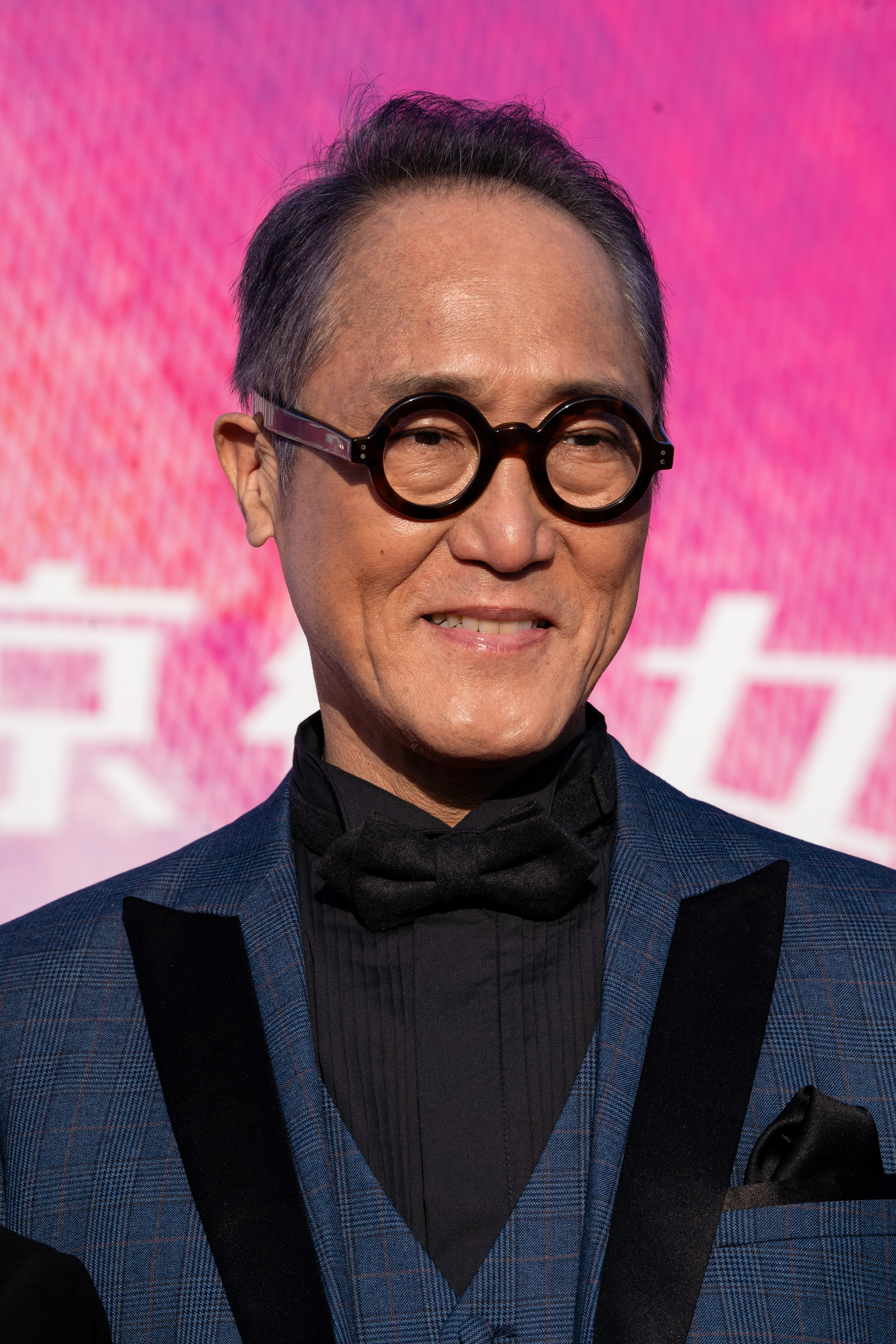
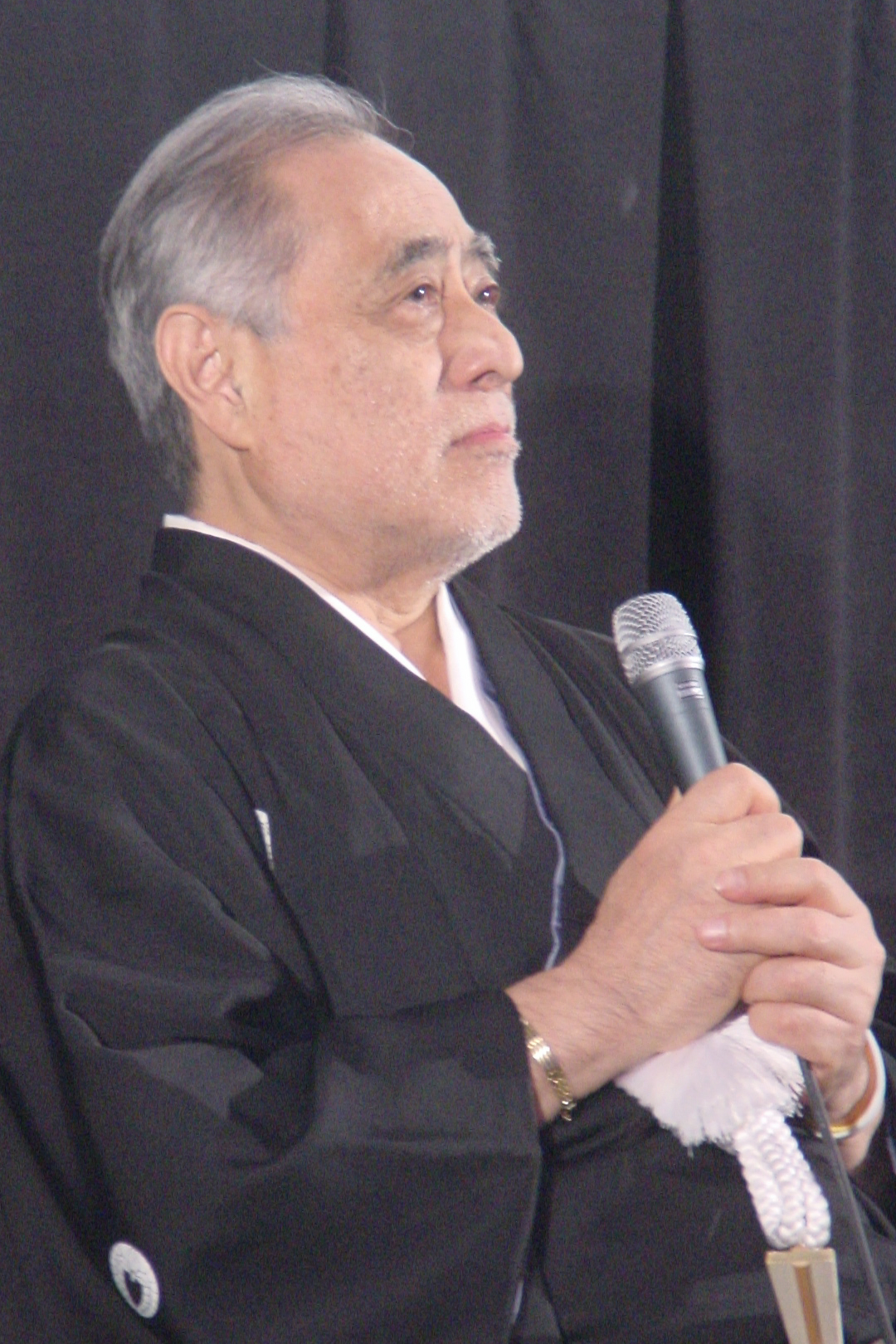
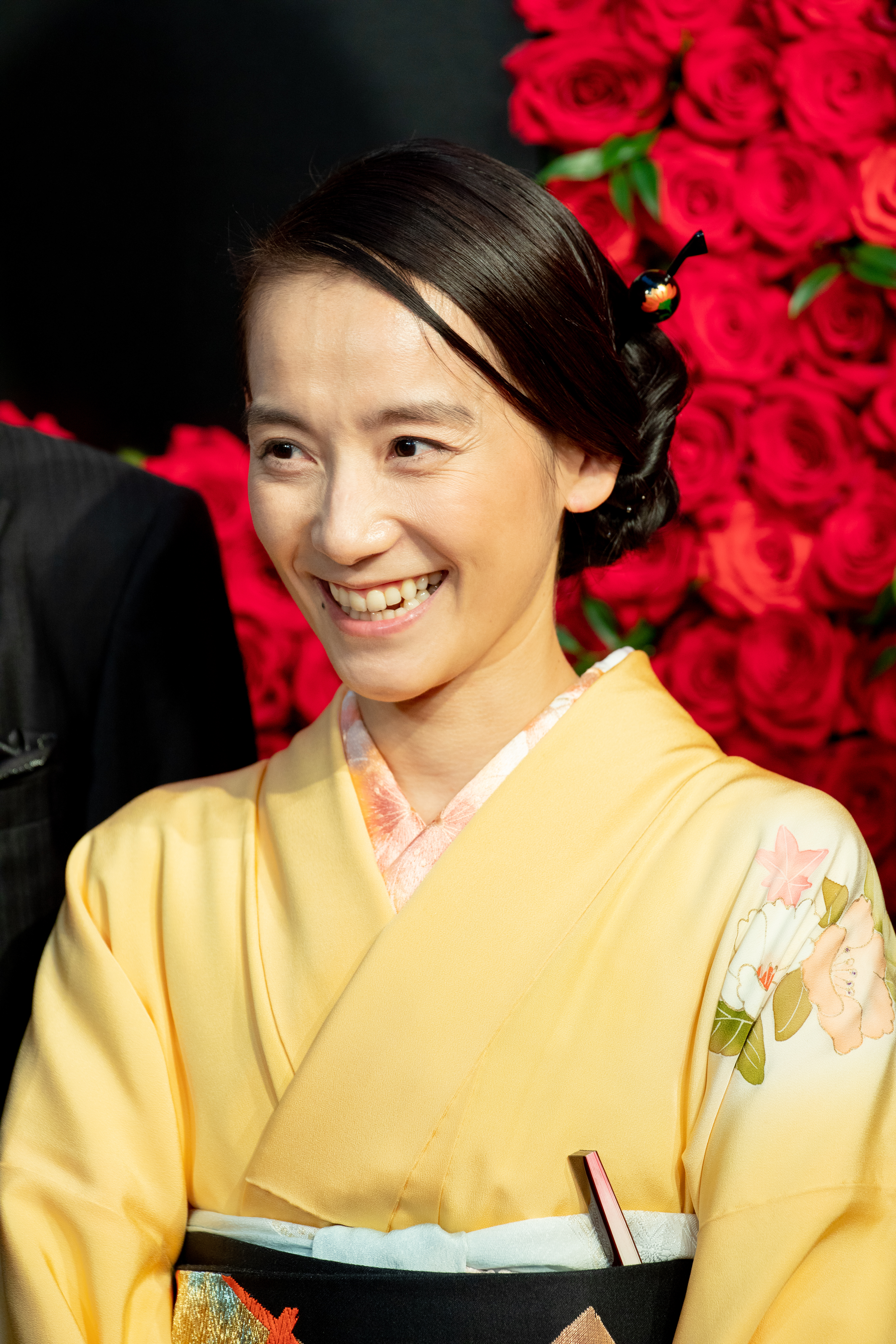
Left to right: Hideyo Amamoto (pictured in 1961), Shiro Sano (2024), Masahiko Tsugawa (2005), and Tomoe Shinohara (2018)

The film featured a mix of established Japanese actors and numerous cameo appearances. Chiharu Niiyama was cast in the leading role of investigative journalist Yuri Tachibana. Kaneko had followed Niiyama's career from her early roles in daytime dramas and sought to cast her as she moved from pop-idol work into more serious acting parts. Her casting was announced on May 5, 2001; at just 20 years old, Niiyama became the youngest actress ever to headline a Godzilla film, surpassing Misato Tanaka, who was 23 when she led the previous year's Godzilla vs. Megaguirus.

Kaneko named Yuri after his own daughter, Yurina, as well as the character Yuriko Edogawa from the 1966 kaiju series Ultra Q. The fictional television network where Yuri works, BS Digital Q, was itself a direct homage to Ultra Q. Similarly, her colleague Jun Maruo (played by Takashi Nishina) was named after the character Jun Manjome from the same series.

Yuri was initially envisioned by Kaneko as being a scripter, timekeeper, or assistant producer at BS Digital Q, with the story showing her growth from a young behind-the-scenes employee to a confident adult who takes on reporting herself. After discussing the idea with the film's scripter, he learned that specialized roles such as a scripter would probably not exist at a small company like BS Digital Q. Kaneko therefore revised the character to be a reporter from the start, believing it would be simpler and easier for audiences to understand.

Kaneko sought to address sexism in the Japanese TV industry through Yuri's experiences as a female reporter and her interactions with her boss. Kaneko later realized that making Yuri a reporter had unintentionally created parallels to Audrey Timmonds (played by Maria Pitillo), the aspiring young female reporter from the 1998 American Godzilla film who struggles in her job partly because of her gender. He described the coincidence as "a little embarrassing". Early drafts also featured Yuri's boss, Haruki Kadokura, sexually harassing her, but this was removed in the third draft. According to Kaneko, Shiro Sano based the eccentric character on a director he knew personally. Sano's memorable hair-fidgeting gesture was his own spontaneous ad-lib.

For the role of Admiral Taizō Tachibana, Yuri's father, Kaneko cast musician and non-professional actor Ryudo Uzaki. He deliberately chose Uzaki, whose atypical appearance did not fit the perceived traditional image of a military officer. This was in order to prevent the character's climactic self-sacrificial actions from carrying unintended right-wing or militaristic connotations. Masahiro Kobayashi played the role of science writer Mitsuaki Takeda; he said his favorite scene was the one in which Takeda takes a drunken Yuri to her father's house, praising Uzaki's performance in it as well. Kobayashi's character was inspired by his uncle, an architect and passionate UFO researcher.

Veteran actor Hideyo Amamoto returned to the Godzilla series after 33 years to play the mysterious elder Hirotoshi Isayama. Kaneko had envisioned Amamoto for the role of Isayama from the earliest stages of the script and was thrilled to work with him. The part marked Amamoto's fourth appearance in the Godzilla film series and ultimately his final major role.

Kaho Minami, who played Colonel Kumi Emori, took inspiration from Lee Young-ae's character, Major Sophie E. Jean, in the 2000 film Joint Security Area. Minami noted that the costumes she received were instrumental in helping her achieve a similar look. Her future husband, actor Ken Watanabe, later starred in Godzilla (2014); he expressed mock disappointment at being second in their household to be involved in a Godzilla production.

A distinctive aspect of the production was its extensive use of well-known actors and television personalities in brief, often single-scene roles or cameos. Notable examples include Masahiko Tsugawa as the Chief Cabinet Secretary, the sisters Ai and Aki Maeda (then represented by the same talent agency as Tsugawa), Takashi Sasano, Nobuaki Kakuda (cast as a unit commander after Toho production staff saw his enthusiastic discussion of Godzilla on the variety program Waratte Iitomo! during the "Telephone Shocking" segment), and Tomoe Shinohara (appearing as a guesthouse hostess at the invitation of co-star Uzaki, her then-bandmate in the musical group Shinoryu).

According to Tsugawa, to prepare for his role, he interviewed real former chief cabinet secretaries to consult on the appropriate style and delivery for an emergency government press conference.

=== Filming ===
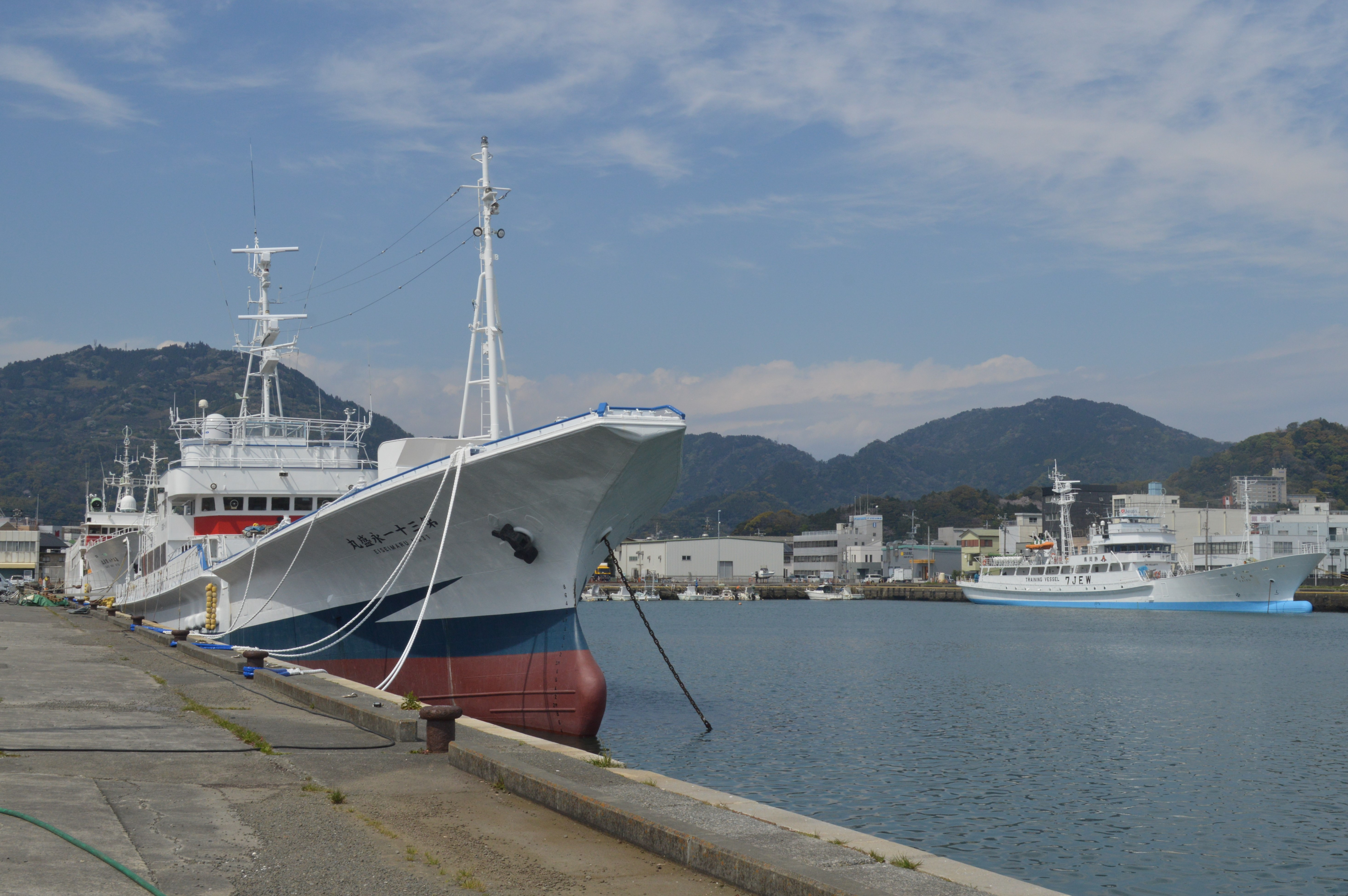
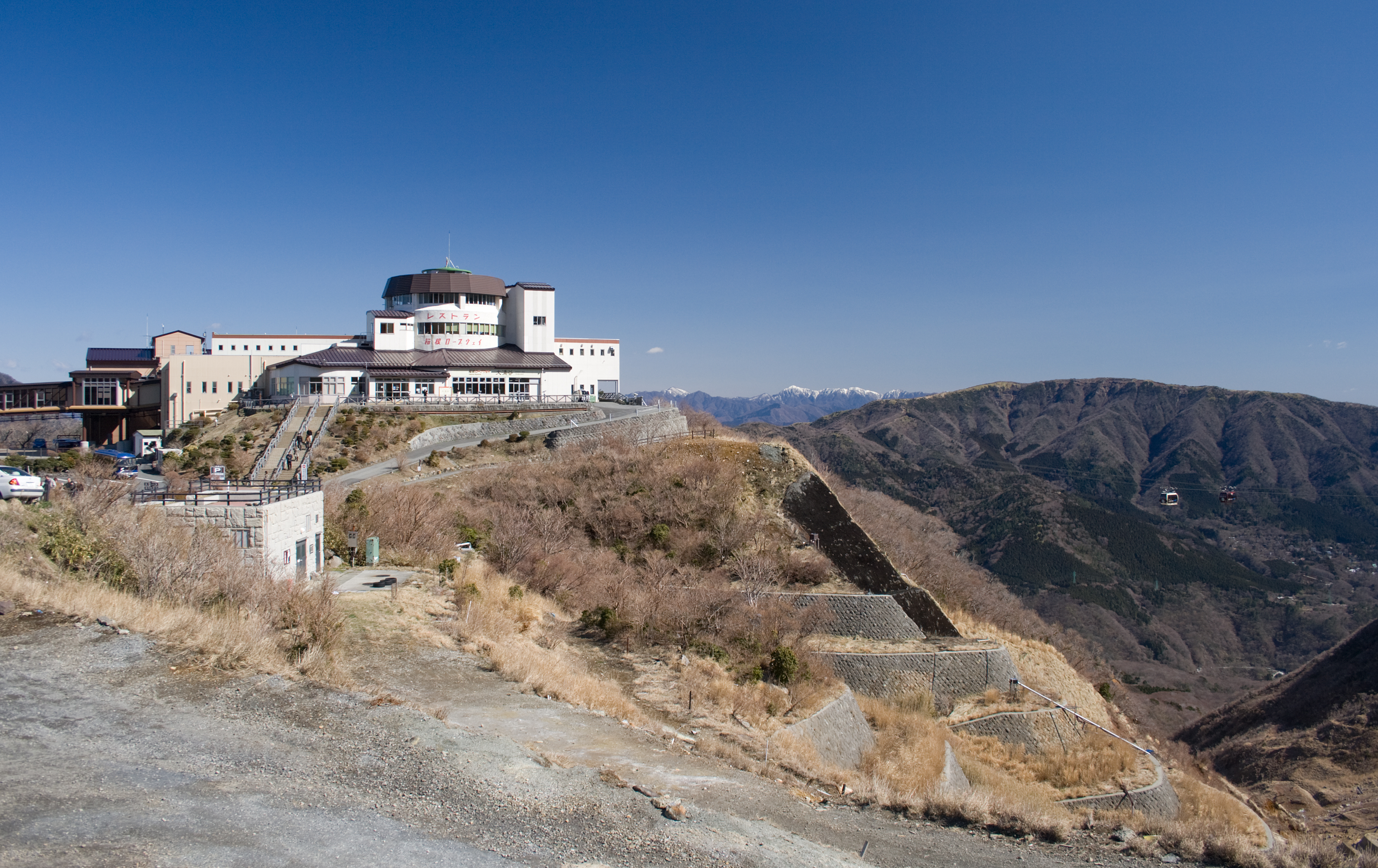
Location filming occurred at Yaizu's fishing port (pictured in 2020) and the original Ōwakudani Station in Hakone, Kanagawa (pictured in 2008).

Principal photography for Godzilla, Mothra and King Ghidorah began on May 8, 2001, on location at Lake Ikeda near Kagoshima. (Note: Attributed to multiple references:) Kaneko described the shoot as pre-main photography pick-ups. These consisted of a composite shot of Mothra's cocoon floating on the lake, featuring about 20 local extras and incorporating the regional folklore of the lake monster Issie reimagined as Mothra. Later that night, footage was filmed in Tenmonkan, Kagoshima, for a composite of Mothra flying overhead. A small crew of nine worked on location, with Masahiro Kishimoto serving as cinematographer. It was Kishimoto's fourth Godzilla film in the role.

Main filming, referred to as the "crank in" in the Japanese film industry, officially commenced on May 11, 2001, in Studio 1 at Toho Studios. (Note: Attributed to multiple references:) Production was handled by Toho's subsidiary Toho Pictures, which operated from the Toho Studios lot. The first two scenes filmed at Toho Studios were the encounters with the frozen King Ghidorah, for which a set was created to depict the interior of a cave; Hotaru's scene at the location was shot on the first day, with Amamoto's shot the following day. At the start of production, Kaneko noted the contrast with his earlier Gamera films, commenting that Toho's over-twice larger budget allowed for more elaborate built sets rather than heavy reliance on location work. GMK's budget was reported at ¥1.1 billion (approximately $9 million in 2001).

The minshuku guesthouse destruction sequence required careful coordination between the live-action and special effects units. Interior views through the windows were captured during principal photography on the main set and later composited with detailed miniature work. Only the window frame itself was physically constructed for the compositing process to ensure precise alignment. The full guesthouse set, erected on Studio 8 at Toho Studios, was lifted by a forklift equipped with springs beneath to simulate Godzilla's earth-shaking footsteps. When the set was dropped, ping-pong balls were placed on surfaces and bounced convincingly after being struck from below the floor with hammers by hidden crew members.

Several deliberate creative decisions paid tribute to the original 1954 Godzilla film during the guesthouse scenes. A photograph depicting the Odo Island research team from fifty years prior was produced using authentic still frames taken directly from the first movie. The harrowing sequence in which the minshuku innkeeper woman (played by Shinohara) is attacked by Godzilla, rescued, and then fatally attacked again mirrors the tragic fate of a fisherman on Odo Island in the 1954 film. In another scene paying homage to the 1954 film, Taizō's flashback to witnessing Godzilla's 1954 attack recreates the original film's scenes directed by Ishirō Honda, with extras in period costumes fleeing a faithfully recreated set—including the outdoor environment, cart, and police uniforms—and a poster for Honda's Farewell Rabaul (1954) visible in the background.

Yaizu's Fishing Port was specifically selected as the site for Godzilla's dramatic landing because of its historical significance. The port had served as the home base for the ill-fated Daigo Fukuryū Maru fishing vessel, which was exposed to nuclear fallout in 1954. Scenes showing the windows of the Yaizu local fishing cooperative shattering under pressure were executed safely on a purpose-built studio set. Although exterior shots utilized real locations such as S-Pulse Dream Plaza and Ogawa Fisheries Cooperative, the interiors failed to match director Kaneko's precise vision. As a result, additional interior footage was captured at the nearby Numazu Fish Market to better align with the intended aesthetic. The long establishing shot of Godzilla first emerging onto land was photographed from the vantage point of Kanpo no Yado Yaizu.

The Ōwakudani Station sequence demanded a blend of practical location work and miniature-effects photography; crew members transported additional debris to the actual site in Hakone to elevate the sense of destruction during filming. Hakone Ropeway cooperated fully with the production but explicitly requested that no footage depict passengers falling from the cable cars. On the first scheduled day of shooting at Ōwakudani, approximately 100 extras were assembled, but heavy rain and low cloud cover forced cancellation. The scene was filmed the next day during a brief window of sunshine, with Kaneko initially approving the take. However, he later demanded a retake, leading to a disagreement with Honma and Tomiyama. Kaneko ultimately prevailed and completed additional pick-up shots for it after principal photography had wrapped. The pivotal parking lot scene showing Baragon's fall was also initially captured on location in Hakone before being reshot at Toho Studios against a green screen, with the same extras present.

Several location scenes were filmed in the Tokyo and Kanagawa prefectures of the Kantō region. The Chief Cabinet Secretary's press conference scene was shot at the Nippon Seinenkan in Tokyo. Planned filming in Yokohama Chinatown was denied permission by local authorities; thus, those scenes were relocated to the Bell Road Tsurumi shopping district outside Tsurumi Station. Filming also took place at the Yokohama Bay Bridge, Keikyū Tsurumi Station, Torisawa Station, Sagamihara, and Lake Saiko (standing in for Lake Ikeda).

Live-action principal photography ended on July 26, 2001, though pick-up shots took place at a later date. Special effects photography, on the other hand, wrapped a day behind schedule on August 9, which was considered the official completion of photography or "crank up".

=== Post-production ===
Post-production lasted three months and was led by Hajime Matsumoto, who also served as the visual effects supervisor, with Toshihiro Ogawa producing. To streamline reviews and reduce travel for the director and staff, Matsumoto introduced a "check room" system at Toho Studios, where representatives from all post-production companies gathered in one room to evaluate progress together. Isao Tomita, who had previously collaborated with Kaneko on Gamera 3: Revenge of Iris (1999) and Pyrokinesis, served as the film's editor. During production, his health was in decline as he underwent chemotherapy for cancer, which caused him to lose his hair.

The film's Yokohama sequence features Mothra flying toward the Yokohama Landmark Tower, where JSDF personnel watch from inside. Mothra veers upward, causing Godzilla's atomic breath—intended for her—to strike the tower instead, destroying its upper levels and killing the soldiers. The scene was filmed before the September 11 attacks, which occurred during post-production. Toho considered removing it over concerns that the imagery of a skyscraper being damaged might be seen as insensitive in light of the World Trade Center's destruction. Kamiya feared it would need to be cut, but the company ultimately decided to retain it in the final release. In response to the attacks, Kaneko worked to make the film's anti-war message even clearer.

=== Music ===
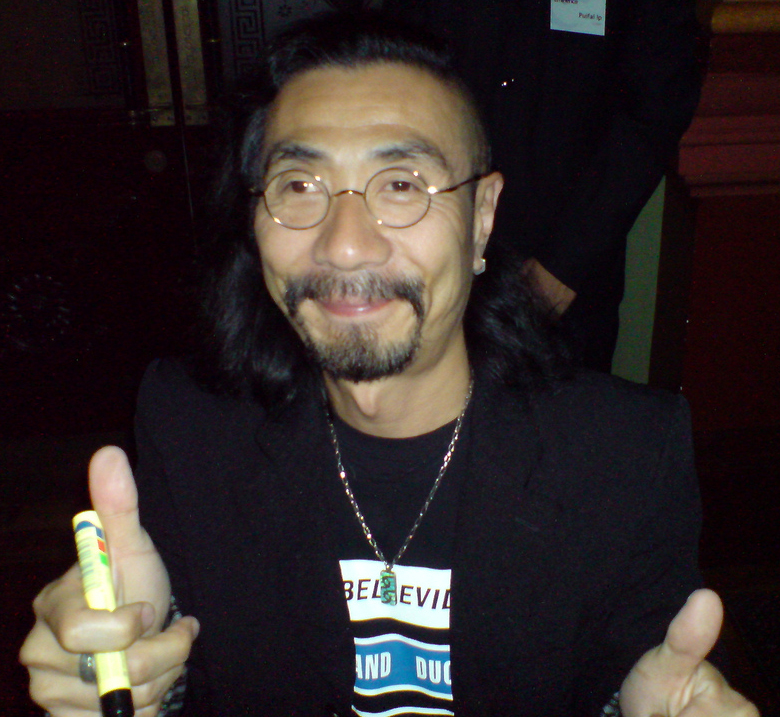
Kow Otani (pictured in 2007) composed the film's score.

The film's score was composed by Kow Otani, a frequent collaborator of Kaneko. Otani deliberately avoided imitating Akira Ifukube's iconic Godzilla motifs or his own earlier work on the Heisei Gamera trilogy. Instead, he employed a modern sound featuring electronic instruments and techno elements, drawing inspiration from his score for the 2001 film Shokoki! and the Italian progressive rock band Goblin.

Otani composed the themes for Godzilla, Mothra, and King Ghidorah in the unified key of A minor to reflect their shared mythological essence, despite their opposing roles in the story. Godzilla's theme uses low brass and strings (including trombones and double basses) for a heavy, ominous quality and was intentionally kept simple and hummable. Mothra's theme features a female chorus, while King Ghidorah's uses a male chorus. Baragon was not given a distinct theme; a dedicated motif was instead written for Yuri and Taizō Tachibana.

The score was recorded on October 7, 2001. The choral parts were performed by students from Toho Gakuen School of Music, recruited through Otani's daughter (a composition major at the school), whose youthful and unrefined voices Otani felt better suited the ancient, mythological tone. Mothra's theme incorporates pseudo-lyrics inspired by the Japonic and Ainu languages created in part by reading portions of the script in reverse. The Japan Self-Defense Forces theme was adapted from three of Otani's draft Godzilla motif candidates with an added snare drum for a marching feel. The Tachibana family motif includes a subtle, uncredited homage to Ifukube's Godzilla theme.

The end credits feature Ifukube's original "Godzilla Theme" and "War of the Monsters March", the latter from the soundtrack of Invasion of Astro-Monster (1965). Kaneko stated that the decision to incorporate these classic pieces was made at the beginning of production.

== Special and visual effects ==
=== Creature designs ===
==== Godzilla ====
Kaneko found it challenging to sketch Godzilla while preparing storyboards for the film. Set reporter and photographer Norman England described one of Kaneko's early storyboard drawings as resembling a "big, wet rat with jagged teeth". Kaneko provided suit maker Shinada with only general instructions, requesting a ferocious, frightening appearance that echoed the 1954 original and Mothra vs. Godzilla (1964), Shinada's favorite version of the character. Kaneko only saw drawings of the design by Shinada based on his instructions and did not view the final maquette until the March 2001 press junket, having entrusted the suit maker entirely with interpreting his vision.

Multiple versions of the suit were made, including a dynamic action version, a detailed close-up suit with expressive facial mechanisms, and an underwater suit that used air cylinders instead of electric motors. The primary suit was the largest (tallest and heaviest) ever created for a Godzilla film, with a total height of roughly 220 cm (2.2 meters) and a weight of over 70 kg. (Note: Attributed to multiple references:) Built to emphasize size contrast with Baragon, it featured sturdier proportions, a larger head, simplified ear holes, Iguanodon-inspired thumbs, and raised foot claws for the suit actor's safety. The dorsal fins returned to a smoother Shōwa-era style. The brown suit was lit with blue lighting on screen to evoke Godzilla's traditional color and sense of gigantism.

To portray the creature as the "embodiment of evil", the eyes consisted of solid white sclera with no pupils or irises, a late addition proposed by Shinada. Contrary to popular belief, the eyes were not fully white despite them seeming as such in the film; Shinada had initially given the monster suit fully white eyes, but Tomiyama objected because he felt this could become controversial since fully white eyes were often associated with sickness and disease in Japan. Shinada then added a subtle pattern of blood vessels around the edges of the eyeballs.

Mizuho Yoshida performed inside the suit at Shinada's request, with whom he had previously worked on Kaneko's Gamera 2: Attack of Legion (1996). He studied previous Godzilla films and ultimately mostly based his performance on Haruo Nakajima's in the 1954 original after early experiments looked incorrect on camera. For battle movements, he referenced Nakajima's work in King Kong vs. Godzilla (1962), and for walking, he drew from Kenpachiro Satsuma's Heisei-era performances. Because of the suit's weight, especially its head due to its mechanics, Yoshida was supposed to follow the intended dinosaur-like, forward-leaning posture in the suit but found it impossible to maintain that posture and was forced to have a hunched posture when donning it, making the suit's stomach appear to bulge out as well.

==== Baragon ====
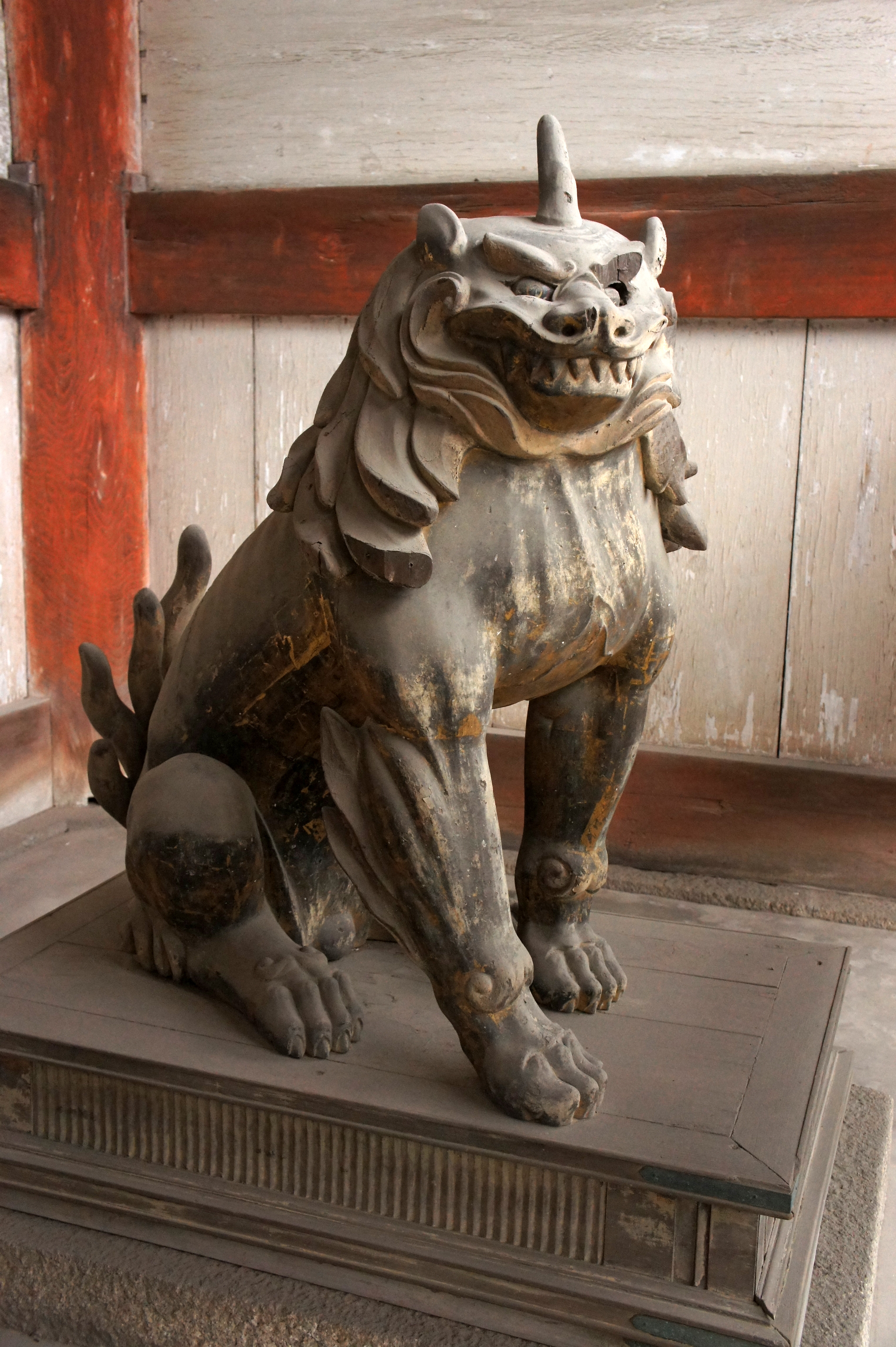
Baragon's design in the film was based on the traditional Japanese komainu (guardian lion-dog) motif similar to this statue.

Shinada had initially planned to construct the Baragon suit himself, but due to tight time constraints, it was outsourced to Kaimei Productions, which built the body, while Tetsuya Yoshida created the head prototype. Because of the short preparation period, the Baragon suit was made in parallel with Godzilla's suit. From the initial rough sketch stage, the design was conceived with a female performer in mind, and Shinada personally selected Rie Ota for the role. The creature's overall design was based on the motif of a komainu (guardian lion-dog).

By portraying Baragon, Ota became the first female suit actor in a Toho-produced kaiju film. In casting a petite woman in the role, it emphasized the size difference between Baragon and Godzilla, with Baragon roughly half Godzilla's height. Special care was taken during rehearsals to ensure Ota did not let her knees touch the ground while moving on all fours. She wore the same leotard under the suit that she had previously used as a combatant in hero shows. Toshinori Sasaki was the stunt actor for Baragon.

The head was built as an interchangeable unit for both close-up and action shots. It featured a movable eye mechanism, with a built-in battery and motor housed in the back. To contrast with Godzilla's solid white eyes, Baragon's pupils were given a lifelike appearance. The forelimbs ended in high-heeled sandal-like tips that matched the length of the hind legs; in shots requiring hand movement, the tips were removed so Ota could insert her own hands. A larger suit version was also constructed for close-up work, complete with illuminated horns, but neither this suit nor its interchangeable head appeared in the finished film. A head-only marionette was also used for certain shots.

==== Mothra ====
Mothra's props were sculpted by Shinada's company, Vi-Shop, and Boncraft. Shinada created the initial prototype, while Kiyotaka Tanigawa performed most of the detailed sculpting. No comprehensive design drawings were produced; the team worked primarily from verbal instructions and reference images. Two separate adult Mothras were built: one optimized for close-up shots and another for action sequences.

According to Kamiya, the adult Mothra was designed with the intention of it looking very different from previous interpretations of the kaiju, more aggressive and insect-like, with a resemblance closer to a bee than a moth. The design incorporated purple eyes and white feather-like detailing to give Mothra a distinctly feminine appearance, accented by cool blue tones on the wings. The eyes were positioned higher than the Heisei Mothra on the head to more closely resemble the character's 1961 debut design. The close-up featured radio-controlled legs and a mechanical abdomen capable of launching venomous spines. Most flying sequences were achieved using traditional puppetry. At Kaneko's request, the legs were smoothed by removing most of the traditional hair-like fibers to facilitate CGI integration, although some hair detailing was retained around the eyes to preserve visual recognizability. The animatronic's mechanical legs would often go haywire on set, moving by themselves without radio control input, causing complications.

The larval form was created by modifying the existing prop from Rebirth of Mothra (1996), with additional forehead wrinkles sculpted to give it a more stern expression. A physical cocoon prop was constructed and combined with digital matte paintings for its appearance. Wing-flapping motions were primarily performed via puppetry, but pneumatic cylinders were used to power the wings during Mothra's leap toward Godzilla. The metamorphosis sequence utilized the head from the adult action prop.

==== King Ghidorah ====
No design drawings were made for King Ghidorah, and its design was entrusted entirely to Fuyuki Shinada. Vi-Shop and Boncraft handled sculpting. The final design featured shorter necks, softer mammal-like facial features, a thicker tail, and one fewer finger on each wing. It incorporated bird-like elements with three-toed feet and heel protrusions, while the face was modeled after a dog or komainu. The three side head spikes were shaped after those of Varan.

The completed suit measured 180 cm in total length, the smallest Ghidorah suit in the series, and was treated as an incomplete form of the monster. To improve mobility, two types of necks were built: a longer one operated by piano wire puppetry and a shorter one allowing the suit actor to insert both arms. These were used interchangeably depending on the scene. Despite Shinada devising several ideas for the suit in sketches, no performer was able to be inside the main body of that suit. The wings could be set to either closed or open positions, and the suit was frequently suspended for flight sequences. The scales consisted of 15,000 individually molded soft vinyl pieces produced by toy manufacturer M1-go.

Kamiya decided to operate two of Ghidorah's three heads using hand puppets controlled by the suit actor. Having previously worked on Godzilla vs. King Ghidorah, Kamiya realized that controlling two monsters entirely by wires during a two-versus-one fight was nearly impossible, according to Kaneko. Kaneko added that the hand-puppet approach also made sense for this version of Ghidorah, as it was depicted as a juvenile, and therefore, its necks were logically shorter. A large three-times-scale neck model was also created for the ice cave scene, with compositing used to simulate three separate necks. A head-only marionette was also built and used for certain close-ups with Godzilla.

Akira Ohashi served as the suit actor, having originally been asked to play Anguirus during the film's conception. In the arm-insertion neck version, the weight of the heads caused his arms to droop.

=== Special effects ===
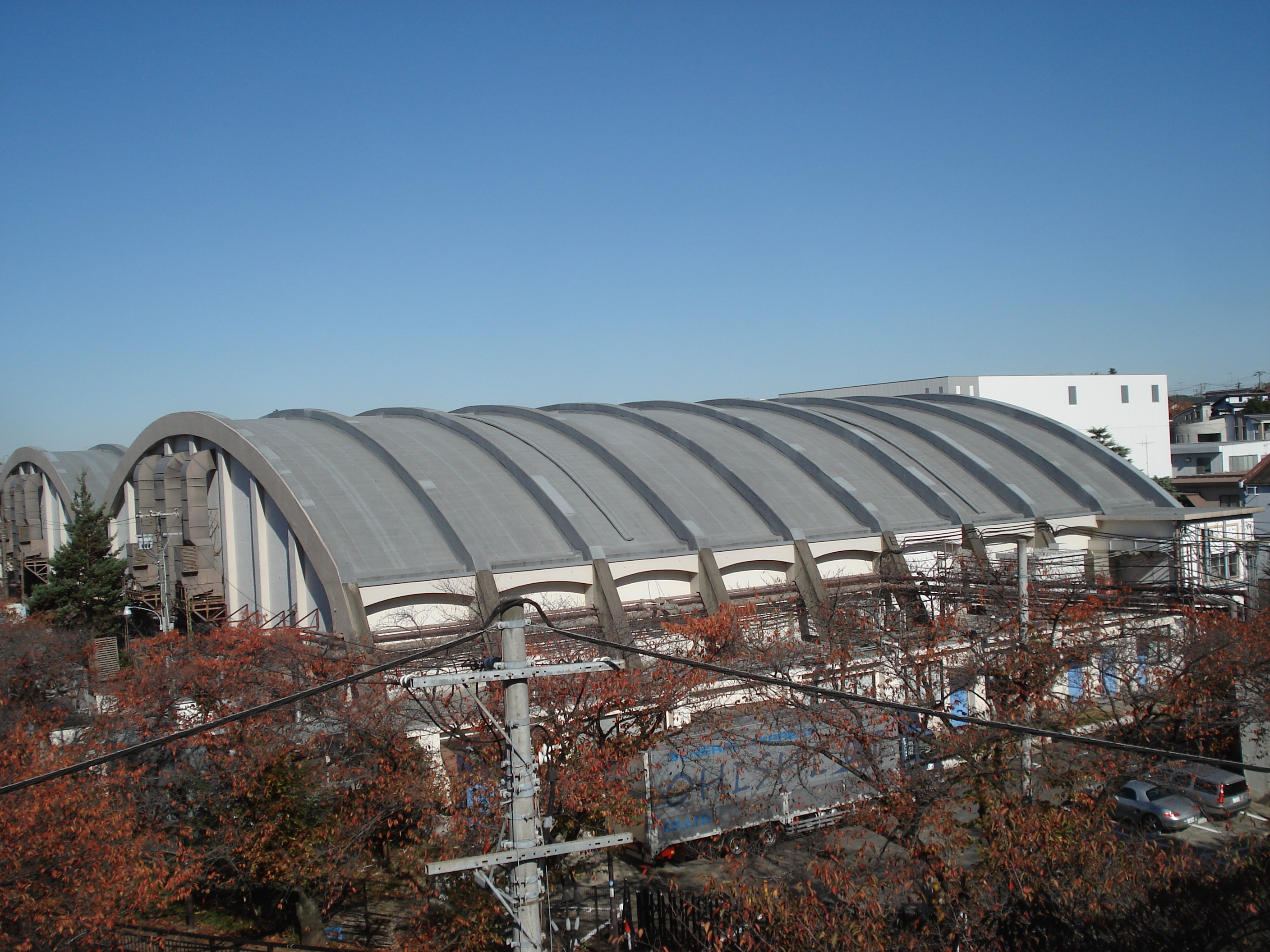
Studio 8/9 on the Toho Studios lot (pictured in 2008), where most of the special effects were filmed.

Special effects (tokusatsu) photography began on May 15 or 17, 2001, and de facto concluded on August 24. Satoshi Murakawa served as the cinematographer for the special effects unit, which was under Makoto Kamiya's direction. Most filming took place at Toho's Studio 9 to minimize setup time, with only the simulated underwater scenes shot in Studio 2 due to scheduling constraints. The effects work involved a combination of creature suits, miniatures, explosions, animatronics, and puppetry.

Despite budget cuts, special effects art director Toshio Miike noted that the production used more miniatures than before and built them larger and more realistic, causing costs to exceed the budget. An initial plan to match the Godzilla size from the Heisei series was dropped because the original 1/50-scale miniatures no longer existed; the team instead used a 1/25 scale to reuse previous models, while still constructing larger 1/10- to 1/12-scale miniatures for certain scenes. The minshuku trampled by Godzilla was built with fine detail, down to individual roof tiles. Many sets were constructed entirely within the camera frame, in the style of the Heisei Gamera series.

The Ōwakudani battle between Godzilla and Baragon was shot first for the film by the special effects team, with work beginning on May 15. The large miniature set of Ōwakudani, constructed on Stage 9, was initially planned as a fictional flat plaza for the battle between Godzilla and Baragon. However, after location scouting, Kamiya decided to incorporate the area's distinctive topography. The set was redesigned with significant elevation changes, and the background was filled in with mountain slopes to better reflect the real landscape. Because a 1/25-scale set could not fully depict the entire mountain range within the studio, casters were attached to allow the set to be moved and redressed for each shot. Due to budget constraints, the number of mountains was reduced from the original plan, with additional peaks quickly supplemented using expanded polystyrene foam. White steam rising from the rocky surfaces was generated using steamers typically used in barbershops. Low-angle shots were filmed on an open set.

Monster footage throughout the film was shot at a high frame rate to convey the ponderous motion of the giant creatures, requiring explosions to be precisely timed to the millisecond. For the scene in which Baragon falls from the sky and crashes into a helicopter (later composited in post-production), an even higher frame rate was used. The empty Baragon suit was suspended upside-down from the rafters, dropped, and ignited midway through the fall. It took just over a second for the suit to hit the floor; the high frame rate allowed the footage to be slowed down in editing, while the two explosions had to be maintained in perfect sync. The suit was set on fire three times and extinguished with fire extinguishers after each; Kamiya selected the third take.

In June, the special effects shoot was disrupted by several on-set injuries. Kamiya injured his leg, which later became infected due to neglect, but he continued working without interruption. Suitmaker Shinada arrived on set on June 22 with his arm in a sling after accidentally stabbing his hand while cutting materials. On June 27, special effects staffer Tomohiro Matsumoto fell from scaffolding, struck metal poles, and crashed onto the pavement, losing consciousness with facial bleeding. He was hospitalized but suffered no serious injuries; filming resumed later the same day.

Filming of the Yokohama sequences took place from July 11 to August 6, 2001. Since Yokohama had previously served as a setting in Godzilla vs. Mothra (1992), no miniature of Yokohama's Minato Mirai 21 district was built for this film. Instead, the focus was on shopping streets and urban areas, with the latter half of the battle shifting underwater. The shopping district destroyed by Mothra was modeled after the Noge-Miyakobashi shopping street. The miniature of the Yokohama Landmark Tower was constructed at a 1/100 scale. Murakawa aimed for a realistic nighttime cityscape by keeping genuinely dark areas unlit and illuminating the monsters from below with footlights to emphasize their massive scale; he noted that it was difficult to gain the lighting crew's understanding for this approach. The Yamashita Pier set was built at a 1/25 scale in the large pool, with the gantry crane reused from Godzilla vs. Megaguirus (2000).

The underwater battle scenes were shot in a simulated seabed constructed in Studio 1. To create a sense of floating, the monster suits were suspended with performers still inside them; because the rigging could not be easily adjusted, Kamiya recalled that this placed a significant burden on the suit actors and the pyrotechnics/operation team. The surface battle scenes were filmed during the day in the large pool and later processed into nighttime footage. The destroyed Bay Bridge was later achieved by removing the real bridge from the live-action plate and compositing in a matte painting.

Props used for Godzilla included a refurbished giant foot created for Invasion of Astro-Monster (1965) or The Return of Godzilla (1984) for the minshuku crushing scene and a tail-only prop for the hospital destruction sequence. The Yaizu landing scene combined suit work, miniatures, a life-size skin model, green-screen footage, and water elements. For aerial shots of the 5-meter-long miniature of the Aizu (referring to the special submarine Satsuma in context), the crew used the "Sky King", at the time Japan's tallest crane capable of reaching such heights, with the camera operated remotely from the ground. Godzilla's heat ray was given a cannon-like burst effect with a deliberate pause between the dorsal fin glow and firing at Kamiya's insistence. Its color was changed to blue to evoke radiation. Fluorescent lights were installed in the dorsal fins for the opening underwater scene.

=== Visual effects ===
The film featured around 350 visual effects shots, consisting mostly of digital compositing and computer-generated imagery (CGI)—roughly half the amount used in the previous film, Godzilla vs. Megaguirus (which had around 600). CGI was employed selectively to create dynamic monster action that was difficult to achieve practically and to add extra details to composite shots. The film marked a shift from the mostly in-house practical effects of earlier Toho productions toward treating live-action footage primarily as source material for digital compositing, a practice that increased in subsequent entries. Visual effects supervisor Hajime Matsumoto oversaw the digital work, handled by companies including Tokyo Laboratory, Japan Effects Center, Malin Post, and Nippon Eizo Creative.

More fluid action, such as Mothra dodging Godzilla's atomic breath, was created with 3DCG compositing. The larval Mothra's stinger attack and the adult Mothra's disintegration into glowing particles were rendered by Nippon Eizo Creative. King Ghidorah's full resurrection was rendered entirely in CGI, using an enlarged digital model based on its appearance in Godzilla vs. King Ghidorah.

A 3D model of Godzilla, created from dozens of detailed photographs, was used for underwater swimming scenes as well as overhead shots of the creature moving through mountainous terrain and across Yokohama. In some Yokohama background shots, both Godzilla and the surrounding cityscape were rendered entirely in CGI. Malin Post handled Godzilla's underwater swimming and bird's-eye-view shots, along with the 3DCG rendering of his internal body and heart at the ending. The submarine Aizu was composited onto a computer-generated ocean surface, with portions of its mast recreated digitally. The surging sea during Godzilla's appearance was also entirely CGI, including the fishing boats and foreground fisherman, with the sea surface distorted digitally to simulate turbulence.

Additional CGI elements included birds fleeing from Baragon, missile deployment effects, cracks in ice forming as Ghidorah awakens, swimming fish, and some wreckage.

== Release ==
=== Promotion ===
Illustrations by Tsuyoshi Nagano were used for the film's first official poster and accompanying press materials. Nagano's poster was leaked online prior to the press release. A second press release was issued, along with a new poster featuring a montage of still photographs from the production; these materials were also distributed to attendees at preview screenings. The film's still photographer, Takashi Nakao, whose images were used in the second poster, was not consulted or shown the design during its creation. Upon seeing the final version, Nakao expressed strong dissatisfaction and disowned the poster. Kaneko stated that images of destruction were deliberately toned down in the marketing due to sensitivities following the September 11 attacks; a similar approach to his earlier film Gamera: Guardian of the Universe (1995) had been used after the Kobe earthquake.

Toho partnered with Wonda Coffee for a television commercial featuring Godzilla suit actor Yoshida taking a break from filming. The company mounted a large promotional campaign, with the film's Godzilla suit appearing at several public events, including a fire safety campaign at Hibiya Godzilla Square on November 8, 2001. An episode of the quiz show Time Shock (co-hosted by the film's star Niiyama) was broadcast on November 12, wherein director Kaneko appeared as a guest and was comically penalized as a contestant. On December 12, the suit and actor Kakuda participated in a ceremonial first pitch at Tokyo Dome for a Professional Baseball Masters League game. Styled like a K-1 match, Kakuda "defeated" Godzilla with three strikeouts, after which the suit emitted smoke from its mouth, causing Kakuda to flee.

=== Theatrical ===
Godzilla, Mothra and King Ghidorah: Giant Monsters All-Out Attack premiered at the 14th Tokyo International Film Festival at Bunkamura's Orchard Hall in Shibuya, Tokyo, on November 3, 2001, with English subtitles. Before the film, Tomiyama, Kaneko, and cast members Niiyama, Uzaki, and Kakuda delivered stage greetings, joined by a performer in a Godzilla suit that emitted white smoke from its mouth. The audience responded with uncharacteristic enthusiasm for a Japanese screening, cheering and gasping throughout, and gave it a lengthy ovation at the end. At the time of the premiere, the film was not yet fully completed. The version screened had the same 105-minute runtime as the final cut and had been approved by Japan's Film Classification and Rating Organization (Eirin) on November 1. It contained four unfinished composite shots; three of these were completed the following day. Kaneko signed off on the final shot on November 4, the day after the premiere.

Observing the surge in popularity of Japanese media centered on "small and cute" characters—particularly Pokémon—and a relative decline in the popularity of kaiju films since the 1990s, Toho announced in July 2001—while Godzilla, Mothra and King Ghidorah was still in production—that the film would be paired as a double bill with the first Hamtaro movie, Hamtaro: Adventures in Ham-Ham Land, an anime feature adaptation of the popular children's anime series. The double feature was intended to appeal to both children and adults, framing GMK as a family-friendly release. The strategy was also intended to bolster commercial prospects after the disappointing solo box-office performances of the previous two Godzilla films and was partly motivated by a belief in the pairing as a source of "good luck". Kaneko said that because the double bill included a children's film, he intentionally set out to make the young audience members who had come primarily for Hamtaro cry and scream during his Godzilla movie. The two films were released together across Japan by Toho on December 15, 2001.

Toho heavily promoted the film at the American Film Market trade show in Santa Monica, California, in February 2002, and screened it there to attract an overseas distributor. Sony, which held overseas licensing rights to Toho's Godzilla films, considered a U.S. theatrical release for the film but ultimately failed to reach an agreement with Toho on distribution terms. Sony did, however, acquire theatrical prints for repertory and retrospective screenings. Its U.S. premiere took place on July 19, 2003, at the Pickwick Theater in Illinois, as part of the annual Godzilla fan convention G-Fest, followed by a screening at Canada's Fantasia International Film Festival on July 26; Kaneko attended both. The English-dubbed print received its first theatrical screening on October 23 at a theater in Oakland, California, as part of Thrillville's "Horror Host-Palooza" event.

In December 2025, a new 4K remastered version of the film received a G rating from Eirin in preparation for a planned theatrical re-release in Japan. It was shown in six Japanese theaters owned by Toho from June 19–25, 2026, as part of Toho's "Godzilla Theater" project. The film premiered in the UK on August 29, 2026, at the Barbican Centre in London, almost 25 years after its Japanese premiere. The latter screening was from a dubbed 35mm print and was introduced by genre expert Steven Sloss.

== Reception ==
=== Box office ===
Toho considered the commercial performance of Godzilla, Mothra and King Ghidorah: Giant Monsters All-Out Attack in Japan pivotal to the future of the Godzilla franchise. According to Tomiyama, strong results were expected to ensure its continuation, while disappointing returns would likely lead to its cancellation. The film was highly anticipated to perform as a blockbuster during the Japanese New Year holiday season.

The film opened with approximately $1.9 million and placed fourth at the Japanese box office in its first week. It trailed Harry Potter and the Philosopher's Stone (which remained dominant in its third week with $8.2 million) and Spy Game ($2.28 million), the latter also in its first week of release. Reports differ on the third-place film: according to Eiga.com, the GMK–Hamtaro double bill placed behind Sennen no Koi Story of Genji, while Variety placed Shrek ahead of it with $2.1 million and Story of Genji in fifth with $1.2 million. Both Shrek and Story of Genji were also in their first week of release.

Showing in over 278 theaters, GMK remained in the Japanese top ten for several weeks, falling to sixth place in its second week before rising to fifth the following week. By December 30, roughly two weeks after release, it had sold one million tickets—more than double the monthly ticket sales of the previous two Millennium films combined. In early 2002, the film's weekly box office earnings posted a 24% increase in the Nikkei average, a rare feat for a New Year Godzilla release and the second-highest yearly increase in the franchise after The Return of Godzilla (1984), which rose 43%. Toho expressed optimism about the film's potential overseas, projecting more than 4 million international ticket sales, a level last achieved by Godzilla vs. Mothra in 1992, but no such wide release transpired.

It ultimately grossed ¥2.71 billion (Note: Attributed to multiple references:) (just over $20 million) from 2.4 million admissions. (Note: Attributed to multiple references:) (Note: Box Office Mojo documented a total of $18,623,382 for the film, with data collection ending on January 25, 2002. However, that figure was incomplete, as Play magazine noted in March 2002 that the film was still screening in theaters.) The film more than doubled its production budget, becoming the highest-grossing film of the Millennium series and remaining so thereafter. Its performance has been credited with "rescuing" the series following the box-office disappointments of the prior two Millennium installments. As of 2024, it is the tenth-highest-grossing Godzilla film, unadjusted for inflation. When paired with its Hamtaro double bill, GMK ranked as the third-highest-grossing Japanese film of 2002, behind The Cat Returns–Ghiblies Episode 2 double-bill (¥6.48 billion) and Case Closed: The Phantom of Baker Street (¥3.4 billion). (Note: As was common practice in Japan at the time, the Motion Picture Producers Association of Japan counted box-office figures for films given a wide release just before the New Year (typically late November to December) toward the following calendar year's rankings.) Subsequently, it also received the Excellence/Silver Award (third place) for a Japanese film at the 20th Golden Gross Awards, presented by the Japan Association of Theatre Owners.

Tomiyama attributed the film's success to several key factors: the return of popular monsters, the involvement of the well-known Kaneko, and the additional boost provided by its pairing with the first film in the popular Hamtaro series.

=== Critical response ===
Godzilla, Mothra and King Ghidorah: Giant Monsters All-Out Attack received mostly positive critical reviews. On the review aggregator website Rotten Tomatoes, 65% of 17 critics' reviews are positive, with an average rating of 5.6/10. Many reviewers described it as one of the more exciting and visually impressive entries in the franchise. According to SciFi Japan, it was "internationally hailed as one of the best since Godzilla's heyday in the 1960's". Katsuhito Itō of Hobby Japan called it the best kaiju movie since the original 1954 Godzilla film. Troy Guinn of Eccentric Cinema opined it as one of only three Godzilla films suitable for viewers beyond dedicated kaiju fans.

Critics welcomed the film's return to the series' classic roots and its strong entertainment value. Steve Ryfle, writing for Cinefantastique, highlighted Kaneko's conscious effort to move away from recently overused tropes and restore the series to its fundamentals, evoking the spirit of the 1954 original. Ryfle argued that the film was the most deserving recent entry in the Godzilla franchise of a wide theatrical release in the United States, in contrast to Godzilla 2000, which he felt had doomed subsequent Millennium series films to direct-to-video releases overseas. Mark Schilling of The Japan Times commended the effective blend of thrilling monster battles and black comedy, which he found appealed to both children and adults.

Reviews responded strongly to the film's distinctive tone, thematic weight, and artistic ambitions under Kaneko's direction. Its timely imagery moved Kinema Junpo critic Ryūsuke Hikawa, who noted that it was released shortly after the September 11 attacks; he interpreted the monsters' indiscriminate destruction—ignoring all human concerns—as a metaphor for sudden threats confronting a complacent, peaceful society. Tsutomu Isoda, also writing for Kinema Junpo, observed that audiences anticipating a light, innocent entertainment film would be surprised by its serious auteur approach that resisted easy classification. He commended the film for restoring a genuinely terrifying Godzilla, viewing this as emblematic of its uncompromising stance amid difficult times for the kaiju genre. Henshin! Online and Scarecrow Video deemed the film's human characters were particularly well-developed. Tetsuji Akimoto in Sunday Mainichi praised the film's military simulation-like approach, and highlighted Kaneko's emphasis on procedural accuracy, consistent with his Gamera films.

The special effects drew particular praise. Hikawa and Video Watchdog singled out the first half of the film—especially Godzilla's rampage and battle with Baragon—as its high point. Hikawa wrote that these sequences recaptured the raw destructive power of early kaiju films and featured compositing of live-action and effects footage that was nearly flawless for a Japanese production. Schilling approved of the reliance on traditional suitmation techniques rather than heavy CGI, and Ryfle regarded the results as Toho's strongest work to date, specifically praising the monster suit designs, selective CGI, and cinematography that better conveyed Godzilla's scale. Henshin! Online also viewed the effects as a significant improvement over previous Millennium series entries.

Some critics were more reserved concerning the film's darker tone, revisionist approach to the title monsters, and third act. John Wallis of DVD Talk found the story weak and overly somber, arguing that the grim, horror-influenced tone clashed with a Destroy All Monsters-style monster battle. The Milwaukee Journal Sentinel concluded that the movie worked best when embracing its inherent cheesiness but faltered when trying to make deeper statements about Japan's historical belligerence. Ryfle and Video Watchdog's reviewer felt the balance between human drama and monster action was less effective than in Kaneko's Gamera films toward the climax, with the latter adding that they found the final act lacking tension due to the revisionism of the title monsters. The Boston Globe's Wesley Morris observed that Godzilla's near-indestructibility reduced tension in the final battle, even while acknowledging the film delivered on the absurdity its title promised.

== Post-release ==
=== Aftermath ===
The film's thematic earnestness and relatively serious tone reportedly alienated some Toho executives, despite strong fan praise for Kaneko's approach. Although GMK ends on an open note that appears to set up a sequel, no continuation featuring Kaneko was ever planned once principal photography wrapped. The director was not invited back for future entries in the franchise, widely attributed (though never officially confirmed) to creative differences that arose during production. Kaneko's artistic ambitions reportedly clashed with the studio's more commercial priorities, straining his relationship with Tomiyama. As a result, Toho instead rehired Tezuka of Godzilla vs. Megaguirus to direct the next film in the Millennium series, Godzilla Against Mechagodzilla (2002).

In early 2002, Kaneko publicly expressed interest in helming another Godzilla film, but Toho did not extend an offer. Around the same time, Kadokawa Daiei Studio (successor to Daiei, which produced Kaneko's Gamera trilogy) approached Toho about a potential Godzilla and Gamera crossover film, influenced in part by Kaneko's work on the trilogy and GMK. Toho declined the proposal and instead proceeded with Tezuka's Godzilla Against Mechagodzilla. In a 2007 interview with The Brooklyn Rail, Kaneko described a Gamera vs. Godzilla film as his dream project, while acknowledging the difficulties of securing cooperation between the former rival studios Toho and Daiei. He paid homage to both franchises by featuring toy versions of his Godzilla and Gamera designs fighting in an episode of Ultraman Max (TV 2005), which he directed.

GMK was ultimately the most critically and commercially successful film in the franchise's Millennium era. Encouraged by its box office success as a double bill with a Hamtaro animated feature, Toho continued the strategy to attract younger audiences for the next two entries: Godzilla Against Mechagodzilla (2002) and Godzilla: Tokyo S.O.S. (2003). After Tokyo S.O.S. delivered only modest results, the studio abandoned the format for the 50th-anniversary film Godzilla: Final Wars (2004). Final Wars became a major box office bomb, effectively ending the Millennium era of Godzilla films.

=== Home media ===
Toho released the film on VHS in Japan on August 2, 2002, and on DVD on August 21. Toho's three-disc DVD edition included two discs of special features, such as audio commentary (featuring Kaneko, Niiyama, and assistant director Hideaki Murakami) and a two-hour behind-the-scenes documentary containing interviews and production footage. In October 2002, Hong Kong-based distributor Universe released a Region 3 DVD with optional Chinese and English subtitles, as well as a Cantonese dub.

A re-edited version prepared by Kaneko aired on TV Tokyo on November 26, 2002. This cut was the final project of editor Isao Tomita, who died in October 2002. It was promoted as a "special edited version" and concluded with on-screen text teasing Godzilla's return, followed by the trailer for Godzilla Against Mechagodzilla. The television edit has never been released on DVD or Blu-ray, though it was rebroadcast on BS NTV on August 7, 2016, and on BS TV Tokyo on May 30, 2019.

The film made its U.S. television premiere on August 31, 2003, in an English-dubbed version on the Sci-Fi Channel by Sony Pictures Television. It was released on DVD in the United States on January 6, 2004, by Columbia TriStar Home Entertainment; the release included both the original Japanese audio and English dub, with optional English or French subtitles. A Blu-ray edition, bundled with Godzilla Against Mechagodzilla, followed in September 2014. Its home video releases in the U.S. and overseas were highly successful financially.

In Japan, the film's home video releases earned ¥373 million (60,000 units sold) through sell-through sales and ¥516 million (43,000 units) through rentals by 2004, for a combined total of ¥889 million. It was also included in the Godzilla Final Box collection released on April 22, 2005. Later Japanese DVD editions include the "Godzilla 60th Anniversary Edition" (a limited, lower-priced version) on May 14, 2014, and the Toho DVD Masterpiece Selection Edition on June 15, 2016.

The film began streaming on Netflix in the United States on July 1, 2026.

== Themes ==
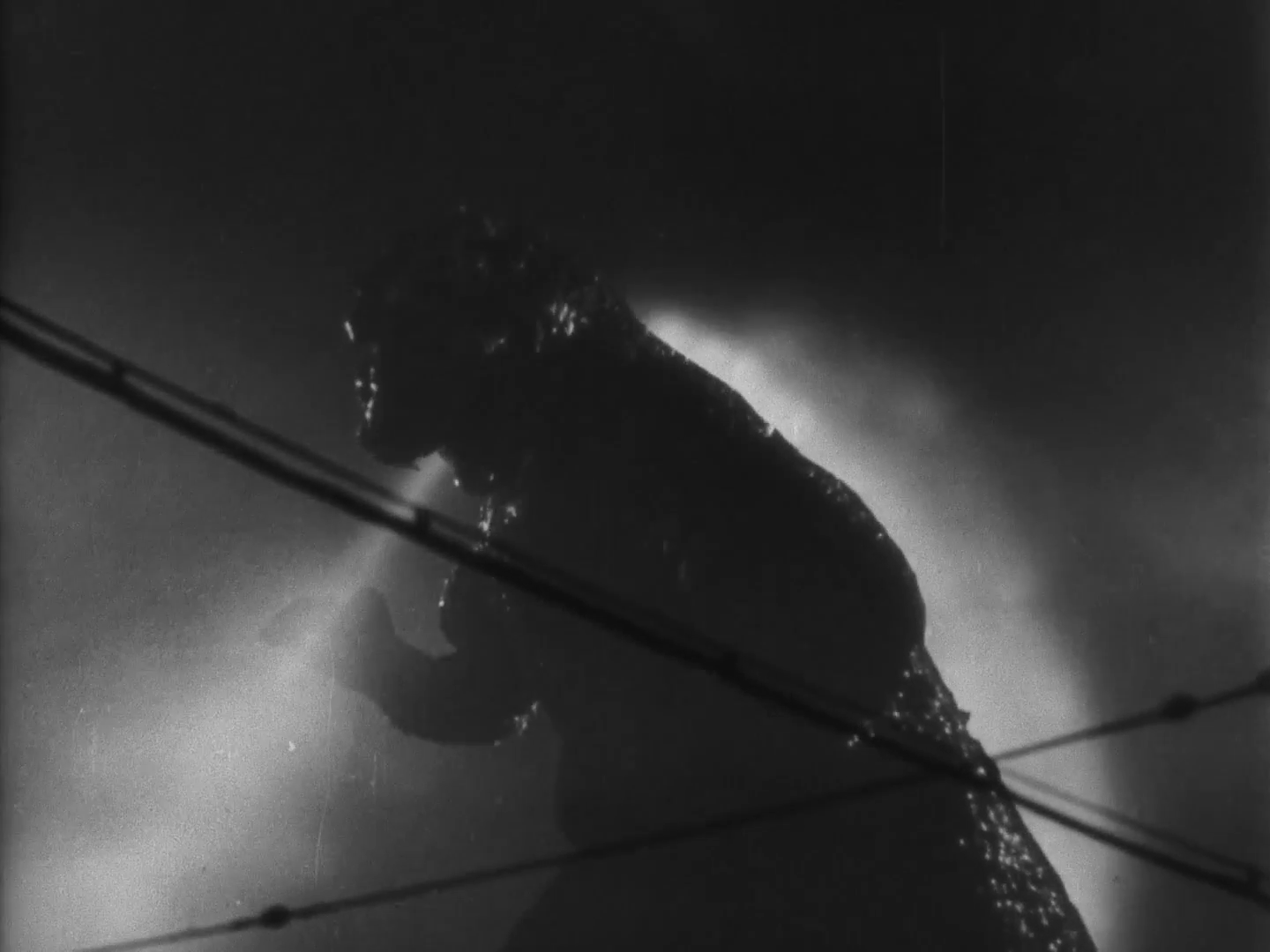
Godzilla in GMK draws from interpretations of the 1954 original (pictured), portraying the monster as a vengeful spirit of Pacific War dead punishing Japan for historical amnesia.

Godzilla, Mothra and King Ghidorah: Giant Monsters All-Out Attack explores an overtly nationalistic and spiritually layered interpretation of the Godzilla mythos. The film draws inspiration from interpretations of the 1954 Godzilla film favored by some Japanese right-wing critics and film scholars, who viewed the monster as the unquiet spirits of those who died in the Pacific War. Here, Godzilla is reimagined not merely as a product of nuclear devastation but as an onryō—a wrathful, vengeful spirit—embodying the aggregated souls of soldiers, sailors, and civilians killed or left to die at the hands of the Imperial Japanese Armed Forces. These anguished spirits have coalesced inside Godzilla, returning to punish modern Japan for its historical amnesia and postwar complacency. The enigmatic elder Hirotoshi Isayama (played by Amamoto) explains that they are "the souls of countless people who fell victim in the Pacific War congregated in Godzilla's body", driving the monster's fury at a nation that has forgotten their suffering and cries.

This spiritual dimension is balanced against Godzilla's lingering atomic origins as a mutant dinosaur created by the bomb, though the exact balance between nuclear mutation and mystical vengeance is deliberately left ambiguous. Kaneko, a lifelong pacifist, sought to infuse the film with an anti-war perspective while retaining the nuclear element because he felt audiences expected a realistic Godzilla. He believed the story became far more powerful when layered with this fantasy and spiritual dimension, using Godzilla's rampage to critique Japan's tendency to bury uncomfortable wartime memories, but had to do so indirectly to avoid controversy. In Kaneko's own words: "It's as if Godzilla is carrying the shadow of the war, and of the atomic bombings. A creature that doesn't die even if it's hit by bullets ultimately resembles a ghost. I wanted to try doing Godzilla as a ghost story, just this once." GMK also serves as a tribute to the 1954 original, echoing its imagery of repeated civilian trauma and nuclear horror.

The film also presents a strongly affirmative and nationalistic vision of Japanese identity and strength. It reimagines Mothra, Baragon, and King Ghidorah as the Guardian Monsters, also known as the "Sacred Beasts of Yamato"—legendary guardian deities awakened to defend the homeland—elevating the kaiju into mythical protectors of the Japanese nation and state. In the climactic battle, these legendary beings stand with the Japan Self-Defense Forces (JSDF), presenting the modern military as a worthy successor and protector that safeguards Japan's past, present, and future. The entire narrative unfolds in an alternate timeline where Japan exists as the fully sovereign Japanese Democratic Republic and has peace treaties with the United States and Russia.

While the JSDF is depicted as professional and honorable, the film questions its effectiveness and true role as protector of the Japanese people. As part of a national cover-up to restore pride, the JSDF publicly claimed sole credit for defeating the original Godzilla. Admiral Tachibana later learns from his superior that this is false; in reality, the monster was killed by a scientist who sacrificed his life deploying an experimental weapon, consistent with the events of the 1954 film.

Author William Tsutsui notes how the film blends classic kaiju spectacle with a bold nationalistic undercurrent and sincere respect for Japan's armed services, capturing the conservative mood of early-2000s Japan amid prolonged economic stagnation (known as the Lost Decades) and easing tensions with America. Scholar Hiromi Nakano adds that Godzilla in this film functions as an ambivalent "living dead" figure—both insider and outsider—whose blank white eyes symbolize death itself, allowing viewers to safely confront and temporarily conquer deep national traumas.

== Legacy ==
=== Retrospective assessments ===
Godzilla, Mothra and King Ghidorah: Giant Monsters All-Out Attack is widely regarded as one of the best films in the Godzilla franchise. A retrospective capsule review in Leonard Maltin's Movie Guide assessed that "Kaneko was brought in to 'shake things up,' and he certainly succeeded with this dark, very violent epic". The critic noted how it is "considered by many fans to be the apex of the series, with terrific special effects and a consistently adult tone; worth seeing even for nondevotees [sic]". In 2021, the film was ranked at number 14 on Variety's list "All the Godzilla Movies Ranked". In 2023, Collider ranked GMK as the best film in the series. The following year, IndieWire listed it number 2 on their ranking of every installment, behind the 1954 film. As of 2024, it is the 18th highest-rated Godzilla film on Rotten Tomatoes.

In 2008, filmmaker Jörg Buttgereit listed the film among his top ten favorite Japanese monster movies, describing it as the "most convincing Godzilla movie ever". According to Rolling Stone, actor Nicolas Cage has also spoken positively about the film, encouraging audiences not to overlook it amongst the Godzilla franchise.

=== Cultural influence ===
Assets from the film have since been reused in other media. Some of the miniature Yokohama set was later used as Tokyo in Quentin Tarantino's Kill Bill: Volume 1 (2003) during the sequence in which the Bride arrives by plane. The set was provided by Shinji Higuchi, who coordinated production in Japan for Tarantino. According to Kill Bill actor David Carradine, Tarantino hired the same Japanese team to capture "that Toho Tokyo look" and liken the Bride's arrival to that of Godzilla's. The GMK King Ghidorah suit has also been reused in short films, arcade games, pachinko machines, and a 2023 Marubeni commercial. Its neck was extended by Kaimei Productions for the 2018 pachinko game CR True King of the Monsters Godzilla. As of 2024, the suit remains in use and appeared in the official shorts Fest Godzilla 4: Operation Jet Jaguar (2023) and Fest Godzilla 5: All Monsters Showdown (2024). All Godzilla props and suits from GMK were reported to still exist as of 2022, although most had not been reused since; in April 2025, Castem released a Godzilla foot-shaped iron hammer made from a 3D scan of the GMK suit.

Filmmaker Takashi Yamazaki has cited Godzilla, Mothra and King Ghidorah as one of his favorite Godzilla films. He based the appearance of Godzilla in Always: Sunset on Third Street 2 (2007) on Kaneko's, even giving it white eyes. In a 2023 discussion with Kaneko following a screening of GMK, Yamazaki revealed that the film had a significant subconscious influence on Godzilla Minus One (2023), despite him having largely forgotten its plot. After rewatching GMK shortly before the event, Yamazaki was surprised to notice strong similarities between the two films' endings and a scene in which Godzilla emits a heat ray from its body. Director Michael Dougherty also paid homage in Godzilla: King of the Monsters (2019). He drew inspiration from the scene featuring two twin girls gazing up at Mothra, using it as the basis for reimagining the Shobijin (Mothra's twin priestesses) as humans rather than overt fantasy characters.

The film has also been referenced elsewhere. In The Grim Adventures of Billy & Mandy, the 2006 episode "Giant Billy and Mandy All-Out Attack" parodies the film's title and the kaiju genre in general. Elements of the film universe appear in the 2025 Marvel comic Godzilla vs. Thor, which serves as a loose continuation featuring the same incarnation of Godzilla, resurrected from the still-living heart left in the sea at the end of the film.
