= Sky Odyssey =

2000 video game

- North American box art
- Developers: Cross; XAX Entertainment; Future Creates (Note: Additional work by Sony Computer Entertainment Japan.)
- Publishers: JP/EU: Sony Computer Entertainment; NA: Activision
- Director: Mitsunori Shoji
- Producer: Yasuhide Kobayashi
- Programmers: Takashi Iwanaga; Akihiro Terada; Tadao Shohyama; Takayuki Hanamasu
- Artists: Syuji Ueda; Ryo Yokomizo; Keisuke Izaki; Yoshinori Ikeshita
- Composer: Kow Otani
- Platform: PlayStation 2
- Release: NA: November 17, 2000; JP: January 25, 2001; PAL: April 27, 2001
- Genre: Flight simulator
- Mode: Single-player

Sky Odyssey, known in Japan as The Sky Odyssey (スカイ オデッセイ, Sukai Odessei), is a flight simulation video game developed by Cross, XAX Entertainment and Future Creates and published by Sony Computer Entertainment for the PlayStation 2. It was released in 2000 in North America by Activision and 2001 internationally. The game's soundtrack was composed by Kow Otani, who also composed the music for Shadow of the Colossus, a variety of Gamera films, and various anime.

The game follows an Indiana Jones-style storyline in which the player character flies through several areas of a fictional world, collecting artifacts as well as pieces of a map. The adventure mode of the game focuses on reaching the hidden tower of Maximus, which is located on one of four uncharted islands which are explored in the game.

== Gameplay ==
The player in the game is given control of 10 different aircraft, 7 of which must be unlocked. These range from real world aircraft (such as the Fairey Swordfish), to prototypes that never saw actual flight (e.g. the Kyūshū J7W), to completely fictional ones. While a few of these are military aircraft, no combat actually takes place in the game. Instead players are given the task of flying complex missions to search for the map pieces needed to find the Tower of Maximus. Most missions involve traversing from one point on the games map to the next, but rarely is this straight forward. The missions often follow a path that requires flight through extreme terrain such as canyons, caves, and mountain peaks.

To further complicate things, rogue weather patterns, rock slides, and other natural phenomena will constantly impede on progress into these areas and will often threaten to destroy the player's aircraft. In addition, several of the game's levels require certain tasks to be completed to advance. Examples of these include mid air refueling with a moving train, or attempting a fuel dump in order to cross a high mountain pass. After the mission is complete, players are given a score ranging from A+ to D and can buy new parts to customize their aircraft. Higher scores lead to more parts being made available for purchase. In addition to the main adventure there are two bonus modes called Target Mode and Sky Canvas Mode.

In Target Mode players must take off and navigate through a series of targets in the shortest amount of time as possible and return to the runway for landing. Sky Canvas Mode requires players to Skywrite different words and symbols before the smoke can be blown away by the wind. There is also a training mode and a Free Flight mode. Training mode introduces players to the controls of the game while Free Flight mode lets players freely fly their unlocked aircraft without the restrictions or dangers found in the main part of the game.

== Reception ==
Reception

Aggregate score
Aggregator	Score
Metacritic	79/100

Review scores
Publication	Score
AllGame	4/5
CNET Gamecenter	8/10
Edge	6/10
Electronic Gaming Monthly	7.83/10 (Note: Two critics of Electronic Gaming Monthly gave the game each a score of 8/10, and the other gave it 7.5/10.)
EP Daily	5.5/10
Famitsu	28/40
Game Informer	7.75/10
GameSpot	8.3/10
GameSpy	75%
IGN	9/10
Next Generation	3/5
Official U.S. PlayStation Magazine	3/5

The game received "generally favorable reviews" according to the review aggregation website Metacritic. Kevin Rice of NextGen said, "Sky Odyssey is one of those peculiar games that will have half the people loving it and the other half wondering what the commotion is. It's definitely good, but it won't suit everyone's taste." In Japan, Famitsu gave it a score of 28 out of 40. GamePro said in a negative review, "The controls are the game's saving grace, but the other features ground Sky Odyssey indefinitely. Drab environments and incredible amounts of draw-in make up the visuals (the half-point is for the so-so detail on the aircraft). Even more egregious, the awful background symphony doesn't remotely go with the game's ambiance. You'll have more fun cruising third-class on a no-name charter flight than playing this awful flyer." (Note: GamePro gave the game 1.5/5 for graphics, 2/5 for sound, 5/5 for control, and 2.5/5 for fun factor.)

IGN said that the game "belongs in the software library of every PlayStation 2 owner." It also said that while some may be turned off by the game's lack of violence, "the intensity and adrenaline levels that players will reach while playing this game really surpass what you'll ever likely get in a straight action game." GameSpot praised the game for its wide variety of aircraft and missions. GameSpot also liked the weather effects and physics in the game.

Both sides however noted that the game's graphics were not up to par, and stated that the game was somewhat difficult for newcomers.

Not all reviews were positive however. IGN and GameSpot noted that the game is not for everyone, especially those expecting a "straight up action game." Still, GameSpot said in the closing of their review that, "those that are willing to overlook the game's graphical imperfections and can grapple with its relatively steep learning curve will be rewarded with a fully satisfying game experience."

The game won the awards for "Simulation Game of 2000" and "Game No One Played of 2000" at IGN's Best of 2000 Awards, and was also a runner-up for Overall PS2 Game of the Year. It was also a runner-up for the "Best PlayStation 2 Game" and "Best Simulation Game" awards at GameSpot's Best and Worst of 2000 Awards.

In an IGN list of top 10 most underrated games, the game came in at number 6 on the list.
