= Kow Otani =

Japanese composer (born 1957)

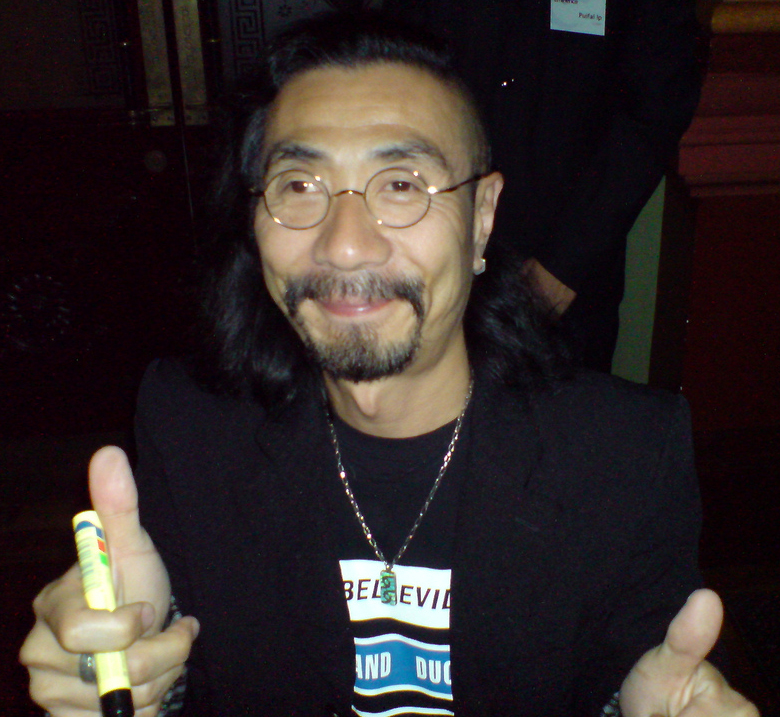
- Otani in 2007

Background information
- Born: May 1, 1957 (age 69); Tokyo, Japan
- Occupations: Composer, arranger, keyboardist
- Instrument: Piano
- Years active: 1987–present

Kow Otani (大谷 幸, Ōtani Kō; born May 1, 1957) is a Japanese composer. He is best known for creating the soundtracks for the Heisei Gamera trilogy, Godzilla, Mothra and King Ghidorah: Giant Monsters All-Out Attack, Mobile Suit Gundam Wing, and Shadow of the Colossus.

== Biography ==
Kow Otani was born in Tokyo, Japan. After graduating from university, he became a founding member of Yuji Saito's music production company Imagine in November 1986. The company has grown to feature musicians like Kohei Tanaka, Shiro Hamaguchi, Hayato Matsuo, and Shinji Miyazaki, who have become well known for cinematic scoring and orchestration through Otani. In 1987, he made his debut as an anime composer with the popular manga adaptation City Hunter, which earned him recognition in the industry. He later went on to work on titles such as Spy Games (1988), The Ultimate Teacher (1988), The Yadamura Waltz (1988), and You're Under Arrest (1994). The anime Future GPX Cyber Formula (1991) and Mobile Suit Gundam Wing (1995) and several films in the Gamera series are some of his most well-known works.

In 2001, he created the score to the film Godzilla, Mothra and King Ghidorah: Giant Monsters All-Out Attack. Other notable scores by Otani include Gundam Wing (1995), Outlaw Star (1998), Gundam Wing: Endless Waltz (1998), Cross Fire (2000), The SoulTaker (2001), Haibane Renmei (2002), Zatch Bell! (2003), Eyeshield 21 (2005), Pumpkin Scissors (2006), Deltora Quest (2007), and Over Drive (2007). He has also been the music director and keyboardist of the band Dreams Come True. He appeared at Eminence Symphony Orchestra's events A Night in Fantasia 2007: Symphonic Games Edition and Unearthing Eden ~The sounds of AINARU~ in 2007.

Throughout his career, Otani has also composed music for several video games, making his debut with the 1995 shooter game Philosoma. In 2000, he created the soundtrack to the flight simulator Sky Odyssey. He scored Shadow of the Colossus in 2005, his most famous video game work. Otani was responsible for composing the music for Wild Arms: Twilight Venom (2000), an anime adaptation of the Wild Arms video game series; he also arranged compositions of Michiko Naruke's music from the series. He did two more video game to anime adaptations: Night Warriors: Darkstalkers' Revenge (1997) and Popolocrois Monogatari (1998). In 2005, he created the track "Madness" alongside Hiroko Shigezumi for the Square Enix game Heavy Metal Thunder.

== Discography ==
=== Anime ===
- City Hunter (1987)
- The Yamadamura Waltz (1988)
- Ultimate Teacher (1988)
- Spy Games (1988)
- Gokudō Sensō: Butōha (1991)
- Future GPX Cyber Formula (1991)
- Future GPX Cyber Formula 11 (1992)
- Yonigeya Hompo 2 (1993)
- Sotsugyō Ryokō: Nihon kara Kimashita (1994)
- You're Under Arrest (1994)
- Future GPX Cyber Formula ZERO (1994)
- Mobile Suit Gundam Wing (1995)
- Birdy the Mighty (1996)
- School Ghost Story 3 (1997)
- Night Warriors: Darkstalkers' Revenge (1997)
- Gundam Wing: Endless Waltz (1998)
- Outlaw Star (1998)
- Popolocrois Monogatari (1998)
- Wild Arms: Twilight Venom (2000)
- Cross Fire (2000)
- The SoulTaker (2001)
- Zoids: New Century Zero (2001)
- Haibane Renmei (2002)
- Lucky Ears (2003)
- Zatch Bell! (2003)
- Daphne in the Brilliant Blue (2004)
- Eyeshield 21 (2005)
- Shakugan no Shana series (2005-2012)
- Pumpkin Scissors (2006)
- Ghost Slayers Ayashi (2006)
- Yoshinaga-san Chi no Gargoyle (2006)
- Over Drive (2007)
- Deltora Quest (2007)
- Gunslinger Girl -Il Teatrino- (2008)
- Blade of the Immortal (2008)
- Tokyo Magnitude 8.0 (2009)
- Hakuouki (2010)
- .hack//Quantum (2010–2011)
- Hyouge Mono (2011–2012)
- Hakuoki (2011)
- Another (2012)
- Humanity Has Declined (2012)
- Arata: The Legend (2013)
- Wise Man's Grandchild (2019)
- Digimon Ghost Game (2021)
- Requiem of the Rose King (2022)
- Dahlia in Bloom (2024)
- Reincarnated as a Dragon Hatchling (2026)
- Magic Repo Man (2026)

=== Films ===
- Yellow Fangs (1990)
- No Worries on the Recruit Front (1991)
- My Soul Is Slashed (1991)
- The Games Teachers Play (1992)
- Graduation Journey: I Came from Japan (1993)
- It's a Summer Vacation Everyday (1994)
- Gamera: Guardian of the Universe (1995)
- Gamera 2: Attack of Legion (1996)
- Tenchi the Movie 2: The Daughter of Darkness (1998)
- Gamera 3: Revenge of Iris (1999)
- Godzilla, Mothra and King Ghidorah: Giant Monsters All-Out Attack (2001)
- Like Asura (2003)
- The Boat to Heaven (2003)
- Blade of the Phantom Master (2004)
- The iDol (2006)
- Shakugan no Shana (2007)
- Colorful (2010)
- Crayon Shin-chan: Invasion!! Alien Shiriri (2017)
- Crayon Shin-chan: Burst Serving! Kung Fu Boys ~Ramen Rebellion~ (2018)
- Crayon Shin-chan: Crash! Graffiti Kingdom and Almost Four Heroes (2020)
- Godai - The Wunderkind (2020)

=== Video games ===
- Philosoma (1995)
- Macross Digital Mission VF-X (1997)
- Sky Odyssey (2001)
- Heavy Metal Thunder (2005)
- Shadow of the Colossus (2005)
- Sengoku Basara 3 (2010)
- Diablo III (2012) Additional tracks included as part of Echoes of War
- Shadow of the Colossus (2018 remake)
- Beast of Reincarnation (2026)
