= Gazgasak =

Gazgasak (Persian: گزگسك) may refer to:

- Gazgasak, Mangur-e Gharbi
- Gazgasak, Piran
