= Jira =

Jira may refer to:

- Jira (given name)
- Jira (software), a bug-tracking, issue-tracking and project-management software application
- Jira (Toho) or Zilla, a fictional giant dinosaur-like monster
- Japan Robot Association or Japan Industrial Robot Association
- La Jira, a festival celebrated in some areas of Spain, such as Oviñana
- Jira or Jeera, use of cumin in Indian cuisine
  - Jira water, a drink made from cumin

== See also ==
- Jireh (disambiguation)
- Zira (disambiguation)
