= Seh Gerdekan =

Seh Gerdekan سه گردكان
- Village
- Location within Iran
- Coordinates: 36°40′07″N 45°09′39″E
- Country: Iran
- Province: West Azerbaijan
- County: Piranshahr
- Bakhsh: Central
- Rural District: Piran

Population (2006)
  - Total: 77
- Time zone: UTC+3:30 (IRST)
  - Summer (DST): UTC+4:30 (IRDT)

Seh Gerdekan (Persian: سه گردكان, also Romanized as Seh Gerdekān) is a village in Piran Rural District, in the Central District of Piranshahr County, West Azerbaijan Province, Iran. At the 2006 census, its population was 77, in 8 families.
