= Jereh =

Jereh may refer to:

- Jereh Group, a Chinese oilfield services company and oilfield equipment manufacturer
- Jereh Rural District (Kazerun County), a rural district in Kazerun County, Fars province, Iran
  - Jereh, Iran, a village in Fars province
- Jereh Rural District (Ramhormoz County), a rural district in Ramhormoz County, Khuzestan province, Iran

== See also ==
- Jireh (disambiguation)
