= Zira =

Zira may refer to:

== Places ==
- Zirə, Azerbaijan
- Zira, Iran (disambiguation), places in Iran
- Zira, Punjab, a town in Ferozepur district of Punjab, India
  - Zira (Assembly Constituency)

== Fictional characters ==
- Zira (Centuria), fictional aide in the Japanese web manga Centuria
- Zira (The Lion King II), a lioness and the antagonist in Disney's 1998 direct-to-video animated film The Lion King II: Simba's Pride
- Zira (Planet of the Apes), a chimpanzee character in the novel and movie series Planet of the Apes

== Other uses ==
- Zira (beetle) a leaf beetle genus of tribe Chrysomelini
- Zira FK, an Azerbaijani football club
- Zira, a TellMe voice persona
- Zira or jeera, use of cumin in Indian cuisine
- "Zira (Call Out My Name)", a song by Redd Kross on the album Third Eye

== See also ==
- Zira'a, Homs Governorate, Syria
- Jira (disambiguation)
