= Jeran, Iran =

Jeran جران
- Village
- Country: Iran
- Province: West Azerbaijan
- County: Piranshahr
- Bakhsh: Central
- Rural District: Piran

Population (2006)
  - Total: 236
- Time zone: UTC+3:30 (IRST)
  - Summer (DST): UTC+4:30 (IRDT)

Jeran (Persian: جران, also Romanized as Jerān) is a village in Piran Rural District, in the Central District of Piranshahr County, West Azerbaijan Province, Iran. At the 2006 census, its population was 236, in 34 families.
