= Godzilla (1998 film) =

American film by Roland Emmerich

- Theatrical release poster
- Directed by: Roland Emmerich
- Screenplay by: Dean Devlin; Roland Emmerich
- Story by: Ted Elliott; Terry Rossio; Dean Devlin; Roland Emmerich
- Based on: Godzilla by Toho Co., Ltd.
- Produced by: Dean Devlin
- Starring: Matthew Broderick; Jean Reno; Maria Pitillo; Hank Azaria; Kevin Dunn; Michael Lerner; Harry Shearer
- Cinematography: Ueli Steiger
- Edited by: Peter Amundson; David J. Siegel
- Music by: David Arnold
- Production companies: Centropolis Entertainment; Fried Films; Independent Pictures
- Distributed by: TriStar Pictures
- Release dates: May 18, 1998 (Madison Square Garden); May 20, 1998 (United States)
- Running time: 139 minutes
- Country: United States
- Language: English
- Budget: $125–150 million
- Box office: $379 million

Godzilla is a 1998 American monster film directed by Roland Emmerich, who co-wrote the screenplay with producer Dean Devlin. It is a reboot of Toho Co., Ltd.'s Godzilla franchise and the 23rd film in the franchise. (Note: It is the first Godzilla film to be completely produced by an American studio. The American releases of Godzilla (Godzilla, King of the Monsters!), King Kong vs. Godzilla, and The Return of Godzilla (Godzilla 1985) featured additional footage produced by American production companies. The footage featured Western actors and merged it with the original Japanese footage in order to appeal to American audiences. Invasion of Astro-Monster was the first Godzilla film to be co-produced between a Japanese studio (Toho Co., Ltd.) and an American studio (UPA).) The film stars Matthew Broderick, Jean Reno, Maria Pitillo, Hank Azaria, Kevin Dunn, Michael Lerner, and Harry Shearer. The film is dedicated to Tomoyuki Tanaka, the co-creator and producer of various Godzilla films, who died in April 1997. In the film, authorities investigate and battle a giant monster, known as Godzilla, who migrates to New York City to nest its young.

In October 1992, TriStar Pictures announced plans to produce a trilogy of Godzilla films. In May 1993, Ted Elliott and Terry Rossio were hired to write the script. In July 1994, Jan de Bont was announced as the director but left the project that December due to budget disputes. Emmerich was hired in May 1996 to direct and co-write a new script with Devlin. Principal photography began in May 1997 and ended in September 1997.

Godzilla premiered at Madison Square Garden in New York City, New York on May 18, 1998, and was released in the United States on May 20 by TriStar Pictures. The film received negative reviews from critics and grossed $379 million worldwide against a production budget between $130–150 million and marketing costs of $80 million, becoming the third highest-grossing film of 1998. Despite turning a profit, it was considered a box office disappointment. Planned sequels were cancelled, but an animated series was produced instead. TriStar let their remake/sequel rights expire on May 20, 2003.

In 2004, a new iteration of TriStar's Godzilla was featured in Toho's 2004 film Godzilla: Final Wars as "Zilla". That version has since appeared in various media under the "Zilla" trademark, but with the variants from the 1998 film and its animated sequel retaining the Godzilla copyright and trademark.

== Plot ==
An iguana nest is exposed to the fallout of a military nuclear test in French Polynesia. Years later, a Japanese cannery vessel in the South Pacific is attacked by an unknown giant creature, with one fisherman surviving. Recovering in a hospital in Tahiti, and questioned by a mysterious French visitor, the traumatized survivor repeatedly replies "Gojira".

NRC scientist Dr. Niko "Nick" Tatopoulos is researching the effects of radiation on wildlife in the Chernobyl exclusion zone, when he is interrupted by an official from the U.S. State Department. Nick is reassigned and sent to Panama and Jamaica to help the U.S. military investigate the destructive trail left by the creature. Nick identifies skin samples he discovered from a shipwreck as belonging to an unknown species. He dismisses the military's theory of the creature being a lost dinosaur, instead deducing it is a mutant created by nuclear testing in French Polynesia.

The creature drowns several fishing trawlers in the Eastern American Seaboard, and makes landfall in New York City, leaving a path of destruction. A city wide evacuation follows. On Nick's advice, the military set a trap with a large pile of fish to lure the creature into revealing itself. Their first attempt to kill the creature fails due to its enormous size and agility, causing further damage to the city before it escapes. Nick collects a blood sample and performs a pregnancy test, discovering that the creature reproduces asexually, and is about to lay eggs. Nick also meets up with his ex-girlfriend Audrey Timmonds, a young aspiring news reporter. Unnoticed by Nick, she uncovers a classified tape in his provisional tent concerning the monster's origins. She steals the tape, and turns it over to the media with the hope of launching her career. Her superior, Charles Caiman, steals her report, and dubs the creature "Godzilla".

Due to the tape's disclosure, Nick is removed from the operation, and he ends his relationship with Audrey. Nick's taxi is hijacked by the mysterious Frenchman, who identifies himself as Philippe Roaché, a French secret service agent. Audrey's friend and cameraman Victor "Animal" Palotti follows Nick's taxi to a warehouse, and eavesdrops on them. Philippe explains that he and his colleagues have been closely watching the events to cover up their country's role in the nuclear testing that created Godzilla. They suspect a nest somewhere in the city, cooperating with Nick to trace and destroy it. A guilt-ridden Audrey agrees to join Animal in following Nick and the Frenchmen, hoping to set things right with Nick. Godzilla resurfaces, and evades a second military strike. After diving into the Hudson River, it is attacked by Navy submarines. Godzilla sinks to the river bed, and is believed to be dead by the authorities.

Meanwhile, Nick and Philippe's team, followed by Audrey and Animal, find the nest inside Madison Square Garden. The eggs begin to hatch, and the emerging offsprings attack everyone on sight as they carry the scent of fish. Nick, Animal, Audrey, and Philippe take refuge in the Garden's broadcast booth, and successfully send a live news coverage to alert the military of the offsprings presence. A prompt airstrike is launched as the four escape moments before the Air Force bomb the arena.

Audrey and Nick reconcile before Godzilla emerges from the Garden's ruins, having survived the submarine attack. Enraged by the deaths of its young, it chases them across Manhattan. They manage to trap Godzilla within the suspension cables of the Brooklyn Bridge, allowing the returning jets to strike it down with missiles. Godzilla collapses and dies from its wounds, while the citizens and authorities celebrate its defeat. Having sabotaged her career, Audrey quits working for Caiman before leaving with Nick and Animal. Philippe slips away with Animal's tape, and promises to return it after removing the specific contents. He thanks Nick for his help, and parts ways.

In the ruins of Madison Square Garden, a single egg hatches. The hatchling roars to life, foreshadowing the continuation of Godzilla's lineage.

== Cast ==
- Matthew Broderick as Dr. Niko "Nick" Tatopoulos
- Jean Reno as Philippe Roaché
- Maria Pitillo as Audrey Timmonds
- Hank Azaria as Victor "Animal" Palotti
- Kevin Dunn as Colonel Hicks
- Michael Lerner as Mayor Ebert
- Harry Shearer as Charles Caiman
- Arabella Field as Lucy Palotti
- Vicki Lewis as Dr. Elsie Chapman
- Lorry Goldman as Gene
- Doug Savant as Sergeant O'Neal
- Malcolm Danare as Dr. Mendel Craven
- Ralph Manza as Fisherman Joe
- Glenn Morshower as Kyle Terrington
- Chris Ellis as General Hunter Anderson
- Richard Gant as Admiral Phelps
- Clyde Kusatsu as Japanese tanker skipper
- Nancy Cartwright as Caiman's secretary
- Frank Welker as Creature Vocal Effects
- Gary A. Hecker as Creature Vocal Effects
- Scott Martin Gershin as Creature Vocal Effects
- Kurt Carley as Godzilla (in-suit performance, uncredited)

== Production ==
=== Development ===
Stan Winston Studios' original Godzilla design for Jan de Bont's unproduced version

American film producer and distributor Henry G. Saperstein (who had co-produced and distributed past Godzilla films for the American market through his studio UPA) received permission from Toho Co., Ltd. (the owners of the Godzilla franchise) to pitch a new Godzilla film to Hollywood studios, stating, "For ten years I pressured Toho to make one in America. Finally they agreed." Saperstein initially met with Sony Pictures producers Cary Woods and Robert N. Fried for discussions regarding a live-action Mr. Magoo film but the discussions led to the availability of the rights to Godzilla.

Interested, Woods and Fried proposed the idea to Columbia Pictures (which had previously handled the North American release of Toho's Mothra), but were initially rejected. Woods stated, "We pitched the idea to Columbia and they passed outright. Their response was they felt it had the potential for camp". The two also tried to pitch the idea to TriStar Pictures but were also shot down, Fried stated, "TriStar did originally pass on the project. The people who were running the studio at that particular time may not have seen commercial potential there, may not have thought that it would make a great film."

Taking advice from his wife, Woods instead went over the executives' heads and proposed the idea to Peter Guber, the then-chairman of the board and CEO of Sony Pictures. Guber became enthusiastic about the idea, seeing Godzilla as an "international brand" and set the film up at TriStar. Woods recalled, "Peter got it; he saw the movie in his head. He was like, 'Godzilla, the fire-breathing monster?! Yesss!'" TriStar vice-chairman Ken Lemberger was sent to Tokyo to oversee the deal in obtaining the Godzilla rights from Toho in mid-1992. Sony's initial offer included a $300,000–400,000 advance payment with an annual licensing fee for the Godzilla character, as well as production bonuses, exclusive distribution and merchandising rights for Japan, a profit percentage from international ticket sales and merchandising, usage rights to some of the monsters from the first 15 Godzilla films, and allow Toho to continue producing domestic Godzilla films while TriStar developed their film. Subsequently, Toho sent Sony a document of rules on how to treat Godzilla. Robert Fried stated, "They even sent me a four-page, single-spaced memo describing the physical requirements the Godzilla in our film had to have. They're very protective."

In October 1992, TriStar formally announced their acquisition of the rights to Godzilla from Toho to produce a trilogy of Godzilla films, with the promise of "remaining true to the original series—cautioning against nuclear weapons and runaway technology." After TriStar's announcement, many of the original Godzilla filmmakers expressed support for the film; Haruo Nakajima (who portrayed Godzilla from 1954 to 1972) stated, "I'm pleased. I hope that a competition will spring up between Toho and TriStar," Koichi Kawakita (special effects director of the Heisei Godzilla films) stated, "I have great expectations. I'm looking forward to seeing it, not only because I direct special effects for Godzilla films but also because I am a movie fan," Teruyoshi Nakano (special effects director of the late Showa Godzilla films) stated, "I'm pleased that a new approach will be taken", and Ishirō Honda (director of various Showa Godzilla films) stated, "It will probably be much more interesting than the ones [currently] being produced in Japan."

In 1994, Jan de Bont became attached to direct and began pre-production on the film for a 1996 summer release. De Bont's Godzilla would have discarded the character's atomic origin and replaced it with one wherein Godzilla is an artificial creation constructed by Atlantians to defend humanity against a shape-shifting extraterrestrial monster called "The Gryphon". Stan Winston and his company were employed to do the effects for the film. Winston crafted sculptures of Godzilla and The Gryphon. De Bont later left the project in December 1994 after TriStar refused to approve his budget of $100–120 million. He would later go on to direct Twister and Speed 2: Cruise Control. Clive Barker and Tim Burton were also in talks to potentially direct.

=== Elliott and Rossio script ===
In May 1993, Ted Elliott and Terry Rossio were hired to write the screenplay. Prior to their hiring, Elliott and Rossio were searching for their next project and were offered Godzilla by their advisor Cary Woods. The duo initially declined the offer several times, Elliott recalled, "We actually turned the project down about two or three times because we weren't sure we knew what to do with it." Woods eventually convinced them to discuss the project with TriStar. Elliott and Rossio wrote a three and half-page story outline that secured their employment. Rossio believes that they were offered the project due to their experience in writing "franchise-type titles." Robert Fried expressed support for Elliott and Rossio, praising them as "talented sci-fi buffs" and stating, "We've put a lot of time, thought and finance into the screenplay." Toho's character restrictions helped inspire Elliott and Rossio in finding the tone of the script, Elliott stated, "Toho insisted we not make light of the monster. That helped us find the right tone as well as the social and political implications."

The duo wanted to avoid a comic-like approach and instead take the material seriously with a "legitimate science fiction story" that would evoke feelings of "mystified or scared or awe-inspired" for audiences. Rossio wanted to create a balance in anthropomorphizing Godzilla, not wanting to stray from Godzilla's humanistic personality but not humanize him entirely. The duo approached Godzilla as something that audiences would fear yet root for. Elliott found the "key" to the story after a friend, who was also a Godzilla fan, expressed that he found Godzilla not to be a "good guy", but a territorial beast, Elliott stated, "And that, to me, meant that you could actually present Godzilla on the side of the angels but he could still be a monster."

The duo chose to add small details to make Godzilla seem "more realistic", such as the nictitating membrane. The duo took inspiration from Moby-Dick for the story concept. As the story developed, they found that the Ahab archetype would be more interesting if it were a woman who lost her husband to Godzilla. Elliott described the story to be about obsession, redemption and "inappropriate grief response." The duo also wanted to deliver a story that satisfied fans by adapting Godzilla's characterization from the first few Toho films, Elliott stated, "In one movie it does what the first three Toho films did – it takes him from being a horrendous threat to being defender of the Earth." Elliott and Rossio submitted their first draft on November 10, 1993. Woods and Fried were satisfied with the script, with Fried praising it for being "respectful of the organic origins of Godzilla, in some ways a homage to US-Japanese relations."

After De Bont joined the project, Elliott and Rossio revised the script based on his notes. Amongst the changes made to the first draft were the 12-year gap condensed to a year; Jill accompanies Keith to the Arctic site; Keith first notices Godzilla's teeth buried in ice instead of his claws; The alien probe crashes in Traveller, Utah instead of Kentucky. Elliott and Rossio remained on the project after De Bont left and completed their final rewrites in spring 1995. Prior to hiring a new director, TriStar hired Don Macpherson to rewrite the Elliott/Rossio script. Prior to his hiring, Macpherson was working on Possession until he received a call from his agent with an offer to work on Godzilla. Macpherson "immediately accepted" due to being a fan of the Toho Godzilla films.

Macpherson met with Marc Platt, the then-President of TriStar, to discuss the film. The studio was concerned with the film's proposed $120 million budget, later revised to $200 million. De Bont insisted that all of the film's effects be entirely digital, Macpherson noted, "The problem was that, in this version of the movie, it was all effects. Godzilla was in virtually every scene. So everything was an SFX scene." Macpherson was tasked with rewriting the script to match TriStar's "ideal" budget of $80 million. Prior to rewriting the script, he requested to meet with the production crew to pinpoint which scenes were deemed the most expensive. The production crew reported that the three main problems that were considered "difficult and costly" were Godzilla's size, Godzilla's interaction with water, and Godzilla's interaction with masonry.

Macpherson was shown storyboards, concept art, and designs from De Bont's version. However, he did not keep these ideas in mind, feeling that such elements would change depending on the budget. Instead, Macpherson used the Toho Godzilla design as a reference when rewriting the script. He noted that the project had transitioned into a film that turned directors away, stating, "they said they wanted strong, creative directors. But they wanted them as a kind of 'badge' of creative excitement and had no intention of allowing them their freedom."

While Macpherson called Elliott and Rossio's original script "terrific," he took issue with several of its ideas. He felt that the script discarded the "Japanese element of post-war nuclear politics" from the Toho films, leaving Godzilla as a threat to a single country rather than the world, Macpherson added, "That neglected the poetic aspect of fear and wonder from the original Toho movies, and the idea of a prior 'sin' which had caused the mutation and revenge of Godzilla." He felt that the script lacked proper characters and "had too many extra sequences which didn't deliver." He also took issue that the script never developed Godzilla as a character and treated him similar to The Terminator, though he suspected De Bont was responsible for this portrayal.

Macpherson felt that the script's depiction of Godzilla was "relentless", noting, "very much a Godzilla POV, so you neither identified with Godzilla nor with the scientists trying to protect the world." He also took issue that the first half of the script was driven by destruction and by the script's mid-point, there was "monster fatigue" and no "encore," stating, "So I thought the audience would be fatigued and ready for something new – and the new thing wasn't delivered." Macpherson attempted to resolve that issue while retaining the highlights of Elliott and Rossio's script.

In November 2018, an unofficial digital graphic novel adaptation of Elliott and Rossio's unproduced Godzilla script was released online. Entitled Godzilla '94, the graphic novel features artwork by Todd Tennant, who worked with Rossio on the project.

=== Emmerich and Devlin ===
Prior to the release of Independence Day, director Roland Emmerich and producer Dean Devlin signed on to the project in May 1996 under the condition they would be able to handle the film their way, Devlin stated, "I told Sony that I would do the film but on my own terms, with Godzilla as a fast-moving animal out of nature, rather than some strange kind of creature." Emmerich and Devlin were the first filmmakers approached by then-TriStar executive Chris Lee to do Godzilla but initially turned the offer down, Devlin stated, "Both of us thought it was a dopey idea the first time we talked. When Chris came back to us, we still thought it was a dopey idea."

Despite praising Elliott and Rossio's script, Emmerich discarded it, stating, "It had some really cool things in it, but it is something I never would have done. The last half was like watching two creatures go at it. I simply don't like that." Emmerich instead decided to develop new ideas from scratch, stating, "I didn't want to make the original Godzilla, I wanted nothing to do with it. I wanted to make my own. We took part of [the original movie's] basic storyline, in that the creature becomes created by radiation and it becomes a big challenge. But that's all we took. Then we asked ourselves what we would do today with a monster movie and a story like that. We forgot everything about the original Godzilla right there."

==== Creature design ====
Tatopoulos showed this concept drawing (his personal favorite) to Emmerich and Devlin at Cannes 1996, which convinced them to move forward with the project.

Emmerich decided to completely reinvent Godzilla's design because he thought the original Toho design "didn't make sense". Emmerich also discarded the previous design approved by Jan de Bont, stating, "I saw the creature that they designed for [TriStar's first attempt]. Jan De Bont created a Godzilla that was very close to the original, but it was not right because today we wouldn't do it like that."

Patrick Tatopoulos was hired by Emmerich to design Godzilla. According to Tatopoulos, the only specific instructions Emmerich gave him was that it should be able to run incredibly fast. Godzilla, originally conceived as a robust, erect-standing, plantigrade reptilian sea monster, was reimagined by Tatopoulos as a lean, digitigrade bipedal iguana-like creature that stood with its back and tail parallel to the ground. Godzilla's color scheme was designed to reflect and blend in with the urban environment. At one point, it was planned to use motion capture from a human to create the movements of the computer-generated Godzilla, but it ended up looking too much like a human in a suit.

Tatopoulos thought the designs that Ricardo Delgado, Crash McCreery and Joey Orosco provided for Jan de Bont took the design in a wrong approach, stating, "What they did which was a mistake in my mind was, rather than going in a new direction they tried to alter and make the old one better. And when you do that, first of all I think it's very disrespectful. It's more disrespectful for me to alter something existing than to take a fresh new direction." Tatopoulos took inspiration from the design of Shere Khan used in Disney's version of The Jungle Book in terms of Godzilla's chin, stating, "One of the inspirations was a character I loved as a kid, the tiger in Jungle Book, Shere Khan. He had this great chin thing and I always loved it; he looked scary, evil but you respected him. I thought, let's try to give him a chin and I felt it still looked realistic but he had this different thing that you hadn't seen before."

Tatopoulos created four concept art pieces and a 2-foot tall maquette for a meeting with Toho. Tatopoulos and Emmerich attended the meeting to pitch their Godzilla to then Toho chairman Isao Matsuoka, Godzilla film producer Shogo Tomiyama, and Godzilla special effects director Koichi Kawakita. They unveiled Tatopoulos' artwork and maquette and the Toho trio remained silent for a few minutes, Emmerich recalled, "They were speechless, they stared at it, and there was silence for a couple minutes, and then they said, 'Could you come back tomorrow?' I thought for sure we didn't have the movie then." Tomiyama later recalled that "It was so different we realized we couldn't make small adjustments. That left the major question of whether to approve it or not." Even though Tomiyama was not allowed to remove the artwork and maquette from the studio premise, Tomiyama visited Godzilla producer and creator Tomoyuki Tanaka, whose failing health prevented him from attending the meeting, to explain Tatopoulos' design, stating, "I told him, 'It's similar to Carl Lewis, with long legs, and it runs fast'." The following morning, Matsuoka approved the design, stating that Tatopoulos "kept the spirit of Godzilla."

==== Writing ====
Despite receiving approval from Toho, TriStar had yet to green-light the film. Emmerich and Devlin wrote the script on spec, with the condition that the screenplay would return to the filmmakers if the studio did not immediately approve it. Emmerich and Devlin wrote the first draft in five and a half weeks at Emmerich's vacation house in Puerto Vallarta, Mexico. Emmerich and Devlin decided to abandon the Atlantis origin established in Elliott and Rossio's script in favor of the radiation origin established in the Toho films, Devlin stated, "In some of the early drafts of the script by others, they had Godzilla being an alien planted here. What Japan had originally come up with regarding nuclear radiation – you can't abandon that. It's too important to what Godzilla is all about." Emmerich and Devlin also decided to treat their Godzilla more animal-like than monstrous, Tatopoulos stated, "We were creating an animal. We weren't creating a monster." Emmerich and Devlin also decided to give their Godzilla the ability to burrow underground, Devlin stated, "We discovered that certain kinds of lizards can burrow, so we decided to give him that capability." Chameleon-like skin change was also considered but abandoned later during production.

Emmerich and Devlin also abandoned Godzilla's iconic atomic breath in favor of a "power breath", where their Godzilla would simply blow objects away by exhaling a strong wind-like breath. However, news of the power breath leaked before the film's release, which outraged fans and forced Emmerich and Devlin to make last minute changes on scenes involving the power breath, effects supervisor Volker Engel stated, "Dean and Roland wanted this monster to retain a certain menace and credibility, but Godzilla's breath is something everyone expects to see at some point, so they came up with instances in which you would see something like the old breath, but with a kind of logic applied to it. We make the assumption that something in his breath, when it comes in contact with flame, causes combustive ignition. So you get this flame-thrower effect, which causes everything to ignite." As a way to make their Godzilla a threat to mankind, Emmerich and Devlin also gave their Godzilla the ability to lay hundreds of eggs (via parthenogenesis) and rapidly spawn offspring that could spawn offspring of their own and quickly overrun the planet. The first draft was submitted to Sony on December 19, 1996, then-President of Sony Pictures John Calley forwarded the script to Bob Levin of marketing to brainstorm marketing ideas.

==== Pre-production ====
TriStar green-lit the film soon after Emmerich and Devlin's completion of the first draft, bestowing complete creative freedom to write, produce, and direct on the filmmakers, while the studio managed financing, distribution and merchandising deals. The deal also enabled Emmerich and Devlin to receive 15% first-dollar gross on the film while the original producers Cary Woods and Robert Fried would be given executive producer credits. Instead of employing Digital Domain as Jan de Bont planned for his Godzilla, Emmerich and Devlin decided to use their own effects team such as visual effects division Centropolis Effects as the lead effects vendor, Volker Engel as the film's visual effects supervisor, Joe Viskocil as miniature effects supervisor, Clay Pinney as mechanical effects supervisor, and William Fay as executive producer of the team.

Viewpoint DataLabs created a digital model of Godzilla, nicknamed "Fred", for scenes that required a digital rendition of the monster. For scenes that required practical effects, Tatopoulos' studio created a 6th-scale animatronic model of Godzilla's upper-body as well as a 24th-scale Godzilla suit donned by stuntman Kurt Carley. The filmmakers favored CG over practical effects and as a result, the final film features 400 digital shots, 185 of which feature Godzilla, and only two dozen practical effects used in the final film.

==== Filming ====
Principal photography began on May 1, 1997 and wrapped on September 26, 1997. Filming took place in New York City and moved to Los Angeles in June. Scenes in New York were filmed in 13 days; tropical scenes were filmed in the Hawaiian Islands. The United States Marine Corps participated in the filming of the movie. An F-18 Marine Reserve pilot, Col. Dwight Schmidt, actually piloted the plane that "fired" the missiles that killed Godzilla.

== Music ==
The soundtrack, featuring alternative rock music, was released on May 19, 1998, by Epic Records. It was a success on the music charts, peaking at number 2 on the Billboard 200 and was certified platinum on June 22, 1998. The original score was composed by David Arnold. The film's score was not released on CD until 9 years later, when it went on sale as a complete original film score in 2007 by La La Land Records. The album was supported by the single "Come with Me" performed by Sean Combs and Jimmy Page.

== Release ==
=== Marketing ===
Bob Levin, chief of marketing for the film, was caught by surprise when Emmerich insisted not to use full body images or head shots of Godzilla during the marketing, Levin stated, "we got indications from them that they really didn't think that the full figure Godzilla should be at all exposed prior to the release of the film. While initially we reacted negatively to that, once we understood their thinking behind it, it became completely acceptable to us." 300 companies signed an agreement not to show the full image of Godzilla before the film's release. Prior to principal photography, Emmerich filmed a teaser trailer, budgeted at $600,000, that featured Godzilla's foot crushing the skeleton of a Tyrannosaurus Rex at a museum. The trailer was attached to screenings of Men in Black and received an overwhelmingly enthusiastic response from audiences. Afterwards, select theaters began advertising that the trailer would be featured before Men in Black. A new trailer later premiered on November 7, 1997, with the release of Starship Troopers.

Taco Bell contributed to the marketing of the film with $20 million in media support. The marketing campaign featured commercials of the Taco Bell chihuahua attempting to trap the monster in a box or riding on the monster's tail and making an order for two. Trendmasters manufactured the toys for the film, including the 11-inch tall "Living Godzilla" and the 21-inch tall "Ultimate Godzilla". However, poor merchandise sales for the film led to a cancellation of a toyline based on the animated series. Robert Fried had estimated that $80 million was spent on marketing worldwide.

=== Home media ===
On November 3, 1998, the film was released on VHS and DVD in the United States. Special features for the DVD include: photo galleries, visual effects and special FX supervisor commentaries, the music video for "Heroes" by The Wallflowers, Behind the Scenes of Godzilla with Charles Caiman, theatrical trailers, a featurette, director/producer and cast biographies, a photo gallery, music video, and Godzilla Takes New York (before and after shots). In 1999, Sony released a Widescreen Edition VHS. The VHS earned $8.04 million from rentals during its first week in the United States, at the time making it the biggest video opening since Titanic. The DVD sold over 400,000 units in the United States by the end of 1998. It was also reported that NBC would pay around $25 million for the television broadcast rights in the United States.

On December 13, 2005, the film was released on Universal Media Disc. On March 28, 2006, Sony released a special "monster" edition DVD that retained the previous DVD's special features, as well as an "All-Time Best of Godzilla Fight Scenes" featurette, 3 episodes from Godzilla: The Series, and a "never-before-seen" production art gallery. On November 10, 2009, the film was released on Blu-ray, which retained the special features from the second DVD release, sans the animated series episodes. On July 16, 2013, Sony released a "Mastered in 4K" Blu-ray edition. On May 14, 2019, the film was released on Ultra HD Blu-ray. This release retained the same special features from the initial Blu-ray release, as well as a new Dolby Atmos audio mix.

== Reception ==
=== Box office ===
The Wall Street Journal reported that the film would need to gross $240 million domestically in order to be considered a success. Godzilla was released in the United States and Canada on May 20, 1998, in a record 3,310 theaters. Sony expected the film to gross $100 million during the film's opening weekend, which fell on Memorial Day weekend, expecting to set a new record for the holiday. Ultimately, it would only end up earning $12.5 million on opening day and grossing $44 million during its opening weekend. The film grossed $55,726,951 over the four day holiday weekend, and $74.3 million in its first six days, falling below industry expectations. Its six-day opening gross nevertheless came close to the $74.9 million Memorial Day weekend record previously set by Mission: Impossible in 1996, but fell below the $90 million record set by The Lost World: Jurassic Park in 1997.

The film's revenue dropped by 59% in its second week of release, earning $18,020,444. For that particular weekend, the film remained in first place as the romantic drama Hope Floats overtook Deep Impact for second place with $14,210,464 in box office business. During its final week in North America, the film was in 19th place, grossing $202,157. For that weekend, Lethal Weapon 4 made its debut, opening in first place with $34,048,124 in revenue. The film went on to top out domestically at $136,314,294 in total ticket sales through an eight-week theatrical run (equivalent to $230 million adjusted for ticket inflation in 2013).

Internationally, the film took in an additional $242.7 million in business, for a combined worldwide total of $379,014,294 (equivalent to $633 million adjusted for ticket inflation in 2013). For 1998 as a whole, the film was the ninth highest-grossing film domestically and the third highest-grossing film worldwide. Despite performing below expectations domestically, Godzilla was a profitable worldwide success, grossing nearly three times its budget. Sony stated that retail sales of consumer products generated $400 million; not only from the 1998 film but from the animated series and the Heisei Godzilla films that Sony acquired at the time.

=== Critical response ===
Godzilla received generally negative reviews from critics. On the review aggregator website Rotten Tomatoes, 19% of 146 critics' reviews are positive, with an average rating of 4.5/10. The website's consensus reads: "Without compelling characters or heart, Godzilla stomps on everything that made the original (or any monster movie worth its salt) a classic." Metacritic, which uses a weighted average, assigned the film a score of 32 out of 100, based on 23 critics, indicating "generally unfavorable" reviews. Audiences surveyed by CinemaScore gave the film an average grade of "B−" on an A+ to F scale. Criticism highlighted by film critics included the film's script, acting, and directing, while fans targeted the film's reinvention of Godzilla, which included its redesign and departure from the source material. (Note: Attributed to multiple references:)

Roger Ebert from the Chicago Sun-Times gave the film one-and-a-half stars out of four, noting that "One must carefully repress intelligent thought while watching such a film. The movie makes no sense at all except as a careless pastiche of its betters (and, yes, the Japanese Godzilla movies are, in their way, better—if only because they embrace dreck instead of condescending to it). You have to absorb such a film, not consider it. But my brain rebelled, and insisted on applying logic where it was not welcome." Ebert also pointed out in his review that the characters Mayor Ebert and his assistant Gene were Devlin and Emmerich's jabs at his and Gene Siskel's negative reviews of Stargate and Independence Day. Gene Siskel particularly singled out this aspect, writing "why place us in the movie if you aren't going to have us be eaten or squashed by the monster?" Siskel placed the film on his list of the worst films of 1998. James Berardinelli from ReelViews, called the film "one of the most idiotic blockbuster movies of all time, it's like spitting into the wind. Emmerich and Devlin are master illusionists, waving their wands and mesmerizing audiences with their smoke and mirrors. It's probably too much to hope that some day, movie-goers will wake up and realize that they've been had." Stephen Holden of The New York Times wrote that the film "is so clumsily structured it feels as if it's two different movies stuck together with an absurd stomping finale glued onto the end. The only question worth asking about this $120 million wad of popcorn is a commercial one. How much further will the dumbing down of the event movie have to go before the audience stops buying tickets?"

Michael O'Sullivan of The Washington Post queried, "The question is this: Are the awe-inspiring creature effects and roaring battle scenes impressive enough to make you forget the stupid story, inaccurate science and basic implausibility?" He added, "The cut-rate cast seems to have been plucked from the pages of TV Guide. There's Doug Savant from Melrose Place as O'Neal, a scaredy-cat military man who looks like Sgt. Rock and acts like Barney Fife. There's Maria Pitillo (House Rules) as Nick's soporific love interest, Audrey; The Simpsons' Hank Azaria and Harry Shearer as a wise-cracking news cameraman and superficial reporter; Vicki Lewis of NewsRadio as a lusty scientist. Shall I continue?" Owen Gleiberman writing for Entertainment Weekly thought "There's no resonance to the new Godzilla, and no built-in cheese value, either. For a while, the filmmakers honor the sentimental paradox that seeped into the later Godzilla films: that this primitive destroyer, like King Kong, doesn't actually mean any harm." He opined that the film contained "some clever and exciting sequences", but ultimately came to the conclusion that, "It says much about today's blockbuster filmmakers that they could spend so much money on Godzilla and still fail to do justice to something that was fairy-tale destructo schlock to begin with."

=== Response from crew ===
"I didn't want to do Godzilla. But they made me a deal, which was unheard of. I said, 'OK, let's go about this really radically. I'm not doing big-belly Godzilla. I'm doing him as a lizard.' That was supposed to tell everybody I can't do this movie. [Godzilla owner Toho] said, 'Oh, we'll call this the new Godzilla, the Hollywood Godzilla. Then, we can still do our fat Godzilla.' I said, 'Shit!'"

— Emmerich reflecting on the film in 2022.

Emmerich later admitted regretting the film's production, particularly due to the rushed shooting schedule that was required for a Memorial Day weekend release and the studio's insistence on not test-screening the film. However, he defended the film as better than critics gave it credit for, as it was financially successful, and said that his friends told him it is a favorite amongst their kids. Emmerich also conceded that he never took the Toho films seriously, stating, "I was never a big Godzilla fan, they were just the weekend matinees you saw as a kid, like Hercules films and the really bad Italian westerns. You'd go with all your friends and just laugh."

In later years, Devlin stated that he "screwed up" his Godzilla, mainly blaming the script that he co-wrote with Emmerich as the source of the film's failure. Devlin additionally emphasized "two flaws" that he believed hurt the film, stating, "The first is we did not commit to anthropomorphizing Godzilla – meaning we did not decide if he was a heroic character, or a villainous character. We made the intellectual decision to have him be neither and just simply an animal trying to survive." Devlin said the decision was a "big mistake" and revealed the second flaw of the film was "...deciding to exposit the characters' background in the middle of the film rather than in the first act (where we always do). At the time we told the audience who these characters were, they had already made their minds up about them and we could not change that perception". Devlin concluded by stating, "These were 2 serious mistakes in the writing of the film, and I take full responsibility."

During a 2016 interview on Gilbert Gottfried's Amazing Colossal Podcast!, Broderick maintained that he liked the film. Apart from suggesting he may have been miscast, he admitted to failing to understand the film's poor reputation, given that it made "a lot of money" and was the result of a large group of people's hard work. He also described Roland Emmerich as "a very good friend."

Rob Fried, who helped acquire the rights for TriStar, was angered how the studio handled the property, stating, "The Sony executive team that took over Godzilla was one of the worst cases of executive incompetence I have observed in my twenty-year career. One of the golden assets of our time, which was hand-delivered to them, was managed as poorly and ineptly as anybody can manage an asset. They took a jewel and turned it into dust."

In 2018, Azaria expressed his disappointment with working on Godzilla, citing its failure to boost his career profile as intended, and noting that he fell sick several times while shooting in rainy exteriors for five months. He went on to declare that Godzilla became the "poster child" for everything wrong with Hollywood in terms of budget and marketing, adding that the advertisements looked better than the film itself.

=== Response from Toho ===
Toho's trademark icon for Zilla. Since its 2004 appearance in Toho's Godzilla: Final Wars, the character has appeared in various media under the "Zilla" trademark.

Veteran Godzilla actors Haruo Nakajima and Kenpachiro Satsuma, as well as Shusuke Kaneko (who would later direct Godzilla, Mothra and King Ghidorah: Giant Monsters All-Out Attack), were also critical of the film and its character. Nakajima stated "its face looks like an iguana and its body and limbs look like a frog". Satsuma walked out of a screening of the film at fan convention G-Con '98 in Chicago, stating, "it's not Godzilla, it doesn't have his spirit". Toho publicist Yosuke Ogura later called TriStar's design a "disaster."

TriStar's Godzilla was considered so different that the term GINO (Godzilla In Name Only) was coined by critic and Godzilla fan Richard Pusateri to distinguish the character apart from Toho's Godzilla. Kaneko pondered on the treatment the character was given by the studio, stating, "It is interesting [that] the US version of Godzilla runs about trying to escape missiles... Americans seem unable to accept a creature that cannot be put down by their arms." Nicholas Raymond from Screen Rant described Toho's subsequent treatment of TriStar's Godzilla as "a clear sign that Toho doesn't regard the 1998 Godzilla as the King of the Monsters. It would appear that to them, he's just a giant lizard."

Jun Fukuda, director of five Godzilla films, expressed understanding regarding the film, stating, "It was made in America, so it's only natural that it's different from the Japanese Godzilla films." While praising the trailer as "interesting," he criticized the screenplay, saying that "the story falls apart for a Godzilla film" and that as Godzilla begins to move, it becomes a story that seems familiar."

In 2004, a new iteration of TriStar's Godzilla was featured in Toho's 2004 film Godzilla: Final Wars as "Zilla". Producer Shōgo Tomiyama and director Ryuhei Kitamura said the name was chosen because they felt Emmerich's film "took the God out of Godzilla" by portraying the character like a mere animal. Tomiyama also said that the name was a satirical take on counterfeit Godzilla products that use "Zilla" as a suffix. That incarnation of the TriStar's Godzilla has since appeared in various media under the "Zilla" trademark. However, the variants appearing in the 1998 film and Godzilla: The Series continue to use the "Godzilla" copyright and trademark.

In 2024, filmmaker Takashi Yamazaki, director and writer of Toho's 2023 film Godzilla Minus One, spoke favorably of the 1998 film. He felt that on its own merits, the 1998 film is "fun" and "quite well executed" and was technologically a huge achievement but understood why some are hesitant to consider it part of the franchise. Yamazaki also refuted the misconception that the 1998 film was allegedly responsible for the franchise's box office decline in Japan, stating "it had been in decline for years" by the time that the 1998 film was released.

=== Accolades ===
The film was nominated and won several awards in 1998–99. Furthermore, it was screened out of competition at the 1998 Cannes Film Festival. Godzilla would later rank in the listed bottom 20 of the Stinkers' "100 Years, 100 Stinkers" list, which noted the 100 worst movies of the 20th century, at #18.

Award	Category	Nominee	Result
19th Golden Raspberry Awards	Worst Picture	TriStar Pictures	Nominated
19th Golden Raspberry Awards	Worst Supporting Actress	Maria Pitillo	Won
19th Golden Raspberry Awards	Worst Remake or Sequel	TriStar Pictures	Won (Note: Tied with Psycho and The Avengers. It is the only three-way tie in the show's history.)
19th Golden Raspberry Awards	Worst Director	Roland Emmerich	Nominated
19th Golden Raspberry Awards	Worst Screenplay	Roland Emmerich and Dean Devlin	Nominated
19th Golden Raspberry Awards	Worst Movie Trends of the Year	TriStar Pictures	Nominated
11th European Film Awards	People's Choice Award	Roland Emmerich	Won
International Film Music Critics Association	Best New Release, Re-Release or Re-Recording of an Existing Score	David Arnold, Ford A. Thaxton, and Dan Goldwasser	Nominated
International Film Music Critics Association	Best Original Score for a Fantasy/Science Fiction Film	David Arnold	Nominated
25th Saturn Awards	Best Special Effects	Volker Engel, Patrick Tatopoulos, Karen E. Goulekas, Clay Pinney	Won
25th Saturn Awards	Best Director	Roland Emmerich	Nominated
25th Saturn Awards	Best Fantasy Film	Godzilla	Nominated
26th Annie Awards	Outstanding Individual Achievement for Effects Animation	Jerome Chen	Nominated
1998 MTV Video Music Awards	Best Video from a Film	Puff Daddy (featuring Jimmy Page) – "Come with Me"	Nominated
BMI Film & TV Awards 1999	BMI Film Music Award	David Arnold	Won
Blockbuster Entertainment Award 1999	Favorite Song	Sean Combs ("Come with Me")	Nominated
Bogey Awards for 1998	Bogey Award in Silver	————	Won
California On Location Awards 1998	Location Team of the Year – Feature	————	Won
1998 Stinkers Bad Movie Awards	Worst Screenplay for a Film Grossing More Than $100 Million (Using Hollywood Math)	TriStar Pictures	Won
1998 Stinkers Bad Movie Awards	Worst Song in a Motion Picture	"Come with Me" (Puff Daddy with Jimmy Page)	Won

== Post-release ==
=== Cancelled trilogy ===
TriStar planned to produce a Godzilla trilogy upon acquiring the Godzilla license in 1992. Emmerich had considered using the Monster Island concept from the Toho films with the intention of creating something wild, as well as including six or seven monsters, stating, "We'll probably come up with other monsters because we don't want to tie ourselves too much to certain things". Prior to the 1998 film's release, Sony felt confident enough with the potential box office success that they paid Toho $5 million for sequel rights, which guaranteed them to produce a sequel within five years following the first film's release, so long as it was in active development. Devlin had confirmed plans for a trilogy, stating, "We have a Godzilla trilogy in mind. The second one is remarkably different from the first one, and if it's embraced, a third one would make a whole lot of sense. I don't see us doing more than three, but I would love to finish out telling the story."

Emmerich and Devlin commissioned a treatment by Tab Murphy titled Godzilla 2. The sequel would have involved the surviving offspring battling a giant insect in Sydney. The studio abandoned sequel plans due to a lack of enthusiasm from fans, audiences, theater owners and licensees, and Emmerich and Devlin left due to budget disputes. Devlin stated, "They wanted to tailor it budget-wise, so it didn't make sense for us creatively." Devlin stated that they left the film with an open-ending in case the success allowed them to return for sequels. Despite Emmerich's comments that Sony was "absolutely ready" to produce a sequel, he later revealed that he advised the studio to not produce a sequel, stating, "It's so strange because people expected it to be the biggest thing ever, then it only did well. They are disappointed, and you have to defend yourself". Sony had considered a reboot with the new series disassociating itself from the 1998 film. However, TriStar let their remake/sequel rights expire on May 20, 2003.

=== Animated series ===
An animated series was produced as a sequel and aired on Fox Kids from 1998 to 2000. In the series, Dr. Niko "Nick" Tatopoulos accidentally discovers the egg that survived the aerial bombardment before it hatches, in a minor change from the ending in the 1998 film. The new Godzilla hatches after Nick stumbles onto it and it assumes him to be its parent. Subsequently, Nick and his associates form a research team, investigating strange occurrences and defending mankind from dangerous mutations with Godzilla, which grew to full size in a few days, serving as humanity's protector from the new threats.

=== Reboots ===
In 1999, Toho rebooted the Japanese series with Godzilla 2000, launching the franchise's Millennium series. Toho originally planned to revive the series in 2005 to commemorate the franchise's 50th anniversary. However, Toho chose to revive the series early due to popular demand, producer Shogo Tomiyama stated, "The shape of the American version of Godzilla was so different from the Japanese version that there was a clamor among fans and company officials to create a Godzilla unique to Japan."

Director Ryuhei Kitamura said he initially wanted to cast Reno in Godzilla: Final Wars, potentially reprising his role. Mixed martial arts fighter Don Frye instead appeared as a new character, Capt. Douglas Gordon.

In 2014, Legendary Pictures and Warner Bros. Pictures released their own Hollywood reboot of the same name. Producer Thomas Tull was adamant about keeping their Godzilla design consistent with the Toho version and expressed puzzlement as to why the crew behind TriStar's Godzilla drastically changed the design to the point that it was "unrecognizable." The film generated its own sequels that expanded into a shared-universe franchise titled the Monsterverse.
