= Shahrak-e Dilzeh Makan Mastaqol =

Shahrak-e Dilzeh Makan Mastaqol شهرك ديلزه مكان مستقل
- Village
- Country: Iran
- Province: West Azerbaijan
- County: Piranshahr
- Bakhsh: Central
- Rural District: Piran

Population (2006)
  - Total: 258
- Time zone: UTC+3:30 (IRST)
  - Summer (DST): UTC+4:30 (IRDT)

Shahrak-e Dilzeh Makan Mastaqol (Persian: شهرك ديلزه مكان مستقل, also Romanized as Shahrak-e Dīlzeh Makān Mastaqol) is a village in Piran Rural District, in the Central District of Piranshahr County, West Azerbaijan Province, Iran. At the 2006 census, its population was 258, in 45 families.
