= Chianeh =

Chianeh or Chiyana (Persian: چيانه) may refer to:

- Chianeh, Naqadeh
- Chianeh, Piranshahr
