= Zira, Iran =

Zira (Persian: زيرا) may refer to:

- Zira, Bushehr
- Zira, West Azerbaijan
