= Kalehkin =

Village in West Azerbaijan province, Iran

Kalehkin Persian: كله كين
- Village
- Location within Iran
- Coordinates: 36°44′19″N 45°08′06″E
- Country: Iran
- Province: West Azerbaijan
- County: Piranshahr
- District: Central
- Rural District: Piran

Population (2016)
  - Total: 914
- Time zone: UTC+3:30 (IRST)

Kalehkin (Persian: كله كين) (Note: Also romanized as Kalehkīn; also known as Gelekin) is a village in Piran Rural District of the Central District in Piranshahr County, West Azerbaijan province, Iran.

== Demographics ==
=== Population ===
At the time of the 2006 National Census, the village's population was 808 in 140 households. The following census in 2011 counted 931 people in 219 households. The 2016 census measured the population of the village as 914 people in 219 households.
