= Badinabad-e Piran =

Village in West Azerbaijan province, Iran

Badinabad-e Piran Persian: بادين ابادپيران
- Village
- Location within Iran
- Coordinates: 36°34′49″N 45°10′53″E
- Country: Iran
- Province: West Azerbaijan
- County: Piranshahr
- District: Central
- Rural District: Piran

Population (2016)
  - Total: 440
- Time zone: UTC+3:30 (IRST)

Badinabad-e Piran (Persian: بادين ابادپيران) (Note: Also romanized as Bādīnābād Pīrān and Badīnābād-e Pirān; also known as Badinaba, Bādīnābād, and Bādīnābād-e Pā'īn) is a village in Piran Rural District of the Central District in Piranshahr County, West Azerbaijan province, Iran.

== Demographics ==
=== Population ===
At the time of the 2006 National Census, the village's population was 518 in 84 households. The following census in 2011 counted 479 people in 101 households. The 2016 census measured the population of the village as 440 people in 105 households.
