= Maki Mizuno =

Japanese actress

- 水野 真紀
- Born: Yuki Enowaki; 28 March 1970 (age 56); Tokyo, Japan
- Other name: Yuki Gotoda (married name)
- Occupation: Actress
- Years active: 1987–present
- Agent: Toho Entertainment
- Notable credit: Godzilla: Final Wars
- Spouse: Masazumi Gotoda (m. 2004)
- Children: 1

Maki Mizuno (水野 真紀, Mizuno Maki; real name Yuki Gotoda (後藤田 由紀, Gotōda Yuki), born as Yuki Enowaki (江野脇 由紀, Enowaki Yuki) on 28 March 1970) is a Japanese actress. She has appeared in jidaigeki and contemporary dramas. She has also appeared in the 2004 Godzilla movie Godzilla: Final Wars.

== Life and career ==
Maki Mizuno was born Yuki Enowaki, in Tokyo. After attending the Junior and Senior High School attached to the Faculty of Education at the University of Tokyo, she graduated from Toyo Eiwa Jogakuin Junior College in 1990. After transferring to the University of the Sacred Heart, she graduated from the Department of Education, Faculty of Contemporary Liberal Arts, at the University of the Sacred Heart in 2021. She also studied abroad at Le Cordon Bleu London for a short period and graduated from Hattori Nutrition College. She holds a kindergarten teacher's license, a childcare worker qualification, and a chef's license.

In 1987, while in her second year of high school, she won the judges' special award at the 2nd "Toho Cinderella Contest" . She was feeling down after being treated coldly by a boy she liked at the time, when her older sister found the contest's application information in the newspaper. She impulsively applied. In 1990, she made her entertainment debut in the NHK morning drama series Rinrinto. While attending junior college in 1989, she played the heroine in the film Winter Story. The following year, in 1990, she graduated from junior college and in 1992 played the heroine in the morning drama series Papakko-chan (Yomiuri TV).

She is known for being the first "Beautiful Older Sister "character in a commercial for Matsushita Electric Works (now Panasonic Electric Works), and was chosen as the top actress among potential brides in 1996, the year she appeared in the commercial.

She also has her own TV show, "Maki Mizuno's Magical Restaurant" (MBS), which has been airing since 2001. She said that it was only after she started hosting the show that she tried okonomiyaki (a flour-based dish) for the first time. She has also appeared in a commercial for Osaka Gas, so although she is originally from Tokyo, she has a connection to the Kansai region.

In March 2004, she married, Masazumi Gotoda, her friend from university. She gave birth to her only child, a son, at Aiiku Hospital in April 2005.

In June 2023, she was appointed as an outside director of JP Holdings, which operates nursery schools.

== Filmography ==
=== Films ===
- Godzilla: Final Wars (2004), Anna Otonashi
- The Setting Sun (2022)
- Even If This Love Disappears From the World Tonight (2022)
- Aoike Haruka no Jiken Channel (2026)

=== Television ===
- Tokugawa Yoshinobu (1998), Tami
- The Great White Tower (2003), Michiyo Satomi
