= Bandareh, West Azerbaijan =

Village in West Azerbaijan province, Iran

Bandareh Persian: بن دره
- Village
- Location within Iran
- Coordinates: 36°43′37″N 45°08′02″E
- Country: Iran
- Province: West Azerbaijan
- County: Piranshahr
- District: Central
- Rural District: Piran

Population (2016)
  - Total: 657
- Time zone: UTC+3:30 (IRST)

Bandareh (Persian: بن دره) is a village in Piran Rural District of the Central District in Piranshahr County, West Azerbaijan province, Iran.

== Demographics ==
=== Population ===
At the time of the 2006 National Census, the village's population was 424 in 77 households. The following census in 2011 counted 570 people in 131 households. The 2016 census measured the population of the village as 657 people in 163 households.
