= Jireh =

Jireh may refer to:

- Jireh Ibañes (born 1982), a Filipino basketball player
- "Jireh" (song), a 2021 Christian devotional song
- Jireh International Pty Ltd, a holding company that franchises Gloria Jean's Coffees
- Jireh Swift Billings, son of Franklin S. Billings, Jr.
- Jireh Chapel, Haywards Heath, Baptist establishment in West Sussex, England
- Jireh Baptist Church, Brisbane, defunct establishment in Australia

== See also ==
- Jehovah-jireh, a place in the book of Genesis
- Jira (disambiguation)
- Jereh (disambiguation)
