= Jira (given name) =

Jira or Jeera is a Thai given name. Notable people with the name include:

- Jira Maligool (born 1961), Thai film director
- Jira Payne, American politician
- Jira Wichitsongkhram, former Thai Minister of Defence
- Jeera Jarernsuk, Thai footballer
