= Kohneh Lahijan =

Village in West Azerbaijan province, Iran

Kohneh Lahijan Persian: كهنه لاهيجان
- Village
- Location within Iran
- Coordinates: 36°37′53″N 45°06′46″E
- Country: Iran
- Province: West Azerbaijan
- County: Piranshahr
- District: Central
- Rural District: Piran

Population (2016)
  - Total: 981
- Time zone: UTC+3:30 (IRST)

Kohneh Lahijan (Persian: كهنه لاهيجان) (Note: Also romanized as Kehneh Lāhījān and Kohneh Lāhījān) is a village in Piran Rural District of the Central District in Piranshahr County, West Azerbaijan province, Iran.

== Demographics ==
=== Population ===
At the time of the 2006 National Census, the village's population was 957 in 170 households. The following census in 2011 counted 962 people in 236 households. The 2016 census measured the population of the village as 981 people in 227 households.
