= Godzilla: The Series =

American animated television series (1998–2000)

- Genre: Kaiju; Science fiction Action
- Based on: Godzilla by Toho Co., Ltd
- Developed by: Jeff Kline; Richard Raynis
- Voices of: Ian Ziering; Brigitte Bako; Rino Romano; Charity James; Malcolm Danare; Tom Kenny
- Theme music composer: Jim Latham
- Composer: Jim Latham
- Country of origin: United States
- Original language: English
- No. of seasons: 2
- No. of episodes: 40 (2 unaired)

Production
- Executive producers: Richard Raynis; Dean Devlin; Roland Emmerich
- Producer: Audu Paden
- Editors: C.K. Horness; Adam Weiss; Richard C. Allen
- Camera setup: Myung Soo Song
- Running time: 23 minutes
- Production companies: Centropolis Television; Toho Co., Ltd.; Adelaide Productions; Columbia TriStar Television

Original release
- Network: Fox Kids
- Release: September 12, 1998 – April 22, 2000

Related
- Godzilla (1998)

Godzilla: The Series is an American animated television series series developed by Jeff Kline and Richard Raynis. The series was produced by Centropolis Television, Toho Co., Ltd., Adelaide Productions and Columbia TriStar Television and originally aired on Fox Kids in the United States between September 12, 1998, and April 22, 2000, and is a sequel to Godzilla (1998). Malcolm Danare, Kevin Dunn and Michael Lerner reprise their roles from the film.

== Plot ==
The series follows the Humanitarian Environmental (or Ecological, in "Area 51") Analysis Team (or HEAT for short), a research team led by Dr. Nick Tatopoulos (voiced by Ian Ziering) as they battle giant mutant monsters that frequently appear in the wake of the events depicted in the 1998 film Godzilla. Dr. Tatopoulos accidentally discovers an egg that survived the aerial bombardment before it hatches, in a minor change from the ending in the 1998 film. The creature hatches after Nick Tatopoulos stumbles onto him and he assumes him to be his parent. Subsequently, Dr. Tatopoulos and his associates form a research team, investigating strange occurrences and defending mankind from dangerous mutations.

Godzilla, the only hatchling of his species to survive in the movie, imprints on Nick and becomes the main weapon summoned against the other mutations encountered by the human characters.

The series also introduces two new characters: Monique Dupre, a French secret agent assigned by Philippe Roache to keep an eye on Godzilla and H.E.A.T., and Randy Hernandez, an intern of Nick's who specializes in computer hacking.

== Characters ==
=== H.E.A.T. ===
Godzilla on the Empire State Building as depicted in the opening to Godzilla: The Series.

- Godzilla – A giant mutated iguana-like monster and the only surviving offspring of the first Godzilla who attacked New York City in 1998. Due to Nick's accidental presence at his hatching, Godzilla imprinted on Nick as his parent and, as a result, is very protective of him. Nick also has the ability to control Godzilla to a certain extent, which allows humans to use him as a weapon against other giant mutated monsters. Godzilla always seems able to sense whenever Nick is in trouble and is quite willing to follow him and the rest of H.E.A.T. all over the world. Unlike his biological parent, he is incapable of asexual reproduction but is capable of using the signature atomic breath.
- Dr. Niko "Nick" Tatopoulos (voiced by Ian Ziering) – Leader of H.E.A.T. and the "adoptive father" of Godzilla. He fiercely protects Godzilla and other mutations from both foreign and domestic governments. Ziering takes over the role from film actor Matthew Broderick.
- Dr. Elsie Chapman (voiced by Charity James) – One of the original members of Nick's team; a sarcastic and cynical palaeo-biologist. She specializes in studying the behavior of Godzilla and other mutations. She also has the tendency to be jealous of Audrey around Nick, leading to the two women to snark at each other. James takes over the role from film actress Vicki Lewis.
- Dr. Mendel Craven (voiced by Malcolm Danare) – The team's engineer and chemist. He is slightly cowardly (as his last name implies) and prone to numerous strong allergies, but is often resourceful. He is also enamored of Elsie. Although initially fearful of Godzilla, over the course of the series he comes to trust the monster as an ally. Danare reprises his role from the film.
  - N.I.G.E.L. (voiced by Tom Kenny) – Short for "Next Millennium Intelligence Gathering Electronic Liaison", N.I.G.E.L. is an analysis robot created by Mendel and oftentimes reprogrammed by Randy to have various quirky voices from a Texas cowboy to a Shakespearean actor. A running gag on the show is that he is damaged or destroyed in every episode, presumably to be rebuilt or replaced later.
- Randy Hernandez (voiced by Rino Romano) – An intern and expert hacker working under Nick, and is Godzilla's constant supporter like Nick. Talented in various fields of technology, but extremely lazy, sarcastic, and somewhat laconic, he usually annoys Mendel by programming N.I.G.E.L. with different various personalities, all the while sharing a tight brotherly rival turned friendship with Mendel. Randy has a crush on Monique but is often rebutted when he attempts to court her.
- Monique Dupre (voiced by Brigitte Bako) – A French Agent of the DGSE specializing in hand-to-hand combat and infiltration. She was originally sent to have Godzilla killed, but becomes a member of H.E.A.T. after being assigned to supervise Godzilla indefinitely. She is very talented with martial arts, espionage, and marksmanship.

=== Supporting ===
- Major Anthony Hicks (voiced by Kevin Dunn) – Commanding officer of the Sandy Point Military Base in New York, who played a key role in the first Godzilla's death. Though he is at first skeptical of the second Godzilla, over time he develops a soft spot for the creature, whom he views as a hero. Dunn reprises his role from the film.
- Audrey Timmonds (voiced by Paget Brewster) – Nick's college sweetheart and somewhat untrustworthy girlfriend, whose career as a reporter often leads the two into conflict as seen in the film. Yet despite that, she is always been there for Nick whenever it involves his life and Godzilla's life. Brewster takes over the role from film actress Maria Pitillo.
- Victor "Animal" Palotti (voiced by Joe Pantoliano) – The Channel 8 News cameraman and Audrey's sarcastic working partner who is always willing to help her film Godzilla and the other mutations, alongside helping the H.E.A.T. team. He is also a happily married man and supportive of Nick and Audrey's relationship. Pantoliano takes over the role from film actor Hank Azaria.
- Mayor Ebert (voiced by Michael Lerner) – The cynical mayor of New York City who is determined to keep it safe from mutation-related threats. Lerner reprises his role from the film.
- Philippe Roache (voiced by Keith Szarabajka) – High ranking agent in the French DGSE. Roache led the team hunting down the first Godzilla and later sent Monique to kill the second, but relented when the creature saved lives. Szarabajka takes over the role from film actor Jean Reno.

=== Villains ===
- Cameron Winter (voiced by David Newsom) – A former classmate of Nick in college. He is a devious technological mogul whose desire is to control Godzilla for the furtherance of his ulterior goals. Smug and sadistic, Winter frequently taunts Nick and H.E.A.T. and often enacts various plans to keep Godzilla in line. He also knows how to cover up his acts and maintain his position, allowing him to avoid prosecution. At the end of the episode "Lizard Season," Winter has successfully sold his technology over to the US military and hides to build new robots to destroy Godzilla.
- Dale, Bill, and Hank (voiced by Ronny Cox, Tom Kenny, and Bob Joles respectively) – Three big-game hunters who came to New York to hunt Godzilla. The three of them would usually try to hunt Godzilla which usually ends with them either being thwarted by H.E.A.T. or ending up arrested. Their names are a parody of three of the main characters from King of the Hill and their bumbling antics are comparable to The Three Stooges, of which they are even called as such by Winter.
- Sidney Walker (voiced by Steve Susskind) - An electric bus maintenance worker who was undergoing a Theta wave therapy to cure his insomnia, but ended up in a coma-like state that eventually manifested his subconscious rage as the giant monster Crackler.
- The Leviathan Aliens (voiced by Ron Perlman) – An ancient species of psychically powerful extraterrestrials. One of their spaceships, called the Leviathan, crashed on Earth sometime during the Cretaceous Period of the Mesozoic Era and remained hidden until modern times. In the three-part episode "Monster Wars", they attempt to conquer Earth by using a tachyon transmitter to send mind-controlling signals to subdue the mutations in order for their alien race to invade the planet - including Godzilla and their cyborg mutation Cyber-Godzilla (created from the carcass of the first Godzilla) - but are ultimately defeated by H.E.A.T and a freed Godzilla and forced to retreat.
- Dr. Alexander Preloran (voiced by Kenneth Mars) - A brilliant xenobiologist who Craven idolizes. Preloran and his colleagues enter a sunken Leviathan ship, where Preloran decides to help them conquer Earth, believing it will help the planet. Preloran apparently sacrifices himself by launching an escape pod manually so H.E.A.T. and his colleagues can escape, though it is implied that he may have survived.
- Dr. Hugh Trevor (voiced by Roddy McDowall) - A scientist who was studying Nessie the Loch Ness Monster, but wants to destroy it for attacking his lab. It is later revealed he kidnapped Nessie's baby and plans to sell it on the black market. Trevor attempts to escape with the baby in his submersible, but is thwarted by Nessie.
- Dr. Jonathan Insley (voiced by Nick Jameson) - Insley is the creator of the D.R.A.G.M.A.s. In an alternate future, his creations had not only killed Godzilla, but also all of the other mutations on Monster Island, creating an apocalyptic scenario where humanity is forced to hide underground.
- Maximilian Spiel (voiced by Clancy Brown) - A wealthy businessman and illegal fight promoter who also sets up a monster fighting tournament on a private island for other wealthy attendees.
- Alexandra Springer (voiced by Linda Blair) - Alexandra Springer is the main antagonist in the episode "S.C.A.L.E." She is the fanatical leader of S.C.A.L.E. (short for Servants of Creatures Arriving Late to Earth), a radical animal-rights group that believe that mutations are the next stage of evolution and must be protected.
- Tobias Wilson (voiced by Dorian Harewood) - A ringmaster of the mutant circus "Mutant Mania", he put a bounty on Godzilla, but Nick and H.E.A.T. saved Godzilla from the bounty hunters. Later, Nick confronts him for his bounty on Godzilla, telling Wilson to leave Godzilla alone or he'd do everything in his power to shut down Mutant Mania. When Medusa, a mutated sea anemone escapes and starts wreaking havoc in New York, Wilson tries to stop Mayor Ebert from destroying Medusa on the claim of "private property," but the mayor refuses. Wilson attempts to flee with Medusa, but is captured by the military.
- Colonel Charles Tarrington (voiced by Michael Chiklis) - A US Army colonel who is heading a project overseeing the creation of mutant scorpions for weapons. After the first scorpion proves uncontrollable, he has a group of smaller, more controllable scorpions created. Having a high disregard for Godzilla and other mutations, Tarrington appears to see the error of his ways after Godzilla destroys the scorpions, but orders a new batch of scorpions created immediately after.
- Paul Dimanche (voiced by Jesse Corti) - A corrupt business owner who was overfishing a Louisiana bayou and leaving the locals hungry. He begins flirting with Audrey when she interviews him over alleged abuse of over-fishing and illegal dumping into the swamps, of which he denied at first. He showed no care or concern for the safety of his guests when the Swamp Beast attacks his boat and mansion during Mardi Gras. After he was saved by Georges, he confessed to committing bribery which was unknowingly to him filmed by Animal. He is arrested afterwards.
- Milo Sanders (voiced by Stuart Pankin) - An obnoxious and reckless tour guide of "Monster Liner", he bothers Nick and H.E.A.T. and ends up putting his passengers in danger while Godzilla was fighting the Deep Dweller. He also invited some photographers who attempted to get pictures of Godzilla up close, but were attacked by the Deep Dweller and had to be saved by H.E.A.T. However, while on deck, he discovers a video tapes that documents the location of Godzilla's lair and his bond with Nick and plans to reveal it to the public. Luckily, Animal called the news station and Milo's theft of the H.E.A.T. copter makes the news and leads to Milo getting arrested.

== Episodes ==
=== Series overview ===
Season	Episodes	Originally released	
Season	Episodes	First released	Last released
1	21	September 12, 1998	August 14, 1999
2	19	September 18, 1999	April 22, 2000

=== Season 1 (1998–99) ===
No. overall	No. in season	Title	Directed by	Written by	Original release date	Prod. code
1	1	"New Family: Part 1"	Audu Paden	Robert N. Skir & Marty Isenberg	September 12, 1998	#101
While scouring the sewers of New York, Nick Tatopoulos discovers one of Godzilla's eggs has survived. The hatchling that emerges escapes and by the time the team finds him again he has grown into a massive adult. Godzilla recognizes Nick's scent and imprints on him as his parent. As the team tries to study the new Godzilla, the U.S. military, responding to a series of disappearances in Jamaica, attack and seemingly kill Godzilla.
2	2	"New Family: Part 2"	Audu Paden	Robert N. Skir & Marty Isenberg	September 19, 1998	#102
With Godzilla seemingly dead, the team journey to Jamaica to help the U.S. military investigate the ongoing disappearances in Jamaica. The team discover that a group of giant squids and a hideous mutant crustacean — Crustaceous Rex — are responsible and Godzilla, who has survived the military attack, arrives to fight the beast off. Nick must now battle to help Major Hicks defeat C-Rex, and then convince him that Godzilla is more useful alive than dead.
3	3	"D.O.A."	Frank Squillace	Richard Mueller	September 26, 1998	#104
H.E.A.T. are called to help the Central America Republic of Costo Rojo to deal with "El Gusano Gigante", a mutant worm that is devouring untold amounts of crops. The country's ruler, General Albondiga, uses an experimental bioweapon against the worm and Godzilla, but the worm is only strengthened by the attack. Mendel must synthesize an antidote for the poisoned Godzilla, then find a way to defeat El Gusano Gigante without Albondiga interfering.
4	4	"Talkin' Trash"	Tim Eldred	Steve Perry	October 3, 1998	#103
In response to a sanitation workers' strike, a colony of petroleum-eating microbes, controlled by nanotechnology, are released to try to curb New York's garbage problem. Unfortunately, the microbes quickly grow out of control and now the team and Godzilla must find a way to stop the colony before it devours Manhattan.
5	5	"The Winter of Our Discontent"	Sam Liu	Robert N. Skir & Marty Isenberg	October 10, 1998	#105
After Godzilla battles robotic insects, the team encounter their creator: Cameron Winter, a powerful technology mogul and an old rival of Nick's from college. He wants H.E.A.T. to work with him, but Nick refuses, suspecting his old enemy has ulterior motives. But can he find out what they are before Winter's schemes have fatal consequences for Godzilla?
6	6	"Cat and Mouse"	Frank Squillace	Steve Melching	October 31, 1998	#106
The team not only have to contend with a plague of large mutant rats roaming the sewers of New York, but a trio of redneck hunters named Dale, Bill, and Hank who are seeking to make Godzilla the ultimate hunting trophy.
7	7	"What Dreams May Come"	Frank Squillace	Len Wein	November 7, 1998	#108
When a strange electrical creature known as the Crackler attacks seemingly random locations in Manhattan, the team investigate. But the Crackler is not behaving like the mutations H.E.A.T. have fought before, and what is its connection to mild-mannered insomniac Sidney Walker? (voiced by Steve Susskind)
8	8	"Leviathan"	Tim Eldred	Michael Reaves	November 14, 1998	#107
The team are called to help a rescue mission for xenobiologist Alexander Preloran (voiced by Kenneth Mars), who disappeared while on a mission to explore the Leviathan, an alien spacecraft buried at the bottom of the Pacific Ocean for 65 million years. But once they go down, the team discovers that the ship's alien crew is very much alive...and they have plans for Earth.
9	9	"Hive"	Sam Liu	Marv Wolfman	November 21, 1998	#109
H.E.A.T. investigates the tropical island of Santa Marta in the wake of a devastating volcanic eruption. But what they find on the island is that, due to irradiated lava, a hideously mutated ecosystem has developed, including carnivorous plants and gigantic bees. As the volcano begins to erupt again and Godzilla confronts the bees' queen, the team must find a way to escape the island alive.
10	10	"Bird of Paradise"	Alan Caldwell	Neil Ruttenberg	December 5, 1998	#110
When villages in Mexico are attacked by a strange winged creature, ornithologist and Elsie's old fiancé Lawrence Cohen (Tate Donovan) calls H.E.A.T. for help. They quickly discover the beast is Quetzalcoatl, an evolutionary hybrid of bird and dinosaur capable of breathing fire and protected by impenetrable feathers. The team must find a way to stop the creature, but matters worsen when Quetzalcoatl takes Elsie to feed to its hungry young.
11	11	"DeadLoch"	Sam Liu	Steve Hayes	February 6, 1999	#112
H.E.A.T. heads for Scotland after Dr. Hugh Trevor (voiced by Roddy McDowall in his last role before his death) of the Pisces Marine Research Institute claims his facility was attacked by the Loch Ness Monster. Once Nick is convinced of Nessie's existence, he discovers that the facility is hiding a terrible secret: Trevor has captured Nessie's baby and plans to sell it on the black market. Now the team must convince Godzilla to work with Nessie if they are to save her young and ensure her safety in Loch Ness.
12	12	"Monster Wars: Part 1"	Christopher Berkeley	Robert N. Skir & Marty Isenberg	February 13, 1999	#115
As tension threatens to break up the H.E.A.T. team for good, major problems arise: a Giant Bat is terrorizing the countryside of Nigeria, the U.S. military has dredged the Leviathan ship from the bottom of the Pacific, and worst of all, the aliens are back, with an army of mutations under their control and plans to conquer Earth.
13	13	"Monster Wars: Part 2"	Sam Liu	Steve Melching	February 20, 1999	#116
From their secret base on Isle del Diablo, the aliens assemble their forces. H.E.A.T. desperately fights to resist, but are easily defeated. Once captured and brought to the aliens, they are told that the mutation army — including a brainwashed Godzilla — will be used to attack major cities across the world in preparation for a full-scale invasion of Earth. At its head marches the aliens' ultimate weapon: Cyber-Godzilla, a reborn cyborg version of the first Godzilla.
14	14	"Monster Wars: Part 3"	Alan Caldwell	Michael Reaves	February 27, 1999	#117
As the aliens and their mutation allies attack Earth, H.E.A.T. escapes captivity. They battle to defeat the alien onslaught and free the mutations from their control to help humanity fight back and save the planet from conquest.
15	15	"Competition"	Frank Squillace	Harry "Doc" Kloor	March 6, 1999	#113
A trip to Japan to investigate a number of mysterious disappearances leads to a battle of wills between H.E.A.T. and the Japanese military, who perceive Godzilla to be a threat. However, the real threat is revealed to be an ophidiaphobic's nightmare: a mutant King cobra. Things lead to a climactic showdown in Tokyo between the King Cobra and Godzilla. Note: this episode is chronologically the King Cobra's first appearance, but it was broadcast after the "Monster War" trilogy-its chronologically second appearance-had aired.
16	16	"Freeze"	Christopher Berkeley	Barry Hawkins	March 13, 1999	#111
H.E.A.T. are dispatched to aid investigation into the disappearance of a search party looking for oil in Antarctica. The team must now not only battle against the monsters responsible — a pack of mutant "Ice Borers" — but also against the energy company who employed the men, who are determined to brush all record of the incident under the rug.
17	17	"Bug Out!"	Frank Squillace	Brooks Wachtel	March 20, 1999	#114
Godzilla is throwing infantile tantrums and H.E.A.T. are growing worried about their ability to control him. When Audrey lets this slip on live TV, despite being told in confidence by Nick, their relationship looks set to be torn apart. Meanwhile, when called in to investigate extensive deforestation in the Amazon rain forest, they discover that a mutant termite colony is devouring the forest at an alarming rate. H.E.A.T. must find a way to destroy the voracious insects before they devour the entire rain forest.
18	18	"Web Site"	Christopher Berkeley	Marsha F. Griffin	May 1, 1999	#120
H.E.A.T. is charged by the Pentagon to investigate the growing population of spiders near an Army base in the Canary Islands. The team quickly discover that a massive mutant female black widow spider has been laying millions of eggs. They must find a way to destroy the baby spiders and help Godzilla defeat the mother.
19	19	"An Early Frost"	Sam Liu	Craig Miller	May 8, 1999	#118
When Godzilla is accused of attacking New York, the military call in H.E.A.T. to help contain him. But Phillipe Roache has returned from France...with orders to terminate Godzilla. However, H.E.A.T. discovers the real culprit is a hideous mutation called the Chameleon, genetically engineered by Cameron Winter (who has escaped from jail) to frame Godzilla. Can they stop Winter and reveal the truth before it is too late?
20	20	"Juggernaut"	Frank Squillace	Tom Pugsley & Greg Klein	July 31, 1999	#122
The Techno-Sentient, an alien piece of technology, falls to Earth and begins to bond with all manner of human technology, growing to gargantuan proportions. Worst of all, it taps into the Internet and learns of the location of humanity's weapons of mass destruction. The team and Godzilla must find a way to stop the Techno-Sentient before it takes control of an arsenal of nuclear missiles.
21	21	"Trust No One"	Nathan Chew	Greg Pincus	August 14, 1999	#124
Acting on confidential information from Phillipe, H.E.A.T. investigate an abandoned lab in the Amazon rain forest where, 50 years before, French scientists succeeded in creating a creature made of pure DNA. The creature is capable of mimicking the shape of any living creature it touches and soon the team are put on edge, uncertain whom to trust. They must find a way to aid Godzilla and destroy the creature before it can reproduce and go on to create a new master race of monsters.

=== Season 2 (1999–2000) ===
No. overall	No. in season	Title	Directed by	Written by	Original release date	Prod. code
22	1	"Future Shock"	Alan Caldwell	Tom Pugsley & Greg Klein	September 18, 1999	#136
While pursuing a mutant jellyfish, a mysterious storm propels the H.E.A.T. team into the year 2022. There, they discover a post-apocalyptic future where Godzilla and the other mutations are all dead, humanity is all but extinct, and the world is overrun by terrifying creatures known as Dragmas. As the team battle for survival alongside future versions of Craven and Hicks, they discover that the Dragmas was created by the scientist Johnathan Insley (voiced by Nick Jameson). After narrowly making their way back to the past, they decide to stop him before he can create the monster race. But Insley's Democratic Resurgence Against a Global Mechanized Armageddon (D.R.A.G.M.A.) project is ready to be activated, and now the team must battle to destroy Insley's work before the Dragmas are unleashed and the bleak future they saw becomes a reality.
23	2	"Cash of the Titans"	Sean Song	Andrew Deutsch	September 25, 1999	#140
In the middle of an attack on H.E.A.T. headquarters by a giant water beetle, the team is shocked to find Godzilla is not responding to their distress call. After fending off the beetle, the team discovers that the billionaire Maximillian Speil (voiced by Clancy Brown) is hosting a monster fighting ring - with Godzilla as his new main attraction. Now with Audrey and Animal in tow, the team must save Godzilla from a brutal fight to the death against other mutations. Note: the Shrewster, a mutation from the episode "The Twister", makes its chronologically second appearance in this episode, but again, like the previous season's episodes with the King Cobra, it was broadcast before the aforementioned chronologically first appearance had aired.
24	3	"S.C.A.L.E."	Christopher Berkeley	Scott Lobdell	October 2, 1999	#135
Told in a documentary style and from the point of view of cameras (either Animal's video camera or Monster Island's security cameras), the H.E.A.T team are called to Miami to deal with Skeetera, a giant mutant female mosquito, when they come under attack from S.C.A.L.E. (Servants of Creatures Arriving Late to Earth), an eco-terrorist group - led by Alexandra Springer (voiced by Linda Blair) - who believe that mutations are the next stage of evolution. After capturing the rampaging insect, H.E.A.T transports Skeetera to Monster Island so she can be studied by the U.S. military. But unknown to them, they have unwanted guests: Animal and Audrey have stowed away on board the 'Heat-Seeker' hoping for a good story and S.C.A.L.E. has tracked them to Monster Island. When the terrorists take over Monster Island with plans to release the mutations that are already held there, the only hope lies in the combined forces of Godzilla, H.E.A.T, Major Hicks and his troops, and Audrey and Animal.
25	4	"Protector"	Christopher Berkeley	Mark Hoffmeier	October 9, 1999	#128
Archaeologists in Egypt accidentally reawaken Norrzug the Iron Lion, a gargantuan Sphinx-like monster that once served as the guardian of the ancient city of Amon-Ra. H.E.A.T. discovers from ancient texts that the people of the city deliberately rusted the creature to stop its rampage after it turned on them. Now the team must find a way to repeat the feat before this mythological terror devours every last drop of oil in the Middle East.
26	5	"Freak Show"	Nathan Chew	Steve L. Hayes	December 11, 1999	#130
When circus ringmaster Tobias Wilson (voiced by Dorian Harewood) brings his "Weird World of Wonders" mutation circus to Manhattan, things go terribly wrong when a mutant sea anemone called Medusa escapes her tank and goes on the rampage. When the team discovers the creature is sucking water out of her victims, as she needs the electrolytes found in water to survive, the race is on to stop Medusa before she drains every drop of water on the planet.
27	6	"End of the Line"	David Hartman	Steve Melching	December 18, 1999	#137
While on a romantic cruise to Alaska, Nick and Audrey's ship is attacked by a mutant turtle, but they are saved - not by Godzilla, but by Komodithrax, a mutant Komodo dragon. When Godzilla heads for Alaska to find Nick and H.E.A.T. follows, they make a shocking discovery: Godzilla and Komodithrax are in love and Godzilla has become the surrogate father to an egg laid by Komodithrax. The menacing turtle is still nearby, however, and the U.S. military is ordered to destroy all monsters in the area, leading to Nick and the team to try to protect the two gargantuan reptilian lovers. During the battle, the airstrike causes the giant turtle as well as Komodithrax and her egg to fall into a fissure. All three are presumed dead. Saddened, Godzilla retreats. Nick wants to propose marriage to Audrey, but she misunderstands. Heartbroken, Nick heads back to New York.
28	7	"What a Long, Strange Trip It's Been"	Brad Rader	Janna King Kalichman	January 15, 2000	#119
While fighting a giant mutant bacteria named the Bacillus, Godzilla is infected by it along with Mendel and are left fighting for their lives. While Elsie and Randy create an antibiotic to weaken the bacterium, Nick and Monique must enter Godzilla's body and destroy the infection at its source before Godzilla and Mendel die.
29	8	"Wedding Bells Blew"	Alan Caldwell	Steve Cuden	January 22, 2000	#121
When Elsie's estranged parents come to New York for her spoiled sister's wedding, she is forced to attend as maid of honour instead of helping H.E.A.T capture a mutant manta ray. When the military's battle with the creature ends up interrupting the wedding, Elsie is determined not only to catch the creature but also to prove to her parents that she is not the screw-up that they think she is. Note: Robert Forster voices Elsie's father: Jack Chapman and Alice Hirson voices Elsie's mother: Peg Chapman
30	9	"Metamorphosis"	Alan Caldwell	George Melrod	January 29, 2000	#131
Shortly after receiving an anonymous check for $5 million, H.E.A.T. are called to Illinois, where a gigantic mutant chilopod, the Megapede, is devouring thousands of dollars' worth of crops. The team is unable to stop the creature when they first encounter it and upon finding it again, they discover it has metamorphosed into a Giant Cicada. The insect's mating call is disrupting all radar in Chicago and now H.E.A.T must find a way to silence the creature long enough to launch a counterattack.
31	10	"Area 51"	Alan Caldwell	Jeff Wynne	February 5, 2000	#138
Just as H.E.A.T has had it with Randy, Elsie convinces the rest of the team to investigate a possible mutation sighting at Area 51, where they discover the real secret of Area 51 is not aliens but mutations, created by underground nuclear testing. When one of the captive mutations - a mutant thorny devil (a species of lizard) - breaks out of its cage, the team and Godzilla must stop the creature from escaping the base and destroying nearby Las Vegas. Note: Doug Savant starred in Godzilla (1998) as Sgt. O'Neil, but he voices a different character in this episode.
32	11	"The Twister"	Andy Thom	Lara Runnels & Patti Carr	February 12, 2000	#134
During a nice relaxing day at the beach, the team is caught off-guard by a twister. They trace its origins to an experimental energy experiment at a local power plant, as well as discovering strange tracks near the plant. When the twister strikes again, H.E.A.T. discovers that a giant mutant shrew has been bonded to the twister, creating a "Shrewster", and now the race is on to defeat it before its ravenous metabolism drives it to eat everything in New York. The Shrewster scratches and pierces Godzilla's skin using its claws and bites his neck, but Godzilla recovers and defeats it.
33	12	"Shafted"	Sean Song	Robin Russin	February 19, 2000	#123
On their way to an expo in an attempt to win a research patent in Wyoming, the team meets a lost young girl named Meg (voiced by Mae Whitman). She asks the team to rescue her two brothers Steven (voiced by Mikey Kelley) and Kevin (voiced by Robbie Rist), who went into a silver mine where a gang of miners disappeared without trace fifty years before. While Monique is left babysitting Meg (much to her displeasure), the rest of the team encounters the Silver Hydra: a monster capable of encasing anyone unfortunate enough to meet it in silver and able to regenerate itself every time it is harmed. Now the race is on to defeat the Hydra before Kevin, Steven, Elsie, and Godzilla end up as lifeless silver statues.
34	13	"Where Is Thy Sting?"	Frank Squillace	William Stout	February 26, 2000	#132
While tracking Godzilla to Fort Armstrong, New Mexico, the team discovers that a gigantic mutant scorpion, called Ts-eh-go by the locals, is on the rampage. But when they try to contain the mutation, they come under fire from the U.S. military under the command of Colonel Charles Tarrington (voiced by Michael Chiklis), an old friend of Hicks, who is out to destroy both Ts-eh-go and Godzilla. When H.E.A.T discover Ts-eh-go was created by the army's "First Wave" program, and that Tarrington is planning to use the creature's offspring - codenamed the "Second Wave" - as bioweapons, H.E.A.T and Hicks must convince Tarrington to abort the mission when the scorpions get out of control. Godzilla protects Major Hicks and Colonel Tarrington by stepping in front of them and being sprayed with the scorpion's acid. Tarrington then orders Godzilla to be killed and Hicks is aghast, pointing out that Godzilla took a hit for him.
35	14	"Lizard Season"	Alan Caldwell	Robert N. Skir	March 11, 2000	#125
Cameron Winter springs Dale, Bill, and Hank, the redneck hunters from "Cat And Mouse", from jail and uses them to pilot the "Lizard Slayers": three extremely well-armed battle mechas (a giant robot, a tank, and a jet plane) programmed with one mission: to destroy Godzilla. When Cameron takes control of H.E.A.T.'s computer systems to stop them from intervening, Nick and the others must get rid of Cameron, then find a way to save Godzilla from the three hunters.
36	15	"Vision"	Sam Liu	Carl Ellsworth	March 18, 2000	#129
The team are called to San Francisco, where a flock of giant mutant hummingbirds are attacking aircraft. The creatures move too fast for the naked eye to see them, making them impossible for Godzilla to fight them. Now Craven must rig up a special set of goggles that will allow Godzilla to see the birds, giving him a chance to fight back.
37	16	"Underground Movement"	Sam Liu	Marsha F. Griffin	April 1, 2000	#133
The team is split up due to a lawsuit by the city of Miami (over damages caused by a giant mutant vampire bat). While Nick, Monique, and Elsie deal with the lawsuit, Randy and Craven decide to deal with a mutation (without Nick's permission) in Michigan. The mutation in question is Armillaria, a giant fungus with the ability to suck the amino acids out of any living thing. It swiftly proves too much for the duo, who end up trapped in the wilderness with nothing but their wits and the clothes on their backs. Once the others hear of their antics, the race is on to rescue the duo and defeat Armillaria before it sucks Godzilla dry.
38	17	"Ring of Fire"	Sean Song & Brad Rader	Rodney Gibbs	April 22, 2000	#127
The FireFly, a strange creature made of living flame, attacks an oil rig platform off the coast of Texas. When H.E.A.T. and Godzilla arrive to stop it, Randy and Craven sense a chance to make a lot of money if they can exploit the monster's ability to regenerate energy. Once H.E.A.T has taken the creature out, Randy and Mendel sneak it back to headquarters for study, but things go terribly wrong when the FireFly regains consciousness and starts burning down everything in its path.
39	18	"The Ballad of Gens Du Marais"	Sam Liu	Angel Dean Lopez	Unaired	#126
While in New Orleans covering Mardi Gras, Audrey hears rumors of a strange "Swamp Beast" and decides to call in H.E.A.T.. The creature swiftly proves itself a match for Godzilla and the team begin to suspect something is afoot when the locals claim the beast is the swamp's revenge against a corrupt local politician, Paul Dimanche (voiced by Jesse Corti), who wants to mine oil in the bayou. But can they prove it before the Swamp Beast destroys New Orleans? Note: This episode did not air, but it was shown at the 2001 Asian Fantasy Film Expo in New Jersey.
40	19	"Tourist Trap"	Nathan Chew	Marty Isenberg	Unaired	#139
The Deep-Dweller, a huge mutant frogfish, begins to attack boats and fishing ships off the coast of New Jersey. H.E.A.T. must help Godzilla drive the creature back to deeper waters and also deal with the interference of the sleazy and obnoxious tour promoter Milo Sanders (voiced by Stuart Pankin), who runs a mutation boat tour called the Manhattan Mutant Line and hopes to make even more money by getting good footage of Godzilla. Note: This episode did not air, but it was shown at the 2001 Asian Fantasy Film Expo in New Jersey.

== Home media ==
Columbia TriStar Home Video released two separate episode collections on VHS: Trouble Hatches, composed of the two-part pilot episode (which was actually titled "New Family" when it first aired), and Monster War, featuring the three-part episode of the same name. In 2004 and 2006 respectively, Sony released nine episodes on DVD, spread out onto three separate volumes: The Monster Wars Trilogy (2004), consisting of the same three-part episode previously released on the VHS version, Monster Mayhem (2006), which included "What Dreams May Come", "Bird of Paradise", and "Deadloch", and Mutant Madness (2006), which contained "S.C.A.L.E.", "The Twister" and "Where Is Thy Sting?".

In 2006, Sony released the "Monster Edition" DVD of Godzilla (1998), featuring three episodes of the TV series: "What Dreams May Come", "Monster War: Part 1" and "Where Is Thy Sting?". In 2014, Mill Creek Entertainment released the complete series on DVD in North America, including the two unaired episodes. The episodes were released in chronological order, not the broadcast order.

As of 2026, the series is currently available for streaming online on The Roku Channel and Throwback Toons and Voyage YouTube channels (managed by Sony Pictures).

== Reception ==
The series did well during Fox Kids' Saturday morning line-up. Ultimately, however, it was overshadowed by the late 1990s Pokémon/Digimon war between Kids' WB and Fox Kids during the 1999–2000 at the time. As a result, Godzilla: The Series was placed in different timeslots on Saturdays to accommodate many of the Digimon marathons and back-to-back episodes (this would affect other Fox Kids shows as well). For a brief period of time, episodes of Godzilla: The Series were either never repeated, or skipped over and rescheduled. There was a brief period where the show was taken off the schedule to accommodate new shows for midseason, resulting in two episodes that were never broadcast in the U.S.

== Video games ==
Two video games were released for the Game Boy Color. They were developed by Crawfish Interactive and published by Crave Entertainment. Godzilla: The Series was released in 1999 and Godzilla: The Series - Monster Wars was released in 2000.
