= Taco Bell chihuahua =

Advertising figure and mascot

Gidget
- Species: Canis familiaris
- Breed: Chihuahua
- Sex: Female
- Born: February 7, 1994; United States
- Died: July 21, 2009 (aged 15); Santa Clarita, California

Gidget (February 7, 1994 – July 21, 2009), nicknamed the Taco Bell Chihuahua, was an advertising figure and mascot for Taco Bell from August 1997 to July 2000. The character she played was developed by TBWA. The Chihuahua is a breed commonly associated with Mexico.

== History ==
In August 1997, Taco Bell used the dog in one advertisement in the Northeastern United States. The advertising campaign began during a peak in the Burger wars, in which several fast food chains were engaged in a large advertisement competition against each other. The dog was made to speak through special effects. Her advertising catchphrase was "¡Yo quiero Taco Bell!" ("I want Taco Bell!"). Her voice was provided by Carlos Alazraqui, who says that the voice is a cross between Hungarian-born actor Peter Lorre (The Maltese Falcon) and Ren Höek, the cartoon chihuahua from The Ren & Stimpy Show (who in turn was also based on Lorre), with a touch of Anthony Quinn from Requiem for a Heavyweight. The dog also started two additional catchphrases: "Yeah, drop the Chalupa!" (which briefly became an oft-quoted phrase on SportsCenter) and "Viva Gorditas!" In a noted crossover with the 1998 Godzilla film, the dog tried to trap the monster in a box, goading the beast with the phrase, "Here, lizard, lizard, lizard!", only to see Godzilla's size and respond, "Uh-oh, I think I need a bigger box." (a reference to Jaws), and another Godzilla crossover involving her giving an order through a drive-thru speaker from Godzilla's tail, making an order too large for the workers.

== Popularity ==
The figure grew popular, so much so that talking toy figures of the dog were produced and sold at Taco Bell locations during 1998 to 1999, as well as other versions at other stores, and "Yo quiero (X)" became a recognized quote in popular culture.

== Controversies ==
Some Latin Americans accused the dog of being a cultural stereotype. Commercials that depicted the dog as a bandido with a sombrero or as a revolutionary wearing a beret (similar to the one famously worn by Argentine revolutionary Che Guevara) were seen as particularly insensitive. Mario G. Obledo, a civil rights leader, called for a boycott of Taco Bell if the company did not end the ad campaign.

In July 2000, Taco Bell ended the chihuahua advertisements, ended its relationship with their creator TBWA, and replaced the company's president, after same-store sales fell by 6% in the second quarter of 2000, the largest such decline in Taco Bell history. It was incorrectly rumored that Taco Bell ended the commercials because the dog died. Voice actor Tom Kenny, who is a friend of Alazraqui, said that Hispanic advocacy groups lobbying for the end of the campaign led to the cancelation of the Taco Bell dog. Other reports say the use of the dog was discontinued because it failed to increase Taco Bell's revenue stream in spite of the dog's popularity.

=== Lawsuit ===
In 2003, Taco Bell lost a lawsuit by two Michigan men, who had pitched the concept of the Chihuahua to Taco Bell in 1996 at a Licensing Show in NYC. Taco Bell worked with Thomas Rinks and Joseph Shields for over a year developing the Chihuahua campaign and commercials under the name "Psycho Chihuahua", but Taco Bell failed to pay the men according to court documents. The men sued and, in 2003, a jury awarded them $30.1 million in compensation plus nearly $12 million in additional interest three months later. Taco Bell in turn sued TBWA saying it should have been aware of the conflicts. In 2009, a three-judge federal appeals panel ruled against Taco Bell.

== Further career ==
In later years, Gidget appeared in a 2002 commercial for insurance company GEICO, and as "Bruiser's Mom" in the 2003 movie Legally Blonde 2: Red, White & Blonde.

== Death ==
Gidget was euthanized on July 21, 2009, at age 15 after having suffered a stroke in the home of her trainer Sue Chipperton in Santa Clarita, California. She was cremated, and her ashes were retained by her trainer. Taco Bell Corp. said in a statement that Gidget would be missed by many fans and said: "Our deepest sympathies go out to her owners and fans."

== See also ==
- Fast food advertising
- Frito Bandito
- List of individual dogs
