= Qaleh Tarash =

Village in West Azerbaijan province, Iran

Qaleh Tarash Persian: قلعه تراش
- Village
- Location within Iran
- Coordinates: 36°36′43″N 45°09′48″E
- Country: Iran
- Province: West Azerbaijan
- County: Piranshahr
- District: Central
- Rural District: Piran

Population (2016)
  - Total: 643
- Time zone: UTC+3:30 (IRST)

Qaleh Tarash (Persian: قلعه تراش) (Note: Also romanized as Qal‘eh Tarāsh; formerly known as Qalateh Rash, also romanized as Qalāteh Rash (قلاته رش); also known as Qal‘eh Rash [قلعه رش]) is a village in Piran Rural District of the Central District in Piranshahr County, West Azerbaijan province, Iran.

== Demographics ==
=== Population ===
At the time of the 2006 National Census, the village's population, as Qalateh Rash, was 628 in 110 households. The following census in 2011 counted 646 people in 139 households, by which time it was listed as Qaleh Tarash. The 2016 census measured the population of the village as 643 people in 174 households.
