= Naminjeh =

Village in West Azerbaijan province, Iran

Naminjeh Persian: نمينجه
- Village
- Location within Iran
- Coordinates: 36°35′44″N 45°10′33″E
- Country: Iran
- Province: West Azerbaijan
- County: Piranshahr
- District: Central
- Rural District: Piran

Population (2016)
  - Total: 398
- Time zone: UTC+3:30 (IRST)

Naminjeh (Persian: نمينجه) (Note: Also romanized as Namīnjeh) is a village in Piran Rural District of the Central District in Piranshahr County, West Azerbaijan province, Iran.

== Demographics ==
=== Population ===
At the time of the 2006 National Census, the village's population was 420 in 63 households. The following census in 2011 counted 372 people in 71 households. The 2016 census measured the population of the village as 398 people in 93 households.
