= Godzilla: Final Wars =

2004 science fiction action film directed by Ryuhei Kitamura

- Theatrical release poster by Noriyoshi Ohrai

Japanese name
- Kanji: ゴジラ 終末の戦争
Transcriptions
- Revised Hepburn: Gojira Fainaru Wōzu
- Directed by: Ryuhei Kitamura
- Screenplay by: Isao Kiriyama; Wataru Mimura
- Produced by: Kazunari Yamanaka
- Starring: Masahiro Matsuoka; Rei Kikukawa; Don Frye; Maki Mizuno; Kazuki Kitamura; Kane Kosugi; Kumi Mizuno; Kenji Sahara; Masami Nagasawa; Chihiro Otsuka; Shigeru Izumiya; Masakatsu Funaki; Masatō Ibu; Jun Kunimura; Akira Takarada
- Cinematography: Takumi Furuya
- Edited by: Shūichi Kakesu
- Music by: Keith Emerson; Nobuhiko Morino; Daisuke Yano
- Production company: Toho Pictures
- Distributed by: Toho
- Release dates: November 29, 2004 (Los Angeles); December 4, 2004 (Japan)
- Running time: 125 minutes
- Countries: Japan; Australia; United States; China
- Languages: Japanese; English; Cantonese
- Budget: ¥1.9 billion ($19.3 million)
- Box office: $9.2 million

Godzilla: Final Wars (ゴジラ ファイナル ウォーズ, Gojira Fainaru Wōzu) is a 2004 kaiju film directed by Ryuhei Kitamura, with special effects by Eiichi Asada. Distributed by Toho and produced by its subsidiary Toho Pictures, it is the 29th film in the Godzilla franchise, and the sixth and final film in the franchise's Millennium era. The film stars Masahiro Matsuoka, Rei Kikukawa, Don Frye, Maki Mizuno, Kazuki Kitamura, Kane Kosugi, Kumi Mizuno, Kenji Sahara, Masami Nagasawa, Chihiro Otsuka, Shigeru Izumiya, Masakatsu Funaki, Masato Ibu, Jun Kunimura, and Akira Takarada, with Tsutomu Kitagawa as Godzilla, Kazuhiro Yoshida as Gigan and Motokuni Nakagawa as Monster X. In the film, when a mysterious race of aliens known as the Xiliens arrive on Earth, the Earth Defense Force (EDF) find themselves locked in battle with various monsters attacking cities around the world, leading them to revive the only chance to save their planet: Godzilla.

The film coincided with the 50th anniversary of the franchise and features a variety of actors and kaiju from previous films. Godzilla: Final Wars premiered on November 29, 2004 in Los Angeles, California, and was released theatrically in Japan on December 4, 2004 to mixed reviews and it underperformed at the box office. Before the world premiere, Godzilla received a star on the Hollywood Walk of Fame.

Following its lackluster financial and critical reception, Final Wars was the last Godzilla film produced by any studio until Legendary Pictures' 2014 reboot, as well as the last Godzilla film produced by Toho until Shin Godzilla in 2016.

== Plot ==
Over the course of the 20th century, environmental disasters cause the appearance of giant monsters and superhumans, dubbed "mutants", who are then recruited into the Earth Defense Force (EDF) to battle the monsters. The strongest of these monsters is Godzilla, who becomes the EDF's greatest enemy and frequently threatens mankind over the years. In Antarctica, Godzilla is finally imprisoned under the ice during a battle with the powerful EDF warship Gotengo.

In the present day, an upgraded Gotengo, now commanded by Captain Douglas Gordon, battles and destroys Manda in the English Channel off the coast of Normandy, but the ship sustains serious damage during the battle and Gordon is suspended from the EDF. Mutant EDF ensign Shinichi Ozaki is tasked with guarding a U.N. biologist, Dr. Miyuki Otonashi, who is sent to study a mummified monster. As they examine it, they are briefly teleported to Infant Island by the Shobijin, who reveal the mummified monster as Gigan, an extraterrestrial cyborg that attempted to destroy the Earth ten thousand years earlier, and was ultimately subdued by Mothra. They warn that a battle between good and evil will happen soon, and that Ozaki must choose a side.

Several giant monsters attack major cities around the world: Rodan attacks New York City, Zilla attacks Sydney, Anguirus attacks Shanghai, King Caesar attacks Okinawa, Kamacuras attacks Paris, Kumonga attacks Monument Valley in Arizona, and Ebirah attacks Tokai. Meanwhile, Minilla, Godzilla's son, is found in Aokigahara by Kenta Taguchi and his grandfather, Samon. The EDF engages the monsters until they mysteriously vanish, as a huge alien vessel appears over Tokyo. The aliens introduce themselves as the Xiliens, claim that they eliminated the monsters as a gesture of goodwill, and warn Earth's leaders that an incoming runaway white dwarf star called Gorath will soon impact the Earth, offering their help to destroy it.

After a peace pact is signed between humanity and the Xiliens, Ozaki, Miyuki, and Miyuki's sister Anna, a news reporter, discover that the Gorath shown by the Xiliens is a hologram and that the Xiliens have replaced several members of the EDF and U.N. secretary-general Naotaro Daigo with imposters. After the Xiliens are exposed with help from Gordon and the other mutants, the Xiliens' second-in-command, the Controller, kills his leader to assume command, revealing their plan to use humans as a food source while taking control of all the mutants, except for Ozaki, through a property in their DNA known as "M-base". The Controller also has the monsters under his control through M-base in their DNA, and awakens Gigan to wipe out the EDF. The group escapes in a repaired Gotengo, although Gigan pursues them.

Gordon convinces the Gotengo's crew to travel to Antarctica to release Godzilla, who is immune to the Xiliens' control thanks to his lack of M-base and easily defeats Gigan. The Gotengo then guides Godzilla into a series of battles with the other monsters: he defeats Zilla in Sydney, Kumonga in New Guinea, and Kamacuras in Manazuru. At Hakone, Samon, who witnesses Godzilla’s arrival with Kenta and Minilla, remarks that long ago, humanity’s actions angered Godzilla, leading to his decades of aggression. After Godzilla battles and subdues Rodan, Anguirus and Caesar at Mount Fuji, the Gotengo leads him to Tokyo to defeat the Xiliens.

Ozaki’s comrade Katsunori Kazama sacrifices himself to disable the Xilien mothership’s barrier shield, allowing the Gotengo's crew to penetrate the ship, but they are captured and brought before the Controller as he summons Gorath to Earth. After defeating Ebirah and Hedorah in Tokyo, Godzilla destroys Gorath just before it can hit the Earth, but this unleashes the Xiliens' ultimate weapon, Monster X, and the two monsters battle. A repaired and upgraded Gigan joins Monster X, but is intercepted by Mothra, who manages to destroy him once and for all.

Aboard the Xilien mothership, the Controller reveals that both he and Ozaki are superior beings known as "Keizers", powerful beings distinct from regular mutants born on rare occasions when human DNA and M-base are combined, before directly taking control of Ozaki to turn him against the group. As a fight breaks out, the Controller loses control of Ozaki due to the Shobijins' blessing. Ozaki unlocks his true power and defeats the Controller, who triggers the mothership's self-destruct as the group falls back to the Gotengo moments before the mothership explodes. Godzilla and Monster X continue their battle, but Monster X transforms into its true form, Keizer Ghidorah. Godzilla is overpowered by Keizer Ghidorah, but Ozaki transfers some of his own Keizer energy to Godzilla, giving him the strength to destroy Keizer Ghidorah.

Despite the Gotengo's crew proving instrumental in his victory, an enraged Godzilla shoots down the Gotengo before attempting to attack the vessel's crew. Fortunately, Minilla arrives with Kenta and Samon, and convinces Godzilla to spare the crew. Ozaki, Miyuki, Gordon, Anna, and the other humans watch as Godzilla and Minilla return to the ocean.

== Cast ==
=== Humans and Xiliens ===
- Masahiro Matsuoka as Shinichi Ozaki, a mutant ensign in the Earth Defense Forces.
- Rei Kikukawa as Dr. Miyuki Otonashi, the biologist for the United Nations.
- Don Frye as Douglas Gordon, the current captain of Gotengo and a member of the Earth Defense Forces.
  - Tesshō Genda voices Gordon in the Japanese version.
- Maki Mizuno as Anna Otonashi, a journalist and Miyuki's sister.
- Kazuki Kitamura as the Xilien Controller, the second-in-command of the Xiliens.
- Kane Kosugi as Katsunori Kazama, a mutant ensign in the Earth Defense Forces and pilot of the Gotengo.
- Kumi Mizuno as Reiko Namikawa, the commander of the Earth Defense Forces.
- Kenji Sahara as Dr. Hachiro Jinguji.
- Masami Nagasawa and Chihiro Otsuka as the Shobijin, the priestesses of Mothra.
- Shigeru Izumiya as Samon Taguchi, an elderly game hunter and Kenta's grandfather.
- Masakatsu Funaki as Kumasaka, the commander and the instructor of the Earth Defense Forces.
- Kenji Kohashi as himself, nicknamed X.
- Masatō Ibu (Note: Credited as Masatoh Eve) as the Xilien Commander, the commander of the Xiliens who is killed by the Controller. Ibu previously portrayed Motohiko Sugiura in Godzilla vs. Megaguirus.
- Jun Kunimura as Komura, first officer of the Gotengo in the opening sequence.
- Akira Takarada as Naotaro Daigo, Secretary-General of the United Nations.
- Kenta Suga as Kenta Taguchi, Samon's grandson who befriends Minilla.
- Akira Nakao as the original captain of Gotengo in the opening sequence. Nakao previously portrayed Takaaki Aso in the Godzilla series' Heisei era and Hayato Igarashi in Godzilla Against Mechagodzilla and Godzilla: Tokyo S.O.S..
- Shirō Sano as the man who attempts to assault Daigo imposter. Sano previously portrayed Haruki Kadokura in Godzilla, Mothra and King Ghidorah: Giant Monsters All-Out Attack.
- Koh Takasugi as Li Xiang, Chinese captain of Karyu.
- Shelley Sweeney as French captain of Eclair.

=== Monsters ===
- Tsutomu Kitagawa as Godzilla, also known by his title "The King of the Monsters", the mutant dinosaurian creature who was awakened by nuclear testing in 1954 and got imprisoned under the ice in Antarctica for many decades.
- Naoko Kamio as Minilla, Godzilla's son who accompanies Kenta and Samon to reunite with his father.
  - Kamio also portrays Rodan, the irradiated Pteranodon controlled by the Xiliens to attacks New York City.
- Kazuhiro Yoshida as Gigan, an extraterrestrial cyborg and the Xilliens' ancient bioweapon.
  - Yoshida also portrays Hedorah, the smog monster controlled by the Xiliens but got killed along with Ebirah by Godzilla.
- Motokuni Nakagawa as Monster X, a skeletal three-headed dragon and the Xilliens' ultimate weapon. Nakagawa previously portrayed Kiryu in Tokyo S.O.S..
  - Nakagawa also portrays King Caesar, an Okinawan guardian monster controlled by the Xiliens to attacks his home island.
- Toshihiro Ogura as Keizer Ghidorah, (Note: Credited as Monster X II) the true form of Monster X. Its appearance is similar to King Ghidorah.
  - Ogura also portrays Anguirus, the irradiated ankylosaur, and Ebirah, the mutant crustacean monster, both controlled by the Xiliens to attack Shanghai and Tokai respectively.

Baragon, Gaira, Gezora, Varan, Titanosaurus, Godzilla Junior and Megaguirus make a cameo in the film via archive footage from Frankenstein vs. Baragon, The War of the Gargantuas, Space Amoeba, Varan the Unbelievable, Terror of Mechagodzilla, Godzilla vs. Destoroyah and Godzilla vs. Megaguirus, respectively.

== Production ==
=== Development ===
Godzilla's new design for Godzilla: Final Wars dubbed the FinalGoji.

Ryuhei Kitamura accepted the offer to direct the film due to being unsatisfied with the Godzilla films of the 1960s, and 2000s, stating, "I loved the Godzilla movies back in the ’70s and '90s, but not so much the ones released in the 1960s and 2000s. Godzilla movies back in the ’70s were never just monster movies, there were always messages and themes that reflected and the '90s the time and world within which they were made, and they combined this so well with straight-out entertainment. They lost that touch in the 1980 years like 2000s".

Kitamura has compared Godzilla: Final Wars to that of a musician's "Best of" album, stating "We picked lots and lots of the best elements from the past and combined it in a new way. It's what I love about Godzilla and what I don't love about recent Godzilla movies".

Kitamura initially aimed to cast Jean Reno, who appeared in the 1998 Hollywood Godzilla film. The role was subsequently offered to Christopher Lambert and Sonny Chiba before Kitamura decided to cast a professional wrestler or mixed martial artist instead, a search that led him to Don Frye.

=== Post-production ===
Like previous Godzilla films, Godzilla: Final Wars makes extensive use of practical effects rather than CGI. The special effects were directed and supervised by Eiichi Asada, who also directed the special effects for Godzilla: Tokyo S.O.S. Commenting on the special effects, Kitamura stated at the film's world premiere in Hollywood, "We stick to the special effects. That’s what we've been doing for 50 years. And that’s why Hollywood doesn’t do it. So on the first meeting, I told everybody that we stick to the special effects, and the live action instead of CGI. So it's a CGI-monster-Hollywood Godzilla versus our man-made live-action monsters."

=== Filming ===
Filming included on-location shooting in New York City and Sydney, Australia. Scenes were also filmed in various locations across Japan, including Fukushima, Kobe, and Toho Studios in Tokyo.

== Music ==
The film's score was composed by Keith Emerson, Nobuhiko Morino, and Daisuke Yano. Emerson was offered the job by Kitamura, who was attending Emerson's Japanese concerts at the time. Emerson's main concern was the potential lack of time before going on tour. Emerson was only given two weeks to write the score and ended up writing more music than what was used in the film. The film featured the track "We're All to Blame" by Sum 41 during the battle between Godzilla and Zilla. The band received top billing in the opening credits.

== Release ==
Godzilla: Final Wars was distributed theatrically by Toho in Japan on November 29, 2004. It was released theatrically in the United States on November 4, 2004 and then released to video on December 13, 2005.

=== Critical response ===
On the review aggregator website Rotten Tomatoes, 47% of 15 critics' reviews are positive, with an average rating of 5.9/10.

Steve Biodrowski of Cinefantastique called the film "utterly fantastic" and "a rush of explosive excitement." Jim Agnew of Film Threat gave the film four and a half stars out of five, saying "the good news for kaiju fans is that Godzilla: Final Wars is a kick-ass giant monster flick." Drew McWeeny of Ain't It Cool News remarked, "Godzilla: Final Wars earns a special place in my heart. It's fun. Pure lunatic fun, every frame." Sean Axmaker of Static Multimedia said, "Directed by a true fan of the old school, it's lusciously, knowingly, lovingly cheesy." Craig Blamer of the Chico News & Review called the film "a giddy and fast-paced celebration of the big guy."

Conversely, David Nusair of Reel Film gave the film one and a half stars out of five, saying that "the battles are admittedly quite entertaining" but felt that director Ryuhei Kitamura "is absolutely the wrong choice for the material." David Cornelius of eFilmCritic gave the film two stars out of five, calling it "the dullest, weakest Godzilla movie I've seen in a long, long time." Ty Burr of the Boston Globe gave the film one and a half stars out of five, saying it focused too much on action and not enough on story, and calling it "20 minutes longer than is necessary."

Among kaiju-related websites, J.L. Carrozza of Toho Kingdom "absolutely love[d]" Final Wars, saying "[it's] no masterpiece, but it is such insane fun that quite frankly it's hard not to adore it." Mike Bogue of American Kaiju said "the film is flawed, but nonetheless entertaining," saying there are "too many [Matrix-style] battles" but that the film "makes excellent use of its monsters" and "Kitamura keeps things moving at a brisk pace." Japan Hero criticized the "[lack of] character development" but concluded that Final Wars is "a very entertaining movie," saying that "Kitamura did a wonderful job making it an interesting and great looking film worthy of being the final [Godzilla] movie."

Stomp Tokyo said "the monster scenes are generally well done" but criticized the film's "incoherence," saying: "It's a shame that Kitamaura couldn't choose a tone for the film, instead shifting the movie's mood wildly from scene to scene." Lenny Taguchi of Monster Zero criticized Keith Emerson's soundtrack but gave Final Wars an overall favorable review, calling it a "fun and good" movie that "tries many things, and generally succeeds at almost all of them."

Director Kitamura commented at the film's world premiere that the reason why he agreed to direct the film was because he wanted to update Godzilla and recapture the same spirit seen in the later Godzilla films from the Showa era. He wanted to incorporate the same speed and power seen in films like Godzilla vs. Mechagodzilla, which he believed was lost somewhere within the series, stating, "The Godzilla series had lost that kind of taste. I think that back in the '70s Godzilla movies had more power and speed. He was very fast and he was very strong. So in my Godzilla, you know, less dialogue and more action. That’s more fun than watching people discuss what we should do about Godzilla. As a Godzilla fan I want to see Godzilla punching and kicking, beating up all the other monsters instead of somebody talking again, you know, just discussing. Showing the monsters, in order to understand their story, and why they end up like this, was a crucial choice for this film. That's what I wanted to do is to revive that, but not in the same way, I have to update. This is the updated version of '60 & 70s, monster movies. I hope that the Americans will not modify the Japanese version too much."

=== Awards ===
Year	Award	Category	Recipient	Result
2005	Neuchâtel International Fantasy Film Festival	Best Feature Film	Godzilla: Final Wars	Won
2006	Fangoria Chainsaw Awards	Most Disturbing Import (Scariest Foreign Film)	Godzilla: Final Wars	Won

== Legacy ==
A series of suitmation short films produced for the Godzilla Fest events (2021-2024) would use replicas of the Godzilla and Hedorah suits from Godzilla: Final Wars.

== Home media ==
Sony Pictures Home Entertainment

- Released: December 13, 2005
- Aspect Ratio: Widescreen (2.40:1) Anamorphic
- Sound: Japanese (Dolby Digital 5.1) English (Dolby Digital 5.1)
- Subtitles: English and French
- Supplements: Behind-the-Scenes Featurette (comparison of B-roll footage to finished film)(17:53 min); Trailers for Final Fantasy VII Advent Children, Steamboy, Dust to Glory, MirrorMask, and Madison
- Region 1
- MPAA Rating: Rated PG-13 for Intense Sequences of Violence.

Sony – Blu-ray (Toho Godzilla Collection)

- Released: May 6, 2014
- Picture: 2.40:1 (MPEG-4 AVC) [1080P]
- Sound: Japanese and English (DTS-HD Master Audio 5.1)
- Subtitles: English, English SDH, and French
- Extras:
- Godzilla: B-Roll to Film (SD, Japanese DD 2.0, English subtitles, 17:54)
- Theatrical Trailer (Japanese DD 2.0, English subtitles, 2:11, HD)
- Teaser 1 (Japanese DD 2.0, English subtitles, 0:41, HD)
- Teaser 2 (Japanese DD 2.0, English subtitles, 0:41, HD)
- Teaser 3 (Japanese DD 2.0, English subtitles, 0:42, HD)
- Notes: This is a 2-Disc double feature with Godzilla: Tokyo SOS.

== See also ==
- Invasion of Astro-Monster
- Destroy All Monsters
