= Jereh Group =

Chinese oil field services company and manufacturer

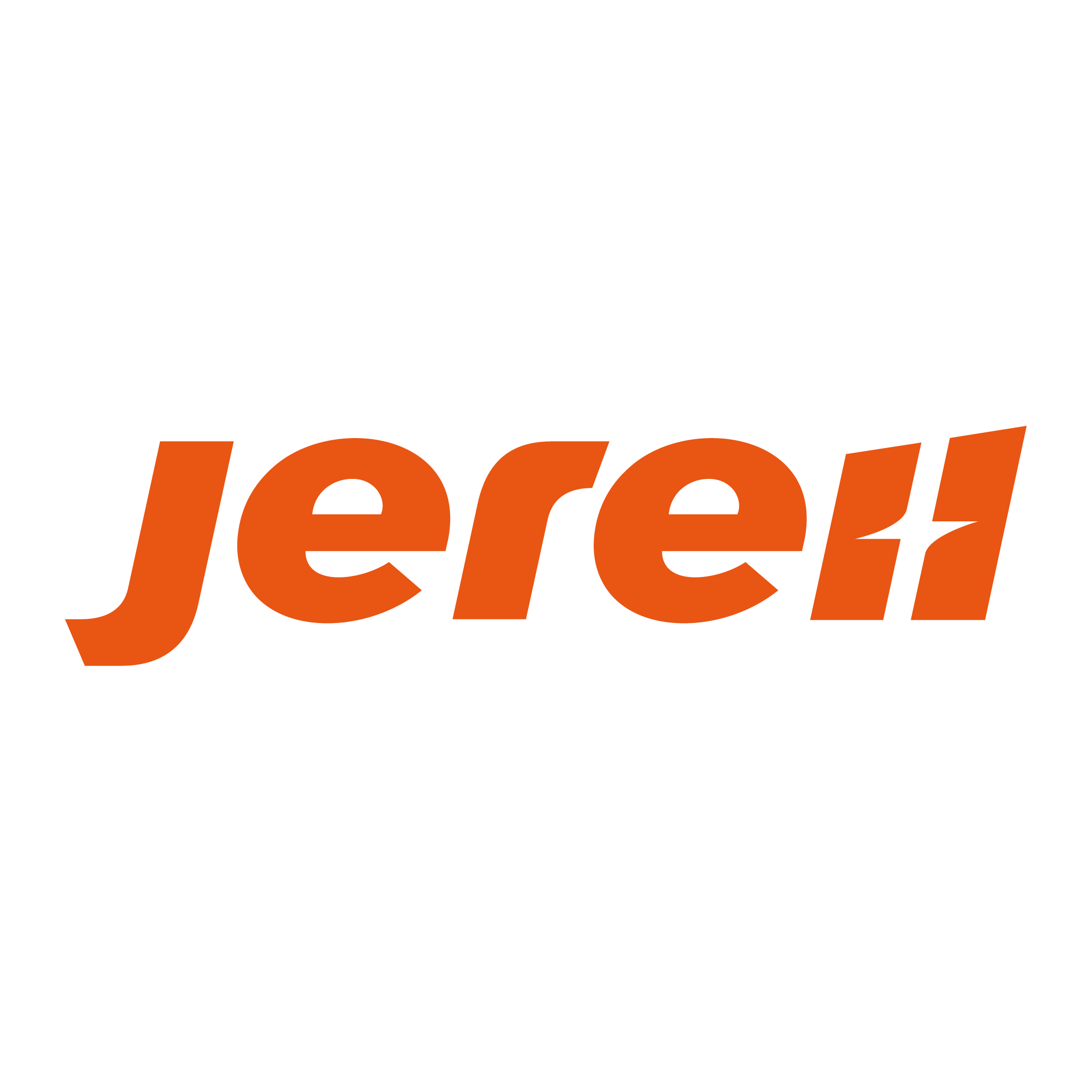
- Trade name: Yantai Jereh Oilfield Services Group Co., Ltd.
- Industry: Oilfield services
- Headquarters: Yantai, China
- Key people: Sun Weijie (CEO)
- Products: Drill rigs, cementers, frac spread, coiled tubing unit, nitrogen pumper, intelligent pipe handling system, snubbing units, hot oilers, coiled tubing injectors and blow out preventers, natural gas compression package, natural gas equipment, compressors, LNG equipment, wellhead equipment, downhole motors and related equipment.
- Number of employees: 5,847
- Website: www.jereh.com

The Jereh Group (simplified Chinese: 杰瑞集团; traditional Chinese: 傑瑞集團; SZSE: 002353) known as Yantai Jereh Oilfield Services Group Co., Ltd. and formerly Jereh Oilfield Services or Yantai Jereh is a Chinese oil field services company and manufacturer of oilfield equipment.

== History ==
In 1999, Sun Weijie, Wang Kunxiao and Liu Zhenfeng established "Yantai Jereh Equipment Co., Ltd." to engage in the trade of imported mining accessories. Established American Jereh Corporation in 2008. Listed on the Shenzhen Stock Exchange in 2010. In 2015, Established Jereh Environmental Technology Corporation, focusing on oilfield sludge treatment, sludge dewatering and soil remediation. In 2021, Established Jereh New Energy Technology Co., Ltd. to enter the field of anode materials for lithium-ion batteries. Its market capitalization reached around $7 billion in 2015. It was listed as the No. 246 of Hurun China 500 with a market value of US$4.29 billion in 2019. It was listed as the No. 418 of Hurun China 500 with a market value of US$4.2 billion in 2020. It was listed as the No. 408 of Hurun China 500 with a market value of US$5.9 billion in 2021. It was listed as the No. 397 of Hurun China 500 with a market value of US$4.9 billion in 2022.

== Markets ==
Jereh is one of the largest domestic oilfield equipment and service providers. It has a domestic market share of about half for shale drilling equipment. The first automated slurry mixing skid of Jereh entered U.S. market in 2007.

== Projects ==
Kuwait-Awarded contract by Kuwait Oil Company (KOC), Jurassic Production Facilities 5 for testing, processing and handling of wet and sour hydrocarbon wells fluids from Jurassic Fields.

Venezuela-In January 2013, 970 sets of Jereh oilfield equipment, which worth $178 million, are ordered for PDVSA's first oil & gas service business.
