= Jira Payne =

American politician

Member of the Michigan House of Representatives from the Lenawee County district
- In office January 1, 1838 – April 6, 1838

Jira Payne was a Michigan politician.

== Career ==
Payne was the owner of Atlas sawmill. On November 6, 1837, Payne was elected to the Michigan House of Representatives where he represented the Lenawee County district from January 1, 1838 to April 6, 1838. During his time in the legislature, Payne served on three committees: Internal Improvement, Banks and Incorporations, and Library.

== Pomeroy Hall ==
In 1840, Payne built a Greek Revival house known as the Pomeroy Hall. The house served as a social center for Payne's residence of Clinton, Michigan. In 1988, the house was listed as a Michigan State Historic Site.
