= Chianeh, Piranshahr =

Village in West Azerbaijan province, Iran

Chianeh Persian: چيانه
- Village
- Location within Iran
- Coordinates: 36°37′15″N 45°11′11″E
- Country: Iran
- Province: West Azerbaijan
- County: Piranshahr
- District: Central
- Rural District: Piran

Population (2016)
  - Total: 347
- Time zone: UTC+3:30 (IRST)

Chianeh (Persian: چيانه) (Note: Also romanized as Cheyānah and Chīāneh) is a village in, and the capital of, Piran Rural District in the Central District of Piranshahr County, West Azerbaijan province, Iran.

== Demographics ==
=== Population ===
At the time of the 2006 National Census, the village's population was 390 in 63 households. The following census in 2011 counted 356 people in 85 households. The 2016 census measured the population of the village as 347 people in 89 households.
