= Gazgasak, Piran =

Village in West Azerbaijan province, Iran

Gazgasak Persian: گزگسك
- Village
- Location within Iran
- Coordinates: 36°38′03″N 45°09′19″E
- Country: Iran
- Province: West Azerbaijan
- County: Piranshahr
- District: Central
- Rural District: Piran

Population (2016)
  - Total: 747
- Time zone: UTC+3:30 (IRST)

Gazgasak (Persian: گزگسك) (Note: Also known as Gargask and Gazkask) is a village in Piran Rural District of the Central District in Piranshahr County, West Azerbaijan province, Iran.

== Demographics ==
=== Population ===
At the time of the 2006 National Census, the village's population was 915 in 155 households. The following census in 2011 counted 918 people in 193 households. The 2016 census measured the population of the village as 747 people in 183 households.
