= Godzilla (TriStar) =

Fictional monster, or kaiju

- Godzilla character
- TriStar's Godzilla (left) as featured in the 1998 film and Zilla (right) as featured in Godzilla: Final Wars.
- First appearance: Godzilla (1998)
- Last appearance: Godzilla: Final Wars (2004)
- Based on: Godzilla by Toho Co., Ltd.
- Adapted by: Dean Devlin; Roland Emmerich
- Designed by: Patrick Tatopoulos
- Portrayed by: Kurt Carley (suit actor)
- Voiced by: Scott Martin Gershin; Gary A. Hecker; Frank Welker (vocal effects)

In-universe information
- Aliases: Godzilla '98; TriStar Godzilla; American Godzilla; Godzilla-USA; French Godzilla; G.I.N.O
- Gender: Male
- Children: Baby Godzillas; Godzilla (Godzilla: The Series)

Godzilla (/ɡɒdˈzɪlə/ ɡod-ZIL-ə) (Note: Japanese: ゴジラ, Hepburn: Gojira; IPA: [ɡoꜜʑiɾa]) is a giant monster, or kaiju, based on Toho Co., Ltd.'s character of the same name. The character first appeared in the 1998 film Godzilla, released by TriStar Pictures. Designed by Patrick Tatopoulos, he was modeled after iguanas with a slim theropod appearance rather than the thick, bipedal designs of Toho's Godzilla. He is the second incarnation of Godzilla to be created by an American studio, after Hanna-Barbera's 1978 animated series Godzilla.

Initial reception towards the 1998 film and its version of Godzilla were generally negative, however, both would receive reappraise in later years. Reception for the animated sequel Godzilla: The Series was more favorable. For the 2004 film Godzilla: Final Wars, Toho featured a new iteration of TriStar's Godzilla as Zilla (ジラ, Jira). That version has since appeared in various media under the "Zilla" trademark, but the variants from the 1998 film and Godzilla: The Series retain the Godzilla copyright and trademark.

== Development ==
=== TriStar Godzilla (1998–2000) ===
A suit was produced for the adult Godzilla for certain sequences. Kurt Carley served as the suit performer.

During the production of the 1998 film, special effects artist Patrick Tatopoulos was contacted by director Roland Emmerich and asked to create a new design for the Godzilla character. According to Tatopoulos, the only specific instructions Emmerich gave him was that he should be able to run incredibly fast. Emmerich intended to depict the character as an animal rather than a monster. Godzilla was originally conceived by special effects director Eiji Tsubaraya, special effects designers Akira Wantanabe and Teizo Toshimitsu and producer Tomoyuki Tanaka as a robust, erect-standing, plantigrade reptilian sea monster, played by an actor in a rubber-latex full-body suit. Based on the instructions Emmerich gave him, Tatopoulos reimagined him as a lean, digitigrade bipedal iguana who stood with his back and tail parallel to the ground, rendered via computer animation. The monster's distinctive facial features include a prominent lantern jaw, inspired by the fictional tiger Shere Khan from Disney's animated adaptation of The Jungle Book.

TriStar's Godzilla color scheme was designed to reflect and blend in with the urban environment. At one point, it was planned that motion capture would be used to create the movements of the computer-generated monster, though he ended up looking too much like a man in a suit. The Baby Godzilla scenes utilized a combination of CGI and purpose built costumes donned by actors. Kurt Carley portrayed the suitmation sequences for the adult Godzilla in the 1998 film while voice actor Frank Welker, foley artist Gary A. Hecker, and the film's sound designer Scott Martin Gershin provided additional vocals for both Godzilla and his offspring. Upon pending approval for the design, at the time, Shōgo Tomiyama commented on the new look, saying "It was so different we realized we couldn't make small adjustments. That left the major question of whether to approve it or not." Though TriStar's Godzilla was referred to by the film's characters as a "he", Patrick Tatopoulos stated on a DVD audio commentary that the effects crew sculpted female genitalia into the CG model of the creature.

In the 1998 film and animated series, TriStar's Godzilla is portrayed as a territorial, piscivorous, 180 feet (54.86 m) tall mutated lizard. Atypical of Toho's giant monster characters, TriStar's Godzilla is not immune to conventional weaponry, and instead relies on his cunning and athleticism to outflank his enemies. He can travel long distances over land and sea, burrow underground, and, reproducing asexually via parthenogenesis, able to lay over 200 eggs, unlike his offspring in the animated series, Zilla Jr., who was unable to reproduce. He possesses an ignitable radioactive breath weapon called "Power Breath", although his offspring could breathe a green atomic Power Breath in the animated series (where the parent Godzilla is resurrected as a cyborg called Cyber-Godzilla who possessed a blue version), in which he was pitted against a rogues gallery of original monsters, after the producers were unable to secure the rights to adapt Toho's classic monsters. He was also featured in advertisements alongside the Taco Bell chihuahua.

=== Zilla (2004–present) ===
Early concept artwork depicting the showdown between Godzilla and Zilla in Godzilla: Final Wars.

During production of Godzilla: Final Wars, director Ryuhei Kitamura asked producer Shōgo Tomiyama whether or not they were allowed to include TriStar's Godzilla in the film. Tomiyama checked Toho's contract with Sony and saw they were allowed to use him, stating, "since this was the 50th anniversary film, I thought 'Why not include the American Godzilla?'" This incarnation of TriStar's Godzilla was named "Zilla". This decision was made because they also felt that Emmerich's film had taken the "God" out of "Godzilla" by portraying the character as a mere animal, however, Kitamura admitted to "liking" the 1998 film and Emmerich's works. The name "Zilla" was chosen for the character by Tomiyama as a satirical take on counterfeit Godzilla products that use "Zilla" as a suffix. In the film, Zilla is one of many monsters controlled by the Xilliens in their invasion against Earth who engages Godzilla in a battle in Sydney before he is quickly defeated by him. A 3D scan of the Trendmasters "Ultimate Godzilla" toy was used as reference for Zilla.

Zilla would fight Godzilla again in a slightly longer battle, and even team up with Godzilla to fight other monsters, in the comic series by IDW Publishing titled Godzilla: Rulers of Earth running between 2013 and 2015.

The "Zilla" trademark has led to confusion from fans over Toho's treatment of TriStar's Godzilla and the possibilities of rebranding. Matt Frank (co-writer and illustrator of Godzilla: Rulers of Earth) clarified, "Toho makes zero distinction between 'Zilla' and 'Godzilla 1998' with the exception of title alone. Ever since 2004, Toho's official stance has been that any future incarnations of the character be referred to hereafter as 'Zilla'." Keith Aiken (co-editor of SciFi Japan) also clarified that "'Zilla' is a variation of the '1998 Godzilla' but stressed that only the incarnations from the 1998 film and the animated series retain the Godzilla copyright and trademark.

== Reception ==
Godzilla as featured in the animated TV series Godzilla: The Series. The series served as a sequel to the 1998 film and had a more favorable response from fans.

The design and characterization of TriStar's Godzilla was negatively received. Film critic Richard Pusateri of G-Fan Magazine coined the acronym GINO ("Godzilla In Name Only") to distinguish him from Toho's Godzilla. Other publications referred to him as the "American Godzilla".

Tom Breihan from Deadspin stated that TriStar's Godzilla "wasn't motherfucking Godzilla at all," elaborating that he was treated like a "tapped animal" who lacked Godzilla's atomic breath, ran and hid, and caused less damage, expressing that Emmerich and Devlin had "completely missed the entire point" of Godzilla.

These sentiments were echoed by veteran Godzilla suit actors Haruo Nakajima and Kenpachiro Satsuma; Nakajima ridiculed the design of TriStar’s Godzilla and said that his face “looks like an iguana” and his body and limbs “look like a frog”, while Satsuma walked out of the film due to the character lacking Godzilla’s “spirit". Shusuke Kaneko also expressed criticism, opining that Americans “seem unable to accept a creature that cannot be put down by their arms", and later alluded to the character in his film Godzilla, Mothra and King Ghidorah: Giant Monsters All-Out Attack as a monster that Americans mistook for Godzilla. Toho publicist Yosuke Ogura later called TriStar's design a "disaster."

Thomas Tull, the producer of Legendary’s Monsterverse, another collection of American Godzilla media, criticized the design of TriStar's Godzilla, stating, "I'm always puzzled as a fan when you take things so far it's unrecognizable."

The negative response to Emmerich's Godzilla, as well as the Disney remake of Mighty Joe Young released that same year, had caused giant monster movies to fall out of vogue for several years after, with films such as Peter Jackson's King Kong remake being postponed until 2005. Poor merchandise sales for the film led to the cancellation of a toy line based on Godzilla: The Series, and resulted in significant financial losses for toy manufacturer Trendmasters. Nicholas Raymond from Screen Rant described Toho's subsequent treatment of TriStar's Godzilla as "a clear sign that Toho doesn't regard the 1998 Godzilla as the King of the Monsters. It would appear that to them, he's just a giant lizard."

In later years, the 1998 film and its version of Godzilla would receive reappraise from journalist and fans that grew up with the film. Ten years after the film's release, director and co-writer Roland Emmerich felt the film was better than what critics said it was and said that the film is a favorite amongst his friends' kids. While promoting Godzilla: Final Wars, director Ryuhei Kitamura admitted that he "liked" both the 1998 film and Emmerich's films. In 2024, filmmaker Takashi Yamazaki, director and writer of Toho's 2023 film Godzilla Minus One, spoke favorably of the 1998 film. He felt that on its own merits, the 1998 film is "fun" and "quite well executed" and was technologically a huge achievement but understood why some are hesitant to consider it part of the franchise.

Despite the 1998 film's initial negative reception, its animated sequel Godzilla: The Series earned successful ratings and was more popular with fans of Toho's Godzilla.

== Appearances ==
TriStar's Godzilla has been featured in other media outside of TriStar-produced content under various aliases.

TriStar's Godzilla has only made two film appearances in Godzilla (1998) and Godzilla: Final Wars (2004) and was vaguely referenced in Godzilla, Mothra and King Ghidorah: Giant Monsters All-Out Attack (2001). TriStar originally planned to produce a trilogy, and Tab Murphy was commissioned by Emmerich and Devlin to write a story treatment for Godzilla 2. However, the sequels were cancelled due to the 1998 film's poor reception and TriStar let their remake/sequel rights expire on May 20, 2003. An animated television series, Godzilla: The Series, was produced instead and served as a sequel to the 1998 film. It featured the surviving offspring from the 1998 film as the new Godzilla, as well as a reanimated cyborg version of its parent, named "Cyber-Godzilla".

For the video games Godzilla: Save the Earth and Godzilla: Unleashed, developer Simon Strange decided not to include Zilla due to the character's unpopularity among fans. Strange received criticism from fans for not including Zilla in Godzilla: Unleashed. In 2024, the children's web series Godziban introduced a bright pink female character based on Zilla named "Zillala" as a co-host for its Go! Godzi Godzi BANBAN segment.

=== Films ===
- Godzilla (1998)
- Godzilla: Final Wars (2004) — as Zilla

=== Television ===
- Godzilla: The Series (1998–2000) — with Cyber-Godzilla
- Godziban (2019–present) — as Zillala

=== Video games ===
- Godzilla Online (CD-ROM — 1998)
- Godzilla – The Aftermath (Online — 1998)
- G-Patrol VR Combat Simulator (Online — 1998)
- Godzilla (LCD — 1998)
- Godzilla: Virtual Shakin' (LCD — 1998)
- Godzilla (Pinball — 1998)
- Godzilla Trading Battle (PlayStation — 1998)
- Godzilla Generations (Dreamcast — 1998) — as Godzilla-USA
- Godzilla: The Series (Game Boy Color — 1999)
- Godzilla: The Series – Monster Wars (Game Boy Color — 2000)
- Godzilla: Kaiju Collection (Android, iOS — 2015) — as Zilla

=== Literature ===
- Godzilla by Stephen Molstad (novel — 1998)
- Godzilla by H. B. Gilmour (novel — 1998)
- Godzilla: A Junior Novelization by H. B. Gilmour (novel — 1998)
- Godzilla by Kimberly Weinberger (book — 1998)
- Godzilla: Attack of the Baby Godzillas by Gina Shaw (book — 1998)
- Fox Kids Magazine — Godzilla: The Series (comic – 1998)
- Godzilla: Rulers of Earth (comic — 2013–2015) — as Zilla
- Godzilla: Oblivion (comic — 2016) — as Zilla
- Godzilla: Monster Apocalypse (novel — 2017) — as Zilla

=== Toys ===
Prior to release of the 1998 film, anticipation for the film was high and several companies licensed merchandise from both Sony and Toho, expecting the film to be the biggest hit of the year. While products sold well initially, they began to decline after the film's release; the decline in sales was attributed to the film's negative reception from critics, audiences, fans, and theater owners. As a result, several retailers were stuck with unsold merchandise, and a toy-line, based on the animated series, by Trendmasters was cancelled due to low advanced orders from retailers.

In 2023, Spiral Studios licensed the character from Toho as "Zilla" for a 124 cm statue, sculpted by Tanaka Kenichi, for their Legacy lineup. In 2024, Bandai released two versions of the character for their Movie Monster Series line; one as Godzilla (1998) and the other as Zilla (2004). In 2026, Spiral Studios announced to have acquired the character as "Godzilla (1998)" for a 65 cm. statue, also to be sculpted by Tanaka; it is expected to be released in late 2026 or early 2027. Gino Acevedo, who worked on the 1998 film as a creature paint designer and supervisor, consulted on the coloration and surface treatment.

== See also ==
- Godzilla (Monsterverse)
- Godzilla (1978 TV series)

== Bibliography ==
- Aberly, Rachel (1998). The Making of Godzilla. HarperPrism. ISBN 0061073172.
- Kalat, David (2010). A Critical History and Filmography of Toho's Godzilla Series (Second ed.). McFarland. ISBN 9780786447497.
- Molstad, Stephen (1998). Godzilla: The Novelization. HarperPrism. ISBN 0061059153.
- Oki, Renji (2017). Godzilla: Monster Apocalypse. Kadokawa. ISBN 9784041061817.
- Rickitt, Richard (2000). Special Effects: The History and Technique. Focal Press. ISBN 0823077330.
- Rickitt, Richard (2006). Designing Movie Creatures and Characters: Behind the Scenes with the Movie Masters. Focal Press. ISBN 0240808460.
- Ryfle, Steve (1998). Japan's Favorite Mon-Star: The Unauthorized Biography of the Big G. ECW Press. ISBN 1550223488.
