= Ziveh, Piranshahr =

Village in West Azerbaijan province, Iran

Ziveh Persian: زيوه
- Village
- Location within Iran
- Coordinates: 36°38′25″N 45°07′15″E
- Country: Iran
- Province: West Azerbaijan
- County: Piranshahr
- District: Central
- Rural District: Piran

Population (2016)
  - Total: 1,323
- Time zone: UTC+3:30 (IRST)

Ziveh (Persian: زيوه) (Note: Also romanized as Zīveh; also known as Zira) is a village in Piran Rural District of the Central District in Piranshahr County, West Azerbaijan province, Iran.

== Demographics ==
=== Population ===
At the time of the 2006 National Census, the village's population was 1,281 in 238 households. The following census in 2011 counted 1,423 people in 287 households. The 2016 census measured the population of the village as 1,323 people in 327 households. It was the most populous village in its rural district.
