= Piran Rural District =

Rural district in West Azerbaijan province, Iran

Piran Rural District Persian: دهستان پيران
- Rural District
- Location within Iran
- Coordinates: 36°40′N 45°06′E
- Country: Iran
- Province: West Azerbaijan
- County: Piranshahr
- District: Central
- Established: 1987
- Capital: Chianeh

Population (2016)
  - Total: 9,412
- Time zone: UTC+3:30 (IRST)

Piran Rural District (Persian: دهستان پيران) is in the Central District of Piranshahr County, West Azerbaijan province, Iran. Its capital is the village of Chianeh.

== Demographics ==
=== Population ===
At the time of the 2006 National Census, the rural district's population was 12,599 in 2,257 households. There were 15,676 inhabitants in 3,613 households at the following census of 2011. The 2016 census measured the population of the rural district as 9,412 in 2,226 households. The most populous of its 34 villages was Ziveh, with 1,323 people.

=== Other villages in the rural district ===
- Badinabad-e Piran
- Bandareh
- Gazgasak
- Kalehkin
- Kohneh Lahijan
- Naminjeh
- Piranshahr Garrison
- Qaleh Tarash
