= Zivi =

Zivi and related terms may refer to:

== German-language terms ==
- Zivilarbeiter ('civilian worker'), ethnic Polish forced laborers during World War II
- Zivildienst, alternative civilian service for conscientious objectors
  - Zivildienst in Austria
- "Zivi", a slang term for a plainclothes police officer

== Companies and organizations ==
- The Key of Croatia, a defunct political party formerly known as Živi zid ('Living Wall')
- Zivi-Hercules, a former Brazilian manufacturer now part of Mundial S.A.

== Movies ==
- That's the Way the Cookie Crumbles (Živi bili pa vidjeli), a 1979 Yugoslav movie
- The Living and the Dead (2007 film) (Živi i mrtvi), a 2007 Croatian horror movie

== Music ==
- Ljubav živi ('Love Lives'), a 2011 album by Serbian artist Ceca

== People ==
- Zivi Tzafriri (1927–1956), Israeli Armor Corps officer
- Zivion, pen name of Benzion Hoffman (1874–1954), Yiddish writer, journalist, and political activist

== See also ==
- Zevi
- Zini (disambiguation)
- ZPO (disambiguation)
- Ziva
- Zivia
- Zivica (disambiguation)
- Zivic
- Zivid
- Zivike
- Zivile
- Zivinice (disambiguation)
- Ziviyeh (disambiguation)
- Ziv (disambiguation)
- Zivy
- Zovi
