= Zivia =

Zivia is a given name derived from Hebrew. Notable people with the name include:

- Zivia Kay, an Israeli artist, researcher, and lecturer
- Zivia Lubetkin (1914–1978), a Jewish resistance leader in Nazi-occupied Poland

== See also ==
- Ziva
- Zivi (disambiguation)
- Ziveh (disambiguation)
- Zivic
- Zivid
- Zivin
