= Ziveh =

Ziveh or Zeyveh or Zivah (Persian: زيوه) may refer to:

- Ziveh, Germi, Ardabil Province
- Ziveh, Kermanshah
- Ziveh, Kurdistan
- Ziveh, Qorveh, Kurdistan Province
- Ziveh, Saqqez, Kurdistan Province
- Ziveh, Khoy, West Azerbaijan Province
- Ziveh, Mahabad, West Azerbaijan Province
- Ziveh, Piranshahr, West Azerbaijan Province
- Ziveh-ye Qureh, Piranshahr County, West Azerbaijan Province
- Ziveh Jik, Salmas County, West Azerbaijan Province
- Ziveh, Gavork-e Nalin, Sardasht County, West Azerbaijan Province
- Ziveh, Melkari, Sardasht County, West Azerbaijan Province
- Ziveh, Urmia, West Azerbaijan Province
- Ziveh, Silvaneh, Urmia County, West Azerbaijan Province
- Shahrak-e Ziveh, Urmia County, West Azerbaijan Province

== See also ==
- Ziviyeh (disambiguation)
