= Jack Axelrod =

American actor and architect (1930–2023)

- Born: January 25, 1930; Los Angeles, California, U.S.
- Died: November 26, 2023 (aged 93); Los Angeles, California, U.S.
- Occupations: Actor, architect, acting teacher
- Years active: 1966–2020

Jack Axelrod (January 25, 1930 – November 28, 2023) was an American actor, architect, and acting teacher. He worked extensively in theater before becoming known for supporting and guest roles in film and television. He appeared as Victor Jerome on the daytime soap opera General Hospital from 1987 to 1989, and later had recurring and guest roles on television series including My Name Is Earl and Grey's Anatomy. His film appearances included Woody Allen's Bananas (1971), Hancock (2008), Little Fockers (2010), Super 8 (2011), and The Lone Ranger (2013).

== Early life ==
Axelrod was born in Los Angeles, California, on January 25, 1930. Before establishing himself as an actor, he studied architecture at the University of California, Berkeley and became a licensed architect. His early professional experience included architectural work in Seattle.

A high-school teacher encouraged Axelrod to pursue architecture after noticing his abilities in drawing and mathematics. He obtained his architect's license in 1966. The same profile described his transition from architecture to acting and noted that he had appeared in 38 theatrical productions between 1967 and 1975.

Axelrod also spent time traveling, including a period in Chile, where he worked on a novel titled The Architect. He eventually moved toward a full-time career in acting in 1966. During his acting studies in New York, he studied with acting teacher Uta Hagen.

== Career ==
=== Theater ===
Axelrod's career was rooted in theater. His early stage work included regional theater and productions of Uncle Vanya, The Trial of the Catonsville 9, and The Miser. He later performed in productions in New York and across the United States.

Axelrod appeared on Broadway in the 1970 production of Gandhi, playing Jinnah Sahib. The production opened at the Playhouse Theatre on October 20, 1970, and closed after one performance. He subsequently appeared in the Broadway production of Herzl in 1976, playing Edouard Bacher and several other parts as an understudy.

In 1984, Axelrod played Barney in the Los Angeles Repertory Theatre production of Barry Pritchard's The Day Roosevelt Died, alongside Anne Gerety. The same period included his appearance as Webber, a theater manager, in the Long Beach Civic Light Opera production of Gypsy.

Axelrod subsequently appeared frequently in regional theater. In 1989, he played Nat in Pioneer Theatre Company's production of Herb Gardner's I'm Not Rappaport in Salt Lake City. The following year, he played Ben in Pioneer Theatre Company's production of Neil Simon's Broadway Bound.

In 1995, Axelrod played Sigmund Freud in the Pope Theatre Company's production of Terry Johnson's Hysteria. His performance was reviewed describing as combining humor with the character's suffering.

Axelrod later played Morrie Schwartz in productions of Tuesdays with Morrie, based on the memoir by Mitch Albom. In 2004, he appeared as Morrie at the Laguna Playhouse in Laguna Beach, California. Axelrod's portrayal of the character was reviewed as Morrie's physical condition deteriorates. In 2006, he again played Morrie in a Center Repertory Company production in Walnut Creek, California, an appearance that was the subject of a profile in J.

=== Film and television ===
Axelrod made his screen debut in Woody Allen's political comedy Bananas (1971), in which he played Lieutenant Arroyo. Axelrod later recalled his experience making the film in a 2006 interview, including his meeting with Allen and his work on the production in Puerto Rico.

His television career included guest and recurring appearances across drama and comedy series. His most substantial television role was Victor Jerome on the ABC daytime soap opera General Hospital, a role he played from 1987 to 1989. Axelrod later recalled that he had initially expected to work on the series for only a few days, but ultimately remained for approximately two and a half years.

Axelrod also appeared as the "Electrolarynx Guy" on the NBC comedy My Name Is Earl and as Charlie Yost, nicknamed "Really Old Guy", on Grey's Anatomy.

In Season 10 of the television series NCIS, he made three appearances as Ziva's elderly poet/philosopher/historian friend, and possible Israeli operative, Shmiel Pinkhas, first in Episode 8, Gone, airing November 2012; then, airing January 2013, Episode 11, Shabbat Shalom, and lastly Episode 12, Shiva.

His later film appearances included Hancock (2008), Little Fockers (2010), Super 8 (2011), J. Edgar (2011), and The Lone Ranger (2013).

=== Teaching ===
In addition to acting, Axelrod worked as an acting teacher at the University of Wisconsin–Green Bay and also discussed his earlier teaching at Brandeis University.

His teaching work continued alongside his acting career. His later professional biography listed teaching affiliations with a number of universities and acting programs.

== Death ==
Axelrod died in Los Angeles on November 28, 2023, at the age of 93. His death was attributed to natural causes, according to his representative.

== Filmography ==
=== Film ===
Year	Title	Role	Notes
1971	Bananas	Arroyo	
1985	The Incredible Sensorium	Professor Phineas Templeton Flagg	Short film
1990	Faith	Don Bassaro	
1997	Walking to Waldheim	Eddie Bromberg	Short film
1999	Through Thick and Thin	Gus	Short film
2000	Vice	Mr. Reinert	
2001	Road to Redemption	Arnold	
2008	Hancock	Convict	
2008	Winged Creatures	Sam	
2009	Labor Pains	O'Keefe	
2009	Table for Three	Musician #1	
2010	Little Fockers	Chappy	
2010	Ollie Klublershturf vs. the Nazis	Poppy Klublershturf	Short film
2011	Super 8	Mr. Blakely	
2011	Transformers: Dark of the Moon	Simmons Tileman	
2011	Fred & Vinnie	Leo	
2011	J. Edgar	Caminetti	
2013	Coffee Town	Elderly Man	
2013	The Lone Ranger	Telegraph Operator	
2015	Adulthood	Uncle Al	Independent Film
2020	Bad Therapy	Dr. Cherbenko	

=== Television ===
Year	Title	Role	Notes
1977	Kojak	Forensics Man	Episode: "Lady in the Squadroom"
1983–1984	Dallas	Mr. Dettinger	Episodes: "My Brother's Keeper" and "Blow Up"
1984	Hill Street Blues	Salesman	Episode: "The Count of Monty Tasco"
1985	Not My Kid	Harlan Crockett	Television film
1986	The Judge	Dr. Ben Foster	Episode: "There's No Place Like The Home"
1987	Dynasty	Charlie	Episode: "The Mothers"
1987	Outlaws	Livingston	Episode: "Potboiler"
1987–1989	General Hospital	Victor Jerome	40 episodes
1989	Night Court	Mr. Williams	Episode: "If I Were a Rich Man"
1989–1990	Knots Landing	Arnie Zimmer	3 episodes
1990	Hammer, Slammer, & Slade		Television film
1992	Murphy Brown	Leon, Gene's Tailor	Episode: "Rage Before Beauty"
1993	Love, Cheat & Steal	Mario Columbard	Television film
1999	Everybody Loves Raymond	Lodge Member	Episode: "Frank's Tribute"
1999	Boy Meets World	Organ Grinder	Episode: "You Light Up My Union"
1999	Good vs Evil	Jacobus Blitzer	Episode: "Cliffhanger"
1999	Jack & Jill	Husband	Episode: "She Ain't Heavy"
1999	Dharma & Greg	Bartender	Episode: "Lawyers, Beer and Money"
2000	Gideon's Crossing	Elderly Man	Episode: "The Mistake"
2000	Something to Sing About	Mr. Thompson	Television film
2000	Star Trek: Voyager	Chorus #1	Episode: "Muse"
2001	Alias	Giovanni Donato	Episode: "Time Will Tell"
2001	Philly	listed as "Unknown Character"	Episode: "Philly Folly"
2001	The Division	Mr. Kanter	Episode: "Seduced and Abandoned"
2002	In-Laws	Mr. Jenkins	Episode: "Love Thy Neighbor"
2003	It's All Relative	Uncle Paddy	Episode: "Waking Uncle Paddy"
2003	Frasier	Old Frasier	Episode: "The Devil & Dr. Phil"
2004	Blowing Smoke	Sid	Television film
2004	The Help	Grandpa Eddie	5 episodes
2005	Malcolm in the Middle	Sheldon	Episode: "Halloween"
2006	Christmas Do-Over	Elderly Neighbor	Television film
2006	It's Always Sunny in Philadelphia	Father O'Grady	Episode: "The Gang Exploits a Miracle"
2006	Scrubs	Italian Man	Episode: "My New Suit"
2005–2008	My Name Is Earl	Electrolarynx Guy / Old Man / Fake Father	8 episodes
2006–2007	Grey's Anatomy	Really Old Guy/ Charlie Yost	3 episodes
2009	Star-ving	Ira Silver	4 episodes
2009	Secret Girlfriend	Retired Golfer	Episode: "You Try To Make Some Internet Cash"
2010	Hawthorne	Burt	Episodes: "Afterglow" and "Hidden Truths"
2010	Private Practice	Oscar Schmitt	Episode: "Eyes Wide Open"
2011	Criminal Minds: Suspect Behavior	Janitor	Episodes: "Two of a Kind" and "Strays"
2011	Hot in Cleveland	Ernie	Episode: "Elka's Wedding"
2011	Love Bites	Little Old Man	Episode: "Stand and Deliver"
2011	Franklin & Bash	Old Man	Episode: "Bro-Bono"
2011	Dexter	Nelson	Episode: "This Is the Way the World Ends"
2012	The Beauty Inside	Alex #25	5 episodes
2012	Raising Hope	Henry	Episode: "Throw Maw Maw from the House, Part Two"
2012	Animal Practice	Old Man	Episode: "Who's Afraid of Virginia Coleman?"
2012	The Office	Old Man	Episode: "Test the Store"
2012	Shameless	Old Guy	Episode: "A Beautiful Mess"
2012–2013	NCIS	Shmeil Pinkhas	Episodes: "Gone" and "Shiva"
2013	Family Tools	Mr. Kurtz	Episode: "The Big Event"
2013	Hawaii Five-0	Ezra Clark	Episode: "Ho'onani Makuakane (Honor Thy Father)"
2014	Mulaney	Elderly Veteran	Episode: "The Doula"
2014	Mystery Girls	Bill Sanderson	Episode: "Death Rose"
2014	Legit	Old Man	Episode: "Racist"
2014	Kirstie	Hal Kleinman	Episode: "Maddie vs. Maddie"
2015	Playing House	listed as "Unknown Character"	Episode: "Employee of the Month"
2016	Gilmore Girls: A Year in the Life	Martin	Episode: "Winter"
2016	Ray Donovan	Leo	Episodes: "Fish and Bird" and "Norman Saves the World"
2016	Animals.	Old Mike (voice)	Episode: "Flies"
2016	Brooklyn Nine-Nine	Henry Coles	Episode: "The Cruise"
2017	Dice	Rabbi Marshak	Episodes: "It's a Miserable Life" and "The Trial"
2017	Baskets	Herb	Episodes: "Funeral" and "Yard Sale"
2018	Station 19	Mr. Paige	Episode: "Invisible to Me"
2018	Speechless	Older Man	Episode: "D-i-- Dimeo A-c-- Academy"
2018	No Activity	Steve	Episodes: "Good Cop, Tolbeck Cop", "Mr. X" and "Operation Meat Puppet"
2019	Modern Family	Harvey	Episode: "The Big Guns"
2019	Modern Family	Bert	Episode: "Can't Elope"

== Stage credits ==
Production	Role	Year / period
Gandhi	Jinnah Sahib	1970
Herzl	Edouard Bacher and others	1976
The Day Roosevelt Died	Barney	1984
Gypsy	Webber	1984
I'm Not Rappaport	Nat	1989
Broadway Bound	Ben	1990
Hysteria	Sigmund Freud	1995
Tuesdays With Morrie	Morrie Schwartz	2004, 2006
