= Star Wars (radio series) =

Series of three radio dramas based on Star Wars films

NPR Star Wars Radio Series promotional poster

A radio dramatization of the original Star Wars film trilogy was produced in 1981, 1983, and 1996. The first two radio series, based on Star Wars and The Empire Strikes Back, were produced and broadcast by National Public Radio (NPR) as part of NPR Playhouse. A dramatization of Return of the Jedi was produced by most of the same team and it was also broadcast on NPR.

The radio serials were made with the full cooperation of George Lucas, who, in exchange for a dollar each, sold the rights to KUSC-FM, the public radio affiliate at his alma mater, the University of Southern California (USC). Lucas also permitted the use of original sound effects and music from the films.

== Overview ==
Serial	Episodes	First aired	Last aired	Director(s)	Screenwriter(s)	Home station
Star Wars	13	March 2, 1981	May 25, 1981	John Madden	Brian Daley	NPR/KUSC
The Empire Strikes Back	10	February 14, 1983	April 25, 1983	John Madden	Brian Daley	NPR/KUSC
Return of the Jedi	6	November 5, 1996	December 1996	John Madden	Brian Daley	NPR/KUSC

== History ==
Radio drama lead cast

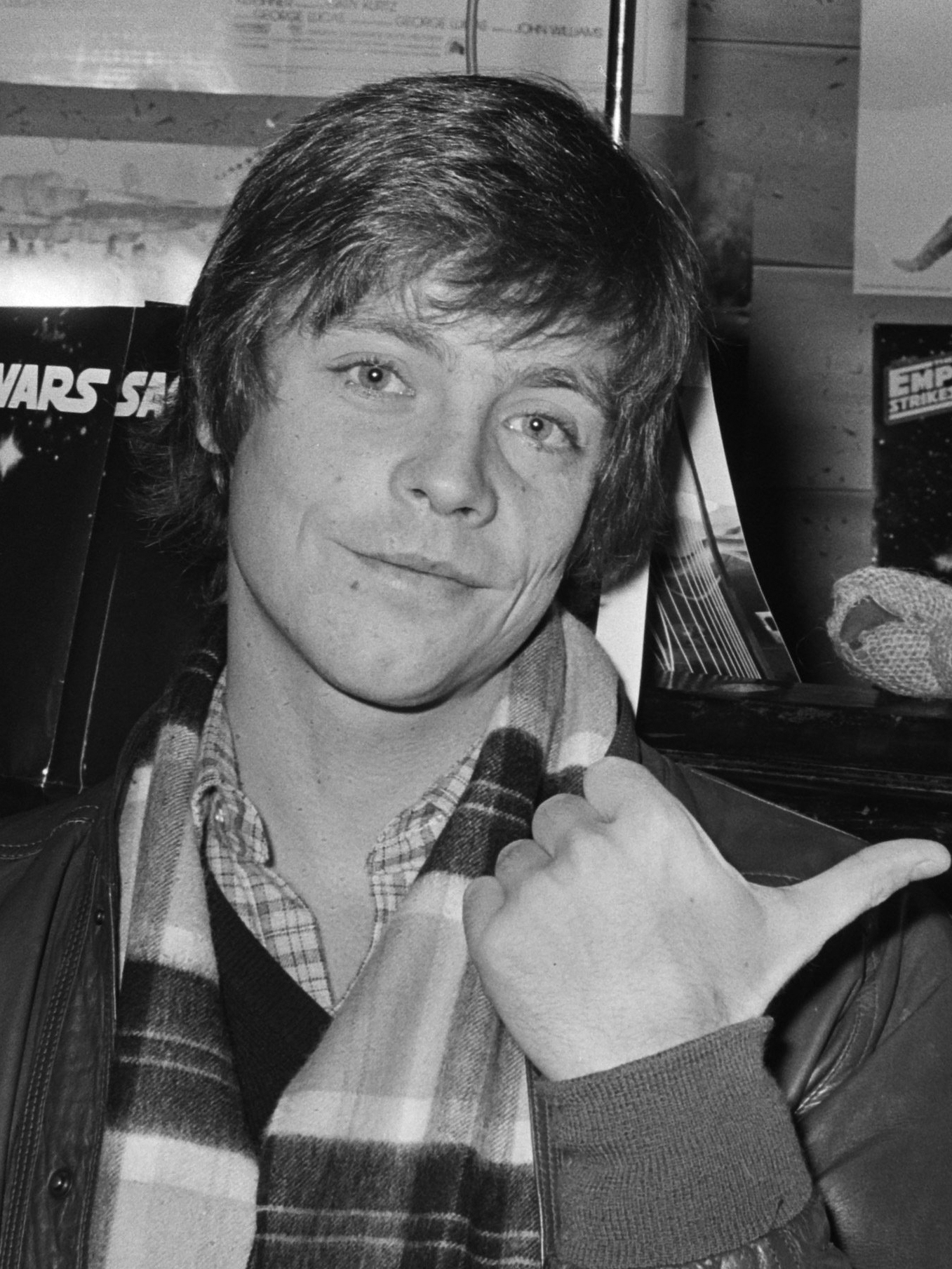
Mark Hamill

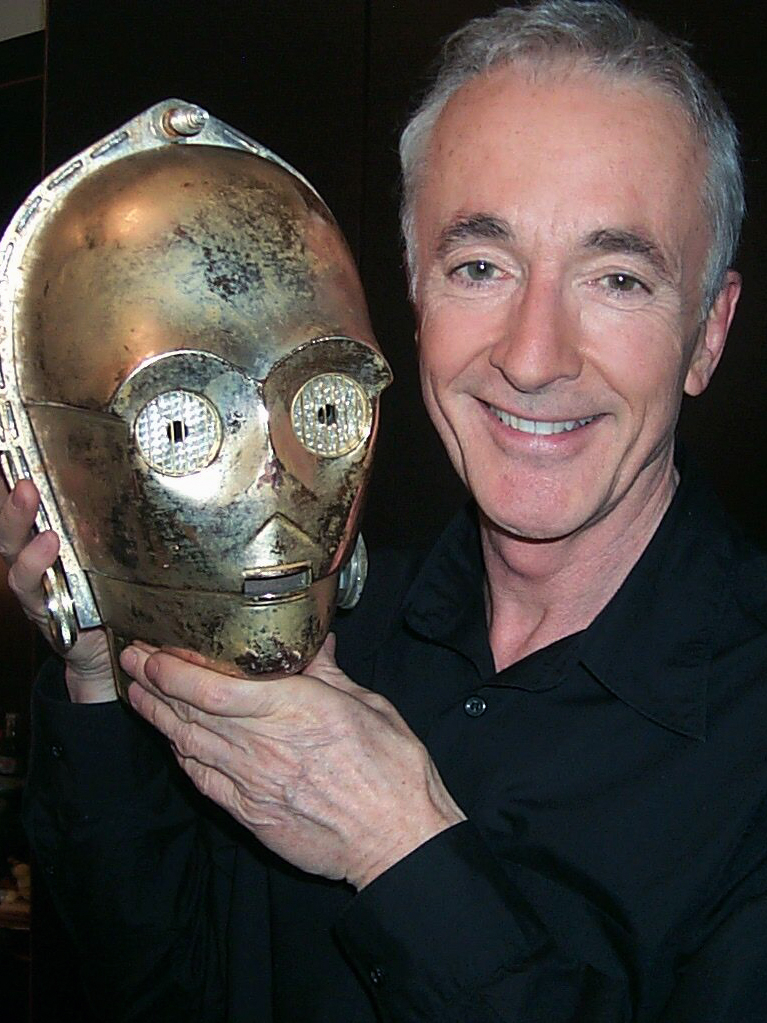
Anthony Daniels

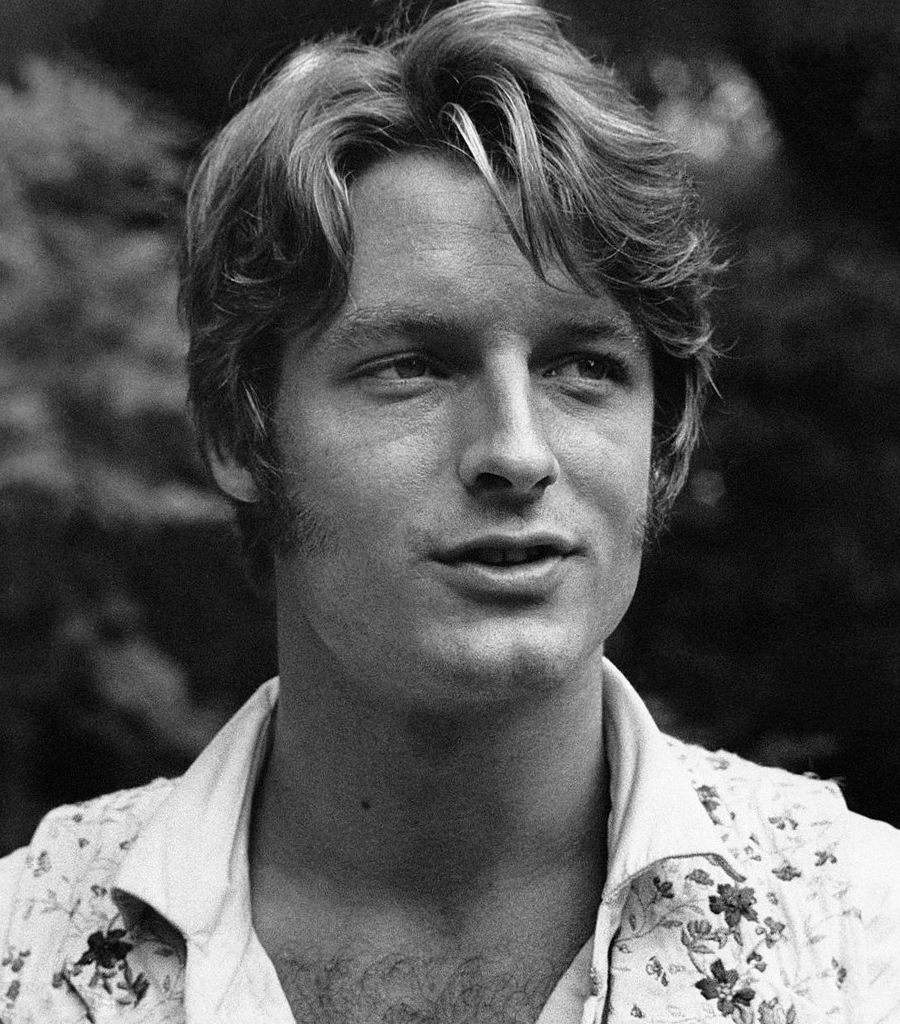
Perry King

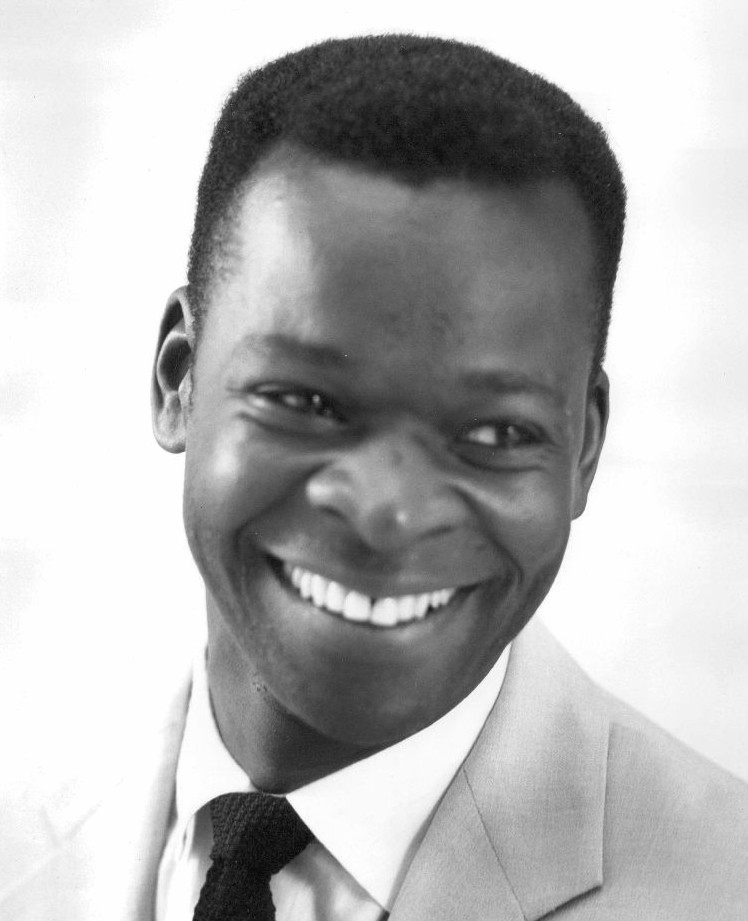
Brock Peters

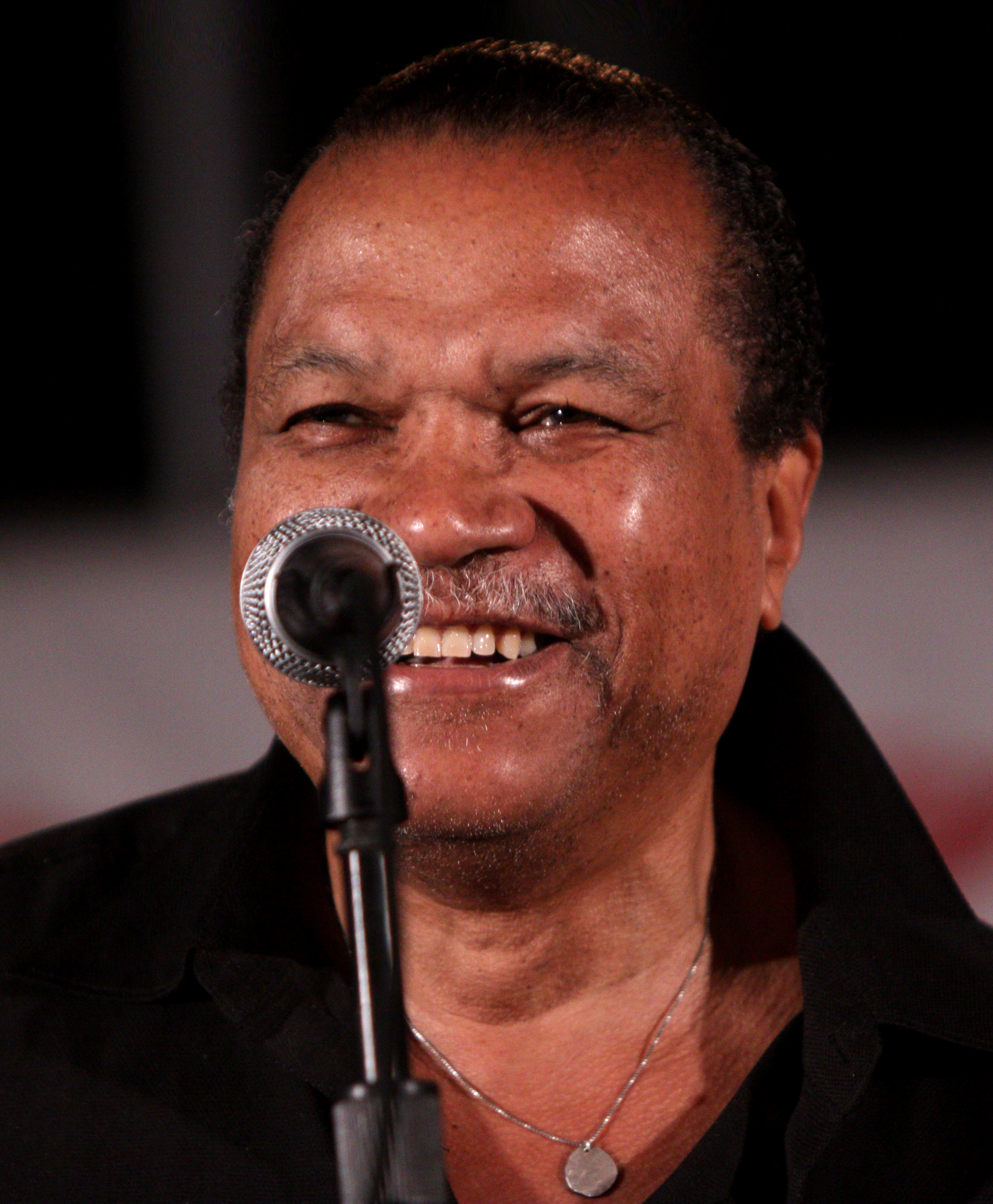
Billy Dee Williams

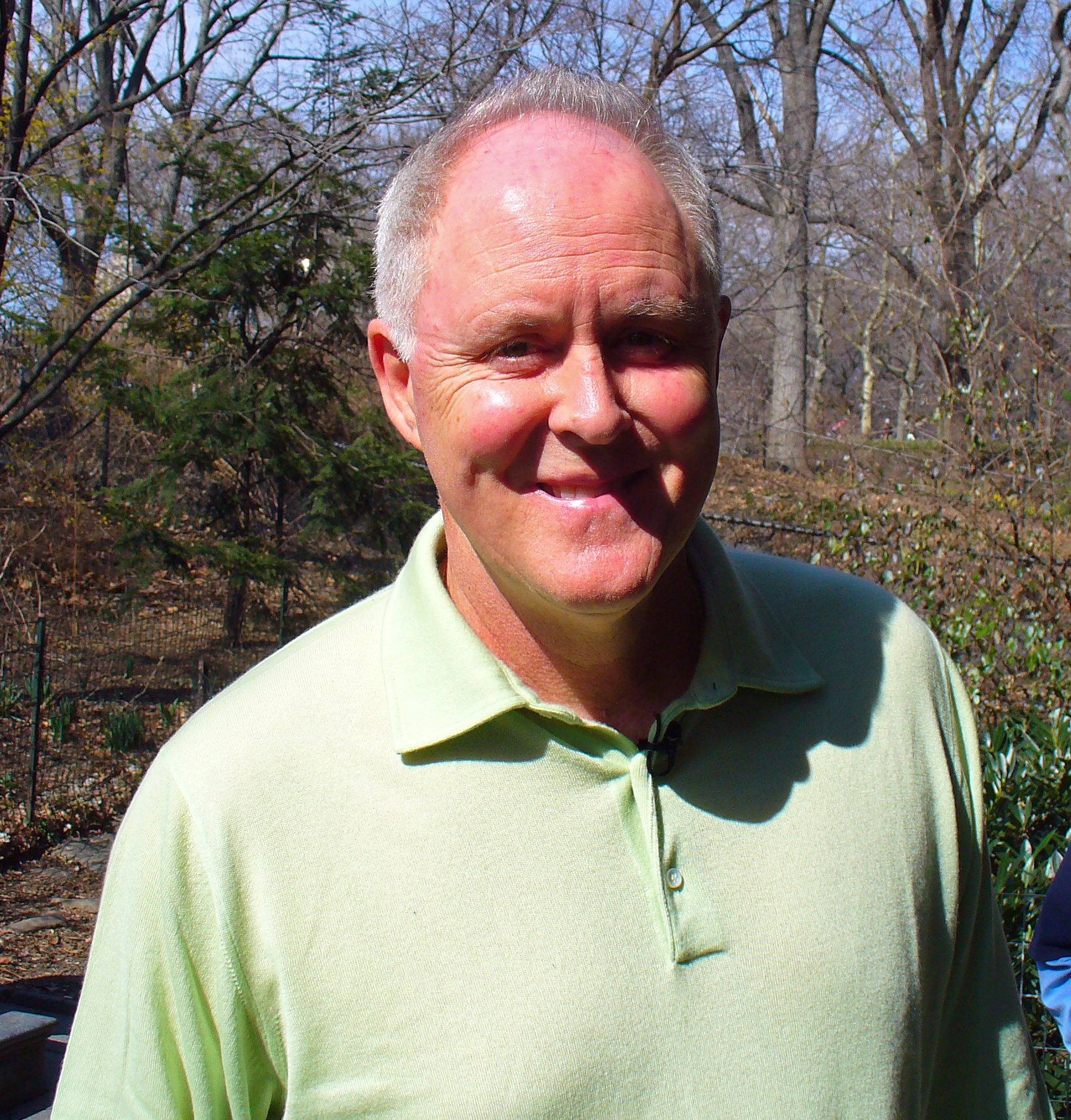
John Lithgow

In the 1980s, radio drama was in decline in the United States. An associate dean of the University of California School of the Performing Arts, Richard Toscan, was keen to champion this art form. Toscan was supported by John Houseman, the producer responsible for Orson Welles's 1938 radio production of The War of the Worlds. He began with the dramatisation of short stories by Raymond Carver on KUSC-FM, a campus radio station affiliated to NPR. Following this production, Toscan collaborated with Houseman and NPR producer Frank Mankiewicz on a project to revive the fortunes of NPR Playhouse, the umbrella title for drama productions on NPR. At the suggestion of one of Toscan's students, Joel Rosenzweig, they developed an idea for adapting the 1977 epic space opera film Star Wars for radio. The popularity of Star Wars would certainly attract new, younger listeners, but they feared that the production costs would be prohibitively high. However, the production team's academic connections proved to be advantageous: USC is the alma mater of the writer and director of Star Wars, George Lucas, and Lucasfilm quickly granted the rights to KUSC, including the rights to the use of original Star Wars music and sound effects, for a token fee of one dollar.

Despite Lucasfilm's generous offer, NPR was still faced with the costs of writing scripts, hiring actors and renting studio space. With no funding available to cover the $200,000 budget, NPR entered into a co-production deal with the British broadcaster, the BBC, which had a long tradition of radio drama production. The BBC provided a production team, including director John Madden, and in exchange received broadcasting rights in the United Kingdom. From the outset, the NPR producers felt that the script would lend itself well to an episodic treatment, drawing on the format of the 1930s movie serials such as Flash Gordon and Buck Rogers that had originally inspired Lucas when he wrote Star Wars.

The American science fiction novelist Brian Daley was brought in to write the script. Daley had access to Lucas's early drafts of the Star Wars scripts, and expanded the narrative to include material which had been cut from the final edit of the film so that the 13-episode radio adaptation ran approximately four hours longer than the film version. Casting the audio serial was not as easy as had been hoped; while the producers were able to secure the actors Mark Hamill and Anthony Daniels from the original film, Harrison Ford was unavailable as he was filming Raiders of the Lost Ark at the time, and his place was taken by Perry King, an actor who once auditioned for the part of Han Solo in the 1977 film.

Led by Mankiewicz, NPR promoted the Star Wars serial with a successful publicity campaign, attracting coverage in Playboy, The New York Times and Time, who hailed the production with the headline, "Radio drama is making a resounding comeback". Star Wars was launched at a special NPR event at the Griffith Observatory in Los Angeles, in which the drama was played under a starry light show. Broadcasts began in March 1981 to critical acclaim, and the drama instantly attracted 750,000 new listeners, representing a 40 percent increase in NPR audiences and a quadrupling of the network's youth audience. On the basis of this success, KUSC went on to produce popular adaptations of the sequel, The Empire Strikes Back. An adaptation of Return of the Jedi followed over a decade later, and it was produced by many of the same people who produced the KUSC/NPR productions.

== Canonicity and continuity ==
The Star Wars radio dramas were authorized adaptations of Lucas's scripts, and they were originally considered canon. Commentators argued that while the radio dramas varied somewhat from the film scripts, they should be considered canon insofar as they did not directly contradict the films. However, in 2012, The Walt Disney Company acquired Lucasfilm and the rights to Star Wars. In 1994, Lucasfilm's continuity editor, Allan Kausch, stated that "'Gospel', or 'canon' as we refer to it, includes the screenplays, the films, the radio dramas and the novelizations." In 2014 Lucasfilm announced that previous works which were set in the Expanded Universe (including comics, novels and videogames) were to be re-branded as Star Wars Legends, and only the Skywalker saga and The Clone Wars film and television series were to be considered canon, in addition to new spin-off works.

The first radio drama relates the backstory which immediately precedes the narrative of the original 1977 film, and this backstory overlaps with the Legends novels Jedi Dawn and Rebel Dawn and the 2016 film Rogue One. Commentators have since noted that the canon story which is introduced in Rogue One conflicts with episode 2 of the radio drama, "Points of Origin". In the radio drama, the Death Star plans are obtained after a Rebel attack on an Imperial convoy; Rebel agents then transmit the Death Star plans from the planet Toprawa to the Tantive IV. In Rogue One, the plans are transmitted from Scarif, where they were archived, to Admiral Raddus' flagship, the Profundity. The plans are then taken on board the docked Tantive IV, which launches before Darth Vader can recapture them.

In 2015 another adaptation of A New Hope was published, The Princess, the Scoundrel, and the Farm Boy. The author, Alexandra Bracken, stated that she was reading the Expanded Universe to try to "sneak elements in" to the canon and adapted material from the radio drama.

== Star Wars ==
Star Wars
- Other names: The New Hope
- Genre: Radio drama
- Running time: 5 hours 56 minutes
- Country of origin: United States
- Language: English
- Home station: NPR/KUSC
- Syndicates: BBC Radio 1
- Starring: Mark Hamill; Anthony Daniels; Ann Sachs; Perry King; Bernard Behrens; Brock Peters
- Written by: Brian Daley
- Directed by: John Madden
- Executive producers: Richard Toscan; Carol Titelman
- Narrated by: Ken Hiller
- Recording studio: Westlake Recording Studios, West Hollywood, CA
- Original release: March 2 – May 25, 1981
- No. of episodes: 13
- Audio format: Stereo
- Opening theme: Star Wars Main Theme

Star Wars is a 13-part (5 hour, 56 minute) radio serial originally broadcast on National Public Radio on March 2, 1981. It was adapted by Brian Daley from the 1977 film, and directed by John Madden, with music by John Williams and sound design for Lucasfilm by Ben Burtt. The serial was recorded in 1981 at Westlake Recording Studios in West Hollywood, California.

Daley adapted the script partly using material from earlier drafts of Lucas's scripts, and restored several scenes cut from the final edit of the film, as well as adding original new scenes created specially for the audio version. The narrative of the first two episodes takes place entirely before the opening scene of the 1977 film, and expands the background to events leading up to the capture of the Tantive IV spacecraft above the planet Tatooine. Episode 1, largely based on cut scenes from the original, explores the life of Luke Skywalker on Tatooine. During the story, Luke's skyhopper (a vehicle seen in the background in Luke's garage during the film) is damaged during a desert race; Luke sees the distant Star Destroyer battle in the sky; and he is reunited with his childhood friend, Biggs Darklighter. Episode 2, made up of material written entirely by Daley, provides backstory to Princess Leia's acquisition of the Death Star plans from agents of the Rebel Alliance on the planet Toprawa. In scenes set on the planet Alderaan, Leia discusses the plans with her father, Prestor Organa, and determines to go in search of Obi-Wan Kenobi. Later episodes mostly follow the storyline of the film, but additional scenes expand the narrative. In one scene, Han Solo has a meeting with an agent of Jabba the Hutt called Heater; this dialogue is based on a scene in which Solo meets a humanoid Jabba in the docking bay, cut from the original film but later reinstated in the 1997 Special Edition in modified form. In another episode, Daley inserts a conversation in which Admiral Motti attempts to convince Grand Moff Tarkin to leverage the Death Star as a political tool.

When the series was re-issued on NPR several years later, it was retitled The New Hope (as opposed to the official alternate title, A New Hope), keeping in line with the subtitles of the episodes of the original trilogy films.

Episode titles:

1. "A Wind to Shake the Stars"
2. "Points of Origin"
3. "Black Knight, White Princess, and Pawns"
4. "While Giants Mark Time"
5. "Jedi that Was, Jedi To Be"
6. "The Millennium Falcon Deal"
7. "The Han Solo Solution"
8. "Death Star's Transit"
9. "Rogues, Rebels and Robots"
10. "The Luke Skywalker Initiative"
11. "The Jedi Nexus"
12. "The Case for Rebellion"
13. "Force and Counter Force"

=== Cast ===
Several actors reprised their roles in the film. Mark Hamill and Anthony Daniels returned to reprise their roles as Luke Skywalker and C-3PO, respectively.

- Mark Hamill as Luke Skywalker
- Ann Sachs as Princess Leia Organa
- Perry King as Han Solo
- Bernard Behrens as Obi-Wan Kenobi
- Brock Peters as Darth Vader
- Anthony Daniels as C-3PO
- Keene Curtis as Grand Moff Tarkin
- John Considine as Lord Tion
- Stephen Elliott as Prestor (Bail Organa)
- David Ackroyd as Tape Voice, Captain Antilles
- Adam Arkin as Fixer
- James Blendick as General Dodonna
- Kale Browne as Biggs Darklighter
- Clyde Burton as Stormtrooper
- David Clennon as Motti
- Anne Gerety as Aunt Beru
- Jerry Hardin as Commander
- John Harkins as Overseer
- Thomas Hill as Uncle Owen
- Ken Hiller as Narrator
- David Paymer as Deak
- Joel Brooks as Heater
- John Dukakis as Rebel
- Stephanie Steele as Camie
- Phillip Kellard as Customer No. 2
- Marc Vahanian as Comlink
- John Welsh as Tarrik
- Kent Williams as Windy

== The Empire Strikes Back ==
The Empire Strikes Back
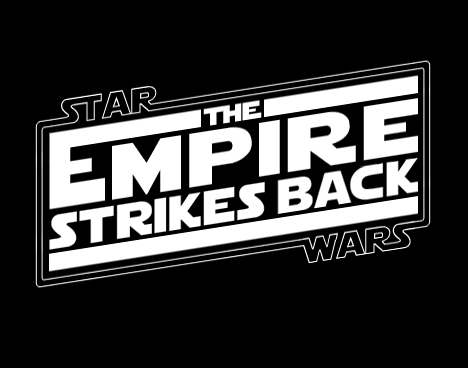
- Genre: Radio drama
- Running time: 4 hours 22 minutes
- Country of origin: USA
- Language: English
- Home station: NPR/KUSC
- Starring: Mark Hamill; Anthony Daniels; Billy Dee Williams; Ann Sachs; Perry King; Bernard Behrens; Brock Peters
- Written by: Brian Daley
- Directed by: John Madden
- Produced by: Tom Voegeli
- Executive producer: Jon Bos
- Narrated by: Ken Hiller
- Recording studio: A&R Studios, New York City
- Original release: February 14 – April 25, 1983
- No. of episodes: 10
- Audio format: Stereo
- Opening theme: Star Wars Main Theme

The success of the first series led to a 10-part (4 hour, 22 minute) series based on the 1980 film The Empire Strikes Back, again written by Daley and directed by Madden. It was recorded in 1982 at A&R Studios, New York City. The series debuted on NPR on February 14, 1983.

Like the preceding series, The Empire Strikes Back expands on the movie's story and incorporates new scenes such an Imperial attack on a Rebel convoy taking place before the film's original opening scene and a tense conversation between Solo and Skywalker when the two are stranded in the Hoth wastelands.

National Public Radio's promoted the series in part by getting Craig Claiborne to create his version of Yoda's rootleaf stew recipe, which the Jedi Master serves Luke in the hut on Dagobah. The recipe ran in magazines and newspapers across the country.

Episode titles:

1. "Freedom's Winter"
2. "The Coming Storm"
3. "A Question of Survival"
4. "Fire and Ice"
5. "The Millennium Falcon Pursuit"
6. "Way of the Jedi"
7. "New Allies, New Enemies"
8. "Dark Lord's Fury"
9. "Gambler's Choice"
10. "The Clash of Lightsabers"

=== Cast ===
Billy Dee Williams reprised Lando Calrissian, and John Lithgow played Yoda at the same time Madden was directing Lithgow in the play Beyond Therapy. Hamill and Daniels returned to voice Luke and C-3PO.

- Mark Hamill as Luke Skywalker
- Perry King as Han Solo
- Ann Sachs as Princess Leia Organa
- Billy Dee Williams as Lando Calrissian
- Bernard Behrens as Obi-Wan Kenobi
- Brock Peters as Darth Vader
- John Lithgow as Yoda
- Anthony Daniels as C-3PO
- James Eckhouse as Beta
- Peter Friedman as Dak
- Ron Frazier as Deck Officer
- Merwin Goldsmith as General Rieekan
- Peter Michael Goetz as Admiral Ozzel
- Gordon Gould as General Veers
- Paul Hecht as The Emperor
- Russell Horton as 2-1B
- James Hurdle as Controller
- Nicholas Kepros as Captain Needa
- David Rasche as Admiral Piett
- Alan Rosenberg as Boba Fett
- Jay O. Sanders as Imperial Pilot
- Don Scardino as Wedge Antilles

The supporting cast again included David Alan Grier and also included Sam McMurray, Steven Markle, Stephen D. Newman, John Pielmeier, Geoffrey Pierson, Gary Tacon, and Jerry Zaks. Ken Hiller provides the narration.

== Return of the Jedi ==
Return of the Jedi
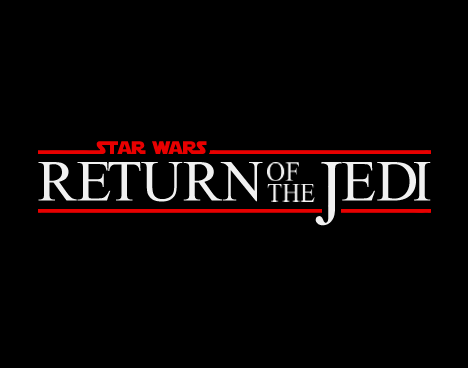
- Genre: Radio drama
- Running time: 3 hours 12 minutes
- Country of origin: USA
- Language: English
- Starring: Joshua Fardon; Perry King; Ann Sachs; Anthony Daniels; Bernard Behrens; Arye Gross; Paul Hecht; John Lithgow; Brock Peters; Ed Asner; Ed Begley Jr
- Written by: Brian Daley
- Directed by: John Madden
- Produced by: Tom Voegeli, Julie Hartley
- Narrated by: Ken Hiller
- No. of episodes: 6
- Audio format: Stereo
- Opening theme: Star Wars Main Theme

NPR's plans for a Return of the Jedi radio serial were put on hold when federal funding for NPR was dramatically reduced; however, NPR was never the producer of the radio series nor was it ever granted the rights to produce the radio adaptations nor did NPR fund any of the radio productions. Plans for a Jedi radio adaptation fell apart in the 1980s due to a disagreement (believed to be financial) between KUSC, Los Angeles (the producer of the two previous radio adaptations and to whom the rights were granted for the production) and Lucasfilm. NPR was granted limited rights to air the two previous radio series because KUSC, Los Angeles provided the radio adaptations to NPR as part of NPR's National Program Service that allows any NPR member station rights to air the series as part of the annual dues already paid (rather than the third party Extended Program Service where KUSC could have charged each station a fee for rights to air cutting out NPR). It was not until 1996 that a six-part adaptation of Return of the Jedi was made by Highbridge Audio, the company that had released the first two series on tape and CD. The production returned to the Westlake Recording Studios, where the original series had been recorded.

Like the preceding series, Return of the Jedi expanded its story by incorporating new scenes. One depicts Luke Skywalker constructing a new lightsaber on Tatooine, based on a deleted scene from the movie. A scripted scene between C-3PO and Boba Fett in Jabba the Hutt's palace was rejected by Anthony Daniels, who felt that the golden droid should not be on friendly terms with a bounty hunter. Fett was replaced by the dancer "Arica" (actually Mara Jade in disguise) from Timothy Zahn's Tales from Jabba's Palace short story.

The audio play's adapter Brian Daley died only hours after its recording was concluded; "additional material" was contributed by John Whitman, who introduced changes that were required so the series could have continuity with the newly developed plan for the prequels, as well as changes that were identified by its director and cast. The series was dedicated to the memory of Brian Daley.

The show's cast recorded a special get well message for Daley after the author left the studio, unaware that he would never hear it. The message is included as part of the collector's edition box set.

Episode titles:

1. "Tatooine Haunts"
2. "Fast Friends"
3. "Prophecies and Destinies"
4. "Pattern and Web"
5. "So Turns a Galaxy, So Turns a Wheel"
6. "Blood of a Jedi"

=== Cast ===
The adaptation used many of the original radio cast, though Joshua Fardon took over as Luke and Arye Gross replaced Billy Dee Williams as Lando. Ed Begley Jr. was the voice of Boba Fett and Edward Asner, speaking only in Huttese, voiced Jabba the Hutt. The only actor who starred in all the feature films as well as all three radio dramas was Anthony Daniels.

- Joshua Fardon as Luke Skywalker
- Perry King as Han Solo
- Ann Sachs as Princess Leia Organa
- Anthony Daniels as C-3PO
- Bernard Behrens as Obi-Wan Kenobi
- Arye Gross as Lando Calrissian
- Edward Asner as Jabba The Hutt
- Paul Hecht as The Emperor
- John Lithgow as Yoda
- Brock Peters as Darth Vader
- Ed Begley Jr. as Boba Fett
- Samantha Bennett as Arica
- David Birney as Anakin Skywalker
- Peter Dennis as Moff Jerjerrod
- David Dukes as Bib Fortuna
- Peter Michael Goetz as General Madine
- Ian Gomez as Salacious Crumb
- Martin Jarvis as Barada
- Jon Matthews as Wedge
- Natalia Nogulich as Mon Mothma
- Mark Adair Rios as Admiral Ackbar
- Yeardley Smith as 9D9
- Tom Virtue as Major Derlin

The supporting cast included Rick Hall, Andrew Hawkes, Sherman Howard, Karl Johnson, John Kapelos, Ron Le Paz, Joe Liss, Paul Mercier, Steven Petrarca, Jonathan Penner, Gil Segel, Nia Vardalos and Ron West. Ken Hiller provides the narration.

== Other broadcasts and releases ==
Existing radio promos, deleted scenes, and additional music tracks are available which originated on previous releases of this collection and in the NPR broadcast versions.

- "Radio Promo No. 1 – Anthony Daniels"
- "Radio Promo No. 2 – Ann Sachs"
- "Radio Promo No. 3 – Mark Hamill"
- "Additional Music"
- "Star Wars Radio Drama – Alternate Take of 'Your Father's Lightsaber'"
- "Star Wars Radio Drama – Alternate Take 'Bail and Leia'"
- "Star Wars Radio Drama – Episode One Cut scene from the Original'" [Luke and Camie]
- "Star Wars Radio Drama – David C. Fein talking about Two Dialogue Scenes Cut"
- "Return of the Jedi Radio Drama – Alternate Take 'Speederbike Chase'"
- "The Making of The Radio Dramas"
- "The Making of Star Wars for Radio: A Fable for the Mind's Eye"

== Spin-off merchandise ==
In 2013 and 2015, two special sets of Topps trading cards were released called Star Wars Illustrated-- the 2013 set featured illustrations of scenes from the first Star Wars radio drama and the 2015 set illustrated the radio version of The Empire Strikes Back. The Topps artwork was also used to illustrate two collectors' editions of the Original Radio Drama released at the same time by HighBridge Audiobooks.

== International broadcasts and releases ==
In July 1981, the Star Wars radio adaptation was broadcast by BBC Radio 1.
