= Harkins =

Harkins is an Irish surname. Notable people with the surname include:

- Brett Harkins (born 1970), ice hockey player
- Gary Harkins (born 1985), Scottish footballer
- George W. Harkins (1810–1890), Native American leader, a chief of the Choctaw tribe during the Indian removals
- James M. Harkins (born 1953), American politician
- Jansen Harkins (born 1997), American ice hockey player
- John Harkins (actor) (1932–1999)
- John Harkins (baseball) (1859–1940), American baseball player
- John Harkins (footballer) (1881–1916), Scottish footballer
- Josh Harkins (born 1974), American politician
- Lida E. Harkins, American politician
- Pat Harkins (born 1963), American politician
- Paul D. Harkins (1904–1984), U.S. General, first commander of Military Assistance Command Vietnam (MACV)
- Teri Harkins, American politician
- Todd Harkins (born 1968), American ice hockey player
- William Draper Harkins (1873–1951), American chemist

== See also ==
- Harkin
- Harkins Transportation Company
- Harkins Theatres a U.S. movie chain
