= Ziviyeh =

Ziviyeh or Zivoyeh or Zivoyyeh (Persian: زيويه) may refer to:

- Ziviyeh, Baneh, Kurdistan Province
- Ziviyeh, Kamyaran, Kurdistan Province
- Ziviyeh, Qorveh, Kurdistan Province
- Ziviyeh, Saqqez, Kurdistan Province
- Ziviyeh District, an administrative subdivision of Saqqez County, Kurdistan Province
- Ziwiyeh, a castle in Iran
