= Hargin =

Hargin is a surname. Notable people with the surname include:

- Janette Hargin (born 1977), Swedish alpine skier
- Mattias Hargin (born 1985), Swedish alpine skier

== See also ==
- Harkin
