= John Harkins =

John Harkins may refer to:

- John Harkins (actor) (1932 – 1999), American actor
- John Harkins (baseball) (1859 – 1940), American baseball player
- John Harkins (footballer) (1881 – 1916), Scottish footballer
- John Harkins (musician), American Australia-based jazz pianist
