= Anne Gerety =

American actress

- Born: July 3, 1926
- Died: October 25, 2003 (aged 77)

Anne Gerety (July 3, 1926 – October 25, 2003) was an American actress who played the voice of Aunt Beru in the Star Wars radio drama.

Gerety was born in New York City, and she was the sister of actor Peter Gerety.

In 1984, she appeared in the Los Angeles Repertory Theatre production of Barry Pritchard's The Day Roosevelt Died, alongside Jack Axelrod.

In addition to her own acting, Gerety and her husband, Tom Hill, formed the Storefront Actor's Theatre, which operated from 1970 to 1990 in Portland, Oregon.

== Filmography ==
=== Film ===
Year	Title	Role	Notes
1979	Quintet	Aeon	
1981	No Place to Hide	Emily	TV movie

=== Television ===
Year	Title	Role
1980	Barnaby Jones	Woman Aid
1981	World War III	Nadia Kortner
1982	St. Elsewhere	Lillian Rogers
1984	Benson	Miss Hotchkiss

=== Radio ===
Year	Title	Role	Notes
1981	Star Wars (radio series)	Aunt Beru	
