= Harkin =

Harkin is an Irish surname, from the Gaelic Ó hEarcáin. It may refer to:

- Allana Harkin, Canadian comedian and playwright
- Bryan Harkin (born 1980), Northern Irish footballer
- Fergal Harkin (born 1976), Irish footballer
- James Bernard Harkin (1875–1955), Canadian commissioner for national parks
- Janet Quin-Harkin, author
- Marian Harkin (born 1953), Irish politician
- Margo Harkin (born 1951), Irish filmmaker
- Michael E. Harkin (born 1958), U.S. anthropologist
- Mikko Härkin (born 1979), Finnish musician
- Mo Harkin (born 1979), footballer
- Ruairí Harkin (born 1989), footballer
- Ruth Harkin (born 1944), U.S. lawyer; wife of Tom Harkin
- Terry Harkin (born 1941), Northern Irish footballer
- Tom Harkin (born 1939), former United States Senator from Iowa
- William Harkin (1831–1881), Canadian doctor and politician

== See also ==
- Harkin Bay, Nunavut, Canada
- Harkin–Engel Protocol—international agreement aimed at ending the worst forms of child labor in cocoa production
- Harkin's General Store
- Harkins
- Oddo–Harkins rule
