= Živica =

Živica may refer to:

- Živica (Požarevac), village in the municipality of Požarevac, Serbia
- Živica (Lučani), village in the municipality of Lučani, Serbia
- Živica, Croatia, ghost town in Croatia
