= ZPO =

ZPO may refer to:

- Pinehouse Lake Airport in Pinehouse Lake, Saskatchewan, Canada (IATA airport code ZPO)
- Zivilprozessordnung (Germany), the German code of civil procedure
- Zivilprozessordnung (Austria), the Austrian code of civil procedure
- Amatlán Zapotec, a Zapotec language
