= Ziveh-ye Qureh =

Ziveh-ye Qureh زيوه قوره
- Village
- Country: Iran
- Province: West Azerbaijan
- County: Piranshahr
- Bakhsh: Central
- Rural District: Mangur-e Gharbi

Population (2006)
  - Total: 225
- Time zone: UTC+3:30 (IRST)
  - Summer (DST): UTC+4:30 (IRDT)

Ziveh-ye Qureh (Persian: زيوه قوره, also Romanized as Zīveh-ye Qūreh) is a village in Mangur-e Gharbi Rural District, in the Central District of Piranshahr County, West Azerbaijan Province, Iran. At the 2006 census, its population was 225, in 29 families.
