= Ziveh, Mahabad =

Ziveh زيوه
- Village
- Location within Iran
- Coordinates: 36°35′52″N 45°35′12″E
- Country: Iran
- Province: West Azerbaijan
- County: Mahabad
- Bakhsh: Khalifan
- Rural District: Mangur-e Sharqi

Population (2006)
  - Total: 139
- Time zone: UTC+3:30 (IRST)
  - Summer (DST): UTC+4:30 (IRDT)

Ziveh (Persian: زيوه, also Romanized as Zīveh) is a village in Mangur-e Sharqi Rural District, Khalifan District, Mahabad County, West Azerbaijan Province, Iran. At the 2006 census, its population was 139, in 38 families.
