= Ziviyeh, Kamyaran =

Ziviyeh زيويه
- Village
- Location within Iran
- Coordinates: 34°56′04″N 46°42′51″E
- Country: Iran
- Province: Kurdistan
- County: Kamyaran
- Bakhsh: Central
- Rural District: Zhavehrud

Population (2006)
  - Total: 197
- Time zone: UTC+3:30 (IRST)
  - Summer (DST): UTC+4:30 (IRDT)

Ziviyeh (Persian: زيويه, also Romanized as Zīvīyeh, Zīvoyeh, and Zīvoyyeh) is a village in Zhavehrud Rural District, in the Central District of Kamyaran County, Kurdistan Province, Iran. At the 2006 census, its population was 197, in 45 families. The village is populated by Kurds.
