= Živinice (disambiguation) =

Živinice is a town and municipality in northeastern Bosnia and Herzegovina.

Živinice may also refer to:

== Bosnia and Herzegovina ==
- Živinice, Derventa, a village in the municipality of Derventa, Republika Srpska
- Živinice, Kneževo, a village in the municipality of Kneževo, Republika Srpska

== Serbia ==
- Živinice, Priboj, а village in the municipality of Priboj, Zlatibor District
