= Harkin Bay =

Bay in Nunavut, Canada

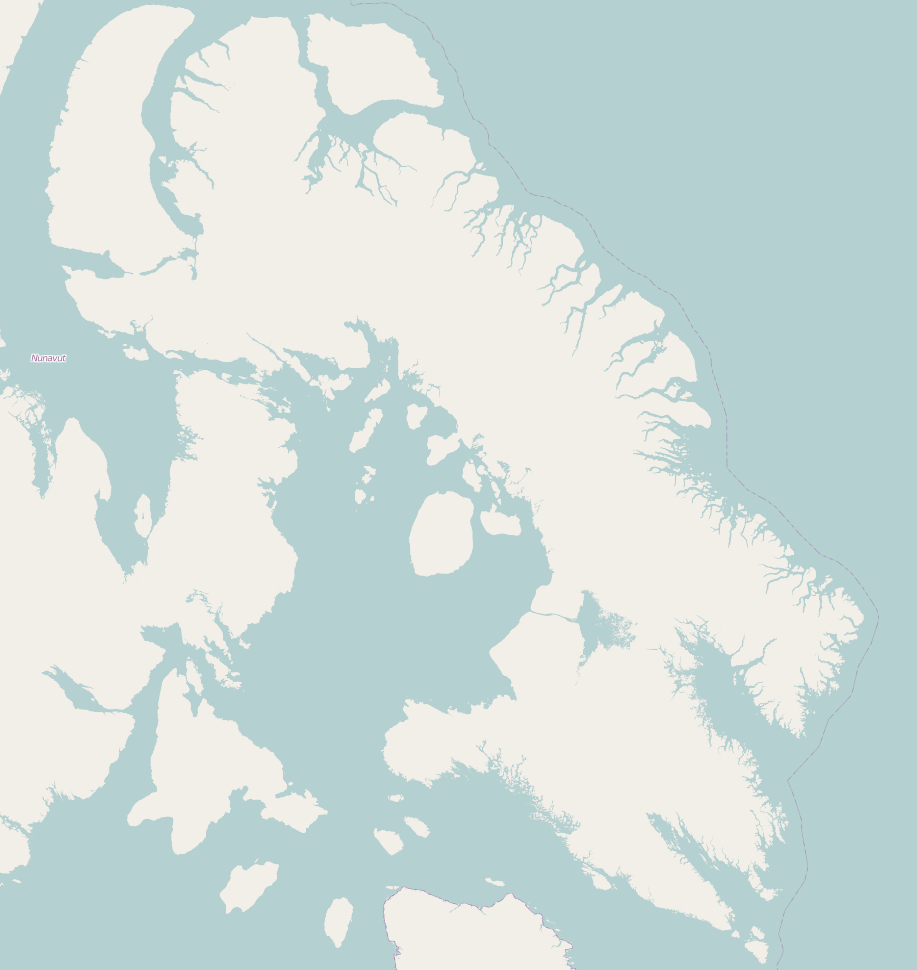
- Location within Baffin Island Location within Nunavut
- Location: Foxe Basin
- Coordinates: 64°50′N 78°07′W
- Ocean/sea sources: Arctic Ocean
- Basin countries: Canada
- Settlements: Uninhabited

Harkin Bay is an arm of the Foxe Basin in the Qikiqtaaluk Region of Nunavut, Canada. It is located on the northeastern Foxe Peninsula, in western Baffin Island. The closest community, Kinngait, is situated 106 km (66 mi) to the south, while Nuwata, a former settlement, is situated 42 km (26 mi) to the west.

== Fauna ==
Polar bears frequent the area.
