= Zivia Kay =

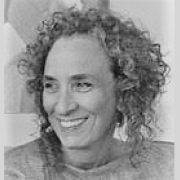
Zivia Kay

Zivia Kay is a textile artist, visual ethics researcher, and senior lecturer at Bezalel Academy of Art and Design. She holds a Ph.D. from the Technion and is known for her culturally-driven textile art. Kay's work combines political philosophy, hacktivism, and fashion theory. Starting as part of her research, Kay is a co-organizer of the International Conference Urban Action.

== Biography ==
Kay is a graduate of the Technion I.I.T. (B.Sc., M.Sc., PhD) and of Bezalel, Academy of Art and Design (B. Des. in Industrial Design Dept.). In her PhD research she coined the theoretical concept of 'The Signature of Appearance' combining political philosophy, hacktivism and fashion theory. Kay is the head of Strategies of Cultural Action at Israel100 initiative and the initiator of the international conferences Urban-Action as Open-Source. She is a member of 'IMAGIN, INSTITUTION', multidisciplinary research group, and a library associate at the Van Leer Jerusalem Institute. She is the Chair of Fashion Expertise steering committee at the Israeli Ministry of Education, Culture, and Sport.

== Art career ==
Zivia Kay is the owner of kUAH studio, focusing on visual activism and civic strategies. Kay also teaches at Bezalel and the Technion, specializing in conceptual design, ethics, and activism. Since 2020, she has been active as a fashion designer.

Kay views design as part of an evolving creative process, which includes a conceptual statement referencing the history of design and art. Her professional intentions to combine practice and theory are assimilated in her teaching as well as in her artworks.... As part of her educational agenda in the Ethical Fashion track, students were challenged to rethink dressing rituals and codes Kay uses simple materials such as plywood and fabric. She challenges fashion trends, "those that are the latest, talked about, with the artist's signature," she writes in the exhibition brochure for 'Rotunda', which showcased her works at the Periscope Gallery. The chairs, shelves, and tables she creates do not have stylistic or aesthetic significance, but they possess simplicity, movement, and conceptual experience, transforming a familiar and worn product into a work of art. Kay's writing is a combination of a call to action and cultural criticism, along with new thinking on visual ethics.

Some of Kay's contemporary works explore ritual and lifecycle themes, including:

- Shrouds for contemporary life cycle – a series of handmade shrouds by Kay, based on traditions that consider burial as an integral part of the life cycle. Elements from the shroud set are used in different religious rituals, and garments from childhood and adulthood are converted into shrouds. .
- Temporary Forever – a series by Kay of changing, unraveling, worn-out pieces, reflecting human aging over time. Living with a piece from the collection means accepting natural changes such as wrinkling and whitening.
- Wushu chairs – modular chairs made from leftover wood, textiles, and leather, incorporating martial arts wushu sticks to explore the art of sitting.

"Netilat Yadayim" (2008), designed in collaboration with Israeli designer Dov Ganchrow, was presented at the 'Reinventing Ritual' exhibition at the Contemporary Jewish Museum in San Francisco in 2010 and the Jewish Museum in New York in 2009. It re-examines the goals and constraints of ritual, focusing on objects, interior structure, and practices from Christian, Jewish, and Muslim traditions.

"Kelipot" (2002) critiques the Israeli desire to convert Eastern folkloric rituals into an allegedly high culture. It was displayed in exhibitions in Israel and abroad, including at the Bezalel School of Art, the Holon Gallery, and the Eretz Israel Museum. It consists of a ceramic serving bowl (12 cm in diameter) designed to hold sunflower seeds and shells.

As a curator Kay worked on "Periscoptiva" an exhibition that documented 15 years of the Periscope Gallery for Design in Tel Aviv. Unlike the book, which chronologically documents the gallery's activities, the exhibition at the Artists' House examines local design developments through the lens of 15 years of Periscope's activities. the exhibition displays approximately 150 works by about 40 active creators, arranged along a path that runs through the spaces at the Artists' House. A path of rocks made of local stone is positioned as a terrace and serves as a display medium. The placement of the rocks in the center of the exhibition spaces directs the audience's attention to view from the edges toward the central activity, with the existing disorder pattern reflecting the nature of the local design space.

== Academic career ==
Kay is a senior lecturer at the Bezalel Academy of Art and Design and a visiting adjunct professor at the Faculty of Architecture and Urban Planning at the Technion IIT. Her expertise focuses on the connection between conceptual design, ethics and activism; she leads conceptual workshops, urban hacktivism and guides students at individual and final projects. In Bezalel she is a member of 'Sustainable Action group' in the Jewelry & Fashion Dept., the Jewelry & Fashion representative at the Center for Career Development, and the Jewelry & Fashion representative at the Sustainable Development Hub.

Kay was the head of the 'Ethical Clothing' Track at the Jewelry & Fashion, 2007–09 and the Head of Urban Action research center, the Hadarion urban lab of the Faculty of Architecture and Town Planning, Technion IIT 2017–22.

== Awards and recognition ==
- 2019 Nicole & Raanan Agus, Best 2019 Innovative contemporary Judaica Research in Bezalel - Tekes | Text | Textile
- 2016 Erasmus+, Visiting Professor Scholarship, National Academy of Art, Sofia, Bulgari
- 2016 FallingWalls Israel, Short list for innovative research - Breaking the Wall of Participation
- 2012-2015 'PAIS', Excellent Visual Culture Research – Action Space
- 2006 Rishon le Zion Municipality, 1st prize – Library design, Kotar-Alon
- 2001-2002 HESCHEL Center, Fellowship – Sustainable Design development
- 2000 Arthur Goldreich Foundation, Mediterranean's Restaurants Exhibition at Ami Steinitz Gallery, TLV
- 2000 Furniture Industries Association, 1st prize – innovative and exceptional furniture design, 'RIHUTIM 2000', TLV
- 1997 Glass Award, Excellency Design, Industrial Design Dpt., Bezalel
- 1997, 1995 America Israel Cultural Foundation, Excellency Scholarship
- 1996 Miesler Prize, Award for Excellent Design in Bezalel

== Solo exhibitions ==
- 2024 Das & Shuf, Loushy Art & Projects, TLV
- 2023 solo artist in Dressed for Eternity: Jewish Shrouds through the Ages, Israel Museum, Jerusalem, curator: Efrat Asaf-Shapira, catalogue.
- 2018 Text | Tekes | Textile, Loushy Art & Projects, Tel Aviv, curator: Meir Loushy, catalogue
- 2007 Green Green Olive, Artists House Tel Aviv, curator: Arie Berkowitz
- 2003 Mandala, Satellite, Exhibition Gardens, Tel Aviv, curator: Maya Dvash, catalogue
- 2002 Rotunda, PERISCOPE Gallery, Tel Aviv, curator: Sari Paran, catalogue
- 2002 Upside down, ASCOLA Gallery, Tel Aviv, Conference, curator: Iris Paz, catalogue
- 2001 Good Morning Israel, Zivia Kay and Shai Barkan, Urian Gallery of Israeli Art & Design, Ramat Hasharon, curator: Giora Urian
- 2000 Mediterranean's Restaurant Zivia Kay & Dov Ganchrow, Ami Stei nitz gallery, Tel Aviv, curator: Ami Steinitz

== Group exhibitions ==
- 2022 Small and Wild, Loushy Art & projects, TLV
- 2020 Rash,Rash,Rash, Contemporary Gragers,Cymbalista Synagogue and Jewish Heritage Center, TLV Univ., TLV, Curators: Dr. Shirat-Miriam Shamir & Dr. Ido Noi
- 2010 Sequences & Identities, Israeli Jewelry Biennale 5, Eretz Israel Museum, Tel Aviv, curator; Sigal Barkai, Catalogue
- 2010 ASA25, Design Exchange, Toronto International Design Centre, Canada, curator: Mel Bayers, Catalogue
- 2010 Reinventing Ritual, Contemporary Jewish Museum, San Francisco, curator: Daniel Balesco, Catalogue
- 2010 From Mediterranean Traditional to Israeli Contemporary Design, Canada's DX in Toronto, curator; Mel Bayers, catalogue
- 2009 Reinventing Ritual, The Jewish Museum, NY, curator: Daniel Balesco, Catalogue
- 2009 Design Exchange, Canada's Premier Design center, Toronto, Canada, curator: Alon Razgur Catalogue; Espace Villeneuve-Bargemon, Marseille, France, Catalogue
- 2008 Amnesia, Zochrot gallery, Tel Aviv, curator: Shlomit Bauman, cat.: Sedek N. 3
- 2007 Lama Kova, Museum of Philistine Culture, Korin Maman Museum, Ashdod, Catalogue
- 2006 Solos: New Design from Israel, Artis - Israeli Contemporary Art In New York, Cooper Hewitt Museum, New York, curator: Ellen Lupton, catalogue
- 2006 Beaten Gold, Israeli Jewelry Biennale 4, Eretz Israel Museum, Tel Aviv, curator: Dganit Stern, Catalogue
- 2006 From Ceramic Design to Product Design, Design Gallery, Holon Institute of Technology, Holon, curator: Shlomit Bauman, Catalogue
- 2006 Re-Orient, Biennale of international Design, St. Etienne, France curator: Eli Rosenberg, Catalogue
- 2004 Cienporcientodise, International Design Center, Buenos Aires, Argentina, curator: Alon Razgur
- 2004 Felissimo Design House, Design 21, New York, Catalogue
- 2004 Rihutim, Swinging Chair, Tel Aviv
- 2003 Combina Complete, PERISCOPE Gallery,Tel Aviv, curator
- 2002 Israeli Design in Abitare Il Tempo, Furniture and lighting exhibition, Verona, Italy, curator: Vanni Pasca & Eli Rosenberg, Catalogue
- 2002 Domestic stuff Exhibition, Frankfurt, Germany, curator: Alon Razgur
- 2002 Stander, Rihutom exhibition, Tel Aviv, curator Ezri Terezi
- 2001 Industrious Designers: Israeli design, Abitare IL. Tempo, Milan, Italy, curator: Vanni Pasca & Eli Rosenberd, Catalogue
- 2001 Sofa, Rihutom exhibition, Tel Aviv Catalogue
- 2001 Drishat Shalom, wondering exhibition, Giv'at Haviva
- 2001 Rihutim, Divider YCATGTM escritoire B-613, Tel Aviv
- 1997 Iyun - 7 designers, Ami Steinetz gallery, Tel Aviv

== Published works ==
1. Kay Zivia, 2017, The Signature of Appearance in the Contemporary Urban Space, PhD thesis under the supervision of Prof. Iris Aravot, the Faculty of architecture and Town Planning, Technion, Haifa, Israel
2. Kay Zivia, 2005, Development and Design of Occupational Therapy Model for the Improvement of Social Skills with Special Needs Population, M.Sc. Thesis, 107 p., Industrial design Dpt. Faculty of architecture and Town Planning, Technion, Haifa, Israel
3. Zivia Kay and Shamay Assif eds, 2021, StreetWise, urban action as open source, Urban and Regional Studies Publication, The Philip & Ethel Klutznick Center of Urban and Regional Studies, Technion IIT, Haifa will be published 2021
4. Zivia Kay, 2018, "Textile Intelligence, A Social Row Material" in Current Trends in Fashion Technology and Textile Engineering, Juniper Publishers, ISSN: 2577-2929
5. Kay Zivia, 2011, "Design Engine", in Periscope Contemporary Israeli Design, ed. Avi Lubin, Hazug Han0zez publication (Hebrew)
6. Kay Zivia, 2010, "The Furniture Conspiracy or the Seated Man Smoothing Wrinkles", in Photocollage, eds. Ben-Blich, B., Horovitz Arieli, D., Ventura, G., Meiri-Dan, N., Bezalel Academy of Art and Design, Jerusalem (Hebrew) ISSN: 2707–3610
7. Kay Zivia, 2001, "Consciousness Design", in Experience Design Paradigms, ICSID-contemporary design, Seoul, Koera (published in refereed conference proceedings #3)
8. Shlomit Bauman, 2008, Amnesia, Zochrot gallery, Sedek Journal N. 3
9. Kay Zivia, "Conceptual workshop", TRIPOD – Material-Text-Image, 12/2019, No.2, Online Bilingual Academic Journal of the Department of Ceramics and Glass Design, Bezalel Academy of Arts and Design: Jerusalem, under review (Hebrew + English)
10. Kay Zivia, Iris Aravot, "From Appearance Space to Action Space", TRIPOD – Material-Text-Image, 3/2018, No.1, Online Bilingual Academic Journal of the Department of Ceramics and Glass Design, Bezalel Academy of Arts and Design: Jerusalem (Hebrew)
11. Kay Zivia, 2015, "The progressive shifting of the self, dressed in Intelligent Textiles", Visual Culture Reader, Tel Aviv, Bar Ilan University (Hebrew)
12. Kay Zivia, 2006, "The Furniture Conspiracy or The Sitting Man is smoothing Wrinkles", The Beauty Shock conference, Proceedings of History & Theory, Bezalel, Jerusalem, 233-239 (Hebrew) (published in professional journal #7 and chapter in book #2)
13. Kay Zivia, 2010, "Design, The direct revolution", Bezalel- Proceedings of History & Theory E-Journal, Modes of Creation Jewelry & Fashion, Issue no. 16, Jerusalem (Hebrew)
14. Kay Zivia, 2015," Action", Transformations, Ceramic and Glass Department, Bezalel
15. Kay Zivia, 2011, "On the Border", 1280°c Journal for Ceramics and materialized Culture, The ceramic artists association, Tel Aviv, Vol. 23 (Hebrew)
16. Kay Zivia, 2010, "Black Mistresses to White Glances, Muscovite Nights in Political Moral View", Ms.Use sex and text, Eco-Sex, Vol. # 2, P.73-77 (Hebrew)
17. Kay Zivia, 2010, "Vase", 1280°c - Journal for Ceramics and materialized Culture, The ceramic artists association, Tel Aviv, Vol. 21 (Hebrew)
18. Kay Zivia, 2007, "Simple Language", 1280°c - Journal for Ceramics and materialized Culture, The ceramic artists association, Tel Aviv, Vol. 15 (Hebrew)
19. Kay Zivia, 2004, "Golem / Gelem", 1280°c - Journal for Ceramics and materialized Culture, The ceramic artists association, Tel Aviv, Vol. 8 (Hebrew)
20. Kay Zivia, 4/2016, "Arction and Fashitecture toward Minoritarian appearance in Public Space", Ar(t)chitecure Conference, The Technion IIT, Faculty of Architecture and Town Planning, Haifa, Israel, proceedings (1/2017)
21. Kay Zivia, 10/2001, "Design to cognition", Exploring Emerging Design Paradigm, ICSID, 10/2001, 190–197

== Articles ==
1. Byers M., 2008, Improvisation – New Design in Israel, Tel Aviv University Publishers, Tel Aviv, ISBN 978-965-7241-28-8
2. Tartakover D., Ofrat G., 2006, Bezalel 100, Vol. #3, Bezalel Academy of art and Design Publications, Jerusalem, Israel, ISBN 978-965-555-363-5
3. Shohat E., 2001, Forbidden Memories towards Multi Cultural Thinking, Kedem Publishing, Israel, 9900220281202
4. Urian G., 2001, From the Israel Museum to Hacarmel market, Urian publishing, Ramat Hasharon, Israel, ISBN 965-90134-9-3, 978-965-90134-9-4
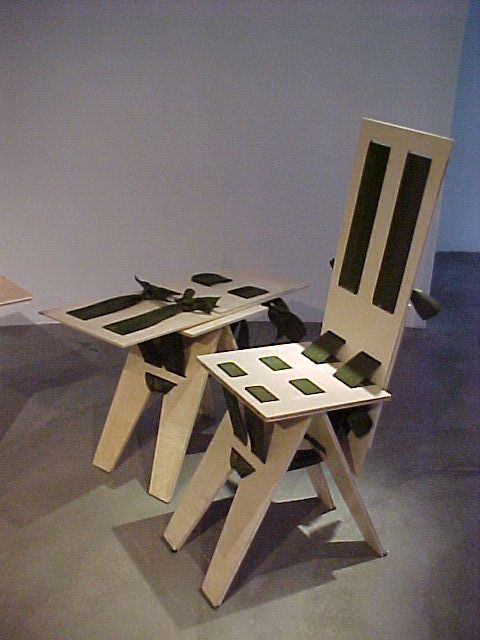
https://www.periscopedesigngallery.com/rotonda

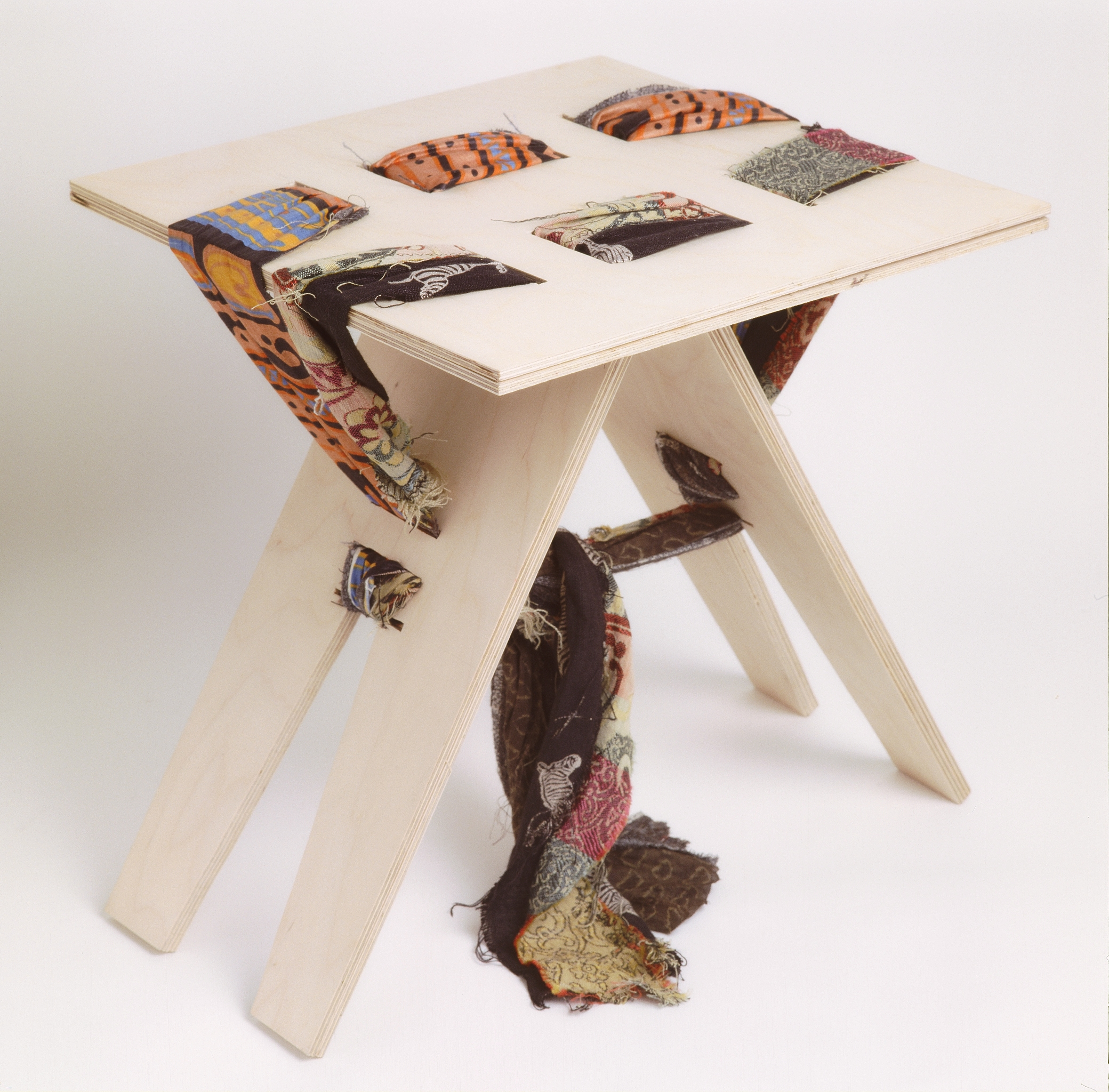
https://www.periscopedesigngallery.com/rotonda

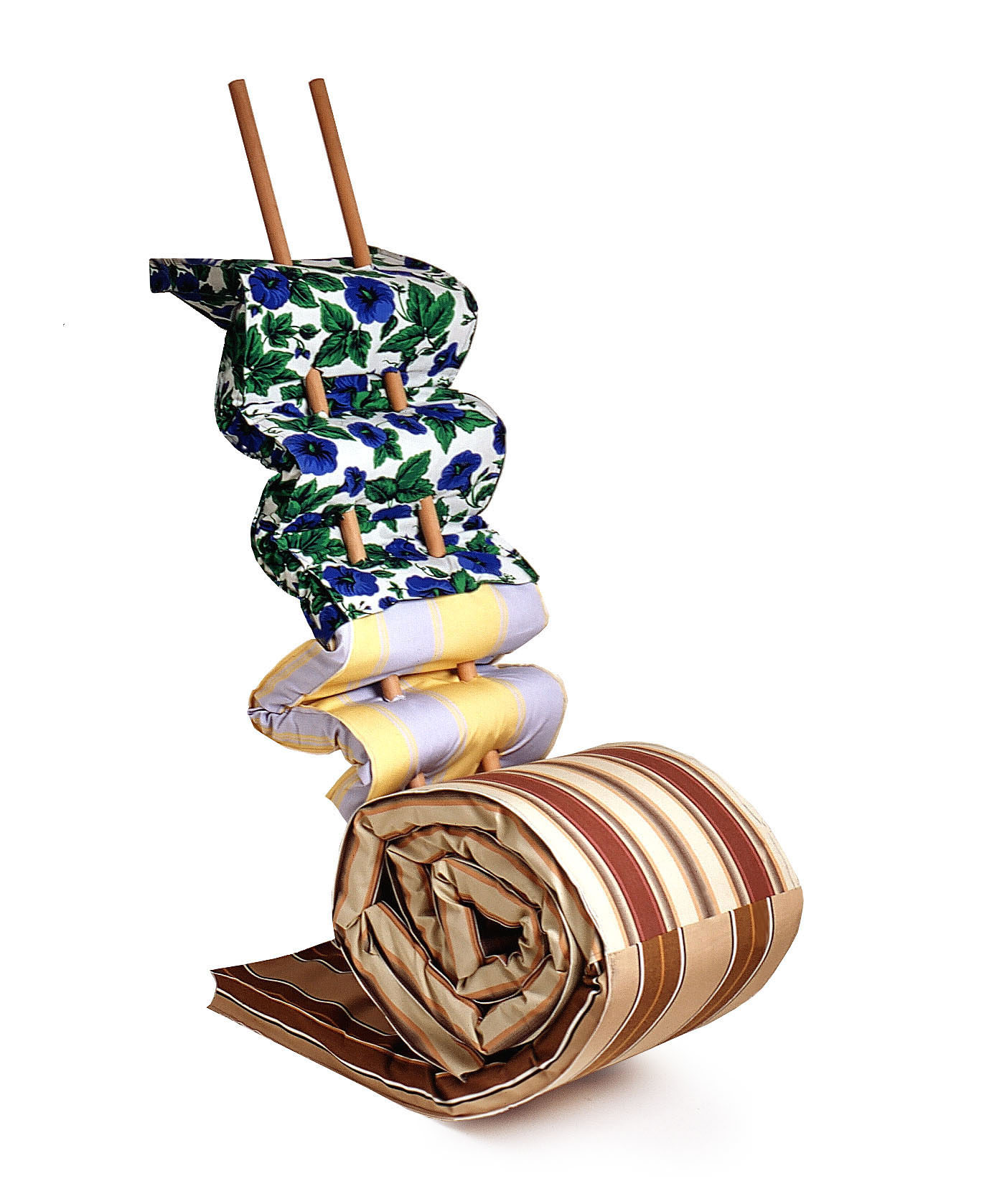
ZitUp-ZitDown series

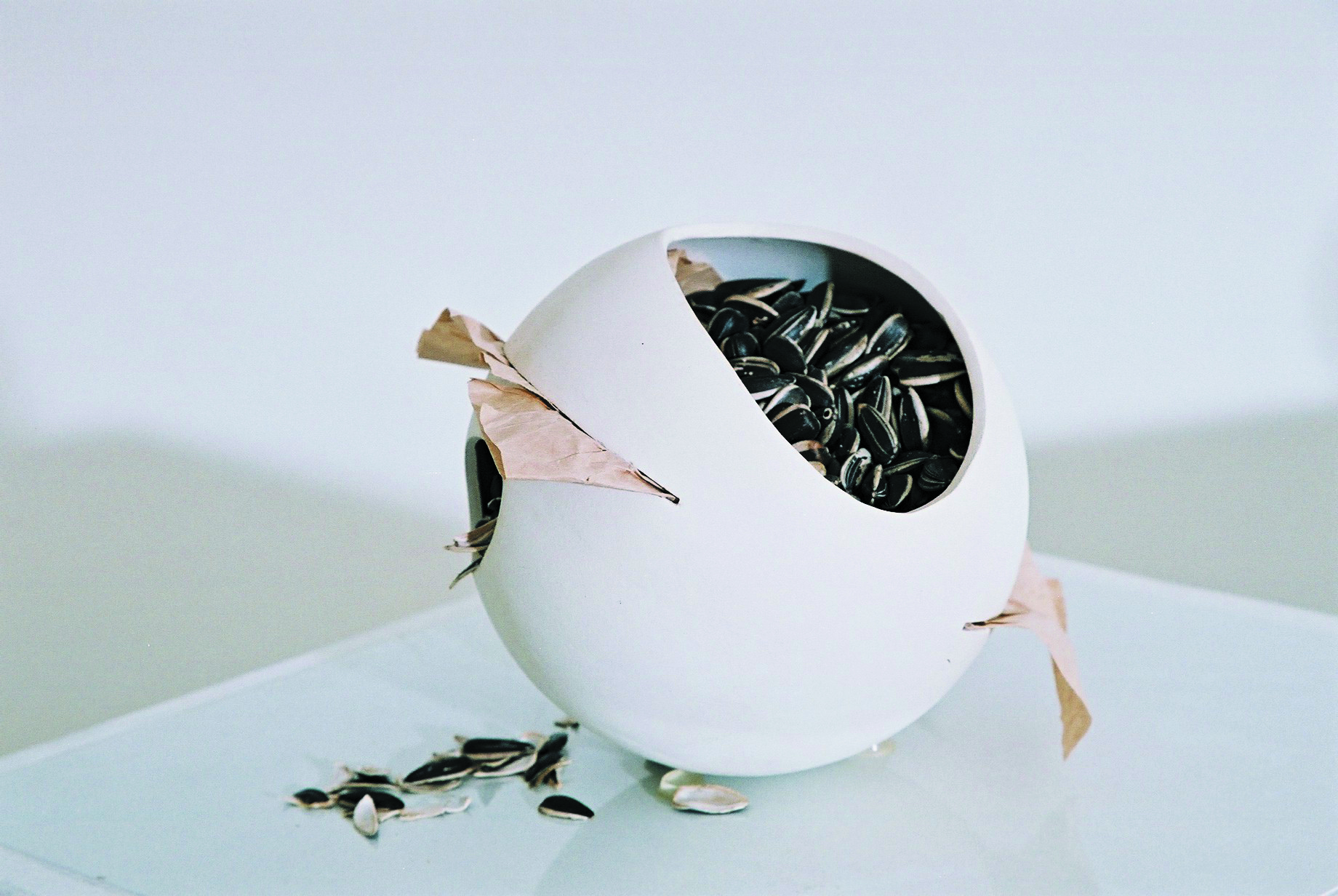

== See also ==
- List of Israeli visual artists
- Visual arts in Israel
