= Ziveh, Kurdistan =

Ziveh زيوه
- Village
- Location within Iran
- Coordinates: 36°13′54″N 47°53′56″E
- Country: Iran
- Province: Kurdistan
- County: Bijar
- Bakhsh: Korani
- Rural District: Gorgin

Population (2006)
  - Total: 174
- Time zone: UTC+3:30 (IRST)
  - Summer (DST): UTC+4:30 (IRDT)

Ziveh (Persian: زيوه, also Romanized as Zīveh) is a village in Gorgin Rural District, Korani District, Bijar County, Kurdistan Province, Iran. At the 2006 census, its population was 174, in 49 families. The village is populated by Azerbaijanis.
