= Živica, Croatia =

Živica
- Village
- Location within Croatia
- Coordinates: 44°33′N 15°13′E
- Country: Croatia
- County: Lika-Senj
- Elevation: 868 m (2,848 ft)

Population (2011)
  - Total: 0
- Time zone: UTC+1 (CET)
  - Summer (DST): UTC+2 (CEST)
- Postal code: 53220
- Area code: +385 051

Živica is an uninhabited settlement in Croatia.
