= Ziviyeh, Saqqez =

Ziviyeh زيويه
- Village
- Location within Iran
- Coordinates: 36°15′44″N 46°41′15″E
- Country: Iran
- Province: Kurdistan
- County: Saqqez
- Bakhsh: Ziviyeh
- Rural District: Gol Tappeh

Population (2006)
  - Total: 304
- Time zone: UTC+3:30 (IRST)
  - Summer (DST): UTC+4:30 (IRDT)

Ziviyeh (Kurdish: Zêwye, Persian: زيويه, also Romanized as Zīvīyeh; also known as Zīveh) is a village in Gol Tappeh Rural District, Ziviyeh District, Saqqez County, Kurdistan Province, Iran. At the 2006 census, its population was 304, in 67 families. The village is populated by Kurds.
