= John Harkins (footballer) =

Scottish footballer

Personal information
- Full name: John Anderson Harkins
- Date of birth: 10 April 1881
- Place of birth: Milton, Scotland
- Date of death: 22 April 1916 (aged 35)
- Place of death: Amarah, Ottoman Iraq
- Position: Wing half

Senior career*
Years	Team	Apps	(Gls)
- Black Watch
1906–1908	Middlesbrough	39	(0)
1908–1909	Broxburn Athletic		
1909–1910	Bathgate		
1910–1912	Leeds City	63	(0)
1912–1914	Darlington		
1914–1915	Coventry City	18	(1)
- * Club domestic league appearances and goals

John Anderson Harkins (10 April 1881 – 22 April 1916) was a Scottish professional footballer who played in the Football League for Leeds City and Middlesbrough.

== Personal life ==
Harkins enlisted in the Black Watch in June 1898 and was bought out of the army by Middlesbrough in September 1906. Soon after Britain's entry into the First World War in August 1914, Harkins re-enlisted in the Black Watch. He was serving as an acting corporal when he was killed in action near Amarah, Iraq on 22 April 1916. He was buried in Amara War Cemetery.

== Career statistics ==
Appearances and goals by club, season and competition
Club	Season	League			FA Cup		Total	
Club	Season	Division	Apps	Goals	Apps	Goals	Apps	Goals
Middlesbrough	1906–07	First Division	30	0	2	0	32	0
Middlesbrough	1907–08	First Division	9	0	0	0	9	0
Middlesbrough	Total		39	0	2	0	41	0
Leeds City	1910–11	Second Division	31	0	1	0	32	0
Leeds City	1911–12	Second Division	32	0	2	0	34	0
Leeds City	Total		63	0	3	0	66	0
Coventry City	1914–15	Southern League Second Division	18	1	0	0	18	1
Career total			120	1	5	0	125	1
