= Ziva =

Ziva, Zivah, or Zhiva, is originally a Hebrew name. Ziva is a first name for women and an equally uncommon last name. The meaning of the name Ziva, which is a variant of Ziv, is “radiance, brilliance, light, brightness, light of God”.

Notable people with this name include:

- Ziva Ben-Porat, an Israeli writer and literary theorist
- Ziva David, a fictional character on the American TV series NCIS
- Ziva Kunda (1955–2004), a Canadian social psychologist
- Ziva Magnolya, an Indonesian singer
- Ziva Rodann, an Israeli actress

== See also ==
- Ziva (crustacean), an extinct genus of crustaceans in the order Palaeocopida
- Ziva (dish), an Israeli pastry
- Živa (disambiguation)
- Ziveh
