= Zivic =

Zivic is a surname. Notable people with the surname include:

- Fritzie Zivic (1913–1984), American boxer
- Jack Zivic (1903–1973), American boxer
- Peter Zivic (1901–1987), American boxer

== See also ==
- Marko Živić Show, Serbian late-night talk show that aired on Fox televizija
