= Zivid =

Norwegian machine vision technology company

Zivid AS
- Type: Private
- Industry: Industrial automation (hardware and software)
- Founded: 2015
- Founders: Henrik Schumann-Olsen, Øystein Skotheim
- Headquarters: Oslo, Norway
- Key people: Thomas Embla Bonnerud (CEO)
- Products: 3D Vision Systems, Vision Sensors, Vision Software, Robot motion-planning software
- Number of employees: 100 (2026)
- Website: www.zivid.com

Zivid is a machine vision and motion planning technology company headquartered in Oslo, Norway. Its products include 3D color cameras, vision software and, since 2026, robot motion-planning software. They are used in autonomous industrial robot cells, collaborative robot (cobot) cells and other industrial automation systems.

The company's primary hardware products are the industrial 3D color cameras for manufacturing and warehouse automation. These include Zivid 3, Zivid 2+, and Zivid 2. They are supported by companion software products: the Zivid Software Development Kit (SDK) and the Zivid Studio, a graphical user interface (GUI).

Zivid 3D cameras are used across a wide range of applications in various industries. These include bin-picking, assembly, and quality inspection in smart automation and production. They are also deployed in high-speed piece picking, parcel sorting, and depalletization in e-commerce and logistics.

The Zivid company, originally named Zivid Labs, was founded in 2015, by Henrik Schumann-Olsen and Øysten Skotheim, former colleagues at SINTEF, Norway's largest independent research organization.

== History ==
=== 2000–2011: Research ===
Henrik Schumann-Olsen and Øystein Skotheim worked together at SINTEF, conducting research into machine and robot vision solutions covering a range of different 3D imaging techniques. In 2010 Microsoft launched the Kinect motion sensor add-on for Xbox, integrating a new form of 3D depth camera.

=== 2011–2014: Prototype ===
Microsoft’s Kinect enabled researchers and tech-enthusiasts to modify an off-the-shelf 3D camera, and at SINTEF the vision team's concept of a ‘Kinect for Industry’ was born. By the end of 2014, a prototype product, named ShapeCrafter 3D, was introduced, showcasing 3D vision capabilities and color point clouds. ShapeCrafter was demonstrated for the first time at VISION 2014 in Stuttgart, Germany.

=== 2015: Foundation ===
The Research Council of Norway provided 6M NOK for further research into 3D industrial machine vision cameras. Henrik Schumann-Olsen and Øystein Skotheim founded Zivid Labs as a spin-out from SINTEF.

=== 2017: Zivid One ===
In March 2017, Zivid Labs introduced its first mass-produced product, the Zivid One 3D color camera. The camera was rated IP65 for industrial use.

=== 2018: Zivid One+ ===
An upgraded version of Zivid One, the Zivid One+ was launched in November 2018 as VISION 2018 in Stuttgart, Germany. The Zivid One+ product portfolio included three 3D color cameras spanning working distances from 30 centimetres (12 in) to 3 metres (9.8 ft). In September 2018, logistics company DHL installed its first fully automated e-fulfilment robot in its Behringe, Netherlands warehouse. The robotic system integrated the Zivid One 3D color camera and was used for de-palletizing, picking, and order-fulfilment operations. The Zivid One 3D camera received Red Dot's "Product Design" award, Vision System Design's "Gold Innovators Award" and inVISION Magazine's "Top Innovation Award". Zivid appointed Thomas Embla Bonnerud as CEO. The company changed its name from Zivid Labs to Zivid.

=== 2019: Enhancement and expansion ===
Zivid introduced a new software development kit and graphical user interface in March 2019. The SDK provided Windows and Linux support, and included a re-engineered API and a second-generation vision engine. The Zivid Studio GUI provided developers with a ready-to-use application for 3D point cloud capture, visualization and exploration. Zivid opened sales offices in China, South Korea, and North America, and appointed first distributors in Canada, China, Japan and USA.

=== 2020: Zivid 2, software evolution and accessories ===
In November 2020, Zivid announced Zivid 2, a faster, high-precision 3D color camera. More compact and lighter in weight than previous products, it was purpose-designed to suit both on-arm and stationary mounted applications.

Major updates to the Zivid software development kit were also announced in June and December 2020. The SDK 2.0 provided: stripe patterns to suppress interreflections, filtering to correct contrast distortion artifacts, enhanced HDR image capture sequencing, and multi-camera calibration.

To simplify camera mounting, Zivid announced a range of accessories in July 2020. For robot arm mounting, a camera mount, bracket, and extender to the ISO 9409-1-50-4-M6 coupling plate standard were introduced along with cable guide, power and data cables. For stationary applications, a reconfigurable pan and tilt camera mount was provided.

=== 2022: Product update ===
In October 2022, Zivid announced Zivid 2 L100, designed to enable robotic picking in deeper, larger bins than are typical of the manufacturing industry. L100 is built on the established Zivid 2 platform, and the original Zivid 2 will become the Zivid 2 M70.

=== 2023: Zivid 2+ ===
In June 2023, Zivid unveiled the Zivid 2+ family, comprising the M60, M130, and L110 3D camera models. This product line unified 5-megapixel 3D and 2D data, resulting in improved point cloud resolution and transparent imaging capabilities. This 3D camera lineup is designed to cover a broad range of use cases with different working distances and volumes that are particularly suited to particular applications.

"Transparency has long been considered an impossible feat in 3D machine vision, and as a leading innovator in 3D vision, Zivid strives to make the impossible possible. Years of R&D efforts are now manifesting themselves in a product that enables consistent and reliable captures from all but the clearest glass."

=== 2024: Zivid 2+ R-series ===
In December 2024, Zivid introduced an upgraded version of the Zivid 2+: the Zivid 2+ R-series. This line of cameras mirrors the original line up for the Zivid 2+ with the MR60, MR130, LR110. The Zivid 2+ R-series brings higher quality 2D data that is sharper, crisper and has less image artifacts while having the same 2D and 3D 5-megapixel resolution as its predecessor. The Zivid 2+ R-series brings a level of robustness and immunity to changes in ambient light to provide more complete, correct and consistent data.

=== 2025: Zivid 3 ===
In November 2025, Zivid announced the availability of the Zivid 3 XL250, designed for depalletizing in warehousing and large bin-picking in manufacturing. It is based on the Zivid 2+ R-Series platform, with improved performance and point cloud coverage quality. It provides point cloud coverage in under 500 milliseconds.

=== 2026: Zivid Motion ===
In March 2026, Zivid introduced Zivid Motion, a deterministic motion-planning software product for robotic manipulation cells, expanding the company's product line beyond 3D vision hardware into robot motion planning.

== 3D Camera Technology ==
To obtain a machine-readable 3-dimensional image of a target object, the Zivid camera technology uses a technique known as structured light, or fringe projection, to arrive at a high-definition point cloud, a highly-accurate set of data points in space. A defined grid pattern is projected onto an object in white LED light, and a 2D color image sensor captures any distortion of the pattern as is strikes the surface. By merging multiple images, complete object depth and surface data are acquired and used to create a full-color 3D point cloud. The Zivid 3D color camera integrates a 1920 pixel x 1200 pixel image sensor to produce a high-quality 5.0 Mpixel point cloud resolution, with XYZ coordinate, native RGB and contrast data for each individual pixel in the point cloud. A good point cloud is characterized by a high density of points and no missing data, yielding a lifelike 3D model of the captured scene.

Zivid 3 3D cameras
Model	Applications	Optimal range	Maximum range	Field of View	Spatial resolution	Point precision
Zivid 3 XL250	Depalletizing, big bin picking, piece picking	1500 mm - 3500 mm	4000 mm	1750 mm x 1750 mm @ 2500 mm	0.62 mm @ 2500 mm	250 μm @ 2500 mm

Zivid 2+ 3D cameras
Model	Applications	Optimal range	Maximum range	Field of view	Spatial resolution	Point precision
Zivid 2+ M60	Assembly, robot guiding, inspection	350 mm - 900 mm	1100 mm	570 mm x 460 mm @ 600 mm	0.24 mm @ 600 mm	80 μm @ 600 mm
Zivid 2+ M130	Piece picking, logistics, bin picking	1000 mm - 1600 mm	2700 mm	790 mm x 650 mm @ 1300 mm	0.32 mm @ 1300 mm	210 μm @ 1300 mm
Zivid 2+ L110	Depalletizing, big bin-picking	800 mm - 1400 mm	1700 mm	1090 mm x 850 mm @ 1100 mm	0.44 mm @ 1100 mm	260 μm @ 1100 mm

Zivid 2+ R-series 3D cameras
Model	Applications	Optimal range	Maximum range	Field of View	Spatial resolution	Point precision
Zivid 2+ MR60	Assembly, robot guiding, inspection	350 mm - 900 mm	1100 mm	570 mm x 460 mm @ 600 mm	0.24 mm @ 600 mm	80 μm @ 600 mm
Zivid 2+ MR130	Piece picking, logistics, bin picking	1000 mm - 1600 mm	2700 mm	790 mm x 650 mm @ 1300 mm	0.32 mm @ 1300 mm	210 μm @ 1300 mm
Zivid 2+ LR110	Depalletizing, big bin-picking	800 mm - 1400 mm	1700 mm	1090 mm x 850 mm @ 1100 mm	0.44 mm @ 1100 mm	240 μm @ 1100 mm

Zivid 2+ 3D cameras
Model	Applications	Optimal range	Maximum range	Field of view	Spatial resolution	Point precision
Zivid 2+ M60	Assembly, robot guiding, inspection	350 mm - 900 mm	1100 mm	570 mm x 460 mm @ 600 mm	0.24 mm @ 600 mm	80 μm @ 600 mm
Zivid 2+ M130	Piece picking, logistics, bin picking	1000 mm - 1600 mm	2700 mm	790 mm x 650 mm @ 1300 mm	0.32 mm @ 1300 mm	210 μm @ 1300 mm
Zivid 2+ L110	Depalletizing, big bin-picking	800 mm - 1400 mm	1700 mm	1090 mm x 850 mm @ 1100 mm	0.44 mm @ 1100 mm	240 μm @ 1100 mm

Zivid 2 3D cameras
Model	Applications	Optimal range	Maximum range	Field of view	Spatial resolution	Point precision
Zivid 2 M70	Tiny to large objects, stationary and on-arm robot mounted	300 mm - 1200 mm	1500 mm	754 mm x 449 mm @ 700 mm	0.39 mm @ 700 mm	55 μm @ 700 mm
Zivid 2 L100	Bin-picking, deeper bins and long grippers, item picking	800 mm - 1400 mm	1600 mm	1147 mm x 680 mm @ 1000 mm	0.56 mm @ 1000 mm	130 μm @ 1000 mm

Zivid One+ 3D cameras
Model	Applications	Optimal range	Maximum range	Field of view	Spatial resolution	Point precision
Zivid One+ Small	Tiny and small objects, trays and boxes	300 mm - 800 mm	1000 mm	164 mm x 132 mm @ 300 mm	0.12 mm @ 300 mm	30 μm @ 300 mm
Zivid One+ Medium	Small to medium-sized objects, totes and bins	600 mm - 1600 mm	2000 mm	433 mm x 271 mm @ 600 mm	0.23 mm @600 mm	60 μm @ 600 mm
Zivid One+ Large	Medium to large sized objects, standard EU/USA pallets	1200 mm – 2600 mm	3000 mm	843 mm x 530 mm @ 1200 mm	0.45 mm @ 1200 mm	300 μm @ 1200 mm

== Application ==
The Zivid 3D color cameras and software are being used as the machine vision sub-system for a variety of autonomous industrial robot cells, collaborative robot cells and other industrial automation systems.

The cameras are applied to tasks including random bin picking, pick-and-place, de-palletizing, assembly, parcel handling and quality inspection in a range of different manufacturing and logistics sectors.

== Corporate Identity ==
The company name Zivid was derived by combining the English word ‘Vivid’, meaning very bright, clear and detailed, with the letter ‘Z’, the depth parameter in a 3D image.

== Accolades ==
- inVISION Magazine: Top Innovation Award
- Vision Systems Design Innovators Award: Gold
- Red Dot: Product Design award
- The Research Council of Norway: Innovation Award, 2018
- Teknisk Ukeblad, NITO, Tekna, Polyteknisk Forening: Tech Award
- Innovasjon Norge: årets Nykommerpris
- Red_Dot_Design_Award: Product Design Award
- Vision Systems Design Innovators Award: Gold (2026), for the Zivid 3 camera family
